= Yuga Furutani =

Japanese racing driver (born 2000)

- Nationality: (Japan) Japanese
- Born: 9 June 2000 (age 26) Hiroshima, Hiroshima Prefecture, Japan

Super GT career
- Debut season: 2023
- Current team: Arnage Racing
- Car number: 50
- Starts: 7
- Wins: 0
- Podiums: 0
- Poles: 0
- Fastest laps: 0
- Best finish: 23rd in 2023

Super Formula Lights career
- Debut season: 2022
- Current team: TOM'S
- Car number: 37
- Starts: 39
- Wins: 0
- Podiums: 8
- Poles: 0
- Fastest laps: 0
- Best finish: 6th

Previous series
- 2022-2025 2020-21 2020: Super Formula Lights; Super Taikyū; Formula Regional Japanese Championship; F4 Japanese Championship

Championship titles
- 2021: Formula Regional Japanese Championship

Yuga Furutani (古谷悠河, Furutani Yūga; born 9 June 2000) is a Japanese racing driver who most recently competed in Super GT for Anest Iwata Racing and in Super Formula Lights for TOM'S. He was the champion of the Formula Regional Japanese Championship in 2021.

== Career ==
=== F4 Japanese & Formula Regional Japanese Championship ===
Furutani started his formula racing career in 2020, where he competed in both F4 Japanese Championship, and Formula Regional Japanese Championship with TOM'S Youth respectively for both series. Even though his debut in F4 Japan did not go well, with five points, and 16th in the standings, his results in Formula Regional Japanese were better, as he racked up runners up in the standings, just losing out to Sena Sakaguchi, who won all but three races. He took no wins, but grabbed 11 podiums throughout the season. In 2021, Furutani continued to compete in Formula Regional Japanese Championship with the same team. He clinched the title ahead of the only other full time driver in the series, apart from the masterclass group, Ai Miura. He managed to win four races and get ten podiums that season.

=== Super Formula Lights & Super GT - GT300 ===
In 2022, Furutani stepped up to Super Formula Lights with TOM'S again, with Kazuto Kotaka, Hibiki Taira, and Seita Nonaka. Furutani achieved a couple of podiums in his debut season, and grabbed sixth in the standings ahead of Togo Suganami. In 2023, Furutani once again stayed in the series with the same team, and also made his debut in the GT3000 class of the Super GT Series with Anest Iwata Racing with Arnage, where he partnered with Igor Fraga & Miki Koyama as the third driver. In Super Formula Lights, even though he managed to clinch three podiums in a row in Autopolis. After that, he did not achieve as much, as he only managed to score a couple of points and eighth in the standings, just barely beating David Vidales, who missed the last round to mechanical failure. Furutani stayed for another year again. Furutani stayed again with TOM'S for his fourth season in the series.

== Personal life ==
Furutani currently attends Waseda University. His father, Hideaki, is the owner and team principal of Hiroshima Toyopet Racing, which Furutani drove for in Super Taikyū between 2020 and 2022.

== Racing record ==
=== Career summary ===
Season	Series	Team	Races	Wins	Poles	F/Laps	Podiums	Points	Position
2020	F4 Japanese Championship	TOM'S Youth	12	0	0	0	0	5	16th
2020	Formula Regional Japanese Championship	TOM'S Youth	14	0	2	4	11	223	**2nd**
2020	Super Taikyū - ST-5	Hiroshima Toyopet Racing	5	0	0	0	0	21‡	10th‡
2021	Formula Regional Japanese Championship	TOM'S Youth	13	4	3	7	10	240	**1st**
2021	Super Taikyū - ST-Z	Hiroshima Toyopet Racing	5	0	0	0	1	35‡	10th‡
2022	Super Formula Lights	TOM'S	18	0	0	0	5	45	6th
2022	Super Taikyū - ST-Z	Hiroshima Toyopet Racing	6	0	0	0	3	78‡	6th‡
2022	Super Taikyū - ST-5	Hiroshima Toyopet Racing	1	0	0	0	0	8.5‡	12th‡
2023	Super Formula Lights	TOM'S	18	0	0	0	3	24	8th
2023	Super GT - GT300	Anest Iwata Racing with Arnage	8	0	0	0	2	34	8th
2024	Super Formula Lights	TOM'S	18	0	0	0	4	34	8th
2024	Super GT - GT300	Anest Iwata Racing with Arnage	4	0	0	0	0	0	NC
2024	Super Taikyu - ST-5	Maple Hiroshima Racing Team	4	0	0	0	2	38‡	6th‡
2024	Ferrari Challenge Japan	Ferrari Japan							
2025	Super Formula Lights	TOM'S	18	0	0	1	5	36	4th
2025	Super Taikyu - ST-5R	Maple Hiroshima Racing Team	5	1	0	0	4	85.5‡	5th‡
2026	Super Taikyu - ST-5R	Maple Hiroshima Racing Team							
2026	TGR GR86/BRZ Cup	Hiroshima Toyopet Racing							

^{*} Season still in progress.
‡ Team standings

=== Complete F4 Japanese Championship results ===
(key) (Races in bold indicate pole position) (Races in italics indicate fastest lap)

Year	Team	1	2	3	4	5	6	7	8	9	10	11	12	DC	Pts
2020	TOM'S Youth	FUJ1; 1; 11	FUJ1; 2 Ret	FUJ1; 3; 16	SUZ; 1; 15	SUZ; 2; 9	SUZ; 3; 14	MOT; 1; 8	MOT; 2; 14	MOT; 3; 11	FUJ2; 1; 21	FUJ2; 2; 17	FUJ2; 3; 26	16th	5

=== Complete Formula Regional Japanese Championship results ===
(key) (Races in bold indicate pole position) (Races in italics indicate fastest lap)

Year	Entrant	1	2	3	4	5	6	7	8	9	10	11	12	13	14	Pos	Points
2020	TOM'S Youth	FUJ1; 1; 4	FUJ1; 2; 5	FUJ1; 3; 4	SUG; 1; 2	SUG; 2; 3	SUG; 3; 3	FUJ2; 1; 3	FUJ2; 2; 2	MOT; 1; 2	MOT; 2; 2	OKA; 1; 2	OKA; 2; 2	**AUT**; **1**; 2	**AUT**; **2**; 2	2nd	223
2021	TOM'S Youth	OKA; 1; 2	OKA; 2; 2	OKA; 3; 2	MOT; 1; 2	**MOT**; **2**; 1	MOT; 3; 2	**FUJ**; **1**; 1	**FUJ**; **2**; 4	FUJ; 3; 2	SUG; 1; 1	SUG; 2; 5	SUZ; 1; 5	SUZ; 2; 1		1st	240

=== Complete Super Formula Lights results ===
(key) (Races in bold indicate pole position) (Races in italics indicate fastest lap)

Year	Entrant	1	2	3	4	5	6	7	8	9	10	11	12	13	14	15	16	17	18	Pos	Points
2022	TOM'S	FUJ; 1; 7	FUJ; 2; 7	FUJ; 3; 9	SUZ; 1; 4	SUZ; 2; 3	SUZ; 3; 3	AUT; 1; 8	AUT; 2; 2	AUT; 3; 7	SUG; 1; 5	SUG; 2; 2	SUG; 3; 4	MOT; 1; 4	MOT; 2; 5	MOT; 3; 3	OKA; 1; 7	OKA; 2; 5	OKA; 3; 6	6th	45
2023	TOM'S	AUT; 1; 3	AUT; 2; 3	AUT; 3; 3	SUG; 1 Ret	SUG; 2; 8	SUG; 3; 7	SUZ; 1; 7	SUZ; 2; 4	SUZ; 3; 8	FUJ; 1; 9	FUJ; 2 Ret	FUJ; 3; 6	OKA; 1; 6	OKA; 2; 6	OKA; 3; 7	MOT; 1; 6	MOT; 2; 8	MOT; 3; 5	8th	24
2024	TOM'S	AUT; 1; 6	AUT; 2; 5	AUT; 3; 4	SUG; 1; 5	SUG; 2; 6	SUG; 3; 6	FUJ; 1; 3	FUJ; 2; 7	FUJ; 3; 4	OKA; 1; 7	OKA; 2; 3	OKA; 3; 9	SUZ; 1; 7	SUZ; 2; 3	SUZ; 3; 6	MOT; 1; 7	MOT; 2; 7	MOT; 3; 3	8th	34
2025	TOM'S	SUZ; 1; 10	SUZ; 2; 4	SUZ; 3; 11	AUT; 1; 4	AUT; 2; 3	OKA; 1; 8	OKA; 2; 8	OKA; 3; 8	SUG; 1; 9	SUG; 2; 3	SUG; 3; 7	SUG; 4; 3	FUJ; 1; 3	FUJ; 2; 6	FUJ; 3; 2	MOT; 1; 6	MOT; 2 Ret	MOT; 3; 6	4th	36

^{*} Season still in progress.

=== Complete Super GT results ===
Year	Team	Car	Class	1	2	3	4	5	6	7	8	DC	Pts
2023	Anest Iwata Racing with Arnage	Lexus RC F GT3	GT300	OKA; 12	FUJ; 14	SUZ; 17	FUJ; 19	SUZ; 10	SUG; 7	AUT; 11	MOT; 17	23rd	5
2024	Anest Iwata Racing with Arnage	Lexus RC F GT3	GT300	OKA; 17	FUJ; 14	SUZ; 14	FUJ; 20	SUG; 18	AUT; Ret	MOT; Ret	SUZ; 21	NC	0
