= Formula Regional Japanese Championship =

Auto racing championship in Japan

- Category: Formula Regional
- Region: Japan
- Inaugural season: 2020
- Constructors: Dome
- Engine suppliers: Autotecnica
- Tyre suppliers: Dunlop (Sumitomo)
- Drivers' champion: (Japan) Ryota Horachi
- Teams' champion: (Japan) Ponos Racing
- Official website: https://frj.jp/

The Formula Regional Japanese Championship is a Japanese formula racing championship held under FIA Formula Regional car regulations. Announced by the Japan Automobile Federation on 26 December 2019, it was confirmed that K2 Planet, promoter of Super Taikyu Series, would organise the championship starting in the 2020 season. After just one year, New Pacific Sports Marketing Inc. took over the series and continues to run it to this day. The top nine finishing drivers in the championship receive FIA Super License points.

== Car ==
The championship utilizes a spec chassis for all competitors, this being the DOME F111/3 chassis. The car will be powered by a single-make 270 hp turbo engine provided by Autotecnica.

Specifications

- Engine: In-line 4-cylinder 1750cc intercooler turbo MAX 270 hp
- Gearbox: 6-speed paddle shift + mechanical LSD
- Weight: 670 kg (minimum weight including driver and ballast)
- Length: 4,900mm
- Width: 1,850mm
- Wheelbase: 2,950mm
- Steering: rack and pinion

== Champions ==
=== Drivers ===
Season	Driver	Team	Poles	Wins	Podiums	Fastest laps	Points	Margin
2020	(Japan) Sena Sakaguchi	(Japan) Sutekina Racing Team	9	11	11	8	275	52
2021	(Japan) Yuga Furutani	(Japan) TOM'S Youth	3	4	10	7	240	61
2022	(Japan) Miki Koyama	(Japan) Super License	5	7	17	8	349	69
2023	(Japan) Sota Ogawa	(Japan) Bionic Jack Racing	11	4	12	5	243.5	24
2024	(Switzerland) Michael Sauter	(Japan) Birth Racing Project	5	6	9	8	209	81
2025	(Japan) Kiyoshi Umegaki	(Japan) TOM'S Formula	5	7	12	5	280	28.5
2026	(Japan) Ryota Horachi	(Japan) Ponos Racing	2	3	12	4	232	6.5

=== Teams ===
Season	Team	Poles	Wins	Podiums	Fastest laps	Points	Margin
2020	(Japan) Sutekina Racing Team	9	11	19	8	275	38
2021	(Japan) TOM'S Youth	3	4	10	7	245	57
2022	(Japan) Super License	5	7	18	8	349	69
2023	(Japan) Sutekina Racing Team	1	8	24	6	309.5	16
2024	(Japan) Birth Racing Project【BRP】	7	6	17	9	254	95
2025	(Japan) TOM'S Formula	13	12	25	12	326.5	99.5
2026	(Japan) Ponos Racing						

=== Masters Cup ===
Season	Driver	Team	Poles	Wins	Podiums	Fastest laps	Points (Masters)	Margin
2020	(Japan) Nobuhiro Imada	(Japan) JMS Racing	0	0	0	0	220	1
2021	(Japan) Takashi Hata	(Japan) Super License	0	0	0	0	196	3
2022	(Japan) Hirobon	(Japan) Rn-sports	0	0	1	0	281	14
2023	(Japan) Yoshitsugu Kondo	(Japan) Rn-sports	0	0	0	0	150	21
2024	(Japan) "Yugo"	(Japan) N-SPEED	0	0	0	0	230	86
2025	(Japan) Yutaka Toriba	(Japan) AiWin	0	0	0	0	270.5	127.5
2026	(Japan) Yutaka Toriba	(Japan) AiWin	0	0	0	0	232	20.5

== Circuits ==
- **Bold** denotes a circuit will be used in the 2026 season.

Number	Circuits	Rounds	Years
1	(Japan) **Fuji Speedway**	11 (Note: Fuji Speedway hosted 2 rounds in 2020 and 2022–2025, and it will host 2 rounds also in 2026.)	2020–present
2	(Japan) **Sportsland Sugo**	6	2020–present
2	(Japan) Okayama International Circuit	6	2020–2025
2	(Japan) **Suzuka Circuit**	6 (Note: Suzuka Circuit hosted 2 rounds in 2025, and it will host 2 rounds also in 2026.)	2021–present
5	(Japan) **Mobility Resort Motegi**	5	2020–2024, 2026
6	(Japan) Autopolis	1	2020

== See also ==
- Super Formula Lights (Japanese regional F2000/F3-class; had been F3 until promoters changed to Euroformula Open format)
- Super Formula (Japanese regional F3000/F2-class)
