= 2018 Macau Grand Prix =

Formula Three motor race

Race details
Date	18 November 2018
Official name	65th Suncity Group Macau Grand Prix – FIA F3 World Cup
Location	Guia Circuit, Macau
Course	Temporary street circuit 6.120 km (3.803 mi)
Distance	Qualifying Race; 10 laps, 61.200 km (38.028 mi); Main Race; 15 laps, 91.800 km (57.042 mi)
Weather	Qualifying Race: Overcast; Main Race: Overcast
- Qualifying Race

Pole
Driver	(United Kingdom) Dan Ticktum	Motopark Academy
Time	2:11.004

Fastest Lap
Driver	(United Kingdom) Dan Ticktum	Motopark Academy
Time	2:10.620 (on lap 9)

Podium
First	(United Kingdom) Dan Ticktum	Motopark Academy
Second	(Sweden) Joel Eriksson	Motopark Academy
Third	(United Kingdom) Callum Ilott	Carlin
- Main Race

Pole
Driver	(United Kingdom) Dan Ticktum	Motopark Academy

Fastest Lap
Driver	(United Kingdom) Dan Ticktum	Motopark Academy
Time	2:10.246 (on lap 13)

Podium
First	(United Kingdom) Dan Ticktum	Motopark Academy
Second	(Sweden) Joel Eriksson	Motopark Academy
Third	(France) Sacha Fenestraz	Carlin

The 2018 Macau Grand Prix (formally the 65th Suncity Group Macau Grand Prix – FIA F3 World Cup) was a motor race for Formula Three cars that was held on the streets of Macau on 18 November 2018. Unlike other races, such as the Pau Grand Prix, the 2018 Macau Grand Prix was not a part of any Formula Three championship, but was open to entries from all Formula Three championships. The race itself was made up of two races: a ten-lap qualifying race that decided the starting grid for the fifteen-lap main race. The 2018 race was the 65th running of the Macau Grand Prix, the 36th for Formula Three cars and the 3rd edition of the FIA F3 World Cup.

The Grand Prix was won by Motopark Academy driver Dan Ticktum from pole position, having won the qualification race the previous afternoon. The race was stopped for more than one hour because of a major accident that saw Sophia Flörsch of Van Amersfoort Racing sustain spinal fractures. She catapulted into the catch fence above a barrier beside the circuit and struck a photographer's bunker after a collision with the rear of Carlin's Jehan Daruvala. Another driver, Sho Tsuboi, two photographers and a track marshal sustained injuries. Ticktum held off his teammate Joel Eriksson after the restart to become the third driver in history to win the Macau Grand Prix back-to-back after Edoardo Mortara in 2009 and 2010 and Felix Rosenqvist in 2014 and 2015. Eriksson finished second and third was another Carlin driver, Sacha Fenestraz.

== Entry list and background ==
The Macau Grand Prix is a Formula Three race considered to be a stepping stone to higher motor racing categories such as Formula One and is Macau's most prestigious international sporting event. The 2018 Macau Grand Prix was the 65th running of the event, the 36th time it was held to Formula Three regulations and the third edition of the FIA F3 World Cup. It took place on the temporary 6.2 km (3.9 mi) 22-turn Guia Circuit in the streets of Macau on 18 November 2018 with three preceding days of practice and qualifying.

In order to compete in Macau, drivers had to compete in a Fédération Internationale de l'Automobile (FIA)-regulated championship meeting during the calendar year, in either the FIA Formula Three European Championship or one of the domestic championships, with drivers placed high up in the rankings of these respective championships given priority in receiving an invitation to the meeting. Within the 28-car grid for the event, two 2018 Formula Three champions competed: Mick Schumacher, the Formula Three European champion, was joined in Macau by Sho Tsuboi, the Japanese series winner. Other drivers entered included F3 Asian Championship runner-up Jake Hughes, ADAC Formula 4 Championship driver Frederik Vesti, GP3 Series racer Callum Ilott, Super Formula Championship competitor Yuhi Sekiguchi, one-time Deutsche Tourenwagen Masters race winner Joel Eriksson, and Sophia Flörsch, the first woman to participate in the race since Tatiana Calderón in the 2014 event.

== Practice and qualifying ==
There were two 40-minute practice sessions preceding the Sunday race: one on Thursday mid-morning and one on late Friday morning. Lap times in the first practice session were two seconds slower than in the 2017 race because of a clean circuit. Schumacher slipstreamed Ilott to set the session's fastest lap of 2 minutes, 12.168 seconds with two minutes left. Ilott was three-hundredths of a second slower in second. Jüri Vips, Dan Ticktum, Eriksson, Sacha Fenestraz, Robert Shwartzman, Álex Palou, Tsuboi and Hughes were in positions three to ten. While the session passed relatively peacefully, traffic delayed some drivers, and Vips damaged the left-rear rim and tyre in an impact with the barrier at Police corner, sustaining a puncture that was replaced in the pit lane.

If you've got a fast driver in front of you it does help. Our track position was good, and where we are in the pits [over halfway down the field] I'm not in a position to get a slipstream from who I want to. Every lap I did was without a tow.

— Callum Ilott, who provisionally qualified in second, and remained in the position for the qualifying race.

Qualifying was split into two sessions; the first was held on Thursday afternoon and ran for 40 minutes with the second identically timed session held on Friday afternoon. The fastest time set by each driver from either session counted towards that competitor's final starting position for the qualification race. The first qualifying session was red flagged after 14 minutes because local driver Hon Chio Leong crashed into a barrier exiting Police turn and blocked the track with his car sideways. Shortly after qualifying restarted, Ticktum and Ilott exchanged the provisional pole position until Ticktum on a new set of tyres emerged on top with a lap of 2 minutes, 11.004 seconds with Ilott providing him with a minor slipstream advantage. With five minutes to go, a second stoppage was necessitated when Enaam Ahmed made contact with the Police corner barrier in a near identical crash to Leong. As competitors attempted to improve their lap times, they were denied the opportunity as Sena Sakaguchi drifted wide and crashed heavily at the Reservoir Bend turn, destroying his car's left-hand quarter as he ended up against the start/finish straight wall. Qualifying concluded early because of a lack of time for drivers to improve. Ilott was second and Schumacher moved to third before the second red flag was waved. Fourth-placed Hughes had similarly improved before the second stoppage. Sekiguchi finished fifth to make it five teams in the first five positions. Fenestraz was sixth after a minor head-on crash against Police turn's barrier and had his front wing replaced in the pit lane. Eriksson and his Motopark Academy teammate Vips delayed leaving the pit lane; traffic blocked them and were seventh and eleventh. They were separated by Palou, Ferdinand Habsburg and Tsuboi. The rest of the provisional grid was Ahmed, Marcus Armstrong, Guanyu Zhou, Flörsch, Jehan Daruvala, Ritomo Miyata, Ralf Aron, Shwartzman, Marino Sato, Kevyan Andres, Vesti, Toshiki Oyu, Sakaguchi, Leong, Ukyo Sasahara, Yoshiaki Katayama and Ryuji "Dragon" Kumita.

It was expected that the battle between Ticktum, Ilott and Schumacher would continue into Friday's scheduled sessions. In the second 40-minute practice session, Eriksson led the first 20 minutes until Vips bettered his lap with nine minutes to go and then Ilott improved it four minutes later. Schumacher then further improved on Ilott's effort with a best time of the weekend at the point of 2 minutes, 10.674 seconds, before a red flag period was prompted for Oyu's crash at Maternity Bend corner, which ended all competitive running with two minutes remaining. Ilott was 0.091 seconds slower in second. Vips, Hughes, Ticktum, Eriksson. Armstrong, Palou, Aron and Daruvala completed the top ten. Oyu also caused yellow flags to wave after he ran deep onto Lisboa corner's escape road and Ahmed (twice) and Fenestraz did the same; all three participants avoided contact with a barrier beside the track.

"It was turning into the same as last year [with all the incidents], but I tried to get the lap after the FCY. The [2m]10.1s [lap] was almost perfect, and the next one I managed to iron out a couple of mistakes. This year the track seems to be considerably better. We don't seem to use the tyres so much – you get a couple more laps than before, so you can do three or four quick ones.

— Dan Ticktum, on setting the fastest ever lap of the Guia Circuit to qualify on pole position for the qualification race.

In the second qualifying session, Schumacher locked his tyres and ran onto Lisboa turn's escape road in the tenth minute, brushing a trackside barrier with his left-rear wheel. He then avoided a crash at Dona Maria Bend after his left-rear tyre punctured and entered the run-off area. Not long after, Andres and Katayama made contact in Lisboa turn's braking zone and both drivers hit a wall. At the same time, Tsuboi crashed at the Solitude Esses and the red flags were waved for two minutes. After the session was restarted, Armstrong made contact a Melco hairpin wall with his car's front. Ticktum could not improve his lap in qualifying's opening minutes, as Ilott led on his first timed lap, just after a full course yellow flag was prompted for Ahmed's spin and crash into the Reservoir Bend corner wall. Ticktum then improved twice in the final minutes, and set the first lap time under 2 minutes, 10 seconds at the Guia Circuit, at 2 minutes, 9.910 seconds, which bettered Marcus Ericsson's 2009 lap record and earned Ticktum pole position for the qualifying race. At the session's end, Sato crashed at Police bend, and Ilott narrowly avoided hitting him on the inside, stopping Ilott from improving his lap. Then, Sasahara hit the Reservoir Bend barrier, ricocheted across the circuit, and collected Eriksson. Vips avoided the accident scene but it ended the session early. Ticktum was joined on the grid's front row by Ilott and Fenestraz moved from sixth to third after slipstreaming Ticktum. Fourth was Eriksson and Zhou progressed to fifth. Hughes fell to sixth while Sato moved to seventh. Armstrong led a trio of Prema cars in eighth, Schumacher ninth and Aron tenth. Behind them the rest of the grid lined up as Sekiguchi, Shwartzman, Palou, Vips, Habsburg, Tsuboi, Ahmed, Vesti, Daruvala, Flörsch, Miyata, Leong, Sakaguchi, Andres, Oyu, Katayama and Kumita.

=== Qualifying classification ===
Final qualifying classification
Pos	No.	Driver	Team	Q1 Time	Rank	Q2 Time	Rank	Gap	Grid
1	1	Dan Ticktum (GBR)	Motopark Academy	2:11.004	1	2:09.910	1	—	1
2	18	Callum Ilott (GBR)	Carlin	2:11.136	2	2:10.353	2	+0.443	2
3	19	Sacha Fenestraz (FRA)	Carlin	2:11.707	6	2:10.580	3	+0.670	3
4	2	Joel Eriksson (SWE)	Motopark Academy	2:11.732	7	2:10.991	4	+1.081	4
5	8	Guanyu Zhou (CHN)	SJM Theodore Racing by Prema	2:12.078	14	2:11.130	5	+1.220	5
6	30	Jake Hughes (GBR)	Hitech GP	2:11.498	4	2:11.155	6	+1.245	6
7	6	Marino Sato (JPN)	Motopark Academy	2:13.392	20	2:11.262	7	+1.352	7
8	11	Marcus Armstrong (ITA)	SJM Theodore Racing by Prema	2:12.039	13	2:11.329	8	+1.419	8
9	9	Mick Schumacher (DEU)	SJM Theodore Racing by Prema	2:11.433	3	2:11.382	9	+1.472	9
10	10	Ralf Aron (EST)	SJM Theodore Racing by Prema	2:12.704	18	2:11.446	10	+1.536	10
11	15	Yuhi Sekiguchi (JPN)	B-Max Racing Team	2:11.674	5	2:12.280	15	+1.664	11
12	12	Robert Shwartzman (RUS)	SJM Theodore Racing by Prema	2:13.068	19	2:11.746	11	+1.736	12
13	16	Álex Palou (ESP)	B-Max Racing Team	2:11.775	8	2:12.498	17	+1.765	13
14	3	Jüri Vips (EST)	Motopark Academy	2:11.980	11	2:11.855	12	+1.835	14
15	5	Ferdinand Habsburg (AUT)	Motopark Academy	2:11.917	9	2:12.027	13	+2.007	15
16	31	Sho Tsuboi (JPN)	Team TOM'S	2:11.966	10	2:13.137	22	+2.056	16
17	29	Enaam Ahmed (GBR)	Hitech GP	2:11.998	12	2:12.661	18	+2.086	17
18	26	Frederik Vesti (DNK)	Van Amersfoort Racing	2:14.014	22	2:12.104	15	+2.194	18
19	17	Jehan Daruvala (IND)	Carlin	2:12.598	16	2:12.189	16	+2.279	19
20	25	Sophia Flörsch (DEU)	Van Amersfoort Racing	2:12.517	15	2:13.641	24	+2.607	20
21	32	Ritomo Miyata (JPN)	Team TOM'S	2:12.646	17	2:12.680	19	+2.736	21
22	28	Hon Chio Leong (MAC)	Hitech GP	2:14.970	25	2:12.943	20	+3.033	22
23	21	Sena Sakaguchi (JPN)	Toda Racing	2:14.668	24	2:13.041	21	+3.131	23
24	27	Ukyo Sasahara (JPN)	ThreeBond Racing	2:16.571	26	2:13.514	23	+3.604	24
25	23	Keyvan Andres (IRN)	Van Amersfoort Racing	2:13.554	21	2:14.659	25	+3.644	25
26	22	Toshiki Oyu (JPN)	Toda Racing	2:14.067	23	2:15.026	26	+4.157	26
27	20	Yoshiaki Katayama (JPN)	Carlin	2:19.521	27	2:15.681	27	+5.771	27
110% qualifying time: 2:22.901
28	33	Ryuji Kumita (JPN)	B-Max Racing Team	2:24.135	28	2:21.771	28	+12.861	28
Bold time indicates the faster of the two times that determined the grid order.

== Qualification race ==
The qualifying race to set the grid order for the main race commenced at 13:05 Macau Standard Time (UTC+08:00) on 17 November. Weather conditions at the start were dry and overcast with the air temperature at 23 °C (73 °F). Ilott tucked into the slipstream of Ticktum and steered to the outside of the Mandarin Oriental bend corner and made a pass for the lead. Ilott maintained it through Lisboa turn despite an oversteer that had him narrowly avoid glancing a trackside wall with his left-rear tyre against as he used Ticktum as a braking point reference. Eriksson passed Fenestraz for third into Lisboa corner. Other cars slowed Eriksson, and Fenestraz retook the position at San Francisco Bend turn. That lap, Sakaguchi crashed into a barrier at San Francisco Bend turn and retired. Ticktum remained close behind Ilott and he retook the lead by going to the outside of Lisboa corner. He began to pull away from the rest of the field and led Ilott by 1.341 seconds by the second lap's conclusion. Shortly after, Katayama made contact with a wall and became the second retirement. On lap three, in the track's mountain section at Dona Maria Bend, a stray dog got onto the circuit, and Ticktum swerved off the racing line to avoid hitting it. A full course yellow flag was implemented and then the safety car was deployed for dog retrieval by track marshals.

It was clear even in the first half a lap that our pace was stronger than Callum's. So I really tried to nail the final sector and I got him back for the lead. While Callum was behind I saw I was pulling away quite easily, and I was saving tyres for the last part of the race. As soon as I saw Joel behind... I've seen he's been in a quicker car overall this weekend but didn't get the chance to show it in qualifying, so I upped the ante quite a bit. That was enough to pull a gap and I backed off on the last lap.

— Dan Ticktum, speaking about his worry about the challenge his teammate Joel Eriksson would provide.

At the lap five restart, Ticktum made a fast getaway to maintain the lead heading into the Mandarin Oriental Bend corner, as his teammate Eriksson overtook Fenestraz on the inside at the same turn. On the sixth lap, Eriksson went to the inside of Ilott and passed him on the approach to Lisboa turn to move into second despite minor contact against a trackside wall. Miyata joined the retirements list after a collision with a wall at Lisboa corner on lap seven. On that lap, Vesti also retired when he collided with a barrier at the same turn. In the meantime, Eriksson was 1.675 seconds behind his teammate Ticktum at the conclusion of lap six. Fenestraz attempted an unsuccessful overtake on his teammate Ilott at Lisboa turn three laps later. Ticktum increased his lead to 2.247 seconds by the start of the final lap and he subsequently slowed slightly to win the qualification race and begin the main event from pole position. Eriksson followed 1.563 seconds later in second and Ilott completed the podium in third place. Fenestraz took fourth. A large gap to fifth place was created when Zhou crashed at the Solitude Esses and Hughes took the position and held it until the finish. Schumacher and Vips were sixth and seventh. Eighth-placed Armstrong led a trio of Premas with Aron ninth and Shwartman tenth. Outside the top ten, Sato fell four from his starting place to eleventh. The final classified finishers were Palou, Habsburg, Sekiguchi, Ahmed, Tsuboi, Daruvala, Leong, Flörsch, Andres, Oyu, Sasahara, Kumita and Zhou.

=== Qualification race classification ===
Final qualification race classification
Pos	No.	Driver	Team	Laps	Time/Retired	Grid
1	1	Dan Ticktum (GBR)	Motopark Academy	10	23:41.034	1
2	2	Joel Eriksson (SWE)	Motopark Academy	10	+1.563	4
3	18	Callum Ilott (GBR)	Carlin	10	+3.165	2
4	19	Sacha Fenestraz (FRA)	Carlin	10	+3.948	3
5	30	Jake Hughes (GBR)	Hitech GP	10	+11.098	6
6	9	Mick Schumacher (DEU)	SJM Theodore Racing by Prema	10	+11.878	9
7	3	Jüri Vips (EST)	Motopark Academy	10	+12.518	14
8	11	Marcus Armstrong (ITA)	SJM Theodore Racing by Prema	10	+13.713	8
9	10	Ralf Aron (EST)	SJM Theodore Racing by Prema	10	+14.199	10
10	12	Robert Shwartzman (RUS)	SJM Theodore Racing by Prema	10	+16.535	12
11	6	Marino Sato (JPN)	Motopark Academy	10	+18.374	7
12	16	Álex Palou (ESP)	B-Max Racing Team	10	+19.602	13
13	5	Ferdinand Habsburg (AUT)	Motopark Academy	10	+20.235	15
14	15	Yuhi Sekiguchi (JPN)	B-Max Racing Team	10	+21.445	11
15	29	Enaam Ahmed (GBR)	Hitech GP	10	+22.161	17
16	31	Sho Tsuboi (JPN)	Team TOM'S	10	+24.244	16
17	17	Jehan Daruvala (IND)	Carlin	10	+24.763	19
18	28	Hon Chio Leong (MAC)	Hitech GP	10	+27.513	22
19	25	Sophia Flörsch (DEU)	Van Amersfoort Racing	10	+29.159	20
20	23	Keyvan Andres (IRN)	Van Amersfoort Racing	10	+30.851	25
21	22	Toshiki Oyu (JPN)	Toda Racing	10	+32.442	26
22	27	Ukyo Sasahara (JPN)	ThreeBond Racing	10	+33.995	24
23	33	"Dragon" (JPN)	B-Max Racing Team	10	+1:58.193	28
24	8	Guanyu Zhou (CHN)	SJM Theodore Racing by Prema	9	Accident	5
Ret	26	Frederik Vesti (DNK)	Van Amersfoort Racing	6	Accident	18
Ret	32	Ritomo Miyata (JPN)	Team TOM'S	6	Accident	21
Ret	20	Yoshiaki Katayama (JPN)	Carlin	2	Accident	27
Ret	21	Sena Sakaguchi (JPN)	Toda Racing	0	Accident	23
Fastest lap: Dan Ticktum, 2:10.620, 168.6 km/h (104.8 mph) on lap 6

== Main race ==
The race began at 15:30 local time. Weather conditions at the start were dry and overcast with the air temperature at 24 °C (75 °F). Ticktum maintained his pole position advantage on the run into Mandarin Oriental Bend corner. Fenestraz used his car's four new tyres to overtake his teammate Ilott and Eriksson to advance from fourth to second place on the first lap. Ilott fell to fifth because he was on a different line into Lisboa turn. The safety car was dispatched on the same lap as Sato crashed at the exit to Lisboa corner and Palou went off at the turn's entry. Behind Palou, Leong and Andres were caught up in the chain-reaction accident and all four drivers retired due to car damage. Ticktum held the lead at the restart from Fenestraz in second place on the fourth lap. Eriksson was close behind Fenestraz; he decided against an overtake into Lisboa corner because he saw erroneously illuminated LED yellow flag lights on both sides of the track.

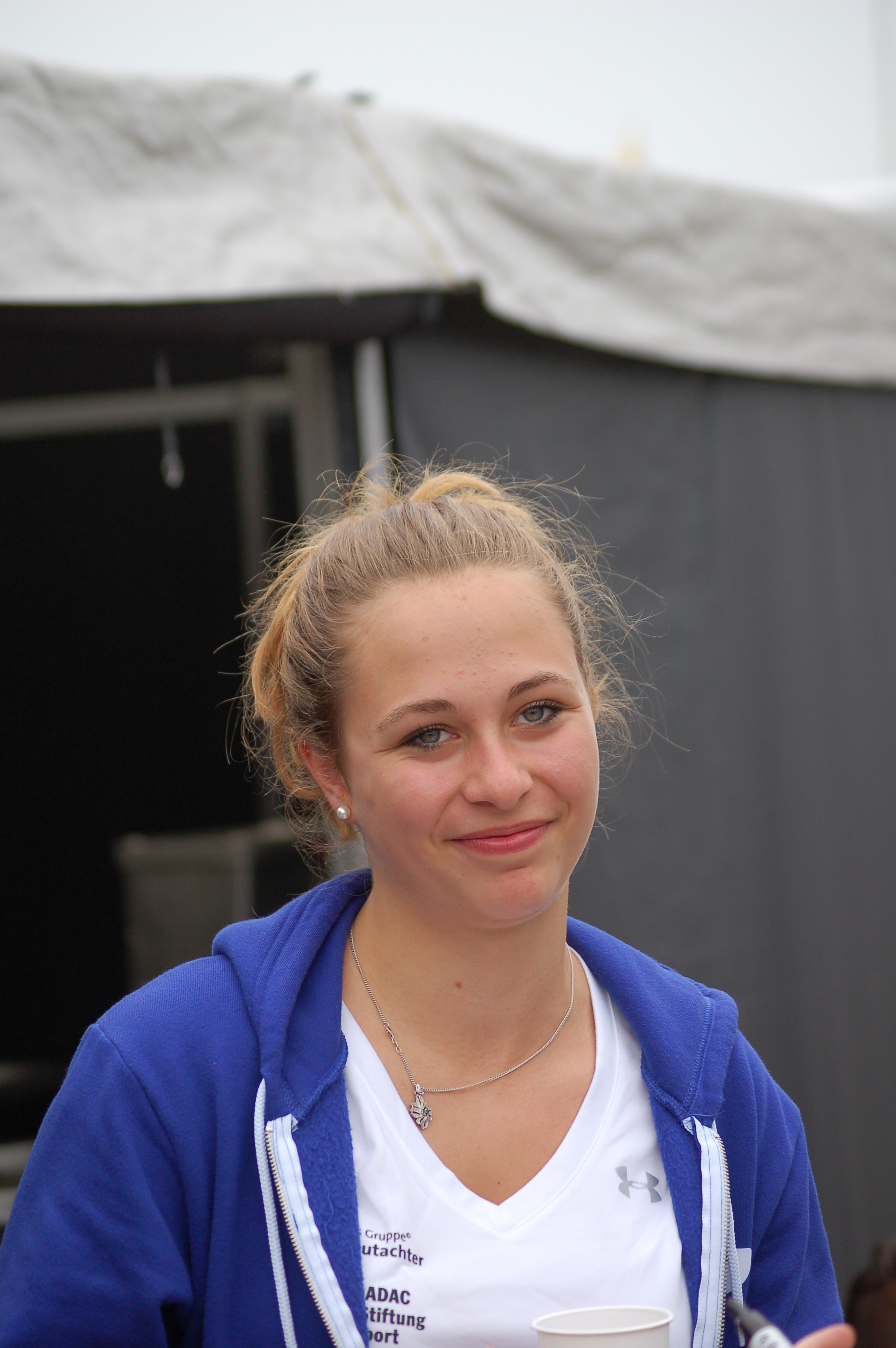
Sophia Flörsch (pictured in 2016) sustained spinal injuries in a major accident on the main race's fourth lap.

Further on in the lap, the race was stopped due to a major accident at Lisboa corner. The yellow lights remained illuminated between the Mandarin Oriental Bend turn and Lisboa corner despite green flag conditions. Some drivers slowed more than predicted in response. Daruvala slowed and Flörsch was tucked into his slipstream. Flörsch hit Daruvala's right-rear wheel, causing Flörsch to spin through 90 degrees to the right. She made contact with a crash barrier at high speed, which removed the left-hand side wheels from her vehicle. She entered Lisboa corner's speed trap at 276.2 km/h (171.6 mph). Flörsch's trajectory caused her to hit newly-installed raised kerbs on the right of Lisboa corner, which lifted her vehicle slightly airborne. The lift raised her car high enough to hit the roll hoop of Tsuboi's vehicle with her car's wheels. Flörsch, who removed her hands from her steering wheel, catapulted backwards to the top of a catch fence and went through it after it absorbed a large amount of impact force. With the speed of her car greatly reduced from the collision, it struck a photographer's bunker backwards with its roll hoop and cockpit, before it was flipped upwards. The photographer's bunker was heavily damaged by the collision and significantly shifted.

Flörsch's car fell onto an armco barrier below the marshal's post and was covered in fire extinguisher foam that had automatically engaged. Around 40 seconds later, track marshals tended to Flörsch and medical personnel arrived at the crash area half a minute later. She was conscious and in pain due to a fractured C7 and T3 vertebrae in her upper body, while Tsuboi had lower back pain. Three other people sustained injuries: photographer Chan Weng-wang, who stood below the photographer's stand, suffered a liver injury, a second photographer, Minami Hiroyuki, who was on the left side of the photographer's stand, sustained a concussion, and track marshal Chan Chak-in suffered a cut face, abrasion of the upper abdomen and a broken jaw. All five were transported to the Conde S. Januário Hospital for treatment. No one was killed. Repairs to the barrier, tending to the injured and a track cleanup lasted for more than an hour before racing could resume.

At the lap-seven restart, Ticktum broke away to lead significantly over Fenestraz. Eriksson then slipstreamed and out-braked Fenestraz on the inside to retake the second position at Lisboa corner. Two laps later, Ahmed crashed at Moorish Hill bend and retired from eleventh place. The safety car was subsequently dispatched because track marshals required space to extricate his car via a crane. The race restarted on the eleventh lap. Ticktum carried enough speed through the Fisherman's Bend and the Reservoir Bend corners to lead his teammate Eriksson by 0.721 seconds at the lap's end. However, Eriksson slipstreamed Ticktum but only to the extent that he drew alongside the left-hand side of the latter's car going into Lisboa corner's braking zone. Ticktum held his lead on the ideal line and extended his lead to 1.028 seconds at the end of lap 12. He further increased this by 1.513 seconds and by another 0.037 seconds to start the final lap. Eriksson could not respond to his teammate Ticktum's advantage and the latter crossed the start/finish line to win his second Macau Grand Prix in a row. (Note: Ticktum was the first driver since Darren Manning in the 1999 race to start from pole position in the two races and win both of them with the fastest lap.) Ticktum became the third driver in the history of the race to win it back-to-back after Edoardo Mortara in 2009 and 2010 and Felix Rosenqvist in 2014 and 2015. Eriksson was 1.208 seconds behind in second and Fenestraz completed the podium in third. Off the podium, Hughes finished fourth, Schumacher fifth and Aron sixth. Ilott placed seventh after Vips (who overtook him on the final lap) was given a 40-second time penalty for an overtake under red flag conditions. The final finishers were Armstrong, Shwartzman, Habsburg, Zhou, Daruvala, Miyata, Sekiguchi, Vesti, Oyu, Katayama, Sakaguchi, Vips and Kumita.

=== Post-race ===
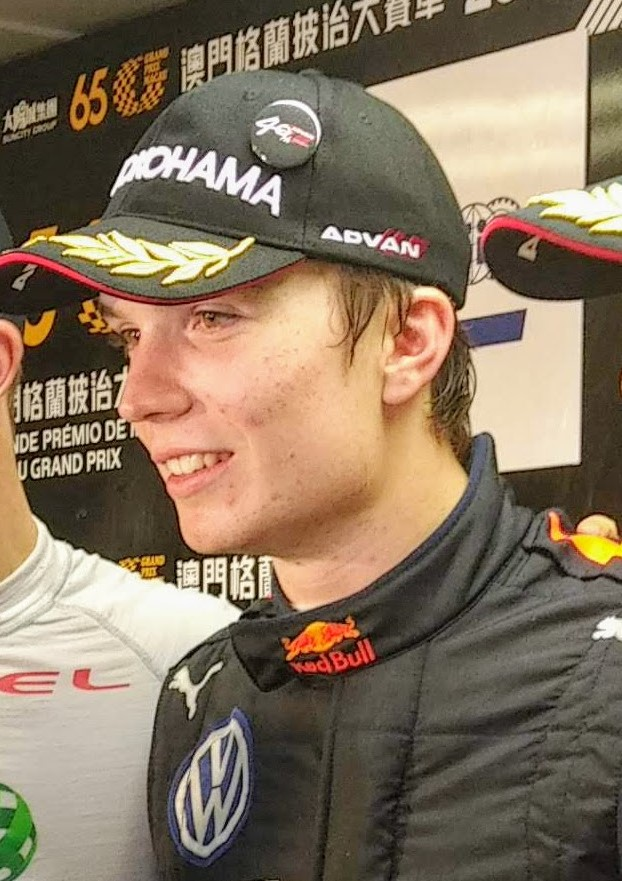
Dan Ticktum was the third driver to win the Macau Grand Prix in consecutive years.

The top three drivers appeared on the podium to collect their trophies and spoke to the media in a later press conference. Ticktum spoke of the "perfect weekend" that allowed him to win the race and thanked his team, "I can't really remember a weekend where I've performed so well, and that's not only just me, it's all the people around me, all the support I've had. It's been just the perfect weekend." Eriksson said that he fell back behind his teammate Ticktum before the safety car was withdrawn and spoke of a "tough race", "The overtake on Sacha was quite tight. But I knew I needed to pass him early in the race to have a chance on Dan, because I knew he was quick all weekend and I had the same speed as him." Third-placed Fenestraz stated it was the best finish he could attain due to Eriksson and Ticktum's fast pace, "Obviously I wanted the win, but for my second time here it's pretty good. I'm already looking forward to next year. I think I did a really good job. It was going to be hard to beat Dan [and Eriksson]. They were quick all weekend. It's true we had an advantage with the new tyres, but with the red flag and all that stuff you cannot take the most out of it, I would say. I still had a little advantage, but they were [too] fast."

Flörsch's crash overshadowed the race. She had an 11-hour operation on her back on 19 November and surgeons removed a bone splinter that was close to her spinal cord. They removed a bone from her hip and used it to form a new hip; a titanium plate was installed to support it. Flörsch vomited from taking painkillers and rendered unmovable for five days as she lost 5 kg (11 lb) of muscle mass and had a large amount of hip ache. She was released from hospital on 26 November and flew to Germany. Tsuboi and Miniami were discharged from hospital shortly after while Chan was hospitalised for a ten-day surgery to his lacerated liver. Flörsch began rehabilitation in early December 2018 to ensure she lost no more muscle strength and to strengthen her body with weights on a gradual scale. She said she remembered everything about the crash, "It probably is a miracle, but that's probably also the reason why I am happy and why I am normal. It happened quite fast – the top speed was 275 km/h (171 mph) – but I can do nearly everything again so, for me, it's just to be happy and to continue to be positive. I remember everything from the crash. It felt just completely different for me because it just happened so fast."

Jean Todt, president of the FIA, announced that the crash would be investigated. The governing body seized video footage from Flörsch's on-board television camera and those of the drivers she was close by when the accident happened. (Note: No official television footage of the accident exists but spectator videos of it were published on social media.) Van Amersfoort Racing (VAR) team owner Fritz van Amersfoort spoke of his belief that the accident could have occurred on other circuits, and the FIA's race director Charlie Whiting stated that the Guia Circuit was not dangerous and no major alterations to its configuration were necessary. Grand Prix Drivers' Association director and Haas F1 driver Romain Grosjean said its members would probably raise the issue of raised kerbs on the right of Lisboa corner with the FIA; the crash reminded him of Konstantin Tereshchenko's accident in a GP3 Series race at the Circuit de Spa-Francorchamps in 2014. According to Jonathan Noble of motorsport.com and racing driver Ryan Lewis, the installation of raised kerbs prevented Flörsch's car striking the cockpit sidepod of Tsuboi's vehicle in a similar style to Takuma Sato and Nick Heidfeld's crash at the 2002 Austrian Grand Prix. In May 2021, the front wing from Flörsch's car was returned to VAR after the team noticed it going up for sale on an online auction and filed a complaint with the Macau police who recovered it.

=== Main race classification ===
Final main race classification
Pos	No.	Driver	Team	Laps	Time/Retired	Grid
1	1	Dan Ticktum (GBR)	Motopark Academy	15	1:46.22.108	1
2	2	Joel Eriksson (SWE)	Motopark Academy	15	+1.208	2
3	19	Sacha Fenestraz (FRA)	Carlin	15	+2.505	4
4	30	Jake Hughes (GBR)	Hitech GP	15	+3.521	5
5	9	Mick Schumacher (DEU)	SJM Theodore Racing by Prema	15	+4.542	6
6	10	Ralf Aron (EST)	SJM Theodore Racing by Prema	15	+6.406	9
7	18	Callum Ilott (GBR)	Carlin	15	+8.340	3
8	11	Marcus Armstrong (ITA)	SJM Theodore Racing by Prema	15	+9.597	8
9	12	Robert Shwartzman (RUS)	SJM Theodore Racing by Prema	15	+11.840	10
10	5	Ferdinand Habsburg (AUT)	Motopark Academy	15	+12.793	13
11	8	Guanyu Zhou (CHN)	SJM Theodore Racing by Prema	15	+13.461	24
12	17	Jehan Daruvala (IND)	Carlin	15	+13.985	17
13	32	Ritomo Miyata (JPN)	Team TOM'S	15	+16.934	26
14	15	Yuhi Sekiguchi (JPN)	B-Max Racing Team	15	+18.697	14
15	26	Frederik Vesti (DNK)	Van Amersfoort Racing	15	+19.773	25
16	22	Toshiki Oyu (JPN)	Toda Racing	15	+23.348	21
17	20	Yoshiaki Katayama (JPN)	Carlin	15	+32.873	27
18	21	Sena Sakaguchi (JPN)	Toda Racing	15	+35.245	28
19	3	Jüri Vips (EST)	Motopark Academy	15	+46.952^{1}	7
20	33	"Dragon" (JPN)	B-Max Racing Team	15	+1:48.963	23
Ret	29	Enaam Ahmed (GBR)	Hitech GP	8	Accident	15
Ret	31	Sho Tsuboi (JPN)	Team TOM'S	3	Accident	16
Ret	25	Sophia Flörsch (DEU)	Van Amersfoort Racing	3	Accident	19
Ret	27	Ukyo Sasahara (JPN)	ThreeBond Racing	1	Accident damage	22
Ret	6	Marino Sato (JPN)	Motopark Academy	0	Accident	11
Ret	16	Álex Palou (ESP)	B-Max Racing Team	0	Accident	12
Ret	28	Hon Chio Leong (MAC)	Hitech GP	0	Accident	18
Ret	23	Keyvan Andres (IRN)	Van Amersfoort Racing	0	Accident	20
Fastest lap: Dan Ticktum, 2:10.246, 169.1 km/h (105.1 mph) on lap 13

Notes:

- ^1 – Jüri Vips was penalised 40 seconds for passing under red flag conditions.

== See also ==
- 2018 FIA GT World Cup
- 2018 Guia Race of Macau
