= 2022 Super Formula Lights =

Motor racing competition

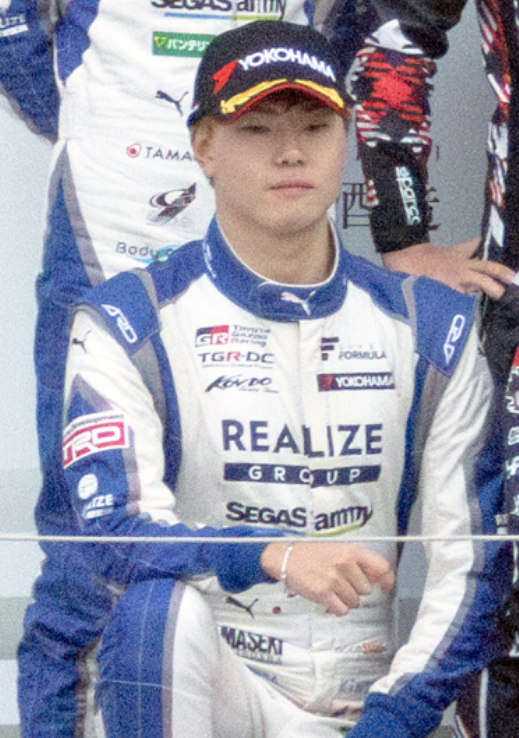
Kazuto Kotaka (pictured in 2024) took the Drivers' Championship title driving for TOM'S.

The 2022 Super Formula Lights Championship was the third Super Formula Lights Championship season, after the Japanese Formula 3 Championship was rebranded following the end of the 2019 season. It featured drivers competing in Dallara 320 chassis and with engines made by three different manufacturers, a similar regulation format to the Euroformula Open Championship.

After 18 races over six rounds, Kazuto Kotaka took the Drivers' Championship, while his team, TOM'S, took the Teams' Championship and the Manufacturers' Championship. Nobuhiro Imada (B-Max Racing Team) won the Masters' Cup.

== Teams and drivers ==
| Team | Engine | No. | Driver | Status | Rounds |
|---|---|---|---|---|---|
| B-Max Racing Team | Spiess A41 | 1 | (Japan) Iori Kimura | | All |
| B-Max Racing Team | Spiess A41 | 4 | (Japan) Nobuhiro Imada | M | All |
| B-Max Racing Team | Spiess A41 | 30 | (Japan) "Dragon" | M | All |
| B-Max Racing Team | Spiess A41 | 50 | (Japan) Togo Suganami | | All |
| B-Max Racing Team | Spiess A41 | 98 | (Spain) Roberto Merhi | | 6 |
| Toda Racing | Spiess A41 | 2 | (Japan) Kakunoshin Ohta | | All |
| Rn-Sports | Spiess A41 | 10 | (Japan) Kohta Kawaai | | 1, 3–5 |
| Rn-Sports | Spiess A41 | 10 | (Japan) Seiya Motojima | | 2, 6 |
| Rn-Sports | Spiess A41 | 11 | (Japan) Masayuki Ueda | M | 1–2 |
| TOM'S | TOM'S TAZ31 | 35 | (Japan) Seita Nonaka | | All |
| TOM'S | TOM'S TAZ31 | 36 | (Japan) Yuga Furutani | | All |
| TOM'S | TOM'S TAZ31 | 37 | (Japan) Kazuto Kotaka | | All |
| TOM'S | TOM'S TAZ31 | 38 | (Japan) Hibiki Taira | | All |
| HELM Motorsports | Tomei TB14F3 2020 | 62 | (Japan) Yuya Hiraki | | 1–5 |
| HELM Motorsports | Tomei TB14F3 2020 | 63 | (Japan) Reiji Hiraki | | 1–5 |

| Icon | Class |
|---|---|
| M | Masters' Cup. |

== Race Calendar & Results ==
The calendar for the 2022 season was announced on 25 November 2021. The championship supported Super Formula at five of its six events. The season finale was held over the Okayama Challenge Cup weekend.

| Round | | Circuit | Date | Pole position | Fastest lap | Winning driver | Winning team | Masters winner |
|---|---|---|---|---|---|---|---|---|
| 1 | R1 | Fuji Speedway | 9 April | (Japan) Kohta Kawaai | (Japan) Kazuto Kotaka | (Japan) Seita Nonaka | TOM'S | (Japan) Masayuki Ueda |
| 1 | R2 | Fuji Speedway | 10 April | (Japan) Kazuto Kotaka | (Japan) Kakunoshin Ohta | (Japan) Kazuto Kotaka | TOM'S | (Japan) "Dragon" |
| 1 | R3 | Fuji Speedway | 10 April | | (Japan) Hibiki Taira | (Japan) Hibiki Taira | TOM'S | (Japan) "Dragon" |
| 2 | R4 | Suzuka International Racing Course | 23 April | (Japan) Kazuto Kotaka | (Japan) Kakunoshin Ohta | (Japan) Kazuto Kotaka | TOM'S | (Japan) Nobuhiro Imada |
| 2 | R5 | Suzuka International Racing Course | 24 April | (Japan) Kakunoshin Ohta | (Japan) Kakunoshin Ohta | (Japan) Kakunoshin Ohta | Toda Racing | (Japan) Nobuhiro Imada |
| 2 | R6 | Suzuka International Racing Course | 24 April | | (Japan) Iori Kimura | (Japan) Kazuto Kotaka | TOM'S | (Japan) "Dragon" |
| 3 | R7 | Autopolis | 21 May | (Japan) Kakunoshin Ohta | (Japan) Iori Kimura | (Japan) Iori Kimura | B-Max Racing Team | (Japan) Nobuhiro Imada |
| 3 | R8 | Autopolis | 21 May | (Japan) Kakunoshin Ohta | (Japan) Kakunoshin Ohta | (Japan) Kakunoshin Ohta | Toda Racing | (Japan) "Dragon" |
| 3 | R9 | Autopolis | 22 May | | (Japan) Iori Kimura | (Japan) Iori Kimura | B-Max Racing Team | (Japan) Nobuhiro Imada |
| 4 | R10 | Sportsland SUGO | 18 June | (Japan) Kakunoshin Ohta | (Japan) Kazuto Kotaka | (Japan) Kazuto Kotaka | TOM'S | (Japan) Nobuhiro Imada |
| 4 | R11 | Sportsland SUGO | 19 June | (Japan) Kazuto Kotaka | (Japan) Kakunoshin Ohta | (Japan) Kazuto Kotaka | TOM'S | (Japan) Nobuhiro Imada |
| 4 | R12 | Sportsland SUGO | 19 June | | (Japan) Seita Nonaka | (Japan) Kazuto Kotaka | TOM'S | (Japan) Nobuhiro Imada |
| 5 | R13 | Mobility Resort Motegi | 20 August | (Japan) Iori Kimura | (Japan) Kazuto Kotaka | (Japan) Kazuto Kotaka | TOM'S | (Japan) "Dragon" |
| 5 | R14 | Mobility Resort Motegi | 21 August | (Japan) Kakunoshin Ohta | (Japan) Kakunoshin Ohta | (Japan) Hibiki Taira | TOM'S | (Japan) Nobuhiro Imada |
| 5 | R15 | Mobility Resort Motegi | 21 August | | (Japan) Iori Kimura | (Japan) Iori Kimura | B-Max Racing Team | (Japan) Nobuhiro Imada |
| 6 | R16 | Okayama International Circuit | 24 September | (Japan) Kakunoshin Ohta | (Japan) Kakunoshin Ohta | (Japan) Kakunoshin Ohta | Toda Racing | (Japan) Nobuhiro Imada |
| 6 | R17 | Okayama International Circuit | 25 September | (Japan) Iori Kimura | (Japan) Iori Kimura | (Japan) Kazuto Kotaka | TOM'S | No finishers |
| 6 | R18 | Okayama International Circuit | 25 September | | (Japan) Iori Kimura | (Japan) Kakunoshin Ohta | Toda Racing | (Japan) "Dragon" |

== Season report ==
The championship began in early April at Fuji Speedway with Kohta Kawaai taking a surprise debut pole. He was overtaken at the start by Kakunoshin Ohta and then rear-ended him into the next turn, causing Ohta to retire and Kawaai dropping down the field. The new lead trio of Seita Nonaka, Iori Kimura and Hibiki Taira pulled away to finish in that order. The second race was also decided by the time lap one was over: Kazuto Kotaka led Ohta from pole, while Taira passed Kawaai for third. The pair remained busy fighting each other all race, so Kotaka and Ohta were free to pull away and finish first and second. Race three started with Taira passing both Nonaka and Kimura around the outside of turn 1 to claim the lead. Kimura then passed Nonaka and held him behind until the finish. Two third places and a win granted Taira the championship lead.

Two weeks later, the second round at Suzuka International Racing Course started with Kotaka taking pole for the first race. Ohta started second, Nonaka third and those positions stood unchanged until the end. Race two was a very wet one, Ohta on pole had to fight off one attack from Nonaka, who was then overtaken by Kotaka when that attempt failed. Nonaka then aquaplaned off in turn three later on, so Yuga Furutani was able to gain his maiden podium. The final race was wet, too, and Ohta used his drier start position to move past Kotaka into first, with Furutani doing the same to Nonaka for third. Ohta pulled away, but Kotaka was able to reel him back in and attack him through the last two laps, passing him in the end. Their efforts over the weekend saw Kotaka take the championship lead and Ohta second in the standings, six points back.

The third round was held at Autopolis. Race one began with two drivers stalling on the grid, and poleman Ohta was overtaken by Kimura. He then pulled away, and Nonaka began closing in on Ohta, but did not come in attacking range. The second race began with a collision, as Togo Suganami had a slow start from second and was defending from Kimura before crashing into Ohta. On the restart, the gaps at the front quickly grew, and Ohta won the race. A flurry of penalties meant he was joined on the podium by Furutani and Nonaka. Kimura was among those who were penalized, but came back to win race three in a dominant lights-to-flag display, only dropping behind Ohta shortly before turn one. Nonaka was third and ex-championship leader Kotaka grabbed his third sixth place in as many races, ceding the lead to Ohta by 19 points.

The second half of the season began at Sportsland SUGO, and race one had chaos from the start that took out Suganami, while Kotaka moved past Ohta for the lead. On the restart, Kimura hit Ohta's rear and the resulting oil leaking on track caused a lengthy red flag. Kotaka restarted from the lead and avoided further drama, while behind him Taira and Reiji Hiraki eventually completed the podium. The second race was more straightforward, with Kotaka winning from pole as Furutani dispatched Ohta behind him and the trio finished that way. Race three looked much the same for Kotaka, although his gap to Taira in second was not as dominant. Nonaka was third, and Kotaka's triple win sent him back into the championship lead, demoting Ohta to second place with a margin of four points. Taira was a distant third, a further 26 points back.

The Mobility Resort Motegi was the host of the next round, and a wet track caused wheelspin for race one polesitter Kimura, who was then overtaken by Kotaka, Ohta and Suganami. Kotaka pulled away into the distance, as the others had to contend with limited visibility. Ohta came second and Kimura third, after Suganami made a mistake and dropped back. Race two began chaotic, with Taira taking the lead, while Ohta and Kimura sustained damage behind him. This promoted Nonaka and Suganami to the podium. The weather for race three was better, and Kimura ended his weekend with a bang, slicing past Ohta and then Kotaka to claim the lead, while the other podium positions did not change. Kotaka's two podiums meant he widened his gap in the standings to 13 points, while Kimura's strong showing promoted him to third, 34 points from Ohta.

The season concluded at Okayama International Circuit, and Ohta took pole for race one. He converted pole to win in a race where overtakes were hard to come by, and Kimura and Kotaka completed the podium. Race two saw Kotaka pass polesitter Kimura at the start, with the lead gap staying very close all race, but Kimura could not produce an attack on the leader. Ohta was third, and started the final race of the season from pole. He had to defend from Kimura once at the start, and after that it was processional once again, with Nonaka in third and soon-to-be champion Kotaka in fourth. Dropped scores came into play and Kotaka's four-point gap to Ohta grew to six points at the end of the season as he took a deserved championship with eight wins from 18 races. Kimura solidified third in the standings, and Nonaka came fourth in the end.

== Championship standings ==
The points were awarded as follows:

| 1 | 2 | 3 | 4 | 5 | 6 | PP | FL |
|---|---|---|---|---|---|---|---|
| 10 | 7 | 5 | 3 | 2 | 1 | 1 | 1 |

Every drivers' four worst results were dropped.

=== Drivers' Championships ===
==== Overall ====
| Pos | Driver | FUJ | | | SUZ | | | AUT | | | SUG | | | MOT | | | OKA | | | Points |
| Pos | Driver | R1 | R2 | R3 | R1 | R2 | R3 | R1 | R2 | R3 | R1 | R2 | R3 | R1 | R2 | R3 | R1 | R2 | R3 | Points |
|---|---|---|---|---|---|---|---|---|---|---|---|---|---|---|---|---|---|---|---|---|
| 1 | (Japan) Kazuto Kotaka | 4 | 1 | 7 | 1 | 2 | 1 | 6 | 6 | 6 | 1 | 1 | 1 | 1 | 4 | 2 | 3 | 1 | 4 | 114 |
| 2 | (Japan) Kakunoshin Ohta | Ret | 2 | 4 | 2 | 1 | 2 | 2 | 1 | 2 | Ret | 3 | 5 | 2 | 9 | 4 | 1 | 3 | 1 | 108 |
| 3 | (Japan) Iori Kimura | 2 | 6 | 2 | 5 | 5 | 7 | 1 | 8 | 1 | Ret | 5 | 6 | 3 | Ret | 1 | 2 | 2 | 2 | 85 |
| 4 | (Japan) Seita Nonaka | 1 | 5 | 3 | 3 | 12 | 6 | 3 | 3 | 3 | 4 | 6 | 3 | 9 | 2 | 8 | 4 | 7 | 3 | 63 |
| 5 | (Japan) Hibiki Taira | 3 | 3 | 1 | 7 | 4 | 5 | 4 | Ret | 5 | 2 | 4 | 2 | 10 | 1 | 7 | 6 | 6 | 5 | 62 |
| 6 | (Japan) Yuga Furutani | 7 | 7 | 9 | 4 | 3 | 3 | 8 | 2 | 7 | 5 | 2 | 4 | 4 | 5 | 3 | 7 | 5 | 6 | 45 |
| 7 | (Japan) Togo Suganami | 5 | 9 | 5 | 6 | 6 | 4 | 5 | 10 | 4 | Ret | 7 | 8 | 7 | 3 | 6 | 5 | 4 | 8 | 25 |
| 8 | (Japan) Kohta Kawaai | Ret | 4 | 6 | | | | 9 | Ret | 9 | Ret | 8 | Ret | 5 | 6 | 5 | | | | 10 |
| 9 | (Japan) Reiji Hiraki | 6 | 8 | 8 | 9 | 7 | 9 | 7 | 4 | 8 | 3 | 12 | 7 | WD | WD | WD | | | | 9 |
| 10 | (Japan) Yuya Hiraki | 8 | 10 | 10 | 10 | 9 | 10 | 10 | 5 | 10 | 8 | 10 | Ret | WD | WD | WD | | | | 2 |
| 11 | (Japan) "Dragon" | Ret | 11 | 11 | 12 | 10 | 11 | 12 | 7 | 12 | 7 | 11 | 10 | 6 | 8 | Ret | 11 | Ret | 10 | 1 |
| 12 | (Japan) Nobuhiro Imada | Ret | 12 | 12 | 11 | 8 | 12 | 11 | 9 | 11 | 6 | 9 | 9 | 8 | 7 | 9 | 10 | Ret | 11 | 1 |
| 13 | (Japan) Seiya Motojima | | | | 8 | Ret | 8 | | | | | | | | | | 8 | 8 | 7 | 0 |
| 14 | (Spain) Roberto Merhi | | | | | | | | | | | | | | | | 9 | Ret | 9 | 0 |
| 15 | (Japan) Masayuki Ueda | 9 | 13 | 13 | 13 | 11 | 13 | | | | | | | | | | | | | 0 |
| Pos | Driver | R1 | R2 | R3 | R1 | R2 | R3 | R1 | R2 | R3 | R1 | R2 | R3 | R1 | R2 | R3 | R1 | R2 | R3 | Points |
| Pos | Driver | FUJ | | | SUZ | | | AUT | | | SUG | | | MOT | | | OKA | | | Points |

==== Masters Class ====
| Pos | Driver | FUJ | | | SUZ | | | AUT | | | SUG | | | MOT | | | OKA | | | Points |
| Pos | Driver | R1 | R2 | R3 | R1 | R2 | R3 | R1 | R2 | R3 | R1 | R2 | R3 | R1 | R2 | R3 | R1 | R2 | R3 | Points |
|---|---|---|---|---|---|---|---|---|---|---|---|---|---|---|---|---|---|---|---|---|
| 1 | (Japan) Nobuhiro Imada | Ret | 2 | 2 | 1 | 1 | 2 | 1 | 2 | 1 | 1 | 1 | 1 | 2 | 1 | 1 | 1 | Ret | 2 | 143 |
| 2 | (Japan) "Dragon" | Ret | 1 | 1 | 2 | 2 | 1 | 2 | 1 | 2 | 2 | 2 | 2 | 1 | 2 | Ret | 2 | Ret | 1 | 126 |
| 3 | (Japan) Masayuki Ueda | 1 | 3 | 3 | 3 | 3 | 3 | | | | | | | | | | | | | 35 |
| Pos | Driver | R1 | R2 | R3 | R1 | R2 | R3 | R1 | R2 | R3 | R1 | R2 | R3 | R1 | R2 | R3 | R1 | R2 | R3 | Points |
| Pos | Driver | FUJ | | | SUZ | | | AUT | | | SUG | | | MOT | | | OKA | | | Points |

=== Teams' standings ===
| Pos | Team | FUJ | | | SUZ | | | AUT | | | SUG | | | MOT | | | OKA | | | Points |
| Pos | Team | R1 | R2 | R3 | R1 | R2 | R3 | R1 | R2 | R3 | R1 | R2 | R3 | R1 | R2 | R3 | R1 | R2 | R3 | Points |
|---|---|---|---|---|---|---|---|---|---|---|---|---|---|---|---|---|---|---|---|---|
| 1 | TOM'S | 1 | 1 | 1 | 1 | 2 | 1 | 3 | 2 | 3 | 1 | 1 | 1 | 1 | 1 | 2 | 3 | 1 | 3 | 151 |
| 2 | Toda Racing | Ret | 2 | 4 | 2 | 1 | 2 | 2 | 1 | 2 | Ret | 3 | 5 | 2 | 9 | 4 | 1 | 3 | 1 | 100 |
| 3 | B-Max Racing Team | 2 | 6 | 2 | 5 | 5 | 4 | 1 | 7 | 1 | 6 | 5 | 6 | 3 | 3 | 1 | 2 | 2 | 2 | 87 |
| 4 | HELM Motorsports | 6 | 8 | 8 | 9 | 7 | 9 | 7 | 4 | 8 | 3 | 7 | 10 | WD | WD | WD | | | | 9 |
| 5 | Rn-Sports | 9 | 4 | 6 | 8 | 11 | 8 | 9 | Ret | 9 | Ret | 8 | Ret | 5 | 6 | 5 | 8 | 8 | 7 | 9 |
| Pos | Team | R1 | R2 | R3 | R1 | R2 | R3 | R1 | R2 | R3 | R1 | R2 | R3 | R1 | R2 | R3 | R1 | R2 | R3 | Points |
| Pos | Team | FUJ | | | SUZ | | | AUT | | | SUG | | | MOT | | | OKA | | | Points |

=== Engine manufacturer standings ===
| Pos | Engine manufacturer | FUJ | | | SUZ | | | AUT | | | SUG | | | MOT | | | OKA | | | Points |
| Pos | Engine manufacturer | R1 | R2 | R3 | R1 | R2 | R3 | R1 | R2 | R3 | R1 | R2 | R3 | R1 | R2 | R3 | R1 | R2 | R3 | Points |
|---|---|---|---|---|---|---|---|---|---|---|---|---|---|---|---|---|---|---|---|---|
| 1 | TOM'S | 1 | 1 | 1 | 1 | 2 | 1 | 3 | 2 | 3 | 1 | 1 | 1 | 1 | 1 | 2 | 3 | 1 | 3 | 151 |
| 2 | Siegfried Spiess Motorenbau | 2 | 2 | 2 | 2 | 1 | 2 | 1 | 1 | 1 | 6 | 3 | 5 | 2 | 3 | 1 | 1 | 2 | 1 | 132 |
| 3 | Tomei Engine | 6 | 8 | 8 | 9 | 7 | 9 | 7 | 4 | 8 | 3 | 7 | 10 | WD | WD | WD | | | | 9 |
| Pos | Engine manufacturer | R1 | R2 | R3 | R1 | R2 | R3 | R1 | R2 | R3 | R1 | R2 | R3 | R1 | R2 | R3 | R1 | R2 | R3 | Points |
| Pos | Engine manufacturer | FUJ | | | SUZ | | | AUT | | | SUG | | | MOT | | | OKA | | | Points |
