= Riki Okusa =

Japanese racing driver

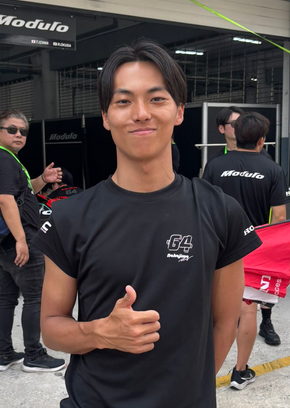
- Okusa at the 2025 Super GT Malaysia Festival
- Nationality: (Japan) Japanese
- Born: 25 November 1999 (age 26) Hiratsuka, Kanagawa, Japan

Super GT - GT500 career
- Debut season: 2024
- Current team: Nakajima Racing
- Categorisation: FIA Silver
- Car number: 64
- Starts: 8
- Wins: 0
- Podiums: 1
- Poles: 0
- Fastest laps: 0
- Best finish: 13th in 2025

Previous series
- 2023 2022-2023 2021 2020-22 2018: Super Formula Championship; Super GT - GT300; Porsche Carrera Cup Japan; Formula Regional Japanese Championship; Japanese Formula 3 Championship

Riki Okusa (大草 りき, Ōkusa Riki) (born November 25, 1999) is a Japanese racing driver. He currently competes in the GT500 class in Super GT for Nakajima Racing for the 2024 season and previously in the GT300 class in for GAINER, partnered with Hironobu Yasuda.

== Racing career ==
=== Early career ===
In 2018, Okusa made his formula racing debut in the final round of the Japanese Formula 3 Championship, finishing fifth in his first race. The following year, he contested the shootout for Honda's Suzuka Circuit Racing School scholarship, but lost out to current Formula 2 driver Ayumu Iwasa. After spending 2019 starring in Super Taikyū, where he claimed the championship title in the ST-3 class, Okusa returned to formula racing in the inaugural season of the Formula Regional Japanese Championship, claiming the first podium of his formula racing career by finishing third in a one-off appearance at Fuji Speedway. In Super Taikyū, he switched to the ST-TCR class, ultimately finishing as championship runner-up alongside Katsumasa Chiyo and mentor Hironobu Yasuda. He returned to the Formula Regional Japanese championship in 2021 with his personal sponsor's eponymous team, PONOS Racing. Although he only competed in three rounds, Okusa managed to clinch third place in the standings, with two wins and seven podiums to his name. Okusa made another two cameos again at 2022 Formula Regional Japanese Championship with Sutekina Racing, claiming a win, a pole position, and three podiums.

=== Super GT ===
Okusa made his debut in Super GT's GT300 class with GAINER, paired up alongside Ryūichiro Tomita and third driver Yūsuke Shiotsu. Okusa made an immediate impact, qualifying in third on debut in Okayama and taking his first win at the next round at Fuji Speedway. He would ultimately take his maiden pole position and two more podiums throughout the season to finish third in the standings, three points behind the championship-winning car of Kondō Racing. In 2023, Okusa paired up with his longtime mentor and 2008 GT300 class champion Hironobu Yasuda.

In 2024, Okusa moved to GT500, as he moved to Nakajima Racing alongside Takuya Izawa.

=== Super Formula ===
In 2023, Okusa made his Super Formula debut with TGM Grand Prix, replacing the outgoing Toshiki Oyu at Suzuka Circuit. He performed admirably on debut, finishing ahead of full-time teammate Cem Bölükbaşı in both races.

== Racing record ==
=== Career summary ===
Season	Series	Team	Races	Wins	Poles	FLaps	Podiums	Points	Position
2018	Japanese Formula 3 Championship	Hanashima Racing	2	0	0	0	0	2	10th
2018	Super Taikyu - ST3	Techno First Racing Team	6	0	0	0	1	71.5‡	6th‡
2019	Super Taikyu - ST3	Techno First	6	2	0	0	2	122‡	**1st‡**
2020	Formula Regional Japanese Championship	Zap Speed	2	0	0	0	1	25	14th
2020	Super Taikyu - ST-TCR	Waimarama Kizuna Racing	5	2	0	2	4	102.5‡	**2nd‡**
2021	Formula Regional Japanese Championship	PONOS Racing	7	2	4	2	7	140	**3rd**
2021	Porsche Carrera Cup Japan	Porsche Japan	11	0	0	0	2	144	4th
2021	Super Taikyu - ST-Z	Porsche Team EBI Waimarama	6	1	0	0	1	52.5‡	7th‡
2022	Super GT - GT300	GAINER	8	1	1	0	3	49	**3rd**
2022	Formula Regional Japanese Championship	Sutekina Racing	6	1	2	1	3	63	10th
2022	Super Taikyu - ST-Z	Porsche Team EBI Waimarama	6	1	1	3	2	80‡	5th‡
2023	Super GT - GT300	GAINER	8	0	0	0	0	16	17th
2023	Super Formula	TGM Grand Prix	2	0	0	0	0	0	23rd
2023	Super Taikyu - ST-Z	Techno First	7	1	1	0	2	99‡	**3rd‡**
2024	Super GT - GT500	Modulo Nakajima Racing	8	0	1	0	0	11	13th
2024	Super Taikyu - ST-Z	Techno First							
2025	Super GT - GT500	Modulo Nakajima Racing	8	0	0	0	1	23.5	13th
2025	Super Taikyu - ST-Z	Techno First							
2026	Super GT - GT500	Modulo Nakajima Racing	8	0	3	2	1	18	14th
2026	Super Taikyu - ST-Z	Techno First							

‡ Team standings

=== Complete Japanese Formula 3 Championship results ===
(key) (Races in bold indicate pole position) (Races in italics indicate fastest lap)

Year	Team	Engine	1	2	3	4	5	6	7	8	9	10	11	12	13	14	15	16	17	18	19	20	21	Pos	Points
2018	Hanashima Racing	Toyota TOM'S	SUZ; 1	SUZ; 2	SUG1; 1	SUG1; 2	FUJ1; 1	FUJ1; 2	OKA1; 1	OKA1; 2	OKA1; 3	MOT; 1	MOT; 2	MOT; 3	OKA2; 1	OKA2; 2	OKA2; 3	SUG2; 1	SUG2; 2	SUG2; 3	SUG2; 4	FUJ2; 1; 5	FUJ2; 2; 9	10th	2

=== Complete Formula Regional Japanese Championship results ===
(key) (Races in bold indicate pole position) (Races in italics indicate fastest lap)

Year	Entrant	1	2	3	4	5	6	7	8	9	10	11	12	13	14	15	16	17	Pos	Points
2020	Zap Speed	FUJ1; 1	FUJ1; 2	FUJ1; 3	SUG; 1	SUG; 2	SUG; 3	FUJ2; 1; 5	FUJ2; 2; 3	MOT; 1	MOT; 2	OKA; 1	OKA; 2	AUT; 1	AUT; 2				14th	25
2021	PONOS Racing	OKA; 1	OKA; 2	OKA; 3	**MOT**; **1**; 1	MOT; 2; 2	**MOT**; **3**; 1	FUJ; 1	FUJ; 2	FUJ; 3	SUG; 1; 2	SUG; 2; 2	**SUZ**; **1**; 2	**SUZ**; **2**; 2					3rd	140
2022	Team Sutekina	FUJ1; 1	FUJ1; 2	FUJ1; 3	OKA; 1	OKA; 2	OKA; 3	MOT; 1	MOT; 2	MOT; 3	SUG; 1; 6	SUG; 2 Ret	SUG; 3; 3	FUJ2; 1; 1	**FUJ2**; **2**; 3	**FUJ2**; **3** Ret	SUZ; 1	SUZ; 2	10th	63

=== Complete Super GT results ===
(key) (Races in bold indicate pole position) (Races in italics indicate fastest lap)

Year	Team	Car	Class	1	2	3	4	5	6	7	8	9	DC	Pts
2022	GAINER	Nissan GT-R	GT300	OKA; 6	FUJ; 1	SUZ; 15	FUJ; 22	**SUZ**; **2**	SUG; 3	AUT; 7	MOT; 8		3rd	49
2023	GAINER	Nissan GT-R	GT300	OKA; 11	FUJ; 5	SUZ; 8	FUJ; 7	SUZ; 13	SUG; 9	AUT; 10	MOT; 16		17th	16
2024	Modulo Nakajima Racing	Honda Civic Type R-GT	GT500	OKA; 10	FUJ; 12	SUZ; 13	FUJ; 6	SUG; 14	AUT; Ret	**MOT**; 10	SUZ; 13		13th	11
2025	Modulo Nakajima Racing	Honda Civic Type R-GT	GT500	OKA; 9	FUJ; 13	SEP; 10	FS1 (14)	FS2; 8	SUZ; 7	SUG; Ret	AUT; 2	MOT; 12	13th	23.5
2026	Modulo Nakajima Racing	Honda Prelude-GT	GT500	OKA; 13	FUJ; 12	FUJ; Ret	SUZ; 12	**SUG**; 12	**AUT**; 12	**MOT**; 2	MOT; 12		14th	18

^{‡} Half points awarded as less than 75% of race distance was completed.
^{(Number)} Driver did not take part in this sprint race, points are still awarded for the teammate's result.
^{*} Season still in progress.

=== Complete Super Formula results ===
(key) (Races in bold indicate pole position) (Races in italics indicate fastest lap)

Year	Team	Engine	1	2	3	4	5	6	7	8	9	DC	Points
2023	TGM Grand Prix	Honda	FUJ	FUJ	SUZ	AUT	SUG	FUJ	MOT	SUZ; 18	SUZ; 13	23rd	0
