= Ai Miura =

Japanese racing driver

- Nationality: (Japan) Japanese
- Born: 24 November 1989 (age 36)

Formula Regional Japanese Championship career
- Debut season: 2020
- Teams: Super License
- Starts: 15
- Wins: 1
- Podiums: 8
- Poles: 1
- Fastest laps: 1
- Best finish: 2nd in 2021

Championship titles
- 2020, 2023: Kyojo Cup

Ai Miura (三浦愛, Miura Ai; born 24 November 1989 in Nara Prefecture, Japan) is a Japanese female racing driver who last raced in the Formula Regional Japanese Championship.

== Career ==
Miura's single seater career began due to the influence of her father and brother. At the age of twelve, she participated in a kart race for the first time and eventually won the championship. After that, she honed her skills in karting. At Osaka Sangyo University, where she studied Mechanical Engineering, Miura was one of the drivers of their solar car project, participating in the yearly FIA Solar Car Race at the Suzuka Circuit, taking several victories throughout the years.

In 2011, Miura participated in Super FJ (Suzuka) with the support of Exedy in recognition of her success in karting. After graduating from university one year later, she became an employee of Exedy and participated in Formula Challenge Japan (FCJ) while enrolled in the public relations department of the company.

In 2014, Miura made her debut in the Japanese Formula 3 Championship (N class), being the first female driver in the series in eighteen years. She finished on the podium at the opening race held at Suzuka Circuit, and took her first victory in the following second round, finally finishing in fourth place in the series. In 2015, she continued to participate in the N class of the All Japan F3 Championship, winning three races and finishing 2nd.

From 2016 until 2018, Miura was part of the B-MAX Racing Team, achieving a best race result of fourth overall and eighth in the standings (both the best ever for a female in the series). The following year, in 2019, she joined ThreeBond Racing and continued participated in the All-Japan F3 Championship (C class). In 2020, she participated in the KYOJO CUP for LHG Racing with YLT, winning the championship in her first try. In addition, she also took part in a few races in the Formula Regional Japanese Championship in place of Tomoki Takahashi with the Super License team. She took her first podium at the Twin Ring Motegi. In 2021, she finished as runner-up of the championship, taking her first win at Fuji Speedway during the season, while also competing in Super Taikyu.

== Karting record ==
=== Karting career summary ===
Season	Series	Position
2001	SL Meihan Final Round - FP3-F Class	1st
2002	Suzuka Championship - RSO class	
2003	Suzuka Championship - OPEN class	3rd
2003	Suzuka Championship - JRMC class	6th
2004	Rotax Max Junior class	2nd
2004	Suzuka Championship - JRMC class	2nd
2004	Macau International Kart GP - JrMAX Class	11th
2004	Asia Pacific Championship - MAX Class	9th
2005	Rotax Max - Junior class	5th
2005	Suzuka Championship - JRMC class	2nd
2005	EuroChallenge UK round - Junior Class	18th
2006	Rotax Max - Senior class	4th
2006	Mizunami Challenge Cup - RMC Class	2nd
2006	EuroChallenge Italy - Senior Class	31st
2006	EuroChallenge Austria - Senior Class	28th
2006	EuroChallenge Belgium - Senior Class	Ret
2006	Macau International Kart GP SrMAX class	6th
2007	Rotax Max - Senior Class	19th
2007	EuroChallenge - Senior class	
2008	Rotax Max - Senior Class	8th
2008	Japan Open Masters	
2009	Rotax Max - Senior class	11th
2009	Japan Open Masters	
2009	FIA Solar Car Race Suzuka	1st
2010	Rotax Max - Senior class	9th
2010	FIA Solar Car Race Suzuka	1st
2011	FIA Solar Car Race Suzuka	2nd
2012	FIA Solar Car Race Suzuka	1st
2013	FIA Solar Car Race Suzuka	1st
2014	FIA Solar Car Race Suzuka	1st
2016	FIA Solar Car Race Suzuka	1st

== Racing record ==
=== Career summary ===
Season	Series	Team	Races	Wins	Poles	F/Laps	Podiums	Points	Position
2011	Suzuka Clubman Race SFJ Class Series	?	?	?	?	?	?	?	10th
2012	Formula Challenge Japan	Exedy Racing Team	12	0	0	0	0	0	NC
2013	Formula Challenge Japan	Exedy Racing Team	12	0	0	0	0	0	NC
2014	Japanese Formula 3 Championship - National	Exedy Racing Team	15	1	0	0	7	55	4th
2015	Japanese Formula 3 Championship - National	Exedy Racing Team	13	3	2	0	16	123	2nd
2016	Japanese Formula 3 Championship	B-Max Racing Team	17	0	0	0	0	0	NC
2017	Japanese Formula 3 Championship	B-Max Racing Team	20	0	0	0	0	11	8th
2018	Japanese Formula 3 Championship	B-Max Racing Team	19	0	0	0	0	1	12th
2019	Japanese Formula 3 Championship	ThreeBond Racing	13	0	0	0	0	0	NC
2020	Formula Regional Japanese Championship	Super License	4	0	0	0	1	39	11th
2020	Kyojo Cup	ALBA	4	1	3	1	4	80	1st
2020	Super Taikyu - ST-3	HELM Motorsports	1	0	0	0	1	44‡	5th‡
2021	Formula Regional Japanese Championship	Super License	13	1	1	1	7	179	2nd
2021	TCR Japan Touring Car Series - Saturday Series	Dome Racing	2	0	0	0	1	23	12th
2021	TCR Japan Touring Car Series - Sunday Series	Dome Racing	4	0	0	0	1	31	9th
2021	Super Taikyu - ST-Z	Hayashi Telempu SHADE Racing	6	0	0	2	0	42‡	8th‡
2022	Super Taikyu - ST-3	FKS Team Fukushima	4	0	1	1	3	76‡	4th‡
2022	Kyojo Cup	ALBA	2	0	0	0	1	22	6th
2023	Kyojo Cup	Team M	4	2	2	1	4	86	1st
2024	Super Taikyu - ST-3	Okabe Jidosha Motorsport	6	2	4	2	4	105‡	3rd‡
2024	TGR GR86/BRZ Cup	Okabe Jidosha Motorsport	2	0	0	0	0	0	NC
2024	F110 Cup	Team M	2	0	0	0	1	30	6th
2025	F4 Japanese Championship	Bionic Jack Racing	14	0	0	0	0	0	29th
2025	Formula Regional Japanese Championship	AiWin	2	0	0	0	0	22	13th
2026	Kyojo Cup	Team ReFa with AiWin	10	1	0	1	1	38	7th

‡ Team standings.
