= Ryuji Kumita =

Japanese racing driver

Ryuji Kumita "Dragon"
- Nationality: Japanese
- Born: 25 January 1967 (age 59) Yokohama, Kanagawa Prefecture

All-Japan Formula 3 Championship
- Categorisation: FIA Bronze
- Years active: 2013–2019
- Teams: B-Max Racing Team
- Starts: 110
- Wins: 0
- Poles: 0
- Fastest laps: 0
- Best finish: NC in 2013–18

Ryuji Kumita (born 25 January 1967 in Yokohama), better known by his pseudonym "Dragon", is a Japanese racing driver and team owner.

A late starter to motorsport at 46, Kumita mostly competes in Japanese junior formulae, such as the Super Formula Lights and Formula 4 Japan. He is the founder and CEO of B-Max Racing Team.

== Racing record ==
=== Career summary ===
Season	Series	Team	Races	Wins	Poles	F/Laps	Podiums	Points	Position
2006	Japan Le Mans Challenge - LMGT2	Proto Works	1	0	0	0	1	6	4th
2013	Japanese Formula 3 Championship	B-Max Engineering	15	0	0	0	0	0	15th
2014	Japanese Formula 3 Championship	B-Max Racing Team	15	0	0	0	0	0	15th
2014	Formula Masters China	Cebu Pacific Air by KCMG	1	0	0	0	0	0	26th
2015	Japanese Formula 3 Championship	B-Max Racing Team	17	0	0	0	0	0	16th
2016	Japanese Formula 3 Championship	B-Max Racing Team	17	0	0	0	0	0	15th
2016	F4 Japanese Championship	RSS	11	0	0	0	0	0	30th
2017	Japanese Formula 3 Championship	B-Max Racing Team	20	0	0	0	0	0	12th
2017	FRD LMP3 Series	B-Max Racing Team							
2017	Macau Grand Prix	B-Max Racing Team	0	0	0	0	0	N/A	DNQ
2017	F4 Japanese Championship	Buzz International	2	0	0	0	0	0	43rd
2018	Japanese Formula 3 Championship	B-Max Engineering	19	0	0	0	0	0	17th
2018	F4 Japanese Championship	B-Max Engineering	2	0	0	0	0	0	NC
2018	F3 Asian Championship	B-Max Racing Team	9	0	0	0	0	0	23rd
2018	Macau Grand Prix	B-Max Racing Team	2	0	0	0	0	N/A	20th
2018	Super Taikyu - ST-TCR	B-Max Engineering with Dome	3	0	0	0	0	4‡	9th‡
2018	Super Taikyu - ST-TCR	DOME RACING PROJECT	1	0	0	0	0	117‡	**2nd‡**
2019	Japanese Formula 3 Championship	B-Max Racing with Motopark	20	0	0	0	0	0	14th
2019	F3 Asian Championship	B-Max Racing Team	3	0	0	0	0	0	21st
2019	F3 Asian Winter Series	B-Max Racing Team	3	0	0	0	0	0	16th
2019	F4 Japanese Championship	B-Max Engineering	12	0	0	0	0	0	22nd
2020	Super Formula Lights	B-Max Racing	17	0	0	0	0	2	12th
2020	Formula Regional Japanese Championship	B-MAX	11	0	0	0	0	76	6th
2021	Super Formula Lights	B-Max Engineering	17	0	0	0	0	0	12th
2021	Formula Regional Japanese Championship	B-Max Engineering	10	0	0	0	0	20	18th
2021	Super Taikyu - ST-Z	B-Max Engineering	3	0	0	0	0	14‡	13th‡
2021	F4 Japanese Championship	Zap Speed	12	0	0	0	0	0	26th
2022	Super Formula Lights	B-Max Racing Team	18	0	0	0	0	1	11th
2022	F4 Japanese Championship	B-Max Racing Team	14	0	0	0	0	0	35th
2023	Super Formula Lights	B-Max Racing Team	18	0	0	0	0	0	13th
2023	F4 Japanese Championship	B-Max Racing Team	12	0	0	0	0	0	40th
2023	Formula 4 South East Asia Championship	B-Max Racing Team	5	0	0	0	0	2	27th
2023	Macau Formula 4 Race	B-Max Racing Team	2	0	0	0	0	N/A	13th
2024	Super Formula Lights	Team Dragon	18	0	0	0	0	0	11th
2024	F4 Japanese Championship - Independent	B-Max Racing Team	13	5	5	4	9	202	**1st**
2024	Super Taikyu - ST-X	Team Handwork Challenge							
2025	Super Formula Lights	B-Max Racing Team	18	0	0	0	0	0	18th
2025	F4 Japanese Championship - Independent	B-Max Racing Team	14	4	4	3	9	190.5	**3rd**
2026	Super Formula Lights	B-Max Engineering	18	0	0	0	0	0	13th
2026	F4 Japanese Championship - Independent	B-Max Racing Team	11	0	0	0	1	80	5th

‡ Team standings.

=== Complete Macau Grand Prix results ===
Year	Team	Car	Qualifying	Quali Race	Main race
2017	(Japan) B-Max Racing Team	Dallara F317	NC	DNQ	DNQ
2018	(Japan) B-Max Racing Team	Dallara F317	28th	23rd	20th

=== Complete Formula Regional Japanese Championship results ===
(key) (Races in bold indicate pole position) (Races in italics indicate fastest lap)

Year	Entrant	1	2	3	4	5	6	7	8	9	10	11	12	13	14	Pos	Points
2020	B-MAX	FUJ1; 1 DNS	FUJ1; 2; 7	FUJ1; 3; 8	SUG; 1; 6	SUG; 2; 5	SUG; 3; 5	FUJ2; 1; 6	FUJ2; 2; 7	MOT; 1; 6	MOT; 2 Ret	OKA; 1; 7	OKA; 2; 5	AUT; 1	AUT; 2	6th	76
2021	B-Max Engineering	OKA; 1 Ret	OKA; 2 Ret	OKA; 3; 6	MOT; 1	MOT; 2	MOT; 3	FUJ; 1; 7	FUJ; 2 Ret	FUJ; 3 Ret	SUG; 1; 8	SUG; 2; 12	SUZ; 1 Ret	SUZ; 2; 9		18th	20

=== Complete Super Formula Lights results ===
(key) (Races in bold indicate pole position) (Races in italics indicate fastest lap)

Year	Entrant	1	2	3	4	5	6	7	8	9	10	11	12	13	14	15	16	17	18	Pos	Points
2020	B-Max Racing	MOT; 1; 10	MOT; 2 Ret	MOT; 3; 10	OKA; 1; 10	OKA; 2; 7	SUG; 1; 5	SUG; 2; 7	SUG; 3; 7	AUT; 1; 8	AUT; 2; 8	AUT; 3; 8	SUZ; 1; 9	SUZ; 2; 7	SUZ; 3; 8	FUJ; 1; 9	FUJ; 2; 11	FUJ; 3; 9		12th	2
2021	B-Max Engineering	FUJ; 1; 9	FUJ; 2; 9	FUJ; 3; 8	SUZ; 1; 11	SUZ; 2; 8	SUZ; 3; 9	AUT; 1; 8	AUT; 2; 7	AUT; 3 C	SUG; 1 Ret	SUG; 2; 8	SUG; 3; 9	MOT1; 1; 8	MOT1; 2; 8	MOT1; 3; 8	MOT2; 1; 10	MOT2; 2; 7	MOT2; 3; 11	12th	0
2022	B-Max Racing Team	FUJ; 1 Ret	FUJ; 2; 11	FUJ; 3; 11	SUZ; 1; 12	SUZ; 2; 10	SUZ; 3; 11	AUT; 1; 12	AUT; 2; 7	AUT; 3; 12	SUG; 1; 7	SUG; 2; 11	SUG; 3; 10	MOT; 1; 6	MOT; 2; 8	MOT; 3 Ret	OKA; 1; 11	OKA; 2 Ret	OKA; 3; 10	11th	1
2023	B-Max Racing Team	AUT; 1; 10	AUT; 2; 9	AUT; 3; 9	SUG; 1; 9	SUG; 2; 11	SUG; 3; 9	SUZ; 1; 10	SUZ; 2; 12	SUZ; 3; 12	FUJ; 1; 11	FUJ; 2; 9	FUJ; 3; 12	OKA; 1; 9	OKA; 2; 8	OKA; 3; 9	MOT; 1; 11	MOT; 2; 10	MOT; 3; 11	13th	0
2024	Team Dragon	AUT; 1; 9	AUT; 2; 10	AUT; 3; 10	SUG; 1; 9	SUG; 2; 9	SUG; 3; 9	FUJ; 1; 10	FUJ; 2; 10	FUJ; 3; 8	OKA; 1; 10	OKA; 2; 8	OKA; 3; 10	SUZ; 1; 10	SUZ; 2; 9	SUZ; 3; 11	MOT; 1; 11	MOT; 2; 12	MOT; 3; 11	11th	0
2025	B-Max Racing Team	SUZ; 1; 13	SUZ; 2 Ret	SUZ; 3; 13	AUT; 1; 14	AUT; 2; 12	OKA; 1; 13	OKA; 2; 12	OKA; 3; 12	SUG; 1; 13	SUG; 2; 10	SUG; 3; 12	SUG; 4; 13	FUJ; 1; 10	FUJ; 2; 12	FUJ; 3; 12	MOT; 1; 13	MOT; 2 Ret	MOT; 3; 11	18th	0
2026	B-Max Engineering	FUJ; 1; 13	FUJ; 2; 12	FUJ; 3; 12	AUT; 1; 13	AUT; 2; 10	AUT; 3; 12	SUZ; 1; 11	SUZ; 2; 12	SUZ; 3; 9	OKA; 1; 10	OKA; 2; 9	OKA; 3; 8	SUG; 1; 12	SUG; 2; 12	SUG; 3; 10	MOT; 1; 14	MOT; 2; 10	MOT; 3; 14	13th	0

=== Complete Formula 4 South East Asia Championship results ===
(key) (Races in bold indicate pole position; races in italics indicate fastest lap)

Year	Entrant	1	2	3	4	5	6	7	8	9	10	11	Pos	Points
2023	B-Max Racing Team	ZZIC1; 1	ZZIC1; 2	ZZIC1; 3	MAC; 1; 18	MAC; 2; 13	SEP1; 1	SEP1; 2	SEP1; 3	SEP2; 1; 14	SEP2; 2; 10	SEP2; 3; 10	27th	2
