= Sena Sakaguchi =

Japanese racing driver

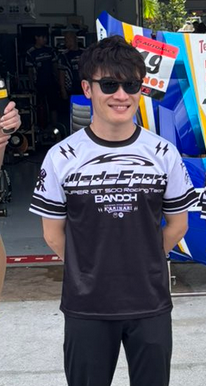
- Sakaguchi at the 2025 Super GT Malaysia Festival
- Nationality: (Japan) Japanese
- Born: 9 July 1999 (age 27) Habikino, Osaka, Japan
- Relatives: Ryohei Sakaguchi (uncle)

Super GT - GT500 career
- Debut season: 2020
- Current team: TGR Team WedsSport Bandoh
- Car number: 19
- Former teams: SARD, TOM'S
- Starts: 38
- Wins: 1
- Podiums: 4
- Poles: 7
- Fastest laps: 0
- Best finish: 11th in 2022

Super Formula Championship career
- Debut season: 2018
- Current team: Cerumo・INGING
- Car number: 38
- Former teams: Kondō Racing, Team Mugen
- Starts: 47
- Wins: 0
- Podiums: 2
- Poles: 1
- Fastest laps: 0
- Best finish: 7th in 2021

Previous series
- 2020 2020 2019-2021 2016-19 2015-16: Formula Regional Japanese Championship; Super Formula Lights; Super GT - GT300; Japanese Formula 3 Championship; F4 Japanese Championship

Championship titles
- 2020: Formula Regional Japanese Championship

Sena Sakaguchi (阪口晴南, Sakaguchi Sena; born 9 July 1999) is a Japanese racing driver for Toyota Gazoo Racing who is currently competing in Super GT for Racing Project Bandoh and in Super Formula for Cerumo・INGING. He is the champion of the 2020 Formula Regional Japanese Championship.

== Career ==
=== Early career ===
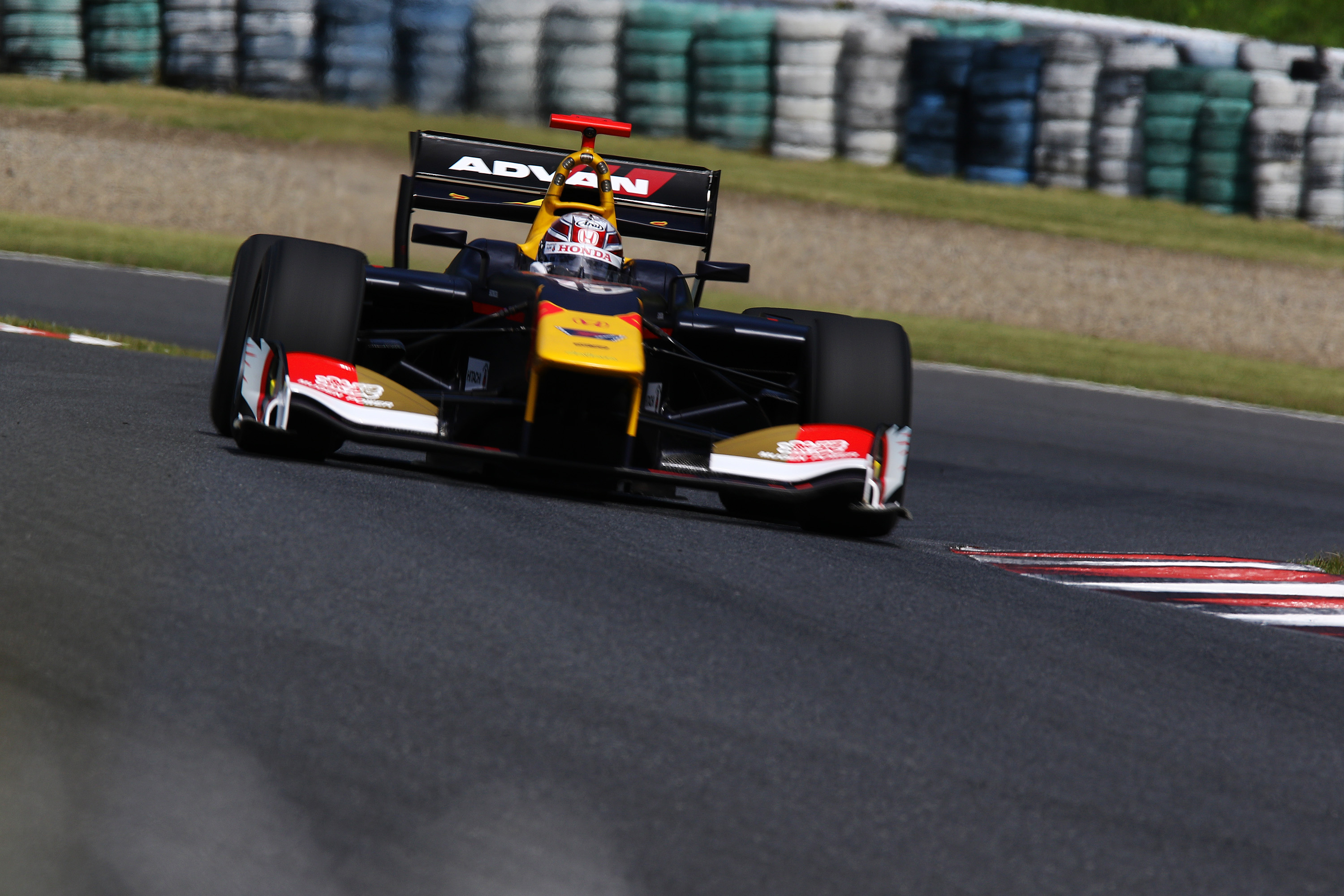
Sakaguchi competing in the Super Formula Championship in 2018

Sakaguchi began his senior competition career in 2015, competing for Sutekina Racing Team in the final four rounds of the F4 Japanese Championship. Through eight races that season, he registered a podium at Motegi and finished outside of the points just once, taking 10th in the championship. The following season, he graduated to the Japanese F3 Championship, taking part thanks to the Honda Formula Dream Project. Sakaguchi continued competing in F4 during 2016, tallying his first win in the series at Motegi en route to a second-place point finish. In his maiden F3 season, Sakaguchi would finish 9th in points.

Sakaguchi returned to F3 in 2017 with Honda support, finishing an improved 6th in points, netting his first podium in the series at the penultimate race at Sugo. In 2018, Sakaguchi joined Toda Racing and built upon his previous results, finishing fourth in points off the back of five podium finishes in 17 races. Following the 2018 season, Sakaguchi was released from his junior driver role at Honda.

Sakaguchi raced in F3 2019 season tallying three podiums in five races driving for TOM'S. Following the Japanese F3 split at the end of 2019, Sakaguchi competed in both of the resulting series during 2020. In the Super Formula Lights series, Sakaguchi ran the full season with B-Max Racing. Despite finishing just one race outside of the podium positions, he would finish second in the standings, nearly 40 points behind Ritomo Miyata. In the K2 Planet-promoted Formula Regional Japanese Championship, however, Sakaguchi won all eleven races that he competed in, taking the championship by just over 50 points despite missing the triple-header at Sugo.

=== Super Formula ===
Sakaguchi would have been his debut in the Super Formula Championship with Team Mugen, filling in for Nirei Fukuzumi, who was competing in the F2 Championship that weekend. However, the race was canceled due to inclement weather. Later, in 2020, he filled in for Kondo Racing's Kenta Yamashita during the Super Formula Championship round at Okayama. However, Sakaguchi once again was unable to make it to the grid, crashing on the warm-up lap and failing to officially register his Super Formula debut.

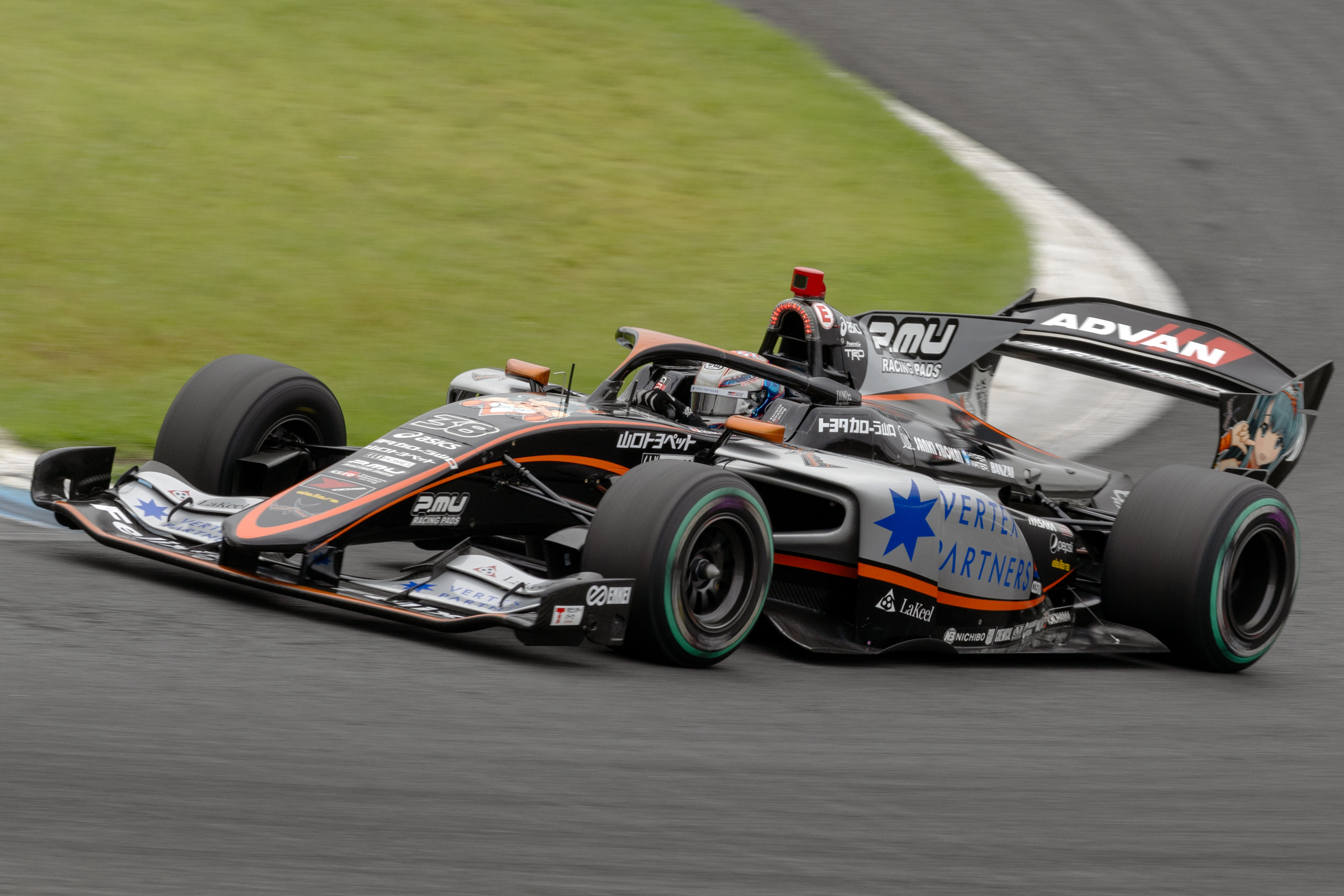
Sakaguchi car at Motegi Super Formula 2024

For 2021, Sakaguchi secured a full-time ride in Super Formula with P.mu/cerumo・INGING, replacing retiring two-time series champion Hiroaki Ishiura. In his rookie season, Sakaguchi claimed two podium finishes en route to a seventh-place points finish, taking second at the rain-shortened round at Autopolis and the second event at Motegi. Sakaguchi endured a quiet 2023 season in Super Formula, finishing a season-high fifth at Motegi.

=== Super GT ===
==== GT300 ====
2019 marked Sakaguchi's first experience with sports car racing, as he joined K-Tunes Racing for the 2019 Super GT Series season, competing alongside veteran Morio Nitta in the GT300 class. The drive came about thanks to Sakaguchi's uncle, Ryōhei Sakaguchi a racing driver who was competing in the series and had connections with the K-Tunes team. Sakaguchi and Nitta would take two class victories that season; the rain-shortened season-opener at Okayama and Round 3 at Suzuka, finishing second in points. Sakaguchi would return to K-tunes Racing for the last three rounds in 2021 after competed mostly in GT500.

==== GT300 ====
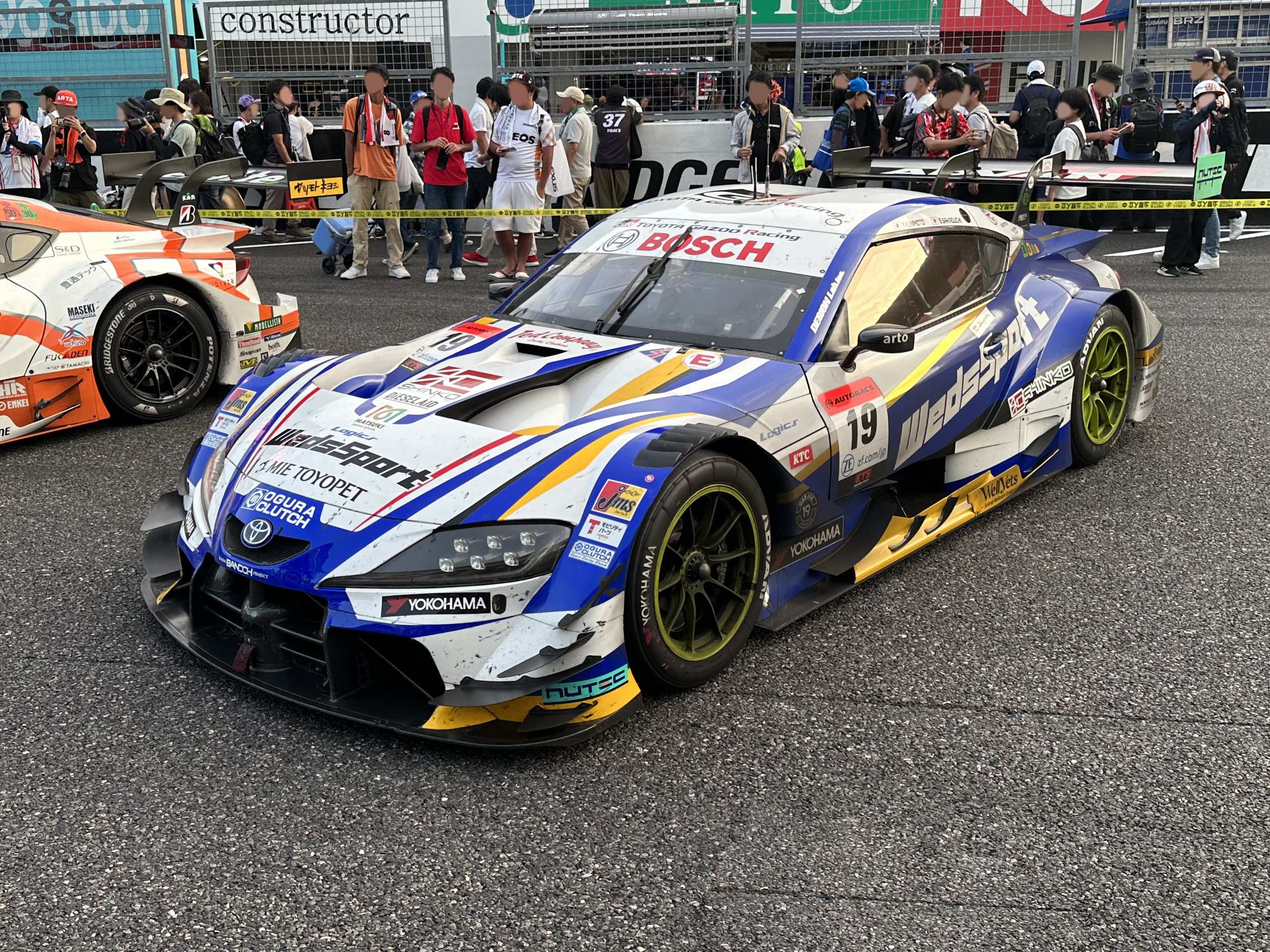
Sakaguchi's GT500-class Toyota GR Supra in 2023.

During 2020, Sakaguchi also played the role of substitute on two occasions, initially replacing Heikki Kovalainen in TGR Team SARD's GT500 class entry at Fuji in July. For 2021, visa issues for Frenchman Sacha Fenestraz enabled Sakaguchi to add a part-time campaign in the GT500 class of the Super GT series. He would pair with Ryo Hirakawa for the first five rounds of the season, taking pole at the opening round alongside two podium finishes.

Ahead of 2022, Sakaguchi moved to the GT500 class full-time, pairing with Yuji Kunimoto in the #19 TGR Team WedsSport Bandoh entry. Despite Sakaguchi himself claiming three individual poles and the entry scoring four total, the team would only finish 11th in the championship, finishing no higher than fifth in any given race. At the conclusion of the season, sports car racing publication Sportscar365 named Sakaguchi as an honorable mention for their GT500 Driver of the Year. Sakaguchi would return to the team in 2023, paired once again with Kunimoto. The duo would claim the first GT500-class victory for Bandoh since 2016 in a red-flag shortened event at Suzuka, concluding the season 12th in the overall championship.

== Racing record ==
=== Career summary ===
Season	Series	Team	Races	Wins	Poles	F/Laps	Podiums	Points	Position
2015	F4 Japanese Championship	Sutekina Racing Team	8	0	0	1	1	41	10th
2015	Super-FJ Okayama Series	Drago Corse Toda Power	1	1	1	1	1	20	6th
2015	Super-FJ - Japan Finals	Nakanihon Automotive College Toda Wako's	1	1	1	1	1	N/A	**1st**
2016	F4 Japanese Championship	Honda Formula Dream Project	13	1	0	2	7	138	**2nd**
2016	Japanese Formula 3 Championship	Honda Formula Dream Project	17	0	0	0	1	20	9th
2017	Japanese Formula 3 Championship	Honda Formula Dream Project	20	0	0	0	1	27	6th
2018	Japanese Formula 3 Championship	Toda Racing	19	0	0	0	5	52	4th
2018	Macau Grand Prix	Toda Racing	2	0	0	0	0	0	18th
2018	Super Formula	Team Mugen	0	0	0	0	0	0	NC
2019	Super GT - GT300	K-tunes Racing	8	2	0	1	4	58	**2nd**
2019	Japanese Formula 3 Championship	Corolla Chukyo Kuo TOM'S	5	0	0	0	3	20	8th
2020	Formula Regional Japanese Championship	Sutekina Racing Team	11	11	8	8	11	275	**1st**
2020	Super Formula Lights	B-Max Racing	17	4	5	2	16	116	**2nd**
2020	Super GT - GT300	K-tunes Racing	7	0	1	0	0	15	16th
2020	Super GT - GT500	TGR Team SARD	1	0	0	0	0	5	18th
2020	Super Formula	Kondō Racing	0	0	0	0	0	0	NC
2020	Super Taikyū - ST-1	ADVICS Muta Racing	2	0	0	0	2	50‡	**2nd‡**
2021	Super Formula	P.mu/cerumo・INGING	7	0	0	0	2	35.5	7th
2021	Super GT - GT500	TGR Team KeePer TOM'S	5	0	1	1	2	28	14th
2021	Super GT - GT300	K-tunes Racing	3	0	0	0	1	15	16th
2021	Super Taikyū - ST-1	Tracy Sports	2	0	0	0	2	124‡	**2nd‡**
2022	Super GT - GT500	TGR Team WedsSport Bandoh	8	0	4	0	0	28.5	11th
2022	Super Formula	P.mu/cerumo・INGING	10	0	0	0	0	6	18th
2022	Super Taikyu - ST-3	Tracy Sports	1	0	0	0	1	99‡	**3rd‡**
2023	Super GT - GT500	TGR Team WedsSport Bandoh	8	1	0	0	1	30	12th
2023	Super Formula	P.mu/cerumo・INGING	9	0	0	0	0	15	12th
2024	Super Formula	Vertex Partners Cerumo・INGING	9	0	1	0	0	20	12th
2024	Super GT - GT500	TGR Team WedsSport Bandoh	8	0	0	0	0	6	15th
2025	Super Formula	Sanki Vertex Partners Cerumo・INGING	12	0	0	0	0	38	10th
2025	Super GT - GT500	TGR Team WedsSport Bandoh	8	0	2	1	0	18.5	15th
2025	Super Taikyu - ST-USA-1	Bingo Racing	1	0	1	0	0	2‡	**2nd‡**
2025	Super Taikyu - ST-X	apr	1	0	0	0	0	114‡	**3rd‡**
2026	Super Formula	Sanki Vertex Partners Cerumo・INGING							
2026	Super GT - GT500	TGR Team WedsSport Bandoh	8	0	0	0	0	9	15th
2026	SRO Japan Cup - GT3	K-tunes Racing	2	0	0	0	0	12	13th
2026	Super Taikyu - ST-X	apr							

^{*} Season still in progress.
‡ Team standings

=== Complete F4 Japanese Championship results ===
(key) (Races in bold indicate pole position) (Races in italics indicate fastest lap)

Year	Team	1	2	3	4	5	6	7	8	9	10	11	12	13	14	DC	Pts
2015	Honda Formula Dream Project	OKA; 1	OKA; 2	FUJ1; 1	FUJ1; 2	FUJ2; 1	FUJ2; 2	SUZ; 1; 30†	SUZ; 2; 6	SUG; 1; 7	SUG; 2; 8	AUT; 1; 5	AUT; 2; 7	MOT; 1; 3	MOT; 2; 7	10th	41
2016	Honda Formula Dream Project	OKA; 1; 2	OKA; 2 Ret	FUJ1; 1; 3	FUJ1; 2; 4	SUG; 1 Ret	SUG; 2; 9	FUJ2; 1; 3	FUJ2; 2; 2	FUJ2; 3; 3	SUZ; 1; 24	SUZ; 2; 2	MOT; 1 Ret	MOT; 2; 1	MOT; 3; 15	2nd	138

=== Complete Japanese Formula 3 results ===
Year	Team	Engine	1	2	3	4	5	6	7	8	9	10	11	12	13	14	15	16	17	18	19	20	21	DC	Pts
2016	Honda Formula Dream Project	Mugen Honda	SUZ; 1; 9	SUZ; 2; 7	FUJ; 1; 8	FUJ; 2; 7	OKA; 1; 6	OKA; 2; 4	SUZ; 1; 7	SUZ; 2; 7	FUJ; 1; 5	FUJ; 2; 8	MOT; 1; 6	MOT; 2; 6	OKA; 1; 6	OKA; 2; 2	SUG; 1; 7	SUG; 2; 5	SUG; 3; 5					9th	20
2017	Honda Formula Dream Project	Toda	OKA; 1; 6	OKA; 2; 5	OKA; 3; 7	SUZ; 1; 4	SUZ; 2; 4	FUJ; 1; 4	FUJ; 2 Ret	OKA; 1; 6	OKA; 2; 9	SUZ; 1; 7	SUZ; 2; 16	FUJ; 1; 4	FUJ; 2; 6	MOT; 1; 7	MOT; 2; 6	MOT; 3; 6	AUT; 1; 5	AUT; 2; 6	SUG; 1; 3	SUG; 2; 9		6th	27
2018	Toda Racing	Toda	SUZ; 1; 3	SUZ; 2; 3	SUG; 1; 4	SUG; 2; 3	FUJ; 1; 2	FUJ; 2; 4	OKA; 1; 6	OKA; 2; 4	OKA; 3 C	MOT; 1; 5	MOT; 2; 5	MOT; 3; 9	OKA; 1 Ret	OKA; 2; 4	OKA; 3 C	SUG; 1; 8	SUG; 2; 5	SUG; 3 Ret	SUG; 4; 4	FUJ; 1; 2	FUJ; 2; 6	4th	52
2019	Corolla Chukyo Kuo TOM'S	Toyota TOM'S	SUZ; 1	SUZ; 2	AUT; 1	AUT; 2	AUT; 3	OKA; 1; 5	OKA; 2; 3	OKA; 3; 4	SUG; 1	SUG; 2	FUJ; 1	FUJ; 2	SUG; 1	SUG; 2	SUG; 3	MOT; 1	MOT; 2	MOT; 3	OKA; 1; 3	OKA; 2; 3		8th	20

=== Complete Formula Regional Japanese Championship results ===
(key) (Races in bold indicate pole position) (Races in italics indicate fastest lap)

Year	Entrant	1	2	3	4	5	6	7	8	9	10	11	12	13	14	Pos	Points
2020	Sutekina Racing Team	**FUJ1**; **1**; 1	**FUJ1**; **2**; 1	**FUJ1**; **3**; 1	SUG; 1	SUG; 2	SUG; 3	**FUJ2**; **1**; 1	**FUJ2**; **2**; 1	**MOT**; **1**; 1	**MOT**; **2**; 1	**OKA**; **1**; 1	**OKA**; **2**; 1	AUT; 1; 1	AUT; 2; 1	1st	275

=== Complete Super Formula Lights results ===
Year	Team	1	2	3	4	5	6	7	8	9	10	11	12	13	14	15	16	17	DC	Pts
2020	B-Max Racing Team	MOT; 1; 2	MOT; 2; 3	MOT; 3; 2	OKA; 1; 2	OKA; 2; 1	**SUG**; **1**; 2	**SUG**; **2**; 1	SUG; 3; 2	AUT; 1; 2	AUT; 2; 1	AUT; 3; 2	**SUZ**; **1**; 8	**SUZ**; **2**; 1	SUZ; 3; 2	FUJ; 1; 2	**FUJ**; **2**; 2	FUJ; 3; 2	2nd	116

=== Complete Super Formula results ===
(key) (Races in bold indicate pole position) (Races in italics indicate fastest lap)

Year	Team	Engine	1	2	3	4	5	6	7	8	9	10	11	12	DC	Points
2018	Team Mugen	Honda	SUZ	AUT; C	SUG	FUJ	MOT	OKA	SUZ						NC	0
2020	Kondō Racing	Toyota	MOT	OKA; DNS	SUG	AUT	SUZ	SUZ	FUJ						NC	0
2021	P.mu cerumo・INGING	Toyota	FUJ; 9	SUZ; 11	AUT; 2‡^{3}	SUG; 8^{3}	MOT; 5	MOT; 2	SUZ; 13						7th	35.5
2022	P.mu cerumo・INGING	Toyota	FUJ; 12	FUJ; 17	SUZ; 12	AUT; 8	SUG; 19	FUJ; 12	MOT; 16	MOT; 9	SUZ; 10	SUZ; 14			18th	6
2023	P.mu cerumo・INGING	Toyota	FUJ; 17	FUJ; 10	SUZ; 6	AUT; Ret^{3}	SUG; 10	FUJ; 10	MOT; 5	SUZ; 14	SUZ; 11				12th	15
2024	Vertex Partners Cerumo・INGING	Toyota	**SUZ**; 7^{1}	AUT; 6	SUG; 12	FUJ; Ret	MOT; Ret	FUJ; 18	FUJ; Ret	SUZ; 4	SUZ; 13				12th	20
2025	Sanki Vertex Partners Cerumo・INGING	Toyota	SUZ; 6	SUZ; 15	MOT; 6	MOT; 5	AUT; 5	FUJ; 7	FUJ; 11	SUG; 5^{3}	FUJ; 9	SUZ; 14	SUZ; 11	SUZ; 7	10th	38
2026	Sanki Vertex Partners Cerumo・INGING	Toyota	MOT	MOT	AUT	SUZ	SUZ	FUJ	FUJ	SUG	FUJ	FUJ	SUZ	SUZ		

^{*} Season still in progress.

=== Complete Super GT results ===
Year	Team	Car	Class	1	2	3	4	5	6	7	8	9	DC	Points
2019	K-tunes Racing	Lexus RC F GT3	GT300	OKA; 1	FUJ; 16	SUZ; 1	BUR; 14	FUJ; 15	AUT; 5	SUG; 3	MOT; 3		2nd	58
2020	K-tunes Racing	Lexus RC F GT3	GT300	FUJ; 11		SUZ; 28	MOT; 4	FUJ; 26	**SUZ**; 5	MOT; 17	FUJ; 22		16th	15
2020	TGR Team SARD	Toyota GR Supra GT500	GT500		FUJ; 6								18th	5
2021	TGR Team KeePer TOM'S	Toyota GR Supra GT500	GT500	**OKA**; 3	FUJ; 3	MOT; 7	SUZ; 10	SUG; 11					14th	28
2021	K-tunes Racing	Lexus RC F GT3	GT300						AUT; 2	MOT; 14	FUJ; 19		16th	15
2022	TGR Team WedsSport Bandoh	Toyota GR Supra GT500	GT500	OKA; 13	**FUJ**; 6	**SUZ**; 5	**FUJ**; 9	SUZ; 7	**SUG**; 15	AUT; 5	MOT; 7		11th	28.5
2023	TGR Team WedsSport Bandoh	Toyota GR Supra GT500	GT500	OKA; 9	FUJ; 12	SUZ; 1	FUJ; 12	SUZ; 9	SUG; 8	AUT; 13	MOT; 8		12th	30
2024	TGR Team WedsSport Bandoh	Toyota GR Supra GT500	GT500	OKA; 13	FUJ; 10	SUZ; 12	FUJ; 9	SUZ; 8^{3}	SUG; Ret	AUT; 12	MOT; 14		15th	6
2025	TGR Team WedsSport BANDOH	Toyota GR Supra GT500	GT500	OKA; 12†	FUJ; 14	**SEP**; 5	**FS1**; 4	FS2 (15)	SUZ; 14	SUG; 10	AUT; 5	MOT; 11	15th	18.5
2026	TGR Team WedsSport BANDOH	Toyota GR Supra GT500	GT500	OKA; 12	FUJ; 10	FUJ; 10	SUZ; 13	SUG; 6	AUT; 10	MOT; 12	MOT; 10		15th	9

^{‡} Half points awarded as less than 75% of race distance was completed.
^{(Number)} Driver did not take part in this sprint race, points are still awarded for the teammate's result.
^{*} Season still in progress.

Sporting positions
Preceded by Series Founded	Formula Regional Japanese Championship; Champion; 2020	Succeeded by Yuga Furutani
