= 2021 Formula Regional Japanese Championship =

Motor racing competition

The 2021 Formula Regional Japanese Championship was a multi-event, Formula 3 open-wheel single seater motor racing championship held in Japan. The drivers competed in Formula Regional cars that conform to the FIA Formula Regional regulations for the championship. This was the second season of the championship, now promoted by New Pacific Sports Marketing Inc., and the 43rd overall season of an FIA ladder series (dating to the 1979 Japanese Formula 3 Championship).

The season started on 26 June and concluded on 12 December. Yuga Furutani took the drivers' title ahead of Ai Miura, while his team TOM'S Youth won the teams' title and Takashi Hata earned Masters' class honors.

== Teams and drivers ==
All teams and drivers competed using the Dome F111/3 Regional F3 car. All teams were Japanese-registered.

Team	No.	Driver	Status	Rounds
Sutekina Racing Team	1	(Republic of Ireland) Lucca Allen		1
Sutekina Racing Team	3	(Japan) Sota Ogawa		3–5
Sutekina Racing Team	5	(Japan) Yusuke Shiotsu		3–5
B-Max Engineering	4	(Japan) Nobuhiro Imada	M	3–5
B-Max Engineering	27	(Japan) Nobuhiro Imada	M	1
B-Max Engineering	27	(Japan) "Syuji"	M	2–3, 5
B-Max Engineering	30	(Japan) "Dragon"	M	1, 3–5
B-Max Engineering	96	(Japan) "Takumi"	M	All
Super License	7	(Japan) Takashi Hata	M	All
Super License	8	(Japan) Ai Miura		All
Super License	9	(Japan) Tomoki Takahashi		5
Rn-sports	11	(Japan) Masayuki Ueda	M	1–3, 5
Rn-sports	11	(Japan) Kakunoshin Ohta		4
RaiseUPMotorSport	22	(Japan) Takashi Itou		1
N-Speed	23	(Japan) "Yugo"	M	2–3
TOM'S Youth	28	(Japan) Yuga Furutani		All
CMS motor sports project	34	(Japan) Masaru Miura	M	All
Eagle Sports	39	(Japan) Yuki Tanaka	M	All
PONOS Racing	45	(Japan) Yorikatsu Tsujiko		1, 3
PONOS Racing	45	(Japan) Riki Okusa		2, 4–5
D'station Racing	77	(Japan) Ryunosuke Sawa		3–4
Zap Speed	86	(Japan) Hachiro Osaka	M	3
Privateer	6	(Japan) Yoshiaki Katayama		1
Privateer	87	(Japan) Yusuke Shiotsu		1

Icon	Class
M	Masters' Cup.

== Race calendar ==
The first calendar for 2021 was announced on 30 October 2020. For the first time, the series was planned to be on the Formula One support bill, at the 2021 Japanese Grand Prix. After the changes in the calendar, it was to support FIA World Endurance Championship at 2021 6 Hours of Fuji instead, before that race was cancelled. The round at Sugo was moved to 9 October later on.

Round		Circuit	Date	Pole position	Fastest lap	Winning driver	Winning team	Masters winner
1	R1	Okayama International Circuit	26 June	(Japan) Yusuke Shiotsu	(Japan) Yoshiaki Katayama	(Japan) Yoshiaki Katayama	Privateer	(Japan) Yuki Tanaka
1	R2	Okayama International Circuit	27 June	(Japan) Yoshiaki Katayama	(Japan) Yoshiaki Katayama	(Japan) Yoshiaki Katayama	Privateer	(Japan) Yuki Tanaka
1	R3	Okayama International Circuit	27 June	(Japan) Yoshiaki Katayama	(Japan) Yuga Furutani	(Japan) Yoshiaki Katayama	Privateer	(Japan) "Dragon"
2	R4	Twin Ring Motegi	4 September	(Japan) Riki Okusa	(Japan) Riki Okusa	(Japan) Riki Okusa	PONOS Racing	(Japan) Takashi Hata
2	R5	Twin Ring Motegi	5 September	(Japan) Yuga Furutani	(Japan) Yuga Furutani	(Japan) Yuga Furutani	TOM'S Youth	(Japan) Masaru Miura
2	R6	Twin Ring Motegi	5 September	(Japan) Riki Okusa	(Japan) Yuga Furutani	(Japan) Riki Okusa	PONOS Racing	(Japan) Masaru Miura
3	R7	Fuji Speedway	25 September	(Japan) Yuga Furutani	(Japan) Yuga Furutani	(Japan) Yuga Furutani	TOM'S Youth	(Japan) Nobuhiro Imada
3	R8	Fuji Speedway	25 September	(Japan) Yuga Furutani	(Japan) Yuga Furutani	(Japan) Ai Miura	Super License	(Japan) Nobuhiro Imada
3	R9	Fuji Speedway	26 September	(Japan) Ai Miura	(Japan) Yuga Furutani	(Japan) Ryunosuke Sawa	D'station Racing	(Japan) Yuki Tanaka
4	R10	Sportsland Sugo	9 October	(Japan) Ryunosuke Sawa	(Japan) Ai Miura	(Japan) Yuga Furutani	TOM'S Youth	(Japan) Takashi Hata
4	R11	Sportsland Sugo	9 October	(Japan) Ryunosuke Sawa	(Japan) Riki Okusa	(Japan) Ryunosuke Sawa	D'station Racing	(Japan) Takashi Hata
5	R12	Suzuka International Racing Course	12 December	(Japan) Riki Okusa	(Japan) Sota Ogawa	(Japan) Sota Ogawa	Sutekina Racing Team	(Japan) Nobuhiro Imada
5	R13	Suzuka International Racing Course	12 December	(Japan) Riki Okusa	(Japan) Yuga Furutani	(Japan) Yuga Furutani	TOM'S Youth	(Japan) Nobuhiro Imada

== Championship standings ==
=== Scoring system ===
Points were awarded to the top ten drivers.

Position	1st	2nd	3rd	4th	5th	6th	7th	8th	9th	10th
Points	25	18	15	12	10	8	6	4	2	1

=== Drivers' championship ===
Pos	Driver	OKA			MOT			FUJ			SUG		SUZ		Pts
Pos	Driver	R1	R2	R3	R4	R5	R6	R7	R8	R9	R10	R11	R12	R13	Pts
1	(Japan) Yuga Furutani	2	2	2	2	1	2	1	4	2	1	5	5	1	240
2	(Japan) Ai Miura	4	3	4	3	3	3	3	1	3	5	4	6	5	179
3	(Japan) Riki Okusa				1	2	1				2	2	2	2	140
4	(Japan) Yusuke Shiotsu	3	5	3				4	3	4	13	8	4	3	110
5	(Japan) Ryunosuke Sawa							2	10	1	3	1			84
6	(Japan) Yoshiaki Katayama	1	1	1											75
7	(Japan) Sota Ogawa							9	2	5	12	7	1	4	73
8	(Japan) Takashi Hata	12	9	11	4	7	6	12	8	10	6	6	8	8	57
9	(Japan) Yuki Tanaka	7	6	Ret	7	Ret	5	6	6	6	10	11	11	Ret	55
10	(Japan) Nobuhiro Imada	8	8	7				5	5	13	7	9	7	7	54
11	(Japan) "Takumi"	9	7	8	8	6	7	10	9	7	9	10	9	Ret	44
12	(Japan) Masaru Miura	11	10	9	6	4	4	11	15	8	11	13	10	10	41
13	(Japan) Masayuki Ueda	10	11	12	5	5	9	8	7	9			Ret	12	35
14	(Japan) Kakunoshin Ohta										4	3			27
15	(Japan) Tomoki Takahashi												3	6	23
16	(Republic of Ireland) Lucca Allen	6	4	10											21
17	(Japan) Takashi Itou	5	Ret	5											20
18	(Japan) "Dragon"	Ret	Ret	6				7	Ret	Ret	8	12	Ret	9	20
19	(Japan) "Syuji"				9	8	8	15	11	11			12	11	10
20	(Japan) "Yugo"				Ret	9	10	13	13	Ret					3
21	(Japan) Yorikatsu Tsujiko	13	12	13				14	14	12					0
22	(Japan) Hachiro Osaka							Ret	12	Ret					0
Pos	Driver	R1	R2	R3	R4	R5	R6	R7	R8	R9	R10	R11	R12	R13	Pts
Pos	Driver	OKA			MOT			FUJ			SUG		SUZ		Pts

=== Masters class ===
Pos	Driver	OKA			MOT			FUJ			SUG		SUZ		Pts
Pos	Driver	R1	R2	R3	R4	R5	R6	R7	R8	R9	R10	R11	R12	R13	Pts
1	(Japan) Takashi Hata	6	4	5	1	4	3	7	4	5	1	1	2	2	196
2	(Japan) Nobuhiro Imada	2	3	2				1	1	7	2	2	1	1	193
3	(Japan) Yuki Tanaka	1	1	Ret	4	Ret	2	2	2	1	5	4	5	Ret	173
4	(Japan) "Takumi"	3	2	3	5	3	4	5	5	2	4	3	3	Ret	165
5	(Japan) Masaru Miura	5	5	4	3	1	1	6	9	3	6	6	4	4	162
6	(Japan) Masayuki Ueda	4	6	6	2	2	6	4	3	4			Ret	6	119
7	(Japan) "Dragon"	Ret	Ret	1				3	Ret	Ret	3	5	Ret	3	80
8	(Japan) "Syuji"				6	5	5	9	6	6			6	5	64
9	(Japan) "Yugo"				Ret	6	7	8	8	Ret					22
10	(Japan) Hachiro Osaka							Ret	7	Ret					6
Pos	Driver	R1	R2	R3	R4	R5	R6	R7	R8	R9	R10	R11	R12	R13	Pts
Pos	Driver	OKA			MOT			FUJ			SUG		SUZ		Pts

=== Teams' standings ===
Only the best finishing driver of each team was eligible for teams' championship points.

Pos	Team	OKA			MOT			FUJ			SUG		SUZ		Pts
Pos	Team	R1	R2	R3	R4	R5	R6	R7	R8	R9	R10	R11	R12	R13	Pts
1	TOM'S Youth	2	2	2	2	1	2	1	3	2	1	5	4	1	245
2	Super License	4	3	4	3	3	3	3	1	3	5	4	3	4	188
3	PONOS Racing	11	10	10	1	2	1	10	10	9	2	2	2	2	146
4	Sutekina Racing Team	6	4	8				4	2	4	9	6	1	3	116
5	B-Max Engineering	8	7	6	7	6	6	5	4	6	6	7	5	5	104
6	D'station Racing							2	7	1	3	1			89
7	Rn-sports	9	9	9	4	5	7	7	6	8	4	3	Ret	7	85
8	CMS motor sports project	10	8	7	5	4	4	8	11	7	8	9	6	6	77
9	Eagle Sports	7	6	Ret	7	Ret	5	6	5	5	7	8	7	Ret	76
10	Yoshiaki Katayama (privateer)	1	1	1											75
11	Yusuke Shiotsu (privateer)	3	5	3											40
12	RaiseUPMotorSport	4	Ret	4											20
13	N-Speed				Ret	7	8	9	9	Ret					14
14	Zap Speed							Ret	8	Ret					4
Pos	Driver	R1	R2	R3	R4	R5	R6	R7	R8	R9	R10	R11	R12	R13	Pts
Pos	Driver	OKA			MOT			FUJ			SUG		SUZ		Pts
