= Servus Japan =

Japanese racing team

Servus Japan Co, Ltd.
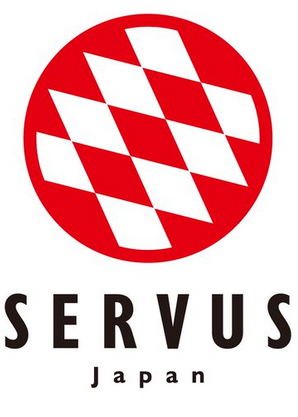
- Founded: 2007
- Base: Tokyo
- Current series: Super GT GT300; Super Formula; Formula Regional Japanese Championship
- Former series: Super GT GT500
- Current drivers: Super Formula (TGM Grand Prix): (Japan) Kazuto Kotaka; (Japan) Hibiki Taira; Super GT - GT300 (Team Studie): TBA; TBA; Super GT - GT300 (Team UpGarage): (Japan) Takashi Kobayashi; (Japan) Yuto Nomura
- Teams' Championships: 2023 Formula Regional Japanese; 2020 Formula Regional Japanese; 2019 Super GT - GT300
- Drivers' Championships: 2020 Formula Regional Japanese; 2019 Super GT
- Website: www.servusjapan.com

Servus Japan Co, Ltd. is a Japanese racing team that competes in Super Formula, Super GT GT300, and Formula Regional Japanese Championship. The company runs TGM Grand Prix in Super Formula, Studie, Team UpGarage in Super GT, and Team Sutekina in Formula Regional Japan.

== History ==
=== Super GT ===
Servus Japan has run in Super GT alongside Autobacs Racing Team Aguri or ARTA in both GT 500 & GT300, where they have been working since 2007. Servus Japan also started to run Team UpGarage in 2019. Both ARTA & Team UpGarage ran Honda NSX GT3 Evo. Team Goh returned to Super GT, as the team ran under the name McLaren Customer Racing Japan. Seiji Ara, and Alex Palou were the drivers. Shinichi Takagi & Nirei Fukuzumi won the GT300 title in 2019. BMW Team Studie entered the GT300 class for the first time since 2017 under the name "BMW Team Studie x CSL", using the current BMW M6 GT3. Kazumichi Goh, the owner of Team Goh, was appointed as the Representative Director of the team. BMW Team Studie x CSL welcomed 2004 24 Hours of Le Mans winner Seiji Ara back to the team, alongside rookie gentleman driver Tomohide Yamaguchi. BMW Works driver Augusto Farfus was announced as a third driver, but did not appear due to COVID-19 travel restrictions. In 2023, Mugen (M-TEC) and ARTA formed a strategic alliance, competing with two ARTA Mugen-branded cars under the ARTA entrant name. which ended a long standing collaboration. Yogibo Racing returned to Super GT as an independent team, having previously competed in a collaboration with Drago Corse in the 2021 season. The team entered a Honda NSX GT3 and received technical support from Servus, who previously supported ARTA's GT300 programme. F4 Japanese Championship graduates Reimei Ito and Yugo Iwasawa were the full-time drivers, making their series debuts. Yogibo Racing withdrew its entry for the 2024 season, citing a change in corporate strategy from the Yogibo brand. Which left Servus only running Team UpGarage and Studie.

=== Super Formula ===
Servus Japan's first involvement with Super Formula is running Drago Corse team which is owned by Ryo Michigami since 2014. The team participated in the final two races of the 2014 Super Formula season with Takuya Izawa as the driver, achieving a best finish of 14th. For 2015, the team raced with Takashi Kogure for two seasons, finishing 15th in 2015 and 13th in 2016. At the end of 2016, Drago Corse discontinued their operation in Super Formula and Super GT GT500 as Michigami competed for the JAS Motorsport-run Honda team in the 2017 World Touring Car Championship.

In 2021, Team Goh returned to the series, and linked up with Mugen Motorsports as The team was named Red Bull Mugen Team Goh. Hiroki Otsu got a full time seat after an appearance in the last round in 2020, as he raced with Red Bull Mugen Team Goh. The team grabbed first win in Motegi towards the end of the year. For 2022 Team Goh ran independently, and they filled two car with Red Bull Junior driver Ren Sato, and Atsushi Miyake. Both drivers got a podium that season. Red Bull left Team Goh and moved its sponsorship efforts to Liam Lawson's Team Mugen entry. The loss of this sponsorship left Team Goh in doubts whether they would be able to continue their participation in the championship for 2023. the organization later announced that the team would relaunch as TGM Grand Prix and confirmed that they would run two cars in 2023. Toshiki Oyu, and Turkish driver Cem Bolukbasi confirmed as the drivers for the team.

=== Formula Regional Japanese ===
Servus also run in the Formula Regional Japanese Championship with Sutekina Racing Team from 2020. The team and Sena Sakaguchi won the series title in the series debut, with Sakaguchi winning all eleven races that he competed in, taking the championship by just over 50 points despite missing the Sugo round.
