= 2020 Formula Regional Japanese Championship =

Motor racing competition

The 2020 Formula Regional Japanese Championship was a multi-event, Formula 3 open-wheel single seater motor racing championship held in Japan. The drivers were competing in Formula Regional cars that conform to the FIA Formula Regional regulations for the championship. This was the inaugural season of the championship, and was promoted by K2 Planet.

The season started on 1 August at Fuji Speedway and ran until 13 December.

== Teams and drivers ==
All teams and drivers competed using the Dome F111/3 Regional F3 car.

Team	No.	Driver	Status	Rounds
Sutekina Racing Team	3	(Japan) Sena Sakaguchi		1, 3–6
Sutekina Racing Team	5	(Japan) Yu Kanamaru		1, 6
Sutekina Racing Team	5	(Japan) Miku Ikejima		3
Sutekina Racing Team	8	(Japan) Takuro Shinohara		1
Sutekina Racing Team	8	(Japan) Mizuki Ishizaka		5
Sutekina Racing Team	8	(Japan) Miku Ikejima		6
Eagle Sport	4	(Japan) Nobuhiro Imada	M	1
JMS Racing	4	(Japan) Nobuhiro Imada	M	2–5
Super License	5	(Japan) Takashi Hata		5
Super License	6	(Japan) Tomoki Takahashi		1–3
Super License	6	(Japan) Ai Miura		4–5
Zap Speed	8	(Japan) Yuki Nemoto		2
Zap Speed	8	(Japan) Riki Okusa		3
Zap Speed	86	(Japan) Hachiro Osaka	M	1
Zap Speed	86	(Japan) Miki Koyama		3
Rn-sports	11	(Japan) Masayuki Ueda	M	1–5
B-Max Engineering	13	(Japan) Motoyoshi Yoshida	M	1, 3
B-Max Engineering	27	(Japan) Syuji	M	1–5
B-Max Engineering	30	(Japan) "Dragon"	M	1–5
N-SPEED	23	(Japan) Yugo	M	3
TOM'S Youth	28	(Japan) Yuga Furutani		All
CMS motor sports project	34	(Japan) Masaru Miura	M	1, 4
Saccess Racing	39	(Japan) Daichi Okamoto		3
Team Goh	55	(Japan) Satoshi Motoyama		6
Field Racing	78	(Japan) Ryohei Sakaguchi		1

Icon	Class
M	Masters' Cup.

== Race calendar ==
The initial calendar was announced on 27 December 2019. After the COVID-19 pandemic forced the postponement of two races, a revised schedule was announced on 17 June 2020, with 14 races across 6 meetings, starting on 1 August and running until December.

Round		Circuit	Date	Pole position	Fastest lap	Winning driver	Winning team	Supporting
1	R1	Fuji Speedway	1 August	(Japan) Sena Sakaguchi	(Japan) Sena Sakaguchi	(Japan) Sena Sakaguchi	Sutekina Racing Team	The One Make Race Festival
1	R2	Fuji Speedway	1 August	(Japan) Sena Sakaguchi	(Japan) Sena Sakaguchi	(Japan) Sena Sakaguchi	Sutekina Racing Team	The One Make Race Festival
1	R3	Fuji Speedway	2 August	(Japan) Sena Sakaguchi	(Japan) Sena Sakaguchi	(Japan) Sena Sakaguchi	Sutekina Racing Team	The One Make Race Festival
2	R4	Sportsland SUGO	22 August	(Japan) Tomoki Takahashi	(Japan) Tomoki Takahashi	(Japan) Tomoki Takahashi	Super License	SUGO Champion Cup
2	R5	Sportsland SUGO	23 August	(Japan) Tomoki Takahashi	(Japan) Yuga Furutani	(Japan) Yuki Nemoto	Zap Speed	SUGO Champion Cup
2	R6	Sportsland SUGO	23 August	(Japan) Tomoki Takahashi	(Japan) Tomoki Takahashi	(Japan) Tomoki Takahashi	Super License	SUGO Champion Cup
3	R7	Fuji Speedway	5 September	(Japan) Sena Sakaguchi	(Japan) Sena Sakaguchi	(Japan) Sena Sakaguchi	Sutekina Racing Team	Super Taikyu
3	R8	Fuji Speedway	5 September	(Japan) Sena Sakaguchi	(Japan) Sena Sakaguchi	(Japan) Sena Sakaguchi	Sutekina Racing Team	Super Taikyu
4	R9	Twin Ring Motegi	19 September	(Japan) Sena Sakaguchi	(Japan) Sena Sakaguchi	(Japan) Sena Sakaguchi	Sutekina Racing Team	Motegi Champion Cup
4	R10	Twin Ring Motegi	20 September	(Japan) Sena Sakaguchi	(Japan) Sena Sakaguchi	(Japan) Sena Sakaguchi	Sutekina Racing Team	Motegi Champion Cup
5	R11	Okayama International Circuit	1 November	(Japan) Sena Sakaguchi	(Japan) Yuga Furutani	(Japan) Sena Sakaguchi	Sutekina Racing Team	Super Taikyu
5	R12	Okayama International Circuit	1 November	(Japan) Sena Sakaguchi	(Japan) Sena Sakaguchi	(Japan) Sena Sakaguchi	Sutekina Racing Team	Super Taikyu
6	R13	Autopolis	12 December	(Japan) Yuga Furutani	(Japan) Yuga Furutani	(Japan) Sena Sakaguchi	Sutekina Racing Team	Super Taikyu
6	R14	Autopolis	12 December	(Japan) Yuga Furutani	(Japan) Yuga Furutani	(Japan) Sena Sakaguchi	Sutekina Racing Team	Super Taikyu

== Championship standings ==
=== Scoring system ===
Points were awarded to the top ten drivers.

Position	1st	2nd	3rd	4th	5th	6th	7th	8th	9th	10th
Points	25	18	15	12	10	8	6	4	2	1

=== Drivers' championship ===
Pos	Driver	FUJ1			SUG			FUJ2		MOT		OKA		AUT		Pts
Pos	Driver	R1	R2	R3	R4	R5	R6	R7	R8	R9	R10	R11	R12	R13	R14	Pts
1	(Japan) Sena Sakaguchi	1	1	1				1	1	1	1	1	1	1	1	275
2	(Japan) Yuga Furutani	4	5	4	2	3	3	3	2	2	2	2	2	2	2	223
3	(Japan) Tomoki Takahashi	6	3	2	1	2	1	2	4							139
4	(Japan) Masayuki Ueda	9	8	9	5	4	6	9	8	7	3	6	7			79
5	(Japan) Nobuhiro Imada	7	10	7	4	6	4	8	13	4	5	9	8			77
6	(Japan) "Dragon"	DNS	7	8	6	5	5	6	7	6	Ret	7	5			76
7	(Japan) Yu Kanamaru	2	4	3										3	3	75
8	(Japan) Yuki Nemoto				3	1	2									58
9	(Japan) Takuro Shinohara	3	2	5												43
10	(Japan) "Syuji"	12	11	13	7	7	7	11	10	8	4	8	9			41
11	(Japan) Ai Miura									3	Ret	4	4			39
12	(Japan) Mizuki Ishizaka											3	3			30
13	(Japan) Ryohei Sakaguchi	5	6	6												26
14	(Japan) Riki Okusa							5	3							25
15	(Japan) Miku Ikejima							10	9					5	4	25
16	(Japan) Satoshi Motoyama													4	5	22
17	(Japan) Daichi Okamoto							4	6							20
18	(Japan) Takashi Hata											5	6			18
19	(Japan) Masaru Miura	8	9	10						5	Ret					17
20	(Japan) Miki Koyama							7	5							16
21	(Japan) Hachiro Osaka	10	12	11												1
22	(Japan) Motoyoshi Yoshida	11	13	12				12	12							0
23	(Japan) "Yugo"							13	11							0
Pos	Driver	R1	R2	R3	R4	R5	R6	R7	R8	R9	R10	R11	R12	R13	R14	Pts
Pos	Driver	FUJ1			SUG			FUJ2		MOT		OKA		AUT		Pts

=== Masters class ===
Pos	Driver	FUJ1			SUG			FUJ2		MOT		OKA		AUT		Pts
Pos	Driver	R1	R2	R3	R4	R5	R6	R7	R8	R9	R10	R11	R12	R13	R14	Pts
1	(Japan) Nobuhiro Imada	1	4	1	1	3	1	2	6	1	3	4	3			220
2	(Japan) Masayuki Ueda	3	2	3	2	1	3	3	2	4	1	1	2			219
3	(Japan) "Dragon"	DNS	1	2	3	2	2	1	1	3	Ret	2	1			202
4	(Japan) "Syuji"	6	5	7	4	4	4	4	3	5	2	3	4			142
5	(Japan) Masaru Miura	2	3	4						2	Ret					63
6	(Japan) Motoyoshi Yoshida	5	7	6				5	5							44
7	(Japan) Hachiro Osaka	4	6	5												30
8	(Japan) "Yugo"							6	4							20
Pos	Driver	R1	R2	R3	R4	R5	R6	R7	R8	R9	R10	R11	R12	R13	R14	Pts
Pos	Driver	FUJ1			SUG			FUJ2		MOT		OKA		AUT		Pts

=== Teams' standings ===
Pos	Driver	FUJ1			SUG			FUJ2		MOT		OKA		AUT		Pts
Pos	Driver	R1	R2	R3	R4	R5	R6	R7	R8	R9	R10	R11	R12	R13	R14	Pts
1	Sutekina Racing Team	1	1	1				1	1	1	1	1	1	1	1	275
2	TOM'S Youth	2	3	3	2	3	3	3	2	2	2	2	2	2	2	237
3	Super License	4	2	2	1	2	1	2	4	3	Ret	3	3			191
4	B-Max Engineering	9	5	6	6	5	5	6	6	6	4	5	4			106
5	Rn-sports	7	6	7	5	4	6	8	7	7	3	9	5			103
6	Zap Speed	8	9	9	3	1	2	5	3							91
7	JMS Racing				4	6	4	7	9	4	5	6	6			78
8	Field Racing	3	5	5												39
9	Team Goh													3	3	30
10	CMS motor sports project	6	7	8						5	Ret					28
11	Eagle Sports	5	8	5												24
12	Saccess Racing							4	5							22
13	N-SPEED							9	8							6
Pos	Driver	R1	R2	R3	R4	R5	R6	R7	R8	R9	R10	R11	R12	R13	R14	Pts
Pos	Driver	FUJ1			SUG			FUJ2		MOT		OKA		AUT		Pts
