= Toda Racing =

Japanese racing team

(Japan) TODA Racing
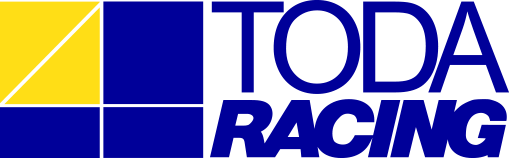
- Founded: 1971
- Base: Kurashiki, Okayama Prefecture
- Current series: Super Formula Lights
- Current drivers: (Japan) Souta Arao
- Website: www.toda-racing.co.jp

TODA RACING Co., Ltd. is a Japanese automotive parts supplier and racing engine constructor. It also operates its own racing team.

== History ==
Founded in 1971 by Yukio Toda. Since it was founded, the company has been tuning Honda engines, so it has a deep relationship with Honda, but it also tunes engines for Toyota, BMW, and other manufacturers. The company also actively sells aftermarket parts to general users. Since its founding, the company has supplied its own engines and chassis for junior formula races such as FJ1300 and FL500.

Since it began competing in the All-Japan F3 Championship with its own team in 1988, it has continued to compete intermittently to the present day, and has been competing for many years with TOM'S, DOME, INGING Motorsport, and others as a major user of the Mugen MF204 engine. In particular, since M-TEC the developer of the MF204 engine withdrew from All Japan F3 in 2007, the company has developed its own engines and participated in the race since 2008. Since 2013, it has participated in the Japanese F3 with its completely in-house engine, the TR-F301. But due to issues such as engine development costs, it has stopped participating with the TR-F301 at the end of 2020. In Super Formula Lights, TODA has used Siegfried Spiess Motorenbau GmbH engines before the series change into one-make engine from TOM'S.

During their Formula 3 & Super Formula Lights period, they have not won a single constructor title. But they have won many races from Tadasuke Makino, Toshiki Oyu, Ren Sato, Kakunoshin Ohta, and Syun Koide as their drivers.
