= Souta Arao =

Japanese racing driver

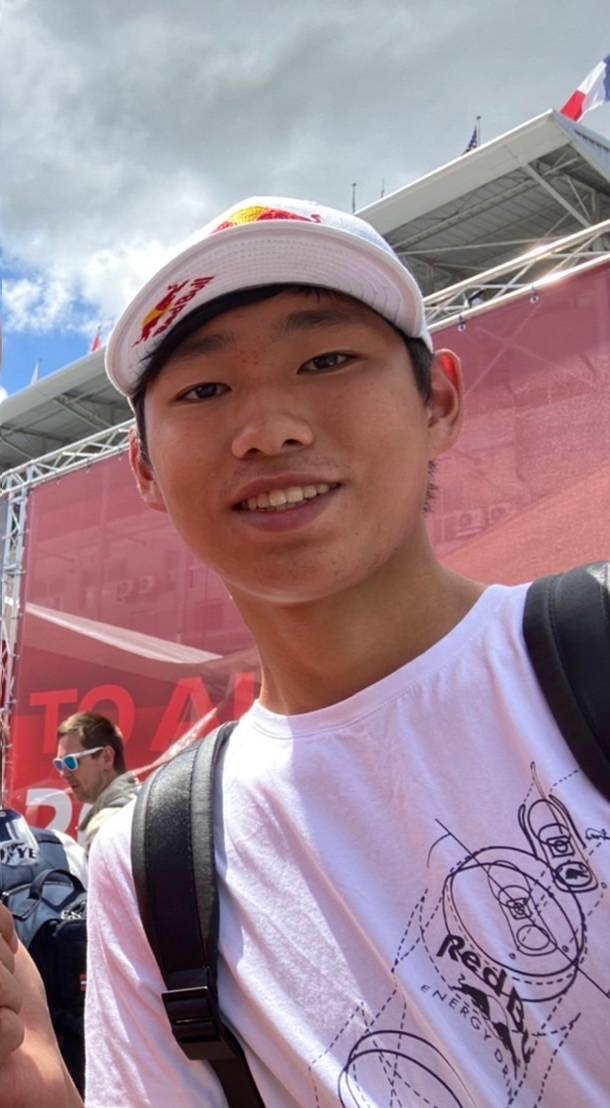
- Arao in 2022
- Nationality: (Japan) Japanese
- Born: 18 December 2005 (age 20) Tokyo, Japan

Super GT - GT300 career
- Debut season: 2026
- Current team: Team Mach
- Car number: 5
- Starts: 0
- Wins: 0
- Podiums: 0
- Poles: 0
- Fastest laps: 0
- Best finish: TBD in 2026

Previous series
- 2024–2025 2023 2022: Super Formula Lights; GB3 Championship; French F4 Championship

Souta Arao (荒尾創大, Arao Sōta; born 18 December 2005) is a Japanese racing driver who is set to compete in the 2026 Super GT Series for Team Mach. He previously raced in Super Formula Lights, the French F4 Championship & GB3 Championship. He is a scholar of the Honda Racing School which formerly as Suzuka Racing School, and part of the Honda Formula Dream Project.

== Career ==
=== Karting ===
Arao started karting in 2012. In 2021 he became OK vice-champion in the All Japan Kart Championship.

=== Formula 4 ===
Arao made his single-seater debut in 2022, competing in the French F4 Championship. He started his season in strong fashion, getting a podium in the season opener at Nogaro and finishing fifth in Race 3. More success came at the following round in Pau, where, having taken pole position and finished second in the first race, Arao achieved his first victory in car racing on Sunday, beating out championship leader Hugh Barter. The next four rounds yielded a podium each, with a highest result of second at Spa-Francorchamps, before he won Race 1 at the season finale in Le Castellet. He ended up third in the standings, four places ahead of fellow Red Bull Junior Yuto Nomura.

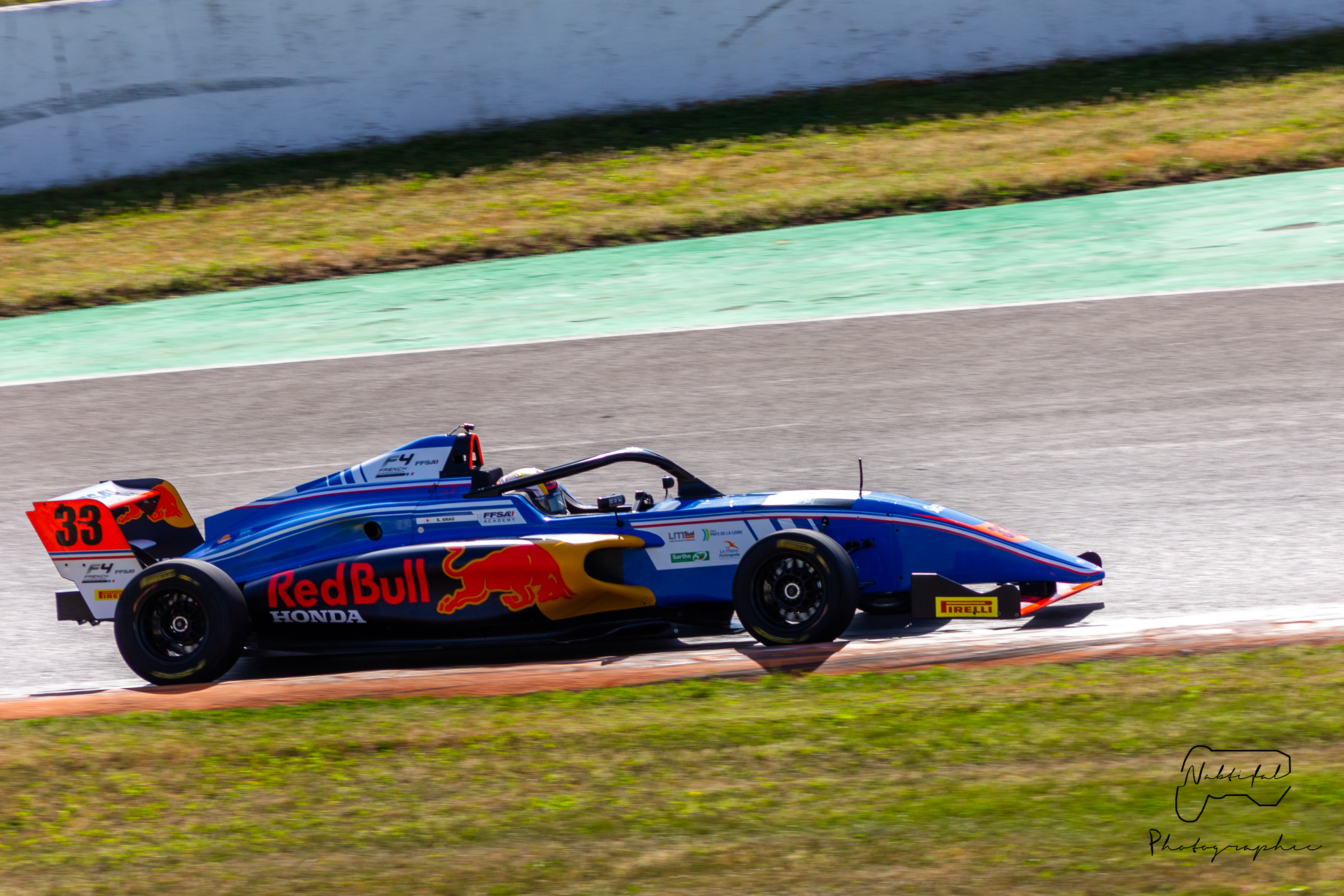
Arao driving at Magny Cours in 2022.

=== GB3 Championship ===
For the 2023 season, it was announced that Arao would move up to the GB3 Championship, driving for Hitech Grand Prix alongside Alex Dunne and Michael Shin. Throughout the season, Arao showed pace but struggled to achieve good results. His best race results were two fifth places in the final two round at Circuit Zandvoort and Donington Park, which moved him up to 17th in the standings.

=== Super Formula Lights ===
Arao returned to Japan for 2024, racing in Super Formula Lights with Toda Racing. Arao then moved to Delightworks Racing for his second year in the series in 2025.

=== Red Bull Junior Team ===
Arao was a member of the Red Bull Junior Team He was part of the academy from 2022 until the end of 2023.

== Racing record ==
=== Racing career summary ===
Season	Series	Team	Races	Wins	Poles	F/Laps	Podiums	Points	Position
2022	French F4 Championship	FFSA Academy	21	2	1	2	9	227	**3rd**
2023	GB3 Championship	Hitech Grand Prix	21	0	0	1	0	146	17th
2024	Super Formula Lights	Toda Racing	18	0	0	1	4	43	7th
2024	Super Taikyu - ST-Q	Team HRC	1	0	0	0	1	0‡	NC‡
2025	Super Formula Lights	Delightworks Racing	3	0	0	0	0	0	13th
2026	Super GT - GT300	Team Mach	7	0	0	0	0	22	28th
2026	Super Formula	ThreeBond Racing	Reserve driver						

^{*} Season still in progress.
‡ Team standings

=== Complete French F4 Championship results ===
(key) (Races in bold indicate pole position) (Races in italics indicate fastest lap)

Year	1	2	3	4	5	6	7	8	9	10	11	12	13	14	15	16	17	18	19	20	21	Pos	Points
2022	NOG; 1; 2	NOG; 2; 9	NOG; 3; 5	**PAU**; **1**; 2	PAU; 2; 20†	PAU; 3; 1	MAG; 1; 3	MAG; 2; 5	MAG; 3 Ret	SPA; 1; 4	SPA; 2; 5	SPA; 3; 2	LÉD; 1; 3	LÉD; 2; 9	LÉD; 3; 7	CRT; 1; 3	CRT; 2; 7	CRT; 3; 18	LEC; 1; 1	LEC; 2; 9	LEC; 3; 2	3rd	227

=== Complete GB3 Championship results ===
(key) (Races in bold indicate pole position) (Races in italics indicate fastest lap)

Year	Team	1	2	3	4	5	6	7	8	9	10	11	12	13	14	15	16	17	18	19	20	21	22	23	24	DC	Points
2023	Hitech Grand Prix	OUL; 1 Ret	OUL; 2; 6	OUL; 3; 15^{7}	SIL1; 1 Ret	SIL1; 2 Ret	SIL1; 3 WD	SPA; 1; 13	SPA; 2 Ret	SPA; 3; 13^{2}	SNE; 1; 8	SNE; 2; 10	SNE; 3; 22	SIL2; 1; 13	SIL2; 2; 18	SIL2; 3 C	BRH; 1 DNS	BRH; 2; 14	BRH; 3 Ret	ZAN; 1; 5	ZAN; 2; 9	ZAN; 3; 17^{3}	DON; 1; 5	DON; 2; 13	DON; 3; 15^{4}	17th	146

=== Complete Super Formula Lights results ===
(key) (Races in bold indicate pole position) (Races in italics indicate fastest lap)

Year	Entrant	1	2	3	4	5	6	7	8	9	10	11	12	13	14	15	16	17	18	Pos	Points
2024	Toda Racing	AUT; 1; 7	AUT; 2; 7	AUT; 3; 7	SUG; 1; 6	SUG; 2; 2	SUG; 3; 7	FUJ; 1; 4	FUJ; 2; 3	FUJ; 3; 6	OKA; 1; 6	OKA; 2; 6	OKA; 3; 5	SUZ; 1; 2	SUZ; 2; 5	SUZ; 3; 2	MOT; 1; 4	MOT; 2; 5	MOT; 3; 7	7th	43
2025	Delightworks Racing	SUZ; 1; 8	SUZ; 2; 11	SUZ; 3; 7	AUT; 1	AUT; 2	AUT; 3	OKA; 1	OKA; 2	OKA; 3	SUG; 1	SUG; 2	SUG; 3	FUJ; 1	FUJ; 2	FUJ; 3	MOT; 1	MOT; 2	MOT; 3	13th	0

=== Complete Super GT results ===
(key) (Races in bold indicate pole position; races in italics indicate fastest lap)

Year	Team	Car	Class	1	2	3	4	5	6	7	8	DC	Points
2026	Team Mach	Toyota 86 MC	GT300	OKA; 11	FUJ; 25	FUJ; 22	SUZ; 8	SUG; WD	AUT; 14	MOT; 9	MOT; 16	28th	22
