= 2026 Super Formula Championship =

Japanese open-wheel motor racing event

The 2026 Japanese Super Formula Championship was the fifty-fourth season of premier Japanese single-seater motor racing, and the fourteenth under the moniker of Super Formula. The season started in April at Mobility Resort Motegi and was contested over 12 rounds in seven race weekends, ending in November at Suzuka International Racing Course.

Kakunoshin Ohta, driving for Docomo Team Dandelion Racing, won his first Super Formula Drivers' Championship at the penultimate race of the season, and in doing so also helped his team win their third Teams' Championship title in a row.

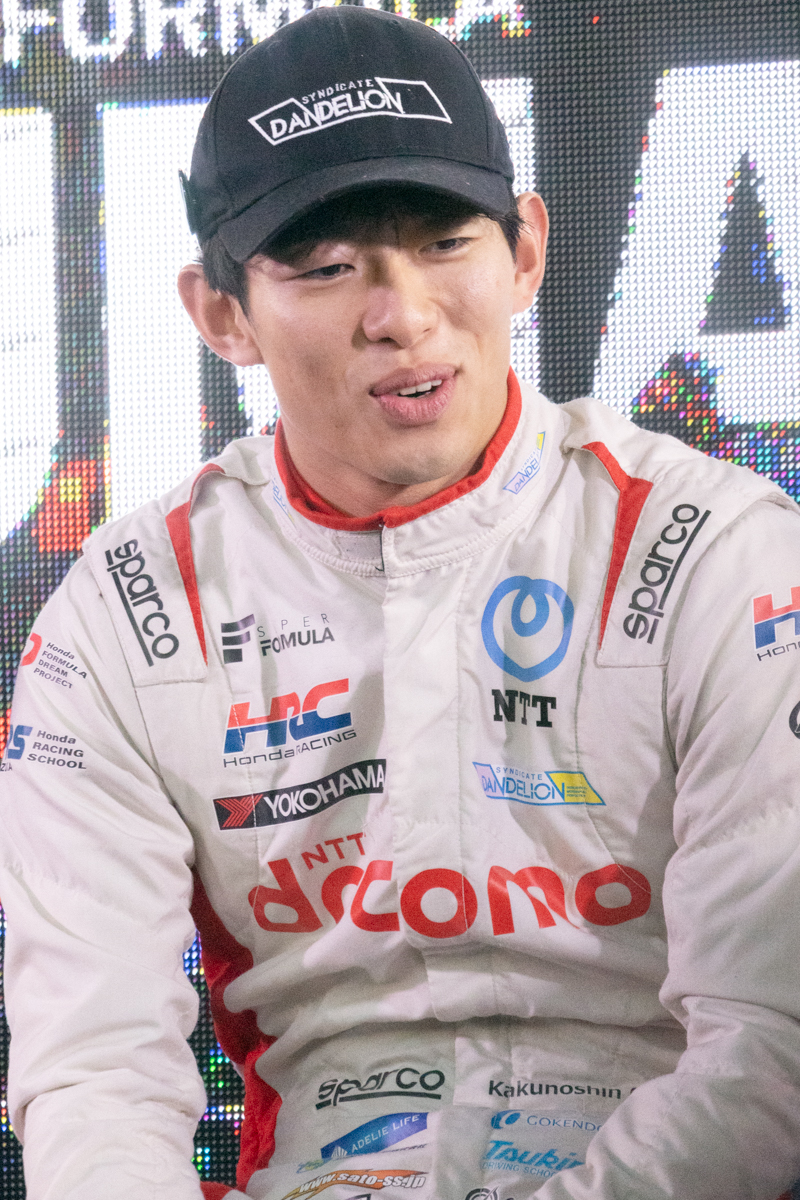
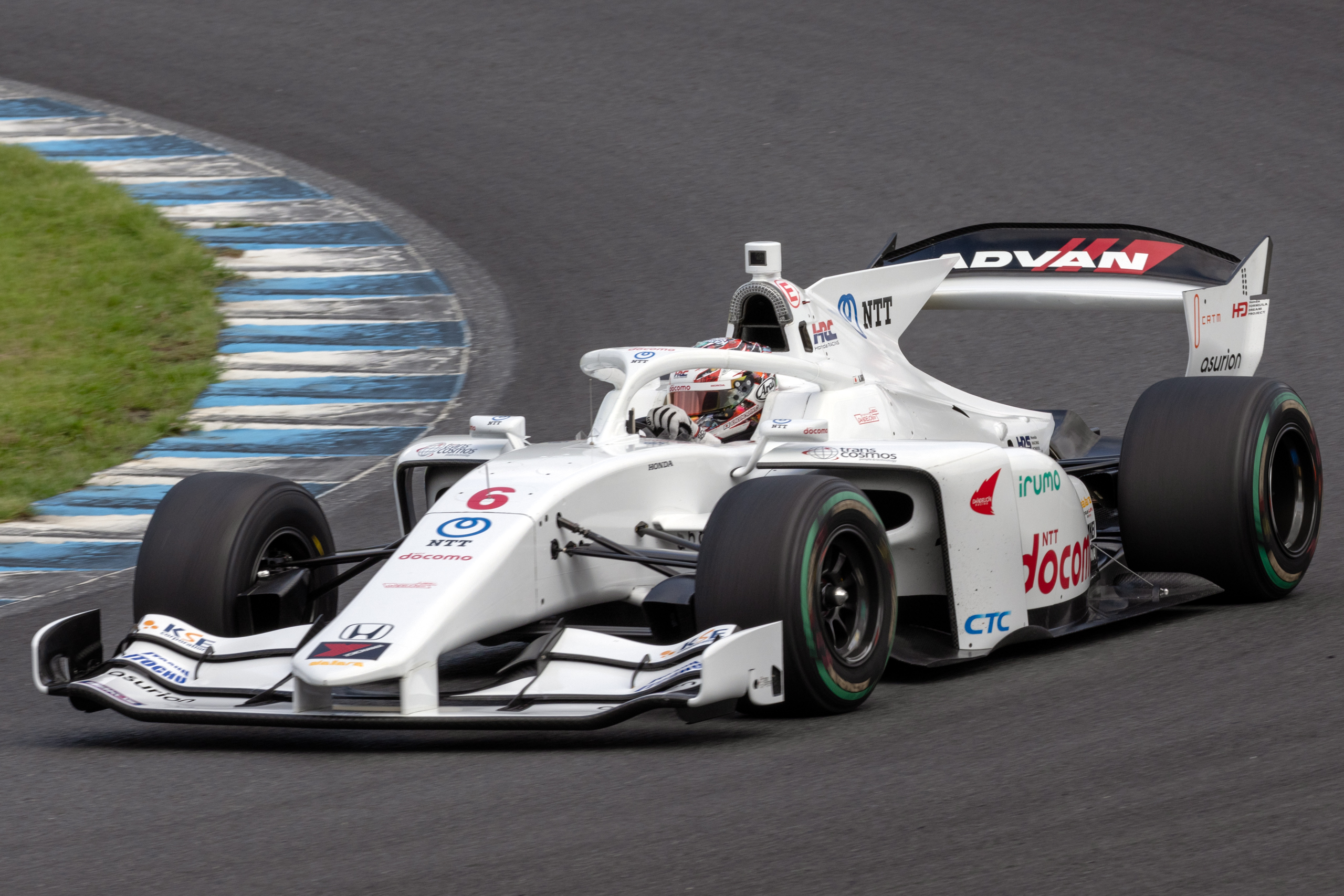
Kakunoshin Ohta (left) and Dandelion Racing (right) won the Drivers' and Teams' Championships, respectively.

== Teams and drivers ==
All teams used identical Dallara-built SF23 chassis with either Honda or Toyota engines. Every Honda-powered car used a Honda HR-417E engine and every Toyota-powered car used a Toyota TRD-01F engine. All teams competed with tyres supplied by Yokohama.

Entrant	Engine	No.	Driver name	Rounds	Ref.
(Japan) Team Mugen Autobacs	Honda	1	(Japan) Ayumu Iwasa	All	
(Japan) Team Mugen Autobacs	Honda	16	(Japan) Tomoki Nojiri	All	
(Japan) Realize Kondo Racing	Toyota	3	(United Kingdom) Luke Browning	All	
(Japan) Realize Kondo Racing	Toyota	4	(Japan) Ukyo Sasahara	All	
(Japan) Navikuru Buzz MK Racing	Toyota	97	(Czech Republic) Roman Staněk	All	
(Japan) Docomo Team Dandelion Racing	Honda	5	(Japan) Tadasuke Makino	All	
(Japan) Docomo Team Dandelion Racing	Honda	6	(Japan) Kakunoshin Ohta	All	
(Japan) KDDI TGMGP TGR-DC	Toyota	7	(Japan) Kamui Kobayashi	All	
(Japan) KDDI TGMGP TGR-DC	Toyota	28	(Japan) Rikuto Kobayashi	All	
(Japan) Team Goh	Toyota	53	(Austria) Charlie Wurz	All	
(Hong Kong) KCMG	Toyota	8	(Japan) Kenta Yamashita	All	
(Hong Kong) KCMG	Toyota	9	(Japan) Seita Nonaka	1–5	
(Hong Kong) KCMG	Toyota	9	(France) Giuliano Alesi	6–12	
(Japan) Hazama Ando Triple Tree Racing	Honda	10	(Japan) "Juju"	All	
(Japan) ThreeBond Racing	Honda	12	(Japan) Syun Koide	All	
(Japan) NTT Docomo Business Rookie	Toyota	14	(Japan) Nirei Fukuzumi	All	
(Japan) Team Impul	Toyota	19	(United Kingdom) Zak O'Sullivan	1–10	
(Japan) Team Impul	Toyota	19	(Japan) Tokiya Suzuki	11–12	
(Japan) Delightworks Racing	Honda	22	(Japan) Nobuharu Matsushita	All	
(Japan) Vantelin Team TOM'S	Toyota	36	(Japan) Sho Tsuboi	All	
(Japan) Vantelin Team TOM'S	Toyota	37	(Argentina) Sacha Fenestraz	All	
(Japan) Sanki Vertex Partners Cerumo・Inging	Toyota	38	(Japan) Sena Sakaguchi	All	
(Japan) Sanki Vertex Partners Cerumo・Inging	Toyota	38	(Japan) Kazuhisa Urabe	9–10	
(Japan) Sanki Vertex Partners Cerumo・Inging	Toyota	39	(Japan) Toshiki Oyu	All	
(Japan) San-Ei Gen with B-Max	Honda	50	(Japan) Yuto Nomura	All	
(Japan) Ponos Nakajima Racing	Honda	64	(Japan) Ren Sato	All	
(Japan) Ponos Nakajima Racing	Honda	65	(Brazil) Igor Omura Fraga	All	

=== Team changes ===
- Super Formula Lights team Delightworks Racing joined the series. The team used Honda engines and received operational support from Toda Racing.
- TGM Grand Prix expanded to three Toyota-powered cars, adding a single car entered under the Team Goh name, which returned to Super Formula after a three-year absence.
- Transport and logistics company Realize Corporation, a longtime sponsor of Kondo Racing, officially became the team's title sponsor, with the team entering as Realize Kondo Racing. Kondo Racing also expanded to three Toyota-powered cars, adding a single car sponsored by used vehicle marketplace Navikuru running under the name Navikuru Buzz MK Racing.
- Automotive parts and accessories retailer Autobacs Seven officially became Team Mugen's title sponsor, with the team entering as Team Mugen Autobacs.

=== Driver changes ===
- Nobuharu Matsushita returned to Super Formula for the first time since 2024 with the new Delightworks Racing team after a year on the sidelines where he competed in Super GT GT500 with ARTA.
- Two-time FIA World Rally Champion Kalle Rovanperä announced he would switch to single-seater racing and debut in Super Formula in 2026, before being confirmed to drive for KCMG. Ahead of the season, the team announced his withdrawal from the campaign after he was diagnosed with benign paroxysmal positional vertigo. KCMG's reserve driver Seita Nonaka replaced him for the first five rounds. The other KCMG car was piloted by Kenta Yamashita, who departed Kondo Racing after nine seasons. These drivers replaced Kamui Kobayashi and Nirei Fukuzumi, who moved to TGMGP TGR-DC and Rookie Racing respectively.
- Following Yamashita's departure to KCMG, Zak O'Sullivan also left Kondo Racing after his rookie season to join Team Impul. That saw Kondo take on two new drivers in Williams F1 Junior Driver Luke Browning, who made his series debut after one and a half seasons in the FIA Formula 2 Championship, and Ukyo Sasahara, who returned to Super Formula after a year away from the series where he competed in Super GT GT500 with Deloitte TOM'S.
- Rookie Racing signed Nirei Fukuzumi from KCMG to replace Kazuya Oshima, who retired from the series after 13 seasons of competition.
- Both Oliver Rasmussen and Mitsunori Takaboshi left Team Impul after one season, with Takaboshi focusing on his Super GT GT500 efforts with NISMO. The Team recruited former Kondo Racing driver Zak O'Sullivan for his sophomore season.
- TGMGP also renewed their lineup as Kazuto Kotaka, Hibiki Taira, and Seita Nonaka all left the team, with Kotaka and Taira focusing on their Super GT GT300 campaigns and Nonaka moving to KCMG. Kamui Kobayashi left KCMG after nine seasons to drive for TGMGP TGR-DC, using the number 7 he had used at KCMG, and Rikuto Kobayashi made his full-time Super Formula debut with the team after two seasons in Super Formula Lights and two one-off Super Formula entries for Team Impul in 2025.
- Second-generation driver Charlie Wurz made his series debut with Team Goh after two seasons in the FIA Formula 3 Championship.
- Reigning Super Formula Lights champion and Honda Formula Dream Project graduate Yuto Nomura made his series debut with B-Max Racing Team. He replaced Syun Koide, who joined ThreeBond Racing to replace Atsushi Miyake, who departed after two seasons to focus on his Super GT GT500 efforts with Kondo Racing.
- After 3 seasons in FIA Formula 2 Championship, Roman Staněk made his series debut for Kondo's Buzz MK Racing outfit.

==== Mid-season ====
- Giuliano Alesi returned to the series for the first time since he was dropped mid-way through the 2023 season, joining KCMG from round six onwards. Nonaka was demoted back to a reserve driver role, but made his final appearance in the postponed race three, which he qualified for in Autopolis.
- Sena Sakaguchi was forced to withdraw from rounds 9 and 10 at Fuji after suffering an eye injury. He was replaced by Kazuhisa Urabe, who debuted in Super Formula after finishing 7th in Super Formula Lights with Delightworks Racing.
- Zak O'Sullivan was absent from the final two rounds at Suzuka as he prioritized the Formula E pre-season test held in the same week. To replace him, Team Impul appointed 2025 F4 Japanese champion Tokiya Suzuki, who made his debut in the series after finishing 4th in Super Formula Lights with TOM'S.

== Race calendar ==
The calendar was announced on 5 August 2025, with 12 races held across seven weekends at five venues.

Round	Circuit	Location	Date	Support bill	Map of circuit locations
1	Mobility Resort Motegi	Motegi, Tochigi	4 April	Honda N-One Owner's Cup; All Japan Road Race Championship	2026 Super Formula Championship is located in Japan
2	Mobility Resort Motegi	Motegi, Tochigi	5 April	Honda N-One Owner's Cup; All Japan Road Race Championship	2026 Super Formula Championship is located in Japan
– (Note: Race postponed and moved to the first Fuji weekend due to adverse weather conditions.)	Autopolis	Hita, Oita	25 April	Super Formula Lights; Honda N-One Owner's Cup	2026 Super Formula Championship is located in Japan
4	Suzuka International Racing Course	Suzuka, Mie	23 May	Super Formula Lights; Formula Regional Japanese Championship	2026 Super Formula Championship is located in Japan
5	Suzuka International Racing Course	Suzuka, Mie	24 May	Super Formula Lights; Formula Regional Japanese Championship	2026 Super Formula Championship is located in Japan
6	Fuji Speedway	Oyama, Shizuoka	18 July	Porsche Carrera Cup Japan; Kyojo Cup	2026 Super Formula Championship is located in Japan
3 (Note: Rescheduled Autopolis race)	Fuji Speedway	Oyama, Shizuoka	19 July	Porsche Carrera Cup Japan; Kyojo Cup	2026 Super Formula Championship is located in Japan
7	Fuji Speedway	Oyama, Shizuoka	19 July	Porsche Carrera Cup Japan; Kyojo Cup	2026 Super Formula Championship is located in Japan
8	Sportsland SUGO	Shibata, Miyagi	9 August	Porsche Carrera Cup Japan; Honda N-One Owner's Cup	2026 Super Formula Championship is located in Japan
9	Fuji Speedway	Oyama, Shizuoka	10 October	Formula Regional Japanese Championship; Kyojo Cup	2026 Super Formula Championship is located in Japan
10	Fuji Speedway	Oyama, Shizuoka	11 October	Formula Regional Japanese Championship; Kyojo Cup	2026 Super Formula Championship is located in Japan
11	Suzuka International Racing Course	Suzuka, Mie	21 November	Toyota Gazoo Racing Yaris Cup - Kansai	2026 Super Formula Championship is located in Japan
12	Suzuka International Racing Course	Suzuka, Mie	22 November	Toyota Gazoo Racing Yaris Cup - Kansai	2026 Super Formula Championship is located in Japan

=== Calendar changes ===
- The first Suzuka race moved from March to May, with Motegi holding the season opener instead.
- Race three, originally scheduled to be held at Autopolis, was postponed to the first Fuji weekend after being called off due to adverse weather conditions.

== Race results ==
Round	Circuit	Pole Position	Fastest Lap	Winning Driver	Winning Team
1	Mobility Resort Motegi	(Japan) Ayumu Iwasa	(Japan) Kakunoshin Ohta	(Japan) Kakunoshin Ohta	(Japan) Docomo Team Dandelion Racing
2	Mobility Resort Motegi	(Japan) Kakunoshin Ohta	(Japan) Sena Sakaguchi	(Japan) Kakunoshin Ohta	(Japan) Docomo Team Dandelion Racing
4	Suzuka International Racing Course	(Japan) Ayumu Iwasa	(Japan) Sho Tsuboi	(Argentina) Sacha Fenestraz	(Japan) Vantelin Team TOM'S
5	Suzuka International Racing Course	(Japan) Nirei Fukuzumi	(Japan) Kamui Kobayashi	(Japan) Nirei Fukuzumi	(Japan) NTT Docomo Business Rookie
6	Fuji Speedway	(United Kingdom) Zak O'Sullivan	(Japan) Kakunoshin Ohta	(Japan) Kakunoshin Ohta	(Japan) Docomo Team Dandelion Racing
3	Fuji Speedway	(Japan) Ayumu Iwasa (Note: Race three, postponed to the first Fuji round in July, had its grid formed according to the results of the qualifying session held at Autopolis on race three's original date. Ayumu Iwasa will start the race from pole position.)	(Brazil) Igor Omura Fraga	(Brazil) Igor Omura Fraga	(Japan) Ponos Nakajima Racing
7	Fuji Speedway	(Japan) Tomoki Nojiri	(Japan) Tadasuke Makino	(Japan) Kakunoshin Ohta	(Japan) Docomo Team Dandelion Racing
8	Sportsland SUGO	(Japan) Tomoki Nojiri	(Brazil) Igor Omura Fraga	(Japan) Nirei Fukuzumi	(Japan) NTT Docomo Business Rookie
9	Fuji Speedway	(Brazil) Igor Omura Fraga	(Japan) Kakunoshin Ohta	(Brazil) Igor Omura Fraga	(Japan) Ponos Nakajima Racing
10	Fuji Speedway	(Brazil) Igor Omura Fraga	(Japan) Kamui Kobayashi	(Japan) Ayumu Iwasa	(Japan) Autobacs Team Mugen
11	Suzuka International Racing Course	(Japan) Ayumu Iwasa	(Japan) Ukyo Sasahara	(Japan) Ayumu Iwasa	(Japan) Autobacs Team Mugen
12	Suzuka International Racing Course	(Japan) Tomoki Nojiri	(Japan) Kakunoshin Ohta	(Japan) Tomoki Nojiri	(Japan) Autobacs Team Mugen

== Season report ==
=== First half ===
For the first time since 2020, the season opener was held at Mobility Resort Motegi, and reigning champion Ayumu Iwasa took pole position for Team Mugen ahead of Team Dandelion's Kakunoshin Ohta. The first race of the season, held in very wet conditions, was red-flagged because of rain after three laps under the safety car. An hour later, it was restarted with twelve more laps under the safety car. The race went green on lap 16, before a crash forced another safety car right away. That was withdrawn on lap 20, and Ohta made a crucial move past Iwasa to take the lead before the race's time window ended after 23 laps were completed. Ohta thereby secured victory, albeit with only half points awarded, with Iwasa second and Ren Sato heading a Nakajima Racing 3–4 after his teammate Igor Fraga overtook Yuto Nomura of B-Max during the brief green flag period.

Ohta continued his strong form in qualifying for the second race by taking pole position, while Toshiki Oyu of Inging took second. Oyu's teammate Sena Sakaguchi jumped from fifth to third at the start of the race, before an early safety car was called after an off for TGMGP's Rikuto Kobayashi. Oyu pitted on lap ten, with Sakaguchi and Ohta staying out for longer to capitalize on clean air. Both drivers were able to overcut Oyu, with Sakaguchi waiting until lap 25 to make his stop. He used his fresher tyres to close up to Ohta, but was unable to make a move for the lead. Ohta won the race to start the season with a double victory, while Oyu lost out even more when his tyres degraded. Nirei Fukuzumi, who stopped on lap 29, also overcut him to secure his Rookie Racing team's first-ever Super Formula podium in the team's seven-year competition history in third place.

The round at Autopolis was called off and postponed due to heavy rain, so the next pair of races was held at Suzuka. Iwasa claimed pole position for the first race ahead of his teammate Tomoki Nojiri. He led the opening part until a heavy crash for KCMG's Seita Nonaka caused a safety car on lap 18. Pitting under yellow saw Iwasa retain the lead ahead of Ohta, but the latter passed him at the restart. Rain then began to fall, and incidents for Fraga and Nojiri caused a second interruption. Many elected to take on wet tires, promoting TOM'S driver Sacha Fenestraz, who stayed out on slicks, into the lead. That decision would turn out to be the right one as the rain did not intensify. Fenestraz headed Delightworks Racing's Nobuharu Matsushita and teammate Sho Tsuboi on dry tires as Ohta, the highest finisher on wet tires, took seventh to keep a 20.5-point lead over Iwasa.

Fukuzumi claimed his team's maiden series pole position, and his first since 2024, in qualifying for the second race. Iwasa qualified second, but initially dropped behind multiple other cars. Fukuzumi controlled the opening stint until Iwasa made his pit stop on lap 21. Fukuzumi and Ohta followed on lap 22, before Iwasa was able to move back into second place past Ohta as the latter exited the pits. Iwasa then challenged Fukuzumi and passed him for the lead on lap 27, before Fukuzumi got back past him one lap later. Iwasa tried once again two laps later, but Fukuzumi was able to fend him off. That brought Ohta into the fight, and Iwasa had to defend his second place. With Ohta unable to make his way past Iwasa, the top three remained static. Fukuzumi took his and his team's maiden victory by 0.2 seconds as Iwasa shortened Ohta's championship advantage to 14.5 points.

Next up was the season's first weekend at Fuji Speedway, where Impul's Zak O'Sullivan mastered the wet conditions in qualifying to take his maiden pole position for the first race. He led Oyu and Kondo's Luke Browning through the first stint, while Dandelion's Tadasuke Makino and Ohta rose up from their lowly qualifying positions. Ohta pitted on lap 20, already in fourth place at that point, and when O'Sullivan pitted on lap 23, Ohta was able to use his warmed up tires to get past him into the lead. O'Sullivan was initially able to stay close to the leader, but then dropped to 1.5 seconds behind as he managed the rest of his race. Ohta took victory after starting 13th, growing his lead over Iwasa to 34.5 points after the latter qualified 22nd and was only able to score one point. Makino stopped on lap 29, but was unable to challenge the top two afterwards and finished third.

Fuji then hosted a shortened race to make up for the cancelled Autopolis round. That race used the qualifying results from Autopolis, placing Iwasa on pole position ahead of Ohta. Iwasa had a bad start and was caught up in a four-car incident that led to his retirement at the opening corner. Ohta took over in the lead as Fraga had a great getaway and moved from ninth on the grid to fourth. When the circuit was cleaned up and the race restarted, Ohta was attacked by Sakaguchi and both ran wide in turn one. Fraga capitalized to take the lead and Nojiri moved into second. Sakaguchi then retired with gearbox problems, while Ohta dropped out of contention as he was hit with a ten-second penalty after a mechanic illegally dryed his grid spot ahead of the race. Fraga took victory ahead of Nojiri and Tsuboi, with Ohta taking eight place to slightly grow his points lead again.

=== Second half ===
The weekend at Fuji concluded with round seven of the championship, started on pole position by Nojiri ahead of Makino. A 45-minute delay and a safety car period preceded the race after Sato's broken gearbox spilled oil on the track. Ohta started third and took the lead in the first four green-flag laps, before Nojiri was the first to pit on lap eleven. Iwasa followed on lap 14 from fourth, which saw the pair cycle to the front once the stops were completed. Ohta waited until lap 26 to make his stop, after which he resumed in third. His much fresher tyres saw him able to close back up to Iwasa, taking second on lap 29 before moving into the lead on lap 30. Nojiri and Iwasa then also dropped off the podium behind Fraga, Makino and Tsuboi. Ohta took his fourth win of the year, which saw him leave Fuji with more than double the points of his nearest challenger Iwasa.

Nojiri doubled up in qualifying at Sportsland SUGO as he took another pole position, this time ahead of Ohta and Fraga. Nojiri led Ohta until both made their pitstops, with Fraga electing to extend his stint. On lap 27, just as Fraga had entered the pitlane, two separate incidents caused a safety car interruption. He was able to beat Nojiri and Ohta when exiting the pits as most other drivers took their stops, but Fukuzumi and Iwasa were able to quickly pass the pitlane before the safety car emerged. That handed them a free stop as the field was held up, so Fukuzumi took the lead and Iwasa slotted into second. The top three remained static after the resumption on lap 36, handing Fukuzumi his second win of the year as Fraga, who heavily criticized the race direction afterwards, took third. Ohta took fourth, minimizing the damage to his lead which now stood at 45.5 points.

Fuji hosted another double-header for rounds nine and ten, and Fraga led Ohta and Nomura in qualifying for the first race. He made a clean start from pole position as Nomura dropped to fifth behind O'Sullivan and Nojiri. The pitstop window opened on lap eleven, but the top three stayed out. Ohta was the first to make his stop on lap 20, with Fraga following right behind on lap 21. Ohta had warmed up tires and threatened Fraga's lead, but the Brazilian managed to stay ahead. He then built a two-second gap before Ohta began closing back in during the final stages. The championship leader then suffered a problem with his steering that saw him drop away from contention and allowed O'Sullivan to come through and take second place. Fraga took his first non-sprint race victory to move past Iwasa and up to second in the standings, 48 points behind leader Ohta.

Fraga also took pole position for the second race of the weekend, this time ahead of Iwasa and O'Sullivan. He lost out to Iwasa at the start before Ohta also got by him on lap four. Ohta stopped on lap 17, but collided with Oyu, who had stopped earlier and tried undercutting him. That allowed Fraga to get back past him when he stopped a lap later. Ohta aggressively attacked Fraga and caused another collision, this time forcing him into retirement and heavily damaging Fraga's car. Under the ensuing safety car, four cars collided in the pit lane when Fukuzumi was sent out in the path of Browning and the latter had to brake and was rear-ended by two cars. Iwasa retained his lead, while Matsushita and O'Sullivan rose up the order to second and third. O'Sullivan managed to take second late on as Iwasa won to remain in championship contention, 32.5 points behind Ohta.

== Championship standings ==
=== Scoring system ===
Race points

Position	**1st**	**2nd**	**3rd**	**4th**	**5th**	**6th**	**7th**	**8th**	**9th**	**10th**
Points	20	15	11	8	6	5	4	3	2	1

The race at Autopolis was postponed to the first Fuji race weekend due to adverse weather conditions. This race, shortened to 25 laps, awarded reduced points:

Position	**1st**	**2nd**	**3rd**	**4th**	**5th**	**6th**	**7th**	**8th**	**9th**
Points	12	9	7	6	5	4	3	2	1

Qualifying points

Position	**1st**	**2nd**	**3rd**
Points	3	2	1

=== Drivers' championship ===
Pos	Driver	MOT		SUZ1		FUJ1			SUG	FUJ2		SUZ2		Pts
Pos	Driver	R1 (Note: Less than 75% of the scheduled race distance was completed due to disruptions caused by rain. Therefore, half points were awarded.)	R2	R4	R5	R6	R3	R7	R8	R9	R10	R11	R12	Pts
1	(Japan) Kakunoshin Ohta	1^{2}	**1**^{1}	7	3	1	8^{2}	1^{3}	4^{2}	2^{2}	Ret	2^{3}	2	153
2	(Japan) Ayumu Iwasa	**2**^{1}	8^{3}	**13**^{1}	2^{2}	10	**Ret**^{1}	5	2	4	1^{2}	**1**^{1}	3	123.5
3	(Brazil) Igor Omura Fraga	4	16	Ret	8	6	1	2	3^{3}	**1**^{1}	**15**^{1}	9	14	79
4	(Japan) Nirei Fukuzumi	19	3	10	**1**^{1}	23	19	8	1	6	11	17	4	71
5	(Japan) Tomoki Nojiri	8	18	Ret^{2}	11	24	2^{3}	**6**^{1}	**5**^{1}	15	7	3^{2}	**1**	67.5
6	(Japan) Tadasuke Makino	11	13	11	6^{3}	3	4	3^{2}	6	11	6	4	5	60
7	(United Kingdom) Zak O'Sullivan	Ret	6	9	20	**2**^{1}	16	15	9	3	2^{3}			54
8	(Japan) Toshiki Oyu	14	5^{2}	6	17	4^{2}	6	7	15	7	4	6	9	50
9	(Argentina) Sacha Fenestraz	6	Ret	1	7	11	5	13	8	13	5	8	20	43.5
10	(Japan) Sho Tsuboi	9	14	3	5	15	3	4	7	5	Ret	13	19	43
11	(Japan) Sena Sakaguchi	12	2	12	4	7	Ret	11	Ret	WD	WD	10	8	31
12	(Japan) Nobuharu Matsushita	16	10	2	12	17	17	16	16	19	3	Ret	Ret	27
13	(United Kingdom) Luke Browning	20	4	4	14	8^{3}	10	17	11	14	Ret	14	7	24
14	(Japan) Kamui Kobayashi	Ret	12	17	10	12	12	9	12	9	14	5	6	16
15	(Japan) Syun Koide	5	9	18	18	5	11	12	13	23	Ret	7	Ret	15
16	(Japan) Ren Sato	3^{3}	11	Ret	9	13	9	Ret	10	10	12	Ret	10	12.5
17	(Austria) Charlie Wurz	15	20	5	22	21	15	18	18	18	8	12	13	9
18	(Japan) Rikuto Kobayashi	18	Ret	16	23	19	7	20	21	8	Ret	16	17	6
19	(Japan) Yuto Nomura	7	15	15^{3}	13	9	14	14	20	Ret^{3}	Ret	Ret	12	6
20	(Japan) Kenta Yamashita	13	7	Ret	16	14	13	10	14	12	Ret	11	11	5
21	(Czech Republic) Roman Staněk	10	17	8	15	16	21	19	Ret	17	10	15	15	4.5
22	(France) Giuliano Alesi					18		Ret	19	16	9	19	16	2
23	(Japan) "Juju"	Ret	22	14	21	22	Ret	NC	17	22	13	18	21	0
24	(Japan) Kazuhisa Urabe									21	16			0
25	(Japan) Seita Nonaka	17	19	Ret	19		18							0
26	(Japan) Ukyo Sasahara	Ret	21	Ret	Ret	20	20	21	Ret	20	Ret	20	18	0
—	(Japan) Tokiya Suzuki											Ret	Ret	0
Pos	Driver	R1	R2	R4	R5	R6	R3	R7	R8	R9	R10	R11	R12	Pts
Pos	Driver	MOT		SUZ1		FUJ1			SUG	FUJ2		SUZ2		Pts

Key
Colour	Result
Gold	Winner
Silver	Second place
Bronze	Third place
Green	Other points position
Blue	Other classified position
Blue	Not classified, finished (NC)
Purple	Not classified, retired (Ret)
Red	Did not qualify (DNQ)
Red	Did not pre-qualify (DNPQ)
Black	Disqualified (DSQ)
White	Did not start (DNS)
White	Race cancelled (C)
Blank	Did not practice (DNP)
Blank	Excluded (EX)
Blank	Did not arrive (DNA)
Blank	Withdrawn (WD)
Blank	Did not enter (cell empty)
Text formatting	Meaning
**Bold**	Pole position
Italics	Fastest lap

=== Teams' championship ===
Pos	Driver	MOT		SUZ1		FUJ1			SUG	FUJ2		SUZ2		Pts
Pos	Driver	R1	R2	R4	R5	R6	R3	R7	R8	R9	R10	R11	R12	Pts
1	(Japan) Docomo Team Dandelion Racing	1	1	7	3	1	4	1	4	2	6	2	2	197
1	(Japan) Docomo Team Dandelion Racing	11	13	11	6	3	8	3	6	11	Ret	4	5	197
2	(Japan) Team Mugen Autobacs	2	8	13	2	10	2	5	2	4	1	1	1	163
2	(Japan) Team Mugen Autobacs	8	18	Ret	11	24	Ret	6	5	15	7	3	3	163
3	(Japan) Vantelin Team TOM'S	6	14	1	5	11	3	4	7	5	5	8	19	86.5
3	(Japan) Vantelin Team TOM'S	9	Ret	3	7	15	5	13	8	13	Ret	13	20	86.5
4	(Japan) Ponos Nakajima Racing	3	11	Ret	8	6	1	2	3	1	12	9	10	83.5
4	(Japan) Ponos Nakajima Racing	4	16	Ret	9	13	9	Ret	10	10	15	Ret	14	83.5
5	(Japan) Sanki Vertex Partners Cerumo・Inging	12	2	6	4	4	6	7	15	7	4	6	8	77
5	(Japan) Sanki Vertex Partners Cerumo・Inging	14	5	12	17	7	Ret	11	Ret	21	16	10	9	77
6	(Japan) NTT Docomo Business Rookie	19	3	10	1	23	19	8	1	6	11	17	4	68
7	(Japan) Team Impul	Ret	6	9	20	2	16	15	9	3	2	Ret	Ret	50
8	(Japan) Delightworks Racing	16	10	2	12	17	17	16	16	19	3	Ret	Ret	27
9	(Japan) Realize Kondo Racing	20	4	4	14	8	10	17	11	14	Ret	14	7	23
9	(Japan) Realize Kondo Racing	Ret	21	Ret	Ret	20	20	21	Ret	20	Ret	20	18	23
10	(Japan) KDDI TGMGP TGR-DC	18	12	16	10	12	7	9	12	8	14	5	6	22
10	(Japan) KDDI TGMGP TGR-DC	Ret	Ret	17	23	19	12	20	21	9	Ret	16	17	22
11	(Japan) ThreeBond Racing	5	9	18	18	5	11	12	13	23	Ret	7	Ret	15
12	(Japan) Team Goh	15	20	5	22	21	15	18	18	18	8	12	13	9
13	(Hong Kong) KCMG	13	7	Ret	16	14	13	10	14	12	9	11	11	7
13	(Hong Kong) KCMG	17	19	Ret	19	18	18	Ret	19	16	Ret	19	16	7
14	(Japan) Navikuru Buzz MK Racing	10	17	8	15	16	21	19	Ret	17	10	15	16	4.5
15	(Japan) San-Ei Gen with B-Max	7	15	15	13	9	14	14	20	Ret	Ret	Ret	12	4
16	(Japan) Hazama Ando Triple Tree Racing	Ret	22	14	21	22	Ret	NC	17	22	13	18	21	0
Pos	Driver	R1	R2	R4	R5	R6	R3	R7	R8	R9	R10	R11	R12	Pts
Pos	Driver	MOT		SUZ1		FUJ1			SUG	FUJ2		SUZ2		Pts
