= Tosei Moriyama =

Japanese racing driver

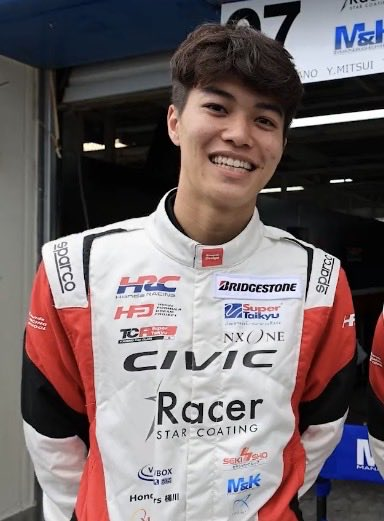
- Moriyama in 2023
- Nationality: (Japan) Japanese
- Born: 10 January 2003 (age 23) Osaka, Japan

Previous series
- 2024 2023–25: FIA Motorsport Games Formula 4 Cup; F4 Japanese Championship

Tosei Moriyama (森山 冬星, Moriyama Tosei; born 10 January 2003) is a Japanese racing driver.

== Career ==
=== Formula 4 ===
Moriyama won the HRS Suzuka School Scholarship, with that he got a full time seat in the F4 Japanese Championship for 2023 with Honda Formula Dream Project. He was paired with the 2022 runners up Yusuke Mitsui, and French F4 Championship driver Yuto Nomura. He only managed to get fifth in the standings. After that, he got dropped from Honda. In that year as well, Moriyama competed in Super Taikyu ST-TCR class with M&K Racing for two rounds alongside Mitsuhiro Endo & Shinji Nakano.

For 2024, Moriyama continued to race in F4 Japan, as he moved to HELM Motorsports. He won his first race in Suzuka race 2. Moriyama was picked by the JAF, and Super GT to compete in the 2024 FIA Motorsport Games Formula 4 Cup.

In 2025, Moriyama continued to compete in the series for his third season, this time with B-Max Racing Team.

=== Super Formula Lights ===
Moriyama made his debut in Super Formula Lights in 2025, replacing Nobuhiro Imada who suffered a hand injury before the opening round of the season.

== Racing record ==
=== Career summary ===
Season	Series	Team	Races	Wins	Poles	FLaps	Podiums	Points	Position
2023	F4 Japanese Championship	Honda Formula Dream Project	14	0	0	0	2	101	5th
2023	Super Taikyu - ST-TCR	M&K Racing	2	1	1	1	1	88‡	**1st‡**
2024	F4 Japanese Championship	HELM Motorsports	14	1	1	2	4	99	5th
2024	FIA Motorsport Games Formula 4 Cup	Team Japan	2	0	0	0	0	N/A	5th
2025	F4 Japanese Championship	B-Max Racing Team	14	0	1	1	3	88	8th
2025	Super Formula Lights	JMS Racing Team	3	0	0	0	0	0	12th
2026	Formula Regional Japanese Championship	Rn-sports	2	0	0	0	0	20	15th

^{*} Season still in progress.
‡ Team standings

=== Complete F4 Japanese Championship results ===
(key) (Races in bold indicate pole position) (Races in italics indicate fastest lap)

Year	Team	1	2	3	4	5	6	7	8	9	10	11	12	13	14	DC	Pts
2023	Honda Formula Dream Project	FUJ1; 1; 9	FUJ1; 2; 5	SUZ; 1; 4	SUZ; 2; 2	FUJ2; 1; 5	FUJ2; 2; 6	SUZ2; 1 Ret	SUZ2; 2; 9	SUG; 1; 5	SUG; 2; 3	AUT; 1; 7	AUT; 2; 6	MOT; 1; 11	MOT; 2 Ret	5th	101
2024	HELM Motorsports	FUJ1; 1; 15	**FUJ1**; **2**; **1**	SUZ; 1; 4	SUZ; 2; 2	FUJ2; 1; 2	FUJ2; 2; 11	SUG; 1; 10	SUG; 2; 9	AUT; 1 Ret	MOT; 1; 15	MOT; 2 Ret	MOT; 3; 11	SUZ2; 1; 5	SUZ2; 2; 3	5th	99
2025	B-Max Racing Team	FUJ1; 1; 3	FUJ1; 2; 4	FUJ1; 3; 2	FUJ2; 1; 6	FUJ2; 2; 6	SUZ; 1; 16	SUZ; 2; 14	SUG; 1; 16	SUG; 2; 13	SUG; 3; 20	AUT; 1; 5	**AUT**; **2**; 2	MOT; 1; 9	MOT; 2; 12	8th	88

=== Complete FIA Motorsport Games results ===
Year	Entrant	Cup	Qualifying	Quali Race	Main race
2024	Team Japan	**Formula 4**	8th	8th	5th

=== Complete Super Formula Lights results ===
(key) (Races in bold indicate pole position) (Races in italics indicate fastest lap)

Year	Entrant	1	2	3	4	5	6	7	8	9	10	11	12	13	14	15	16	17	18	Pos	Points
2025	JMS Racing Team	SUZ; 1; 7	SUZ; 2; 10	SUZ; 3; 8	AUT; 1	AUT; 2	OKA; 1	OKA; 2	OKA; 3	SUG; 1	SUG; 2	SUG; 3	SUG; 4	FUJ; 1	FUJ; 2	FUJ; 3	MOT; 1	MOT; 2	MOT; 3	12th	0

^{*} Season still in progress.

=== Complete Formula Regional Japanese Championship results ===
(key) (Races in bold indicate pole position) (Races in italics indicate fastest lap)

Year	Entrant	1	2	3	4	5	6	7	8	9	10	11	12	13	14	Pos	Points
2026	Rn-sports	SUZ1; 1	SUZ1; 2	SUZ1; 3	SUZ2; 1	SUZ2; 2	MOT; 1	MOT; 2	SUG; 1	SUG; 2	SUG; 3	FUJ1; 1	FUJ1; 2	FUJ2; 1; 6	FUJ2; 2; 4	15th	20
