= B-Max Racing Team =

Japanese racing team

B-Max Racing
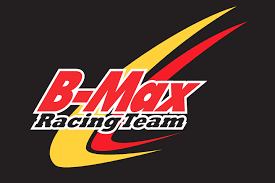
- Founded: 2010 (as a racing team); November 3, 2017; 8 years ago (as a company)
- Base: Ayase, Kanagawa
- Founder(s): Ryūji Kumita
- Current series: Super Formula; Super Formula Lights; F4 Japanese Championship
- Former series: Japanese Formula 3 Championship; F3 Asian Championship; Formula Regional Japanese Championship; GT World Challenge Asia
- Current drivers: Super Formula: (Japan) Iori Kimura; Super Formula Lights: (United States) Kaylen Frederick; (Japan) Syun Koide; (Japan) Nobuhiro Imada; (Japan) "Dragon"; (Japan) Makoto Fujiwara; (Japan) Yasuhiro Shimizu; (Japan) Rin Arakawa; F4 Japanese Championship: (Japan) Ryota Horachi; (Japan) Yuto Nomura

B-Max Racing Co., Ltd also known as B-Max Racing Team and B-Max Engineering is a Japanese race car constructor and racing team headquartered in Ayase, Kanagawa, Japan.

== History ==
Byobugaura Kogyo Co., Ltd. established the race division "B-Max Engineering" in 2009, and started participating in Super FJ and Porsche Carrera Cup Japan in 2010. Since then, the participation category has been expanded. Ryūji Kumita, the president and team representative, competes in the race himself under the pseudonym "Dragon".

In 2014, the team name was changed to "B-Max Racing Team" (Vehicle Division). In addition, B-Max Racing participate in the Japanese Formula 3 Championship. In November 2017, spun off from Byobugaura Kogyo Co., Ltd. as B-MAX RACING Co., Ltd.

=== Super Formula ===
The team have also participated in Super Formula Championship from 2017 with Takashi Kogure their first driver. In 2019, they participated in Super Formula with two cars, in collaboration with the German racing team Motopark Academy. For 2021, B-Max & Motopark ended their partnership, and the team did not race for first round of the season. Nobuharu Matsushita: joined B-Max Racing from the second round at Suzuka. He was initially denied an engine lease from Honda, after signing a factory racing contract with Nissan in the Super GT Series. This prevented him from racing in the opening round at Fuji. Honda would reverse their decision after Masaya Nagai replaced Hiroshi Shimizu as the Director of Motorsport at Honda. They planned to enter two cars, after running just one car for Nobuharu Matsushita in 2021. They confirmed on 4 March that they would continue to run one car, after a failed attempt to enter a non-Japanese driver in their second car, as 2021 Formula Regional Americas Championship champion Kyffin Simpson declined the opportunity offered by Honda Performance Development (Honda's United States motorsport operation, which supplies engines to the Formula 4 United States and Formula Regional Americas championships) to the series champion because of pandemic-related restrictions. Raoul Hyman was awarded a Honda Super Formula scholarship for winning the 2022 Formula Regional Americas Championship title, and drove for B-Max Racing. The team is currently scheduled to downsize from running two cars in 2023 to a single-car entry in 2024, to be piloted by reigning Super Formula Lights champion Iori Kimura.

=== Super GT ===
B-Max Racing venture in Super GT started in 2014 where they are set up with NDDP Racing which is the NISMO Nissan Driver Academy as they discontinued their partnership with Nova Engineering. Kazuki Hoshino as the leading senior driver, he has partnered up with Lucas Ordóñez, and Jann Mardenborough who won the Nissan Gran Turismo Academy. Mitsunori Takaboshi raced as well for two seasons.

In 2018 NDDP Racing moved up to the GT500 class, entering as NDDP Racing with B-Max. They take the place of MOLA, who withdrew from the series at the end of 2017. B-Max formed an all-new driver lineup: Kohei Hirate transferred to Nissan and secured his return to GT500 after a seventeen-year association with Toyota, while former Honda GT500 driver Frédéric Makowiecki returned to the series for the first time since 2014. For 2020 Katsumasa Chiyo, who raced full-time in the Intercontinental GT Challenge for Nissan in 2019, returns to GT500 on a full-time basis at NDDP Racing with B-Max, replacing Makowiecki. In 2022, NISMO takes over the NDDP Team, thus ends B-Max Racing program in Super GT.

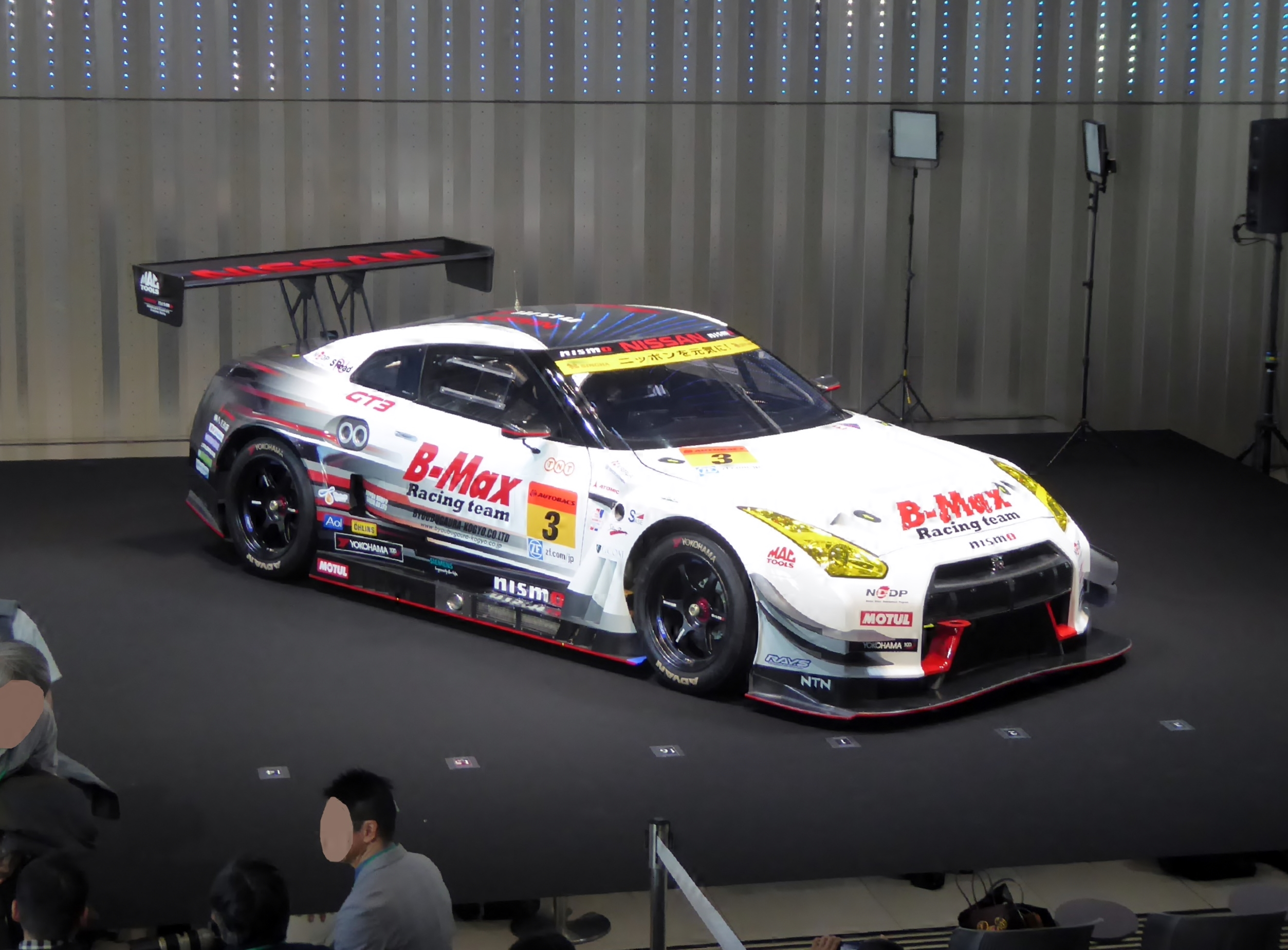
B-MAX NDDP GT-R in 2017.

== Current series results ==
=== Super Formula ===
Year	Chassis	Engine	Drivers	Races	Wins	Poles	F/Laps	Podiums	Points	D.C.	T.C.	Pts
2017	Dallara SF14	Honda HR-414E I4 t	(Japan) Takashi Kogure	7	0	0	0	0	0	18th	11th	0
2018	Dallara SF14	Honda HR-414E I4 t	(Japan) Katsumasa Chiyo	6	0	0	0	0	0	18th	11th	0
2019	Dallara SF19	Honda HR-417E I4 t	(Austria) Lucas Auer	7	0	0	1	1	14	9th	8th	20
2019	Dallara SF19	Honda HR-417E I4 t	(United Kingdom) Harrison Newey	7	0	0	0	1	6	15th	8th	20
2020	Dallara SF19	Honda HR-417E I4 t	(Japan) Nobuharu Matsushita	4	0	0	0	1	16	15th	9th	16
2020	Dallara SF19	Honda HR-417E I4 t	(Brazil) Sérgio Sette Câmara	1	0	1	0	0	3	20th	9th	16
2020	Dallara SF19	Honda HR-417E I4 t	(France) Charles Milesi	3	0	0	0	0	0	21st	9th	16
2020	Dallara SF19	Honda HR-417E I4 t	(Japan) Mitsunori Takaboshi	1	0	0	0	0	0	26th	9th	16
2020	Dallara SF19	Honda HR-417E I4 t	(Japan) Teppei Natori	0	0	0	0	0	0	NC	9th	16
2021	Dallara SF19	Honda HR-417E I4 t	(Japan) Nobuharu Matsushita	6	0	1	0	2	33.5	8th	8th	29.5
2022	Dallara SF19	Honda HR-417E I4 t	(Japan) Nobuharu Matsushita	10	1	0	0	1	21	13th	9th	21
2023	Dallara SF23	Honda HR-417E I4 t	(Japan) Nobuharu Matsushita	9	0	0	0	0	4	19th	12th	4
2023	Dallara SF23	Honda HR-417E I4 t	(United Kingdom) Raoul Hyman	9	0	0	0	0	0	25th	12th	4
2024	Dallara SF23	Honda HR-417E I4 t	(Japan) Iori Kimura	9	0	0	1	0	3	16th	10th	3
2025	Dallara SF23	Honda HR-417E I4 t	(Japan) Syun Koide	12	0	0	0	0	5	16th	9th	5

==== In detail ====
(key) (Races in bold indicate pole position) (Races in italics indicate fastest lap)

Year	Drivers	1	2	3	4	5	6	7	8	9	10	T.C.	Points
2017		SUZ	OKA	OKA	FUJ	MOT	AUT	SUG	SUZ	SUZ		11th	0
2017	(Japan) Takashi Kogure	15	18	15	13	17	12	14	C	C		11th	0
2018		SUZ	AUT	SUG	FUJ	MOT	OKA	SUZ				11th	0
2018	(Japan) Katsumasa Chiyo	14	C	Ret	17	19	15	10				11th	0
2019		SUZ	AUT	SUG	FUJ	MOT	OKA	SUZ				8th	20
2019	(Austria) Lucas Auer	7	11	3	Ret	7	5	11				8th	20
2019	(United Kingdom) Harrison Newey	Ret	17	Ret	16	19	3	20				8th	20
2020		MOT	OKA	SUG	AUT	SUZ	SUZ	FUJ				9th	16
2020	(Japan) Teppei Natori	DNS										9th	16
2020	(Japan) Mitsunori Takaboshi		14									9th	16
2020	(Brazil) Sérgio Sette Câmara			**Ret**								9th	16
2020	(Japan) Nobuharu Matsushita				6	Ret	14	3				9th	16
2020	(France) Charles Milesi				15	11	13	DNS				9th	16
2021		FUJ	SUZ	AUT	SUG	MOT	MOT	SUZ				8th	29.5
2021	(Japan) Nobuharu Matsushita		13	3‡	4	3	7	**12**				8th	29.5
2022		FUJ	FUJ	SUZ	AUT	SUG	FUJ	MOT	MOT	SUZ	SUZ	9th	21
2022	(Japan) Nobuharu Matsushita	Ret	19	1	10	Ret	Ret	11	11	17	Ret	9th	21
2023		FUJ	FUJ	SUZ	AUT	SUG	FUJ	MOT	SUZ	SUZ		12th	4
2023	(Japan) Nobuharu Matsushita	13	12	12	Ret	Ret	13	Ret	13	7		12th	4
2023	(United Kingdom) Raoul Hyman	16	18	18	17	18	Ret	15	21	18		12th	4

=== Super Formula Lights ===
Year	Car	Drivers	Races	Wins	Poles	F/Laps	Podiums	Points	D.C.	T.C.
2020	Dallara 320-Volkswagen	(Japan) Sena Sakaguchi	17	4	5	2	16	116	**2nd**	N/A
2020	Dallara 320-Volkswagen	(Japan) Yoshiaki Katayama	5	0	0	0	1	10	6th	N/A
2020	Dallara 320-Volkswagen	(Japan) Mitsunori Takaboshi	3	0	0	0	0	8	7th	N/A
2020	Dallara 320-Volkswagen	(Japan) Mizuki Ishizaka	2	0	0	0	0	3	11th	N/A
2020	Dallara 320-Volkswagen	(Japan) "Dragon"	17	0	0	0	0	2	12th	N/A
2020	Dallara 320-Volkswagen	(Japan) Kiyoto Fujinami	3	0	0	0	0	2	13th	N/A
2020	Dallara 320-Volkswagen	(Japan) Masami Kageyama	2	0	0	0	0	1	14th	N/A
2020	Dallara 320-Volkswagen	(Japan) Sakon Yamamoto	3	0	0	0	0	0	16th	N/A
2020	Dallara 320-Volkswagen	(Japan) Satoshi Motoyama	3	0	0	0	0	0	17th	N/A
2020	Dallara 320-Volkswagen	(Japan) Nobuhiro Imada	9	0	0	0	0	0	18th	N/A
2020	Dallara 320-Volkswagen	(Japan) Motoyoshi Yoshida	8	0	0	0	0	0	19th	N/A
2020	Dallara 320-Volkswagen	(Japan) Takashi Hata	6	0	0	0	0	0	20th	N/A
2021	Dallara 320-Spiess	(Japan) Nobuhiro Imada	17	0	0	0	0	1	10th	**2nd**
2021	Dallara 320-Spiess	(Japan) "Dragon"	17	0	0	0	0	0	12th	**2nd**
2021	Dallara 320-Spiess	(Japan) Miki Koyama	3	0	0	0	0	0	13th	**2nd**
2021	Dallara 320-Spiess	(Japan) "Syuji"	8	0	0	0	0	0	14th	**2nd**
2021	Dallara 320-Spiess	(Japan) Takashi Hata	6	0	0	0	0	0	17th	**2nd**
2022	Dallara 320-Spiess	(Japan) Iori Kimura	18	3	2	6	9	85	**3rd**	**3rd**
2022	Dallara 320-Spiess	(Japan) Togo Suganami	18	0	0	0	1	25	7th	**3rd**
2022	Dallara 320-Spiess	(Japan) "Dragon"	18	0	0	0	0	1	11th	**3rd**
2022	Dallara 320-Spiess	(Japan) Nobuhiro Imada	18	0	0	0	0	1	12th	**3rd**
2022	Dallara 320-Spiess	(Spain) Roberto Merhi	3	0	0	0	0	0	14th	**3rd**
2023	Dallara 320-Spiess	(Japan) Iori Kimura	18	6	4	8	12	113	**1st**	**1st**
2023	Dallara 320-Spiess	(Brazil) Igor Fraga	18	1	1	1	7	62	4th	**1st**
2023	Dallara 320-Spiess	(Japan) Togo Suganami	9	2	0	1	4	39	6th	**1st**
2023	Dallara 320-Spiess	(Spain) David Vidales	15	0	0	0	1	19	9th	**1st**
2023	Dallara 320-Spiess	(Japan) Nobuhiro Imada	15	0	0	0	0	0	12th	**1st**
2023	Dallara 320-Spiess	(Japan) Takashi Hata	10	0	0	0	0	0	14th	**1st**
2023	Dallara 320-TOMEI	(Japan) "Dragon"	18	0	0	0	0	0	13th	**1st**
2024	Dallara 324-TOM'S	(Japan) Syun Koide	18	8	6	7	11	115	**1st**	**2nd**
2024	Dallara 324-TOM'S	(United States) Kaylen Frederick	18	1	1	0	4	46	5th	**2nd**
2024	Dallara 324-TOM'S	(Japan) Rin Arakawa	9	0	0	0	3	44	6th	**2nd**
2024	Dallara 324-TOM'S	(Japan) Rin Arakawa	6	0	0	0	2	44	6th	4th
2024	Dallara 324-TOM'S	(Japan) "Dragon"	18	0	0	0	0	0	11th	4th
2024	Dallara 324-TOM'S	(Japan) Makoto Fujiwara	12	0	0	0	0	0	14th	4th
2024	Dallara 324-TOM'S	(Japan) Nobuhiro Imada	14	0	0	0	0	0	10th	6th
2024	Dallara 324-TOM'S	(Japan) Togo Suganami	3	0	0	0	0	0	13th	6th
2024	Dallara 324-TOM'S	(Japan) Yasuhiro Shimizu	18	0	0	0	0	0	15th	8th
2025	Dallara 324-TOM'S	(Japan) Yuto Nomura	18	12	7	8	16	153	**1st**	**1st**
2025	Dallara 324-TOM'S	(United States) Kaylen Frederick	15	1	1	1	4	35	5th	**1st**
2025	Dallara 324-TOM'S	(Philippines) Zachary David	18	0	0	0	1	25	8th	**1st**
2025	Dallara 324-TOM'S	(Japan) Kazuhisa Urabe	18	0	0	1	0	5	10th	**1st**
2025	Dallara 324-TOM'S	(Japan) "Dragon"	18	0	0	0	0	0	18th	**1st**
2025	Dallara 324-TOM'S	(Japan) Keito Matsui	3	0	0	0	0	0	19th	**1st**
2025	Dallara 324-TOM'S	(Japan) Takuya Otaki	0	0	0	0	0	0	NC	**1st**
2025	Dallara 324-TOM'S	(Japan) Tosei Moriyama	3	0	0	0	0	0	12th	5th
2025	Dallara 324-TOM'S	(Japan) Nobuhiro Imada	12	0	0	0	0	0	15th	5th
2025	Dallara 324-TOM'S	(Japan) "Ken Alex"	3	0	0	0	0	0	14th	6th
2025	Dallara 324-TOM'S	(Japan) Yasuhiro Shimizu	18	0	0	0	0	0	16th	7th
2026	Dallara 324-TOM'S	(France) Evan Giltaire	18	6	2	4	15	110.5	**1st**	**2nd**
2026	Dallara 324-TOM'S	(Japan) Kotaro Shimbara	18	1	2	2	6	51	5th	**2nd**
2026	Dallara 324-TOM'S	(Japan) Rintaro Sato	15	0	0	0	0	17	9th	4th
2026	Dallara 324-TOM'S	(Japan) "Dragon"	18	0	0	0	0	0	13th	4th
2026	Dallara 324-TOM'S	(Japan) "Ken Alex"	18	0	0	0	0	0	12th	6th
2026	Dallara 324-TOM'S	(Japan) Daichi Okamoto	3	0	0	0	0	0	15th	6th
2026	Dallara 324-TOM'S	(Japan) Yasuhiro Shimizu	14	0	0	0	0	0	14th	7th
2026	Dallara 324-TOM'S	(Japan) Nobuhiro Imada	6	0	0	0	0	0	16th	8th

=== F4 Japanese Championship ===
Year	Car	Drivers	Races	Wins	Poles	F/Laps	Podiums	Points	D.C.	T.C.
2016	Dome F110	(Japan) Shinji Sawada	14	0	1	0	5	106	7th	5th
2016	Dome F110	(Japan) Motoyoshi Yoshida	12	0	0	0	0	0	38th	5th
2016	Dome F110	(Japan) "Syuji"	2	0	0	0	0	0	48th	5th
2017	Dome F110	(Japan) Shinji Sawada	14	0	0	0	2	85	6th	4th
2017	Dome F110	(Japan) Ayumu Iwasa	2	0	0	0	0	0	28th	4th
2017	Dome F110	(Malaysia) Chia Wing Hoong	14	0	0	0	0	0	31st	4th
2017	Dome F110	(Japan) Motoyoshi Yoshida	4	0	0	0	0	0	45th	4th
2018	Dome F110	(Japan) "Syuji"	8	0	0	0	0	0	40th	NC
2018	Dome F110	(Japan) Motoyoshi Yoshida	2	0	0	0	0	0	43rd	NC
2018	Dome F110	(Japan) "Dragon"	2	0	0	0	0	0	NC	NC
2019	Dome F110	(Japan) "Dragon"	12	0	0	0	0	0	22nd	NC
2019	Dome F110	(Japan) "Syuji"	14	0	0	0	0	0	39th	NC
2021	Dome F110	(Japan) Nobuhiro Imada	7	0	0	0	0	0	28th	NC
2021	Dome F110	(Japan) "Syuji"	7	0	0	0	0	0	42nd	NC
2022	Dome F110	(Japan) Yuki Mishima	4	0	0	0	0	2	21st	12th
2022	Dome F110	(Japan) "Dragon"	14	0	0	0	0	0	35th	12th
2022	Dome F110	(Japan) Nobuhiro Imada	3	0	0	0	0	0	46th	12th
2023	Dome F110	(Japan) Nobuhiro Imada	12	0	0	0	0	0	37th	NC
2023	Dome F110	(Japan) "Dragon"	14	0	0	0	0	0	40th	NC
2023	Dome F110	(Japan) Makoto Fujiwara	14	0	0	0	0	0	36th	NC
2024	Toray Carbon Magic MCSC-24	(Japan) "Dragon"	13	5	5	4	9	202	**1st**	**1st** (Note: Independent class)
2024	Toray Carbon Magic MCSC-24	(Japan) Nobuhiro Imada	12	4	4	1	10	199.5	**2nd**	**1st**
2024	Toray Carbon Magic MCSC-24	(Japan) Yuto Nomura	13	7	3	4	10	236	**1st**	**1st**
2024	Toray Carbon Magic MCSC-24	(Japan) Ryota Horachi	13	1	6	4	8	167	**2nd**	**1st**
2025	Toray Carbon Magic MCSC-24	(Japan) Nobuhiro Imada	14	2	0	1	11	226	**1st**	**1st** (Note: Independent class)
2025	Toray Carbon Magic MCSC-24	(Japan) "Dragon"	14	4	3	3	9	190.5	**3rd**	**1st**
2025	Toray Carbon Magic MCSC-24	(Japan) Yasuhiro Shimizu	4	1	0	0	2	55	10th	**1st**
2025	Toray Carbon Magic MCSC-24	(Japan) Kazutaka Miura	7	0	0	1	0	2	19th	**1st**
2025	Toray Carbon Magic MCSC-24	(Japan) Kotaro Shimbara	14	2	3	1	5	127	4th	**3rd**
2025	Toray Carbon Magic MCSC-24	(Japan) Syo Momose	14	0	0	0	2	96	6th	**3rd**
2025	Toray Carbon Magic MCSC-24	(Japan) Tosei Moriyama	14	0	1	1	3	88	8th	5th
2025	Toray Carbon Magic MCSC-24	(Japan) Ayato Iwasaki	14	0	0	0	0	23	14th	5th
2026	Toray Carbon Magic MCSC-24	(Japan) Haruto Nakai								
2026	Toray Carbon Magic MCSC-24	(Japan) Ryoki Minoura								
2026	Toray Carbon Magic MCSC-24	(Japan) Syo Momose								
2026	Toray Carbon Magic MCSC-24	(Japan) Kazuma Kurosawa								
2026	Toray Carbon Magic MCSC-24	(Japan) "Dragon"								
2026	Toray Carbon Magic MCSC-24	(Japan) Nobuhiro Imada								
2026	Toray Carbon Magic MCSC-24	(Japan) Yasuhiro Shimizu								
2026	Toray Carbon Magic MCSC-24	(Japan) "Syuji"								

=== Formula Regional Japanese Championship ===
Year	Car	Drivers	Races	Wins	Poles	F/Laps	Podiums	Points	D.C.	T.C.
2020	Dome F111/3	(Japan) "Dragon"	11	0	0	0	0	76	6th	4th
2020	Dome F111/3	(Japan) "Syuji"	12	0	0	0	0	41	10th	4th
2020	Dome F111/3	(Japan) Motoyoshi Yoshida	5	0	0	0	0	0	22nd	4th
2021	Dome F111/3	(Japan) Nobuhiro Imada	10	0	0	0	0	54	10th	5th
2021	Dome F111/3	(Japan) "Takumi"	13	0	0	0	0	44	11th	5th
2021	Dome F111/3	(Japan) "Dragon"	10	0	0	0	0	20	18th	5th
2021	Dome F111/3	(Japan) "Syuji"	8	0	0	0	0	10	19th	5th
2022	Dome F111/3	(Japan) Nobuhiro Imada	5	0	0	0	0	40	11th	9th
2025	Dome F111/3	(Japan) Kazuhisa Urabe	12	3	1	0	10	187	**3rd**	**2nd**
2025	Dome F111/3	(China) Jia Zhanbin	15	0	0	1	0	65	9th	**2nd**

== Former series results ==
=== Super GT ===
(key) (Races in bold indicate pole position) (Races in italics indicate fastest lap)

Year	Car	Class	No.	Drivers	1	2	3	4	5	6	7	8	9	Pos	Points
2012	Nissan GT-R	GT300	3	(Japan) Yuhi Sekiguchi (Japan) Katsumasa Chiyo (Japan) Daiki Sasaki	OKA; 19	FUJ; 18	SEP; 4	SUG; 1	SUZ; 2	FUJ; 9	AUT; 19	MOT; 6		4th	53
2013	Nissan GT-R	GT300	3	(Japan) Kazuki Hoshino (Japan) Daiki Sasaki (Spain) Lucas Ordóñez	OKA; Ret	FUJ; Ret	SEP; 10	SUG; 9	SUZ; 9	FUJ; 5	FUJ	AUT; Ret	MOT; 9	17th	14
2014	Nissan GT-R	GT300	3	(Japan) Kazuki Hoshino (Spain) Lucas Ordóñez (Belgium) Wolfgang Reip	OKA; 4	FUJ; 5	AUT; 4	SUG; 9	FUJ; 10	SUZ; 19	BUR; 1	MOT; 8		4th	48
2015	Nissan GT-R	GT300	3	(Japan) Kazuki Hoshino (Japan) Mitsunori Takaboshi (Belgium) Wolfgang Reip	OKA; 8	FUJ; 2	CHA; 1	FUJ; Ret	SUZ; 14	SUG; 8	AUT; 1	MOT; Ret		4th	61
2016	Nissan GT-R	GT300	3	(Japan) Kazuki Hoshino (United Kingdom) Jann Mardenborough	OKA; 10	FUJ; 1	SUG; 5	FUJ; 6	SUZ; 10	CHA; 2	MOT; 13	MOT; 6		4th	52
2017	Nissan GT-R	GT300	3	(Japan) Kazuki Hoshino (Japan) Mitsunori Takaboshi	OKA; 7	FUJ; 6	AUT; 9	SUG; 8	FUJ; Ret	SUZ; 14	CHA; 9	MOT; 10		17th	17
2018	Nissan GT-R	GT500	3	(Japan) Satoshi Motoyama (Japan) Katsumasa Chiyo	OKA; 7	FUJ; 10	SUZ; 7	CHA; 13	FUJ; 15	SUG; 8	AUT; 13	MOT; 9		17th	14
2019	Nissan GT-R	GT500	3	(Japan) Kohei Hirate (France) Frederic Makowiecki	OKA; 4‡	FUJ; 6	SUZ; 9	CHA; 6	FUJ; 11	AUT; 11	SUG; 1	MOT; DNS		9th	36
2020	Nissan GT-R	GT500	3	(Japan) Kohei Hirate (Japan) Katsumasa Chiyo	FUJ; 7	FUJ; 8	SUZ; 6	MOT; 7	FUJ; Ret	SUZ; 4	MOT; 15	FUJ; 6		13th	29
2021	Nissan GT-R	GT500	3	(Japan) Kohei Hirate (Japan) Katsumasa Chiyo	OKA; 9	FUJ; 5	MOT; 6	SUZ; 2	SUG; Ret	AUT; 4	MOT; 14	FUJ; 8		10th	39

^{‡} Half points awarded as less than 75% of race distance was completed.

=== F3 Asian Championship ===
Year	Car	Drivers	Races	Wins	Poles	F/Laps	Podiums	Points	D.C.	T.C.
2018	Tatuus F3 T-318	(Japan) "Dragon"	9	0	0	0	0	0	23rd	11th
2018	Tatuus F3 T-318	(Japan) Tairoku Yamaguchi	3	0	0	0	0	0	24th	11th
2019 Summer	Tatuus F3 T-318	(Japan) Miki Koyama†	6	0	0	0	0	18	15th	9th
2019 Summer	Tatuus F3 T-318	(Japan) Kiyoto Fujinami	3	0	0	0	0	14	16th	9th
2019 Summer	Tatuus F3 T-318	(Japan) "Dragon"	3	0	0	0	0	0	21st	9th
2019 Summer	Tatuus F3 T-318	(Japan) Tairoku Yamaguchi	3	0	0	0	0	0	22nd	9th
2019 Winter	Tatuus F3 T-318	(Japan) Motoyoshi Yoshida	6	0	0	0	0	11	14th	6th
2019 Winter	Tatuus F3 T-318	(Japan) Tairoku Yamaguchi	9	0	0	0	0	7	15th	6th
2019 Winter	Tatuus F3 T-318	(Japan) "Dragon"	3	0	0	0	0	0	16th	6th
2019 Winter	Tatuus F3 T-318	(Japan) Miki Koyama	3	0	0	0	0	0	NC‡	6th

† Koyama drove for BlackArts Racing Team in round 3. ‡ Guest driver

=== Formula 4 South East Asia Championship ===
Year	Car	Drivers	Races	Wins	Poles	F.Laps	Podiums	Points	D.C.	T.C.
2023	Tatuus F4-T421	(Japan) "Dragon"	3	0	0	0	0	2	27th	10th

== Timeline ==
Current series
F4 Japanese Championship	2016–2019, 2021–present
Super Formula Championship	2017–present
Super Formula Lights	2020–present
Formula Regional Japanese Championship	2020–2022, 2025–present
SRO Japan Cup	2025–present
Former Series
Japanese Formula 3 Championship	2011–2019
Super GT	2012–2021
Formula Challenge Japan	2013
Super Taikyu Series	2018
F3 Asian Championship	2018–2019
Formula 4 South East Asia Championship	2023
