= Yugo Iwasawa =

Japanese racing driver (born 2001)

- Nationality: (Japan) Japanese
- Born: 14 December 2001 (age 24) Kanagawa, Japan

Previous series
- 2023 2023-24 2020-2022: Super GT - GT300; Formula Regional Japanese Championship; F4 Japanese Championship

Yugo Iwasawa (岩澤 優吾, Iwasawa Yugo; born 14 December 2001) is a Japanese racing driver who last competed in the 2025 Super Formula Lights for Delightworks Racing.

== Career ==
=== Formula 4 ===
Iwasawa started his F4 career in 2020 with Rn-Sports. Iwasawa moved to Bionic Jack Racing, as he raced with them until 2022.

=== Formula Regional Japanese Championship ===
Iwasawa competed in Formula Regional Japanese Championship with Bionic Jack Racing. He competed for 3 rounds and got 3 podiums

=== Super GT ===
Iwasawa competed in the Super GT of 2023, with the new team Yogibo Racing alongside F4 driver Reimei Ito. Iwasawa did not continue to race as Yogibo Racing withdrew its entry for the 2024 season, citing a change in corporate strategy from the Yogibo brand.

== Racing record ==
=== Career summary ===
Season	Series	Team	Races	Wins	Poles	FLaps	Podiums	Points	Position
2020	F4 Japanese Championship	Rn-sports	12	0	0	0	0	3	19th
2021	F4 Japanese Championship	Bionic Jack Racing	14	0	0	0	0	34	12th
2022	F4 Japanese Championship	Bionic Jack Racing	14	0	0	1	2	125	5th
2023	Super GT - GT300	Yogibo Racing	8	0	0	0	0	10	20th
2023	Formula Regional Japanese Championship	Bionic Jack Racing	8	0	0	1	2	84.5	5th
2024	Super Taikyu - ST-Z	Porsche Team EBI							
2024	Formula Regional Japanese Championship	Delightworks Racing	2	0	0	0	1	27	13th
2025	Super Formula Lights	Delightworks Racing	5	0	0	0	0	0	17th
2026	TGR GR86/BRZ Cup	DTEC Team MASTER ONE							

=== Complete F4 Japanese Championship results ===
(key) (Races in bold indicate pole position) (Races in italics indicate fastest lap)

Year	Team	1	2	3	4	5	6	7	8	9	10	11	12	13	14	DC	Points
2020	Rn-sports	FUJ1; 1 Ret	FUJ1; 2 DNS	FUJ1; 3; 15	SUZ; 1; 11	SUZ; 2; 8	SUZ; 3; 13	MOT; 1; 24†	MOT; 2; 17	MOT; 3; 10	FUJ2; 1 Ret	FUJ2; 2 Ret	FUJ2; 3 DNS			19th	3
2021	Bionic Jack Racing	FUJ1; 1; 11	FUJ1; 2; 12	SUZ; 1; 8	SUZ; 2; 9	MOT1; 1; 10	MOT1; 2; 7	MOT1; 3; 9	SUG; 1 Ret	SUG; 2; 12	SUG; 3; 7	MOT2; 1 Ret	MOT2; 2; 5	FUJ2; 1; 9	FUJ2; 2; 10	12th	34
2022	Bionic Jack Racing	FUJ1; 1; 2	FUJ1; 2; 4	SUZ1; 1; 5	SUZ1; 2; 4	FUJ2; 1; 4	FUJ2; 2; 3	SUZ2; 1; 9	SUZ2; 2 Ret	SUG; 1; 12	SUG; 2; 5	AUT; 1; 6	AUT; 2; 4	MOT; 1; 6	MOT; 2; 7	5th	125

=== Complete Formula Regional Japanese Championship results ===
(key) (Races in bold indicate pole position) (Races in italics indicate fastest lap)

Year	Entrant	1	2	3	4	5	6	7	8	9	10	11	12	13	14	15	16	Pos	Points
2023	Bionic Jack Racing	FUJ1; 1; 5	FUJ1; 2; 4	FUJ1; 3; 4	SUZ; 1; 5	SUZ; 2; 3	OKA; 1; 2	OKA; 2; 5	OKA; 3; 5	MOT; 1	MOT; 2	MOT; 3	FUJ2; 1	FUJ2; 2	SUG; 1	SUG; 2	SUG; 3	5th	84.5
2024	Delightworks Racing	SUZ; 1	SUZ; 2	SUZ; 3	SUG; 1	SUG; 2	OKA; 1	OKA; 2	OKA; 3	MOT; 1	MOT; 2	FUJ1; 1	FUJ1; 2	FUJ2; 1; 3	FUJ2; 2; 4			13th	27

=== Complete Super GT results ===
Year	Team	Car	Class	1	2	3	4	5	6	7	8	DC	Points
2023	Yogibo Racing	Honda NSX GT3	GT300	OKA; 4	FUJ; 23†	SUZ; 7	FUJ; 10	SUZ; 9	SUG; 18	AUT; Ret	MOT; Ret	20th	10

=== Complete Super Formula Lights results ===
(key) (Races in bold indicate pole position) (Races in italics indicate fastest lap)

Year	Entrant	1	2	3	4	5	6	7	8	9	10	11	12	13	14	15	16	17	18	Pos	Points
2025	Delightworks Racing	SUZ; 1	SUZ; 2	SUZ; 3	AUT; 1; 10	AUT; 2; 14	OKA; 1; 10	OKA; 2; 11	OKA; 3; 10	SUG; 1	SUG; 2	SUG; 3	SUG; 4	FUJ; 1	FUJ; 2	FUJ; 3	MOT; 1	MOT; 2	MOT; 3	17th	0
