= Yuto Nomura =

Japanese racing driver (born 2005)

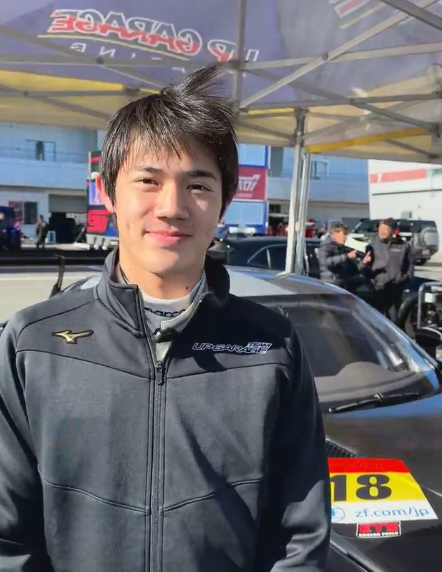
- Nomura in 2025
- Nationality: (Japan) Japanese
- Born: 12 November 2005 (age 20) Nagoya, Aichi, Japan

Super GT - GT500 career
- Debut season: 2026
- Current team: Real Racing
- Car number: 17
- Starts: 8
- Wins: 1
- Podiums: 2
- Poles: 1
- Fastest laps: 0
- Best finish: 2nd in 2026

Super Formula Championship career
- Debut season: 2026
- Current team: B-Max Racing
- Car number: 50
- Starts: 0
- Wins: 0
- Podiums: 0
- Poles: 0
- Fastest laps: 0
- Best finish: TBD in 2026

Previous series
- 2025 2025 2023–2024 2022: Super Formula Lights; Super GT - GT300; Formula 4 Japan; Formula 4 France

Championship titles
- 2025 2024: Super Formula Lights; F4 Japanese Championship

Yuto Nomura (野村勇斗, Nomura Yūto; born 12 November 2005) is a Japanese racing driver who currently competes in the Super Formula Championship for B-Max Racing. He has won back-to-back titles in Super Formula Lights and the F4 Japanese Championship in 2025 and 2024.

== Career ==
=== Formula 4 ===
Nomura made his formula racing debut in the French F4 Championship alongside his compatriot Souta Arao as part of winning the HRS Formula Scholarship. Nomura won two races and got two podiums, but only managed to rack up seventh in the standings. He was also a member of the Red Bull Junior Team for that season only. Nomura returned to Japan to compete in F4 Japanese Championship with Honda Formula Dream Project, alongside Yusuke Mitsui & Tosei Moriyama. He claimed fourth in the standings with one win and eight podiums. Nomura then raced in the same series, but moved to HFDP with B-Max Racing Team after the HFDP F4 team discontinued their running. Nomura won the title from his teammate Ryota Horachi, with seven wins to his name, as well as several podium finishes.

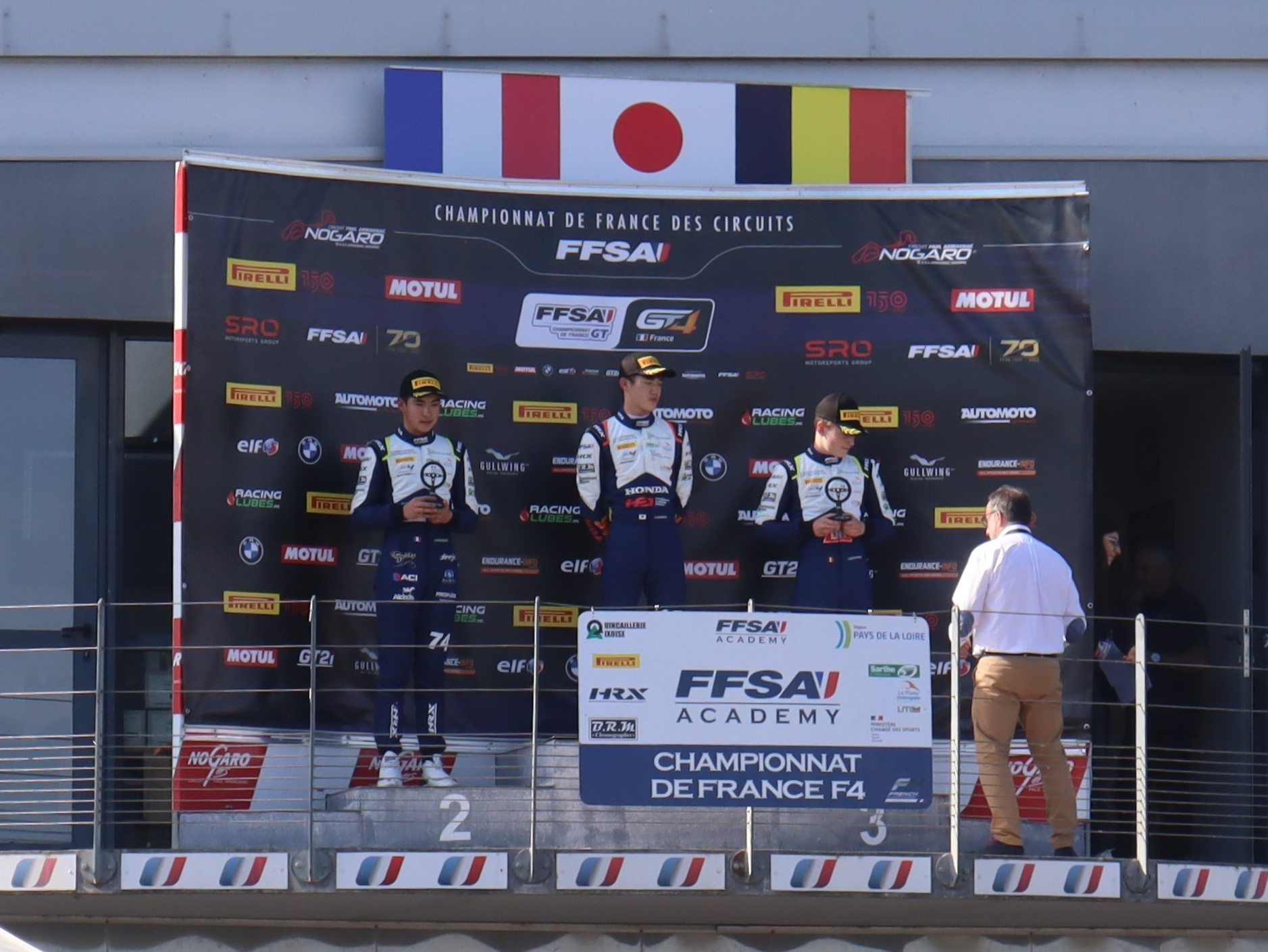
Nomura at Magny-Cours podium (middle).

=== Super Formula Lights ===
After winning the F4 Japan title, Nomura was promoted to Super Formula Lights with HFDP with B-Max Racing Team.

=== Super GT ===
==== GT300 ====
Nomura made his GT300 debut with Team UpGarage alongside Takashi Kobayashi in 2025.

== Racing record ==
=== Racing career summary ===
| Season | Series | Team | Races | Wins | Poles | F/Laps | Podiums | Points | Position |
|---|---|---|---|---|---|---|---|---|---|
| 2022 | French F4 Championship | FFSA Academy | 19 | 2 | 0 | 2 | 2 | 100 | 7th |
| 2023 | F4 Japanese Championship | Honda Formula Dream Project | 14 | 1 | 3 | 3 | 8 | 167 | 4th |
| 2024 | F4 Japanese Championship | HFDP with B-Max Racing Team | 13 | 7 | 3 | 4 | 10 | 236 | **1st** |
| 2025 | Super Formula Lights | B-Max Racing Team | 18 | 12 | 7 | 8 | 16 | 153 | **1st** |
| 2025 | Super GT - GT300 | Team UpGarage | 8 | 1 | 1 | 0 | 1 | 61.5 | 11th |
| 2025 | Super Taikyu - ST-Q | Team HRC | 3 | 2 | 3 | 0 | 2 | 0 | NC |
| 2026 | Super Formula | San-Ei Gen with B-Max | | | | | | | |
| 2026 | Super GT - GT500 | Astemo Real Racing | 8 | 1 | 1 | 0 | 2 | 65 | **2nd** |
| 2026 | Super Taikyu - ST-TCR | Hitonowa The Team Standard | | | | | | | |

=== Complete French F4 Championship results ===
(key) (Races in bold indicate pole position) (Races in italics indicate fastest lap)

| Year | 1 | 2 | 3 | 4 | 5 | 6 | 7 | 8 | 9 | 10 | 11 | 12 | 13 | 14 | 15 | 16 | 17 | 18 | 19 | 20 | 21 | Pos | Points |
|---|---|---|---|---|---|---|---|---|---|---|---|---|---|---|---|---|---|---|---|---|---|---|---|
| 2022 | NOG; 1; 7 | NOG; 2; 1 | NOG; 3; 10 | PAU; 1 Ret | PAU; 2 DNS | PAU; 3 DNS | MAG; 1; 9 | MAG; 2; 1 | MAG; 3 Ret | SPA; 1; 7 | SPA; 2; 10 | SPA; 3; 6 | LÉD; 1; 5 | LÉD; 2; 5 | LÉD; 3 Ret | CRT; 1 Ret | CRT; 2; 6 | CRT; 3; 4 | LEC; 1; 9 | LEC; 2; 7 | LEC; 3; 11 | 7th | 100 |

=== Complete F4 Japanese Championship results ===
| Year | Team | 1 | 2 | 3 | 4 | 5 | 6 | 7 | 8 | 9 | 10 | 11 | 12 | 13 | 14 | DC | Points |
|---|---|---|---|---|---|---|---|---|---|---|---|---|---|---|---|---|---|
| 2023 | Honda Formula Dream Project | FUJ1; 2 Ret | FUJ1; 1; 2 | **SUZ1**; **1**; 3 | **SUZ1**; **2**; 3 | FUJ2; 1; 2 | FUJ2; 2; 3 | **SUZ2**; **1**; 3 | **SUZ2**; **2**; 2 | SUG; 1; 1 | SUG; 2; 24 | AUT; 1; 6 | AUT; 2; 5 | MOT; 1 Ret | MOT; 2; 5 | 4th | 167 |
| 2024 | HFDP with B-Max Racing Team | FUJ1; 2; 2 | FUJ1; 1 DNS | **SUZ1**; **1**; 1 | **SUZ1**; **2**; 1 | FUJ2; 1; 3 | FUJ2; 2; 8 | SUG; 1; 7 | SUG; 2; 4 | **AUT**; **2**; 1 | MOT; 1; 1 | MOT; 2; 1 | MOT; 3; 1 | SUZ2; 1; 1 | SUZ2; 2; 2 | 1st | 236 |

=== Complete Super Formula Lights results ===
(key) (Races in bold indicate pole position) (Races in italics indicate fastest lap)

| Year | Entrant | 1 | 2 | 3 | 4 | 5 | 6 | 7 | 8 | 9 | 10 | 11 | 12 | 13 | 14 | 15 | 16 | 17 | 18 | Pos | Points |
|---|---|---|---|---|---|---|---|---|---|---|---|---|---|---|---|---|---|---|---|---|---|
| 2025 | B-Max Racing Team | SUZ; 1; 2 | SUZ; 2; 2 | SUZ; 3; 2 | **AUT**; **1**; 8 | AUT; 2; 7 | **OKA**; **1**; 1 | **OKA**; **2**; 1 | OKA; 3; 1 | **SUG**; **1**; 1 | **SUG**; **2**; 1 | SUG; 3; 1 | SUG; 4; 1 | **FUJ**; **1**; 1 | FUJ; 2; 3 | FUJ; 3; 1 | **MOT**; **1**; 1 | **MOT**; **2**; 1 | MOT; 3; 1 | 1st | 153 |

^{*} Season still in progress.

=== Complete Super GT results ===
(key) (Races in bold indicate pole position) (Races in italics indicate fastest lap)

| Year | Team | Car | Class | 1 | 2 | 3 | 4 | 5 | 6 | 7 | 8 | 9 | DC | Points |
|---|---|---|---|---|---|---|---|---|---|---|---|---|---|---|
| 2025 | Team UpGarage | Mercedes-AMG GT3 Evo | GT300 | OKA; 21 | FUJ; 23 | **SEP**; 1 | FS1 (10) | FS2; 7 | SUZ; 11 | SUG; 7 | AUT; 8 | MOT; 10 | 11th | 61.5 |
| 2026 | Astemo Real Racing | Honda Prelude-GT | GT500 | OKA; 10 | FUJ; 9 | FUJ; 5 | **SUZ**; 2 | SUG; 1 | AUT; 14 | MOT; 6 | MOT; 2 | | 2nd | 65 |

^{‡} Half points awarded as less than 75% of race distance was completed.
^{(Number)} Driver did not take part in this sprint race, points are still awarded for the teammate's result.
^{*} Season still in progress.

=== Complete Super Formula results ===
| Year | Team | Engine | 1 | 2 | 3 | 4 | 5 | 6 | 7 | 8 | 9 | 10 | 11 | 12 | DC | Points |
|---|---|---|---|---|---|---|---|---|---|---|---|---|---|---|---|---|
| 2026 | San-Ei Gen with B-Max | Honda | MOT | MOT | AUT | SUZ | SUZ | FUJ | FUJ | SUG | FUJ | FUJ | SUZ | SUZ | | |

^{*} Season still in progress.

Sporting positions
| Preceded by Syun Koide | F4 Japanese Championship; Champion; 2024 | Succeeded by Incumbent |
