= Keito Matsui =

Japanese Race Driver

- Nationality: (Japan) Japanese
- Born: 2 September 2004 (age 22) Kentucky, United States of America

Previous series
- 2025: F4 Japanese Championship

Keito Matsui (松井 啓人, Matsui Keito; born 2 September 2004) is a Japanese racing driver.

== Career ==
=== Formula 4 ===
Matsui made his F4 debut in 2025 F4 Japanese Championship with Akiland Racing. Matsui finished 16th overall with missing one round where he tested with Kessel Racing's GT3 in European Le Mans Series's post season testing.

=== Super Formula Lights ===
Matsui made a one off appearance in Super Formula Lights for B-Max Racing Team, where he replaced Kaylen Frederick.

== Racing record ==
=== Career summary ===
| Season | Series | Team | Races | Wins | Poles | FLaps | Podiums | Points | Position |
|---|---|---|---|---|---|---|---|---|---|
| 2025 | F4 Japanese Championship | Akiland Racing | 14 | 0 | 0 | 0 | 0 | 15 | 16th |
| 2025 | Super Formula Lights | B-Max Racing Team | 3 | 0 | 0 | 0 | 0 | 0 | 19th |

^{*} Season still in progress.

=== Complete F4 Japanese Championship results ===
(key) (Races in bold indicate pole position) (Races in italics indicate fastest lap)

| Year | Team | 1 | 2 | 3 | 4 | 5 | 6 | 7 | 8 | 9 | 10 | 11 | 12 | 13 | 14 | DC | Pts |
|---|---|---|---|---|---|---|---|---|---|---|---|---|---|---|---|---|---|
| 2025 | Akiland Racing | FUJ1; 1; 10 | FUJ1; 2 Ret | FUJ1; 3; 22 | FUJ2; 1; 19 | FUJ2; 2; 22 | SUZ2; 1; 8 | SUZ2; 2; 7 | SUG; 1; 8 | SUG; 2; 14 | SUG; 3; 12 | AUT; 1 WD | AUT; 2 WD | MOT; 1; 15 | MOT; 2 Ret | 16th | 15 |

=== Complete Super Formula Lights results ===
(key) (Races in bold indicate pole position) (Races in italics indicate fastest lap)

| Year | Entrant | 1 | 2 | 3 | 4 | 5 | 6 | 7 | 8 | 9 | 10 | 11 | 12 | 13 | 14 | 15 | 16 | 17 | 18 | Pos | Points |
|---|---|---|---|---|---|---|---|---|---|---|---|---|---|---|---|---|---|---|---|---|---|
| 2025 | B-Max Racing Team | SUZ; 1 | SUZ; 2 | SUZ; 3 | AUT; 1 | AUT; 2 | AUT; 3 | OKA; 1 | OKA; 2 | OKA; 3 | SUG; 1 | SUG; 2 | SUG; 3 | FUJ; 1 | FUJ; 2 | FUJ; 3 | MOT; 1; 11 | MOT; 2 Ret | MOT; 3; 14 | 19th | 0 |
