= Delightworks Racing =

Japanese racing team

- Founded: 2024
- Team principal(s): Masato Shimoyama
- Founder(s): DELiGHTWORKS
- Current series: Super Formula Lights
- Former series: Formula Regional Japanese Championship
- Current drivers: Super Formula Lights: Yusuke Mitsui; Yugo Iwasawa

Delightworks Racing (stylized as DELiGHTWORKS Racing) is a racing team that currently competes in Super Formula Lights. The team was established by gaming company DELiGHTWORKS.

== History ==
=== Formula Regional Japanese ===
Deligtworks Racing started racing in 2024, where they competed in Formula Regional Japanese Championship. They made their debut on the last round of the series in Suzuka, with Yugo Iwasawa as their driver. The team planned to run two cars for 2025, but the team has not compete in 2025 in the series.

=== Super Formula Lights ===
The team then make their full season debut for the first time in 2025 in Super Formula Lights. The team operated partly by Toda Racing, which they took over their spot. They hired former Honda junior driver Yusuke Mitsui, and Souta Arao which the latter left after one round, and replaced by Iwasawa.

=== Super Formula ===
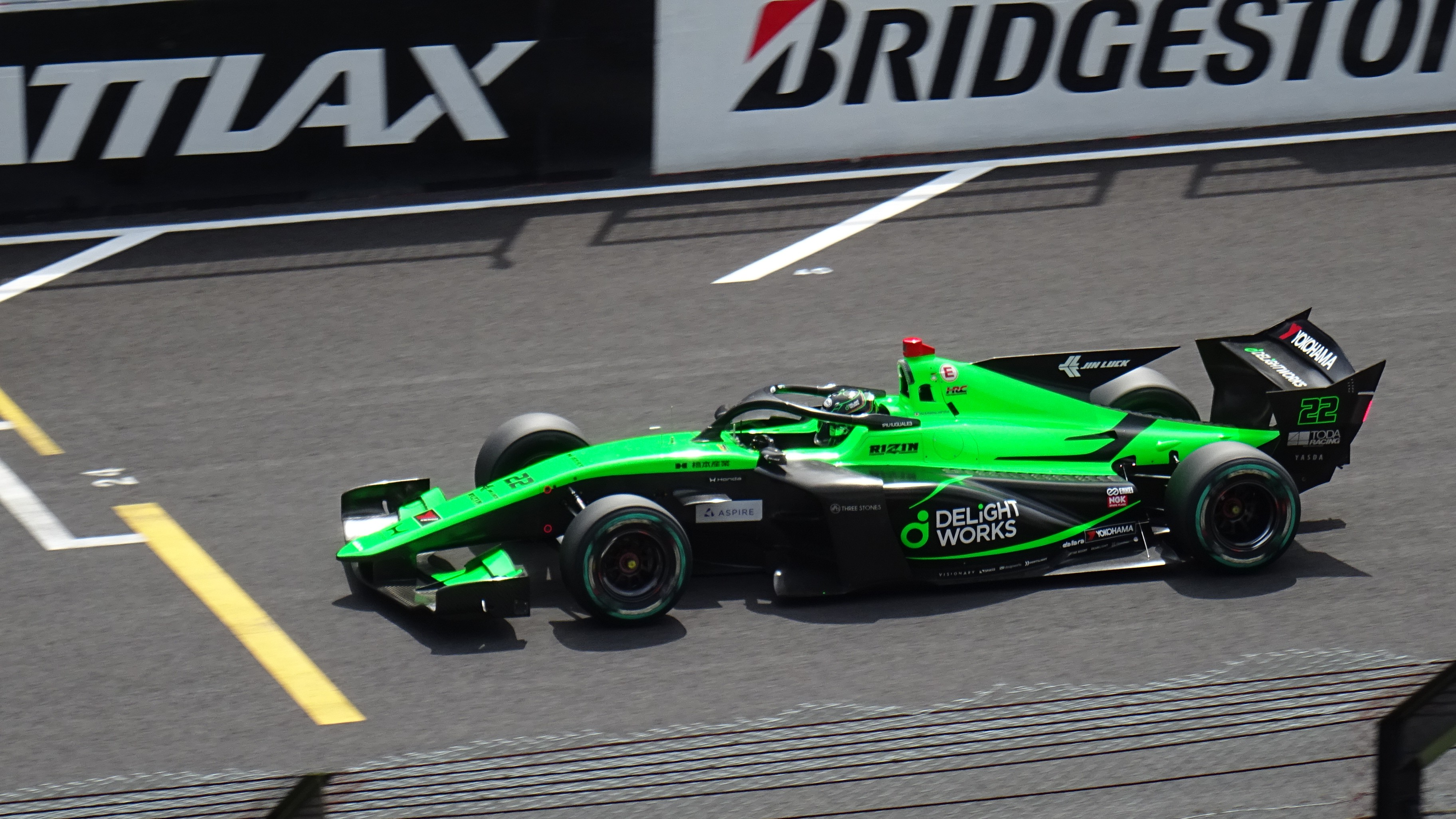
Matsushita driving for the team at Suzuka Circuit on 2026

Delightworks Racing once again expanded their presence, as they will compete in Super Formula Championship. They will race with Honda engines, and recruited Nobuharu Matsushita as their driver, which he worked with the team as the driver advisor.
