= 2025 Super Formula Lights =

Formula racing championship

The 2025 Super Formula Lights Championship was the sixth Super Formula Lights Championship season, after the Japanese Formula 3 Championship was rebranded following the end of the 2019 season.

Yuto Nomura won the Drivers' Championship with three races to spare, becoming the series' first rookie champion, while his team, B-Max Racing Team, won their second Teams' Championship and GNSY Racing's Yasuhiro Shimizu took the Masters' title.

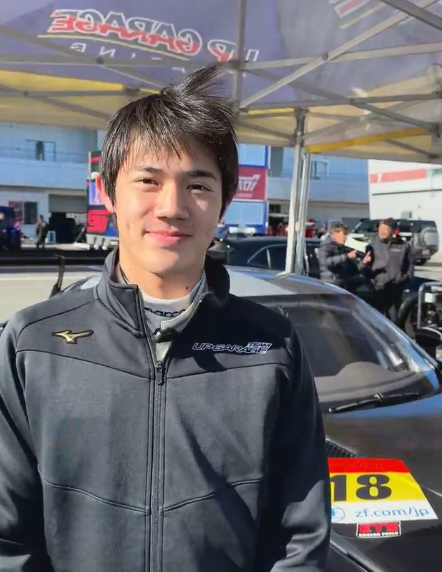
Yuto Nomura, driving for B-Max Racing Team, won the Super Formula Lights title.

== Teams and drivers ==
As the championship is a spec series, all teams competed with an identical Dallara 324 chassis with a Toyota GR Yaris three cylinder 1.6-litre turbo engine, though LM Corsa entered the previous generation Dallara 320 for their single-car entry. All teams competed with tyres supplied by Kumho Tire.

| Team | No. | Driver | Status | Rounds | Ref. |
|---|---|---|---|---|---|
| B-Max Racing Team | 1 | (Japan) Kazuhisa Urabe | | All | |
| B-Max Racing Team | 30 | (Japan) "Dragon" | M | All (Note: Takuya Otaki was originally entered in place of Dragon in the No. 30 car, but withdrew ahead of the round, with Dragon returning to his entry.) | |
| B-Max Racing Team | 30 | (Japan) Takuya Otaki | | 5 | |
| B-Max Racing Team | 50 | (Japan) Yuto Nomura | | All | |
| B-Max Racing Team | 51 | (Philippines) Zachary David | | All | |
| B-Max Racing Team | 58 | (United States) Kaylen Frederick | | 1–5 | |
| B-Max Racing Team | 58 | (Japan) Keito Matsui | | 6 | |
| Delightworks Racing | 2 | (Japan) Souta Arao | | 1 | |
| Delightworks Racing | 2 | (Japan) Yugo Iwasawa | | 2–3 | |
| Delightworks Racing | 2 | (Japan) Hiyu Yamakoshi | | 6 | |
| Delightworks Racing | 3 | (Japan) Yusuke Mitsui | | All | |
| JMS Racing Team | 4 | (Japan) Nobuhiro Imada | M | All (Note: Nobuhiro Imada and Esteban Masson were both entered into the first round, but both withdrew ahead of the round. They were replaced by Tosei Moriyama and Seita Nonaka, respectively.) | |
| JMS Racing Team | 4 | (Japan) Tosei Moriyama | | 1 | |
| Buzz Racing | 6 | (Japan) "Ken Alex" | M | 6 | |
| GNSY Racing | 8 | (Japan) Yasuhiro Shimizu | M | All | |
| TOM'S | 35 | (Japan) Yuki Sano | | All | |
| TOM'S | 36 | (France) Esteban Masson | | All | |
| TOM'S | 36 | (Japan) Seita Nonaka | | 1 (Note: Seita Nonaka was initially entered into the opening round to replace Esteban Masson, but was later called up to replace Team Impul's Oliver Rasmussen in SFL's parent series Super Formula for that round.) | |
| TOM'S | 37 | (Japan) Yuga Furutani | | All | |
| TOM'S | 38 | (Japan) Rikuto Kobayashi | | All | |
| LM corsa | 60 | (Japan) Reimei Ito | | All | |

| Icon | Class |
|---|---|
| M | Masters' Cup |

=== Team changes ===
B-Max Racing Team stopped running the No. 30 car under the Team Dragon guise, instead entering it as a normal B-Max Racing Team entry.

LM corsa made their full-season debut in the series after entering two rounds in 2024.

Delightworks Racing, a new team established by gaming company DELiGHTWORKS in 2024, where they competed in the last round of Formula Regional Japan, joined the series. The team took over Toda Racing's entry as that team, a series mainstay ever since 1988, when the series was called Japanese Formula 3, did not continue their entry into 2025.

Albirex Racing Team did not return to the championship after entering the final two rounds of the 2024 season.

==== Mid-season ====
F4 Japan team Buzz Racing made their series debut for the final round at Motegi, with B-Max Racing operating the entry.

=== Driver changes ===
Reigning Teams' Champion TOM'S saw Jin Nakamura and Seita Nonaka leave the series as Nakamura moved to Formula Regional Europe with R-ace GP and Nonaka focused on his continued Super GT GT300 efforts with Saitama Green Brave. The team signed 2023 Eurocup-3 champion Esteban Masson, who came 27th in the WEC's LMGT3 class with Akkodis ASP in 2024, and Yuki Sano, who finished fourth in the 2024 F4 Japanese Championship driving for the TGR-DC Racing School.

B-Max Racing Team saw reigning Drivers' Champion Syun Koide graduate to the team's Super Formula outfit, while Rin Arakawa joined Tomei Sports in Super GT GT300 and Makoto Fujiwara also left the series. B-Max promoted 2024 F4 Japanese champion Yuto Nomura from its outfit in that championship. The team also signed Kazuhisa Urabe, who stepped up from Japanese F4 after finishing 11th in 2024 with TGR-DC Racing School. Zachary David completed the team's lineup, debuting in SFL alongside a sophomore FRECA campaign with CL Motorsport after finishing his rookie campaign there 13th driving for R-ace GP.

Reigning Porsche Carrera Cup Japan champion Reimei Ito made his full-season debut with LM corsa after entering two rounds with the team in 2024 and finishing the season in ninth.

New team Delightworks Racing contracted two former HFDP drivers for their SFL debut. They signed Souta Arao, who finished the 2024 season in seventh driving for Toda Racing, and 2022 F4 Japanese runner-up Yusuke Mitsui, who would make his rookie debut in the series after spending 2024 racing in Super Taikyu ST-2 with Team Spoon and Super GT - GT300 with Team UpGarage.

Tsubasa Iriyama left the series along with Albirex Racing Team.

==== Mid-season ====
Two drivers withdrew shortly ahead of the opening round: JMS Racing Team's Nobuhiro Imada suffered a hand injury ahead of the event and was replaced by Tosei Moriyama, who finished fifth in both Japanese F4 and the FIA Motorsport Games Formula 4 Cup. TOM'S driver Esteban Masson was also unable to race due to an injury and was initially set to be replaced by Seita Nonaka, who would return to the No. 38 car he drove to third in the standings in 2024. However, when Team Impul's Super Formula driver Oliver Rasmussen sustained an injury during free practice, Nonaka was called up to replace him and TOM'S opted against fielding the No. 36 car.

Souta Arao parted ways with Delightworks Racing after round one. Former Super GT GT300 driver Yugo Iwasawa replaced him for rounds two and three, making his debut in the series, before the team scaled back to a single entry for Mitsui for round four.

Former Super GT GT300 driver Takuya Otaki was to make his Super Formula Lights debut in round five, replacing Dragon in the No. 30 B-Max Racing Team car, but he withdrew shortly before the weekend, with Dragon returning to his entry.

Delightworks Racing ran two cars in the season finale, with Formula Regional European driver Hiyu Yamakoshi making his Super Formula Lights debut. F4 Japan driver Keito Matsui also competed in the season finale, replacing Kaylen Frederick at B-Max Racing Team. Ken Watanabe, who races under the pseudonym "Ken Alex", made his SFL debut in the Masters' Cup with new entrant Buzz Racing.

== Race calendar ==
The calendar for the 2025 season was announced on 11 November 2024. It once again consisted of eighteen races held over six weekends at six circuits. Two of the events supported the parent Super Formula Championship.

| Round | | Circuit | Date | Supporting | Map of circuit locations |
|---|---|---|---|---|---|
| 1 | R1 | Suzuka International Racing Course, Suzuka | 8 March | Super Formula Championship; Honda N-One Owner's Cup | 2025 Super Formula Lights is located in Japan |
| 1 | R2 | Suzuka International Racing Course, Suzuka | 9 March | Super Formula Championship; Honda N-One Owner's Cup | 2025 Super Formula Lights is located in Japan |
| 1 | R3 | Suzuka International Racing Course, Suzuka | 9 March | Super Formula Championship; Honda N-One Owner's Cup | 2025 Super Formula Lights is located in Japan |
| 2 | R4 (Note: Race 4 moved to 18 May due to adverse weather conditions, with race 6 postponed to another round.) | Autopolis, Hita | 17 May | Super Formula Championship; Honda N-One Owner's Cup | 2025 Super Formula Lights is located in Japan |
| 2 | R5 | Autopolis, Hita | 18 May | Super Formula Championship; Honda N-One Owner's Cup | 2025 Super Formula Lights is located in Japan |
| 2 | R6 | Autopolis, Hita | 18 May | Super Formula Championship; Honda N-One Owner's Cup | 2025 Super Formula Lights is located in Japan |
| 3 | R7 | Okayama International Circuit, Mimasaka | 21 June | Porsche Sprint Challenge Japan; Mini Challenge Japan; BMW M2 CS Racing Series; Roadster Party Race | 2025 Super Formula Lights is located in Japan |
| 3 | R8 | Okayama International Circuit, Mimasaka | 22 June | Porsche Sprint Challenge Japan; Mini Challenge Japan; BMW M2 CS Racing Series; Roadster Party Race | 2025 Super Formula Lights is located in Japan |
| 3 | R9 | Okayama International Circuit, Mimasaka | 22 June | Porsche Sprint Challenge Japan; Mini Challenge Japan; BMW M2 CS Racing Series; Roadster Party Race | 2025 Super Formula Lights is located in Japan |
| 4 | R10 | Sportsland Sugo, Murata | 30 August | Formula Regional Japanese Championship; SUGO Champion Cup Race Series | 2025 Super Formula Lights is located in Japan |
| 4 | R11 | Sportsland Sugo, Murata | 30 August | Formula Regional Japanese Championship; SUGO Champion Cup Race Series | 2025 Super Formula Lights is located in Japan |
| 4 | R12 | Sportsland Sugo, Murata | 31 August | Formula Regional Japanese Championship; SUGO Champion Cup Race Series | 2025 Super Formula Lights is located in Japan |
| 4 | R6 (Note: Race 6, which was postponed due to adverse weather conditions, was moved to the 4th round at Sugo.) | Sportsland Sugo, Murata | 31 August | Formula Regional Japanese Championship; SUGO Champion Cup Race Series | 2025 Super Formula Lights is located in Japan |
| 5 | R13 | Fuji Speedway, Oyama | 6 September | Fuji Champion Race Series; BMW M2 CS Racing Series; Mini Challenge Japan; Toyota Gazoo Racing GR86/BRZ Cup | 2025 Super Formula Lights is located in Japan |
| 5 | R14 | Fuji Speedway, Oyama | 7 September | Fuji Champion Race Series; BMW M2 CS Racing Series; Mini Challenge Japan; Toyota Gazoo Racing GR86/BRZ Cup | 2025 Super Formula Lights is located in Japan |
| 5 | R15 | Fuji Speedway, Oyama | 7 September | Fuji Champion Race Series; BMW M2 CS Racing Series; Mini Challenge Japan; Toyota Gazoo Racing GR86/BRZ Cup | 2025 Super Formula Lights is located in Japan |
| 6 | R16 | Mobility Resort Motegi, Motegi | 29 November | Motegi Champion Cup Race | 2025 Super Formula Lights is located in Japan |
| 6 | R17 | Mobility Resort Motegi, Motegi | 30 November | Motegi Champion Cup Race | 2025 Super Formula Lights is located in Japan |
| 6 | R18 | Mobility Resort Motegi, Motegi | 30 November | Motegi Champion Cup Race | 2025 Super Formula Lights is located in Japan |

== Race results ==
| Round | | Circuit | Pole position | Fastest lap | Winning driver | Winning team | Masters winner |
|---|---|---|---|---|---|---|---|
| 1 | R1 | Suzuka International Racing Course | (Japan) Yuki Sano | (Japan) Yuto Nomura | (Japan) Yuki Sano | TOM'S | (Japan) Yasuhiro Shimizu |
| 1 | R2 | Suzuka International Racing Course | (Japan) Yuki Sano | (Japan) Yuki Sano | (Japan) Yuki Sano | TOM'S | (Japan) Yasuhiro Shimizu |
| 1 | R3 | Suzuka International Racing Course | | (Japan) Kazuhisa Urabe | (Japan) Yuki Sano | TOM'S | (Japan) Yasuhiro Shimizu |
| 2 | R4 | Autopolis | (Japan) Yuto Nomura (Note: Qualifying for round 2 was canceled due to adverse weather conditions. The results of the final practice sessions formed the grid for race 4 and 5. Yuto Nomura and Kaylen Frederick each started a race on pole position, but no points were awarded for qualifying.) | (Japan) Yuki Sano | (Japan) Yuki Sano | TOM'S | (Japan) Yasuhiro Shimizu |
| 2 | R5 | Autopolis | (United States) Kaylen Frederick | (United States) Kaylen Frederick | (United States) Kaylen Frederick | B-Max Racing Team | (Japan) Nobuhiro Imada |
| 2 | R6 | Autopolis | postponed due to adverse weather conditions | | | | |
| 3 | R7 | Okayama International Circuit | (Japan) Yuto Nomura | (Japan) Yuto Nomura | (Japan) Yuto Nomura | B-Max Racing Team | (Japan) Yasuhiro Shimizu |
| 3 | R8 | Okayama International Circuit | (Japan) Yuto Nomura | (Japan) Yuto Nomura | (Japan) Yuto Nomura | B-Max Racing Team | (Japan) "Dragon" |
| 3 | R9 | Okayama International Circuit | | (Japan) Yuto Nomura | (Japan) Yuto Nomura | B-Max Racing Team | (Japan) Yasuhiro Shimizu |
| 4 | R10 | Sportsland SUGO | (Japan) Yuto Nomura | (Japan) Yuto Nomura | (Japan) Yuto Nomura | B-Max Racing Team | (Japan) Nobuhiro Imada |
| 4 | R11 | Sportsland SUGO | (Japan) Yuto Nomura | (Japan) Yuki Sano | (Japan) Yuto Nomura | B-Max Racing Team | (Japan) Nobuhiro Imada |
| 4 | R12 | Sportsland SUGO | | (Japan) Yuto Nomura | (Japan) Yuto Nomura | B-Max Racing Team | (Japan) Nobuhiro Imada |
| 4 | R6 | Sportsland SUGO | | (Japan) Yuki Sano | (Japan) Yuto Nomura | B-Max Racing Team | (Japan) Nobuhiro Imada |
| 5 | R13 | Fuji Speedway | (Japan) Yuto Nomura | (Japan) Yuki Sano | (Japan) Yuto Nomura | B-Max Racing Team | (Japan) "Dragon" |
| 5 | R14 | Fuji Speedway | (Japan) Rikuto Kobayashi | (Japan) Rikuto Kobayashi | (Japan) Rikuto Kobayashi | TOM'S | (Japan) Nobuhiro Imada |
| 5 | R15 | Fuji Speedway | | (Japan) Yuga Furutani | (Japan) Yuto Nomura | B-Max Racing Team | (Japan) Yasuhiro Shimizu |
| 6 | R16 | Mobility Resort Motegi | (Japan) Yuto Nomura | (Japan) Yuto Nomura | (Japan) Yuto Nomura | B-Max Racing Team | (Japan) Yasuhiro Shimizu |
| 6 | R17 | Mobility Resort Motegi | (Japan) Yuto Nomura | (Japan) Yuto Nomura | (Japan) Yuto Nomura | B-Max Racing Team | (Japan) "Ken Alex" |
| 6 | R18 | Mobility Resort Motegi | | (Japan) Rikuto Kobayashi | (Japan) Yuto Nomura | B-Max Racing Team | (Japan) Yasuhiro Shimizu |

== Season report ==
The 2025 Super Formula Lights season began at Suzuka with TOM'S driver Yuki Sano claiming both pole positions in qualifying. He lost his lead to B-Max Racing's Yuto Nomura amidst multiple drivers stalling at the start of the opening race. The latter earned a penalty for a jump start that dropped him back to second after the flag, while Rikuto Kobayashi made it a TOM'S 1-3 on the podium. Race two saw Sano notch up an untroubled second win, leading the B-Max pair of Nomura and Kaylen Frederick as Kobayashi suffered a transmission failure and Delightworks Racing's Souta Arao ran off track from second place. Race three saw Sano initially drop to third behind Nomura and Kobayashi, but he repassed the former before the latter went off from the lead and dropped to third, allowing Sano to finish the weekend with a perfect score and take an eleven-point lead.

Autopolis hosted the second round of the year, and the weekend was heavily disrupted by severe fog. Both qualifying sessions on Saturday were cancelled, with the starting grids for the two races held on Sunday formed by the results of the final practice session and the third race of the weekend postponed to round four. Nomura started the first race from pole position, but wheelspin cost him at the start. Sano and Frederick passed him right there, before he dropped further down, handing the final podium spot to TOM'S driver Esteban Masson as Sano took his fourth win in a row. Frederick won race two from pole position as Sano rose to second at the start. He spent the race defending from teammate Yuga Furutani, who had started fifth and battled his way up the order. Frederick's win saw him move past Nomura into second in the standings, 24 points behind Sano.

Round three at Okayama saw Nomura bounce back from his two pointless races as he claimed both pole positions in qualifying. He kept teammate Zachary David behind him at the start, which started a fight for second and allowed him to gap the field. He claimed an unchallenged victory as Kobayashi got into second place after trying for multiple laps. Race two saw more of the same, with Nomura again establishing an early lead, leaving Masson and Kobayashi in second and third as the Frenchman got close to the lead in the latter stages, but did not make a move. The final race brought another victory for Nomura, who led lights-to-flag ahead of Kobayashi and Frederick. Pre-event points leader Sano closed a difficult weekend with seventh place - four points across the three races saw him now level in the standings with Nomura, only ahead courtesy of having one more win.

Round four at Sugo featured four races to make up for the cancellation of Autopolis' third race. Nomura was the man to beat all weekend as he topped both qualifying sessions. He took an unchallenged victory in the opening race as Sano and Kobayashi completed the podium behind him. Race two began with David and Masson colliding while fighting over third place, with the former then retiring and Masson going off track. That saw Furutani move into third, and Nomura led Sano once again. Race three saw Nomura convert another pole position into a third win in a row as he spent the race managing his gap to Sano behind, with Kobayashi third. Sano jumped the start of the fourth race, but was still unable to take the lead off Nomura before he got a penalty. He kept close to Nomura to keep second ahead of Furutani, but Nomura now led the standings by 14 points.

The penultimate round of the season was held at Fuji Speedway, where Nomura and Kobayashi shared pole positions in qualifying. Nomura had a bad start to race one and lost out to Kobayashi and Sano, who then collided when Sano tried to take the lead. Nomura had to take evasive action and dropped to sixth. He spent the rest of the race working his way up the order, finishing second on the road and inheriting the win when Sano was penalized for the collision. Masson and Furutani completed the podium. Nomura had a bad start once again in race two, dropping to fourth before an off for Furutani ahead promoted him back to third. He finished there as Kobayashi led Delightworks' Yusuke Mitsui. Race three saw Nomura finally hold on to the lead at the start. He led Furutani and Kobayashi to take his ninth win of the season and wrap up the championship title one round early.

Mobility Resort Motegi hosted the season final, and the whole weekend was a display of dominance by newly-crowned champion Nomura. He began the event by adding two more pole positions to his tally, both ahead of Sano. The first race saw Nomura retain the lead after Sano lost second to Kobayashi with a bad start. He managed the rest of the race, controlling a mid-race safety car restart, to take win number ten of his campaign. The start of race two mirrored that of race one, with Kobayashi getting past Sano once again. Multiple incidents caused a first-lap safety car, and the order remained static afterwards, handing another victory to Nomura. Race three brought no change in the results, with the podium once again made up of Nomura ahead of Kobayashi and Sano as the former ended his campaign in style by sweeping the final weekend.

Twelve wins and four further podiums across eighteen races, eight pole positions in twelve qualifying sessions and a 49-point margin over the runner-up - Nomura arguably became the most dominant champion in Super Formula history. Matching Ritomo Miyata's win record from the 2020 season, he crushed any opposition from the rest of the field. Though Sano started the season off with a four-race win streak, once Nomura had taken two weekends to bed himself into the championship, he started winning and just would not stop. He started an eight-race win streak, broken up only by a third place at Fuji, before four more wins absolutely cemented him as the champion ahead of a deserved step up to Super Formula in 2026.

== Championship standings ==
Points were awarded as follows:

| 1 | 2 | 3 | 4 | 5 | 6 | PP |
|---|---|---|---|---|---|---|
| 10 | 7 | 5 | 3 | 2 | 1 | **1** |

=== Drivers' championships ===
==== Overall ====
| Pos | Driver | SUZ | | | AUT | | OKA | | | SUG | | | | FUJ | | | MOT | | | Points |
| Pos | Driver | R1 | R2 | R3 | R4 | R5 | R7 | R8 | R9 | R10 | R11 | R12 | R6 | R13 | R14 | R15 | R16 | R17 | R18 | Points |
|---|---|---|---|---|---|---|---|---|---|---|---|---|---|---|---|---|---|---|---|---|
| 1 | (Japan) Yuto Nomura | 2 | 2 | 2 | **8** | 7 | **1** | **1** | 1 | **1** | **1** | 1 | 1 | **1** | 3 | 1 | **1** | **1** | 1 | 153 |
| 2 | (Japan) Yuki Sano | **1** | **1** | 1 | 1 | 2 | 5 | 5 | 7 | 2 | 2 | 2 | 2 | 5 | 4 | 4 | 3 | 3 | 3 | 104 |
| 3 | (Japan) Rikuto Kobayashi | 3 | Ret | 3 | 6 | 4 | 2 | 3 | 2 | 3 | 4 | 3 | 5 | 11 | **1** | 3 | 2 | 2 | 2 | 85 |
| 4 | (Japan) Yuga Furutani | 10 | 4 | 11 | 4 | 3 | 8 | 8 | 8 | 9 | 3 | 7 | 3 | 3 | 6 | 2 | 6 | Ret | 6 | 36 |
| 5 | (United States) Kaylen Frederick | 9 | 3 | 5 | 2 | **1** | 4 | 7 | 3 | 6 | 7 | 6 | 10 | 9 | 9 | 6 | | | | 35 |
| 6 | (Japan) Yusuke Mitsui | 5 | 7 | 6 | 7 | 6 | 6 | 4 | 6 | 7 | 5 | 9 | 4 | 4 | 2 | 13 | 4 | 4 | 5 | 32 |
| 7 | (France) Esteban Masson | WD | WD | WD | 3 | 5 | 7 | 2 | 5 | 5 | Ret | 4 | 7 | 2 | 5 | 7 | 8 | 6 | 8 | 31 |
| 8 | (Philippines) Zachary David | 4 | 8 | 4 | 5 | 10 | 3 | 6 | 4 | 4 | Ret | 5 | 8 | 6 | 7 | 5 | 9 | Ret | DNS | 25 |
| 9 | (Japan) Hiyu Yamakoshi | | | | | | | | | | | | | | | | 5 | 5 | 4 | 7 |
| 10 | (Japan) Kazuhisa Urabe | 6 | 5 | 10 | 9 | 8 | 11 | 9 | 9 | 8 | 6 | 13 | 6 | 7 | 10 | 9 | 7 | Ret | 7 | 5 |
| 11 | (Japan) Reimei Ito | 11 | 6 | 9 | 11 | 9 | 9 | 10 | Ret | 10 | 8 | 8 | 9 | 8 | 8 | 8 | 10 | 7 | 9 | 1 |
| 12 | (Japan) Tosei Moriyama | 7 | 10 | 8 | | | | | | | | | | | | | | | | 0 |
| 13 | (Japan) Souta Arao | 8 | 11 | 7 | | | | | | | | | | | | | | | | 0 |
| 14 | (Japan) "Ken Alex" | | | | | | | | | | | | | | | | 14 | 8 | 12 | 0 |
| 15 | (Japan) Nobuhiro Imada | WD | WD | WD | 13 | 11 | WD | WD | WD | 11 | 9 | 10 | 11 | 12 | 11 | 11 | Ret | 9 | 13 | 0 |
| 16 | (Japan) Yasuhiro Shimizu | 12 | 9 | 12 | 12 | 13 | 12 | Ret | 11 | 12 | 11 | 11 | 12 | Ret | 13 | 10 | 12 | Ret | 10 | 0 |
| 17 | (Japan) Yugo Iwasawa | | | | 10 | 14 | 10 | 11 | 10 | | | | | | | | | | | 0 |
| 18 | (Japan) "Dragon" | 13 | Ret | 13 | 14 | 12 | 13 | 12 | 12 | 13 | 10 | 12 | 13 | 10 | 12 | 12 | 13 | Ret | 11 | 0 |
| 19 | (Japan) Keito Matsui | | | | | | | | | | | | | | | | 11 | Ret | 14 | 0 |
| — | (Japan) Seita Nonaka | WD | WD | WD | | | | | | | | | | | | | | | | 0 |
| — | (Japan) Takuya Otaki | | | | | | | | | | | | | WD | WD | WD | | | | 0 |
| Pos | Driver | R1 | R2 | R3 | R4 | R5 | R7 | R8 | R9 | R10 | R11 | R12 | R6 | R13 | R14 | R15 | R16 | R17 | R18 | Points |
| Pos | Driver | SUZ | | | AUT | | OKA | | | SUG | | | | FUJ | | | MOT | | | Points |

Key
| Colour | Result |
|---|---|
| Gold | Winner |
| Silver | Second place |
| Bronze | Third place |
| Green | Other points position |
| Blue | Other classified position |
| Blue | Not classified, finished (NC) |
| Purple | Not classified, retired (Ret) |
| Red | Did not qualify (DNQ) |
| Red | Did not pre-qualify (DNPQ) |
| Black | Disqualified (DSQ) |
| White | Did not start (DNS) |
| White | Race cancelled (C) |
| Blank | Did not practice (DNP) |
| Blank | Excluded (EX) |
| Blank | Did not arrive (DNA) |
| Blank | Withdrawn (WD) |
| Blank | Did not enter (cell empty) |
| Text formatting | Meaning |
| **Bold** | Pole position |
| Italics | Fastest lap |

==== Masters' Class ====
| Pos | Driver | SUZ | | | AUT | | OKA | | | SUG | | | | FUJ | | | MOT | | | Points |
| Pos | Driver | R1 | R2 | R3 | R4 | R5 | R7 | R8 | R9 | R10 | R11 | R12 | R6 | R13 | R14 | R15 | R16 | R17 | R18 | Points |
|---|---|---|---|---|---|---|---|---|---|---|---|---|---|---|---|---|---|---|---|---|
| 1 | (Japan) Yasuhiro Shimizu | **1** | **1** | 1 | 1 | 3 | **1** | **Ret** | 1 | 2 | **3** | 2 | 2 | **Ret** | **3** | 1 | 1 | Ret | 1 | 133 |
| 2 | (Japan) "Dragon" | 2 | Ret | 2 | 3 | 2 | 2 | 1 | 2 | 3 | 2 | 3 | 3 | 1 | 2 | 3 | 2 | Ret | 2 | 108 |
| 3 | (Japan) Nobuhiro Imada | WD | WD | WD | **2** | **1** | WD | WD | WD | **1** | 1 | 1 | 1 | 2 | 1 | 2 | Ret | 2 | 4 | 92 |
| 4 | (Japan) "Ken Alex" | | | | | | | | | | | | | | | | **3** | **1** | 3 | 22 |
| Pos | Driver | R1 | R2 | R3 | R4 | R5 | R7 | R8 | R9 | R10 | R11 | R12 | R6 | R13 | R14 | R15 | R16 | R17 | R18 | Points |
| Pos | Driver | SUZ | | | AUT | | OKA | | | SUG | | | | FUJ | | | MOT | | | Points |

=== Teams' standings ===
Only a teams' best finishing driver was eligible to score Teams' Championship points.

| Pos | Driver | SUZ | | | AUT | | OKA | | | SUG | | | | FUJ | | | MOT | | | Points |
| Pos | Driver | R1 | R2 | R3 | R4 | R5 | R7 | R8 | R9 | R10 | R11 | R12 | R6 | R13 | R14 | R15 | R16 | R17 | R18 | Points |
|---|---|---|---|---|---|---|---|---|---|---|---|---|---|---|---|---|---|---|---|---|
| 1 | B-Max Racing Team | 2 | 2 | 2 | 2 | 1 | 1 | 1 | 1 | 1 | 1 | 1 | 1 | 1 | 3 | 1 | 1 | 1 | 1 | 163 |
| 2 | TOM'S | 1 | 1 | 1 | 1 | 2 | 2 | 2 | 2 | 2 | 2 | 2 | 2 | 2 | 1 | 2 | 2 | 2 | 2 | 141 |
| 3 | Delightworks Racing | 5 | 7 | 6 | 7 | 6 | 6 | 4 | 6 | 7 | 5 | 9 | 4 | 4 | 2 | 13 | 4 | 4 | 4 | 33 |
| 4 | LM corsa | 11 | 6 | 9 | 11 | 9 | 9 | 10 | Ret | 10 | 8 | 8 | 9 | 8 | 8 | 8 | 10 | 7 | 9 | 1 |
| 5 | JMS Racing Team | 7 | 10 | 8 | 13 | 11 | WD | WD | WD | 11 | 9 | 10 | 11 | 12 | 11 | 11 | Ret | 9 | 13 | 0 |
| 6 | Buzz Racing | | | | | | | | | | | | | | | | 14 | 8 | 12 | 0 |
| 7 | GNSY Racing | 12 | 9 | 12 | 12 | 13 | 12 | Ret | 11 | 12 | 11 | 11 | 12 | Ret | 13 | 10 | 12 | Ret | 10 | 0 |
| Pos | Driver | R1 | R2 | R3 | R4 | R5 | R7 | R8 | R9 | R10 | R11 | R12 | R6 | R13 | R14 | R15 | R16 | R17 | R18 | Points |
| Pos | Driver | SUZ | | | AUT | | OKA | | | SUG | | | | FUJ | | | MOT | | | Points |
