= Dome F110 =

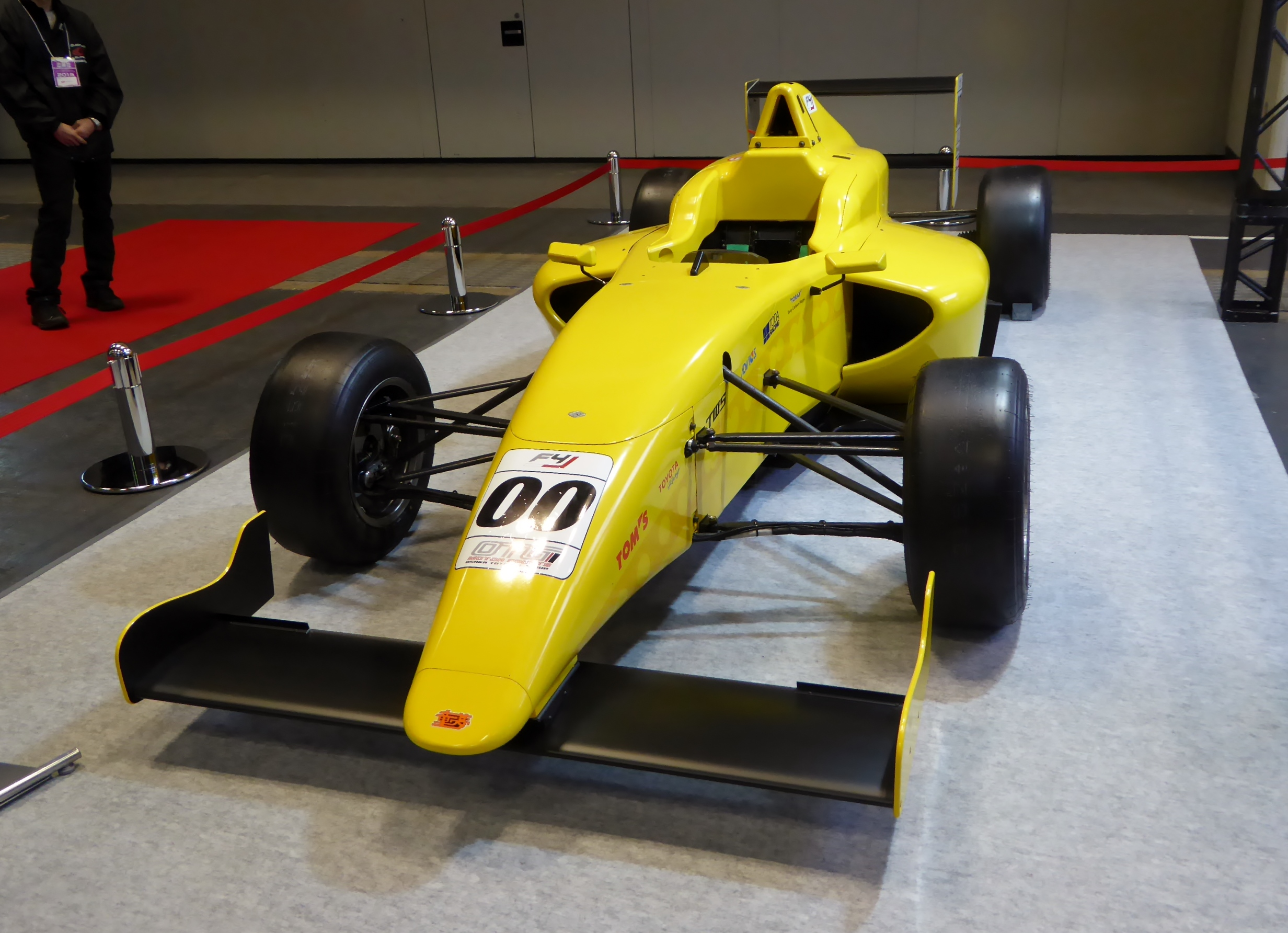
- Category: Formula 4
- Successor: Toray Carbon Magic MCS4-24

Technical specifications
- Chassis: Carbon fibre monocoque
- Length: 4,340 millimetres (171 in)
- Width: 1,738 millimetres (68.4 in)
- Height: 950 millimetres (37 in)
- Axle track: 1,500 millimetres (59 in) (Front); 1,460 millimetres (57 in) (Rear)
- Wheelbase: 2,750 millimetres (108 in)
- Engine: TOM'S Toyota TZR42 1,987 cubic centimetres (121.3 cu in; 1.987 L) (80.5 by 97.6 millimetres (3.17 in × 3.84 in)) Inline-4, RMR NA, 16-valve, DOHC
- Transmission: 6-speed sequential manual Toda Racing
- Power: 160 metric horsepower (160 bhp; 120 kW) @ 5,800 rpm 180 newton-metres (130 lbf⋅ft)
- Weight: 610 kilograms (1,340 lb)
- Tyres: Dunlop

Competition history
- Debut: 2015 Japanese F4 Okayama Round
- Last season: 2023 F4 Japanese Championship

The Dome F110 is an FIA Formula 4 standard formula car manufactured and marketed by Dome Corporation in collaboration with the Japan Motor Racing Industry Association (JMIA). Since the 2015 season, it has been used as the sole car in the Japanese F4 Championship.

== Summary ==
Until now, Formula 4 (F4) has been a regional category started voluntarily by local organizations and clubs, such as JAF-F4, but in 2014, the Fédération Internationale de l'Automobile (FIA) set guidelines for F4 standards and made it a global rule. At the time, JMIA President Minoru Hayashi was concerned about this and worried that Japanese-made entry-level racing cars would be eliminated and replaced by foreign-made cars from Western countries that had passed the FIA standards. Therefore, he tried to prevent this by developing a Japanese-made FIA-F4 as JMIA and partnering with the GT Association, but at the same time he was criticized by the organizations involved in JAF-F4.

The development process was done in collaboration with JMIA member companies, with the engine built by TOM'S and the gearbox by Toda Racing, while Toyota Motor Corporation provided support through Toyota Technocraft."

In 2016, the ADR (Accident Data Recorder) and throttle failure safety were updated.

In 2017, the 6kJ tether and headrests and seats were updated in line with FIA rule changes.

In 2018, the FIA regulations were revised following an accident at a championship in another country (the vehicle was not company-owned), with the addition of front anti-intrusion panels and an updated rear structure. After the addition of this equipment, the minimum weight for the Japanese series was raised to 610 kg (1,340 pounds).

Due to revised FIA safety standards, conventional vehicles will no longer be allowed to be used after 2023, so the F110 will also cede its place to its successor, the MCS4-24 (built by Toray Carbon Magic), after that year.

== Specifications ==
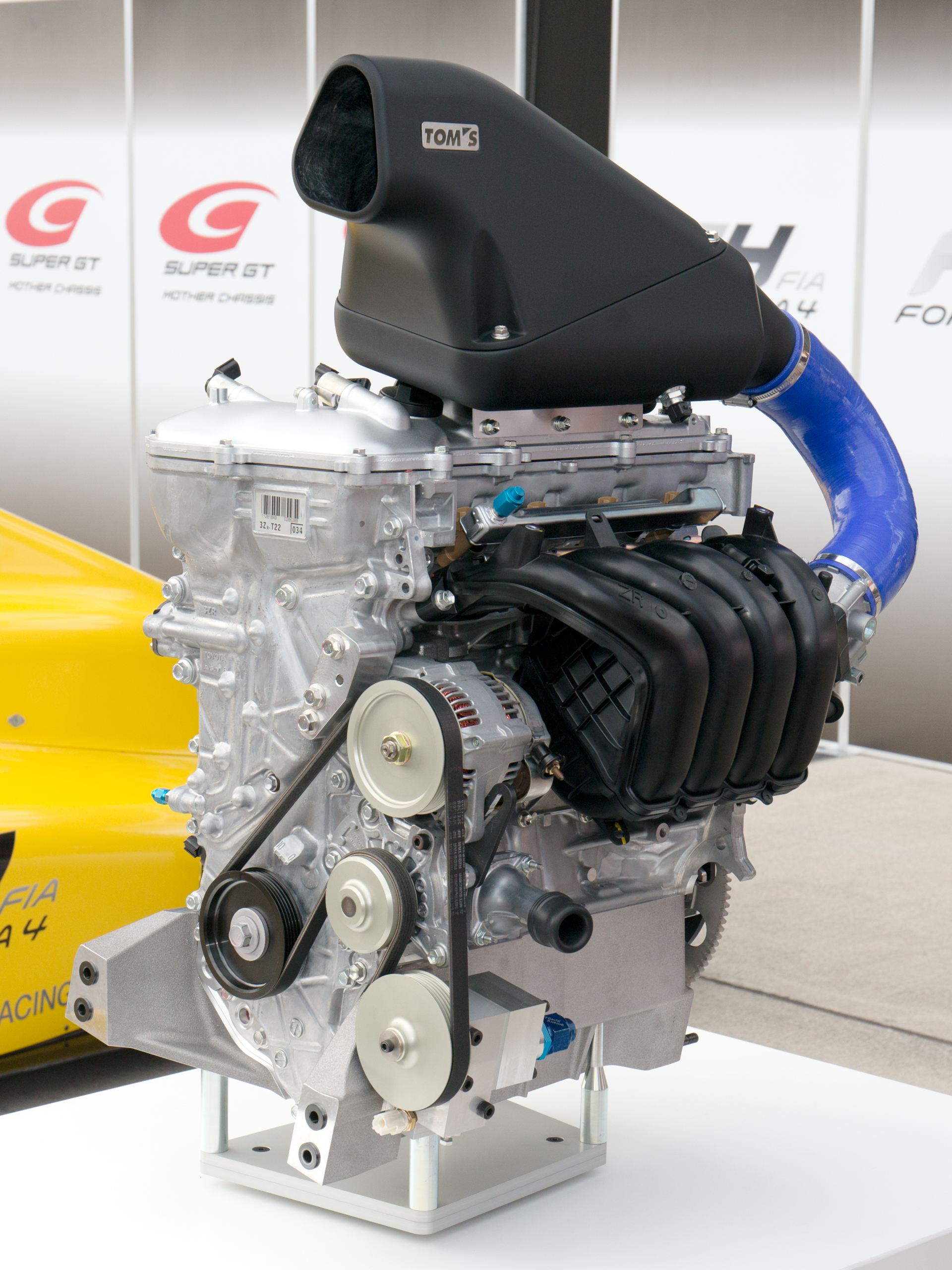
TOM'S Toyota TZR42 engine

As of 2015.

- Overall length: 4,340 mm
- Overall width: 1,738 mm
- Height: 950 mm (from reference plane)
- Wheelbase: 2,750 mm
- Wheelbase: 1,500 mm front / 1,460 mm rear
- Weight: 610 kg (1,340 lb) (including drivers)
- Tyres: Dunlop 195/550R13 (front) / 240/570R13 (rear)
- Wheels: TWS Forged aluminum, 8J-13 front / 10J-13 rear
- Engine: TOM'S Toyota TZR42 DOHC 16-valve Variable valve timing Electronic throttle
- Capacity: 1,987cc
- Bore stroke: 80.5 mm x 97.6 mm
- Maximum output: 160 PS at 5,800 rpm
- Clutch: 7.25-inch AP single plate
- Electrical components: R&Sport ECU
- AIM display/data logger
- Monocoque: FIA-approved carbon monocoque/front and rear impact structure
- Body and floor: Fibreglass
- Suspension: Double wishbones/Pushrod-on uprights/Twin shocks/anti-roll bar
- Brakes: ADVICS two-pot calipers/ventilated discs
- Aerodynamic devices: Front single element wing/garnier wing, rear twin element wing
- Gearbox: Toda Racing 6-speed sequential paddle shifters
- Safety equipment: FIA-approved 6-point harness/safety headrests/FIA FT3-1999 regulation safety fuel cell/front and rear 6kJ tethers

== Derivative models ==
In March 2019, it was announced that the F110 monocoque and key components would be used to supply the chassis for the EV race car.

In January 2020, the concept of the ERA Electric Racing Academy Championship series was announced, with a one-make chassis called the 'Mitsu-Bachi' F110e, which is based on the F110 chassis. The series will be based on the F110 chassis and will feature a one-make chassis called the 'Mitsu-Bachi' F110e, with a total of four rounds planned in the second half of 2020 in the UK, Belgium and the Netherlands.
