= 2026 SRO Japan Cup =

Motor racing competition season

The 2026 SRO Japan Cup was the fifth season of the SRO Japan Cup, an auto racing series for grand tourer cars in Japan, co-promoted by the SRO Motorsports Group and Team Asia One GT Management. The races were contested with GT3-spec, GTC-spec and GT4-spec cars with hopes of GT2-spec entries.

== Calendar ==
Round	Circuit	Date	Map of circuit locations
1	(Miyagi Prefecture) Sportsland SUGO, Murata, Miyagi	15–17 May	2026 SRO Japan Cup is located in Japan
2	(Shizuoka Prefecture) Fuji Speedway, Oyama, Shizuoka	10–12 July	2026 SRO Japan Cup is located in Japan
3	(Okayama Prefecture) Okayama International Circuit, Mimasaka, Okayama	28–30 August	2026 SRO Japan Cup is located in Japan
4	(Mie Prefecture) Suzuka International Racing Course, Suzuka, Mie	11–13 September	2026 SRO Japan Cup is located in Japan
Sources:			2026 SRO Japan Cup is located in Japan

== Entry list ==
Team	Car	Engine	No.	Drivers	Class	Rounds
GT3
(Japan) Hitotsuyama with Cornes Racing	Ferrari 296 GT3	Ferrari F163CE 3.0 L Turbo V6	1	(Japan) Shintaro Kawabata	PA	All
(Japan) Hitotsuyama with Cornes Racing	Ferrari 296 GT3	Ferrari F163CE 3.0 L Turbo V6	1	(Japan) Akihiro Tsuzuki	PA	All
(Japan) Bingo Racing with LM corsa	Porsche 911 GT3 R (992.2)	Porsche M97/80 4.2 L Flat-6	9	(Japan) Ukyo Sasahara	PA	All
(Japan) Bingo Racing with LM corsa	Porsche 911 GT3 R (992.2)	Porsche M97/80 4.2 L Flat-6	9	(Japan) Shinji Takei	PA	All
(Japan) The Spirit of FFF Racing	Lamborghini Huracán GT3 Evo 2	Lamborghini DGF 5.2 L V10	19	(Japan) Hiroshi Hamaguchi	Am	All
(Japan) The Spirit of FFF Racing	Lamborghini Huracán GT3 Evo 2	Lamborghini DGF 5.2 L V10	19	(Japan) Mineki Okura	Am	All
(Japan) Max Racing	Mercedes-AMG GT3 Evo	Mercedes-AMG M159 6.2 L V8	24	(Japan) Yuya Motojima	PA	All
(Japan) Max Racing	Mercedes-AMG GT3 Evo	Mercedes-AMG M159 6.2 L V8	24	(Japan) Yusaku Shibata	PA	All
(Japan) Fivestar with Team DreamDrive	Mercedes-AMG GT3 Evo	Mercedes-AMG M159 6.2 L V8	25	(Japan) Takashi Sano	PA	2, 4
(Japan) Fivestar with Team DreamDrive	Mercedes-AMG GT3 Evo	Mercedes-AMG M159 6.2 L V8	25	(Japan) Takuya Shirasaka	PA	2, 4
(Japan) AWD Racing	Audi R8 LMS Evo II	Audi DAR 5.2 L V10	27	(Japan) Jake Parsons (Note: Australian driver Jake Parsons and Canadian driver Jesse Swinimer are competing under the Japanese license.)	PA	All
(Japan) AWD Racing	Audi R8 LMS Evo II	Audi DAR 5.2 L V10	27	(Japan) Jesse Swinimer	PA	All
(Japan) Ponos Racing	Ferrari 296 GT3 Evo	Ferrari F163CE 3.0 L Turbo V6	45	(Japan) Yorikatsu Tsujiko	Am	All
(Japan) Ponos Racing	Ferrari 296 GT3 Evo	Ferrari F163CE 3.0 L Turbo V6	45	(Japan) Yusuke Yamasaki	Am	All
(Japan) CarGuy Racing	Ferrari 488 GT3 Evo 2020 (1 & 2); Ferrari 296 GT3 (4)	Ferrari F154CB 3.9 L Turbo V8 (1 & 2); Ferrari F163CE 3.0 L Turbo V6 (4)	66	(Japan) Kazuki Ota	Am	1–2, 4
(Japan) CarGuy Racing	Ferrari 488 GT3 Evo 2020 (1 & 2); Ferrari 296 GT3 (4)	Ferrari F154CB 3.9 L Turbo V8 (1 & 2); Ferrari F163CE 3.0 L Turbo V6 (4)	66	(Japan) Takeshi Kimura	Am	1
(Japan) CarGuy Racing	Ferrari 488 GT3 Evo 2020 (1 & 2); Ferrari 296 GT3 (4)	Ferrari F154CB 3.9 L Turbo V8 (1 & 2); Ferrari F163CE 3.0 L Turbo V6 (4)	66	(Japan) Takashi Toyoda	Am	2, 4
(Japan) Miracolo Tokyo	McLaren 720S GT3	McLaren M840T 4.0 L Turbo V8	88	(Japan) Tadao Uematsu	PA	All
(Japan) Miracolo Tokyo	McLaren 720S GT3	McLaren M840T 4.0 L Turbo V8	88	(Japan) Kenta Yamashita	PA	All
(Japan) K-tunes Racing	Chevrolet Corvette Z06 GT3.R (1 & 4); Lexus RC F GT3 (2); Ferrari 296 GT3 Evo (3)	Chevrolet LT6.R 5.5 L V8 (1 & 4); Toyota 2UR-GSE 5.4 L V8 (2); Ferrari F163CE 3.0 L Turbo V6 (3)	96	(Japan) Kazunori Suenaga	PA	All
(Japan) K-tunes Racing	Chevrolet Corvette Z06 GT3.R (1 & 4); Lexus RC F GT3 (2); Ferrari 296 GT3 Evo (3)	Chevrolet LT6.R 5.5 L V8 (1 & 4); Toyota 2UR-GSE 5.4 L V8 (2); Ferrari F163CE 3.0 L Turbo V6 (3)	96	(Japan) Sena Sakaguchi	PA	1, 4
(Japan) K-tunes Racing	Chevrolet Corvette Z06 GT3.R (1 & 4); Lexus RC F GT3 (2); Ferrari 296 GT3 Evo (3)	Chevrolet LT6.R 5.5 L V8 (1 & 4); Toyota 2UR-GSE 5.4 L V8 (2); Ferrari F163CE 3.0 L Turbo V6 (3)	96	(Japan) Nirei Fukuzumi	PA	2–3
(Japan) K-tunes Racing	Ferrari 296 GT3	Ferrari F163CE 3.0 L Turbo V6	97	(Chinese Taipei) Betty Chen Yin-yu	PA	All
(Japan) K-tunes Racing	Ferrari 296 GT3	Ferrari F163CE 3.0 L Turbo V6	97	(Japan) Shinichi Takagi	PA	All
(Japan) Norik Racing	Ferrari 296 GT3 Evo	Ferrari F163CE 3.0 L Turbo V6	181	(Japan) Taku Bamba	PA	All
(Japan) Norik Racing	Ferrari 296 GT3 Evo	Ferrari F163CE 3.0 L Turbo V6	181	(Japan) "Norik"	PA	All
(Japan) RunUp Sports	Nissan GT-R Nismo GT3	Nissan VR38DETT 3.8 L Turbo V6	360	(Japan) Masaaki Nishikawa	Am	1, 3
(Japan) RunUp Sports	Nissan GT-R Nismo GT3	Nissan VR38DETT 3.8 L Turbo V6	360	(Japan) Atsushi Tanaka	Am	1, 3
(Japan) Maezawa Racing	Ferrari 296 GT3 (1–2); Ferrari 296 GT3 Evo (3–4)	Ferrari F163CE 3.0 L Turbo V6	555	(Japan) Yusaku Maezawa	PA	All
(Japan) Maezawa Racing	Ferrari 296 GT3 (1–2); Ferrari 296 GT3 Evo (3–4)	Ferrari F163CE 3.0 L Turbo V6	555	(Japan) Naoki Yokomizo	PA	All
(Japan) GalahRacing	Nissan GT-R Nismo GT3	Nissan VR38DETT 3.8 L Turbo V6	935	(Japan) "Galah"	PA	2
(Japan) GalahRacing	Nissan GT-R Nismo GT3	Nissan VR38DETT 3.8 L Turbo V6	935	(Japan) Natsu Sakaguchi	PA	2
GT4
(Japan) Akiland Racing	Toyota GR Supra GT4 Evo2	BMW B58B30 3.0 L Turbo I6	11	(Japan) Yuji Kunimoto	PA	1, 3
(Japan) Akiland Racing	Toyota GR Supra GT4 Evo2	BMW B58B30 3.0 L Turbo I6	11	(Japan) Masayoshi Oyama	PA	1, 3
(Japan) Akiland Racing	Toyota GR Supra GT4 Evo2	BMW B58B30 3.0 L Turbo I6	11	(Japan) Masahiko Ida	Am	4
(Japan) Akiland Racing	Toyota GR Supra GT4 Evo2	BMW B58B30 3.0 L Turbo I6	11	(China) Wang Yang	Am	4
(Japan) E-Needs Racing	Toyota GR Supra GT4 Evo2	BMW B58B30 3.0 L Turbo I6	29	(Japan) Kota Murase	Am	2, 4
(Japan) E-Needs Racing	Toyota GR Supra GT4 Evo2	BMW B58B30 3.0 L Turbo I6	29	(Japan) Tatsuya Osaki	Am	2, 4
(Hong Kong) Pop Race	Mercedes-AMG GT4	Mercedes-AMG M178 4.0 L Turbo V8	44	(Hong Kong) Kelvin Ho Chun Ki	Am	All
(Hong Kong) Pop Race	Mercedes-AMG GT4	Mercedes-AMG M178 4.0 L Turbo V8	44	(Japan) Maaya Orido	Am	All
(Japan) Zenko RS Garage with Sunrise BLVD	Porsche 718 Cayman GT4 RS Clubsport	Porsche MDG.GA 4.0 L Flat-6	82	(Japan) Yoshimoto Makino	PA	All
(Japan) Zenko RS Garage with Sunrise BLVD	Porsche 718 Cayman GT4 RS Clubsport	Porsche MDG.GA 4.0 L Flat-6	82	(Japan) Takeshi Suehiro	PA	All

Icon	Class
Drivers
PA	Pro-Am Cup
S	Silver Cup
Am	Am Cup

- Kei Cozzolino was scheduled to compete for Ponos Racing, but Cozzolino left the team before the season starts. He was replaced by Yusuke Yamasaki, and the team competed in the Am class.

== Race results ==
Bold indicates overall winner for each car class (GT3 and GT4). In the Pole Position column, bold indicates the driver who set the qualifying lap.

GT3
Round		Circuit	Pole position	Pro/Am winners	Am winners
1	R1	SUGO	(Japan) No. 1 Hitotsuyama with Cornes Racing	**(Japan) No. 1 Hitotsuyama with Cornes Racing**	(Japan) No. 19 The Spirit of FFF Racing
1	R1	SUGO	(Japan) Shintaro Kawabata **(Japan) Akihiro Tsuzuki**	**(Japan) Shintaro Kawabata** **(Japan) Akihiro Tsuzuki**	(Japan) Hiroshi Hamaguchi (Japan) Mineki Okura
1	R2	SUGO	(Japan) No. 9 Bingo Racing with LM corsa	**(Japan) No. 9 Bingo Racing with LM corsa**	(Japan) No. 19 The Spirit of FFF Racing
1	R2	SUGO	**(Japan) Ukyo Sasahara** (Japan) Shinji Takei	**(Japan) Ukyo Sasahara** **(Japan) Shinji Takei**	(Japan) Hiroshi Hamaguchi (Japan) Mineki Okura
2	R1	Fuji	(Japan) No. 19 The Spirit of FFF Racing	**(Japan) No. 88 Miracolo Tokyo**	(Japan) No. 45 Ponos Racing
2	R1	Fuji	**(Japan) Hiroshi Hamaguchi** (Japan) Mineki Okura	**(Japan) Tadao Uematsu** **(Japan) Kenta Yamashita**	(Japan) Yorikatsu Tsujiko (Japan) Yusuke Yamasaki
2	R2	Fuji	(Japan) No. 1 Hitotsuyama with Cornes Racing	**(Japan) No. 1 Hitotsuyama with Cornes Racing**	(Japan) No. 19 The Spirit of FFF Racing
2	R2	Fuji	**(Japan) Shintaro Kawabata** (Japan) Akihiro Tsuzuki	**(Japan) Shintaro Kawabata** **(Japan) Akihiro Tsuzuki**	(Japan) Hiroshi Hamaguchi (Japan) Mineki Okura
3	R1	Okayama	(Japan) No. 24 Max Racing	(Japan) No. 24 Max Racing	(Japan) No. 19 The Spirit of FFF Racing
3	R1	Okayama	(Japan) Yuya Motojima **(Japan) Yusaku Shibata**	**(Japan) Yuya Motojima** **(Japan) Yusaku Shibata**	(Japan) Hiroshi Hamaguchi (Japan) Mineki Okura
3	R2	Okayama	(Japan) No. 96 K-tunes Racing	**(Japan) No. 96 K-tunes Racing**	(Japan) No. 45 Ponos Racing
3	R2	Okayama	**(Japan) Nirei Fukuzumi** (Japan) Kazunori Suenaga	**(Japan) Nirei Fukuzumi** **(Japan) Kazunori Suenaga**	(Japan) Yorikatsu Tsujiko (Japan) Yusuke Yamasaki
4	R1	Suzuka	(Japan) No. 45 Ponos Racing	**(Japan) No. 1 Hitotsuyama with Cornes Racing**	(Japan) No. 19 The Spirit of FFF Racing
4	R1	Suzuka	**(Japan) Yorikatsu Tsujiko** (Japan) Yusuke Yamasaki	**(Japan) Shintaro Kawabata** **(Japan) Akihiro Tsuzuki**	(Japan) Hiroshi Hamaguchi (Japan) Mineki Okura
4	R2	Suzuka	(Japan) No. 1 Hitotsuyama with Cornes Racing	**(Japan) No. 1 Hitotsuyama with Cornes Racing**	(Japan) No. 19 The Spirit of FFF Racing
4	R2	Suzuka	**(Japan) Shintaro Kawabata** (Japan) Akihiro Tsuzuki	**(Japan) Shintaro Kawabata** **(Japan) Akihiro Tsuzuki**	(Japan) Hiroshi Hamaguchi (Japan) Mineki Okura
GT4
Round		Circuit	Pole position	Silver/Am Winners	Am winners
1	R1	SUGO	(Japan) No. 82 Zenko RS Garage with Sunrise BLVD	**(Japan) No. 82 Zenko RS Garage with Sunrise BLVD**	(Hong Kong) No. 44 Team Pop Race
1	R1	SUGO	**(Japan) Yoshimoto Makino** (Japan) Takeshi Suehiro	**(Japan) Yoshimoto Makino** **(Japan) Takeshi Suehiro**	(Hong Kong) Kelvin Ho Chun Ki (Japan) Maaya Orido
1	R2	SUGO	(Japan) No. 82 Zenko RS Garage with Sunrise BLVD	**(Japan) No. 11 Akiland Racing**	No classified finishers
1	R2	SUGO	(Japan) Yoshimoto Makino **(Japan) Takeshi Suehiro**	**(Japan) Yuji Kunimoto** **(Japan) Masayoshi Oyama**	No classified finishers
2	R1	Fuji	(Japan) No. 82 Zenko RS Garage with Sunrise BLVD	**(Japan) No. 82 Zenko RS Garage with Sunrise BLVD**	(Hong Kong) No. 44 Team Pop Race
2	R1	Fuji	**(Japan) Yoshimoto Makino** (Japan) Takeshi Suehiro	**(Japan) Yoshimoto Makino** **(Japan) Takeshi Suehiro**	(Hong Kong) Kelvin Ho Chun Ki (Japan) Maaya Orido
2	R2	Fuji	(Japan) No. 82 Zenko RS Garage with Sunrise BLVD	**(Japan) No. 82 Zenko RS Garage with Sunrise BLVD**	(Japan) No. 29 E-Needs Racing
2	R2	Fuji	(Japan) Yoshimoto Makino **(Japan) Takeshi Suehiro**	**(Japan) Yoshimoto Makino** **(Japan) Takeshi Suehiro**	(Japan) Kota Murase (Japan) Tatsuya Osaki
3	R1	Okayama	(Japan) No. 82 Zenko RS Garage with Sunrise BLVD	**(Japan) No. 82 Zenko RS Garage with Sunrise BLVD**	(Hong Kong) No. 44 Team Pop Race
3	R1	Okayama	**(Japan) Yoshimoto Makino** (Japan) Takeshi Suehiro	**(Japan) Yoshimoto Makino** **(Japan) Takeshi Suehiro**	(Hong Kong) Kelvin Ho Chun Ki (Japan) Maaya Orido
3	R2	Okayama	(Japan) No. 82 Zenko RS Garage with Sunrise BLVD	**(Japan) No. 82 Zenko RS Garage with Sunrise BLVD**	(Hong Kong) No. 44 Team Pop Race
3	R2	Okayama	(Japan) Yoshimoto Makino **(Japan) Takeshi Suehiro**	**(Japan) Yoshimoto Makino** **(Japan) Takeshi Suehiro**	(Hong Kong) Kelvin Ho Chun Ki (Japan) Maaya Orido
4	R1	Suzuka	(Japan) No. 82 Zenko RS Garage with Sunrise BLVD	**(Japan) No. 82 Zenko RS Garage with Sunrise BLVD**	(Japan) No. 29 E-Needs Racing
4	R1	Suzuka	**(Japan) Yoshimoto Makino** (Japan) Takeshi Suehiro	**(Japan) Yoshimoto Makino** **(Japan) Takeshi Suehiro**	(Japan) Kota Murase (Japan) Tatsuya Osaki
4	R2	Suzuka	(Japan) No. 82 Zenko RS Garage with Sunrise BLVD	**(Japan) No. 82 Zenko RS Garage with Sunrise BLVD**	(Japan) No. 29 E-Needs Racing
4	R2	Suzuka	(Japan) Yoshimoto Makino **(Japan) Takeshi Suehiro**	**(Japan) Yoshimoto Makino** **(Japan) Takeshi Suehiro**	(Japan) Kota Murase (Japan) Tatsuya Osaki

== Championship standings ==
Scoring system

Championship points are awarded for the first ten positions in each race. Entries are required to complete 75% of the winning car's race distance in order to be classified and earn points. Individual drivers are required to participate for a minimum of 25 minutes in order to earn championship points in any race.

Position	**1st**	**2nd**	**3rd**	**4th**	**5th**	**6th**	**7th**	**8th**	**9th**	**10th**
Points	25	18	15	12	10	8	6	4	2	1

=== Drivers' championships ===
Pos.	Driver	Team	SUG		FUJ		OKA		SUZ		Points
GT3
1	(Japan) Shintaro Kawabata (Japan) Akihiro Tsuzuki	(Japan) Hitotsuyama with Cornes Racing	**1**	5	**Ret**	**1**	3	5	1	**1**	135
2	(Japan) Yuya Motojima (Japan) Yusaku Shibata	(Japan) Max Racing	2	2	2	2	**1**	6	2	4	135
3	(Japan) Tadao Uematsu (Japan) Kenta Yamashita	(Japan) Team Uematsu	3	3	1	4	13	3	3	2	116
4	(Japan) Ukyo Sasahara (Japan) Shinji Takei	(Japan) Bingo Racing with LM corsa	4	**1**	5	3	2	4	5	6	110
5	(Japan) Yusaku Maezawa (Japan) Naoki Yokomizo	(Japan) Maezawa racing	6	4	WD	WD	4	2	9	3	67
6	(Japan) Hiroshi Hamaguchi (Japan) Mineki Okura	(Japan) The Spirit of FFF Racing	5	6	**Ret**	5	6	8	4	5	62
7	(Japan) Yorikatsu Tsujiko (Japan) Yusuke Yamasaki	(Japan) Ponos Racing	10	8	7	6	8	7	**7**	7	41
8	(Japan) Kazunori Suenaga	(Japan) K-tunes Racing	WD	WD	Ret	10	Ret	**1**	6	8	38
9	(Japan) "Norik" (Japan) Taku Bamba	(Japan) Norik Racing	7	9	4	7	5	11	WD	WD	36
10	(Japan) Jake Parsons (Japan) Jesse Swinimer	(Japan) AWD Racing	9	7	3	8	Ret	10	8	11	32
11	(Japan) Nirei Fukuzumi	(Japan) K-tunes Racing			Ret	10	Ret	**1**			26
12	(Chinese Taipei) Betty Chen Yin-yu (Japan) Shinichi Takagi	(Japan) K-tunes Racing	8	Ret	6	9	7	9	WD	WD	22
13	(Japan) Sena Sakaguchi	(Japan) K-tunes Racing	WD	WD					6	8	12
14	(Japan) Kazuki Ota	(Japan) CarGuy Racing	11	Ret	8	12			11	9	6
14	(Japan) Takashi Toyoda	(Japan) CarGuy Racing			8	12			11	9	6
15	(Japan) Masaaki Nishikawa (Japan) Atsushi Tanaka	(Japan) RunUp Sports	12	10			11	14			3
16	(Japan) Takashi Sano (Japan) Takuya Shirasaka	(Japan) Fivestar with Team DreamDrive			13†	13			10	10	3
17	(Japan) "Galah" (Japan) Natsu Sakaguchi	(Japan) GalahRacing			9	11					2
—	(Japan) Takeshi Kimura	(Japan) CarGuy Racing	11	Ret							0
GT4
1	(Japan) Yoshimoto Makino (Japan) Takeshi Suehiro	(Japan) Zenko RS Garage with Sunrise BLVD	**13**	**12**	**10**	**14**	**9**	**12**	**12**	**12**	143
2	(Hong Kong) Kelvin Ho Chun Ki (Japan) Maaya Orido	(Hong Kong) Pop Race	15	Ret	11	16	12	15	14	Ret	93
3	(Japan) Yuji Kunimoto (Japan) Masayoshi Oyama	(Japan) Akiland Racing	14	11			10	13			79
4	(Japan) Kota Murase (Japan) Tatsuya Osaki	(Japan) E-Needs Racing			12	15			13	13	69
5	(Japan) Masahiko Ida (China) Wang Yang	(Japan) Akiland Racing							15	14	27
Pos.	Driver	Team	SUG		FUJ		OKA		SUZ		Points

Colour	Result
Gold	Winner
Silver	Second place
Bronze	Third place
Green	Points classification
Blue	Non-points classification
Blue	Non-classified finish (NC)
Purple	Retired, not classified (Ret)
Red	Did not qualify (DNQ)
Red	Did not pre-qualify (DNPQ)
Black	Disqualified (DSQ)
White	Did not start (DNS)
White	Withdrew (WD)
White	Race cancelled (C)
Blank	Did not practice (DNP)
Blank	Did not arrive (DNA)
Blank	Excluded (EX)

**Bold** – Pole

Italics – Fastest Lap

Notes:

- † – Drivers did not finish the race, but were classified as they completed more than 90% of the race distance.

==== Pro-Am Cup ====
Pos.	Driver	Team	SUG		FUJ		OKA		SUZ		Points
GT3
1	(Japan) Shintaro Kawabata (Japan) Akihiro Tsuzuki	(Japan) Hitotsuyama with Cornes Racing	**1**	5	**Ret**	**1**	3	5	1	**1**	135
2	(Japan) Yuya Motojima (Japan) Yusaku Shibata	(Japan) Max Racing	2	2	2	2	**1**	6	**2**	4	135
3	(Japan) Tadao Uematsu (Japan) Kenta Yamashita	(Japan) Team Uematsu	3	3	1	4	9	3	3	2	121
4	(Japan) Ukyo Sasahara (Japan) Shinji Takei	(Japan) Bingo Racing with LM corsa	4	**1**	5	3	2	4	4	5	114
5	(Japan) Yusaku Maezawa (Japan) Naoki Yokomizo	(Japan) Maezawa racing	5	4	WD	WD	4	2	8	3	71
6	(Japan) Jake Parsons (Japan) Jesse Swinimer	(Japan) AWD Racing	8	6	3	6	Ret	8	6	7	53
7	(Japan) "Norik" (Japan) Taku Bamba	(Japan) Norik Racing	6	7	4	5	5	9	WD	WD	48
8	(Japan) Kazunori Suenaga	(Japan) K-tunes Racing	WD	WD	Ret	8	Ret	**1**	5	6	47
9	(Chinese Taipei) Betty Chen Yin-yu (Japan) Shinichi Takagi	(Japan) K-tunes Racing	7	Ret	6	7	6	7	WD	WD	34
10	(Japan) Nirei Fukuzumi	(Japan) K-tunes Racing			Ret	8	Ret	**1**			29
11	(Japan) Sena Sakaguchi	(Japan) K-tunes Racing	WD	WD					5	6	18
12	(Japan) "Galah" (Japan) Natsu Sakaguchi	(Japan) GalahRacing			7	9					8
GT4
1	(Japan) Yoshimoto Makino (Japan) Takeshi Suehiro	(Japan) Zenko RS Garage with Sunrise BLVD	**9**	**9**	**8**	**10**	**7**	**10**	**8**	**8**	168
2	(Japan) Yuji Kunimoto (Japan) Masayoshi Oyama	(Japan) Akiland Racing	10	8			8	11			79
Pos.	Driver	Team	SUG		FUJ		OKA		SUZ		Points

==== Am Cup ====
Pos.	Driver	Team	SUG		FUJ		OKA		SUZ		Points
GT3
1	(Japan) Hiroshi Hamaguchi (Japan) Mineki Okura	(Japan) The Spirit of FFF Racing	**1**	**1**	**Ret**	**1**	1	**2**	1	**1**	168
2	(Japan) Yorikatsu Tsujiko (Japan) Yusuke Yamasaki	(Japan) Ponos Racing	2	2	1	2	**2**	1	**2**	2	158
3	(Japan) Kazuki Ota	(Japan) CarGuy Racing	3	Ret	2	3			4	3	75
4	(Japan) Takashi Toyoda	(Japan) CarGuy Racing			2	3			4	3	60
5	(Japan) Masaaki Nishikawa (Japan) Atsushi Tanaka	(Japan) RunUp Sports	4	3			3	3			57
6	(Japan) Takashi Sano (Japan) Takuya Shirasaka	(Japan) Fivestar with Team DreamDrive			5†	4			3	4	54
7	(Japan) Takeshi Kimura	(Japan) CarGuy Racing	3	Ret							15
GT4
1	(Hong Kong) Kelvin Ho Chun Ki (Japan) Maaya Orido	(Hong Kong) Pop Race	**5**	**Ret**	**3**	6	**4**	**4**	6	Ret	136
2	(Japan) Kota Murase (Japan) Tatsuya Osaki	(Japan) E-Needs Racing			4	**5**			**5**	**5**	93
3	(Japan) Masahiko Ida (China) Wang Yang	(Japan) Akiland Racing							7	6	33
Pos.	Driver	Team	SUG		FUJ		OKA		SUZ		Points

=== Teams' Championship ===
Pos.	Team	SUG		FUJ		OKA		SUZ		Points
GT3
1	(Japan) Hitotsuyama with Cornes Racing	1	5	Ret	1	3	5	1	1	135
2	(Japan) Max Racing	2	2	2	2	1	6	2	4	135
3	(Japan) Miracolo Tokyo	3	3	1	4	13	3	3	2	126
4	(Japan) Bingo Racing with LM corsa	4	1	5	3	2	4	5	7	108
5	(Japan) Maezawa racing	6	4	WD	WD	4	2	9	3	67
6	(Japan) The Spirit of FFF Racing	5	6	Ret	5	6	8	4	5	62
7	(Japan) K-tunes Racing	8	Ret	6	9	7	1	6	8	60
7	(Japan) K-tunes Racing	WD	WD	Ret	10	Ret	9	WD	WD	60
8	(Japan) Ponos Racing	10	8	7	6	8	7	7	6	43
9	(Japan) Norik Racing	7	9	5	7	5	11	WD	WD	34
10	(Japan) AWD Racing	9	7	3	8	Ret	10	8	11	32
11	(Japan) CarGuy Racing	11	Ret	8	12			11	9	6
12	(Japan) RunUp Sports	12	10			11	14			3
13	(Japan) Fivestar with Team DreamDrive			13	13			10	10	3
14	(Japan) GalahRacing			9	11					2
GT4
1	(Japan) Zenko RS Garage with Sunrise BLVD	13	12	10	14	9	11	12	12	168
2	(Japan) Akiland Racing	14	11			10	13	15	14	106
3	(Hong Kong) Pop Race	15	Ret	11	16	12	15	14	Ret	93
4	(Japan) E-Needs Racing			12	15			13	13	69
Pos.	Team	SUG		FUJ		OKA		SUZ		Points

== See also ==
- 2026 British GT Championship
- 2026 GT World Challenge Europe
- 2026 GT World Challenge Europe Endurance Cup
- 2026 GT World Challenge Europe Sprint Cup
- 2026 GT World Challenge America
- 2026 GT World Challenge Australia
- 2026 Intercontinental GT Challenge
