= Sho Tsuboi =

Japanese racing driver (born 1995)

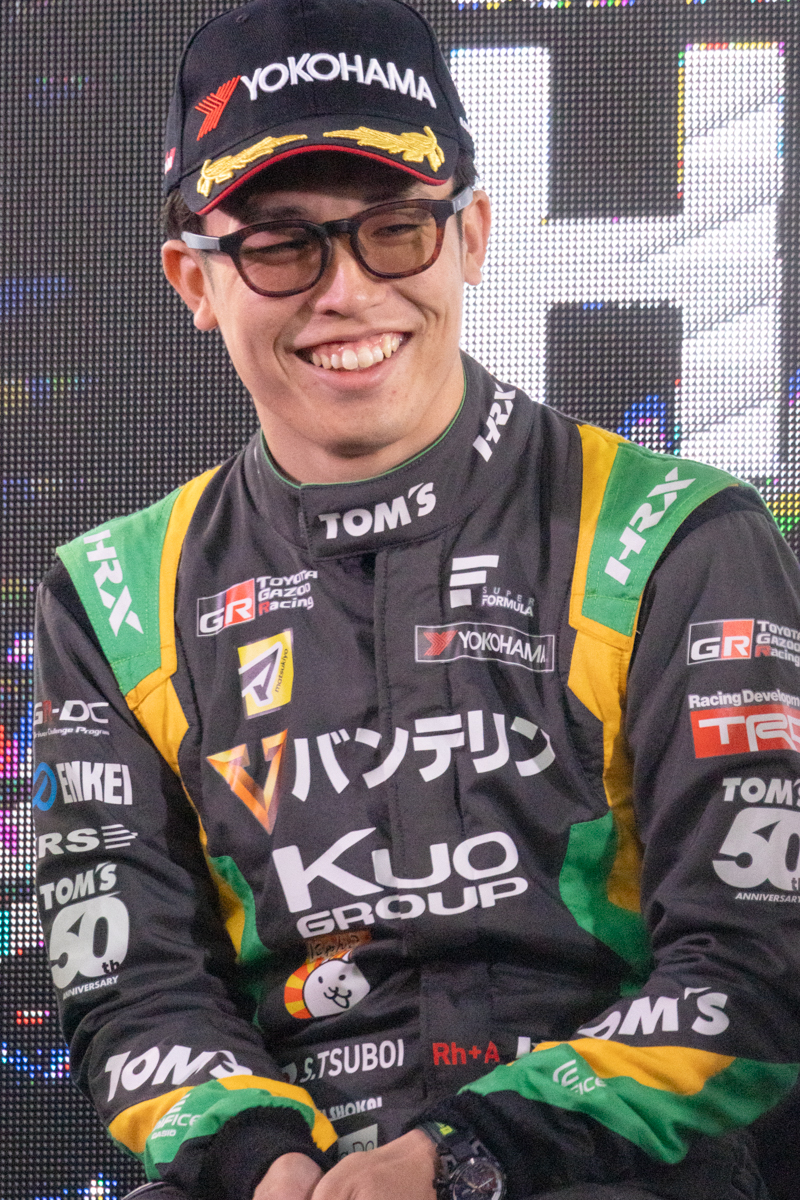
- Tsuboi at Suzuka Circuit in November 2024
- Nationality: (Japan) Japanese
- Born: 21 May 1995 (age 31) Kawagoe, Saitama, Japan

Super GT - GT500 career
- Debut season: 2019
- Current team: TGR Team au TOM'S
- Categorisation: FIA Platinum
- Car number: 1
- Former teams: Rookie Racing, Racing Project Bandoh, SARD
- Starts: 69
- Wins: 12
- Podiums: 22
- Poles: 3
- Fastest laps: 5
- Best finish: 1st in 2021, 2023, 2024, 2025

Super Formula career
- Debut season: 2019
- Current team: Vantelin Team TOM'S
- Car number: 36
- Former teams: Cerumo・INGING
- Starts: 68
- Wins: 7
- Podiums: 22
- Poles: 4
- Fastest laps: 5
- Best finish: 1st in 2024

Previous series
- 2017-18 2016-18 2015 2012-13: Super GT - GT300; Japanese Formula Three; F4 Japanese Championship; Formula Challenge Japan

Championship titles
- 2024 2021, 23-25 2018 2015: Super Formula; Super GT - GT500; Japanese Formula 3 Championship; F4 Japanese Championship

Sho Tsuboi (坪井 翔, Tsuboi Shō; born 21 May 1995) is a Japanese racing driver for Toyota Gazoo Racing and TOM'S Racing, who currently competes in the Super GT Series GT500 class and Super Formula Championship.

Tsuboi is a four-time Super GT GT500 champion in 2021, 2023, 2024 and 2025, sharing the all-time GT500 championships record with Ronnie Quintarelli. He won the Super Formula Championship in 2024, as well as the title in the 2015 F4 Japanese Championship and 2018 Japanese Formula 3 Championship.

== Career ==
=== Early career ===
Tsuboi began his single-seater racing career in 2012 and drove for two years in Formula Challenge Japan. He finished seventh in the standings in 2012, and fifth in 2013, with two race victories.

Following the closure of Formula Challenge Japan, Tsuboi raced in the 2014 JAF Formula 4 regional championship series, finishing second in the FC class championship. That same year, he officially joined the Toyota Young Driver Program (TDP).

In 2015, Tsuboi made his debut in the inaugural FIA F4 Japanese Championship with the TOM'S Spirit team. He won seven races, and won the championship by just three points ahead of Tadasuke Makino.

=== Formula 3 ===
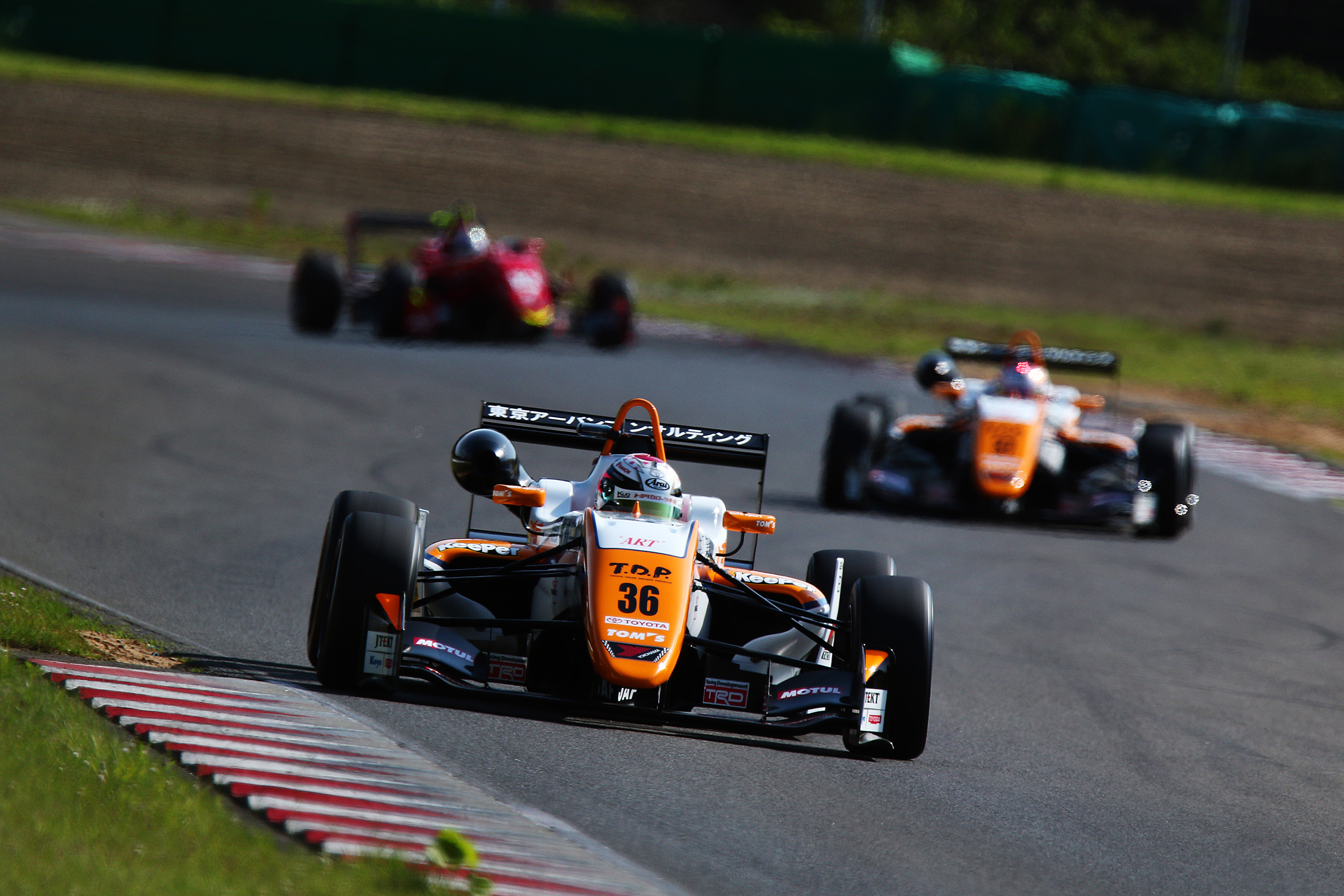
Tsuboi racing at Sportsland Sugo during his championship-winning 2018 Japanese Formula 3 season

In 2016, Tsuboi entered the Japanese Formula 3 Championship with TOM'S. Despite not winning a race, he finished third in the championship with 15 podiums in 17 races.

In 2017, Tsuboi won his first race, and won eight of the last ten races to finish second in the championship.

Tsuboi won the championship title in 2018, his third season. Tsuboi set a Japanese F3 record with 17 victories in 19 races, finishing second in the other two races that he did not win.

Tsuboi made three starts in the Macau Grand Prix FIA Formula 3 World Cup between 2016 and 2018. He finished 16th in 2016, and 14th in 2017.

In the 2018 race, Tsuboi and German racing driver Sophia Flörsch were involved in a serious accident. Tsuboi escaped serious injury after Flörsch's car became airborne from contact with Jehan Daruvala. Tsuboi and Flörsch were hospitalized.

=== Super GT ===
==== GT300 (2017-2018) ====
Tsuboi drove in the GT300 class of the Japanese Super GT Series from 2017 to 2018. He made his debut for JMS P.mu LM Corsa, driving a Lexus RC F GT3. He finished third in the 2017 GT300 standings, winning the Fuji 500 km and the overseas race at Chang International Circuit. In 2018, he drove for Tsuchiya Engineering in their Toyota 86 MC, and finished seventh in the championship with two podiums.

==== GT500 (2018-) ====
Tsuboi made a one-off GT500 debut for Lexus Team SARD in the 2018 Fuji 500 km, finishing second in his first race aboard the Lexus LC 500. In 2019, Tsuboi secured his full-time GT500 debut with Lexus Team WedsSport Bandoh. Tsuboi and Yuji Kunimoto finished eleventh in the championship, scoring a third place podium finish at Chang International Circuit.

In 2020, Tsuboi moved to the brand new ROOKIE Racing team (TGR Team Wako's ROOKIE), driving the new Toyota GR Supra GT500. Alongside reigning GT500 champion Kazuya Oshima, Tsuboi scored back to back podium finishes to open the 2020 season. They finished the year seventh in the championship, recording a best finish of second at the fifth round at Fuji Speedway.

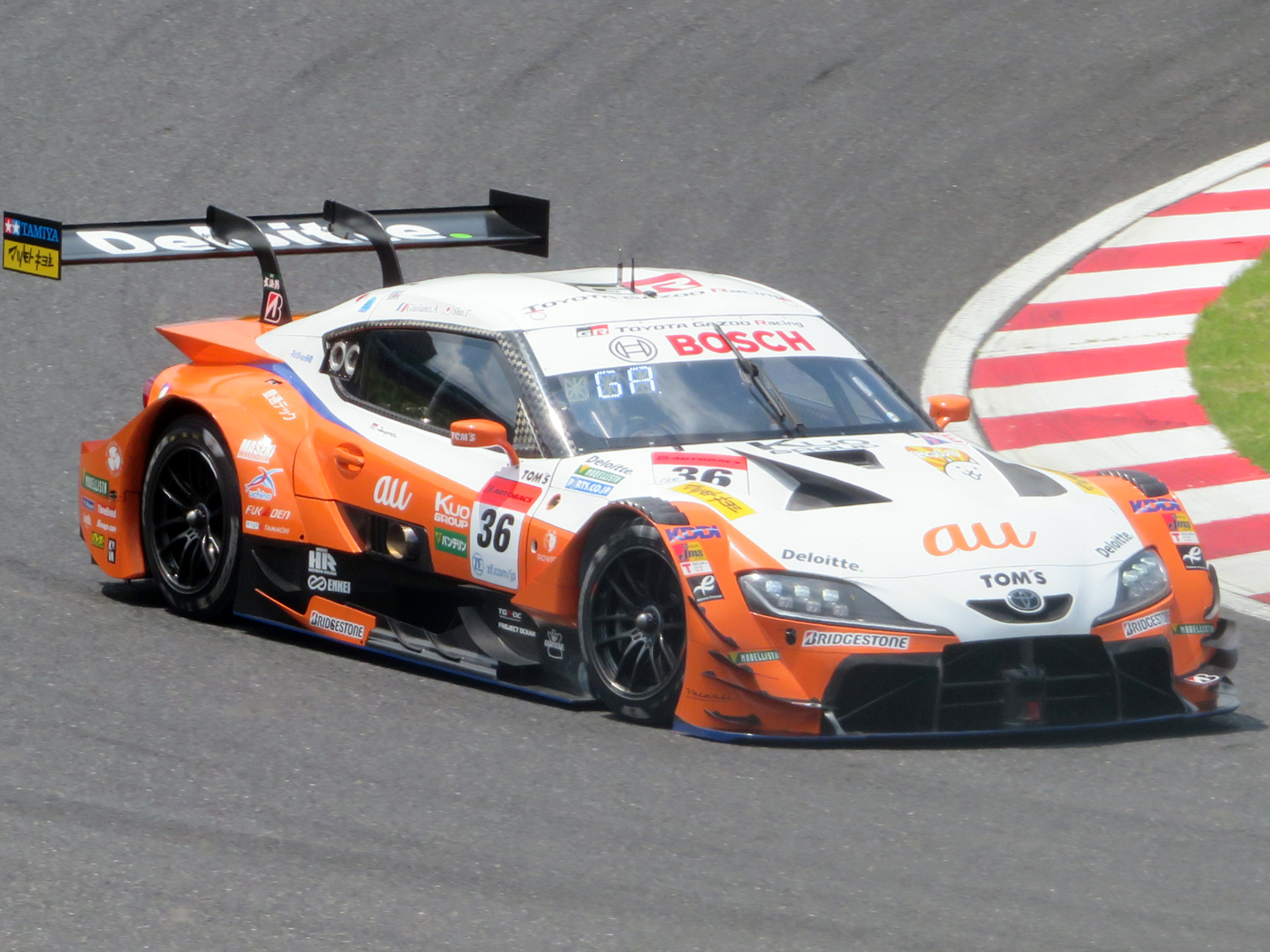
Tsuboi driving the TGR Team au TOM'S Toyota GR Supra GT500 at Suzuka

Tsuboi changed teams once again in 2021, joining TGR Team au TOM'S, alongside Yuhi Sekiguchi. Tsuboi finished second in the opening round at Okayama International Circuit, battling Kenta Yamashita for the lead for several laps. Heading into the final round at Fuji Speedway, Tsuboi and Sekiguchi trailed championship leader Naoki Yamamoto by 16 points. Tsuboi went on to win the race for his first career GT500 class victory. Yamamoto was taken out from a championship-clinching position after GT300 driver Ren Sato crashed into his car with 15 laps remaining, which ultimately secured the championship for Tsuboi and Sekiguchi.

For 2022, Sekiguchi was replaced by GT500 newcomer Giuliano Alesi, but the new combination of Tsuboi and Alesi only recorded one podium finish. In 2023, Ritomo Miyata transferred from the number 37 TOM'S team to join Tsuboi. The pair won the Golden Week Fuji 450 km race, finished second in the spring race at Suzuka, then reeled off back-to-back wins at Autopolis and Mobility Resort Motegi to clinch the championship by a whopping 29-point final margin.

Tsuboi raced with his sixth different co-driver in as many seasons in 2024 after Kenta Yamashita replaced Miyata for 2024. He became the first driver in GT500 history to win three consecutive championship races after winning the first round at Okayama. He won again the GT500 title along with Super Formula title would make him the sixth driver to win both series. Both Tsuboi and Yamashita stayed as both raced with the no. 1 car.

In 2025, with his record-tying fourth Super GT championship win and second place Super Formula win, Tsuboi was ranked #19 in Autosport Magazine's Top 50 drivers of 2025.

=== Super Formula ===
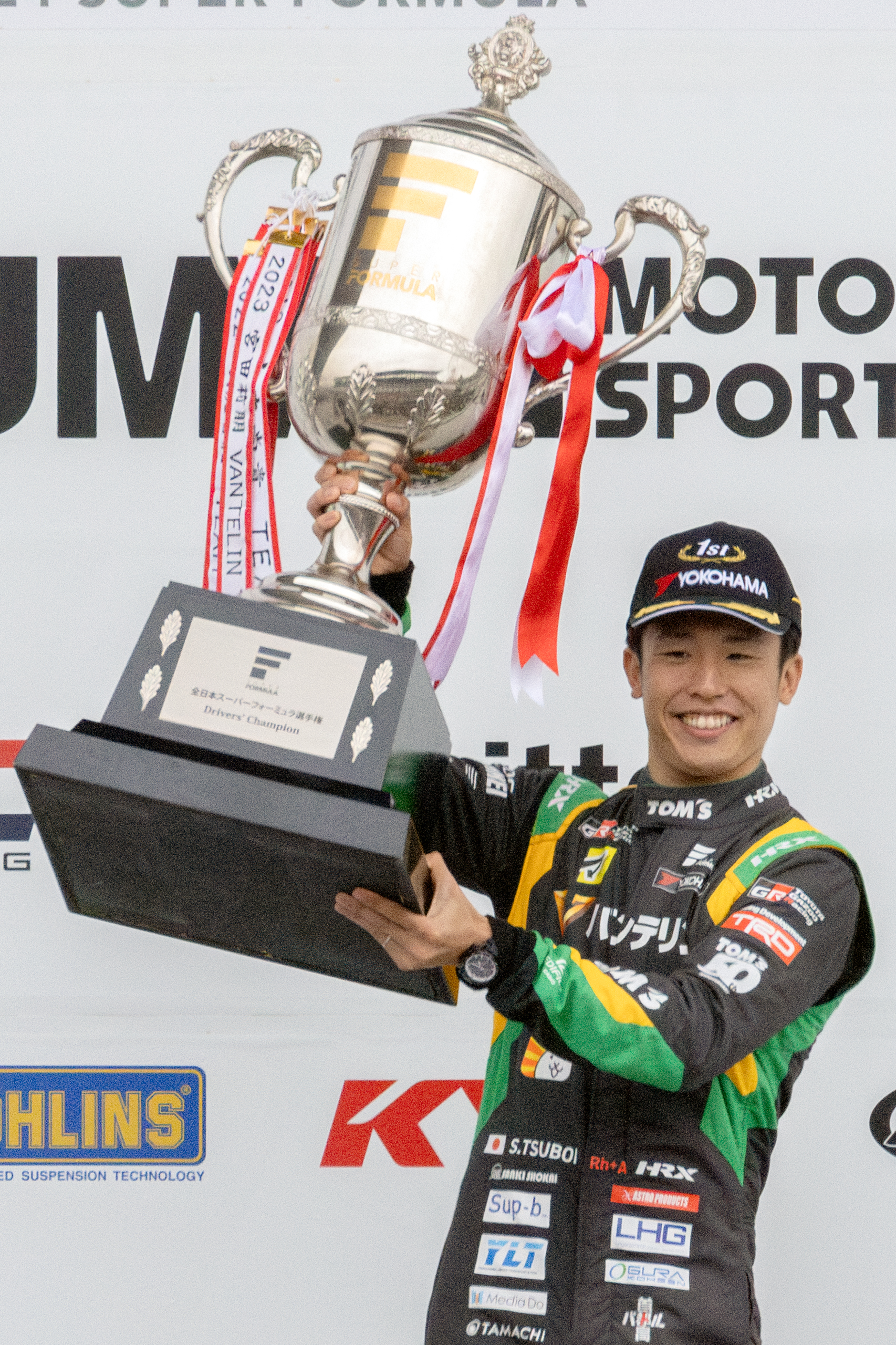
Tsuboi after winning the 2024 Super Formula Driver's Championship

After his record-setting 2018 Japanese F3 campaign, Tsuboi made the step up to the Super Formula Championship in 2019, joining JMS P.mu/Cerumo-INGING. He recorded a best finish of second in a wet race at Fuji Speedway. Tsuboi finished 12th in the championship, and was third in the Rookie of the Year cup behind Álex Palou.

Tsuboi improved to third in the championship in 2020. He won his first race in the second round at Okayama, and then went on to win the final race of the season at Fuji. He finished the season with 50 points, just twelve points behind eventual series champion Naoki Yamamoto.

However, Tsuboi slumped to 15th in the standings in 2021, only managing to score six points with a best finish of seventh at Suzuka.

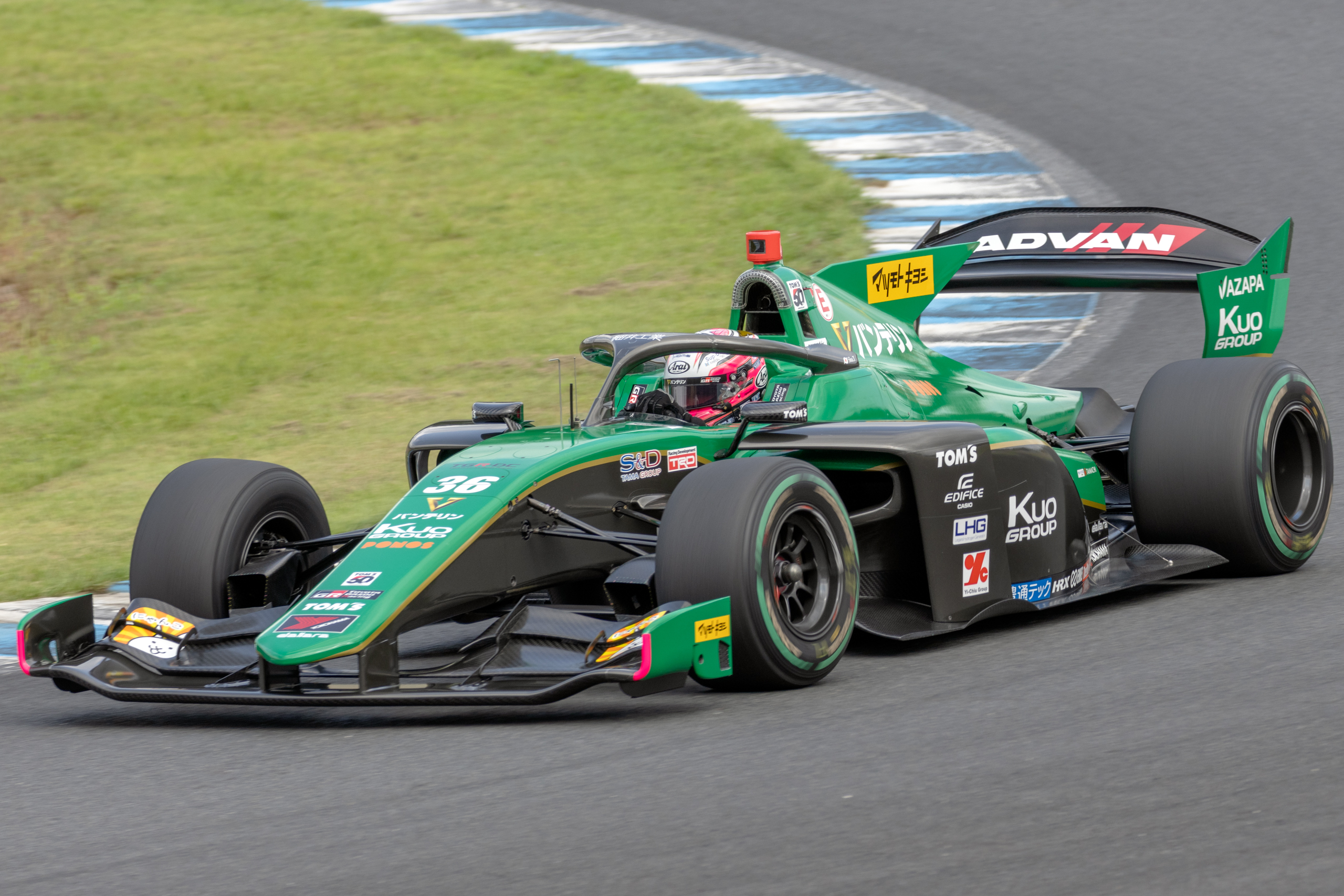
Tsuboi driving the Dallara SF23 during his 2024 Super Formula Championship-winning season

After five seasons at Cerumo-INGING, Tsuboi moved to Vantelin Team TOM'S in 2024 to replace his former Super GT co-driver Ritomo Miyata. Tsuboi won his first Super Formula driver's championship, with three race wins and seven podiums to his name as he beat both Tadasuke Makino and former champion Tomoki Nojiri.

Tsuboi stayed with TOM'S for 2025 and raced under the No. 1 car as the defending champion. He finished as the championship runner-up with two race wins and three podium finishes.

== Formula One ==
In August 2025, Tsuboi would drive a Formula One car for the first time at the Fuji Speedway with the Haas F1 Team, driving the Haas VF-23 as part of the Testing of Previous Cars (TPC) programme.

== Personal life ==
Tsuboi is the husband of 2024 Kyojo Cup champion Aimi Saito.

== Racing record ==
=== Career summary ===
Season	Series	Team	Races	Wins	Poles	F/Laps	Podiums	Points	Position
2012	Formula Challenge Japan	FTRS TMC	12	0	0	0	0	7	7th
2013	Formula Challenge Japan	FTRS TMC FCJ	12	2	0	1	3	36	5th
2014	JAF Formula 4 – West Series FC	Bijin&LTV Field FTRS	6	1	2	3	5	85	**2nd**
2014	JAF Formula 4 – East Series FC	Bijin&LTV Field FTRS	5	0	1	1	2	43	5th
2015	F4 Japanese Championship	TOM'S Spirit	14	7	4	3	10	195	**1st**
2016	Japanese Formula 3 Championship	Team TOM'S	17	0	0	1	15	87	**3rd**
2016	Macau Grand Prix	Team TOM'S	1	0	0	0	0	N/A	16th
2017	Japanese Formula 3 Championship	Team TOM'S	20	9	8	4	15	140	**2nd**
2017	Macau Grand Prix	Team TOM'S	1	0	0	0	0	N/A	14th
2017	Super GT - GT300	LM corsa	8	2	0	0	2	61	**3rd**
2017	Super Taikyu - ST-4	TOM'S Spirit	5	5	4	3	5	135‡	**1st‡**
2018	Japanese Formula 3 Championship	Team TOM'S	19	17	14	16	19	214	**1st**
2018	Macau Grand Prix	Team TOM'S	1	0	0	0	0	N/A	16th
2018	Super GT - GT500	Team SARD	1	0	0	0	1	15	16th
2018	Super GT - GT300	Tsuchiya Engineering	7	0	2	1	2	39	7th
2018	Super Taikyu - ST-4	TOM'S Spirit	6	4	5	2	5	159‡	**1st‡**
2019	Super Formula	JMS P.mu/cerumo・INGING	7	0	0	0	1	12	11th
2019	Super GT - GT500	Team WedsSport Bandoh	8	0	2	0	1	27.5	11th
2019	Super Taikyu - ST-4	TOM'S Spirit	6	2	5	1	4	123.5‡	**2nd‡**
2020	Super Formula	JMS P.mu/cerumo・INGING	7	2	0	0	2	50	**3rd**
2020	Super GT - GT500	TGR Team Wako's ROOKIE	8	0	2	0	3	47	7th
2020	Super Taikyu - ST-4	C.S.I Racing	5	3	3	3	4	129‡	**1st‡**
2021	Super Formula	P.mu/cerumo・INGING	7	0	0	0	0	6	15th
2021	Super GT - GT500	TGR Team au TOM'S	8	1	0	1	3	64	**1st**
2021	Super Taikyu - ST-4	C.S.I Racing	6	2	5	4	5	129.5‡	**2nd‡**
2022	Super Formula	P.mu/cerumo・INGING	10	0	0	0	1	30	11th
2022	Super GT - GT500	TGR Team au TOM'S	8	0	0	1	1	29.5	10th
2022	Super Taikyu - ST-Z	Corolla Shin-Ibaraki CSIRacing	5	1	1	1	2	107‡	**3rd‡**
2022	Super Taikyu - ST-Z	My Cars CSIRacing	2	0	0	0	2	107‡	**3rd‡**
2023	Super Formula	P.mu/cerumo・INGING	9	0	1	1	3	59	4th
2023	Super GT - GT500	TGR Team au TOM'S	8	3	1	1	4	89	**1st**
2023	Super Taikyu - ST-4	TOM'S Spirit	6	1	0	6	5	100.5‡	**3rd‡**
2023	TGR GR86/BRZ Cup	Spread	2	0	0	0	0	8	19th
2024	Super Formula	Vantelin Team TOM'S	9	3	1	2	7	117.5	**1st**
2024	Super GT - GT500	TGR Team au TOM'S	8	3	2	1	3	97	**1st**
2024	Super Taikyu - ST-Q	ORC ROOKIE Racing	5	0	1	0	1	N/A‡	NC‡
2025	Super GT - GT500	TGR Team au TOM'S	8	3	0	1	4	80.5	**1st**
2025	Super Formula	Vantelin Team TOM'S	12	2	1	3	5	119.5	**2nd**
2025	Super Taikyu - ST-Q	Toyota Gazoo Rookie Racing						N/A‡	NC‡
2025	Nürburgring Langstrecken-Serie - SP8T	KCMG							
2026	Super GT - GT500	TGR Team au TOM'S	8	2	0	0	2	62	**3rd**
2026	Super Formula	Vantelin Team TOM'S	10	0	0	1	2	43	7th*
2026	Nürburgring Langstrecken-Serie - SP9	KCMG							
2026	Super Taikyu - ST-Q	GR Team ORC Field							

^{*} Season still in progress. ‡ Team standings.

=== Complete Formula Challenge Japan results ===
(key) (Races in bold indicate pole position) (Races in italics indicate fastest lap)

Year	Team	1	2	3	4	5	6	7	8	9	10	11	12	DC	Pts
2012	FTRS Scholarship	FUJ1; 1; 11	FUJ1; 2; 7	MOT; 1; 12	MOT; 2; 12	FUJ2; 1; 13	FUJ2; 2; 5	FUJ2; 3; 10	SUZ1; 1; 13	SUZ1; 2 Ret	SUZ2; 1; 5	SUZ2; 2; 4	SUZ2; 3; 18	7th	7
2013	FTRS Scholarship	FUJ1; 1; 1	FUJ1; 2; 7	MOT; 1; 6	MOT; 2; 7	FUJ2; 1; 6	FUJ2; 2; 7	FUJ2; 3; 5	FUJ3; 1; 3	FUJ3; 2; 1	SUZ; 1; 4	SUZ; 2; 6	SUZ; 3; 5	5th	36

=== Complete F4 Japanese Championship results ===
(key) (Races in bold indicate pole position) (Races in italics indicate fastest lap)

Year	Team	1	2	3	4	5	6	7	8	9	10	11	12	13	14	DC	Pts
2015	TOM'S Spirit	OKA; 1; 2	OKA; 2; 2	FUJ1; 1; 1	FUJ1; 2; 9	FUJ2; 1; 4	FUJ2; 2; 1	**SUZ**; **1**; 1	SUZ; 2; 1	**SUG**; **1**; 1	**SUG**; **2**; 1	AUT; 1; 1	AUT; 2; 17	MOT; 1; 5	MOT; 2; 2	1st	195

=== Complete Japanese Formula 3 Championship results ===
(key) (Races in bold indicate pole position) (Races in italics indicate fastest lap)

Year	Team	Engine	1	2	3	4	5	6	7	8	9	10	11	12	13	14	15	16	17	18	19	20	21	DC	Pts
2016	Team TOM'S	Toyota	SUZ; 1; 3	SUZ; 2; 2	FUJ; 1; 3	FUJ; 2; 3	OKA; 1; 2	OKA; 2; 3	SUZ; 1; 2	SUZ; 2 DNS	FUJ; 1; 2	FUJ; 2; 3	MOT; 1; 3	MOT; 2; 3	OKA; 1; 3	OKA; 2; 4	SUG; 1; 3	SUG; 2; 3	SUG; 3; 3					3rd	87
2017	Team TOM'S	Toyota	OKA; 1; 2	OKA; 2; 9	OKA; 3; 5	SUZ; 1; 3	SUZ; 2; 9	FUJ; 1; 7	FUJ; 2; 2	OKA; 1; 3	OKA; 2; 3	**SUZ**; **1**; 1	**SUZ**; **2**; 1	**FUJ**; **1** Ret	**FUJ**; **2**; 1	**MOT**; **1**; 1	**MOT**; **2**; 1	MOT; 3; 1	**AUT**; **1**; 1	**AUT**; **2**; 1	SUG; 1; 1	SUG; 2; 2		2nd	140
2018	Team TOM'S	Toyota	SUZ; 1; 1	**SUZ**; **2**; 1	**SUG**; **1**; 1	**SUG**; **2**; 1	**FUJ**; **1**; 1	**FUJ**; **2**; 2	OKA; 1; 2	**OKA**; **2**; 1	OKA; 3 C	**MOT**; **1**; 1	**MOT**; **2**; 1	MOT; 3; 1	**OKA**; **1**; 1	**OKA**; **2**; 1	OKA; 3 C	**SUG**; **1**; 1	**SUG**; **2**; 1	SUG; 3; 1	SUG; 4; 1	**FUJ**; **1**; 1	**FUJ**; **2**; 1	1st	214

=== Complete Super GT results ===
(key) (Races in bold indicate pole position) (Races in italics indicate fastest lap)

Year	Team	Car	Class	1	2	3	4	5	6	7	8	9	DC	Points
2017	LM corsa	Lexus RC F GT3	GT300	OKA; 8	FUJ; 1	AUT; 6	SUG; 13	FUJ; 9	SUZ; 6	CHA; 1	MOT; 6		3rd	61
2018	Tsuchiya Engineering	Toyota 86 MC	GT300	OKA; 3		SUZ; 2	CHA; 19	**FUJ**; 5	SUG; 24	**AUT**; 24	MOT; 8		7th	39
2018	Lexus Team SARD	Lexus LC 500	GT500		FUJ; 2								16th	15
2019	Lexus Team WedsSport Bandoh	Lexus LC 500	GT500	OKA; 6‡	FUJ; 13	SUZ; 7	CHA; 3	FUJ; 9	AUT; 8	SUG; 13	MOT; 7		11th	27.5
2020	TGR Team Wako's ROOKIE	Toyota GR Supra	GT500	FUJ; 3	FUJ; 3	SUZ; 9	MOT; 4	FUJ; 2	SUZ; 12	MOT; 12	FUJ; Ret		7th	47
2021	TGR Team au TOM'S	Toyota GR Supra	GT500	OKA; 2	FUJ; 13	MOT; 3	SUZ; 5	SUG; 4	AUT; 10	MOT; 8	FUJ; 1		1st	64
2022	TGR Team au TOM'S	Toyota GR Supra	GT500	OKA; 6	FUJ; 2‡	SUZ; 10	FUJ; 4	SUZ; 9	SUG; 10	AUT; 8	MOT; 9		10th	29.5
2023	TGR Team au TOM'S	Toyota GR Supra	GT500	OKA; 15	FUJ; 1	**SUZ**; 2	FUJ; 4	SUZ; 10	SUG; 7	AUT; 1	MOT; 1		1st	89
2024	TGR Team au TOM'S	Toyota GR Supra	GT500	**OKA**; 1	FUJ; 4	SUZ; 5	FUJ; 7	SUG; 4	AUT; 7	MOT; 1^{3}	**SUZ**; 1		1st	97
2025	TGR Team au TOM'S	Toyota GR Supra GT500	GT500	OKA; 1	FUJ; 2	SEP; 7	FS1; 1	FS2 (2)	SUZ; 9	SUG; 9	AUT; 13†	MOT; 1	1st	80.5
2026	TGR Team au TOM'S	Toyota GR Supra GT500	GT500	OKA; 1	FUJ; 1	FUJ; 4	SUZ; 9	SUG; 4	AUT; 8	MOT; 10	MOT; 13		3rd	62

^{‡} Half points awarded as less than 75% of race distance was completed. ^{(Number)} Driver did not take part in this sprint race, points are still awarded for the teammate's result. ^{†} Driver did not finish, but was classified as he completed over 90% of the race distance.

=== Complete Super Formula results ===
(key) (Races in bold indicate pole position) (Races in italics indicate fastest lap)

Year	Team	Engine	1	2	3	4	5	6	7	8	9	10	11	12	DC	Points
2019	JMS P.mu/cerumo・INGING	Toyota	SUZ; 5	AUT; 12	SUG; Ret	FUJ; 2	MOT; 17	OKA; 11	SUZ; 10						11th	12
2020	JMS P.mu/cerumo・INGING	Toyota	MOT; Ret	OKA; 1	SUG; 13	AUT; Ret	SUZ; Ret	SUZ; 4	FUJ; 1^{2}						3rd	50
2021	P.mu/cerumo・INGING	Toyota	FUJ; Ret	SUZ; 7	AUT; Ret	SUG; 15	MOT; 9	MOT; Ret	SUZ; 16						15th	6
2022	P.mu/cerumo・INGING	Toyota	FUJ; 8	FUJ; 12	SUZ; 20	AUT; 13	SUG; 11	FUJ; 2^{2}	MOT; 5	MOT; 10	SUZ; 8	SUZ; 12			11th	30
2023	P.mu/cerumo・INGING	Toyota	FUJ; Ret	FUJ; 2	SUZ; 2^{2}	**AUT**; 3^{1}	SUG; 7	FUJ; 11	MOT; Ret	SUZ; 5‡	SUZ; 5				4th	59
2024	Vantelin Team TOM'S	Toyota	SUZ; 11	AUT; 3	SUG; 3‡^{3}	FUJ; 1	MOT; 5	FUJ; 1	**FUJ**; 1^{1}	SUZ; 2	SUZ; 2^{3}				1st	117.5
2025	Vantelin Team TOM'S	Toyota	SUZ; 4	SUZ; 2	MOT; 4	MOT; Ret	AUT; 1	FUJ; 1^{2}	**FUJ**; 3^{1}	SUG; 4	FUJ; 2^{3}‡	SUZ; 4	SUZ; 7	SUZ; 8	2nd	119.5
2026	Vantelin Team TOM'S	Toyota	MOT; 9‡	MOT; 14	SUZ; 3	SUZ; 5	FUJ; 15	FUJ; 3	FUJ; 4	SUG; 7	FUJ; 5	FUJ; Ret	SUZ	SUZ	7th*	43*

^{‡} Half points awarded as less than 75% of race distance was completed.
^{*} Season still in progress.

Sporting positions
Preceded by Inaugural	F4 Japanese Championship; Champion; 2015	Succeeded by Ritomo Miyata
Preceded by Mitsunori Takaboshi	Japanese Formula 3 Championship; Champion; 2018	Succeeded by Sacha Fenestraz
Preceded by Naoki Yamamoto; Tadasuke Makino	Super GT; GT500 Champion; 2021; With: Yuhi Sekiguchi	Succeeded by Bertrand Baguette; Kazuki Hiramine
Preceded by Bertrand Baguette; Kazuki Hiramine	Super GT; GT500 Champion; 2023-2025; With: Ritomo Miyata (2023) & Kenta Yamashita (2024-2025)	Succeeded by Naoki Yamamoto; Tadasuke Makino
Preceded by Ritomo Miyata	Super Formula; Champion; 2024	Succeeded by Ayumu Iwasa
