= 2015 Formula Masters China =

Seasons
- ← 2014 2016 →

The 2015 Formula Masters China season was the fifth season of the Formula Pilota China series, and the third under the Formula Masters China branding. The championship began on 18 April at Sepang in Malaysia and finished on 18 October at Shanghai in China after eighteen races held at six meetings.

== Teams and drivers ==
Team	No.	Driver	Rounds
(Hong Kong) Cebu Pacific Air by KCMG	1	(China) Jeffrey Ye	All
(Hong Kong) Cebu Pacific Air by KCMG	2	(Australia) Nicholas Rowe	All
(Hong Kong) Cebu Pacific Air by KCMG	3	(China) Zheng Shangguan	All
(Hong Kong) Cebu Pacific Air by KCMG	4	(Estonia) Martin Rump	All
(Hong Kong) Cebu Pacific Air by KCMG	8	(China) Bo Yuan	4–6
(Hong Kong) Absolute Racing	5	(United Kingdom) Sennan Fielding	3
(Hong Kong) Absolute Racing	5	(Norway) Dennis Olsen	4
(Hong Kong) Absolute Racing	5	(United States) Oliver Askew	5–6
(Hong Kong) Absolute Racing	6	(China) Sun Zheng	3
(Hong Kong) Absolute Racing	6	(Belgium) Alessio Picariello	4–6
(Philippines) Eurasia Motorsport	7	(South Korea) Kim Jeong Tae	1–4, 6
(Philippines) Eurasia Motorsport	11	(China) Hua Miao	1–2
(Philippines) Eurasia Motorsport	19	(Philippines) Takeru Muratomi	1
(Philippines) Eurasia Motorsport	24	(Australia) Aidan Read	All
(Philippines) Eurasia Motorsport	36	(Hong Kong) Sam Lok	3
(Philippines) Eurasia Motorsport	54	(Singapore) Sean Hudspeth	1–5
(Philippines) Eurasia Motorsport	94	(Hong Kong) William Lok	4–5
(Philippines) Eurasia Motorsport	99	(Philippines) Asuka Muratomi	1
(Malaysia) Meritus.GP	8	(China) Bo Yuan	1–2
(Malaysia) Meritus.GP	16	(Malaysia) Daniel Woodroof	All
(Malaysia) Meritus.GP	27	(Australia) Jake Parsons	All
(Malaysia) Meritus.GP	33	(Hong Kong) Tommy Wong	3
(Malaysia) Meritus.GP	77	(Thailand) Worawong Komarakul	1
(China) Dasheng Zheng	9	(China) Dasheng Zheng	2
(Japan) Super License Team	17	(China) Hong Shijie	2–6
(Japan) Super License Team	39	(Japan) Tomoki Takahashi	1–2, 5–6
(Japan) Super License Team	55	(Japan) Takashi Hata	All
(Japan) Super License Team	56	(Japan) Shota Kiyohara	3–4
(Malaysia) Arrows Racing	49	(South Africa) Matthew Swanepoel	All

== Race calendar and results ==
A provisional race calendar was released on 15 December 2014. An updated race calendar was released on 29 January 2015. On 29 March, it was announced that the round due to be held at Sentul in Indonesia, had been removed from the calendar.

Round		Circuit	Date	Pole position	Fastest lap	Winning driver	Winning team
1	R1	(Malaysia) Sepang International Circuit	25 April	(Estonia) Martin Rump	(Australia) Jake Parsons	(Estonia) Martin Rump	(Hong Kong) Cebu Pacific Air by KCMG
1	R2	(Malaysia) Sepang International Circuit	26 April		(Australia) Jake Parsons	(Australia) Jake Parsons	(Malaysia) Meritus.GP
1	R3	(Malaysia) Sepang International Circuit	26 April	(Philippines) Asuka Muratomi	(Thailand) Worawong Komarakul	(Australia) Jake Parsons	(Malaysia) Meritus.GP
2	R1	(China) Shanghai International Circuit	6 June	(Australia) Jake Parsons	(Estonia) Martin Rump	(Estonia) Martin Rump	(Hong Kong) Cebu Pacific Air by KCMG
2	R2	(China) Shanghai International Circuit	7 June		(Estonia) Martin Rump	(Estonia) Martin Rump	(Hong Kong) Cebu Pacific Air by KCMG
2	R3	(China) Shanghai International Circuit	7 June	(Estonia) Martin Rump	(Australia) Jake Parsons	(Australia) Jake Parsons	(Malaysia) Meritus.GP
3	R1	(Taiwan) Penbay International Circuit	4 July	(Estonia) Martin Rump	(Estonia) Martin Rump	(Estonia) Martin Rump	(Hong Kong) Cebu Pacific Air by KCMG
3	R2	(Taiwan) Penbay International Circuit	4 July		(Estonia) Martin Rump	(Estonia) Martin Rump	(Hong Kong) Cebu Pacific Air by KCMG
3	R3	(Taiwan) Penbay International Circuit	5 July	(Estonia) Martin Rump	(Estonia) Martin Rump	(Estonia) Martin Rump	(Hong Kong) Cebu Pacific Air by KCMG
4	R1	(Malaysia) Kuala Lumpur Street Circuit	8 August	(Estonia) Martin Rump	(Estonia) Martin Rump	(Estonia) Martin Rump	(Hong Kong) Cebu Pacific Air by KCMG
4	R2	(Malaysia) Kuala Lumpur Street Circuit	8 August		(Estonia) Martin Rump	(Estonia) Martin Rump	(Hong Kong) Cebu Pacific Air by KCMG
4	R3	(Malaysia) Kuala Lumpur Street Circuit	9 August	(Estonia) Martin Rump	(Japan) Shota Kiyohara	(Estonia) Martin Rump	(Hong Kong) Cebu Pacific Air by KCMG
5	R1	(China) Zhuhai International Circuit	19 September	(Estonia) Martin Rump	(Estonia) Martin Rump	(Estonia) Martin Rump	(Hong Kong) Cebu Pacific Air by KCMG
5	R2	(China) Zhuhai International Circuit	20 September		(Belgium) Alessio Picariello	(Belgium) Alessio Picariello	(Hong Kong) Absolute Racing
5	R3	(China) Zhuhai International Circuit	20 September	(Belgium) Alessio Picariello	(Estonia) Martin Rump	(Belgium) Alessio Picariello	(Hong Kong) Absolute Racing
6	R1	(China) Shanghai International Circuit	17 October	(Belgium) Alessio Picariello	(Belgium) Alessio Picariello	(Belgium) Alessio Picariello	(Hong Kong) Absolute Racing
6	R2	(China) Shanghai International Circuit	18 October		(Belgium) Alessio Picariello	(Belgium) Alessio Picariello	(Hong Kong) Absolute Racing
6	R3	(China) Shanghai International Circuit	18 October	(Belgium) Alessio Picariello	(Estonia) Martin Rump	(Belgium) Alessio Picariello	(Hong Kong) Absolute Racing

== Championship standings ==
=== Drivers' championship ===
- Points for both championships were awarded as follows:

Position	1st	2nd	3rd	4th	5th	6th	7th	8th	9th	10th	PP
Races 1 & 3	20	15	12	10	8	6	4	3	2	1	1
Race 2	12	10	8	6	4	3	2	1	0		1

Pos.	Driver	SEP (Malaysia)			SHI (China)			PEN (Taiwan)			KUA (Malaysia)			ZHU (China)			SHI (China)			Pts
1	(Estonia) Martin Rump	**1**	2	10	1	**1**	**2**	**1**	**1**	**1**	**1**	**1**	**1**	**1**	**2**	2	2	4	2	274
2	(Australia) Jake Parsons	2	**1**	1	**3**	Ret	1	2	2	4	Ret	2	3	3	Ret	Ret	9	9	3	163
3	(Australia) Nicholas Rowe	5	8	6	4	2	7	3	3	2	3	6	4	6	5	5	4	3	Ret	135
4	(Belgium) Alessio Picariello										2	3	Ret	2	1	**1**	**1**	**1**	**1**	126
5	(Australia) Aidan Read	4	3	3	5	4	5	4	Ret	5	13	14	10	4	4	6	5	5	4	115
6	(Malaysia) Daniel Woodroof	Ret	5	2	2	3	13	7	10	7	5	5	9	5	10	Ret	8	8	6	82
7	(South Africa) Matthew Swanepoel	3	7	5	Ret	13	4	6	4	8	Ret	10	7	12	6	3	Ret	10	Ret	66
8	(China) Yuan Bo	8	DNS	7	8	6	3				Ret	Ret	6	7	3	9	6	7	7	57
9	(Singapore) Sean Hudspeth	6	4	4	6	8	9	Ret	Ret	11	7	9	8	8	8	4				52
10	(United States) Oliver Askew													11	Ret	7	3	2	5	34
11	(Japan) Shota Kiyohara							Ret	8	6	4	4	5							31
12	(China) Jeffrey Ye	10	12	13	9	9	Ret	5	7	9	8	11	11	10	Ret	8	7	12	Ret	26
13	(China) Zheng Shangguan	Ret	13	15	Ret	7	10	Ret	6	10	6	8	Ret	9	9	13	10	6	9	22
14	(South Korea) Kim Jeong Tae	7	9	9	10	10	6	10	11	13	9	Ret	12				12	Ret	8	19
15	(Japan) Tomoki Takahashi	11	10	8	7	5	8							Ret	7	10	11	11	10	18
16	(Norway) Dennis Olsen										Ret	7	2							17
17	(United Kingdom) Sennan Fielding							Ret	5	3										16
18	(Philippines) Asuka Muratomi	Ret	6	**Ret**																4
19	(China) Sun Zheng							8	9	12										3
20	(Japan) Takashi Hata	Ret	14	12	12	12	DNS	9	Ret	Ret	10	13	Ret	13	Ret	14	13	13	Ret	3
21	(China) Hua Miao	9	11	11	11	11	11													2
22	(China) Hong Shijie				13	14	12	11	12	14	12	12	Ret	14	11	11	Ret	Ret	11	0
23	(Hong Kong) William Lok										11	15	Ret	15	Ret	12				0
24	(Thailand) Worawong Komarakul	12	15	14																0
25	(Hong Kong) Sam Lok							12	DNS	DNS										0
26	(Hong Kong) Tommy Wong							13	13	DNS										0
	(Philippines) Takeru Muratomi	Ret	Ret	DNS																0
	(China) Zheng Dasheng				Ret	DNS	DNS													0
Pos.	Driver	SEP (Malaysia)			SHI (China)			PEN (Taiwan)			KUA (Malaysia)			ZHU (China)			SHI (China)			Pts

Colour	Result
Gold	Winner
Silver	Second place
Bronze	Third place
Green	Points classification
Blue	Non-points classification
Blue	Non-classified finish (NC)
Purple	Retired, not classified (Ret)
Red	Did not qualify (DNQ)
Red	Did not pre-qualify (DNPQ)
Black	Disqualified (DSQ)
White	Did not start (DNS)
White	Withdrew (WD)
White	Race cancelled (C)
Blank	Did not practice (DNP)
Blank	Did not arrive (DNA)
Blank	Excluded (EX)

**Bold** – Pole
Italics – Fastest Lap
† – Retired, but classified

=== Teams' championship ===
Pos.	Team	Pts
1	(Hong Kong) Cebu Pacific Air by KCMG	348
2	(Malaysia) Meritus.GP	236
3	(Philippines) Eurasia Motorsport	143
4	(Hong Kong) Absolute Racing	109
5	(Malaysia) Arrows Racing	66
6	(Japan) Super License Team	54
	(China) Zheng Dasheng	0
