= Jake Parsons =

Australian racing driver (born 1994)

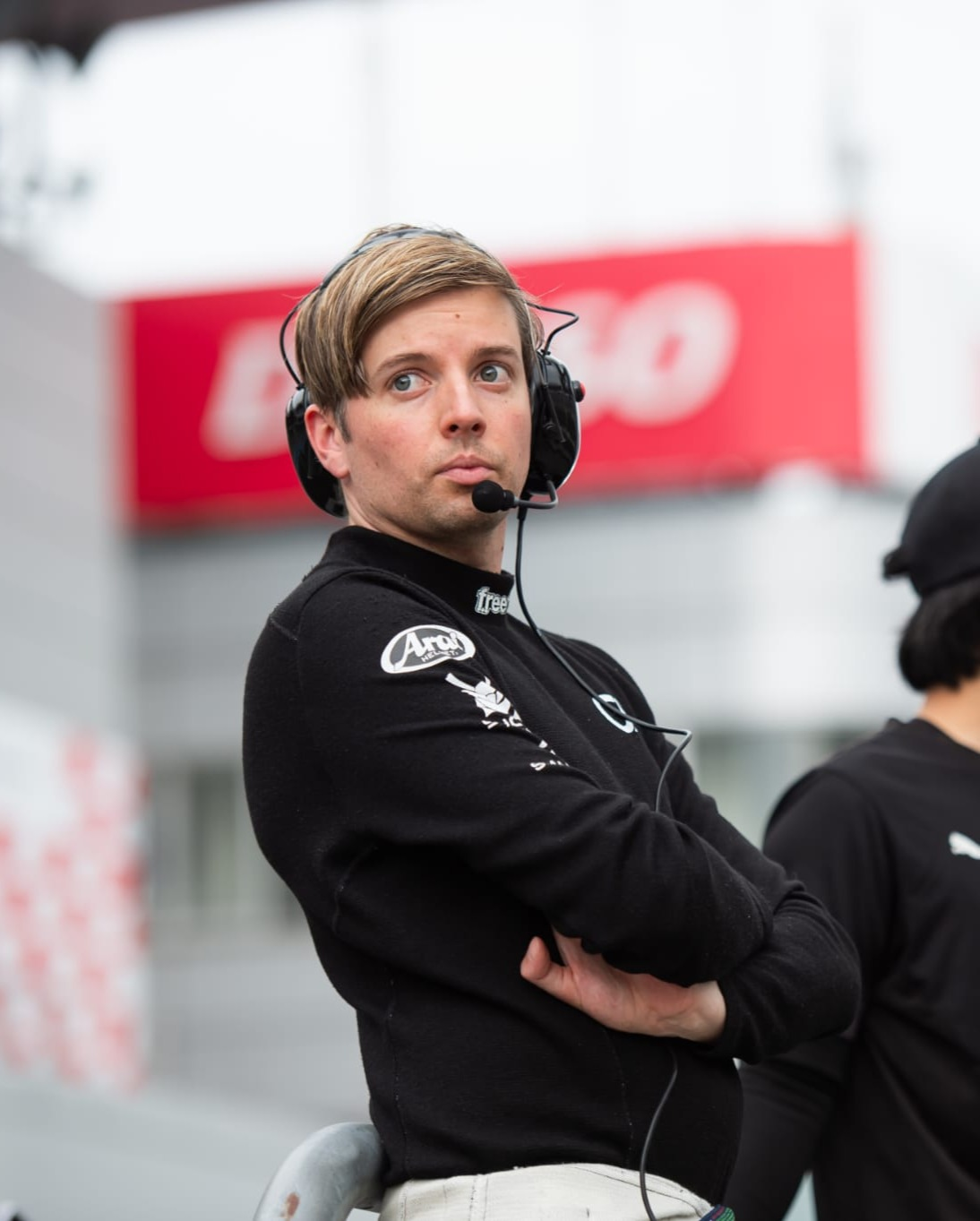
- Parsons in 2025
- Nationality: (Australia) Australian
- Born: Jacob John Parsons; 26 December 1994 (age 31) Melbourne, Victoria, Australia

Previous series
- 2021 2018 2017, 2020 2016 2014-15 2014: Super Taikyu; Japanese Formula 3 Championship; Super GT – GT300; Pro Mazda Championship; Formula Masters China; Australian Formula Ford Series

Championship titles
- 2018: Japanese Formula 3 Championship – National Class

Jacob John Parsons (born 26 December 1994) is an Australian racing driver. In 2018, he was crowned champion in the Japanese Formula 3 Championship National class. He is also the driver and managing director for AWD Racing.

== Career ==
=== Early career ===
Parsons started his early career karting in Australia. He then competed in the Australian Formula Ford Series in 2014 as well as Formula Masters China. He stayed for 2015 with Meritus where he finished Vice Champion behind Martin Rump.

Parsons moved to the States as he competed in the 2016 Pro Mazda Championship with Juncos Racing.

Parsons also competed in the Asian Le Mans Series for two seasons, competing in one race of each of the two seasons of 2017-18 and 18-19.

=== Japanese motorsport ===
Parsons moved to Japan to compete in the Super GT GT300 class with Team Taisan alongside Shinnosuke Yamada for the 2017 season.

Parsons switched to compete in the 2018 Japanese Formula 3 Championship for Noda Racing He won the National class taking victory in all races aside from one.

For 2019, Parsons competed in the Super Taikyu TCR class with Adenau alongside Shogo Mitsuyama, and Philippe Devesa.

In 2020, Parsons returned to Super GT after a two-year absence, driving for Honda factory team Drago Corse alongside owner/driver Ryō Michigami.

Parsons then competed in the Super Taikyu ST-Z class with Team 5ZIGEN in 2021, followed by a switch to D'station Racing for two seasons in ST-1, and one race in ST-X in 2022 and 2023.

In 2025, Parsons assisted in the formation of a new team with Japanese company AWD and Canadian Jesse Anthony Swinimer by the name of "AWD Racing". Both Parsons and Swinimer also competed in SRO Japan Cup in the GTC class.

== Racing record ==
=== Racing career summary ===
Season	Series	Team	Races	Wins	Poles	F/Laps	Podiums	Points	Position
2014	Formula Masters China	Meritus.GP	12	3	3	2	7	116	4th
2014	Australian Formula Ford Series	Synergy Motorsport	12	0	0	0	1	116	9th
2015	Formula Masters China	Meritus.GP	18	3	2	2	11	163	**2nd**
2016	Pro Mazda Championship	Juncos Racing	16	0	0	0	2	258	6th
2016	Lamborghini Super Trofeo Asia								
2017	Super GT - GT300	Team Taisan SARD	8	0	0	0	0	0	NC
2017–18	Asian Le Mans Series - LMP2	Eurasia Motorsport	1	1	0	0	1	16	8th
2018	Japanese Formula 3 Championship	NODA Racing	18	0	0	0	0	0	18th
2018	Japanese Formula 3 Championship - National	NODA Racing	18	18	16	18	18	214	**1st**
2018–19	Asian Le Mans Series - LMP3	Jackie Chan DC Racing X Jota Sport	1	0	0	0	0	1	15th
2019	Super Taikyu - ST-Z	Adenau	5	0	0	0	2	84.5‡	4th‡
2020	Super GT - GT300	Modulo Drago Corse	8	0	0	0	0	8	22nd
2021	Super Taikyu - ST-Z	Team 5Zigen	4	0	0	0	2	80.5‡	**3rd‡**
2022	Super Taikyu - ST-1	D'station Racing	4	2	1	0	4	151.5‡	**2nd‡**
2023	Super Taikyu - ST-1	D'station Racing	5	1	1	0	5	151.5‡	**2nd‡**
2023	Super Taikyu - ST-X	D'station Racing	1	0	0	0	0	6‡	8th‡
2025	SRO Japan Cup - GTC	AWD Racing	2	1	2	0	2	43	**3rd**
2026	SRO Japan Cup - GT3	AWD Racing	8	0	0	0	1	32	10th
2026	Super Taikyu - ST-1	D'station Racing							

=== Complete Super GT results ===
(key) (Races in bold indicate pole position) (Races in italics indicate fastest lap)

Year	Team	Car	Class	1	2	3	4	5	6	7	8	DC	Pts
2017	Team Taisan SARD	Audi R8 LMS	GT300	OKA; 21	FUJ; 21	AUT; 14	SUG; 18	FUJ; 19	SUZ; Ret	CHA; 19	MOT; 14	NC	0
2020	Modulo Drago Corse	Honda NSX GT3 Evo	GT300	FUJ; 8	FUJ; 7	SUZ; 19	MOT; 10	FUJ; 13	SUZ; 27	MOT; 14	FUJ; 17	22nd	8

=== Complete Japanese Formula 3 results ===
(key) (Races in bold indicate pole position) (Races in italics indicate fastest lap)

Year	Team	Engine	Class	1	2	3	4	5	6	7	8	9	10	11	12	13	14	15	16	17	18	19	20	21	DC	Pts
2018	NODA Racing	Volkswagen		SUZ; 1; 13	SUZ; 2; 13	SUG1; 1; 13	SUG1; 2; 14	FUJ1; 1; 12	FUJ1; 2; 11	OKA1; 1; 14	OKA1; 2; 13	OKA1; 3 C	MOT; 1; 14	MOT; 2; 14	MOT; 3; 15	OKA2; 1; 10	OKA2; 2; 11	OKA2; 3 C	SUG2; 1; 14	SUG2; 2; 15	SUG2; 3; 9	SUG2; 4 DNS	FUJ2; 1; 14	FUJ2; 2; 12	18th	0
2018	NODA Racing	Volkswagen	N	**SUZ**; **1**; 1	**SUZ**; **2**; 1	**SUG1**; **1**; 1	**SUG1**; **2**; 1	**FUJ1**; **1**; 1	**FUJ1**; **2**; 1	**OKA1**; **1**; 1	**OKA1**; **2**; 1	OKA1; 3 C	**MOT**; **1**; 1	**MOT**; **2**; 1	MOT; 3; 1	**OKA2**; **1**; 1	**OKA2**; **2**; 1	OKA2; 3 C	**SUG2**; **1**; 1	**SUG2**; **2**; 1	**SUG2**; **3**; 1	SUG2; 4 DNS	**FUJ2**; **1**; 1	**FUJ2**; **2**; 1	1st	214
