= 2015 F4 Japanese Championship =

Motor racing competition

The 2015 F4 Japanese Championship was the inaugural season of the F4 Japanese Championship. It began on 4 April in Okayama and finished on 15 November on Twin Ring Motegi after seven double header rounds.

== Teams and drivers ==
Team	No.	Driver	Rounds
(Japan) Hanashima Racing	2	(Japan) Katsuaki Kubota	1–2, 7
(Japan) Hanashima Racing	2	(Japan) Shuma Sato	3–5
(Japan) Sutekina Racing Team	3	(Japan) Takahiro Ban	1
(Japan) Sutekina Racing Team	3	(Japan) Miku Ikejima	2–3
(Japan) Sutekina Racing Team	3	(Japan) Sena Sakaguchi	4–7
(Japan) RS Fine	4	(Japan) Shunsuke Kohno	All
(Japan) RS Fine	5	(Japan) Yuya Hiraki	All
(Japan) Clear Corporation	6	(Japan) Masanori Yonekura	1, 3–4, 6
(Japan) Honda Formula Dream Project	7	(Japan) Hiroki Otsu	All
(Japan) Honda Formula Dream Project	8	(Japan) Yuta Kamimura	All
(Japan) Honda Formula Dream Project	9	(Japan) Mizuki Ishizaka	All
(Japan) Honda Formula Dream Project	10	(Japan) Katsuhide Kaneishi	All
(Japan) Rn-sports	11	(Japan) Tadasuke Makino	All
(Japan) Rn-sports	57	(Japan) Nobuhiro Yoshida	6
(Japan) Team A-ONE with SECNA	12	(Japan) Yuki Shiraishi	1–4, 6
(Hong Kong) KCMG	14	(Japan) Yuki Nemoto	All
(Hong Kong) KCMG	18	(New Zealand) James Munro	1–2
(Hong Kong) KCMG	18	(Hong Kong) Paul Ip	3
(Japan) Media Do Kageyama Racing	16	(Japan) Tsubasa Mekaru	1–5
(Japan) ARN Racing	17	(Japan) Hiroaki Nagai	5–7
(Italy) VSR Lamborghini S.C.Formula Jr	19	(Japan) Takuro Shinohara	All
(Italy) VSR Lamborghini S.C.Formula Jr	63	(Brazil) Nicolas Costa	1–4
(Italy) VSR Lamborghini S.C.Formula Jr	63	(Brazil) Gustavo Myasava	5–7
(Japan) miNami aoYama with SARD	20	(Japan) Kotoka Goibuchi	2, 4
(Japan) miNami aoYama with SARD	20	(Japan) Ayaka Imahashi	3, 5
(Japan) miNami aoYama with SARD	20	(Japan) Miki Koyama	6–7
(Japan) miNami aoYama with SARD	28	(Japan) Yoshiaki Katayama	1–2
(Japan) miNami aoYama with SARD	39	(Japan) Junpei Kato	All
(Japan) RSS	21	(Japan) Turbo Asahi	3–4, 7
(Japan) RSS	22	(Japan) Ritomo Miyata	5–7
(Japan) N-SPEED	23	(Japan) Yugo Tanabe	All
(Japan) Mars Racing Factory	24	(Japan) Hideki Nakahara	7
(Japan) Field Motorsport	25	(Japan) Tomoki Takahashi	2–4, 7
(Japan) Field Motorsport	55	(Japan) Takashi Hata	1–2, 4, 6–7
(Japan) Field Motorsport	75	(Japan) Yuya Tezuka	All
(Japan) Zap Speed Racing Team	27	(South Korea) Hwang Do-yun	1–4, 7
(Japan) Shunsuke Sato	32	(Japan) Shunsuke Sato	4
(Japan) Sfida Racing Team	34	(Japan) "Flying Rat"	2–4
(Japan) Sfida Racing Team	35	(Australia) "Motor Mouse"	2–4
(Japan) TOM'S Spirit	36	(Japan) Sho Tsuboi	All
(Japan) TOM'S Spirit	37	(Japan) Kazuto Kotaka	2–7
(Japan) Garage Chabatake	38	(Japan) Ryo Yamada	1–3
(Japan) Garage Chabatake	38	(Japan) Tsuyoshi Tajima	5, 7
(Japan) Buzz International	44	(Japan) View Yamauchi	All
(Japan) Buzz International	45	(Japan) Yosuke Yamazaki	7
(Japan) B-Max Racing Team	50	(Japan) Shinnosuke Yamada	All
(Japan) B-Max Racing Team	51	(Japan) Yuichi Mikasa	All
(Japan) Saitama Toyopet GreenBrave	52	(Japan) Taku Bamba	1–3, 5–7
(Japan) Le Beausset Motorsports	62	(Japan) Noa Satomi	All
(Japan) Skill Speed	66	(Japan) Riku Hashimoto	All
(Japan) leprix sport	70	(Japan) Tsubasa Amano	2–7
(Japan) NRS	80	(Japan) Yudai Jinkawa	1
(Japan) NRS	80	(Japan) Satoshi Kosugi	2
(Japan) NRS	81	(Japan) Musashi Nakanishi	2–3
(Japan) NRS	81	(Japan) Yuichi Sasaki	7
(Japan) Succeed Sports	88	(Japan) Shintaro Kawabata	All
(Japan) Succeed Sports	89	(Japan) Takahiro Ban	3–5
(Japan) Succeed Sports	89	(Japan) Ryota Kiyohara	6–7

== Race calendar and results ==
The calendar was published on 19 January 2015. All rounds were held in Japan and were part of the Super GT events.

Round		Circuit	Date	Pole position	Fastest lap	Winning driver	Winning team
1	R1	Okayama International Circuit, Mimasaka	4 April	(Japan) Sho Tsuboi	(Japan) Tadasuke Makino	(Japan) Tadasuke Makino	(Japan) Rn-sports
1	R2	Okayama International Circuit, Mimasaka	5 April	(Japan) Tsubasa Mekaru	(Japan) Tadasuke Makino	(Japan) Tadasuke Makino	(Japan) Rn-sports
2	R1	Fuji Speedway, Oyama	2 May	(Japan) Tadasuke Makino	(Japan) Sho Tsuboi	(Japan) Sho Tsuboi	(Japan) TOM'S Spirit
2	R2	Fuji Speedway, Oyama	3 May	(Japan) Tadasuke Makino	(Japan) Sho Tsuboi	(Japan) Tadasuke Makino	(Japan) Rn-sports
3	R1	Fuji Speedway, Oyama	8 August	(Japan) Katsuhide Kaneishi	(Japan) Yuya Hiraki	(Japan) Tadasuke Makino	(Japan) Rn-sports
3	R2	Fuji Speedway, Oyama	9 August	(Japan) Katsuhide Kaneishi	(Japan) Yuya Hiraki	(Japan) Sho Tsuboi	(Japan) TOM'S Spirit
4	R1	Suzuka Circuit, Suzuka	29 August	(Japan) Sho Tsuboi	(Japan) Yuya Hiraki	(Japan) Sho Tsuboi	(Japan) TOM'S Spirit
4	R2	Suzuka Circuit, Suzuka	30 August	(Japan) Tadasuke Makino	(Japan) Tadasuke Makino	(Japan) Sho Tsuboi	(Japan) TOM'S Spirit
5	R1	Sportsland SUGO, Murata	19 September	(Japan) Sho Tsuboi	(Japan) Shunsuke Kohno	(Japan) Sho Tsuboi	(Japan) TOM'S Spirit
5	R2	Sportsland SUGO, Murata	20 September	(Japan) Sho Tsuboi	(Japan) Sena Sakaguchi	(Japan) Sho Tsuboi	(Japan) TOM'S Spirit
6	R1	Autopolis, Hita	31 October	(Japan) Hiroki Otsu	(Japan) Sho Tsuboi	(Japan) Sho Tsuboi	(Japan) TOM'S Spirit
6	R2	Autopolis, Hita	1 November	(Japan) Yuya Hiraki	(Japan) Kazuto Kotaka	(Japan) Shinnosuke Yamada	(Japan) B-Max Racing Team
7	R1	Twin Ring Motegi, Motegi	14 November	(Japan) Yuki Nemoto	(Japan) Yuta Kamimura	(Japan) Tadasuke Makino	(Japan) Rn-sports
7	R2	Twin Ring Motegi, Motegi	15 November	(Japan) Tadasuke Makino	(Japan) Sho Tsuboi	(Japan) Tadasuke Makino	(Japan) Rn-sports

== Championship standings ==
=== Drivers' Championships ===
- Only the best eleven results counted towards the championship. Points were awarded as follows:

Position	**1st**	**2nd**	**3rd**	**4th**	**5th**	**6th**	**7th**	**8th**	**9th**	**10th**
Points	20	15	12	10	8	6	4	3	2	1

==== Overall ====
Pos	Driver	OKA		FUJ1		FUJ2		SUZ		SUG		AUT		MOT		Points
1	(Japan) Sho Tsuboi	**2**	2	1	9	4	1	**1**	1	**1**	**1**	1	17	5	2	195
2	(Japan) Tadasuke Makino	1	1	**2**	**1**	1	26	2	**2**	2	3	9	5	1	**1**	192
3	(Japan) Hiroki Otsu	9	3	4	11	2	4	4	17	5	7	**2**	2	3	24	108
4	(Japan) Shinnosuke Yamada	Ret	Ret	3	3	7	6	7	7	10	Ret	3	1	6	8	84
5	(Japan) Yuya Hiraki	3	7	6	Ret	3	2	3	3	12	13	4	**20**	Ret	13	83
6	(Japan) Kazuto Kotaka			10	13	6	5	6	4	6	7	8	6	16	11	50
7	(Japan) Yuki Nemoto	Ret	10	8	7	12	Ret	10	5	15	14	14	8	**2**	3	47
8	(Japan) Shunsuke Kohno	10	20	17	21	17	18	9	9	3	2	10	10	9	6	42
9	(Japan) Mizuki Ishizaka	DNS	16	13	5	5	Ret	5	14	20	16	6	4	11	9	42
10	(Japan) Sena Sakaguchi							30†	6	7	8	5	7	3	7	41
11	(Japan) Takuro Shinohara	17	18	Ret	4	18	8	18	8	9	4	7	9	10	22	35
12	(Japan) Yuta Kamimura	Ret	5	11	15	Ret	12	8	10	8	6	16	15	7	4	35
13	(Japan) Shintaro Kawabata	15	Ret	5	10	11	13	28	11	14	11	15	11	4	5	27
14	(Japan) Yuichi Mikasa	5	Ret	Ret	2	Ret	9	22	18	13	12	21	16	Ret	17	25
15	(Japan) Ritomo Miyata									4	9	Ret	3	14	27	24
16	(Japan) Katsuhide Kaneishi	19	9	21	28	**Ret**	**3**	16	19	21	22	27	13	15	12	14
17	(Japan) Tsubasa Mekaru	6	**Ret**	7	32†	8	25	12	13	16	15					13
18	(Brazil) Nicolas Costa	4	15	12	14	DNS	16	13	24							10
19	(New Zealand) James Munro	Ret	4	16	Ret											10
20	(Japan) Yuki Shiraishi	7	6	18	16	16	24	15	15			12	Ret			10
21	(Japan) Musashi Nakanishi			33†	6	21	23									6
22	(Japan) Turbo Asahi					10	7	20	30					23	23	5
23	(Japan) Noa Satomi	20	8	Ret	20	19	31	17	16	17	Ret	11	12	12	Ret	3
24	(Japan) Riku Hashimoto	11	17	19	8	24	Ret	19	20	27	21	24	23	15	Ret	3
25	(Japan) Ryo Yamada	8	12	15	Ret	20	19									3
26	(Japan) Taku Bamba	WD	WD	9	12	14	15			18	17	13	21	Ret	10	3
27	(Japan) Tsubasa Amano			22	19	9	11	Ret	12	Ret	19	18	14	17	14	2
28	(Japan) Shuma Sato					13	14	31†	22	11	10					1
29	(Japan) Junpei Kato	13	19	14	24	15	10	14	DNS	26	23	19	27	Ret	25	1
30	(Japan) Takahiro Ban	18	11			26	20	32†	23	23	26					0
31	(Japan) Tomoki Takahashi			31	18	Ret	21	11	26					WD	WD	0
32	(Japan) Masanori Yonekura	12	23†			WD	WD	24	25			26	24			0
33	(Japan) View Yamauchi	WD	WD	20	25	22	17	Ret	31	24	24	25	22	13	21	0
34	(Japan) Yoshiaki Katayama	21	13	DNS	Ret											0
35	(Japan) Yuya Tezuka	22	14	23	17	23	22	21	27	22	20	17	18	19	Ret	0
36	(Japan) Katsuaki Kubota	14	22	26	31									Ret	Ret	0
37	(South Korea) Hwang Do-yun	WD	WD	25	Ret	Ret	33	23	21					25	16	0
38	(Japan) Yugo Tanabe	16	24	32	29	Ret	32	29	33	30	29	30	28	28	32	0
39	(Brazil) Gustavo Myasava									19	38	23	Ret	Ret	18	0
40	(Japan) Yosuke Yamazaki													18	Ret	0
41	(Japan) Hiroaki Nagai									25	25	29	29†	21	19	0
42	(Japan) Nobuhiro Yoshida											22	19			0
43	(Japan) Ryota Kiyohara											20	Ret	Ret	20	0
44	(Japan) Takashi Hata	Ret	21	28	Ret			25	29			Ret	25	20	30	0
45	(Japan) Satoshi Kosugi			24	22											0
46	(Japan) Tsuyoshi Tajima									29	28			22	31	0
47	(Japan) Kotoka Goibuchi			27	23			27	DNS							0
48	(Japan) Yuichi Sasaki													24	29	0
49	(Japan) Ayaka Imahashi					25	28									0
50	(Japan) Miki Koyama											28	26	26	26	0
51	(Australia) "Motor Mouse"			29	26	27	27	WD	WD							0
52	(Japan) "Flying Rat"			30	27	28	30	26	32							0
53	(Japan) Hideki Nakahara													27	28	0
54	(Japan) Shunsuke Sato							Ret	28							0
55	(Japan) Miku Ikejima			Ret	30	Ret	29									0
	(Japan) Yudai Jinkawa	WD	WD													0
	(Hong Kong) Paul Ip					WD	WD									0
Pos	Driver	OKA		FUJ1		FUJ2		SUZ		SUG		AUT		MOT		Points

Colour	Result
Gold	Winner
Silver	Second place
Bronze	Third place
Green	Points classification
Blue	Non-points classification
Blue	Non-classified finish (NC)
Purple	Retired, not classified (Ret)
Red	Did not qualify (DNQ)
Red	Did not pre-qualify (DNPQ)
Black	Disqualified (DSQ)
White	Did not start (DNS)
White	Withdrew (WD)
White	Race cancelled (C)
Blank	Did not practice (DNP)
Blank	Did not arrive (DNA)
Blank	Excluded (EX)

**Bold** – Pole
Italics – Fastest Lap
† — Did not finish, but classified

=== Teams' standings ===
Pos	Team	Pts.
1	(Japan) TOM'S Spirit	225
2	(Japan) Rn-sports	216
3	(Japan) Honda Formula Dream Project	144
4	(Japan) RS Fine	133
5	(Japan) B-Max Racing Team	109
6	(Hong Kong) KCMG	70
7	(Italy) VSR Lamborghini S.C.Formula Jr	59
8	(Japan) Sutekina Racing Team	55
9	(Japan) Succeed Sports	41
10	(Japan) RSS	39
11	(Japan) Media Do Kageyama Racing	23
12	(Japan) Eagle Sport	20
13	(Japan) Le Beausset Motorsports	17
14	(Japan) Skill Speed	17
15	(Japan) miNami aoYama with SARD	14
16	(Japan) N-Speed	14
17	(Japan) Field Motorsport	14
18	(Japan) Leprix Sport	14
19	(Japan) Garage Chabatake	13
20	(Japan) Hanamashima Racing	13
21	(Japan) Saitama Toyopet GreenBrave	13
22	(Japan) NRS	10
23	(Japan) Buzz International	10
24	(Japan) Zap Speed Racing Team	8
25	(Japan) Sfida Racing Team	6
26	(Japan) Clear Corporation	6
27	(Japan) ARN Racing	6
