= James Munro (racing driver) =

New Zealand racing driver (born 1997)

- Nationality: (New Zealand) New Zealander
- Born: 20 January 1997 (age 29) Christchurch
- Relatives: Mark Munro (father)

Previous series
- 2014–2016 2014 2013: Toyota Racing Series; Formula Pilota China; New Zealand Formula Ford

Championship titles
- 2014 2013: Formula Pilota China; New Zealand Formula Ford

James Munro (born 20 January 1997 in Christchurch, New Zealand) is a New Zealand former racing driver. Munro won championships in junior formulae such as Formula Ford and Formula Pilota China. James is the son of Mark Munro, a former Toyota Racing Series racing driver.

== Racing career ==
After his New Zealand kart career, Munro started racing cars in 2013. Racing a Mygale Munro won the New Zealand Formula Ford Championship winning ten out of fifteen races. He graduated into the fastest racing series in New Zealand, the Toyota Racing Series. Munro won one race at Timaru. The young driver finished seventh in the series championship. He was the second best scoring Kiwi, behind Damon Leitch who placed third. In the regular season, Munro competed in the Formula Pilota China series. The series, using Tatuus FA010 Formula Abarth chassis with Volkswagen engines, ran on Asian circuits in China, South-Korea and Malaysia. Munro won the championship with Cebu Pacific Air by KCMG, a team headed by former racing driver John O'Hara. The Kiwi driver started the season with six straight race wins at Zhuhai and Shanghai. Munro won two more races at both circuits later in the season claiming the championship.

For 2015, Munro started the season again in the Toyota Racing Series. The series introduced a new car, the Tatuus FT50, with a new chassis and updated aerodynamics. Munro was less successful with only one podium finish, a second place at Teretonga Park. In the strong international field, Munro placed ninth in the championship standings, again the second Kiwi behind Damon Leitch. During the regular summer season Munro started in the inaugural F4 Japanese Championship with KCMG. Initially announced competing the full season, Munro left the series after two rounds. Munro also competed in the Sepang 12 Hours along with Martin Rump, Afiq Yazid and Yuan Bo in a Lamborghini Huracán Super Trofeo. The team finished eleventh overall, winning the Pro-Am class. At the end of the season, Munro rejoined KCMG to race the season opener of the 2015–16 Asian Le Mans Series. At Fuji Speedway Munro was joined by Christian Ried and team principal Paul Ip. in the GT Am class finishing eighth overall, fifth in class.

Munro's third season in the Toyota Racing Series was the most successful, as he scored three podium finishes and finished seventh in the season standings. The New Zealander signed with Team Pelfrey to compete in the American USF2000 series. During pre-season testing at Barber Motorsports Park, he finished second in the fifth test session. After two unsuccessful events at St. Petersburg and Barber Motorsports Park, Munro left the series.

== Personal ==
Munro is a graduate from Medbury primary school. Munro has studied at Christ's College, Christchurch.

== Racing record ==
=== Career Summary ===
Season	Series	Team	Races	Wins	Poles	F/Laps	Podiums	Points	Position
2012-13	New Zealand Formula Ford Championship	N/A	15	10	4	6	12	992	1st
2014	Toyota Racing Series	Neale Motorsport	15	1	1	0	2	587	7th
2014	Formula Masters China	Cebu Pacific Air by KCMG	18	8	5	6	11	215	1st
2015	Toyota Racing Series	Giles Motorsport	15	0	0	0	1	522	9th
2015	F4 Japanese Championship	KCMG	4	0	0	0	0	10	19th
2015-16	Asian Le Mans Series - GT	KCMG	1	1	1	1	1	26	3rd
2016	Toyota Racing Series	Giles Motorsport	15	0	0	1	3	621	7th
2016	U.S. F2000 National Championship	Team Pelfrey	4	0	0	0	0	20	23rd

=== USF2000 National Championship ===
Year	Team	1	2	3	4	5	6	7	8	9	10	11	12	13	14	15	16	Rank	Points
2016	Team Pelfrey	STP; 18	STP; 21	BAR; 11	BAR; 23	IMS	IMS	LOR	ROA	ROA	TOR	TOR	MOH	MOH	MOH	LAG	LAG	23rd	20
