= 2014 Formula Masters China =

Seasons
- ← 2013 2015 →

The 2014 Formula Masters China season was the fourth season of the Formula Pilota China series, and the second under the Formula Masters China branding. The championship commenced on 10 May at Zhuhai in China and finished on 21 October at Shanghai in China after eighteen races held at six meetings.

Driving for Cebu Pacific Air by KCMG, James Munro of New Zealand finished the season as the drivers' champion, finishing 28 points clear of his closest rival, Hong Kong's Matthew Solomon, driving for Eurasia Motorsport. Munro started the season strongly, taking six successive wins at the first Zhuhai meeting and the first Shanghai meeting, as well as the opening race at Inje Speedium. Solomon hit back with a streak of his own, with four wins at Inje and Sepang; Munro finished behind him in three of the races, and ultimately went on to win eight races to Solomon's five at the end of the season. Dan Wells of Great Britain – and team-mate to Munro – finished third in the championship, ten points in arrears of Solomon, taking a total of twelve podiums during the season, but it took him until the final four races to take his two wins for the seasons; these wins came at the second Zhuhai and Shanghai meetings.

The only other driver to take a victory during the season was Meritus.GP driver Jake Parsons, who took three victories en route to fourth place in the championship despite only competing in the second half of the season. He took seven podium finishes in his ten starts in the 2014 season. In the teams' championship, Cebu Pacific Air by KCMG were comfortable winners of the title, due to the results of Munro, Wells and Matthew Swanepoel.

== Teams and drivers ==
| Team | No. | Driver | Rounds |
|---|---|---|---|
| (China) Zen-Motorsport | 6 | (China) Bao Jin Long | 1–4, 6 |
| (China) Zen-Motorsport | 7 | (Hong Kong) Ronald Wu | All |
| (China) Zen-Motorsport | 11 | (China) Hua Miao | 1–3 |
| (China) Zen-Motorsport | 29 | (China) Yin Hai Tao | All |
| (Indonesia) Humpuss Junior Racing Team | 8 | (Indonesia) Darma Mangkuluhur Hutomo | All |
| (Indonesia) Humpuss Junior Racing Team | 36 | (Indonesia) Yasuo Senna Iriawan | All |
| (Japan) Super License Team | 9 | (Germany) Philip Hamprecht | 4, 6 |
| (Japan) Super License Team | 15 | (Japan) Yuya Motojima | 1, 6 |
| (Japan) Super License Team | 39 | (Japan) Tomoki Takahashi | 5 |
| (Japan) Super License Team | 55 | (Japan) Takashi Hata | 4–5 |
| (Japan) Super License Team | 75 | (China) Zou Chen Yu | 2 |
| (India) Meco Motorsports | 10 | (India) Akhil Rabindra | 1–3 |
| (Philippines) Eurasia Motorsport | 11 | (China) Hua Miao | 4–6 |
| (Philippines) Eurasia Motorsport | 12 | (Australia) Aidan Read | 6 |
| (Philippines) Eurasia Motorsport | 17 | (China) Pu Jun Jin | All |
| (Philippines) Eurasia Motorsport | 18 | (China) Yuan Bo | All |
| (Philippines) Eurasia Motorsport | 19 | (Hong Kong) Matthew Solomon | All |
| (Philippines) Eurasia Motorsport | 20 | (Singapore) Sean Hudspeth | 1–2, 5 |
| (Philippines) Eurasia Motorsport | 24 | (Hong Kong) Dominic Tjia | 4 |
| (Hong Kong) Cebu Pacific Air by KCMG | 16 | (United Kingdom) Dan Wells | All |
| (Hong Kong) Cebu Pacific Air by KCMG | 30 | (Japan) Ryuji Kumita | 6 |
| (Hong Kong) Cebu Pacific Air by KCMG | 40 | (New Zealand) James Munro | All |
| (Hong Kong) Cebu Pacific Air by KCMG | 49 | (South Africa) Matthew Swanepoel | 1–3 |
| (Malaysia) Meritus.GP | 21 | (South Africa) Mandla Mdakane | 3–4 |
| (Malaysia) Meritus.GP | 68 | (South Africa) Mandla Mdakane | 1–2 |
| (Malaysia) Meritus.GP | 27 | (Australia) Jake Parsons | 4–6 |
| (Malaysia) Meritus.GP | 33 | (Malaysia) Daniel Woodroof | 4–5 |
| (Malaysia) Meritus.GP | 38 | (South Africa) Aston Hare | 1–2 |
| (Malaysia) Meritus.GP | 88 | (Indonesia) Andersen Martono | All |

== Race calendar and results ==
A provisional race calendar was released on 25 October 2013. An updated race calendar was released on 29 January 2014, which dropped the round at Penbay and rescheduled the Sepang round to August as a support round to GT Asia.

| Round | | Circuit | Date | Pole position | Fastest lap | Winning driver | Winning team |
|---|---|---|---|---|---|---|---|
| 1 | R1 | (China) Zhuhai International Circuit | 10 May | (South Africa) Matthew Swanepoel | (New Zealand) James Munro | (New Zealand) James Munro | (Hong Kong) Cebu Pacific Air by KCMG |
| 1 | R2 | (China) Zhuhai International Circuit | 10 May | | (New Zealand) James Munro | (New Zealand) James Munro | (Hong Kong) Cebu Pacific Air by KCMG |
| 1 | R3 | (China) Zhuhai International Circuit | 11 May | Race postponed | | | |
| 2 | R1 | (China) Shanghai International Circuit | 24 May | (New Zealand) James Munro | (New Zealand) James Munro | (New Zealand) James Munro | (Hong Kong) Cebu Pacific Air by KCMG |
| 2 | R2 | (China) Shanghai International Circuit | 24 May | | (South Africa) Aston Hare | (New Zealand) James Munro | (Hong Kong) Cebu Pacific Air by KCMG |
| 2 | R3 | (China) Shanghai International Circuit | 25 May | (New Zealand) James Munro | (Hong Kong) Matthew Solomon | (New Zealand) James Munro | (Hong Kong) Cebu Pacific Air by KCMG |
| 3 | R1 | (South Korea) Inje Speedium | 19 July | (Hong Kong) Matthew Solomon | (New Zealand) James Munro | (New Zealand) James Munro | (Hong Kong) Cebu Pacific Air by KCMG |
| 3 | R2 | (South Korea) Inje Speedium | 19 July | | (New Zealand) James Munro | (Hong Kong) Matthew Solomon | (Philippines) Eurasia Motorsport |
| 3 | R3 | (South Korea) Inje Speedium | 20 July | (New Zealand) James Munro | (United Kingdom) Dan Wells | (Hong Kong) Matthew Solomon | (Philippines) Eurasia Motorsport |
| 3 | R4 | (South Korea) Inje Speedium | 20 July | Race postponed | | | |
| 4 | R1 | (Malaysia) Sepang International Circuit | 16 August | (Australia) Jake Parsons | (Hong Kong) Matthew Solomon | (Hong Kong) Matthew Solomon | (Philippines) Eurasia Motorsport |
| 4 | R2 | (Malaysia) Sepang International Circuit | 16 August | | (Hong Kong) Matthew Solomon | (Hong Kong) Matthew Solomon | (Philippines) Eurasia Motorsport |
| 4 | R3 | (Malaysia) Sepang International Circuit | 17 August | (Hong Kong) Matthew Solomon | (Australia) Jake Parsons | (Australia) Jake Parsons | (Malaysia) Meritus.GP |
| 5 | R1 | (China) Zhuhai International Circuit | 19 September | (Australia) Jake Parsons | (China) Yin Hai Tao | (New Zealand) James Munro | (Hong Kong) Cebu Pacific Air by KCMG |
| 5 | R2 | (China) Zhuhai International Circuit | 20 September | | (Hong Kong) Matthew Solomon | (Australia) Jake Parsons | (Malaysia) Meritus.GP |
| 5 | R3 | (China) Zhuhai International Circuit | 20 September | (China) Yuan Bo | (Hong Kong) Matthew Solomon | (Hong Kong) Matthew Solomon | (Philippines) Eurasia Motorsport |
| 5 | R4 | (China) Zhuhai International Circuit | 21 September | (New Zealand) James Munro (Note: At the May Zhuhai meeting, Matthew Swanepoel qualified on pole position. As Swanepoel was not entered for the rescheduled race, all drivers that originally qualified behind him, moved up the order.) | (China) Yuan Bo | (United Kingdom) Dan Wells | (Hong Kong) Cebu Pacific Air by KCMG |
| 6 | R1 | (China) Shanghai International Circuit | 18 October | (New Zealand) James Munro | (New Zealand) James Munro | (New Zealand) James Munro | (Hong Kong) Cebu Pacific Air by KCMG |
| 6 | R2 | (China) Shanghai International Circuit | 18 October | | (Australia) Jake Parsons | (Australia) Jake Parsons | (Malaysia) Meritus.GP |
| 6 | R3 | (China) Shanghai International Circuit | 19 October | (Australia) Jake Parsons | (Hong Kong) Matthew Solomon | (United Kingdom) Dan Wells | (Hong Kong) Cebu Pacific Air by KCMG |

== Championship standings ==
=== Drivers' championship ===
- Points for both championships were awarded as follows:

| Position | 1st | 2nd | 3rd | 4th | 5th | 6th | 7th | 8th | 9th | 10th | PP |
|---|---|---|---|---|---|---|---|---|---|---|---|
| Races 1 & 3 | 20 | 15 | 12 | 10 | 8 | 6 | 4 | 3 | 2 | 1 | 1 |
| Race 2 | 12 | 10 | 8 | 6 | 4 | 3 | 2 | 1 | 0 | 0 | 1 |

| Pos. | Driver | ZHU (China) | | | SHI (China) | | | INJ (South Korea) | | | | SEP (Malaysia) | | | ZHU (China) | | | | SHI (China) | | | Pts |
|---|---|---|---|---|---|---|---|---|---|---|---|---|---|---|---|---|---|---|---|---|---|---|
| 1 | (New Zealand) James Munro | 1 | **1** | C | **1** | **1** | **1** | 1 | **2** | **Ret** | C | 2 | 2 | 4 | 1 | Ret | 13 | **7** | **1** | **5** | 4 | 215 |
| 2 | (Hong Kong) Matthew Solomon | 7 | 3 | C | 3 | 3 | 2 | **3** | 1 | 1 | C | 1 | **1** | **2** | Ret | Ret | 1 | 3 | 14 | 4 | 5 | 187 |
| 3 | (United Kingdom) Dan Wells | 3 | 5 | C | 2 | 2 | 4 | 2 | 3 | 8 | C | 3 | Ret | 3 | Ret | 5 | 3 | 1 | 3 | 3 | 1 | 177 |
| 4 | (Australia) Jake Parsons | | | | | | | | | | | **4** | 3 | 1 | **11** | 1 | 2 | 6 | 2 | 1 | **2** | 116 |
| 5 | (Hong Kong) Ronald Wu | 6 | Ret | C | Ret | 14 | 13 | 7 | 4 | 5 | C | 10 | 10 | 9 | 2 | 3 | 5 | 11 | 8 | 7 | 7 | 67 |
| 6 | (Indonesia) Andersen Martono | 11 | Ret | C | 16 | 8 | 8 | 9 | 6 | 2 | C | Ret | Ret | 10 | 4 | 7 | 7 | 4 | 5 | Ret | 8 | 62 |
| 7 | (Indonesia) Darma Mangkuluhur Hutomo | 4 | DNS | C | 14 | 13 | 7 | 5 | 5 | 3 | C | 5 | 4 | 11 | Ret | Ret | Ret | 8 | 7 | 6 | 11 | 62 |
| 8 | (China) Yuan Bo | 5 | 4 | C | 11 | 12 | 12 | Ret | 7 | 4 | C | 6 | 9 | 13 | 12 | 8 | **8** | 2 | 10 | 13 | Ret | 53 |
| 9 | (China) Yin Hai Tao | Ret | 9 | C | 5 | 5 | 14 | 11 | Ret | 6 | C | Ret | Ret | 7 | 3 | **2** | 12 | 10 | 6 | Ret | 14† | 52 |
| 10 | (Indonesia) Yasuo Senna Iriawan | 10 | 6 | C | 7 | 7 | 9 | 6 | 8 | 7 | C | Ret | 5 | Ret | 7 | 6 | 14 | 5 | 9 | Ret | 9 | 46 |
| 11 | (Germany) Philip Hamprecht | | | | | | | | | | | 9 | 6 | 5 | | | | | 4 | 2 | 6 | 39 |
| 12 | (Japan) Yuya Motojima | 2 | 2 | C | | | | | | | | | | | | | | | Ret | 9 | 3 | 37 |
| 13 | (South Africa) Aston Hare | Ret | 7 | C | 4 | 4 | 3 | | | | | | | | | | | | | | | 30 |
| 14 | (China) Pu Jun Jin | NC | Ret | C | 6 | 10 | 5 | 8 | 13† | NC | C | Ret | Ret | 8 | 9 | 9 | 6 | 12 | 11 | 8 | 12 | 29 |
| 15 | (Singapore) Sean Hudspeth | Ret | DNS | C | 8 | 11 | 11 | | | | | | | | 5 | 11 | 4 | 9 | | | | 23 |
| 16 | (Japan) Tomoki Takahashi | | | | | | | | | | | | | | 6 | 4 | 9 | 13 | | | | 14 |
| 17 | (India) Akhil Rabindra | 8 | 8 | C | 15 | 16 | 16 | 4 | Ret | Ret | C | | | | | | | | | | | 14 |
| 18 | (China) Bao Jin Long | 9 | Ret | C | 9 | 15 | 17 | 13† | 10 | 9 | C | Ret | 8 | 6 | | | | | Ret | 12 | 10 | 14 |
| 19 | (South Africa) Matthew Swanepoel | **12** | Ret | C | 10 | 6 | 6 | Ret | 9 | Ret | C | | | | | | | | | | | 12 |
| 20 | (South Africa) Mandla Mdakane | Ret | 10 | C | NC | 9 | 10 | 10 | 11 | 10 | C | 7 | 7 | 14 | | | | | | | | 9 |
| 21 | (China) Hua Miao | Ret | Ret | C | 13 | 17 | 15 | 12 | 12 | 11 | C | 11 | 11 | 15 | 8 | 13 | 10 | 14 | 13 | 11 | 13 | 4 |
| 22 | (Malaysia) Daniel Woodroof | | | | | | | | | | | 8 | Ret | Ret | Ret | 10 | 11 | 16 | | | | 3 |
| 23 | (Japan) Takashi Hata | | | | | | | | | | | Ret | 13 | 12 | 10 | 12 | 15 | 15 | | | | 1 |
| 24 | (Australia) Aidan Read | | | | | | | | | | | | | | | | | | 12 | 10 | Ret | 0 |
| 25 | (Hong Kong) Dominic Tjia | | | | | | | | | | | 12 | 12 | 16 | | | | | | | | 0 |
| | (Japan) Ryuji Kumita | | | | | | | | | | | | | | | | | | Ret | DNS | DNS | 0 |
Guest drivers ineligible for points
| | (China) Zou Chen Yu | | | | 12 | Ret | 18 | | | | | | | | | | | | | | | 0 |
| Pos. | Driver | ZHU (China) | | | SHI (China) | | | INJ (South Korea) | | | | SEP (Malaysia) | | | ZHU (China) | | | | SHI (China) | | | Pts |

| Colour | Result |
|---|---|
| Gold | Winner |
| Silver | Second place |
| Bronze | Third place |
| Green | Points classification |
| Blue | Non-points classification |
| Blue | Non-classified finish (NC) |
| Purple | Retired, not classified (Ret) |
| Red | Did not qualify (DNQ) |
| Red | Did not pre-qualify (DNPQ) |
| Black | Disqualified (DSQ) |
| White | Did not start (DNS) |
| White | Withdrew (WD) |
| White | Race cancelled (C) |
| Blank | Did not practice (DNP) |
| Blank | Did not arrive (DNA) |
| Blank | Excluded (EX) |

**Bold** – Pole
Italics – Fastest Lap

† – Drivers did not finish the race, but were classified as they completed over 75% of the race distance.

=== Teams' championship ===
| Pos. | Team | Pts |
|---|---|---|
| 1 | (Hong Kong) Cebu Pacific Air by KCMG | 384 |
| 2 | (Philippines) Eurasia Motorsport | 274 |
| 3 | (Malaysia) Meritus.GP | 215 |
| 4 | (China) Zen–Motorsport | 124 |
| 5 | (Indonesia) Humpuss Junior Racing Team | 108 |
| 6 | (Japan) Super License Team | 91 |
| 7 | (India) Meco Motorsports | 14 |
