= Shunsuke Kohno =

Japanese racing driver

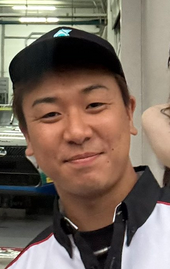
- Kohno at the 2025 Super GT Malaysia Festival
- Nationality: (Japan) Japanese
- Born: 12 September 1995 (age 31) Tokyo, Japan

Super GT - GT300 career
- Debut season: 2020
- Current team: LM corsa
- Car number: 60
- Starts: 32
- Wins: 2
- Podiums: 2
- Poles: 0
- Fastest laps: 2
- Best finish: 3rd in 2021

Previous series
- 2020-21 2018-19 2016 2015-17: Super Formula Lights; Japanese Formula 3 Championship; Asian Le Mans Series - GT; F4 Japanese Championship

Shunsuke Kohno (河野駿佑, Kōno Shunsuke; born 12 September 1995) is a Japanese racing driver who currently competes in Super GT for LM Corsa alongside Hiroki Yoshimoto.

== Career ==
=== Japanese Formula 4 ===
Kohno started his racing career in Japanese Formula 4 Championship from 2015 the inaugural season of the series. He raced in the series until 2017, and claimed three podiums, and finished on eighth, tenth, and seventh place from 2015 to 2017 respectively.

=== Japanese Formula 3 & Super Formula Lights ===
Kohno stepped up to Japanese Formula 3 Championship in 2018 with RS Fine. For two seasons, he managed to get one podium and reached eighth & tenth respectively from 2018 to 2019. He continued to race in the rebranded series Super Formula Lights with the same team from 2020 to 2021. He gained four podiums with three in 2021, he claimed fifth & sixth in the points respectively.

=== Super GT ===
Kohno competed in Super GT in 2020, where he partnered up with Hiroki Yoshimoto at LM corsa. For 2021, he stayed with the same team, and same partner. That season was the highest place for all the LM Corsa team, and Kohno himself as both claimed two wins, and placed third in the standings. Kohno partnered with LM Corsa and Yoshimoto again until 2023.

== Racing record ==
=== Career summary ===
Season	Series	Team	Races	Wins	Poles	FLaps	Podiums	Points	Position
2015	F4 Japanese Championship	RS Fine	14	0	0	1	2	42	8th
2015-16	Asian Le Mans Series - GT	Team AAI	1	0	0	0	1	2	25th
2016	F4 Japanese Championship	Field Motorsport	13	0	0	0	1	64	10th
2017	F4 Japanese Championship	HubAuto Racing	14	0	0	0	0	87	7th
2018	Japanese Formula 3 Championship	RS Fine	19	0	0	0	1	13	8th
2019	Japanese Formula 3 Championship	RS Fine	20	0	0	0	0	10	10th
2019	Super Taikyū - ST-4	T's Concept	1	0	0	0	0	46.5‡	8th‡
2020	Super GT - GT300	LM corsa	8	0	0	0	0	0	27th
2020	Super Formula Lights	RS Fine	17	0	0	0	1	38	5th
2020	Super Taikyū - ST-1	ROOKIE Racing	4	4	4	4	4	121‡	**1st‡**
2020	Super Taikyū - ST-1	ADVICS muta Racing	1	0	0	0	1	50‡	**2nd‡**
2021	Super GT - GT300	LM corsa	8	2	0	2	2	49	**3rd**
2021	Super Formula Lights	RS Fine	16	0	0	0	3	29.5	6th
2021	Super Taikyū - ST-Q	ROOKIE Racing	1	1	1	1	1	N/A	N/A
2022	Super GT - GT300	LM corsa	8	0	0	0	0	11	23rd
2022	Super Taikyū - ST-4	TOM'S Spirit	5	5	5	3	5	177.5‡	**1st‡**
2023	Super GT - GT300	LM corsa	8	0	0	0	0	8	22nd
2023	Super Taikyū - ST-4	TOM's Spirit	6	1	0	6	5	100.5‡	**3rd‡**
2023	Lamborghini Super Trofeo Asia - Pro-Am	Promotion Racing	2	0	0	0	1	N/A	NC
2024	Super GT - GT300	LM corsa	8	0	0	0	0	4	18th
2024	Super Taikyu - ST-Q	GR Team Spirit	5	5	5	0	5	0‡	NC‡
2024	Lamborghini Super Trofeo Asia - Pro	Promotion Racing	2	0	1	0	0	N/A	NC†
2025	Super GT - GT300	LM corsa	8	0	1	0	0	29	19th
2025	Super Taikyu - ST-Q	GR Team Spirit	6	1	1	0	4	0‡	NC‡
2025	Super GT - GT300	LM corsa	8	1	0	1	1	29	19th
2025	Super Taikyu - ST-Q	GR Team Spirit						0‡	NC‡
2026	Super Taikyu - ST-Q	GR Team Spirit							
2026	Super GT - GT300	LM corsa	8	1	1	1	1	41	16th

‡ Team standings

=== Complete F4 Japanese Championship results ===
(key) (Races in bold indicate pole position) (Races in italics indicate fastest lap)

Year	Team	1	2	3	4	5	6	7	8	9	10	11	12	13	14	DC	Pts
2015	RS Fine	OKA; 1; 10	OKA; 2; 20	FUJ1; 1; 17	FUJ1; 2; 21	FUJ2; 1; 17	FUJ2; 2; 18	SUZ; 1; 9	SUZ; 2; 9	SUG; 1; 3	SUG; 2; 2	AUT; 1; 10	AUT; 2; 10	MOT; 1; 9	MOT; 2; 6	8th	42
2016	Field Motorsport	OKA; 1; 7	OKA; 2 Ret	FUJ1; 1 Ret	FUJ1; 2; 5	SUG; 1; 6	SUG; 2 Ret	FUJ2; 1; 9	FUJ2; 2; 6	FUJ2; 3; 26	SUZ; 1; 13	SUZ; 2; 9	MOT; 1; 2	MOT; 2; 11	MOT; 3; 5	10th	64
2017	HubAuto Racing	OKA; 1; 11	OKA; 2; 11	FUJ1; 1; 6	FUJ1; 2; 6	AUT; 1; 5	AUT; 2; 8	SUG; 1; 8	SUG; 2; 6	FUJ2; 1; 4	FUJ2; 2; 5	SUZ; 1; 5	SUZ; 2; 5	MOT; 1; 10	MOT; 2; 12	7th	85

=== Complete Japanese Formula 3 Championship results ===
(key) (Races in bold indicate pole position; races in italics indicate fastest lap)

Year	Team	Engine	1	2	3	4	5	6	7	8	9	10	11	12	13	14	15	16	17	18	19	20	21	DC	Pts
2018	RS Fine	Mercedes-Benz	SUZ; 1; 10	SUZ; 2; 8	SUG1; 1; 8	SUG1; 2; 9	FUJ1; 1; 6	FUJ1; 2; 5	OKA1; 1; 5	OKA1; 2; 8	OKA1; 3 C	MOT; 1; 7	MOT; 2; 7	MOT; 3; 6	OKA2; 1; 8	OKA2; 2; 8	OKA2; 3 C	SUG2; 1; 11	SUG2; 2; 9	SUG2; 3; 8	SUG2; 4; 8	FUJ2; 1; 3	FUJ2; 2; 5	8th	13
2019	RS Fine	Mercedes-Benz	SUZ; 1; 7	SUZ; 2; 5	AUT; 1; 4	AUT; 2; 4	AUT; 3; 8	OKA; 1; 7	OKA; 2; 8	OKA; 3; 7	SUG; 1; 8	SUG; 2; 7	FUJ; 1; 6	FUJ; 2 Ret	SUG; 1; 8	SUG; 2; 9	SUG; 3; 9	MOT; 1; 7	MOT; 2; 6	MOT; 3 Ret	OKA; 1; 8	OKA; 2; 11		10th	10

=== Complete Super Formula Lights results ===
(key) (Races in bold indicate pole position) (Races in italics indicate fastest lap)

Year	Entrant	1	2	3	4	5	6	7	8	9	10	11	12	13	14	15	16	17	18	Pos	Points
2020	RS Fine	MOT; 1; 7	MOT; 2; 5	MOT; 3; 7	OKA; 1; 6	OKA; 2 Ret	SUG; 1; 4	SUG; 2; 4	SUG; 3; 4	AUT; 1; 4	AUT; 2; 5	AUT; 3; 5	SUZ; 1; 3	SUZ; 2; 4	SUZ; 3; 4	FUJ; 1; 5	FUJ; 2; 5	FUJ; 3; 5		5th	38
2021	RS Fine	FUJ; 1; 5	FUJ; 2; 7	FUJ; 3 Ret	SUZ; 1; 6	SUZ; 2; 7	SUZ; 3; 6	AUT; 1; 3	AUT; 2; 3	AUT; 3 C	SUG; 1; 4	SUG; 2 Ret	SUG; 3; 5	MOT1; 1; 4	MOT1; 2; 6	MOT1; 3; 4	MOT2; 1; 8	MOT2; 2; 3	MOT2; 3; 6	6th	29.5

=== Complete Super GT results ===
Year	Team	Car	Class	1	2	3	4	5	6	7	8	9	DC	Points
2020	LM corsa	Lexus RC F GT3	GT300	FUJ; 13	FUJ; 16	SUZ; 17	MOT; 12	FUJ; 22	SUZ; 14	MOT; 12	FUJ; 9		27th	2
2021	LM corsa	Toyota GR Supra GT300	GT300	OKA; 8	FUJ; 1	SUZ; 12	MOT; 14	SUG; 5	AUT; 19	MOT; 11	FUJ; 1		3rd	49
2022	LM corsa	Toyota GR Supra GT300	GT300	OKA; 12	FUJ; 17	SUZ; 9	FUJ; 4	SUZ; 10	SUG; 15	AUT; 22	MOT; 11		23rd	11
2023	LM corsa	Toyota GR Supra GT300	GT300	OKA; 8	FUJ; 23†	SUZ; 7	FUJ; 10	SUZ; 12	SUG; 21	AUT; 20	MOT; 15		22nd	8
2024	LM corsa	Toyota GR Supra GT300	GT300	OKA; 12	FUJ; 20	SUZ; 10	FUJ; 14	SUG; 9	AUT; 10	MOT; 12	SUZ; 14		18th	4
2025	LM corsa	Lexus LC 500 GT	GT300	OKA; 14	FUJ; 15	SEP; 15	FS1; 18	FS2 (16)	SUZ; DSQ	SUG; 1	AUT; 20	MOT; 16	19th	29
2026	LM corsa	Lexus LC 500 GT	GT300	OKA; 10	FUJ; 16	FUJ; 11	SUZ; 13	**SUG**; 1	AUT; 24†	MOT; 15	MOT; 19		16th	41

^{‡} Half points awarded as less than 75% of race distance was completed.
^{(Number)} Driver did not take part in this sprint race, points are still awarded for the teammate's result.
^{*} Season still in progress.
