= 2018 Japanese Formula 3 Championship =

The 2018 Japanese Formula 3 Championship was the 40th Japanese Formula 3 Championship season.

== Teams and drivers ==
Team	Chasis	Engine	No.	Driver	Status	Rounds
B-Max Racing Team	Dallara F312	Volkswagen A41 (0XY)	1	(Japan) Yu Kanamaru		All
B-Max Racing Team	Dallara F312	Volkswagen A41 (0XY)	3	(Japan) Ai Miura		All
B-Max Racing Team	Dallara F312	Volkswagen A41 (0XY)	21	(Brazil) Bruno Carneiro		1
B-Max Racing Team	Dallara F312	Volkswagen A41 (0XY)	21	(Japan) Kazuki Hiramine		2
B-Max Racing Team	Dallara F312	Volkswagen A41 (0XY)	21	(Japan) "Syuji"		3
B-Max Racing Team	Dallara F312	Volkswagen A41 (0XY)	21	(Japan) Masayuki Ueda		4
B-Max Racing Team	Dallara F312	Volkswagen A41 (0XY)	21	(Japan) Kiyoto Fujinami		5, 7
B-Max Racing Team	Dallara F312	Volkswagen A41 (0XY)	21	(Japan) Takashi Hata		6
B-Max Racing Team	Dallara F312	Volkswagen A41 (0XY)	21	(Japan) Shinji Sawada		8
B-Max Engineering	Dallara F312	Volkswagen A41 (0XY)	13	(Japan) Hideki Hirota		1
B-Max Engineering	Dallara F312	Volkswagen A41 (0XY)	13	(Japan) Motoyoshi Yoshida		2–8
B-Max Engineering	Dallara F314	Volkswagen A41 (0XY)	30	(Japan) "Dragon"		All
Toda Racing	Dallara F316	Toda TR-F301	2	(Japan) Sena Sakaguchi		All
Toda Racing	Dallara F316	Toda TR-F301	93	(Japan) Toshiki Oyu		All
Hanashima Racing	Dallara F312	Toyota TOM'S TAZ31	5	(Japan) Katsuaki Kubota		4–5
Hanashima Racing	Dallara F312	Toyota TOM'S TAZ31	5	(Japan) Kazuto Kotaka		7
Hanashima Racing	Dallara F312	Toyota TOM'S TAZ31	5	(Japan) Riki Okusa		8
OIRC Team YTB	Dallara F318	Mercedes-Benz F3-414	8	(Japan) Yoshiaki Katayama		All
NODA Racing	Dallara F312	Volkswagen A18	10	(Australia) Jake Parsons	N	All
ThreeBond Racing	Dallara F318	ThreeBond Tomei TB14F3	12	(Japan) Ukyo Sasahara		All
Albirex Racing Team	Dallara F315	Mercedes-Benz F3-414	14	(Japan) Yuki Nemoto		1–3, 5–7
Albirex Racing Team	Dallara F315	Mercedes-Benz F3-414	14	(Japan) Tatsuya Ota		8
Tairoku Racing	Dallara F316	Volkswagen A41 (0XY)	28	(Japan) Tairoku Yamaguchi		All
RS Fine	Dallara F318	Mercedes-Benz F3-414	35	(Japan) Shunsuke Kohno		All
Corolla Chukyo Kuo TOM'S	Dallara F317	Toyota TOM'S TAZ31	36	(Japan) Sho Tsuboi		All
Corolla Chukyo Kuo TOM'S	Dallara F317	Toyota TOM'S TAZ31	37	(Japan) Ritomo Miyata		All

Icon	Class
N	National class.

== Race calendar and results ==
Calendar for the 2018 season. All races are scheduled to be held in Japan.

Race 9 at Okayama International Circuit was postponed due to severe weather conditions. The race was rescheduled for a later round at the same circuit, and was subsequently postponed again to be run at Sportsland SUGO.

Round		Circuit	Date	Pole position	Fastest lap	Winning driver	Winning team	National winner	Supporting
1	R1	Suzuka Circuit	21 April	(Japan) Ritomo Miyata	(Japan) Sho Tsuboi	(Japan) Sho Tsuboi	Corolla Chukyo Kuo TOM'S	(Australia) Jake Parsons	Super Formula
1	R2	Suzuka Circuit	21 April	(Japan) Sho Tsuboi	(Japan) Sho Tsuboi	(Japan) Sho Tsuboi	Corolla Chukyo Kuo TOM'S	(Australia) Jake Parsons	Super Formula
2	R1	Sportsland SUGO	26 May	(Japan) Sho Tsuboi	(Japan) Sho Tsuboi	(Japan) Sho Tsuboi	Corolla Chukyo Kuo TOM'S	(Australia) Jake Parsons	Super Formula
2	R2	Sportsland SUGO	27 May	(Japan) Sho Tsuboi	(Japan) Ritomo Miyata	(Japan) Sho Tsuboi	Corolla Chukyo Kuo TOM'S	(Australia) Jake Parsons	Super Formula
3	R1	Fuji Speedway	7 July	(Japan) Sho Tsuboi	(Japan) Ukyo Sasahara	(Japan) Sho Tsuboi	Corolla Chukyo Kuo TOM'S	(Australia) Jake Parsons	Super Formula
3	R2	Fuji Speedway	8 July	(Japan) Sho Tsuboi	(Japan) Sho Tsuboi	(Japan) Ritomo Miyata	Corolla Chukyo Kuo TOM'S	(Australia) Jake Parsons	Super Formula
4	R1	Okayama International Circuit	28 July	(Japan) Ritomo Miyata	(Japan) Sho Tsuboi	(Japan) Ritomo Miyata	Corolla Chukyo Kuo TOM'S	(Australia) Jake Parsons	
4	R2	Okayama International Circuit	28 July	(Japan) Sho Tsuboi	(Japan) Sho Tsuboi	(Japan) Sho Tsuboi	Corolla Chukyo Kuo TOM'S	(Australia) Jake Parsons	
4	R3	Okayama International Circuit	29 July	Race postponed due to weather conditions					
5	R1	Twin Ring Motegi	18 August	(Japan) Sho Tsuboi	(Japan) Sho Tsuboi	(Japan) Sho Tsuboi	Corolla Chukyo Kuo TOM'S	(Australia) Jake Parsons	Super Formula
5	R2	Twin Ring Motegi	19 August	(Japan) Sho Tsuboi	(Japan) Sho Tsuboi	(Japan) Sho Tsuboi	Corolla Chukyo Kuo TOM'S	(Australia) Jake Parsons	Super Formula
5	R3	Twin Ring Motegi	19 August		(Japan) Sho Tsuboi	(Japan) Sho Tsuboi	Corolla Chukyo Kuo TOM'S	(Australia) Jake Parsons	Super Formula
6	R1	Okayama International Circuit	8 September	(Japan) Sho Tsuboi	(Japan) Sho Tsuboi	(Japan) Sho Tsuboi	Corolla Chukyo Kuo TOM'S	(Australia) Jake Parsons	Super Formula
6	R2	Okayama International Circuit	9 September	(Japan) Sho Tsuboi	(Japan) Sho Tsuboi	(Japan) Sho Tsuboi	Corolla Chukyo Kuo TOM'S	(Australia) Jake Parsons	Super Formula
6	R3	Okayama International Circuit	9 September	Race postponed due to weather conditions					Super Formula
7	R1	Sportsland SUGO	29 September	(Japan) Sho Tsuboi	(Japan) Sho Tsuboi	(Japan) Sho Tsuboi	Corolla Chukyo Kuo TOM'S	(Australia) Jake Parsons	
7	R2	Sportsland SUGO	29 September	(Japan) Sho Tsuboi	(Japan) Ritomo Miyata	(Japan) Sho Tsuboi	Corolla Chukyo Kuo TOM'S	(Australia) Jake Parsons	
7	R3	Sportsland SUGO	30 September		(Japan) Sho Tsuboi	(Japan) Sho Tsuboi	Corolla Chukyo Kuo TOM'S	(Australia) Jake Parsons	
7	R4	Sportsland SUGO	30 September		(Japan) Sho Tsuboi	(Japan) Sho Tsuboi	Corolla Chukyo Kuo TOM'S	No finishers	
8	R1	Fuji Speedway	13 October	(Japan) Sho Tsuboi	(Japan) Sho Tsuboi	(Japan) Sho Tsuboi	Corolla Chukyo Kuo TOM'S	(Australia) Jake Parsons	FIA World Endurance Championship
8	R2	Fuji Speedway	14 October	(Japan) Sho Tsuboi	(Japan) Sho Tsuboi	(Japan) Sho Tsuboi	Corolla Chukyo Kuo TOM'S	(Australia) Jake Parsons	FIA World Endurance Championship

== Championship standings ==
- Points are awarded as follows:

1	2	3	4	5	6	PP	FL
10	7	5	3	2	1	1	1

=== Drivers' Championships ===
==== Overall ====
Pos	Driver	SUZ		SUG1		FUJ1		OKA1			MOT			OKA2			SUG2				FUJ2		Points
1	(Japan) Sho Tsuboi	1	1	1	1	1	2	2	1	C	1	1	1	1	1	C	1	1	1	1	1	1	214
2	(Japan) Ritomo Miyata	2	2	2	2	8	1	1	2	C	2	2	2	5	3	C	2	2	4	2	6	3	117
3	(Japan) Ukyo Sasahara	4	7	5	5	3	3	3	7	C	Ret	4	7	4	2	C	3	3	2	3	Ret	2	65
4	(Japan) Sena Sakaguchi	3	3	4	3	2	4	6	4	C	5	5	9	Ret	4	C	8	5	Ret	4	2	6	52
5	(Japan) Yu Kanamaru	5	5	6	8	5	6	4	6	C	4	3	4	2	9	C	4	7	3	5	13	Ret	40
6	(Japan) Toshiki Oyu	14	9	3	4	4	Ret	9	3	C	3	6	3	Ret	5	C	6	4	Ret	DNS	4	4	39
7	(Japan) Yoshiaki Katayama	Ret	4	7	6	7	14	7	6	C	6	Ret	5	7	7	C	5	6	5	9	11	Ret	14
8	(Japan) Shunsuke Kohno	10	8	8	9	6	5	5	8	C	7	7	6	8	8	C	11	9	8	8	3	5	13
9	(Japan) Yuki Nemoto	9	10	9	7	9	8				8	13	8	3	6	C	13	10	6	Ret			7
10	(Japan) Riki Okusa																				5	9	2
11	(Brazil) Bruno Carneiro	6	6																				2
12	(Japan) Ai Miura	7	11	11	12	Ret	7	8	9	C	10	9	11	6	10	C	16	13	10	12	7	8	1
13	(Japan) Kazuto Kotaka																7	8	Ret	6			1
14	(Japan) Kiyoto Fujinami										9	8	10				9	14	7	7			0
15	(Japan) Tatsuya Ota																				10	7	0
16	(Japan) Tairoku Yamaguchi	8	12	12	11	11	9	10	10	C	12	12	13	9	13	C	12	12	11	10	8	11	0
17	(Japan) "Dragon"	11	Ret	Ret	13	10	10	11	11	C	11	10	12	11	12	C	10	11	Ret	11	9	10	0
18	(Australia) Jake Parsons	13	13	13	14	12	11	14	13	C	14	14	15	10	11	C	14	15	9	DNS	14	12	0
19	(Japan) Kazuki Hiramine			10	10																		0
20	(Japan) Katsuaki Kubota							12	12	C	13	11	14										0
21	(Japan) Motoyoshi Yoshida			14	15	14	13	15	15	C	15	15	16	13	15	C	15	16	12	Ret	12	13	0
22	(Japan) Syuji					13	12																0
23	(Japan) Hideki Hirota	12	14																				0
24	(Japan) Takashi Hata													12	14	C							0
25	(Japan) Masayuki Ueda							13	14	C													0
Pos	Driver	SUZ		SUG1		FUJ1		OKA1			MOT			OKA2			SUG2				FUJ2		Points

==== National Class ====
Pos	Driver	SUZ		SUG1		FUJ1		OKA1			MOT			OKA2			SUG2				FUJ2		Points
1	(Australia) Jake Parsons	13	13	13	14	12	11	14	13	C	14	14	15	10	11	C	14	15	9	DNS	14	12	214

=== Teams Championship ===
Pos.	Team	Points
1	Corolla Chukyo Kuo TOM'S	190
2	Toda Racing	68
3	ThreeBond Racing	64
4	B-Max Racing with Motopark	40
5	OIRC by team YTB	14
6	RS Fine	13
7	Albirex Racing Team	7
8	Hanashima Racing	3
NC	Noda Racing	13
NC	Tairoku Racing	0
Ref:

=== Engine tuner standings ===
Pos.	Engine tuner	Points
1	TOM'S	190
2	Toda Racing	168
3	Tomei Engine	64
2	Spiess Motorenbau Gmbh	40
5	HWA AG	39
