= 2023 Super GT Series =

Sports car racing season in Japan

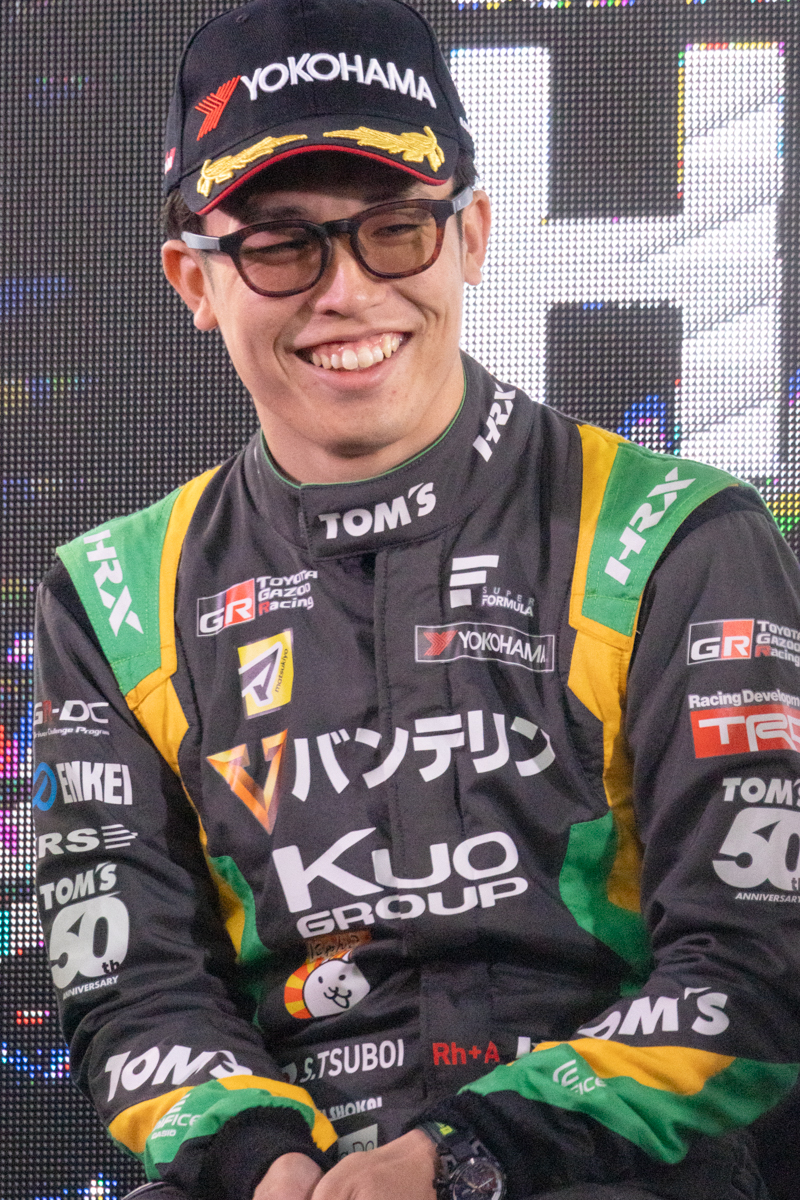
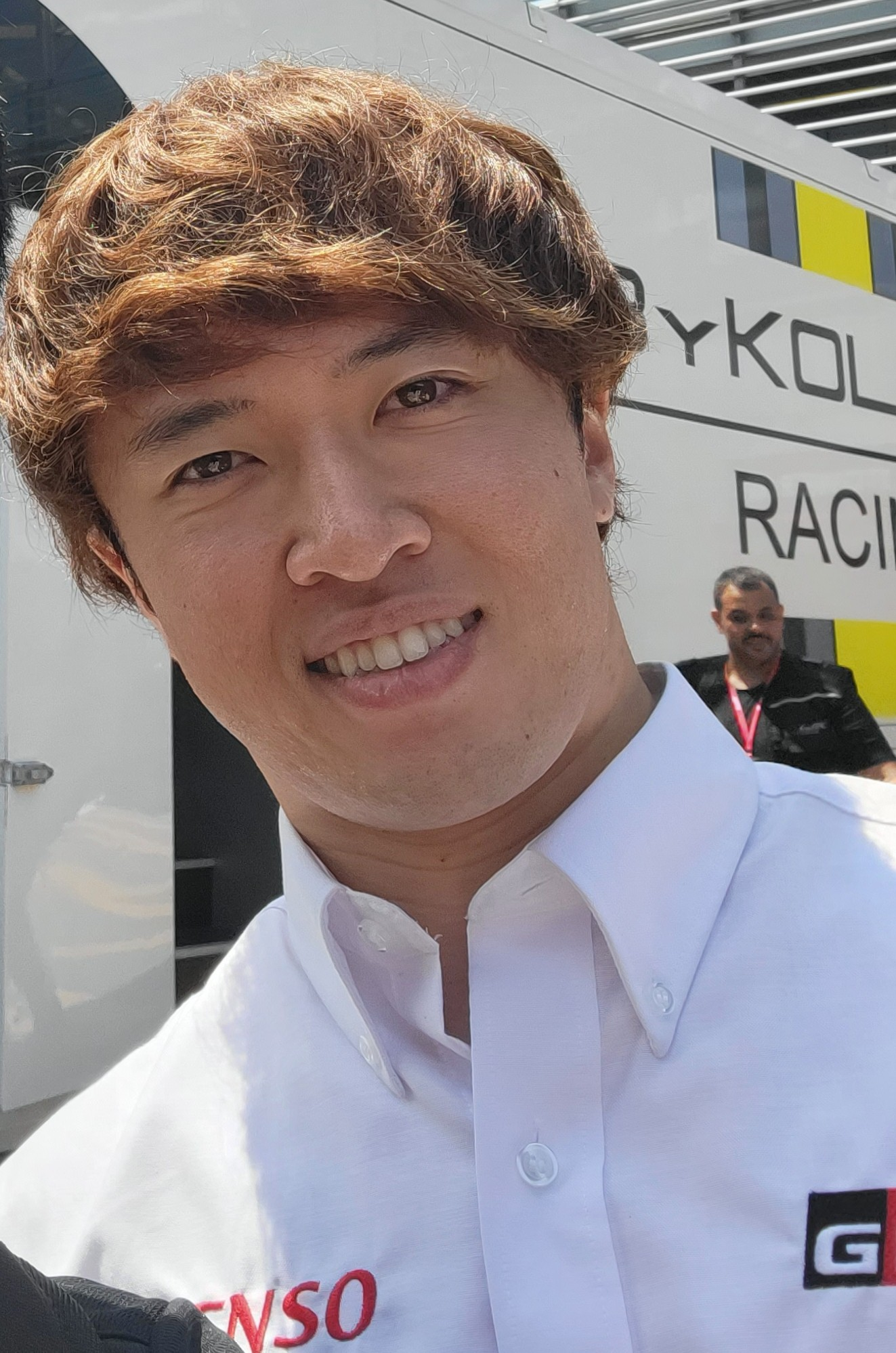
Sho Tsuboi & Ritomo Miyata were the GT500 driver's champion, driving for TGR Team au TOM'S, who were the GT500 teams' champions

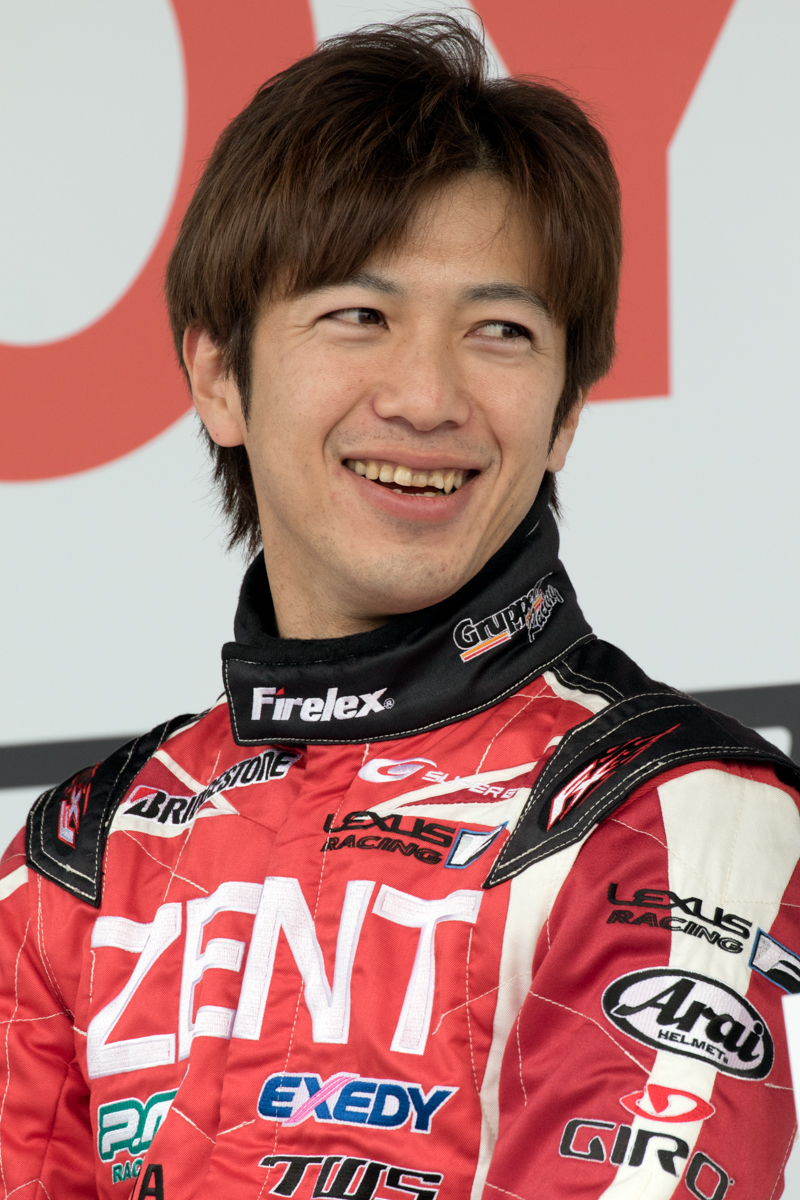
The 2023 Super GT Series was the last season for the three-time GT500 champion Yuji Tachikawa (pictured in 2015), having participated in the series since 1996.

The 2023 Autobacs Super GT Series was a motor racing championship based in Japan for grand touring cars, sanctioned by the Japan Automobile Federation (JAF) and ran by the GT Association (GTA). It was the thirty-first season of the JAF Super GT Championship, which included the All Japan Grand Touring Car Championship era, and the nineteenth season under the Super GT name. It was also the forty-first overall season of a national JAF sportscar championship dating back to the All Japan Endurance/Sports Prototype Championship.

Team Impul and drivers Kazuki Hiramine and Bertrand Baguette entered the season as the defending GT500 champions, while Kondo Racing and driver João Paulo de Oliveira entered the season as the defending GT300 champions. This was the final season for three-time GT500 champion, Yuji Tachikawa, who announced his retirement at the end of the season.

TGR Team au TOM'S won the championship in the GT500 class after having won the previous title in the 2021 season, with Sho Tsuboi and Ritomo Miyata won the Drivers' Championship. In the GT300 class, Saitama Toyopet GreenBrave, Hiroki Yoshida and Kohta Kawaai won the Teams' and Drivers' Championship. Both class championships were won by Toyota teams driving the respective GT500 and GT300 versions of the Toyota GR Supra.

== Calendar ==
A confirmed eight round provisional 2023 calendar was announced on 8 August 2022. On 28 December 2022, the dates of Sugo and Autopolis rounds were changed. On 20 February 2023, distances and formats for all rounds were confirmed. Both races at Fuji Speedway and Suzuka Circuit, plus the penultimate round at Autopolis, would be 450 kilometre races requiring at least two green flag pit stops for refuelling. Also, the first and final rounds of the championship will no longer require teams to change tyres on their compulsory pit stops.

Round	Race	Circuit	Location	Dates	Map
1	Okayama GT 300km Race	(Okayama Prefecture) Okayama International Circuit	Mimasaka-shi, Okayama-ken	15–16 April	2023 Super GT Series is located in Japan
2	Fujimaki Group Fuji GT 450km Race	(Shizuoka Prefecture) Fuji Speedway	Oyama-chō, Shizuoka-ken	3–4 May	2023 Super GT Series is located in Japan
3	Suzuka GT 450km Race	(Mie Prefecture) Suzuka Circuit	Suzuka-shi, Mie-ken	3–4 June	2023 Super GT Series is located in Japan
4	Fuji GT 450km Race	(Shizuoka Prefecture) Fuji Speedway	Oyama-chō, Shizuoka-ken	5–6 August	2023 Super GT Series is located in Japan
5	Suzuka GT 450km Race	(Mie Prefecture) Suzuka Circuit	Suzuka-shi, Mie-ken	26–27 August	2023 Super GT Series is located in Japan
6	Sugo GT 300km Race	(Miyagi Prefecture) Sportsland Sugo	Murata-machi, Miyagi-ken	16–17 September	2023 Super GT Series is located in Japan
7	Autopolis GT 450km Race	(Ōita Prefecture) Autopolis	Hita-shi, Ōita-ken	14–15 October	2023 Super GT Series is located in Japan
8	Motegi GT 300km Race	(Tochigi Prefecture) Mobility Resort Motegi	Motegi-machi, Tochigi-ken	4–5 November	2023 Super GT Series is located in Japan

== Regulation changes ==
GTA chairman Masaaki Bandoh outlined the series' environmental initiative plans in November 2022, known as the "Super GT Green Project 2030". The series aims to reduce carbon emissions by 50 percent by 2030. As part of this initiative, Super GT made the following regulation changes for 2023:

- Super GT debuted a new, 100 percent sustainable carbon-neutral fuel manufactured by ETS Racing Fuels, a division of Haltermann Carless GmbH. The new ETS Renewablaze GTA R100 racing fuel was introduced to GT500 for the first round of the championship. The GT300 class will continue to use petroleum fuel for the season after feedback gathered in testing.
- The number of tyre sets available to teams per race weekend has been limited to five sets of dry tyres and six sets of wet tyres for 300 kilometre race meetings, one set fewer for each than in 2022. The number of tyre sets available for 450km races would be determined on a case-by-case basis. Ultimately, there would be six sets of dry tyres and seven sets of wet tyres available at all five 450km races, one set fewer for each than in 2022.

== Teams and drivers ==
On 20 February, 2023, the GTA released the series entry list, featuring 15 entries in the GT500 class and 27 entries in the GT300 class. All teams compete under a Japanese license.

=== GT500 ===
Team	Make	Car	Engine	No.	Drivers	Tyre	Rounds
Team Impul	Nissan	Nissan Z GT500	Nissan NR4S21 2.0 L Turbo I4	1	(Japan) Kazuki Hiramine	B	All
Team Impul	Nissan	Nissan Z GT500	Nissan NR4S21 2.0 L Turbo I4	1	(Belgium) Bertrand Baguette	B	All
NDDP Racing	Nissan	Nissan Z GT500	Nissan NR4S21 2.0 L Turbo I4	3	(Japan) Katsumasa Chiyo	M	All
NDDP Racing	Nissan	Nissan Z GT500	Nissan NR4S21 2.0 L Turbo I4	3	(Japan) Mitsunori Takaboshi	M	All
NISMO	Nissan	Nissan Z GT500	Nissan NR4S21 2.0 L Turbo I4	23	(Japan) Tsugio Matsuda	M	All
NISMO	Nissan	Nissan Z GT500	Nissan NR4S21 2.0 L Turbo I4	23	(Italy) Ronnie Quintarelli	M	All
ARTA (Note: The team is operated by Mugen, and their cars are entered as ARTA Mugen NSX-GTs.)	Honda	Honda NSX-GT	Honda HR-420E 2.0 L Turbo I4	8	(Japan) Tomoki Nojiri	B	All
ARTA	Honda	Honda NSX-GT	Honda HR-420E 2.0 L Turbo I4	8	(Japan) Toshiki Oyu	B	All
ARTA	Honda	Honda NSX-GT	Honda HR-420E 2.0 L Turbo I4	8	(Japan) Iori Kimura	B	4
ARTA	Honda	Honda NSX-GT	Honda HR-420E 2.0 L Turbo I4	16	(Japan) Nirei Fukuzumi	B	All
ARTA	Honda	Honda NSX-GT	Honda HR-420E 2.0 L Turbo I4	16	(Japan) Hiroki Otsu	B	All
TGR Team ENEOS ROOKIE	Toyota GR	Toyota GR Supra GT500	Toyota RI4AG 2.0 L Turbo I4	14	(Japan) Kazuya Oshima	B	All
TGR Team ENEOS ROOKIE	Toyota GR	Toyota GR Supra GT500	Toyota RI4AG 2.0 L Turbo I4	14	(Japan) Kenta Yamashita	B	All
Astemo REAL Racing	Honda	Honda NSX-GT	Honda HR-420E 2.0 L Turbo I4	17	(Japan) Koudai Tsukakoshi	B	All
Astemo REAL Racing	Honda	Honda NSX-GT	Honda HR-420E 2.0 L Turbo I4	17	(Japan) Nobuharu Matsushita	B	All
TGR Team WedsSport Bandoh	Toyota GR	Toyota GR Supra GT500	Toyota RI4AG 2.0 L Turbo I4	19	(Japan) Yuji Kunimoto	Y	All
TGR Team WedsSport Bandoh	Toyota GR	Toyota GR Supra GT500	Toyota RI4AG 2.0 L Turbo I4	19	(Japan) Sena Sakaguchi	Y	All
Kondo Racing	Nissan	Nissan Z GT500	Nissan NR4S21 2.0 L Turbo I4	24	(Japan) Daiki Sasaki	Y	All
Kondo Racing	Nissan	Nissan Z GT500	Nissan NR4S21 2.0 L Turbo I4	24	(Japan) Kohei Hirate	Y	All
TGR Team au TOM'S	Toyota GR	Toyota GR Supra GT500	Toyota RI4AG 2.0 L Turbo I4	36	(Japan) Sho Tsuboi	B	All
TGR Team au TOM'S	Toyota GR	Toyota GR Supra GT500	Toyota RI4AG 2.0 L Turbo I4	36	(Japan) Ritomo Miyata	B	All
TGR Team Deloitte TOM'S	Toyota GR	Toyota GR Supra GT500	Toyota RI4AG 2.0 L Turbo I4	37	(Japan) Ukyo Sasahara	B	All
TGR Team Deloitte TOM'S	Toyota GR	Toyota GR Supra GT500	Toyota RI4AG 2.0 L Turbo I4	37	(France) Giuliano Alesi	B	All
TGR Team ZENT Cerumo	Toyota GR	Toyota GR Supra GT500	Toyota RI4AG 2.0 L Turbo I4	38	(Japan) Yuji Tachikawa	B	All
TGR Team ZENT Cerumo	Toyota GR	Toyota GR Supra GT500	Toyota RI4AG 2.0 L Turbo I4	38	(Japan) Hiroaki Ishiura	B	All
TGR Team SARD	Toyota GR	Toyota GR Supra GT500	Toyota RI4AG 2.0 L Turbo I4	39	(Japan) Yuhi Sekiguchi	B	All
TGR Team SARD	Toyota GR	Toyota GR Supra GT500	Toyota RI4AG 2.0 L Turbo I4	39	(Japan) Yuichi Nakayama	B	All
Modulo Nakajima Racing	Honda	Honda NSX-GT	Honda HR-420E 2.0 L Turbo I4	64	(Japan) Takuya Izawa	D	All
Modulo Nakajima Racing	Honda	Honda NSX-GT	Honda HR-420E 2.0 L Turbo I4	64	(Japan) Kakunoshin Ohta	D	All
Team Kunimitsu	Honda	Honda NSX-GT	Honda HR-420E 2.0 L Turbo I4	100	(Japan) Tadasuke Makino	B	All
Team Kunimitsu	Honda	Honda NSX-GT	Honda HR-420E 2.0 L Turbo I4	100	(Japan) Naoki Yamamoto	B	1–6
Team Kunimitsu	Honda	Honda NSX-GT	Honda HR-420E 2.0 L Turbo I4	100	(Japan) Iori Kimura	B	7–8

=== GT300 ===
Team	Make	Car	Engine	No.	Drivers	Tyre	Rounds
muta Racing INGING	Toyota GR	Toyota GR86 GT300	Toyota 2UR-GSE 5.4 L V8	2	(Japan) Yuui Tsutsumi	B	All
muta Racing INGING	Toyota GR	Toyota GR86 GT300	Toyota 2UR-GSE 5.4 L V8	2	(Japan) Hibiki Taira	B	All
muta Racing INGING	Toyota GR	Toyota GR86 GT300	Toyota 2UR-GSE 5.4 L V8	2	(Japan) Hiroki Katoh	B	2–5, 7
Goodsmile Racing & Team UKYO	Mercedes-AMG	Mercedes-AMG GT3 Evo	Mercedes-AMG M159 6.2 L V8	4	(Japan) Nobuteru Taniguchi	Y	All
Goodsmile Racing & Team UKYO	Mercedes-AMG	Mercedes-AMG GT3 Evo	Mercedes-AMG M159 6.2 L V8	4	(Japan) Tatsuya Kataoka	Y	All
Team Mach	Toyota	Toyota 86 MC GT300	GTA V8 4.5 L V8	5	(Japan) Yusuke Tomibayashi	Y	All
Team Mach	Toyota	Toyota 86 MC GT300	GTA V8 4.5 L V8	5	(Japan) Takamitsu Matsui	Y	All
Team LeMans	Audi	Audi R8 LMS Evo II	Audi DAR 5.2 L V10	6	(Japan) Yoshiaki Katayama	Y	All
Team LeMans	Audi	Audi R8 LMS Evo II	Audi DAR 5.2 L V10	6	(Spain) Roberto Merhi Muntan	Y	1–2, 4–8
Team LeMans	Audi	Audi R8 LMS Evo II	Audi DAR 5.2 L V10	6	(Japan) Seiya Jin	Y	2–5, 7
BMW M Team Studie × CRS	BMW M	BMW M4 GT3	BMW P58 3.0 L Twin Turbo I6	7	(Japan) Seiji Ara	M	All
BMW M Team Studie × CRS	BMW M	BMW M4 GT3	BMW P58 3.0 L Twin Turbo I6	7	(Canada) Bruno Spengler	M	1, 5–8
BMW M Team Studie × CRS	BMW M	BMW M4 GT3	BMW P58 3.0 L Twin Turbo I6	7	(Japan) Masataka Yanagida	M	2–4
Pacific Racing Team	Mercedes-AMG	Mercedes-AMG GT3 Evo	Mercedes-AMG M159 6.2 L V8	9	(Japan) Ryohei Sakaguchi	Y	All
Pacific Racing Team	Mercedes-AMG	Mercedes-AMG GT3 Evo	Mercedes-AMG M159 6.2 L V8	9	(China) Liang Jiatong	Y	All
Pacific Racing Team	Mercedes-AMG	Mercedes-AMG GT3 Evo	Mercedes-AMG M159 6.2 L V8	9	(Japan) Shintaro Kawabata	Y	2–5, 7
GAINER	Nissan	Nissan GT-R Nismo GT3	Nissan VR38DETT 3.8 L Twin Turbo V6	10	(Japan) Hironobu Yasuda	D	All
GAINER	Nissan	Nissan GT-R Nismo GT3	Nissan VR38DETT 3.8 L Twin Turbo V6	10	(Japan) Riki Okusa	D	All
GAINER	Nissan	Nissan GT-R Nismo GT3	Nissan VR38DETT 3.8 L Twin Turbo V6	11	(Japan) Ryuichiro Tomita	D	All
GAINER	Nissan	Nissan GT-R Nismo GT3	Nissan VR38DETT 3.8 L Twin Turbo V6	11	(Japan) Keishi Ishikawa	D	All
GAINER	Nissan	Nissan GT-R Nismo GT3	Nissan VR38DETT 3.8 L Twin Turbo V6	11	(Japan) Yusuke Shiotsu	D	2–5, 7
Team UpGarage (Note: Car No. 18 entered as Team UpGarage, and car No. 27 entered as Yogibo Racing)	Honda	Honda NSX GT3 Evo22	Honda JNC1 3.5 L Twin Turbo V6	18	(Japan) Takashi Kobayashi	Y	All
Team UpGarage	Honda	Honda NSX GT3 Evo22	Honda JNC1 3.5 L Twin Turbo V6	18	(Japan) Syun Koide	Y	All
Yogibo Racing	Honda	Honda NSX GT3 Evo22	Honda JNC1 3.5 L Twin Turbo V6	27	(Japan) Yugo Iwasawa	Y	All
Yogibo Racing	Honda	Honda NSX GT3 Evo22	Honda JNC1 3.5 L Twin Turbo V6	27	(Japan) Reimei Ito	Y	All
SHADE Racing	Toyota GR	Toyota GR86 GT300	Toyota 2UR-GSE 5.4 L V8	20	(Japan) Katsuyuki Hiranaka	D	All
SHADE Racing	Toyota GR	Toyota GR86 GT300	Toyota 2UR-GSE 5.4 L V8	20	(Japan) Eijiro Shimizu	D	All
SHADE Racing	Toyota GR	Toyota GR86 GT300	Toyota 2UR-GSE 5.4 L V8	20	(Japan) Shinnosuke Yamada	D	2–5, 7
R'Qs Motor Sports (Note: Car No. 22 entered as R'Qs Motor Sports, and car No. 50 entered as Anest Iwata Racing with Arnage) Anest Iwata Racing with Arnage	Mercedes-AMG	Mercedes-AMG GT3 Evo	Mercedes-AMG M159 6.2 L V8	22	(Japan) Hisashi Wada	Y	All
R'Qs Motor Sports Anest Iwata Racing with Arnage	Mercedes-AMG	Mercedes-AMG GT3 Evo	Mercedes-AMG M159 6.2 L V8	22	(Japan) Masaki Jyonai	Y	All
R'Qs Motor Sports Anest Iwata Racing with Arnage	Mercedes-AMG	Mercedes-AMG GT3 Evo	Mercedes-AMG M159 6.2 L V8	22	(Japan) Masaki Kano	Y	2–5, 7
R'Qs Motor Sports Anest Iwata Racing with Arnage	Lexus	Lexus RC F GT3	Lexus 2UR-GSE 5.4 L V8	50	(Brazil) Igor Omura Fraga	Y	All
R'Qs Motor Sports Anest Iwata Racing with Arnage	Lexus	Lexus RC F GT3	Lexus 2UR-GSE 5.4 L V8	50	(Japan) Yuga Furutani	Y	All
R'Qs Motor Sports Anest Iwata Racing with Arnage	Lexus	Lexus RC F GT3	Lexus 2UR-GSE 5.4 L V8	50	(Japan) Miki Koyama	Y	2–5, 7
Hoppy Team Tsuchiya	Toyota	Toyota GR Supra GT300	Toyota 2UR-GSE 5.4 L V8	25	(Japan) Togo Suganami	Y	1–4
Hoppy Team Tsuchiya	Toyota	Toyota GR Supra GT300	Toyota 2UR-GSE 5.4 L V8	25	(Japan) Seita Nonaka	Y	1–4
Max Racing	Toyota	Toyota GR Supra GT300	Toyota 2UR-GSE 5.4 L V8	244	(Japan) Kimiya Sato	Y	1–4
Max Racing	Toyota	Toyota GR Supra GT300	Toyota 2UR-GSE 5.4 L V8	244	(Japan) Atsushi Miyake	Y	1–4
apr	Toyota GR	Toyota GR86 GT300	Toyota 2UR-GSE 5.4 L V8	30	(Japan) Manabu Orido	Y	All
apr	Toyota GR	Toyota GR86 GT300	Toyota 2UR-GSE 5.4 L V8	30	(Japan) Yuta Kamimura	Y	1, 3, 5, 7
apr	Toyota GR	Toyota GR86 GT300	Toyota 2UR-GSE 5.4 L V8	30	(Japan) Hiroaki Nagai	Y	2–8
apr	Toyota GR	Toyota GR86 GT300	Toyota 2UR-GSE 5.4 L V8	30	(Japan) Ryo Ogawa	Y	2, 4
apr	Lexus	Lexus LC 500h GT300	Lexus 2UR-GSE 5.4 L Hybrid V8	31	(Japan) Kazuto Kotaka	B	All
apr	Lexus	Lexus LC 500h GT300	Lexus 2UR-GSE 5.4 L Hybrid V8	31	(Japan) Koki Saga	B	1–7
apr	Lexus	Lexus LC 500h GT300	Lexus 2UR-GSE 5.4 L Hybrid V8	31	(Japan) Yuki Nemoto	B	2–5, 7–8
NILZZ Racing	Nissan	Nissan GT-R Nismo GT3	Nissan VR38DETT 3.8 L Twin Turbo V6	48	(Japan) Taiyo Ida	Y	All
NILZZ Racing	Nissan	Nissan GT-R Nismo GT3	Nissan VR38DETT 3.8 L Twin Turbo V6	48	(Japan) Yuki Tanaka	Y	1, 6–8
NILZZ Racing	Nissan	Nissan GT-R Nismo GT3	Nissan VR38DETT 3.8 L Twin Turbo V6	48	(Japan) Takumi Sanada	Y	2–5, 7
NILZZ Racing	Nissan	Nissan GT-R Nismo GT3	Nissan VR38DETT 3.8 L Twin Turbo V6	48	(Japan) Masaya Kono	Y	2–3, 5
Saitama Toyopet GreenBrave	Toyota GR	Toyota GR Supra GT300	Toyota 2UR-GSE 5.4 L V8	52	(Japan) Hiroki Yoshida	B	All
Saitama Toyopet GreenBrave	Toyota GR	Toyota GR Supra GT300	Toyota 2UR-GSE 5.4 L V8	52	(Japan) Kohta Kawaai	B	All
Saitama Toyopet GreenBrave	Toyota GR	Toyota GR Supra GT300	Toyota 2UR-GSE 5.4 L V8	52	(Japan) Seita Nonaka	B	7
Kondo Racing	Nissan	Nissan GT-R Nismo GT3	Nissan VR38DETT 3.8 L Twin Turbo V6	56	(Brazil) João Paulo de Oliveira	Y	All
Kondo Racing	Nissan	Nissan GT-R Nismo GT3	Nissan VR38DETT 3.8 L Twin Turbo V6	56	(Japan) Teppei Natori	Y	All
LM corsa	Toyota GR	Toyota GR Supra GT300	Toyota 2UR-GSE 5.4 L V8	60	(Japan) Hiroki Yoshimoto	D	All
LM corsa	Toyota GR	Toyota GR Supra GT300	Toyota 2UR-GSE 5.4 L V8	60	(Japan) Shunsuke Kohno	D	All
R&D Sport	Subaru	Subaru BRZ GT300 (ZD8)	Subaru EJ20 2.0 L Turbo F4	61	(Japan) Takuto Iguchi	D	All
R&D Sport	Subaru	Subaru BRZ GT300 (ZD8)	Subaru EJ20 2.0 L Turbo F4	61	(Japan) Hideki Yamauchi	D	All
K2 R&D LEON Racing	Mercedes-AMG	Mercedes-AMG GT3 Evo	Mercedes-AMG M159 6.2 L V8	65	(Japan) Naoya Gamou	B	All
K2 R&D LEON Racing	Mercedes-AMG	Mercedes-AMG GT3 Evo	Mercedes-AMG M159 6.2 L V8	65	(Japan) Takuro Shinohara	B	All
K2 R&D LEON Racing	Mercedes-AMG	Mercedes-AMG GT3 Evo	Mercedes-AMG M159 6.2 L V8	65	(Japan) Haruki Kurosawa	B	5, 7
JLOC	Lamborghini	Lamborghini Huracán GT3 Evo	Lamborghini DGF 5.2 L V10	87	(Japan) Kosuke Matsuura	Y	All
JLOC	Lamborghini	Lamborghini Huracán GT3 Evo	Lamborghini DGF 5.2 L V10	87	(Japan) Natsu Sakaguchi	Y	All
JLOC	Lamborghini	Lamborghini Huracán GT3 Evo 3 Lamborghini Huracán GT3 Evo 2 5	Lamborghini DGF 5.2 L V10	88	(Japan) Takashi Kogure	Y	All
JLOC	Lamborghini	Lamborghini Huracán GT3 Evo 3 Lamborghini Huracán GT3 Evo 2 5	Lamborghini DGF 5.2 L V10	88	(Japan) Yuya Motojima	Y	All
K-tunes Racing	Lexus	Lexus RC F GT3	Lexus 2UR-GSE 5.4 L V8	96	(Japan) Morio Nitta	D	All
K-tunes Racing	Lexus	Lexus RC F GT3	Lexus 2UR-GSE 5.4 L V8	96	(Japan) Shinichi Takagi	D	All
Tomei Sports	Nissan	Nissan GT-R Nismo GT3	Nissan VR38DETT 3.8 L Twin Turbo V6	360	(Japan) Takayuki Aoki	Y	All
Tomei Sports	Nissan	Nissan GT-R Nismo GT3	Nissan VR38DETT 3.8 L Twin Turbo V6	360	(Japan) Atsushi Tanaka	Y	1–5, 7
Tomei Sports	Nissan	Nissan GT-R Nismo GT3	Nissan VR38DETT 3.8 L Twin Turbo V6	360	(Japan) Takuya Otaki	Y	2–7
Tomei Sports	Nissan	Nissan GT-R Nismo GT3	Nissan VR38DETT 3.8 L Twin Turbo V6	360	(Japan) Yusaku Shibata	Y	8

=== Vehicle changes ===
==== GT300 ====
- apr replaced their Toyota GR Sport Prius PHV with a new hybrid GT300 car, the Lexus LC500h GT. The Prius had served as apr's flagship car since 2012.
- After selling their Toyota 86 Mother Chassis to Team Mach in the off-season, Anest Iwata Racing with Arnage (see Entrant changes below) changed to the Lexus RC F GT3.
- Pacific Racing Team replaced their Ferrari 488 GT3 Evo with a Mercedes-AMG GT3 Evo.

=== Entrant changes ===
==== GT500 ====
- Toyota: Toyota Gazoo Racing announced their GT500 class driver line-ups on 25 November 2022.
  - TOM'S saw Sacha Fenestraz left the series to compete in Formula E with Nissan. TOM's drivers Ritomo Miyata and Giuliano Alesi exchanged cars, with Miyata going to the number 36 team and Alesi going to the number 37 with new sponsorship from Deloitte. Alesi would share the car with former Honda driver Ukyo Sasahara, who officially joined Toyota on 12 January 2023.
- Honda: Honda Racing announced their GT500 class driver line-ups on 12 December 2022.
  - Mugen Motorsports (M-TEC) and ARTA formed a strategic alliance, competing with two ARTA Mugen-branded cars under the ARTA entrant name. Toshiki Oyu moves over to the number 8 ARTA Mugen car to partner Tomoki Nojiri. In exchange, Nirei Fukuzumi moved to the number 16 car to partner Hiroki Otsu, who joined ARTA after three seasons at Nakajima Racing.
  - Kakunoshin Ohta who raced with Team UpGarage GT300 stepped up to take Otsu's place at Nakajima Racing, alongside Takuya Izawa.
- Nissan: Nissan announced their GT500 class driver line-ups on 27 January 2023.
  - Team Impul carried the GT500 champions number 1 plate. Kazuki Hoshino the son of team founder Kazuyoshi Hoshino, became the new Team Director. Four years after the merger between Impul's longtime title sponsor Calsonic and Magneti Marelli, the Marelli brand replaced Calsonic on the blue Impul Nissan Z, now entered as the "Marelli Impul Z".
  - NDDP Racing signed spark plug manufacturer Niterra as their new main sponsor, to replace specialty dealer CraftSports.

==== GT300 ====
- Team UpGarage recruited Reigning F4 Japan Champion Syun Koide following Ohta's promotion to the GT500 class.
- After forming a two-car GT500 programme with M-TEC, ARTA ceased their GT300 operation.
- 2016 GT300 champion Takamitsu Matsui transferred from Hoppy Team Tsuchiya to Team Mach, replacing Reiji Hiraki who switch to his HELM Motorsports in Super Taikyu ST-X class.
- 2013 GT300 champion Yuhki Nakayama left apr as he switch to Super Taikyu ST-X class with TKRI. Reigning Super Formula Lights champion Kazuto Kotaka replaced Nakayama in the number 31 apr team, with GT World Challenge Europe Endurance Cup driver Yuki Nemoto signed as the third driver for long-distance rounds. Yuta Kamimura and reigning Porsche Carrera Cup Japan champion Ryo Ogawa would share the role of third driver in the number 30 apr GR86 GT.
- Augusto Farfus left Team Studie as he switch to IMSA SportsCar GTP class. His replacement was another BMW factory driver and 2012 DTM champion Bruno Spengler. Two-time GT500 and GT300 champion Masataka Yanagida was signed to be the third driver and replaced Spengler in the event of calendar clashes. The entrant name was changed from BMW Team Studie x CSL (Customer Racing Support Limited) to BMW Team Studie x CRS (Customer Racing Support). From the fourth round onward the entrant name was changed again, to BMW M Team Studie x CRS.
- 2008 GT300 champion Hironobu Yasuda moved to the number 10 GAINER team to partner second-year driver Riki Okusa. In exchange, Ryuichiro Tomita moved to the number 11 car to partner Keishi Ishikawa. Yusuke Shiotsu, previously the third driver of the number 10 car, became the third driver of the number 11 car for long-distance rounds.
- After 8 years racing with Tsuchiya Engineering, Takamitsu Matsui left the team to Team Mach. Togo Suganami returned to the series after a year away after he competed in Super Formula Lights with B-Max Racing Team where he finished 7th in the standings.
- Equipment manufacturer Anest Iwata established a racing team, and partnered up with Arnage Racing to compete as "Anest Iwata Racing with Arnage". Ryohei Sakaguchi and Masaki Kano left the team for Pacific Racing Team and R&Q's Motor Sports respectively. The team signed multi-time Gran Turismo World Series champion and former FIA Formula 3 Championship driver Igor Fraga made his series debut after not racing for over two years, and 2021 Formula Regional Japanese Champion Yuga Furutani. 2022 Formula Regional Japanese Champion Miki Koyama was named the third driver and became the first woman to race in the series since Cyndie Allemann in 2012.
- Furniture retailer Yogibo having previously sponsored Drago Corse in 2021 season, returned to Super GT and competed as "Yogibo Racing". The team entered a Honda NSX GT3 and received technical support from Servus Japan, who previously supported ARTA. The team signed F4 Japanese Championship graduates Yugo Iwasawa and Reimei Ito after both finished 5th and 7th respectively.
- Two-time GT300 championship runner-up Hiroki Katoh was appointed as Inging's new team director and shifted to a part-time driving role as the team's third driver.Replacing Katoh would be 2020 FIA F4 Japan Champion Hibiki Taira as began his first full season in the series after previously served as the third driver for apr.
- Reigning GT300 champion Kiyoto Fujinami left Kondo Racing, 2021 Super Formula Lights champion Teppei Natori returned to the series with defending series champions after competed in Super Taikyu ST-Z with Team ZeroOne and a one off appearance with Tomei Sports last year. Kondo Racing declined the option to use the number 0 plate reserved for the reigning GT300 series champions and instead kept the number 56.
- Drago Corse, who dropped out of the 2022 season due to sponsorship issues, did not return to the series in 2023. Masataka Yanagida move to Studie as the third driver, and Yuji Ide left the series once again.
- Pacific Racing Team ended their collaboration with CarGuy Racing after the 2022 season. Pacific signed an all-new driver line up with former Arnage driver Ryohei Sakaguchi and China Endurance Championship driver Liang Jiatong. While race winner Shintaro Kawabata hired the third driver for the team.
- Seiya Jin, Shinnosuke Yamada, Masaki Kano, Takumi Sanada, and Takuya Otaki were announced as the third drivers of Team LeMans, SHADE Racing, R'Qs MotorSports, NILZZ Racing, and Tomei Sports respectively.

=== Mid-season changes ===
==== GT500 Class ====
- Iori Kimura was named as the third driver for the number 8 ARTA Mugen NSX-GT. Kimura's appointment came after Toshiki Oyu suffered a fractured collarbone prior to the Super Formula race at Fuji Speedway on 16 July. Oyu was eventually declared fit to race, so Kimura did not run in practice, qualifying, or the race.
- Naoki Yamamoto suffered a neck injury in a crash at Sportsland Sugo which forced him to miss the final two races of the season. Iori Kimura was named as his replacement.

==== GT300 Class ====
- Yuta Kamimura replaced Hiroaki Nagai in the number 30 apr Toyota GR86 for the opening round of the series. Nagai returned for round two, and Ryo Ogawa made his series debut as the team's third driver. Kamimura and Ogawa alternated third driver duties throughout the season, with Ogawa running both races at Fuji, and Kamimura running both races at Suzuka plus the Autopolis round.
- Pacific Racing Team missed the second round at Fuji after a crash at Okayama. They returned from the third round onwards.
- Masaya Kono replaced NILZZ Racing's Yuki Tanaka for rounds two and three. Tanaka withdrew prior to the fourth round at Fuji and was not replaced. Kono would join Taiyo Ida and Takumi Sanada for the fifth round at Suzuka, and Tanaka returned for the sixth round at Sugo.
- Roberto Merhi signed with Mahindra Racing in the FIA Formula E World Championship, replacing Oliver Rowland for the remainder of the 2023 season. Due to a clash of dates between the third round at Suzuka and the Jakarta ePrix, Merhi did not race at Suzuka.
- JLOC debuted the new Lamborghini Huracán GT3 EVO2 at the fourth round at Fuji Speedway. The number 88 team ran with a brand new EVO2 chassis, while the number 87 team would use the old number 88 GT3 EVO model following a heavy crash at Suzuka, which destroyed their previous chassis.
- Hoppy Team Tsuchiya's Toyota GR Supra GT300 was destroyed in a vehicle fire during the fourth round at Fuji Speedway, and the car and team would not return for the rest of the season.
- On 23 August, Max Racing announced their immediate withdrawal from the Super GT Series. They were scheduled to miss the fifth round at Suzuka due to a vehicle fire sustained in the previous round at Fuji.
- 2018 GT300 Champion and K2 R&D LEON Racing team director, Haruki Kurosawa, entered the fifth round at Suzuka as the team's third driver. It is Kurosawa's first Super GT appearance as a driver since the 2019 Fuji GT 500 Mile Race.
- Seita Nonaka joined Saitama Toyopet GreenBrave as a third driver for the seventh round at Autopolis.
- Yuki Nemoto replaced Koki Saga in the number 31 apr Lexus LC500h for the final round at Motegi.
- Time attack and gymkhana specialist Yusaku Shibata rejoined Tomei Sports for the final round at Motegi, driving alongside Takayuki Aoki.

== Results ==
Drivers credited with winning Pole Position for their respective teams are indicated in bold text.

Round	Circuit	Class	Pole position	Fastest lap	Race winner
1	Okayama International Circuit	GT500	No. 23 NISMO	No. 100 Team Kunimitsu	No. 23 NISMO
1	Okayama International Circuit	GT500	**(Japan) Tsugio Matsuda** (Italy) Ronnie Quintarelli	(Japan) Naoki Yamamoto (Japan) Tadasuke Makino	(Japan) Tsugio Matsuda (Italy) Ronnie Quintarelli
1	Okayama International Circuit	GT300	No. 65 K2 R&D LEON Racing	No. 65 K2 R&D LEON Racing	No. 18 Team UpGarage
1	Okayama International Circuit	GT300	(Japan) **Naoya Gamou** (Japan) Takuro Shinohara	(Japan) Naoya Gamou (Japan) Takuro Shinohara	(Japan) Takashi Kobayashi (Japan) Syun Koide
2	Fuji Speedway	GT500	No. 100 Team Kunimitsu	No. 100 Team Kunimitsu	No. 36 TGR Team au TOM'S
2	Fuji Speedway	GT500	(Japan) Naoki Yamamoto **(Japan) Tadasuke Makino**	(Japan) Naoki Yamamoto (Japan) Tadasuke Makino	(Japan) Sho Tsuboi (Japan) Ritomo Miyata
2	Fuji Speedway	GT300	No. 56 Kondo Racing	No. 88 JLOC	No. 56 Kondo Racing
2	Fuji Speedway	GT300	(Brazil) **João Paulo de Oliveira** (Japan) Teppei Natori	(Japan) Takashi Kogure (Japan) Yuya Motojima	(Brazil) João Paulo de Oliveira (Japan) Teppei Natori
3	Suzuka Circuit	GT500	No. 36 TGR Team au TOM'S	No. 36 TGR Team au TOM'S	No. 19 TGR Team WedsSport Bandoh
3	Suzuka Circuit	GT500	(Japan) **Sho Tsuboi** (Japan) Ritomo Miyata	(Japan) Sho Tsuboi (Japan) Ritomo Miyata	(Japan) Yuji Kunimoto (Japan) Sena Sakaguchi
3	Suzuka Circuit	GT300	No. 61 R&D Sport	No. 61 R&D Sport	No. 7 BMW M Team Studie × CRS
3	Suzuka Circuit	GT300	(Japan) Takuto Iguchi (Japan) **Hideki Yamauchi**	(Japan) Takuto Iguchi (Japan) Hideki Yamauchi	(Japan) Seiji Ara (Japan) Masataka Yanagida
4	Fuji Speedway	GT500	No. 24 Kondo Racing	No. 17 Astemo Real Racing	No. 3 NDDP Racing
4	Fuji Speedway	GT500	(Japan) **Daiki Sasaki** (Japan) Kohei Hirate	(Japan) Nobuharu Matsushita (Japan) Koudai Tsukakoshi	(Japan) Katsumasa Chiyo (Japan) Mitsunori Takaboshi
4	Fuji Speedway	GT300	No. 4 Goodsmile Racing & Team UKYO	No. 11 GAINER	No. 11 GAINER
4	Fuji Speedway	GT300	(Japan) **Nobuteru Taniguchi** (Japan) Tatsuya Kataoka	(Japan) Ryuichiro Tomita (Japan) Keishi Ishikawa (Japan) Yusuke Shiotsu	(Japan) Ryuichiro Tomita (Japan) Keishi Ishikawa (Japan) Yusuke Shiotsu (Note: Yusuke Shiotsu did not run during the race as a third driver and was ineligible for championship points.)
5	Suzuka Circuit	GT500	No. 16 ARTA	No. 16 ARTA	No. 16 ARTA
5	Suzuka Circuit	GT500	(Japan) **Nirei Fukuzumi** (Japan) Hiroki Otsu	(Japan) Nirei Fukuzumi (Japan) Hiroki Otsu	(Japan) Nirei Fukuzumi (Japan) Hiroki Otsu
5	Suzuka Circuit	GT300	No. 61 R&D Sport	No. 96 K-tunes Racing	No. 18 Team UpGarage
5	Suzuka Circuit	GT300	(Japan) Takuto Iguchi (Japan) **Hideki Yamauchi**	(Japan) Morio Nitta (Japan) Shinichi Takagi	(Japan) Takashi Kobayashi (Japan) Syun Koide
6	Sportsland Sugo	GT500	No. 8 ARTA	No. 8 ARTA	No. 8 ARTA
6	Sportsland Sugo	GT500	(Japan) Tomoki Nojiri (Japan) **Toshiki Oyu**	(Japan) Tomoki Nojiri (Japan) Toshiki Oyu	(Japan) Tomoki Nojiri (Japan) Toshiki Oyu
6	Sportsland Sugo	GT300	No. 96 K-tunes Racing	No. 96 K-tunes Racing	No. 52 Saitama Toyopet GreenBrave
6	Sportsland Sugo	GT300	(Japan) Morio Nitta (Japan) **Shinichi Takagi**	(Japan) Morio Nitta (Japan) Shinichi Takagi	(Japan) Hiroki Yoshida (Japan) Kohta Kawaai
7	Autopolis	GT500	No. 16 ARTA	No. 16 ARTA	No. 36 TGR Team au TOM'S
7	Autopolis	GT500	(Japan) **Nirei Fukuzumi** (Japan) Hiroki Otsu	(Japan) Nirei Fukuzumi (Japan) Hiroki Otsu	(Japan) Sho Tsuboi (Japan) Ritomo Miyata
7	Autopolis	GT300	No. 2 muta Racing INGING	No. 2 muta Racing INGING	No. 52 Saitama Toyopet GreenBrave
7	Autopolis	GT300	(Japan) **Yuui Tsutsumi** (Japan) Hibiki Taira (Japan) Hiroki Katoh	(Japan) Yuui Tsutsumi (Japan) Hibiki Taira (Japan) Hiroki Katoh	(Japan) Hiroki Yoshida (Japan) Kohta Kawaai (Japan) Seita Nonaka
8	Mobility Resort Motegi	GT500	No. 3 NDDP Racing	No. 3 NDDP Racing	No. 36 TGR Team au TOM'S
8	Mobility Resort Motegi	GT500	(Japan) **Katsumasa Chiyo** (Japan) Mitsunori Takaboshi	(Japan) Katsumasa Chiyo (Japan) Mitsunori Takaboshi	(Japan) Sho Tsuboi (Japan) Ritomo Miyata
8	Mobility Resort Motegi	GT300	No. 2 muta Racing INGING	No. 2 muta Racing INGING	No. 88 JLOC
8	Mobility Resort Motegi	GT300	(Japan) **Yuui Tsutsumi** (Japan) Hibiki Taira	(Japan) Yuui Tsutsumi (Japan) Hibiki Taira	(Japan) Takashi Kogure (Japan) Yuya Motojima

== Championship standings ==
=== Drivers' championships ===
Scoring system

Position	1st	2nd	3rd	4th	5th	6th	7th	8th	9th	10th	Pole
Points	20	15	11	8	6	5	4	3	2	1	1

==== GT500 ====
Rank	Driver	Team	OKA	FUJ1	SUZ1	FUJ2	SUZ2	SUG	AUT	MOT	Points
1	(Japan) Sho Tsuboi (Japan) Ritomo Miyata	No. 36 TGR Team au TOM'S	15	1	**2**	4	10	7	1	1	89
2	(Japan) Katsumasa Chiyo (Japan) Mitsunori Takaboshi	No. 3 NDDP Racing	2	5	4	1	12	9	3	**13**	63
3	(Japan) Tsugio Matsuda (Italy) Ronnie Quintarelli	No. 23 NISMO	**1**	7	13	13	DSQ	2	10	2	56
4	(Japan) Nirei Fukuzumi (Japan) Hiroki Otsu	No. 16 ARTA	11	10	7	3	**1**	12	**2**	12	53
5	(Japan) Kazuki Hiramine (Belgium) Bertrand Baguette	No. 1 Team Impul	6	9	3	15	5	4	5	4	46
6	(Japan) Koudai Tsukakoshi (Japan) Nobuharu Matsushita	No. 17 Astemo REAL Racing	7	3	9	7	4	DSQ	6	3	45
7	(Japan) Kazuya Oshima (Japan) Kenta Yamashita	No. 14 TGR Team ENEOS ROOKIE	4	4	6	11	3	6	8	6	45
8	(Japan) Tomoki Nojiri (Japan) Toshiki Oyu	No. 8 ARTA	3	11	12	14	14	**1**	Ret	5	38
9	(Japan) Yuhi Sekiguchi (Japan) Yuichi Nakayama	No. 39 TGR Team SARD	8	8	15	9	2	3	14	7	38
10	(Japan) Tadasuke Makino	No. 100 Team Kunimitsu	12	**2**	5	6	7	Ret	9	10	34
11	(Japan) Naoki Yamamoto	No. 100 Team Kunimitsu	12	**2**	5	6	7	Ret			31
12	(Japan) Yuji Kunimoto (Japan) Sena Sakaguchi	No. 19 TGR Team WedsSport Bandoh	9	12	1	12	9	8	13	8	30
13	(Japan) Yuji Tachikawa (Japan) Hiroaki Ishiura	No. 38 TGR Team ZENT Cerumo	5	13	10	5	6	Ret	4	11	26
14	(Japan) Takuya Izawa (Japan) Kakunoshin Ohta	No. 64 Modulo Nakajima Racing	10	14	14	2	8	11	11	Ret	19
15	(Japan) Ukyo Sasahara (France) Giuliano Alesi	No. 37 TGR Team Deloitte TOM'S	13	6	11	8	11	10	7	9	15
16	(Japan) Daiki Sasaki (Japan) Kohei Hirate	No. 24 Kondo Racing	14	15	8	**10**	13	5	12	14	11
17	(Japan) Iori Kimura	No. 8 ARTA				14					3
17	(Japan) Iori Kimura	No. 100 Team Kunimitsu							9	10	3
Rank	Driver	Team	OKA	FUJ1	SUZ1	FUJ2	SUZ2	SUG	AUT	MOT	Points

Colour	Result
Gold	Winner
Silver	Second place
Bronze	Third place
Green	Points classification
Blue	Non-points classification
Blue	Non-classified finish (NC)
Purple	Retired, not classified (Ret)
Red	Did not qualify (DNQ)
Red	Did not pre-qualify (DNPQ)
Black	Disqualified (DSQ)
White	Did not start (DNS)
White	Withdrew (WD)
White	Race cancelled (C)
Blank	Did not practice (DNP)
Blank	Did not arrive (DNA)
Blank	Excluded (EX)

**Bold** – Pole
Italics – Fastest Lap
† — Did not finish but classified

==== GT300 ====
Rank	Driver	Team	OKA	FUJ1	SUZ1	FUJ2	SUZ2	SUG	AUT	MOT	Points
1	(Japan) Hiroki Yoshida (Japan) Kohta Kawaai	No. 52 Saitama Toyopet GreenBrave	5	3	3	9	Ret	1	1	7	74
2	(Japan) Yuui Tsutsumi (Japan) Hibiki Taira	No. 2 muta Racing INGING	18	2	2	11	7	Ret	**2**	**9**	53
3	(Brazil) João Paulo de Oliveira (Japan) Teppei Natori	No. 56 Kondo Racing	10	**1**	4	4	Ret	10	5	6	50
4	(Japan) Naoya Gamou (Japan) Takuro Shinohara	No. 65 K2 R&D LEON Racing	**2**	4	12	25†	Ret	6	12	2	44
5	(Japan) Takashi Kobayashi (Japan) Syun Koide	No. 18 Team UpGarage	1	Ret	Ret	17	1	DSQ	17	8	43
6	(Japan) Seiji Ara	No. 7 BMW M Team Studie × CRS	6	13	1	2	16	13	8	12	43
7	(Japan) Takashi Kogure (Japan) Yuya Motojima	No. 88 JLOC	24†	6	21	8	4	14	7	1	40
8	(Japan) Takuto Iguchi (Japan) Hideki Yamauchi	No. 61 R&D Sport	22	11	**6**	6	**3**	4	4	10	40
9	(Japan) Yoshiaki Katayama	No. 6 Team LeMans	21	7	15	3	Ret	3	15	3	37
9	(Spain) Roberto Merhi Muntan	No. 6 Team LeMans	21	7		3	Ret	3	15	3	37
10	(Japan) Masataka Yanagida	No. 7 BMW M Team Studie × CRS		13	1	2					35
11	(Japan) Kazuto Kotaka	No. 31 apr	16	8	13	5	6	11	3	4	33
11	(Japan) Yuki Nemoto	No. 31 apr		8	13	5	6		3	4	33
12	(Japan) Ryuichiro Tomita (Japan) Keishi Ishikawa	No. 11 GAINER	Ret	17	5	1	15	12	9	13	28
13	(Japan) Koki Saga	No. 31 apr	16	8	13	5	6	11	3		25
14	(Japan) Nobuteru Taniguchi (Japan) Tatsuya Kataoka	No. 4 Goodsmile Racing & Team UKYO	9	Ret	18	**12**	5	5	6	11	20
15	(Japan) Kosuke Matsuura (Japan) Natsu Sakaguchi	No. 87 JLOC	7	Ret	23	16	2	19	19	21	19
16	(Japan) Katsuyuki Hiranaka (Japan) Eijiro Shimizu	No. 20 SHADE Racing	Ret	12	10	15	18	2	13	14	16
17	(Japan) Hironobu Yasuda (Japan) Riki Okusa	No. 10 GAINER	11	5	8	7	13	9	10	16	16
18	(Japan) Morio Nitta (Japan) Shinichi Takagi	No. 96 K-tunes Racing	14	9	22	23	8	**8**	Ret	5	15
19	(Japan) Kimiya Sato (Japan) Atsushi Miyake	No. 244 Max Racing	3	16	16	Ret					11
20	(Japan) Yugo Iwasawa (Japan) Reimei Ito	No. 27 Yogibo Racing	4	15	20	20	9	18	Ret	Ret	10
21	(Canada) Bruno Spengler	No. 7 BMW M Team Studie × CRS	6				16	13	8	12	8
22	(Japan) Hiroki Yoshimoto (Japan) Shunsuke Kohno	No. 60 LM corsa	8	23†	7	10	12	21	20	15	8
23	(Brazil) Igor Omura Fraga (Japan) Yuga Furutani	No. 50 Anest Iwata Racing with Arnage	12	14	17	19	10	7	11	17	5
24	(Japan) Manabu Orido	No. 30 apr	13	18	9	13	17	Ret	16	23	2
24	(Japan) Hiroaki Nagai	No. 30 apr		18	9	13	17	Ret	16	23	2
24	(Japan) Yuta Kamimura	No. 30 apr	13		9		17		16		2
25	(Japan) Seita Nonaka	No. 25 Hoppy Team Tsuchiya	17	10	11	Ret					1
25	(Japan) Seita Nonaka	No. 52 Saitama Toyopet GreenBrave							1 (Note: Seita Nonaka, Hiroki Katoh, Yusuke Shiotsu did not run during the race as a third driver and were ineligible for championship points.)		1
25	(Japan) Togo Suganami	No. 25 Hoppy Team Tsuchiya	17	10	11	Ret					1
26	(Japan) Hiroki Katoh	No. 2 muta Racing INGING		2 (Note: Hiroki Katoh & Seiya Jin did not run during the race as a third driver and were ineligible for championship points.)	2 (Note: Hiroki Katoh, Yusuke Shiotsu, & Shinosuke Yamada did not run during the race as a third driver and were ineligible for championship points.)	11	7 (Note: Hiroki Katoh, Miki Koyama did not run during the race as a third driver and were ineligible for championship points.)		**2**		1
–	(Japan) Yusuke Shiotsu	No. 11 GAINER		17	5	1 (Note: Yusuke Shiotsu and Seiya Jin did not run during the race as a third driver and were ineligible for championship points.)	15		9		0
–	(Japan) Seiya Jin	No. 6 Team LeMans		7	15	3	Ret		15		0
–	(Japan) Miki Koyama	No. 50 Anest Iwata Racing with Arnage		14	17	19	10		11		0
–	(Japan) Shinnosuke Yamada	No. 20 SHADE Racing		12	10	15	18		13		0
–	(Japan) Ryohei Sakaguchi (China) Liang Jiatong	No. 9 Pacific Racing Team	23†	WD	25	22	11	17	23	19	0
–	(Japan) Shintaro Kawabata	No. 9 Pacific Racing Team		WD	25	22	11		23		0
–	(Japan) Haruki Kurosawa	No. 65 K2 R&D LEON Racing					Ret		12		0
–	(Japan) Ryo Ogawa	No. 30 apr		18		13					0
–	(Japan) Takayuki Aoki	No. 360 Tomei Sports	Ret	19	14	14	14	15	14	24	0
–	(Japan) Takuya Otaki	No. 360 Tomei Sports		19	14	14	14	15	14		0
–	(Japan) Atsushi Tanaka	No. 360 Tomei Sports	Ret	19	14	14	14		14		0
–	(Japan) Yusuke Tomibayashi (Japan) Takamitsu Matsui	No. 5 Team Mach	15	22	19	18	21	22	18	18	0
–	(Japan) Hisashi Wada (Japan) Masaki Jyonai	No. 22 R'Qs Motor Sports	20	21	26	24	20	16	21	22	0
–	(Japan) Taiyo Ida	No. 48 NILZZ Racing	19	20	25	21	19	20	22	20	0
–	(Japan) Takumi Sanada	No. 48 NILZZ Racing		20	25	21	19		22		0
–	(Japan) Yuki Tanaka	No. 48 NILZZ Racing	19			WD		20	22	20	0
–	(Japan) Masaya Kono	No. 48 NILZZ Racing		20	25		19				0
–	(Japan) Masaki Kano	No. 22 R'Qs Motor Sports		21	26	24	20		21		0
–	(Japan) Yusaku Shibata	No. 360 Tomei Sports								24	0
Rank	Driver	Team	OKA	FUJ1	SUZ1	FUJ2	SUZ2	SUG	AUT	MOT	Points

=== Teams' championships ===
Race points

Position	1st	2nd	3rd	4th	5th	6th	7th	8th	9th	10th
Points	20	15	11	8	6	5	4	3	2	1

Additionally, teams received points for completed the race behind the race winner:

	**Same lap as the race winner**	**1 lap behind the race winner**	**2 laps or more behind the race winner**
Points	3	2	1

==== GT500 ====
Rank	Team	OKA	FUJ1	SUZ1	FUJ2	SUZ2	SUG	AUT	MOT	Points
1	No. 36 TGR Team au TOM'S	15^{3}	1^{1}	2^{1}	4^{1}	10^{1}	7^{2}	1^{1}	1^{1}	109
2	No. 3 NDDP Racing	2^{1}	5^{1}	4^{1}	1^{1}	12^{3}	9^{1}	3^{1}	13^{1}	85
3	No. 23 NISMO	1^{1}	7^{1}	13^{2}	13^{2}	DSQ	2^{1}	10^{1}	2^{1}	74
4	No. 16 ARTA	11^{1}	10^{1}	7^{1}	3^{1}	1^{1}	12^{3}	2^{1}	12^{1}	73
5	No. 1 Team Impul	6^{1}	9^{1}	3^{1}	15^{2}	5^{1}	4^{1}	5^{1}	4^{1}	69
6	No. 14 TGR Team Eneos ROOKIE	4^{1}	4^{1}	6^{1}	11^{2}	3^{1}	6^{2}	8^{1}	6 ^{1}	67
7	No. 17 Astemo Real Racing	7^{1}	3^{1}	9^{1}	7^{2}	4^{1}	DSQ	6^{1}	3 ^{1}	65
8	No. 39 TGR Team SARD	8^{1}	8^{1}	15^{2}	9^{2}	2^{1}	3^{1}	14^{3}	7^{1}	58
9	No. 8 ARTA	3^{1}	11^{2}	12^{1}	14^{2}	14^{3}	1^{1}	Ret	5^{1}	54
10	No. 100 Team Kunimitsu	12^{2}	2^{1}	5^{1}	6^{1}	7^{1}	Ret	9^{1}	10^{1}	53
11	No. 19 TGR Team WedsSport Bandoh	9^{1}	12^{2}	1^{1}	12^{2}	9^{1}	8^{2}	13^{3}	8^{1}	49
12	No. 38 TGR Team ZENT Cerumo	5^{1}	13^{2}	10^{1}	5^{1}	6^{1}	Ret	4^{1}	11^{1}	46
13	No. 64 Modulo Nakajima Racing	10^{1}	14^{2}	14^{2}	2^{1}	8^{1}	11^{1}	11^{1}	Ret	37
14	No. 37 TGR Team Deloitte TOM'S	13^{2}	6^{1}	11^{1}	8^{2}	11^{1}	10^{2}	7^{1}	9^{1}	36
15	No. 24 Kondo Racing	14 ^{3}	15^{3}	8^{1}	10^{2}	13^{2}	5^{1}	12^{3}	14^{2}	25
Rank	Team	OKA	FUJ1	SUZ1	FUJ2	SUZ2	SUG	AUT	MOT	Points

1 – 3 Points for finished at the same lap as the race winner
2 – 2 Points for finished 1 lap behind the race winner
3 – 1 Point for finished 2 laps or more behind the race winner

==== GT300 ====
Rank	Team	OKA	FUJ1	SUZ1	FUJ2	SUZ2	SUG	AUT	MOT	Points
1	No. 52 Saitama Toyopet GreenBrave	5^{1}	3^{1}	3^{1}	9^{1}	Ret	1^{1}	1^{1}	7^{1}	95
2	No. 2 muta Racing INGING	18^{2}	2^{1}	2^{1}	11^{1}	7^{1}	Ret	2^{1}	9^{1}	71
3	No. 56 Kondo Racing	10^{1}	1^{1}	4^{1}	4^{1}	Ret	10^{1}	5^{1}	6^{1}	70
4	No. 7 BMW M Team Studie × CRS	6^{1}	13^{2}	1^{1}	2^{1}	16^{1}	13^{2}	8^{2}	12^{1}	64
5	No. 88 JLOC	24†^{3}	6^{1}	21^{1}	8^{1}	4^{1}	14^{2}	7^{1}	1	61
6	No. 65 K2 R&D LEON Racing	2^{1}	4^{1}	12^{1}	25†^{3}	Ret	6^{1}	12^{2}	2^{1}	61
7	No. 61 R&D Sport	22^{3}	11^{2}	6^{1}	6^{1}	3^{1}	4	4^{1}	10^{1}	59
8	No. 31 apr	16^{1}	8^{1}	13^{1}	5^{1}	6^{1}	11	3^{1}	4^{1}	57
9	No. 18 Team UpGarage	1^{1}	Ret	Ret	17^{1}	1^{1}	DSQ	17^{1}	8^{1}	56
10	No. 6 Team LeMans	21^{3}	7^{1}	15^{1}	3^{1}	Ret	3^{1}	15^{2}	3^{1}	55
11	No. 11 GAINER	Ret	17^{2}	5^{1}	1^{1}	15^{1}	12^{2}	9^{2}	13^{1}	46
12	No. 4 Goodsmile Racing & Team UKYO	9^{1}	Ret	18^{1}	12^{1}	5^{1}	5^{1}	6^{1}	11^{1}	40
13	No. 10 GAINER	11^{1}	5^{1}	8^{1}	7^{1}	13^{1}	9^{1}	10^{1}	16^{1}	39
14	No. 87 JLOC	7^{1}	Ret	23^{1}	16^{1}	2^{1}	19^{2}	19^{3}	21^{3}	35
15	No. 20 SHADE Racing	Ret	12^{2}	10^{1}	15^{1}	18^{2}	2^{1}	13^{2}	14^{1}	34
16	No. 96 K-tunes Racing	14^{2}	9^{1}	22^{1}	23^{3}	8^{1}	8^{1}	Ret	5^{1}	33
17	No. 50 Anest Iwata Racing with Arnage	12^{1}	14^{2}	17^{1}	19^{1}	10^{1}	7^{2}	11^{2}	17^{1}	27
18	No. 60 LM Corsa	8^{1}	23†^{3}	7^{1}	10^{1}	12^{1}	21^{3}	20^{3}	15^{1}	26
19	No. 27 Yogibo Racing	4^{1}	15^{2}	20^{1}	20^{2}	9^{1}	18^{2}	Ret	Ret	25
20	No. 244 Max Racing	3^{1}	16^{2}	16^{1}	Ret					19
21	No. 30 apr	13^{1}	18^{3}	9^{1}	13^{1}	17^{1}	Ret	16^{2}	23^{3}	18
22	No. 5 Team Mach	15^{1}	22^{3}	19^{1}	18^{1}	21^{3}	22^{3}	18^{3}	18^{1}	16
23	No. 360 Tomei Sports	Ret	19^{3}	14^{3}	14^{3}	14^{3}	15^{2}	14^{2}	24^{1}	15
24	No. 9 Pacific Racing Team	23†^{3}	WD	25^{1}	22^{2}	11^{1}	17^{2}	23^{3}	19^{2}	14
25	No. 48 NILZZ Racing	19^{2}	20^{3}	25^{1}	21^{2}	19^{2}	20^{3}	22^{3}	20^{3}	13
26	No. 22 R'Qs Motor Sports	20 ^{2}	21^{3}	26^{2}	24^{3}	20^{3}	16^{2}	21^{3}	22^{3}	11
27	No. 25 Hoppy Team Tsuchiya	17^{1}	10^{1}	11^{1}	Ret					10
Rank	Team	OKA	FUJ1	SUZ1	FUJ2	SUZ2	SUG	AUT	MOT	Points
