= 2016–17 MRF Challenge Formula 2000 Championship =

Auto racing championship of India

The 2016–17 MRF Challenge Formula 2000 Championship was the fifth running of the MRF Challenge Formula 2000 Championship. It began on 18 November 2016 at the Bahrain International Circuit in Sakhir, Bahrain and ended on 19 February 2017 at the Madras Motor Racing Track in Chennai, India. The series comprised 16 races spread across four meetings, with the first round in Bahrain being a support event to the FIA World Endurance Championship.

== Drivers ==
Drivers whose name appears in italics are ineligible to score points in the championship.

No.	Driver	Rounds
1	(India) Narain Karthikeyan	3–4
2	(Netherlands) Rinus van Kalmthout	1–3
3	(Australia) Dylan Young	All
4	(United Kingdom) Harrison Newey	All
5	(France) Christophe Mariot	1
7	(India) Parth Ghorpade	2
8	(Malaysia) Chia Wing Hoong	3–4
9	(United Kingdom) Dan Ticktum	4
11	(Brazil) Felipe Drugovich	All
12	(United States) Neil Verhagen	4
13	(United States) Bobby Eberle	1–2
25	(Germany) Mick Schumacher	All
27	(Germany) Kim-Luis Schramm	1–3
28	(Singapore) Pavan Ravishankar	All
32	(Indonesia) Presley Martono	4
43	(Brazil) Pedro Cardoso	1–3
44	(Estonia) Jüri Vips	All
51	(United Kingdom) Toby Sowery	1–2, 4
78	(Japan) Yoshiaki Katayama	All
83	(Venezuela) Manuel Maldonado	All
93	(Australia) Zane Goddard	2
96	(Australia) Joey Mawson	All
97	(Brazil) Bruna Tomaselli	1
99	(Estonia) Ralf Aron	1, 3–4

== Calendar and results ==
Round		Circuit	Date	Pole position	Fastest lap	Winning driver
2016
1	R1	Bahrain International Circuit, Sakhir	18 November	(United Kingdom) Harrison Newey	(United Kingdom) Harrison Newey	(United Kingdom) Harrison Newey
1	R2	Bahrain International Circuit, Sakhir	18 November		(Estonia) Ralf Aron	(Germany) Mick Schumacher
1	R3	Bahrain International Circuit, Sakhir	19 November	(United Kingdom) Harrison Newey	(Estonia) Ralf Aron	(Estonia) Ralf Aron
1	R4	Bahrain International Circuit, Sakhir	19 November		(Australia) Joey Mawson	(Germany) Mick Schumacher
2	R1	(United Arab Emirates) Dubai Autodrome, Dubai	9 December	(Australia) Joey Mawson	(United Kingdom) Harrison Newey	(United Kingdom) Harrison Newey
2	R2	(United Arab Emirates) Dubai Autodrome, Dubai	9 December		(Australia) Joey Mawson	(Brazil) Felipe Drugovich
2	R3	(United Arab Emirates) Dubai Autodrome, Dubai	10 December	(United Kingdom) Harrison Newey	(Brazil) Pedro Cardoso (Note: Actual fastest lap achieved by guest driver Toby Sowery.)	(United Kingdom) Harrison Newey
2	R4	(United Arab Emirates) Dubai Autodrome, Dubai	10 December		(Japan) Yoshiaki Katayama	(Australia) Joey Mawson
2017
3	R1	(India) Buddh International Circuit, Greater Noida	28 January	(Germany) Mick Schumacher (Note: Actual pole position achieved by guest driver Narain Karthikeyan.)	(Germany) Mick Schumacher (Note: Actual fastest lap achieved by guest driver Narain Karthikeyan.)	(Germany) Mick Schumacher
3	R2	(India) Buddh International Circuit, Greater Noida	28 January		(Estonia) Ralf Aron	(Australia) Joey Mawson
3	R3	(India) Buddh International Circuit, Greater Noida	29 January	(Germany) Mick Schumacher	(United Kingdom) Harrison Newey	(Germany) Mick Schumacher
3	R4	(India) Buddh International Circuit, Greater Noida	29 January		(United Kingdom) Harrison Newey	(United Kingdom) Harrison Newey
4	R1	(India) Madras Motor Racing Track, Chennai	18 February	(United Kingdom) Harrison Newey	(Australia) Joey Mawson	(United Kingdom) Harrison Newey
4	R2	(India) Madras Motor Racing Track, Chennai	18 February		(Australia) Joey Mawson	(Australia) Joey Mawson
4	R3	(India) Madras Motor Racing Track, Chennai	19 February	(United Kingdom) Harrison Newey	(United Kingdom) Harrison Newey	(United Kingdom) Harrison Newey
4	R4	(India) Madras Motor Racing Track, Chennai	19 February		(United Kingdom) Harrison Newey	(United Kingdom) Harrison Newey

== Championship standings ==
=== Scoring system ===
Position	1st	2nd	3rd	4th	5th	6th	7th	8th	9th	10th	R1 PP	FL
Points	25	18	15	12	10	8	6	4	2	1	2	2

Drivers' standings

Pos.	Driver	BHR (Bahrain)				DUB (United Arab Emirates)				GNO (India)				CHE (India)				Points
1	(United Kingdom) Harrison Newey	**1**	4	**Ret**	4	1	6	**1**	Ret	3	4	3	1	**1**	4	**1**	1	277
2	(Australia) Joey Mawson	3	2	2	6	**2**	2	3	1	4	1	2	3	5	1	4	3	277
3	(Germany) Mick Schumacher	5	1	3	1	3	4	Ret	Ret	**1**	3	**1**	Ret	2	7	Ret	2	213
4	(Brazil) Felipe Drugovich	6	5	4	8	5	1	2	2	2	Ret	4	Ret	7	6	5	5	169
5	(Estonia) Ralf Aron	2	3	1	5					7	2	8	2	3	2	3	Ret	168
6	(Estonia) Jüri Vips	4	Ret	5	2	6	3	Ret	4	Ret	DNS	6	Ret	4	5	2	4	135
7	(Brazil) Pedro Cardoso	7	Ret	6	3	4	5	4	DNS	12	7	7	4					89
8	(Germany) Kim-Luis Schramm	8	6	7	7	7	7	11	6	6	9	10	5					65
9	(Australia) Dylan Young	9	7	8	9	8	10	6	5	DNS	Ret	9	7	12	9	6	7	61
10	(Netherlands) Rinus van Kalmthout	Ret	Ret	13	16	9	8	5	8	5	5	5	6					58
11	(Japan) Yoshiaki Katayama	10	12	9	10	16	12	10	7	8	7	11	10	11	12	8	9	32
12	(United Kingdom) Dan Ticktum													6	3	10	6	32
13	(Australia) Zane Goddard					13	9	8	3									21
14	(Venezuela) Manuel Maldonado	12	9	Ret	12	10	11	Ret	9	9	8	12	8	9	Ret	9	10	20
15	(United States) Neil Verhagen													10	8	7	Ret	11
16	(Indonesia) Presley Martono													8	10	11	8	9
17	(India) Parth Ghorpade					12	13	7	Ret									6
18	(Singapore) Pavan Ravishankar	14	10	11	17	14	15	9	Ret	10	Ret	13	9	13	11	14	11	6
19	(Brazil) Bruna Tomaselli	11	8	10	11													5
20	(United States) Bobby Eberle	13	11	16	13	15	16	12	10									1
21	(Malaysia) Chia Wing Hoong									11	10	DNS	Ret	14	13	13	12	1
22	(France) Christophe Mariot	15	13	12	15													0
Guest drivers ineligible for points
	(United Kingdom) Toby Sowery	16	16	14	14	11	14	Ret	11						14	12		0
	(India) Narain Karthikeyan									13	DNS	14	Ret		Ret			0
Pos.	Driver	BHR (Bahrain)				DUB (United Arab Emirates)				GNO (India)				CHE (India)				Points

Colour	Result
Gold	Winner
Silver	Second place
Bronze	Third place
Green	Points classification
Blue	Non-points classification
Blue	Non-classified finish (NC)
Purple	Retired, not classified (Ret)
Red	Did not qualify (DNQ)
Red	Did not pre-qualify (DNPQ)
Black	Disqualified (DSQ)
White	Did not start (DNS)
White	Withdrew (WD)
White	Race cancelled (C)
Blank	Did not practice (DNP)
Blank	Did not arrive (DNA)
Blank	Excluded (EX)

**Bold** – Pole
Italics – Fastest Lap
