= Yoshiaki Katayama =

Japanese racing driver (born 1993)

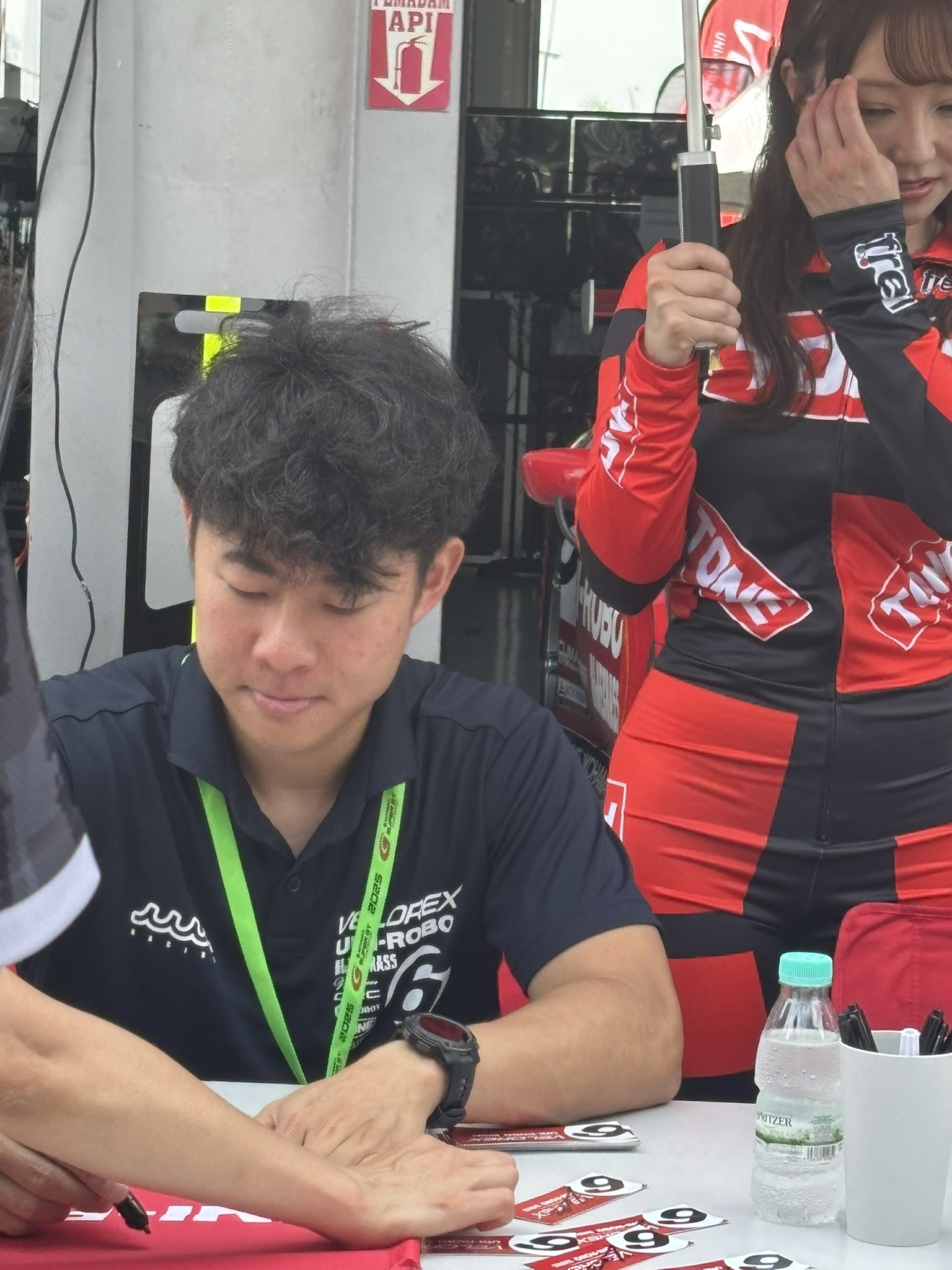
- Katayama at the 2025 Super GT Malaysia Festival
- Nationality: (Japan) Japanese
- Born: 13 November 1993 (age 32) Aichi Prefecture, Japan

Super GT - GT300 career
- Debut season: 2021
- Current team: Velorex
- Car number: 6
- Starts: 32
- Wins: 0
- Podiums: 4
- Poles: 1
- Best finish: 9th in 2023

Previous series
- 2021–22 2021 2020 2017–19 2016–17 2016 2015: Formula Regional Japanese Championship; S5000 Tasman Series; Super Formula Lights; Japanese Formula 3 Championship; MRF Challenge; Japanese Formula 3 Championship - National Class; F4 Japanese Championship

Championship titles
- 2016: Japanese Formula 3 Championship - National Class

Yoshiaki Katayama (born 13 November 1993 in the Aichi prefecture, Chūbu Region) is a Japanese racing driver currently competing in Super GT in the GT300 class. He is the 2016 Japanese Formula 3 - National Class champion.

== Career ==
=== Lower formulae ===
In 2015 Katayama made his debut in singe-seater racing by competing in the F4 Japanese Championship for miNami aoYama with SARD.

Katayama later competed in the 2016–17 MRF Challenge Formula 2000 Championship, where he came eleventh in the drivers' standings.

=== Formula 3 ===
In 2016, Katayama competed in the National class of the Japanese Formula 3 Championship with Petit Lemans Racing. He took nine National class wins on his way to become champion.

In 2017, Katayama returned to the Japanese Formula 3 Championship with the OKAYAMA KOKUSAI CIRCUIT RC. This time, he would compete for the overall championship. He finished the season in ninth.

In 2018, Katayama remained in the Japanese Formula 3 Championship with OIRC team YTB. He finished the season in seventh. At the end of the year, he joined Carlin Motorsport to compete in the 2018 Macau Grand Prix. He finished the main race in seventeenth after having started from twenty seventh due to an accident in the qualifying race.

In 2019, Katayama once again remained in the Japanese Formula 3 Championship with OIRC team YTB which was operated by Carlin Motorsport. In the third round at the Okayama International Circuit he took his first overall race win in the championship. Like the previous year, he finished the season in seventh.

In 2020, Katayama competed in the Formula 3-spec Super Formula Lights series with B-Max Racing as the Japanese Formula 3 Championship had been discontinued. After only competing in two rounds he finished the season in sixth.

In 2021, Katayama joined the Formula Regional Japanese Championship as a Privateer. He only competed in the opening round at the Okayama International Circuit where he won all three races.

In 2022, Katayama returned to the Formula Regional Japanese Championship. This time he competed for Team LeMans with OIRC. He took his only win of the season at the Okayama International Circuit and finished third in the drivers' standings after not taking part in the final round of the season.

=== S5000 Tasman Series ===
In 2021, Katayama raced outside of Asia for the first time by competing in the S5000 Tasman Series with Team BRM. He finished the season in eleventh.

=== Super GT ===
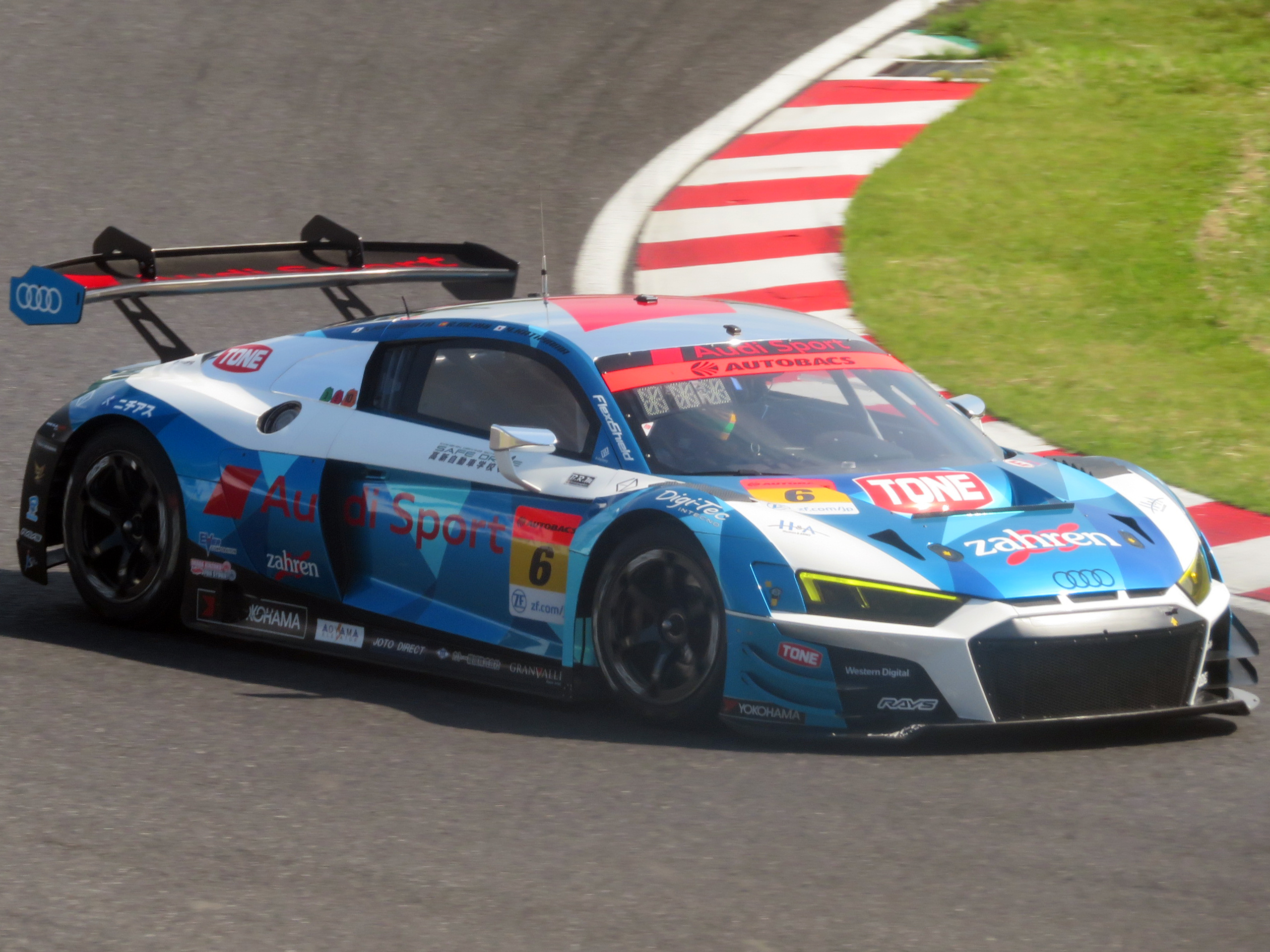
Katayama's Audi R8 LMS in 2022

In 2021, Katayama made his debut in sports car racing by competing in the GT300-class of the Super GT Series for Team LeMans with Satoshi Motoyama being his teammate.

In 2022, Katayama remained in the Super GT Series with the same team. He finished the season in 21st.

In 2023, Katayama would remain in the Super GT Series for a third season with the team. His teammate would be Roberto Merhi.

== Racing record ==
=== Career summary ===
Season	Series	Team	Races	Wins	Poles	F/Laps	Podiums	Points	Position
2015	F4 Japanese Championship	miNami aoYama with SARD	3	0	0	0	0	0	34th
2016	Japanese Formula 3 Championship	Petit Lemans Racing	17	0	0	0	0	0	NC
2016	Japanese Formula 3 Championship - National	Petit Lemans Racing	17	9	12	11	13	139	**1st**
2016–17	MRF Challenge Formula 2000 Championship	MRF Racing	16	0	0	1	0	32	11th
2017	Japanese Formula 3 Championship	OKAYAMA KOKUSAI CIRCUIT RC	20	0	0	0	0	11	9th
2018	Japanese Formula 3 Championship	OIRC team YTB	19	0	0	0	0	14	7th
2018	Macau Grand Prix	Carlin	2	0	0	0	0	N/A	17th
2019	Japanese Formula 3 Championship	OIRC team YTB by Carlin	20	1	0	0	2	34	7th
2020	Super Formula Lights	B-Max Racing	5	0	0	0	1	10	6th
2021	Formula Regional Japanese Championship	Privateer	3	3	2	2	3	75	6th
2021	S5000 Tasman Series	Team BRM	6	0	0	0	0	48	11th
2021	Super GT - GT300	Team LeMans with Motoyama Racing	8	0	0	0	0	0	NC
2022	Formula Regional Japanese Championship	Team LeMans with OIRC	15	1	3	2	10	212	**3rd**
2022	Super GT - GT300	Team LeMans	8	0	0	0	0	12	21st
2023	Super GT - GT300	Team LeMans	8	0	0	0	3	37	9th
2024	Super GT - GT300	Team LeMans	8	0	1	0	1	28	10th
2025	Super GT - GT300	Velorex	8	1	0	0	1	43.5	15th
2026	Super GT - GT300	Velorex	8	0	0	0	0	32	22nd

=== Complete F4 Japanese Championship Results ===
(key) (Races in bold indicate pole position) (Races in italics indicate fastest lap)

Year	Team	1	2	3	4	5	6	7	8	9	10	11	12	13	14	Rank	Points
2015	miNami aoYama with SARD	OKA; 1; 21	OKA; 2; 13	FSW; 1 DNS	FSW; 2 Ret	FSW; 1	FSW; 2	SUZ; 1	SUZ; 2	SUG; 1	SUG; 2	AUT; 1	AUT; 2	MOT; 1	MOT; 2	34th	0

=== Complete Japanese Formula 3 Championship Results ===
(key) (Races in bold indicate pole position) (Races in italics indicate fastest lap)

Year	Team	Engine	Class	1	2	3	4	5	6	7	8	9	10	11	12	13	14	15	16	17	18	19	20	21	Rank	Points
2016	Petit Lemans Racing	Toyota	N	SUZ1; 1; 1	SUZ1; 2; 1	FSW1; 1 Ret	FSW1; 2; 1	OKA1; 1; 1	OKA1; 2; 1	SUZ2; 1 Ret	SUZ2; 2; 3	FSW2; 1; 2	FSW2; 2; 5	MOT; 1; 3	MOT; 1; 1	OKA2; 1; 1	OKA2; 2; 1	SUG; 1; 1	SUG; 2; 2	SUG; 3 Ret					139	1st
2017	Okayama Kokusai Circuit RC	Mercedes-Benz		OKA1; 1; 7	OKA1; 2 Ret	OKA1; 3; 8	SUZ1; 1; 8	SUZ1; 2; 5	FUJ1; 1; 8	FUJ1; 2; 9	OKA2; 1; 14	OKA2; 2; 7	SUZ2; 1; 8	SUZ2; 2; 6	FUJ2; 1; 15	FUJ2; 2 Ret	MOT; 1; 5	MOT; 2; 5	MOT; 3; 5	AUT; 1; 6	AUT; 2; 9	SUG; 1; 6	SUG; 2; 8		11	9th
2018	OIRC team YTB	Mercedes-Benz		SUZ; 1 Ret	SUZ; 2; 4	SUG1; 1; 7	SUG1; 2; 6	FUJ1; 1; 7	FUJ1; 2; 14	OKA1; 1; 7	OKA1; 2; 6	OKA1; 3 C	MOT; 1; 6	MOT; 2 Ret	MOT; 3; 5	OKA2; 1; 7	OKA2; 2; 7	OKA2; 3 C	SUG2; 1; 5	SUG2; 2; 6	SUG2; 3; 5	SUG2; 4; 9	FUJ2; 1; 11	FUJ2; 2 Ret	14	7th
2019	OIRC team YTB by Carlin	Mercedes-Benz		SUZ; 1; 8	SUZ; 2; 8	AUT; 1; 8	AUT; 2; 9	AUT; 3; 4	OKA1; 1; 2	OKA1; 2; 4	OKA1; 3; 1	SUG1; 1; 7	SUG1; 2; 5	FUJ; 1; 5	FUJ; 2; 7	SUG2; 1; 7	SUG2; 2; 5	SUG2; 3; 7	MOT; 1; 6	MOT; 2; 7	MOT; 3; 9	OKA2; 1; 6	OKA2; 2; 4		34	7th

=== Complete MRF Challenge Formula 2000 Championship ===
(key) (Races in bold indicate pole position) (Races in italics indicate fastest lap)

Year	Team	1	2	3	4	5	6	7	8	9	10	11	12	13	14	15	16	Rank	Points
2016–17	MRF Racing	BHR; 1; 10	BHR; 2; 12	BHR; 3; 9	BHR; 4; 10	DUB; 1; 16	DUB; 2; 12	DUB; 3; 10	DUB; 4; 7	GNO; 1; 8	GNO; 2; 7	GNO; 3; 11	GNO; 4; 10	CHE; 1; 11	CHE; 2; 12	CHE; 3; 8	CHE; 4; 9	32	11th

=== Complete Macau Grand Prix results ===
Year	Team	Car	Qualifying	Quali Race	Main race
2018	(United Kingdom) Carlin	Dallara F317	27th	DNF	17th

=== Complete Super Formula Lights Championship Results ===
(key) (Races in bold indicate pole position) (Races in italics indicate fastest lap)

Year	Team	1	2	3	4	5	6	7	8	9	10	11	12	13	14	15	16	17	Rank	Points
2020	B-Max Racing	MOT; 1	MOT; 2	MOT; 3	OKA; 1; 3	OKA; 2 Ret	SUG; 1	SUG; 2	SUG; 3	AUT; 1	AUT; 2	AUT; 3	SUZ; 1; 4	SUZ; 2; 5	SUZ; 3; 7	FSW; 1	FSW; 2	FSW; 3	10	6th

=== Complete S5000 Tasman Series Results ===
(key) (Races in bold indicate pole position) (Races in italics indicate fastest lap)

Year	Team	1	2	3	4	5	6	7	Rank	Points
2021	Team BRM	SYD; 1; 8	SYD; 2 Ret	SYD; 3; 8	BAT; 1; 8	BAT; 2 Ret	BAT; 3 Ret	BAT; 4 C	11th	48

=== Complete Formula Regional Japanese Championship Results ===
(key) (Races in bold indicate pole position) (Races in italics indicate fastest lap)

Year	Team	1	2	3	4	5	6	7	8	9	10	11	12	13	14	15	16	17	Rank	Points
2021	Privateer	OKA; 1; 1	OKA; 2; **1**	OKA; 3; **1**	MOT; 1	MOT; 2	MOT; 3	FUJ; 1	FUJ; 2	FUJ; 3	SUG; 1	SUG; 2	SUZ; 1	SUZ; 2					6th	75
2022	Team LeMans with OIRC	FUJ1; 1; 3	FUJ1; 2; 3	FUJ1; 3; 4	**OKA**; **1**; **1**	**OKA**; **2**; **3**	**OKA**; **3**; **2**	MOT; 1; 2	MOT; 2 Ret	MOT; 3; 3	SUG; 1; 4	SUG; 2; 3	SUG; 3; 4	FUJ2; 1; 3	FUJ2; 2; 5	FUJ2; 3; 3	SUZ; 1	SUZ; 2	3rd	212

=== Complete Super GT - GT300 Results ===
(key) (Races in bold indicate pole position) (Races in italics indicate fastest lap)

Year	Team	Car	Class	1	2	3	4	5	6	7	8	9	Rank	Points
2021	Team LeMans with Motoyama Racing	Audi R8 LMS Evo	GT300	OKA; 22	FUJ; 23	MOT; 19	SUZ; 12	SUG; 18	AUT; 24	MOT; 20	FUJ; 18		NC	0
2022	Team LeMans with Motoyama Racing	Audi R8 LMS Evo II	GT300	OKA; 5									12th	12
2022	Team LeMans	Audi R8 LMS Evo II	GT300		FUJ; 14	SUZ; 18	FUJ; 16	SUZ; 5	SUG; 16	AUT; 20	MOT; 13		12th	12
2023	Team LeMans	Audi R8 LMS Evo II	GT300	OKA; 21	FUJ; 7	SUZ; 15	FUJ; 3	SUZ; Ret	SUG; 3	AUT; 15	MOT; 3		9th	37
2024	Team LeMans	Ferrari 296 GT3	GT300	OKA; 10	FUJ; 13	SUZ; 3	FUJ; 9	SUG; Ret	**AUT**; 8	MOT; 9	SUZ; 5		10th	28
2025	Velorex	Ferrari 296 GT3	GT300	OKA; DSQ	FUJ; 1	SEP; 13	FS1 (15)	FS2; Ret	SUZ; 18	SUG; 12	AUT; 5	MOT; Ret	15th	43.5
2026	Velorex	Ferrari 296 GT3	GT300	OKA; 9	FUJ; 23								22nd	32
2026	Velorex	Ferrari 296 GT3 Evo	GT300			FUJ; 9	SUZ; 18	SUG; 9	AUT; 11	MOT; 10	MOT; 17		22nd	32

^{‡} Half points awarded as less than 75% of race distance was completed.
^{(Number)} Driver did not take part in this sprint race, points are still awarded for the teammate's result.
^{*} Season still in progress.
