= 2016 Japanese Formula 3 Championship =

The 2016 Japanese Formula 3 Championship was the 38th edition of the Japanese Formula 3 Championship.

== Teams and drivers ==
All teams were Japanese-registered.

Team	Chassis	Engine	No.	Driver	Status	Rounds
Toda Racing	Dallara F316	Toda TR-F301	2	(Japan) Keishi Ishikawa		All
Toda Racing	Dallara F316	Toda TR-F301	12	(Japan) Tadasuke Makino		2–8
Toda Racing	Dallara F314	Toda TR-F301	12	(Japan) Tadasuke Makino		1
B-Max Racing Team	Dallara F312	Toyota TOM'S TAZ31	3	(Japan) Ai Miura		All
B-Max Racing Team	Dallara F308	Toyota TOM'S 3S-GE	11	(Japan) Masayuki Ueda	N	7–8
B-Max Racing Team	Dallara F308	Toyota TOM'S 3S-GE	30	(Japan) "Dragon"	N	1–3, 5
B-Max Racing Team	Dallara F306	Toyota TOM'S 3S-GE	30	(Japan) "Dragon"	N	4, 6–8
B-Max Racing Team with NDDP	Dallara F312	Volkswagen A41	21	(Japan) Daiki Sasaki		1–2
B-Max Racing Team with NDDP	Dallara F312	Volkswagen A41	21	(Japan) Mitsunori Takaboshi		3–4
B-Max Racing Team with NDDP	Dallara F314	Volkswagen A41	22	(United Kingdom) Jann Mardenborough		All
B-Max Racing Team with NDDP	Dallara F315	Volkswagen A41	23	(Japan) Katsumasa Chiyo		1–4
B-Max Racing Team with NDDP	Dallara F312	Volkswagen A41	23	(Japan) Katsumasa Chiyo		5, 8
B-Max Racing Team with NDDP	Dallara F312	Volkswagen A41	23	(Japan) Mitsunori Takaboshi		6–7
Team KRC with B-Max	Dallara F315	Volkswagen A41	21	(China) Ye Hongli		5–8
Hanashima Racing	Dallara F306	Toyota TOM'S 3S-GE	5	(China) Alex Yang	N	All
HFDP Racing	Dallara F312	Mugen-Honda MF204D	7	(Japan) Sena Sakaguchi		All
HFDP Racing	Dallara F312	Mugen-Honda MF204D	8	(Japan) Hiroki Otsu		All
Albirex Racing Team	Dallara F306	Toyota TOM'S 3S-GE	9	(Japan) Kizuku Hirota	N	All
Albirex Racing Team	Dallara F308	Toyota TOM'S 3S-GE	10	(Japan) Zene Okazaki	N	1–5
Team Samurai	Dallara F306	Toyota TOM'S 3S-GE	25	(Japan) Takamitsu Matsui	N	5
Tairoku Exceed	Dallara F316	Toyota TOM'S TAZ31	28	(Japan) Tairoku Yamaguchi		1–2
Tairoku Racing	Dallara F312	Toyota TOM'S TAZ31	28	(Japan) Tairoku Yamaguchi		3–4
Tairoku Racing	Dallara F316	Volkswagen A41	28	(Japan) Tairoku Yamaguchi		5–8
Team TOM'S	Dallara F312	Toyota TOM'S TAZ31	36	(Japan) Kenta Yamashita		All
Team TOM'S	Dallara F314	Toyota TOM'S TAZ31	37	(Japan) Sho Tsuboi		All
Petit Lemans Racing	Dallara F308	Toyota TOM'S 3S-GE	46	(Japan) Katsuaki Kubota	N	8
Petit Lemans Racing	Dallara F306	Toyota TOM'S 3S-GE	78	(Japan) Yoshiaki Katayama	N	All

Icon	Class
N	National class.

== Race calendar and results ==
A provisional calendar for the 2016 championship. All races are scheduled to be held in Japan.

The Autopolis round was cancelled on May 29 due to damages caused by the Kumamoto earthquake. However, on July 15, it was decided that Okayama would take its place at the same date.

Round		Circuit	Date	Pole position	Fastest lap	Winning driver	Winning team	National winner	Supporting
1	R1	Suzuka Circuit	23 April	(Japan) Kenta Yamashita	(Japan) Daiki Sasaki	(Japan) Kenta Yamashita	Team TOM'S	(Japan) Yoshiaki Katayama	Super Formula
1	R2	Suzuka Circuit	24 April	(Japan) Kenta Yamashita	(Japan) Kenta Yamashita	(Japan) Kenta Yamashita	Team TOM'S	(Japan) Yoshiaki Katayama	Super Formula
2	R1	Fuji Speedway	14 May	(United Kingdom) Jann Mardenborough	(Japan) Daiki Sasaki	(Japan) Daiki Sasaki	B-Max Racing Team with NDDP	(China) Alex Yang	
2	R2	Fuji Speedway	15 May	(Japan) Daiki Sasaki	(Japan) Daiki Sasaki	(Japan) Daiki Sasaki	B-Max Racing Team with NDDP	(Japan) Yoshiaki Katayama	
3	R1	Okayama International Circuit	28 May	(United Kingdom) Jann Mardenborough	(Japan) Kenta Yamashita	(Japan) Kenta Yamashita	Team TOM'S	(Japan) Yoshiaki Katayama	Super Formula
3	R2	Okayama International Circuit	29 May	(United Kingdom) Jann Mardenborough	(United Kingdom) Jann Mardenborough	(United Kingdom) Jann Mardenborough	B-Max Racing Team with NDDP	(Japan) Yoshiaki Katayama	Super Formula
4	R1	Suzuka Circuit	11 June	(Japan) Kenta Yamashita	(United Kingdom) Jann Mardenborough	(Japan) Mitsunori Takaboshi	B-Max Racing Team with NDDP	(Japan) Kizuku Hirota	Super Taikyu
4	R2	Suzuka Circuit	12 June	(Japan) Kenta Yamashita	(United Kingdom) Jann Mardenborough	(Japan) Mitsunori Takaboshi	B-Max Racing Team with NDDP	(Japan) Kizuku Hirota	Super Taikyu
5	R1	Fuji Speedway	16 July	(United Kingdom) Jann Mardenborough	(Japan) Katsumasa Chiyo	(United Kingdom) Jann Mardenborough	B-Max Racing Team with NDDP	(Japan) Takamitsu Matsui	Super Formula
5	R2	Fuji Speedway	17 July	(United Kingdom) Jann Mardenborough	(Japan) Katsumasa Chiyo	(Japan) Katsumasa Chiyo	B-Max Racing Team with NDDP	(Japan) Takamitsu Matsui	Super Formula
6	R1	Twin Ring Motegi	20 August	(Japan) Tadasuke Makino	(United Kingdom) Jann Mardenborough	(United Kingdom) Jann Mardenborough	B-Max Racing Team with NDDP	(Japan) "Dragon"	Super Formula
6	R2	Twin Ring Motegi	21 August	(United Kingdom) Jann Mardenborough	(United Kingdom) Jann Mardenborough	(United Kingdom) Jann Mardenborough	B-Max Racing Team with NDDP	(Japan) Yoshiaki Katayama	Super Formula
7	R1	Okayama International Circuit	10 September	(Japan) Kenta Yamashita	(Japan) Kenta Yamashita	(Japan) Kenta Yamashita	Team TOM'S	(Japan) Yoshiaki Katayama	Super Formula
7	R2	Okayama International Circuit	11 September	(Japan) Mitsunori Takaboshi	(Japan) Mitsunori Takaboshi	(Japan) Mitsunori Takaboshi	B-Max Racing Team with NDDP	(Japan) Yoshiaki Katayama	Super Formula
8	R1	Sportsland SUGO	24 September	(Japan) Kenta Yamashita	(Japan) Kenta Yamashita	(Japan) Kenta Yamashita	Team TOM'S	(Japan) Yoshiaki Katayama	Super Formula
8	R2	Sportsland SUGO	25 September	(Japan) Kenta Yamashita	(Japan) Sho Tsuboi	(Japan) Kenta Yamashita	Team TOM'S	(Japan) "Dragon"	Super Formula
8	R3	Sportsland SUGO	25 September		(United Kingdom) Jann Mardenborough	(Japan) Kenta Yamashita	Team TOM'S	(Japan) "Dragon"	Super Formula

== Championship standings ==
=== Drivers' Championships ===
- Points are awarded as follows:

1	2	3	4	5	6	PP	FL
10	7	5	3	2	1	**1**	1

==== Overall ====
Pos	Driver	SUZ1		FUJ1		OKA1		SUZ2		FUJ2		MOT		OKA2		SUG			Points
1	(Japan) Kenta Yamashita	**1**	**1**	5	2	1	6	**Ret**	**2**	6	4	5	2	**1**	5	**1**	**1**	1	113
2	(United Kingdom) Jann Mardenborough	2	3	**2**	4	**8**	**1**	10	3	**1**	**2**	1	**1**	4	8	2	2	2	110
3	(Japan) Sho Tsuboi	3	2	3	3	2	3	2	DNS	2	3	3	3	3	4	3	3	3	87
4	(Japan) Mitsunori Takaboshi					4	8	1	1			7	8	2	**1**				42
5	(Japan) Tadasuke Makino	8	6	6	6	Ret	2	4	6	3	5	**2**	5	5	3	4	9	7	41
6	(Japan) Katsumasa Chiyo	4	8	4	16	3	9	3	4	4	1					Ret	7	8	34
7	(Japan) Daiki Sasaki	5	4	1	**1**														29
8	(Japan) Keishi Ishikawa	6	5	7	5	Ret	5	5	5	7	9	4	7	9	7	5	4	4	22
9	(Japan) Sena Sakaguchi	9	7	8	7	6	4	7	7	5	8	6	6	6	2	7	5	5	20
10	(Japan) Hiroki Otsu	7	9	9	9	5	7	6	8	8	6	Ret	11	8	Ret	6	8	6	6
11	(China) Ye Hongli									9	7	8	4	7	6	8	6	9	5
12	(Japan) Tairoku Yamaguchi	WD	WD	11	10	7	Ret	9	10	12	10	9	9	11	Ret	Ret	11	11	0
13	(Japan) Ai Miura	10	10	10	8	9	Ret	8	9	Ret	16	10	10	10	9	Ret	10	10	0
14	(Japan) Yoshiaki Katayama	11	11	Ret	11	10	10	Ret	13	11	15	13	12	12	10	9	13	Ret	0
15	(Japan) "Dragon"	Ret	12	13	12	14	11	12	12	Ret	12	11	13	13	11	10	12	12	0
16	(Japan) Takamitsu Matsui									10	11								0
17	(Japan) Kizuku Hirota	12	13	14	13	12	Ret	11	11	Ret	13	12	Ret	14	13	12	14	15	0
18	(China) Alex Yang	Ret	14	12	14	11	13	13	15	Ret	Ret	Ret	Ret	15	12	13	16	14	0
19	(Japan) Masayuki Ueda													Ret	Ret	11	15	13	0
20	(Japan) Zene Okazaki	13	15	15	15	13	12	14	14	Ret	14								0
21	(Japan) Katsuaki Kubota															14	17	Ret	0
Pos	Driver	SUZ1		FUJ1		OKA1		SUZ2		FUJ2		MOT		OKA2		SUG			Points

Colour	Result
Gold	Winner
Silver	Second place
Bronze	Third place
Green	Points classification
Blue	Non-points classification
Blue	Non-classified finish (NC)
Purple	Retired, not classified (Ret)
Red	Did not qualify (DNQ)
Red	Did not pre-qualify (DNPQ)
Black	Disqualified (DSQ)
White	Did not start (DNS)
White	Withdrew (WD)
White	Race cancelled (C)
Blank	Did not practice (DNP)
Blank	Did not arrive (DNA)
Blank	Excluded (EX)

**Bold** – Pole
Italics – Fastest Lap

==== National Class ====
Pos	Driver	SUZ1		FUJ1		OKA1		SUZ2		FUJ2		MOT		OKA2		SUG			Points
1	(Japan) Yoshiaki Katayama	**11**	**11**	Ret	**11**	10	**10**	**Ret**	**13**	11	15	**13**	**12**	**12**	**10**	**9**	**13**	Ret	139
2	(Japan) "Dragon"	Ret	12	**13**	12	**14**	11	12	12	Ret	12	11	13	13	11	10	12	12	113
3	(Japan) Kizuku Hirota	12	13	14	13	12	Ret	11	11	Ret	13	12	15	14	13	12	14	15	82
4	(China) Alex Yang	Ret	14	12	14	11	13	13	15	Ret	Ret	Ret	14	15	12	13	16	14	56
5	(Japan) Zene Okazaki	13	15	15	15	13	12	14	14	Ret	14								29
6	(Japan) Takamitsu Matsui									**10**	**11**								24
7	(Japan) Masayuki Ueda													Ret	Ret	11	15	13	15
8	(Japan) Katsuaki Kubota															14	17	Ret	2
Pos	Driver	SUZ1		FUJ1		OKA1		SUZ2		FUJ2		MOT		OKA2		SUG			Points

=== Teams Championship ===
Pos.	Team	Points
1	B-Max Racing Team with NDDP	145
2	Team TOM'S	128
3	Toda Racing	50
4	HFDP Racing	24
NC	Team KRC with B-Max	0
NC	Tairoku Racing	0
NC	Hanashima Racing	0
NC	Albirex Racing Team	0
NC	Team Samurai	0
NC	Petit Lemans Racing	0
Ref:

=== Engine tuner standings ===
Pos.	Engine tuner	Points
1	Siegfried Spiess Motorenbau GmbH	145
2	TOM'S	128
3	Toda Racing	50
4	M-TEC	24
