= Mitsunori Takaboshi =

Japanese racing driver

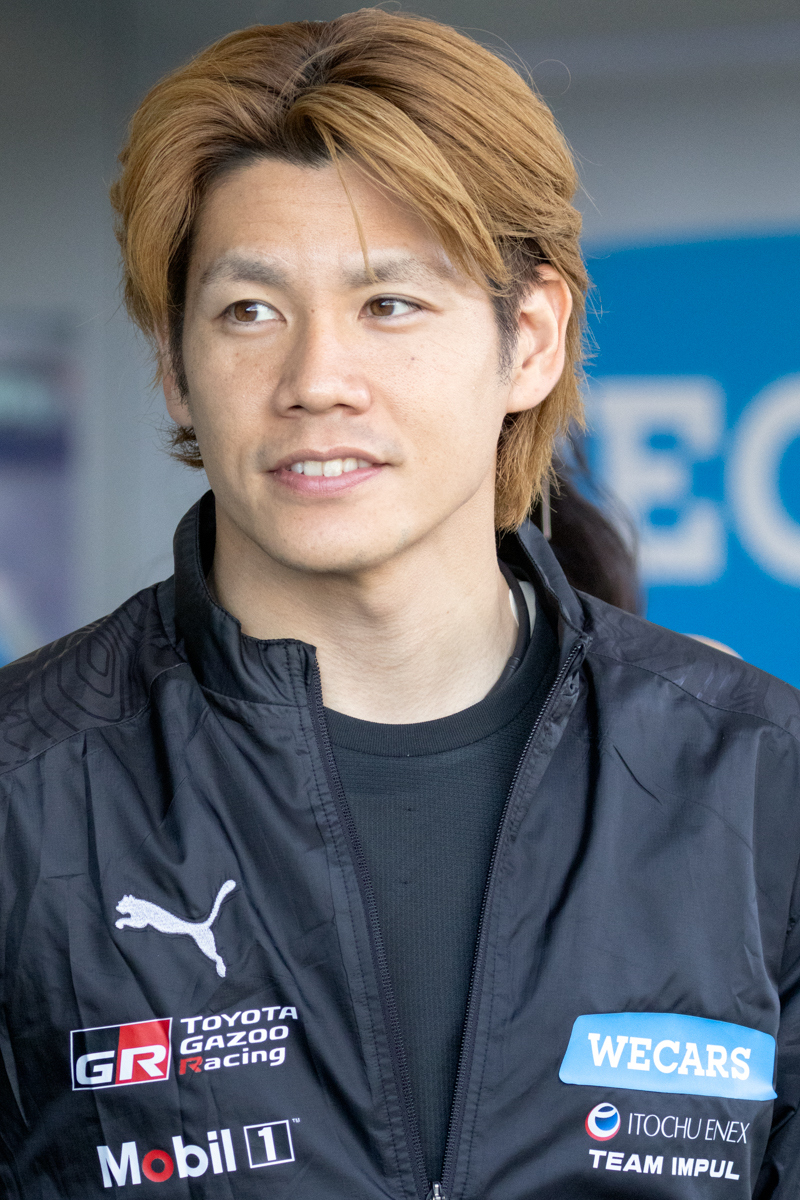
- Mitsunori Takaboshi at Suzuka Circuit in November 2025
- Nationality: (Japan) Japanese
- Born: 24 January 1993 (age 33) Hiratsuka, Japan

Super GT - GT500 career
- Debut season: 2016
- Current team: NISMO
- Categorisation: FIA Gold
- Car number: 23
- Former teams: Kondo Racing, MOLA, NISMO NDDP
- Starts: 65
- Wins: 5
- Podiums: 11
- Poles: 1
- Best finish: 2nd in 2022 & 2023

Super Formula Championship career
- Debut season: 2020
- Current team: Team Impul
- Car number: 20
- Former teams: B-Max Racing Team
- Starts: 14
- Wins: 0
- Podiums: 0
- Poles: 0
- Fastest laps: 0
- Best finish: 19th in 2025

Previous series
- 2020 2016 2016 2015-2017 2013–2017 2010–2012: Super Formula Lights; Blancpain GT Series Endurance Cup; Blancpain GT Series Sprint Cup; Super GT - GT300; Japanese Formula 3 Championship; Formula Challenge Japan

Championship titles
- 2017: Japanese Formula 3 Championship

Mitsunori Takaboshi (高星 明誠, Takaboshi Mitsunori; born 24 January 1993) is a Japanese racing driver. In 2017, he was crowned champion in the Japanese Formula 3 Championship.

== Career ==
=== Early career ===
Takaboshi started his career in karting in 1998, in which he remained active until 2009. He mainly raced in Japanese championships and won a number of titles. In 2010, he switched to formula racing and competed in the Formula Challenge Japan, in which he competed until 2012. In his first season, he scored no points and his best result was ninth at the Fuji Speedway. In 2011, he improved himself to seventh in the final standings with 22 points and a podium finish. 2012 would prove to be his best season in the class, with two wins at the Twin Ring Motegi and the Suzuka International Racing Course, as well as four other podium finishes. With 65 points, he finished third in the final standings behind Nobuharu Matsushita and Ryō Hirakawa.

In 2013, Takaboshi made his Formula 3 debut in the Japanese Formula 3 Championship, playing as a protégé of Nissan for the NDDP Racing team in the national class. He won eleven races in this class and finished second in the remaining four races to win the convincing championship with 163 points. His results also qualified for the main division, where four fifth places were his best results. He finished seventh overall with 9 points.

In 2014, Takaboshi competed in the Japanese Formula 3 premier class, driving for the B-MAX Racing Team with NDDP. He won three races at Suzuka, Fuji and Motegi and was on the podium in four other races. With 82 points, he finished third in the standings behind Nobuharu Matsushita and Kenta Yamashita. At the end of the year, he also drove for B-MAX in the Macau Grand Prix, finishing eighteenth.

In 2015, Takaboshi won the Japanese Formula 3 season opener in Suzuka, adding two more wins later in the year at the Okayama International Circuit. He was on the podium nine more times in the rest of the season. With 92 points, he was again third in the championship behind Nick Cassidy and Kenta Yamashita. At the end of the year, Takaboshi again took part in the Macau Grand Prix, but did not finish the race.

In addition for 2016, Takaboshi drove in half of the Japanese Formula 3 races with the B-MAX Racing Team with NDDP, winning two races at Suzuka and one at Okayama. Although he missed half the races, he finished fourth overall with 42 points behind Kenta Yamashita, Jann Mardenborough and Sho Tsuboi. In 2017, Takaboshi returned as a full-time driver in Japanese Formula 3 with the B-MAX Racing Team with NDDP. He won seven races: three at Okayama, two at Suzuka and two at Fuji, as well as finishing on the podium in nine other races. He became champion in class with 148 points.

=== Super Formula ===
For 2020, Takaboshi returned to open wheel Formula racing, joining B-Max Racing to race in 2020 Super Formula Championship for one round in the second race of the season. He replaced Teppei Natori who raced for one round but unable to continue due to a medical condition. He also he competed in 2020 Super Formula Lights with the same team. He returned once again in 2021 for Super Formula, but this time he covered up Ryo Hirakawa for Team Impul due to Hirakawa tests Toyota Gazoo Racing Europe's Toyota GR010 Hybrid car.

Takaboshi made his full season debut in Super Formula in 2025 with Team Impul.

=== Super GT ===
==== GT300 ====
Takaboshi made his debut in 2015 competed in the GT300 class of the Super GT at NDDP Racing, sharing a Nissan GT-R GT3 with Kazuki Hoshino. The duo won two races at the Chang International Circuit and Autopolis, and also scored a podium at Fuji. They finished fourth in the final standings with 61 points. He also drove in three GT300 class races with the Dijon Racing team in a Nissan GT-R GT3, where he shared a car with Takayuki Aoki. Tenth place at Motegi was his best result and he was 28th in the championship with one point.

For 2017, Takaboshi also returned to Super GT with NDDP Racing and again shared a Nissan GT-R GT3 with Kazuki Hoshino for 2017. With a sixth place at Fuji as his best result, he finished seventeenth in the final standings.

==== GT500 ====
Takaboshi made his GT500 debut in the race at Suzuka with the MOLA team, sharing a Nissan GT-R with Satoshi Motoyama as a one-time replacement for Katsumasa Chiyo. They finished the race in third place, making Takaboshi seventeenth in the final standings with 13 points.

In 2018, Takaboshi only competed in the Super GT, in which he made a permanent switch to the GT500 class to share a Nissan GT-R with João Paulo de Oliveira with the Kondo Racing team. Their best results were three sixth places at Okayama, Fuji and the Sportsland SUGO, leaving them with 23 points. Staying with the same team, he teamed up with fellow Nissan driver Jann Mardenborough for 2019 & 2020. For 2021, with Kondo Racing teamed with Daiki Sasaki.

=== Endurance racing ===
In 2016, Takaboshi made the move to Europe, where he competed in both the Blancpain GT Series Sprint Cup and Blancpain GT Series Endurance Cup for Nissan GT Academy Team RJN. In the Sprint Cup, he shared a Nissan GT-R Nismo GT3 with Alex Buncombe, while in the Endurance Cup he shared the same car with Buncombe and Lucas Ordóñez. In the Sprint Cup, a ninth place in the qualifying race on the Circuit de Barcelona-Catalunya was his best finish, leaving him scoreless in 33rd place in the championship. In the Endurance Cup, he achieved a podium finish in the season final at the Nürburgring to finish ninth overall with 39 points.

== Racing record ==
=== Career summary ===
Season	Series	Team	Races	Wins	Poles	F/Laps	Podiums	Points	Position
2010	Formula Challenge Japan	NDDP FCJ	11	0	0	0	0	0	NC
2011	Formula Challenge Japan	NDDP FCJ	13	0	0	1	1	22	7th
2012	Formula Challenge Japan	NDDP	12	2	2	3	6	65	**3rd**
2013	Japanese Formula 3 Championship	NDDP Racing	15	0	0	0	0	9	7th
2014	Japanese Formula 3 Championship	B-Max Racing Team with NDDP	15	3	4	4	7	82	**3rd**
2014	Macau Grand Prix	B-Max Engineering	2	0	0	0	0	N/A	18th
2015	Japanese Formula 3 Championship	B-Max Racing Team with NDDP	17	3	1	2	12	92	**3rd**
2015	Macau Grand Prix	B-Max Engineering	2	0	0	0	0	N/A	DNF
2015	Super GT - GT300	NDDP Racing	8	2	0	0	3	61	4th
2016	Japanese Formula 3 Championship	B-Max Racing Team with NDDP	8	3	1	1	4	42	4th
2016	Super GT - GT300	Dijon Racing	3	0	0	0	0	1	28th
2016	Super GT - GT500	MOLA	1	0	0	0	1	13	17th
2016	Blancpain GT Series Endurance Cup	Nissan GT Academy Team RJN	5	0	0	0	1	39	9th
2016	Blancpain GT Series Sprint Cup	Nissan GT Academy Team RJN	8	0	0	0	0	0	33rd
2017	Japanese Formula 3 Championship	B-Max Racing Team with NDDP	20	7	3	11	16	148	**1st**
2017	Super GT - GT300	NDDP Racing	8	0	0	0	0	17	17th
2017–18	Formula E	Renault e.dams	Test driver						
2018	Super GT - GT500	Kondo Racing	8	0	0	0	0	23	14th
2018–19	Formula E	Nissan e.dams	Test/reserve driver						
2019	Super GT - GT500	Kondo Racing	8	0	0	1	0	17	14th
2019	24 Hours of Nürburgring - SP9	Kondo Racing	1	0	0	0	0	N/A	9th
2019–20	Formula E	Nissan e.dams	Test/reserve driver						
2020	Super Formula Lights	B-Max Racing	3	0	0	0	0	8	7th
2020	Super Formula	Buzz Racing with B-MAX	1	0	0	0	0	0	26th
2020	Super GT - GT500	Kondo Racing	8	0	0	0	0	4	19th
2020–21	Formula E	Nissan e.dams	Test/reserve driver						
2021	Super Formula	carenex Team Impul	1	0	0	0	0	0	21st
2021	Super GT - GT 500	Kondo Racing	8	0	0	0	1	20	15th
2021	Super Taikyu - ST-Z	B-Max Engineering	1	0	0	0	0	14‡	13th‡
2021–22	Formula E	Nissan e.dams	Test/reserve driver						
2022	Super GT - GT500	NDDP Racing	8	2	0	0	2	66	**2nd**
2022	Super Taikyu - ST-Q	Max Racing							
2023	Super GT - GT500	NDDP Racing	8	1	1	0	3	63	**2nd**
2023	Super Taikyu - ST-Q	NISMO							NC
2024	Super GT - GT500	NDDP NISMO	8	1	0	1	2	54	**3rd**
2024	Super Taikyu - ST-Q	NISMO							NC
2025	Super GT - GT500	NISMO	8	1	0	1	2	49	6th
2025	Super Formula	Itochu Enex Wecars Team Impul	12	0	0	0	0	0	19th
2026	Super GT - GT500	NISMO	8	0	0	0	2	40	9th

^{*} Season still in progress.
‡ Team standings

=== Complete Formula Challenge Japan results ===
(key) (Races in bold indicate pole position) (Races in italics indicate fastest lap)

Year	Team	1	2	3	4	5	6	7	8	9	10	11	12	13	14	DC	Pts
2010	NDDP FCJ	MOT1; 1; 19	MOT1; 2; 13	FUJ1; 1; 11	FUJ1; 2; 14	FUJ2; 1; 9	FUJ2; 2; 10	MOT2; 1; 11	MOT2; 2 DSQ	SUZ1; 14	SUZ2; 1; 12	SUZ2; 2; 14	SUZ2; 3; 14			17th	0
2011	NDDP FCJ	FUJ1; 1; 3	FUJ1; 2; 16	SUZ1; 1; 4	SUZ1; 2; 2	FUJ2; 1; 6	FUJ2; 2; 14	FUJ2; 3; 5	SUZ2; C	SUZ3; 1; 6	SUZ3; 2; 8	MOT; 1; 19	MOT; 2; 10	MOT; 3; 10	MOT; 4; 5	7th	22
2012	NDDP Daishin	FUJ1; 1; 4	FUJ1; 2; 15	**MOT**; **1**; 2	**MOT**; **2**; 1	FUJ2; 1; 5	FUJ2; 2; 3	FUJ2; 3; 4	SUZ1; 1; 4	SUZ1; 2; 2	SUZ2; 1; 4	SUZ2; 2; 2	SUZ2; 3; 1			3rd	65

=== Complete Japanese Formula 3 results ===
(key) (Races in bold indicate pole position) (Races in italics indicate fastest lap)

Year	Team	Engine	Class	1	2	3	4	5	6	7	8	9	10	11	12	13	14	15	16	17	18	19	20	DC	Pts
2013	NDDP Racing	Toyota	N	**SUZ**; **1**; 7	**SUZ**; **2**; 7	**MOT**; **1**; 7	**MOT**; **2**; 7	MOT; 3; 7	**OKA**; **1**; 5	**OKA**; **2**; 6	FUJ; 1; 8	**FUJ**; **2**; 5	**MOT**; **1**; 7	**MOT**; **2**; 8	**SUG**; **1**; 5	**SUG**; **2**; 7	**FUJ**; **1**; 8	**FUJ**; **2**; 5						**1st**	**163**
2014	B-Max Racing Team with NDDP Racing	Toyota		**SUZ**; **1**; 2	SUZ; 2; 1	MOT; 1; 3	MOT; 2; 4	MOT; 3; 4	OKA; 1; 3	OKA; 2; 4	**FUJ**; **1**; 1	FUJ; 2; 4	MOT; 1; 2	**MOT**; **2**; 1	SUG; 1; 4	**SUG**; **2** Ret	FUJ; 1; 4	FUJ; 2; 5						**3rd**	**82**
2015	B-Max Racing Team with NDDP Racing	Toyota		SUZ; 1; 1	SUZ; 2; 2	MOT; 1; 3	MOT; 2; 2	MOT; 3; 4	OKA; 1; 3	OKA; 2; 3	FUJ; 1; 3	FUJ; 2; 2	OKA; 1; 1	OKA; 2; 1	FUJ; 1; 3	**FUJ**; **2** Ret	MOT; 1; 4	MOT; 2; 3	SUG; 1; 5	SUG; 2; 8				**3rd**	**92**
2016	B-Max Racing Team with NDDP Racing	Volkswagen		SUZ; 1	SUZ; 2	FUJ; 1	FUJ; 2	OKA; 1; 4	OKA; 2; 8	SUZ; 1; 1	SUZ; 2; 1	FUJ; 1	FUJ; 2	MOT; 1; 7	MOT; 2; 8	OKA; 1; 2	**OKA**; **2**; 1	SUG; 1	SUG; 2	SUG; 3				4th	142
2017	B-Max Racing Team with NDDP Racing	Volkswagen		OKA; 1; 1	OKA; 2; 2	OKA; 3; 1	**SUZ**; **1**; 1	**SUZ**; **2**; 1	FUJ; 1 DSQ	FUJ; 2; 1	**OKA**; **1**; 1	OKA; 2; 4	SUZ; 1; 3	SUZ; 2; 3	FUJ; 1; 1	FUJ; 2; 2	MOT; 1; 2	MOT; 2; 2	MOT; 3; 2	AUT; 1; 3	AUT; 2; 3	SUG; 1; 4	SUG; 2; 4	**1st**	**148**

=== Complete Super GT results ===
(key) (Races in bold indicate pole position) (Races in italics indicate fastest lap)

Year	Team	Car	Class	1	2	3	4	5	6	7	8	9	DC	Pts
2015	NDDP Racing	Nissan GT-R NISMO GT3	GT300	**OKA**; 8	FUJ; 2	CHA; 1	FUJ; Ret	SUZ; 14	SUG; 8	AUT; 1	MOT; Ret		4th	61
2016	Dijon Racing	Nissan GT-R NISMO GT3	GT300	OKA	FUJ	SUG	FUJ; 12		CHA	MOT; 10	MOT; 14		12th	23
2016	MOLA	Nissan GT-R NISMO GT500	GT500					SUZ; 3					12th	23
2017	NDDP Racing	Nissan GT-R NISMO GT3	GT300	OKA; 7	FUJ; 6	AUT; 9	SUG; 8	FUJ; Ret	SUZ; 14	CHA; 9	MOT; 10		17th	17
2018	Kondō Racing	Nissan GT-R NISMO GT500	GT500	OKA; 6	FUJ; 13	SUZ; 9	CHA; Ret	FUJ; 6	SUG; 6	AUT; 7	MOT; 10		14th	23
2019	Kondō Racing	Nissan GT-R NISMO GT500	GT500	OKA; 5‡	FUJ; 14	SUZ; 8	CHA; 4	FUJ; Ret	AUT; 9	SUG; 15	MOT; 10		14th	17
2020	Kondō Racing	Nissan GT-R NISMO GT500	GT500	FUJ; 10	FUJ; 12	SUZ; 11	MOT; 13	FUJ; 14	SUZ; 8	MOT; 14	FUJ; 13		19th	4
2021	Kondō Racing	Nissan GT-R NISMO GT500	GT500	FUJ; 14	FUJ; 12	SUZ; 12	MOT; 3	FUJ; 6	SUZ; 14	MOT; 7	FUJ; 11		15th	20
2022	NDDP Racing	Nissan Z NISMO GT500	GT500	OKA; 5	FUJ; 15	SUZ; 1	FUJ; 12	SUZ; 4	SUG; 1	AUT; 7	MOT; 4		2nd	66
2023	NDDP Racing	Nissan Z NISMO GT500	GT500	OKA; 2	FUJ; 5	SUZ; 4	FUJ; 1	SUZ; 12	SUG; 9	AUT; 3	**MOT**; 13		2nd	63
2024	NISMO NDDP	Nissan Z NISMO GT500	GT500	OKA; 6	FUJ; 1^{2}	SUZ; 8	FUJ; 12	SUZ; 6	SUG; 3	AUT; 7	MOT; 7		3rd	54
2025	NISMO	Nissan Z NISMO GT500	GT500	OKA; 6	FUJ; 8	SEP; 13	FS1; 11	FS2 (9)	SUZ; 1	SUG; 13	AUT; 6	MOT; 2	6th	49
2026	NISMO	Nissan Z NISMO GT500	GT500	OKA; 8	FUJ; 3	FUJ; Ret	SUZ; 4	SUG; 8	AUT; 3	MOT; 7	MOT; 11		9th	40

^{‡} Half points awarded as less than 75% of race distance was completed.
^{(Number)} Driver did not take part in this sprint race, points are still awarded for the teammate's result.
^{*} Season still in progress.

=== Complete Super Formula Lights Championship Results ===
(key) (Races in bold indicate pole position) (Races in italics indicate fastest lap)

Year	Team	1	2	3	4	5	6	7	8	9	10	11	12	13	14	15	16	17	Rank	Points
2020	B-Max Racing Team	MOT; 1; 5	MOT; 2; 4	MOT; 3; 4	OKA; 1	OKA; 2	SUG; 1	SUG; 2	SUG; 3	AUT; 1	AUT; 2	AUT; 3	SUZ; 1	SUZ; 2	SUZ; 3	FSW; 1	FSW; 2	FSW; 3	7th	8

=== Complete Super Formula results ===
(key) (Races in bold indicate pole position) (Races in italics indicate fastest lap)

Year	Team	Engine	1	2	3	4	5	6	7	8	9	10	11	12	DC	Points
2020	Buzz Racing with B-Max	Honda	MOT	OKA; 14	SUG	AUT	SUZ	SUZ	FUJ						26th	0
2021	Carenex Team Impul	Toyota	FUJ	SUZ1	AUT	SUG; 11	MOT1	MOT2	SUZ2						21st	0
2025	Itochu Enex Wecars Team Impul	Toyota	SUZ; 12	SUZ; 20	MOT; 15	MOT; 19	AUT; 11	FUJ; 17	FUJ; 14	SUG; 11	FUJ; 16	SUZ; 18	SUZ; 19	SUZ; 13	19th	0

Sporting positions
Preceded by Kenta Yamashita	Japanese Formula 3 Championship; Champion; 2017	Succeeded by Sho Tsuboi
