= 2022 Formula Regional Japanese Championship =

Motor racing competition

The 2022 Formula Regional Japanese Championship was a multi-event, Formula Regional open-wheel single seater motor racing championship held in Japan. The drivers competed in Formula Regional cars that conform to the FIA Formula Regional regulations for the championship. This was the third season of the series, promoted by New Pacific Sports Marketing Inc., and the 44th overall season of an FIA ladder series (dating to the 1979 Japanese Formula 3 Championship).

The season started on 2 April at Fuji Speedway and ran over six weekends, until 11 December. Miki Koyama won the championship with three races to spare, becoming the first female driver to win an FIA-sanctioned Formula championship. Her team, Super License, won the teams' title. Gentleman driver "Hirobon", driving for Rn-sports, won the Masters' class.

== Teams and drivers ==
All teams and drivers competed using the Dome F111/3 Regional F3 car. All teams were Japanese-registered.

Team	No.	Driver	Status	Rounds
Sutekina Racing Team	3	(Japan) Ryunosuke Sawa		1
Sutekina Racing Team	3	(Japan) Riki Okusa		4–5
B-Max Racing Team	4	(Japan) Nobuhiro Imada	M	1, 6
Team LeMans with OIRC	6	(Japan) Yoshiaki Katayama		1–5
Super License	7	(Japan) Takashi Hata	M	2–6
Super License	8	(Japan) Miki Koyama		All
Rn-sports	11	(Japan) "Hirobon"	M	1–5
Rn-sports	11	(Japan) Masayuki Ueda	M	6
Rn-sports	78	(Japan) Motoki Takami	M	6
Eagle Sports	14	(Japan) Yuki Tanaka	M	All
Eagle Sports	29	(Japan) Yasushi Ide	M	5
NILZZ Racing	18	(Japan) "Yuki"	M	5
N-SPEED	23	(Japan) "Yugo"	M	5
CMS motor sports project	34	(Japan) Masaru Miura	M	All
TOM'S Formula	45	(Japan) Yorikatsu Tsujiko	M	1–2, 5
TOM'S Formula	45	(Japan) Kazuki Oki		3–4, 6
Bionic Jack Racing	97	(Japan) Sota Ogawa		All

Icon	Class
M	Masters' Cup.

- Gentleman driver "Takumi" was supposed to compete for B-Max, but did not attend any rounds.

== Race calendar and results ==
A provisional calendar for the 2022 season was revealed on 25 November 2021, and was later revised to conclude in December.

Round		Circuit	Date	Pole position	Fastest lap	Winning driver	Winning team	Masters Winner
1	R1	Fuji Speedway	2 April	(Japan) Ryunosuke Sawa	(Japan) Ryunosuke Sawa	(Japan) Ryunosuke Sawa	Sutekina Racing Team	(Japan) "Hirobon"
1	R2	Fuji Speedway	3 April	(Japan) Ryunosuke Sawa	(Japan) Ryunosuke Sawa	(Japan) Ryunosuke Sawa	Sutekina Racing Team	(Japan) "Hirobon"
1	R3	Fuji Speedway	3 April	(Japan) Ryunosuke Sawa	(Japan) Ryunosuke Sawa	(Japan) Ryunosuke Sawa	Sutekina Racing Team	(Japan) "Hirobon"
2	R4	Okayama International Circuit	25 June	(Japan) Yoshiaki Katayama	(Japan) Yoshiaki Katayama	(Japan) Yoshiaki Katayama	Team LeMans with OIRC	(Japan) "Hirobon"
2	R5	Okayama International Circuit	26 June	(Japan) Yoshiaki Katayama	(Japan) Miki Koyama	(Japan) Miki Koyama	Super License	(Japan) Yuki Tanaka
2	R6	Okayama International Circuit	26 June	(Japan) Yoshiaki Katayama	(Japan) Miki Koyama	(Japan) Miki Koyama	Super License	(Japan) Takashi Hata
3	R7	Twin Ring Motegi	2 July	(Japan) Miki Koyama	(Japan) Miki Koyama	(Japan) Miki Koyama	Super License	(Japan) Yuki Tanaka
3	R8	Twin Ring Motegi	2 July	(Japan) Miki Koyama	(Japan) Miki Koyama	(Japan) Miki Koyama	Super License	(Japan) Masaru Miura
3	R9	Twin Ring Motegi	3 July	(Japan) Miki Koyama	(Japan) Miki Koyama	(Japan) Miki Koyama	Super License	(Japan) Takashi Hata
4	R10	Sportsland Sugo	23 July	(Japan) Sota Ogawa	(Japan) Miki Koyama	(Japan) Sota Ogawa	Bionic Jack Racing	(Japan) "Hirobon"
4	R11	Sportsland Sugo	24 July	(Japan) Kazuki Oki	(Japan) Sota Ogawa	(Japan) Kazuki Oki	TOM'S Formula	(Japan) Takashi Hata
4	R12	Sportsland Sugo	24 July	(Japan) Miki Koyama	(Japan) Riki Okusa	(Japan) Miki Koyama	Super License	(Japan) "Hirobon"
5	R13	Fuji Speedway	10 September	(Japan) Miki Koyama	(Japan) Yoshiaki Katayama	(Japan) Riki Okusa	Sutekina Racing Team	(Japan) "Hirobon"
5	R14	Fuji Speedway	10 September	(Japan) Riki Okusa	(Japan) Miki Koyama	(Japan) Miki Koyama	Super License	(Japan) Takashi Hata
5	R15	Fuji Speedway	11 September	(Japan) Riki Okusa	(Japan) Miki Koyama	(Japan) Sota Ogawa	Bionic Jack Racing	(Japan) "Hirobon"
6	R16	Suzuka International Racing Course	10 December	(Japan) Kazuki Oki	(Japan) Sota Ogawa	(Japan) Sota Ogawa	Bionic Jack Racing	(Japan) Takashi Hata
6	R17	Suzuka International Racing Course	11 December	(Japan) Sota Ogawa	(Japan) Kazuki Oki	(Japan) Kazuki Oki	TOM'S Formula	(Japan) Takashi Hata

== Season summary ==
=== First half ===
The 2022 season began in early April with nine cars at Fuji Speedway. Ryunosuke Sawa headed both qualifying sessions by half a second. Race one saw his closest opposition, front row starter Sota Ogawa, stall and drop back, leaving Sawa to claim the win ahead of Miki Koyama and Yoshiaki Katayama. The second race was held in wet conditions and was started under the safety car. Ogawa spun around during the safety car, and then multiple drivers had similar incidents as soon as the safety car was over. Sawa though held on to win again, with the rest of the podium the same as in race one. Race three did not offer much change: Sawa was once again the class of the field, gapping Ogawa and Koyama by over 20 seconds. His perfect weekend saw Sawa leave Fuji with a 24-point championship lead over Koyama.

Round two was held in Okayama, and this time Katayama was on top in qualifying. Race one saw Katayama turning his pole into a win ahead of Koyama and Ogawa, who had a slow start and ran into the gravel at turn one. This dropped him to seventh place, but he was able to recover to the podium. Koyama got a good start next to Katayama for race two, and so was able to overtake him into turn one. Katayama then also lost second place to Ogawa, but kept third place in the end. Race three saw Katayama have a slow start again, with Koyama and Ogawa benefitting from it again. The top three were the same as in race two. With Sawa dropping out of the championship, Koyama became the new leader in the standings, heading Katayama by 19 points. Ogawa was a further ten points behind in third.

The first half of the season came to an end at Motegi, where Koyama became the third triple-polesitter in as many rounds. She held the lead against Katayama and Ogawa in race one and kept them behind again when a safety car bunched up the field later on. Race two saw only four drivers reach the finish, as "Hirobon" did not start and Katayama collided with Takashi Hata and Yuki Tanaka. Koyama stayed clear of any incidents, winning again, ahead of debutant Kazuki Oki and gentleman driver Masaru Miura. The last race was a calmer affair, with Koyama once again converting pole into an unchallenged victory ahead of Ogawa and Katayama. Her perfect weekend saw her championship advantage grow to 59 points over Ogawa and Katayama, with the pair now neck on neck on 135 and 133 points respectively.

=== Second half ===
Round four at Sportsland Sugo saw Ogawa, Oki and Koyama share poles in qualifying. Ogawa led race one from pole as Oki passed Koyama for second. The latter was promoted back to second when Oki then had to serve a drive-through penalty, but could not get back past Ogawa. The podium was completed by gentleman driver "Hirobon". Oki made the most of his race two pole, gapping Koyama and Ogawa at the start. Ogawa then overtook Koyama and closed up to Oki, but had to retire his car after fighting heavily for the lead. This promoted Katayama to the podium. Race three was controlled by Koyama who led from lights to flag, while Oki had a bad start that saw him get passed by Ogawa. Oki then dropped back further, allowing Riki Okusa to claim third. Koyama had the most consistent weekend of the top three, and so grew her advantage to 73 points.

The penultimate round of the season attracted 12 entries as it supported the 6 Hours of Fuji. The qualifying sessions were won by Koyama and Okusa, who then also got by Koyama at the start of race one. Koyama could not pass him, so she had to follow him home in second, with Katayama behind the pair. Race two saw another slow start by Koyama, she dropped back to third but was able to regain second place and then also take the lead from Okusa. The latter then struggled and dropped to third, behind Ogawa. Okusa had a technical problem on the first lap of race three, so he had to retire. This promoted Ogawa in the lead, which he held onto despite Koyama's best efforts to pass him. Katayama completed the podium. Koyama's race two victory saw her seal the championship title, with her lead now an unassailable 79 points ahead of the final round.

The final round at Suzuka came three months later, and Oki and Ogawa shared poles for the two races. Oki was unable to benefit from his pole position, as he dropped to fourth after a bad start. His efforts to climb back up the order were curtailed when he crashed out on lap two. Ogawa managed his lead until the finish, with Koyama behind him and gentleman driver Takashi Hata completing the podium. Race two saw Oki get revenge for his bad start, as he went right by Ogawa at the race start and led uncontested until the chequered flag. Koyama had a quiet race to finish her perfect streak of 17 podiums in 17 races. Ogawa's second place in the standings was never in danger, as Katayama did not take part in the final round. Entry numbers were back down to single digits, as the championship continued its struggle to attract more drivers for a third year round.

== Championship standings ==
=== Scoring system ===
Points were awarded to the top ten drivers.

Position	1st	2nd	3rd	4th	5th	6th	7th	8th	9th	10th
Points	25	18	15	12	10	8	6	4	2	1

=== Drivers' championship ===
Pos	Driver	FUJ1			OKA			MOT			SUG			FUJ2			SUZ		Pts
Pos	Driver	R1	R2	R3	R4	R5	R6	R7	R8	R9	R10	R11	R12	R13	R14	R15	R16	R17	Pts
1	(Japan) Miki Koyama	2	2	3	2	1	1	1	1	1	2	2	1	2	1	2	2	3	349
2	(Japan) Sota Ogawa	4	4	2	3	2	3	3	4	2	1	8†	2	4	2	1	1	2	280
3	(Japan) Yoshiaki Katayama	3	3	4	1	3	2	2	Ret	3	4	3	4	3	5	3			212
4	(Japan) Takashi Hata				6	6	4	6	Ret	5	5	4	6	6	4	6	3	4	131
5	(Japan) "Hirobon"	5	5	5	4	5	6	7†	DNS	Ret	3	6	5	5	6	4			129
6	(Japan) Masaru Miura	7	7	8	5	7	7	Ret	3	6	7	7	8	7	8	7	5	7	109
7	(Japan) Kazuki Oki							4	2	4	8	1	7				Ret	1	102
8	(Japan) Yuki Tanaka	6	8	6	DNS	4	5	5	Ret	7	9	5	9	NC	7	5	7	9	96
9	(Japan) Ryunosuke Sawa	1	1	1															75
10	(Japan) Riki Okusa										6	Ret	3	1	3	Ret			63
11	(Japan) Nobuhiro Imada	8	6	7													4	5	40
12	(Japan) Yorikatsu Tsujiko	9	9†	9	7	Ret	8							10	9	8			23
13	(Japan) Masayuki Ueda																6	6	16
14	(Japan) Motoki Takami																8	8	8
15	(Japan) "Yuki"													8	10	10			6
16	(Japan) Yasushi Ide													9	11	9			4
17	(Japan) "Yugo"													11	12	11			0
Pos	Driver	R1	R2	R3	R4	R5	R6	R7	R8	R9	R10	R11	R12	R13	R14	R15	R16	R17	Pts
Pos	Driver	FUJ1			OKA			MOT			SUG			FUJ2			SUZ		Pts

=== Masters class ===
Pos	Driver	FUJ1			OKA			MOT			SUG			FUJ2			SUZ		Pts
Pos	Driver	R1	R2	R3	R4	R5	R6	R7	R8	R9	R10	R11	R12	R13	R14	R15	R16	R17	Pts
1	(Japan) "Hirobon"	1	1	1	1	2	3	3†	DNS	Ret	1	3	1	1	2	1			281
2	(Japan) Takashi Hata				3	3	1	2	Ret	1	2	1	2	2	1	3	1	1	267
3	(Japan) Masaru Miura	3	3	4	2	4	4	Ret	1	2	3	4	3	3	4	4	3	4	235
4	(Japan) Yuki Tanaka	2	4	2	DNS	1	2	1	Ret	3	4	2	4	NC	3	2	5	6	216
5	(Japan) Nobuhiro Imada	4	2	3													2	2	81
6	(Japan) Yorikatsu Tsujiko	5	5†	5	4	Ret	5							6	5	5			80
7	(Japan) Masayuki Ueda																4	3	27
8	(Japan) "Yuki"													4	6	7			26
9	(Japan) Yasushi Ide													5	7	6			24
10	(Japan) Motoki Takami																6	5	18
11	(Japan) "Yugo"													7	8	8			14
Pos	Driver	R1	R2	R3	R4	R5	R6	R7	R8	R9	R10	R11	R12	R13	R14	R15	R16	R17	Pts
Pos	Driver	FUJ1			OKA			MOT			SUG			FUJ2			SUZ		Pts

=== Teams' standings ===
Only the best finishing driver of each team was eligible for teams' championship points.

Pos	Driver	FUJ1			OKA			MOT			SUG			FUJ2			SUZ		Pts
Pos	Driver	R1	R2	R3	R4	R5	R6	R7	R8	R9	R10	R11	R12	R13	R14	R15	R16	R17	Pts
1	Super License	2	2	3	2	1	1	1	1	1	2	2	1	2	1	2	2	3	349
2	Bionic Jack Racing	4	4	2	3	2	3	3	4	2	1	8†	2	4	2	1	1	2	280
3	Team LeMans with OIRC	3	3	4	1	3	2	2	Ret	3	4	3	4	3	5	3			212
4	Rn-sports	5	5	5	4	5	6	7†	DNS	Ret	3	6	5	5	6	4	6	6	145
5	Sutekina Racing Team	1	1	1							6	Ret	3	1	3	Ret			138
6	TOM'S Formula	9	9†	9	7	Ret	8	4	2	4	8	1	7	10	9	8	Ret	1	125
7	CMS motor sports project	7	7	8	5	7	7	Ret	3	6	7	7	8	7	8	7	5	7	109
8	Eagle Sports	6	8	6	DNS	4	5	5	Ret	7	9	5	9	9	7	5	7	Ret	96
9	B-Max Racing Team	8	6	7													4	5	40
10	NILZZ Racing													8	10	10			6
11	N-SPEED													11	12	11			0
Pos	Driver	R1	R2	R3	R4	R5	R6	R7	R8	R9	R10	R11	R12	R13	R14	R15	R16	R17	Pts
Pos	Driver	FUJ1			OKA			MOT			SUG			FUJ2			SUZ		Pts
