= 2022 Super Taikyu Series =

Japanese sports car racing season

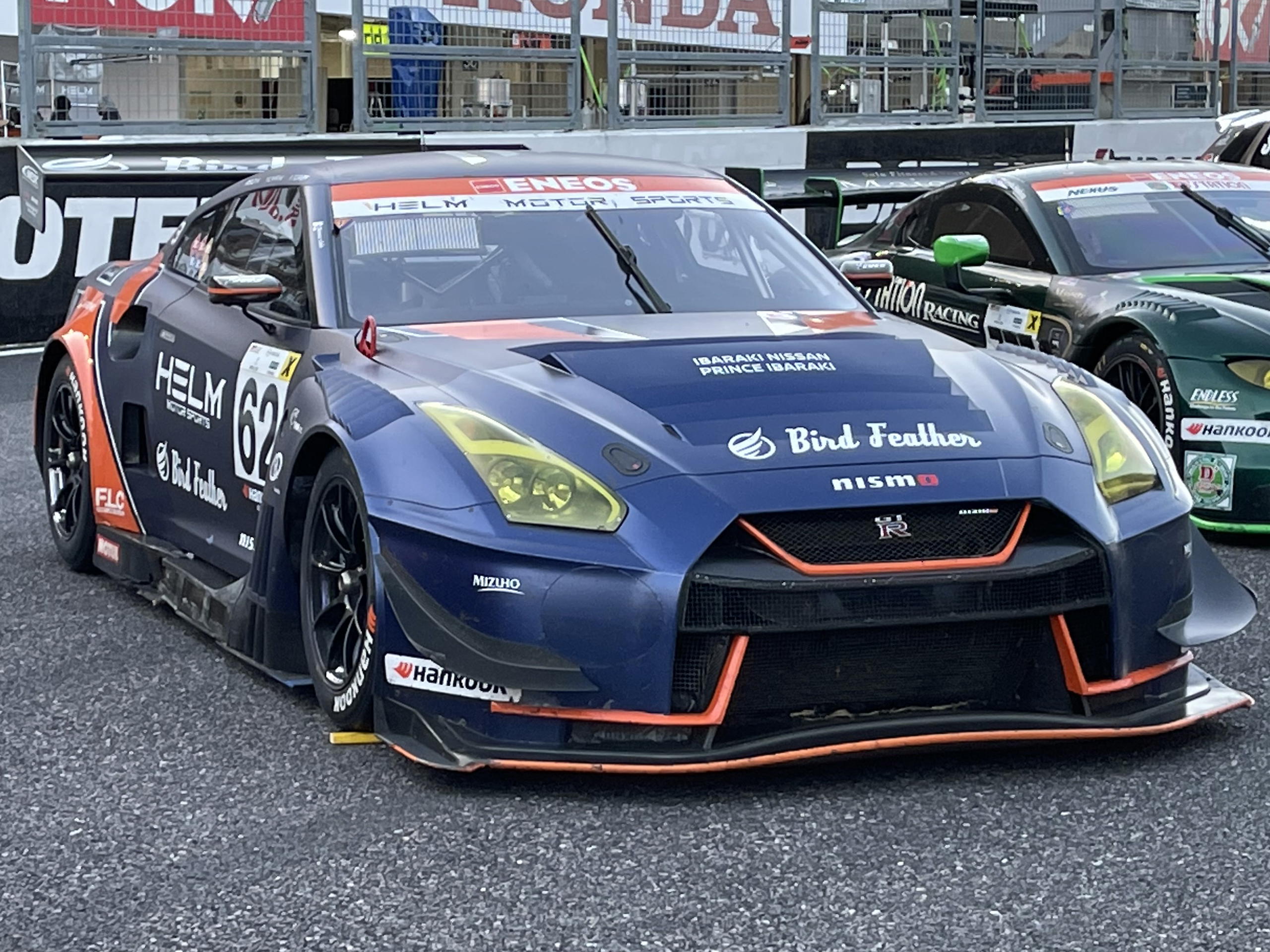
HELM Motorsports' Nissan GT-R NISMO GT3 won the ST-X class championship.

The 2022 Eneos Super Taikyu Series Powered by Hankook was the thirty-second season of the Super Taikyu Series endurance racing championship. The season started on 20 March and ended on 27 November at Suzuka Circuit.

HELM Motorsports won the championship in the series' GT3 category, known as ST-X, in its first year in the category with a Nissan GT-R NISMO GT3.

Eneos became the series' title sponsor in a multi-year agreement announced before the start of the season. In the ST-Q class, Toyota and Subaru debuted versions of their new Toyota GR86 and Subaru BRZ sports cars, adapted to run on carbon-neutral fuel. Nissan also debuted a racing concept version of the new Nissan Z, which served as the prototype to the Nissan Z GT4.

== Calendar ==
The Super Taikyu Series announced their 2022 calendar on 14 November 2021. The calendar featured a seventh round at Suzuka Circuit on 27 November which served as the season finale. Suzuka would also host the opening round on 20 March, while the newly rechristened Mobility Resort Motegi had its date moved to September. The double-header round at Sportsland Sugo was moved from April to early July, in between the Fuji Super TEC 24 Hours and the Autopolis round.

Round	Event	Race Length	Race Format	Classes	Circuit	Date
1	Suzuka Super Taikyu 5 Hour Race	5 hours	1 race	ST-X / Z / TCR / Q / 1 / 2 / 3 / 5	Suzuka Circuit	19–20 March
2	NAPAC Fuji SUPER TEC 24 Hours Race	24 hours	1 race	All	Fuji Speedway	3–5 June
3	SUGO Super Taikyu 3 Hours Race	3 hours	2 races	ST-X / Z / TCR / Q / 1 / 3 / 4 / 5	Sportsland Sugo	9–10 July
4	Super Taikyu Race in Autopolis	5 hours	1 race	ST-X / Z / TCR / Q / 1 / 2 / 3 / 4	Autopolis	30–31 July
5	Motegi Super Taikyu 5 Hours Race	5 hours	1 race	ST-X / Z / TCR / Q / 1 / 2 / 4 / 5	Mobility Resort Motegi	3–4 September
6	Super Taikyu Race in Okayama	3 hours x 2	2 races	ST-X / Z / TCR / Q / 2 / 3 / 4 / 5	Okayama International Circuit	15–16 October
7	Suzuka 5 Hour Endurance Race	5 hours	1 race	All	Suzuka Circuit	26–27 November

== Teams and drivers ==
59 different cars entered throughout the course of the 2022 season. All teams competed under a Japanese license.

No.	Entrant	Vehicle	Engine	Drivers
ST-X (FIA GT3 homologated vehicles)
9	MP Racing (Rd. 2-4)	Nissan GT-R Nismo GT3	Nissan 3.8 L twin-turbocharged V6	(Japan) Joe Shindo (Japan) Yusaku Shibata (Japan) Masami Kageyama (Japan) Takuro Shinohara (Japan) Hiroshi Koizumi (Rd. 2) (Japan) Keiichi Inoue (Rd. 2)
16	Porsche Center Okazaki (Rd. 1, 3-7)	Porsche 911 GT3 R (991.2)	Porsche 4.0L Flat-6	(Japan) Hiroaki Nagai (Japan) Yuta Kamimura (Japan) Daisuke Ito
23	TKRI (Rd.1, 3-7)	Mercedes-AMG GT3 Evo	Mercedes-AMG M159 6.2 L V8	(Japan) Daisuke (Japan) Yuya Motojima (Japan) Yuhki Nakayama
31	apr	Lexus RC F GT3	Toyota 2UR 5.0 L V8	(Japan) Hideki Nagai (Japan) Koki Saga (Japan) Kazuto Kotaka (Japan) Hiroaki Nagai (Rd. 2) (Japan) Yuta Kamimura (Rd. 2)
62	HELM Motorsports	Nissan GT-R Nismo GT3	Nissan 3.8 L twin-turbocharged V6	(Japan) Yutaka Toriba (Japan) Yuya Hiraki (Japan) Reiji Hiraki (Hong Kong) Shaun Thong (Rd. 2)
81	GTNET Motor Sports	Nissan GT-R Nismo GT3	Nissan 3.8 L twin-turbocharged V6	(Japan) Noboyuki Oyagi (Japan) Takayuki Aoki (Japan) Kiyoto Fujinami (Japan) Natsu Sakaguchi (Rd. 1-3, 5, 7)
555	PLUS Racing (Rd. 4)	BMW M4 GT3	BMW S58B30T0 3.0 L Turbo I6	(Japan) Tomohide Yamaguchi (Japan) Seiji Ara (Japan) Yuya Sakamoto
777	D'station Racing (Rd. 4-7)	Aston Martin Vantage AMR GT3	Aston Martin 4.0 L Turbo V8	(Japan) Satoshi Hoshino (Japan) Tomonobu Fujii (Japan) Tsubasa Kondo
888	Grid Motorsport	Mercedes-AMG GT3 Evo	Mercedes-AMG M159 6.2 L V8	(Japan) Daisuke Yamawaki (Japan) Shinichi Takagi (Japan) Haruki Kurosawa (Rd. 1-4) (Australia) Martin Berry (Rd. 2-7) (Hong Kong) Shaun Thong (Rd. 5-7)
ST-Z (RACB GT4 homologated vehicles)
19	Birth Racing Project 【BRP】	Porsche 718 Cayman GT4 Clubsport MR	Porsche 4.0 L Flat-6	(Japan) Kenji Suzuki (Japan) Takeshi Suehiro (Japan) Koichi Okumura (Rd. 1-3) (Japan) Takahisa Ohno (Rd. 1-2) (Japan) Kohei Fukuda (Rd. 2-7) (Japan) Hirobon (Rd. 2) (Japan) Tatsuya Tanigawa (Rd. 4-7)
21	Audi Team Hitotsuyama (Rd. 2-5, 7)	Audi R8 LMS GT4	Audi 5.2 L V10	(Japan) Ritomo Miyata (Japan) Seiya Jin (Japan) Yuki Ano (Japan) Hideo Honda (Rd. 2) (Japan) Yuki Fujii (Rd. 2) (Japan) Masaki Ano (Rd. 3-5, 7)
22	Porsche Team EBI Waimarama (Rd. 1-5, 7)	Porsche 718 Cayman GT4 RS Clubsport	Porsche 4.0 L Flat-6	(Japan) Naoya Yamano (Japan) Riki Okusa (Japan) Kizuna (Rd. 1-5) (Japan) Katsumasa Chiyo (Rd. 1-5) (France) Giuliano Alesi (Rd. 2) (South Korea) Lee Jung Woo (Rd. 2)
33	Audi Driving Experience Japan (Rd. 6)	Audi R8 LMS GT4	Audi 5.2 L V10	(Japan) Hideki Nakahara (Japan) Ritomo Miyata (Japan) Seiya Jin (Japan) Shota Takegawa
34	Techno First (Rd. 1, 3-6)	Ginetta G55 GT4	Ford 3.7 L V6	(Japan) Hironobu Yasuda (Japan) Kazuki Oki (Japan) Yuki Tanaka (Rd. 1) (Japan) Masaki Kano (Rd. 3-5) (Japan) Naozumi Saka (Rd. 6) (Japan) Ryosuke Ogawa (Rd. 6)
111	Hiroshima Toyopet Racing (Rd. 1, 3-7)	Toyota GR Supra GT4	BMW B58B30 3.0 L Twin-Turbo I6	(Japan) Toshiyuki Matsuda (Japan) Yuga Furutani (Japan) Yoshiaki Nakamura (Japan) Yasutaka Hinoi (Rd. 1, 3-6)
310	Corolla Shin-Ibaraki CSIRacing (Rd. 1-5); My Cars CSIRacing (Rd. 6-7)	Toyota GR Supra GT4	BMW B58B30 3.0 L Twin-Turbo I6	(Japan) Manabu Yamazaki (Japan) Sho Tsuboi (Japan) Seita Nonaka (Japan) Shinya Hosokawa (Rd. 1-3, 5-6) (Japan) Takumi Sanada (Rd. 2) (Japan) Yuya Sakamoto (Rd. 2)
500	Team 5Zigen (Rd. 1-6)	Mercedes-AMG GT4	Mercedes-AMG M178 4.0 L V8	(Japan) Ryuichiro Otsuka (Japan) Kakunoshin Ohta (Japan) Toshihiro Kaneishi (Japan) Iori Kimura (Rd. 2)
505	Audi Team AS Sport (Rd. 2, 4, 6-7)	Audi R8 LMS GT4	Audi 5.2 L V10	(Japan) Takeshi Okamoto (Japan) Ryosuke Kagami (Japan) Shozo Tagahara (Japan) Takahiro Kimura (Rd. 2) (Japan) Genki Nishimura (Rd. 2) (Japan) Yoshinari Fujiwara (Rd. 2)
885	SHADE Racing	Toyota GR Supra GT4	BMW B58B30 3.0 L Twin-Turbo I6	(Japan) Hiro Hayashi (Japan) Eijiro Shimizu (Japan) Katsuyuki Hiranaka (Rd. 1-3, 5-7) (Japan) Morio Nitta (Rd. 2) (Japan) Yuhki Nakayama (Rd. 2) (Japan) Shinnosuke Yamada (Rd. 4)
ST-TCR (TCR homologated vehicles)
No.	Entrant	Vehicle		Drivers
75	Team Noah (Rd. 1-2, 4-5, 7)	Honda Civic Type R TCR (FK7)		(Japan) Yoshikazu Sobu (Japan) Toshiro Tsukada (Rd. 1-2, 4) (Japan) Shigetomo Shimono (Rd. 1, 7) (Japan) Shingo Wada (Rd. 1, 7) (Japan) Yuji Kiyotaki (Rd. 2, 4-5) (Japan) "J" Antonio (Rd. 2, 5, 7) (Japan) Yu Kanamaru (Rd. 2) (Japan) Koji Miura (Rd. 2) (Japan) Yasuhiro Ogushi (Rd. 4) (Japan) Kuniyuki Haga (Rd. 5)
97	M&K Honda Cars Okegawa Racing (Rd. 1-2, 4-5, 7)	Honda Civic Type R TCR (FK7)		(Japan) Mitsuhiro Endo (Japan) Shinji Nakano (Japan) Kazuma Nishimura (Rd. 1-2, 4-5) (Japan) Yusuke Mitsui (Rd. 1-2, 4, 7) (Japan) Syun Koide (Rd. 2)
ST-Q (development vehicles approved by the STO)
3	Endless Sports	Mercedes-AMG GT4		(Japan) Ryo Ogawa (Japan) Shintaro Kawabata (Japan) Togo Suganami (Rd. 1-2, 4-5, 7) (Japan) Riki Tanioka (Rd. 2-3, 5-7)
28	ORC ROOKIE Racing	Toyota GR86 CNF Concept (Rd. 1-2, 4-7)		(Japan) Naoya Gamou (Japan) Daisuke Toyoda (Japan) Kazuya Oshima (Rd. 1-2, 4-5, 7) (Japan) Ryuta Ukai (Rd. 1-2, 4, 6-7) (Japan) Yuhi Sekiguchi (Rd. 2)
32	ORC ROOKIE Racing	Toyota Corolla Sport H2 Concept (Rd. 1-2); Toyota GR Corolla H2 Concept (Rd. 3-7)		(Japan) Masahiro Sasaki (Japan) Morizo (Japan) Yasuhiro Ogura (Japan) Hiroaki Ishiura (Rd. 1-2, 4-7) (Finland) Jari-Matti Latvala (Rd. 2) (Japan) Norihiko Katsuta (Rd. 2)
55	Mazda Spirit Racing	Mazda2 Bio Concept (Rd. 1-6); Mazda3 Bio Concept (Rd. 7)		(Japan) Kazuhiro Terakawa (Japan) Kaoru Ijiri (Japan) Yutaka Seki (Japan) Ikuo Maeda (Rd. 1-5, 7) (Japan) Tetsuya Kato (Rd. 2) (Japan) Yuya Tezuka (Rd. 2)
61	Team SDA Engineering	Subaru BRZ CNF Concept		(Japan) Takuto Iguchi (Japan) Hideki Yamauchi (Japan) Koichi Hirota (Japan) Takuma Kamada (Rd. 2) (Japan) Toshihiro Yoshida (Rd. 2)
230	NISMO (Rd. 2)	Nissan Z Racing Concept		(Japan) Kohei Hirate (Japan) Tsugio Matsuda (Italy) Ronnie Quintarelli (Japan) Daiki Sasaki (Japan) Kazuki Hoshino
244	Max Racing (Rd. 2-7)	Nissan Z Racing Concept		(Japan) Toru Tanaka (Japan) Atsushi Miyake (Japan) Tetsuya Tanaka (Rd. 2-4, 6-7) (Japan) Mitsunori Takaboshi (Rd. 2) (Japan) Hironobu Yasuda (Rd. 2) (Japan) Teppei Natori (Rd. 5)
ST-1 - Rounds 1-5, 7
2	K's Frontier KTM Cars	KTM X-Bow GTX		(Japan) Taiyo Ida (Japan) Kazuho Takahashi (Japan) Hiroki Katoh (Japan) Hiroki Yoshimoto (Japan) Takashi Kobayashi (Rd. 2)
8	BMW Team Studie (Rd. 2)	BMW M2 CS Racing		(Japan) Takayuki Kinoshita (Japan) Jukuchou Sunako (Japan) Takashi Ohi (Japan) Kouki Yamada (Japan) Takashi Kochiya
38	Tracy Sports	Toyota GR Supra (DB42)		(Japan) Yuui Tsutsumi (Japan) Yuichi Nakayama (Japan) Kota Matsui (Japan) Rintaro Kubo (Rd. 2)
47	D'station Racing	Aston Martin Vantage GT8R		(Japan) Manabu Orido (Japan) Kenji Hama (Japan) Tatsuya Hoshino (Rd. 1, 4) (Australia) Jake Parsons (Rd. 2, 4-5, 7) (Japan) Tsubasa Kondo (Rd. 2) (Japan) Kosuke Matsuura (Rd. 2)
ST-2 (2,401-3,500cc, front-wheel and all-wheel drive) - Rounds 1-2, 4-7
6	Shinryo Racing Team	Mitsubishi Lancer Evolution X (CZ4A)		(Japan) Tomohiro Tomimasu (Japan) Yasushi Kikuchi (Japan) Masazumi Ohashi (Japan) Turbo Asahi (Rd. 2)
7	Shinryo Racing Team	Mitsubishi Lancer Evolution X (CZ4A)		(Japan) Yoshiki Fujii (Japan) Mamoru Okada (Japan) Keisuke Anzai (Japan) Masato Narisawa (Rd. 1-2, 4-5, 7) (Japan) Takuya Shiga (Rd. 2) (Japan) Shingo Imai (Rd. 2)
13	Endless Sports	Toyota GR Yaris (GXPA16)		(Japan) Reimei Ito (Japan) Mizuki Ishizaka (Japan) Masaya Hanazato (Japan) Hitoshi Okada (Rd. 2, 5-7)
56	Claris Racing (Rd. 1-2, 4-5)	Toyota GR Yaris (GXPA16)		(Japan) Kizuku Hirota (Japan) Ryo Yamada (Rd. 1-2, 4) (Japan) Anna Inotsume (Rd. 1-2, 4) (Japan) Tatsuya Ota (Rd. 1-2, 5) (Japan) Riku Hashimoto (Rd. 2, 4-5) (Japan) Tomoki Iida (Rd. 2)
59	TOWAINTEC Racing	Subaru WRX STI (VAB)		(Japan) Manabu Osawa (Japan) Hitoshi Gotoh (Japan) Hideto Yasuoka (Japan) Shunsuke Sato (Rd. 2) (Japan) Yoshiyuki Tsuruga (Rd. 2)
225	KTMS Kobe Toyopet Motor Sports	Toyota GR Yaris (GXPA16)		(Japan) Hibiki Taira (Japan) Rin Arakawa (Japan) Jiei Okuzumi
743	Honda R&D Challenge	Honda Civic Type R (FK8) (Rd. 1-6); Honda Civic Type R (FL5) (Rd. 7)		(Japan) Hiroaki Ishigaki (Japan) Junichi Kidachi (Japan) Hideki Kakinuma (Japan) Kengo Yamamoto (Rd. 1-2, 4-5) (Japan) Shinichi Katsura (Rd. 2) (Japan) Tomoko Fujishima (Rd. 2) (Japan) Hideki Mutoh (Rd. 7)
ST-3 (2,401-3,500cc, rear-wheel drive) - Rounds 1-4, 6-7
15	Okabe Jidosha Motorsport	Nissan Fairlady Z (Z34)		(Japan) Masaaki Nagashima (Japan) Kazuomi Komatsu (Japan) Aruga Tomita (Japan) Yuga Katsumata (Rd. 1-3) (Japan) Seiya Motojima (Rd. 2, 4, 6-7) (Japan) Masaya Kohno (Rd. 2)
25	Team ZeroOne	Nissan Fairlady Z (Z34)		(Japan) Teppei Natori (Japan) Takuya Shirasaka (Japan) Ryuichiro Tomita (Rd. 1, 3, 6-7) (Japan) Tsubasa Mekaru (Rd. 2) (Japan) Yuya Nakajima (Rd. 2) (Japan) Masataka Inoue (Rd. 2) (Japan) Kimiya Sato (Rd. 4, 7)
39	Tracy Sports with Delta	Lexus RC 350 (GSC10)		(Japan) Yusuke Tomibayashi (Japan) Takashi Ito (Japan) Hirotaka Ishii (Japan) Takuya Otaki (Rd. 1-4) (Japan) Dai Mizuno (Rd. 2) (Japan) Gento Miyashita (Rd. 2)
52	Saitama Toyopet GreenBrave	Toyota Crown RS (ARS220)		(Japan) Naoki Hattori (Japan) Hiroki Yoshida (Japan) Kohta Kawaai (Japan) Hikaru Jitosho (Rd. 2)
63	Tracy Sports (Rd. 1-3, 6-7)	Lexus RC 350 (GSC10)		(Japan) Ryohei Sakaguchi (Japan) Makoto Hotta (Rd. 1-3) (Japan) Sena Sakaguchi (Rd. 2) (Japan) Rintaro Kubo (Rd. 6-7) (Japan) Dai Mizuno (Rd. 6-7)
311	FKS Team Fukushima (Rd. 1-4)	Nissan Fairlady Z (Z34)		(Japan) Yusuke Shiotsu (Japan) Ai Miura (Japan) Kazuki Hiramine (Japan) Tsugio Matsuda (Rd. 1, 3-4) (Japan) Kimiya Sato (Rd. 2) (Japan) Hirokazu Suzuki (Rd. 2)
ST-4 (1,500-2,400cc) - Rounds 2-7
18	Asano Racing Service	Toyota GR86 (ZN8)		(Japan) Takeo Asano (Japan) Daiki Fujiwara (Japan) Toshiki Ishimori (Japan) Takafumi Katsuki (Rd. 2, 4) (Japan) Toshikazu Shiba (Rd. 2) (Japan) Ryo Fukatsu (Rd. 2) (Japan) Tsuyoshi Ito (Rd. 5) (Japan) Shinnosuke Ito (Rd. 7)
60	Team G/Motion'	Honda Integra Type R (DC5) (Rd. 2-4); Toyota GR86 (ZN8) (Rd. 5-7)		(Japan) Takao Seto (Japan) Resshu Shioya (Japan) Taro Matsunami (Rd. 2) (Japan) Hikaru Nakamura (Rd. 2) (Japan) Piston Nishikawa (Rd. 5) (Japan) Kengo Yamamoto (Rd. 7)
86	TOM'S Spirit	Toyota GR86 (ZN8)		(Japan) Takamitsu Matsui (Japan) Kenta Yamashita (Japan) Shunsuke Kohno (Rd. 2-4, 6-7) (Japan) Ryuta Ukai (Rd. 5)
216	HMR Racing (Rd. 3, 5, 7)	Toyota 86 (ZN6)		(Japan) Kenji Ishikawa (Japan) Hammer Izawa (Rd. 2) (Japan) Yuki Kawahara (Rd. 5, 7) (Japan) Yuga Katsumata (Rd. 5) (Japan) Taku Ohsumi (Rd. 7)
884	SHADE Racing	Toyota 86 (ZN6) (Rd. 2); Toyota GR86 (ZN8) (Rd. 3-7)		(Japan) Keishi Ishikawa (Japan) Yuji Kunimoto (Japan) Shinnosuke Yamada (Rd. 2-3, 5-7) (Japan) Masahiko Kageyama (Rd. 2)
ST-5 (up to 1,500cc) - Rounds 1-3, 5-7
4	Team Bride	Honda Fit3 RS (GK5)		(Japan) Hiroshi Ito (Japan) Yuya Ohta (Rd. 1-3, 5, 7) (Japan) Hiroki Kokuzawa (Rd. 1-2, 5, 7) (Japan) Takuji Okada (Rd. 1-2, 6) (Japan) Rina Ito (Rd. 2, 5, 7) (Japan) Soichi Kurosu (Rd. 2) (Japan) Seijiro Aihara (Rd. 3) (Japan) Hidefumi Minami (Rd. 6)
5	Team Bride	Toyota Yaris (MXPA10) (Rd. 3, 6)		(Japan) Hiroki Kokuzawa (Japan) Rina Ito (Japan) Hidefumi Minami (Rd. 5) (Japan) Shunsuke Sato (Rd. 5) (Japan) Carlos Honda (Rd. 6)
11	Ambitious Racing	Honda Fit3 RS (GK5)		(Japan) Masaki Baba (Japan) Katsuhiro Sato (Japan) Teppei Tsuruta (Japan) Hajime Omono (Rd. 2, 5) (Japan) Motoharu Sato (Rd. 2)
12	Mazda Spirit Racing (Rd. 5-7)	Mazda Roadster (ND5RC)		(Japan) Haruhiko Sugino (Japan) Noriyuki Higuchi (Japan) Ryohei Sakaguchi (Rd. 5) (Japan) Tomoko Fujishima (Rd. 5) (Japan) Ikuo Maeda (Rd. 6) (Japan) Yasutaka Hinoi (Rd. 7) (Japan) Teruaki Kato (Rd. 7)
17	Team NOPRO	Mazda Demio Diesel Turbo (DJ5FS)		(Japan) Kazunari Yoshioka (Japan) Tobio Ohtani (Japan) Yuya Tezuka (Rd. 1, 3, 5-7) (Japan) Yoshihiro Kato (Rd. 1) (Japan) Toshihiko Nogami (Rd. 2-3, 5-7) (Japan) Hideyoshi Nishizawa (Rd. 2) (Japan) Junichi Agematsu (Rd. 2) (Japan) Hiroaki Yamamoto (Rd. 2)
37	Team NOPRO	Mazda Demio (DE5FS)		(Japan) Tatsuya Nogami (Japan) Toshihiko Nogami (Rd. 1) (Japan) Yoshihiro Kato (Rd. 2-3, 5-7) (Japan) Shunsuke Ozaki (Rd. 2, 5-7) (Japan) Toshihiro Kubota (Rd. 2) (Japan) Tatsuya Tanigawa (Rd. 3) (Japan) Hiroaki Yamamoto (Rd. 5, 7)
50	Love Drive Racing	Mazda Roadster (ND5RC)		(Japan) Hiroyuki Matsumura (Japan) Koji Yamanishi (Rd. 1-3) (Japan) Yoshihito Shinoda (Rd. 1-2, 6-7) (Japan) Yuhi Sekiguchi (Rd. 1) (Japan) Junko Fujii (Rd. 2-3, 5-7) (Japan) Takashi Hata (Rd. 2) (Japan) Kotaro Matsubuchi (Rd. 2) (Japan) Hirobon (Rd. 3) (Japan) Isao Ihashi (Rd. 5-7)
65	Over Drive	Mazda Roadster (ND5RC)		(Japan) Shuichiro Hokazono (Japan) Eiji Niwa (Rd. 1-2, 5, 7) (Japan) Masahiro Aoai (Rd. 1-2, 6) (Japan) Ryohei Arioka (Rd. 1, 6) (Japan) Hirohito Ito (Rd. 2-3, 7) (Japan) Takaya Kusano (Rd. 2) (Japan) Koji Obara (Rd. 2) (Japan) Hiroki Wako (Rd. 3) (Japan) Tatsuya Ota (Rd. 3) (Japan) Ryota Kikuchi (Rd. 5) (Japan) Yoshihiro Murooka (Rd. 5) (Japan) Shunji Okumoto (Rd. 7)
66	Over Drive	Mazda Roadster (ND5RC)		(Japan) Takayuki Takechi (Japan) Kousei Kanto (Japan) Kyosuke Inomata (Japan) Daichi Okamoto (Rd. 1-2, 5, 7) (Japan) Yasuhiro Takasaki (Rd. 2) (Japan) Daitetsu Ueno (Rd. 2) (Japan) Yoshiyuki Uesugi (Rd. 3)
67	Team Yamato (Rd. 1-3, 5, 7)	Honda Fit3 RS (GK5)		(Japan) Ryohei Yasui (Japan) Shinya Uchiyama (Japan) Ryo Mukumoto (Rd. 1-3, 5) (Japan) Hideaki Ito (Rd. 2-3, 5, 7)
72	Nihon Automobile College	Mazda Roadster (ND5RC)		(Japan) Tetsuya Yamano (Japan) Makoto Kanai (Japan) Tatsuya Nojima (Japan) Tatsuya Ishii (Rd. 2) (Japan) Takumi Minamisawa (Rd. 2)
88	Murakami Motors	Mazda Roadster (ND5RC)		(Japan) Hiroyuki Murakami (Rd. 1-2, 5-7) (Japan) Masanobu Kato (Rd. 1-3, 5) (Japan) Tatsuya Tanigawa (Rd. 1-2) (Japan) Keiji Amemiya (Rd. 2-3, 5, 7) (Japan) Tatsuya Ota (Rd. 6-7) (Japan) Naoya Yamano (Rd. 6-7)
104	Hiroshima Mazda HMRacers	Mazda Demio (DJLFS)		(Japan) Soichiro Yoshida (Japan) Kota Sasaki (Japan) Tomomitsu Senoo (Japan) Ryunosuke Yoshida (Rd. 2, 5, 7) (Japan) Yugo Osaki (Rd. 2)
110	Hiroshima Toyopet Racing (Rd. 1-3, 7)	Toyota Vitz (NCP131)		(Japan) Hiroyuki Saka (Japan) Takao Onishi (Japan) Ryo Kuboguchi (Rd. 1) (Japan) Satoshi Matsubara (Rd. 1) (Japan) Sota Muto (Rd. 2-3) (Japan) Yuga Furutani (Rd. 2) (Japan) Yoshiaki Nakamura (Rd. 2) (Japan) Toshiyuki Matsuda (Rd. 2)
222	Honda Cars Tokai	Honda Fit3 RS (GK5)		(Japan) Toshiki Takeuchi (Japan) Masanori Tanaka (Japan) Masayuki Sumi (Japan) Hajime Saimen (Rd. 1-3, 5) (Japan) Masaki Nishihata (Rd. 2)
290	AutoLabo (Rd. 1-3, 6-7)	Toyota Yaris (MXPA10)		(Japan) Yuichi Yokoo (Japan) Satoshi Nitaka (Rd. 1-2) (Japan) Kohei Matsumoto (Rd. 1) (Japan) Kazunari Yoshimura (Rd. 1) (Japan) Takeshi Kitagawa (Rd. 2, 6-7) (Japan) Daisuke Ito (Rd. 2) (Japan) Naozumi Saka (Rd. 2) (Japan) Akira Kitagawa (Rd. 2) (Japan) Tatsuya Watanabe (Rd. 3, 6) (Japan) Atsuhito Otomo (Rd. 3, 7) (Japan) Kazuhisa Shimoyama (Rd. 7)

== Race results ==
Round	Circuit	Race	ST-X Winners	ST-Z Winners	ST-TCR Winners	ST-Q Winners	ST-1 Winners	ST-2 Winners	ST-3 Winners	ST-4 Winners	ST-5 Winners
1	Suzuka I		No.81 GTNET Motor Sports	No.885 SHADE Racing	No.75 Team Noah	No.3 Endless Sports	No.2 K's Frontier KTM Cars	No.225 Kobe Toyopet Motorsports	No.52 Saitama Toyopet GreenBrave	did not participate	No.72 Nihon Automobile College
1	Suzuka I		(Japan) Noboyuki Oyagi (Japan) Takayuki Aoki (Japan) Kiyoto Fujinami (Japan) Natsu Sakaguchi	(Japan) Hiro Hayashi (Japan) Katsuyuki Hiranaka (Japan) Eijiro Shimizu	(Japan) Toshiro Tsukada (Japan) Yoshikazu Sobu (Japan) Shigetomo Shimono (Japan) Shingo Wada	(Japan) Ryo Ogawa (Japan) Togo Suganami (Japan) Shintaro Kawabata	(Japan) Taiyo Ida (Japan) Hiroki Katoh (Japan) Kazuho Takahashi (Japan) Hiroki Yoshimoto	(Japan) Hibiki Taira (Japan) Rin Arakawa (Japan) Jiei Okuzumi	(Japan) Naoki Hattori (Japan) Hiroki Yoshida (Japan) Kohta Kawaai	did not participate	(Japan) Tetsuya Yamano (Japan) Makoto Kanai (Japan) Tatsuya Nojima
2	Fuji 24h		No.62 HELM Motorsports	No.500 Team 5Zigen	No.75 Team Noah	No.3 Endless Sports	No.2 K's Frontier KTM Cars	No.225 Kobe Toyopet Motorsports	No.52 Saitama Toyopet GreenBrave	No.86 TOM'S Spirit	No.17 Team NOPRO
2	Fuji 24h		(Japan) Yutaka Toriba (Japan) Yuya Hiraki (Japan) Reiji Hiraki (Hong Kong) Shaun Thong	(Japan) Ryuichiro Otsuka (Japan) Kakunoshin Ohta (Japan) Toshihiro Kaneishi (Japan) Iori Kimura	(Japan) Toshiro Tsukada (Japan) Yoshikazu Sobu (Japan) Yu Kanamaru (Japan) Koji Miura (Japan) "J" Antonio (Japan) Yuji Kiyotaki	(Japan) Ryo Ogawa (Japan) Togo Suganami (Japan) Shintaro Kawabata (Japan) Riki Tanioka	(Japan) Taiyo Ida (Japan) Hiroki Katoh (Japan) Kazuho Takahashi (Japan) Hiroki Yoshimoto (Japan) Takashi Kobayashi	(Japan) Hibiki Taira (Japan) Rin Arakawa (Japan) Jiei Okuzumi	(Japan) Naoki Hattori (Japan) Hiroki Yoshida (Japan) Kohta Kawaai (Japan) Hikaru Jitosho	(Japan) Shunsuke Kohno (Japan) Takamitsu Matsui (Japan) Kenta Yamashita	(Japan) Kazunari Yoshioka (Japan) Tobio Ohtani (Japan) Junichi Agematsu (Japan) Hideyoshi Nishizawa (Japan) Hiroaki Yamamoto (Japan) Toshihiko Nogami
3	Sugo	Group 1	No.888 Grid Motorsport	No.310 Corolla Shin-Ibaraki CSIRacing	did not participate	No.244 Max Racing	No.38 Tracy Sports	did not participate			
3	Sugo	Group 1	(Australia) Martin Berry (Japan) Shinichi Takagi (Japan) Haruki Kurosawa (Japan) Daisuke Yamawaki	(Japan) Manabu Yamazaki (Japan) Sho Tsuboi (Japan) Seita Nonaka (Japan) Shinya Hosokawa	did not participate	(Japan) Tetsuya Tanaka (Japan) Toru Tanaka (Japan) Atsushi Miyake	(Japan) Yuui Tsutsumi (Japan) Yuichi Nakayama (Japan) Kota Matsui	did not participate			
3	Sugo	Group 2	did not participate		did not participate	No.61 Team SDA Engineering	did not participate		No.39 Tracy Sports with Delta	No.86 TOM'S Spirit	No.72 Nihon Automobile College
3	Sugo	Group 2	did not participate		did not participate	(Japan) Takuto Iguchi (Japan) Hideki Yamauchi (Japan) Koichi Hirota	did not participate		(Japan) Yusuke Tomibayashi (Japan) Takashi Ito (Japan) Hirotaka Ishii (Japan) Takuya Otaki	(Japan) Shunsuke Kohno (Japan) Takamitsu Matsui (Japan) Kenta Yamashita	(Japan) Tetsuya Yamano (Japan) Makoto Kanai (Japan) Tatsuya Nojima
4	Autopolis		No.62 HELM Motorsports	No.500 Team 5Zigen	No.75 Team Noah	No.3 Endless Sports	No.47 D'station Racing	No.225 Kobe Toyopet Motorsports	No.52 Saitama Toyopet GreenBrave	No.86 TOM'S Spirit	did not participate
4	Autopolis		(Japan) Yutaka Toriba (Japan) Yuya Hiraki (Japan) Reiji Hiraki	(Japan) Ryuichiro Otsuka (Japan) Kakunoshin Ohta (Japan) Toshihiro Kaneishi	(Japan) Toshiro Tsukada (Japan) Yoshikazu Sobu (Japan) Yasuhiro Ogushi (Japan) Yuji Kiyotaki	(Japan) Ryo Ogawa (Japan) Togo Suganami (Japan) Shintaro Kawabata	(Japan) Tatsuya Hoshino (Japan) Manabu Orido (Japan) Kenji Hama (Australia) Jake Parsons	(Japan) Hibiki Taira (Japan) Rin Arakawa (Japan) Jiei Okuzumi	(Japan) Naoki Hattori (Japan) Hiroki Yoshida (Japan) Kohta Kawaai	(Japan) Shunsuke Kohno (Japan) Takamitsu Matsui (Japan) Kenta Yamashita	did not participate
5	Motegi		No.888 Grid Motorsport	No.34 Techno First	No.75 Team Noah	No.3 Endless Sports	No.47 D'station Racing	No.13 Endless Sports	did not participate	No.884 SHADE Racing	No.4 Team Bride
5	Motegi		(Australia) Martin Berry (Hong Kong) Shaun Thong (Japan) Shinichi Takagi (Japan) Daisuke Yamawaki	(Japan) Masaki Kano (Japan) Kazuki Oki (Japan) Hironobu Yasuda	(Japan) Yuji Kiyotaki (Japan) Yoshikazu Sobu (Japan) "J" Antonio (Japan) Kuniyuki Haga	(Japan) Ryo Ogawa (Japan) Togo Suganami (Japan) Shintaro Kawabata (Japan) Riki Tanioka	(Japan) Kenji Hama (Japan) Manabu Orido (Australia) Jake Parsons	(Japan) Reimei Ito (Japan) Mizuki Ishizaka (Japan) Masaya Hanazato (Japan) Hitoshi Okada	did not participate	(Japan) Keishi Ishikawa (Japan) Yuji Kunimoto (Japan) Shinnosuke Yamada	(Japan) Yuya Ohta (Japan) Hiroshi Ito (Japan) Hiroki Kokuzawa (Japan) Rina Ito
6	Okayama	Group 1	No.16 Porsche Center Okazaki	No.885 SHADE Racing	did not participate	No.3 Endless Sports	did not participate	No.225 Kobe Toyopet Motorsports	did not participate		
6	Okayama	Group 1	(Japan) Hiroaki Nagai (Japan) Yuta Kamimura (Japan) Daisuke Ito	(Japan) Hiro Hayashi (Japan) Katsuyuki Hiranaka (Japan) Eijiro Shimizu	did not participate	(Japan) Ryo Ogawa (Japan) Shintaro Kawabata (Japan) Riki Tanioka	did not participate	(Japan) Hibiki Taira (Japan) Rin Arakawa (Japan) Jiei Okuzumi	did not participate		
6	Okayama	Group 2	did not participate		did not participate	No.61 Team SDA Engineering	did not participate	did not participate	No.63 Tracy Sports	No.86 TOM'S Spirit	No.88 Murakami Motors
6	Okayama	Group 2	did not participate		did not participate	(Japan) Takuto Iguchi (Japan) Hideki Yamauchi (Japan) Koichi Hirota	did not participate	did not participate	(Japan) Ryohei Sakaguchi (Japan) Rintaro Kubo (Japan) Dai MIzuno	(Japan) Shunsuke Kohno (Japan) Takamitsu Matsui (Japan) Kenta Yamashita	(Japan) Hiroyuki Murakami (Japan) Tatsuya Ota (Japan) Naoki Yamaya
7	Suzuka II		No.16 Porsche Center Okazaki	No.22 Porsche Team EBI Waimarama	No.97 M&K Honda Cars Okegawa Racing	No.3 Endless Sports	No.2 K's Frontier KTM Cars	No.225 Kobe Toyopet Motorsports	No.63 Tracy Sports	No.86 TOM'S Spirit	No.4 Team Bride
7	Suzuka II		(Japan) Hiroaki Nagai (Japan) Yuta Kamimura (Japan) Daisuke Ito	(Japan) Naoya Yamano (Japan) Riki Okusa	(Japan) Mitsuhiro Endo (Japan) Shinji Nakano (Japan) Yusuke Mitsui	(Japan) Ryo Ogawa (Japan) Togo Suganami (Japan) Shintaro Kawabata (Japan) Riki Tanioka	(Japan) Taiyo Ida (Japan) Hiroki Katoh (Japan) Kazuho Takahashi (Japan) Hiroki Yoshimoto	(Japan) Hibiki Taira (Japan) Rin Arakawa (Japan) Jiei Okuzumi	(Japan) Ryohei Sakaguchi (Japan) Rintaro Kubo (Japan) Dai MIzuno	(Japan) Shunsuke Kohno (Japan) Takamitsu Matsui (Japan) Kenta Yamashita	(Japan) Yuya Ohta (Japan) Hiroshi Ito (Japan) Hiroki Kokuzawa (Japan) Rina Ito

== Championship standings ==
Championship points are awarded in every class with the exception of ST-Q at the end of each event.

For the ST-X, ST-Z, and ST-TCR championships, each team's six highest scoring rounds are validated in the final championship standings.

Points systems
Duration	1st	2nd	3rd	4th	5th	6th	7th	8th	9th	10th	≤11th	Pole
3 Hours / 500km	20	15	12	10	8	6	4	3	2	1	0	2
5 Hours / 700km	30	22.5	18	15	12	9	6	4.5	3	1.5	1	2
≥12 Hours / 1400km	45	35	27	23	18	13	9	7	5	3	1	2

=== Teams' Championship standings ===
Pos.	Car	Team	SUZ	FSW	SUG	AUT	MRM	OIC	SUZ	Total
ST-X
1	62	HELM Motorsports	5	1	7	1	4	5	**2**	134.5
2	888	Grid Motorsport	4	**2**	1	8	1	4	4	127
3	16	Porsche Center Okazaki	**Ret**		**2**	**3**	**3**	**1**	1	111
4	81	GTNET Motor Sports	1	3	6	7	2	NC	7	97.5
5	23	TKRI	2		4	5	6	2	3	86.5
6	31	apr	3	4	3	Ret	5	6	5	83
7	777	D'station Racing				2	7	3	6	49.5
8	9	MP Racing		5	5	6				35
9	555	PLUS Racing				4				15
ST-Z
1	500	Team 5Zigen	**3**	**1**	**Ret**	1	2	4		131.5
2	885	SHADE Racing	1	2	6	Ret	8	**1**	3	115.5
3	310	My Cars CSIRacing	2	6	1	7	**4**	3	2	107
4	19	Birth Racing Project	7	4	4	2	5	6	4	88.5
5	22	Porsche Team EBI Waimarama	4	Ret	2	5	7		**1**	80
6	111	Hiroshima Toyopet Racing	5		3	3	6	2	5	78
7	21	Audi Team Hitotsuyama		3	5	4	3		6	77
8	34	Techno First	6		7	**Ret**	1	5		53
9	505	Audi Team AS Sport		5		6		7	7	37
10	33	Audi Driving Experience Japan						8		3
ST-TCR
1	75	Team Noah	**1**	**1**		1	1		Ret	139
2	97	M&K Honda Cars Okegawa Racing		2		**2**	**2**		**1**	116
ST-1
1	2	K's Frontier KTM Cars	1	**1**	2	2	3		**1**	164.5
2	47	D'station Racing	**3**	2	3	1	**1**		2	151.5
3	38	Tracy Sports	2	4	**1**	**3**	2		3	128
4	8	BMW Team Studie		3						27
ST-2
1	225	KTMS Kobe Toyopet Motor Sports	1	1		1	3	1	1	173
2	13	Endless Sports	2	2		2	1	2	4	140
3	6	Shinryo Racing Team	**Ret**	**5**		**3**	**2**	**3**	5	92.5
4	743	Honda R&D Challenge	5	4		6	4	5	2	89.5
5	59	TOWAINTEC Racing	3	3		4	Ret	4	3	88
6	7	Shinryo Racing Team	4	Ret		5	Ret	Ret	**Ret**	29
7	56	Claris Racing	6	Ret		7	5			27
ST-3
1	39	Tracy Sports with Delta	**2**	2	1	2		3	2	136.5
2	52	Saitama Toyopet GreenBrave	1	**1**	4	**1**		2	Ret	134
3	63	Tracy Sports	5	3	6			**1**	**1**	99
4	311	FKS Team Fukushima	3	4	**2**	3				76
5	25	Team ZeroOne	6	NC	3	Ret		4	3	49
6	15	Okabe Jidosha Motorsport	4	5	5	NC		Ret	Ret	41
ST-4
1	86	TOM'S Spirit		**1**	**1**	**1**	2	**1**	**1**	177.5
2	884	SHADE Racing		2	2	2	**1**	2	2	142
3	18	Asano Racing Service		4	3	3	3	3	4	98
4	60	Team G/Motion'		3	Ret	4	5	4	3	82
5	216	HMR Racing			4		4		Ret	25
ST-5
1	4	Team Bride	5	5	4		**1**	3	1	114
2	17	Team NOPRO	3	1	3		9	7	3	100
3	66	Over Drive	2	3	2		Ret	4	2	97
4	72	Nihon Automobile College	**1**	12	**1**		2	2	Ret	92.5
5	104	Hiroshima Mazda HMRacers	4	2	5		3	13	5	88
6	88	Murakami Motors	6	4	7		5	**1**	8	74.5
7	65	Over Drive	11	7	6		11	5	**4**	42
8	11	Ambitious Racing	7	10	9		6	12	6	29
9	67	Team Yamato	Ret	9	Ret		4		7	26
10	50	Love Drive Racing	Ret	**6**	8		8	DNS	Ret	22.5
11	222	Honda Cars Tokai	9	8	11		7	6	Ret	22
12	110	Hiroshima Toyopet Racing	8	Ret	10				9	8.5
13	12	Mazda Spirit Racing					12	8	10	5.5
14	290	AutoLabo	10	11	13			9	Ret	4.5
15	37	Team NOPRO	NC	Ret	12		10	11	11	2.5
16	5	Team Bride			14			10		1
Pos.	Car	Team	SUZ	FSW	SUG	AUT	MRM	OIC	SUZ	Total

Colour	Result
Gold	Winner
Silver	Second place
Bronze	Third place
Green	Points classification
Blue	Non-points classification
Blue	Non-classified finish (NC)
Purple	Retired, not classified (Ret)
Red	Did not qualify (DNQ)
Red	Did not pre-qualify (DNPQ)
Black	Disqualified (DSQ)
White	Did not start (DNS)
White	Withdrew (WD)
White	Race cancelled (C)
Blank	Did not practice (DNP)
Blank	Did not arrive (DNA)
Blank	Excluded (EX)

**Bold** - Pole position

Italics - Fastest lap
