= 2020 Super GT Series =

Auto racing season

The 2020 Autobacs Super GT Series was motor racing championship based in Japan for grand touring cars. The series is sanctioned by the Japan Automobile Federation (JAF) and run by the GT Association (GTA). It was the twenty-eighth season of the Japan Automobile Federation Super GT Championship which includes the All Japan Grand Touring Car Championship (JGTC) era and the sixteenth season the series to compete under the Super GT name. It was the thirty-eighth overall season of a JAF national sportscar championship dating back to the All Japan Sports Prototype Championship.

Team Kunimitsu and drivers Naoki Yamamoto and Tadasuke Makino won the Drivers' and Teams' Championships in GT500 for Honda and their new NSX-GT with a front-engine layout. They clinched the championship in the final lap of the final race of the season, after championship rivals TGR Team KeePer TOM's and driver Ryo Hirakawa ran out of fuel at the final corner. Nissan customer racing team Kondo Racing and drivers Kiyoto Fujinami and João Paulo Lima de Oliveira won the GT300 class championships in the second-generation GT-R NISMO GT3.

== Schedule ==
=== Initial 2020 schedule ===
On July 26, 2019, the GTA announced the provisional calendar for the 2020 Super GT series, with the number of rounds remaining at 8, but with an increase in the number of overseas races, with the return of Chang International Circuit in Thailand, and for the first time since 2013 Super GT Series, a return to Sepang International Circuit, in Malaysia. Despite its absence in the calendar, Sepang had remained a popular choice for manufacturers when reviewing locations for testing, particularly during the winter months. At the time, dates for neither of the overseas rounds were revealed, although the races were expected to take place between June and August. The Fuji 500 mile round, introduced to replace the 1000 km of Suzuka, was dropped to avoid a clash with the 2020 Summer Olympics, which would be held in Tokyo. A finalised calendar with the dates for both overseas rounds was revealed during the 2019 Motegi GT 250 km weekend.

=== Impact of coronavirus pandemic ===
On March 18, 2020, the original opening round at Okayama International Circuit was postponed to an undetermined date due to the coronavirus pandemic. On March 30, 2020, the second and third rounds at Fuji Speedway and Suzuka Circuit were each postponed. On April 5, 2020, the series released its first revised calendar, which was scheduled to begin on July 12 at Okayama. With the 2020 Summer Olympics postponed, the Fuji Speedway round, traditionally scheduled for the Golden Week holiday of May 4, was moved to August 9.

On June 4, 2020, a second revision to the calendar was announced. The season was now scheduled to begin on July 19 at Fuji Speedway, the first of three confirmed races that were announced to be held at Fuji, with a fourth added later. Two rounds were scheduled to take place at Suzuka Circuit, with one scheduled for August 23, the date that was originally set for the cancelled 2020 Suzuka 10 Hours. Two rounds were scheduled to take place at Twin Ring Motegi. The rounds at Okayama International Circuit, Autopolis, and Sportsland Sugo in Japan, as well as the round at Sepang International Circuit in Malaysia, were all cancelled for 2020. On June 8, 2020, it was confirmed that the eighth and final round would take place at Fuji Speedway on November 29, after the round at Chang International Circuit in Thailand, which was provisionally scheduled to take place on December 27, was cancelled. The first event format was announced on June 29, with the first race at Fuji being held at a 300 kilometre distance.

This season saw a number of corporate sponsors purchasing naming rights for individual rounds. Oono Associates purchased naming rights for all four rounds held at Fuji Speedway, under their Takanokono Hotel property based in Matsuyama, Japan. Steel manufacturer Fujimaki Group purchased naming rights for the two rounds held at Suzuka Circuit and Twin Ring Motegi.

Round	Race	Circuit	Date
1	Takanokono Hotel Fuji GT 300 km Race	(Japan) Fuji Speedway	July 18–19
2	Takanokono Hotel Fuji GT 300 km Race	(Japan) Fuji Speedway	August 8–9
3	Fujimaki Group Suzuka GT 300 km Race	(Japan) Suzuka Circuit	August 22–23
4	Fujimaki Group Motegi GT 300 km Race	(Japan) Twin Ring Motegi	September 12–13
5	Takanokono Hotel Fuji GT 300 km Race	(Japan) Fuji Speedway	October 3–4
6	Fujimaki Group Suzuka GT 300 km Race	(Japan) Suzuka Circuit	October 24–25
7	Fujimaki Group Motegi GT 300 km Race	(Japan) Twin Ring Motegi	November 7–8
8	Takanokono Hotel Fuji GT 300 km Race	(Japan) Fuji Speedway	November 28–29

== Teams and drivers ==
A total of 45 teams registered to take part in the 2020 Super GT season, 15 teams from the GT500 class, and 30 teams from the GT300 class.

=== GT500 ===
Team	Make	Car	Engine	No.	Drivers	Tyre	Rounds
(Japan) NDDP Racing with B-Max	Nissan	Nissan GT-R NISMO GT500	Nissan NR20B 2.0 L Turbo I4	3	(Japan) Kohei Hirate	MI	All
(Japan) NDDP Racing with B-Max	Nissan	Nissan GT-R NISMO GT500	Nissan NR20B 2.0 L Turbo I4	3	(Japan) Katsumasa Chiyo	MI	All
(Japan) ARTA	Honda	Honda NSX-GT	Honda HR-420E 2.0 L Turbo I4	8	(Japan) Tomoki Nojiri	B	All
(Japan) ARTA	Honda	Honda NSX-GT	Honda HR-420E 2.0 L Turbo I4	8	(Japan) Nirei Fukuzumi	B	All
(Japan) Team Impul	Nissan	Nissan GT-R NISMO GT500	Nissan NR20B 2.0 L Turbo I4	12	(Japan) Daiki Sasaki	B	All
(Japan) Team Impul	Nissan	Nissan GT-R NISMO GT500	Nissan NR20B 2.0 L Turbo I4	12	(Japan) Kazuki Hiramine	B	All
(Japan) TGR Team Wako's ROOKIE	Toyota GR	Toyota GR Supra GT500	Toyota RI4AG 2.0 L Turbo I4	14	(Japan) Kazuya Oshima	B	All
(Japan) TGR Team Wako's ROOKIE	Toyota GR	Toyota GR Supra GT500	Toyota RI4AG 2.0 L Turbo I4	14	(Japan) Sho Tsuboi	B	All
(Japan) TGR Team ZENT Cerumo	Toyota GR	Toyota GR Supra GT500	Toyota RI4AG 2.0 L Turbo I4	38	(Japan) Yuji Tachikawa	B	All
(Japan) TGR Team ZENT Cerumo	Toyota GR	Toyota GR Supra GT500	Toyota RI4AG 2.0 L Turbo I4	38	(Japan) Hiroaki Ishiura	B	All
(Japan) Team Red Bull Mugen	Honda	Honda NSX-GT	Honda HR-420E 2.0 L Turbo I4	16	(Japan) Hideki Mutoh	Y	All
(Japan) Team Red Bull Mugen	Honda	Honda NSX-GT	Honda HR-420E 2.0 L Turbo I4	16	(Japan) Ukyo Sasahara	Y	All
(Japan) Keihin REAL Racing	Honda	Honda NSX-GT	Honda HR-420E 2.0 L Turbo I4	17	(Japan) Koudai Tsukakoshi	B	All
(Japan) Keihin REAL Racing	Honda	Honda NSX-GT	Honda HR-420E 2.0 L Turbo I4	17	(Belgium) Bertrand Baguette	B	All
(Japan) TGR Team WedsSport Bandoh	Toyota GR	Toyota GR Supra GT500	Toyota RI4AG 2.0 L Turbo I4	19	(Japan) Yuji Kunimoto	Y	All
(Japan) TGR Team WedsSport Bandoh	Toyota GR	Toyota GR Supra GT500	Toyota RI4AG 2.0 L Turbo I4	19	(Japan) Ritomo Miyata	Y	All
(Japan) NISMO	Nissan	Nissan GT-R NISMO GT500	Nissan NR20B 2.0 L Turbo I4	23	(Japan) Tsugio Matsuda	MI	All
(Japan) NISMO	Nissan	Nissan GT-R NISMO GT500	Nissan NR20B 2.0 L Turbo I4	23	(Italy) Ronnie Quintarelli	MI	All
(Japan) Kondo Racing	Nissan	Nissan GT-R NISMO GT500	Nissan NR20B 2.0 L Turbo I4	24	(Japan) Mitsunori Takaboshi	Y	All
(Japan) Kondo Racing	Nissan	Nissan GT-R NISMO GT500	Nissan NR20B 2.0 L Turbo I4	24	(United Kingdom) Jann Mardenborough	Y	All
(Japan) TGR Team au TOM'S	Toyota GR	Toyota GR Supra GT500	Toyota RI4AG 2.0 L Turbo I4	36	(Japan) Yuhi Sekiguchi	B	All
(Japan) TGR Team au TOM'S	Toyota GR	Toyota GR Supra GT500	Toyota RI4AG 2.0 L Turbo I4	36	(France) Sacha Fenestraz	B	All
(Japan) TGR Team KeePer TOM'S	Toyota GR	Toyota GR Supra GT500	Toyota RI4AG 2.0 L Turbo I4	37	(Japan) Ryō Hirakawa	B	All
(Japan) TGR Team KeePer TOM'S	Toyota GR	Toyota GR Supra GT500	Toyota RI4AG 2.0 L Turbo I4	37	(New Zealand) Nick Cassidy	B	1–6
(Japan) TGR Team KeePer TOM'S	Toyota GR	Toyota GR Supra GT500	Toyota RI4AG 2.0 L Turbo I4	37	(Japan) Kenta Yamashita	B	7–8
(Japan) TGR Team SARD	Toyota GR	Toyota GR Supra GT500	Toyota RI4AG 2.0 L Turbo I4	39	(Japan) Yuichi Nakayama	B	All
(Japan) TGR Team SARD	Toyota GR	Toyota GR Supra GT500	Toyota RI4AG 2.0 L Turbo I4	39	(Japan) Kenta Yamashita	B	1
(Japan) TGR Team SARD	Toyota GR	Toyota GR Supra GT500	Toyota RI4AG 2.0 L Turbo I4	39	(Japan) Sena Sakaguchi	B	2
(Japan) TGR Team SARD	Toyota GR	Toyota GR Supra GT500	Toyota RI4AG 2.0 L Turbo I4	39	(Finland) Heikki Kovalainen	B	3–8
(Japan) Modulo Nakajima Racing	Honda	Honda NSX-GT	Honda HR-420E 2.0 L Turbo I4	64	(Japan) Takuya Izawa	D	All
(Japan) Modulo Nakajima Racing	Honda	Honda NSX-GT	Honda HR-420E 2.0 L Turbo I4	64	(Japan) Hiroki Otsu	D	All
(Japan) Team Kunimitsu	Honda	Honda NSX-GT	Honda HR-420E 2.0 L Turbo I4	100	(Japan) Naoki Yamamoto	B	All
(Japan) Team Kunimitsu	Honda	Honda NSX-GT	Honda HR-420E 2.0 L Turbo I4	100	(Japan) Tadasuke Makino	B	All

=== GT300 ===
Team	Make	Car	Engine	No.	Drivers	Tyre	Rounds
(Japan) Cars Tokai Dream28	Lotus	Lotus Evora MC GT300	GTA V8 4.5 L V8	2	(Japan) Hiroki Katoh	Y	All
(Japan) Cars Tokai Dream28	Lotus	Lotus Evora MC GT300	GTA V8 4.5 L V8	2	(Japan) Masataka Yanagida	Y	All
(Japan) Goodsmile Racing & Team UKYO	Mercedes-AMG	Mercedes-AMG GT3 Evo	Mercedes-AMG M159 6.2 L V8	4	(Japan) Nobuteru Taniguchi	Y	All
(Japan) Goodsmile Racing & Team UKYO	Mercedes-AMG	Mercedes-AMG GT3 Evo	Mercedes-AMG M159 6.2 L V8	4	(Japan) Tatsuya Kataoka	Y	All
(Japan) Team Mach	Toyota	Toyota 86 MC GT300	GTA V8 4.5 L V8	5	(Japan) Natsu Sakaguchi	Y	All
(Japan) Team Mach	Toyota	Toyota 86 MC GT300	GTA V8 4.5 L V8	5	(Japan) Yuya Hiraki	Y	All
(Japan) Advics muta Racing INGING	Toyota	Toyota 86 MC GT300	GTA V8 4.5 L V8	6	(Japan) Ryohei Sakaguchi	B	All
(Japan) Advics muta Racing INGING	Toyota	Toyota 86 MC GT300	GTA V8 4.5 L V8	6	(Japan) Kazuto Kotaka	B	1–6, 8
(Japan) Advics muta Racing INGING	Toyota	Toyota 86 MC GT300	GTA V8 4.5 L V8	6	(Japan) Yuui Tsutsumi	B	7
(Japan) BMW Team Studie × CSL	BMW	BMW M6 GT3	BMW S63B44 4.4 L Twin Turbo V8	7	(Japan) Seiji Ara	Y	All
(Japan) BMW Team Studie × CSL	BMW	BMW M6 GT3	BMW S63B44 4.4 L Twin Turbo V8	7	(Japan) Tomohide Yamaguchi	Y	All
(Japan) Pacific - D'station Racing AMR	Aston Martin	Aston Martin Vantage AMR GT3	Aston Martin M177 4.0 L Twin Turbo V8	9	(Japan) Tomonobu Fujii	MI	All
(Japan) Pacific - D'station Racing AMR	Aston Martin	Aston Martin Vantage AMR GT3	Aston Martin M177 4.0 L Twin Turbo V8	9	(Japan) Kei Cozzolino	MI	1–4, 6–7
(Japan) Pacific - D'station Racing AMR	Aston Martin	Aston Martin Vantage AMR GT3	Aston Martin M177 4.0 L Twin Turbo V8	9	(Japan) Takuro Shinohara	MI	5, 8
(Japan) GAINER	Nissan	Nissan GT-R Nismo GT3	Nissan VR38DETT 3.8 L Twin Turbo V6	10	(Japan) Kazuki Hoshino	Y	All
(Japan) GAINER	Nissan	Nissan GT-R Nismo GT3	Nissan VR38DETT 3.8 L Twin Turbo V6	10	(Japan) Keishi Ishikawa	Y	All
(Japan) GAINER	Nissan	Nissan GT-R Nismo GT3	Nissan VR38DETT 3.8 L Twin Turbo V6	11	(Japan) Katsuyuki Hiranaka	D	All
(Japan) GAINER	Nissan	Nissan GT-R Nismo GT3	Nissan VR38DETT 3.8 L Twin Turbo V6	11	(Japan) Hironobu Yasuda	D	All
(Japan) Team UpGarage (Note: Car No. 18 entered as Team UpGarage, and car No. 55 entered as ARTA)	Honda	Honda NSX GT3 Evo	Honda JNC1 3.5 L Twin Turbo V6	18	(Japan) Takashi Kobayashi	Y	All
(Japan) Team UpGarage	Honda	Honda NSX GT3 Evo	Honda JNC1 3.5 L Twin Turbo V6	18	(Japan) Kosuke Matsuura	Y	All
(Japan) ARTA	Honda	Honda NSX GT3 Evo	Honda JNC1 3.5 L Twin Turbo V6	55	(Japan) Toshiki Oyu	B	All
(Japan) ARTA	Honda	Honda NSX GT3 Evo	Honda JNC1 3.5 L Twin Turbo V6	55	(Japan) Shinichi Takagi	B	1–6
(Japan) ARTA	Honda	Honda NSX GT3 Evo	Honda JNC1 3.5 L Twin Turbo V6	55	(Japan) Nobuharu Matsushita	B	7–8
(Japan) Audi Team Hitotsuyama	Audi	Audi R8 LMS Evo	Audi DAR 5.2 L V10	21	(Japan) Shintaro Kawabata	Y	All
(Japan) Audi Team Hitotsuyama	Audi	Audi R8 LMS Evo	Audi DAR 5.2 L V10	21	(Japan) Tsubasa Kondo	Y	All
(Japan) R'Qs Motor Sports	Mercedes-AMG	Mercedes-AMG GT3	Mercedes-AMG M159 6.2 L V8	22	(Japan) Hisashi Wada	Y	1–4, 6–8
(Japan) R'Qs Motor Sports	Mercedes-AMG	Mercedes-AMG GT3	Mercedes-AMG M159 6.2 L V8	22	(Japan) Masaki Jyonai	Y	1–4, 6–8
(Japan) Arnage Racing	Mercedes-AMG	Mercedes-AMG GT3	Mercedes-AMG M159 6.2 L V8	50	(Japan) Masaki Kano	Y	All
(Japan) Arnage Racing	Mercedes-AMG	Mercedes-AMG GT3	Mercedes-AMG M159 6.2 L V8	50	(Japan) Ryohei Yamashita	Y	1–4
(Japan) Arnage Racing	Mercedes-AMG	Mercedes-AMG GT3	Mercedes-AMG M159 6.2 L V8	50	(Japan) Kizuku Hirota	Y	5, 7
(Japan) Arnage Racing	Mercedes-AMG	Mercedes-AMG GT3	Mercedes-AMG M159 6.2 L V8	50	(Japan) Hideto Yasuoka	Y	6, 8
(Japan) Hoppy Team Tsuchiya (Note: Car No. 25 entered as Team Tsuchiya, and car No. 244 entered as Max Racing) (Japan) Max Racing	Porsche	Porsche 911 GT3 R	Porsche M97/80 4.2 L F6	25	(Japan) Takamitsu Matsui	Y	All
(Japan) Hoppy Team Tsuchiya (Japan) Max Racing	Porsche	Porsche 911 GT3 R	Porsche M97/80 4.2 L F6	25	(Japan) Kimiya Sato	Y	All
(Japan) Hoppy Team Tsuchiya (Japan) Max Racing	Lexus	Lexus RC F GT3	Lexus 2UR-GSE 5.4 L V8	244	(Japan) Atsushi Miyake	Y	All
(Japan) Hoppy Team Tsuchiya (Japan) Max Racing	Lexus	Lexus RC F GT3	Lexus 2UR-GSE 5.4 L V8	244	(Japan) Rintaro Kubo	Y	1–7
(Japan) Hoppy Team Tsuchiya (Japan) Max Racing	Lexus	Lexus RC F GT3	Lexus 2UR-GSE 5.4 L V8	244	(Japan) Yuui Tsutsumi	Y	8
(Japan) apr	Toyota	Toyota GR Sport Prius PHV apr GT	Toyota 2UR-GSE 5.4 L V8	30	(Japan) Hiroaki Nagai	Y	All
(Japan) apr	Toyota	Toyota GR Sport Prius PHV apr GT	Toyota 2UR-GSE 5.4 L V8	30	(Japan) Manabu Orido	Y	All
(Japan) apr	Toyota	Toyota GR Sport Prius PHV apr GT	Toyota 2UR-GSE 5.4 L Hybrid V8	31	(Japan) Koki Saga	B	All
(Japan) apr	Toyota	Toyota GR Sport Prius PHV apr GT	Toyota 2UR-GSE 5.4 L Hybrid V8	31	(Japan) Yuhki Nakayama	B	All
(Hong Kong) X Works	Audi	Audi R8 LMS Evo	Audi DAR 5.2 L V10	33	(Hong Kong) Shaun Thong	Y	All
(Hong Kong) X Works	Audi	Audi R8 LMS Evo	Audi DAR 5.2 L V10	33	(Japan) Takuro Shinohara	Y	1
(Hong Kong) X Works	Audi	Audi R8 LMS Evo	Audi DAR 5.2 L V10	33	(Japan) Hiroyuki Matsumura	Y	2
(Hong Kong) X Works	Audi	Audi R8 LMS Evo	Audi DAR 5.2 L V10	33	(Japan) Takeshi Kimura	Y	3–4
(Hong Kong) X Works	Audi	Audi R8 LMS Evo	Audi DAR 5.2 L V10	33	(Japan) Kota Sasaki	Y	5–8
(Japan) Modulo Drago Corse	Honda	Honda NSX GT3 Evo	Honda JNC1 3.5 L Twin Turbo V6	34	(Japan) Ryo Michigami	Y	All
(Japan) Modulo Drago Corse	Honda	Honda NSX GT3 Evo	Honda JNC1 3.5 L Twin Turbo V6	34	(Australia) Jake Parsons	Y	All
arto Ping An Team Thailand	Lexus	Lexus RC F GT3	Lexus 2UR-GSE 5.4 L V8	35	(Japan) Masahiro Sasaki	Y	2–5
arto Ping An Team Thailand	Lexus	Lexus RC F GT3	Lexus 2UR-GSE 5.4 L V8	35	(Japan) Yuui Tsutsumi	Y	2–5
arto Ping An Team Thailand	Lexus	Lexus RC F GT3	Lexus 2UR-GSE 5.4 L V8	35	(United Kingdom) Sean Walkinshaw	Y	6–8
arto Ping An Team Thailand	Lexus	Lexus RC F GT3	Lexus 2UR-GSE 5.4 L V8	35	(Switzerland) Mathias Beche	Y	6–8
(Japan) NILZZ Racing	Nissan	Nissan GT-R Nismo GT3	Nissan VR38DETT 3.8 L Twin Turbo V6	48	(Japan) Taiyou Iida	Y	All
(Japan) NILZZ Racing	Nissan	Nissan GT-R Nismo GT3	Nissan VR38DETT 3.8 L Twin Turbo V6	48	(Japan) Yuki Tanaka	Y	1–5, 8
(Japan) NILZZ Racing	Nissan	Nissan GT-R Nismo GT3	Nissan VR38DETT 3.8 L Twin Turbo V6	48	(Japan) Yusaku Shibata	Y	6
(Japan) NILZZ Racing	Nissan	Nissan GT-R Nismo GT3	Nissan VR38DETT 3.8 L Twin Turbo V6	48	(Japan) Ryuichiro Tomita	Y	7
(Japan) Saitama Toyopet Green Brave	Toyota GR	Toyota GR Supra GT300	Toyota 2UR-GSE 5.4 L V8	52	(Japan) Hiroki Yoshida	B	All
(Japan) Saitama Toyopet Green Brave	Toyota GR	Toyota GR Supra GT300	Toyota 2UR-GSE 5.4 L V8	52	(Japan) Kohta Kawaai	B	All
(Japan) Kondo Racing	Nissan	Nissan GT-R Nismo GT3	Nissan VR38DETT 3.8 L Twin Turbo V6	56	(Japan) Kiyoto Fujinami	Y	All
(Japan) Kondo Racing	Nissan	Nissan GT-R Nismo GT3	Nissan VR38DETT 3.8 L Twin Turbo V6	56	(Brazil) João Paulo de Oliveira	Y	All
(Japan) LM Corsa	Lexus	Lexus RC F GT3	Lexus 2UR-GSE 5.4 L V8	60	(Japan) Hiroki Yoshimoto	MI	All
(Japan) LM Corsa	Lexus	Lexus RC F GT3	Lexus 2UR-GSE 5.4 L V8	60	(Japan) Shunsuke Kohno	MI	All
(Japan) R&D Sport	Subaru	Subaru BRZ R&D Sport	Subaru EJ20 2.0 L Turbo F4	61	(Japan) Takuto Iguchi	D	All
(Japan) R&D Sport	Subaru	Subaru BRZ R&D Sport	Subaru EJ20 2.0 L Turbo F4	61	(Japan) Hideki Yamauchi	D	All
(Japan) K2 R&D LEON Racing	Mercedes-AMG	Mercedes-AMG GT3 Evo	Mercedes-AMG M159 6.2 L V8	65	(Japan) Naoya Gamou	B	All
(Japan) K2 R&D LEON Racing	Mercedes-AMG	Mercedes-AMG GT3 Evo	Mercedes-AMG M159 6.2 L V8	65	(Japan) Togo Suganami	B	All
(Japan) JLOC	Lamborghini	Lamborghini Huracán GT3 Evo	Lamborghini DGF 5.2 L V10	87	(Japan) Tsubasa Takahashi	Y	All
(Japan) JLOC	Lamborghini	Lamborghini Huracán GT3 Evo	Lamborghini DGF 5.2 L V10	87	(Japan) Shinnosuke Yamada	Y	All
(Japan) JLOC	Lamborghini	Lamborghini Huracán GT3 Evo	Lamborghini DGF 5.2 L V10	88	(Japan) Takashi Kogure	Y	All
(Japan) JLOC	Lamborghini	Lamborghini Huracán GT3 Evo	Lamborghini DGF 5.2 L V10	88	(Japan) Yuya Motojima	Y	All
(Japan) K-tunes Racing	Lexus	Lexus RC F GT3	Lexus 2UR-GSE 5.4 L V8	96	(Japan) Morio Nitta	D	All
(Japan) K-tunes Racing	Lexus	Lexus RC F GT3	Lexus 2UR-GSE 5.4 L V8	96	(Japan) Sena Sakaguchi	D	1,3–8
(Japan) K-tunes Racing	Lexus	Lexus RC F GT3	Lexus 2UR-GSE 5.4 L V8	96	(Japan) Shigekazu Wakisaka	D	2
(Japan) Tomei Sports	Nissan	Nissan GT-R Nismo GT3	Nissan VR38DETT 3.8 L Twin Turbo V6	360	(Japan) Takayuki Aoki	Y	All
(Japan) Tomei Sports	Nissan	Nissan GT-R Nismo GT3	Nissan VR38DETT 3.8 L Twin Turbo V6	360	(Japan) Atsushi Tanaka	Y	1, 5, 8
(Japan) Tomei Sports	Nissan	Nissan GT-R Nismo GT3	Nissan VR38DETT 3.8 L Twin Turbo V6	360	(Japan) Yusaku Shibata	Y	2–4
(Japan) Tomei Sports	Nissan	Nissan GT-R Nismo GT3	Nissan VR38DETT 3.8 L Twin Turbo V6	360	(Japan) Takuya Otaki	Y	6–7

=== Vehicle changes ===
==== GT500 Class ====
- All GT500 vehicles will be prepared to the unified Class One technical regulations created by the GTA and the Deutsche Tourenwagen Masters' sanctioning body, the ITR. The cars will feature a standard engine control unit (ECU) manufactured by Bosch, who joined Super GT as a sponsor of the series from 2020.
- After being represented by the Lexus brand from 2006 to 2019, Toyota will field the fifth-generation GR Supra in the GT500 Class, beginning in 2020. The GR Supra will be powered by the same Toyota RI4A powerplant used in its predecessors, the Lexus RC F, and the Lexus LC 500. To reflect the change, all six of Toyota's GT500 entries will carry the "TGR Team" prefix in their team names.
- After a change in the GT500 technical regulations that state that the engine must be mounted in front of the cockpit, Honda announced that they will field a front-engined version of the traditionally mid-engined NSX-GT in 2020. It will be the first Honda GT500 car with a front-engine layout since the HSV-010 GT raced from 2010 to 2013.
- Nissan will field an updated version of the GT-R NISMO GT500 in 2020.

==== GT300 Class ====
- Saitama Toyopet GreenBrave will field the fifth-generation Toyota GR Supra in the GT300 Class from 2020. Built to JAF-GT GT300 regulations, the GT300 GR Supra will be powered by Toyota's 5.4 litre 2UR-GSE V8 engine.
- On December 6, 2019, Tsuchiya Engineering announced a customer racing partnership with Porsche to field the latest 911 GT3-R in the 2020 season.
- X Works Racing will change from the Nissan GT-R NISMO GT3 to the Audi R8 LMS GT3 in 2020.

=== Entrant changes ===
==== GT500 Class ====
- Honda: On January 10, 2020, Honda announced their Super GT Program.
  - On October 29, 2019, 2018 GT500 Drivers' Champion Jenson Button announced that he would not return to race in Super GT in 2020. Tadasuke Makino, who drove for Nakajima Racing, transferred to Team Kunimitsu in 2020, in place of Button.
  - Team Mugen driver Daisuke Nakajima announced that he retire from racing after 2019 season. Reigning Formula 3 Asian Championship and Porsche Carrera Cup Japan Champion, Ukyo Sasahara, joined Team Mugen to replace Nakajima. Red Bull have become the title sponsor of Team Mugen, beginning in 2020.
  - Narain Karthikeyan who raced with Nakajima Racing, confirmed in January that he would not return to the series. Takuya Izawa moved to Nakajima Racing in an all-new driver lineup alongside fellow GT300 graduate, Hiroki Otsu.
  - Reigning GT300 Drivers' Champion, Nirei Fukuzumi, was promoted by Autobacs Racing Team Aguri (ARTA) to their GT500 car, replacing veteran
- Nissan:
  - On December 7, 2019, Porsche factory driver Frédéric Makowiecki returned to the IMSA WeatherTech Sports Car Championship full-time in 2020, ruling him out for a full-time return to Super GT. His departure from Nissan was confirmed on January 10, 2020, along with that of James Rossiter, who has ended his career in Japan after seven seasons to focus on his role with the DS Techeetah Formula E Team.
  - Katsumasa Chiyo, who raced full-time in the Intercontinental GT Challenge for Nissan in 2019, returns to GT500 on a full-time basis at NDDP Racing with B-Max, replacing Makowiecki.
  - At Team Impul, Kazuki Hiramine steps up from the GT300 class after six seasons, to replace Rossiter.
- Toyota: Toyota Gazoo Racing announced their 2020 motorsport activities on February 7, 2020.
  - 2019 GT500 Championship winners Team LeMans parted ways with Toyota Gazoo Racing at the end of the season. To replace their entry, a new team, "TGR Team Wako's Rookie," was announced for 2020. The new team is owned by KTR Co. Ltd, with vehicle maintenance being handled by TGR Team Cerumo. Wako Chemical, the title sponsor of Team Le Mans from 2016 to 2019, will be the title sponsor of the new team, and 2005 GT500 Drivers' Champion, Toranosuke Takagi, will be the Team Director. TGR Team Wako's Rookie will carry the number 14, and for the first time since 1998, the number one plate, reserved for the GT500 Champion team, will not be in use. The new TGR Team Wako's Rookie entry will feature 2019 GT500 Champion Kazuya Oshima and 2018 All-Japan Formula Three Champion Sho Tsuboi as its drivers. Kenta Yamashita will not return to the series in 2020, as they will focus solely on their roles in the FIA World Endurance Championship and Japanese Super Formula Championship.
  - Tsuboi's place at TGR Team WedsSport Bandoh will be taken by GT300 graduate and 2019 All-Japan F3 vice-champion Ritomo Miyata, the first person on the autism spectrum to race full-time in the premier class of Super GT.
  - 2019 All-Japan F3 Champion, Sacha Fenestraz, also steps up to the GT500 class, driving for TGR Team au TOM's. Two-time 24 Hours of Le Mans winner Kazuki Nakajima. Masanori Sekiya resigned as executive director of TGR Team TOM's, effective 31 March.
  - Three-time GT500 Drivers' Champion Juichi Wakisaka, who was the Team Director at Team Le Mans from 2016 to 2019, now takes over the same position at TGR Team SARD.

==== GT300 Class ====
- On January 29, 2020, Tsuchiya Engineering announced an expanded partnership with title sponsor Hoppy Beverage Company, with Hoppy CEO Mina Ishiwatari purchasing a share of the team, and changed their name to "Hoppy Team Tsuchiya."
- Aston Martin Racing customer squad D'station Racing will partner with Pacific Racing Team under the new name "Pacific-D'station Racing" in 2020, and changed their number from 7 to 9. They will also be the first full-time GT300 entry to run on Michelin tyres since 2014. 2014 Le Mans class winner and Aston Martin factory driver Nicki Thiim was scheduled to join Pacific-D'station Racing for 2020, alongside Tomonobu Fujii.
- Max Racing, who had competed in the Pirelli Super Taikyu Series' ST-X (FIA GT3) category from 2018 to 2019, announced that they will move up to the GT300 class of Super GT beginning in 2020. Former Super GT driver Tetsuya Tanaka was appointed team director, and the aforementioned Tsuchiya Engineering will be in charge of vehicle maintenance. They will field a Lexus RC F GT3, running on Yokohama tyres. They appointed GT300 veteran Rintaro Kubo and FIA F4 Japanese Championship graduate Atsushi Miyake as their drivers.
- INGING Motorsport will return to the GT300 class as a stand-alone entry in 2020, fielding a Toyota 86 MC previously used by Panther arto Team Thailand. They will carry the number 6, the number which they had previously used in the 1998 All-Japan GT Championship and had since been used by Team Le Mans until their split from Toyota. Their 86 MC will run on Bridgestone Potenza tyres. The team appointed Toyota Gazoo Racing young driver Kazuto Kotaka and veteran Ryohei Sakaguchi as their full-time driver lineup, joined by third driver Yuui Tsutsumi, who replaced Kotaka for Round 7 at Twin Ring Motegi when Kotaka contracted a high fever.
- Togo Suganami who drove for K2 R&D LEON Racing for last 2 rounds, will race with the team as the full time driver. The 2018 driver champion Haruki Kurosawa will step back, and work with the team as the team director.
- Team LeMans announced that they will take over vehicle maintenance and operation for Audi Team Hitotsuyama beginning in 2020. Two-time Nürburgring 24 Hours winner Christopher Mies and former Team Taisan driver Shintaro Kawabata were announced at Audi Team Hitotsuyama, to replace 2004 GT500 Champion Richard Lyons, and Ryuchiro Tomita, who would join Audi Sport Team WRT in the SRO GT World Challenge Europe Sprint Cup.
- Lamborghini Squadra Corse driver Dennis Lind was scheduled to join JLOC in their number 87 entry alongside Yuya Motojima. 2010 GT500 Champion Takashi Kogure and 2015 GT300 Champion André Couto were announced in the number 88 car.
- With Kazuki Hiramine and Sacha Fenestraz's respective promotions to GT500, Kondo Racing announced a new lineup for their GT300 team, featuring 2010 Japanese Top Formula Champion João Paulo de Oliveira and two-time Fuji 24 Hours winner Kiyoto Fujinami.
- BMW Team Studie will enter the GT300 class for the first time since 2017 under the name "BMW Team Studie x CSL", using the current BMW M6 GT3. Kazumichi Goh, the owner of Team Goh Motorsports (who entered Super GT in 2019 as McLaren Customer Racing Japan), was appointed as the Representative Director of the team. BMW Team Studie x CSL welcomes 2004 24 Hours of Le Mans winner Seiji Ara back to the team, alongside rookie gentleman driver Tomohide Yamaguchi. BMW Works driver Augusto Farfus was announced as a third driver, but did not appear due to COVID-19 travel restrictions.
- Two-time GT500 Champion Masataka Yanagida returned to Super GT full-time at Cars Tokai Dream28, replacing gentleman driver Kazuho Takahashi, who retired from racing in the series and will now focus on his role as team executive.
- All-Japan F3 and Euroformula Open race winner Toshiki Oyu replaced Nirei Fukuzumi at Autobacs Racing Team Aguri in their championship-winning Honda NSX GT3.
- Australian Jake Parsons returned to Super GT after a two-year absence, driving for Drago Corse alongside owner/driver Ryō Michigami.
- Lexus Customer Racing teams K-Tunes Racing and LM Corsa will change tyre suppliers for the 2020 season: K-Tunes Racing will switch from Bridgestone to Dunlop, and LM Corsa will switch from Dunlop to Michelin. All-Japan F3 graduate Shunsuke Kohno replaced Ritomo Miyata at LM Corsa.
- Kohta Kawaai graduated from the FIA F4 Japanese Championship to drive for Saitama Toyopet GreenBrave.
- All-Japan F3 National Class race winner Kizuku Hirota joined Arnage Racing as a third driver.
- Panther arto Team Thailand was renamed arto Ping An Team Thailand, reflecting an increased sponsorship agreement from the Chinese insurance company.

=== Mid-season changes ===
Due to travel restrictions put into place as a result of the 2019-20 coronavirus pandemic, several driver changes were necessitated, starting from the opening round at Fuji Speedway.

==== GT500 Class ====
- Heikki Kovalainen was the only driver not able to enter Japan. SARD signed reigning GT500 Champion Kenta Yamashita for the first round. while for the second round, the team signed GT300 runner-up Sena Sakaguchi. Kovalainen able to return for Round 3.
- Kenta Yamashita replaces Nick Cassidy at KeePer TOM'S for the final two races of the season, as Cassidy began preparations for his debut in the FIA Formula E World Championship.

==== GT300 Class ====
- Christopher Mies, Nicki Thiim, André Couto, and Dennis Lind were unable to compete in the series due to the Japanese government not allow them to enter Japan. Audi Team Hitotsuyama signed multiple Carrera Cup Japan champion Tsubasa Kondo to replace Mies. Pacific D'station Racing signed Kei Cozzolino as Thiim's replacement. While JLOC shuffle their line up, with Yuya Motojima move to the number 88 car to partner Takashi Kogure, and Tsubasa Takahashi, and Shinnosuke Yamada were appointed as the new drivers of the number 87 car.
- X Works Racing unable to bring Alex Au to race in Japan. The Hong Kong based team signed Takuro Shinohara to drove in for Round 1. Team Thailand have to miss Round 1 due to several personnel unable to enter Japan.
- Ex-Formula Renault Eurocup driver Hiroyuki Matsumura was entered for Round 2 to race with X-Works. Upon arto Team Thailand's return to the series at Round 2, they appointed Masahiro Sasaki and Yuui Tsutsumi After Sena Sakaguchi was called up to SARD for Round 2, K-tunes Racing appointed Shigekazu Wakisaka to replace him in the same event.
- CarGuy Racing owner Takeshi Kimura joins X-Works for round 3, and 4.
- 2005 GT300 Champion, Kota Sasaki was appointed to race with X-Works to race from round 5 onwards. Arnage Racing driver Ryosei Yamashita announced that he would be taking a hiatus from racing to focus on his family's business activities. Kizuku Hirota signed as Yamashita's replacement for round 5. Kei Cozzolino have to miss round 5, Pacific D'station signed Takuro Shinohara, who already raced in the series for round 1. R'Qs Motor Sports have to miss the 5th round.
- Sean Walkinshaw was able to enter Japan and participate from round 6 onwards. Nattapong Horthongkum was planned to race again with Walkinshaw, but was replaced by 2014 FIA WEC LMP1 Private team champion Mathias Beche. FIA F4 Japanese Championship race winner Takuya Otaki joined Tomei Sports for Rounds 6. While Nilzz Racing appointed Yusaku Shibata to drive in Round 6. Hideto Yasuoka returns to Arnage Racing to replace Kizuku Hirota.
- Nilzz Racing appointed GT World Challenge Europe driver Ryuichiro Tomita for Round 7, while Kizuku Hirota returns again for Arnage. Reigning GT300 Champion Shinichi Takagi was injured in after crash in Super Taikyu race at Okayama. Formula 2 race winner Nobuharu Matsushita was announced as Takagi's replacement at ARTA for the final two rounds of the season. Yuui Tsutsumi joins muta Racing INGING as a last minute replacement replacing Kazuto Kotaka.
- Takuro Shinohara, Hideto Yasuoka, and Atsushi Tanaka returns to Pacific D'station, Arnage and Tomei Sports respectively for round 8.

== Results ==
Drivers credited with winning Pole Position for their respective teams are indicated in bold text.

Round	Circuit	Date	Class	Pole position	Race winner
1	(Japan) Fuji Speedway	19 July	GT500	No. 37 TGR Team KeePer TOM'S	No. 37 TGR Team KeePer TOM'S
1	(Japan) Fuji Speedway	19 July	GT500	(New Zealand) Nick Cassidy **(Japan) Ryō Hirakawa**	**(New Zealand) Nick Cassidy** **(Japan) Ryō Hirakawa**
1	(Japan) Fuji Speedway	19 July	GT300	No. 65 K2 R&D LEON Racing	No. 52 Saitama Toyopet GreenBrave
1	(Japan) Fuji Speedway	19 July	GT300	**(Japan) Naoya Gamou** (Japan) Togo Suganami	**(Japan) Kohta Kawaai** **(Japan) Hiroki Yoshida**
2	(Japan) Fuji Speedway	9 August	GT500	No. 8 ARTA	No. 17 Keihin REAL Racing
2	(Japan) Fuji Speedway	9 August	GT500	(Japan) Nirei Fukuzumi **(Japan) Tomoki Nojiri**	**(Belgium) Bertrand Baguette** **(Japan) Koudai Tsukakoshi**
2	(Japan) Fuji Speedway	9 August	GT300	No. 6 Advics muta Racing INGING	No. 2 Cars Tokai Dream28
2	(Japan) Fuji Speedway	9 August	GT300	**(Japan) Kazuto Kotaka** (Japan) Ryohei Sakaguchi	**(Japan) Hiroki Katoh** **(Japan) Masataka Yanagida**
3	(Japan) Suzuka Circuit	23 August	GT500	No. 64 Modulo Nakajima Racing	No. 23 NISMO
3	(Japan) Suzuka Circuit	23 August	GT500	**(Japan) Takuya Izawa** (Japan) Hiroki Otsu	**(Japan) Tsugio Matsuda** **(Italy) Ronnie Quintarelli**
3	(Japan) Suzuka Circuit	23 August	GT300	No. 31 apr	No. 11 GAINER
3	(Japan) Suzuka Circuit	23 August	GT300	**(Japan) Yuhki Nakayama** (Japan) Koki Saga	**(Japan) Katsuyuki Hiranaka** **(Japan) Hironobu Yasuda**
4	(Japan) Twin Ring Motegi	13 September	GT500	No. 38 TGR Team ZENT Cerumo	No. 17 Keihin REAL Racing
4	(Japan) Twin Ring Motegi	13 September	GT500	(Japan) Hiroaki Ishiura **(Japan) Yuji Tachikawa**	**(Belgium) Bertrand Baguette** **(Japan) Koudai Tsukakoshi**
4	(Japan) Twin Ring Motegi	13 September	GT300	No. 360 Tomei Sports	No. 65 K2 R&D LEON Racing
4	(Japan) Twin Ring Motegi	13 September	GT300	**(Japan) Takayuki Aoki** (Japan) Yusaku Shibata	**(Japan) Naoya Gamou** **(Japan) Togo Suganami**
5	(Japan) Fuji Speedway	4 October	GT500	No. 8 ARTA	No. 39 TGR Team SARD
5	(Japan) Fuji Speedway	4 October	GT500	**(Japan) Nirei Fukuzumi** (Japan) Tomoki Nojiri	**(Japan) Yuichi Nakayama** **(Finland) Heikki Kovalainen**
5	(Japan) Fuji Speedway	4 October	GT300	No. 6 Advics muta Racing INGING	No. 56 Kondo Racing
5	(Japan) Fuji Speedway	4 October	GT300	**(Japan) Kazuto Kotaka** (Japan) Ryohei Sakaguchi	**(Japan) Kiyoto Fujinami** **(Brazil) João Paulo de Oliveira**
6	(Japan) Suzuka Circuit	25 October	GT500	No. 8 ARTA	No. 23 NISMO
6	(Japan) Suzuka Circuit	25 October	GT500	**(Japan) Nirei Fukuzumi** (Japan) Tomoki Nojiri	**(Japan) Tsugio Matsuda** **(Italy) Ronnie Quintarelli**
6	(Japan) Suzuka Circuit	25 October	GT300	No. 96 K-Tunes Racing	No. 21 Audi Team Hitotsuyama
6	(Japan) Suzuka Circuit	25 October	GT300	(Japan) Morio Nitta **(Japan) Sena Sakaguchi**	**(Japan) Shintaro Kawabata** **(Japan) Tsubasa Kondo**
7	(Japan) Twin Ring Motegi	8 November	GT500	No. 64 Modulo Nakajima Racing	No. 8 ARTA
7	(Japan) Twin Ring Motegi	8 November	GT500	**(Japan) Takuya Izawa** (Japan) Hiroki Otsu	**(Japan) Nirei Fukuzumi** **(Japan) Tomoki Nojiri**
7	(Japan) Twin Ring Motegi	8 November	GT300	No. 61 R&D Sport	No. 56 Kondo Racing
7	(Japan) Twin Ring Motegi	8 November	GT300	(Japan) Takuto Iguchi **(Japan) Hideki Yamauchi**	**(Japan) Kiyoto Fujinami** **(Brazil) João Paulo de Oliveira**
8	(Japan) Fuji Speedway	29 November	GT500	No. 37 TGR Team KeePer TOM'S	No. 100 Team Kunimitsu
8	(Japan) Fuji Speedway	29 November	GT500	(Japan) Ryō Hirakawa **(Japan) Kenta Yamashita**	**(Japan) Tadasuke Makino** **(Japan) Naoki Yamamoto**
8	(Japan) Fuji Speedway	29 November	GT300	No. 52 Saitama Toyopet GreenBrave	No. 52 Saitama Toyopet GreenBrave
8	(Japan) Fuji Speedway	29 November	GT300	**(Japan) Kohta Kawaai** (Japan) Hiroki Yoshida	**(Japan) Kohta Kawaai** **(Japan) Hiroki Yoshida**

== Championship standings ==
=== Drivers' championships ===
Scoring system

Position	1st	2nd	3rd	4th	5th	6th	7th	8th	9th	10th	Pole
Points	20	15	11	8	6	5	4	3	2	1	1

==== GT500 ====
Driver Ranking GT500 2020 Series
Rank	Driver	Team	FUJ (Japan)	FUJ (Japan)	SUZ (Japan)	MOT (Japan)	FUJ (Japan)	SUZ (Japan)	MOT (Japan)	FUJ (Japan)	Points
1	(Japan) Naoki Yamamoto (Japan) Tadasuke Makino	(Japan) No. 100 Team Kunimitsu	6	5	2	5	5	Ret	3	1	69
2	(Japan) Ryō Hirakawa	(Japan) No. 37 TGR Team KeePer TOM'S	1	4	7	6	4	Ret	6	2	67
3	(Japan) Koudai Tsukakoshi (Belgium) Bertrand Baguette	(Japan) No. 17 Keihin REAL Racing	Ret	1	8	1	10	10	5	4	59
4	(Japan) Yuhi Sekiguchi (France) Sacha Fenestraz	(Japan) No. 39 TGR Team au TOM'S	2	2	3	11	12	7	13	3	56
5	(Japan) Tomoki Nojiri (Japan) Nirei Fukuzumi	(Japan) No.8 ARTA	8	14	13	Ret	3	3	1	5	54
6	(Japan) Tsugio Matsuda (Italy) Ronnie Quintarelli	(Japan) No. 23 NISMO	11	9	1	8	11	1	7	9	51
7	(Japan) Kazuya Oshima (Japan) Sho Tsuboi	(Japan) No. 14 TGR Team Wako's Rookie	3	3	9	4	2	12	12	Ret	47
8	(New Zealand) Nick Cassidy	(Japan) No. 37 TGR Team KeePer TOM'S	1	4	7	6	4	Ret			46
9	(Japan) Yuichi Nakayama	(Japan) No. 39 TGR Team SARD	5	6	5	9	1	11	8	14	42
10	(Japan) Yuji Tachikawa (Japan) Hiroaki Ishiura	(Japan) No. 38 TGR Team ZENT Cerumo	4	7	Ret	2	9	5	10	8	40
11	(Finland) Heikki Kovalainen	(Japan) No. 39 TGR Team SARD			5	9	1	11	8	14	31
12	(Japan) Takuya Izawa (Japan) Hiroki Otsu	(Japan) No. 64 Modulo Nakajima Racing	13	13	4	10	13	6	2	11	31
13	(Japan) Kohei Hirate (Japan) Katsumasa Chiyo	(Japan) No. 3 NDDP Racing with B-Max	7	8	6	7	Ret	4	15	6	29
14	(Japan) Hideki Mutoh (Japan) Ukyo Sasahara	(Japan) No. 16 Team Red Bull Mugen	12	10	Ret	3	6	13	4	12	25
15	(Japan) Daiki Sasaki (Japan) Kazuki Hiramine	(Japan) No. 12 Team Impul	Ret	11	12	12	8	2	9	7	24
16	(Japan) Kenta Yamashita	(Japan) No. 39 TGR Team SARD	5 (Note: Only points scored for TGR Team KeePer TOM'S were counted towards Yamashita's final championship standings. Per Article 7.6 of the SUPER GT Sporting Regulations: "When a driver races different cars (per car number) during the season, the Series points for this driver will be counted separately (per car raced) and the higher number or points will be selected when calculating the Championship drivers’ ranking.")								21
16	(Japan) Kenta Yamashita	(Japan) No. 37 TGR Team KeePer TOM'S							6	2	21
17	(Japan) Yuji Kunimoto (Japan) Ritomo Miyata	(Japan) No. 19 TGR Team WedsSport Bandoh	9	15	10	Ret	7	9	11	10	10
18	(Japan) Sena Sakaguchi	(Japan) No. 39 TGR Team SARD		6							5
19	(Japan) Mitsunori Takaboshi (United Kingdom) Jann Mardenborough	(Japan) No. 24 Kondo Racing	10	12	11	13	14	8	14	13	4
Rank	Driver	Team	FUJ (Japan)	FUJ (Japan)	SUZ (Japan)	MOT (Japan)	FUJ (Japan)	SUZ (Japan)	MOT (Japan)	FUJ (Japan)	Points

Colour	Result
Gold	Winner
Silver	Second place
Bronze	Third place
Green	Points classification
Blue	Non-points classification
Blue	Non-classified finish (NC)
Purple	Retired, not classified (Ret)
Red	Did not qualify (DNQ)
Red	Did not pre-qualify (DNPQ)
Black	Disqualified (DSQ)
White	Did not start (DNS)
White	Withdrew (WD)
White	Race cancelled (C)
Blank	Did not practice (DNP)
Blank	Did not arrive (DNA)
Blank	Excluded (EX)

==== GT300 ====
Driver Ranking GT300 2020 Series
Rank	Driver	Team	FUJ (Japan)	FUJ (Japan)	SUZ (Japan)	MOT (Japan)	FUJ (Japan)	SUZ (Japan)	MOT (Japan)	FUJ (Japan)	Points
1	(Japan) Kiyoto Fujinami (Brazil) João Paulo de Oliveira	(Japan) No. 56 Kondo Racing	4	5	9	20	1	16	1	2	71
2	(Japan) Hiroki Yoshida (Japan) Kohta Kawaai	(Japan) No. 52 Saitama Toyopet GreenBrave	1	6	12	25	4	Ret	4	1	62
3	(Japan) Naoya Gamou (Japan) Togo Suganami	(Japan) No. 65 K2 R&D LEON Racing	6	4	6	1	3	10	19	4	59
4	(Japan) Toshiki Oyu	(Japan) No. 55 ARTA	7	3	26	7	2	7	8	7	45
5	(Japan) Takuto Iguchi (Japan) Hideki Yamauchi	(Japan) No. 61 R&D Sport	Ret	2	4	3	16	12	5	8	44
6	(Japan) Katsuyuki Hiranaka (Japan) Hironobu Yasuda	(Japan) No. 11 GAINER	2	21	1	6	10	15	9	18	43
7	(Japan) Shinichi Takagi	(Japan) No. 55 ARTA	7	3	26	7	2	7			38
8	(Japan) Nobuteru Taniguchi (Japan) Tatsuya Kataoka	(Japan) No. 4 Goodsmile Racing with Team UKYO	9	27	8	9	8	3	2	15	36
9	(Japan) Ryohei Sakaguchi	(Japan) No. 6 Advics muta Racing INGING	14	9	13	16	7	2	22	3	34
9	(Japan) Kazuto Kotaka	(Japan) No. 6 Advics muta Racing INGING	14	9	13	16	7	2		3	34
10	(Japan) Hiroki Katoh (Japan) Masataka Yanagida	(Japan) No. 2 Cars Tokai Dream28	12	1	3	13	27	11	24	23	31
11	(Japan) Shintaro Kawabata (Japan) Tsubasa Kondo	(Japan) No. 21 Audi Team Hitotsuyama	17	8	25	5	14	1	13	12	29
12	(Japan) Kazuki Hoshino (Japan) Keishi Ishikawa	(Japan) No. 10 GAINER	5	10	5	11	12	21	7	6	22
13	(Japan) Takashi Kogure (Japan) Yuya Motojima	(Japan) No. 88 JLOC	25	15	27	2	6	13	Ret	Ret	20
14	(Japan) Natsu Sakaguchi (Japan) Yuya Hiraki	(Japan) No. 5 Team Mach	3	11	29	23	15	4	Ret	Ret	19
15	(Japan) Takashi Kobayashi (Japan) Kosuke Matsuura	(Japan) No. 18 Team UpGarage	22	18	2	14	18	Ret	16	25	15
16	(Japan) Morio Nitta	(Japan) No. 96 K-tunes Racing	11	23	28	4	26	5	17	22	15
16	(Japan) Sena Sakaguchi	(Japan) No. 96 K-tunes Racing	11		28	4	26	5	17	22	15
17	(Japan) Takayuki Aoki	(Japan) No. 360 Tomei Sports	Ret	12	11	27	25	17	3	21	12
18	(Japan) Koki Saga (Japan) Yuhki Nakayama	(Japan) No. 31 apr	27	14	7	15	5	18	27	10	12
19	(Japan) Takuya Otaki	(Japan) No. 360 Tomei Sports						17	3		11
20	(Japan) Takamitsu Matsui (Japan) Kimiya Sato	(Japan) No. 25 Hoppy Team Tsuchiya	19	20	14	8	11	9	6	14	10
21	(Japan) Tomonobu Fujii	(Japan) No. Pacific - D'station Racing AMR	10	19	10	18	24	24	25	5	8
22	(Japan) Ryō Michigami (Australia) Jake Parsons	(Japan) No. 34 Modulo Drago Corse	8	7	19	10	13	27	14	17	8
23	(Japan) Nobuharu Matsushita	(Japan) No. 55 ARTA							8	7	7
24	(Japan) Takuro Shinohara	(Hong Kong) No. 33 X Works	18								6
24	(Japan) Takuro Shinohara	(Japan) No. 9 Pacific - D'station Racing AMR					24			5	6
25	(Japan) Tsubasa Takahashi (Japan) Shinnosuke Yamada	(Japan) No. 87 JLOC	26	25	16	Ret	17	6	26	Ret	5
26	(Japan) Seiji Ara (Japan) Tomohide Yamaguchi	(Japan) No. 7 BMW Team Studie × CSL	15	22	21	Ret	9	8	18	19	5
27	(Japan) Hiroki Yoshimoto (Japan) Shunsuke Kohno	(Japan) No. 60 LM Corsa	13	16	17	12	22	14	12	9	2
28	(Italy) Kei Cozzolino	(Japan) No. 9 Pacific - D'station Racing AMR	10	19	10	18		24	25		2
29	(Japan) Hiroaki Nagai (Japan) Manabu Orido	(Japan) No. 30 apr	21	17	Ret	24	20	20	10	13	1
30	(Japan) Yusaku Shibata	(Japan) No. 360 Tomei Sports		12	11	27					1
30	(Japan) Yusaku Shibata	(Japan) No. 48 NILZZ Racing						25			1
–	(Japan) Masaki Kano	(Japan) No. 50 Arnage Racing	20	24	18	22	23	23	21	11	0
–	(Japan) Hideto Yasuoka	(Japan) No. 50 Arnage Racing						23		11	0
–	(Japan) Taiyou Iida	(Japan) No. 48 NILZZ Racing	23	26	22	21	28	25	11	20	0
–	(Japan) Ryuichiro Tomita	(Japan) No. 48 NILZZ Racing							11		0
–	(Japan) Atsushi Miyake	(Japan) No. 244 Max Racing	16	13	20	26	19	WD	15	24	0
–	(Japan) Rintaro Kubo	(Japan) No. 244 Max Racing	16	13	20	26	19	WD	15		0
–	(Japan) Yuui Tsutsumi	No. 35 arto Ping An Team Thailand		Ret	15	19	21				0
–	(Japan) Yuui Tsutsumi	(Japan) No. 2 Advics muta Racing Inging							24		0
–	(Japan) Yuui Tsutsumi	(Japan) No. 244 Max Racing								24	0
–	(Japan) Masahiro Sasaki	No. 35 arto Ping An Team Thailand		Ret	15	19	21				0
–	(Hong Kong) Shaun Thong	(Hong Kong) No. 33 X Works	18	Ret	24	17	29	22	20	16	0
–	(Japan) Kota Sasaki	(Hong Kong) No. 33 X Works					29	22	20	16	0
–	(Japan) Takeshi Kimura	(Hong Kong) No. 33 X Works			24	17					0
–	(Japan) Ryosei Yamashita	(Japan) No. 50 Arnage Racing	20	24	18	22					0
–	(United Kingdom) Sean Walkinshaw (Switzerland) Mathias Beche	No. 35 arto Ping An Team Thailand						19	23	26	0
–	(Japan) Yuki Tanaka	(Japan) No. 48 NILZZ Racing	23	26	22	21	28			20	0
–	(Japan) Kizuku Hirota	(Japan) No. 50 Arnage Racing					23		21		0
–	(Japan) Atsushi Tanaka	(Japan) No. 360 Tomei Sports	Ret				25			21	0
–	(Japan) Hisashi Wada (Japan) Masaki Jyonai	(Japan) No. 22 R'Qs Motor Sports	24	28	23	Ret		26	28	27	0
–	(Japan) Shigekazu Wakisaka	(Japan) No. 96 K-tunes Racing		23							0
–	(Japan) Hiroyuki Matsumura	(Hong Kong) No. 33 X Works		Ret							0
Rank	Driver	Team	FUJ (Japan)	FUJ (Japan)	SUZ (Japan)	MOT (Japan)	FUJ (Japan)	SUZ (Japan)	MOT (Japan)	FUJ (Japan)	Points
