= Kohta Kawaai =

Japanese racing driver

- Nationality: (Japan) Japanese
- Born: August 7, 1994 (age 32) Shizuoka, Japan

Previous series
- 2020-23 2022 2016-2019: Super GT GT300; Super Formula Lights; F4 Japanese Championship

Championship titles
- 2023 2023: Super GT GT300; Super Taikyu ST-Z

Kohta Kawaai (川合 孝汰, Kawaai Kōta) (born August 7, 1994) is a Japanese racing driver. He currently competes for Saitama Toyopet GreenBrave in both the Super GT and Super Taikyu racing series.

Kawaai won the 2023 Super GT Championship in the GT300 class and the 2023 Super Taikyu Championship in the ST-Z class.

== Racing career ==
=== Early racing career ===
In 2016, Kawaai started his formula racing career in F4 Japanese Championship racing with Le Beausset Motorsports. He raced in the same series until 2019, where he claimed third in the standings behind Ren Sato, and Atsushi Miyake.

=== Super GT ===
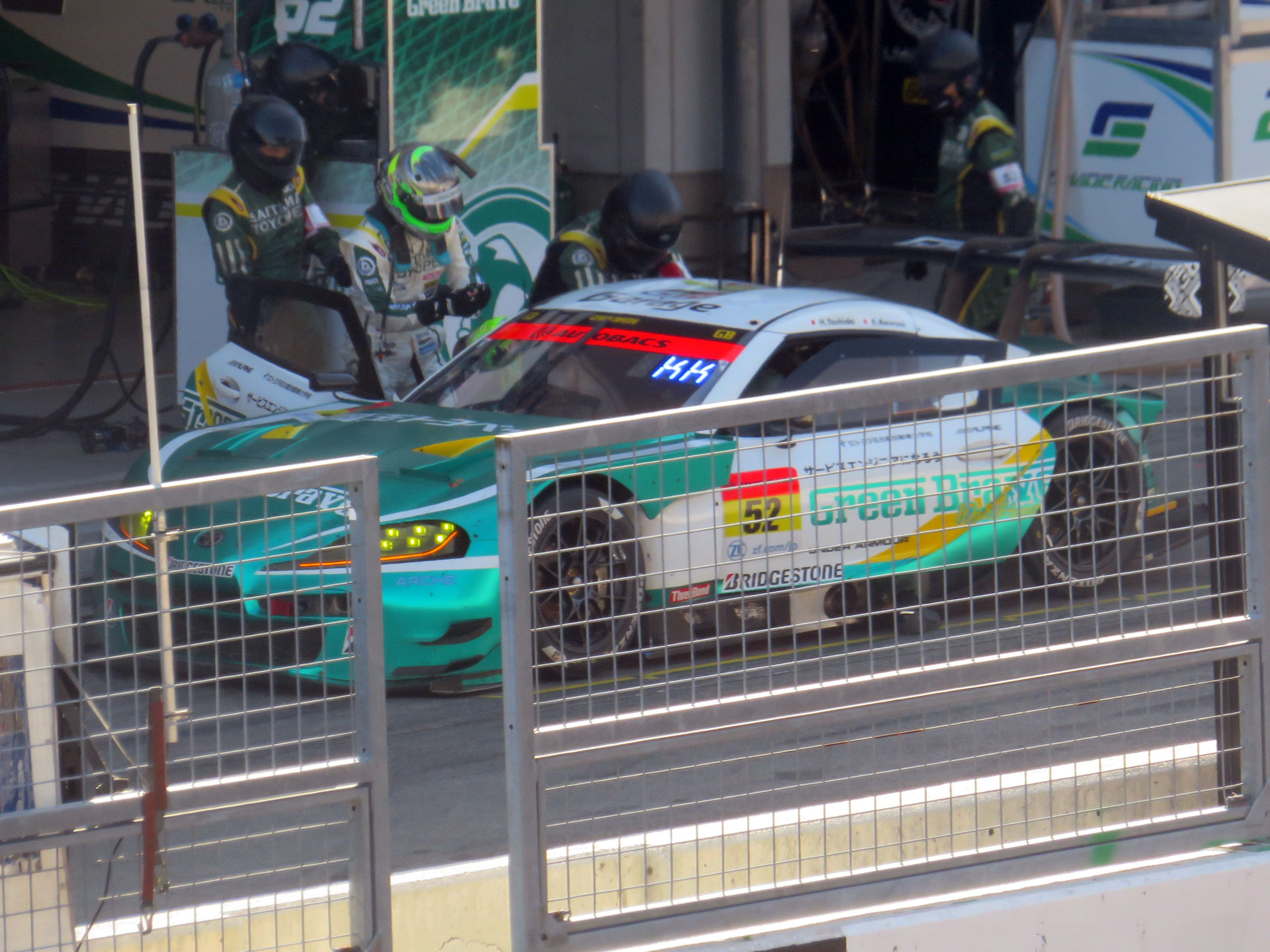
Kawaai during a pit stop at Suzuka in 2022

Kawaii moves up to Super GT - GT300 with Saitama Toyopet GreenBrave, paired up with Hiroki Yoshida. In his debut season, he managed to get a win and podiums which claimed him and Yoshida to second in the standings behind to Kondo Racing of Kiyoto Fujinami & João Paulo de Oliveira. Kawaai continued to race with the same team, claimed ninth in the standings despite missing one race after he tested positive for COVID-19, where he replaced by Taku Bamba. in 2022, with the same team Kawaai managed to clinch a win at Autopolis with also another podium, and gets fourtth in the standings.

In 2023, Saitama Toyopet GreenBrave retained both Kawaai & Hiroki Yoshida and they claimed two wins and four podiums. Kawaai went on to win the 2023 Super GT Championship in the GT300 class alongside Yoshida.

=== Super Formula Lights ===
Kawaai returned to formula racing in 2022, competed in Super Formula Lights for Rn-Sports. He claimed his first pole in the series, and competed only three rounds where he claimed eighth in the final standings.

== Racing record ==
=== Career summary ===
Season	Series	Team	Races	Wins	Poles	FLaps	Podiums	Points	Position
2016	F4 Japanese Championship	Le Beausset Motorsports	14	0	0	0	1	56	11th
2017	F4 Japanese Championship	Le Beausset Motorsports	14	0	0	0	0	78	8th
2018	F4 Japanese Championship	Le Beausset Motorsports	14	0	0	1	2	135	4th
2019	F4 Japanese Championship	Le Beausset Motorsports	14	0	0	1	4	131	**3rd**
2020	Super GT - GT300	Saitama Toyopet GreenBrave	8	2	2	1	2	62	**2nd**
2020	Super Taikyu - ST-3	Saitama Toyopet GreenBrave	5	2	1	1	4	114‡	**2nd‡**
2021	Super GT - GT300	Saitama Toyopet GreenBrave	7	0	0	0	2	34	9th
2021	Super Taikyu - ST-3	Saitama Toyopet GreenBrave	6	2	1	4	4	95.5‡	4th‡
2022	Super GT - GT300	Saitama Toyopet GreenBrave	8	1	0	0	2	48	4th
2022	Super Taikyu - ST-3	Saitama Toyopet GreenBrave	6	3	2	2	4	134‡	**2nd‡**
2022	Super Formula Lights	Rn-Sports	12	0	1	0	0	10	8th
2023	Super GT - GT300	Saitama Toyopet GreenBrave	8	2	0	1	4	74	**1st**
2023	Super Taikyu - ST-Z	Saitama Toyopet GreenBrave	7	4	2	0	7	174‡	**1st‡**
2024	Nürburgring Langstrecken-Serie - VT2-R+4WD								
2025	Nürburgring Langstrecken-Serie - VT2-RWD								
2026	Porsche Carrera Cup Japan	Starrise Racing	1	0	0	0	0	3.5	21st
2026	Super GT - GT300	JLOC	2	0	0	0	0	4	39th

‡ Team standings

=== Complete F4 Japanese Championship results ===
(key) (Races in bold indicate pole position) (Races in italics indicate fastest lap)

Year	Team	1	2	3	4	5	6	7	8	9	10	11	12	13	14	DC	Pts
2017	Le Beausset Motorsports	OKA; 1 Ret	OKA; 2; 6	FUJ1; 1; 8	FUJ1; 2; 7	SUG; 1; 5	SUG; 2; 10	FUJ2; 1; 14	FUJ2; 2; 13	FUJ2; 3; 27	SUZ; 1; 25	SUZ; 2; 14	MOT; 1; 1	MOT; 2; 9	MOT; 3 Ret	11th	56
2017	Le Beausset Motorsports	OKA; 1 Ret	OKA; 2; 7	FUJ1; 1; 7	FUJ1; 2; 9	AUT; 1; 4	AUT; 2; 5	SUG; 1; 9	SUG; 2 Ret	FUJ2; 1; 7	FUJ2; 2; 21	SUZ; 1; 6	SUZ; 2; 7	MOT; 1; 4	MOT; 2; 7	8th	76
2018	Le Beausset Motorsports	OKA; 1; 8	OKA; 2; 8	FUJ1; 1; 4	FUJ1; 2; 4	SUZ; 1; 5	SUZ; 2; 7	FUJ2; 1; 5	FUJ2; 2; 7	SUG; 1; 2	SUG; 2; 3	AUT; 1; 4	AUT; 2; 6	MOT; 1; 5	MOT; 2; 6	4th	135
2019	Le Beausset Motorsports	OKA; 1; 20	OKA; 2; 5	FUJ1; 1; 5	FUJ1; 2; 3	SUZ; 1; 7	SUZ; 2; 6	FUJ2; 1; 6	FUJ2; 2; 6	AUT; 1; 5	AUT; 2; 3	SUG; 1; 3	SUG; 2; 6	MOT; 1 Ret	MOT; 2; 2	3rd	131

=== Complete Super Formula Lights results ===
(key) (Races in bold indicate pole position) (Races in italics indicate fastest lap)

Year	Entrant	1	2	3	4	5	6	7	8	9	10	11	12	13	14	15	16	17	18	Pos	Points
2022	Rn-Sports	**FUJ**; **1**; **Ret**	FUJ; 2; 4	FUJ; 3; 6	SUZ; 1	SUZ; 2	SUZ; 3	AUT; 1; 9	AUT; 2 Ret	AUT; 3; 9	SUG; 1 Ret	SUG; 2; 8	SUG; 3 Ret	MOT; 1; 5	MOT; 2; 6	MOT; 3; 5	OKA; 1	OKA; 2	OKA; 3	8th	10

=== Complete Super GT results ===
(key) (Races in bold indicate pole position) (Races in italics indicate fastest lap)

Year	Team	Car	Class	1	2	3	4	5	6	7	8	DC	Pts
2020	Saitama Toyopet GreenBrave	Toyota GR Supra GT300	GT300	FUJ; 1	FUJ; 6	SUZ; 12	MOT; 25	FUJ; 4	SUZ; Ret	MOT; 4	**FUJ**; **1**	2nd	62
2021	Saitama Toyopet GreenBrave	Toyota GR Supra GT300	GT300	OKA; 3	FUJ; 27	MOT; 3	SUZ	SUG; 21	AUT; 3	MOT; 9	FUJ; 9	9th	34
2022	Saitama Toyopet GreenBrave	Toyota GR Supra GT300	GT300	OKA; Ret	FUJ; 9	SUZ; 4	FUJ; 14	SUZ; 4	SUG; 18	AUT; 1	MOT; 3	4th	48
2023	Saitama Toyopet GreenBrave	Toyota GR Supra GT300	GT300	OKA; 5	FUJ; 3	SUZ; 3	FUJ; 9	SUZ; Ret	SUG; 1	AUT; 1	MOT; 7	1st	74
2026	JLOC	Lamborghini Huracán GT3 Evo 2	GT300	OKA	FUJ; 12	FUJ	SUZ	SUG	AUT; 18	MOT	MOT	39th	4

Sporting positions
Preceded by João Paulo de Oliveira; Kiyoto Fujinami	Super GT; GT300 Champion; 2023; With: Hiroki Yoshida	Succeeded by Takashi Kogure; Yuya Motojima
