= Shigekazu Wakisaka =

Japanese racing driver

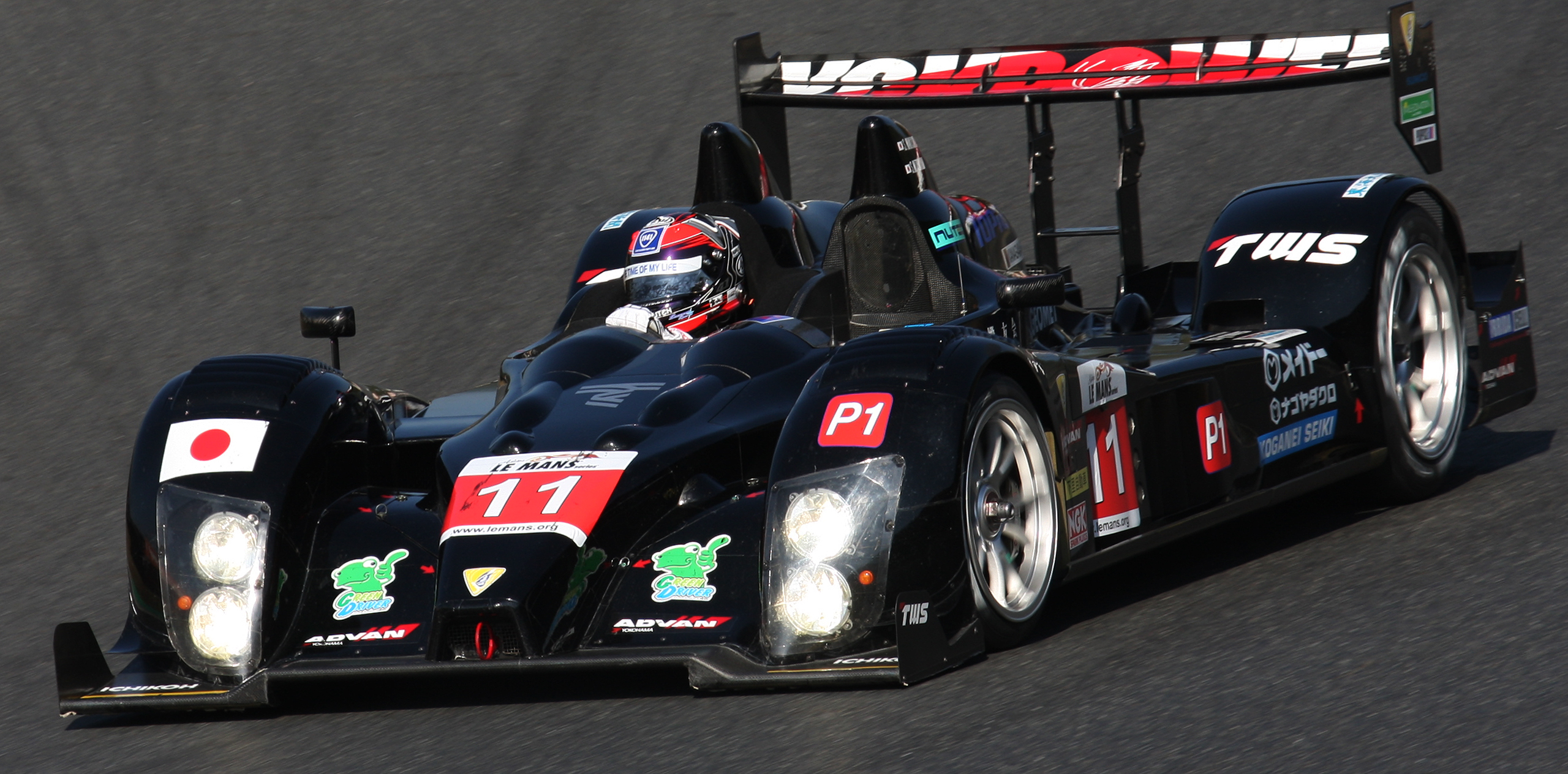
- Wakisaka in 2009
- Nationality: (Japan) Japanese
- Born: 1 April 1975 (age 51) Nara, Japan
- Relatives: Juichi Wakisaka (brother)
- Categorisation: FIA Platinum (until 2013); FIA Bronze (2018–)

Shigekazu Wakisaka (脇阪薫一, Wakisaka Shigekazu; born 1 April 1975 in Nara) is a Japanese racing driver. A long-term Toyota factory driver, he raced in Formula Nippon in the late 1990s before establishing himself in Super GT. He has twice won the Suzuka 1000 km. He also competed in LMP1.

In 2026, Wakisaka was appointed race advisor of OTG Motor Sports, the parent company of LM corsa.

Wakisaka's older brother, Juichi, is a three-time Super GT champion.

== Racing record ==
=== Complete Formula Nippon results ===
(key) (Races in bold indicate pole position) (Races in italics indicate fastest lap)

Year	Team	1	2	3	4	5	6	7	8	9	10	DC	Pts
1998	TEAM 5ZIGEN	SUZ; 10	MIN; Ret	FUJ; 10	MOT; 7	SUZ; Ret	SUG; 12	FUJ; C	MIN; Ret	FUJ; Ret	SUZ; 10	NC	0
1999	TEAM 5ZIGEN	SUZ; Ret	MOT; 9	MIN; Ret	FUJ	SUZ	SUG	FUJ	MIN	MOT	SUZ	NC	0
2000	MOONCRAFT	SUZ; 5	MOT; 8	MIN; Ret	FUJ; Ret	SUZ; Ret	SUG; 8	MOT; 13	FUJ; 9	MIN; Ret	SUZ; 8	12th	2

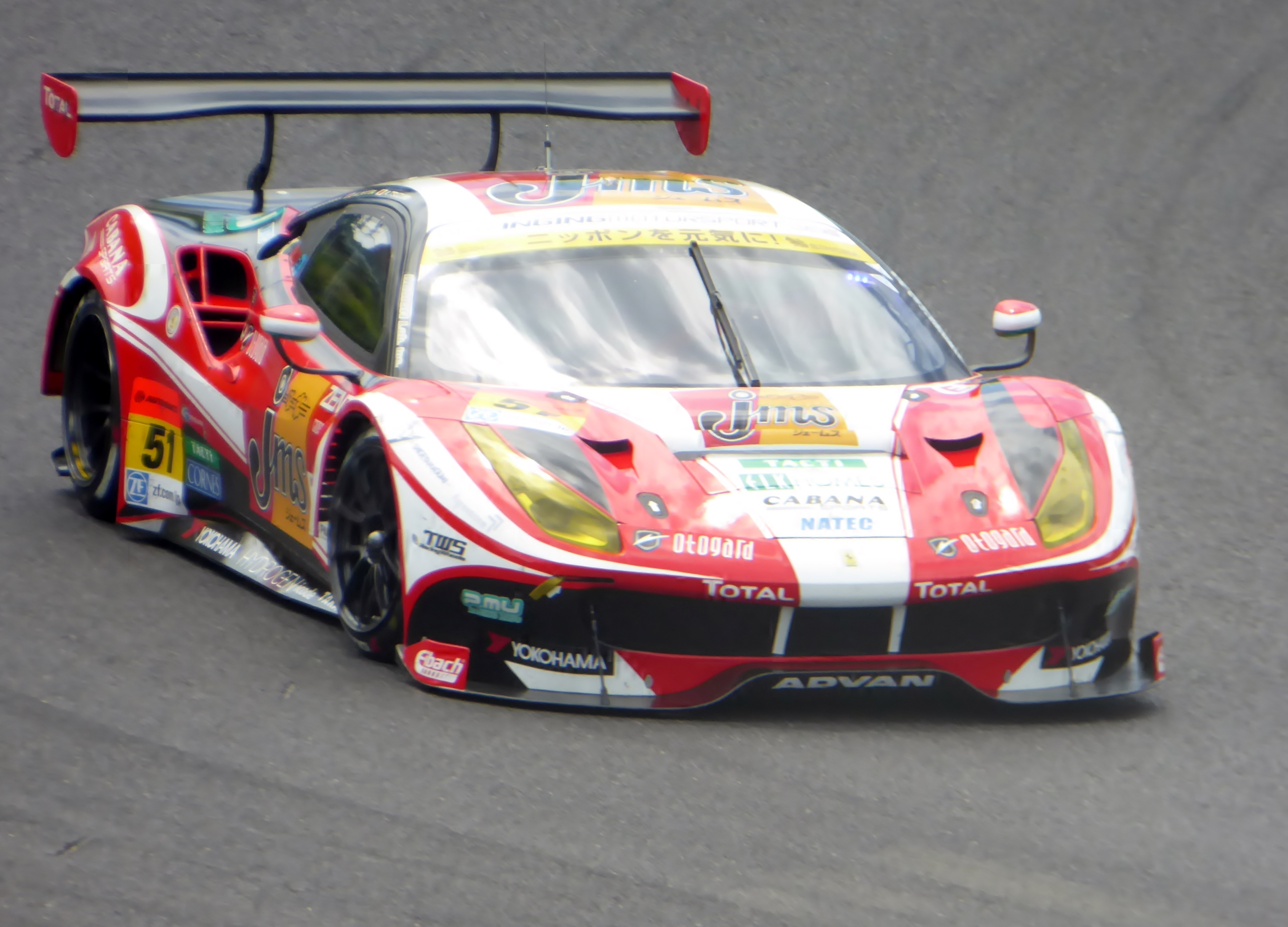
Wakisaka in his LM corsa Ferrari at Suzuka in 2016.

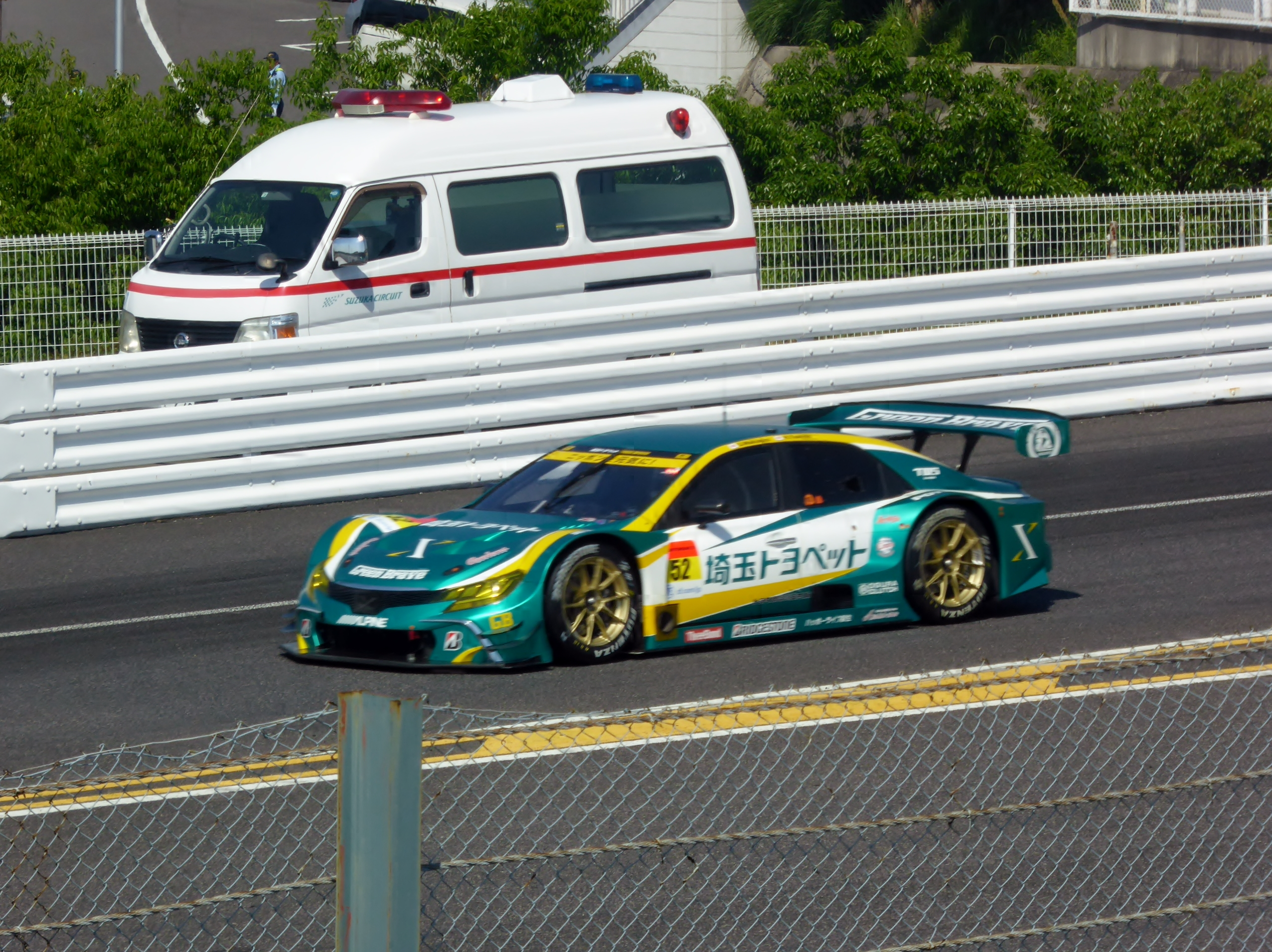
Wakisaka's Green Brave Toyota at Suzuka in 2019.

=== Complete JGTC/Super GT results ===
(key) (Races in bold indicate pole position) (Races in italics indicate fastest lap)

Year	Team	Car	Class	1	2	3	4	5	6	7	8	9	DC	Pts
2000	Racing Project Bandoh	Toyota Celica	GT300	MOT; 3	FUJ; Ret	SUG; 1	FUJ; Ret	TAI; 3	MIN; 14	SUZ; 17			6th	44
2001	Toyota Team Cerumo	Toyota Supra	GT500	TAI	FUJ	SUG	FUJ	MOT; 9	SUZ	MIN			24th	2
2002	Project Mu Kraft	Toyota Supra	GT500	TAI; 17	FUJ; 10	SUG; Ret	SEP; 12	FUJ; 10	MOT; 15	MIN; 10	SUZ; 12		25th	3
2003	Project Mu Kraft	Toyota Supra	GT500	TAI; 9	FUJ; 5	SUG; 6	FUJ; 10	FUJ; 10	MOT; 12	AUT; 7	SUZ; 10		15th	24
2004	Yellow Hat Kraft	Toyota Supra	GT500	TAI; 4	SUG; 5	SEP; 2	TOK; 9	**MOT**; 13	AUT; 8	SUZ; 16			10th	37
2005	Toyota Team Kraft	Toyota Supra	GT500	OKA; 9	FUJ; 3	SEP; 14	SUG; 10	MOT	FUJ	AUT	SUZ		17th	16
2006	Racing Project Bandoh	Toyota Celica	GT300	SUZ; 4	OKA; 10	FUJ; 17	SEP; 3	SUG; 18	SUZ; 19	MOT; 16	AUT; 12	FUJ; 2	10th	44
2007	MOLA	Nissan Fairlady Z	GT300	SUZ; 17	OKA; 14	FUJ; 11	SEP; 4	SUG; 2	SUZ; 8	MOT; 7	AUT; 4	FUJ; 14	9th	36
2008	Houzan Toyota Team Kraft	Lexus SC430	GT500	SUZ	OKA	FUJ	SEP	SUG	SUZ; DNP	MOT	AUT	FUJ	NC	0
2015	LM corsa	BMW Z4 GT3	GT300	OKA; 9	FUJ; 9	CHA	FUJ; 4	SUZ; Ret	SUG; 9	AUT; 17	MOT; 15		16th	14
2016	LM corsa	Ferrari 488 GT3	GT300	OKA	FUJ; 6	SUG	FUJ	SUZ; 11	CHA	MOT	MOT		20th	5
2017	Saitama Toyopet Green Brave	Toyota Mark X MC	GT300	OKA; Ret	FUJ; 27	AUT; 20	SUG; 14	SUZ; 23	FUJ; 12	BUR; 22	MOT; 20		NC	0
2018	Saitama Toyopet Green Brave	Toyota Mark X MC	GT300	OKA; 11	FUJ; 19	SUZ; 14	CHA; 17	FUJ; Ret	SUG; 7	AUT; 17	MOT; 13		19th	4
2019	Saitama Toyopet Green Brave	Toyota Mark X MC	GT300	OKA; 3	FUJ; 13	SUZ; 27	CHA; 23	**FUJ**; 2	AUT; 24	SUG; 8	MOT; 13		9th	27.5
2020	K-tunes Racing	Lexus RC F GT3	GT300	OKA	FUJ; 23	SUZ	CHA	SEP	SUG	AUT	MOT		NC	0
