= Hiroki Yoshida =

Japanese racing driver

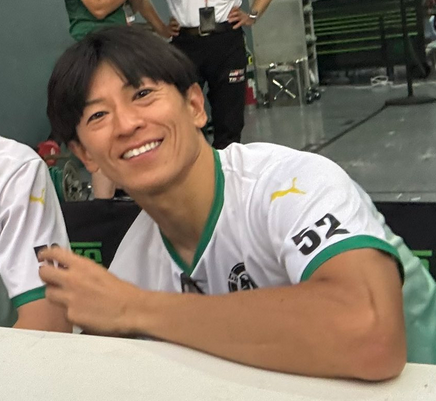
- Yoshida at the 2025 Super GT Malaysia Festival
- Nationality: (Japan) Japanese
- Born: December 21, 1983 (age 42) Kumamoto, Japan

Super GT GT300 career
- Debut season: 2011
- Current team: Saitama Green Brave
- Car number: 52
- Former teams: ThunderAsia Racing; A Speed; Tomei Sports; Gulf Racing with Pacific; Gainer
- Starts: 92
- Wins: 6
- Podiums: 15
- Poles: 2
- Fastest laps: 4
- Best finish: 1st in 2023

Championship titles
- 2005 2008 2023 2023: FJ1600; Super Taikyu (ST-1); Super GT (GT300); Super Taikyu (ST-Z)

Hiroki Yoshida (吉田広樹, Yoshida Hiroki; born December 21, 1983) is a Japanese racing driver. He currently competes in Super GT in the GT300 category and the Super Taikyu Series in the ST-Z category, both for Saitama Green Brave.

Yoshida won the 2023 Super GT Championship in the GT300 class and the 2023 Super Taikyu Championship in the ST-Z class.

== Career ==
=== Early career ===
Yoshida began his with racing career in 2004 competing in the J1600 Series, where he won the championship the following year. He then move to Formula Challenge Japan in 2006. In 2007, Yoshida began competing in the Super Taikyu Series and the following year, he took part with the Petronas Syntium Team where his team won the ST-1 championship. In 2010, he competed in the Japanese Formula 3 Championship, where he was signed to Hanashima Racing.

=== Super GT ===
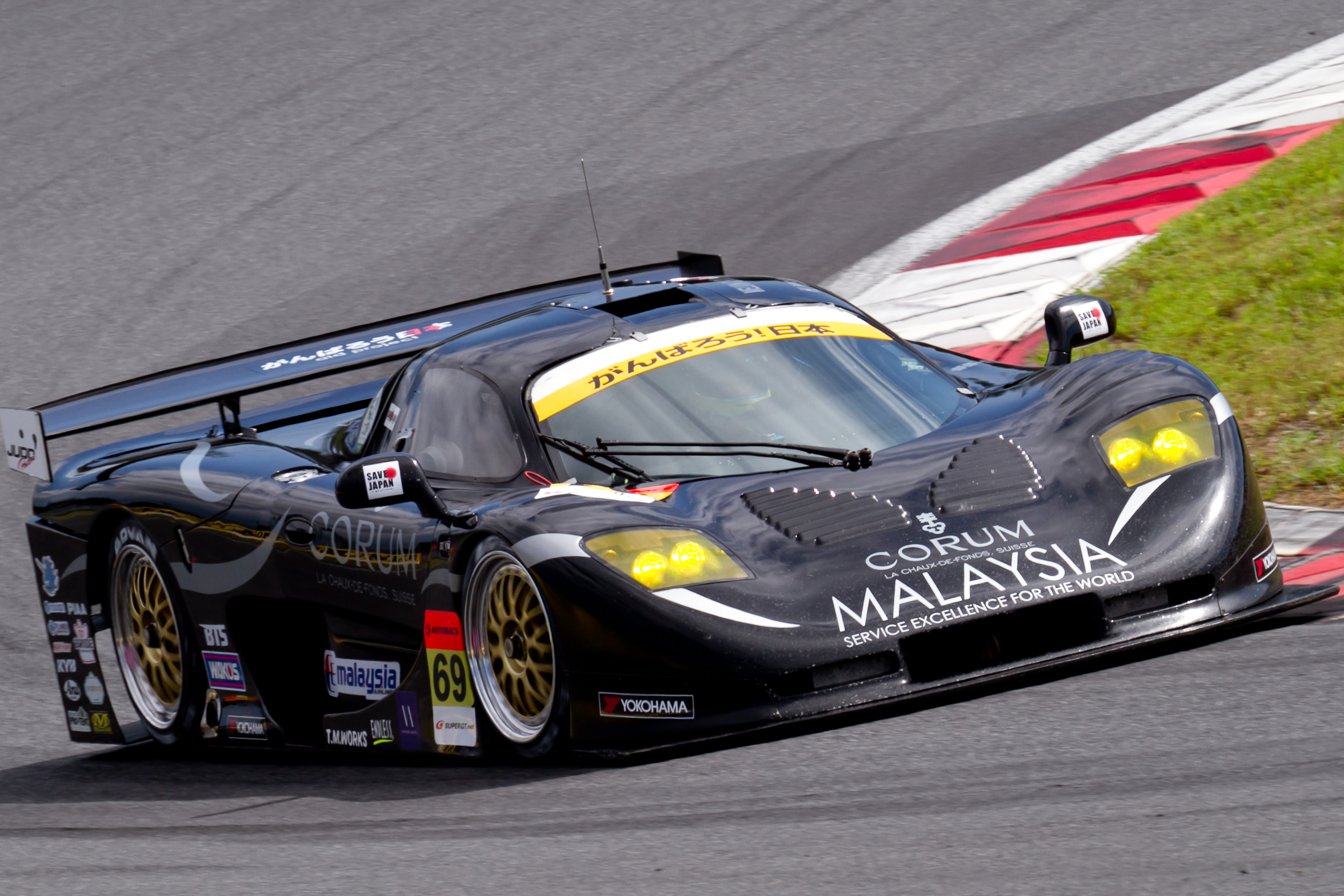
Yoshida racing for ThunderAsia Racing in 2011

In 2011, Yoshida began racing in the Super GT racing series in the GT300 class, driving for ThunderAsia Racing. He later moved to Team A Speed in 2012.

In 2014, Yoshida returned to Super GT, competing for Tomei Sports where he would race for them the following season. For the 2016 season, he signed with Gulf Racing with Pacific. In 2017, he signed with Gainer, remaining with the team the following season. In 2019, Yoshida transferred from Gainer to Green Brave, partnering with Shigekazu Wakisaka. The following season his team switched to a Toyota GR Supra GT300 and Kohta Kawaai would become his new teammate. Yoshida and Kawaai won two races and they finished second in the standings behind Kondo Racing of Kiyoto Fujinami and João Paulo de Oliveira. In 2022, they managed to clinch a win at Autopolis as well as another podium, and Yoshida himself finished 5th in the standings.

In 2023, Saitama Toyopet Green Brave retained both Yoshida and Kawaai and both of them claimed two wins and three podiums en route to their GT300 championship, which they clinched in the season finale.

== Racing record ==
=== Complete Super GT results ===
(key) (Races in bold indicate pole position) (Races in italics indicate fastest lap)

| Year | Team | Car | Class | 1 | 2 | 3 | 4 | 5 | 6 | 7 | 8 | 9 | Pos | Points |
|---|---|---|---|---|---|---|---|---|---|---|---|---|---|---|
| 2011 | ThunderAsia Racing | Mosler MT900M | GT300 | OKA; 15 | FUJ; 16 | SEP; 15 | SUG; Ret | SUZ; 18 | FUJ; 20 | AUT; 19 | MOT; 18 | | NC | 0 |
| 2012 | A speed | Aston Martin Vantage GT3 | GT300 | OKA | FUJ | SEP; Ret | SUG | SUZ; 1 | FUJ | AUT | MOT | | NC | 0 |
| 2014 | Tomei Sports | Nissan GT-R NISMO GT3 | GT300 | OKA; 16 | FUJ; 16 | AUT | SUG; 18 | FUJ; 24 | SUZ; 20 | BUR | MOT; 18 | | NC | 0 |
| 2015 | Tomei Sports | Nissan GT-R NISMO GT3 | GT300 | OKA; 24 | FUJ; 15 | BUR | FUJ; 21 | SUZ; Ret | SUG; Ret | AUT; 14 | MOT; 23 | | NC | 0 |
| 2016 | Gulf Racing with Pacific | Porsche 911 GT3R | GT300 | OKA; DNQ | FUJ; Ret | SUG; 13 | FUJ; 21 | SUZ; 13 | BUR; 17 | MOT; 22 | MOT; 8 | | 23rd | 3 |
| 2017 | GAINER | Nissan GT-R NISMO GT3 | GT300 | OKA; 6 | FUJ; 24 | AUT; 15 | SUG; 21 | FUJ; 16 | SUZ; 5 | BUR; 18 | MOT; 19 | | 18th | 13 |
| 2018 | GAINER | Nissan GT-R NISMO GT3 | GT300 | OKA; 13 | FUJ; 11 | SUZ; 10 | BUR; Ret | FUJ; 8 | SUG; 2 | AUT; 9 | MOT; 15 | | 16th | 22 |
| 2019 | Saitama Toyopet Green Brave | Toyota Mark X MC | GT300 | OKA; 3 | FUJ; 13 | SUZ; 27 | BUR; 23 | **FUJ**; 2 | AUT; 24 | SUG; 8 | MOT; 13 | | 9th | 27.5 |
| 2020 | Saitama Toyopet Green Brave | Toyota GR Supra GT300 | GT300 | FUJ; 1 | FUJ; 6 | SUZ; 12 | MOT; 25 | FUJ; 4 | SUZ; Ret | MOT; 4 | **FUJ**; 1 | | **2nd** | **62** |
| 2021 | Saitama Toyopet Green Brave | Toyota GR Supra GT300 | GT300 | OKA; 3 | FUJ; 27 | SUZ; 18 | MOT; 3 | SUG; 21 | AUT; 4 | MOT; 9 | FUJ; 9 | | 9th | 34 |
| 2022 | Saitama Toyopet Green Brave | Toyota GR Supra GT300 | GT300 | OKA; 26 | FUJ | SUZ; 4 | FUJ; 14 | SUZ; 4 | SUG; 18 | AUT; 1 | MOT; 3 | | 5th | 47 |
| 2023 | Saitama Toyopet Green Brave | Toyota GR Supra GT300 | GT300 | OKA; 5 | FUJ; 3 | SUZ; 3 | FUJ; 9 | SUZ; Ret | SUG; 1 | AUT; 1 | MOT; 7 | | 1st | 74 |
| 2024 | Saitama Green Brave | Toyota GR Supra GT300 | GT300 | OKA; 4 | FUJ; 3 | SUZ; 5 | FUJ; 23 | SUG; DNS | AUT; 18 | MOT; 7 | SUZ; 11 | | 9th | 29 |
| 2025 | Saitama Green Brave | Toyota GR Supra GT300 | GT300 | OKA; Ret | FUJ; 26 | SEP; 2 | FS1; 5 | FS2 (6) | SUZ; 6 | SUG; 6 | AUT; 7 | MOT; 5 | 7th | 70.5 |
| 2026 | Saitama Green Brave | Toyota GR Supra GT300 | GT300 | OKA; 8 | FUJ; 9 | FUJ; 1 | SUZ; 27† | SUG; 20 | AUT; Ret | MOT; WD | MOT; WD | | 18th | 40 |

^{*} Season still in progress.

Sporting positions
| Preceded by João Paulo de Oliveira; Kiyoto Fujinami | Super GT; GT300 Champion; 2023; With: Kohta Kawaai | Succeeded by Takashi Kogure; Yuya Motojima |
