= Saitama Green Brave =

Japanese racing team

- Founded: 2012
- Base: Saitama Prefecture
- Team principal(s): Hiroshi Aoyagi
- Founder(s): Saitama Toyopet
- Current series: Super GT
- Former series: Super Taikyu; F4 Japanese Championship
- Current drivers: Hiroki Yoshida; Seita Nonaka
- Teams' Championships: 2023 Super GT (GT300); 2023 Super Taikyu (ST-Z); 2024 Super Taikyu (ST-Z)
- Drivers' Championships: 2023 Super GT (GT300)
- Website: www.saitama-toyopet.co.jp/greenbrave

Saitama Green Brave (formerly known as Saitama Toyopet Green Brave) is a Japanese racing team who competes in Super GT and Super Taikyu championship. Green Brave recently is best known for winning the 2023 Super GT title in the GT300 class with Hiroki Yoshida and Kohta Kawaai.

== History ==
After searching for ways to enjoy the Toyota 86, which was released in 2012, Saitama Toyopet a car dealer company based in Saitama Prefecture came up with the idea that "If car sellers don't know how to enjoy cars, they won't be able to tell customers how to enjoy cars." then established their Motor Sports Department. The company decided to participate in a race competition. For this reason, the roles of team representative, chief engineer, and mechanic are all Saitama Toyopet employees. The drivers are not only professionals, but also the managing director, Takayuki Hiranuma, who has experience in racing karts, will be at the wheel himself. The company named it Green Brave after the company's main color green.

In addition to Super Taikyu, and Super GT, the team actively participates in many large and small races such as the TOYOTA GAZOO Racing 86/BRZ Race and OKAYAMA Challenge Cup.

=== Super Taikyu ===
In 2013, they began participating in the Super Taikyu ST-4 class, with a Toyota 86, and achieved their first victory in 2015, their third year. They won the championship that same year. They debuted in the ST-3 class in 2017, racing with the Toyota Mark X.

=== Super GT – GT300 ===
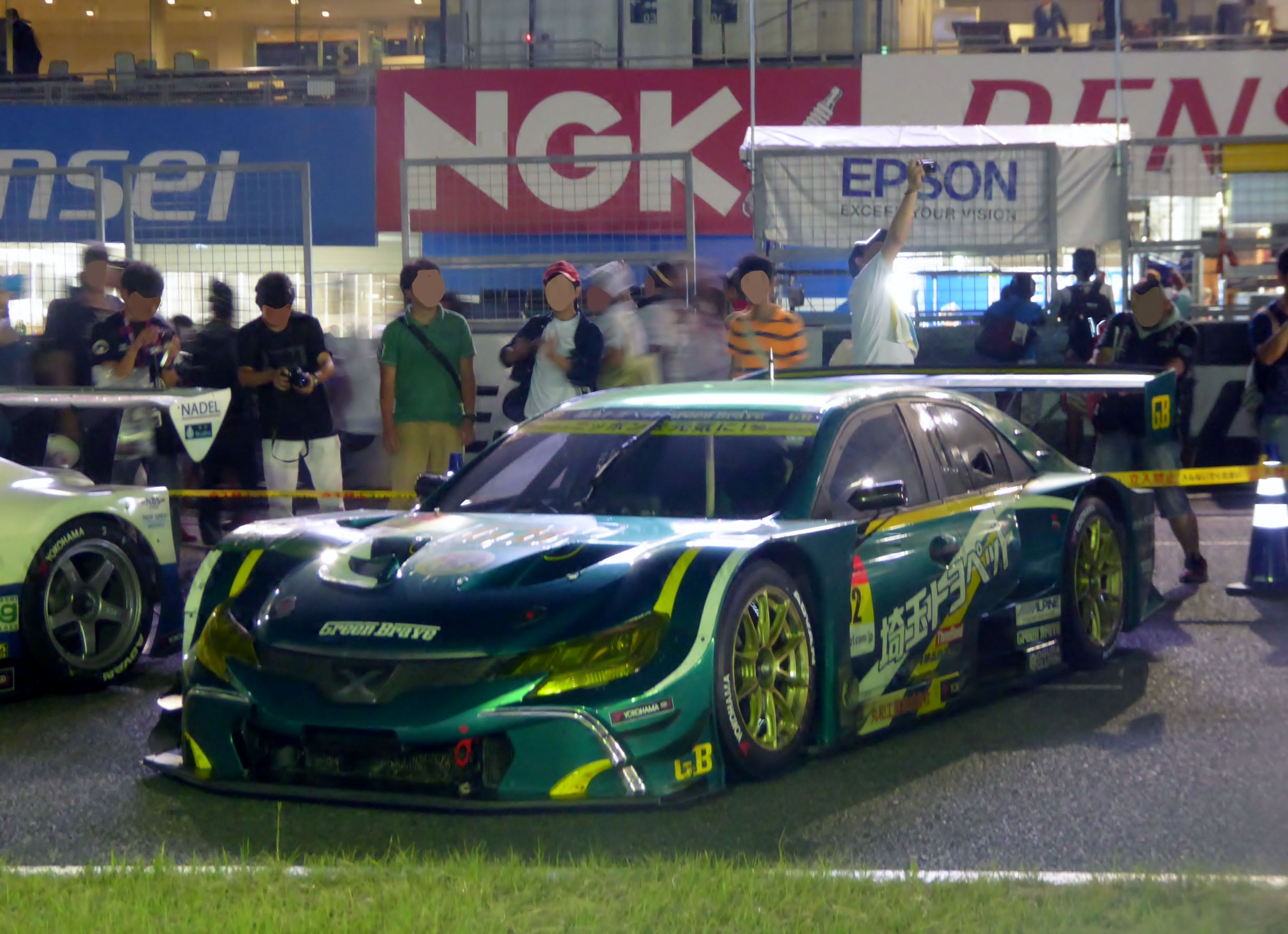
Toyota Mark X MC made its debut in the GT300 class in 2017.

In 2017, the team stepped up to the Super GT's GT300 class, and became the 6th team in the series with a mother chassis which they used to develop the Toyota Mark X with a GTA V8 4.5 L V8. Taku Bamba & Shigekazu Wakisaka were the drivers for that season. For 2019, Hiroki Yoshida joined the team replacing Bamba. The team achieved their first podiums in 2019, at Okayama and the second race at Fuji. From 2020 GreenBrave have been fielding the fifth-generation Toyota GR Supra in the GT300 Class. Built to JAF-GT GT300 regulations, the GT300 GR Supra is powered by Toyota's 5.4 litre 2UR-GSE V8 engine. FIA F4 Japanese graduate Kohta Kawaai signed with the team for the 2020 Season, replacing Wakisaka. For 2021, the team retained the same line up, with Kawaai skipping the second round due to COVID, and Taku Bamba filled the seat. In 2023, The team achieved their first championship along with Yoshida, and Kawaai with two wins and four podiums.

For 2024, Saitama Toyopet GreenBrave changed its official name to Saitama Green Brave. Toyota Gazoo Racing Driver Challenge (TGR-DC) member Seita Nonaka, is set to replace reigning GT300 champion Kohta Kawaai, after spending the last two seasons at Hoppy Team Tsuchiya and entering as the team's third driver last year in Autopolis.
