= 2017 Suzuka 1000km =

Layout of the Suzuka International Racing Course

The 46th International Suzuka 1000 km was endurance event that took place on August 27, 2017 at the Suzuka Circuit in Suzuka City, Japan. It was the 46th edition of the 1000 km Suzuka at Suzuka, and the last as part of the Super GT Series, also being the last running under the 1000-kilometer format. The race was won by the Nakajima Racing team with Bertrand Baguette and Kosuke Matsuura driving.

== Results ==
Class winners are denoted in bold and ‡.

Pos	Class	No.	Team	Drivers	Chassis	Laps	Time/Gap To/Reason Retired
Pos	Class	No.	Team	Drivers	Engine	Laps	Time/Gap To/Reason Retired
1	**GT500**	**64**	**(Japan) Nakajima Racing**	**(Belgium) Bertrand Baguette (Japan) Kosuke Matsuura**	**Honda NSX-GT**	**171**	‡
1	**GT500**	**64**	**(Japan) Nakajima Racing**	**(Belgium) Bertrand Baguette (Japan) Kosuke Matsuura**	**Honda 2.0L I4 Turbo**	**171**	‡
2	GT500	23	(Japan) NISMO	(Japan) Tsugio Matsuda (Italy) Ronnie Quintarelli	Nissan GT-R	171	+12.150s
2	GT500	23	(Japan) NISMO	(Japan) Tsugio Matsuda (Italy) Ronnie Quintarelli	Nissan 2.0L I4 Turbo	171	+12.150s
3	GT500	100	(Japan) Team Kunimitsu	(Japan) Naoki Yamamoto (Japan) Takuya Izawa	Honda NSX-GT	171	+15.737s
3	GT500	100	(Japan) Team Kunimitsu	(Japan) Naoki Yamamoto (Japan) Takuya Izawa	Honda 2.0L I4 Turbo	171	+15.737s
4	GT500	19	(Japan) Lexus Team WedsSport Bandoh	(Japan) Yuhi Sekiguchi (Japan) Yuji Kunimoto (Japan) Kamui Kobayashi	Lexus LC 500	171	+32.852s
4	GT500	19	(Japan) Lexus Team WedsSport Bandoh	(Japan) Yuhi Sekiguchi (Japan) Yuji Kunimoto (Japan) Kamui Kobayashi	Lexus 2.0L I4 Turbo	171	+32.852s
5	GT500	24	(Japan) Kondo Racing	(Japan) Daiki Sasaki (Brazil) João Paulo de Oliveira	Nissan GT-R	171	+34.089s
5	GT500	24	(Japan) Kondo Racing	(Japan) Daiki Sasaki (Brazil) João Paulo de Oliveira	Nissan 2.0L I4 Turbo	171	+34.089s
6	GT500	37	(Japan) Lexus Team KeePer TOM's	(Japan) Ryō Hirakawa (New Zealand) Nick Cassidy	Lexus LC 500	171	+36.330s
6	GT500	37	(Japan) Lexus Team KeePer TOM's	(Japan) Ryō Hirakawa (New Zealand) Nick Cassidy	Lexus 2.0L I4 Turbo	171	+36.330s
7	GT500	6	(Japan) Lexus Team LeMans Wako's	(Japan) Kazuya Oshima (Italy) Andrea Caldarelli	Lexus LC 500	171	+37.012s
7	GT500	6	(Japan) Lexus Team LeMans Wako's	(Japan) Kazuya Oshima (Italy) Andrea Caldarelli	Lexus 2.0L I4 Turbo	171	+37.012s
8	GT500	8	(Japan) Autobacs Racing Team Aguri	(Japan) Tomoki Nojiri (Japan) Takashi Kobayashi	Honda NSX-GT	171	+1:58.420s
8	GT500	8	(Japan) Autobacs Racing Team Aguri	(Japan) Tomoki Nojiri (Japan) Takashi Kobayashi	Honda 2.0L I4 Turbo	171	+1:58.420s
9	GT500	36	(Japan) Lexus Team au TOM's	(Japan) Kazuki Nakajima (United Kingdom) James Rossiter	Lexus LC 500	170	+1 lap
9	GT500	36	(Japan) Lexus Team au TOM's	(Japan) Kazuki Nakajima (United Kingdom) James Rossiter	Lexus 2.0L I4 Turbo	170	+1 lap
10	GT500	38	(Japan) Lexus Team ZENT Cerumo	(Japan) Yuji Tachikawa (Japan) Hiroaki Ishiura	Lexus LC 500	169	+2 laps
10	GT500	38	(Japan) Lexus Team ZENT Cerumo	(Japan) Yuji Tachikawa (Japan) Hiroaki Ishiura	Lexus 2.0L I4 Turbo	169	+2 laps
11	GT500	12	(Japan) Team Impul	(Japan) Hironobu Yasuda (United Kingdom) Jann Mardenborough	Nissan GT-R	169	+2 Laps
11	GT500	12	(Japan) Team Impul	(Japan) Hironobu Yasuda (United Kingdom) Jann Mardenborough	Nissan 2.0L I4 Turbo	169	+2 Laps
12	GT500	16	(Japan) Team Mugen	(Japan) Hideki Mutoh (Japan) Daisuke Nakajima (United Kingdom) Jenson Button	Honda NSX-GT	169	+2 Laps
12	GT500	16	(Japan) Team Mugen	(Japan) Hideki Mutoh (Japan) Daisuke Nakajima (United Kingdom) Jenson Button	Honda 2.0L I4 Turbo	169	+2 Laps
13	GT500	1	(Japan) Lexus Team SARD	(Finland) Heikki Kovalainen (Japan) Kohei Hirate	Lexus LC 500	168	DNF (Accident)
13	GT500	1	(Japan) Lexus Team SARD	(Finland) Heikki Kovalainen (Japan) Kohei Hirate	Lexus 2.0L I4 Turbo	168	DNF (Accident)
14	**GT300**	**65**	**(Japan) K2 R&D Leon Racing**	**(Japan) Haruki Kurosawa (Japan) Naoya Gamou**	**Mercedes-AMG GT3**	**158**	**+13 laps**
14	**GT300**	**65**	**(Japan) K2 R&D Leon Racing**	**(Japan) Haruki Kurosawa (Japan) Naoya Gamou**	**Mercedes-Benz 6.2L V8 N/A**	**158**	**+13 laps**
15	GT300	88	(Japan) JLOC	(Japan) Manabu Orido (Japan) Kazuki Hiramine (Japan) Koji Yamanishi	Lamborghini Huracan	158	+13 Laps
15	GT300	88	(Japan) JLOC	(Japan) Manabu Orido (Japan) Kazuki Hiramine (Japan) Koji Yamanishi	Lamborghini 5.2L V10 N/A	158	+13 Laps
16	GT300	87	(Japan) JLOC	(Japan) Shinya Hosokawa (Japan) Kimiya Sato (Japan) Yuya Motojima	Lamborghini Huracan	158	+13 Laps
16	GT300	87	(Japan) JLOC	(Japan) Shinya Hosokawa (Japan) Kimiya Sato (Japan) Yuya Motojima	Lamborghini 5.2L V10 N/A	158	+13 Laps
17	GT300	60	(Japan) LM Corsa	(Japan) Akira Iida (Japan) Hiroki Yoshimoto	Lexus RC F GT3	158	+13 Laps
17	GT300	60	(Japan) LM Corsa	(Japan) Akira Iida (Japan) Hiroki Yoshimoto	Lexus 5.4L V8 N/A	158	+13 Laps
18	GT300	10	(Japan) GAINER	(Japan) Ryuichiro Tomita (Japan) Hiroki Yoshida	Nissan GT-R	158	+13 Laps
18	GT300	10	(Japan) GAINER	(Japan) Ryuichiro Tomita (Japan) Hiroki Yoshida	Nissan 3.8L V6 Twin Turbo	158	+13 Laps
19	GT300	51	(Japan) LM Corsa	(Japan) Yuichi Nakayama (Japan) Sho Tsuboi	Lexus RC F GT3	158	+13 Laps
19	GT300	51	(Japan) LM Corsa	(Japan) Yuichi Nakayama (Japan) Sho Tsuboi	Lexus 5.4L V8 N/A	158	+13 Laps
20	GT300	61	(Japan) R&D Sport	(Japan) Takuto Iguchi (Japan) Hideki Yamauchi	Subaru BRZ GT300	158	+13 Laps
20	GT300	61	(Japan) R&D Sport	(Japan) Takuto Iguchi (Japan) Hideki Yamauchi	Subaru 2.0L Flat 4 Turbo	158	+13 Laps
21	GT300	9	(Japan) Pacific with Gulf Racing	(New Zealand) Jono Lester (Japan) Kyosuke Mineo	Porsche 991 GT3 R	158	+13 Laps
21	GT300	9	(Japan) Pacific with Gulf Racing	(New Zealand) Jono Lester (Japan) Kyosuke Mineo	Porsche 4.0L Flat 6 N/A	158	+13 Laps
22	GT300	11	(Japan) GAINER	(Japan) Katsuyuki Hiranaka (Sweden) Björn Wirdheim	Mercedes-AMG GT3	158	+13 Laps
22	GT300	11	(Japan) GAINER	(Japan) Katsuyuki Hiranaka (Sweden) Björn Wirdheim	Mercedes-Benz 6.2L V8 N/A	158	+13 Laps
23	GT300	33	(Japan) D'station Racing	(Japan) Tomonobu Fujii (Germany) Sven Müller	Porsche 991 GT3 R	158	+13 Laps
23	GT300	33	(Japan) D'station Racing	(Japan) Tomonobu Fujii (Germany) Sven Müller	Porsche 4.0L Flat 6 N/A	158	+13 Laps
24	GT300	7	(Japan) BMW Team Studie	(Germany) Jörg Müller (Japan) Seiji Ara (Brazil) Augusto Farfus	BMW M6	158	+13 laps
24	GT300	7	(Japan) BMW Team Studie	(Germany) Jörg Müller (Japan) Seiji Ara (Brazil) Augusto Farfus	BMW 4.4L V8 Twin Turbo	158	+13 laps
25	GT300	52	(Japan) Saitama Toyopet GreenBrave	(Japan) Taku Bamba (Japan) Shigekazu Wakisaka (Japan) Shogo Mitsuyama	Toyota Mark X	157	+14 laps
25	GT300	52	(Japan) Saitama Toyopet GreenBrave	(Japan) Taku Bamba (Japan) Shigekazu Wakisaka (Japan) Shogo Mitsuyama	GTA Nissan 4.5L V8 N/A	157	+14 laps
26	GT300	111	(Japan) Rn-sports	(Japan) Keishi Ishikawa (Japan) Ryosei Yamashita (Japan) Masayuki Ueda	Mercedes-AMG GT3	156	+15 laps
26	GT300	111	(Japan) Rn-sports	(Japan) Keishi Ishikawa (Japan) Ryosei Yamashita (Japan) Masayuki Ueda	Mercedes-Benz 6.2L V8 N/A	156	+15 laps
27	GT300	3	(Japan) NDDP Racing	(Japan) Kazuki Hoshino (Japan) Mitsunori Takaboshi	Nissan GT-R Nismo GT3	156	+15 laps
27	GT300	3	(Japan) NDDP Racing	(Japan) Kazuki Hoshino (Japan) Mitsunori Takaboshi	Nissan 3.8L V6 Twin Turbo	156	+15 laps
28	GT500	46	(Japan) MOLA	(Japan) Satoshi Motoyama (Japan) Katsumasa Chiyo	Nissan GT-R R35	155	+16 laps
28	GT500	46	(Japan) MOLA	(Japan) Satoshi Motoyama (Japan) Katsumasa Chiyo	Nissan 2.0L I4 Turbo	155	+16 laps
29	GT300	18	(Japan) Team UPGarage With Bandoh	(Japan) Yuhki Nakayama (Japan) Shintaro Kawabata	Toyota 86 MC	155	+16 laps
29	GT300	18	(Japan) Team UPGarage With Bandoh	(Japan) Yuhki Nakayama (Japan) Shintaro Kawabata	GTA Nissan 4.5L V8 N/A	155	+16 laps
30	GT300	50	(Japan) INGING & Arnage Racing	(Japan) Akihiro Tsuzuki (Japan) Morio Nitta	Ferrari 488	155	+16 laps
30	GT300	50	(Japan) INGING & Arnage Racing	(Japan) Akihiro Tsuzuki (Japan) Morio Nitta	Ferrari 3.9L V8 Twin Turbo	155	+16 laps
31	GT300	360	(Japan) Tomei Sports	(Japan) Yusaku Shibata (Japan) Atsushi Tanaka (Japan) Takayuki Aoki	Nissan GT-R Nismo GT3	155	+16 laps
31	GT300	360	(Japan) Tomei Sports	(Japan) Yusaku Shibata (Japan) Atsushi Tanaka (Japan) Takayuki Aoki	Nissan 3.8L V6 Twin Turbo	155	+16 laps
32	GT300	25	(Japan) VivaC Team Tsuchiya	(Japan) Takamitsu Matsui (Japan) Kenta Yamashita (Japan) Tsubasa Kondo	Toyota 86 MC	154	DNF (Accident)
32	GT300	25	(Japan) VivaC Team Tsuchiya	(Japan) Takamitsu Matsui (Japan) Kenta Yamashita (Japan) Tsubasa Kondo	GTA Nissan 4.5L V8 N/A	154	DNF (Accident)
33	GT300	4	(Japan) Goodsmile Racing & Team UKYO	(Japan) Nobuteru Taniguchi (Japan) Tatsuya Kataoka	Mercedes-AMG GT3	153	+18 laps
33	GT300	4	(Japan) Goodsmile Racing & Team UKYO	(Japan) Nobuteru Taniguchi (Japan) Tatsuya Kataoka	Mercedes-Benz 6.2L V8 N/A	153	+18 laps
34	GT300	35	Panther Team Thailand	(Thailand) Nattavude Charoensukhawatana (Thailand) Nattapong Hortongkum	Toyota 86 MC	148	+23 laps
34	GT300	35	Panther Team Thailand	(Thailand) Nattavude Charoensukhawatana (Thailand) Nattapong Hortongkum	GTA Nissan 4.5L V8 N/A	148	+23 laps
35	GT500	17	(Japan) Keihin Real Racing	(Japan) Koudai Tsukakoshi (Japan) Takashi Kogure	Honda NSX-GT	146	DNF (Tyre)
35	GT500	17	(Japan) Keihin Real Racing	(Japan) Koudai Tsukakoshi (Japan) Takashi Kogure	Honda 2.0L I4 Turbo	146	DNF (Tyre)
36	GT300	22	(Japan) R'Qs Motor Sports	(Japan) Hisashi Wada (Japan) Masaki Jyonai	Mercedes-Benz SLS AMG GT3	127	+44 laps
36	GT300	22	(Japan) R'Qs Motor Sports	(Japan) Hisashi Wada (Japan) Masaki Jyonai	Mercedes-Benz 6.2L V8 N/A	127	+44 laps
37	GT300	5	(Japan) Team Mach	(Japan) Natsu Sakaguchi (Japan) Kiyoto Fujinami (Japan) Tetsuji Tamanaka	Toyota 86	119	+52 laps
37	GT300	5	(Japan) Team Mach	(Japan) Natsu Sakaguchi (Japan) Kiyoto Fujinami (Japan) Tetsuji Tamanaka	GTA Nissan 4.5L V8 N/A	119	+52 laps
38	GT300	2	(Japan) Cars Tokai Dream28	(Japan) Kazuho Takahashi (Japan) Hiroki Katoh (Japan) Hiroshi Hamaguchi	Lotus Evora MC	116	+55 laps
38	GT300	2	(Japan) Cars Tokai Dream28	(Japan) Kazuho Takahashi (Japan) Hiroki Katoh (Japan) Hiroshi Hamaguchi	GTA Nissan 4.5L V8 N/A	116	+55 laps
39	GT300	30	(Japan) apr	(Japan) Hiroaki Nagai (Japan) Kota Sasaki	Toyota Prius	113	DNF (Drive Train)
39	GT300	30	(Japan) apr	(Japan) Hiroaki Nagai (Japan) Kota Sasaki	Toyota 3.4L V8 N/A	113	DNF (Drive Train)
40	GT300	48	(Japan) Dijon Racing	(Japan) Hiroshi Takamori (Japan) Masaki Tanaka (Japan) Masami Kageyama	Nissan GT-R Nismo GT3	109	DNF (Drive Train)
40	GT300	48	(Japan) Dijon Racing	(Japan) Hiroshi Takamori (Japan) Masaki Tanaka (Japan) Masami Kageyama	Nissan 3.8L V6 Twin Turbo	109	DNF (Drive Train)
41	GT300	31	(Japan) apr	(Japan) Koki Saga (Japan) Rintaro Kubo	Toyota Prius	86	DNF (Accident)
41	GT300	31	(Japan) apr	(Japan) Koki Saga (Japan) Rintaro Kubo	Toyota 3.4L V8 N/A	86	DNF (Accident)
42	GT300	21	(Japan) Audi Team Hitotsuyama	(United Kingdom) Richard Lyons (Japan) Masataka Yanagida	Audi R8	72	DNF (Electrics)
42	GT300	21	(Japan) Audi Team Hitotsuyama	(United Kingdom) Richard Lyons (Japan) Masataka Yanagida	Audi 5.2L V10 N/A	72	DNF (Electrics)
43	GT300	26	(Japan) Team Taisan SARD	(Japan) Shinnosuke Yamada (Australia) Jake Parsons (Austria) Christian Klien	Audi R8	47	DNF (Accident Damage)
43	GT300	26	(Japan) Team Taisan SARD	(Japan) Shinnosuke Yamada (Australia) Jake Parsons (Austria) Christian Klien	Audi 5.2L V10 N/A	47	DNF (Accident Damage)
44	GT300	55	(Japan) Autobacs Racing Team Aguri	(Japan) Shinichi Takagi (United Kingdom) Sean Walkinshaw	BMW M6	37	DNF (Accident)
44	GT300	55	(Japan) Autobacs Racing Team Aguri	(Japan) Shinichi Takagi (United Kingdom) Sean Walkinshaw	BMW 4.4L V8 Twin Turbo	37	DNF (Accident)
45	GT300	117	(Japan) EIcars Bentley TTO	(Japan) Yuji Ide (Japan) Ryohei Sakaguchi	Bentley Continental GT	29	DNF (Fuel Lines)
45	GT300	117	(Japan) EIcars Bentley TTO	(Japan) Yuji Ide (Japan) Ryohei Sakaguchi	Bentley 4.0L V8 Twin Turbo	29	DNF (Fuel Lines)
