= Keishi Ishikawa =

Japanese racing driver from Yokohama (born 1994)

- Nationality: Japan
- Born: August 31, 1994 (age 32) Osaka, Japan

Super GT GT300 career
- Debut season: 2016
- Current team: GAINER
- Car number: 11
- Former teams: Pacific with Gulf Racing, Rn Sports
- Starts: 64
- Wins: 2
- Podiums: 4
- Poles: 0
- Fastest laps: 1
- Best finish: 7th in 2022

Previous series
- 2015-2016: Japanese Formula 3 Championship

Keishi Ishikawa (石川 京侍朗, Ishikawa Keishi) (born August 30, 1994) is a Japanese racing driver who currently competes in Super GT with GAINER.

== Career ==
=== Super GT ===
Ishikawa made his debut in the GT300 class of Super GT in 2016 for one round with Rn-sports. He made his full season debut next season as he raced with Rn-sports paired with Ryosei Yamashita.

In 2018, Ishikawa moved to Pacific with Gulf Racing, partnering Rintaro Kubo as they drove a Porsche 911 GT3 R. Ishikawa then moved to GAINER with Kazuki Hoshino. That season Hoshino and Ishikawa wins a race.

After Kazuki Hoshino left the team in the end of 2021, Ishikawa paired with Hironobu Yasuda for the 2022 season. Ishikawa then change partners within the GAINER team for 2023 season, with Ryuichiro Tomita paired together with third driver Yusuke Shiotsu. He won his second Super GT with together with Tomita at Fuji Speedway. He stayed with Tomita, and raced with the team's Nissan Z GT300.

== Racing record ==
=== Career summary ===
Season	Series	Team	Races	Wins	Poles	FLaps	Podiums	Points	Position
2015	Japanese Formula 3 Championship	Toda Racing	17	0	0	0	1	20	7th
2016	Japanese Formula 3 Championship	Toda Racing	17	0	0	0	0	22	8th
2016	Super GT - GT300	Rn-sports	1	0	0	0	0	0	NA
2017	Super GT - GT300	Rn-sports	7	0	0	0	0	0	NA
2018	Super GT - GT300	Pacific with Gulf Racing	8	0	0	0	0	5	17th
2019	Super GT - GT300	GAINER	8	1	0	1	1	22	14th
2020	Super GT - GT300	GAINER	8	0	0	0	0	22	12th
2020	Super Taikyu - ST-4	Hayashi Telempu SHADE Racing	5	2	1	0	5	113.5‡	**2nd‡**
2021	Super GT - GT300	GAINER	8	0	0	0	0	13	18th
2021	Super Taikyu - ST-4	Hayashi Telempu SHADE Racing	6	3	0	1	6	130‡	**1st‡**
2022	Super GT - GT300	GAINER	8	0	0	0	2	35	7th
2022	Super Taikyu - ST-4	SHADE Racing	6	0	3	0	1	56‡	7th‡
2023	Super GT - GT300	GAINER	8	1	0	0	1	28	12th
2023	Super Taikyu - ST-Z	Naniwa Denso Team Impul							
2024	Super GT - GT300	GAINER	8	0	0	0	0	8	17th
2024	Super Taikyu - ST-Z	Naniwa Denso Team Impul							
2025	Super Taikyu - ST-Z	Porsche Team EBI							
2025	Super Taikyu - ST-5R	Over Drive							
2026	Super Taikyu - ST-Z	Kokusai Group Sports Team							

=== Complete Super GT results ===
(key) (Races in bold indicate pole position) (Races in italics indicate fastest lap)

Year	Team	Car	Class	1	2	3	4	5	6	7	8	DC	Points
2016	Rn-sports	Mercedes-AMG GT3	GT300	OKA	FUJ1	SUG	FUJ2	SUZ; 15	BUR	MOT1	MOT2	NC	0
2017	Rn-sports	Mercedes-AMG GT3	GT300	OKA; 16	FUJ1; 18	AUT; 25	SUG; Ret	FUJ2; 15	SUZ; 13	BUR	MOT; 23	NC	0
2018	Pacific with Gulf Racing	Porsche 911 GT3 R	GT300	OKA; 16	FUJ1; 17	BUR; 15	FUJ2; 16	SUZ; 15	AUT; 6	SUG; 11	MOT; 12	17th	5
2019	GAINER	Nissan GT-R Nismo GT3	GT300	OKA; Ret	FSW; 10	SUZ; 12	CHA; 1	FSW; 14	AUT; 10	SUG; 15	TRM; 16	14th	22
2020	GAINER	Nissan GT-R Nismo GT3	GT300	FSW; 5	FSW; 10	SUZ; 5	TRM; 11	FSW; 12	SUZ; 21	TRM; 7	FSW; 6	12th	22
2021	GAINER	Nissan GT-R Nismo GT3	GT300	OKA; 10	FUJ1; 5	MOT1; 14	SUZ; 11	SUG; 26	AUT; 7	MOT2; 10	FUJ2; 10	18th	13
2022	GAINER	Nissan GT-R Nismo GT3	GT300	OKA; 10	FUJ1; 4	SUZ1; Ret	FUJ2; 2	SUZ2; 16	SUG; 2	AUT; 14	MOT; 14	7th	35
2023	GAINER	Nissan GT-R Nismo GT3	GT300	OKA; Ret	FUJ1; 17	SUZ1; 5	FUJ2; 1	SUZ2; 15	SUG; 12	AUT; 9	MOT; 13	12th	28
2024	GAINER	Nissan Fairlady Z GT300 (RZ34)	GT300	OKA; WD	FUJ1; Ret	SUZ1; Ret	FUJ2; 10	SUG; Ret	AUT; 7	MOT; 23†	SUZ2; 8	17th	8
