= 2018 Super Taikyu Series =

Car racing series

The 2018 Super Taikyu Series was the 27th season of the Super Taikyu Series. The season will start on 31 March at Suzuka Circuit and end on 4 November at Okayama International Circuit. #99 GTNET Motorsports is the Champion and the 4th overall title for a Nissan GTR GT3

== Teams and drivers ==
Entrant	Vehicle	No	Drivers	Rounds
ST–X
(Japan) Endless Sports	Nissan GT-R Nismo GT3	3	(Japan) Yukinori Taniguchi	1–4, 6
(Japan) Endless Sports	Nissan GT-R Nismo GT3	3	(Japan) Hideki Yamauchi	All
(Japan) Endless Sports	Nissan GT-R Nismo GT3	3	(Japan) Tsubasa Mekaru	All
(Japan) Endless Sports	Nissan GT-R Nismo GT3	3	(Japan) Kyosuke Mineo	3
(Japan) Endless Sports	Nissan GT-R Nismo GT3	3	(Japan) Shinnosuke Yamada	3
(Japan) Endless Sports	Nissan GT-R Nismo GT3	3	(Japan) Juku Sunaga	3
(Japan) Endless Sports	Nissan GT-R Nismo GT3	3	(Japan) Tajima Tsuyoshi	5
(Japan) Kondō Racing	Nissan GT-R Nismo GT3	24	(Japan) Tomonobu Fujii	1–2, 4–6
(Japan) Kondō Racing	Nissan GT-R Nismo GT3	24	(Japan) Kazuki Hiramine	1–2, 4–6
(Japan) Kondō Racing	Nissan GT-R Nismo GT3	24	(Japan) Yuudai Uchida	1–2, 4–6
(Hong Kong) J-Fly Racing by Phoenix Racing Asia	Audi R8 LMS	81	(Chinese Taipei) Jeffrey Lee	All
(Hong Kong) J-Fly Racing by Phoenix Racing Asia	Audi R8 LMS	81	(Macau) André Couto	All
(Hong Kong) J-Fly Racing by Phoenix Racing Asia	Audi R8 LMS	81	(Japan) Shintaro Kawabata	1–5
(Hong Kong) J-Fly Racing by Phoenix Racing Asia	Audi R8 LMS	81	(Belgium) Alessio Picariello	3, 6
(Hong Kong) Phoenix Racing Asia	Audi R8 LMS	82	(Hong Kong) Alex Au	1–4
(Hong Kong) Phoenix Racing Asia	Audi R8 LMS	82	(Hong Kong) Shaun Thong	1–4
(Hong Kong) Phoenix Racing Asia	Audi R8 LMS	82	(Malaysia) Alex Yoong	1–4
(Hong Kong) Phoenix Racing Asia	Audi R8 LMS	82	(United Kingdom) Philip Ellis	3
(Hong Kong) Phoenix Racing Asia	Audi R8 LMS	83	(Singapore) Lim Keong Wee	All
(Hong Kong) Phoenix Racing Asia	Audi R8 LMS	83	(Malaysia) Melvin Moh	All
(Hong Kong) Phoenix Racing Asia	Audi R8 LMS	83	(Hong Kong) Marchy Lee	1–4
(Hong Kong) Phoenix Racing Asia	Audi R8 LMS	83	(Austria) Max Hofer	3
(Hong Kong) Phoenix Racing Asia	Audi R8 LMS	83	(Switzerland) Mathias Beche	5–6
(Japan) GTNET Motor Sports	Nissan GT-R Nismo GT3	99	(Japan) Teruhiko Hamano	All
(Japan) GTNET Motor Sports	Nissan GT-R Nismo GT3	99	(Japan) Kazuki Hoshino	All
(Japan) GTNET Motor Sports	Nissan GT-R Nismo GT3	99	(Japan) Kiyoto Fujinami	All
(Japan) GTNET Motor Sports	Nissan GT-R Nismo GT3	99	(Japan) Hironobu Yasuda	3
(Japan) GTNET Motor Sports	Nissan GT-R Nismo GT3	99	(China) Sun Zheng	3, 5
(Japan) R.n. Sports	Mercedes-AMG GT3	112	(Japan) Atsushi Sato	1, 4, 6
(Japan) R.n. Sports	Mercedes-AMG GT3	112	(Japan) Ryosei Yamashita	1, 4, 6
(Japan) R.n. Sports	Mercedes-AMG GT3	112	(Japan) Nobuo Kubo	1, 4, 6
(Japan) MAX Racing	Lexus RC F GT3	244	(Japan) Tetsuya Tanaka	1, 3–6
(Japan) MAX Racing	Lexus RC F GT3	244	(Japan) Kimiya Sato	1, 3–6
(Japan) MAX Racing	Lexus RC F GT3	244	(Japan) Takeshi Tsuchiya	1, 3–6
(Japan) MAX Racing	Lexus RC F GT3	244	(Japan) Go Max	1, 3–5
(Japan) MAX Racing	Lexus RC F GT3	244	(Japan) Toru Tanaka	6
(Japan) D'station Racing	Porsche 911 GT3-R	777	(Japan) Satoshi Hoshino	1–4
(Japan) D'station Racing	Porsche 911 GT3-R	777	(Japan) Seiji Ara	1–4
(Japan) D'station Racing	Porsche 911 GT3-R	777	(Japan) Tsubasa Kondo	1–4
(Japan) D'station Racing	Porsche 911 GT3-R	777	(Japan) Yuya Motoshima	3
(Japan) CARGUY Racing	Lamborghini Huracán GT3	999	(Japan) Kei Cozzolino	6
(Japan) CARGUY Racing	Lamborghini Huracán GT3	999	(Japan) Takeshi Kimura	6
(Japan) CARGUY Racing	Lamborghini Huracán GT3	999	(Malaysia) Afiq Yazid	6
ST–Z
(Japan) BEND	Porsche Cayman GT4 Clubsport MR	51	(Japan) Daisuke Ikeda	3, 5
(Japan) BEND	Porsche Cayman GT4 Clubsport MR	51	(Japan) Masamitsu Ishihara	3, 5
(Japan) BEND	Porsche Cayman GT4 Clubsport MR	51	(Japan) Yuya Sakamoto	3, 5
(Japan) BEND	Porsche Cayman GT4 Clubsport MR	51	(Japan) Shinya Hosokawa	3
(Japan) BEND	Porsche Cayman GT4 Clubsport MR	51	(Japan) Atsushi Yogō	3
(Japan) Monokore	Ginetta G55 GT4	550	(Japan) "Ryo"	6
(Japan) Monokore	Ginetta G55 GT4	550	(Japan) Hideki Hirota	6
(Japan) Monokore	Ginetta G55 GT4	550	(Japan) Hironobu Yasuda	6
ST–TCR
(Japan) Adenau	Volkswagen Golf GTI TCR	10	(France) Philippe Devesa	All
(Japan) Adenau	Volkswagen Golf GTI TCR	10	(Japan) Shogo Mitsuyama	All
(Japan) Adenau	Volkswagen Golf GTI TCR	10	(Japan) Mitsuhiro Endō	3, 5
(Japan) Adenau	Volkswagen Golf GTI TCR	10	(Japan) Shuichi Wakisaka	3
(Japan) Birth Racing Project	Audi RS 3 LMS TCR	19	(Japan) “Hirobon”	All
(Japan) Birth Racing Project	Audi RS 3 LMS TCR	19	(Japan) "Yossy"	All
(Japan) Birth Racing Project	Audi RS 3 LMS TCR	19	(Japan) Koichi Okumura	1–5
(Japan) Birth Racing Project	Audi RS 3 LMS TCR	19	(Japan) Takuro Shinohara	1–2, 6
(Japan) Birth Racing Project	Audi RS 3 LMS TCR	19	(Japan) Kei Akiyoshi	3
(Japan) Birth Racing Project	Audi RS 3 LMS TCR	19	(Japan) Komiya Masanobu	3
(Japan) Birth Racing Project	Audi RS 3 LMS TCR	19	(Japan) Daisuke Yamawaki	3, 5
(Japan) Birth Racing Project	Audi RS 3 LMS TCR	19	(Japan) Takeshi Matsumoto	4, 6
Audi driving experience Japan	Audi RS 3 LMS TCR	33	(Japan) Hideki Nakahara	5
Audi driving experience Japan	Audi RS 3 LMS TCR	33	(Japan) Hiroaki Oiwa	5
Audi driving experience Japan	Audi RS 3 LMS TCR	33	(Japan) Ryuichiro Tomita	5
Audi driving experience Japan	Audi RS 3 LMS TCR	33	(Japan) Masataka Yanagida	5
(Japan) Audi Team DreamDrive	Audi RS 3 LMS TCR	45	(Japan) Naoto Takeda	1–4, 6
(Japan) Audi Team DreamDrive	Audi RS 3 LMS TCR	45	(Japan) Takuya Shirasaka	1–4, 6
(Japan) Audi Team DreamDrive	Audi RS 3 LMS TCR	45	(Japan) Shozo Tagahara	All
(Japan) Audi Team DreamDrive	Audi RS 3 LMS TCR	45	(Japan) Yoshiyuki Okumura	3, 5
(Japan) Audi Team DreamDrive	Audi RS 3 LMS TCR	46	(Japan) Toshiro Tsukada	1
(Japan) Audi Team DreamDrive	Audi RS 3 LMS TCR	46	(Japan) Yoshikazu Sobu	1
(Japan) Audi Team DreamDrive	Audi RS 3 LMS TCR	46	(Japan) Atsushi Ishizaki	1
(Japan) Audi Team DreamDrive	Audi RS 3 LMS TCR	46	(Japan) Yuji Kiyotaki	1
(Japan) Audi Team DreamDrive Noah	Audi RS 3 LMS TCR	75	(Japan) Yuji Kiyotaki	3–6
(Japan) Audi Team DreamDrive Noah	Audi RS 3 LMS TCR	75	(Japan) Yoshikazu Sobu	3–6
(Japan) Audi Team DreamDrive Noah	Audi RS 3 LMS TCR	75	(Japan) Toshiro Tsukada	3–6
(Japan) Audi Team DreamDrive Noah	Audi RS 3 LMS TCR	75	(Japan) Tadashi Watanabe	3–5
(Japan) Audi Team DreamDrive Noah	Audi RS 3 LMS TCR	75	(Japan) Kazuyuki Matsumoto	3
(Japan) Audi Team DreamDrive Noah	Audi RS 3 LMS TCR	75	(Japan) Yukihiro Yamaji	3
(Japan) Audi Team Mars	Audi RS 3 LMS TCR	65	(Japan) Daisuke Imamura	3–6
(Japan) Audi Team Mars	Audi RS 3 LMS TCR	65	(Japan) Hironori Ishizawa	3–6
(Japan) Audi Team Mars	Audi RS 3 LMS TCR	65	(Japan) Masato Kato	3–6
(Japan) Audi Team Mars	Audi RS 3 LMS TCR	65	(Japan) Toshihiro Yoshida	3
(Japan) B-Max Engineering with Dome	Honda Civic Type-R TCR (FK2)	96	(Japan) “Takumi”	1–2, 4
(Japan) B-Max Engineering with Dome	Honda Civic Type-R TCR (FK2)	96	(Japan) Motoyoshi Yoshida	1–2, 4
(Japan) B-Max Engineering with Dome	Honda Civic Type-R TCR (FK2)	96	(Japan) Ryuji “Dragon” Kumita	1–2, 4
(Japan) B-Max Engineering with Dome	Honda Civic Type-R TCR (FK2)	96	(Japan) “Syuji”	1–2
(Japan) B-Max Engineering with Dome	Honda Civic Type-R TCR (FK2)	96	(Japan) Shinichi Takagi	4
(Japan) B-Max Engineering with Dome	Honda Civic Type R TCR (FK8)	96	(Japan) “Takumi”	6
(Japan) B-Max Engineering with Dome	Honda Civic Type R TCR (FK8)	96	(Japan) Motoyoshi Yoshida	6
(Japan) B-Max Engineering with Dome	Honda Civic Type R TCR (FK8)	96	(Japan) Shinichi Takagi	6
(Japan) Modulo Racing with Dome	Honda Civic Type R TCR (FK8)	97	(Japan) Tadao Uematsu	All
(Japan) Modulo Racing with Dome	Honda Civic Type R TCR (FK8)	97	(Japan) Shinji Nakano	All
(Japan) Modulo Racing with Dome	Honda Civic Type R TCR (FK8)	97	(Japan) Hiroki Otsu	All
(Japan) Modulo Racing with Dome	Honda Civic Type R TCR (FK8)	97	(Japan) Takashi Kobayashi	All
(Japan) Modulo Racing with Dome	Honda Civic Type R TCR (FK8)	97	(Japan) Keiko Ishikawa	3
(Japan) DOME RACING PROJECT	Honda Civic Type R TCR (FK8)	98	(Japan) Taiyou Iida	All
(Japan) DOME RACING PROJECT	Honda Civic Type R TCR (FK8)	98	(Japan) Hiroki Katoh	All
(Japan) DOME RACING PROJECT	Honda Civic Type R TCR (FK8)	98	(Japan) Hiroshi Hamaguchi	1–3
(Japan) DOME RACING PROJECT	Honda Civic Type R TCR (FK8)	98	(Japan) Kazuho Takahashi	3–4
(Japan) DOME RACING PROJECT	Honda Civic Type R TCR (FK8)	98	(Singapore) Richard Wee	3
(Japan) DOME RACING PROJECT	Honda Civic Type R TCR (FK8)	98	(Japan) Keiko Ishikawa	5
(Japan) DOME RACING PROJECT	Honda Civic Type R TCR (FK8)	98	(Japan) Ryuji “Dragon” Kumita	6
ST–1
(Japan) apr	Porsche 911 GT3 Cup	31	(Japan) Katsuhito “Jack” Ogawa	1–2
(Japan) apr	Porsche 911 GT3 Cup	31	(Japan) Masami Kageyama	1–2, 5–6
(Japan) apr	Porsche 911 GT3 Cup	31	(Japan) Ryuichiro Tomita	1–2, 6
(Japan) apr	Porsche 911 GT3 Cup	31	(Japan) "T. Stark"	5–6
(Japan) apr	Porsche 911 GT3 Cup	31	(Japan) Yuta Kamimura	5
(Japan) D'station Racing	Porsche 911 GT3 Cup	47	(Japan) Tatsuya Hoshino	1–4
(Japan) D'station Racing	Porsche 911 GT3 Cup	47	(Japan) Manabu Orido	1–4
(Japan) D'station Racing	Porsche 911 GT3 Cup	47	(Japan) Kenji Hama	1–4
(Japan) D'station Racing	Porsche 911 GT3 Cup	47	(Japan) Kenji Kobayashi	3
(Japan) D'station Racing	Porsche 911 GT3 Cup	47	(South Korea) Lee Jung-woo	3
ST–2
(Japan) Shinryo Racing Team	Mitsubishi Lancer Evolution X	6	(Japan) Tomohiro Tomimasu	All
(Japan) Shinryo Racing Team	Mitsubishi Lancer Evolution X	6	(Japan) Yasushi Kikuchi	All
(Japan) Shinryo Racing Team	Mitsubishi Lancer Evolution X	6	(Japan) Masazumi Ohashi	All
(Japan) Shinryo Racing Team	Mitsubishi Lancer Evolution X	6	(Japan) Yoshiki Fujii	3
(Japan) Shinryo Racing Team	Mitsubishi Lancer Evolution X	6	(Japan) Setsuo Furuyama	3
(Japan) Shinryo Racing Team	Mitsubishi Lancer Evolution X	6	(Japan) Masato Narisawa	3
(Japan) Shinryo Racing Team	Mitsubishi Lancer Evolution X	7	(Japan) Wataru Yamaki	All
(Japan) Shinryo Racing Team	Mitsubishi Lancer Evolution X	7	(Japan) Turbo Asahi	All
(Japan) Shinryo Racing Team	Mitsubishi Lancer Evolution X	7	(Japan) Zene Okazaki	1–4
(Japan) Shinryo Racing Team	Mitsubishi Lancer Evolution X	7	(Japan) Kizuku Hirota	1–4
(Japan) Shinryo Racing Team	Mitsubishi Lancer Evolution X	7	(Japan) Hirofumi Okumura	3
(Japan) Shinryo Racing Team	Mitsubishi Lancer Evolution X	7	(Japan) Atsushi Ishizaki	5
(Japan) Shinryo Racing Team	Mitsubishi Lancer Evolution X	7	(Japan) Masato Narazawa	5–6
(Japan) Team Nopro	Mazda Axela Sky-D	17	(Japan) Tatsuya Tanigawa	All
(Japan) Team Nopro	Mazda Axela Sky-D	17	(Japan) Tatsuya Nogami	All
(Japan) Team Nopro	Mazda Axela Sky-D	17	(Japan) Toshihiko Nogami	All
(Japan) Team Nopro	Mazda Axela Sky-D	17	(Japan) Yosunari Fujiwara	3, 5
(Japan) Team Nopro	Mazda Axela Sky-D	17	(Japan) Hiroki Yamada	3
(Japan) TOWAINTEC Racing	Subaru Impreza WRX STI	59	(Japan) Manabu Osawa	All
(Japan) TOWAINTEC Racing	Subaru Impreza WRX STI	59	(Japan) Hitoshi Goto	All
(Japan) TOWAINTEC Racing	Subaru Impreza WRX STI	59	(Japan) Takuto Iguchi	All
(Japan) TOWAINTEC Racing	Subaru Impreza WRX STI	59	(Japan) Mizuki Ishizaka	All
ST–3
(Japan) MP Racing	Nissan Fairlady Z (Z33)	9	(Japan) Joe Shindo	All
(Japan) MP Racing	Nissan Fairlady Z (Z33)	9	(Japan) Keiichi Inoue	All
(Japan) MP Racing	Nissan Fairlady Z (Z33)	9	(Japan) Yusaku Shibata	1–2, 5–6
(Japan) MP Racing	Nissan Fairlady Z (Z33)	9	(Japan) Takahisa Ōno	3
(Japan) MP Racing	Nissan Fairlady Z (Z33)	9	(Japan) Takumi Takada	3
(Japan) MP Racing	Nissan Fairlady Z (Z33)	9	(Japan) "Natsu"	3
(Japan) MP Racing	Nissan Fairlady Z (Z33)	9	(Japan) Masami Kageyama	4
(Japan) Okabe Jidosha Motorsport	Nissan Fairlady (Z34)	14	(Japan) Masaya Kohno	All
(Japan) Okabe Jidosha Motorsport	Nissan Fairlady (Z34)	14	(Japan) Tomoaki Ichimori	All
(Japan) Okabe Jidosha Motorsport	Nissan Fairlady (Z34)	14	(Japan) Manabu Ohara	All
(Japan) Okabe Jidosha Motorsport	Nissan Fairlady (Z34)	14	(Japan) Manabu Yamazaki	All
(Japan) Okabe Jidosha Motorsport	Nissan Fairlady (Z34)	14	(Japan) Toshiaki Koshimizu	3
(Japan) Okabe Jidosha Motorsport	Nissan Fairlady (Z34)	14	(Japan) Takahiko Shimazawa	3
(Japan) Okabe Jidosha Motorsport	Nissan Fairlady (Z34)	15	(Japan) Masaaki Nagashima	All
(Japan) Okabe Jidosha Motorsport	Nissan Fairlady (Z34)	15	(Japan) Kazuomi Komatsu	All
(Japan) Okabe Jidosha Motorsport	Nissan Fairlady (Z34)	15	(Japan) Makoto Fujiwara	1–5
(Japan) Okabe Jidosha Motorsport	Nissan Fairlady (Z34)	15	(Japan) Yasutaka Hinoi	1–5
(Japan) Okabe Jidosha Motorsport	Nissan Fairlady (Z34)	15	(Japan) Ataka Mitsunori	3
(Japan) Okabe Jidosha Motorsport	Nissan Fairlady (Z34)	15	(Japan) Yutaka Katsuyoshi	3
(Japan) Okabe Jidosha Motorsport	Nissan Fairlady (Z34)	15	(Japan) Kenichi Sugiyama	6
(Japan) Techno First Racing Team	Lexus RC350	34	(Japan) Masaki Kano	All
(Japan) Techno First Racing Team	Lexus RC350	34	(Japan) Satoshi Matsubara	All
(Japan) Techno First Racing Team	Lexus RC350	34	(Japan) Riki Okusa	All
(Japan) Techno First Racing Team	Lexus RC350	34	(Japan) Takafumi Ohsaki	3
(Japan) Techno First Racing Team	Lexus RC350	34	(Japan) Naoshi Osaka	3
(Japan) Tracy Sports	Lexus IS350	38	(Japan) Makoto Hotta	1–4
(Japan) Tracy Sports	Lexus IS350	38	(Japan) Ryohei Sakaguchi	1–4
(Japan) Tracy Sports	Lexus IS350	38	(Japan) Morio Nitta	1–4
(Japan) Tracy Sports	Lexus RC350	38	(Japan) Makoto Hotta	5–6
(Japan) Tracy Sports	Lexus RC350	38	(Japan) Ryohei Sakaguchi	5–6
(Japan) Tracy Sports	Lexus RC350	38	(Japan) Morio Nitta	5–6
(Japan) Tracy Sports	Lexus RC350	39	(Japan) Yuya Tezuka	All
(Japan) Tracy Sports	Lexus RC350	39	(Japan) Kazuya Shimogaki	All
(Japan) Tracy Sports	Lexus RC350	39	(Japan) Shuji Maejima	All
(Japan) Tracy Sports	Lexus RC350	39	(Japan) Sesshu Kondo	All
(Japan) Le Beausset Motorsports	Lexus RC350	62	(Japan) Koki Saga	All
(Japan) Le Beausset Motorsports	Lexus RC350	62	(Japan) Kenta Yamashita	All
(Japan) Le Beausset Motorsports	Lexus RC350	62	(Japan) Ritomo Miyata	All
(Japan) Le Beausset Motorsports	Lexus RC350	62	(Japan) Hiroaki Ishiura	3
(Japan) Le Beausset Motorsports	Lexus RC350	62	(Japan) Hirate Kohei	3
(Japan) Saitama Toyopet GreenBrave	Toyota Mark X GR Sport	68	(Japan) Naoki Hattori	All
(Japan) Saitama Toyopet GreenBrave	Toyota Mark X GR Sport	68	(Japan) Shigekazu Wakisaka	All
(Japan) Saitama Toyopet GreenBrave	Toyota Mark X GR Sport	68	(Japan) Takayuki Hiranuma	All
(Japan) Saitama Toyopet GreenBrave	Toyota Mark X GR Sport	68	(Japan) Taku Bamba	3
(Japan) Saitama Toyopet GreenBrave	Toyota Mark X GR Sport	68	(Japan) Suga Fuwami	3
ST–4
(Japan) Endless Sports	Toyota 86	13	(Japan) Ryo Ogawa	All
(Japan) Endless Sports	Toyota 86	13	(Japan) Tsubasa Takahashi	All
(Japan) Endless Sports	Toyota 86	13	(Japan) Masaya Hanazato	All
(Japan) Endless Sports	Toyota 86	13	(Japan) Ryosuke Kure	All
(Japan) Endless Sports	Toyota 86	13	(Japan) Yuki Nakayama	3
(Japan) Endless Sports	Toyota 86	13	(Japan) Shinichi Kobayashi	3
(Japan) Asano Racing Service	Toyota 86	18	(Japan) Takeo Asano	All
(Japan) Asano Racing Service	Toyota 86	18	(Japan) Masataka Inoue	All
(Japan) Asano Racing Service	Toyota 86	18	(Japan) Yoshiyuki Tsuruga	1–2
(Japan) Asano Racing Service	Toyota 86	18	(Japan) Masayuki Mori	1–2
(Japan) Asano Racing Service	Toyota 86	18	(Japan) Shiba Toshikazu	3–6
(Japan) Asano Racing Service	Toyota 86	18	(Japan) Kazunori Fumura	3–4
(Japan) Asano Racing Service	Toyota 86	18	(Japan) Genki Usakura	3
(Japan) Asano Racing Service	Toyota 86	18	(Japan) Takashi Tobetsutani	3
(Japan) Asano Racing Service	Toyota 86	18	(Japan) Susumu Nakamura	5
(Japan) Asano Racing Service	Toyota 86	18	(Japan) Daiki Fujiwara	6
(Japan) APROS Racing	Toyota GRMN Vitz Turbo	26	(Japan) Mitsuaki Matsuo	All
(Japan) APROS Racing	Toyota GRMN Vitz Turbo	26	(Japan) Kazunari Yoshioka	All
(Japan) APROS Racing	Toyota GRMN Vitz Turbo	26	(Japan) Takashi Azuma	All
(Japan) APROS Racing	Toyota GRMN Vitz Turbo	26	(Japan) Yuichi Yokoo	All
(Japan) APROS Racing	Toyota GRMN Vitz Turbo	26	(Japan) Koji Miura	3
(Japan) APROS Racing	Toyota GRMN Vitz Turbo	26	(Japan) Hideki Kimura	3
(Japan) Makiguchi Engineering	Toyota 86	27	(Japan) Isao Ihashi	All
(Japan) Makiguchi Engineering	Toyota 86	27	(Japan) Ryuju Fujita	1–4
(Japan) Makiguchi Engineering	Toyota 86	27	(Japan) Hideki Hirota	1–3
(Japan) Makiguchi Engineering	Toyota 86	27	(Japan) Yuki Baba	3, 5–6
(Japan) Makiguchi Engineering	Toyota 86	27	(Japan) Ryo Yamada	5–6
(Japan) T’s Concept	Toyota 86	28	(Japan) Tohjiro Azuma	All
(Japan) T’s Concept	Toyota 86	28	(Japan) “Daisuke”	All
(Japan) T’s Concept	Toyota 86	28	(Japan) Tetsuya Moriyama	1–4
(Japan) T’s Concept	Toyota 86	28	(Japan) Masayuki Ueda	1–2, 4–6
(Japan) T’s Concept	Toyota 86	28	(Japan) Takashi Kubo	3
(Japan) T’s Concept	Toyota 86	28	(Japan) Shunsuke Kono	3
(Japan) T’s Concept	Toyota 86	28	(Japan) Tatsuya Kataoka	3
(Japan) T’s Concept	Toyota 86	28	(Japan) "Kembow"	5
(Japan) T’s Concept	Toyota 86	29	(Japan) Masahiro Sasaki	All
(Japan) T’s Concept	Toyota 86	29	(Japan) Yasuhiro Ogura	All
(Japan) T’s Concept	Toyota 86	29	(Japan) “Kembow”	1–2
(Japan) T’s Concept	Toyota 86	29	(Japan) Kazuya Oshima	3
(Japan) T’s Concept	Toyota 86	29	(Japan) Koyama Mihime	3–4
(Japan) T’s Concept	Toyota 86	29	(Japan) Daisuke Toyoda	3–6
(Japan) T’s Concept	Toyota 86	29	(Japan) Iida Akira	3
(Japan) TEAM HERO'S	Honda S2000	41	(Japan) Kensuke Yamamoto	6
(Japan) TEAM HERO'S	Honda S2000	41	(Japan) Ryuki Fujita	6
(Japan) TEAM HERO'S	Honda S2000	41	(Japan) Masahiro Aso	6
(Japan) TC Corse	Mazda Roadster (NC)	54	(Japan) Teruaki Kato	1–2, 4–6
(Japan) TC Corse	Mazda Roadster (NC)	54	(Japan) Yuui Tsutsumi	1–2, 4–6
(Japan) TC Corse	Mazda Roadster (NC)	54	(Japan) Yuya Hiraki	1–2, 4–6
(Japan) TC Corse	Mazda Roadster (NC)	54	(Japan) Hiroshi Nakamura	1–2, 4–5
(Japan) Auto Factory	Toyota 86	55	(Japan) Jun Tashiro	1–3
(Japan) Auto Factory	Toyota 86	55	(Japan) Takashi Ito	1–3
(Japan) Auto Factory	Toyota 86	55	(Japan) Masayuki Tanaka	1–3
(Japan) Auto Factory	Toyota 86	55	(Japan) Takayuki Oi	3
(Japan) Auto Factory	Toyota 86	55	(Japan) Yuichi Mikasa	3
(Japan) Auto Factory	Toyota 86	55	(Japan) Kenta Hanazawa	3
(Japan) Kobayashi Auto Racing Project	Honda Integra Type-R	58	(Japan) Koichi Kobayashi	All
(Japan) Kobayashi Auto Racing Project	Honda Integra Type-R	58	(Japan) Resshu Shioya	All
(Japan) Kobayashi Auto Racing Project	Honda Integra Type-R	58	(Japan) Hiroshi Ito	1–2, 5
(Japan) Kobayashi Auto Racing Project	Honda Integra Type-R	58	(Japan) Takao Seto	1–2, 6
(Japan) Kobayashi Auto Racing Project	Honda Integra Type-R	58	(Japan) Minoru Seino	3–4
(Japan) Kobayashi Auto Racing Project	Honda Integra Type-R	58	(Japan) Takayuki Yamada	3
(Japan) Kobayashi Auto Racing Project	Honda Integra Type-R	58	(Japan) Masayuki Sakano	3
(Japan) Cusco Racing	Toyota 86	77	(Japan) Eiji "Tarzan" Yamada	1–3, 5
(Japan) Cusco Racing	Toyota 86	77	(Japan) Koji Endo	1–3, 5
(Japan) Cusco Racing	Toyota 86	77	(Japan) Yasunori Nakajima	1–3, 5
(Japan) Cusco Racing	Toyota 86	77	(Japan) Yohei Hashimoto	3, 5
(Japan) Cusco Racing	Toyota 86	77	(Japan) Takeshi Matsui	3
(Japan) TOM'S Spirit	Toyota 86	86	(Japan) Takamitsu Matsui	All
(Japan) TOM'S Spirit	Toyota 86	86	(Japan) Yuichi Nakayama	All
(Japan) TOM'S Spirit	Toyota 86	86	(Japan) Sho Tsuboi	All
(Japan) TOM'S Spirit	Toyota 86	86	(Japan) Naoya Gamou	3
(Spain) Tracy Sports with SPV Racing	Toyota 86	100	(Japan) Hitoshi Matsui	2–3
(Spain) Tracy Sports with SPV Racing	Toyota 86	100	(Japan) Tetsuya Hibino	2–3
(Spain) Tracy Sports with SPV Racing	Toyota 86	100	(Japan) Yuya Hira	3
(Spain) Tracy Sports with SPV Racing	Toyota 86	100	(Japan) Ryohei Tanaka	3
(Spain) Tracy Sports with SPV Racing	Toyota 86	100	(Malaysia) Kenny Lee	3
(Spain) Tracy Sports with SPV Racing	Toyota 86	100	(Japan) Shinichi Hyodo	4, 6
(Spain) Tracy Sports with SPV Racing	Toyota 86	100	(Japan) Masafumi Inada	4, 6
(Japan) TEAM221 with W.S. Engineering	Honda S2000	116	(Japan) Yasuhiro Ogushi	4
(Japan) TEAM221 with W.S. Engineering	Honda S2000	116	(Japan) Tetsuya Shuto	4, 6
(Japan) TEAM221 with W.S. Engineering	Honda S2000	116	(Japan) Yoshida Yasuyuki	4, 6
(Japan) TEAM221 with W.S. Engineering	Honda S2000	116	(Japan) Ryuichiro Otsuka	6
(Japan) Hayashi Telempu SHADE Racing	Honda Integra Type-R	884	(Japan) Katsuyuki Hiranaka	1, 3–6
(Japan) Hayashi Telempu SHADE Racing	Honda Integra Type-R	884	(Japan) Hiro Hayashi	1, 3, 5–6
(Japan) Hayashi Telempu SHADE Racing	Honda Integra Type-R	884	(Japan) Shuji Takeuchi	1
(Japan) Hayashi Telempu SHADE Racing	Honda Integra Type-R	884	(Japan) Hiromasa Hayashi	1
(Japan) Hayashi Telempu SHADE Racing	Honda Integra Type-R	884	(Japan) Hiroki Yoshida	3–5
(Japan) Hayashi Telempu SHADE Racing	Honda Integra Type-R	884	(Japan) Yuji Kunimoto	3
(Japan) Le Mans 24h Project Team with CARGUY	Honda Civic Type-R Euro	999	(Japan) Shoki Tenkawa	3
(Japan) Le Mans 24h Project Team with CARGUY	Honda Civic Type-R Euro	999	(Japan) Yuki Shiraishi	3
(Japan) Le Mans 24h Project Team with CARGUY	Honda Civic Type-R Euro	999	(Japan) Hajime Noma	3
(Japan) Le Mans 24h Project Team with CARGUY	Honda Civic Type-R Euro	999	(Japan) Shimoyama Kazusu	3
ST–5
(Japan) Team221	Mazda Roadster (ND)	2	(Japan) Katsuhiko Tsutsui	All
(Japan) Team221	Mazda Roadster (ND)	2	(Japan) Junichiro Yamashita	All
(Japan) Team221	Mazda Roadster (ND)	2	(Japan) Ryuichiro Otsuka	1–2
(Japan) Team221	Mazda Roadster (ND)	2	(Japan) Yamaji Yama	3–6
(Japan) Team221	Mazda Roadster (ND)	2	(Japan) Masaki Tanaka	3–4
(Japan) Team221	Mazda Roadster (ND)	2	(Japan) Takahiro Tanaka	3
(Japan) Team221	Mazda Roadster (ND)	2	(Japan) Shuto Tetsuya	3
(Japan) Team221	Mazda Roadster (ND)	2	(Japan) Yuta Kamimura	6
(Japan) Team Bride	Honda Fit 3 RS	4	(Japan) Junzo Shibatani	1–2
(Japan) Team Bride	Honda Fit 3 RS	4	(Japan) Yuya Ota	All
(Japan) Team Bride	Honda Fit 3 RS	4	(Japan) Hidefumi Minami	All
(Japan) Team Bride	Honda Fit 3 RS	4	(Japan) Toshiya Ito	1–3
(Japan) Team Bride	Honda Fit 3 RS	4	(Japan) Kurosaki Kurosu	3
(Japan) Team Bride	Honda Fit 3 RS	4	(Japan) Seijiro Aihara	3
(Japan) Team Bride	Honda Fit 3 RS	4	(Japan) Carlos Honda	3–4, 6
(Japan) apr	Mazda Roadster (ND)	32	(Japan) Akihiro Harashima	1–2
(Japan) apr	Mazda Roadster (ND)	32	(Japan) Junko Takahashi	1–2
(Japan) apr	Mazda Roadster (ND)	32	(Japan) Akihiro Matsuda	1–2
(Japan) apr	Mazda Roadster (ND)	32	(Japan) Naoya Kawashima	1–2
(Japan) apr with Murakami Motors	Mazda Roadster (ND)	32	(Japan) Teru Nakamura	6
(Japan) apr with Murakami Motors	Mazda Roadster (ND)	32	(Japan) Haruhiko Sugino	6
(Japan) apr with Murakami Motors	Mazda Roadster (ND)	32	(Japan) Yoshimitsu Kondo	6
(Japan) Team Nopro	Mazda Demio Sky-D	37	(Japan) Yutaka Seki	All
(Japan) Team Nopro	Mazda Demio Sky-D	37	(Japan) Kaoru Ijiri	All
(Japan) Team Nopro	Mazda Demio Sky-D	37	(Japan) Tobio Ohtani	All
(Japan) Team Nopro	Mazda Demio Sky-D	37	(Japan) Yoshiaki Kato	3
(Japan) Dijon Racing	Honda Fit 3 RS	48	(Japan) Kyosuke Inomata	All
(Japan) Dijon Racing	Honda Fit 3 RS	48	(Japan) Hiroshi Takamori	All
(Japan) Dijon Racing	Honda Fit 3 RS	48	(Japan) Shunsuke Sato	1–2
(Japan) Dijon Racing	Honda Fit 3 RS	48	(Japan) Takahisa Ohno	1–2, 4–6
(Japan) Dijon Racing	Honda Fit 3 RS	48	(Japan) Sho Kawamura	3
(Japan) Dijon Racing	Honda Fit 3 RS	48	(Japan) Tetsuya Sasao	3
(Japan) Dijon Racing	Honda Fit 3 RS	48	(Japan) Seiyuki Neno	3
(Japan) Love Drive Racing with NATS	Mazda Roadster (ND)	50	(Japan) Marie Iwaoka	All
(Japan) Love Drive Racing with NATS	Mazda Roadster (ND)	50	(Japan) Anna Inotsume	All
(Japan) Love Drive Racing with NATS	Mazda Roadster (ND)	50	(Japan) Hiroko Komatsu	1–5
(Japan) Love Drive Racing with NATS	Mazda Roadster (ND)	50	(Japan) Yumiko Sekizaki	1–3
(Japan) Love Drive Racing with NATS	Mazda Roadster (ND)	50	(Japan) Kato Sayaka	3, 6
(Japan) Love Drive Racing with NATS	Mazda Roadster (ND)	50	(Japan) Tsujita Megumi	3
(Japan) Over Drive	Mazda Demio 15MB	66	(Japan) Riku Hashimoto	All
(Japan) Over Drive	Mazda Demio 15MB	66	(Japan) Takayuki Takechi	All
(Japan) Over Drive	Mazda Demio 15MB	66	(Japan) Shigetomo Shimono	1–3
(Japan) Over Drive	Mazda Demio 15MB	66	(Japan) Takashi Nishiyama	3
(Japan) Over Drive	Mazda Demio 15MB	66	(Japan) Yasushi Ide	3
(Japan) Over Drive	Mazda Demio 15MB	66	(Japan) Ryoku Tanioka	3
(Japan) Over Drive	Mazda Demio 15MB	66	(Japan) Makoto Furano	4–6
(Japan) Team Yamato	Honda Fit 3 RS	67	(Japan) Ayumu Ikeda	2
(Japan) Team Yamato	Honda Fit 3 RS	67	(Japan) Ryohei Yasui	2, 6
(Japan) Team Yamato	Honda Fit 3 RS	67	(Japan) Ryo Nakagawa	6
(Japan) J’s Racing	Honda Fit 3 RS	69	(Japan) Junichi Umemoto	All
(Japan) J’s Racing	Honda Fit 3 RS	69	(Malaysia) Ifwat Razak	All
(Japan) J’s Racing	Honda Fit 3 RS	69	(Japan) Masaharu Imuta	1–3
(Japan) J’s Racing	Honda Fit 3 RS	69	(Japan) Tomomitsu Senoo	1–3
(Japan) J’s Racing	Honda Fit 3 RS	69	(Japan) Hideo Kubota	3–5
(Japan) J’s Racing	Honda Fit 3 RS	69	(Japan) Hirokazu Takahashi	3
(Japan) J’s Racing	Honda Fit 3 RS	69	(Japan) Masuda Ranmuta	5
(Japan) J’s Racing	Honda Fit 3 RS	69	(Japan) Seiji Imuta	6
(Japan) J’s Racing	Honda Fit 3 RS	70	(Japan) Hideo Kubota	6
(Japan) J’s Racing	Honda Fit 3 RS	70	(China) Liu Yonglin	6
(Japan) J’s Racing	Honda Fit 3 RS	70	(China) Lv Yangyi	6
(Japan) Murakami Motors	Mazda Roadster (ND)	88	(Japan) Hiroyuki Murakami	3–6
(Japan) Murakami Motors	Mazda Roadster (ND)	88	(Japan) Keiji Amemiya	3–6
(Japan) Murakami Motors	Mazda Roadster (ND)	88	(Japan) Koichiro Yoshida	3–6
(Japan) Murakami Motors	Mazda Roadster (ND)	88	(Japan) Kununori Nakane	3–6
(Japan) Murakami Motors	Mazda Roadster (ND)	88	(Japan) Takeshi Wakiya	3
(Japan) Murakami Motors	Mazda Roadster (ND)	88	(Japan) Haruhiko Sugino	3
(Japan) FCA Racing	Honda Fit 3 RS	168	(Japan) Jun Fujii	All
(Japan) FCA Racing	Honda Fit 3 RS	168	(Japan) Toshihiro Kubota	All
(Japan) FCA Racing	Honda Fit 3 RS	168	(Japan) Shinsuke Umeda	All
(Japan) FCA Racing	Honda Fit 3 RS	168	(Japan) Yuji Ito	3

== Calendar and results ==
The 2018 schedule was announced in January 2018.

Rnd.	Class	Circuit	Date	Pole Position	Fastest Lap	Winners
1	ST–X	Suzuka Circuit, Suzuka City	31 March–1 April	(Japan) #24 Kondō Racing	(Japan) #24 Kondō Racing	(Japan) #99 GTNET Motor Sports
1	ST–X	Suzuka Circuit, Suzuka City	31 March–1 April	(Japan) Tomonobu Fujii (Japan) Yudai Uchida (Japan) Kazuki Hiramine	(Japan) Tomonobu Fujii (Japan) Yudai Uchida (Japan) Kazuki Hiramine	(Japan) Teruhiko Hamano (Japan) Kazuki Hoshino (Japan) Kiyoto Fujinami
1	ST–TCR	Suzuka Circuit, Suzuka City	31 March–1 April	(Japan) #19 Birth Racing Project	(Japan) #45 Audi Team DreamDrive	(Japan) #97 Modulo Racing with Dome
1	ST–TCR	Suzuka Circuit, Suzuka City	31 March–1 April	(Japan) "Hirobon" (Japan) "Yossy" (Japan) Takuro Shinohara (Japan) Koichi Okumura	(Japan) Naoto Takeda (Japan) Takuya Shirasaka (Japan) Shozo Tagahara	(Japan) Tadao Uematsu (Japan) Shinji Nakano (Japan) Hiroki Otsu (Japan) Takashi Kobayashi
1	ST–1	Suzuka Circuit, Suzuka City	31 March–1 April	(Japan) #31 apr	(Japan) #31 apr	(Japan) #47 D’station Racing
1	ST–1	Suzuka Circuit, Suzuka City	31 March–1 April	(Japan) Masami Kageyama (Japan) Katsuhito “Jack” Ogawa (Japan) Ryuichiro Tomita	(Japan) Masami Kageyama (Japan) Katsuhito “Jack” Ogawa (Japan) Ryuichiro Tomita	(Japan) Tatsuya Hoshino (Japan) Manabu Orido (Japan) Kenji Hama
1	ST–2	Suzuka Circuit, Suzuka City	31 March–1 April	(Japan) #59 TOWAINTEC Racing	(Japan) #6 Shinryo Racing Team	(Japan) #59 TOWAINTEC Racing
1	ST–2	Suzuka Circuit, Suzuka City	31 March–1 April	(Japan) Manabu Osawa (Japan) Hitoshi Gotoh (Japan) Takuto Iguchi (Japan) Mizuki Ishizawa	(Japan) Tomohiro Tomimasu (Japan) Yasushi Kikuchi (Japan) Masazumi Ohashi	(Japan) Manabu Osawa (Japan) Hitoshi Gotoh (Japan) Takuto Iguchi (Japan) Mizuki Ishizawa
1	ST–3	Suzuka Circuit, Suzuka City	31 March–1 April	(Japan) #38 Tracy Sports	(Japan) #38 Tracy Sports	(Japan) #38 Tracy Sports
1	ST–3	Suzuka Circuit, Suzuka City	31 March–1 April	(Japan) Makoto Hotta (Japan) Ryohei Sakaguchi	(Japan) Makoto Hotta (Japan) Ryohei Sakaguchi	(Japan) Makoto Hotta (Japan) Ryohei Sakaguchi
1	ST–4	Suzuka Circuit, Suzuka City	31 March–1 April	(Japan) #86 TOM'S Spirit	(Japan) #55 Auto Factory	(Japan) #86 TOM'S Spirit
1	ST–4	Suzuka Circuit, Suzuka City	31 March–1 April	(Japan) Takamitsu Matsui (Japan) Yuichi Nakayama (Japan) Sho Tsuboi	(Japan) Jun Tashiro (Japan) Takashi Ito (Japan) Masayuki Tanaka	(Japan) Takamitsu Matsui (Japan) Yuichi Nakayama (Japan) Sho Tsuboi
1	ST–5	Suzuka Circuit, Suzuka City	31 March–1 April	(Japan) #4 Team Bride	(Japan) #2 Team221	(Japan) #2 Team221
1	ST–5	Suzuka Circuit, Suzuka City	31 March–1 April	(Japan) Junzo Shibatani (Japan) Yuya Ota (Japan) Toshiya Ito (Japan) Hidefumi Minami	(Japan) Katsuhiko Tsutsui (Japan) Ryuichiro Otsuka (Japan) Junichiro Yamashita	(Japan) Katsuhiko Tsutsui (Japan) Ryuichiro Otsuka (Japan) Junichiro Yamashita
2	ST–X	Sportsland SUGO, Murata	28–29 April	(Japan) #777 D'station Racing	(Japan) #777 D'station Racing	(Japan) #777 D'station Racing
2	ST–X	Sportsland SUGO, Murata	28–29 April	(Japan) Satoshi Hoshino (Japan) Seiji Ara (Japan) Tsubasa Kondo	(Japan) Satoshi Hoshino (Japan) Seiji Ara (Japan) Tsubasa Kondo	(Japan) Satoshi Hoshino (Japan) Seiji Ara (Japan) Tsubasa Kondo
2	ST–TCR	Sportsland SUGO, Murata	28–29 April	(Japan) #98 DOME RACING PROJECT	(Japan) #19 Birth Racing Project	(Japan) #97 Modulo Racing with Dome
2	ST–TCR	Sportsland SUGO, Murata	28–29 April	(Japan) Taiyou Iida (Japan) Hiroki Katoh (Japan) Hiroshi Hamaguchi	(Japan) "Hirobon" (Japan) "Yossy" (Japan) Takuro Shinohara (Japan) Koichi Okumura	(Japan) Tadao Uematsu (Japan) Shinji Nakano (Japan) Hiroki Otsu (Japan) Takashi Kobayashi
2	ST–1	Sportsland SUGO, Murata	28–29 April	(Japan) #47 D’station Racing	(Japan) #31 apr	(Japan) #31 apr
2	ST–1	Sportsland SUGO, Murata	28–29 April	(Japan) Tatsuya Hoshino (Japan) Manabu Orido (Japan) Kenji Hama	(Japan) Masami Kageyama (Japan) Katsuhito “Jack” Ogawa (Japan) Ryuichiro Tomita	(Japan) Masami Kageyama (Japan) Katsuhito “Jack” Ogawa (Japan) Ryuichiro Tomita
2	ST–2	Sportsland SUGO, Murata	28–29 April	(Japan) #6 Shinryo Racing Team	(Japan) #59 TOWAINTEC Racing	(Japan) #59 TOWAINTEC Racing
2	ST–2	Sportsland SUGO, Murata	28–29 April	(Japan) Tomohiro Tomimasu (Japan) Yasushi Kikuchi (Japan) Masazumi Ohashi	(Japan) Manabu Osawa (Japan) Hitoshi Gotoh (Japan) Takuto Iguchi (Japan) Mizuki Ishizawa	(Japan) Manabu Osawa (Japan) Hitoshi Gotoh (Japan) Takuto Iguchi (Japan) Mizuki Ishizawa
2	ST–3	Sportsland SUGO, Murata	28–29 April	(Japan) #68 Saitama Toyopet GreenBrave	(Japan) #38 Tracy Sports	(Japan) #15 Okabe Jidosha Motorsport
2	ST–3	Sportsland SUGO, Murata	28–29 April	(Japan) Naoki Hattori (Japan) Shigekazu Wakisaka (Japan) Takayuki Hiranuma	(Japan) Makoto Hotta (Japan) Ryohei Sakaguchi (Japan) Morio Nitta	(Japan) Masaaki Nagashima (Japan) Kazuomi Komatsu (Japan) Makoto Fujiwara (Japan) Yasutaka Hinoi
2	ST–4	Sportsland SUGO, Murata	28–29 April	(Japan) #86 TOM'S Spirit	(Japan) #86 TOM'S Spirit	(Japan) #86 TOM'S Spirit
2	ST–4	Sportsland SUGO, Murata	28–29 April	(Japan) Takamitsu Matsui (Japan) Yuichi Nakayama (Japan) Sho Tsuboi	(Japan) Takamitsu Matsui (Japan) Yuichi Nakayama (Japan) Sho Tsuboi	(Japan) Takamitsu Matsui (Japan) Yuichi Nakayama (Japan) Sho Tsuboi
2	ST–5	Sportsland SUGO, Murata	28–29 April	(Japan) #66 Over Drive	(Japan) #168 FCA Racing	(Japan) #67 Team Yamato
2	ST–5	Sportsland SUGO, Murata	28–29 April	(Japan) Riku Hashimoto (Japan) Shigetomo Shimono (Japan) Takayuki Takechi	(Japan) Jun Fujii (Japan) Toshihiro Kubota (Japan) Shinsuke Umeda	(Japan) Ayumu Ikeda (Japan) Ryohei Yasui
3	ST–X	Fuji Speedway, Oyama	31 May–3 June	(Japan) #3 Endless Sports	(Hong Kong) #83 Phoenix Racing Asia	(Japan) #99 GTNET Motor Sports
3	ST–X	Fuji Speedway, Oyama	31 May–3 June	(Japan) Yukinori Taniguchi (Japan) Hideki Yamauchi (Japan) Tsubasa Mekaru	(Singapore) Lim Keong Wee (Hong Kong) Marchy Lee (Malaysia) Melvin Moh	(Japan) Teruhiko Hamano (Japan) Kazuki Hoshino (Japan) Kiyoto Fujinami
3	ST–TCR	Fuji Speedway, Oyama	31 May–3 June	(Japan) #65 Audi Team Mars	(Japan) #65 Audi Team Mars	(Japan) #75 Audi Team DreamDrive Noah
3	ST–TCR	Fuji Speedway, Oyama	31 May–3 June	(Japan) Daisuke Imamura (Japan) Masato Kato (Japan) Hiroki Ishizawa	(Japan) Daisuke Imamura (Japan) Masato Kato (Japan) Hiroki Ishizawa	(Japan) Toshiro Tsukada (Japan) Yoshikazu Sobu (Japan) Atsushi Ishizaki (Japan) Yuji Kiyotaki
3	ST–1	Fuji Speedway, Oyama	31 May–3 June	(Japan) #47 D’station Racing	(Japan) #47 D’station Racing	(Japan) #47 D’station Racing
3	ST–1	Fuji Speedway, Oyama	31 May–3 June	(Japan) Tatsuya Hoshino (Japan) Manabu Orido (Japan) Kenji Hama	(Japan) Tatsuya Hoshino (Japan) Manabu Orido (Japan) Kenji Hama	(Japan) Tatsuya Hoshino (Japan) Manabu Orido (Japan) Kenji Hama
3	ST–2	Fuji Speedway, Oyama	31 May–3 June	(Japan) #59 TOWAINTEC Racing	(Japan) #59 TOWAINTEC Racing	(Japan) #6 Shinryo Racing Team
3	ST–2	Fuji Speedway, Oyama	31 May–3 June	(Japan) Manabu Osawa (Japan) Hitoshi Gotoh (Japan) Takuto Iguchi (Japan) Mizuki Ishizawa	(Japan) Manabu Osawa (Japan) Hitoshi Gotoh (Japan) Takuto Iguchi (Japan) Mizuki Ishizawa	(Japan) Tomohiro Tomimasu (Japan) Yasushi Kikuchi (Japan) Masazumi Ohashi
3	ST–3	Fuji Speedway, Oyama	31 May–3 June	(Japan) #68 Saitama Toyopet GreenBrave	(Japan) #15 Okabe Jidosha Motorsport	(Japan) #68 Saitama Toyopet GreenBrave
3	ST–3	Fuji Speedway, Oyama	31 May–3 June	(Japan) Naoki Hattori (Japan) Shigekazu Wakisaka (Japan) Takayuki Hiranuma	(Japan) Masaaki Nagashima (Japan) Kazuomi Komatsu (Japan) Makoto Fujiwara (Japan) Yasutaka Hinoi	(Japan) Naoki Hattori (Japan) Shigekazu Wakisaka (Japan) Takayuki Hiranuma
3	ST–4	Fuji Speedway, Oyama	31 May–3 June	(Japan) #86 TOM'S Spirit	(Japan) #29 T’s Concept	(Japan) #55 Auto Factory
3	ST–4	Fuji Speedway, Oyama	31 May–3 June	(Japan) Takamitsu Matsui (Japan) Yuichi Nakayama (Japan) Sho Tsuboi	(Japan) Masahiro Sasaki (Japan) Yasuhiro Ogura (Japan) “Kembow”	(Japan) Jun Tashiro (Japan) Takashi Ito (Japan) Masayuki Tanaka
3	ST–5	Fuji Speedway, Oyama	31 May–3 June	(Japan) #66 Over Drive	(Japan) #168 FCA Racing	(Japan) #88 Murakami Motors
3	ST–5	Fuji Speedway, Oyama	31 May–3 June	(Japan) Riku Hashimoto (Japan) Shigetomo Shimono (Japan) Takayuki Takechi	(Japan) Jun Fujii (Japan) Toshihiro Kubota (Japan) Shinsuke Umeda	(Japan) Hiroyuki Murakami (Japan) Takeshi Wakitani (Japan) Kununori Nakane (Japan) Masato Kato
4	ST–X	Autopolis, Kamitsue	14–15 July	(Japan) #24 Kondō Racing	(Hong Kong) #81 J-Fly Racing by Phoenix Racing Asia	(Japan) #24 Kondō Racing
4	ST–X	Autopolis, Kamitsue	14–15 July	(Japan) Tomonobu Fujii (Japan) Yudai Uchida (Japan) Kazuki Hiramine	(Taiwan) Jeffrey Lee (Macau) André Couto (Belgium) Alessio Picariello	(Japan) Tomonobu Fujii (Japan) Yudai Uchida (Japan) Kazuki Hiramine
4	ST–TCR	Autopolis, Kamitsue	14–15 July	(Japan) #98 DOME RACING PROJECT	(Japan) #45 Audi Team DreamDrive	(Japan) #98 DOME RACING PROJECT
4	ST–TCR	Autopolis, Kamitsue	14–15 July	(Japan) Taiyou Iida (Japan) Hiroki Katoh (Japan) Hiroshi Hamaguchi	(Japan) Naoto Takeda (Japan) Takuya Shirasaka (Japan) Shozo Tagahara	(Japan) Taiyou Iida (Japan) Hiroki Katoh (Japan) Hiroshi Hamaguchi
4	ST–1	Autopolis, Kamitsue	14–15 July	(Japan) #47 D’station Racing	(Japan) #47 D’station Racing	(Japan) #47 D’station Racing
4	ST–1	Autopolis, Kamitsue	14–15 July	(Japan) Tatsuya Hoshino (Japan) Manabu Orido (Japan) Kenji Hama	(Japan) Tatsuya Hoshino (Japan) Manabu Orido (Japan) Kenji Hama	(Japan) Tatsuya Hoshino (Japan) Manabu Orido (Japan) Kenji Hama
4	ST–2	Autopolis, Kamitsue	14–15 July	(Japan) #6 Shinryo Racing Team	(Japan) #59 TOWAINTEC Racing	(Japan) #59 TOWAINTEC Racing
4	ST–2	Autopolis, Kamitsue	14–15 July	(Japan) Tomohiro Tomimasu (Japan) Yasushi Kikuchi (Japan) Masazumi Ohashi	(Japan) Manabu Osawa (Japan) Hitoshi Gotoh (Japan) Takuto Iguchi (Japan) Mizuki Ishizawa	(Japan) Manabu Osawa (Japan) Hitoshi Gotoh (Japan) Takuto Iguchi (Japan) Mizuki Ishizawa
4	ST–3	Autopolis, Kamitsue	14–15 July	(Japan) #14 Okabe Jidosha Motorsport	(Japan) #15 Okabe Jidosha Motorsport	(Japan) #39 Tracy Sports
4	ST–3	Autopolis, Kamitsue	14–15 July	(Japan) Masaya Kohno (Japan) Tomoaki Ichimori (Japan) Manabu Ohara (Japan) Manabu Yamazaki	(Japan) Masaaki Nagashima (Japan) Kazuomi Komatsu (Japan) Makoto Fujiwara (Japan) Yasutaka Hinoi	(Japan) Yuya Tezuka (Japan) Kazuya Shimogaki (Japan) Shuji Maejima (Japan) Sesshu Kondo
4	ST–4	Autopolis, Kamitsue	14–15 July	(Japan) #86 TOM'S Spirit	(Japan) #86 TOM'S Spirit	(Japan) #86 TOM'S Spirit
4	ST–4	Autopolis, Kamitsue	14–15 July	(Japan) Takamitsu Matsui (Japan) Yuichi Nakayama (Japan) Sho Tsuboi	(Japan) Takamitsu Matsui (Japan) Yuichi Nakayama (Japan) Sho Tsuboi	(Japan) Takamitsu Matsui (Japan) Yuichi Nakayama (Japan) Sho Tsuboi
4	ST–5	Autopolis, Kamitsue	14–15 July	(Japan) #2 Team221	(Japan) #2 Team221	(Japan) #2 Team221
4	ST–5	Autopolis, Kamitsue	14–15 July	(Japan) Katsuhiko Tsutsui (Japan) Ryuichiro Otsuka (Japan) Junichiro Yamashita	(Japan) Katsuhiko Tsutsui (Japan) Ryuichiro Otsuka (Japan) Junichiro Yamashita	(Japan) Katsuhiko Tsutsui (Japan) Ryuichiro Otsuka (Japan) Junichiro Yamashita
5	ST–X	Twin Ring Motegi, Motegi	22–23 September	(Japan) #24 Kondō Racing	(Hong Kong) #83 Phoenix Racing Asia	(Japan) #3 Endless Sports
5	ST–X	Twin Ring Motegi, Motegi	22–23 September	(Japan) Tomonobu Fujii (Japan) Yudai Uchida (Japan) Kazuki Hiramine	(Singapore) Lim Keong Wee (Hong Kong) Marchy Lee (Malaysia) Melvin Moh	(Japan) Yukinori Taniguchi (Japan) Hideki Yamauchi (Japan) Tsubasa Mekaru
5	ST–TCR	Twin Ring Motegi, Motegi	22–23 September	(Japan) #65 Audi Team Mars	(Japan) #10 Adenau	(Japan) #98 DOME RACING PROJECT
5	ST–TCR	Twin Ring Motegi, Motegi	22–23 September	(Japan) Daisuke Imamura (Japan) Masato Kato (Japan) Hiroki Ishizawa	(France) Philippe Devesa (Japan) Shogo Mitsuyama	(Japan) Taiyou Iida (Japan) Hiroki Katoh (Japan) Hiroshi Hamaguchi
5	ST–1	Twin Ring Motegi, Motegi	22–23 September	(Japan) #31 apr	(Japan) #31 apr	(Japan) #31 apr
5	ST–1	Twin Ring Motegi, Motegi	22–23 September	(Japan) Masami Kageyama (Japan) Katsuhito “Jack” Ogawa (Japan) Ryuichiro Tomita	(Japan) Masami Kageyama (Japan) Katsuhito “Jack” Ogawa (Japan) Ryuichiro Tomita	(Japan) Masami Kageyama (Japan) Katsuhito “Jack” Ogawa (Japan) Ryuichiro Tomita
5	ST–2	Twin Ring Motegi, Motegi	22–23 September	(Japan) #6 Shinryo Racing Team	(Japan) #6 Shinryo Racing Team	(Japan) #59 TOWAINTEC Racing
5	ST–2	Twin Ring Motegi, Motegi	22–23 September	(Japan) Tomohiro Tomimasu (Japan) Yasushi Kikuchi (Japan) Masazumi Ohashi	(Japan) Tomohiro Tomimasu (Japan) Yasushi Kikuchi (Japan) Masazumi Ohashi	(Japan) Manabu Osawa (Japan) Hitoshi Gotoh (Japan) Takuto Iguchi (Japan) Mizuki Ishizawa
5	ST–3	Twin Ring Motegi, Motegi	22–23 September	(Japan) #62 Le Beausset Motorsports	(Japan) #38 Tracy Sports	(Japan) #62 Le Beausset Motorsports
5	ST–3	Twin Ring Motegi, Motegi	22–23 September	(Japan) Koki Saga (Japan) Kenta Yamashita (Japan) Ritomo Miyata	(Japan) Makoto Hotta (Japan) Ryohei Sakaguchi (Japan) Morio Nitta	(Japan) Koki Saga (Japan) Kenta Yamashita (Japan) Ritomo Miyata
5	ST–4	Twin Ring Motegi, Motegi	22–23 September	(Japan) #58 Kobayashi Auto Racing Project	(Japan) #58 Kobayashi Auto Racing Project	(Japan) #86 TOM'S Spirit
5	ST–4	Twin Ring Motegi, Motegi	22–23 September	(Japan) Koichi Kobayashi (Japan) Resshu Shioya (Japan) Hiroshi Ito (Japan) Takao Seto	(Japan) Koichi Kobayashi (Japan) Resshu Shioya (Japan) Hiroshi Ito (Japan) Takao Seto	(Japan) Takamitsu Matsui (Japan) Yuichi Nakayama (Japan) Sho Tsuboi
5	ST–5	Twin Ring Motegi, Motegi	22–23 September	(Japan) #4 Team Bride	(Japan) #4 Team Bride	(Japan) #4 Team Bride
5	ST–5	Twin Ring Motegi, Motegi	22–23 September	(Japan) Junzo Shibatani (Japan) Yuya Ota (Japan) Toshiya Ito (Japan) Hidefumi Minami	(Japan) Junzo Shibatani (Japan) Yuya Ota (Japan) Toshiya Ito (Japan) Hidefumi Minami	(Japan) Junzo Shibatani (Japan) Yuya Ota (Japan) Toshiya Ito (Japan) Hidefumi Minami
6	ST–X	Okayama International Circuit, Mimasaka	3–4 November	(Hong Kong) #83 Phoenix Racing Asia	(Hong Kong) #81 J-Fly Racing by Phoenix Racing Asia	(Japan) #24 Kondō Racing
6	ST–X	Okayama International Circuit, Mimasaka	3–4 November	(Singapore) Lim Keong Wee (Hong Kong) Marchy Lee (Malaysia) Melvin Moh	(Taiwan) Jeffrey Lee (Macau) André Couto (Belgium) Alessio Picariello	(Japan) Tomonobu Fujii (Japan) Yudai Uchida (Japan) Kazuki Hiramine
6	ST–TCR	Okayama International Circuit, Mimasaka	3–4 November	(Japan) #45 Audi Team DreamDrive	(Japan) #96 B-Max Engineering with Dome	(Japan) #97 Modulo Racing with Dome
6	ST–TCR	Okayama International Circuit, Mimasaka	3–4 November	(Japan) Naoto Takeda (Japan) Takuya Shirasaka (Japan) Shozo Tagahara	(Japan) “Takumi” (Japan) Motoyoshi Yoshida (Japan) “Syuji” (Japan) Ryuji “Dragon” Kumita	(Japan) Tadao Uematsu (Japan) Shinji Nakano (Japan) Hiroki Otsu (Japan) Takashi Kobayashi
6	ST–1	Okayama International Circuit, Mimasaka	3–4 November	(Japan) #31 apr	(Japan) #31 apr	(Japan) #31 apr
6	ST–1	Okayama International Circuit, Mimasaka	3–4 November	(Japan) Masami Kageyama (Japan) Katsuhito “Jack” Ogawa (Japan) Ryuichiro Tomita	(Japan) Masami Kageyama (Japan) Katsuhito “Jack” Ogawa (Japan) Ryuichiro Tomita	(Japan) Masami Kageyama (Japan) Katsuhito “Jack” Ogawa (Japan) Ryuichiro Tomita
6	ST–2	Okayama International Circuit, Mimasaka	3–4 November	(Japan) #6 Shinryo Racing Team	(Japan) #59 TOWAINTEC Racing	(Japan) #6 Shinryo Racing Team
6	ST–2	Okayama International Circuit, Mimasaka	3–4 November	(Japan) Tomohiro Tomimasu (Japan) Yasushi Kikuchi (Japan) Masazumi Ohashi	(Japan) Manabu Osawa (Japan) Hitoshi Gotoh (Japan) Takuto Iguchi (Japan) Mizuki Ishizawa	(Japan) Tomohiro Tomimasu (Japan) Yasushi Kikuchi (Japan) Masazumi Ohashi
6	ST–3	Okayama International Circuit, Mimasaka	3–4 November	(Japan) #68 Saitama Toyopet GreenBrave	(Japan) #15 Okabe Jidosha Motorsport	(Japan) #38 Tracy Sports
6	ST–3	Okayama International Circuit, Mimasaka	3–4 November	(Japan) Naoki Hattori (Japan) Shigekazu Wakisaka (Japan) Takayuki Hiranuma	(Japan) Masaaki Nagashima (Japan) Kazuomi Komatsu (Japan) Makoto Fujiwara (Japan) Yasutaka Hinoi	(Japan) Makoto Hotta (Japan) Ryohei Sakaguchi (Japan) Morio Nitta
6	ST–4	Okayama International Circuit, Mimasaka	3–4 November	(Japan) #86 TOM'S Spirit	(Japan) #58 Kobayashi Auto Racing Project	(Japan) #13 Endless Sports
6	ST–4	Okayama International Circuit, Mimasaka	3–4 November	(Japan) Takamitsu Matsui (Japan) Yuichi Nakayama (Japan) Sho Tsuboi	(Japan) Koichi Kobayashi (Japan) Resshu Shioya (Japan) Hiroshi Ito (Japan) Takao Seto	(Japan) Ryo Ogawa (Japan) Tsubasa Takahashi (Japan) Masaya Hanazato (Japan) Ryosuke Kure
6	ST–5	Okayama International Circuit, Mimasaka	3–4 November		(Japan) #168 FCA Racing	(Japan) #2 Team221
6	ST–5	Okayama International Circuit, Mimasaka	3–4 November		(Japan) Jun Fujii (Japan) Toshihiro Kubota (Japan) Shinsuke Umeda	(Japan) Katsuhiko Tsutsui (Japan) Ryuichiro Otsuka (Japan) Junichiro Yamashita

== Championship standings ==
Pos.	Driver	SUZ	SUG	FUJ	AUT	MOT	OKA	Pts.
ST–X
1	(Japan) No. 99 GTNET Motor Sports	1	5	1	2	3	2	144.5
2	(Japan) No. 24 Kondo Racing	**2**	3		**1**	**6**	1	101.5
3	(Japan) No. 3 Endless Sports	9	4	**5**	5	1	5	88
4	(Hong Kong) No. 83 Phoenix Racing Asia	DSQ	DSQ	2	6	2	3	83.5
5	(Hong Kong) No. 81 J-Fly Racing by Phoenix Racing Asia	DSQ	DSQ	3	4	4	4	71
6	(Japan) No. 244 MAX Racing	7	6	4		5	7	56
7	(Japan) No. 777 D'station Racing	3	**1**	Ret	8			46.5
8	(Japan) No. 112 R.n. Sports	6			7		8	21
9	(Hong Kong) No. 82 Phoenix Racing Asia	DSQ	DSQ	Ret	3			19
10	(Japan) No. 999 CARGUY Racing						6	7
ST–Z
1	(Japan) No. 51 BEND			**1**		**1**		79
2	(Japan) No. 550 Monokore						**1**	22
ST–TCR
1	(Japan) No. 97 Modulo Racing with Dome	1	1	2	2	2	1	156
2	(Japan) No. 98 DOME RACING PROJECT	4	**5**	5	**1**	1	5	117
3	(Japan) No. 19 Birth Racing Project	**Ret**	2	3	5	3	3	90
4	(Japan) No. 45 Audi Team DreamDrive	3	4	4	Ret	5	**2**	84
5	(Japan) No. 75 Audi Team DreamDrive Noah	Ret	6	1	6	6	6	80
6	(Japan) No. 65 Audi Team Mars		3	**6**	4	**4**	4	72
7	(Japan) No. 10 Adenau	2	Ret	Ret	3	Ret	7	47.5
8	No. 33 Audi driving experience Japan					7		7
9	(Japan) No. 96 B-Max Engineering with Dome	Ret	Ret		Ret		8	4
ST–1
1	(Japan) No. 47 D'station Racing	1	**2**	**1**	**1**	**1**	**1**	127
2	(Japan) No. 31 apr	**Ret**	1					76
ST–2
1	(Japan) No. 59 TOWAINTEC Racing	**1**	**1**	**4**	1	1	2	156
2	(Japan) No. 6 Shinryo Racing Team	2	3	1	**3**	**3**	**1**	145.5
3	(Japan) No. 7 Shinryo Racing Team	3	Ret	3	4	2	3	99.5
4	(Japan) No. 17 Team Nopro	4	2	2	2	Ret	Ret	91.5
ST–3
1	(Japan) No. 38 Tracy Sports	**1**	2	3	6	2	1	130.5
2	(Japan) No. 62 Le Beausset Motorsports	3	3	2	4	**1**	3	129
3	(Japan) No. 68 Saitama Toyotpet GreenBrave	5	**5**	**1**	3	3	**4**	120
4	(Japan) No. 15 Okabe Jidosha Motorsport	2	1	7	5	7	2	90.5
5	(Japan) No. 39 Tracy Sports	4	6	4	1	8	6	90.5
6	(Japan) No. 34 Techno First Racing Team	6	7	8	2	4	5	71.5
7	(Japan) No. 14 Okabe Jidosha Motorsport	7	4	5	**7**	6	7	60
8	(Japan) No. 9 MP Racing	8	8	6	8	5	8	46
ST–4
1	(Japan) No. 86 TOM's Spirit	**1**	**1**	**4**	**1**	1	**2**	159
2	(Japan) No. 884 Hayashi Telempu SHADE Racing	5	2	2	2	3	4	102.5
3	(Japan) No. 13 Endless Sports	2	3	Ret	6	2	1	91
4	(Japan) No. 55 Auto Factory	**4**	2	1				78
5	(Japan) No. 29 T's Concept	11	10	3	5	5	12	58
6	(Japan) No. 18 Asano Racing Service	8	5	6	7	6	5	54.5
7	(Japan) No. 58 Kobayashi Auto Racing Project	6	4	Ret	8	**Ret**	3	40.5
8	(Japan) No. 54 TC Corse	3	7		Ret	4	Ret	40
9	(Japan) No. 28 T's Concept	7	6	11	4	8	10	33
10	(Japan) No. 27 Makiguchi Engineering	Ret	8	7	3	Ret	Ret	33
11	(Japan) No. 77 Cusco Racing	9	9	5	Ret			26
12	(Japan) No. 26 APROS Racing	10	11	9	Ret	7	8	20.5
13	(Spain) No. 100 Tracy Sports with SPV Racing		Ret	10			6	11
14	(Japan) No. 116 TEAM221 with W.S. Engineering				9		7	9
15	(Japan) No. 999 Le Mans 24h Project Team with CARGUY			8				8
16	(Japan) No. 220 Yutsuki Yukari Racing						9	3
17	(Japan) No. 41 TEAM HERO'S						11	1
ST–5
1	(Japan) No. 2 Team221	1	2	5	**1**	5	1	132
2	(Japan) No. 88 Murakami Motors	3	4	1	2	4	2	131.5
3	(Japan) No. 37 Team Nopro	4	Ret	2	9	2	3	92.5
4	(Japan) No. 48 Dijon Racing	2	5	6	5	3	9	81.5
5	(Japan) No. 4 Team Bride	**Ret**	3	4	7	**1**	14	77
6	(Japan) No. 69 J's Racing	5	10	3	3	8	6	74.5
7	(Japan) No. 66 Over Drive	Ret	**7**	**7**	4	6	5	52
8	(Japan) No. 168 FCA Racing	8	6	9	6	9	10	35.5
9	(Japan) No. 50 Love Drive Racing with NATS	6	Ret	8	8	7	7	35.5
10	(Japan) No. 67 Team Yamato		1				Ret	21
11	(Japan) No. 32 apr	7	8				8	15
12	(Japan) No. 11 Blood Sports						**4**	13
13	(Japan) No. 78 Love Drive Racing with NATS		9				12	4
14	(Japan) No. 70 J's Racing						11	1
15	(Japan) No. 103 Blood Sports						13	1
Pos.	Driver	SUZ	SUG	FUJ	AUT	MOT	OKA	Pts.

Colour	Result
Gold	Winner
Silver	Second place
Bronze	Third place
Green	Points classification
Blue	Non-points classification
Blue	Non-classified finish (NC)
Purple	Retired, not classified (Ret)
Red	Did not qualify (DNQ)
Red	Did not pre-qualify (DNPQ)
Black	Disqualified (DSQ)
White	Did not start (DNS)
White	Withdrew (WD)
White	Race cancelled (C)
Blank	Did not practice (DNP)
Blank	Did not arrive (DNA)
Blank	Excluded (EX)

**Bold** – Pole
Italics – Fastest Lap

Notes:

- † – Drivers did not finish the race, but were classified as they completed over 75% of the race distance.
