= Ryuichiro Tomita =

Japanese racing driver (born 1988)

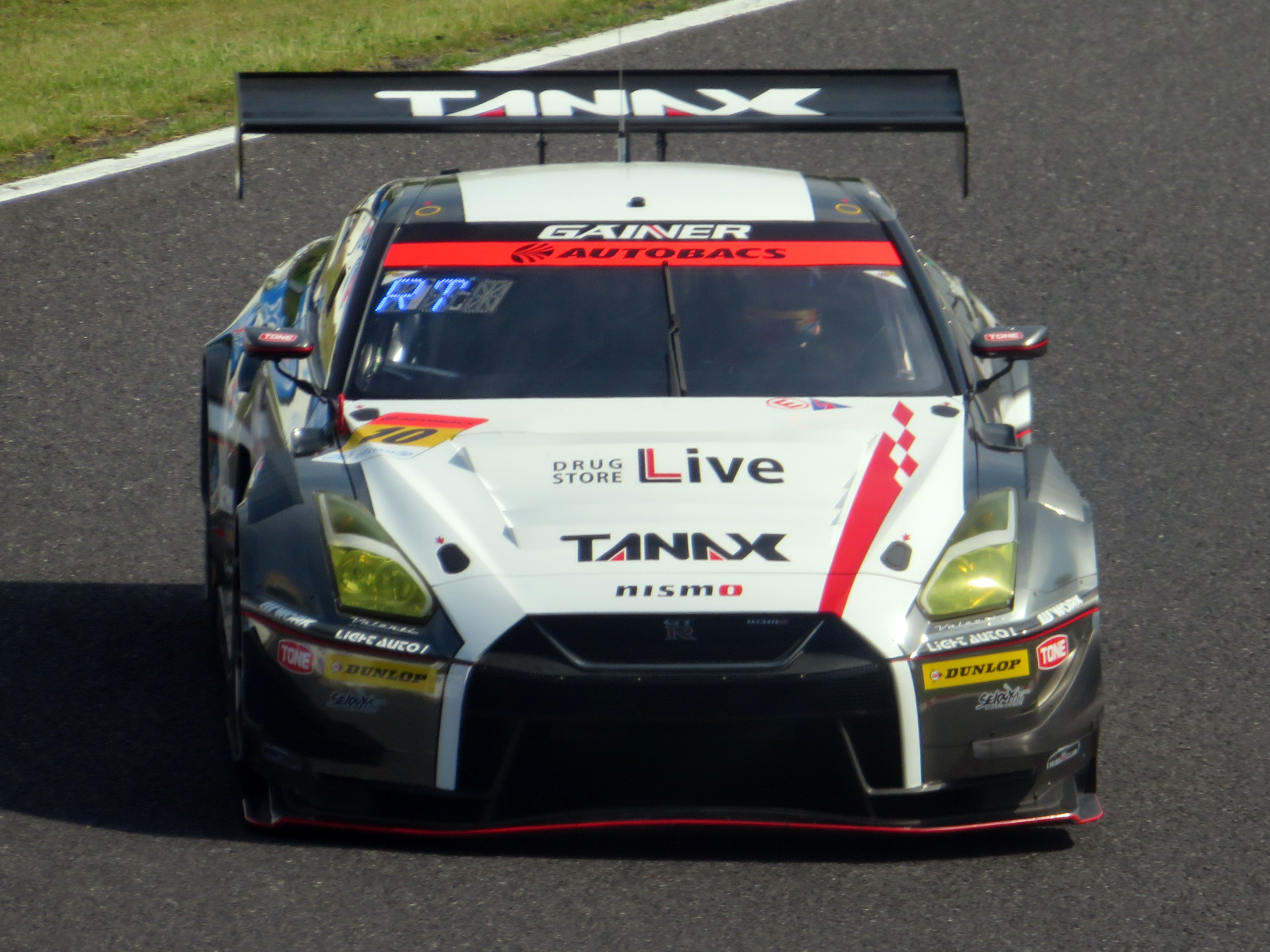
- Tomita at the third round of the 2022 Super GT Series at Suzuka
- Nationality: (Japan) Japanese
- Born: 28 October 1988 (age 38) Tokyo, Japan
- Categorisation: FIA Silver (until 2021); FIA Gold (2022–)

Championship titles
- 2017 2013, 2014: Super Taikyu - ST-1; GT-R Prestige Cup

Ryuichiro Tomita (富田 竜一郎, Tomita Ryūichirō; born 28 October 1988 in Tokyo) is a Japanese racing driver set to compete for GAINER in Super GT and Team ZeroOne in Super Taikyu.

== Career ==
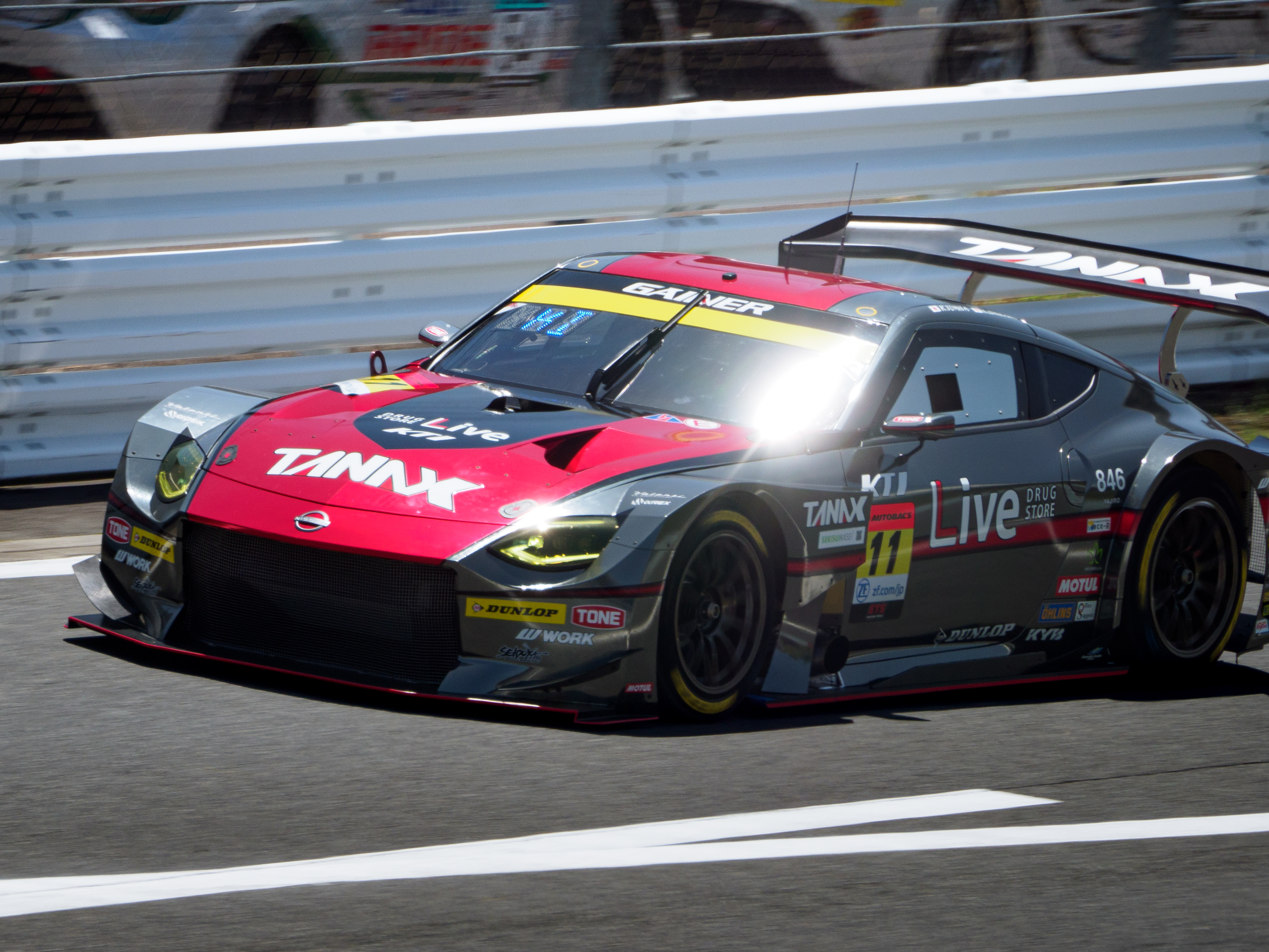
Tomita's GAINER Nissan Z at the second round of the 2024 Super GT Series at Fuji.

Tomita made his car racing debut in 2013, racing in the GT-R Prestige Cup, which he won in his rookie season. Returning to the series for the following year, Tomita won the title again, as he made one-off appearances for Dijon Racing in the Super FJ Fuji and Suzuka series, as well as select starts in the GT300 class of Super GT. Joining GAINER as the team's third driver for the 2015 Super GT season, Tomita raced three times, finishing second on debut at Buriram and winning at Suzuka to end the year eighth in points.

Remaining with GAINER for his first full season of Super GT competition in 2016, Tomita scored a lone podium at Suzuka en route to an eighth-place points finish. Staying with the team for a third consecutive season, Tomita took a best result of fifth at Suzuka to end the year a lowly 18th in points. During 2017, Tomita also raced for apr in the ST-1 class of Super Taikyu, winning all but one race he started to help the team secure the class title at season's end.

Switching to Audi Sport Team Hitotsuyama for the 2018 season, Tomita scored his only points of the season by finishing tenth at Fuji en route to a 22nd-place points finish. Tomita also raced for the same team at the Suzuka 10 Hours, finishing eighth overall. During 2018, Tomita also raced part-time in Super Taikyu, competing in select rounds for apr in ST-1, as well as making a one-off appearance in ST-TCR for Audi Driving Experience Japan Remaining with Hitotsuyama for 2019, Tomita scored points three times, with a best result of seventh at Sportsland SUGO to end the year 24th in points. Tomita also raced with the team at the Suzuka 10 Hours as well as making a one-off appearance in the FIA World Touring Car Cup at Suzuka.

Moving to Europe for 2020, Tomita joined Belgian Audi Club Team WRT to race in the GT World Challenge Europe Sprint Cup alongside Kelvin van der Linde. In his maiden season in the series, Tomita finished second on debut at Misano and won race one at Zandvoort en route to a fourth-place points finish in the overall standings. Tomita remained with Belgian Audi Club Team WRT for the following year, racing in the Silver cup of the GT World Challenge Europe Endurance and Sprint Cups. In the former, Tomita scored a class podium at Barcelona to finish 11th in points, whereas in the latter, Tomita took class wins at Misano and Brands Hatch to secure runner-up honors.

Remaining in Europe for 2022, Tomita raced for Team WRT in he GT World Challenge Europe Endurance Cup, as well as racing in all but one rounds of Super GT for GAINER in GT300. Racing in the Gold Cup in the former, Tomita scored three class podiums with a best overall result of 18th at Le Castellet en route to a fourth-place points finish in class. In Super GT, Tomita won at Fuji and scored further podiums at Suzuka and Sportsland SUGO as he ended the season sixth in points. During 2022, Tomita also raced in the ST-3 class of Super Taikyu for Team ZeroOne. The following year, Tomita continued with GAINER to race in Super GT, as well as racing in the ST-Z class of Super Taikyu for Team ZeroOne. In the former, Tomita won at Fuji to end the year 12th in the standings, whereas in the latter, Tomita scored three class podiums to help the team finish the season fourth in the ST-Z points.

In 2024, Tomita remained with GAINER as the team switched to the Fairlady Z, scoring a best result of seventh at Autopolis, after starting 25th, to end the year 17th in points. During 2024, Tomita also raced in the ST-Z class of Super Taikyu for Team ZeroOne, scoring three podiums en route to a fifth-place points finish. Staying with GAINER for the following year, Tomita scored points four times, taking a best result of fifth at Sportsland SUGO to round of the year 21st in the GT300 standings. In 2025, Tomita also raced with Team ZeroOne in Super Taikyu's ST-Z class, winning at Motegi and Okayama to help the team secure runner-up honors at season's end.

The following year, Tomita continued to race for GAINER and Team ZeroOne to race in the GT300 and ST-Z classes of Super GT and Super Taikyu respectively. In Super GT, Tomita qualified on pole and took his only podium of the season at Motegi to finish 14th in GT300 standings.

== Racing record ==
=== Racing career summary ===
Season	Series	Team	Races	Wins	Poles	F/Laps	Podiums	Points	Position
2013	GT-R Prestige Cup								**1st**
2014	Super FJ – Fuji Series	Dijon Racing	1	0	0	0	1		
2014	Super FJ – Suzuka Series	Dijon Racing	1	0	0	0	0		
2014	Super GT - GT300	Dijon Racing	2	0	0	0	1	0	NC
2014	GT-R Prestige Cup								**1st**
2015	Super GT - GT300	GAINER	3	1	0	0	2	45	8th
2016	Super GT - GT300	GAINER	8	0	0	0	1	38	8th
2017	Super GT - GT300	GAINER	8	0	0	0	0	13	18th
2017	Super Taikyu - ST-1	apr	6	5	6	6	6	137‡	**1st‡**
2018	Super GT - GT300	Audi Sport Team Hitotsuyama	8	0	0	0	0	1	22nd
2018	Intercontinental GT Challenge	Audi Sport Team Hitotsuyama	1	0	0	0	0	4	23rd
2018	Super Taikyu - ST-1	apr	3	2	2	3	3	76‡	**2nd‡**
2018	Super Taikyu - ST-TCR	Audi Driving Experience Japan	1	0	0	0	0	7‡	8th‡
2019	Super GT - GT300	Audi Sport Team Hitotsuyama	8	0	0	0	0	10	24th
2019	Intercontinental GT Challenge	Audi Sport Team Hitotsuyama	1	0	0	0	0	0	NC
2019	FIA World Touring Car Cup	Audi Sport Team Hitotsuyama	3	0	0	0	0	0	NC†
2019	Super Taikyu - ST-X	MP Racing	2	0	0	0	2	101‡	**3rd‡**
2019	Super Taikyu - ST-TCR	Audi Driving Experience Japan	1	0	0	0	1	19‡	10th‡
2020	GT World Challenge Europe Sprint Cup	Belgian Audi Club Team WRT	11	1	0	1	2	66	4th
2020	Super GT - GT300	NILZZ Racing	1	0	0	0	0	0	NC
2020	Super Taikyu - ST-X	MP Racing	1	0	0	0	1	87.5‡	**2nd‡**
2020	Super Taikyu - ST-Z	Endless Racing	1	1	0	0	1	129.5‡	**1st‡**
2020	Super Taikyu - ST-TCR	Audi Driving Experience Japan	1	0	0	0	1	18‡	5th‡
2021	GT World Challenge Europe Endurance Cup	Belgian Audi Club Team WRT	5	0	0	0	0	4	28th
2021	GT World Challenge Europe Endurance Cup – Silver	Belgian Audi Club Team WRT	5	0	0	0	1	51	11th
2021	GT World Challenge Europe Sprint Cup	Belgian Audi Club Team WRT	10	0	0	0	1	33.5	8th
2021	GT World Challenge Europe Sprint Cup – Silver	Belgian Audi Club Team WRT	10	2	0	0	5	85.5	**2nd**
2021	Intercontinental GT Challenge	Team WRT	1	0	0	0	0	0	NC
2021	Super GT - GT300	NILZZ Racing	2	0	0	0	0	0	NC
2021	Super Taikyu - ST-X	MP Racing	1	0	0	0	0	41‡	6th‡
2022	Super GT - GT300	GAINER	7	1	1	0	3	45	6th
2022	GT World Challenge Europe Endurance Cup	Team WRT	5	0	0	0	0	0	NC
2022	GT World Challenge Europe Endurance Cup – Gold	Team WRT	5	0	0	0	3	61	4th
2022	Super Taikyu - ST-3	Team ZeroOne	4	0	0	0	2	49‡	5th‡
2023	Super GT - GT300	GAINER	8	1	0	1	1	28	12th
2023	Super Taikyu - ST-Z	Team ZeroOne	6	0	1	1	3	77.5‡	4th‡
2024	Super GT - GT300	GAINER	7	0	0	0	0	8	17th
2024	Super Taikyu - ST-Z	Team ZeroOne	7	0	4	2	3	75‡	5th‡
2025	Super GT - GT300	GAINER	8	0	0	0	0	26	21st
2025	Super Taikyu - ST-Z	Team ZeroOne	7	2	1	0	4	96‡	**2nd‡**
2026	Super GT - GT300	GAINER	8	0	1	2	1	46	14th
2026	Super Taikyu - ST-Z	Team ZeroOne						‡	‡

† As Tomita was a guest driver, he was ineligible to score points.

‡ Team standings

=== Complete Super GT results ===
(key) (Races in bold indicate pole position) (Races in italics indicate fastest lap)

Year	Team	Car	Class	1	2	3	4	5	6	7	8	9	DC	Points
2014	Dijon Racing	Nissan GT-R GT3	GT300	OKA	FUJ	AUT	SUG	FUJ	SUZ; 14	BUR; 19	MOT		NC	0
2015	GAINER	Nissan GTR	GT300	OKA	FUJ; 1	CHA; 2	FUJ	SUZ; 1	SUG; 6	AUT	MOT		8th	45
2016	GAINER	Nissan GT-R GT3	GT300	OKA; 8	FUJ; 5	SUG; 11	FUJ; 9	SUZ; 3	CHA; 4	MOT; 5	MOT; 15		8th	38
2017	GAINER	Nissan GT-R NISMO GT3	GT300	OKA; 6	FUJ; 24	AUT; 15	SUG; 21	FUJ; 16	SUZ; 5	BUR; 18	MOT; 19		18th	13
2018	Audi Team Hitotsuyama	Audi R8 LMS	GT300	OKA; Ret	FUJ; 10	SUZ; 23	CHA; Ret	FUJ; 14	SUG; 23	AUT; 14	MOT; 11		22nd	1
2019	Audi Team Hitotsuyama	Audi R8 LMS Evo	GT300	OKA; 13	FUJ; 8	SUZ; 8	CHA; 13	FUJ; 13	AUT; 13	SUG; 7	MOT; 27		24th	10
2020	NILZZ Racing	Nissan GT-R Nismo GT3	GT300	FUJ	FUJ	SUZ	MOT	FUJ	SUZ	MOT; 11	FUJ		NC	0
2021	NILZZ Racing	Nissan GT-R Nismo GT3	GT300	OKA; 12	FSW	SUZ	TRM; 27	SUG	AUT	TRM	FSW		NC	0
2022	GAINER	Nissan GT-R Nismo GT3	GT300	OKA; 6	FUJ; 1	SUZ; 15	FUJ; 22	**SUZ**; **2**	SUG; 3	AUT	MOT; 8		6th	45
2023	GAINER	Nissan GT-R Nismo GT3	GT300	OKA; Ret	FUJ1; 17	SUZ1; 5	FUJ2; 1	SUZ2; 15	SUG; 12	AUT; 9	MOT; 13		12th	28
2024	GAINER	Nissan Fairlady Z GT300 (RZ34)	GT300	OKA; WD	FUJ1; Ret	SUZ1; Ret	FUJ2; 10	SUG; Ret	AUT; 7	MOT; 23†	SUZ2; 8		17th	8
2025	GAINER	Nissan Fairlady Z GT300 (RZ34)	GT300	OKA; 11	FUJ; 14	SEP	FS1 (12)	FS2; 19	SUZ; 10	SUG; 5	AUT; DNS	MOT; 24	21st	26
2026	GAINER	Nissan Fairlady Z GT300 (RZ34)	GT300	OKA; 19	FUJ; 14	FUJ; 19	SUZ; 9	SUG; 6	AUT; 23	**MOT**; 6	MOT; 3		14th	46

^{‡} Half points awarded as less than 75% of race distance was completed.
^{(Number)} Driver did not take part in this sprint race, points are still awarded for the teammate's result.
^{*} Season still in progress.

=== Complete World Touring Car Cup results ===
(key) (Races in bold indicate pole position) (Races in italics indicate fastest lap)

Year	Team	Car	1	2	3	4	5	6	7	8	9	10	11	12	13	14	15	16	17	18	19	20	21	22	23	24	25	26	27	28	29	30	DC	Points
2019	Audi Sport Team Hitotsuyama	Audi RS 3 LMS TCR	MAR; 1	MAR; 2	MAR; 3	HUN; 1	HUN; 2	HUN; 3	SVK; 1	SVK; 2	SVK; 3	NED; 1	NED; 2	NED; 3	GER; 1	GER; 2	GER; 3	POR; 1	POR; 2	POR; 3	CHN; 1	CHN; 2	CHN; 3	JPN; 1; 19	JPN; 2; 17	JPN; 3; 23†	MAC; 1	MAC; 2	MAC; 3	MAL; 1	MAL; 2	MAL; 3	NC‡	0‡

^{‡} As Tomita was a Wildcard entry, he was ineligible to score points.

=== Complete GT World Challenge Europe results ===
==== GT World Challenge Europe Sprint Cup ====
(key) (Races in bold indicate pole position) (Races in italics indicate fastest lap)

Year	Team	Car	Class	1	2	3	4	5	6	7	8	9	10	Pos.	Points
2020	Belgian Audi Club Team WRT	Audi R8 LMS Evo	Pro	MIS; 1; 2	MIS; 2; 5	MIS; 3; 7	MAG; 1; 5	MAG; 2; 6	ZAN; 1; 1	ZAN; 2; 11	CAT; 1; 7	CAT; 2; 4	CAT; 3; 4	4th	66
2021	Belgian Audi Club Team WRT	Audi R8 LMS Evo	Silver	MAG; 1; 24	MAG; 2; 11	ZAN; 1; 4	ZAN; 2; 7	MIS; 1; 26	MIS; 2; 4	BRH; 1; 3	BRH; 2; 5	VAL; 1; 14	VAL; 2; 16	2nd	85.5

==== GT World Challenge Europe Endurance Cup ====
(key) (Races in bold indicate pole position) (Races in italics indicate fastest lap)

Year	Team	Car	Class	1	2	3	4	5	6	7	Pos.	Points
2021	Belgian Audi Club Team WRT	Audi R8 LMS Evo	Silver	MNZ; 8	LEC; Ret	SPA; 6H; 37	SPA; 12H; 16	SPA; 24H; 24	NÜR; 16	CAT; 12	11th	51
2022	Team WRT	Audi R8 LMS Evo II	Gold	IMO; Ret	LEC; 18	SPA; 6H; 49	SPA; 12H; 40	SPA; 24H; 24	HOC; 24	CAT; 27	4th	61
