= Gainer (racing team) =

Japanese racing team

Gainer Co, Ltd.
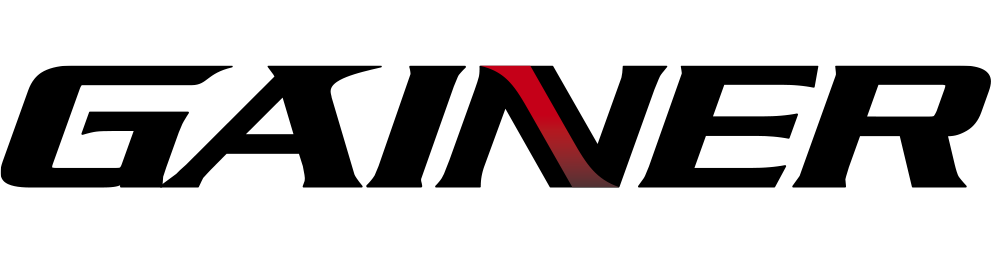
- Founded: 1999
- Base: Kyoto City, Kyoto
- Team principal(s): Kazumi Fujii
- Founder(s): Kenji Tanaka
- Current series: Super GT - GT300
- Current drivers: Car #11: (Japan) Ryuichiro Tomita; (Japan) Kazuki Oki; Car #26: (Japan) Hironobu Yasuda; (South Korea) Lee Jungwoo
- Teams' Championships: 2014, 2015 Super GT
- Drivers' Championships: 2015 Super GT
- Website: www.gainer.asia

Gainer Co, Ltd. is a Japanese racing team that competes in Super GT.

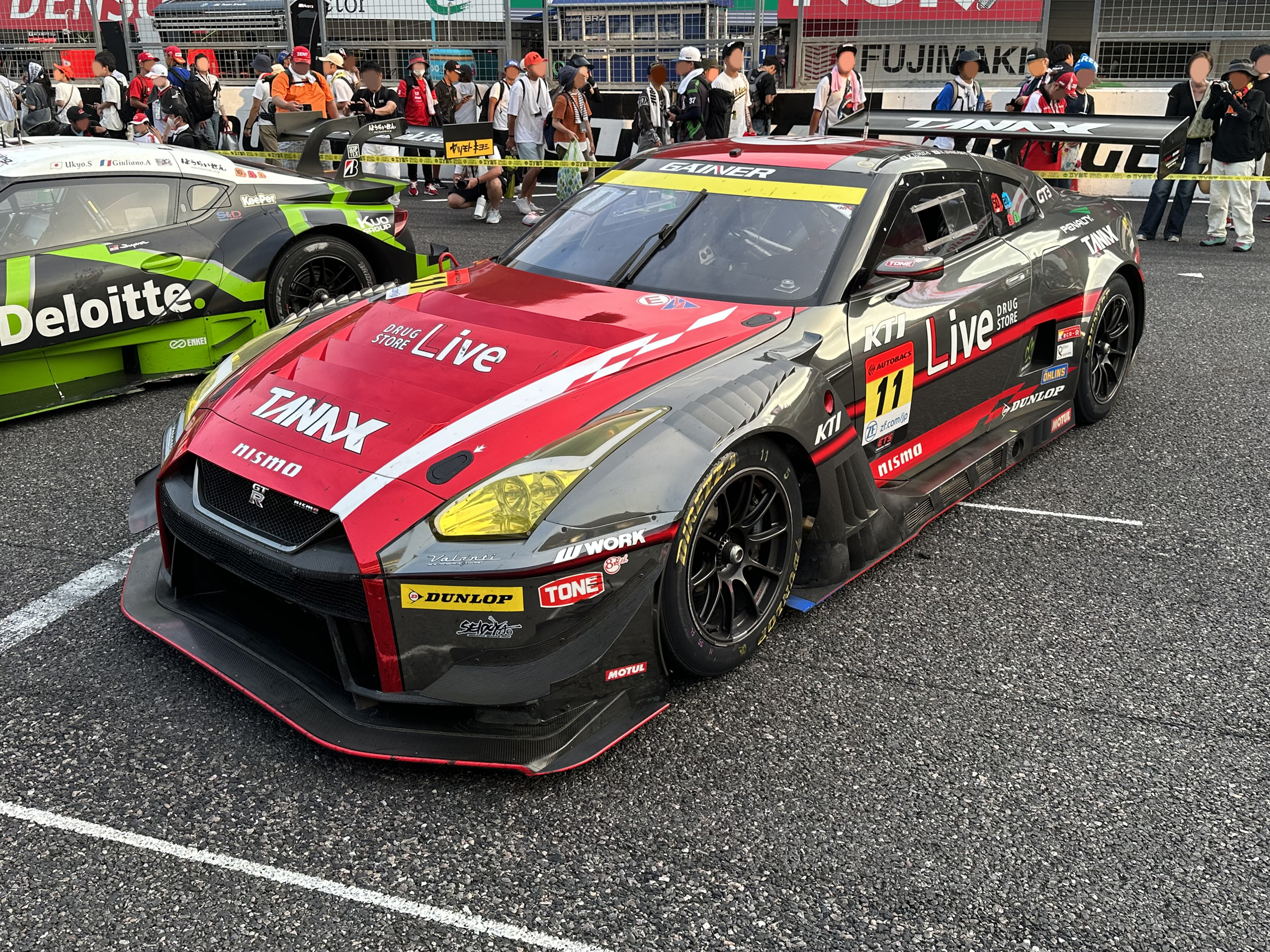
GAINER Nissan GT-R Nismo GT3 at Suzuka.

== History ==
GAINER was founded in 1999. They made their debut in the 2000 All Japan Grand Touring Car Championship with the Ferrari F355. For 2003, GAINER changed the team name to "Jim Gainer Racing" where they participated with the aim of becoming the series champion with a Ferrrari F360 engineered by Dome to be uniquely right-hand drive with a special bodywork. In 2007 the team changed to the Ferrari F430, which was completely designed and manufactured in-house by GAINER itself. In 2009, Tetsuya Tanaka and Katsuyuki Hiranaka raced with the team achieving a win at Autopolis along with two other podium finishes. In 2010 the team switched to Dunlop tires. The team won the JAF Grand Prix Fuji Sprint Cup.

In 2012 The team name was changed to GAINER and switched to the Audi R8 LMS ultra. They managed to finish 7th place in the standings, achieving another win, this time in the season opener at Okayama. GAINER switched cars once again, this time using the Mercedes-Benz SLS AMG GT3 for the 2013 season. The line up consisted of two cars. The number 11 driven by Katsuyuki Hiranaka and Bjorn Wirdheim, who had experience in GT500, while Number 10 was driven by Tetsuya Tanaka and Masayuki Ueda. In 2014 The No. 11 car of Hiranaka and Wirdheim, took pole position at the final round in Motegi and took the win, despite having the same amount of points as champions GOODSMILE Racing, it finished second in the drivers' title after losing a tie-breaker as they had less wins. However, they won the team's championship with by one point. In 2015, GAINER raced with 1 Mercedes-Benz SLS AMG GT3 retaining Hiranaka & Wirdheim, while also racing a Nissan GT-R Nismo GT3 with André Couto and Katsumasa Chiyo as the line up. The Nissan car had two wins, and won the long-awaited overall GT300 driver/team title. The champion driver was Couto, as Chiyo raced couple of rounds while Ryuichiro Tomita drove whenever Chiyo wasn't available. The Mercedes also put up a strong showing, finishing 5th overall with three podium finishes.

In 2018, GAINER became an official Nissan team, retiring the SLS, replacing it with another GTR. Car No. 11 was driven by Katsuyuki Hiranaka and Hironobu Yasuda, just like the previous year. Car No. 10 featured Kazuki Hoshino and Keishi Ishikawa. Car No. 11 finished 3rd in the ranking with 2 wins. Car No. 10 was 14th in the ranking with one win. In 2022, Car No. 11 was driven by Hironobu Yasuda and Ishikawa. While car No. 10 was driven by Tomita, Riki Okusa, and Yusuke Shiotsu. Car No. 11 ranked 5th, while car No. 10 came close at winning the GT300 title, finishing 2nd in the points. As a team, they achieved five podium finishes, including one win. Okusa clinched third place in driver's standings. In 2023, the line up reshuffled where Yasuda was paired with Okusa along with new manager Yorikatsu Tsujiko who sponsored the car with PONOS, while car 11 had Ishikawa and Tomita being the main drivers along with Shiotsu being the third driver.

For 2024, GAINER is set to run a Ferrari 296 GT3, as PONOS Racing with Kei Cozzolino and Ferrari factory driver Lilou Wadoux. Additionally, GAINER set to return with a GT300 version of the Nissan Fairlady Z with Ryuichiro Tomita and Keishi Ishikawa as the drivers for car number 11.

== Race results ==
=== Complete JGTC Results ===
(key) (Races in bold indicate pole position) (Races in italics indicate fastest lap)

Year	Car	Tyres	Class	No.	Drivers	1	2	3	4	5	6	7	8	9	Pos	Pts
1999	Ferrari F355 GT	Y	GT300	111	(Japan) Junichi Ikura (Japan) Yusei Maki	SUZ	FUJ; Ret	SUG	MIN	FUJ; 16	OKA; NC	MOT; Ret	NC1		NC	0
2000	Ferrari F355 GT	Y	GT300	111	(Japan) Junichi Ikura (Japan) Yusei Maki	MOT; 9	FUJ; Ret	SUG	NC1	FUJ; 15	OKA; 11	MIN	SUZ; 14		15th	2
2001	Porsche 996 GT3-R	Y	GT300	11	(Japan) Junichi Ikura (Japan) Koji Ushikubo (Japan) Yusei Maki	OKA; 14	FUJ; 13	SUG; 8	NC1	FUJ; 14	MOT; 15	SUZ; 9	MIN; DNA		15th	5
2003	Ferrari 360	Y	GT300	11	(Japan) Hideshi Matsuda (Japan) Tetsuya Tanaka	OKA; 13	FUJ; 4	SUG; Ret	FUJ; 2	FUJ; 20	MOT; Ret	**AUT**; 2	SUZ; 12		8th	46
2004	Ferrari 360	D	GT300	10	(Japan) Tetsuya Tanaka (Japan) Atsushi Yogo	OKA; 1	SUG; 8	SEP; 5	TOK; 5	MOT; 3	AUT; 3	SUZ; 18	NC1	NC2	3rd	78
2004	Ferrari 360	D	GT300	11	(Japan) Hideshi Matsuda (Japan) Ichigo Suga	OKA; 10	SUG; 3	SEP; 8	TOK; 8	MOT; 20	AUT; 7	SUZ; 14	NC1	NC2	3rd	78

=== Complete Super GT Results ===
(key) (Races in bold indicate pole position) (Races in italics indicate fastest lap)

Year	Car	Tyres	Class	No.	Drivers	1	2	3	4	5	6	7	8	9	10	Pos	Points
2005	Ferrari 360	D	GT300	10	(Japan) Yasutaka Hinoi (Japan) Hideshi Matsuda (Japan) Taku Bamba	OKA; 13	FUJ; 17	SEP; Ret	SUG; 10	MOT; 5	FUJ; Ret	AUT; 19	SUZ; 5			4th	72
2005	Ferrari 360	D	GT300	11	(Japan) Tetsuya Tanaka (Italy) Paolo Montin	OKA; 6	FUJ; 4	SEP; 4	SUG; Ret	MOT; 9	FUJ; 2	AUT; 5	SUZ; 1			4th	72
2006	Ferrari 360	D	GT300	10	(Japan) Hiromi Kozono (Japan) Naofumi Omoto (Japan) Eiji Yamada	SUZ; 19	OKA; 16	FUJ; Ret	SEP; 14	SUG; Ret	SUZ; Ret	MOT; 19	AUT	FUJ; 22		NC	0
2006	Ferrari 360	D	GT300	11	(Japan) Tetsuya Tanaka (Japan) Takayuki Aoki	SUZ; Ret	OKA; 2	FUJ; 19	SEP; 17	SUG; 16	SUZ; 9	MOT; 1	AUT; 19	FUJ; 16		9th	42
2007	Ferrari 360	Y	GT300	11	(Japan) Masayuki Ueda (Japan) Hideshi Matsuda (Japan) Ichijo Suga	SUZ; 22	OKA; 16	FUJ; 15	SEP; 18	SUG; 10	SUZ; DSQ	MOT; 13	AUT; 12	FUJ; 21		32nd	1
2008	Ferrari F430	Y	GT300	11	(Japan) Tetsuya Tanaka (Japan) Masayuki Ueda	SUZ; 12	OKA; 20	FUJ; 12	SEP; 17	SUG; 12	SUZ; 7	MOT; 24	**AUT**; 8	FUJ; 12		15th	20
2009	Ferrari 360	Y	GT300	10	(Japan) Masayuki Ueda (Japan) Masataka Kawaguchi	OKA; Ret	SUZ; 16	FUJ; 15	SEP; 9	SUG; Ret	SUZ; 15	FUJ; 17	AUT; 19	MOT; 13		16th	14
2009	Ferrari F430	Y	GT300	11	(Japan) Tetsuya Tanaka (Japan) Katsuyuki Hiranaka	**OKA**; 4	SUZ; 4	FUJ; Ret	SEP; 8	SUG; 3	SUZ; 5	FUJ; 2	AUT; 1	MOT; 4		3rd	103
2010	Ferrari F430	D	GT300	11	(Japan) Tetsuya Tanaka (Japan) Katsuyuki Hiranaka	SUZ; Ret	OKA; 7	FUJ; 6	**SEP**; 4	SUG; 5	SUZ; 8	FUJ; C	MOT; 4	NC1; 1	NC2; 1	7th	52
2011	Ferrari F430 GT2	Y	GT300	10	(Japan) Masayuki Ueda (Japan) Masataka Kawaguchi	OKA	FUJ	SEP	SUG	SUZ	FUJ; 18	AUT; 18	MOT; 17	NC1	NC2	NC	0
2011	Ferrari 458 Italia GT2	D	GT300	11	(Japan) Tetsuya Tanaka (Japan) Katsuyuki Hiranaka	OKA; 2	**FUJ**; 2	SEP; 2	SUG; 7	SUZ; 4	FUJ; 22	AUT; 2	MOT; 3	**NC1**; 4	NC2; 3	2nd	105
2012	Audi R8 LMS ultra	D	GT300	11	(Japan) Tetsuya Tanaka (Japan) Katsuyuki Hiranaka (Japan) Atsushi Yogo	OKA; 1	**FUJ**; 5	SEP; 7	SUG; 6	SUZ; 5	FUJ; 7	AUT; 16	MOT; 13	NC1; 7	NC2; 6	6th	65
2013	Mercedes-Benz SLS AMG GT3	D	GT300	10	(Japan) Tetsuya Tanaka (Japan) Masayuki Ueda (Japan) Masataka Kawaguchi	OKA; 15	FUJ; 10	SEP; 7	SUG; 10	SUZ; 13	**FUJ**; 6	**AUT**; 20	MOT; 12	NC1; 11	NC2; 6	15th	27
2013	Mercedes-Benz SLS AMG GT3	D	GT300	11	(Japan) Katsuyuki Hiranaka (Sweden) Björn Wirdheim	OKA; 1	FUJ; 6	SEP; 3	SUG; 13	SUZ; 6	FUJ; 7	AUT; 4	MOT; 1	NC1; 2	NC2; 2	2nd	100
2014	Mercedes-Benz SLS AMG GT3	D	GT300	10	(Japan) Masayuki Ueda (Japan) Hideki Yamauchi	OKA; 10	FUJ; 20	AUT; 12	**SUG**; 13	FUJ; 14	SUZ; 4	BUR; 11	MOT; 5			15th	32
2014	Mercedes-Benz SLS AMG GT3	D	GT300	11	(Japan) Katsuyuki Hiranaka (Sweden) Björn Wirdheim	OKA; 3	FUJ; 2	AUT; 3	SUG; Ret	FUJ; 2	SUZ; 10	BUR; 8	**MOT**; 1			1st	97
2015	Nissan GT-R GT3	D	GT300	10	(Macau) André Couto (Japan) Katsumasa Chiyo (Japan) Ryuichiro Tomita	**OKA**; 7	FUJ; 1	CHA; 2	FUJ; 6	SUZ; 1	SUG; 6	AUT; 2	MOT; 6			1st	116
2015	Mercedes-Benz SLS AMG GT3	D	GT300	11	(Japan) Katsuyuki Hiranaka (Sweden) Björn Wirdheim	OKA; 12	FUJ; 3	CHA; 4	FUJ; 3	SUZ; 11	SUG; 3	AUT; Ret	MOT; 3			4th	71
2016	Nissan GT-R GT3	D	GT300	0	(Macau) André Couto (Japan) Ryūichirō Tomita	OKA; 8	FUJ; 5	SUG; 11	FUJ; 9	SUZ; 3	CHA; 4	MOT; 5	MOT; 15			7th	62
2016	Mercedes-Benz SLS AMG GT3	D	GT300	11	(Japan) Katsuyuki Hiranaka (Sweden) Björn Wirdheim	OKA; 4	FUJ; Ret	SUG; 4	FUJ; 7	SUZ; Ret	CHA; 9	**MOT**; 4	MOT; 10			9th	49
2017	Nissan GT-R GT3	D	GT300	10	(Japan) Hiroki Yoshida (Japan) Ryūichirō Tomita	OKA; 6	FUJ; 24	AUT; 15	SUG; 21	FUJ; 16	SUZ; 5	CHA; 18	MOT; 19			17th	29
2017	Mercedes-Benz SLS AMG GT3	D	GT300	11	(Japan) Katsuyuki Hiranaka (Sweden) Björn Wirdheim	OKA; 18	FUJ; 2	AUT; 22	SUG; 1	FUJ; 17	SUZ; 9	CHA; 8	MOT; 7			5th	65
2018	Nissan GT-R Nismo GT3	Y	GT300	10	(Japan) Hiroki Yoshida (Japan) Kazuki Hoshino	OKA; 13	**FUJ**; 11	SUZ; 10	CHA; Ret	FUJ; 8	SUG; 2	AUT; 9	MOT; 15			14th	41
2018	Nissan GT-R Nismo GT3	D	GT300	11	(Japan) Katsuyuki Hiranaka (Japan) Hironobu Yasuda	OKA; 5	FUJ; 3	SUZ; 16	CHA; 1	FUJ; 17	SUG; 19	AUT; 6	MOT; 5			5th	70
2019	Nissan GT-R Nismo GT3	Y	GT300	10	(Japan) Kazuki Hoshino (Japan) Keishi Ishikawa	OKA; Ret	FUJ; 10	SUZ; 12	BUR; 1	FUJ; 14	AUT; 10	SUG; 15	MOT; 16	NC1	NC2	11th	39
2019	Nissan GT-R Nismo GT3	D	GT300	11	(Japan) Katsuyuki Hiranaka (Japan) Hironobu Yasuda	OKA; 21	FUJ; 1	SUZ; 9	BUR; 8	FUJ; 9	AUT; 15	SUG; 21	MOT; 1	NC1	NC2	4th	70
2020	Nissan GT-R Nismo GT3	Y	GT300	10	(Japan) Kazuki Hoshino (Japan) Keishi Ishikawa	FUJ; 5	FUJ; 10	SUZ; 5	MOT; 11	FUJ; 12	SUZ; 21	MOT; 7	FUJ; 6			11th	46
2020	Nissan GT-R Nismo GT3	D	GT300	11	(Japan) Katsuyuki Hiranaka (Japan) Hironobu Yasuda	FUJ; 2	FUJ; 21	SUZ; 1	MOT; 6	FUJ; 10	SUZ; 15	MOT; 9	FUJ; 18			5th	65
2021	Nissan GT-R Nismo GT3	D	GT300	10	(Japan) Kazuki Hoshino (Japan) Keishi Ishikawa	OKA; 10	FUJ; 5	MOT; 14	SUZ; 11	SUG; 26	AUT; 7	MOT; 10	FUJ; 10			17th	35
2021	Nissan GT-R Nismo GT3	D	GT300	11	(Japan) Katsuyuki Hiranaka (Japan) Hironobu Yasuda	**OKA**; 4	FUJ; 16	**MOT**; 2	SUZ; 26	SUG; 10	AUT; 5	MOT; 8	FUJ; 8			7th	59
2022	Nissan GT-R Nismo GT3	D	GT300	10	(Japan) Riki Okusa (Japan) Ryuichiro Tomita (Japan) Yusuke Shiotsu	OKA; 6	FUJ; 1	SUZ; 15	FUJ; 22	**SUZ**; 2	SUG; 3	AUT; 7	MOT; 8			2nd	68.5
2022	Nissan GT-R Nismo GT3	D	GT300	11	(Japan) Hironobu Yasuda (Japan) Keishi Ishikawa	OKA; 10	FUJ; 4	SUZ; Ret	FUJ; 2	SUZ; 16	SUG; 2	AUT; 14	MOT; 14			5th	54.5
2023	Nissan GT-R Nismo GT3	D	GT300	10	(Japan) Hironobu Yasuda (Japan) Riki Okusa	OKA; 11	FUJ; 5	SUZ; 8	FUJ; 7	SUZ; 13	SUG; 9	AUT; 10	MOT; 16			13th	39
2023	Nissan GT-R Nismo GT3	D	GT300	11	(Japan) Ryuichiro Tomita (Japan) Keishi Ishikawa (Japan) Yusuke Shiotsu	OKA; Ret	FUJ; 17	SUZ; 5	FUJ; 1	SUZ; 15	SUG; 12	AUT; 9	MOT; 13			11th	46
2024	Nissan Fairlady Z GT300 (RZ34)	D	GT300	11	(Japan) Ryuichiro Tomita (Japan) Keishi Ishikawa (Japan) Kazuki Oki	OKA; WD	FUJ; Ret	SUZ; Ret	FUJ; 10	SUG; Ret	AUT; 7	MOT; 23	SUZ; 8			19th	18
2024	Ferrari 296 GT3	M	GT300	45	(Japan) Kei Cozzolino (France) Lilou Wadoux	OKA; 11	FUJ; 9	SUZ; 6	FUJ; 11	SUG; 2	AUT; 12	MOT; 12	SUZ; 22			11th	44
2025	Nissan Fairlady Z GT300 (RZ34)	D	GT300	11	(Japan) Ryuichiro Tomita (Japan) Kazuki Oki	OKA; 11	FUJ; 14	SEP	FS1; 12	FS2; 19	SUZ; 10	SUG; 5	AUT; DNS	MOT; 24		18th	42

^{‡} Half points awarded as less than 75% of race distance was completed. * Season still in progress.

=== Complete 24 Hours of Le Mans Results ===
Year	Team	Vehicle	Tyres	Class	No.	Drivers	Laps	Overall Position	Class Position
2005	(Japan) Jim Gainer International	Dome S101HB; Mugen MF408S 4.0L V8	**D**	LMP1	5	(Japan) Ryo Michigami (Japan) Seiji Ara (Japan) Katsutomo Kaneishi	193	DNF	DNF

=== Complete Suzuka 10 Hours / Suzuka 1000 km Results ===
Year	Team	Vehicle	Tyres	Class	No.	Drivers	Laps	Overall Position	Class Position
1999	(Japan) TEAM GAINER	Ferrari F355	Y	GT300	111	(Japan) Junichi Ikura (Japan) Yusei Maki (Japan) Takahiko Date	138	18th	4th
2000	(Japan) TEAM GAINER	Ferrari F355	Y	GT300	111	(Japan) Junichi Ikura (Japan) Yusei Maki (Japan) Takahiko Date	112	DNF	DNF
2001	(Japan) TEAM GAINER	Porsche 911 GT3 R (996)	Y	GT300	11	(Japan) Junichi Ikura (Japan) Koji Ushikubo (Japan) Takahiko Date	73	DNF	DNF
2003	(Japan) TEAM GAINER	Ferrari 360 Modena	Y	GT300	11	(Japan) Hideshi Matsuda (Japan) Tetsuya Tanaka	78	DNF	DNF
2018	(Japan) GAINER	Nissan GT-R NISMO GT3 MY2018	P	Pro Cup	11	(Japan) Katsuyuki Hiranaka (Japan) Kazuki Hoshino (Japan) Hironobu Yasuda	274	14th	12th
2019	(Japan) Planex SmaCam Racing	McLaren 720S GT3	P	Pro Cup	11	(Finland) Mika Häkkinen (Japan) Hiroaki Ishiura (Japan) Katsuaki Kubota	268	22nd	18th
