= Kazuki Hoshino =

Japanese racing driver

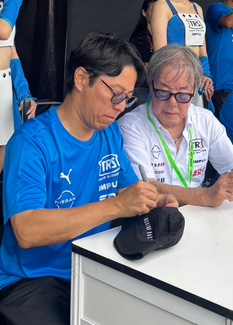
Hoshino (Left) and his father, Kazuyoshi Hoshino at the 2025 Super GT Malaysia Festival

Kazuki Hoshino (星野一樹 - Hoshino Kazuki; born October 13, 1977) is a semi-retired Japanese professional racing driver and current team principal (team director) of Team Impul in the Super GT Series and Super Formula Championship. He is the son of former racing driver and Impul co-founder, Kazuyoshi Hoshino. He is a two-time Super GT GT300 class champion (2008, 2010), a four-time Super Taikyu Series champion (2004 ST-3 class, 2014, 2018, and 2019 ST-X class), and a former Nissan factory GT500 driver with his father's team from 2006 to 2007 where he won the 2006 Suzuka 1000km. He also raced in the Formula Nippon (now Super Formula) Championship for Impul in 2006.

Hoshino announced his retirement from racing in Super GT after the 2021 season, and became the Technical Director at Team Impul in 2022. That season, Impul won its first GT500 class championship in 27 years. In 2023, Hoshino succeeded his father as the team director of Impul's Super GT and Super Formula teams. Hoshino also announced the creation of a new team in Super Taikyu, which would compete in the ST-Z (GT4) class with a new Nissan Z GT4.

Outside of Japan, Hoshino competed in the Nürburgring 24 Hours on several occasions, finishing ninth overall in 2015 alongside Michael Krumm, Lucas Ordoñez, and Alex Buncombe. In 2013, Hoshino participated in the Blancpain Endurance Series (now GT World Challenge Europe Endurance Cup with JRM Motorsport alongside Steven Kane and Peter Dumbreck.

== Complete JGTC/Super GT results ==
(key) (Races in bold indicate pole position) (Races in italics indicate fastest lap)

year	Team	Car	Class	1	2	3	4	5	6	7	8	9	DC	Pts
2003	Team Daishin	Nissan Silvia	GT300	TAI; 7	FSW; 6	SUG; 7	FSW; 4	FSW; 2	TRM; 4	AUT; 10	SUZ; 4		6th	61
2004	Team Daishin	Nissan Z	GT300	TAI; 8	SUG; 11	SEP; 7	TOK; 9	TRM; 17	AUT; 4	SUZ; 6			7th	29
2005	MOLA	Nissan Z	GT300	OKA; 8	FSW; 7	SEP; 6	SUG; Ret	**TRM**; 1	FSW; 4	AUT; 6	SUZ; 4		5th	59
2006	Team Impul	Nissan Z	GT500	SUZ; 13	OKA; 6	FSW; 5	SEP; 3	SUG; 6	**SUZ**; 1	TRM; 13	AUT; 4	FSW; 12	8th	67
2007	Team Impul	Nissan Z	GT500	SUZ; 11	OKA; 8	FSW; 10	SEP; 3	SUG; 7	SUZ; Ret	TRM; Ret	AUT; Ret	**FSW**; 2	11th	34
2008	MOLA	Nissan Z	GT300	SUZ; Ret	OKA; 4	FSW; 2	SEP; 2	SUG; 5	SUZ; 1	TRM; 7	AUT; 4	FSW; 6	**1st**	**78**
2009	Team Nishizawa MOLA	Nissan Z	GT300	OKA; 7	SUZ; 3	FSW; 6	SEP; 4	SUG; 6	SUZ; 1	FSW; 9	AUT; 8	TRM; 7	7th	62
2010	Hasemi Motor Sport	Nissan Z	GT300	SUZ; 5	OKA; 3	FSW; 5	SEP; 5	SUG; 2	SUZ; Ret	FSW; C	**TRM**; 1		**1st**	**64**
2011	A speed	Aston Martin Vantage GT2	GT300	OKA; 1	FSW; Ret	SEP; Ret	SUG; 8	SUZ; 12	FSW; 9	AUT; 11	TRM; 4		8th	33
2012	A speed	Aston Martin Vantage GT2	GT300	OKA; 11									**3rd**	**73**
2012	A speed	Aston Martin Vantage GT3	GT300		FSW; 3	SEP; 3	SUG; Ret	SUZ; 1	FSW; Ret	AUT; 1	TRM; 5		**3rd**	**73**
2013	NDDP Racing	Nissan GT-R NISMO GT3	GT300	OKA; Ret	FSW; Ret	SEP; 10	SUG; 9	SUZ; 9	FSW; 5	FSW	**AUT**; Ret	TRM; 9	17th	14
2014	NDDP Racing	Nissan GT-R NISMO GT3	GT300	OKA; 4	**FSW**; 5	AUT; 4	SUG; 9	FSW; 10	SUZ; 19	CHA; 1	TRM; 8		4th	48
2015	NDDP Racing	Nissan GT-R NISMO GT3	GT300	**OKA**; 8	FSW; 2	CHA; 1	FSW; Ret	SUZ; 14	SUG; 8	AUT; 1	TRM; Ret		4th	61
2016	NDDP Racing	Nissan GT-R NISMO GT3	GT300	OKA; 10	FSW; 1	SUG; 5	FSW; 6	SUZ; 10	CHA; 2	TRM; 13	TRM; 6		4th	54
2017	NDDP Racing	Nissan GT-R NISMO GT3	GT300	OKA; 7	FSW; 6	AUT; 9	SUG; 8	FSW; Ret	SUZ; 14	CHA; 9	TRM; 10		17th	17
2018	GAINER	Nissan GT-R NISMO GT3	GT300	OKA; 13	FSW; 11	SUZ; 10	CHA; Ret	FSW; 8	SUG; 2	AUT; 9	TRM; 15		16th	22
2019	GAINER	Nissan GT-R NISMO GT3	GT300	OKA; Ret	FSW; 10	SUZ; 12	CHA; 1	FSW; 14	AUT; 10	SUG; 15	TRM; 16		14th	22
2020	GAINER	Nissan GT-R NISMO GT3	GT300	FSW; 5	FSW; 10	SUZ; 5	TRM; 11	FSW; 12	SUZ; 21	TRM; 7	FSW; 6		12th	22
2021	GAINER	Nissan GT-R NISMO GT3	GT300	OKA; 10	FUJ1; 5	MOT1; 14	SUZ; 11	SUG; 26	AUT; 7	MOT2; 10	FUJ2; 10		18th	13
