= 2023 SRO Japan Cup =

Motor racing competition season

The 2023 Fanatec Japan Cup was the second season of the Japan Cup Series, an auto racing series for grand tourer cars in Japan, co-promoted by the SRO Motorsports Group and Team Asia One GT Management. The races are contested with GT3-spec and GT4-spec cars. The season began on 17 June at the Fuji Speedway in Shizuoka and is scheduled to end on 20 August at Okayama International Circuit in Okayama.

== Calendar ==
Round	Circuit	Date
1	(Japan) Fuji Speedway, Oyama, Shizuoka	17–18 June
2	(Japan) Suzuka International Racing Course, Suzuka, Mie	15–16 July
3	(Japan) Mobility Resort Motegi, Motegi, Tochigi	22–23 July
4	(Japan) Okayama International Circuit, Mimasaka, Okayama	19–20 August

== Entry list ==
Team	Car	Engine	No.	Drivers	Class	Rounds
GT3
(Japan) Car Guy Racing	Ferrari 296 GT3 1 Ferrari 488 GT3 Evo 2020 3	Ferrari F163CE 3.0 L Turbo V6 1 Ferrari F154CB 3.9 L Turbo V8 3	1	(Japan) Kei Cozzolino	PA	1, 3–4
(Japan) Car Guy Racing	Ferrari 296 GT3 1 Ferrari 488 GT3 Evo 2020 3	Ferrari F163CE 3.0 L Turbo V6 1 Ferrari F154CB 3.9 L Turbo V8 3	1	(Japan) Takeshi Kimura	PA	1, 3–4
(Japan) BMW M Team Studie	BMW M4 GT3	BMW S58B30T0 3.0 L Turbo I6	5	(Japan) Seiji Ara	PA	All
(Japan) BMW M Team Studie	BMW M4 GT3	BMW S58B30T0 3.0 L Turbo I6	5	(Japan) Tomohide Yamaguchi	PA	All
(Japan) Comet Racing	Ferrari 488 GT3 Evo 2020	Ferrari F154CB 3.9 L Turbo V8	7	(Japan) Yorikatsu Tsujiko	Am	All
(Japan) Comet Racing	Ferrari 488 GT3 Evo 2020	Ferrari F154CB 3.9 L Turbo V8	7	(Japan) Yusuke Yamasaki	Am	All
(Japan) Bingo Racing	Chevrolet Corvette C7 GT3-R	Chevrolet 6.2 L V8	9	(Japan) Akira Iida	PA	1
(Japan) Bingo Racing	Chevrolet Corvette C7 GT3-R	Chevrolet 6.2 L V8	9	(Japan) Shinji Takei	PA	1
(Japan) ABSSA Motorsport	McLaren 720S GT3	McLaren M840T 4.0L Turbo V8	16	(Japan) Keita Sawa	PA	1–2
(Japan) ABSSA Motorsport	McLaren 720S GT3	McLaren M840T 4.0L Turbo V8	16	(Japan) Kiwamu Katayama	PA	1
(Japan) ABSSA Motorsport	McLaren 720S GT3	McLaren M840T 4.0L Turbo V8	16	(Japan) Masataka Inoue	PA	2
(Japan) CREF Motor Sport	McLaren 720S GT3	McLaren M840T 4.0L Turbo V8	17	(Japan) Masataka Inoue	PA	1, 3
(Japan) CREF Motor Sport	McLaren 720S GT3	McLaren M840T 4.0L Turbo V8	17	(Japan) Yuko Suzuki	PA	1, 3
(Japan) CREF Motor Sport	McLaren 720S GT3	McLaren M840T 4.0L Turbo V8	17	(Japan) Katsuaki Kubota	PA	2
(Japan) CREF Motor Sport	McLaren 720S GT3	McLaren M840T 4.0L Turbo V8	17	(Japan) Atsushi Miyake	PA	2
(Japan) Porsche Centre Okazaki	Porsche 911 GT3 R (992)	Porsche M97/80 4.2 L Flat-6	18	(Japan) Yuta Kamimura	PA	All
(Japan) Porsche Centre Okazaki	Porsche 911 GT3 R (992)	Porsche M97/80 4.2 L Flat-6	18	(Japan) Hiroaki Nagai	PA	All
(Japan) The Spirit of FFF Racing	Lamborghini Huracán GT3 Evo	Lamborghini DGF 5.2 L V10	19	(Japan) Mineki Okura	Am	All
(Japan) The Spirit of FFF Racing	Lamborghini Huracán GT3 Evo	Lamborghini DGF 5.2 L V10	19	(Japan) Hiroshi Hamaguchi	Am	1, 3–4
(Japan) The Spirit of FFF Racing	Lamborghini Huracán GT3 Evo	Lamborghini DGF 5.2 L V10	19	(Japan) Takuya Shirasaka	Am	2
(Japan) NK Racing	Porsche 911 GT3 R (992)	Porsche M97/80 4.2 L Flat-6	25	(Japan) Tsubasa Kondo	PA	All
(Japan) NK Racing	Porsche 911 GT3 R (992)	Porsche M97/80 4.2 L Flat-6	25	(Japan) Kiyoshi Uchiyama	PA	All
(Japan) D'station Racing	Aston Martin Vantage AMR GT3	Aston Martin M177 4.0 L Turbo V8	47	(Japan) Tomonobu Fujii	PA	All
(Japan) D'station Racing	Aston Martin Vantage AMR GT3	Aston Martin M177 4.0 L Turbo V8	47	(Japan) Satoshi Hoshino	PA	All
(Japan) Team Uematsu	McLaren 720S GT3	McLaren M840T 4.0L Turbo V8	55	(Japan) Tadao Uematsu	Am	1, 3
(Japan) LM Corsa	Ferrari 296 GT3	Ferrari F163CE 3.0 L Turbo V6	60	(Japan) Kei Nakanishi	PA	All
(Japan) LM Corsa	Ferrari 296 GT3	Ferrari F163CE 3.0 L Turbo V6	60	(Japan) Shigekazu Wakisaka	PA	All
(Japan) K-tunes Racing	Lexus RC F GT3	Toyota 2UR-GSE 5.4 L V8	96	(Japan) Morio Nitta	PA	1–2, 4
(Japan) K-tunes Racing	Lexus RC F GT3	Toyota 2UR-GSE 5.4 L V8	96	(Japan) Kazunori Suenaga	PA	1–2, 4
(Japan) RunUp Sports	Nissan GT-R Nismo GT3	Nissan VR38DETT 3.8 L Turbo V6	360	(Japan) Masaaki Nishikawa	Am	All
(Japan) RunUp Sports	Nissan GT-R Nismo GT3	Nissan VR38DETT 3.8 L Turbo V6	360	(Japan) Atsushi Tanaka	Am	All
(Japan) Team 5ZIGEN	Nissan GT-R Nismo GT3	Nissan VR38DETT 3.8 L Turbo V6	500	(Japan) "Hirobon"	PA	1–2, 4
(Japan) Team 5ZIGEN	Nissan GT-R Nismo GT3	Nissan VR38DETT 3.8 L Turbo V6	500	(Japan) Shintaro Kawabata	PA	1–2, 4
GT4
(Japan) CREF Motor Sport	McLaren Artura GT4	McLaren M630 3.0 L Turbo V6	27	(Japan) Masataka Inoue	SA	4
(Japan) CREF Motor Sport	McLaren Artura GT4	McLaren M630 3.0 L Turbo V6	27	(Japan) Yuko Suzuki	SA	4
(Japan) D'station Racing	Aston Martin Vantage AMR GT4	Aston Martin M177 4.0 L Turbo V8	48	(Japan) Kenji Hama	Am	4
(Japan) D'station Racing	Aston Martin Vantage AMR GT4	Aston Martin M177 4.0 L Turbo V8	48	(Japan) Tatsuya Hoshino	Am	4
(Japan) YZ Racing with Studie	BMW M4 GT4 Gen II	BMW S58B30T0 3.0 L Turbo I6	50	(Japan) Masaki Kano	SA	All
(Japan) YZ Racing with Studie	BMW M4 GT4 Gen II	BMW S58B30T0 3.0 L Turbo I6	50	(Japan) Manabu Orido	SA	All
(Japan) Akiland Racing	Toyota GR Supra GT4	BMW B58B30 3.0 L Turbo I6	71	(Japan) Masayoshi Oyama	SA	1–2, 4
(Japan) Akiland Racing	Toyota GR Supra GT4	BMW B58B30 3.0 L Turbo I6	71	(Japan) Ryohei Sakaguchi	SA	1–2, 4
(Japan) Comet Racing	Mercedes-AMG GT4	Mercedes-AMG M178 4.0 L Turbo V8	83	(Japan) Kazuki Oki	SA	4
(Japan) Comet Racing	Mercedes-AMG GT4	Mercedes-AMG M178 4.0 L Turbo V8	83	(Japan) Risa Oogushi	SA	4
(Japan) K-tunes Racing	Toyota GR Supra GT4	BMW B58B30 3.0 L Turbo I6	97	(Japan) Hiromitsu Fujii	Am	1–2
(Japan) K-tunes Racing	Toyota GR Supra GT4	BMW B58B30 3.0 L Turbo I6	97	(Japan) Masanori Nogami	Am	1–2
(Japan) Checkshop Caymania Racing	Porsche 718 Cayman GT4 RS Clubsport	Porsche MDG.GA 4.0 L Flat-6	718	(Japan) Sho Kobayashi	Am	All
(Japan) Checkshop Caymania Racing	Porsche 718 Cayman GT4 RS Clubsport	Porsche MDG.GA 4.0 L Flat-6	718	(Japan) Naohiko Otsuka	Am	All

Icon	Class
Drivers
PA	Pro-Am Cup
SA	Silver-Am Cup
Am	Am Cup

== Race results ==
Bold indicates overall winner for each car class (GT3 and GT4).

Round		Circuit	Pole position	Pro/Am winners	Am winners	GT4 Silver-Am winner	GT4 Am winner
1	R1	(Japan) Fuji Speedway	(Japan) No. 9 Bingo Racing	**(Japan) No. 9 Bingo Racing**	(Japan) No. 7 Comet Racing	**(Japan) No. 50 YZ Racing with Studie**	(Japan) No. 718 Checkshop Caymania Racing
1	R1	(Japan) Fuji Speedway	(Japan) Akira Iida (Japan) Shinji Takei	**(Japan) Akira Iida** **(Japan) Shinji Takei**	(Japan) Yorikatsu Tsujiko (Japan) Yusuke Yamasaki	**(Japan) Masaki Kano** **(Japan) Manabu Orido**	(Japan) Sho Kobayashi (Japan) Naohiko Otsuka
1	R2	(Japan) Fuji Speedway	(Japan) No. 1 CarGuy Racing	**(Japan) No. 88 BMW M Team Studie**	(Japan) No. 7 Comet Racing	(Japan) No. 71 Akiland Racing	**(Japan) No. 718 Checkshop Caymania Racing**
1	R2	(Japan) Fuji Speedway	(Japan) Kei Cozzolino (Japan) Takeshi Kimura	**(Japan) Seiji Ara** **(Japan) Tomohide Yamaguchi**	(Japan) Yorikatsu Tsujiko (Japan) Yusuke Yamasaki	(Japan) Masayoshi Oyama (Japan) Ryohei Sakaguchi	**(Japan) Sho Kobayashi** **(Japan) Naohiko Otsuka**
2	R1	(Japan) Suzuka	(Japan) No. 16 ABSSA Motorsport	**(Japan) No. 500 Team 5ZIGEN**	(Japan) No. 7 Comet Racing	**(Japan) No. 50 YZ Racing with Studie**	(Japan) No. 718 Checkshop Caymania Racing
2	R1	(Japan) Suzuka	(Japan) Keita Sawa (Japan) Masataka Inoue	**(Japan) "Hirobon"** **(Japan) Shintaro Kawabata**	(Japan) Yorikatsu Tsujiko (Japan) Yusuke Yamasaki	**(Japan) Masaki Kano** **(Japan) Manabu Orido**	(Japan) Sho Kobayashi (Japan) Naohiko Otsuka
2	R2	(Japan) Suzuka	(Japan) No. 500 Team 5ZIGEN	**(Japan) No. 48 D'Station Racing**	(Japan) No. 7 Comet Racing	**(Japan) No. 50 YZ Racing with Studie**	(Japan) No. 718 Checkshop Caymania Racing
2	R2	(Japan) Suzuka	(Japan) "Hirobon" (Japan) Shintaro Kawabata	**(Japan) Tomonobu Fujii** **(Japan) Satoshi Hoshino**	(Japan) Yorikatsu Tsujiko (Japan) Yusuke Yamasaki	**(Japan) Masaki Kano** **(Japan) Manabu Orido**	(Japan) Sho Kobayashi (Japan) Naohiko Otsuka
3	R1	(Japan) Motegi	(Japan) No. 19 The Spirit of FFF Racing	**(Japan) No. 18 Porsche Centre Okazaki**	(Japan) No. 19 The Spirit of FFF Racing	**(Japan) No. 50 YZ Racing with Studie**	(Japan) No. 718 Checkshop Caymania Racing
3	R1	(Japan) Motegi	(Japan) Hiroshi Hamaguchi (Japan) Mineki Okura	**(Japan) Yuta Kamimura** **(Japan) Hiroaki Nagai**	(Japan) Hiroshi Hamaguchi (Japan) Mineki Okura	**(Japan) Masaki Kano** **(Japan) Manabu Orido**	(Japan) Sho Kobayashi (Japan) Naohiko Otsuka
3	R2	(Japan) Motegi	(Japan) No. 18 Porsche Centre Okazaki	**(Japan) No. 18 Porsche Centre Okazaki**	(Japan) No. 19 The Spirit of FFF Racing	**(Japan) No. 50 YZ Racing with Studie**	(Japan) No. 718 Checkshop Caymania Racing
3	R2	(Japan) Motegi	(Japan) Yuta Kamimura (Japan) Hiroaki Nagai	**(Japan) Yuta Kamimura** **(Japan) Hiroaki Nagai**	(Japan) Hiroshi Hamaguchi (Japan) Mineki Okura	**(Japan) Masaki Kano** **(Japan) Manabu Orido**	(Japan) Sho Kobayashi (Japan) Naohiko Otsuka
4	R1	(Japan) Okayama	(Japan) No. 500 Team 5ZIGEN	**(Japan) No. 500 Team 5ZIGEN**	(Japan) No. 19 The Spirit of FFF Racing	**(Japan) No. 71 Akiland Racing**	(Japan) No. 718 Checkshop Caymania Racing
4	R1	(Japan) Okayama	(Japan) "Hirobon" (Japan) Shintaro Kawabata	**(Japan) "Hirobon"** **(Japan) Shintaro Kawabata**	(Japan) Hiroshi Hamaguchi (Japan) Mineki Okura	**(Japan) Masayoshi Oyama** **(Japan) Ryohei Sakaguchi**	(Japan) Sho Kobayashi (Japan) Naohiko Otsuka
4	R2	(Japan) Okayama	(Japan) No. 1 CarGuy Racing	**(Japan) No. 88 BMW M Team Studie**	(Japan) No. 19 The Spirit of FFF Racing	**(Japan) No. 50 YZ Racing with Studie**	(Japan) No. 48 D'Station Racing
4	R2	(Japan) Okayama	(Japan) Kei Cozzolino (Japan) Takeshi Kimura	**(Japan) Seiji Ara** **(Japan) Tomohide Yamaguchi**	(Japan) Hiroshi Hamaguchi (Japan) Mineki Okura	**(Japan) Masaki Kano** **(Japan) Manabu Orido**	(Japan) Kenji Hama (Japan) Tatsuya Hoshino

== Championship standings ==
Scoring system

Championship points are awarded for the first ten positions in each race. Entries are required to complete 75% of the winning car's race distance in order to be classified and earn points. Individual drivers are required to participate for a minimum of 25 minutes in order to earn championship points in any race.

Position	**1st**	**2nd**	**3rd**	**4th**	**5th**	**6th**	**7th**	**8th**	**9th**	**10th**
Points	25	18	15	12	10	8	6	4	2	1

=== Drivers' championships ===
==== Overall ====
Pos.	Driver	Team	FUJ (Japan)		SUZ (Japan)		MOT (Japan)		OKA (Japan)		Points
GT3
1	(Japan) Yuta Kamimura (Japan) Hiroaki Nagai	(Japan) No. 18 Porsche Centre Okazaki	4	6	2	3	1	1	3	3	133
2	(Japan) Tomonobu Fujii (Japan) Satoshi Hoshino	(Japan) No. 47 D'station Racing	10	2	Ret	1	3	2	5	4	108
3	(Japan) Seiji Ara (Japan) Tomohide Yamaguchi	(Japan) No. 5 BMW M Team Studie	Ret	1	3	2	Ret	Ret	9	1	85
4	(Japan) Kei Cozzolino (Japan) Takeshi Kimura	(Japan) No. 1 Car Guy Racing	3	3			2	9	2	5	78
5	(Japan) "Hirobon" (Japan) Shintaro Kawabata	(Japan) No. 500 Team 5ZIGEN	9	Ret	1	10			1	2	71
6	(Japan) Tsubasa Kondo (Japan) Kiyoshi Uchiyama	(Japan) No. 25 NK Racing	2	14	5	4	8	7	4	6	70
7	(Japan) Yorikatsu Tsujiko (Japan) Yusuke Yamasaki	(Japan) No. 7 Comet Racing	7	4	8	8	6	6	10	9	45
8	(Japan) Mineki Okura	(Japan) No. 19 The Spirit of FFF Racing	DNS	Ret	Ret		4	3	6	7	41
8	(Japan) Hiroshi Hamaguchi	(Japan) No. 19 The Spirit of FFF Racing	DNS	Ret			4	3	6	7	41
9	(Japan) Kei Nakanishi (Japan) Shigekazu Wakisaka	(Japan) No. 60 LM Corsa	Ret	8	6	6	Ret	4	7		38
10	(Japan) Hiroaki Hatano (Japan) Shinya Hosokawa	(Japan) No. 33 Team GMB	6	10	7	7	7	8			31
11	(Japan) Tadao Uematsu	(Japan) No. 55 Team Uematsu	13	5			5	5			30
12	(Japan) Akira Iida (Japan) Shinji Takei	(Japan) No. 9 Bingo Racing	1	Ret							25
13	(Japan) Katsuaki Kubota (Japan) Atsushi Miyake	(Japan) No. 17 CREF Motor Sport			4	5					22
14	(Japan) Morio Nitta (Japan) Kazunori Suenaga	(Japan) No. 96 K-tunes Racing	8	15	Ret	DNS			8	8	12
15	(Japan) Masaaki Nishikawa (Japan) Atsushi Tanaka	(Japan) No. 360 RunUp Sports	10	9	9	9	10	10		10	10
16	(Japan) Keita Sawa	(Japan) No. 16 ABSSA Motorsport	Ret	7		Ret					6
16	(Japan) Kiwamu Katayama	(Japan) No. 16 ABSSA Motorsport	Ret	7							6
17	(Japan) Masataka Inoue	(Japan) No. 17 CREF Motor Sport (Japan) No. 16 ABSSA Motorsport	Ret	DNS		Ret	9				2
17	(Japan) Yuko Suzuki	(Japan) No. 17 CREF Motor Sport	Ret	DNS			9				2
—	(Japan) Takuya Shirasaka	(Japan) No. 19 The Spirit of FFF Racing			Ret	33					0
GT4
1	(Japan) Masaki Kano (Japan) Manabu Orido	(Japan) No. 50 YZ Racing with Studie	**11**	**DSQ**	**30**	30	26	**28**	5	1	162
2	(Japan) Sho Kobayashi (Japan) Naohiko Otsuka	(Japan) No. 718 Checkshop Caymania Racing	14	11	32	32	**27**	29	3	4	136
3	(Japan) Masayoshi Oyama (Japan) Ryohei Sakaguchi	(Japan) No. 71 Akiland Racing	12	12	31	**Ret**			1	2	87
4	(Japan) Hiromitsu Fujii (Japan) Masanori Nogami	(Japan) No. 97 K-tunes Racing	15	13							27
Guest drivers ineligible to score points
GT4
—	(Japan) Kenji Hama (Japan) Tatsuya Hoshino	(Japan) No. 48 D'station Racing							5	3	—
—	(Japan) Masataka Inoue (Japan) Yuko Suzuki	(Japan) No. 27 CREF Motor Sport							2	Ret	—
—	(Japan) Kazuki Oki (Japan) Risa Oogushi	(Japan) No. 83 Comet Racing							7	6	—
Pos.	Driver	Team	FUJ (Japan)		SUZ (Japan)		MOT (Japan)		OKA (Japan)		Points

Colour	Result
Gold	Winner
Silver	Second place
Bronze	Third place
Green	Points classification
Blue	Non-points classification
Blue	Non-classified finish (NC)
Purple	Retired, not classified (Ret)
Red	Did not qualify (DNQ)
Red	Did not pre-qualify (DNPQ)
Black	Disqualified (DSQ)
White	Did not start (DNS)
White	Withdrew (WD)
White	Race cancelled (C)
Blank	Did not practice (DNP)
Blank	Did not arrive (DNA)
Blank	Excluded (EX)

**Bold** – Pole

Italics – Fastest Lap

Notes:

- † – Drivers did not finish the race, but were classified as they completed more than 90% of the race distance.
