= 2024 SRO Japan Cup =

Motor racing competition season

The 2024 SRO Japan Cup was the third season of the SRO Japan Cup, an auto racing series for grand tourer cars in Japan, co-promoted by the SRO Motorsports Group and Team Asia One GT Management. The races are contested with GT3-spec and GT4-spec cars. The season began on 8 June at the Sportsland SUGO in Miyagi and is scheduled to end on 25 August at Okayama International Circuit in Okayama.

Starting from this season, the Japan Cup had separated from the main GTWCA race, and would run as a stand-alone race.

== Calendar ==
Round	Circuit	Date
1	(Japan) Sportsland SUGO, Murata, Miyagi	8–9 June
2	(Japan) Fuji Speedway, Oyama, Shizuoka	22–23 June
3	(Japan) Suzuka International Racing Course, Suzuka, Mie	6–7 July
4	(Japan) Okayama International Circuit, Mimasaka, Okayama	24–25 August

== Entry list ==
Team	Car	Engine	No.	Drivers	Class	Rounds
GT3
(Japan) Comet Racing	Ferrari 296 GT3	Ferrari F163CE 3.0 L Turbo V6	7	(Japan) Yorikatsu Tsujiko	Am	All
(Japan) Comet Racing	Ferrari 296 GT3	Ferrari F163CE 3.0 L Turbo V6	7	(Japan) Yusuke Yamasaki	Am	All
(Japan) Bingo Racing	Callaway Corvette C7 GT3-R	Chevrolet 6.2 L V8	9	(Japan) Ukyo Sasahara	PA	1
(Japan) Bingo Racing	Callaway Corvette C7 GT3-R	Chevrolet 6.2 L V8	9	(Japan) Shinji Takei	PA	1
(Japan) Bingo Racing	Callaway Corvette C7 GT3-R	Chevrolet 6.2 L V8	9	(Japan) Shinji Takei	Am	2–4
(Japan) Bingo Racing	Callaway Corvette C7 GT3-R	Chevrolet 6.2 L V8	9	(Japan) "Motoki"	Am	2–4
(Japan) D'station Racing	Aston Martin Vantage AMR GT3 Evo	Aston Martin M177 4.0 L Turbo V8	47	(Japan) Kenji Hama	Am	1–2
(Japan) D'station Racing	Aston Martin Vantage AMR GT3 Evo	Aston Martin M177 4.0 L Turbo V8	47	(Japan) Tatsuya Hoshino	Am	1–2
(Japan) Team MACCHINA	McLaren 720S GT3	McLaren M840T 4.0L Turbo V8	55	(Japan) Tadao Uematsu	Am	All
(Japan) Team DAISHIN with GTNET Motorsports	Nissan GT-R Nismo GT3	Nissan VR38DETT 3.8 L Turbo V6	81	(Japan) Nobuyuki Oyagi	Am	2, 4
(Japan) Team DAISHIN with GTNET Motorsports	Nissan GT-R Nismo GT3	Nissan VR38DETT 3.8 L Turbo V6	81	(Japan) Ryuichiro Oyagi	Am	2, 4
(Japan) K-tunes Racing	Lexus RC F GT3	Toyota 2UR-GSE 5.4 L V8	96	(Japan) Morio Nitta	PA	All
(Japan) K-tunes Racing	Lexus RC F GT3	Toyota 2UR-GSE 5.4 L V8	96	(Japan) Kazunori Suenaga	PA	All
(Japan) K-tunes Racing	Ferrari 296 GT3	Ferrari F163CE 3.0 L Turbo V6	98	(Japan) Shinichi Takagi	PA	All
(Japan) K-tunes Racing	Ferrari 296 GT3	Ferrari F163CE 3.0 L Turbo V6	98	(Japan) Daisuke Yamawaki	PA	All
(Japan) RunUp Sports	Nissan GT-R Nismo GT3	Nissan VR38DETT 3.8 L Turbo V6	360	(Japan) Masaaki Nishikawa	Am	All
(Japan) RunUp Sports	Nissan GT-R Nismo GT3	Nissan VR38DETT 3.8 L Turbo V6	360	(Japan) Atsushi Tanaka	Am	All
(Japan) Maezawa Racing	Ferrari 488 GT3 Evo 2020	Ferrari F154CB 3.9 L Turbo V8	555	(Japan) Yusaku Maezawa	PA	4
(Japan) Maezawa Racing	Ferrari 488 GT3 Evo 2020	Ferrari F154CB 3.9 L Turbo V8	555	(Japan) Naoki Yokomizo	PA	4
(Japan) ANR with VSR	Lamborghini Huracán GT3 Evo 2	Lamborghini DGF 5.2 L V10	563	(Japan) Akira Mizutani	PA	1
(Japan) ANR with VSR	Lamborghini Huracán GT3 Evo 2	Lamborghini DGF 5.2 L V10	563	(Japan) Yuki Nemoto	PA	1
(Japan) Seven x Seven With KFM	Porsche 911 GT3 R (992)	Porsche M97/80 4.2 L Flat-6	666	(Japan) "Bankcy"	PA	4
(Japan) Seven x Seven With KFM	Porsche 911 GT3 R (992)	Porsche M97/80 4.2 L Flat-6	666	(Japan) Kiyoto Fujinami	PA	4
GTC
(Japan) ABSSA Motorsport	Ferrari 488 Challenge	Ferrari F154 3.9 L V8	16	(Japan) Masataka Inoue	PA	3
(Japan) ABSSA Motorsport	Ferrari 488 Challenge	Ferrari F154 3.9 L V8	16	(Japan) Kiwamu Katayama	PA	3
(Japan) ABSSA Motorsport	Porsche 991 GT3 II Cup	Porsche 4.0 L Flat-6	16	(Japan) Satoshi Konno	PA	4
(Japan) ABSSA Motorsport	Porsche 991 GT3 II Cup	Porsche 4.0 L Flat-6	16	(Japan) Keita Sawa	PA	4
(Japan) GAMA 83 Racing	Porsche 991 GT3 II Cup	Porsche 4.0 L Flat-6	83	(Japan) Makoto Haga	Am	2–4
(Japan) GAMA 83 Racing	Porsche 991 GT3 II Cup	Porsche 4.0 L Flat-6	83	(Japan) Mineki Okura	Am	4
GT4
(Japan) ABSSA Motorsport	Mercedes-AMG GT4	Mercedes-AMG M178 4.0 L Turbo V8	16	(Japan) Takashi Toyoda	Am	1–2
(Japan) ABSSA Motorsport	Mercedes-AMG GT4	Mercedes-AMG M178 4.0 L Turbo V8	16	(Japan) Kiwamu Katayama	Am	1
(Japan) ABSSA Motorsport	Mercedes-AMG GT4	Mercedes-AMG M178 4.0 L Turbo V8	16	(Japan) Yasuto Fukui	Am	2
(Japan) Wakayama Toyota with Hojust Racing	Toyota GR Supra GT4	BMW B58B30 3.0 L Turbo I6	38	(Japan) Takeshi Suehiro	SA	All
(Japan) Wakayama Toyota with Hojust Racing	Toyota GR Supra GT4	BMW B58B30 3.0 L Turbo I6	38	(Japan) Toshiyuki Ochiai	SA	1, 3–4
(Japan) Wakayama Toyota with Hojust Racing	Toyota GR Supra GT4	BMW B58B30 3.0 L Turbo I6	38	(Japan) Noriyuki Higuchi	SA	2
Toyota Gazoo Racing Indonesia	Toyota GR Supra GT4	BMW B58B30 3.0 L Turbo I6	39	(Indonesia) Haridarma Manoppo	SA	All
Toyota Gazoo Racing Indonesia	Toyota GR Supra GT4	BMW B58B30 3.0 L Turbo I6	39	(Japan) Seita Nonaka	SA	1, 3–4
Toyota Gazoo Racing Indonesia	Toyota GR Supra GT4	BMW B58B30 3.0 L Turbo I6	39	(Japan) Kazuhisa Urabe	SA	2
(Japan) D'station Racing	Aston Martin Vantage AMR GT4	Aston Martin M177 4.0 L Turbo V8	47	(Japan) Kenji Hama	Am	3–4
(Japan) D'station Racing	Aston Martin Vantage AMR GT4	Aston Martin M177 4.0 L Turbo V8	47	(Japan) Tatsuya Hoshino	Am	3–4
(Japan) YZ Racing	BMW M4 GT4 Gen II	BMW S58B30T0 3.0 L Turbo I6	50	(Japan) Yuki Fujii	SA	All
(Japan) YZ Racing	BMW M4 GT4 Gen II	BMW S58B30T0 3.0 L Turbo I6	50	(Japan) Masaki Kano	SA	All
(Japan) JBR	McLaren 570S GT4	McLaren M838TE 3.8 L Turbo V8	64	(Japan) Yasutaka Ando	Am	2
(Japan) JBR	McLaren 570S GT4	McLaren M838TE 3.8 L Turbo V8	64	(Japan) Osamu Kondo	Am	2
(Japan) JBR	McLaren 570S GT4	McLaren M838TE 3.8 L Turbo V8	64	(Japan) "Hiro"	Am	3
(Japan) JBR	McLaren 570S GT4	McLaren M838TE 3.8 L Turbo V8	64	(Japan) Miou Katayama	Am	3
(Japan) Sunrise BLVD	Porsche 718 Cayman GT4 RS Clubsport	Porsche MDG.GA 4.0 L Flat-6	82	(Japan) Daiki Fujiwara	SA	All
(Japan) Sunrise BLVD	Porsche 718 Cayman GT4 RS Clubsport	Porsche MDG.GA 4.0 L Flat-6	82	(Japan) Yoshimoto Makino	SA	All
(Japan) K-tunes Racing	Toyota GR Supra GT4	BMW B58B30 3.0 L Turbo I6	97	(Japan) Yoshichika Nagai	SA	All
(Japan) K-tunes Racing	Toyota GR Supra GT4	BMW B58B30 3.0 L Turbo I6	97	(Japan) Masahiko Kageyama	SA	1–3
(Japan) K-tunes Racing	Toyota GR Supra GT4	BMW B58B30 3.0 L Turbo I6	97	(Japan) Ryohei Sakaguchi	SA	4

Icon	Class
Drivers
PA	Pro-Am Cup
SA	Silver-Am Cup
Am	Am Cup

- Buzz Racing was scheduled to compete in the series with "Ken Alex" and Lin Chenghua, but did not enter any rounds.

== Race results ==
Bold indicates overall winner for each car class (GT3 and GT4).

GT3 & GTC

Round		Circuit	Pole position	GT3 Pro/Am Winners	GT3 Am Winners	GTC Winner
1	R1	Sugo	(Japan) No. 98 K-tunes Racing	**(Japan) No. 9 Bingo Racing**	(Japan) No. 55 Team MACCHINA	No Entries
1	R1	Sugo	(Japan) Shinichi Takagi (Japan) Daisuke Yamawaki	**(Japan) Ukyo Sasahara** **(Japan) Shinji Takei**	(Japan) Tadao Uematsu	No Entries
1	R2	Sugo	(Japan) No. 98 K-tunes Racing	**(Japan) No. 9 Bingo Racing**	(Japan) No. 55 Team MACCHINA	No Entries
1	R2	Sugo	(Japan) Shinichi Takagi (Japan) Daisuke Yamawaki	**(Japan) Ukyo Sasahara** **(Japan) Shinji Takei**	(Japan) Tadao Uematsu	No Entries
2	R1	Fuji	(Japan) No. 98 K-tunes Racing	**(Japan) No. 98 K-tunes Racing**	(Japan) No. 55 Team MACCHINA	(Japan) No. 83 GAMA 83 Racing
2	R1	Fuji	(Japan) Shinichi Takagi (Japan) Daisuke Yamawaki	**(Japan) Shinichi Takagi** **(Japan) Daisuke Yamawaki**	(Japan) Tadao Uematsu	(Japan) Makoto Haga
2	R2	Fuji	(Japan) No. 98 K-tunes Racing	**(Japan) No. 98 K-tunes Racing**	(Japan) No. 55 Team MACCHINA	(Japan) No. 83 GAMA 83 Racing
2	R2	Fuji	(Japan) Shinichi Takagi (Japan) Daisuke Yamawaki	**(Japan) Shinichi Takagi** **(Japan) Daisuke Yamawaki**	(Japan) Tadao Uematsu	(Japan) Makoto Haga
3	R1	Suzuka	(Japan) No. 9 Bingo Racing	**(Japan) No. 96 K-tunes Racing**	(Japan) No. 7 Comet Racing	(Japan) No. 16 ABSSA Motorsport
3	R1	Suzuka	(Japan) "Motoki" (Japan) Shinji Takei	**(Japan) Morio Nitta** **(Japan) Kazunori Suenaga**	(Japan) Yorikatsu Tsujiko (Japan) Yusuke Yamasaki	(Japan) Masataka Inoue (Japan) Kiwamu Katayama
3	R2	Suzuka	(Japan) No. 98 K-tunes Racing	**(Japan) No. 98 K-tunes Racing**	(Japan) No. 7 Comet Racing	(Japan) No. 16 ABSSA Motorsport
3	R2	Suzuka	(Japan) Shinichi Takagi (Japan) Daisuke Yamawaki	**(Japan) Shinichi Takagi** **(Japan) Daisuke Yamawaki**	(Japan) Yorikatsu Tsujiko (Japan) Yusuke Yamasaki	(Japan) Masataka Inoue (Japan) Kiwamu Katayama
4	R1	Okayama	(Japan) No. 666 Seven x Seven With KFM	**(Japan) No. 666 Seven x Seven With KFM**	(Japan) No. 9 Bingo Racing	(Japan) No. 83 GAMA 83 Racing
4	R1	Okayama	(Japan) "Bankcy" (Japan) Kiyoto Fujinami	**(Japan) "Bankcy"** **(Japan) Kiyoto Fujinami**	(Japan) "Motoki" (Japan) Shinji Takei	(Japan) Makoto Haga (Japan) Mineki Okura
4	R2	Okayama	(Japan) No. 98 K-tunes Racing	**(Japan) No. 98 K-tunes Racing**	(Japan) No. 9 Bingo Racing	(Japan) No. 83 GAMA 83 Racing
4	R2	Okayama	(Japan) Shinichi Takagi (Japan) Daisuke Yamawaki	**(Japan) Shinichi Takagi** **(Japan) Daisuke Yamawaki**	(Japan) "Motoki" (Japan) Shinji Takei	(Japan) Makoto Haga (Japan) Mineki Okura

GT4

Round		Circuit	GT4 Pole Position	GT4 Silver-Am winner	GT4 Am winner
1	R1	Sugo	No. 39 Toyota Gazoo Racing Indonesia	**(Japan) No. 50 YZ Racing**	(Japan) No. 16 ABSSA Motorsport
1	R1	Sugo	(Indonesia) Haridarma Manoppo (Japan) Seita Nonaka	**(Japan) Yuki Fujii** **(Japan) Masaki Kano**	(Japan) Kiwamu Katayama (Japan) Takashi Toyoda
1	R2	Sugo	No. 39 Toyota Gazoo Racing Indonesia	**No. 39 Toyota Gazoo Racing Indonesia**	(Japan) No. 16 ABSSA Motorsport
1	R2	Sugo	(Indonesia) Haridarma Manoppo (Japan) Seita Nonaka	**(Indonesia) Haridarma Manoppo** **(Japan) Seita Nonaka**	(Japan) Kiwamu Katayama (Japan) Takashi Toyoda
2	R1	Fuji	(Japan) No. 38 Wakayama Toyota with Hojust Racing	**No. 39 Toyota Gazoo Racing Indonesia**	(Japan) No. 64 JBR
2	R1	Fuji	(Japan) Noriyuki Higuchi (Japan) Takeshi Suehiro	**(Indonesia) Haridarma Manoppo** **(Japan) Kazuhisa Urabe**	(Japan) Yasutaka Ando (Japan) Osamu Kondo
2	R2	Fuji	(Japan) No. 38 Wakayama Toyota with Hojust Racing	**(Japan) No. 82 Sunrise BLVD**	(Japan) No. 64 JBR
2	R2	Fuji	(Japan) Noriyuki Higuchi (Japan) Takeshi Suehiro	**(Japan) Daiki Fujiwara** **(Japan) Yoshimoto Makino**	(Japan) Yasutaka Ando (Japan) Osamu Kondo
3	R1	Suzuka	(Japan) No. 50 YZ Racing	**(Japan) No. 38 Wakayama Toyota with Hojust Racing**	(Japan) No. 47 D'station Racing
3	R1	Suzuka	(Japan) Yuki Fujii (Japan) Masaki Kano	**(Japan) Toshiyuki Ochiai** **(Japan) Takeshi Suehiro**	(Japan) Kenji Hama (Japan) Tatsuya Hoshino
3	R2	Suzuka	(Japan) No. 38 Wakayama Toyota with Hojust Racing	**(Japan) No. 38 Wakayama Toyota with Hojust Racing**	(Japan) No. 47 D'station Racing
3	R2	Suzuka	(Japan) Toshiyuki Ochiai (Japan) Takeshi Suehiro	**(Japan) Toshiyuki Ochiai** **(Japan) Takeshi Suehiro**	(Japan) Kenji Hama (Japan) Tatsuya Hoshino
4	R1	Okayama	No. 39 Toyota Gazoo Racing Indonesia	**(Japan) No. 50 YZ Racing**	(Japan) No. 47 D'station Racing
4	R1	Okayama	(Indonesia) Haridarma Manoppo (Japan) Seita Nonaka	**(Japan) Yuki Fujii** **(Japan) Masaki Kano**	(Japan) Kenji Hama (Japan) Tatsuya Hoshino
4	R2	Okayama	No. 39 Toyota Gazoo Racing Indonesia	**(Japan) No. 38 Wakayama Toyota with Hojust Racing**	(Japan) No. 47 D'station Racing
4	R2	Okayama	(Indonesia) Haridarma Manoppo (Japan) Seita Nonaka	**(Japan) Toshiyuki Ochiai** **(Japan) Takeshi Suehiro**	(Japan) Kenji Hama (Japan) Tatsuya Hoshino

== Championship standings ==
Scoring system

Championship points are awarded for the first ten positions in each race. Entries are required to complete 75% of the winning car's race distance in order to be classified and earn points. Individual drivers are required to participate for a minimum of 25 minutes in order to earn championship points in any race.

Position	**1st**	**2nd**	**3rd**	**4th**	**5th**	**6th**	**7th**	**8th**	**9th**	**10th**
Points	25	18	15	12	10	8	6	4	2	1

=== Drivers' championships ===
Pos.	Driver	Team	SUG (Japan)		FUJ (Japan)		SUZ (Japan)		OKA (Japan)		Points
GT3
1	(Japan) Shinichi Takagi (Japan) Daisuke Yamawaki	(Japan) No. 98 K-tunes Racing	**2**	**2**	**1**	**1**	2	**1**	2	**1**	169
2	(Japan) Shinji Takei	(Japan) No. 9 Bingo Racing	1	1	4	5	Ret	DSQ	3	3	108
3	(Japan) Tadao Uematsu	(Japan) No. 55 Team MACCHINA	4	3	3	2	4	4	5	8	107
4	(Japan) Yorikatsu Tsujiko (Japan) Yusuke Yamasaki	(Japan) No. 7 Comet Racing	6	4	5	3	3	3	7	4	100
5	(Japan) Morio Nitta (Japan) Kazunori Suenaga	(Japan) No. 96 K-tunes Racing	5	5	2	4	1	2	WD	WD	93
6	(Japan) Atsushi Tanaka	(Japan) No. 360 RunUp Sports	8	6	8	6	5	5	8	7	62
7	(Japan) "Motoki"	(Japan) No. 9 Bingo Racing			4	5	Ret	DSQ	3	3	58
8	(Japan) Masaaki Nishikawa	(Japan) No. 360 RunUp Sports	8	6	8	WD	5	5	8	7	54
9	(Japan) Ukyo Sasahara	(Japan) No. 9 Bingo Racing	1	1							50
10	(Japan) Nobuyuki Oyagi (Japan) Ryuichiro Oyagi	(Japan) No. 81 Team DAISHIN with GTNET Motorsports			7	8			6	5	34
11	(Japan) Akira Mizutani (Japan) Yuki Nemoto	(Japan) No. 563 ANR With VSR	3	7							21
12	(Japan) Kenji Hama (Japan) Tatsuya Hoshino	(Japan) No. 47 D'station Racing	7	Ret	6	7					20
GTC
1	(Japan) Makoto Haga	(Japan) No. 83 GAMA 83 Racing			**13**	**13**	10	7	9	14	129
2	(Japan) Masataka Inoue (Japan) Kiwamu Katayama	(Japan) No. 16 ABSSA Motorsport					**6**	**6**			50
3	(Japan) Mineki Okura	(Japan) No. 83 GAMA 83 Racing							9	14	50
4	(Japan) Satoshi Konno (Japan) Keita Sawa	(Japan) No. 16 ABSSA Motorsport							**10**	**16**	36
GT4
1	(Japan) Takeshi Suehiro	(Japan) No. 38 Wakayama Toyota with Hojust Racing	10	9	**11**	**12**	7	**8**	13	9	153
2	(Japan) Yuki Fujii (Japan) Masaki Kano	(Japan) No. 50 YZ Racing	9	10	12	10	**8**	9	11	11	146
3	(Indonesia) Haridarma Manoppo	No. 39 Toyota Gazoo Racing Indonesia	**12**	**8**	9	11	9	10	**12**	**10**	143
4	(Japan) Toshiyuki Ochiai	(Japan) No. 38 Wakayama Toyota with Hojust Racing	10	9			7	**8**	13	9	126
5	(Japan) Daiki Fujiwara (Japan) Yoshimoto Makino	(Japan) No. 82 Sunrise BLVD	11	11	10	9	11	14	15	12	112
6	(Japan) Seita Nonaka	No. 39 Toyota Gazoo Racing Indonesia	**12**	**8**			9	10	**12**	**10**	103
7	(Japan) Yoshichika Nagai	(Japan) No. 97 K-tunes Racing	13	12	14	14	13	13	14	15	78
8	(Japan) Masahiko Kageyama	(Japan) No. 97 K-tunes Racing	13	12	14	14	13	13			56
9	(Japan) Kazuhisa Urabe	No. 39 Toyota Gazoo Racing Indonesia			9	11					40
10	(Japan) Kenji Hama (Japan) Tatsuya Hoshino	(Japan) No. 47 D'station Racing					12	11	16	13	40
11	(Japan) Takashi Toyoda	(Japan) No. 16 ABSSA Motorsport	14	13	16	16					28
12	(Japan) Noriyuki Higuchi	(Japan) No. 38 Wakayama Toyota with Hojust Racing			**11**	**12**					27
13	(Japan) Kiwamu Katayama	(Japan) No. 16 ABSSA Motorsport	14	13							16
14	(Japan) Yasutaka Ando (Japan) Osamu Kondo	(Japan) No. 64 JBR			15	15					16
15	(Japan) Ryohei Sakaguchi	(Japan) No. 16 K-tunes Racing							14	15	20
16	(Japan) Yasuto Fukui	(Japan) No. 16 ABSSA Motorsport			16	16					12
Guest drivers ineligible to score points
GT3
—	(Japan) "Bankcy" (Japan) Kiyoto Fujinami	(Japan) No. 666 Seven x Seven With KFM							**1**	6	—
—	(Japan) Yusaku Maezawa (Japan) Naoki Yokomizo	(Japan) No. 555 Maezawa Racing							4	2	—
GT4
—	(Japan) "Hiro" (Japan) Miou Katayama	(Japan) No. 64 JBR					14	11			—
Pos.	Driver	Team	SUG (Japan)		FUJ (Japan)		SUZ (Japan)		OKA (Japan)		Points

Colour	Result
Gold	Winner
Silver	Second place
Bronze	Third place
Green	Points classification
Blue	Non-points classification
Blue	Non-classified finish (NC)
Purple	Retired, not classified (Ret)
Red	Did not qualify (DNQ)
Red	Did not pre-qualify (DNPQ)
Black	Disqualified (DSQ)
White	Did not start (DNS)
White	Withdrew (WD)
White	Race cancelled (C)
Blank	Did not practice (DNP)
Blank	Did not arrive (DNA)
Blank	Excluded (EX)

**Bold** – Pole

Italics – Fastest Lap

Notes:

- † – Drivers did not finish the race, but were classified as they completed more than 90% of the race distance.

==== Pro-Am Cup ====
Pos.	Driver	Team	SUG (Japan)		FUJ (Japan)		SUZ (Japan)		OKA (Japan)		Points
GT3
1	(Japan) Shinichi Takagi (Japan) Daisuke Yamawaki	(Japan) No. 98 K-tunes Racing	**2**	**2**	**1**	**1**	2	**1**	2	**1**	154
2	(Japan) Morio Nitta (Japan) Kazunori Suenaga	(Japan) No. 96 K-tunes Racing	4	3	2	2	**1**	2	WD	WD	106
3	(Japan) Ukyo Sasahara (Japan) Shinji Takei	(Japan) No. 9 Bingo Racing	1	1							50
4	(Japan) Akira Mizutani (Japan) Yuki Nemoto	(Japan) No. 563 ANR With VSR	3	4							27
Guest drivers ineligible to score points
GT3
—	(Japan) "Bankcy" (Japan) Kiyoto Fujinami	(Japan) No. 666 Seven x Seven With KFM							**1**	3	—
—	(Japan) Yusaku Maezawa (Japan) Naoki Yokomizo	(Japan) No. 555 Maezawa Racing							3	2	—
Pos.	Driver	Team	SUG (Japan)		FUJ (Japan)		SUZ (Japan)		OKA (Japan)		Points

==== Silver-Am Cup ====
Pos.	Driver	Team	SUG (Japan)		FUJ (Japan)		SUZ (Japan)		OKA (Japan)		Points
GT4
1	(Japan) Takeshi Suehiro	(Japan) No. 38 Wakayama Toyota with Hojust Racing	2	2	**3**	**4**	1	**1**	3	1	153
2	(Japan) Yuki Fujii (Japan) Masaki Kano	(Japan) No. 50 YZ Racing	1	3	4	2	**2**	2	1	3	146
3	(Indonesia) Haridarma Manoppo	No. 39 Toyota Gazoo Racing Indonesia	**4**	**1**	1	3	3	3	**2**	**2**	143
4	(Japan) Daiki Fujiwara (Japan) Yoshimoto Makino	(Japan) No. 82 Sunrise BLVD	3	4	2	1	4	5	5	4	114
5	(Japan) Toshiyuki Ochiai	(Japan) No. 38 Wakayama Toyota with Hojust Racing	2	2			1	**1**	3	1	126
6	(Japan) Seita Nonaka	No. 39 Toyota Gazoo Racing Indonesia	**4**	**1**			3	3	**2**	**2**	103
7	(Japan) Yoshichika Nagai	(Japan) No. 97 K-tunes Racing	5	5	5	5	5	4	4	5	84
8	(Japan) Masahiko Kageyama	(Japan) No. 97 K-tunes Racing	5	5	5	5	5	4			62
9	(Japan) Kazuhisa Urabe	No. 39 Toyota Gazoo Racing Indonesia			1	3					40
10	(Japan) Noriyuki Higuchi	(Japan) No. 38 Wakayama Toyota with Hojust Racing			**3**	**4**					27
11	(Japan) Ryohei Sakaguchi	(Japan) No. 16 K-tunes Racing							4	5	22
Pos.	Driver	Team	SUG (Japan)		FUJ (Japan)		SUZ (Japan)		OKA (Japan)		Points

==== Am Cup ====
Pos.	Driver	Team	SUG (Japan)		FUJ (Japan)		SUZ (Japan)		OKA (Japan)		Points
GT3
1	(Japan) Tadao Uematsu	(Japan) No. 55 Team MACCHINA	**1**	**1**	1	1	**2**	2	**2**	5	154
2	(Japan) Yorikatsu Tsujiko (Japan) Yusuke Yamasaki	(Japan) No. 7 Comet Racing	2	2	**3**	2	1	1	4	2	149
3	(Japan) Atsushi Tanaka	(Japan) No. 360 RunUp Sports	4	3	6	4	3	3	5	4	99
4	(Japan) Masaaki Nishikawa	(Japan) No. 360 RunUp Sports	4	3	6	WD	3	3	5	4	87
5	(Japan) "Motoki" (Japan) Shinji Takei	(Japan) No. 9 Bingo Racing			2	**3**	**Ret**	DSQ	1	1	83
6	(Japan) Nobuyuki Oyagi (Japan) Ryuichiro Oyagi	(Japan) No. 81 Team DAISHIN with GTNET Motorsports			5	6			3	3	48
7	(Japan) Kenji Hama (Japan) Tatsuya Hoshino	(Japan) No. 47 D'station Racing	3	Ret	4	5					37
GT4
1	(Japan) Kenji Hama (Japan) Tatsuya Hoshino	(Japan) No. 47 D'station Racing					**1**	**1**	**1**	**1**	100
2	(Japan) Takashi Toyoda	(Japan) No. 16 ABSSA Motorsport	**1**	**1**	2	2					86
3	(Japan) Kiwamu Katayama	(Japan) No. 16 ABSSA Motorsport	**1**	**1**							50
4	(Japan) Yasutaka Ando (Japan) Osamu Kondo	(Japan) No. 64 JBR			**1**	**1**					50
5	(Japan) Yasuto Fukui	(Japan) No. 16 ABSSA Motorsport			2	2					36
Guest drivers ineligible to score points
GT4
—	(Japan) "Hiro" (Japan) Miou Katayama	(Japan) No. 64 JBR					2	2			—
Pos.	Driver	Team	SUG (Japan)		FUJ (Japan)		SUZ (Japan)		OKA (Japan)		Points

=== Teams' Championship ===
Pos.	Team	SUG (Japan)		FUJ (Japan)		SUZ (Japan)		OKA (Japan)		Points
GT3
1	(Japan) K-tunes Racing	2	2	1	1	1	1	2	1	272
1	(Japan) K-tunes Racing	5	5	2	4	2	2	WD	WD	272
2	(Japan) Team MACCHINA	4	3	3	2	4	4	5	8	115
3	(Japan) Bingo Racing	1	1	4	5	Ret	DSQ	3	3	105
4	(Japan) Comet Racing	6	4	5	3	3	3	7	4	100
5	(Japan) RunUp Sports	8	7	8	6	5	5	8	7	62
6	(Japan) Team DAISHIN with GTNET Motorsports			7	8			6	5	34
7	(Japan) ANR With VSR	3	7							21
8	(Japan) D'station Racing	7	Ret	6	7					20
GT4
1	(Japan) Wakayama Toyota with Hojust Racing	10	9	**11**	**12**	7	**8**	13	9	153
2	(Japan) YZ Racing	9	10	12	10	**8**	9	11	11	146
3	Toyota Gazoo Racing Indonesia	**12**	**8**	9	11	9	10	**12**	**10**	143
4	(Japan) Sunrise BLVD	11	11	10	9	11	14	15	12	112
5	(Japan) K-tunes Racing	13	12	14	14	13	13	14	15	78
6	(Japan) D'station Racing					12	12	16	13	38
7	(Japan) ABSSA Motorsport	14	13	16	16					28
8	(Japan) JBR			15	15					16
Guest drivers ineligible to score points
GT3
—	(Japan) Seven x Seven With KFM							1	6	—
—	(Japan) Maezawa Racing							4	2	—
GT4
—	(Japan) JBR					14	13			—
Pos.	Team	SUG (Japan)		FUJ (Japan)		SUZ (Japan)		OKA (Japan)		Points

== See also ==
- 2024 British GT Championship
- 2024 GT World Challenge Europe
- 2024 GT World Challenge Europe Endurance Cup
- 2024 GT World Challenge Europe Sprint Cup
- 2024 GT World Challenge America
- 2024 GT World Challenge Australia
- 2024 Intercontinental GT Challenge
