= Yorikatsu Tsujiko =

Japanese racing driver (born 1984)

- 辻子 依旦
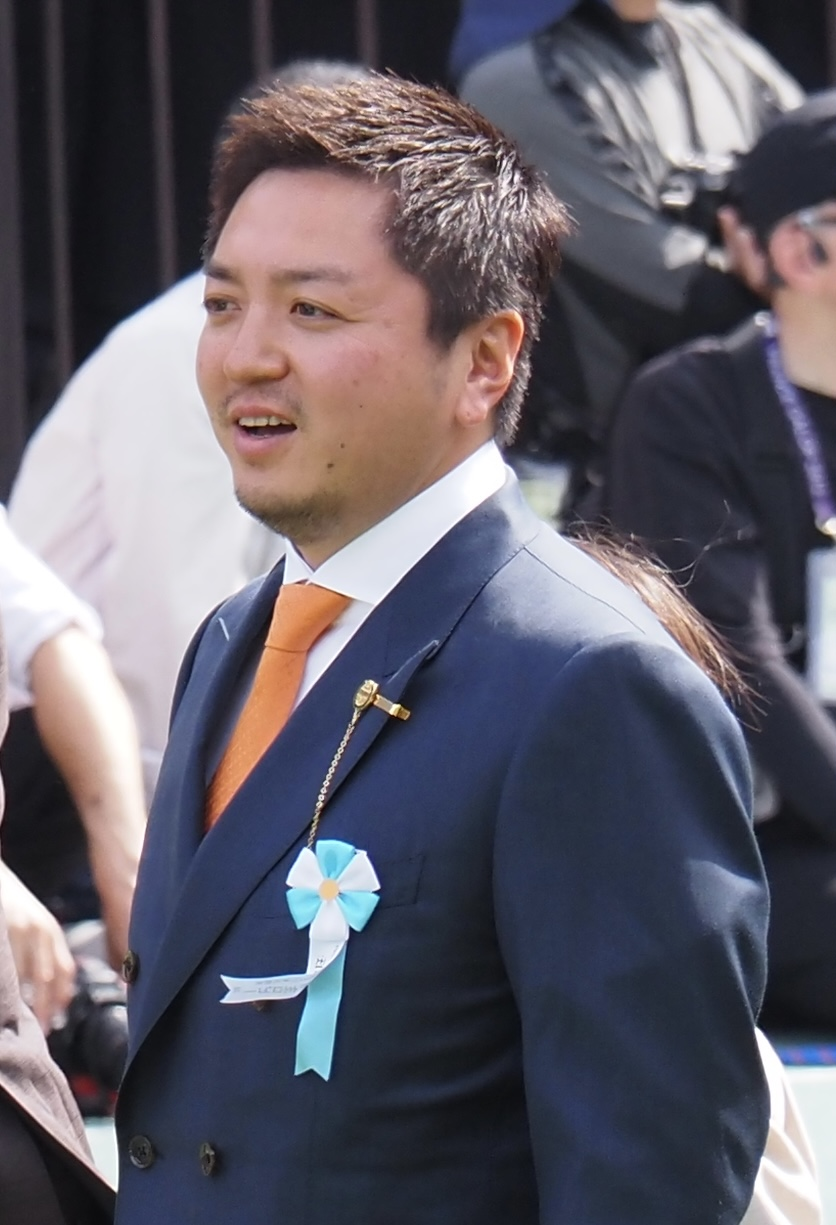
- Tsujiko in 2024
- Born: Yorikatsu Tsujiko; 7 January 1984 (age 42); Kyoto Prefecture, Japan
- Nationality: (Japan) Japanese
- Categorisation: FIA Bronze

Yorikatsu Tsujiko (辻子 依旦, Tsujiko Yorikatsu; born 7 January 1984) is a Japanese businessman and racing driver.

== Business career ==
Born in Kyoto Prefecture in 1984, Tsujiko moved to the United Kingdom after high school to study mechanical engineering, but returned to Japan a year later after his father fell ill. Following two years working in a car dealership, Tsujiko joined PONOS, which was founded by his father in 1990. One month later his father passed away, and in January 2012 Tsujiko became the company's CEO.

Under his leadership, PONOS released The Battle Cats in November of that year, and also sponsored Williams Racing and Red Bull Racing in Formula One between 2020 and 2022. In 2021, Tsujiko founded Ponos Racing in order to begin his career in motorsports as a driver.

== Racing career ==
Tsujiko made his car racing debut in 2021, racing for Ponos Racing in select rounds of the Formula Regional Japanese Championship. Racing at Okayama and Suzuka, Tsujiko scored a best result of 12th in both rounds. During 2021, Tsujiko also participated in the season-opening round of the Super Taikyu Series at Motegi with Comet Racing in the ST-Z class.

The following year, Tsujiko returned to Formula Regional Japan with Ponos Racing, whilst also entering GT World Challenge Asia with Comet Racing. In the former, Tsujiko scored a best result of seventh in race one at Okayama and finished 12th in points. In the latter, Tsujiko scored an overall win at Suzuka and five class podiums to secure third in the Am standings.

Remaining with Comet Racing for 2023, Tsujiko raced with the team in both GT World Challenge Asia and the SRO Japan Cup, whilst also returning to Ponos Racing for a part-time schedule in Formula Regional Japan. In GTWC Asia, Tsujiko scored an Am class win at Fuji and once again finished third in the class standings, whereas in Japan Cup, Tsujiko secured seventh in the overall standings with a best result of fourth in the same race. In Formula Regional Japan, Tsujiko scored a best result of fifth in race two at Fuji and ended the year 13th in points. During 2023, Tsujiko also made his 24 Hours of Le Mans debut, racing in the LMGTE Am class for Kessel Racing alongside Kei Cozzolino and Naoki Yokomizo. In the race, the trio finished ninth in class.

For 2024, Tsujiko remained with Ponos Racing to race in both the Formula Regional Japanese Championship and Porsche Carrera Cup Japan, whilst also continuing in the SRO Japan Cup with Comet Racing. In the former, Tsujiko took his maiden series podium by finishing third in race three at Okayama, whereas in Carrera Cup Japan, he scored a best result of ninth at the same venue. Racing in the Am class in Japan Cup, Tsujiko won both races at Suzuka in class and scored one more overall podium to finish runner-up in the Am standings.

In 2025, Tsujiko remained in the SRO Japan Cup as Ponos Racing entered the series and also partook in the Suzuka 1000 km with the same team. In Japan Cup, Tsujiko won at Okayama and Suzuka on his way to runner-up in both the GT3 overall and Pro-Am standings. Tsujiko remained with Ponos Racing, which ran in a collaboration with K2 R&D, to race in the 2025–26 Asian Le Mans Series for his debut in endurance prototypes, in which he competed in the LMP2 class. Following the demise of the K&2 partnership ahead of the UAE rounds, United Autosports maintained the team's cars for the final two rounds, in which Tsujiko scored his only points of the season at the finale in Abu Dhabi.

For the rest of 2026, Tsujiko remained with his team to continue in the SRO Japan Cup. Racing in the GT3 Am class alongside Yusuke Yamasaki, the pair took class wins at Fuji and Okayama to secure runner-up honours. At the end of the year, Tsujiko and Ponos Racing returned to the 2026–27 Asian Le Mans Series, this time in the GT3 class.

== Racing record ==
=== Racing career summary ===
Season	Series	Team	Races	Wins	Poles	F/Laps	Podiums	Points	Position
2021	Formula Regional Japanese Championship	PONOS Racing	6	0	0	0	0	0	21st
2021	Super Taikyu Series – ST-Z	Comet Racing	1	0	0	0	0	1‡	16th‡
2022	Formula Regional Japanese Championship	TOM'S Formula	9	0	0	0	0	23	12th
2022	GT World Challenge Asia – Am	Comet Racing	8	1	0	0	6	130	**3rd**
2023	Formula Regional Japanese Championship	PONOS Racing	5	0	0	0	0	34	13th
2023	GT World Challenge Asia – Am	Comet Racing	8	1	0	0	7	130	**3rd**
2023	SRO Japan Cup – GT3	Comet Racing	8	0	0	0	0	45	7th
2023	24 Hours of Le Mans – LMGTE Am	Kessel Racing	1	0	0	0	0	—N/a	38th
2024	Formula Regional Japanese Championship	PONOS Racing	9	0	0	0	1	39	11th
2024	Porsche Carrera Cup Japan – Am	PONOS Racing	11	0	0	0	3	79	6th
2024	SRO Japan Cup – GT3 Am	Comet Racing	8	2	1	0	7	149	**2nd**
2025	SRO Japan Cup – GT3 Pro-Am	Ponos Racing	8	2	1	0	5	108	**2nd**
2025	Intercontinental GT Challenge	Ponos Racing	1	0	0	0	0	0	NC
2025–26	Asian Le Mans Series – LMP2	PONOS Racing	5	0	0	0	0	2	18th
2026	SRO Japan Cup – GT3 Am	Ponos Racing	8	2	2	0	8	158	**2nd**
2026–27	Asian Le Mans Series – GT3	Ponos Racing						*	*

^{‡} Team standings

=== Complete Formula Regional Japanese Championship results ===
(key) (Races in bold indicate pole position) (Races in italics indicate fastest lap)

Year	Entrant	1	2	3	4	5	6	7	8	9	10	11	12	13	14	15	16	17	Pos	Points
2021	PONOS Racing	OKA; 1; 13	OKA; 2; 12	OKA; 3; 13	MOT; 1	MOT; 2	MOT; 3	FUJ; 1; 14	FUJ; 2; 14	FUJ; 3; 12	SUG; 1	SUG; 2	SUZ; 1	SUZ; 2					21st	0
2022	PONOS Racing	FUJ1; 1; 9	FUJ1; 2; 9†	FUJ1; 3; 9	OKA; 1; 7	OKA; 2 Ret	OKA; 3; 8	MOT; 1	MOT; 2	MOT; 3	SUG; 1	SUG; 2	SUG; 3	FUJ2; 1; 10	FUJ2; 2; 9	FUJ2; 3; 8	SUZ; 1	SUZ; 2	12th	23
2023	PONOS Racing	FUJ1; 1; 6	FUJ1; 2; 5	FUJ1; 3; 7	SUZ; 1	SUZ; 2	OKA; 1	OKA; 2	OKA; 3	MOT; 1	MOT; 2	MOT; 3	FUJ2; 1; 6	FUJ2; 2; 9	SUG; 1	SUG; 2	SUG; 3		13th	34
2024	PONOS Racing	SUZ; 1; 7	SUZ; 2; 9	SUZ; 3; 7	SUG; 1	SUG; 2	OKA; 1 Ret	OKA; 2; 5	OKA; 3; 3	MOT; 1	MOT; 2	FUJ1; 1 Ret	FUJ1; 2 DNS	FUJ2; 1; 12	FUJ2; 2; 11				11th	39

=== Complete GT World Challenge Asia results ===
(key) (Races in bold indicate pole position) (Races in italics indicate fastest lap)

Year	Team	Car	Class	1	2	3	4	5	6	7	8	9	10	11	12	DC	Points
2022	Comet Racing	Honda NSX GT3 Evo22	Am	SEP; 1	SEP; 2	SUZ; 1; 14	SUZ; 2; 1	FUJ; 1; 13	FUJ; 2; 13	SUG; 1; 14	SUG; 2; 8	OKA; 1; 12	OKA; 2; 11			3rd	130
2023	Comet Racing	Ferrari 488 GT3 Evo 2020	Am	BUR; 1	BUR; 2	FSW; 1; 3	FSW; 2; 1	SUZ; 1; 3	SUZ; 2; 2	MOT; 1; 4	MOT; 2; 3	OKA; 1; 3	OKA; 2; 3	SEP; 1	SEP; 2	3rd	130

=== 24 Hours of Le Mans results ===
Year	Team	Co-Drivers	Car	Class	Laps	Pos.	Class Pos.
2023	(Switzerland) Kessel Racing	(Japan) Kei Cozzolino (Japan) Naoki Yokomizo	Ferrari 488 GTE Evo	GTE; Am	303	38th	9th

=== Complete Asian Le Mans Series results ===
(key) (Races in bold indicate pole position) (Races in italics indicate fastest lap)

Year	Team	Class	Car	Engine	1	2	3	4	5	6	Pos.	Points
2025–26	PONOS Racing	LMP2	Oreca 07	Gibson GK428 4.2 L V8	SEP; 1; 15	SEP; 2 WD	DUB; 1; 12	DUB; 2; 11	ABU; 1; 12	ABU; 2; 9	18th	2
