= Ponos Racing =

Japanese racing team

PONOS Racing
- Founded: 2021
- Base: Oyama, Shizuoka Prefecture
- Team principal(s): Koichi Ogawara
- Founder(s): Yorikatsu Tsujiko
- Current series: Super GT; F4 Japanese Championship; Formula Regional Japanese Championship; SRO Japan Cup
- Current drivers: Super GT - GT300: Kei Cozzolino; Takuro Shinohara; SRO Japan Cup; Kei Cozzolino; Yorikatsu Tsujiko; Formula Regional Japanese Championship: Kento Omiya; F4 Japanese Championship: Ryota Horachi; Ryuma Sako
- Website: www.ponos-racing.jp

PONOS Racing is a Japanese racing team founded and owned by PONOS owner Yorikatsu Tsujiko. The team competes in the GT300 class of Super GT as well as in F4 Japanese Championship, and Formula Regional Japanese Championship. The team's workshop is located in Oyama, across from D'station Racing and close to Fuji Speedway.

== History ==
Yorikatsu Tsujiko who owns gaming company PONOS created the team in the early 2020s. He also has sponsored other teams, such as Williams Racing in Formula One, and Rookie Racing in Super Formula.

=== Formula Regional Japanese Championship ===
The team made its debut in 2021 in the Formula Regional Japanese Championship with the help of TOM'S. Tsujiko raced in the first and third rounds, while Riki Okusa did the rest. Okusa won on debut at Fuji from pole, and then repeated the same feat in the third race of the same round. Ponos Racing promoted their driver, Kento Omiya to race in 2025.

=== F4 Japanese Championship ===
The team made its F4 Japanese Championship debut in 2023, with Kento Omiya as its driver. Omiya returned for 2024 and he was paired up with Rintaro Sato. Both drivers took podiums and finished 8th and 9th in the standings. 2024 F4 Japan runner-up Ryota Horachi and Ryuma Sako joins the team for 2025 season.

=== Super GT – GT300 ===
The team started its collaboration with GAINER in the 2023 season as a sponsorship deal. Hironobu Yasuda, and his teammate Riki Okusa drove the Nissan GTR in that season.

The former number 10 GAINER Nissan GT-R NISMO GT3 was replaced by the number 45 Ferrari 296 GT3 entered by PONOS Racing, making its Super GT debut in 2024 entering the new Ferrari 296 GT3 with Michelin tyres. The team continued their partnership with GAINER for the first couple of rounds. Kei Cozzolino returned to the series for the first time since 2022, while Ferrari GT factory driver Lilou Wadoux made her series debut. The team got their first podium in the wet SUGO race. As the season drew on, the team gradually started to run by themselves from their new base near Fuji Speedway. The team retains their river line up, with Dunlop come as the tire supplier, to replace Michelin.

=== SRO Japan Cup ===
Ponos Racing participate in SRO Japan Cup in 2025 with Cozzolino, and team owner Yorikatsu Tsujiko. They also to compete in Suzuka 1000Km with Yusuke Yamasaki.

=== Asian Le Mans LMP2 ===
Ponos Racing will make their LMP2 prototype debut, where they would work together with K2 R&D for 2025–26 Asian Le Mans Series season. They will field Yorikatsu Tsujiko, Kei Cozzolino, and Marino Sato.

== Racing record ==
=== 24 Hours of Le Mans results ===
Year	Entrant	No.	Car	Drivers	Class	Laps	Pos.	Class Pos.
2023	(Switzerland) Kessel Racing	74	Ferrari 488 GTE Evo	(Japan) Kei Cozzolino (Japan) Yorikatsu Tsujiko (Japan) Naoki Yokomizo	LMGTE Am	303	38th	9th

=== Super GT results ===
(key) (Races in bold indicate pole position) (Races in italics indicate fastest lap)

Year	Drivers	Car	Class	1	2	3	4	5	6	7	8	9	TC	Points
2023	(Japan) Hironobu Yasuda (Japan) Riki Okusa	Nissan GT-R Nismo GT3	GT300	OKA; 11	FUJ; 5	SUZ; 8	FUJ; 7	SUZ; 13	SUG; 9	AUT; 10	MOT; 16		17th	16
2024	(Japan) Kei Cozzolino (France) Lilou Wadoux	Ferrari 296 GT3	GT300	OKA; 11	FUJ; 9	SUZ; 6	FUJ; 11	SUG; 2	AUT; 24	MOT; 15	SUZ; 21		11th	44
2025	(Japan) Kei Cozzolino (Japan) Takuro Shinohara	Ferrari 296 GT3	GT300	OKA; 12	FUJ; 6	SEP; 14	FS1; 13	FS2; 9	SUZ; 4	SUG; 21	AUT; 16	MOT; 21	14th	56
2026	(Japan) Kei Cozzolino (Japan) Shintaro Kawabata (Japan) Takuro Shinohara	Ferrari 296 GT3 Evo	GT300	OKA; 20	FUJ; Ret	FUJ; 4	SUZ; 5	SUG; 11	AUT	MOT	MOT		17th*	30*

^{*} Season still in progress.
