= 2025 SRO Japan Cup =

Motor racing competition season

The 2025 SRO Japan Cup was the fourth season of the SRO Japan Cup, an auto racing series for grand tourer cars in Japan, co-promoted by the SRO Motorsports Group and Team Asia One GT Management. The races are contested with GT3-spec, GTC-spec and GT4-spec cars with hopes of GT2-spec entries. The season began on 13 June at the Sportsland SUGO in Miyagi and is scheduled to end on 14 September Suzuka International Circuit in Okayama.

== Calendar ==
Round	Circuit	Date
1	(Miyagi Prefecture) Sportsland SUGO, Murata, Miyagi	13–15 June
2	(Shizuoka Prefecture) Fuji Speedway, Oyama, Shizuoka	11–13 July
3	(Okayama Prefecture) Okayama International Circuit, Mimasaka, Okayama	29–31 August
4	(Mie Prefecture) Suzuka International Racing Course, Suzuka, Mie	12–14 September

== Entry list ==
Team	Car	Engine	No.	Drivers	Class	Rounds
GT3
(Japan) Team Macchina	Ferrari 296 GT3	Ferrari F163CE 3.0 L Turbo V6	1	(Japan) Hirokazu Suzuki	Am	All
(Japan) Team Macchina	Ferrari 296 GT3	Ferrari F163CE 3.0 L Turbo V6	1	(Japan) Tadao Uematsu	Am	All
(Japan) Bingo Racing with LM corsa	Ferrari 296 GT3	Ferrari F163CE 3.0 L Turbo V6	9	(Japan) Ukyo Sasahara	PA	All
(Japan) Bingo Racing with LM corsa	Ferrari 296 GT3	Ferrari F163CE 3.0 L Turbo V6	9	(Japan) Shinji Takei	PA	All
(Japan) Team UpGarage with ACR	Ferrari 296 GT3	Ferrari F163CE 3.0 L Turbo V6	18	(Japan) "Akita"	PA	All
(Japan) Team UpGarage with ACR	Ferrari 296 GT3	Ferrari F163CE 3.0 L Turbo V6	18	(Japan) Takashi Kobayashi	PA	All
(Japan) Max Racing	Mercedes-AMG GT3 Evo	Mercedes-AMG M159 6.2 L V8	24	(Japan) Yuya Motojima	PA	All
(Japan) Max Racing	Mercedes-AMG GT3 Evo	Mercedes-AMG M159 6.2 L V8	24	(Japan) Yudai Uchida	PA	All
(Japan) Ponos Racing	Ferrari 296 GT3	Ferrari F163CE 3.0 L Turbo V6	45	(Japan) Kei Cozzolino	PA	All
(Japan) Ponos Racing	Ferrari 296 GT3	Ferrari F163CE 3.0 L Turbo V6	45	(Japan) Yorikatsu Tsujiko	PA	All
(Japan) CarGuy Racing	Ferrari 488 GT3 Evo 2020	Ferrari F154CB 3.9 L Turbo V8	66	(Japan) Kazuki Ota	Am	All
(Japan) CarGuy Racing	Ferrari 488 GT3 Evo 2020	Ferrari F154CB 3.9 L Turbo V8	66	(Japan) Takashi Toyoda	Am	All
(Japan) Akiland Racing	Mercedes-AMG GT3 Evo	Mercedes-AMG M159 6.2 L V8	71	(Japan) Masayoshi Oyama	Am	1, 4
(Japan) Akiland Racing	Mercedes-AMG GT3 Evo	Mercedes-AMG M159 6.2 L V8	71	(Japan) Masayuki Ueda	Am	1, 4
(Japan) Team Daishin with GTNET	Nissan GT-R Nismo GT3	Nissan VR38DETT 3.8 L Turbo V6	81	(Japan) Ryuichiro Oyagi	Am	2–4
(Japan) Team Daishin with GTNET	Nissan GT-R Nismo GT3	Nissan VR38DETT 3.8 L Turbo V6	81	(Japan) Nobuyuki Oyagi	Am	3
(Japan) Galah Racing With GTNET	Nissan GT-R Nismo GT3	Nissan VR38DETT 3.8 L Turbo V6	935	(Japan) "Galah"	PA	2
(Japan) Galah Racing With GTNET	Nissan GT-R Nismo GT3	Nissan VR38DETT 3.8 L Turbo V6	935	(Japan) Natsu Sakaguchi	PA	2
(Japan) Art Taste with JMS Racing	Nissan GT-R Nismo GT3	Nissan VR38DETT 3.8 L Turbo V6	84	(Japan) Nobuhiro Imada	Am	2
(Japan) Art Taste with JMS Racing	Nissan GT-R Nismo GT3	Nissan VR38DETT 3.8 L Turbo V6	84	(Japan) Yasuhiro Shimizu	Am	2
(Japan) K-tunes Racing	Lexus RC F GT3	Toyota 2UR-GSE 5.4 L V8	96	(Japan) Nirei Fukuzumi	PA	All
(Japan) K-tunes Racing	Lexus RC F GT3	Toyota 2UR-GSE 5.4 L V8	96	(Japan) Kazunori Suenaga	PA	All
(Japan) K-tunes Racing	Ferrari 296 GT3	Ferrari F163CE 3.0 L Turbo V6	98	(Japan) Shinichi Takagi	PA	1–3
(Japan) K-tunes Racing	Ferrari 296 GT3	Ferrari F163CE 3.0 L Turbo V6	98	(Japan) Daisuke Yamawaki	PA	1–3
(Japan) Norik Racing	Ferrari 296 GT3	Ferrari F163CE 3.0 L Turbo V6	181	(Japan) Taku Bamba	PA	3–4
(Japan) Norik Racing	Ferrari 296 GT3	Ferrari F163CE 3.0 L Turbo V6	181	(Japan) Norikazu Shibata	PA	3–4
(Japan) Hitotsuyama with Cornes Racing	Ferrari 296 GT3	Ferrari F163CE 3.0 L Turbo V6	296	(Japan) Shintaro Kawabata	PA	All
(Japan) Hitotsuyama with Cornes Racing	Ferrari 296 GT3	Ferrari F163CE 3.0 L Turbo V6	296	(Japan) Akihiro Tsuzuki	PA	All
(Japan) RunUp Sports	Nissan GT-R Nismo GT3	Nissan VR38DETT 3.8 L Turbo V6	360	(Japan) Masaaki Nishikawa	Am	All
(Japan) RunUp Sports	Nissan GT-R Nismo GT3	Nissan VR38DETT 3.8 L Turbo V6	360	(Japan) Atsushi Tanaka	Am	All
(Japan) Maezawa Racing	Ferrari 296 GT3	Ferrari F163CE 3.0 L Turbo V6	555	(Japan) Yusaku Maezawa	PA	All
(Japan) Maezawa Racing	Ferrari 296 GT3	Ferrari F163CE 3.0 L Turbo V6	555	(Japan) Naoki Yokomizo	PA	All
(Japan) Seven x Seven Racing	Porsche 911 GT3 R (992)	Porsche M97/80 4.2 L Flat-6	666	(Japan) "Bankcy"	PA	All
(Japan) Seven x Seven Racing	Porsche 911 GT3 R (992)	Porsche M97/80 4.2 L Flat-6	666	(Japan) Kiyoto Fujinami	PA	1
(Japan) Seven x Seven Racing	Porsche 911 GT3 R (992)	Porsche M97/80 4.2 L Flat-6	666	(Japan) Taichi Watarai	PA	2–4
GTC
(Japan) NGR	Porsche 992 GT3 Cup	Porsche M97/80 4.0 L Flat-6	16	(Japan) "Hiro"	Am	2
(Japan) Hipoint Racing	Porsche 991 GT3 II Cup	Porsche M97/80 4.0 L Flat-6	17	(Japan) Tomohisa Furuya	Am	1–2
(Japan) Hipoint Racing	Porsche 991 GT3 II Cup	Porsche M97/80 4.0 L Flat-6	17	(Japan) Satoshi Konno	Am	1–2
(Japan) AWD Racing	Porsche 992 GT3 Cup	Porsche M97/80 4.0 L Flat-6	27	(Australia) Jake Parsons	PA	2
(Japan) AWD Racing	Porsche 992 GT3 Cup	Porsche M97/80 4.0 L Flat-6	27	(Canada) Jesse Anthony Swinimer	PA	2
(Japan) Gama83 Racing	Porsche 991 GT3 II Cup	Porsche M97/80 4.0 L Flat-6	83	(Japan) Makoto Haga	PA	2
(Japan) Gama83 Racing	Porsche 991 GT3 II Cup	Porsche M97/80 4.0 L Flat-6	83	(Japan) Mineki Okura	PA	2
(Japan) Caratt Racing	Porsche 991 GT3 II Cup	Porsche M97/80 4.0 L Flat-6	94	(Japan) Takashi Sano	PA	2
(Japan) Caratt Racing	Porsche 991 GT3 II Cup	Porsche M97/80 4.0 L Flat-6	94	(Japan) Takuya Shirasaka	PA	2
(Japan) Bingo Racing	Porsche 992 GT3 Cup	Porsche M97/80 4.0 L Flat-6	888	(Chinese Taipei) Tiger Wu Chi-hsuan	Am	All
GT4
(Japan) TTR with Akiland Racing	Toyota GR Supra GT4 Evo2	BMW B58B30 3.0 L Turbo I6	11	(Hong Kong) Tony Fong Wai Shing	Am	4
(Japan) TTR with Akiland Racing	Toyota GR Supra GT4 Evo2	BMW B58B30 3.0 L Turbo I6	11	(Hong Kong) Terence Tse Kin Leung	Am	4
(Japan) Destino with Sunrise BLVD	Porsche 718 Cayman GT4 RS Clubsport	Porsche MDG.GA 4.0 L Flat-6	15	(Japan) Kohei Azuma	Am	2, 4
(Japan) Destino with Sunrise BLVD	Porsche 718 Cayman GT4 RS Clubsport	Porsche MDG.GA 4.0 L Flat-6	15	(Japan) Hiroaki Nagasawa	Am	2, 4
(Japan) Zenko RS Garage with Sunrise BLVD	Porsche 718 Cayman GT4 RS Clubsport	Porsche MDG.GA 4.0 L Flat-6	82	(Japan) Yoshimoto Makino	SA	All (Note: Daiki Fujiwara was listed to compete for the last round, but he withdrew. Taksehi Suehiro replaced him.)
(Japan) Zenko RS Garage with Sunrise BLVD	Porsche 718 Cayman GT4 RS Clubsport	Porsche MDG.GA 4.0 L Flat-6	82	(Japan) Daiki Fujiwara	SA	All
(Japan) Zenko RS Garage with Sunrise BLVD	Porsche 718 Cayman GT4 RS Clubsport	Porsche MDG.GA 4.0 L Flat-6	82	(Japan) Takeshi Suehiro	SA	4
Toyota Gazoo Racing Indonesia	Toyota GR Supra GT4 Evo2	BMW B58B30 3.0 L Turbo I6	39	(Indonesia) Haridarma Manoppo	SA	All
Toyota Gazoo Racing Indonesia	Toyota GR Supra GT4 Evo2	BMW B58B30 3.0 L Turbo I6	39	(Japan) Seita Nonaka	SA	All
(Japan) Murakami Motors	Porsche 718 Cayman GT4 RS Clubsport	Porsche MDG.GA 4.0 L Flat-6	88	(Japan) Hiroyuki Murakami	SA	3
(Japan) Murakami Motors	Porsche 718 Cayman GT4 RS Clubsport	Porsche MDG.GA 4.0 L Flat-6	88	(Japan) Soichiro Yoshida	SA	3
(Japan) K-tunes Racing	Toyota GR Supra GT4 Evo2	BMW B58B30 3.0 L Turbo I6	97	(Chinese Taipei) Betty Chen Yin-yu	Am	1–2
(Japan) K-tunes Racing	Toyota GR Supra GT4 Evo2	BMW B58B30 3.0 L Turbo I6	97	(Japan) Yoshichika Nagai	Am	1–2

Icon	Class
Drivers
PA	Pro-Am Cup
SA	Silver-Am Cup
Am	Am Cup

== Race results ==
Bold indicates overall winner for each car class (GT3, GTC and GT4).

GT3
Round		Circuit	Pole position	Pro/Am winners	Am winners
1	R1	SUGO	(Japan) No. 18 Team UpGarage with ACR	**(Japan) No. 9 Bingo Racing with LM corsa**	(Japan) Team Macchina
1	R1	SUGO	(Japan) "Akita" (Japan) Takashi Kobayashi	**(Japan) Ukyo Sasahara** **(Japan) Shinji Takei**	(Japan) Hirokazu Suzuki (Japan) Tadao Uematsu
1	R2	SUGO	(Japan) No. 9 Bingo Racing with LM corsa	**(Japan) No. 24 Max Racing**	(Japan) No. 1 Team Macchina
1	R2	SUGO	(Japan) Ukyo Sasahara (Japan) Shinji Takei	**(Japan) Yuya Motojima** **(Japan) Yudai Uchida**	(Japan) Hirokazu Suzuki (Japan) Tadao Uematsu
2	R1	Fuji	(Japan) No. 296 Hitotsuyama with Cornes Racing	**(Japan) No. 666 Seven x Seven Racing**	(Japan) No. 1 Team Macchina
2	R1	Fuji	(Japan) Shintaro Kawabata (Japan) Akihiro Tsuzuki	**(Japan) "Bankcy"** **(Japan) Taichi Watarai**	(Japan) Hirokazu Suzuki (Japan) Tadao Uematsu
2	R2	Fuji	(Japan) No. 9 Bingo Racing with LM corsa	**(Japan) No. 296 Hitotsuyama with Cornes Racing**	(Japan) No. 81 Team Daishin with GTNET
2	R2	Fuji	(Japan) Ukyo Sasahara (Japan) Shinji Takei	**(Japan) Shintaro Kawabata** **(Japan) Akihiro Tsuzuki**	(Japan) Ryuichiro Oyagi
3	R1	Okayama	(Japan) No. 666 Seven x Seven Racing	**(Japan) No. 9 Bingo Racing with LM corsa**	(Japan) No. 1 Team Macchina
3	R1	Okayama	(Japan) "Bankcy" (Japan) Taichi Watarai	**(Japan) Ukyo Sasahara** **(Japan) Shinji Takei**	(Japan) Hirokazu Suzuki (Japan) Tadao Uematsu
3	R2	Okayama	(Japan) No. 9 Bingo Racing with LM corsa	**(Japan) No. 45 Ponos Racing**	(Japan) No. 1 Team Macchina
3	R2	Okayama	(Japan) Ukyo Sasahara (Japan) Shinji Takei	**(Japan) Kei Cozzolino** **(Japan) Yorikatsu Tsujiko**	(Japan) Hirokazu Suzuki (Japan) Tadao Uematsu
4	R1	Suzuka	(Japan) No. 24 Max Racing	**(Japan) No. 18 Team UpGarage with ACR**	(Japan) No. 1 Team Macchina
4	R1	Suzuka	(Japan) Yuya Motojima (Japan) Yudai Uchida	**(Japan) "Akita"** **(Japan) Takashi Kobayashi**	(Japan) Hirokazu Suzuki (Japan) Tadao Uematsu
4	R2	Suzuka	(Japan) No. 45 Ponos Racing	**(Japan) No. 45 Ponos Racing**	(Japan) No. 1 Team Macchina
4	R2	Suzuka	(Japan) Kei Cozzolino (Japan) Yorikatsu Tsujiko	**(Japan) Kei Cozzolino** **(Japan) Yorikatsu Tsujiko**	(Japan) Hirokazu Suzuki (Japan) Tadao Uematsu
GTC
Round		Circuit	Pole position	Pro/Am winners	Am winners
1	R1	SUGO	(Japan) No. 888 Bingo Racing	No entries	**(Japan) No. 888 Bingo Racing**
1	R1	SUGO	(Chinese Taipei) Tiger Wu Chi-hsuan	No entries	**(Chinese Taipei) Tiger Wu Chi-hsuan**
1	R2	SUGO	(Japan) No. 888 Bingo Racing	No entries	**(Japan) No. 888 Bingo Racing**
1	R2	SUGO	(Chinese Taipei) Tiger Wu Chi-hsuan	No entries	**(Chinese Taipei) Tiger Wu Chi-hsuan**
2	R1	Fuji	(Japan) No. 27 AWD Racing	**(Japan) No. 27 AWD Racing**	(Japan) No. 888 Bingo Racing
2	R1	Fuji	(Australia) Jake Parsons (Canada) Jesse Anthony Swinimer	**(Australia) Jake Parsons** **(Canada) Jesse Anthony Swinimer**	(Chinese Taipei) Tiger Wu Chi-hsuan
2	R2	Fuji	(Japan) No. 27 AWD Racing	(Japan) No. 27 AWD Racing	**(Japan) No. 16 NGR**
2	R2	Fuji	(Australia) Jake Parsons (Canada) Jesse Anthony Swinimer	(Australia) Jake Parsons (Canada) Jesse Anthony Swinimer	**(Japan) "Hiro"**
3	R1	Okayama	(Japan) No. 888 Bingo Racing	No entries	**(Japan) No. 888 Bingo Racing**
3	R1	Okayama	(Chinese Taipei) Tiger Wu Chi-hsuan	No entries	**(Chinese Taipei) Tiger Wu Chi-hsuan**
3	R2	Okayama	(Japan) No. 888 Bingo Racing	No entries	**(Japan) No. 888 Bingo Racing**
3	R2	Okayama	(Chinese Taipei) Tiger Wu Chi-hsuan	No entries	**(Chinese Taipei) Tiger Wu Chi-hsuan**
4	R1	Suzuka	(Japan) No. 888 Bingo Racing	No entries	**(Japan) No. 888 Bingo Racing**
4	R1	Suzuka	(Chinese Taipei) Tiger Wu Chi-hsuan	No entries	**(Chinese Taipei) Tiger Wu Chi-hsuan**
4	R2	Suzuka	(Japan) No. 888 Bingo Racing	No entries	**(Japan) No. 888 Bingo Racing**
4	R2	Suzuka	(Chinese Taipei) Tiger Wu Chi-hsuan	No entries	**(Chinese Taipei) Tiger Wu Chi-hsuan**
GT4
Round		Circuit	Pole position	Silver/Am Winners	Am winners
1	R1	SUGO	No. 39 Toyota Gazoo Racing Indonesia	**No. 39 Toyota Gazoo Racing Indonesia**	(Japan) No. 97 K-tunes Racing
1	R1	SUGO	(Indonesia) Haridarma Manoppo (Japan) Seita Nonaka	**(Indonesia) Haridarma Manoppo** **(Japan) Seita Nonaka**	(Chinese Taipei) Betty Chen Yin-yu (Japan) Yoshichika Nagai
1	R2	SUGO	No. 39 Toyota Gazoo Racing Indonesia	**No. 39 Toyota Gazoo Racing Indonesia**	(Japan) No. 97 K-tunes Racing
1	R2	SUGO	(Indonesia) Haridarma Manoppo (Japan) Seita Nonaka	**(Indonesia) Haridarma Manoppo** **(Japan) Seita Nonaka**	(Chinese Taipei) Betty Chen Yin-yu (Japan) Yoshichika Nagai
2	R1	Fuji	No. 39 Toyota Gazoo Racing Indonesia	**No. 39 Toyota Gazoo Racing Indonesia**	(Japan) No. 97 K-tunes Racing
2	R1	Fuji	(Indonesia) Haridarma Manoppo (Japan) Seita Nonaka	**(Indonesia) Haridarma Manoppo** **(Japan) Seita Nonaka**	(Chinese Taipei) Betty Chen Yin-yu (Japan) Yoshichika Nagai
2	R2	Fuji	(Japan) No. 82 Zenko RS Garage with Sunrise BLVD	**No. 39 Toyota Gazoo Racing Indonesia**	No classified finishers
2	R2	Fuji	(Japan) Daiki Fujiwara (Japan) Yoshimoto Makino	**(Indonesia) Haridarma Manoppo** **(Japan) Seita Nonaka**	No classified finishers
3	R1	Okayama	No. 39 Toyota Gazoo Racing Indonesia	**No. 39 Toyota Gazoo Racing Indonesia**	No entries
3	R1	Okayama	(Indonesia) Haridarma Manoppo (Japan) Seita Nonaka	**(Indonesia) Haridarma Manoppo** **(Japan) Seita Nonaka**	No entries
3	R2	Okayama	No. 39 Toyota Gazoo Racing Indonesia	**No. 39 Toyota Gazoo Racing Indonesia**	No entries
3	R2	Okayama	(Indonesia) Haridarma Manoppo (Japan) Seita Nonaka	**(Indonesia) Haridarma Manoppo** **(Japan) Seita Nonaka**	No entries
4	R1	Suzuka	No. 39 Toyota Gazoo Racing Indonesia	(Japan) No. 82 Zenko RS Garage with Sunrise BLVD	(Japan) No. 15 Destino with Sunrise BLVD
4	R1	Suzuka	(Indonesia) Haridarma Manoppo (Japan) Seita Nonaka	**(Japan) Yoshimoto Makino** **(Japan) Takeshi Suehiro**	(Japan) Kohei Azuma (Japan) Hiroaki Nagasawa
4	R2	Suzuka	No. 39 Toyota Gazoo Racing Indonesia	**No. 39 Toyota Gazoo Racing Indonesia**	(Japan) No. 15 Destino with Sunrise BLVD
4	R2	Suzuka	(Indonesia) Haridarma Manoppo (Japan) Seita Nonaka	**(Indonesia) Haridarma Manoppo** **(Japan) Seita Nonaka**	(Japan) Kohei Azuma (Japan) Hiroaki Nagasawa

== Championship standings ==
Scoring system

Championship points are awarded for the first ten positions in each race. Entries are required to complete 75% of the winning car's race distance in order to be classified and earn points. Individual drivers are required to participate for a minimum of 25 minutes in order to earn championship points in any race.

Position	**1st**	**2nd**	**3rd**	**4th**	**5th**	**6th**	**7th**	**8th**	**9th**	**10th**
Points	25	18	15	12	10	8	6	4	2	1

=== Drivers' championships ===
Pos.	Driver	Team	SUG		FUJ		OKA		SUZ		Points
GT3
1	(Japan) Shintaro Kawabata (Japan) Akihiro Tsuzuki	(Japan) Hitotsuyama with Cornes Racing	3	3	**2**	1	7	5	3	2	122
2	(Japan) Kei Cozzolino (Japan) Yorikatsu Tsujiko	(Japan) Ponos Racing	2	Ret	Ret	2	17†	1	2	**1**	104
3	(Japan) "Bankcy"	(Japan) Seven x Seven Racing	4	4	1	4	**6**	2	4	8	103
4	(Japan) Ukyo Sasahara (Japan) Shinji Takei	(Japan) Bingo Racing with LM corsa	1	**2**	7	**8**	1	**3**	8	18	97
5	(Japan) "Akita" (Japan) Takashi Kobayashi	(Japan) Team UpGarage with ACR	**6**	9	3	16	2	6	1	3	91
6	(Japan) Taichi Watarai	(Japan) Seven x Seven Racing			1	4	**6**	2	4	8	79
7	(Japan) Yuya Motojima (Japan) Yudai Uchida	(Japan) Max Racing	5	1	Ret	5	9	4	**5**	6	77
8	(Japan) Hirokazu Suzuki (Japan) Tadao Uematsu	(Japan) Team Macchina	9	7	6	10	8	7	7	5	43
9	(Japan) Nirei Fukuzumi (Japan) Kazunori Suenaga	(Japan) K-tunes Racing	8	6	5	7	5	17	11	Ret	38
10	(Japan) Yusaku Maezawa (Japan) Naoki Yokomizo	(Japan) Maezawa Racing	Ret	Ret	4	3	Ret	12	6	9	37
11	(Japan) Shinichi Takagi (Japan) Daisuke Yamawaki	(Japan) K-tunes Racing	7	5	17	Ret	3	Ret			31
12	(Japan) Taku Bamba (Japan) Norikazu Shibata	(Japan) Norik Racing					4	8	9	4	30
13	(Japan) Kiyoto Fujinami	(Japan) Seven x Seven Racing	4	4							24
14	(Japan) Ryuichiro Oyagi	(Japan) Team Daishin with GTNET			8	6	10	9	18	7	21
15	(Japan) Masayoshi Oyama (Japan) Masayuki Ueda	(Japan) Akiland Racing	10	8					10	10	7
16	(Japan) Ryuichiro Oyagi	(Japan) Team Daishin with GTNET			8	6					3
17	(Japan) Masaaki Nishikawa (Japan) Atsushi Tanaka	(Japan) RunUp Sports	14	10	10	Ret	13	11	19	12	3
18	(Japan) Nobuhiro Imada (Japan) Yasuhiro Shimizu	(Japan) Art Taste with JMS Racing			Ret	9					2
19	(Japan) Kazuki Ota (Japan) Takashi Toyoda	(Japan) Car Guy Racing	Ret	DNS	11	15	12	10	12	11	2
—	(Japan) "Galah" (Japan) Natsu Sakaguchi	(Japan) Galah Racing With GTNET			12	11					0
GTC
1	(Chinese Taipei) Tiger Wu Chi-hsuan	(Japan) Bingo Racing	**11**	**10**	13	14	**11**	**13**	**13**	**13**	183
2	(Japan) Tomohisa Furuya (Japan) Satoshi Kono	(Japan) Hipoint Racing	15	11	20	19					52
3	(Australia) Jake Parsons (Canada) Jesse Anthony Swinimer	(Japan) AWD Racing			**9**	**13**					43
4	(Japan) "Hiro"	(Japan) NGR			14	12					40
5	(Japan) Makoto Haga (Japan) Mineki Okura	(Japan) Gama 83 Racing			15	16					24
6	(Japan) Takashi Sano (Japan) Takuya Shirasaka	(Japan) Caratt Racing			16	17					20
GT4
1	(Indonesia) Haridarma Manoppo (Japan) Seita Nonaka	Toyota Gazoo Racing Indonesia	**12**	**9**	**18**	20	**14**	**14**	**15**	**14**	193
2	(Japan) Yoshimoto Makino	(Japan) Zenko RS Garage with Sunrise BLVD	13	12	19	**21**	15	15	14	16	151
3	(Japan) Daiki Fujiwara	(Japan) Zenko RS Garage with Sunrise BLVD	13	12	19	**21**	15	15	WD	WD	108
4	(Chinese Taipei) Betty Chen Yin-yu (Japan) Yoshichika Nagai	(Japan) K-tunes Racing	16	15	21	Ret					45
5	(Japan) Takeshi Suehiro	(Japan) Zenko RS Garage with Sunrise BLVD							14	16	43
6	(Japan) Hiroyuki Murakami (Japan) Soichiro Yoshida	(Japan) Murakami Motors					16	16			30
7	(Japan) Kohei Azuma (Japan) Hiroaki Nagasawa	(Japan) Destino with Sunrise BLVD			DNS	DNS			16	16	30
Guest drivers ineligible to score points
GT4
—	(Hong Kong) Tony Fong Wai Shing (Hong Kong) Terence Tse Kin Leung	(Japan) TTR with Akiland Racing							17	17	0
Pos.	Driver	Team	SUG		FUJ		OKA		SUZ		Points

Colour	Result
Gold	Winner
Silver	Second place
Bronze	Third place
Green	Points classification
Blue	Non-points classification
Blue	Non-classified finish (NC)
Purple	Retired, not classified (Ret)
Red	Did not qualify (DNQ)
Red	Did not pre-qualify (DNPQ)
Black	Disqualified (DSQ)
White	Did not start (DNS)
White	Withdrew (WD)
White	Race cancelled (C)
Blank	Did not practice (DNP)
Blank	Did not arrive (DNA)
Blank	Excluded (EX)

**Bold** – Pole

Italics – Fastest Lap

Notes:

- † – Drivers did not finish the race, but were classified as they completed more than 90% of the race distance.

==== Pro-Am Cup ====
Pos.	Driver	Team	SUG		FUJ		OKA		SUZ		Points
GT3
1	(Japan) Shintaro Kawabata (Japan) Akihiro Tsuzuki	(Japan) Hitotsuyama with Cornes Racing	3	3	**2**	1	7	5	3	2	122
2	(Japan) Kei Cozzolino (Japan) Yorikatsu Tsujiko	(Japan) Ponos Racing	2	Ret	Ret	2	8†	1	2	**1**	108
3	(Japan) Ukyo Sasahara (Japan) Shinji Takei	(Japan) Bingo Racing with LM corsa	1	**2**	6	**7**	1	**3**	7	8	107
4	(Japan) "Bankcy"	(Japan) Seven x Seven Racing	4	4	1	4	**6**	2	4	6	107
5	(Japan) "Akita" (Japan) Takashi Kobayashi	(Japan) Team UpGarage with ACR	**6**	7	3	10	2	6	1	3	97
6	(Japan) Taichi Watarai	(Japan) Seven x Seven Racing			1	4	**6**	2	4	6	83
7	(Japan) Yuya Motojima (Japan) Yudai Uchida	(Japan) Max Racing	5	1	Ret	5	8	4	**5**	5	81
8	(Japan) Yusaku Maezawa (Japan) Naoki Yokomizo	(Japan) Maezawa Racing	Ret	Ret	4	3	Ret	8	6	7	45
9	(Japan) Nirei Fukuzumi (Japan) Kazunori Suenaga	(Japan) K-tunes Racing	8	6	5	6	5	9	9	Ret	44
10	(Japan) Shinichi Takagi (Japan) Daisuke Yamawaki	(Japan) K-tunes Racing	7	5	11	Ret	3	Ret			37
11	(Japan) Taku Bamba (Japan) Norikazu Shibata	(Japan) Norik Racing					4	7	8	4	36
12	(Japan) Kiyoto Fujinami	(Japan) Seven x Seven Racing	4	4							24
13	(Japan) "Galah" (Japan) Natsu Sakaguchi	(Japan) Galah Racing With GTNET			8	8					10
GTC
1	(Australia) Jake Parsons (Canada) Jesse Anthony Swinimer	(Japan) AWD Racing			**7**	**9**					50
2	(Japan) Makoto Haga (Japan) Mineki Okura	(Japan) Gama 83 Racing			9	11					36
3	(Japan) Takashi Sano (Japan) Takuya Shirasaka	(Japan) Caratt Racing			10	12					30
Pos.	Driver	Team	SUG		FUJ		OKA		SUZ		Points

==== Silver-Am Cup ====
Pos.	Driver	Team	SUG		FUJ		OKA		SUZ		Points
GT4
1	(Indonesia) Haridarma Manoppo (Japan) Seita Nonaka	Toyota Gazoo Racing Indonesia	**1**	**1**	**1**	1	**1**	**1**	**2**	**1**	193
2	(Japan) Yoshimoto Makino	(Japan) Zenko RS Garage with Sunrise BLVD	2	2	2	**2**	2	2	1	2	151
3	(Japan) Daiki Fujiwara	(Japan) Zenko RS Garage with Sunrise BLVD	2	2	2	**2**	2	2	WD	WD	108
4	(Japan) Takeshi Suehiro	(Japan) Zenko RS Garage with Sunrise BLVD							1	2	43
5	(Japan) Hiroyuki Murakami (Japan) Soichiro Yoshida	(Japan) Murakami Motors					3	3			30
Pos.	Driver	Team	SUG		FUJ		OKA		SUZ		Points

==== Am Cup ====
Pos.	Driver	Team	SUG		FUJ		OKA		SUZ		Points
GT3
1	(Japan) Hirokazu Suzuki (Japan) Tadao Uematsu	(Japan) Team Macchina	**1**	**1**	1	3	**1**	**1**	1	**1**	190
2	(Japan) Ryuichiro Oyagi	(Japan) Team Daishin with GTNET			2	**1**	2	2	**5**	2	109
3	(Japan) Masaaki Nishikawa (Japan) Atsushi Tanaka	(Japan) RunUp Sports	3	3	3	Ret	5	4	6	5	89
4	(Japan) Kazuki Ota (Japan) Takashi Toyoda	(Japan) Car Guy Racing	Ret	DNS	4	6	4	3	3	4	81
5	(Japan) Masayoshi Oyama (Japan) Masayuki Ueda	(Japan) Akiland Racing	2	2					2	3	69
6	(Japan) Nobuyuki Oyagi	(Japan) Team Daishin with GTNET					2	2			36
7	(Japan) Nobuhiro Imada (Japan) Yasuhiro Shimizu	(Japan) Art Taste with JMS Racing			**Ret**	2					18
GTC
1	(Chinese Taipei) Tiger Wu Chi-hsuan	(Japan) Bingo Racing	**4**	**4**	**5**	5	**3**	**5**	**4**	**6**	168
2	(Japan) Tomohisa Furuya (Japan) Satoshi Kono	(Japan) Hipoint Racing	5	5	7	7					66
3	(Japan) "Hiro"	(Japan) NGR			6	4					43
GT4
1	(Chinese Taipei) Betty Chen Yin-yu (Japan) Yoshichika Nagai	(Japan) K-tunes Racing	**6**	**6**	8	**Ret**					75
2	(Japan) Kohei Azuma (Japan) Hiroaki Nagasawa	(Japan) Destino with Sunrise BLVD			**DNS**	DNS			**7**	**7**	50
Guest drivers ineligible to score points
GT4
—	(Hong Kong) Tony Fong Wai Shing (Hong Kong) Terence Tse Kin Leung	(Japan) TTR with Akiland Racing							8	8	0
Pos.	Driver	Team	SUG		FUJ		OKA		SUZ		Points

=== Teams' Championship ===
Pos.	Team	SUG		FUJ		OKA		SUZ		Points
GT3
1	(Japan) Hitotsuyama with Cornes Racing	3	3	2	1	7	5	3	2	122
2	(Japan) Ponos Racing	2	Ret	Ret	2	17†	1	2	1	104
3	(Japan) Seven x Seven Racing	4	4	1	4	6	2	4	8	103
4	(Japan) Bingo Racing with LM corsa	1	2	7	8	1	3	8	18	97
5	(Japan) Team UpGarage with ACR	6	9	3	16	2	6	1	3	91
6	(Japan) Max Racing	5	1	Ret	5	9	4	5	6	77
7	(Japan) K-tunes Racing	7	5	5	7	3	17	11	Ret	69
7	(Japan) K-tunes Racing	8	6	17	Ret	5	Ret			69
8	(Japan) Team Macchina	9	7	6	10	8	7	7	5	43
9	(Japan) Maezawa Racing	Ret	Ret	4	3	Ret	12	6	9	37
10	(Japan) Norik Racing					4	8	9	4	30
11	(Japan) Team Daishin with GTNET			8	6	10	9	18	7	21
12	(Japan) Akiland Racing	10	8					10	10	7
13	(Japan) RunUp Sports	14	10	10	Ret	13	11	19	12	3
14	(Japan) Art Taste with JMS Racing			Ret	9					2
15	(Japan) Car Guy Racing	Ret	DNS	11	15	12	10	12	11	2
—	(Japan) Galah Racing With GTNET			12	11					0
GTC
1	(Japan) Bingo Racing	11	10	13	14	11	13	13	13	183
2	(Japan) Hipoint Racing	15	11	20	19					52
3	(Japan) AWD Racing			9	13					43
4	(Japan) NGR			14	12					40
5	(Japan) Gama 83 Racing			15	16					24
6	(Japan) Caratt Racing			16	17					20
GT4
1	Toyota Gazoo Racing Indonesia	12	9	18	20	14	14	15	14	193
2	(Japan) Zenko RS Garage with Sunrise BLVD	13	12	19	21	15	15	14	16	151
4	(Japan) K-tunes Racing	16	15	21	Ret					45
6	(Japan) Murakami Motors					16	16			30
7	(Japan) Destino with Sunrise BLVD			DNS	DNS			16	16	30
8	(Japan) TTR with Akiland Racing							17	17	24
Pos.	Team	SUG		FUJ		OKA		SUZ		Points

== See also ==
- 2025 GT World Challenge Asia
- 2025 Thailand Super Series
- 2025 British GT Championship
- 2025 Intercontinental GT Challenge
