= Yuta Kamimura =

Japanese racing driver (born 1995)

- Nationality: (Japan) Japanese
- Born: 26 April 1995 (age 31) Kobe, Japan
- Categorisation: FIA Silver

Championship titles
- 2023: SRO Japan Cup

Yuta Kamimura (上村 優太, Kamimura Yūta; born 26 April 1995 in Kobe) is a Japanese racing driver. He is the 2023 SRO Japan Cup champion.

== Early career ==
=== Formula 4 ===
In 2014, Kamimura graduated from the Suzuka Circuit Racing School Formula with a scholarship to compete in the inaugural season of the F4 Japanese Championship for Honda Formula Dream Project. Despite scoring a fifth-place finish in the season opener at Okayama, he did not score another top-five finish until the season-ending Motegi round, where he finished fourth and ended his maiden season in single-seaters 12th in points.

Kamimura returned to HFDP for the 2016 season. Despite a double podium at the opening round of the season at Okayama, Kamimura only scored points five more times and ended the season 14th in the standings.

=== Porsche Carrera Cup Japan ===
After leaving single-seaters at the end of 2016, Porsche Japan and the PCCJ Committee selected Kamimura for their 2017 scholarship, which saw him compete on full-time basis in Porsche Carrera Cup Japan. In his first season in the series, Kamimura finished runner-up to Shinji Takei.

Kamimura returned to PCCJ for 2018, after being retained for the scholarship program alongside Yoshiaki Katayama. After finishing runner-up in the season-ending race at Suzuka, Kamimura ended the season second in points to Tsubasa Kondo.

Returning to Carrera Cup Japan for the next two seasons, Kamimura joined Porsche Center Okazaki and finished runner-up in both seasons, to Ukyo Sasahara in 2019, and to Ryo Ogawa in 2020.

== GT career ==
=== GT World Challenge Asia ===
In late 2018, ARN Racing announced that Kamimura would drive for them in GT World Challenge Asia alongside Hiroaki Nagai. Despite a slow start to the season, Kamimura took his maiden podium in race one at Suzuka and scored points twice more to finish 22nd in the standings. Having been announced to return to the series for 2020 with ARN alongside Nagai, Kamimura returned to the series when it was relaunched in 2022, still alongside Nagai but changing to Porsche Center Okazaki for his sophomore season in the championship.

On his series return, Kamimura finished on the podium three times, at Suzuka, Fuji and the season-ending race at Okayama to end the season eighth in the overall standings and third in the Japan Cup standings. In 2023, Kamimura returned to GTWC Asia, along with a full-time campaign in Japan Cup. In the main series, Kamimura scored two podiums, a third-place finish in race one at Suzuka and a second-place finish at Motegi's race two en route to a tenth place finish in the points. In Japan Cup, Kamimura won both of the races at Motegi and scored four more podiums to become champion at the season-ending round at Okayama.

Kamimura continued his partnership with Porsche Center Okazaki for the 2024 season. Having only scored points three times across the season, Kamimura finished 34th in the standings with a best result of sixth in race one at Suzuka. Returning to GT World Challenge Asia for 2025, Kamimura only raced in the season-opening round in Sepang, finishing third in the Silver-Am class in race three.

=== Super GT ===
In 2021, Kamimura made his GT300 debut, racing in the second round of that year's Super GT season for apr's number 30 GR Sport Prius alongside Hiroaki Nagai and Manabu Orido. On his maiden outing, Kamimura finished 18th. The following year, Kamimura made an unexpected return to Super GT, replacing Hiroaki Nagai at the fifth round of the season at Suzuka. Kamimura went from 21st to take his maiden podium in Super GT, by finishing third. For 2023, Kamimura stayed with apr as a third driver. Racing in half of the season's rounds, Kamimura scored a best finish of ninth at the third round of the season at Suzuka.

=== Endurance racing ===
During 2017, Kamimura made a one-off appearance in the LMP3 class of the Asian Le Mans Series, driving for TKS alongside Shinyo Sato and Takuya Shirasaka. In his only start in the series, Kamimura finished third. During his sophomore season in Carrera Cup Japan, Kamimura made his GT3 debut in that year's Suzuka 10 Hours for Callaway Competition with Bingo Racing alongside Yuichi Mikasa and Shinji Takei.

In 2025, Kamimura returned to Endurance racing, driving for D'station Racing in the ST-X class of the Super Taikyu Series. Competing in all but one races in the class, Kamimura scored his first series win at SUGO to help the team secure fourth in the ST-X standings. Kamimura also made a one-off appearance in the ST-1 class at the Fuji 24 Hours for the same team, which he won alongside Satoshi Hoshino, Kenji Hama, Taiga Kabaki, Tatsuya Hoshino and Tetsuya Tanaka.

The following year, Kamimura returned to D'station Racing to compete in the ST-X class of Super Taikyu.

== Racing record ==
=== Racing career summary ===
Season	Series	Team	Races	Wins	Poles	F/Laps	Podiums	Points	Position
2015	F4 Japanese Championship	Honda Formula Dream Project	14	0	0	1	0	35	12th
2016	F4 Japanese Championship	Honda Formula Dream Project	14	0	0	0	2	45	14th
2017	Porsche Carrera Cup Japan	Porsche Japan Junior Programme	10	3			9	176	**2nd**
2017–18	Asian Le Mans Series – LMP3	TKS	1	0	0	0	1	15	9th
2018	Porsche Carrera Cup Japan	Porsche Japan Junior Programme	11	3			9	182	**2nd**
2018	Suzuka 10 Hours	Callaway Competition with Bingo Racing	1	0	0	0	0	N/A	26th
2018	Porsche Carrera Cup Asia	LKM Racing	1	0	0	0	0	9	33rd
2018	Super Taikyu – ST-1	apr	1	1	1	1	1	76‡	**2nd‡**
2018	Super Taikyu – ST-5	Team221	1	1	0	0	1	132‡	**1st‡**
2019	Porsche Carrera Cup Japan	Porsche Center Okazaki	10	3			8	154	**2nd**
2019	Blancpain GT World Challenge Asia	ARN Racing	9	0	0	0	1	25	22nd
2019	Blancpain GT World Challenge Asia – Pro-Am	ARN Racing	9	2	1	0	2	82	10th
2019	Intercontinental GT Challenge	apr with ARN Racing	1	0	0	0	0	0	NC
2020	Porsche Carrera Cup Japan	Porsche Center Okazaki	8	4			6	132	**2nd**
2020	Super Taikyu – ST-X	Porsche Center Okazaki	2	1	0	1	1	20‡	6th‡
2020	Super Taikyu – ST-X	apr	2	0	0	0	1	79‡	5th‡
2021	Super GT – GT300	apr	1	0	0	0	0	0	NC
2021	Super Taikyu – ST-X	apr	1	0	0	0	0	64‡	5th‡
2021	Super Taikyu – ST-X	Porsche Center Okazaki	5	2	3	0	4	98.5‡	**3rd‡**
2022	GT World Challenge Asia	Porsche Center Okazaki	6	0	0	0	3	67	8th
2022	GT World Challenge Asia – Pro-Am	Porsche Center Okazaki	6	0	0	0	4	74	6th
2022	Super Taikyu – ST-X	Porsche Center Okazaki	6	2	5	0	5	111‡	**3rd‡**
2022	Super Taikyu – ST-X	apr	1	0	0	0	0	83‡	6th‡
2022	Super GT – GT300	apr	1	0	0	0	1	11	22nd
2023	Super GT – GT300	apr	4	0	0	0	0	2	24th
2023	Super Taikyu – ST-X	apr	1	0	0	0	0	118‡	**2nd‡**
2023	GT World Challenge Asia	Porsche Center Okazaki	12	0	0	0	2	71	10th
2023	GT World Challenge Asia – Silver-Am	Porsche Center Okazaki	12	0	0	0	2	78	9th
2023	SRO Japan Cup	Porsche Center Okazaki	8	2	1	0	6	133	**1st**
2024	GT World Challenge Asia	Porsche Center Okazaki	10	0	0	0	0	11	34th
2024	GT World Challenge Asia – Silver-Am	Porsche Center Okazaki	10	0	0	0	4	104	9th
2024	Porsche Carrera Cup Japan	Hyper Water Racing	2	0	0	1	1	27	15th
2024	Super Taikyu – ST-4	Asano Racing Service	2	5	0	0	0	65‡	5th‡
2025	GT World Challenge Asia	Porsche Center Okazaki	2	0	0	0	0	0	NC
2025	GT World Challenge Asia – Silver-Am	Porsche Center Okazaki	2	0	0	0	1	23	18th
2025	Super Taikyu – ST-X	D'station Racing	6	1	1	0	4	95‡	4th‡
2025	Super Taikyu – ST-1	D'station Racing	1	1	0	0	1	145‡	**1st‡**
2026	Super Taikyu – ST-X	D'station Racing						‡	‡
2026	Intercontinental GT Challenge	Porsche Center Okazaki - NK Racing	1	0	0	0	0	0	NC

‡ Team standings

=== Complete F4 Japanese Championship results ===
(key) (Races in bold indicate pole position) (Races in italics indicate fastest lap)

Year	Team	1	2	3	4	5	6	7	8	9	10	11	12	13	14	DC	Pts
2015	Honda Formula Dream Project	OKA; 1 Ret	OKA; 2; 5	FUJ1; 1; 11	FUJ1; 2; 15	FUJ2; 1 Ret	FUJ2; 2; 12	SUZ; 1; 8	SUZ; 2; 10	SUG; 1; 8	SUG; 2; 6	AUT; 1; 16	AUT; 2; 15	MOT; 1; 7	MOT; 2; 4	12th	35
2016	Honda Formula Dream Project	OKA; 1; 3	OKA; 2; 2	FUJ1; 1; 9	FUJ1; 2; 10	SUG; 1; 7	SUG; 2 Ret	FUJ2; 1; 12	FUJ2; 2; 9	FUJ2; 3; 28	SUZ; 1; 14	SUZ; 2; 21	MOT; 1 Ret	MOT; 2; 10	MOT; 3; 18	14th	45

=== Complete Asian Le Mans Series results ===
(key) (Races in bold indicate pole position) (Races in italics indicate fastest lap)

Year	Team	Class	Car	Engine	1	2	3	4	Pos.	Points
2017–18	TKS	LMP3	Ginetta-Juno LMP3	Nissan VK50 5.0 L V8	ZHU	FUJ; 3	BUR	SEP	9th	15

=== Complete GT World Challenge Asia results ===
(key) (Races in bold indicate pole position) (Races in italics indicate fastest lap)

Year	Team	Car	Class	1	2	3	4	5	6	7	8	9	10	11	12	DC	Points
2019	ARN Racing	Porsche 911 GT3 R	Pro-Am	SEP; 1; 28	SEP; 2; 12	CHA; 1; 14	CHA; 2; 19	SUZ; 1; 3	SUZ; 2; 12	**FSW**; **1**; 6	FSW; 2; 9	KOR; 1	KOR; 2	SIC; 1 Ret	SIC; 2 DNS	10th	82
2022	Porsche Centre Okazaki	Porsche 911 GT3 R	Pro-Am	SEP; 1	SEP; 2	SUZ; 1; 2	SUZ; 2 Ret	FUJ; 1; 3	FUJ; 2; 2	SUG; 1	SUG; 2	OKA; 1; 6	OKA; 2; 3			6th	74
2023	Porsche Centre Okazaki	Porsche 911 GT3 R (992)	Pro-Am	BUR; 1; 6	BUR; 2; 16	FSW; 1; 15	FSW; 2; 13	SUZ; 1; 3	SUZ; 2; 10	MOT; 1; 2	MOT; 2; 4	OKA; 1; 8	OKA; 2; 13	SEP; 1; 6	SEP; 2; 4	9th	78
2024	Porsche Centre Okazaki	Porsche 911 GT3 R (992)	Silver-Am	SEP; 1; 2	SEP; 2; 2	BUR; 1 Ret	BUR; 2; 10	FSW; 1	FSW; 2	SUZ; 1; 3	SUZ; 2; 5	OKA; 1; 2	OKA; 2; 5	SIC; 1; 6	SIC; 2; 10	9th	104
2025	Porsche Centre Okazaki	Porsche 911 GT3 R (992)	Silver-Am	SEP; 1; 6	SEP; 2; 3	MAN; 1	MAN; 2	BUR; 1	BUR; 2	FUJ; 1	FUJ; 2	OKA; 1	OKA; 2	BEI; 1	BEI; 2	18th	23

=== Complete Super GT results ===
(key) (Races in bold indicate pole position; races in italics indicate fastest lap)

Year	Team	Car	Class	1	2	3	4	5	6	7	8	DC	Points
2021	apr	Toyota GR Sport Prius PHV apr GT	GT300	OKA	FUJ; 18	SUZ	MOT	SUG	AUT	MOT	FUJ	NC	0
2022	apr	Toyota GR86 GT300	GT300	OKA	FUJ	SUZ	FUJ	SUZ; 3	SUG	AUT	MOT	22nd	11
2023	apr	Toyota GR86 GT300	GT300	OKA; 13	FUJ1	SUZ1; 9	FUJ2	SUZ2; 17	SUG	AUT; 16	MOT	24th	2

^{*} Season still in progress.
