= SRO Japan Cup =

GT World Challenge: Asia, Current

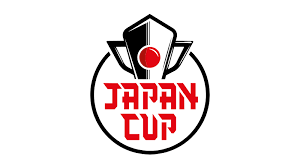
- Category: Grand tourer sportscars
- Country: Japan
- Inaugural season: 2022
- Drivers' champion: GT3: (Japan) Shintaro Kawabata (Japan) Akihiro Tsuzuki GTC: (Chinese Taipei) Tiger Wu GT4: (Indonesia) Haridarma Manoppo (Japan) Seita Nonaka
- Teams' champion: GT3: (Japan) Hitotsuyama with Cornes Racing GTC: (Japan) Bingo Racing GT4: Toyota Gazoo Racing Indonesia
- Official website: japancup.co

The SRO Japan Cup is a racing series operated by SRO Motorsports Group and Team Asia One GT Management's GT World Challenge Asia, an auto racing series for grand tourer cars in Japan. The races are contested with GT3-spec and GT4-spec cars. The series used to compete together alongside GT World Challenge Asia, but as of 2024, the Japan Cup is held as a stand-alone series.

== Circuits ==
- **Bold** denotes a circuit is used in the 2026 season.
- **Italic** denotes a future circuit will be used in the 2027 season.

Number	Circuits	Rounds	Years
1	(Mie Prefecture) **Suzuka Circuit**	5	2022–present
1	(Shizuoka Prefecture) **Fuji Speedway**	5	2022–present
1	(Okayama Prefecture) **Okayama International Circuit**	5	2022–2026
4	(Miyagi Prefecture) **Sportsland Sugo**	4	2022, 2024–2026
5	(Tochigi Prefecture) **Mobility Resort Motegi**	1	2023, 2027

== Champions ==
=== Drivers ===
Bold indicates overall champion for each car class (GT3 and GT4).

Year	GT3 Pro-Am	GT3 Am	GTC	GT4 Silver-Am	GT4 Am
2022	**(Japan) Kei Cozzolino** **(Japan) Takeshi Kimura**	(Japan) Yudai Uchida (Japan) Tadao Uematsu	—	**(Japan) Hiroaki Hatano** **(Japan) Shinya Hosokawa**	(Japan) Masayoshi Oyama
2023	**(Japan) Yuta Kamimura** **(Japan) Hiroaki Nagai**	(Japan) Yorikatsu Tsujiko (Japan) Yusuke Yamasaki	—	**(Japan) Masaki Kano** **(Japan) Manabu Orido**	(Japan) Sho Kobayashi (Japan) Naohiko Otsuka
2024	**(Japan) Shinichi Takagi** **(Japan) Daisuke Yamawaki**	(Japan) Tadao Uematsu	—	**(Japan) Takeshi Suehiro**	(Japan) Kenji Hama (Japan) Tatsuya Hoshino
2025	**(Japan) Shintaro Kawabata** **(Japan) Akihiro Tsuzuki**	(Japan) Hirokazu Suzuki (Japan) Tadao Uematsu	(Chinese Taipei) Tiger Wu Chi-hsuan	**(Indonesia) Haridarma Manoppo** **(Japan) Seita Nonaka**	(Chinese Taipei) Betty Chen Yin-yu (Japan) Yoshichika Nagai

=== Teams ===
Year	GT3	GTC	GT4
2024	(Japan) K-tunes Racing	—	(Japan) Wakayama Toyota with Hojust Racing
2025	(Japan) Hitotsuyama with Cornes Racing	(Japan) Bingo Racing	Toyota Gazoo Racing Indonesia

== See also ==
- British GT Championship
- GT World Challenge Europe
- GT World Challenge Europe Endurance Cup
- GT World Challenge Europe Sprint Cup
- GT World Challenge America
- GT World Challenge Asia
- GT World Challenge Australia
