= Shintaro Kawabata =

Japanese racing driver (born 1992)

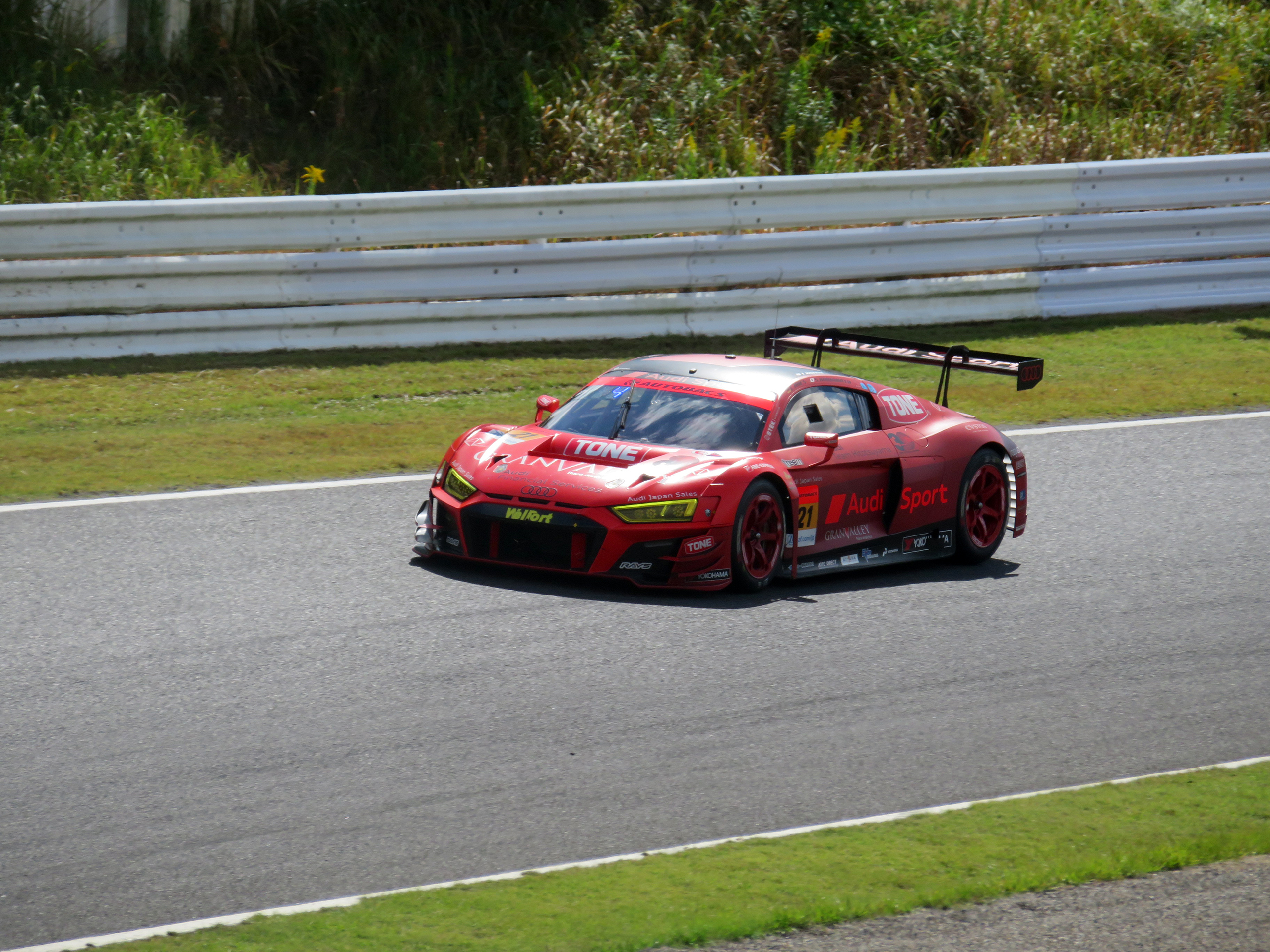
- Kawabata in 2020
- Nationality: (Japan) Japanese
- Born: 14 September 1992 (age 34) Osaka Prefecture, Japan
- Categorisation: FIA Silver

Championship titles
- 2025–2026 2025–2026 2020 2013: SRO Japan Cup – GT3; SRO Japan Cup – GT3 Pro-Am; Super Taikyu – ST-TCR; JAF Formula 4 West

Shintaro Kawabata (川端 伸太朗, Kawabata Shintarō; born 14 September 1992 in Osaka Prefecture) is a Japanese racing driver who last competed for Hitotsuyama Racing in SRO Japan Cup. He is the 2013 JAF Formula 4 West, as well as the 2025 and 2026 SRO Japan Cup champion.

Kawabata is mentored by Juichi and Shigekazu Wakisaka and was also Keiji Matsumoto's last protégé.

== Early career ==
=== Junior formulae ===
Following a karting career where he won the 2007 JAF Junior Kart Championship, Kawabata stepped up to single-seaters in 2011, earning a scholarship from the Formula Toyota Racing School to compete in Formula Challenge Japan. Kawabata spent two years in the championship, where he only scored two podiums, both of which coming at the last round of the 2012 season at Suzuka.

In parallel to his Carrera Cup Japan commitments, Kawabata also raced in the JAF Formula 4 West Championship for Succeed Sports, which he would win ahead of Tairoku Yamaguchi.

Having spent 2014 on the sidelines, Kawabata returned to single-seaters in 2015, returning to Succeed Sports to race in the inaugural season of the F4 Japanese Championship. Having been spun out of podium contention at Okayama, Kawabata scored his first top-five finish in the series at the following round in Fuji. After not scoring points in the following four rounds, Kawabata scored two top-five finishes in the last round of the season at Motegi and ended the season 13th in points.

Returning to the F4 Japanese Championship for the 2016 season and staying with Succeed Sports, Kawabata won both races of the opening round at Okayama to kick off the season. Despite the two wins, Kawabata's best result over the rest of the season was sixth, scored at both Sugo and Fuji, ending his sophomore season 9th in the standings.

=== Porsche Carrera Cup Japan ===
In early 2013, Kawabata was selected by Porsche Japan for their PCCJ Young Driver Development Program, which saw the Osaka-born driver compete in that year's Carrera Cup Japan season. In his only season in the category, Kawabata scored two wins, both at the final round of the season at Suzuka and ended the season sixth in points.

== Super GT ==
In early 2017, Kawabata made his Super GT debut, racing for Team UpGarage with Bandoh alongside Yuhki Nakayama. Kawabata scored his first points at the second round of the season at Fuji by taking ninth and scored further points at Chang, finishing seventh and ending the season 20th on six points.

Ahead of the 2018 season, Kawabata joined Team Taisan for his sophomore season in GT300, partnering Shinnosuke Yamada. Kawabata finished ninth in the season opener at Okayama, which would be the team's only points finish of the season as they finished 21st in the standings.

In 2020, Kawabata returned to Super GT, joining Audi Team Hitotsuyama alongside Christopher Mies. With Mies unable to enter Japan due to the pandemic, Kawabata was joined by Tsubasa Kondo on the eve of the season opening round at Fuji. After scoring points at Fuji and Motegi, the pair scored their only win of the season at Suzuka and concluded the season 11th in points.

Kawabata returned to Audi Team Hitotsuyama for 2021, partnering Takuro Shinohara for his fourth season in Super GT. At the penultimate round of the season at Motegi, he scored his second win in GT300 and ended the season 15th in points.

Following Satoshi Motoyama's departure from Super GT after the opening round of the 2022 Super GT season, Kawabata joined Team LeMans as a third driver for the first Fuji round of the season. Kawabata finished 14th in the Golden Week endurance. For the second Fuji round, Kawabata joined Pacific Racing Team as a third driver alongside Kei Cozzolino and Takeshi Kimura. In his second one-off appearance of the season, Kawabata finished 12th. In early 2023, it was announced that Kawabata would return to Pacific Racing Team as a third driver alongside Liang Jiatong and Ryohei Sakaguchi. In his four starts, Kawabata finished 11th at the second Suzuka round, which would turn out to be the team's best finish of the season.

During 2026, Kawabata returned to Super GT competition, competing with Ferrari-fielding Ponos Racing from round three onwards as a replacement for Kei Cozzolino, taking pole on his return at Fuji and a best result of fourth to take 11th in the GT300 standings.

== Other racing ==
In 2025, Kawabata returned to Hitotsuyama Racing to compete in the SRO Japan Cup alongside Akihiro Tsuzuki. In his maiden season in the series, he won race two at Fuji and stood on the podium in all but two races to clinch overall and GT3 Pro-Am titles at the season-ending round at Suzuka.

The following year, Kawabata remained with Hitotsuyama to defend his SRO Japan Cup title, continuing in GT3 Pro-Am alongside Tsuzuki. In his second season in the series, Kawabata won four of the season's eight races to clinch the overall and GT3 Pro-Am titles on countback over the #24 Max Racing Mercedes-AMG pairing of Yuya Motojima and Yusaku Shibata.

== Karting record ==
=== Karting career summary ===
Season	Series	Team	Position
2007	JAF Junior Kart Championship		1st
2008	All-Japan Karting Championship – KF2		4th
2008	CIK-FIA Asia Pacific Championship – KF1	Birel Pacific Motor Sport	13th
2008	CIK-FIA Asia Pacific Championship – KF2	Tigre	17th
2009	All-Japan Karting Championship – KF1		9th
2009	SL National Championship – Super KT		1st
2009	Karting World Cup – SKF & KF1	Takagi Planning	14th
2010	All-Japan Karting Championship – KF		16th
2010	SL National Championship – Super KT		4th
2010	Karting World Cup – SKF & KF1	Takagi Planning	5th

== Racing record ==
=== Racing career summary ===
Season	Series	Team	Races	Wins	Poles	F/Laps	Podiums	Points	Position
2011	Formula Challenge Japan	FTRS Scholarship	13	0	0	0	0	2	12th
2012	Formula Challenge Japan	FTRS Scholarship	12	0	0	0	2	15	6th
2013	Porsche Carrera Cup Japan	Garmin Porsche	10	2	1	4	6	103	6th
2013	JAF Formula 4 West	Succeed Sports	6	4	0	0	6	95	**1st**
2013	JAF Formula 4 Japan Championship – FC	Succeed Sports	1	0	0	0	1	N/A	**2nd**
2013	JAF Grand Prix	Succeed Sports	1	0	0	0	1	N/A	**2nd**
2015	F4 Japanese Championship	Succeed Sports	14	0	0	0	0	27	13th
2016	F4 Japanese Championship	Succeed Sports	14	2	2	1	2	78	9th
2017	Super GT – GT300	Team Upgarage with Bandoh	8	0	0	0	0	6	20th
2018	Super GT – GT300	Team Taisan	7	0	0	0	0	2	21st
2018	Super Taikyu – ST-X	J-Fly Racing by Phoenix Racing Asia	5	0	0	1	1	71‡	5th‡
2019	Super Taikyu – ST-Z	Techno First	1	0	0	0	1	16‡	5th‡
2020	Super GT – GT300	Audi Team Hitotsuyama	8	1	0	0	1	29	11th
2020	Super Taikyu – ST-TCR	Floral Racing with Uematsu	5	2	2	1	5	104‡	**1st‡**
2021	Super GT – GT300	Audi Team Hitotsuyama	8	1	0	0	1	20	15th
2021	Super Taikyu – ST-X	Floral Racing with ABSSA	6	1	1	1	4	108.5‡	**2nd‡**
2022	Super GT – GT300	Team LeMans	1	0	0	0	0	0	NC
2022	Super GT – GT300	Pacific CarGuy Racing	1	0	0	0	0	0	NC
2022	Super Taikyu – ST-Q	Endless Sports	9	6	??	??	??	??‡	??‡
2023	Super GT – GT300	Pacific Racing Team	4	0	0	0	0	0	NC
2023	GT World Challenge Asia	Team 5ZIGEN	6	0	0	0	2	33	19th
2023	GT World Challenge Asia – Silver-Am	Team 5ZIGEN	6	0	0	0	2	33	19th
2023	Super Taikyu – ST-X	Team 5ZIGEN	2	1	1	2	1	36‡	7th‡
2023	Super Taikyu – ST-Z	Audi Team Hitotsuyama	1	0	0	0	0	73‡	5th‡
2024	Super Taikyu – ST-Z	Hitotsuyama Racing	7	0	0	0	1	75‡	6th‡
2025	SRO Japan Cup – GT3	Hitotsuyama Racing with Cornes Racing	8	1	1	0	6	122	**1st**
2025	Super Taikyu – ST-X	Hitotsuyama Racing	1	0	0	0	1	58.5‡	5th‡
2026	SRO Japan Cup – GT3	Hitotsuyama Racing with Cornes Racing	8	4	4	0	5	135	**1st**
2026	Super GT – GT300	Ponos Racing	6	0	1	1	0	49	11th

‡ Team standings

=== Complete Formula Challenge Japan results ===
(key) (Races in bold indicate pole position) (Races in italics indicate fastest lap)

Year	Team	1	2	3	4	5	6	7	8	9	10	11	12	13	14	DC	Pts
2011	FTRS Scholarship	FUJ1; 1; 14	FUJ1; 2; 7	SUZ1; 1; 14	SUZ1; 2; 16	FUJ2; 1; 14	FUJ2; 2 Ret	FUJ2; 3; 13	SUZ2; C	SUZ3; 1 Ret	SUZ3; 2; 16	MOT; 1; 9	MOT; 2; 5	MOT; 3; 11	MOT; 4 DNS	12th	2
2012	FTRS Scholarship	FUJ1; 1 Ret	FUJ1; 2; 6	MOT; 1 Ret	MOT; 2; 6	FUJ2; 1; 7	FUJ2; 2; 17	FUJ2; 3; 6	SUZ1; 1; 5	SUZ1; 2; 16	SUZ2; 1; 7	SUZ2; 2; 3	SUZ2; 3; 3			6th	15

=== Complete F4 Japanese Championship results ===
(key) (Races in bold indicate pole position) (Races in italics indicate fastest lap)

Year	Team	1	2	3	4	5	6	7	8	9	10	11	12	13	14	DC	Pts
2015	Succeed Sports	OKA; 1; 15	OKA; 2 Ret	FUJ1; 1; 5	FUJ1; 2; 10	FUJ2; 1; 11	FUJ2; 2; 13	SUZ; 1; 28	SUZ; 2; 11	SUG; 1; 14	SUG; 2; 11	AUT; 1; 15	AUT; 2; 11	MOT; 1; 4	MOT; 2; 5	13th	27
2016	Succeed Sports	**OKA**; **1**; 1	**OKA**; **2**; 1	FUJ1; 1 Ret	FUJ1; 2 Ret	SUG; 1 Ret	SUG; 2; 6	FUJ2; 1; 28	FUJ2; 2; 8	FUJ2; 3; 6	SUZ; 1; 12	SUZ; 2; 8	MOT; 1; 15	MOT; 2; 26	MOT; 3; 8	9th	78

=== Complete Super GT results ===
Year	Team	Car	Class	1	2	3	4	5	6	7	8	DC	Pts
2017	Team Up Garage with Bandoh	Toyota 86	GT300	OKA; 12	FUJ; 9	AUT; Ret	SUG; 17	FUJ; 11	SUZ; 15	CHA; 7	MOT; 16	20th	6
2018	Team Taisan	Audi R8 LMS	GT300	OKA; 9	FUJ; 15	SUZ; 28	CHA	FUJ; Ret	SUG; 20	AUT; 20	MOT; 16	21st	2
2020	Audi Sport Team Hitotsuyama	Audi R8 LMS Evo	GT300	FUJ; 17	FUJ; 8	SUZ; 25	MOT; 5	FUJ; 14	SUZ; 1	MOT; 13	FUJ; 12	11th	29
2021	Audi Sport Team Hitotsuyama	Audi R8 LMS Evo	GT300	OKA; 13	FUJ; 17	MOT; 16	SUZ; 21	SUG; 25	AUT; 15	MOT; 1	FUJ; 17	15th	20
2022	Team LeMans	Audi R8 LMS Evo II	GT300	OKA	FUJ; 14	SUZ						NC	0
2022	Pacific Car Guy Racing	Ferrari 488 GT3 Evo 2020	GT300				FUJ; 12	SUZ	SUG	AUT	MOT	NC	0
2023	Pacific Racing Team	Mercedes-AMG GT3 Evo	GT300	OKA	FUJ; WD	SUZ; 25	FUJ; 22	SUZ; 11	SUG	AUT; 23	MOT	NC	0
2026	PONOS Racing	Ferrari 296 GT3 Evo	GT300	OKA	FUJ	**FUJ**; 4	SUZ; 15	SUG; 11	AUT; 6	MOT; 4	MOT; 10	11th	49

=== Complete GT World Challenge Asia results ===
(key) (Races in bold indicate pole position) (Races in italics indicate fastest lap)

Year	Team	Car	Class	1	2	3	4	5	6	7	8	9	10	11	12	DC	Points
2023	Team 5ZIGEN	Nissan GT-R Nismo GT3	Pro-Am	BUR; 1	BUR; 2	FUJ; 1; 23	FUJ; 2 Ret	SUZ; 1; 2	SUZ; 2; 24	MOT; 1	MOT; 2	OKA; 1; 3	OKA; 2; 11	SEP; 1	SEP; 2	19th	33
