= D'station Racing =

Japanese racing team

(Japan) D'station Racing
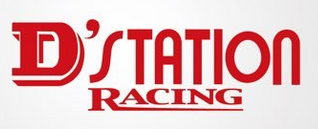
- Founded: 2013
- Base: Oyama, Shizuoka Prefecture
- Team principal(s): Tomonobu Fujii
- Founder(s): Satoshi Hoshino
- Current series: Super GT; FIA World Endurance Championship LMGT3; GT World Challenge Asia; Super Taikyu; Asian Le Mans Series
- Former series: Porsche Carrera Cup Japan; Asian Le Mans Series; Super Taikyu; FIA World Endurance Championship LMGT3
- Current drivers: Super GT: (Japan) Tomonobu Fujii; (United Kingdom) Charlie Fagg; Super Taikyu: (Japan) Satoshi Hoshino; (Japan) Tomonobu Fujii; (Japan) Yuta Kamimura; GT World Challenge Asia: (Japan) Tomonobu Fujii; (Japan) Satoshi Hoshino
- Teams' Championships: Super Taikyu - ST-X (2021); Super Taikyu - ST-1 (2016, 2018-2019)
- Website: dstation-racing.jp

NEXUS Holdings Co., Ltd. is a Japanese racing team who runs D'station Racing that competes in Super GT, FIA World Endurance Championship LMGT3, GT World Challenge Asia, Super Taikyu, and Asian Le Mans Series. The team's workshop is located in Oyama, across from Ponos Racing and close to Fuji Speedway.

== History ==
=== Japan & Asia ===
D'station Racing was founded in 2013 by Satoshi Hoshino (no relation to Kazuyoshi Hoshino). Hoshino is the President & CEO of Nexus where the company runs Pachinko halls in Japan as well as fitness clubs, restaurants, convenience stores, onsen and child daycare centers. Before the inception of the team, D'station sponsored Kondo Racing in Super GT.

D'station Racing competed first time in Porsche Carrera Cup Japan. Then expanded into Super Taikyu in 2016. D'station Racing made their debut in Super GT in 2017 with Tomonobu Fujii who is the current Team Managing Director of the team till now alongside Sven Müller, and some rounds replacing Müller are André Couto & Yuya Motojima. They run Porsche 911 GT3-R on their maiden Super GT GT300 race, and first season both claimed couple of podiums in 2 seasons. The team also competed in Blancpain GT Series Asia, racing with Porsche 911 GT3 R alongside Team President Hoshino & Seiji Ara

For 2019, D'station Racing change their manufacturer from Porsche to Aston Martin. Fujii raced with Aston Martin Vantage AMR GT3 alongside João Paulo de Oliveira who just got dropped from Nissan For 2020, the team competed with Pacific Racing together alongside originally Nicki Thiim but scrapped due to COVID-19 Pandemic. Kei Cozzolino & Takuro Shinohara raced on some rounds alongside Fujii. The team leaves the series after 2020 where they focus main on FIA World Endurance Championship. In 2022, D'station returns racing in GT World Challenge Asia for Japan Cup only with Fujii Hoshino pairing.

D'station Racing returns to Super GT for 2024, with Fujii and Sørensen as the drivers.

=== FIA World Endurance Championship & Le Mans ===
D'station made their first appearance in FIA World Endurance Championship on 2018. They raced under LMGTE Am Class, the team run under Dempsey-Proton Racing name with Hoshino, Matteo Cairoli & Giorgio Roda where they only competed in the Fuji 6 Hours. The pair made first debut in Le Mans 24 Hours in 2019 where they claimed pole. Hoshino paired with Adrien De Leener and Thomas Preining for one round only at Fuji round again.

D'station Racing made their full season debut in 2021, where the team run by TF Sport, with Tomonobu Fujii & Satoshi Hoshino as the main driver for many years to come, and also Andrew Watson. For 2022, Fujii, Hoshino paired with Charlie Fagg. For 2023, with Casper Stevenson. After change in regulations & TF Sports change manufacturer to Chevrolet Corvette, 2024 D'station Racing continues to run under Aston Martin banner with Aston Martin Vantage AMR GT3 Evo as the new car. Marco Sorensen is the new driver for the team alongside Erwan Bastard and Clement Mateu.

D'station stopped their participation for WEC 2025.

== Racing record ==
=== 24 Hours of Le Mans results ===
| Year | Entrant | Team | No. | Car | Drivers | Class | Laps | Pos. | Class Pos. |
|---|---|---|---|---|---|---|---|---|---|
| 2019 | (Germany) Dempsey-Proton Racing | Proton Competition | 88 | Porsche 911 RSR | (Italy) Matteo Cairoli (Japan) Satoshi Hoshino (Italy) Giorgio Roda | LMGTE Am | 79 | DNF | DNF |
| 2021 | (Japan) D'station Racing | TF Sport | 777 | Aston Martin Vantage AMR | (Japan) Tomonobu Fujii (Japan) Satoshi Hoshino (United Kingdom) Andrew Watson | LMGTE Am | 333 | 33rd | 6th |
| 2022 | (Japan) D'station Racing | TF Sport | 777 | Aston Martin Vantage AMR | (United Kingdom) Charlie Fagg (Japan) Tomonobu Fujii (Japan) Satoshi Hoshino | LMGTE Am | 112 | DNF | DNF |
| 2023 | (Japan) D'station Racing | TF Sport | 777 | Aston Martin Vantage AMR | (Japan) Tomonobu Fujii (Japan) Satoshi Hoshino (United Kingdom) Casper Stevenson | LMGTE Am | 163 | DNF | DNF |
| 2024 | (Japan) D'station Racing | Aston Martin Racing | 777 | Aston Martin Vantage AMR GT3 Evo | (France) Erwan Bastard (Japan) Satoshi Hoshino (Denmark) Marco Sørensen | LMGT3 | 279 | 36th | 9th |
