= K-tunes Racing =

Japanese racing team

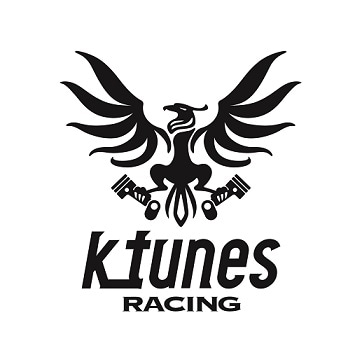
- Founded: 2013
- Base: Kurashiki, Okayama Prefecture
- Team principal(s): Masahiko Kageyama
- Current series: Super GT GT300; GT World Challenge Asia-Japan Cup
- Current drivers: Super GT GT300: Morio Nitta; Shinichi Takagi; GT World Challenge Asia-Japan Cup: Morio Nitta; Shinichi Takagi; Kazunori Suenaga; Daisuke Yamawaki; Masahiko Kageyama; Yoshichika Nagai
- Website: www.oktp.jp/ktunesracing

K-tunes Racing is a racing team based in Kurashiki, Okayama Prefecture, Japan, run by Okayama Toyopet.

== History ==
Toyota car dealership Okayama Toyopet founded K-tunes Racing in 2013. The team was named after the Kurashiki GR Garage, taking the "K" with the word "tunes" to indicate car tuning.

In 2018, the team competed in the GT300 class of Super GT with a Lexus RC F GT3. The car number was 96, the drivers were Morio Nitta and Toyota factory driver Yuichi Nakayama, and they used Bridgestone tires. They had a collaboration with LM Corsa to operate the team, competing in a joint system with three teams, with Inging Motorsport in charge of vehicle maintenance. They won two races, and Nitta gained the record for the most wins in a row, which had been previously held by Shinichi Takagi. For 2019, they recruited Sena Sakaguchi as Nitta's co-driver, and changed the team management to a system where the team is operated solely by the company, while Inging continued to be in charge of vehicle maintenance. They won the opening race in Okayama and the third race in Suzuka, and finished the season in second place in the driver/team rankings, their best result since the team's founding.

In 2020, the team changed its tire manufacturer to Dunlop and became independent by carrying out in-house vehicle maintenance. After a strong performance the previous year, the team finished the season winless with only two points finishes. In 2021, Sakaguchi competed in the GT500 class as a replacement for Sacha Fenestraz for a couple of rounds, with Hibiki Taira replacing Sakaguchi for those rounds. Shinichi Takagi replaced Sakaguchi, who was promoted to the GT500 class. Nitta and Takagi were reunited for the first time in 12 years, having been teammates at ARTA until 2010.

K-tunes Racing also made their debut in GT World Challenge Asia in 2022, with Nitta and Masanori Nogami in the Lexus RC F GT3 for the fifth round. They returned for the Japan Cup in 2023 with Kazunori Suenaga replacing Nogami. They also entered a GT4 Toyota Supra with Hiromitsu Fujii and Masanori Nogami. In 2024, the team expanded their entry with an additional car, the Ferrari 296 GT3 driven by Takagi and Daisuke Yamawaki.
