= 2023 Super Taikyu Series =

Japanese sports car racing season

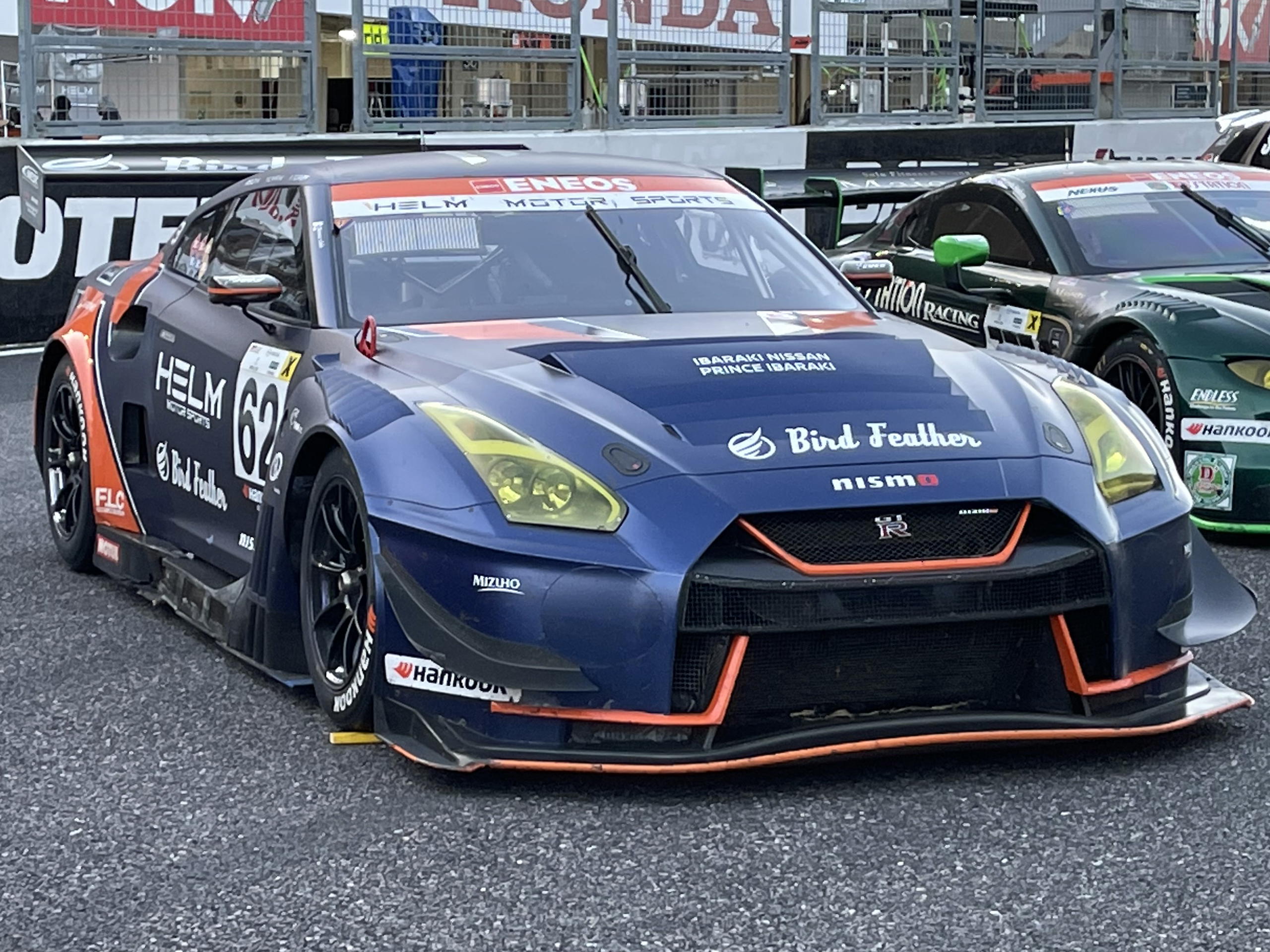
HELM Motorsports' Nissan GT-R NISMO GT3 won the previous year's ST-X class championship.

The 2023 Eneos Super Taikyu Series Supported by Bridgestone (previously the Eneos Super Taikyu Series Powered by Hankook) was the thirty-third season of the Super Taikyu Series endurance racing championship. The season started on 19 March at Suzuka Circuit and ended on 12 November at Fuji Speedway.

Zhongsheng ROOKIE Racing won the championship in the series' GT3 category, known as ST-X, with a Mercedes-AMG GT3.

A specially designed Toyota GR Corolla running on liquid hydrogen fuel made its debut at the NAPAC Fuji SUPER TEC 24 Hours Race on 27–28 May.

== Calendar ==
The Super Taikyu Series announced their provisional 2023 calendar on 24 October 2022, with seven rounds held at the six major Japanese racing circuits. The final round of the season was moved from Suzuka Circuit to Fuji Speedway. Before the start of the season, the sixth round at Okayama International Circuit was moved from 15 October to 22 October to avoid a clash with the Super GT Series' race at Autopolis, and the seventh round at Fuji was moved from 19 November to 12 November, to avoid a clash with the World Rally Championship Rally Japan.

Round	Event	Race Length	Race Format	Classes	Circuit	Date
1	Suzuka Super Taikyu 5 Hours Race	5 hours	1 race	All	Suzuka Circuit	18–19 March
2	NAPAC Fuji SUPER TEC 24 Hours Race	24 hours	1 race	All	Fuji Speedway	26–28 May
3	SUGO Super Taikyu 3 Hours Race	3 hours	2 races	ST-X / Z / TCR / Q / 1 / 2 / 4 / 5	Sportsland Sugo	8–9 July
4	Super Taikyu Race in Autopolis	5 hours	1 race	ST-X / Z / TCR / Q / 2 / 3 / 5	Autopolis	29–30 July
5	Motegi Super Taikyu 5 Hours Race	5 hours	1 race	ST-X / Z / TCR / Q / 1 / 2 / 3 / 4	Mobility Resort Motegi	2–3 September
6	Super Taikyu Race in Okayama	3 hours x 2	2 races	ST-X / Z / TCR / Q / 1 / 3 / 4 / 5	Okayama International Circuit	21–22 October
7	S-Tai Final Fuji 4 Hours Race with Fuji Niq Festival	4 hours	1 race	All	Fuji Speedway	11–12 November

== Tyres ==
Hankook entered 2023 in the final year of a three-year contract as the Super Taikyu Series' official tyre supplier. On 12 March, a fire at Hankook's plant in Daejeon forced the company to halt all production at the facility, including the production of tyres supplied to Super Taikyu.

Bridgestone agreed to become the new tyre supplier to the series with immediate effect on 24 April, just 12 days after signing a new three-year deal to become the series' new tyre supplier in 2024. At the NAPAC Fuji SUPER TEC 24 Hours Race, most teams were supplied with Bridgestone slick tyres and the remaining stock of wet tyres from Hankook. This excluded ST-4 and ST-5 class entries, and select ST-Q cars, which used Bridgestone high-performance street tyres instead of slicks. Bridgestone would then supply wet racing tyres from the third round onwards.

At the fourth round in Autopolis, it was confirmed that the ST-4, ST-5, and select ST-Q cars would continue to race on Bridgestone street tyres for the remainder of 2023.

== Teams and drivers ==
On 19 February, the Super Taikyu Series published their provisional full-season entry list, featuring 62 entries. 61 different cars entered throughout the course of the season.

=== ST-X ===
Team	Car	Engine	No.	Drivers	Rounds
(Japan) HELM Motorsports	Nissan GT-R Nismo GT3	Nissan 3.8 L twin-turbocharged V6	1	(Japan) Yutaka Toriba	All
(Japan) HELM Motorsports	Nissan GT-R Nismo GT3	Nissan 3.8 L twin-turbocharged V6	1	(Japan) Yuya Hiraki	All
(Japan) HELM Motorsports	Nissan GT-R Nismo GT3	Nissan 3.8 L twin-turbocharged V6	1	(Japan) Reiji Hiraki	All
(Japan) HELM Motorsports	Nissan GT-R Nismo GT3	Nissan 3.8 L twin-turbocharged V6	1	(United Kingdom) Jann Mardenborough	2
(Japan) HELM Motorsports	Nissan GT-R Nismo GT3	Nissan 3.8 L twin-turbocharged V6	1	(Hong Kong) Shaun Thong	2
(Japan) Zhongsheng ROOKIE Racing	Mercedes-AMG GT3 Evo	Mercedes-AMG M159 6.2 L V8	14	(Japan) Ryuta Ukai	All
(Japan) Zhongsheng ROOKIE Racing	Mercedes-AMG GT3 Evo	Mercedes-AMG M159 6.2 L V8	14	(Japan) Hibiki Taira	All
(Japan) Zhongsheng ROOKIE Racing	Mercedes-AMG GT3 Evo	Mercedes-AMG M159 6.2 L V8	14	(Japan) Naoya Gamou	All
(Japan) Zhongsheng ROOKIE Racing	Mercedes-AMG GT3 Evo	Mercedes-AMG M159 6.2 L V8	14	(Japan) Tatsuya Kataoka	All
(Japan) TKRI	Mercedes-AMG GT3 Evo	Mercedes-AMG M159 6.2 L V8	23	(Japan) Daisuke	1, 3–7
(Japan) TKRI	Mercedes-AMG GT3 Evo	Mercedes-AMG M159 6.2 L V8	23	(Japan) Yuya Motojima	1, 3–7
(Japan) TKRI	Mercedes-AMG GT3 Evo	Mercedes-AMG M159 6.2 L V8	23	(Japan) Yuhki Nakayama	1, 3–7
(Japan) apr	Lexus RC F GT3	Toyota 2UR 5.0 L V8	31	(Japan) Koki Saga	All
(Japan) apr	Lexus RC F GT3	Toyota 2UR 5.0 L V8	31	(Japan) Kazuto Kotaka	All
(Japan) apr	Lexus RC F GT3	Toyota 2UR 5.0 L V8	31	(Japan) Hideki Nagai	1–2
(Japan) apr	Lexus RC F GT3	Toyota 2UR 5.0 L V8	31	(Japan) Hiroaki Nagai	2–7
(Japan) apr	Lexus RC F GT3	Toyota 2UR 5.0 L V8	31	(Japan) Yuichi Nakayama	2
(Japan) apr	Lexus RC F GT3	Toyota 2UR 5.0 L V8	31	(Japan) Yuta Kamimura	2
(Japan) GTNET Motor Sports	Nissan GT-R Nismo GT3	Nissan 3.8 L twin-turbocharged V6	81	(Japan) Kiyoto Fujinami	4–7
(Japan) GTNET Motor Sports	Nissan GT-R Nismo GT3	Nissan 3.8 L twin-turbocharged V6	81	(Japan) Takayuki Aoki	4–7
(Japan) GTNET Motor Sports	Nissan GT-R Nismo GT3	Nissan 3.8 L twin-turbocharged V6	81	(Japan) Natsu Sakaguchi	4–7
(Japan) GTNET Motor Sports	Nissan GT-R Nismo GT3	Nissan 3.8 L twin-turbocharged V6	81	(Japan) Nobuyuki Oyagi	4–7
(Japan) GTNET Motor Sports	Nissan GT-R Nismo GT3	Nissan 3.8 L twin-turbocharged V6	819	(Japan) Kiyoto Fujinami	1–2
(Japan) GTNET Motor Sports	Nissan GT-R Nismo GT3	Nissan 3.8 L twin-turbocharged V6	819	(Japan) Takayuki Aoki	1–2
(Japan) GTNET Motor Sports	Nissan GT-R Nismo GT3	Nissan 3.8 L twin-turbocharged V6	819	(Japan) Natsu Sakaguchi	1–2
(Japan) GTNET Motor Sports	Nissan GT-R Nismo GT3	Nissan 3.8 L twin-turbocharged V6	819	(Japan) Joe Shindo	1–2
(Japan) GTNET Motor Sports	Nissan GT-R Nismo GT3	Nissan 3.8 L twin-turbocharged V6	819	(Japan) Nobuyuki Oyagi	2
(Hong Kong) KCMG	Honda NSX GT3 Evo22	Honda 3.5 L Turbo V6	202	(Hong Kong) Paul Ip	All
(Hong Kong) KCMG	Honda NSX GT3 Evo22	Honda 3.5 L Turbo V6	202	(China) Ho-Pin Tung	All
(Hong Kong) KCMG	Honda NSX GT3 Evo22	Honda 3.5 L Turbo V6	202	(Hong Kong) Marchy Lee	All
(Hong Kong) KCMG	Honda NSX GT3 Evo22	Honda 3.5 L Turbo V6	202	(Italy) Edoardo Liberati	2
(Hong Kong) KCMG	Honda NSX GT3 Evo22	Honda 3.5 L Turbo V6	202	(Australia) Josh Burdon	2
(Japan) Team 5ZIGEN	Nissan GT-R Nismo GT3	Nissan 3.8 L twin-turbocharged V6	500	(Japan) Hirobon	1, 6
(Japan) Team 5ZIGEN	Nissan GT-R Nismo GT3	Nissan 3.8 L twin-turbocharged V6	500	(Japan) Shintaro Kawabata	1, 6
(Japan) Team 5ZIGEN	Nissan GT-R Nismo GT3	Nissan 3.8 L twin-turbocharged V6	500	(Japan) Yu Kanamaru	1, 6
(Japan) Team 5ZIGEN	Nissan GT-R Nismo GT3	Nissan 3.8 L twin-turbocharged V6	500	(Japan) Yusuke Shiotsu	1
(Japan) D'station Racing	Aston Martin Vantage AMR GT3	Aston Martin 4.0 L Turbo V8	777	(Japan) Tatsuya Hoshino	7
(Japan) D'station Racing	Aston Martin Vantage AMR GT3	Aston Martin 4.0 L Turbo V8	777	(Japan) Tsubasa Kondo	7
(Japan) D'station Racing	Aston Martin Vantage AMR GT3	Aston Martin 4.0 L Turbo V8	777	(Japan) Kenji Hama	7
(Japan) D'station Racing	Aston Martin Vantage AMR GT3	Aston Martin 4.0 L Turbo V8	777	(Australia) Jake Parsons	7

=== ST-Z ===
The ST-Z class use SRO GT4 homologated vehicles

Team	Car	Engine	No.	Drivers	Rounds
(Japan) Birth Racing Project 【BRP】	Porsche 718 Cayman GT4 RS Clubsport	Porsche 4.0 L Flat-6	19	(Japan) Kenji Suzuki	All
(Japan) Birth Racing Project 【BRP】	Porsche 718 Cayman GT4 RS Clubsport	Porsche 4.0 L Flat-6	19	(Japan) Takeshi Suehiro	All
(Japan) Birth Racing Project 【BRP】	Porsche 718 Cayman GT4 RS Clubsport	Porsche 4.0 L Flat-6	19	(Japan) Kohei Fukuda	All
(Japan) Birth Racing Project 【BRP】	Porsche 718 Cayman GT4 RS Clubsport	Porsche 4.0 L Flat-6	19	(Japan) Tatsuya Tanigawa	All
(Japan) Birth Racing Project 【BRP】	Porsche 718 Cayman GT4 RS Clubsport	Porsche 4.0 L Flat-6	19	(Japan) Anna Inotsume	2
(Japan) Birth Racing Project 【BRP】	Porsche 718 Cayman GT4 RS Clubsport	Porsche 4.0 L Flat-6	19	(Japan) Hirobon	2
(Japan) Naniwa Denso Team Impul	Nissan Z Nismo GT4	Nissan VR30DDTT 3.0 L Twin-Turbo V6	20	(Japan) Yuki Tanaka	All
(Japan) Naniwa Denso Team Impul	Nissan Z Nismo GT4	Nissan VR30DDTT 3.0 L Twin-Turbo V6	20	(Japan) Kazuki Oki	All
(Japan) Naniwa Denso Team Impul	Nissan Z Nismo GT4	Nissan VR30DDTT 3.0 L Twin-Turbo V6	20	(Japan) Kazuki Hiramine	1–4, 6–7
(Japan) Naniwa Denso Team Impul	Nissan Z Nismo GT4	Nissan VR30DDTT 3.0 L Twin-Turbo V6	20	(Japan) Kazuki Hoshino	1–4, 6–7
(Japan) Naniwa Denso Team Impul	Nissan Z Nismo GT4	Nissan VR30DDTT 3.0 L Twin-Turbo V6	20	(Japan) Keishi Ishikawa	2, 5
(Japan) Naniwa Denso Team Impul	Nissan Z Nismo GT4	Nissan VR30DDTT 3.0 L Twin-Turbo V6	20	(Japan) Kazuki Nakajima	2
(Japan) Audi Team Hitotsuyama	Audi R8 LMS GT4 Evo	Audi 5.2 L V10	21	(Japan) Daisuke Yamawaki	All
(Japan) Audi Team Hitotsuyama	Audi R8 LMS GT4 Evo	Audi 5.2 L V10	21	(United Kingdom) Sean Walkinshaw	All
(Japan) Audi Team Hitotsuyama	Audi R8 LMS GT4 Evo	Audi 5.2 L V10	21	(Japan) Seiya Jin	1–3
(Japan) Audi Team Hitotsuyama	Audi R8 LMS GT4 Evo	Audi 5.2 L V10	21	(Japan) Yuki Ano	1–2, 4–5, 7
(Japan) Audi Team Hitotsuyama	Audi R8 LMS GT4 Evo	Audi 5.2 L V10	21	(Japan) Yuki Fujii	2
(Japan) Audi Team Hitotsuyama	Audi R8 LMS GT4 Evo	Audi 5.2 L V10	21	(Japan) Shinichi Takagi	2
(Japan) Audi Team Hitotsuyama	Audi R8 LMS GT4 Evo	Audi 5.2 L V10	21	(Japan) Shintaro Kawabata	4
(Japan) Audi Team Hitotsuyama	Audi R8 LMS GT4 Evo	Audi 5.2 L V10	21	(Japan) Ritomo Miyata	5–7
(Japan) Porsche Team EBI	Porsche 718 Cayman GT4 RS Clubsport	Porsche 4.0 L Flat-6	22	(Japan) Katsumasa Chiyo	1–3, 5–7
(Japan) Porsche Team EBI	Porsche 718 Cayman GT4 RS Clubsport	Porsche 4.0 L Flat-6	22	(Japan) Naoya Yamano	1–3, 5–7
(Japan) Porsche Team EBI	Porsche 718 Cayman GT4 RS Clubsport	Porsche 4.0 L Flat-6	22	(Japan) Shota Kitazono	1–3, 5, 7
(Japan) Porsche Team EBI	Porsche 718 Cayman GT4 RS Clubsport	Porsche 4.0 L Flat-6	22	(Japan) Kizuna	2–3, 6
(Japan) Porsche Team EBI	Porsche 718 Cayman GT4 RS Clubsport	Porsche 4.0 L Flat-6	22	(Japan) Satoshi Motoyama	2
(Japan) Porsche Team EBI	Porsche 718 Cayman GT4 RS Clubsport	Porsche 4.0 L Flat-6	22	(France) Giuliano Alesi	2
(Japan) Team ZeroOne	Nissan Z Nismo GT4	Nissan VR30DDTT 3.0 L Twin-Turbo V6	26	(Japan) Ryuichiro Otsuka	All
(Japan) Team ZeroOne	Nissan Z Nismo GT4	Nissan VR30DDTT 3.0 L Twin-Turbo V6	26	(Japan) Ryuichiro Tomita	All
(Japan) Team ZeroOne	Nissan Z Nismo GT4	Nissan VR30DDTT 3.0 L Twin-Turbo V6	26	(Japan) Teppei Natori	All
(Japan) Team ZeroOne	Nissan Z Nismo GT4	Nissan VR30DDTT 3.0 L Twin-Turbo V6	26	(Japan) Takuro Shinohara	1–2, 4–5, 7
(Japan) Team ZeroOne	Nissan Z Nismo GT4	Nissan VR30DDTT 3.0 L Twin-Turbo V6	26	(Japan) Masataka Yanagida	2
(Japan) Techno First	Audi R8 LMS GT4 Evo	Audi 5.2 L V10	34	(Japan) Masaki Kano	All
(Japan) Techno First	Audi R8 LMS GT4 Evo	Audi 5.2 L V10	34	(Japan) Riki Okusa	All
(Japan) Techno First	Audi R8 LMS GT4 Evo	Audi 5.2 L V10	34	(Japan) Hironobu Yasuda	All
(Japan) Techno First	Audi R8 LMS GT4 Evo	Audi 5.2 L V10	34	(Japan) Tadasuke Makino	2–3
(Japan) Techno First	Audi R8 LMS GT4 Evo	Audi 5.2 L V10	34	(Japan) Masami Kageyama	2
(Japan) Techno First	Audi R8 LMS GT4 Evo	Audi 5.2 L V10	34	(Japan) Ryoma Henzan	7
(Japan) Saitama Toyopet GreenBrave	Toyota GR Supra GT4	BMW B58B30 3.0 L Twin-Turbo I6	52	(Japan) Manabu Yamazaki	All
(Japan) Saitama Toyopet GreenBrave	Toyota GR Supra GT4	BMW B58B30 3.0 L Twin-Turbo I6	52	(Japan) Kohta Kawaai	All
(Japan) Saitama Toyopet GreenBrave	Toyota GR Supra GT4	BMW B58B30 3.0 L Twin-Turbo I6	52	(Japan) Hiroki Yoshida	All
(Japan) Saitama Toyopet GreenBrave	Toyota GR Supra GT4	BMW B58B30 3.0 L Twin-Turbo I6	52	(Japan) Naoki Hattori	All
(Japan) Saitama Toyopet GreenBrave	Toyota GR Supra GT4	BMW B58B30 3.0 L Twin-Turbo I6	52	(Japan) Seita Nonaka	2
(Japan) Team Noah	Toyota GR Supra GT4	BMW B58B30 3.0 L Twin-Turbo I6	75	(Japan) Yoshikazu Sobu	1–2, 4–7
(Japan) Team Noah	Toyota GR Supra GT4	BMW B58B30 3.0 L Twin-Turbo I6	75	(Japan) Toshiro Tsukada	1–2, 4
(Japan) Team Noah	Toyota GR Supra GT4	BMW B58B30 3.0 L Twin-Turbo I6	75	(Japan) Yuji Kiyotaki	1, 5
(Japan) Team Noah	Toyota GR Supra GT4	BMW B58B30 3.0 L Twin-Turbo I6	75	(Japan) Shingo Wada	1,6
(Japan) Team Noah	Toyota GR Supra GT4	BMW B58B30 3.0 L Twin-Turbo I6	75	(Japan) Yasuhiro Ogushi	2, 4
(Japan) Team Noah	Toyota GR Supra GT4	BMW B58B30 3.0 L Twin-Turbo I6	75	(Japan) Kuniyuki Haga	2, 5
(Japan) Team Noah	Toyota GR Supra GT4	BMW B58B30 3.0 L Twin-Turbo I6	75	(Japan) Kazuya Oshima	2, 6
(Japan) Team Noah	Toyota GR Supra GT4	BMW B58B30 3.0 L Twin-Turbo I6	75	(Japan) Yu Kanamaru	2
(Japan) Team Noah	Toyota GR Supra GT4	BMW B58B30 3.0 L Twin-Turbo I6	75	(Japan) Masataka Kubo	4
(Japan) Team Noah	Toyota GR Supra GT4	BMW B58B30 3.0 L Twin-Turbo I6	75	(Japan) Tatsuya Okahara	5
(Japan) Team Noah	Toyota GR Supra GT4	BMW B58B30 3.0 L Twin-Turbo I6	75	(Thailand) Nattavude Charoensukhawatana	7
(Japan) Team Noah	Toyota GR Supra GT4	BMW B58B30 3.0 L Twin-Turbo I6	75	(Thailand) Nattapong Hortongkum	7
(Japan) Team Noah	Toyota GR Supra GT4	BMW B58B30 3.0 L Twin-Turbo I6	75	(Thailand) Grant Supaphongs	7
(Japan) Buzz Kota Racing	McLaren 570S GT4 (Rd. 1, 3); Mercedes-AMG GT4 (Rd. 6–7)	McLaren 3.8 L Turbo V8 (Rd. 1, 3); Mercedes-AMG M178 4.0 L V8 (Rd. 6–7)	111	(Japan) Kota Sasaki	1, 3, 6
(Japan) Buzz Kota Racing	McLaren 570S GT4 (Rd. 1, 3); Mercedes-AMG GT4 (Rd. 6–7)	McLaren 3.8 L Turbo V8 (Rd. 1, 3); Mercedes-AMG M178 4.0 L V8 (Rd. 6–7)	111	(Japan) "Ken Alex"	1, 3
(Japan) Buzz Kota Racing	McLaren 570S GT4 (Rd. 1, 3); Mercedes-AMG GT4 (Rd. 6–7)	McLaren 3.8 L Turbo V8 (Rd. 1, 3); Mercedes-AMG M178 4.0 L V8 (Rd. 6–7)	111	(Japan) Kazutaka Tokufuji	1, 6–7
(Japan) Buzz Kota Racing	McLaren 570S GT4 (Rd. 1, 3); Mercedes-AMG GT4 (Rd. 6–7)	McLaren 3.8 L Turbo V8 (Rd. 1, 3); Mercedes-AMG M178 4.0 L V8 (Rd. 6–7)	111	(Japan) Ryosuke Kagami	1
(Japan) Buzz Kota Racing	McLaren 570S GT4 (Rd. 1, 3); Mercedes-AMG GT4 (Rd. 6–7)	McLaren 3.8 L Turbo V8 (Rd. 1, 3); Mercedes-AMG M178 4.0 L V8 (Rd. 6–7)	111	(Japan) Naoto Uzuka	3, 6–7
(Japan) Buzz Kota Racing	McLaren 570S GT4 (Rd. 1, 3); Mercedes-AMG GT4 (Rd. 6–7)	McLaren 3.8 L Turbo V8 (Rd. 1, 3); Mercedes-AMG M178 4.0 L V8 (Rd. 6–7)	111	(Finland) Max Salo	3, 6–7
(Japan) Buzz Kota Racing	McLaren 570S GT4 (Rd. 1, 3); Mercedes-AMG GT4 (Rd. 6–7)	McLaren 3.8 L Turbo V8 (Rd. 1, 3); Mercedes-AMG M178 4.0 L V8 (Rd. 6–7)	111	(Japan) Hikaru Jitosho	7
(Japan) Auto Factory	Mercedes-AMG GT4	Mercedes-AMG M178 4.0 L V8	555	(Japan) Jun Tashiro	1–2, 5, 7
(Japan) Auto Factory	Mercedes-AMG GT4	Mercedes-AMG M178 4.0 L V8	555	(Japan) Shigehiro Ikemoto	1–2, 5, 7
(Japan) Auto Factory	Mercedes-AMG GT4	Mercedes-AMG M178 4.0 L V8	555	(Japan) Kazutaka Tokufuji	2
(Japan) SHADE Racing	Toyota GR Supra GT4	BMW B58B30 3.0 L Twin-Turbo I6	885	(Japan) Hiro Hayashi	All
(Japan) SHADE Racing	Toyota GR Supra GT4	BMW B58B30 3.0 L Twin-Turbo I6	885	(Japan) Katsuyuki Hiranaka	All
(Japan) SHADE Racing	Toyota GR Supra GT4	BMW B58B30 3.0 L Twin-Turbo I6	885	(Japan) Eijiro Shimizu	All
(Japan) SHADE Racing	Toyota GR Supra GT4	BMW B58B30 3.0 L Twin-Turbo I6	885	(Japan) Morio Nitta	2
(Japan) SHADE Racing	Toyota GR Supra GT4	BMW B58B30 3.0 L Twin-Turbo I6	885	(Japan) Yuhki Nakayama	2

=== ST-TCR ===
The ST-TCR class use TCR homologated vehicles

Team	Car	No.	Drivers	Rounds
(Japan) AI' Racing	Honda Civic Type R TCR (FK7)	5	(Japan) Kazuhiro Sakai	4–7
(Japan) AI' Racing	Honda Civic Type R TCR (FK7)	5	(Japan) Shion Tsujimoto	4–7
(Japan) AI' Racing	Honda Civic Type R TCR (FK7)	5	(Japan) Masato Mitsuhashi	4
(Japan) AI' Racing	Honda Civic Type R TCR (FK7)	5	(Japan) Masaaki Fujii	5,7
(Japan) AI' Racing	Honda Civic Type R TCR (FK7)	5	(Japan) Ren Sato	5
(Japan) M&K Racing	Honda Civic Type R TCR (FK5)	97	(Japan) Mitsuhiro Endo	4–7
(Japan) M&K Racing	Honda Civic Type R TCR (FK5)	97	(Japan) Tosei Moriyama	4–5
(Japan) M&K Racing	Honda Civic Type R TCR (FK5)	97	(Japan) Yusuke Mitsui	4
(Japan) M&K Racing	Honda Civic Type R TCR (FK5)	97	(Japan) Shinji Nakano	5
(Japan) M&K Racing	Honda Civic Type R TCR (FK5)	97	(Japan) Takashi Kobayashi	7

=== ST-Q ===
The ST-Q class use development vehicles approved by the STO

Team	Car	No.	Drivers	Rounds
(Japan) Mazda Spirit Racing	Mazda Roadster (NDERC) CNF Concept	12	(Japan) Ryohei Sakaguchi	4–7
(Japan) Mazda Spirit Racing	Mazda Roadster (NDERC) CNF Concept	12	(Japan) Yuui Tsutsumi	4–7
(Japan) Mazda Spirit Racing	Mazda Roadster (NDERC) CNF Concept	12	(Japan) Ikuo Maeda	4–7
(Japan) Mazda Spirit Racing	Mazda3 Bio Concept	55	(Japan) Kazuhiro Terakawa	1–2, 4–7
(Japan) Mazda Spirit Racing	Mazda3 Bio Concept	55	(Japan) Yutaka Seki	1–2, 4–7
(Japan) Mazda Spirit Racing	Mazda3 Bio Concept	55	(Japan) Kaoru Ijiri	1–2, 4–7
(Japan) Mazda Spirit Racing	Mazda3 Bio Concept	55	(Japan) Ikuo Maeda	1–2
(Japan) Mazda Spirit Racing	Mazda3 Bio Concept	55	(Japan) Ryohei Sakaguchi	2
(Japan) Mazda Spirit Racing	Mazda3 Bio Concept	55	(Japan) Yuui Tsutsumi	2
(Japan) ORC ROOKIE Racing	Toyota GR86 CNF Concept	28	(Japan) Keizo Kato	1–5, 7
(Japan) ORC ROOKIE Racing	Toyota GR86 CNF Concept	28	(Japan) Daisuke Toyoda	1–5, 7
(Japan) ORC ROOKIE Racing	Toyota GR86 CNF Concept	28	(Japan) Eisuke Sasaki	1–3
(Japan) ORC ROOKIE Racing	Toyota GR86 CNF Concept	28	(Japan) Kazuya Oshima	1–2, 4–5, 7
(Japan) ORC ROOKIE Racing	Toyota GR86 CNF Concept	28	(Japan) Kenta Yamashita	2–5, 7
(Japan) ORC ROOKIE Racing	Toyota GR86 CNF Concept	28	(Japan) Yuhi Sekiguchi	2
(Japan) ORC ROOKIE Racing	Toyota GR Yaris (Rd.1, 3); Toyota GR Corolla H2 Concept (Rd. 2, 4, 7); Toyota GR Yaris DAT Concept (Rd. 5)	32	(Japan) "Morizo"	All
(Japan) ORC ROOKIE Racing	Toyota GR Yaris (Rd.1, 3); Toyota GR Corolla H2 Concept (Rd. 2, 4, 7); Toyota GR Yaris DAT Concept (Rd. 5)	32	(Japan) Masahiro Sasaki	All
(Japan) ORC ROOKIE Racing	Toyota GR Yaris (Rd.1, 3); Toyota GR Corolla H2 Concept (Rd. 2, 4, 7); Toyota GR Yaris DAT Concept (Rd. 5)	32	(Japan) Hiroaki Ishiura	All
(Japan) ORC ROOKIE Racing	Toyota GR Yaris (Rd.1, 3); Toyota GR Corolla H2 Concept (Rd. 2, 4, 7); Toyota GR Yaris DAT Concept (Rd. 5)	32	(Japan) Yasuhiro Ogura	All
(Japan) ORC ROOKIE Racing	Toyota GR Yaris (Rd.1, 3); Toyota GR Corolla H2 Concept (Rd. 2, 4, 7); Toyota GR Yaris DAT Concept (Rd. 5)	32	(Finland) Jari-Matti Latvala	2
(Japan) Team SDA Engineering	Subaru BRZ CNF Concept	61	(Japan) Kazuhiro Ito	1–3, 5–7
(Japan) Team SDA Engineering	Subaru BRZ CNF Concept	61	(Japan) Hideki Yamauchi	1–3, 5–7
(Japan) Team SDA Engineering	Subaru BRZ CNF Concept	61	(Japan) Takuto Iguchi	1–3, 5–7
(Japan) Team SDA Engineering	Subaru BRZ CNF Concept	61	(Japan) Koichi Hirota	1–3, 5–7
(Japan) Team SDA Engineering	Subaru BRZ CNF Concept	61	(Japan) Kota Sasaki	2
(Japan) Team SDA Engineering	Subaru BRZ CNF Concept	61	(Japan) Takuma Kamada	2
(Japan) NISMO	Nissan Z Racing Concept	230	(Japan) Kohei Hirate	2, 5
(Japan) NISMO	Nissan Z Racing Concept	230	(Japan) Daiki Sasaki	2, 5
(Japan) NISMO	Nissan Z Racing Concept	230	(Japan) Mitsunori Takaboshi	2, 5
(Japan) NISMO	Nissan Z Racing Concept	230	(Japan) Tsugio Matsuda	2
(Japan) Team HRC	Honda Civic Type R CNF Concept	271	(Japan) Hideki Mutoh	2–7
(Japan) Team HRC	Honda Civic Type R CNF Concept	271	(Japan) Takuya Izawa	2–7
(Japan) Team HRC	Honda Civic Type R CNF Concept	271	(Japan) Hiroki Otsu	2–7
(Japan) Team HRC	Honda Civic Type R CNF Concept	271	(Japan) Syun Koide	2

=== ST–1 to ST–5 ===
Team	Car	No.	Drivers	Rounds
ST–1
(Japan) K's Frontier KTM Cars	KTM X-Bow GTX	2	(Japan) Taiyo Ida	1–3, 5–7
(Japan) K's Frontier KTM Cars	KTM X-Bow GTX	2	(Japan) Hiroki Katoh	1–3, 5–7
(Japan) K's Frontier KTM Cars	KTM X-Bow GTX	2	(Japan) Kazuho Takahashi	1–3, 5–7
(Japan) K's Frontier KTM Cars	KTM X-Bow GTX	2	(Japan) Hiroki Yoshimoto	1–3, 5–7
(Japan) K's Frontier KTM Cars	KTM X-Bow GTX	2	(Japan) Takashi Kobayashi	2
(Japan) D'station Racing	Aston Martin Vantage GT8R	47	(Japan) Manabu Orido	1–3, 5–7
(Japan) D'station Racing	Aston Martin Vantage GT8R	47	(Japan) Tatsuya Hoshino	1–3, 5–6
(Japan) D'station Racing	Aston Martin Vantage GT8R	47	(Japan) Kenji Hama	1–3, 5–6
(Japan) D'station Racing	Aston Martin Vantage GT8R	47	(Australia) Jake Parsons	1–3, 5–6
(Japan) D'station Racing	Aston Martin Vantage GT8R	47	(Japan) Tsubasa Kondo	2
(Japan) D'station Racing	Aston Martin Vantage GT8R	47	(United Kingdom) Casper Stevenson	2
(Japan) D'station Racing	Aston Martin Vantage GT8R	47	(Japan) Nobuteru Taniguchi	7
ST–2 (2,400-3,500cc, front-wheel and all-wheel drive)
(Japan) Shinryo Racing Team	Mitsubishi Lancer Evolution X (CZ4A)	6	(Japan) Tomohiro Tomimasu	1–5, 7
(Japan) Shinryo Racing Team	Mitsubishi Lancer Evolution X (CZ4A)	6	(Japan) Yasushi Kikuchi	1–5, 7
(Japan) Shinryo Racing Team	Mitsubishi Lancer Evolution X (CZ4A)	6	(Japan) Masazumi Ohashi	1–5, 7
(Japan) Shinryo Racing Team	Mitsubishi Lancer Evolution X (CZ4A)	6	(Japan) Hitoshi Gotoh	2
(Japan) Shinryo Racing Team	Mitsubishi Lancer Evolution X (CZ4A)	6	(Japan) Takahiro Matsuzawa	2
(Japan) Shinryo Racing Team	Mitsubishi Lancer Evolution X (CZ4A)	7	(Japan) Keisuke Anzai	1–5, 7
(Japan) Shinryo Racing Team	Mitsubishi Lancer Evolution X (CZ4A)	7	(Japan) Yoshiki Fujii	1–3, 5
(Japan) Shinryo Racing Team	Mitsubishi Lancer Evolution X (CZ4A)	7	(Japan) Masato Narisawa	1-3
(Japan) Shinryo Racing Team	Mitsubishi Lancer Evolution X (CZ4A)	7	(Japan) Kazuya Shimogaki	1-2, 4–5, 7
(Japan) Shinryo Racing Team	Mitsubishi Lancer Evolution X (CZ4A)	7	(Japan) Kazunari Yoshioka	2, 4–5, 7
(Japan) Shinryo Racing Team	Mitsubishi Lancer Evolution X (CZ4A)	7	(Japan) Tatsuya Usui	2
(Japan) Endless Sports	Toyota GR Yaris (GXPA16)	13	(Japan) Masaya Hanazato	1–5, 7
(Japan) Endless Sports	Toyota GR Yaris (GXPA16)	13	(Japan) Mizuki Ishizaka	1–5, 7
(Japan) Endless Sports	Toyota GR Yaris (GXPA16)	13	(Japan) Reimei Ito	1–5, 7
(Japan) Endless Sports	Toyota GR Yaris (GXPA16)	13	(Japan) Hitoshi Okada	1–5, 7
(Japan) Kobe Toyopet Motor Sports	Toyota GR Yaris (GXPA16)	225	(Japan) Kengo Ichijo	1–5, 7
(Japan) Kobe Toyopet Motor Sports	Toyota GR Yaris (GXPA16)	225	(Japan) Rin Arakawa	1–5, 7
(Japan) Kobe Toyopet Motor Sports	Toyota GR Yaris (GXPA16)	225	(Japan) Jiei Okuzumi	1–5, 7
(Japan) Kobe Toyopet Motor Sports	Toyota GR Yaris (GXPA16)	225	(Japan) Shunji Okumoto	1–5, 7
(Japan) Honda R&D Challenge	Honda Civic Type R (FL5)	743	(Japan) Hiroaki Ishigaki	1–5, 7
(Japan) Honda R&D Challenge	Honda Civic Type R (FL5)	743	(Japan) Junichi Kidachi	1–5, 7
(Japan) Honda R&D Challenge	Honda Civic Type R (FL5)	743	(Japan) Hideki Kakinuma	1–3, 5
(Japan) Honda R&D Challenge	Honda Civic Type R (FL5)	743	(Japan) Hideki Mutoh	1
(Japan) Honda R&D Challenge	Honda Civic Type R (FL5)	743	(Japan) Shinichi Katsura	2
(Japan) Honda R&D Challenge	Honda Civic Type R (FL5)	743	(Japan) Tetsumei Mochizuki	2
(Japan) Honda R&D Challenge	Honda Civic Type R (FL5)	743	(Japan) Tensho Kobayashi	4–5, 7
ST-3 (2,400-3,500cc, rear-wheel drive)
(Japan) Okabe Jidosha Motorsport	Nissan Fairlady Z (Z34)	15	(Japan) Masaya Kohno	1–2, 4–7
(Japan) Okabe Jidosha Motorsport	Nissan Fairlady Z (Z34)	15	(Japan) Masaaki Nagashima	1–2, 4–7
(Japan) Okabe Jidosha Motorsport	Nissan Fairlady Z (Z34)	15	(Japan) Aruga Tomita	1–2, 4–7
(Japan) Okabe Jidosha Motorsport	Nissan Fairlady Z (Z34)	15	(Japan) Seiya Motojima	1–2, 4–7
(Japan) Okabe Jidosha Motorsport	Nissan Fairlady Z (Z34)	15	(Finland) Max Salo	2
(Japan) Okabe Jidosha Motorsport	Nissan Fairlady Z (Z34)	15	(Japan) Yuya Nakajima	2
(Japan) Okabe Jidosha Motorsport	Nissan Fairlady Z (Z34)	16	(Japan) Hirokazu Suzuki	1–2, 4–7
(Japan) Okabe Jidosha Motorsport	Nissan Fairlady Z (Z34)	16	(Japan) Toru Tanaka	1–2, 4–7
(Japan) Okabe Jidosha Motorsport	Nissan Fairlady Z (Z34)	16	(Japan) Tetsuya Tanaka	1–2, 4–7
(Japan) Okabe Jidosha Motorsport	Nissan Fairlady Z (Z34)	16	(Japan) Kazuomi Komatsu	1–2, 4–7
(Japan) Okabe Jidosha Motorsport	Nissan Fairlady Z (Z34)	16	(Japan) Atsushi Miyake	2
(Japan) Okabe Jidosha Motorsport	Nissan Fairlady Z (Z34)	16	(Japan) Tsubasa Mekaru	2
(Japan) Team ZeroOne	Nissan Fairlady Z (Z34)	25	(Japan) Kimiya Sato	1–5, 7
(Japan) Team ZeroOne	Nissan Fairlady Z (Z34)	25	(Japan) Daiki Fujiwara	1–5, 7
(Japan) Team ZeroOne	Nissan Fairlady Z (Z34)	25	(Japan) Tsugio Matsuda	1, 5, 7
(Japan) Team ZeroOne	Nissan Fairlady Z (Z34)	25	(Japan) Genki Nishimura	1–2
(Japan) Team ZeroOne	Nissan Fairlady Z (Z34)	25	(Japan) Seiji Ara	2, 4, 7
(Japan) Team ZeroOne	Nissan Fairlady Z (Z34)	25	(Japan) Kota Matsui	2
(Japan) Team ZeroOne	Nissan Fairlady Z (Z34)	25	(Japan) Tomohide Yamaguchi	4-5
(Japan) Tracy Sports with Delta	Lexus RC 350 (GSC10)	38	(Japan) Shunsuke Ozaki	1–2, 4–7
(Japan) Tracy Sports with Delta	Lexus RC 350 (GSC10)	38	(Japan) Yoshiyuki Tsuruga	1–2, 4–7
(Japan) Tracy Sports with Delta	Lexus RC 350 (GSC10)	38	(Japan) Toshiki Ishimori	1–2, 4–7
(Japan) Tracy Sports with Delta	Lexus RC 350 (GSC10)	38	(Japan) Takanobu Ishizuka	2, 4–7
(Japan) Tracy Sports with Delta	Lexus RC 350 (GSC10)	38	(Japan) Sesshu Kondo	2
(Japan) Tracy Sports with Delta	Lexus RC 350 (GSC10)	39	(Japan) Takumi Sanada	1–5, 7
(Japan) Tracy Sports with Delta	Lexus RC 350 (GSC10)	39	(Japan) Takashi Itoh	1–5, 7
(Japan) Tracy Sports with Delta	Lexus RC 350 (GSC10)	39	(Japan) Mamoru Okada	1–2, 4–6
(Japan) Tracy Sports with Delta	Lexus RC 350 (GSC10)	39	(Japan) Shinya Fujita	2, 5–7
(Japan) Tracy Sports with Delta	Lexus RC 350 (GSC10)	39	(Japan) Kazuaki Yasui	2
(Japan) Tracy Sports with Delta	Lexus RC 350 (GSC10)	39	(Japan) Yoshinari Fujiwara	2
(Japan) Tracy Sports with Delta	Lexus RC 350 (GSC10)	39	(Japan) Yusuke Tomibayashi	4
ST-4 (1,500-2,500cc)
(Japan) Endless Sports	Toyota GR86 (ZN8)	3	(Japan) Hiroyuki Saka	1–3, 5–7
(Japan) Endless Sports	Toyota GR86 (ZN8)	3	(Japan) Ryo Ogawa	1–3, 5–7
(Japan) Endless Sports	Toyota GR86 (ZN8)	3	(Japan) Togo Suganami	1–3, 5–7
(Japan) Endless Sports	Toyota GR86 (ZN8)	3	(Japan) Yuya Motojima	2
(Japan) Asano Racing Service	Toyota GR86 (ZN8)	18	(Japan) Takeo Asano	1–3, 5–7
(Japan) Asano Racing Service	Toyota GR86 (ZN8)	18	(Japan) Shinnosuke Ito	1–3, 5–7
(Japan) Asano Racing Service	Toyota GR86 (ZN8)	18	(Japan) Ryotaro Sawai	1–2
(Japan) Asano Racing Service	Toyota GR86 (ZN8)	18	(Japan) Kazumi Mikami	2, 6–7
(Japan) Asano Racing Service	Toyota GR86 (ZN8)	18	(Japan) Shoya Suzuki	2, 7
(Japan) Asano Racing Service	Toyota GR86 (ZN8)	18	(Japan) Kazunori Nishimura	2
(Japan) Asano Racing Service	Toyota GR86 (ZN8)	18	(Japan) Daiki Fujiwara	3
(Japan) Asano Racing Service	Toyota GR86 (ZN8)	18	(Japan) Ryo Fukatsu	5
(Japan) Tracy Sports with Delta	Toyota GR86 (ZN8)	41	(Japan) Hirotaka Ishii	1–3, 5–7
(Japan) Tracy Sports with Delta	Toyota GR86 (ZN8)	41	(Japan) Yusuke Tomibayashi	1–3, 5–7
(Japan) Tracy Sports with Delta	Toyota GR86 (ZN8)	41	(Japan) Dai Mizuno	1–3, 5–7
(Japan) Tracy Sports with Delta	Toyota GR86 (ZN8)	41	(Japan) Tomoaki Ichimori	2
(Japan) Team G/Motion'	Toyota GR86 (ZN8)	60	(Japan) Resshu Shioya	1–3, 5–7
(Japan) Team G/Motion'	Toyota GR86 (ZN8)	60	(Japan) Takao Seto	1–3, 5–7
(Japan) Team G/Motion'	Toyota GR86 (ZN8)	60	(Japan) Kengo Yamamoto	1–3, 5
(Japan) Team G/Motion'	Toyota GR86 (ZN8)	60	(Japan) Piston Nishizawa	2, 5
(Japan) Team G/Motion'	Toyota GR86 (ZN8)	60	(Japan) Toshihiro Kubota	2
(Japan) Team G/Motion'	Toyota GR86 (ZN8)	60	(Japan) Yohei Ono	7
(Japan) Over Drive	Mazda Roadster RF (NDERC)	66	(Japan) Kousei Kanto	1–3, 5–7
(Japan) Over Drive	Mazda Roadster RF (NDERC)	66	(Japan) Kyosuke Inomata	1–3, 5–7
(Japan) Over Drive	Mazda Roadster RF (NDERC)	66	(Japan) Takahisa Ohno	1–3, 5–7
(Japan) Over Drive	Mazda Roadster RF (NDERC)	66	(Japan) Ryohei Sakaguchi	1
(Japan) Over Drive	Mazda Roadster RF (NDERC)	66	(Japan) Shigetomo Shimono	2–3, 5
(Japan) Over Drive	Mazda Roadster RF (NDERC)	66	(Japan) Chihiro Inagaki	2, 7
(Japan) Over Drive	Mazda Roadster RF (NDERC)	66	(Japan) Tatsuya Osaki	2
(Japan) TOM'S Spirit	Toyota GR86 (ZN8)	86	(Japan) Hisashi Yabuki	1–3, 5–7
(Japan) TOM'S Spirit	Toyota GR86 (ZN8)	86	(Japan) Takamitsu Matsui	1–3, 5–7
(Japan) TOM'S Spirit	Toyota GR86 (ZN8)	86	(Japan) Shunsuke Kohno	1–3, 5–7
(Japan) TOM'S Spirit	Toyota GR86 (ZN8)	86	(Japan) Sho Tsuboi	1–3, 5–7
(Japan) HMR Racing	Toyota 86 (ZN6)	216	(Japan) Kenji Ishikawa	1, 3, 5–7
(Japan) HMR Racing	Toyota 86 (ZN6)	216	(Japan) Tomomitsu Senoo	1, 3, 5–7
(Japan) HMR Racing	Toyota 86 (ZN6)	216	(Japan) Yuki Kawahara	1, 3, 5, 7
(Japan) HMR Racing	Toyota 86 (ZN6)	216	(Japan) Takashi Nara	1, 5
(Japan) SHADE Racing	Toyota GR86 (ZN8)	884	(Japan) Masahiko Kageyama	1–3, 5–7
(Japan) SHADE Racing	Toyota GR86 (ZN8)	884	(Japan) Yuji Kunimoto	1–3, 5–7
(Japan) SHADE Racing	Toyota GR86 (ZN8)	884	(Japan) Shinnosuke Yamada	1–3, 5–7
(Japan) SHADE Racing	Toyota GR86 (ZN8)	884	(Japan) Teppei Tsuruta	1–3, 5–7
ST-5 (up to 1,500cc)
(Japan) Team Bride	Honda Fit3 RS (GK5) (Rd. 1–4); Honda Fit4 RS (GS4) (Rd. 6–7)	4	(Japan) Yuya Ohta	1–4, 6–7
(Japan) Team Bride	Honda Fit3 RS (GK5) (Rd. 1–4); Honda Fit4 RS (GS4) (Rd. 6–7)	4	(Japan) Kaoru Arai	1–4, 6–7
(Japan) Team Bride	Honda Fit3 RS (GK5) (Rd. 1–4); Honda Fit4 RS (GS4) (Rd. 6–7)	4	(Japan) Takuji Okada	1
(Japan) Team Bride	Honda Fit3 RS (GK5) (Rd. 1–4); Honda Fit4 RS (GS4) (Rd. 6–7)	4	(Japan) Shunya Ito	1
(Japan) Team Bride	Honda Fit3 RS (GK5) (Rd. 1–4); Honda Fit4 RS (GS4) (Rd. 6–7)	4	(Japan) Hiroshi Ito	2–4, 6–7
(Japan) Team Bride	Honda Fit3 RS (GK5) (Rd. 1–4); Honda Fit4 RS (GS4) (Rd. 6–7)	4	(Japan) Shunsuke Sato	2, 4
(Japan) Team Bride	Honda Fit3 RS (GK5) (Rd. 1–4); Honda Fit4 RS (GS4) (Rd. 6–7)	4	(Japan) Hiroki Kokuzawa	2
(Japan) Team Bride	Honda Fit3 RS (GK5) (Rd. 1–4); Honda Fit4 RS (GS4) (Rd. 6–7)	4	(Japan) Soichi Kurosu	2
(Japan) Team Bride	Honda Fit3 RS (GK5) (Rd. 1–4); Honda Fit4 RS (GS4) (Rd. 6–7)	4	(Japan) Hidefumi Minami	3, 6–7
(Japan) D.R.C EZO	Honda Fit3 RS (GK5)	11	(Japan) Hajime Omono	2–3, 7
(Japan) D.R.C EZO	Honda Fit3 RS (GK5)	11	(Japan) Katsuhiro Sato	2-3
(Japan) D.R.C EZO	Honda Fit3 RS (GK5)	11	(Japan) Motoharu Sato	2, 7
(Japan) D.R.C EZO	Honda Fit3 RS (GK5)	11	(Japan) Ryoji Tashiro	2, 7
(Japan) D.R.C EZO	Honda Fit3 RS (GK5)	11	(Japan) Ryohei Oshima	2, 7
(Japan) D.R.C EZO	Honda Fit3 RS (GK5)	11	(Japan) Carlos Honda	2
(Japan) D.R.C EZO	Honda Fit3 RS (GK5)	11	(Japan) Kenta Kawafuku	3
(Japan) Team NOPRO	Mazda Demio Diesel Turbo (DJ5FS)	17	(Japan) Hideyoshi Nishizawa	1–4, 6–7
(Japan) Team NOPRO	Mazda Demio Diesel Turbo (DJ5FS)	17	(Japan) Tobio Ohtani	1–4, 6–7
(Japan) Team NOPRO	Mazda Demio Diesel Turbo (DJ5FS)	17	(Japan) Misaki Konishi	1–4, 6–7
(Japan) Team NOPRO	Mazda Demio Diesel Turbo (DJ5FS)	17	(Japan) Toshihiko Nogami	1–4, 6–7
(Japan) Team NOPRO	Mazda Demio Diesel Turbo (DJ5FS)	17	(Japan) Hiroaki Yamamoto	2
(Japan) Team NOPRO	Mazda Demio Diesel Turbo (DJ5FS)	17	(Japan) Junichi Agematsu	2
(Japan) Team NOPRO	Mazda Demio (DE5FS)	37	(Japan) Yoshihiro Kato	1–4, 6–7
(Japan) Team NOPRO	Mazda Demio (DE5FS)	37	(Japan) Tatsuya Nogami	1–4, 6–7
(Japan) Team NOPRO	Mazda Demio (DE5FS)	37	(Japan) Suguru Kawana	1, 4, 6–7
(Japan) Team NOPRO	Mazda Demio (DE5FS)	37	(Japan) Johnny Ogura	2–4, 6–7
(Japan) Team NOPRO	Mazda Demio (DE5FS)	37	(Japan) Masataka Inoue	2
(Japan) Team NOPRO	Mazda Demio (DE5FS)	37	(Japan) Kenichi Obara	3
(Japan) Love Drive Racing	Mazda Roadster (ND5RC)	50	(Japan) Takashi Ohi	1–3, 6–7
(Japan) Love Drive Racing	Mazda Roadster (ND5RC)	50	(Japan) Junko Fujii	1–3, 6–7
(Japan) Love Drive Racing	Mazda Roadster (ND5RC)	50	(Japan) Isao Ihashi	1–3, 6
(Japan) Love Drive Racing	Mazda Roadster (ND5RC)	50	(Japan) Mitsuhiro Kunisawa	1–3, 7
(Japan) Love Drive Racing	Mazda Roadster (ND5RC)	50	(Japan) Futoshi Someya	2, 7
(Japan) Love Drive Racing	Mazda Roadster (ND5RC)	50	(Japan) Takafumi Katsuki	2
(Japan) Over Drive	Mazda Roadster (ND5RC)	65	(Japan) Shuichiro Hokazono	1–4, 6–7
(Japan) Over Drive	Mazda Roadster (ND5RC)	65	(Japan) Tatsuya Ota	1–4, 6–7
(Japan) Over Drive	Mazda Roadster (ND5RC)	65	(Japan) Hirohito Ito	1–4, 6–7
(Japan) Over Drive	Mazda Roadster (ND5RC)	65	(Japan) Eiji Niwa	1–2, 7
(Japan) Over Drive	Mazda Roadster (ND5RC)	65	(Japan) Sena Kuronuma	2–4
(Japan) Over Drive	Mazda Roadster (ND5RC)	65	(Japan) Kyohei Kawamura	2
(Japan) Over Drive	Mazda Roadster (ND5RC)	65	(Japan) Takayuki Takechi	6
(Japan) Team Yamato	Honda Fit3 RS (GK5)	67	(Japan) Shinya Uchiyama	1–3, 6–7
(Japan) Team Yamato	Honda Fit3 RS (GK5)	67	(Japan) Ryohei Yasui	1–3, 6–7
(Japan) Team Yamato	Honda Fit3 RS (GK5)	67	(Japan) Hideaki Ito	2, 7
(Japan) Team Yamato	Honda Fit3 RS (GK5)	67	(Japan) Ryo Mukumoto	2, 7
(Japan) Team Yamato	Honda Fit3 RS (GK5)	67	(Japan) Yoshihiko Nakamura	3
(Japan) Nihon Automobile College	Mazda Roadster (ND5RC)	72	(Japan) Tetsuya Yamano	1–4, 6–7
(Japan) Nihon Automobile College	Mazda Roadster (ND5RC)	72	(Japan) Makoto Kanai	1–4, 6–7
(Japan) Nihon Automobile College	Mazda Roadster (ND5RC)	72	(Japan) Tatsuya Nojima	1–4, 6–7
(Japan) Nihon Automobile College	Mazda Roadster (ND5RC)	72	(Japan) Takumi Minamisawa	2
(Japan) Nihon Automobile College	Mazda Roadster (ND5RC)	72	(Japan) Tatsuya Okahara	2
(Japan) Nihon Automobile College	Mazda Roadster (ND5RC)	72	(Japan) Tatsuya Ishii	2
(Japan) Murakami Motors	Mazda Roadster (ND5RC)	88	(Japan) Hiroyuki Murakami	1–4, 6–7
(Japan) Murakami Motors	Mazda Roadster (ND5RC)	88	(Japan) Soichiro Yoshida	1–4, 6–7
(Japan) Murakami Motors	Mazda Roadster (ND5RC)	88	(Japan) Ryohei Arioka	1–4, 6–7
(Japan) Murakami Motors	Mazda Roadster (ND5RC)	88	(Japan) Daichi Okamoto	1–3, 6–7
(Japan) Murakami Motors	Mazda Roadster (ND5RC)	88	(Japan) Keiji Amemiya	2
(Japan) Access Racing Team	Toyota Vitz (NCP131)	110	(Japan) Toshiyuki Matsuda	1, 3–4, 6–7
(Japan) Access Racing Team	Toyota Vitz (NCP131)	110	(Japan) Tatsuki Maeda	1, 3–4, 6–7
(Japan) Access Racing Team	Toyota Vitz (NCP131)	110	(Japan) Shota Yanagihori	1, 3–4, 6–7
(Japan) Mazda Spirit Racing	Mazda Roadster (ND5RC)	120	(Japan) Haruhiko Sugino	1–4, 6
(Japan) Mazda Spirit Racing	Mazda Roadster (ND5RC)	120	(Japan) Tatsuya Minowa	1–3
(Japan) Mazda Spirit Racing	Mazda Roadster (ND5RC)	120	(Japan) Noriyuki Higuchi	1–2, 6
(Japan) Mazda Spirit Racing	Mazda Roadster (ND5RC)	120	(Japan) Shohei Oda	1–2, 7
(Japan) Mazda Spirit Racing	Mazda Roadster (ND5RC)	120	(Japan) Junji Ueda	2–3, 7
(Japan) Mazda Spirit Racing	Mazda Roadster (ND5RC)	120	(Japan) Ryoto Kikuchi	2, 7
(Japan) Mazda Spirit Racing	Mazda Roadster (ND5RC)	120	(Japan) Eiichi Honda	4, 6–7
(Japan) Mazda Spirit Racing	Mazda Roadster (ND5RC)	120	(Japan) Yuta Nakajima	4, 6
(Japan) Honda Cars Tokai	Honda Fit4 RS (GS4)	222	(Japan) Toshiki Takeuchi	1–4, 6–7
(Japan) Honda Cars Tokai	Honda Fit4 RS (GS4)	222	(Japan) Masayuki Sumi	1–4, 6–7
(Japan) Honda Cars Tokai	Honda Fit4 RS (GS4)	222	(Japan) Hajime Saimen	1–4
(Japan) Honda Cars Tokai	Honda Fit4 RS (GS4)	222	(Japan) Masaki Nishihata	2, 6–7
(Japan) Honda Cars Tokai	Honda Fit4 RS (GS4)	222	(Japan) Ryoji Matsumoto	2, 4
(Japan) AutoLabo	Toyota Yaris (MXPA10)	290	(Japan) Masayuki Minato	1–4, 6–7
(Japan) AutoLabo	Toyota Yaris (MXPA10)	290	(Japan) Yuichi Yokoo	1–4, 6–7
(Japan) AutoLabo	Toyota Yaris (MXPA10)	290	(Japan) Takeshi Kitagawa	1–3, 6–7
(Japan) AutoLabo	Toyota Yaris (MXPA10)	290	(Japan) Takashi Azuma	1
(Japan) AutoLabo	Toyota Yaris (MXPA10)	290	(Japan) Atsuhito Otomo	2–3
(Japan) AutoLabo	Toyota Yaris (MXPA10)	290	(Japan) Daisuke Ito	2
(Japan) AutoLabo	Toyota Yaris (MXPA10)	290	(Japan) Teiichiro Fukiya	2
(Japan) AutoLabo	Toyota Yaris (MXPA10)	290	(Japan) Tatsuki Furuta	4

== Race results ==
Round	Circuit	Race	ST-X Winners	ST-Z Winners	ST-TCR Winners	ST-Q Winners
1	Suzuka		No.500 Team 5Zigen	No.52 Saitama Toyopet GreenBrave	did not participate	No.61 Team SDA Engineering
1	Suzuka		(Japan) Hirobon (Japan) Shintaro Kawabata (Japan) Yusuke Shiotsu (Japan) Yu Kanamaru	(Japan) Manabu Yamazaki (Japan) Kohta Kawaai (Japan) Hiroki Yoshida (Japan) Naoki Hattori	did not participate	(Japan) Koichi Hirota (Japan) Takuto Iguchi (Japan) Hideki Yamauchi (Japan) Kazuhiro Ito
2	Fuji 24h		No.14 Zhongsheng ROOKIE Racing	No.52 Saitama Toyopet GreenBrave	did not participate	No.230 NISMO
2	Fuji 24h		(Japan) Ryuta Ukai (Japan) Naoya Gamou (Japan) Hibiki Taira (Japan) Tatsuya Kataoka	(Japan) Manabu Yamazaki (Japan) Kohta Kawaai (Japan) Hiroki Yoshida (Japan) Naoki Hattori (Japan) Seita Nonaka	did not participate	(Japan) Kohei Hirate (Japan) Daiki Sasaki (Japan) Mitsunori Takaboshi (Japan) Tsugio Matsuda
3	Sugo	Group 1	No.23 TKRI	No.52 Saitama Toyopet GreenBrave	did not participate	No.32 ORC ROOKIE Racing
3	Sugo	Group 1	(Japan) Daisuke (Japan) Yuya Motojima (Japan) Yuhki Nakayama	(Japan) Manabu Yamazaki (Japan) Kohta Kawaai (Japan) Hiroki Yoshida (Japan) Naoki Hattori	did not participate	(Japan) Morizo (Japan) Masahiro Sasaki (Japan) Hiroaki Ishiura (Japan) Yasuhiro Ogura
3	Sugo	Group 2	did not participate		did not participate	No.61 Team SDA Engineering
3	Sugo	Group 2	did not participate		did not participate	(Japan) Koichi Hirota (Japan) Takuto Iguchi (Japan) Hideki Yamauchi (Japan) Kazuhiro Ito
4	Autopolis		No.14 Zhongsheng ROOKIE Racing	No.885 SHADE Racing	No.97 M&K Racing	No.28 ORC ROOKIE Racing
4	Autopolis		(Japan) Ryuta Ukai (Japan) Naoya Gamou (Japan) Hibiki Taira (Japan) Tatsuya Kataoka	(Japan) Hiro Hayashi (Japan) Katsuyuki Hiranaka (Japan) Eijiro Shimizu	(Japan) Mitsuhiro Endo (Japan) Yusuke Mitsui (Japan) Tosei Moriyama	(Japan) Keizo Kato (Japan) Kenta Yamashita (Japan) Kazuya Oshima (Japan) Daisuke Toyoda
5	Motegi		No.31 apr	No.885 SHADE Racing	No.97 M&K Racing	No.230 NISMO
5	Motegi		(Japan) Hiroaki Nagai (Japan) Kazuto Kotaka (Japan) Koki Saga	(Japan) Hiro Hayashi (Japan) Katsuyuki Hiranaka (Japan) Eijiro Shimizu	(Japan) Mitsuhiro Endo (Japan) Shinji Nakano (Japan) Tosei Moriyama	(Japan) Kohei Hirate (Japan) Daiki Sasaki (Japan) Mitsunori Takaboshi
6	Okayama	Group 1	No.14 Zhongsheng ROOKIE Racing	No.34 Techno First	No.97 M&K Racing	No.271 Team HRC
6	Okayama	Group 1	(Japan) Ryuta Ukai (Japan) Naoya Gamou (Japan) Hibiki Taira (Japan) Tatsuya Kataoka	(Japan) Masaki Kano (Japan) Riki Okusa (Japan) Hironobu Yasuda	(Japan) Mitsuhiro Endo (Japan) Shinji Nakano	(Japan) Hideki Mutoh (Japan) Takuya Izawa (Japan) Hiroki Otsu
6	Okayama	Group 2	did not participate			No.55 Mazda Spirit Racing
6	Okayama	Group 2	did not participate			(Japan) Kazuhiro Terakawa (Japan) Kaoru Ijiri (Japan) Yutaka Seki
7	Fuji 4h		No.31 apr	No.52 Saitama Toyopet GreenBrave	no finishers	No.271 Team HRC
7	Fuji 4h		(Japan) Hiroaki Nagai (Japan) Kazuto Kotaka (Japan) Koki Saga	(Japan) Manabu Yamazaki (Japan) Kohta Kawaai (Japan) Hiroki Yoshida (Japan) Naoki Hattori	no finishers	(Japan) Hideki Mutoh (Japan) Takuya Izawa (Japan) Hiroki Otsu

Round	Circuit	Race	ST-1 Winners	ST-2 Winners	ST-3 Winners	ST-4 Winners	ST-5 Winners
1	Suzuka		No.47 D'station Racing	No.743 Honda R&D Challenge	No.15 Okabe Jidosha Motorsports	No.60 Team G/Motion'	No.88 Murakami Motors
1	Suzuka		(Japan) Tatsuya Hoshino (Japan) Manabu Orido (Japan) Kenji Hama (Australia) Jake Parsons	(Japan) Hiroaki Ishigaki (Japan) Hideki Mutoh (Japan) Junichi Kidachi (Japan) Hideki Kakinuma	(Japan) Masaya Kohno (Japan) Masaaki Nagashima (Japan) Aruga Tomita (Japan) Seiya Motojima	(Japan) Resshu Shioya (Japan) Kengo Yamamoto (Japan) Takao Seto	(Japan) Hiroyuki Murakami (Japan) Soichiro Yoshida (Japan) Ryohei Arioka (Japan) Daichi Okamoto
2	Fuji 24h		No.2 K's Frontier KTM Cars	No.13 Endless Sports	No.38 Tracy Sports with Delta	No.60 Team G/Motion'	No.17 Team NOPRO
2	Fuji 24h		(Japan) Taiyo Ida (Japan) Hiroki Katoh (Japan) Kazuho Takahashi (Japan) Hiroki Yoshimoto (Japan) Takashi Kobayashi	(Japan) Masaya Hanazato (Japan) Mizuki Ishizaka (Japan) Reimei Ito (Japan) Hitoshi Okada	(Japan) Shunsuke Ozaki (Japan) Yoshiyuki Tsuruga (Japan) Toshiki Ishimori (Japan) Sesshu Kondo (Japan) Takanobu Ishizuka	(Japan) Resshu Shioya (Japan) Kengo Yamamoto (Japan) Takao Seto (Japan) Piston Nishizawa (Japan) Toshihiro Kubota	(Japan) Hideyoshi Nishizawa (Japan) Tobio Ohtani (Japan) Misaki Konishi (Japan) Toshihiko Nogami (Japan) Hiroaki Yamamoto (Japan) Junichi Agematsu
3	Sugo	Group 1	No.2 K's Frontier KTM Cars	No.6 Shinryo Racing Team	did not participate		
3	Sugo	Group 1	(Japan) Taiyo Ida (Japan) Hiroki Katoh (Japan) Kazuho Takahashi (Japan) Hiroki Yoshimoto	(Japan) Tomohiro Tomimasu (Japan) Yasushi Kikuchi (Japan) Masazumi Ohashi	did not participate		
3	Sugo	Group 2	did not participate			No.3 Endless Sports	No.72 Nihon Automobile College
3	Sugo	Group 2	did not participate			(Japan) Hiroyuki Saka (Japan) Ryo Ogawa (Japan) Togo Suganami	(Japan) Tetsuya Yamano (Japan) Makoto Kanai (Japan) Tatsuya Nojima
4	Autopolis		did not participate	No.13 Endless Sports	No.16 Okabe Jidosha Motorsports	did not participate	No.72 Nihon Automobile College
4	Autopolis		did not participate	(Japan) Masaya Hanazato (Japan) Mizuki Ishizaka (Japan) Reimei Ito (Japan) Hitoshi Okada	(Japan) Hirokazu Suzuki (Japan) Toru Tanaka (Japan) Tetsuya Tanaka (Japan) Kazuomi Komatsu	did not participate	(Japan) Tetsuya Yamano (Japan) Makoto Kanai (Japan) Tatsuya Nojima
5	Motegi		No.2 K's Frontier KTM Cars	No.225 Kobe Toyopet Motorsports	No.25 Team ZeroOne	No.41 Tracy Sports with Delta	did not participate
5	Motegi		(Japan) Taiyo Ida (Japan) Hiroki Katoh (Japan) Kazuho Takahashi (Japan) Hiroki Yoshimoto	(Japan) Kengo Ichijo (Japan) Rin Arakawa (Japan) Jiei Okuzumi (Japan) Shunji Okumoto	(Japan) Tomohide Yamaguchi (Japan) Tsugio Matsuda (Japan) Kimiya Sato (Japan) Daiki Fujiwara	(Japan) Dai Mizuno (Japan) Yusuke Tomibayashi (Japan) Hirotaka Ishii	did not participate
6	Okayama	Group 1	No.2 K's Frontier KTM Cars	did not participate	did not participate		
6	Okayama	Group 1	(Japan) Taiyo Ida (Japan) Hiroki Katoh (Japan) Kazuho Takahashi (Japan) Hiroki Yoshimoto	did not participate	did not participate		
6	Okayama	Group 2	did not participate	did not participate	No.38 Tracy Sports with Delta	No.41 Tracy Sports with Delta	No.88 Murakami Motors
6	Okayama	Group 2	did not participate	did not participate	(Japan) Shunsuke Ozaki (Japan) Yoshiyuki Tsuruga (Japan) Toshiki Ishimori (Japan) Takanobu Ishizuka	(Japan) Dai Mizuno (Japan) Yusuke Tomibayashi (Japan) Hirotaka Ishii	(Japan) Hiroyuki Murakami (Japan) Soichiro Yoshida (Japan) Ryohei Arioka (Japan) Daichi Okamoto
7	Fuji 4h		No.47 D'station Racing	No.743 Honda R&D Challenge	No.39 Tracy Sports with Delta	No.86 TOM'S Spirit	No.72 Nihon Automobile College
7	Fuji 4h		(Japan) Manabu Orido (Japan) Nobuteru Taniguchi	(Japan) Hiroaki Ishigaki (Japan) Junichi Kidachi (Japan) Tensho Kobayashi	(Japan) Takumi Sanada (Japan) Takashi Itoh (Japan) Shinya Fujita	(Japan) Hisashi Yabuki (Japan) Takamitsu Matsui (Japan) Shunsuke Kohno (Japan) Sho Tsuboi	(Japan) Tetsuya Yamano (Japan) Makoto Kanai (Japan) Tatsuya Nojima

== Championship standings ==
Championship points are awarded in every class with the exception of ST-Q at the end of each event.

For the ST-X, ST-Z, and ST-TCR championships, each team's six highest scoring rounds are validated in the final championship standings.

Points systems
Duration	1st	2nd	3rd	4th	5th	6th	7th	8th	9th	10th	≤11th	Pole
3 Hours / 500 km	20	15	12	10	8	6	4	3	2	1	0	2
5 Hours / 700 km	30	22.5	18	15	12	9	6	4.5	3	1.5	1	2
≥12 Hours / 1400 km	45	35	27	23	18	13	9	7	5	3	1	2

Notes

- If the final round of the championship is less than five hours or 700 kilometres, 1.5 times the regular amount of points will be awarded.

=== Teams' Championship standings ===
Pos.	Car	Team	SUZ	24H	SUG	AUT	MRM	OIC	FSW	Points
ST-X
1	14	(Japan) Zhongsheng ROOKIE Racing	7	1	3	1	6	**1**	**3**	136
2	31	(Japan) apr	3	5	**5**	6	**1**	4	1	118
3	1	(Japan) HELM Motorsports	4	**4**	2	**2**	4	5	2	117
4	23	(Japan) TKRI	2		1	3	2	2	4	113
5	81/819	(Japan) GTNET Motor Sports	6	2	WD	4	3	6	5	95
6	202	(Hong Kong) KCMG	5	3	4	5	5	3	6	85
7	500	(Japan) Team 5Zigen	**1**					7		36
8	777	(Japan) D'station Racing							7	6
ST-Z
1	52	(Japan) Saitama Toyopet Green Brave	**1**	**1**	1	2	2	2	1	174
2	885	(Japan) SHADE Racing	3	3	Ret	**1**	1	3	2	141.5
3	34	(Japan) Techno First	7	4	6	3	4	**1**	4	99
4	26	(Japan) Team ZeroOne	2	9	**2**	4	3		Ret	77.5
5	21	(Japan) Audi Team Hitotsuyama	11	2	Ret	6	6	4	6	73
6	19	(Japan) Birth Racing Project 【BRP】	4	6	5	5	8	5	10	60.5
7	20	(Japan) Naniwa Denso Team Impul	5	8	3	8	5	Ret	5	59.5
8	22	(Japan) Porsche Team EBI Waimarama	6	7	4		**Ret**	Ret	**3**	50
9	75	(Japan) Team Noah	9	5		7	Ret	6	8	37.5
10	111	(Japan) Buzz Kota Racing	8		Ret	WD		7	7	14.5
11	555	(Japan) Auto Factory	10	Ret			7	WD	9	10.5
ST-TCR
1	97	(Japan) M&K Racing				**1**	**1**	**1**	**Ret**	88
2	5	(Japan) AI' Racing				2	Ret	2	Ret	37.5
ST-1
1	2	(Japan) K's Frontier KTM Cars	**2**	1	**1**		**1**	**1**	2	168
2	47	(Japan) D'station Racing	1	**2**	2		2	2	**1**	151.5
ST-2
2	743	(Japan) Honda R&D Challenge	1	3	3	3	4		1	132
1	13	(Japan) Endless Sports	2	1	2	1	3		NC	130.5
3	6	(Japan) Shinryo Racing Team	**Ret**	**2**	1	**2**	**5**		2	120
4	225	(Japan) Kobe Toyopet Motor Sports	4	4	**5**	Ret	1		**4**	95
5	7	(Japan) Shinryo Racing Team	3	Ret	4	Ret	2		3	68.5
ST-3
1	38	(Japan) Tracy Sports with Delta	3	1		**2**	5	**1**	3	139.5
2	39	(Japan) Tracy Sports with Delta	**2**	2		3	4	4	**1**	134.5
3	15	(Japan) Okabe Jidosha Motorsport	1	**3**		4	2	2	2	134
4	16	(Japan) Okabe Jidosha Motorsport	4	4		1	3	3	4	113
5	25	(Japan) Team ZeroOne	5	5		5	**1**		5	86
ST-4
1	41	(Japan) Tracy Sports with Delta	2	4	3		**1**	1	2	132
2	60	(Japan) Team G/Motion'	1	1	7		5	7	4	110
3	86	(Japan) TOM'S Spirit	3	Ret	2		2	2	1	100.5
4	18	(Japan) Asano Racing Service	4	3	6		6	5	3	83
5	66	(Japan) Over Drive	Ret	2	5		4	8	6	70
6	3	(Japan) Endless Sports	6	5	**1**		7	3	**DNS**	69
7	884	(Japan) SHADE Racing	**Ret**	**Ret**	4		3	**4**	5	56
8	216	(Japan) HMR Racing	5		8		Ret	6	7	27
ST-5
1	72	(Japan) Nihon Automobile College	4	2	**1**	1		2	**1**	149
2	17	(Japan) Team NOPRO	3	1	2	2		7	2	127
3	88	(Japan) Murakami Motors	**1**	11	4	**3**		**1**	3	103
4	65	(Japan) Over Drive	6	3	3	4		4	NC	73
5	4	(Japan) Team Bride	2	5	8	5		9	6	66.5
6	50	(Japan) Love Drive Racing	8	**4**	5			3	8	54
7	120	(Japan) Mazda Spirit Racing	5	6	7	9		5	Ret	40
8	110	(Japan) Access Racing Team	7		9	6		6	4	38
9	67	(Japan) Team Yamato	12	10	6			8	5	25
10	37	(Japan) Team NOPRO	11	8	10	7		11	7	21
11	11	(Japan) D.R.C EZO		7	13				9	12
12	290	(Japan) AutoLabo	9	9	11	Ret		Ret	11	9
13	222	(Japan) Honda Cars Tokai	10	NC	12	8		10	10	8.5
Pos.	Car	Team	SUZ	24H	SUG	AUT	MRM	OIC	FSW	Points

Colour	Result
Gold	Winner
Silver	Second place
Bronze	Third place
Green	Points classification
Blue	Non-points classification
Blue	Non-classified finish (NC)
Purple	Retired, not classified (Ret)
Red	Did not qualify (DNQ)
Red	Did not pre-qualify (DNPQ)
Black	Disqualified (DSQ)
White	Did not start (DNS)
White	Withdrew (WD)
White	Race cancelled (C)
Blank	Did not practice (DNP)
Blank	Did not arrive (DNA)
Blank	Excluded (EX)

**Bold** - Pole position

Italics - Fastest lap
