= 2011 Formula Challenge Japan =

Japanese formula racing season

The 2011 Formula Challenge Japan was a multi-event motor racing championship for open-wheel formula racing cars, and the sixth season of the Formula Challenge Japan racing series, a young driver development series jointly supported by Honda, Toyota, and Nissan. The championship featured a mix of manufacturer-affiliated drivers and independent entries, and commenced on 23 April and ended on 6 November. Three race weekends were run in support of Formula Nippon, with the October round at Suzuka being held in support of the Formula One Japanese Grand Prix.

Toyota junior Takamoto Katsuta won the championship by a five-point margin after winning three of the four races in the final round at Motegi, with fellow Toyota drivers Ryō Hirakawa and Kazuya Ishii coming second and third in the points standings. Kazuki Hiramine finished fourth as the highest Honda-supported driver after taking three wins and the championship lead early on. Nissan junior driver Tsubasa Kondō and Yūya Motojima completed the top six, who were the only drivers to take race wins or pole positions throughout the season.

== Teams and drivers ==
Team	No.	Driver	Rounds
FTRS Scholarship; FTRS Clarion FCJ; LUCK FTRS; FTRS FCJ; FTRS K-office FCJ	1	(Japan) Shintarō Kawabata	All
FTRS Scholarship; FTRS Clarion FCJ; LUCK FTRS; FTRS FCJ; FTRS K-office FCJ	4	(Japan) Ryō Hirakawa	All
FTRS Scholarship; FTRS Clarion FCJ; LUCK FTRS; FTRS FCJ; FTRS K-office FCJ	9	(Japan) Takamoto Katsuta	All
FTRS Scholarship; FTRS Clarion FCJ; LUCK FTRS; FTRS FCJ; FTRS K-office FCJ	10	(Japan) Hiroki Shinotani	All
FTRS Scholarship; FTRS Clarion FCJ; LUCK FTRS; FTRS FCJ; FTRS K-office FCJ	11	(Japan) Kazuya Ishii	All
FTRS Scholarship; FTRS Clarion FCJ; LUCK FTRS; FTRS FCJ; FTRS K-office FCJ	19	(Japan) Syunsuke Matsuzaki	All
HFDP/SRS-F/Kotira R HFDP/SRS-F/ARTA	2	(Japan) Shinnosuke Yamada	All
HFDP/SRS-F/Kotira R HFDP/SRS-F/ARTA	8	(Japan) Yūya Motojima	All
HFDP/SRS-F/Kotira R HFDP/SRS-F/ARTA	17	(Japan) Kazuki Hiramine	All
HFDP/SRS-F/Kotira R HFDP/SRS-F/ARTA	18	(Japan) Shōta Kiyohara	All
NDDP Maruso; NDDP FCJ	3	(Japan) Tsubasa Kondō	All
NDDP Maruso; NDDP FCJ	12	(Japan) Mitsunori Takaboshi	All
NDDP Maruso; NDDP FCJ	16	(China) Zhu Daiwei	All
Dream Max FCJ	5	(Japan) Kōhei Sutō	All
Meikyō 602 Palm Town Garage	6	(Japan) Kunihiro Iwatsuki	All
Houka Racing with Dunlop	7	(Japan) Ryo Ogawa	All
AsT Team SBT	13	(Japan) Ryūnosuke Shibata	All
Wings Garage	14	(Japan) Takanori Yamabe	All
ALT Team Naoki	15	(Japan) Keishi Niki	All

== Race calendar and results ==
All races were held in Japan. Rounds 3–4, 9, and 8–14 were run in support of the Formula Nippon Championship, and Rounds 11–12 were held as support races for the 2011 Japanese Grand Prix, a round of the 2011 Formula One World Championship.

Rounds 8 and 9 were originally scheduled to be held on 3–4 September at Suzuka, but were cancelled due to adverse weather conditions caused by Tropical Storm Talas. Round 8 was moved to the final race weekend at Motegi.

Round	Circuit	Date	Pole position	Fastest lap	Winning driver
1	Fuji Speedway, Oyama	23 April	(Japan) Kazuya Ishii	(Japan) Yūya Motojima	(Japan) Takamoto Katsuta
2	Fuji Speedway, Oyama	24 April	(Japan) Tsubasa Kondō	(Japan) Kazuki Hiramine	(Japan) Kazuki Hiramine
3	Suzuka Circuit, Suzuka	14 May	(Japan) Kazuya Ishii	(Japan) Kazuki Hiramine	(Japan) Kazuya Ishii
4	Suzuka Circuit, Suzuka	15 May	(Japan) Kazuki Hiramine	(Japan) Kazuki Hiramine	(Japan) Kazuki Hiramine
5	Fuji Speedway, Oyama	11 June	(Japan) Kazuki Hiramine	(Japan) Kazuki Hiramine	(Japan) Kazuki Hiramine
6	Fuji Speedway, Oyama	11 June	(Japan) Kazuki Hiramine	(Japan) Yūya Motojima	(Japan) Ryō Hirakawa
7	Fuji Speedway, Oyama	12 June	(Japan) Yūya Motojima	(Japan) Yūya Motojima	(Japan) Yūya Motojima
9	Suzuka Circuit, Suzuka	4 September	Race cancelled		
10	Suzuka Circuit, Suzuka	8 October	(Japan) Kazuya Ishii	(Japan) Takamoto Katsuta	(Japan) Kazuya Ishii
11	Suzuka Circuit, Suzuka	9 October	(Japan) Kazuya Ishii	(Japan) Takamoto Katsuta	(Japan) Takamoto Katsuta
8	Twin Ring Motegi, Motegi	5 November	(Japan) Ryō Hirakawa	(Japan) Mitsunori Takaboshi	(Japan) Tsubasa Kondō
12	Twin Ring Motegi, Motegi	5 November	(Japan) Ryō Hirakawa	(Japan) Takamoto Katsuta	(Japan) Takamoto Katsuta
13	Twin Ring Motegi, Motegi	6 November	(Japan) Ryō Hirakawa	(Japan) Takamoto Katsuta	(Japan) Takamoto Katsuta
14	Twin Ring Motegi, Motegi	6 November	(Japan) Ryō Hirakawa	(Japan) Takamoto Katsuta	(Japan) Takamoto Katsuta

== Championship standings ==
=== Drivers' Championship ===
Points were awarded to the top six classified finishers, with one point awarded for pole position and fastest lap respectively.

1	2	3	4	5	6	PP	FL
10	7	5	3	2	1	**1**	1

Pos.	Driver	FUJ		SUZ		FUJ			SUZ	SUZ		MOT				Points
1	(Japan) Takamoto Katsuta	1	3	3	4	19	7	11	C	3	1	3	1	1	1	78
2	(Japan) Ryō Hirakawa	2	2	7	3	2	1	3	C	4	5	**2**	3	2	2	73
3	(Japan) Kazuya Ishii	**Ret**	Ret	**1**	6	3	2	2	C	**1**	2	5	4	3	16	60
4	(Japan) Kazuki Hiramine	5	1	15	**1**	**1**	**6**	7	C	8	9	7	15	5	4	45
5	(Japan) Tsubasa Kondō	4	**9**	6	5	4	4	4	C	16	7	1	2	4	9	36
6	(Japan) Yūya Motojima	16	6	2	7	5	3	**1**	C	5	4	6	8	7	12	35
7	(Japan) Mitsunori Takaboshi	3	16	4	2	6	14	5	C	6	8	19	10	10	5	22
8	(Japan) Shinnosuke Yamada	8	8	9	10	10	8	8	C	2	3	10	7	8	7	12
9	(Japan) Shōta Kiyohara	Ret	4	8	8	8	9	Ret	C	11	6	4	6	6	11	9
10	(Japan) Keishi Niki	6	Ret	10	11	13	Ret	14	C	10	14	11	16	14	3	6
11	(Japan) Hiroki Shinotani	13	10	5	17	9	5	6	C	7	12	12	Ret	13	10	5
12	(Japan) Shintarō Kawabata	14	7	14	16	14	Ret	13	C	Ret	16	9	5	11	DNS	2
13	(Japan) Syunsuke Matsuzaki	9	5	Ret	9	11	15	12	C	13	15	15	11	12	Ret	2
14	(China) Zhu Daiwei	Ret	DNS	11	Ret	12	12	9	C	9	11	8	9	9	6	1
-	(Japan) Takanori Yamabe	7	13	13	12	7	10	10	C	12	13	13	Ret	15	8	0
-	(Japan) Kōhei Sutō	11	12	16	15	18	Ret	17	C	Ret	10	16	14	Ret	Ret	0
-	(Japan) Ryūnosuke Shibata	10	15	Ret	14	16	Ret	16	C	14	Ret	17	Ret	17	14	0
-	(Japan) Ryō Ogawa	15	11	12	13	17	11	15	C	DNS	17	14	12	16	13	0
-	(Japan) Kunihiro Iwatsuki	12	14	17	18	15	13	18	C	15	18	18	13	18	15	0
Pos.	Driver	FUJ		SUZ		FUJ			SUZ	SUZ		MOT				Points

Key
Colour	Result
Gold	Race winner
Silver	2nd place
Bronze	3rd place
Green	Points finish
Blue	Non-points finish
Blue	Non-classified finish (NC)
Purple	Did not finish (Ret)
Black	Disqualified (DSQ)
Black	Excluded (EX)
White	Did not start (DNS)
White	Race cancelled (C)
White	Withdrew (WD)
Blank	Did not participate

**Bold** – Pole
Italics – Fastest Lap
