= Yuya Motojima =

Japanese racing driver (born 1991)

Yūya Motojima
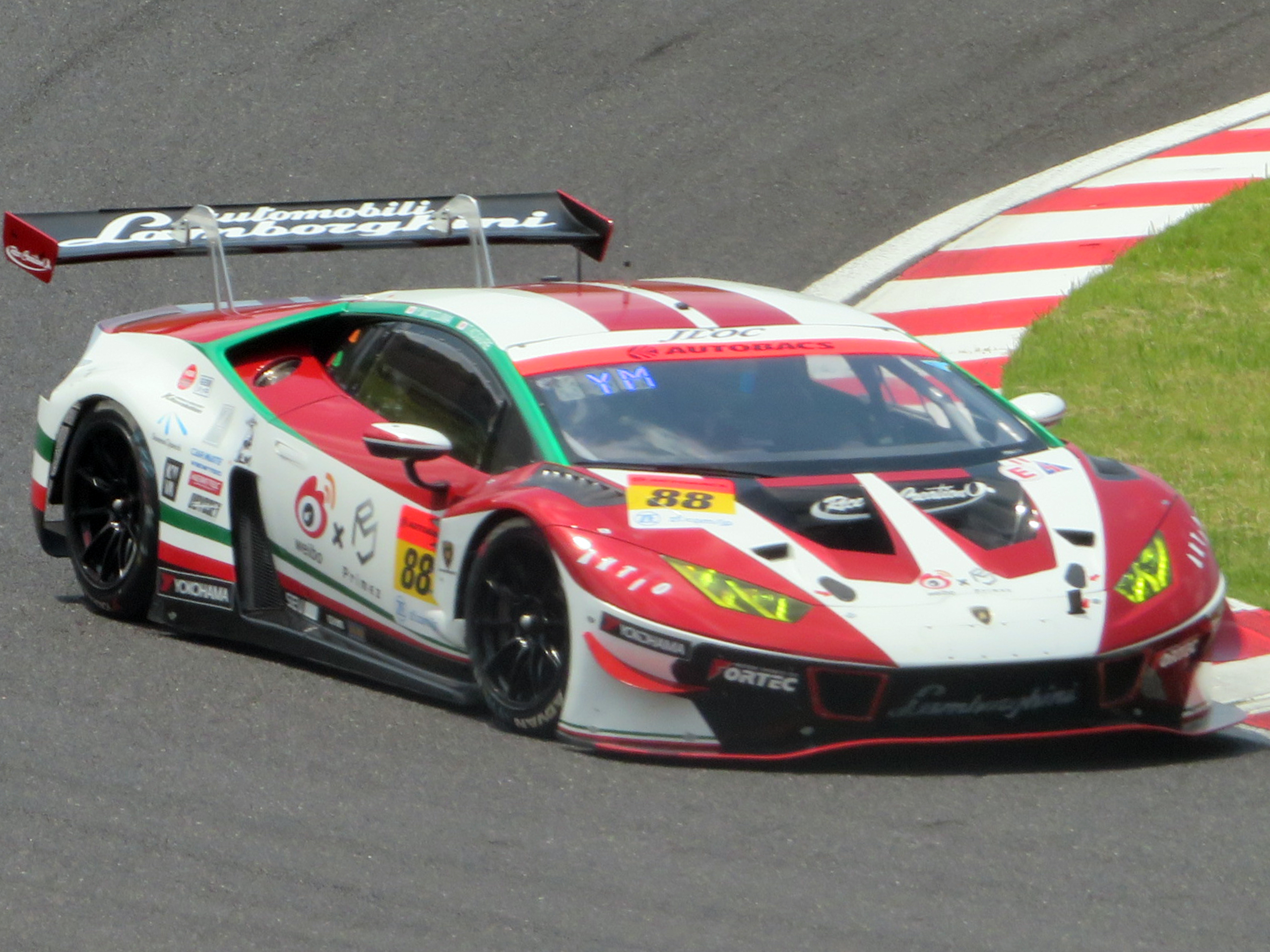
- Motojima competing at Suzuka in 2022
- Nationality: (Japan) Japanese
- Born: 10 April 1991 (age 35) Nakama, Fukuoka, Japan

Super GT - GT300 career
- Debut season: 2016
- Current team: JLOC
- Categorisation: FIA Silver
- Car number: 88
- Former teams: Team Taisan SARD, D'station Racing
- Starts: 75
- Wins: 5
- Podiums: 11
- Poles: 2
- Best finish: 1st in 2024

Previous series
- 2019–20 2014–15 2013–18, 2022– 2010–11: Asian Le Mans Series; Porsche Carrera Cup Japan; TGR GR86/BRZ Cup; Formula Challenge Japan

Championship titles
- 2024 2016 2015 2015: Super GT - GT300; Super Taikyū - ST-4; Super Taikyū - ST-X; Porsche Carrera Cup Japan

Yūya Motojima (元嶋佑弥, Motojima Yūya; born 10 April 1991) is a Japanese racing driver who currently competes in Super GT for JLOC and in the Super Taikyū Series for TKRI. He is the reigning champion of Super GT's GT300 class alongside longtime teammate Takashi Kogure, as well as a two-time class champion in Super Taikyū and the 2015 Porsche Carrera Cup Japan champion.

== Career ==
After graduating from the Honda-operated Suzuka Circuit Racing School and receiving the manufacturer's SRS-Formula scholarship in 2009, Motojima made his formula racing debut in the 2010 Formula Challenge Japan alongside fellow scholarship awardees Kazuki Hiramine and Shinji Nakamura. After a relatively consistent debut season where he claimed a win at Fuji, finishing fourth in the championship, Motojima remained in the championship for the 2011 season. Although he repeated his Fuji success with a pole-to-win run, Motojima would drop to sixth in the standings and would lose Honda backing at the end of 2011.

Faced with budget struggles after losing manufacturer backing, Motojima moved to race in the local Autopolis series of the entry-level Super FJ class. His domination granted him eligibility to contest the year-ending All-Japan final race at Suzuka, where he would triumph over the likes of Kenta Yamashita despite having to crowdfund his way to the grid.

After spending 2013 in the Toyota-operated 86/BRZ Race one-make series, Motojima shifted to sports car racing, stepping up to the Porsche Carrera Cup Japan with a scholarship for the series.

== Personal life ==
Born in Nakama in Fukuoka Prefecture, Motojima now lives in Nagoya. His younger brother Seiya is also a racing driver.

== Racing record ==
=== Career summary ===
Season	Series	Team	Races	Wins	Poles	FLaps	Podiums	Points	Position
2010	Formula Challenge Japan	HFDP/SRS Scholarship/Kotira R	12	1	0	2	2	32	4th
2011	Formula Challenge Japan	HFDP/SRS Scholarship/Kotira R	13	1	1	3	3	35	6th
2012	Super FJ Kyushu Series	MYST	4	3	4	2	4	75	**1st**
2012	Super FJ - All-Japan Masters Race	MYST	1	1	1	0	1	N/A	**1st**
2013	GAZOO Racing 86/BRZ Race	KOTA-R Rn-sports	7	0	0	0	1	26.5	9th
2013	JAF Formula 4 - East Series	Satou Seisakusho EKC MYST	1	1	1	1	1	20	8th
2014	Porsche Carrera Cup Japan	GARMIN PORSCHE		3					4th
2014	GAZOO Racing 86/BRZ Race	KOTA-R Rn-sports	10	0	0	0	1	40	10th
2014	Formula Masters China	Super License	5	0	0	0	3	37	12th
2015	Super Taikyū - ST-X	Endless Sports	6	3	1		5	108‡	**1st‡**
2015	Porsche Carrera Cup Japan	GARMIN PORSCHE	9	9	7	9	9	180	**1st**
2015	GAZOO Racing 86/BRZ Race	GY Racing	7	1	0	0	1	24	12th
2016	Super GT - GT300	Team Taisan SARD	7	0	0	0	0	12	17th
2016	TGR 86/BRZ Race	GY Racing	8	0	0	0	1	42	6th
2016	Super Taikyū - ST-4	Endless Sports	5	3	2	1	5	132‡	**1st‡**
2017	Super Taikyū - ST-X	Endless Sports	6	0	0	0	4	71‡	4th‡
2017	Super GT - GT300	D'station Racing	4	0	0	0	1	24	12th
2017	TGR 86/BRZ Race	GY Racing	7	0	0	0	0	12	16th
2017	Japanese Formula 3 Championship - National	Hanashima Racing	2	2	2	2	2	24	8th
2018	Super GT - GT300	JLOC	7	0	0	0	1	29	11th
2018	Intercontinental GT Challenge	JLOC	1	0	0	0	0	N/A	NC
2018	Super Taikyū - ST-X	D'station Racing	1	0	0	0	0	46.5‡	7th‡
2018	TGR 86/BRZ Race	BRIDE	2	0	0	0	0	4	22nd
2019	Super GT - GT300	JLOC	8	0	0	0	2	36.5	7th
2019	Super Taikyū - ST-X	SATO-SS Sports	3	0	0	0	2	65‡	5th‡
2019–20	Asian Le Mans Series - GT	JLOC	4	1	0		2	61	**3rd**
2020	Super GT - GT300	JLOC	8	0	0	0	1	20	13th
2020	Super Taikyū - ST-Z	TKRI	4	0	0	1	0	26‡	7th‡
2020	Super Taikyū - ST-X	D'station Racing	1	0	1	0	0	81‡	**1st‡**
2021	Super GT - GT300	JLOC	8	0	0	0	1	34	8th
2021	Super Taikyū - ST-Z	TKRI	5	1	0	1	1	41‡	9th‡
2021	Super Taikyū - ST-X	MP Racing	1	0	0	0	0	41‡	6th‡
2022	Super GT - GT300	JLOC	8	0	0	0	0	25	13th
2022	Super Taikyū - ST-X	TKRI	6	0	0	2	3	86.5‡	5th‡
2022	TGR GR86/BRZ Cup	DTEC Team MASTER ONE	6	0	0	0	0	16	14th
2023	Super GT - GT300	JLOC	8	1	0	1	1	40	7th
2023	Super Taikyū - ST-X	TKRI	6	1	0	0	5	113‡	4th‡
2023	TGR GR86/BRZ Cup	DTEC Team MASTER ONE	7	0	0	1	1	29	8th
2024	Super GT - GT300	JLOC	8	4	2	0	4	96	**1st**
2024	Super Taikyū - ST-X	TKRI	7	0	0	0	5	125‡	**3rd‡**
2024	TGR GR86/BRZ Cup	DTEC Team MASTER ONE	8	0	0	0	0	2	18th
2024	Lamborghini Super Trofeo Asia - Pro	Promotion Racing	2	0	1	0	0	N/A	NC†
2025	SRO Japan Cup - GT3	Max Racing	8	1	1	0	1	77	7th
2025	Super GT - GT300	JLOC	8	0	0	0	1	50.5	13th
2025	Super Taikyu - ST-X	TKRI							
2025	TGR GR86/BRZ Cup	DTEC Team MASTER ONE	6	0	0	0	0	18	13th
2026	Super Taikyu - ST-X	TKRI							
2026	Super GT - GT300	JLOC	8	0	0	0	0	25	26th
2026	SRO Japan Cup - GT3	Max Racing	8	1	1	0	6	135	**2nd**

‡ Team standings.

=== Complete Super GT results ===
(key) (Races in bold indicate pole position) (Races in italics indicate fastest lap)

Year	Team	Car	Class	1	2	3	4	5	6	7	8	9	Pos.	Points
2016	Team Taisan SARD	Audi R8 LMS ultra	GT300	OKA; 20									17th	12
2016	Team Taisan SARD	Audi R8 LMS	GT300		FSW; 15	SUG; 19	FSW; 8	SUZ; 20	CHA; WD	MOT; 6	MOT; 7		17th	12
2017	JLOC	Lamborghini Huracán GT3	GT300	OKA	FSW; 4	AUT			SUZ; 3	CHA	MOT		13th	21
2017	D'station Racing	Porsche 911 GT3 R (991)	GT300				SUG; 15	FSW; 8					13th	21
2018	JLOC	Lamborghini Huracán GT3	GT300	OKA; 12	FSW; 16	SUZ; 12	CHA; 5	FSW; Ret	SUG; 13	AUT; 2	MOT; 4		11th	29
2019	JLOC	Lamborghini Huracán GT3	GT300	OKA; 10	FSW; 3	SUZ; 19	CHA; 5	FSW; 5					7th	36.5
2019	JLOC	Lamborghini Huracán GT3 EVO	GT300						AUT; 3	SUG; 20	MOT; 11		7th	36.5
2020	JLOC	Lamborghini Huracán GT3 EVO	GT300	FSW; 25	FSW; 15	SUZ; 27	MOT; 2	FSW; 6	SUZ; 13	MOT; Ret	FSW; Ret		13th	20
2021	JLOC	Lamborghini Huracán GT3 EVO	GT300	OKA; 9	FSW; 6	MOT; 24	SUZ; 2	SUG; 7	AUT; 12	MOT; 4	FSW; 23		8th	34
2022	JLOC	Lamborghini Huracán GT3 EVO	GT300	OKA; 17	FSW; 5	SUZ; 5	FSW; 9	SUZ; 17	SUG; 13	AUT; 4	MOT; 5		13th	25
2023	JLOC	Lamborghini Huracán GT3 EVO	GT300	OKA; 24	FSW; 6	SUZ; 21							7th	40
2023	JLOC	Lamborghini Huracán GT3 EVO2	GT300				FSW; 8	SUZ; 4	SUG; 14	AUT; 7	MOT; 1		7th	40
2024	JLOC	Lamborghini Huracán GT3 EVO2	GT300	OKA; 8	**FSW**; 1^{1}	SUZ; 20	FSW; 5	SUG; 10	AUT; 1	MOT; 1	**SUZ**; 1^{1}		1st	96
2025	JLOC	Lamborghini Huracán GT3 EVO2	GT300	OKA; 9	FUJ; Ret	SEP; 4	FS1 (Ret)	FS2; 11	SUZ; 7	SUG; 15	AUT; 3	MOT; 14	13th	50.5
2026	JLOC	Lamborghini Huracán GT3 EVO2	GT300	OKA; 15	FUJ; 12	FUJ; 25	SUZ; 29†	SUG; 7	AUT; 18	MOT; 7	MOT; 14		26th	25

Sporting positions
Preceded by Kohta Kawaai; Hiroki Yoshida	Super GT; GT300 Champion; 2024; With: Takashi Kogure	Succeeded by TBD
