= Katsuyuki Hiranaka =

Japanese racing driver

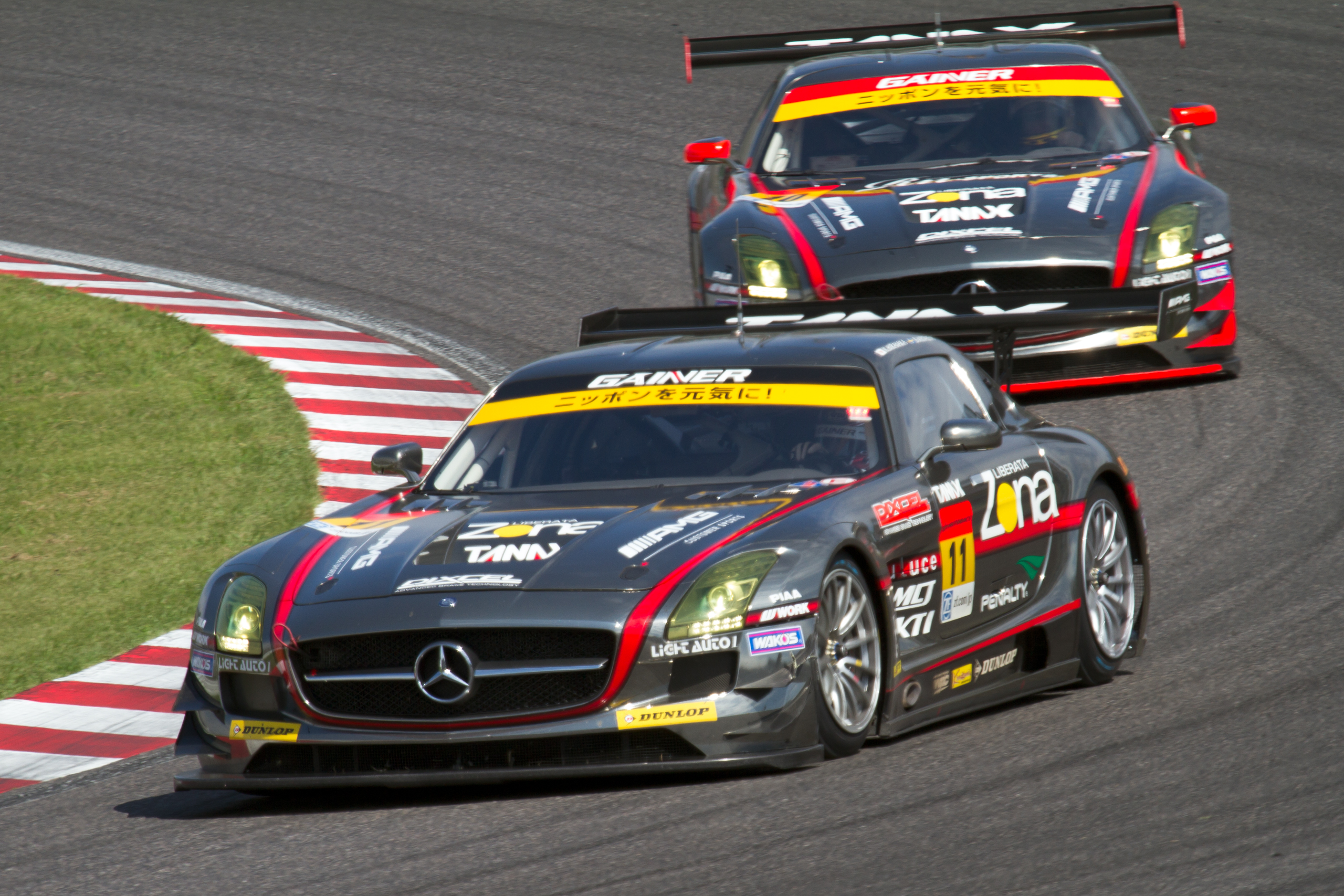
- Hiranaka (front) in 2014
- Nationality: Japanese
- Born: 4 October 1981 (age 45) Sapporo, Japan

Super GT career
- Debut season: 2005
- Current team: Shade Racing
- Categorisation: FIA Gold
- Car number: 20
- Former teams: Nakajima Racing; SARD; Cerumo; GAINER
- Starts: 75
- Wins: 4
- Poles: 3
- Fastest laps: 3
- Best finish: 2nd in 2011, 2013, 2014

Previous series
- 2005-08 2003-04 2002, 04: Formula Nippon; Formula 3 Euro Series; All-Japan Formula 3

Katsuyuki Hiranaka (平中 克幸, Hiranaka Katsuyuki; born 4 October 1981, in Sapporo, Hokkaido) is a Japanese race car driver.

== Career ==
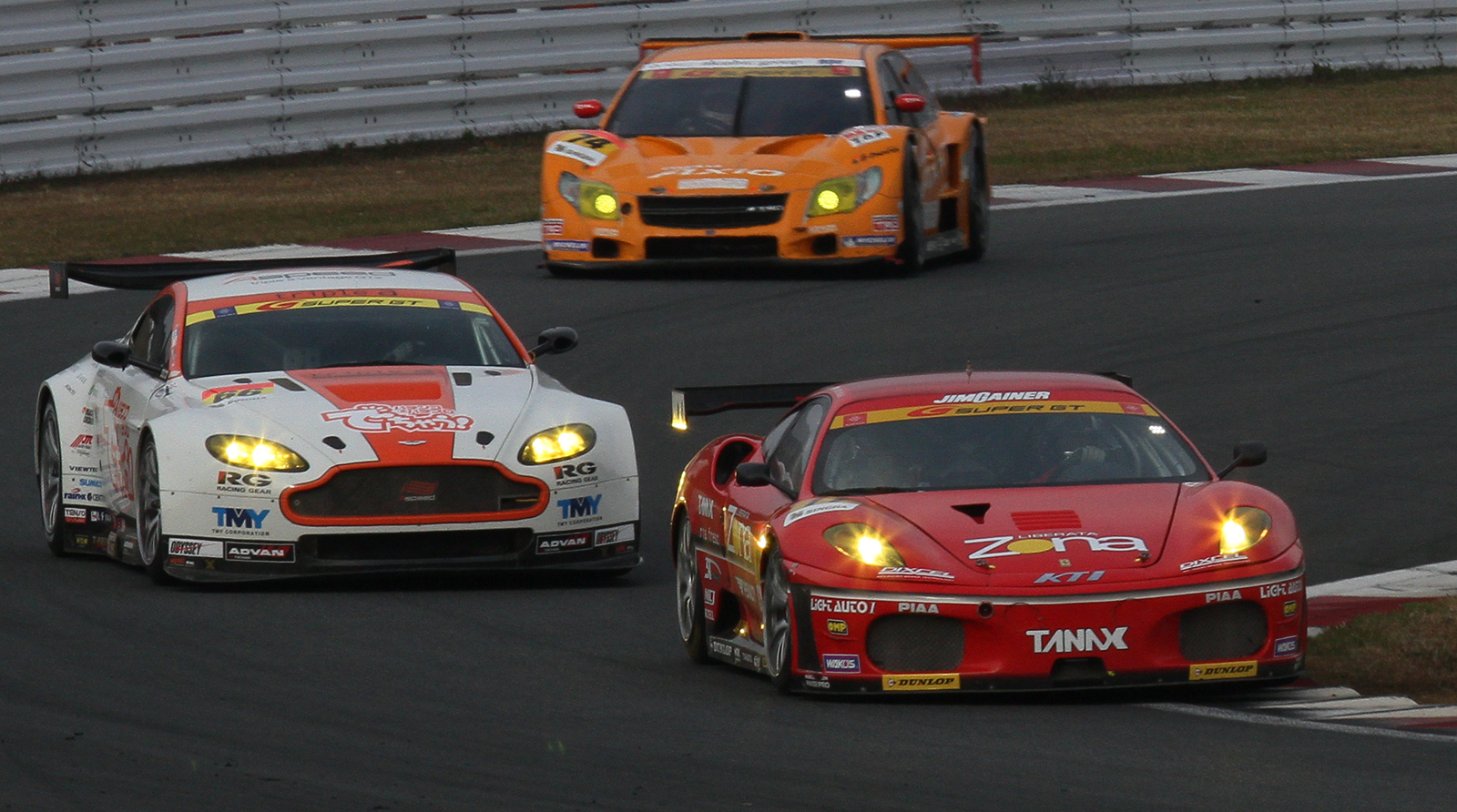
Hiranaka (leading) in the first GT300 race at the 2010 JAF Grand Prix

Hiranaka began karting in 1995 when he was 14, and in 2002 moved to the All-Japan Formula Three Championship, as a member of the TOM'S team. In 2002, he came fifth in the standings. Between 2003 and 2004, Hiranaka raced for Prema Powerteam in the Formula 3 Euro Series, came third at the Macau Grand Prix and tested for Toyota's Formula One team. He then returned to Japan and took part in the Super GT & Formula Nippon local series. He was GT300 runner-up three times for GAINER.

== Racing record ==
=== Career summary ===
Season	Series	Team	Races	Wins	Poles	F/Laps	Podiums	Points	Position
2002	Japanese Formula 3 Championship	TOM'S	20	0	0	1	7	142	5th
2002	Macau Grand Prix	TOM'S	1	0	0	0	0	N/A	4th
2002	Korea Super Prix	TOM'S	1	0	0	0	0	N/A	25th
2002	Masters of Formula 3	TOM'S	1	0	0	0	0	N/A	15th
2003	Formula 3 Euro Series	Prema Powerteam	20	0	0	1	0	4	22nd
2003	British Formula 3 International Series	Prema Powerteam	2	0	0	0	0	N/A	NC†
2003	Masters of Formula 3	Prema Powerteam	1	0	0	0	0	N/A	29th
2003	Macau Grand Prix	Prema Powerteam	1	0	0	0	1	N/A	**3rd**
2003	Korea Super Prix	Prema Powerteam	1	0	0	0	0	N/A	29th
2004	Japanese Formula 3 Championship	TOM's	2	0	0	0	1	14	14th
2004	Formula 3 Euro Series	Prema Powerteam	20	0	0	0	1	9	15th
2004	Macau Grand Prix	Prema Powerteam	1	0	0	0	0	N/A	23rd
2004	Masters of Formula 3	Prema Powerteam	1	0	0	0	0	N/A	22nd
2005	Formula Nippon	Takagi/Cerumo	9	0	0	1	0	2	13th
2005	Super GT - GT300	Toyota Team Cerumo	8	0	0	0	0	7	15th
2006	Formula Nippon	NTT DoCoMo Team Dandelion Racing	8	0	0	0	0	N/A	NC
2006	Super GT - GT500	Team SARD	9	0	0	0	0	13	23rd
2007	Formula Nippon	SG Team 5ZIGEN	9	0	0	0	0	N/A	NC
2007	Super GT - GT500	Team SARD	9	0	0	1	1	21	15th
2008	Formula Nippon	SG Team 5zigen	7	0	0	0	0	N/A	NC
2008	Super GT - GT500	Nakajima Racing	9	0	0	0	1	43	10th
2009	Super GT - GT300	GAINER	9	1	0	0	3	51	**3rd**
2010	Super GT - GT300	GAINER	7	0	0	0	0	34	7th
2010	Formula Nippon	KCMG	7	0	0	0	0	4	12th
2011	Super GT - GT300	GAINER	8	0	0	2	5	83	**2nd**
2012	Super GT - GT300	GAINER	8	1	1	0	1	47	7th
2013	Super GT - GT300	GAINER	8	2	0	0	3	80	**2nd**
2013	FIA World Endurance Championship - LMP2	GAINER International	1	0	0	0	0	N/A	NC
2014	Super GT - GT300	GAINER	8	1	0	0	5	80	**2nd**
2015	Super GT - GT300	GAINER	8	0	0	0	4	52	5th
2016	Super GT - GT300	GAINER	8	0	0	0	0	32	9th
2017	Super GT - GT300	GAINER	8	1	0	0	2	45	6th
2018	Super GT - GT300	GAINER	8	1	2	1	0	48	5th
2018	Super Taikyu - ST-4	Hayashi Telempu SHADE Racing	4	0	0	0	2	102.5‡	**2nd‡**
2019	Super GT - GT300	GAINER	8	2	2	0	0	48	**3rd**
2020	Super GT - GT300	GAINER	8	1	0	1	2	43	6th
2021	Super GT - GT300	GAINER	8	0	2	1	1	38	7th
2021	Super Taikyu - ST-Z	Hayashi Telempu SHADE Racing	6	0	0	2	0	42‡	8th‡
2022	Super GT - GT300	SHADE Racing	8	0	0	0	0	6	27th
2022	GT World Challenge Asia - GT4	TGR Team Koshido Racing	4	1	1	2	4	76	6th
2022	Super Taikyu - ST-Z	SHADE Racing	6	2	1	2	4	115.5‡	**2nd‡**
2023	Super GT - GT300	SHADE Racing	8	0	0	0	1	16	16th
2023	Super Taikyū - ST-Z	SHADE Racing	7	2	1	1	6	141.5	**2nd‡**
2024	Super GT - GT300	SHADE Racing	8	0	1	0	0	2	19th
2024	Super Taikyū - ST-Z	SHADE Racing	6	1	0	0	0	82.5‡	**2nd‡**
2025	Super GT - GT300	SHADE Racing	6	0	0	0	0	0	NC
2025	Super Taikyu - ST-Z	SHADE Racing	6	0	2	0	2	93.5‡	**3rd‡**
2026	Super GT - GT300	SHADE Racing							
2026	Super Taikyu - ST-Z	SHADE Racing							

* Season still in progress.
† – As Hiranaka was a guest driver, he was ineligible for points.

‡ Team standings.

=== Complete Japanese Formula 3 results ===
(key) (Races in bold indicate pole position) (Races in italics indicate fastest lap)

Year	Team	Engine	1	2	3	4	5	6	7	8	9	10	11	12	13	14	15	16	17	18	19	20	DC	Pts
2002	TOM'S	Toyota	TSU; 1; 5	TSU; 2; 5	SUZ; 1; 3	SUZ; 2; 10	FUJ; 1; 2	FUJ; 2 Ret	MIN; 1 Ret	MIN; 2; 5	MOT; 1; 4	MOT; 2; 3	SUZ; 1; 9	SUZ; 2; 7	SUG; 1; 3	SUG; 2 DNS	SEN; 1 Ret	SEN; 2; 2	TAI; 1; 4	TAI; 2; 3	MOT; 1; 13	MOT; 2; 3	5th	142
2004	TOM'S	Toyota	SUZ; 1	SUZ; 2	TSU; 1	TSU; 2	OKA; 1	OKA; 2	MOT; 1	MOT; 2	SUZ; 1	SUZ; 2	SUG; 1	SUG; 2	MIN; 1	MIN; 2	SEN; 1	SEN; 2	MIN; 1	MIN; 2	MOT; 1; 3	MOT; 2; 9	14th	14

=== Complete Formula 3 Euro Series results ===
(key)

Year	Entrant	Chassis	Engine	1	2	3	4	5	6	7	8	9	10	11	12	13	14	15	16	17	18	19	20	DC	Points
2003	Prema Powerteam	Dallara F303/007	Spiess-Opel	HOC; 1; 13	HOC; 2 Ret	ADR; 1; 12	ADR; 2; 12	PAU; 1; 6	PAU; 2; 13	NOR; 1; 14	NOR; 2 Ret	LMS; 1; 22	LMS; 2; 17	NÜR; 1; 8	NÜR; 2; 18	A1R; 1; 26	A1R; 2; 16	ZAN; 1; 10	ZAN; 2; 10	HOC; 1; 22	HOC; 2; 23	MAG; 1; 20	MAG; 2; 13	22nd	4
2004	Prema Powerteam	Dallara F304/009	Spiess-Opel	HOC; 1; 14	HOC; 2; 13	EST; 1; 19	EST; 2; 14	ADR; 1; 2	ADR; 1; 16	PAU; 1; 9	PAU; 2; 8	NOR; 1; 9	NOR; 1; 22											15th	9
2004	Prema Powerteam	Dallara F303/025	Spiess-Opel											MAG; 1 Ret	MAG; 2; 22	NÜR; 1; 24	NÜR; 2; 14	ZAN; 1; 10	ZAN; 2; 13	BRN; 1; 13	BRN; 2; 12	HOC; 1; 14	HOC; 2; 17	15th	9

=== Complete Formula Nippon results ===
(key)

Year	Entrant	Engine	1	2	3	4	5	6	7	8	9	10	11	DC	Points
2005	Team Cerumo	Mugen	MOT; 8	SUZ; Ret	SUG; Ret	FUJ; 6	SUZ; Ret	MIN; Ret	FUJ; 6	MOT; 12	SUZ; 9			13th	2
2006	DoCoMo Team Dandelion Racing	Honda	FUJ; 17	SUZ; 11	MOT; Ret	SUZ								22nd	0
2006	EMS Racing	Honda					AUT; 15	FUJ; 14	SUG; Ret	MOT; Ret	SUZ; Ret			22nd	0
2007	SG Team 5ZIGEN	Honda	FUJ; Ret	SUZ; 11	MOT; 17	OKA; 14	SUZ; 18	FUJ; 14	SUG; 11	MOT; 17	SUZ; 11			20th	0
2008	SG Team 5ZIGEN	Honda	FUJ; Ret	SUZ; 12	MOT; 13	OKA; 15	SUZ1	SUZ2	MOT1	MOT2	FUJ1; 15	FUJ2; 15	SUG; Ret	21st	0
2010	KCMG	Toyota	SUZ; Ret	MOT; DNS	FUJ; 13	MOT; 7	SUG; Ret	AUT; 7	SUZ1; 12	SUZ2; 13				12th	4

=== Complete Super GT results ===
(key) (Races in bold indicate pole position) (Races in italics indicate fastest lap)

Year	Team	Car	Class	1	2	3	4	5	6	7	8	9	DC	Pts
2005	Toyota Team Cerumo	Toyota Celica	GT300	OKA; 11	FUJ; 14	SEP; 12	SUG; 8	MOT; 14	FUJ; Ret	AUT; 8	SUZ; 18		15th	7
2006	Toyota Team SARD	Toyota Supra	GT500	SUZ; 11	OKA; 13	FUJ; 11	SEP; 13	SUG; Ret	SUZ; 11	MOT; 9	AUT; 10	FUJ; 10	23rd	13
2007	Toyota Team SARD	Lexus SC430	GT500	SUZ; Ret	OKA; 12	FUJ; 8	SEP; 13	SUG; 6	SUZ; 11	MOT; 10	AUT; 3	FUJ; 13	15th	21
2008	Epson Nakajima Racing	Honda NSX	GT500	SUZ; 10	OKA; 5	FUJ; 7	SEP; Ret	SUG; Ret	SUZ; 11	MOT; 5	AUT; 2	FUJ; 4	10th	43
2009	GAINER	Ferrari F430	GT300	**OKA**; 4	SUZ; 4	FUJ; Ret	SEP; 8	SUG; 3	SUZ; 5	FUJ; 2	AUT; 1	MOT; 4	**3rd**	**79**
2010	GAINER	Ferrari F430 GT2	GT300	SUZ; Ret	OKA; 7	FUJ; 6	SEP; 4	SUG; 5	SUZ; 8	FUJ; C	MOT; 4		7th	34
2011	GAINER	Ferrari 458 Italia GT2	GT300	**OKA**; 2	FUJ; 2	SEP; 2	SUG; 7	SUZ; 4	FUJ; 22	AUT; 2	MOT; 3		**2nd**	**83**
2012	GAINER	Audi R8 LMS ultra	GT300	OKA; 1	**FUJ**; 5	SEP; 7	SUG; 6	SUZ; 5	FUJ; 7	AUT; 16	MOT; 13		7th	47
2013	GAINER	Mercedes-Benz SLS AMG GT3	GT300	OKA; 1	FUJ; 6	SEP; 3	SUG; 13	SUZ; 6	FUJ; 7	AUT; 4	MOT; 1		**2nd**	**80**
2014	GAINER	Mercedes-Benz SLS AMG GT3	GT300	OKA; 3	FUJ; 2	AUT; 3	SUG; Ret	FUJ; 2	SUZ; 10	CHA; 8	**MOT**; 1		**2nd**	**78**
2015	GAINER	Mercedes-Benz SLS AMG GT3	GT300	OKA; 12	FUJ; 3	CHA; 4	FUJ; 3	SUZ; 11	SUG; 3	AUT; Ret	MOT; 3		5th	52
2016	GAINER	Mercedes-AMG GT3	GT300	OKA; 4	FUJ; Ret	SUG; 4	FUJ; 7	SUZ; Ret	CHA; 9	**MOT**; 4	MOT; 10		9th	32
2017	GAINER	Mercedes-AMG GT3	GT300	OKA; 18	FUJ; 2	AUT; 22	SUG; 1	FUJ; 17	SUZ; 9	CHA; 8	MOT; 7		6th	45
2018	GAINER	Nissan GT-R Nismo GT3	GT300	OKA; 5	FUJ; 3	SUZ; 16	CHA; 1	FUJ; 22	SUG; 19	AUT; 6	MOT; 5		5th	48
2019	GAINER	Nissan GT-R Nismo GT3	GT300	OKA; 21	FUJ; 1	SUZ; 9	CHA; 8	FUJ; 9	AUT; 15	SUG; 22	MOT; 1		**3rd**	**48**
2020	GAINER	Nissan GT-R Nismo GT3	GT300	FUJ; 2	FUJ; 21	SUZ; 1	MOT; 6	FUJ; 10	SUZ; 15	MOT; 9	FUJ; 18		6th	43
2021	GAINER	Nissan GT-R Nismo GT3	GT300	**OKA**; 4	FUJ; 16	SUZ; 26	**MOT**; 2	SUG; 10	AUT; 5	MOT; 8	FUJ; 8		7th	38
2022	SHADE Racing	Toyota GR86 GT300	GT300	OKA; 14	FUJ; 20	SUZ; DNS	FUJ; Ret	SUZ; 7	SUG; 23	AUT; 9	MOT; 21		27th	6
2023	SHADE Racing	Toyota GR86 GT300	GT300	OKA; Ret	FUJ; 12	SUZ; 10	FUJ; 15	SUZ; 18	SUG; 2	AUT; 13	MOT; 14		16th	16
2024	SHADE Racing	Toyota GR86 GT300	GT300	OKA; 13	FUJ; 19	SUZ; 15	FUJ; 19	**SUG**; **Ret**	AUT; 9	MOT; 16	SUZ; 19		19th	2
2025	SHADE Racing	Toyota GR86 GT300	GT300	OKA; Ret	FUJ; 17	SEP	FS1 (16)	FS2; 21	SUZ; DNS	SUG; Ret	AUT	MOT; 25	NC	0
2026	SHADE Racing	Lexus RC F GT3	GT300	OKA	FUJ	SEP	FUJ	SUZ	SUG	AUT	MOT			
