= Super FJ =

Japanese motor racing series

- Category: Formula racing
- Country: Japan
- Inaugural season: 2007
- Engine suppliers: Honda
- Tyre suppliers: Dunlop
- Official website: Official website

Super FJ, commonly abbreviated as S-FJ, is a single-seater motor racing category based in Japan. Utilized by several regional championships throughout Japan since its introduction in 2007 by the Japan Automobile Federation, the category is overseen by the Japan Scholarship System and supported by the FJ Association, and is commonly referred to as the entry point on the Japanese formula racing ladder.

Numerous graduates of Super FJ have gone on to achieve high-level success in motorsport, including ex-Formula One driver Yūki Tsunoda, FIA World Endurance Championship champion Ryō Hirakawa, Super GT champions Tadasuke Makino and Kenta Yamashita, and Super Formula driver Ayumu Iwasa.

== Origins and history ==
Since its inception in 1980, the Formula Ford-adjacent FJ1600 series had served as Japan's entry-level formula racing category; however, the Subaru-manufactured EA71 engine, originally introduced in 1976 for use in the Subaru Leone and long utilised as the regulation engines for FJ1600, had become increasingly difficult to source since the engine was discontinued in 1994. In response to calls for a more accessible regulation set, Super FJ was announced by the Japan Automobile Federation in November 2006 as Japan's new entry-level formula racing category.

In the inaugural 2007 season, Super FJ featured JAF-sanctioned regional championships at four major circuits throughout Japan. The Suzuka Series featured grids of solely Super FJ cars, while the championships at Motegi, Okayama, and Tsukuba were run alongside the existing FJ1600 entries. In the subsequent years, new regional championships were introduced for Fuji Speedway, Autopolis, and the northern Tōhoku region (where the championship was held between Sportsland SUGO and Sendai Hi-Land Raceway until the latter's closure in 2014.)

Since 2007, champions and other top competitors in each regional series have competed in the season-ending final race (Japanese: 日本一決定戦; lit. "Japan's No. 1 Deciding Race"; variously referred to as the All-Japan "Masters Race," "National Championship," and "Final") at Suzuka International Racing Course in December. Through the Japan Scholarship System, top drivers in the final race are awarded scholarships to compete in higher-level formula (typically the F4 Japanese Championship) for the following season.

== Car specifications ==
A number of chassis manufacturers compete in Super FJ, with all cars adhering to the same series regulations. All cars feature a Honda L15A engine (originally manufacturered for the Honda Fit) mated to a five-speed manual racing transmission, powering a steel space-frame chassis designed as an evolution of the FJ1600/Formula Ford design. Unlike the FJ1600 cars, Super FJ cars feature front and rear wings.

Chassis	Jidousya Koubou MYST KK-S; WEST RACING CARS 11J; Tokyo R&D, Co. RD10V
Engine	Honda Motor Co. L15A SOHC 1,500cc inline-4
Gearbox	TODA RACING S-FJ specification 5-speed dogleg manual transmission
Minimum weight	420 kg (495 kg with driver)
Power output	~118 bhp
Fuel capacity	20 litres
Fuel delivery	Direct fuel injection
Aspiration	Naturally aspirated
Brakes	4-piston aluminum caliper disc brakes
Length	3,700 mm
Width	1,700 mm (including tyres)
Wheelbase	2,200 mm
Minimum ground clearance	50 mm
Steering	Rack and pinion
Tyres	13-inch Dunlop slick tyres (Yokohama supplied tyres between 2010 and 2021)

== Champions ==
Season	All-Japan Masters Race	Suzuka Series	Okayama Series	Motegi Series	Tōhoku/SUGO Series	Tsukuba Series	Fuji Series	Autopolis Series
2007	(Japan) Takeshi Matsumoto	(Japan) Mitsuhiko Tsukada	(Japan) Takeshi Matsumoto	(Japan) Takahiro Ikawa	Not held	Cancelled	Not held	Not held
2008	(Japan) Keishi Niki	(Japan) Mitsuhiko Tsukada	(Japan) Masanori Yonekura	(Japan) Yōsuke Morishita	Not held	(Japan) Daisuke Nakabayashi	Not held	Not held
2009	(Japan) Naoki Nishimoto	(Japan) Naoki Nishimoto	(Japan) Katsumasa Katayose	(Japan) Daisuke Nakabayashi	Not held	(Japan) Yūichi Nakayama	(Japan) Naoki Nishimoto	Not held
2010	(Japan) Ryō Hirakawa	(Japan) Takayoshi Nakano	(Japan) Ryō Hirakawa	(Japan) Takuya Tanaka	Not held	(Japan) Takanori Yamabe	(Japan) Takamitsu Matsui	(Japan) Nobuhiro Yoshida
2011	(Japan) Satoshi Katō	(Japan) Satoshi Katō	(Japan) Katsuhisa Kitaguchi	(Japan) Ryōsuke Takehira	Not held	(Japan) Yōsuke Yamazaki	(Japan) "OSAMU"	(Japan) Tomio Masuda
2012	(Japan) Yūya Motojima	(Japan) Keishi Ishikawa	(Japan) Keishi Ishikawa	(Japan) Kenta Yamashita	(Japan) Shōhei Yuzawa	(Japan) Takumi Kuroiwa	(Japan) "OSAMU"	(Japan) Yūya Motojima
2013	(Japan) Shinnosuke Yamada	(Japan) Mizuki Ishizaka	(Japan) Shinnosuke Yamada	(Japan) Rintaro Kubo	(Japan) Tomoki Obara	(Japan) Yūki Nemoto	(Japan) Tatsuya Ōta	(Japan) Nobuhiro Yoshida
2014	(Japan) Tadasuke Makino	(Japan) Shunsuke Kohno	(Japan) Tadasuke Makino	(Japan) Takuro Shinohara	(Japan) Takuro Shinohara	(Japan) Kyōta Takahashi	(Japan) Ryūta Imai	(Japan) Takahide Tasaki
2015	(Japan) Sena Sakaguchi	(Japan) Reiji Hiraki	(Japan) Toshiki Ōyu	(Japan) Kohta Kawaai	(Japan) Taiga Katō	(Japan) Masato Yamaura	(Japan) Takumi Fukamura	(Japan) Kinya Kawachi
2016	(Japan) Yūki Tsunoda	(Japan) Yūki Urata	(Japan) Hirokuni Kojima	(Japan) Takashi Itō	(Japan) "KAMIKAZE"	(Japan) Toshiki Komura	(Japan) Masafumi Uemura	(Japan) Ryō Yoshimoto
2017	(Japan) Teppei Natori	(Japan) View Yamauchi	(Japan) Daichi Okamoto	(Japan) Shōta Ogura	(Japan) Riki Ōkusa	(Japan) Masamitsu Ōtake	(Japan) Riki Ōkusa	(Japan) Isao Nakajima
2018	(Japan) Atsushi Miyake	(Japan) Atsushi Miyake	(Japan) Kazuya Ōshima	(Japan) Seiya Jin	(Japan) Rin Arakawa	(Japan) Masamitsu Ōtake	(Japan) Ryūichirō Ishizaki	(Japan) Rin Arakawa
2019	(Japan) Ayumu Iwasa	(Japan) Ryūnosuke Sawa	(Japan) Tsubasa Iriyama	(Japan) Yūgo Iwasawa	(Japan) Hajime Yamakage	(Japan) "KAMIKAZE"	(Japan) Aito Kinoshita	(Japan) Tomio Masuda
2020	(Japan) Seiya Motojima	(Japan) Daichi Okamoto	(Japan) Ryōhei Shikatani	(Japan) Ryōsuke Niikura	(Japan) Shūya Sugō	(Japan) Takashi Itō		(Japan) Kazuma Nishimura
2021	(Japan) Daitetsu Ueno	(Japan) Daichi Okamoto	(Japan) Daichi Okamoto	(Japan) Itsuki Satō		(Japan) Haruki Nojima		(Japan) Yūki Irie
2022	(Japan) Hironobu Shimizu	(Japan) Tōsei Moriyama	Not held	(Japan) Sōryū Tagami		(Japan) Sōryū Tagami		(Japan) Hironobu Shimizu
2023	(Japan) Yū Oda	(Japan) Ryō Shirasaki		(Japan) Suzukaze Uchida		(Japan) Toshiki Komura		(Japan) Nozomu Udaka
2024	(Japan) Daichi Okamoto	(Japan) Ryūma Sako		(Japan) Yū Oda		(Japan) Shun Itō		(Japan) Ryō Yoshimoto
2025	(Japan) Ryōki Minoura	(Japan) Kaoru Yoshida		(Japan) Shōta Sakai		(Japan) Atsuki Tsuda		(Japan) Shōta Sakai
