= Shinnosuke Yamada =

Japanese racing driver (born 1992)

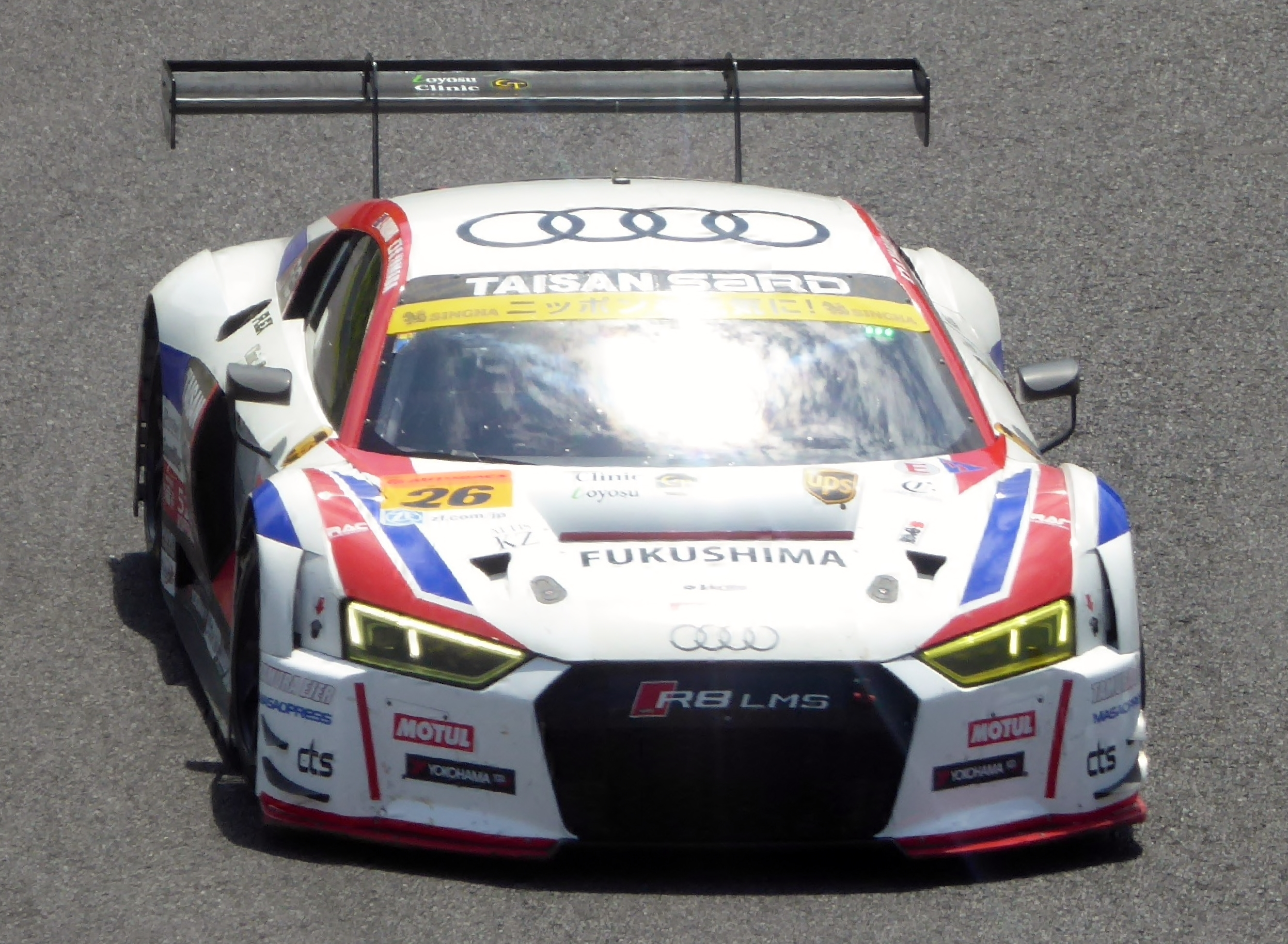
- Yamada in 2017
- Nationality: (Japan) Japanese
- Born: 29 August 1992 (age 34) Okayama, Japan
- Categorisation: FIA Silver

Championship titles
- 2025 2013 2013: Super Taikyu – ST-4; Super FJ – All-Japan Masters Race; Super FJ – Okayama Series

Shinnosuke Yamada (山田 真之亮, Yamada Shinnosuke; born 29 August 1992 in Okayama) is a Japanese racing driver currently racing for SHADE Racing in the ST-4 class of Super Taikyu.

== Early career ==
In late 2010, Yamada won the Honda SRS-F scholarship to compete in the 2011 Formula Challenge Japan.

In 2015, Yamada joined B-Max Racing Team to compete in the inaugural season of the F4 Japanese Championship. He won race two at Autopolis and concluded the season fourth in points.

== Super GT ==
Stepping up to GT300 for 2016, Yamada joined Team UpGarage with Bandoh alongside Yuhki Nakayama. In 2017, Yamada switched to Team Taisan SARD, partnering Jake Parsons, scoring a best result of 14th twice across the eight-round season. Yamada stayed with Team Taisan for the 2018 season. At the season-opener in Okayama, Yamada scored his only points of the season, finishing ninth and scoring two points. With Team Taisan exiting Super GT following the 2018 season, Yamada returned to Team UpGarage as their third driver for the 2019 season, taking a best result of 12th at Fuji.

In early 2020, it was announced that Yamada would join JLOC alongside Tsubasa Takahashi. At the sixth round of the season at Suzuka, Yamada scored his only points-paying position of the season by taking sixth after benefitting from an earlier safety car intervention. During 2022, Yamada returned to GT300, racing as SHADE Racing's third driver for the fifth round of the season at Suzuka. However, Yamada didn't run the race and thus wasn't credited with the team's seventh-place finish. In 2023, Yamada returned to SHADE Racing's GT300 operations as a third driver for five out of eight races. Despite being entered for five races, Yamada didn't run in those and thus wasn't credited with points when Shade Racing finished tenth at Suzuka.

Yamada remained with SHADE Racing for 2024, racing in the ST-4 class of Super Taikyu, scoring class wins at both Fuji races to help the team end the year runner-up in points. Returning to the team and class for the following year, Yamada won both races at Okayama as well as winning the Fuji 24 Hours in class en route to the ST-4 at the end of the year. In 2026, Yamada continued with SHADE for another season in the ST-4 class of Super Taikyu.

== Racing record ==
=== Racing career summary ===
Season	Series	Team	Races	Wins	Poles	F/Laps	Podiums	Points	Position
2011	Formula Challenge Japan	HFDP/SRS-F/Kotira R	13	0	0	0	2	12	8th
2013	Super FJ – Okayama Series	Bloom Group & MTN	??	4	??	??	??	??	**1st**
2013	Super FJ – All-Japan Masters Race	Bloom Group & MTN	??	??	??	??	??	??	**1st**
2014	JAF F4 – Grand Champion		??	??	??	??	??	142	5th
2015	F4 Japanese Championship	B-MAX Racing Team	14	1	0	0	4	84	4th
2016	Super GT – GT300	Team UpGarage with Bandoh	8	0	1	1	0	25	14th
2017	Super GT – GT300	Team Taisan SARD	8	0	0	0	0	0	NC
2018	Super GT – GT300	Team Taisan	7	0	0	0	0	2	21st
2018	Super Taikyu – ST-X	Endless Sports	1	0	0	0	0	88‡	**3rd‡**
2019	Super GT – GT300	Team UpGarage	2	0	0	0	0	0	NC
2019	Super Taikyu – ST-Z	Endless Sports	1	1	0	1	1	160‡	**1st‡**
2020	Super GT – GT300	JLOC	8	0	0	0	0	5	25th
2020	Super Taikyu – ST-Z	Endless Sports	1	1	0	0	1	129.5‡	**1st‡**
2021	Super Taikyu – ST-Z	Techno First	3	0	0	0	0	16‡	12th‡
2021	Super Taikyu – ST-Z	Hayashi Telempu SHADE Racing	1	0	0	1	0	42‡	8th‡
2022	Super GT – GT300	SHADE Racing	1	0	0	0	0	0	NC
2022	Super Taikyu – ST-Z	SHADE Racing	1	0	0	1	0	115.5‡	**2nd‡**
2022	Super Taikyu – ST-4	SHADE Racing	5	1	1	2	1	142‡	**2nd‡**
2023	Super GT – GT300	SHADE Racing	5	0	0	0	0	0	NC
2023	Super Taikyu – ST-4	SHADE Racing	6	0	3	0	1	56‡	7th‡
2024	Super Taikyu – ST-4	SHADE Racing	6	2	1	1	4	118‡	**2nd‡**
2025	Super Taikyu – ST-4	SHADE Racing	6	3	4	0	4	133.5‡	**1st‡**
2026	Super Taikyu – ST-4	SHADE Racing						‡	‡

‡ Team standings

=== Complete Formula Challenge Japan results ===
(key) (Races in bold indicate pole position) (Races in italics indicate fastest lap)

Year	Team	1	2	3	4	5	6	7	8	9	10	11	12	13	14	DC	Pts
2011	HFDP/SRS-F/Kotira R	FUJ1; 1; 8	FUJ1; 2; 8	SUZ1; 1; 9	SUZ1; 2; 10	FUJ2; 1; 10	FUJ2; 2; 8	FUJ2; 3; 8	SUZ2; C	SUZ3; 1; 2	SUZ3; 2; 3	MOT; 1; 10	MOT; 2; 7	MOT; 3; 8	MOT; 4; 7	8th	12

=== Complete F4 Japanese Championship results ===
(key) (Races in bold indicate pole position) (Races in italics indicate fastest lap)

Year	Team	1	2	3	4	5	6	7	8	9	10	11	12	13	14	DC	Pts
2015	B-Max Racing Team	OKA; 1 Ret	OKA; 2 Ret	FUJ1; 1; 3	FUJ1; 2; 3	FUJ2; 1; 7	FUJ2; 2; 6	SUZ; 1; 7	SUZ; 2; 7	SUG; 1; 10	SUG; 2 Ret	AUT; 1; 3	AUT; 2; 1	MOT; 1; 6	MOT; 2; 8	4th	84

=== Complete Super GT results ===
Year	Team	Car	Class	1	2	3	4	5	6	7	8	DC	Pts
2016	Team Up Garage with Bandoh	Toyota 86	GT300	OKA; 15	FUJ; 4	SUG; 8	FUJ; 10	SUZ; 4	CHA; 22	MOT; 12	MOT; 9	14th	25
2017	Team Taisan SARD	Audi R8 LMS	GT300	OKA; 21	FUJ; 21	AUT; 14	SUG; 18	FUJ; 19	SUZ; Ret	CHA; 19	MOT; 14	NC	0
2018	Team Taisan	Audi R8 LMS	GT300	OKA; 9	FUJ; 15	SUZ; 28	CHA	FUJ; Ret	SUG; 20	AUT; 20	MOT; 16	21st	2
2019	Team UpGarage	Honda NSX GT3	GT300	OKA	FUJ; 12	SUZ	CHA	**FUJ**; 4 (Note: Did not run in race as third driver and therefore ineligible for points)	SUG	AUT	MOT	NC	0
2020	JLOC	Lamborghini Huracán GT3 EVO	GT300	FSW; 26	FSW; 25	SUZ; 16	MOT; Ret	FSW; 17	SUZ; 6	MOT; 26	FSW; Ret	25th	5
2022	SHADE Racing	Toyota GR86 GT300	GT300	OKA	FUJ	SUZ	FUJ	SUZ; 7	SUG	AUT	MOT	NC	0
2023	SHADE Racing	Toyota GR86 GT300	GT300	OKA	FUJ; 12	SUZ; 10	FUJ; 15	SUZ; 18	SUG	AUT; 13	MOT	NC	0
