= SHADE Racing =

Japanese racing team

- Founded: 2015
- Base: Oyama, Shizuoka Prefecture
- Team principal(s): Kosuke Ogasawara
- Founder(s): Hayashi Telempu
- Current series: Super GT; Super Taikyu
- Current drivers: Super GT - GT300: Katsuyuki Hiranaka; Eijiro Shimizu; Super Taikyu ST-Z: Dai Mizuno; Katsuyuki Hiranaka; Yuji Kunimoto; Tsubasa Mekaru; Super Taikyu ST-4: Tatsuya Osaki; Eijiro Shimizu; Shinnosuke Yamada
- Website: www.shade-racing.com

SHADE Racing (シェイドレーシング, Kabushiki gaisha Shade Racing) (abbreviated as Specialized Hayashi Telempu Driving Emotion Racing.) is a Japanese racing team which competes in Super GT and Super Taikyu championship.

== History ==
SHADE Racing was founded in 2015 by an automotive parts company name Hayashi Telempu. The team started to compete in Toyota Gazoo Racing 86/BRZ Race where they still compete as of 2024.

=== Super Taikyu ===
The team made their debut in Super Taikyu in 2018. They competed in ST-4 class with Honda Integra Type-R, with Katsuyuki Hiranaka, Hiro Hayashi, Hiroki Yoshida where they clinched second place in the class standing. For 2019, the team changed the car to Toyota 86, they also clinched 2 wins with Hiranaka, Yuji Kunimoto, and Hiro Hayashi.

=== Super GT – GT300 ===
SHADE Racing entered Super GT for the first time, with a Toyota GR86 GT300 riding on Dunlop tyres. Three-time GT300 championship runner-up Katsuyuki Hiranaka (who had spent the previous 13 seasons at Gainer), and F4 Japanese Championship graduate Eijiro Shimizu were announced as the team's driver line-up. For 2023, the team retained the same line up, with Shinosuke Yamada acting as the third driver. In that season, they achieved their maiden podium in Sportsland Sugo where they ended up in second place. In 2024, Shade Racing is set to change tyre suppliers from Dunlop to Michelin.
