= 2026 Super Taikyu Series =

Japanese sports car racing season

The 2026 Eneos Super Taikyu Series Empowered by Bridgestone was the thirty-sixth season of the Super Taikyu endurance racing championship. It marked 35 years since the inaugural season of the championship took place in 1991. It began on 21 March at Mobility Resort Motegi and finished on 15 November at Fuji Speedway.

== Calendar ==
The Super Taikyu Series announced its provisional 2026 calendar on 19 November 2025, with seven rounds held at Japan's six major motor racing circuits.

Round	Event	Race Length	Race Format	Classes	Circuit	Date
1	Motegi Super Taikyu 4 Hours Race	4 hours	2 races	Race 1: ST-X / Q (#104) / 1 / 3 / 4 / 5F / 5R	Mobility Resort Motegi	21 March
1	Motegi Super Taikyu 4 Hours Race	4 hours	2 races	Race 2: ST-X / Z / Q (#28, #61) / 1 / 2	Mobility Resort Motegi	22 March
2	SUZUKA 5 Hours Race	5 hours	1 race	ST-X / Z / Q / TCR / USA / 1 / 2 / 3 / 4	Suzuka Circuit	19 April
3	NAPAC Fuji 24 Hours Race	24 hours	1 race	All	Fuji Speedway	6–7 June
4	SUGO Super Taikyu 4 Hours Race	4 hours	2 races	Group 2: ST-TCR / USA / 3 / 4 / 5F / 5R	Sportsland SUGO	4 July
4	SUGO Super Taikyu 4 Hours Race	4 hours	2 races	Group 1: ST-X / Z / Q (#28) / 1 / 2	Sportsland SUGO	5 July
5	Super Taikyu Race in Autopolis	5 hours	1 race	ST-X / Z / Q / TCR / USA / 1 / 3 / 5F / 5R	Autopolis	26 July
6	Super Taikyu Race in Okayama	3 hours	2 races	Group 2: ST-Q / 2 / 4 / 5F / 5R	Okayama International Circuit	25 October
6	Super Taikyu Race in Okayama	3 hours	2 races	Group 1: ST-X / Z / TCR / USA	Okayama International Circuit	25 October
7	S-Tai FINAL Big Thanksgiving	4 hours	1 race	All	Fuji Speedway	15 November

== Teams and drivers ==
=== ST-X (FIA GT3) ===
Team	Car	Engine	No.	Drivers	Rounds
(Japan) TKRI	Mercedes-AMG GT3 Evo	Mercedes-AMG M159 6.2 L V8	23	(Japan) "Daisuke"	All
(Japan) TKRI	Mercedes-AMG GT3 Evo	Mercedes-AMG M159 6.2 L V8	23	(Japan) Tatsuya Kataoka	All
(Japan) TKRI	Mercedes-AMG GT3 Evo	Mercedes-AMG M159 6.2 L V8	23	(Japan) Yuhki Nakayama	All
(Japan) TKRI	Mercedes-AMG GT3 Evo	Mercedes-AMG M159 6.2 L V8	23	(Japan) Yuya Motojima	1–3, 5, 7
(Japan) apr	Lexus RC F GT3	Lexus 2UR-GSE 5.4 L V8	31	(Japan) Ryo Ogawa	All
(Japan) apr	Lexus RC F GT3	Lexus 2UR-GSE 5.4 L V8	31	(Japan) Koki Saga	All
(Japan) apr	Lexus RC F GT3	Lexus 2UR-GSE 5.4 L V8	31	(Japan) Hiroaki Nagai	1–3, 5–7
(Japan) apr	Lexus RC F GT3	Lexus 2UR-GSE 5.4 L V8	31	(Japan) Naoya Gamou	1, 3–7
(Japan) apr	Lexus RC F GT3	Lexus 2UR-GSE 5.4 L V8	31	(Japan) Hideki Nagai	3
(Japan) apr	Lexus RC F GT3	Lexus 2UR-GSE 5.4 L V8	31	(Japan) Sena Sakaguchi	3
(Japan) apr	Lexus RC F GT3	Lexus 2UR-GSE 5.4 L V8	31	(Japan) Ryuta Ukai	4
(Hong Kong) Craft-Bamboo Racing	Mercedes-AMG GT3 Evo	Mercedes-AMG M159 6.2 L V8	33	(Hong Kong) Adderly Fong	1–3, 6
(Hong Kong) Craft-Bamboo Racing	Mercedes-AMG GT3 Evo	Mercedes-AMG M159 6.2 L V8	33	(China) Sun Jingzu	1–3
(Hong Kong) Craft-Bamboo Racing	Mercedes-AMG GT3 Evo	Mercedes-AMG M159 6.2 L V8	33	(Japan) Kakunoshin Ohta	1–2, 5–6
(Hong Kong) Craft-Bamboo Racing	Mercedes-AMG GT3 Evo	Mercedes-AMG M159 6.2 L V8	33	(Chinese Taipei) Jeffrey Lee	3, 5–6
(Hong Kong) Craft-Bamboo Racing	Mercedes-AMG GT3 Evo	Mercedes-AMG M159 6.2 L V8	33	(Australia) Jayden Ojeda	3
(Hong Kong) Craft-Bamboo Racing	Mercedes-AMG GT3 Evo	Mercedes-AMG M159 6.2 L V8	33	(Germany) Tom Kalender	3
(Hong Kong) Craft-Bamboo Racing	Mercedes-AMG GT3 Evo	Mercedes-AMG M159 6.2 L V8	33	(Brazil) João Paulo de Oliveira	5
(Hong Kong) Team Pop Race	Mercedes-AMG GT3 Evo	Mercedes-AMG M159 6.2 L V8	44	(Hong Kong) Marchy Lee	1, 3, 7
(Hong Kong) Team Pop Race	Mercedes-AMG GT3 Evo	Mercedes-AMG M159 6.2 L V8	44	(Hong Kong) Andy Yan	1, 3, 7
(Hong Kong) Team Pop Race	Mercedes-AMG GT3 Evo	Mercedes-AMG M159 6.2 L V8	44	(China) Ho-Pin Tung	1, 3, 7
(Hong Kong) Team Pop Race	Mercedes-AMG GT3 Evo	Mercedes-AMG M159 6.2 L V8	44	(Japan) Daigo Saito	1, 3
(Hong Kong) Team Pop Race	Mercedes-AMG GT3 Evo	Mercedes-AMG M159 6.2 L V8	44	(Hong Kong) Paul Ho	7
(Japan) GTNET MotorSports	Nissan GT-R Nismo GT3	Nissan VR38DETT 3.8 L Twin Turbo V6	81	(Japan) Ryuichiro Ohyagi	3, 5–7
(Japan) GTNET MotorSports	Nissan GT-R Nismo GT3	Nissan VR38DETT 3.8 L Twin Turbo V6	81	(Japan) Natsu Sakaguchi	3, 5–7
(Japan) GTNET MotorSports	Nissan GT-R Nismo GT3	Nissan VR38DETT 3.8 L Twin Turbo V6	81	(Japan) Kohei Tokumasu	3, 5, 7
(Japan) GTNET MotorSports	Nissan GT-R Nismo GT3	Nissan VR38DETT 3.8 L Twin Turbo V6	81	(Japan) Kiyoto Fujinami	3, 6–7
(Japan) GTNET MotorSports	Nissan GT-R Nismo GT3	Nissan VR38DETT 3.8 L Twin Turbo V6	81	(Japan) Iori Kimura	3
(Japan) GTNET MotorSports	Nissan GT-R Nismo GT3	Nissan VR38DETT 3.8 L Twin Turbo V6	81	(Japan) Takayuki Aoki	5
(Japan) Hitotsuyama Racing (R Zero Racing)	Mercedes-AMG GT3 Evo	Mercedes-AMG M159 6.2 L V8	182	(Japan) Masashi Fujii	3–7
(Japan) Hitotsuyama Racing (R Zero Racing)	Mercedes-AMG GT3 Evo	Mercedes-AMG M159 6.2 L V8	182	(United Kingdom) Sean Walkinshaw	3–7
(Japan) Hitotsuyama Racing (R Zero Racing)	Mercedes-AMG GT3 Evo	Mercedes-AMG M159 6.2 L V8	182	(Japan) "Fuzzy"	3–7
(Japan) Hitotsuyama Racing (R Zero Racing)	Mercedes-AMG GT3 Evo	Mercedes-AMG M159 6.2 L V8	182	(Japan) Yuki Fujii	3–7
(Japan) Hitotsuyama Racing (R Zero Racing)	Mercedes-AMG GT3 Evo	Mercedes-AMG M159 6.2 L V8	182	(Japan) Hiroyuki Yamamoto	3
(Japan) Hitotsuyama Racing (R Zero Racing)	Mercedes-AMG GT3 Evo	Mercedes-AMG M159 6.2 L V8	182	(Japan) Mark Sekiya	3
(Japan) Seven x Seven Racing	Porsche 911 GT3 R (992.2)	Porsche M97/80 4.2 L Flat-6	666	(Australia) Brett Boulton	7
(Japan) Seven x Seven Racing	Porsche 911 GT3 R (992.2)	Porsche M97/80 4.2 L Flat-6	666	(Australia) Lachlan Bloxsom	7
(Japan) Seven x Seven Racing	Porsche 911 GT3 R (992.2)	Porsche M97/80 4.2 L Flat-6	666	(Australia) Shane Smollen	7
(Japan) Seven x Seven Racing	Porsche 911 GT3 R (992.2)	Porsche M97/80 4.2 L Flat-6	666	(Australia) Oscar Targett	7
(Japan) D'station Racing	Ferrari 296 GT3 Evo	Ferrari F163CE 3.0 L Twin Turbo V6	777	(Japan) Satoshi Hoshino	All
(Japan) D'station Racing	Ferrari 296 GT3 Evo	Ferrari F163CE 3.0 L Twin Turbo V6	777	(Japan) Tomonobu Fujii	1–4, 6–7
(Japan) D'station Racing	Ferrari 296 GT3 Evo	Ferrari F163CE 3.0 L Twin Turbo V6	777	(Japan) Yuta Kamimura	1, 6–7
(Japan) D'station Racing	Ferrari 296 GT3 Evo	Ferrari F163CE 3.0 L Twin Turbo V6	777	(Japan) Yu Kanamaru	2–5
(Japan) D'station Racing	Ferrari 296 GT3 Evo	Ferrari F163CE 3.0 L Twin Turbo V6	777	(Japan) Tsubasa Kondo	3, 5

=== ST-Z (SRO GT4) ===
Team	Car	Engine	No.	Drivers	Rounds
(Japan) Team Noah	Toyota GR Supra GT4 Evo2	Toyota B58H 3.0 L Twin Turbo I6	5	(Japan) Aruga Tomita	1–3, 5–7
(Japan) Team Noah	Toyota GR Supra GT4 Evo2	Toyota B58H 3.0 L Twin Turbo I6	5	(Japan) Kokoro Morita	1–3, 5–7
(Japan) Team Noah	Toyota GR Supra GT4 Evo2	Toyota B58H 3.0 L Twin Turbo I6	5	(Japan) Aoto Nagahara	1–3, 5–7
(Japan) Team Noah	Toyota GR Supra GT4 Evo2	Toyota B58H 3.0 L Twin Turbo I6	5	(Japan) Kazuya Shimogaki	1–2, 5–7
(Japan) Team Noah	Toyota GR Supra GT4 Evo2	Toyota B58H 3.0 L Twin Turbo I6	5	(Japan) Toshiro Tsukada	3
(Japan) Team Noah	Toyota GR Supra GT4 Evo2	Toyota B58H 3.0 L Twin Turbo I6	5	(Japan) Shigetomo Shimono	3
(Japan) Team Noah	Toyota GR Supra GT4 Evo2	Toyota B58H 3.0 L Twin Turbo I6	5	(Chinese Taipei) Evan Chen	3
(Japan) / Aoyama Gakuin University Automobile Club (Note: Car No. 8 entered as Aoyama Gakuin University Automobile Club, No. 25 entered as Team ZeroOne.); (Japan) / Team ZeroOne	Toyota GR Supra GT4 Evo	Toyota B58H 3.0 L Twin Turbo I6	8	(Japan) Hironobu Shimizu	All
(Japan) / Aoyama Gakuin University Automobile Club; (Japan) / Team ZeroOne	Toyota GR Supra GT4 Evo	Toyota B58H 3.0 L Twin Turbo I6	8	(Japan) Kimiya Sato	All
(Japan) / Aoyama Gakuin University Automobile Club; (Japan) / Team ZeroOne	Toyota GR Supra GT4 Evo	Toyota B58H 3.0 L Twin Turbo I6	8	(Japan) Yuki Tanaka	1–5
(Japan) / Aoyama Gakuin University Automobile Club; (Japan) / Team ZeroOne	Toyota GR Supra GT4 Evo	Toyota B58H 3.0 L Twin Turbo I6	8	(United Kingdom) James Pull	2–7
(Japan) / Aoyama Gakuin University Automobile Club; (Japan) / Team ZeroOne	Toyota GR Supra GT4 Evo	Toyota B58H 3.0 L Twin Turbo I6	8	(Japan) Manabu Yamazaki	6–7
(Japan) / Aoyama Gakuin University Automobile Club; (Japan) / Team ZeroOne	Nissan Z Nismo GT4	Nissan VR30DDTT 3.0 L Twin Turbo V6	25	(Japan) Ryuichiro Otsuka	All
(Japan) / Aoyama Gakuin University Automobile Club; (Japan) / Team ZeroOne	Nissan Z Nismo GT4	Nissan VR30DDTT 3.0 L Twin Turbo V6	25	(Japan) Ryuichiro Tomita	All
(Japan) / Aoyama Gakuin University Automobile Club; (Japan) / Team ZeroOne	Nissan Z Nismo GT4	Nissan VR30DDTT 3.0 L Twin Turbo V6	25	(Japan) Tsugio Matsuda	All
(Japan) / Aoyama Gakuin University Automobile Club; (Japan) / Team ZeroOne	Nissan Z Nismo GT4	Nissan VR30DDTT 3.0 L Twin Turbo V6	25	(Japan) Takuro Shinohara	1–6
(Japan) / Aoyama Gakuin University Automobile Club; (Japan) / Team ZeroOne	Nissan Z Nismo GT4	Nissan VR30DDTT 3.0 L Twin Turbo V6	25	(Italy) Ronnie Quintarelli	3
(Japan) / Aoyama Gakuin University Automobile Club; (Japan) / Team ZeroOne	Nissan Z Nismo GT4	Nissan VR30DDTT 3.0 L Twin Turbo V6	25	(Japan) Masataka Yanagida	3
(Japan) Okabe Jidosha Motorsport	Toyota GR Supra GT4 Evo2	Toyota B58H 3.0 L Twin Turbo I6	15	(Japan) Masaaki Nagashima	1–2, 4–7
(Japan) Okabe Jidosha Motorsport	Toyota GR Supra GT4 Evo2	Toyota B58H 3.0 L Twin Turbo I6	15	(Japan) Seiya Motojima	1–2, 4–7
(Japan) Okabe Jidosha Motorsport	Toyota GR Supra GT4 Evo2	Toyota B58H 3.0 L Twin Turbo I6	15	(Japan) Toru Tanaka	1–2, 4–5
(Japan) Okabe Jidosha Motorsport	Toyota GR Supra GT4 Evo2	Toyota B58H 3.0 L Twin Turbo I6	15	(Japan) Shigetomo Shimono	1, 6–7
(Japan) Okabe Jidosha Motorsport	Toyota GR Supra GT4 Evo2	Toyota B58H 3.0 L Twin Turbo I6	15	(Japan) Masayuki Ueda	2, 4–5, 7
(Japan) Team Impul	Nissan Z Nismo GT4	Nissan VR30DDTT 3.0 L Twin Turbo V6	20	(Japan) Takashi Matsumoto	All
(Japan) Team Impul	Nissan Z Nismo GT4	Nissan VR30DDTT 3.0 L Twin Turbo V6	20	(Japan) Kazuki Oki	All
(Japan) Team Impul	Nissan Z Nismo GT4	Nissan VR30DDTT 3.0 L Twin Turbo V6	20	(Japan) Kazuki Hiramine	All
(Japan) Team Impul	Nissan Z Nismo GT4	Nissan VR30DDTT 3.0 L Twin Turbo V6	20	(France) Jules Kazuki Tréluyer	All
(Japan) Team Impul	Nissan Z Nismo GT4	Nissan VR30DDTT 3.0 L Twin Turbo V6	20	(Belgium) Bertrand Baguette	3
(Japan) Kokusai Group Sports Team	Porsche 718 Cayman GT4 RS Clubsport	Porsche MDG.GA 4.0 L Flat-6	22	(Japan) Ryosuke Kure	1–4, 7
(Japan) Kokusai Group Sports Team	Porsche 718 Cayman GT4 RS Clubsport	Porsche MDG.GA 4.0 L Flat-6	22	(Japan) Rintaro Kubo	1–4, 7
(Japan) Kokusai Group Sports Team	Porsche 718 Cayman GT4 RS Clubsport	Porsche MDG.GA 4.0 L Flat-6	22	(Japan) Shota Kitazono	1–4, 7
(Japan) Kokusai Group Sports Team	Porsche 718 Cayman GT4 RS Clubsport	Porsche MDG.GA 4.0 L Flat-6	22	(Japan) Naoya Yamano	1–4, 7
(Japan) Kokusai Group Sports Team	Porsche 718 Cayman GT4 RS Clubsport	Porsche MDG.GA 4.0 L Flat-6	22	(Japan) Ryoma Henzan	3
(Japan) Kokusai Group Sports Team	Porsche 718 Cayman GT4 RS Clubsport	Porsche MDG.GA 4.0 L Flat-6	22	(Japan) Keishi Ishikawa	3
(Japan) Techno First	Audi R8 LMS GT4 Evo	Audi DKAA 5.2 L V10	34	(Japan) Masaki Kano	All
(Japan) Techno First	Audi R8 LMS GT4 Evo	Audi DKAA 5.2 L V10	34	(Japan) Riki Okusa	All
(Japan) Techno First	Audi R8 LMS GT4 Evo	Audi DKAA 5.2 L V10	34	(Japan) Hironobu Yasuda	All
(Japan) Techno First	Audi R8 LMS GT4 Evo	Audi DKAA 5.2 L V10	34	(Brazil) Igor Omura Fraga	2–3, 5
(Japan) Techno First	Audi R8 LMS GT4 Evo	Audi DKAA 5.2 L V10	34	(Japan) Tadasuke Makino	3
(Japan) Techno First	Audi R8 LMS GT4 Evo	Audi DKAA 5.2 L V10	34	(Japan) Shota Sakai	7
(Japan) Tracy Sports	Toyota GR Supra GT4 Evo2	Toyota B58H 3.0 L Twin Turbo I6	38	(Hong Kong) Terry Chan Kwan	All
(Japan) Tracy Sports	Toyota GR Supra GT4 Evo2	Toyota B58H 3.0 L Twin Turbo I6	38	(Hong Kong) August Fok Wai Ming	All
(Japan) Tracy Sports	Toyota GR Supra GT4 Evo2	Toyota B58H 3.0 L Twin Turbo I6	38	(China) Jason Zhang Zhiqiang	1–5, 7
(Japan) Tracy Sports	Toyota GR Supra GT4 Evo2	Toyota B58H 3.0 L Twin Turbo I6	38	(Japan) Takumi Sanada	2–7
(Japan) Tracy Sports	Toyota GR Supra GT4 Evo2	Toyota B58H 3.0 L Twin Turbo I6	38	(Hong Kong) Sunny Wong Yat Shing	3
(Japan) Tracy Sports	Toyota GR Supra GT4 Evo2	Toyota B58H 3.0 L Twin Turbo I6	38	(Hong Kong) Richard Li Guanghua	3
(Japan) Saitama Green Brave	Toyota GR Supra GT4 Evo2	Toyota B58H 3.0 L Twin Turbo I6	52	(Japan) Kouta Matsui	All
(Japan) Saitama Green Brave	Toyota GR Supra GT4 Evo2	Toyota B58H 3.0 L Twin Turbo I6	52	(Japan) Seita Nonaka	All
(Japan) Saitama Green Brave	Toyota GR Supra GT4 Evo2	Toyota B58H 3.0 L Twin Turbo I6	52	(Japan) Naoki Hattori	All
(Japan) Saitama Green Brave	Toyota GR Supra GT4 Evo2	Toyota B58H 3.0 L Twin Turbo I6	52	(Japan) Hiroki Yoshida	All
(Japan) Saitama Green Brave	Toyota GR Supra GT4 Evo2	Toyota B58H 3.0 L Twin Turbo I6	52	(Japan) Hibiki Taira	3
(Japan) Team YUK (Note: The team was initially entered as Team YUK Hirata-G for rounds 1 and 2. The team has been entered as Team YUK from round 3 onwards.)	Mercedes-AMG GT4	Mercedes-AMG M178 4.0 L Twin Turbo V8	77	(Japan) "Yamatatsu"	1–3, 6–7
(Japan) Team YUK	Mercedes-AMG GT4	Mercedes-AMG M178 4.0 L Twin Turbo V8	77	(Japan) Haruki Kurosawa	1–3, 6–7
(Japan) Team YUK	Mercedes-AMG GT4	Mercedes-AMG M178 4.0 L Twin Turbo V8	77	(Japan) "Cold Max"	1–3, 6–7
(Japan) Team YUK	Mercedes-AMG GT4	Mercedes-AMG M178 4.0 L Twin Turbo V8	77	(Singapore) Joshua Berry (Note: Joshua Berry is an Australian driver competing under a Singaporean license.)	3
(Malaysia) Wing Hin Motorsports Japan	Toyota GR Supra GT4 Evo2	Toyota B58H 3.0 L Twin Turbo I6	338	(Japan) Shuji Maejima	All
(Malaysia) Wing Hin Motorsports Japan	Toyota GR Supra GT4 Evo2	Toyota B58H 3.0 L Twin Turbo I6	338	(Malaysia) Amer Harris	All
(Malaysia) Wing Hin Motorsports Japan	Toyota GR Supra GT4 Evo2	Toyota B58H 3.0 L Twin Turbo I6	338	(Malaysia) Naquib Azlan	1–3, 5–7
(Malaysia) Wing Hin Motorsports Japan	Toyota GR Supra GT4 Evo2	Toyota B58H 3.0 L Twin Turbo I6	338	(Malaysia) Mitchell Cheah Min Jie	3
(Japan) SHADE Racing	Toyota GR Supra GT4 Evo2	Toyota B58H 3.0 L Twin Turbo I6	885	(Japan) Dai Mizuno	All
(Japan) SHADE Racing	Toyota GR Supra GT4 Evo2	Toyota B58H 3.0 L Twin Turbo I6	885	(Japan) Katsuyuki Hiranaka	All
(Japan) SHADE Racing	Toyota GR Supra GT4 Evo2	Toyota B58H 3.0 L Twin Turbo I6	885	(Japan) Yuji Kunimoto	All
(Japan) SHADE Racing	Toyota GR Supra GT4 Evo2	Toyota B58H 3.0 L Twin Turbo I6	885	(Japan) Tsubasa Mekaru	All

=== ST-TCR ===
Team	Car	Engine	No.	Drivers	Rounds
(Japan) Birth Racing Project【BRP】	Cupra León TCR	Cupra DNPA 2.0 L Turbo I4	19	(Japan) Sesshu Kondo	2–7
(Japan) Birth Racing Project【BRP】	Cupra León TCR	Cupra DNPA 2.0 L Turbo I4	19	(Japan) Takeshi Suehiro	2–7
(Japan) Birth Racing Project【BRP】	Cupra León TCR	Cupra DNPA 2.0 L Turbo I4	19	(Japan) Takashi Kochiya	2–7
(Japan) Birth Racing Project【BRP】	Cupra León TCR	Cupra DNPA 2.0 L Turbo I4	19	(Japan) Taiga Imoto	2–3, 5–7
(Japan) Birth Racing Project【BRP】	Cupra León TCR	Cupra DNPA 2.0 L Turbo I4	19	(Japan) Keisuke Ohara	3–4
(Japan) Birth Racing Project【BRP】	Cupra León TCR	Cupra DNPA 2.0 L Turbo I4	19	(Japan) Kazuki Ishii	3
(Japan) M&K Racing	Honda Civic Type R TCR (FL5)	Honda K20C1 2.0 L Turbo I4	97	(Japan) Mitsuhiro Endo	2, 4–7
(Japan) M&K Racing	Honda Civic Type R TCR (FL5)	Honda K20C1 2.0 L Turbo I4	97	(Japan) Ren Sato	2, 4–6
(Japan) M&K Racing	Honda Civic Type R TCR (FL5)	Honda K20C1 2.0 L Turbo I4	97	(Japan) Tomoki Nojiri	2, 4–5, 7
(Japan) M&K Racing	Honda Civic Type R TCR (FL5)	Honda K20C1 2.0 L Turbo I4	97	(Thailand) Thanasiwanat Phongsinnatchaachun	2, 6
(Japan) M&K Racing	Honda Civic Type R TCR (FL5)	Honda K20C1 2.0 L Turbo I4	97	(Japan) Osamu Kondo	4, 7
(Japan) M&K Racing	Honda Civic Type R TCR (FL5)	Honda K20C1 2.0 L Turbo I4	97	(Thailand) Yuranun Olanprasert	7
(Japan) Waimarama Racing	Hyundai Elantra N TCR (2024)	Hyundai G4KH 2.0 L Turbo I4	98	(Japan) Ryusuke Masumoto	7
(Japan) Waimarama Racing	Hyundai Elantra N TCR (2024)	Hyundai G4KH 2.0 L Turbo I4	98	(Japan) Katsumasa Chiyo	7
(Japan) Waimarama Racing	Hyundai Elantra N TCR (2024)	Hyundai G4KH 2.0 L Turbo I4	98	(Japan) "Kizuna"	7
(Japan) Waimarama Racing	Hyundai Elantra N TCR (2024)	Hyundai G4KH 2.0 L Turbo I4	98	(South Korea) Lee Jung-woo	7
(Japan) Hitonowa The Team Standard	Honda Civic Type R TCR (FL5)	Honda K20C1 2.0 L Turbo I4	100	(Japan) Yosuke Yamaki	2, 4–7
(Japan) Hitonowa The Team Standard	Honda Civic Type R TCR (FL5)	Honda K20C1 2.0 L Turbo I4	100	(Japan) Shinji Nakano	2, 4–7
(Japan) Hitonowa The Team Standard	Honda Civic Type R TCR (FL5)	Honda K20C1 2.0 L Turbo I4	100	(Japan) Rintaro Sato	2, 4–7
(Japan) Hitonowa The Team Standard	Honda Civic Type R TCR (FL5)	Honda K20C1 2.0 L Turbo I4	100	(Japan) Koji Yamanishi	2, 4, 6
(Japan) Hitonowa The Team Standard	Honda Civic Type R TCR (FL5)	Honda K20C1 2.0 L Turbo I4	100	(Japan) Yuto Nomura	5, 7
(Japan) Audi Team Show Apex	Audi RS 3 LMS TCR (2017)	Audi CJX 2.0 L Turbo I4	430	(Japan) Genki Nishimura	2–7
(Japan) Audi Team Show Apex	Audi RS 3 LMS TCR (2017)	Audi CJX 2.0 L Turbo I4	430	(Japan) Takahiro Kimura	2–3
(Japan) Audi Team Show Apex	Audi RS 3 LMS TCR (2017)	Audi CJX 2.0 L Turbo I4	430	(Japan) Shohei Oda	2, 4, 6
(Japan) Audi Team Show Apex	Audi RS 3 LMS TCR (2017)	Audi CJX 2.0 L Turbo I4	430	(Japan) Ryosuke Kagami	2, 5–6
(Japan) Audi Team Show Apex	Audi RS 3 LMS TCR (2017)	Audi CJX 2.0 L Turbo I4	430	(Japan) Takuma Miyazono	3–7
(Japan) Audi Team Show Apex	Audi RS 3 LMS TCR (2017)	Audi CJX 2.0 L Turbo I4	430	(Japan) Shota Sakai	3–4
(Japan) Audi Team Show Apex	Audi RS 3 LMS TCR (2017)	Audi CJX 2.0 L Turbo I4	430	(Japan) Hiroki Kokuzawa	3, 7
(Japan) Audi Team Show Apex	Audi RS 3 LMS TCR (2017)	Audi CJX 2.0 L Turbo I4	430	(Japan) Ryusho Konishi	3, 7
(Japan) Audi Team Show Apex	Audi RS 3 LMS TCR (2017)	Audi CJX 2.0 L Turbo I4	430	(Japan) Ryo Taniguchi	5
(Japan) Audi Team Show Apex	Audi RS 3 LMS TCR (2017)	Audi CJX 2.0 L Turbo I4	430	(Japan) Yuki Kirikae	7

=== ST-USA (American produced cars) ===
Team	Car	Engine	No.	Drivers	Rounds
(Japan) Birth Racing Project【BRP】	Ford Mustang Dark Horse R	Ford Coyote 5.0 L V8	250	(Japan) Anna Inotsume	2–7
(Japan) Birth Racing Project【BRP】	Ford Mustang Dark Horse R	Ford Coyote 5.0 L V8	250	(Japan) Takahisa Ohno	2–7
(Japan) Birth Racing Project【BRP】	Ford Mustang Dark Horse R	Ford Coyote 5.0 L V8	250	(Japan) Kouichi Okumura	2–7
(Japan) Birth Racing Project【BRP】	Ford Mustang Dark Horse R	Ford Coyote 5.0 L V8	250	(Japan) Yuzuki Takemoto	2–3, 7
(Japan) Birth Racing Project【BRP】	Ford Mustang Dark Horse R	Ford Coyote 5.0 L V8	250	(Japan) Rina Ito	3–6
(Japan) Birth Racing Project【BRP】	Ford Mustang Dark Horse R	Ford Coyote 5.0 L V8	250	(Japan) Ryoji Matsumoto	3

=== ST-Q ===
The ST-Q class uses development vehicles approved by the STMO, similar to the ADAC NLS in Germany.

Team	Car	Engine	No.	Drivers	Rounds
(Japan) Mazda Spirit Racing	Mazda Roadster (NDERC) CNF Concept	Mazda Skyactiv-G PE-VPS 2.0 L I4	12	(Japan) Hiroshi Kawata	2, 6
(Japan) Mazda Spirit Racing	Mazda Roadster (NDERC) CNF Concept	Mazda Skyactiv-G PE-VPS 2.0 L I4	12	(Japan) Yuui Tsutsumi	2, 6
(Japan) Mazda Spirit Racing	Mazda Roadster (NDERC) CNF Concept	Mazda Skyactiv-G PE-VPS 2.0 L I4	12	(Japan) Ryohei Sakaguchi	2, 6
(Japan) Mazda Spirit Racing	Mazda Roadster (NDERC) CNF Concept	Mazda Skyactiv-G PE-VPS 2.0 L I4	12	(Japan) Ikuo Maeda	2
(Japan) Mazda Spirit Racing	Mazda3 Bio Concept	Mazda Skyactiv-D SH-VPTS 2.2 L I4	55	(Japan) Kazuhiro Terakawa	3, 5, 7
(Japan) Mazda Spirit Racing	Mazda3 Bio Concept	Mazda Skyactiv-D SH-VPTS 2.2 L I4	55	(Japan) Ryohei Sakaguchi	3, 5, 7
(Japan) Mazda Spirit Racing	Mazda3 Bio Concept	Mazda Skyactiv-D SH-VPTS 2.2 L I4	55	(Japan) Yuui Tsutsumi	3, 5, 7
(Japan) Mazda Spirit Racing	Mazda3 Bio Concept	Mazda Skyactiv-D SH-VPTS 2.2 L I4	55	(Japan) Ikuo Maeda	3, 5, 7
(Japan) Mazda Spirit Racing	Mazda3 Bio Concept	Mazda Skyactiv-D SH-VPTS 2.2 L I4	55	(Japan) Hiroshi Kawata	3
(Japan) GR Team ORC Field	Toyota GR Yaris M Concept	Toyota G20E 2.0 L Turbo I4	28	(Japan) Yasuhiro Ogura	1, 3–4, 6–7
(Japan) GR Team ORC Field	Toyota GR Yaris M Concept	Toyota G20E 2.0 L Turbo I4	28	(Japan) Masahiro Sasaki	1, 3–4, 6–7
(Japan) GR Team ORC Field	Toyota GR Yaris M Concept	Toyota G20E 2.0 L Turbo I4	28	(Japan) Takamitsu Matsui	1, 3–4, 6–7
(Japan) GR Team ORC Field	Toyota GR Yaris M Concept	Toyota G20E 2.0 L Turbo I4	28	(Japan) Keizo Kato	1, 3, 7
(Japan) GR Team ORC Field	Toyota GR Yaris M Concept	Toyota G20E 2.0 L Turbo I4	28	(Japan) Sho Tsuboi	3
(Japan) GR Team ORC Field	Toyota GR Yaris M Concept	Toyota G20E 2.0 L Turbo I4	28	(Japan) Ryuta Ukai	3
(Japan) GR Team ORC Field	Toyota GR Yaris M Concept	Toyota G20E 2.0 L Turbo I4	28	(Japan) Daisuke Toyoda	4
(Japan) GR Team ORC Field	Toyota GR Yaris M Concept	Toyota G20E 2.0 L Turbo I4	28	(Japan) "Morizo"	6
(Japan) Toyota Gazoo Rookie Racing	Toyota GR Corolla H2 Concept (Rd.3 & 7); Toyota GR Yaris DAT Racing Concept (Rd.5); Toyota GR86 Future FR Concept (Rd.6)	Toyota G16E-GTS 1.6 L Turbo I3; Toyota G20E 2.0 L Turbo I4; Toyota G20E 2.0 L I4	32	(Japan) Hiroaki Ishiura	3, 5–7
(Japan) Toyota Gazoo Rookie Racing	Toyota GR Corolla H2 Concept (Rd.3 & 7); Toyota GR Yaris DAT Racing Concept (Rd.5); Toyota GR86 Future FR Concept (Rd.6)	Toyota G16E-GTS 1.6 L Turbo I3; Toyota G20E 2.0 L Turbo I4; Toyota G20E 2.0 L I4	32	(Japan) Kazuya Oshima	3, 5–7
(Japan) Toyota Gazoo Rookie Racing	Toyota GR Corolla H2 Concept (Rd.3 & 7); Toyota GR Yaris DAT Racing Concept (Rd.5); Toyota GR86 Future FR Concept (Rd.6)	Toyota G16E-GTS 1.6 L Turbo I3; Toyota G20E 2.0 L Turbo I4; Toyota G20E 2.0 L I4	32	(Japan) "Morizo"	3, 5, 7
(Japan) Toyota Gazoo Rookie Racing	Toyota GR Corolla H2 Concept (Rd.3 & 7); Toyota GR Yaris DAT Racing Concept (Rd.5); Toyota GR86 Future FR Concept (Rd.6)	Toyota G16E-GTS 1.6 L Turbo I3; Toyota G20E 2.0 L Turbo I4; Toyota G20E 2.0 L I4	32	(Japan) Daisuke Toyoda	3, 5
(Japan) Toyota Gazoo Rookie Racing	Toyota GR Corolla H2 Concept (Rd.3 & 7); Toyota GR Yaris DAT Racing Concept (Rd.5); Toyota GR86 Future FR Concept (Rd.6)	Toyota G16E-GTS 1.6 L Turbo I3; Toyota G20E 2.0 L Turbo I4; Toyota G20E 2.0 L I4	32	(Japan) Nirei Fukuzumi	3
(Japan) Toyota Gazoo Rookie Racing	Toyota GR Corolla H2 Concept (Rd.3 & 7); Toyota GR Yaris DAT Racing Concept (Rd.5); Toyota GR86 Future FR Concept (Rd.6)	Toyota G16E-GTS 1.6 L Turbo I3; Toyota G20E 2.0 L Turbo I4; Toyota G20E 2.0 L I4	32	(Japan) Eisuke Sasaki	6
(Japan) Team SDA Engineering	Subaru High Performance X Version II	Subaru FA24 2.4 L Turbo F4	61	(Japan) Kazuhiro Ito	1–3, 5, 7
(Japan) Team SDA Engineering	Subaru High Performance X Version II	Subaru FA24 2.4 L Turbo F4	61	(Japan) Hideki Yamauchi	1–3, 5, 7
(Japan) Team SDA Engineering	Subaru High Performance X Version II	Subaru FA24 2.4 L Turbo F4	61	(Japan) Masafumi Hanazawa	1–2, 5, 7
(Japan) Team SDA Engineering	Subaru High Performance X Version II	Subaru FA24 2.4 L Turbo F4	61	(Japan) Takuto Iguchi	1, 3, 5, 7
(Japan) Team SDA Engineering	Subaru High Performance X Version II	Subaru FA24 2.4 L Turbo F4	61	(Japan) Takuma Kamada	3
(Japan) Team SDA Engineering	Subaru High Performance X Version II	Subaru FA24 2.4 L Turbo F4	61	(Japan) Susumu Ito	3
(Japan) GR Team Spirit	Toyota GR Yaris DAT Racing Concept	Toyota G20E 2.0 L Turbo I4	104	(Japan) Kenta Yamashita	1–3, 5, 7
(Japan) GR Team Spirit	Toyota GR Yaris DAT Racing Concept	Toyota G20E 2.0 L Turbo I4	104	(Japan) Hajime Tadokoro	1–3, 5, 7
(Japan) GR Team Spirit	Toyota GR Yaris DAT Racing Concept	Toyota G20E 2.0 L Turbo I4	104	(Japan) Tokiya Suzuki	1, 3, 5, 7
(Japan) GR Team Spirit	Toyota GR Yaris DAT Racing Concept	Toyota G20E 2.0 L Turbo I4	104	(Japan) "Morizo"	1
(Japan) GR Team Spirit	Toyota GR Yaris DAT Racing Concept	Toyota G20E 2.0 L Turbo I4	104	(Japan) Shunsuke Kohno	2–3, 5, 7
(Japan) GR Team Spirit	Toyota GR Yaris DAT Racing Concept	Toyota G20E 2.0 L Turbo I4	104	(Japan) Kazuhiko Omasa	3
(Japan) GR Team Spirit	Toyota GR Yaris DAT Racing Concept	Toyota G20E 2.0 L Turbo I4	104	(Japan) Yuichi Nakayama	3
(Japan) Team HRC	Honda Civic Type R HRC Concept	Honda HRC-K20C 2.0 L Turbo I4	271	(Japan) Hiroki Otsu	2, 5, 7
(Japan) Team HRC	Honda Civic Type R HRC Concept	Honda HRC-K20C 2.0 L Turbo I4	271	(Japan) Kotaro Shimbara	2, 5, 7
(Japan) Team HRC	Honda Civic Type R HRC Concept	Honda HRC-K20C 2.0 L Turbo I4	271	(Japan) Shion Tsujimoto	2, 5, 7

=== ST-1 (GTC cars) ===
Team	Car	Engine	No.	Drivers	Rounds
(Japan) K's Frontier KTM Cars	KTM X-Bow GTX	Audi DNWA 2.5 L I5	2	(Japan) Taiyo Ida	1–5, 7
(Japan) K's Frontier KTM Cars	KTM X-Bow GTX	Audi DNWA 2.5 L I5	2	(Japan) Hiroki Katoh	1–5, 7
(Japan) K's Frontier KTM Cars	KTM X-Bow GTX	Audi DNWA 2.5 L I5	2	(Japan) Hiroki Yoshimoto	1–5, 7
(Japan) K's Frontier KTM Cars	KTM X-Bow GTX	Audi DNWA 2.5 L I5	2	(Japan) Kazuho Takahashi	1–4
(Japan) K's Frontier KTM Cars	KTM X-Bow GTX	Audi DNWA 2.5 L I5	2	(Japan) Takashi Kobayashi	3
(Japan) D'station Racing	Porsche 911 GT3 Cup (992)	Porsche M97/80 4.0 L F6	47	(Japan) Kenji Hama	1–5, 7
(Japan) D'station Racing	Porsche 911 GT3 Cup (992)	Porsche M97/80 4.0 L F6	47	(Japan) Tatsuya Hoshino	1–5, 7
(Japan) D'station Racing	Porsche 911 GT3 Cup (992)	Porsche M97/80 4.0 L F6	47	(Japan) Tetsuya Tanaka	1–5, 7
(Japan) D'station Racing	Porsche 911 GT3 Cup (992)	Porsche M97/80 4.0 L F6	47	(Japan) Taiga Kabaki	1–5, 7
(Japan) D'station Racing	Porsche 911 GT3 Cup (992)	Porsche M97/80 4.0 L F6	47	(Australia) Jake Parsons	3

=== ST-2 ===
2,400–3,500cc displacement - front-wheel (FWD) and all-wheel drive (AWD) vehicles.

Team	Car	Engine	No.	Drivers	Rounds
(Japan) Shinryo Racing Team	Mitsubishi Lancer Evolution X (CZ4A)	Mitsubishi 4B11T 2.0 L Turbo I4	6	(Japan) Tomohiro Tomimasu	1–4, 6–7
(Japan) Shinryo Racing Team	Mitsubishi Lancer Evolution X (CZ4A)	Mitsubishi 4B11T 2.0 L Turbo I4	6	(Japan) Yasushi Kikuchi	1–4, 6–7
(Japan) Shinryo Racing Team	Mitsubishi Lancer Evolution X (CZ4A)	Mitsubishi 4B11T 2.0 L Turbo I4	6	(Japan) Masazumi Ohashi	1–4, 6–7
(Japan) Shinryo Racing Team	Mitsubishi Lancer Evolution X (CZ4A)	Mitsubishi 4B11T 2.0 L Turbo I4	6	(Japan) Takahiro Matsuzawa	1–4, 7
(Japan) Shinryo Racing Team	Mitsubishi Lancer Evolution X (CZ4A)	Mitsubishi 4B11T 2.0 L Turbo I4	6	(Japan) Turbo Asahi	3
(Japan) Shinryo Racing Team	Mitsubishi Lancer Evolution X (CZ4A)	Mitsubishi 4B11T 2.0 L Turbo I4	7	(Japan) Hitoshi Gotoh	1–4, 6–7
(Japan) Shinryo Racing Team	Mitsubishi Lancer Evolution X (CZ4A)	Mitsubishi 4B11T 2.0 L Turbo I4	7	(Japan) Keisuke Anzai	1–4, 6–7
(Japan) Shinryo Racing Team	Mitsubishi Lancer Evolution X (CZ4A)	Mitsubishi 4B11T 2.0 L Turbo I4	7	(Japan) Kazunari Yoshioka	1–4, 6–7
(Japan) Shinryo Racing Team	Mitsubishi Lancer Evolution X (CZ4A)	Mitsubishi 4B11T 2.0 L Turbo I4	7	(Japan) Kazuaki Kimura	1–4, 6–7
(Japan) Shinryo Racing Team	Mitsubishi Lancer Evolution X (CZ4A)	Mitsubishi 4B11T 2.0 L Turbo I4	7	(Japan) Tatsuya Okahara	3
(Japan) Endless Sports	Toyota GR Yaris (GXPA16)	Toyota G16E-GTS 1.6 L Turbo I3	13	(Japan) Masaya Hanazato	1–4, 6–7
(Japan) Endless Sports	Toyota GR Yaris (GXPA16)	Toyota G16E-GTS 1.6 L Turbo I3	13	(Japan) Mizuki Ishizaka	1–4, 6–7
(Japan) Endless Sports	Toyota GR Yaris (GXPA16)	Toyota G16E-GTS 1.6 L Turbo I3	13	(Japan) Reimei Ito	1–4, 6–7
(Japan) Endless Sports	Toyota GR Yaris (GXPA16)	Toyota G16E-GTS 1.6 L Turbo I3	13	(Japan) Hitoshi Okada	1–4, 6–7
(Japan) HCM Uchino Racing	Honda Civic Type R (FL5)	Honda K20C1 2.0 L Turbo I4	36	(Japan) Jun Doi	1–3, 6–7
(Japan) HCM Uchino Racing	Honda Civic Type R (FL5)	Honda K20C1 2.0 L Turbo I4	36	(Japan) Hirokazu Iwama	1–3, 6–7
(Japan) HCM Uchino Racing	Honda Civic Type R (FL5)	Honda K20C1 2.0 L Turbo I4	36	(Japan) Toshiju Akutsu	1, 3
(Japan) HCM Uchino Racing	Honda Civic Type R (FL5)	Honda K20C1 2.0 L Turbo I4	36	(Japan) "Kentaso"	2–3, 6–7
(Japan) HCM Uchino Racing	Honda Civic Type R (FL5)	Honda K20C1 2.0 L Turbo I4	36	(Japan) Noriaki Uchino	3
(Japan) HCM Uchino Racing	Honda Civic Type R (FL5)	Honda K20C1 2.0 L Turbo I4	36	(Japan) Fumihiko Sato	3
(Japan) HCM Uchino Racing	Honda Civic Type R (FL5)	Honda K20C1 2.0 L Turbo I4	36	(Japan) Takuto Sakai	TBC
(Japan) HCM Uchino Racing	Honda Civic Type R (FL5)	Honda K20C1 2.0 L Turbo I4	36	(Japan) Yasunori Matsumoto	TBC
(Japan) Team Yamato	Honda Civic Type R (FL5)	Honda K20C1 2.0 L Turbo I4	67	(Japan) Ryohei Yasui	1, 4, 7
(Japan) Team Yamato	Honda Civic Type R (FL5)	Honda K20C1 2.0 L Turbo I4	67	(Japan) Shinya Uchiyama	1, 4, 7
(Japan) Team Yamato	Honda Civic Type R (FL5)	Honda K20C1 2.0 L Turbo I4	67	(Japan) Ryo Mukumoto	1, 4, 7
(Japan) Team Yamato	Honda Civic Type R (FL5)	Honda K20C1 2.0 L Turbo I4	67	(Japan) Soichiro Sakurai	TBC
(Japan) Nihon Automobile College	Honda Civic Type R (FL5)	Honda K20C1 2.0 L Turbo I4	72	(Japan) Makoto Kanai	1–4, 6–7
(Japan) Nihon Automobile College	Honda Civic Type R (FL5)	Honda K20C1 2.0 L Turbo I4	72	(Japan) Tetsuya Yamano	1–4, 6–7
(Japan) Nihon Automobile College	Honda Civic Type R (FL5)	Honda K20C1 2.0 L Turbo I4	72	(Japan) Toshiya Nojima	1–4, 6–7
(Japan) Nihon Automobile College	Honda Civic Type R (FL5)	Honda K20C1 2.0 L Turbo I4	72	(Japan) Takumi Minamisawa	3
(Japan) Nihon Automobile College	Honda Civic Type R (FL5)	Honda K20C1 2.0 L Turbo I4	72	(Japan) Hiroki Otsu	3
(Japan) Team Spoon	Honda Civic Type R (FL5)	Honda K20C1 2.0 L Turbo I4	95	(Japan) Kazuomi Komatsu	1–4, 6–7
(Japan) Team Spoon	Honda Civic Type R (FL5)	Honda K20C1 2.0 L Turbo I4	95	(Japan) Syun Koide	1–4, 6–7
(Japan) Team Spoon	Honda Civic Type R (FL5)	Honda K20C1 2.0 L Turbo I4	95	(Japan) Yusuke Mitsui	1–4, 6–7
(Japan) Team Spoon	Honda Civic Type R (FL5)	Honda K20C1 2.0 L Turbo I4	95	(Japan) Hibiki Komatsu	3
(Japan) Team Spoon	Honda Civic Type R (FL5)	Honda K20C1 2.0 L Turbo I4	95	(Japan) Yasunori Nakajima	3
(Japan) KTMS	Toyota GR Yaris (GXPA16)	Toyota G16E-GTS 1.6 L Turbo I3	225	(Japan) Riona Tomishita	1–4, 6–7
(Japan) KTMS	Toyota GR Yaris (GXPA16)	Toyota G16E-GTS 1.6 L Turbo I3	225	(Japan) Rin Arakawa	1–4, 6–7
(Japan) KTMS	Toyota GR Yaris (GXPA16)	Toyota G16E-GTS 1.6 L Turbo I3	225	(Japan) Kiyoshi Umegaki	1–4, 7
(Japan) KTMS	Toyota GR Yaris (GXPA16)	Toyota G16E-GTS 1.6 L Turbo I3	225	(Japan) Shunji Okumoto	3
(Japan) Honda R&D Challenge	Honda Civic Type R (FL5)	Honda K20C1 2.0 L Turbo I4	743	(Japan) Akira Bitoh	1–4, 7
(Japan) Honda R&D Challenge	Honda Civic Type R (FL5)	Honda K20C1 2.0 L Turbo I4	743	(Japan) Hiroki Ishigaki	1–4
(Japan) Honda R&D Challenge	Honda Civic Type R (FL5)	Honda K20C1 2.0 L Turbo I4	743	(Japan) Tensho Kobayashi	1, 3, 7
(Japan) Honda R&D Challenge	Honda Civic Type R (FL5)	Honda K20C1 2.0 L Turbo I4	743	(Japan) Shinichi Katsura	3, 7

=== ST-3 ===
2,400–3,500cc displacement - rear-wheel drive (RWD) vehicles.

Team	Car	Engine	No.	Drivers	Rounds
(Japan) Hitotsuyama Racing	BMW M2 Racing	BMW B48 2.0 L I4	21	(Japan) Kenji Suzuki	1–3, 5, 7
(Japan) Hitotsuyama Racing	BMW M2 Racing	BMW B48 2.0 L I4	21	(Japan) Masashi Fujii	1–2
(Japan) Hitotsuyama Racing	BMW M2 Racing	BMW B48 2.0 L I4	21	(United Kingdom) Sean Walkinshaw	1–2
(Japan) Hitotsuyama Racing	BMW M2 Racing	BMW B48 2.0 L I4	21	(Japan) Munehisa Iijima	1, 3–5, 7
(Japan) Hitotsuyama Racing	BMW M2 Racing	BMW B48 2.0 L I4	21	(Japan) Ryoji Tashiro	2, 4–5
(Japan) Hitotsuyama Racing	BMW M2 Racing	BMW B48 2.0 L I4	21	(Japan) Daisuke Yamawaki	3–5, 7
(Japan) Hitotsuyama Racing	BMW M2 Racing	BMW B48 2.0 L I4	21	(Hong Kong) Frank Yu Siu Fung	3
(Japan) Hitotsuyama Racing	BMW M2 Racing	BMW B48 2.0 L I4	21	(Chinese Taipei) Joe Chi Fang Chuan	3
(Japan) Hitotsuyama Racing	BMW M2 Racing	BMW B48 2.0 L I4	21	(Japan) Shinsuke Umeda	3
(Japan) Hitotsuyama Racing	BMW M2 Racing	BMW B48 2.0 L I4	21	(Japan) Shinichi Takagi	4, 7
(Japan) Tracy Sports with RCIT	Lexus RC 350 (GSC10)	Lexus 2GR-FKS 3.5 L V6	39	(Japan) Yuji Takahashi	1–5, 7
(Japan) Tracy Sports with RCIT	Lexus RC 350 (GSC10)	Lexus 2GR-FKS 3.5 L V6	39	(Japan) Hitoshi Sakai	1–5, 7
(Japan) Tracy Sports with RCIT	Lexus RC 350 (GSC10)	Lexus 2GR-FKS 3.5 L V6	39	(Japan) Shinya Fujita	1–5, 7
(Japan) Tracy Sports with RCIT	Lexus RC 350 (GSC10)	Lexus 2GR-FKS 3.5 L V6	39	(Japan) Takashi Ito	1–5
(Japan) Tracy Sports with RCIT	Lexus RC 350 (GSC10)	Lexus 2GR-FKS 3.5 L V6	39	(Japan) Takemi Takasago	3
(Japan) Tracy Sports with RCIT	Lexus RC 350 (GSC10)	Lexus 2GR-FKS 3.5 L V6	39	(Japan) Kazuya Yasui	3
(Japan) Tracy Sports with RCIT	Lexus RC 350 (GSC10)	Lexus 2GR-FKS 3.5 L V6	39	(Japan) Ren Takahashi	7

=== ST-4 ===
1,500–2,500cc displacement.

Team	Car	Engine	No.	Drivers	Rounds
(Japan) Endless Sports	Toyota GR86 (ZN8)	Toyota FA24D 2.4 L F4	3	(Japan) Hiroyuki Saka	1–4, 6–7
(Japan) Endless Sports	Toyota GR86 (ZN8)	Toyota FA24D 2.4 L F4	3	(Japan) Togo Suganami	1–4, 6–7
(Japan) Endless Sports	Toyota GR86 (ZN8)	Toyota FA24D 2.4 L F4	3	(Japan) Rikuto Kobayashi	1–4, 6–7
(Japan) Endless Sports	Toyota GR86 (ZN8)	Toyota FA24D 2.4 L F4	3	(Japan) Atsushi Shimaya	1–4, 6–7
(Japan) Endless Sports	Toyota GR86 (ZN8)	Toyota FA24D 2.4 L F4	3	(Japan) Daichi Okamoto	3
(Japan) Asano Racing Service	Toyota GR86 (ZN8)	Toyota FA24D 2.4 L F4	18	(Japan) Kazumi Mikami	1–4, 6–7
(Japan) Asano Racing Service	Toyota GR86 (ZN8)	Toyota FA24D 2.4 L F4	18	(Japan) Takeo Asano	1–4, 6–7
(Japan) Asano Racing Service	Toyota GR86 (ZN8)	Toyota FA24D 2.4 L F4	18	(Japan) Tatsuya Minowa	1–4, 6–7
(Japan) Asano Racing Service	Toyota GR86 (ZN8)	Toyota FA24D 2.4 L F4	18	(Japan) Daiki Fujiwara	1–4, 6–7
(Japan) Asano Racing Service	Toyota GR86 (ZN8)	Toyota FA24D 2.4 L F4	18	(Japan) Yuya Nakajima	3
(Japan) Team NOPRO	Mazda Roadster (NC)	Mazda MZR LF-VE 2.0 L I4	37	(Japan) Johnny Ogura	1–4, 6–7
(Japan) Team NOPRO	Mazda Roadster (NC)	Mazda MZR LF-VE 2.0 L I4	37	(Japan) Shunsuke Ozaki	1–4, 6–7
(Japan) Team NOPRO	Mazda Roadster (NC)	Mazda MZR LF-VE 2.0 L I4	37	(Japan) Tobio Otani	1–4, 6–7
(Japan) Team NOPRO	Mazda Roadster (NC)	Mazda MZR LF-VE 2.0 L I4	37	(Japan) Toshihiko Nogami	1
(Japan) Team NOPRO	Mazda Roadster (NC)	Mazda MZR LF-VE 2.0 L I4	37	(Japan) Misaki Konishi	2
(Japan) Team NOPRO	Mazda Roadster (NC)	Mazda MZR LF-VE 2.0 L I4	37	(Japan) Tatsuya Nogami	3–4, 7
(Japan) Team NOPRO	Mazda Roadster (NC)	Mazda MZR LF-VE 2.0 L I4	37	(Japan) Ryu Yamamoto	3
(Japan) Team NOPRO	Mazda Roadster (NC)	Mazda MZR LF-VE 2.0 L I4	37	(Japan) Takashi Oi	3
(Japan) Tracy Sports	Toyota GR86 (ZN8)	Toyota FA24D 2.4 L F4	41	(Japan) Takumi Shima	1–4, 6–7
(Japan) Tracy Sports	Toyota GR86 (ZN8)	Toyota FA24D 2.4 L F4	41	(Japan) Yusuke Tomibayashi	1–4, 6–7
(Japan) Tracy Sports	Toyota GR86 (ZN8)	Toyota FA24D 2.4 L F4	41	(Japan) Yohei Maruyama	1–4, 6–7
(Japan) Tracy Sports	Toyota GR86 (ZN8)	Toyota FA24D 2.4 L F4	41	(Japan) Jun Hashimoto	1, 3
(Japan) Tracy Sports	Toyota GR86 (ZN8)	Toyota FA24D 2.4 L F4	41	(Japan) Yuki Ohta	2–4, 7
(Japan) Tracy Sports	Toyota GR86 (ZN8)	Toyota FA24D 2.4 L F4	41	(Japan) Masataka Inoue	3
(Japan) Team G/Motion	Toyota GR86 (ZN8)	Toyota FA24D 2.4 L F4	60	(Japan) Resshu Shioya	1–4, 6–7
(Japan) Team G/Motion	Toyota GR86 (ZN8)	Toyota FA24D 2.4 L F4	60	(Japan) Hikaru Nakamura	1–4, 6–7
(Japan) Team G/Motion	Toyota GR86 (ZN8)	Toyota FA24D 2.4 L F4	60	(Japan) Masayuki Minato	1–3
(Japan) Team G/Motion	Toyota GR86 (ZN8)	Toyota FA24D 2.4 L F4	60	(Japan) Tomomitsu Senoo	2–3, 6–7
(Japan) Team G/Motion	Toyota GR86 (ZN8)	Toyota FA24D 2.4 L F4	60	(Japan) Shoya Suzuki	3
(Japan) Team G/Motion	Toyota GR86 (ZN8)	Toyota FA24D 2.4 L F4	60	(Japan) Masaru Tomizawa	4, 7
(Japan) Over Drive	Mazda Roadster RF (NDERC)	Mazda Skyactiv-G PE-VPS 2.0 L I4	66	(Japan) Kyosuke Inomata	1–4, 6–7
(Japan) Over Drive	Mazda Roadster RF (NDERC)	Mazda Skyactiv-G PE-VPS 2.0 L I4	66	(Japan) Tatsuya Tanigawa	1–4, 6–7
(Japan) Over Drive	Mazda Roadster RF (NDERC)	Mazda Skyactiv-G PE-VPS 2.0 L I4	66	(Japan) Kunihiro Miyazaki	1–4, 6–7
(Japan) Over Drive	Mazda Roadster RF (NDERC)	Mazda Skyactiv-G PE-VPS 2.0 L I4	66	(Japan) Yuta Fujiwara	1–4
(Japan) Over Drive	Mazda Roadster RF (NDERC)	Mazda Skyactiv-G PE-VPS 2.0 L I4	66	(Japan) Hiyu Ikeuchi	3
(Japan) Over Drive	Mazda Roadster RF (NDERC)	Mazda Skyactiv-G PE-VPS 2.0 L I4	66	(Japan) Takayuki Takechi	3
(Japan) Kizuki MotorSports Division	Toyota GR86 (ZN8)	Toyota FA24D 2.4 L F4	86	(Japan) Takumi Umehara	1–4, 6–7
(Japan) Kizuki MotorSports Division	Toyota GR86 (ZN8)	Toyota FA24D 2.4 L F4	86	(Japan) Subaru Kumeta	1–4, 6–7
(Japan) Kizuki MotorSports Division	Toyota GR86 (ZN8)	Toyota FA24D 2.4 L F4	86	(Japan) Shingo Imai	1–4, 6–7
(Japan) Kizuki MotorSports Division	Toyota GR86 (ZN8)	Toyota FA24D 2.4 L F4	86	(Japan) Keisuke Ohara	1–2
(Japan) Kizuki MotorSports Division	Toyota GR86 (ZN8)	Toyota FA24D 2.4 L F4	86	(Japan) Shinnosuke Ito	3–4, 6–7
(Japan) Kizuki MotorSports Division	Toyota GR86 (ZN8)	Toyota FA24D 2.4 L F4	86	(Japan) Shogo Nishikawa	3
(Japan) Kizuki MotorSports Division	Toyota GR86 (ZN8)	Toyota FA24D 2.4 L F4	86	(Japan) Shun Yamazaki	TBC
(Japan) HMR Racing	Toyota GR86 (ZN8)	Toyota FA24D 2.4 L F4	216	(Japan) Hikaru Jitosho	1–4, 6–7
(Japan) HMR Racing	Toyota GR86 (ZN8)	Toyota FA24D 2.4 L F4	216	(Japan) "Ishiken"	1–4, 7
(Japan) HMR Racing	Toyota GR86 (ZN8)	Toyota FA24D 2.4 L F4	216	(Japan) Kazuma Nishimura	1–3, 6–7
(Japan) HMR Racing	Toyota GR86 (ZN8)	Toyota FA24D 2.4 L F4	216	(Japan) Yuma Shoji	1–2
(Japan) HMR Racing	Toyota GR86 (ZN8)	Toyota FA24D 2.4 L F4	216	(Japan) Hirokuni Kojima	3–4
(Japan) HMR Racing	Toyota GR86 (ZN8)	Toyota FA24D 2.4 L F4	216	(Japan) Ryosuke Moroi	3
(Japan) HMR Racing	Toyota GR86 (ZN8)	Toyota FA24D 2.4 L F4	216	(Japan) Junpei Kato	3
(Japan) HMR Racing	Toyota GR86 (ZN8)	Toyota FA24D 2.4 L F4	216	(Japan) Takashi Inoue	6
(Japan) AutoLabo	Suzuki Swift Sport (ZC33S)	Suzuki K14C 1.4 L Turbo I4	290	(Japan) Kazunori Nishimura	1–4, 6–7
(Japan) AutoLabo	Suzuki Swift Sport (ZC33S)	Suzuki K14C 1.4 L Turbo I4	290	(Japan) Daisuke Ito	1–4, 6–7
(Japan) AutoLabo	Suzuki Swift Sport (ZC33S)	Suzuki K14C 1.4 L Turbo I4	290	(Japan) Daisuke Mori	1–4, 6–7
(Japan) AutoLabo	Suzuki Swift Sport (ZC33S)	Suzuki K14C 1.4 L Turbo I4	290	(Japan) Yuichi Yokoo	2–3
(Japan) AutoLabo	Suzuki Swift Sport (ZC33S)	Suzuki K14C 1.4 L Turbo I4	290	(Japan) Naruo Morikawa	3
(Japan) AutoLabo	Suzuki Swift Sport (ZC33S)	Suzuki K14C 1.4 L Turbo I4	290	(Japan) Shinya Yamamoto	3
(Japan) SHADE Racing	Toyota GR86 (ZN8)	Toyota FA24D 2.4 L F4	884	(Japan) Tatsuya Osaki	1–4, 6–7
(Japan) SHADE Racing	Toyota GR86 (ZN8)	Toyota FA24D 2.4 L F4	884	(Japan) Eijiro Shimizu	1–4, 6–7
(Japan) SHADE Racing	Toyota GR86 (ZN8)	Toyota FA24D 2.4 L F4	884	(Japan) Shinnosuke Yamada	1–4, 6–7
(Japan) SHADE Racing	Toyota GR86 (ZN8)	Toyota FA24D 2.4 L F4	884	(Japan) Morio Nitta	3

=== ST-5 ===
Team	Car	Engine	No.	Drivers	Rounds
5F (1,500cc displacement and below - front-wheel drive (FWD) vehicles.)
(Japan) Team Bride	Honda Fit4 RS (GS4)	Honda L15ZF 1.5 L I4	4	(Japan) Yu Ohta (Note: Both drivers share the same name: father Yuya Ohta entered rounds 1 and 3–5 as OHTA YU in English, son Yuya Ohta entered round 3 as 太田 侑弥 (Ōta Yuya in Japanese).)	1, 3–7
(Japan) Team Bride	Honda Fit4 RS (GS4)	Honda L15ZF 1.5 L I4	4	(Japan) Takao Seto	1, 3–7
(Japan) Team Bride	Honda Fit4 RS (GS4)	Honda L15ZF 1.5 L I4	4	(Japan) Yoshikazu Sobu	1, 3–7
(Japan) Team Bride	Honda Fit4 RS (GS4)	Honda L15ZF 1.5 L I4	4	(Japan) Kuniyuki Haga	1, 3–5, 7
(Japan) Team Bride	Honda Fit4 RS (GS4)	Honda L15ZF 1.5 L I4	4	(Japan) Chikara Kanesaki	3
(Japan) Team Bride	Honda Fit4 RS (GS4)	Honda L15ZF 1.5 L I4	4	(Japan) Yuya Ohta	3
(Japan) Sakae Motor Sports	Honda Fit3 RS (GK5)	Honda L15B 1.5 L I4	11	(Japan) Piston Nishizawa	1, 3–7
(Japan) Sakae Motor Sports	Honda Fit3 RS (GK5)	Honda L15B 1.5 L I4	11	(Japan) Yu Oda	1, 3–7
(Japan) Sakae Motor Sports	Honda Fit3 RS (GK5)	Honda L15B 1.5 L I4	11	(Japan) Hidenori Miwa	1, 3–5, 7
(Japan) Sakae Motor Sports	Honda Fit3 RS (GK5)	Honda L15B 1.5 L I4	11	(Japan) Ryohei Oshima	3–7
(Japan) Sakae Motor Sports	Honda Fit3 RS (GK5)	Honda L15B 1.5 L I4	11	(Japan) Jungo Seto	3
(Japan) Sakae Motor Sports	Honda Fit3 RS (GK5)	Honda L15B 1.5 L I4	11	(Japan) Yusei Yotsukura	3
(Japan) Team NOPRO	Mazda Demio (DE5FS)	Mazda ZY-VE 1.5 L I4	17	(Japan) Misaki Konishi	1, 3–4, 6–7
(Japan) Team NOPRO	Mazda Demio (DE5FS)	Mazda ZY-VE 1.5 L I4	17	(Japan) Yoshihiro Kato	1, 3–4, 6–7
(Japan) Team NOPRO	Mazda Demio (DE5FS)	Mazda ZY-VE 1.5 L I4	17	(Japan) Hiroaki Yamamoto	1, 3–4, 7
(Japan) Team NOPRO	Mazda Demio (DE5FS)	Mazda ZY-VE 1.5 L I4	17	(Japan) Kyohei Kawamura	1, 3
(Japan) Team NOPRO	Mazda Demio (DE5FS)	Mazda ZY-VE 1.5 L I4	17	(Japan) Toshihiko Nogami	3–4, 7
(Japan) Team NOPRO	Mazda Demio (DE5FS)	Mazda ZY-VE 1.5 L I4	17	(Japan) Yoshinari Fujiwara	3
(Japan) Team NOPRO	Mazda Demio (DE5FS)	Mazda ZY-VE 1.5 L I4	17	(Japan) Masahiro Kanda	6
(Japan) Team Yamato	Honda Fit3 RS (GK5)	Honda L15B 1.5 L I4	67	(Japan) Ryohei Yasui	3
(Japan) Team Yamato	Honda Fit3 RS (GK5)	Honda L15B 1.5 L I4	67	(Japan) Shinya Uchiyama	3
(Japan) Team Yamato	Honda Fit3 RS (GK5)	Honda L15B 1.5 L I4	67	(Japan) Ryo Mukumoto	3
(Japan) Team Yamato	Honda Fit3 RS (GK5)	Honda L15B 1.5 L I4	67	(Japan) Soichiro Sakurai	3
(Japan) Honda Cars Tokai	Honda Fit4 RS (GS4)	Honda L15ZF 1.5 L I4	222	(Japan) Toshiki Takeuchi	1 (Note: Car No. 222 was on the provisional entry list for Round 1 but was withdrawn following a crash in practice.)
(Japan) Honda Cars Tokai	Honda Fit4 RS (GS4)	Honda L15ZF 1.5 L I4	222	(Japan) Masayuki Sumi	1
(Japan) Honda Cars Tokai	Honda Fit4 RS (GS4)	Honda L15ZF 1.5 L I4	222	(Japan) Hiroshi Ito	1
(Japan) AutoLabo Racing	Toyota Yaris (MXPA10)	Toyota M15A-FKS 1.5 L I3	291	(Japan) Yuichi Yokoo	1, 4–7
(Japan) AutoLabo Racing	Toyota Yaris (MXPA10)	Toyota M15A-FKS 1.5 L I3	291	(Japan) Naruo Morikawa	1, 4–7
(Japan) AutoLabo Racing	Toyota Yaris (MXPA10)	Toyota M15A-FKS 1.5 L I3	291	(Japan) Shinya Yamamoto	1
(Japan) AutoLabo Racing	Toyota Yaris (MXPA10)	Toyota M15A-FKS 1.5 L I3	291	(Japan) Yuya Yasuhara	4, 7
(Japan) AutoLabo Racing	Toyota Yaris (MXPA10)	Toyota M15A-FKS 1.5 L I3	291	(Japan) Atsuhito Ohtomo	4, 7
(Japan) AutoLabo Racing	Toyota Yaris (MXPA10)	Toyota M15A-FKS 1.5 L I3	291	(Japan) Kazunori Nishimura	5
(Japan) AutoLabo Racing	Toyota Yaris (MXPA10)	Toyota M15A-FKS 1.5 L I3	291	(Japan) Daisuke Mori	5
(Japan) AndLegal Racing	Honda Fit3 RS (GK5)	Honda L15B 1.5 L I4	821	(Japan) Hiroshi Ueda	1, 3–7
(Japan) AndLegal Racing	Honda Fit3 RS (GK5)	Honda L15B 1.5 L I4	821	(Japan) Katsuhiro Sato	1, 3–7
(Japan) AndLegal Racing	Honda Fit3 RS (GK5)	Honda L15B 1.5 L I4	821	(Japan) Tomohiro Uchida	1, 3–4
(Japan) AndLegal Racing	Honda Fit3 RS (GK5)	Honda L15B 1.5 L I4	821	(Japan) Yasuo Kumagai	1, 3, 5
(Japan) AndLegal Racing	Honda Fit3 RS (GK5)	Honda L15B 1.5 L I4	821	(Japan) Suguru Kawana	3, 6–7
(Japan) AndLegal Racing	Honda Fit3 RS (GK5)	Honda L15B 1.5 L I4	821	(Japan) Ryuichi Furuido	3
(Japan) AndLegal Racing	Honda Fit3 RS (GK5)	Honda L15B 1.5 L I4	821	(Japan) Takashi Nara	4–7
(Japan) AndLegal Racing	Honda Fit3 RS (GK5)	Honda L15B 1.5 L I4	822	(Japan) Nanami Tsukamoto	1, 3–7
(Japan) AndLegal Racing	Honda Fit3 RS (GK5)	Honda L15B 1.5 L I4	822	(Japan) Kenta Kawafuku	1, 3–7
(Japan) AndLegal Racing	Honda Fit3 RS (GK5)	Honda L15B 1.5 L I4	822	(Japan) Yuya Egi	1, 3–7
(Japan) AndLegal Racing	Honda Fit3 RS (GK5)	Honda L15B 1.5 L I4	822	(Japan) Suguru Kawana	1, 4–5
(Japan) AndLegal Racing	Honda Fit3 RS (GK5)	Honda L15B 1.5 L I4	822	(Japan) Takashi Nara	3
(Japan) AndLegal Racing	Honda Fit3 RS (GK5)	Honda L15B 1.5 L I4	822	(Japan) Takayuki Maeda	3
(Japan) AndLegal Racing	Honda Fit3 RS (GK5)	Honda L15B 1.5 L I4	822	(Japan) Kenta Minose	3
(Japan) AndLegal Racing	Honda Fit3 RS (GK5)	Honda L15B 1.5 L I4	822	(Japan) Tomohiro Uchida	6–7
5R (1,500cc displacement and below - rear-wheel drive (RWD) vehicles.)
(Japan) Maple Hiroshima Racing Team	Mazda Roadster (ND5RC)	Mazda Skyactiv-G P5-VPS 1.5 L I4	27	(Japan) Toshiyuki Matsuda	1, 3–7
(Japan) Maple Hiroshima Racing Team	Mazda Roadster (ND5RC)	Mazda Skyactiv-G P5-VPS 1.5 L I4	27	(Japan) Yuga Furutani	1, 3–7
(Japan) Maple Hiroshima Racing Team	Mazda Roadster (ND5RC)	Mazda Skyactiv-G P5-VPS 1.5 L I4	27	(Japan) Sota Muto	1, 3–4, 6–7
(Japan) Maple Hiroshima Racing Team	Mazda Roadster (ND5RC)	Mazda Skyactiv-G P5-VPS 1.5 L I4	27	(Japan) Takafumi Katsuki	3, 5
(Japan) Maple Hiroshima Racing Team	Mazda Roadster (ND5RC)	Mazda Skyactiv-G P5-VPS 1.5 L I4	27	(Japan) Shohei Oda	3
(Japan) Maple Hiroshima Racing Team	Mazda Roadster (ND5RC)	Mazda Skyactiv-G P5-VPS 1.5 L I4	27	(Japan) Yasutaka Hinoi	TBC
(Japan) Lovedrive Racing	Mazda Roadster (ND5RC)	Mazda Skyactiv-G P5-VPS 1.5 L I4	50	(Japan) Junko Fujii	3, 5, 7
(Japan) Lovedrive Racing	Mazda Roadster (ND5RC)	Mazda Skyactiv-G P5-VPS 1.5 L I4	50	(Japan) Keita Sawa	3, 5, 7
(Japan) Lovedrive Racing	Mazda Roadster (ND5RC)	Mazda Skyactiv-G P5-VPS 1.5 L I4	50	(Chinese Taipei) Hung Mingwei	3, 5, 7
(Japan) Lovedrive Racing	Mazda Roadster (ND5RC)	Mazda Skyactiv-G P5-VPS 1.5 L I4	50	(Japan) Kazumi Hori	3, 7
(Japan) Lovedrive Racing	Mazda Roadster (ND5RC)	Mazda Skyactiv-G P5-VPS 1.5 L I4	50	(Japan) Osamu Kondo	3
(Japan) Lovedrive Racing	Mazda Roadster (ND5RC)	Mazda Skyactiv-G P5-VPS 1.5 L I4	50	(Japan) Satoshi Konno	3
(Japan) Over Drive	Mazda Roadster (ND5RC)	Mazda Skyactiv-G P5-VPS 1.5 L I4	65	(Japan) Hirohito Ito	1, 3–7
(Japan) Over Drive	Mazda Roadster (ND5RC)	Mazda Skyactiv-G P5-VPS 1.5 L I4	65	(Japan) Takuma Ikeda	1, 3–7
(Japan) Over Drive	Mazda Roadster (ND5RC)	Mazda Skyactiv-G P5-VPS 1.5 L I4	65	(Japan) Chihiro Inagaki	1, 3–7
(Japan) Over Drive	Mazda Roadster (ND5RC)	Mazda Skyactiv-G P5-VPS 1.5 L I4	65	(Japan) Ryohei Yamaichi	1, 3–4, 7
(Japan) Over Drive	Mazda Roadster (ND5RC)	Mazda Skyactiv-G P5-VPS 1.5 L I4	65	(Japan) Tsuyoshi Hirata	3, 5
(Japan) Over Drive	Mazda Roadster (ND5RC)	Mazda Skyactiv-G P5-VPS 1.5 L I4	65	(Japan) Nino Takahashi	3
(Japan) Murakami Motors	Mazda Roadster (ND5RC)	Mazda Skyactiv-G P5-VPS 1.5 L I4	88	(Japan) Tatsuya Ohta	1, 3–7
(Japan) Murakami Motors	Mazda Roadster (ND5RC)	Mazda Skyactiv-G P5-VPS 1.5 L I4	88	(Japan) Sena Kuronuma	1, 3–5, 7
(Japan) Murakami Motors	Mazda Roadster (ND5RC)	Mazda Skyactiv-G P5-VPS 1.5 L I4	88	(Japan) Soichiro Yoshida	1, 3
(Japan) Murakami Motors	Mazda Roadster (ND5RC)	Mazda Skyactiv-G P5-VPS 1.5 L I4	88	(Japan) Hiroyuki Murakami	3–7
(Japan) Murakami Motors	Mazda Roadster (ND5RC)	Mazda Skyactiv-G P5-VPS 1.5 L I4	88	(Japan) Daichi Okamoto	5–7
(Japan) Murakami Motors	Mazda Roadster (ND5RC)	Mazda Skyactiv-G P5-VPS 1.5 L I4	89	(Japan) Mai Hiwatari	3–7
(Japan) Murakami Motors	Mazda Roadster (ND5RC)	Mazda Skyactiv-G P5-VPS 1.5 L I4	89	(Japan) "Makoto"	3–5
(Japan) Murakami Motors	Mazda Roadster (ND5RC)	Mazda Skyactiv-G P5-VPS 1.5 L I4	89	(Japan) Marie Iwaoka	3–4, 7
(Japan) Murakami Motors	Mazda Roadster (ND5RC)	Mazda Skyactiv-G P5-VPS 1.5 L I4	89	(Japan) Koki Ebukuro	3, 5
(Japan) Murakami Motors	Mazda Roadster (ND5RC)	Mazda Skyactiv-G P5-VPS 1.5 L I4	89	(Japan) Kenta Nakagawa	3, 7
(Japan) Murakami Motors	Mazda Roadster (ND5RC)	Mazda Skyactiv-G P5-VPS 1.5 L I4	89	(Japan) Shinichi Uemura	4, 6–7
(Japan) Murakami Motors	Mazda Roadster (ND5RC)	Mazda Skyactiv-G P5-VPS 1.5 L I4	89	(Japan) Naohiro Yonekawa	5–6
(Japan) Club Mazda Spirit Racing	Mazda Roadster (ND5RC)	Mazda Skyactiv-G P5-VPS 1.5 L I4	120	(United States) Hana Burton	1, 3–7
(Japan) Club Mazda Spirit Racing	Mazda Roadster (ND5RC)	Mazda Skyactiv-G P5-VPS 1.5 L I4	120	(Japan) Tsuyoshi Ishitani	1, 3–4, 6
(Japan) Club Mazda Spirit Racing	Mazda Roadster (ND5RC)	Mazda Skyactiv-G P5-VPS 1.5 L I4	120	(Japan) Tatsuhiko Kato	1, 3, 5, 7
(Japan) Club Mazda Spirit Racing	Mazda Roadster (ND5RC)	Mazda Skyactiv-G P5-VPS 1.5 L I4	120	(Japan) Ryo Yamada	1, 3, 6–7
(Japan) Club Mazda Spirit Racing	Mazda Roadster (ND5RC)	Mazda Skyactiv-G P5-VPS 1.5 L I4	120	(Japan) Haruto Miyake	3–6
(Japan) Club Mazda Spirit Racing	Mazda Roadster (ND5RC)	Mazda Skyactiv-G P5-VPS 1.5 L I4	120	(Japan) Yasumasa Yoshida	3–5, 7
(Japan) Koshido Racing	Mazda Roadster (ND5RC)	Mazda Skyactiv-G P5-VPS 1.5 L I4	610	(Japan) Motoharu Sato	1, 3–7
(Japan) Koshido Racing	Mazda Roadster (ND5RC)	Mazda Skyactiv-G P5-VPS 1.5 L I4	610	(Japan) Yusaku Shibata	1, 3–7
(Japan) Koshido Racing	Mazda Roadster (ND5RC)	Mazda Skyactiv-G P5-VPS 1.5 L I4	610	(Japan) Yasuji Asai	1, 3–7
(Japan) Koshido Racing	Mazda Roadster (ND5RC)	Mazda Skyactiv-G P5-VPS 1.5 L I4	610	(Japan) Kengo Yamamoto	1, 3, 5, 7
(Japan) Koshido Racing	Mazda Roadster (ND5RC)	Mazda Skyactiv-G P5-VPS 1.5 L I4	610	(Japan) Kento Omiya	3–4
(Japan) FETS Racing (Note: Entry run by Niwa Racing; FETS is the Japanese pronunciation of FET as a single word rather than as an acronym (フェッツ, Fettsu). It refers to FET System Inc. (F - "Fortune", E - "Encounter", T - "Timing") who own & operate Select Hotels Group-owned chains across Japan, driver Hiroshi Nakamura serves as president/CEO of both companies.)	Mazda Roadster (ND5RC)	Mazda Skyactiv-G P5-VPS 1.5 L I4	888	(Japan) Eiji Niwa	1, 3–7
(Japan) FETS Racing	Mazda Roadster (ND5RC)	Mazda Skyactiv-G P5-VPS 1.5 L I4	888	(Japan) Kentaro Kato	1, 3–7
(Japan) FETS Racing	Mazda Roadster (ND5RC)	Mazda Skyactiv-G P5-VPS 1.5 L I4	888	(Japan) Hiroshi Nakamura	1, 3, 7
(Japan) FETS Racing	Mazda Roadster (ND5RC)	Mazda Skyactiv-G P5-VPS 1.5 L I4	888	(Japan) Taisei Matsubara	1
(Japan) FETS Racing	Mazda Roadster (ND5RC)	Mazda Skyactiv-G P5-VPS 1.5 L I4	888	(Japan) Hiroki Wako	3
(Japan) FETS Racing	Mazda Roadster (ND5RC)	Mazda Skyactiv-G P5-VPS 1.5 L I4	888	(Japan) Issei Takao	3
(Japan) FETS Racing	Mazda Roadster (ND5RC)	Mazda Skyactiv-G P5-VPS 1.5 L I4	888	(Japan) Akira Watanabe	3
(Japan) FETS Racing	Mazda Roadster (ND5RC)	Mazda Skyactiv-G P5-VPS 1.5 L I4	888	(Japan) Junichiro Kasahara	4
(Japan) FETS Racing	Mazda Roadster (ND5RC)	Mazda Skyactiv-G P5-VPS 1.5 L I4	888	(Japan) Hiroki Matsushima	4
(Japan) FETS Racing	Mazda Roadster (ND5RC)	Mazda Skyactiv-G P5-VPS 1.5 L I4	888	(Japan) Toshiro Tsukada	5
(Japan) FETS Racing	Mazda Roadster (ND5RC)	Mazda Skyactiv-G P5-VPS 1.5 L I4	888	(Japan) Tomonori Takahashi	5
(Japan) FETS Racing	Mazda Roadster (ND5RC)	Mazda Skyactiv-G P5-VPS 1.5 L I4	888	(Japan) Michael Tanaka	6
(Japan) FETS Racing	Mazda Roadster (ND5RC)	Mazda Skyactiv-G P5-VPS 1.5 L I4	888	(Japan) Kenta Sugihara	6
(Japan) FETS Racing	Mazda Roadster (ND5RC)	Mazda Skyactiv-G P5-VPS 1.5 L I4	888	(Japan) Koichi Mikami	7

== Race results ==
Round		Circuit	ST-X Winners	ST-Z Winners	ST-TCR Winners	ST-Q Winners	ST-USA Winners
1	R1	Motegi	(Japan) No. 31 apr	Did not participate	Did not participate	No finishers	Did not participate
1	R1	Motegi	(Japan) Hiroaki Nagai (Japan) Naoya Gamou (Japan) Ryo Ogawa (Japan) Koki Saga	Did not participate	Did not participate	No finishers	Did not participate
1	R2	Motegi	(Hong Kong) No. 33 Craft-Bamboo Racing	(Japan) No. 34 Techno First	Did not participate	(Japan) No. 28 GR Team ORC Field	Did not participate
1	R2	Motegi	(China) Sun Jingzu (Japan) Kakunoshin Ohta (Hong Kong) Adderly Fong	(Japan) Masaki Kano (Japan) Riki Okusa (Japan) Hironobu Yasuda	Did not participate	(Japan) Yasuhiro Ogura (Japan) Masahiro Sasaki (Japan) Takamitsu Matsui (Japan) Keizo Kato	Did not participate
2		Suzuka	(Hong Kong) No. 33 Craft-Bamboo Racing	(Japan) No. 22 Kokusai Group Sports Team	(Japan) No. 100 Hitonowa The Team Standard	(Japan) No. 271 Team HRC	(Japan) No. 250 Birth Racing Project【BRP】
2		Suzuka	(China) Sun Jingzu (Japan) Kakunoshin Ohta (Hong Kong) Adderly Fong	(Japan) Ryosuke Kure (Japan) Rintaro Kubo (Japan) Shota Kitazono (Note: Kitazono did not drive in the race, but was part of the entry & joined the team for the podium ceremony.) (Japan) Naoya Yamano	(Japan) Yosuke Yamaki (Japan) Shinji Nakano (Japan) Rintaro Sato (Japan) Koji Yamanishi	(Japan) Hiroki Otsu (Japan) Kotaro Shimbara (Japan) Shion Tsujimoto	(Japan) Anna Inotsume (Japan) Takahisa Ohno (Japan) Kouichi Okumura (Japan) Yuzuki Takemoto
3		Fuji 24H	(Japan) No. 23 TKRI	(Japan) No. 25 Team ZeroOne	(Japan) No. 19 Birth Racing Project【BRP】	(Japan) No. 61 Team SDA Engineering	(Japan) No. 250 Birth Racing Project【BRP】
3		Fuji 24H	(Japan) "Daisuke" (Japan) Tatsuya Kataoka (Japan) Yuhki Nakayama (Japan) Yuya Motojima	(Japan) Ryuichiro Otsuka (Japan) Ryuichiro Tomita (Japan) Takuro Shinohara (Japan) Tsugio Matsuda (Italy) Ronnie Quintarelli (Japan) Masataka Yanagida	(Japan) Sesshu Kondo (Japan) Takeshi Suehiro (Japan) Takashi Kochiya (Japan) Taiga Imoto (Japan) Keisuke Ohara (Japan) Kazuki Ishii	(Japan) Kazuhiro Ito (Japan) Hideki Yamauchi (Japan) Takuto Iguchi (Japan) Takuma Kamada (Japan) Susumu Ito	(Japan) Anna Inotsume (Japan) Takahisa Ohno (Japan) Kouichi Okumura (Japan) Yuzuki Takemoto (Japan) Rina Ito (Japan) Ryoji Matsumoto
4	G2	Sugo	Did not participate		(Japan) No. 19 Birth Racing Project【BRP】	Did not participate	(Japan) No. 250 Birth Racing Project【BRP】
4	G2	Sugo	Did not participate		(Japan) Sesshu Kondo (Japan) Takeshi Suehiro (Japan) Takashi Kochiya (Japan) Keisuke Ohara	Did not participate	(Japan) Anna Inotsume (Japan) Takahisa Ohno (Japan) Kouichi Okumura (Japan) Rina Ito
4	G1	Sugo	(Japan) No. 31 apr	(Japan) No. 52 Saitama Green Brave	Did not participate	(Japan) No. 28 GR Team ORC Field	Did not participate
4	G1	Sugo	(Japan) Ryuta Ukai (Japan) Naoya Gamou (Japan) Ryo Ogawa (Japan) Koki Saga	(Japan) Kouta Matsui (Japan) Seita Nonaka (Japan) Naoki Hattori (Japan) Hiroki Yoshida	Did not participate	(Japan) Yasuhiro Ogura (Japan) Masahiro Sasaki (Japan) Takamitsu Matsui (Japan) Daisuke Toyoda	Did not participate
5		Autopolis	(Japan) No. 23 TKRI	(Japan) No. 25 Team ZeroOne	(Japan) No. 97 M&K Racing	(Japan) No. 104 GR Team Spirit	(Japan) No. 250 Birth Racing Project【BRP】
5		Autopolis	(Japan) "Daisuke" (Japan) Tatsuya Kataoka (Japan) Yuhki Nakayama (Japan) Yuya Motojima	(Japan) Ryuichiro Otsuka (Japan) Takuro Shinohara (Japan) Tsugio Matsuda (Japan) Ryuichiro Tomita	(Japan) Mitsuhiro Endo (Japan) Tomoki Nojiri (Japan) Ren Sato	(Japan) Hajime Tadokoro (Japan) Kenta Yamashita (Japan) Tokiya Suzuki (Japan) Shunsuke Kohno	(Japan) Anna Inotsume (Japan) Takahisa Ohno (Japan) Kouichi Okumura (Japan) Rina Ito
6	G2	Okayama	Did not participate			(Japan) No. 12 Mazda Spirit Racing	Did not participate
6	G2	Okayama	Did not participate			(Japan) Hiroshi Kawata (Japan) Yuui Tsutsumi (Japan) Ryohei Sakaguchi	Did not participate
6	G1	Okayama	(Japan) No. 777 D'station Racing	(Japan) No. 25 Team ZeroOne	(Japan) No. 97 M&K Racing	Did not participate	(Japan) No. 250 Birth Racing Project【BRP】
6	G1	Okayama	(Japan) Satoshi Hoshino (Japan) Tomonobu Fujii (Japan) Yuta Kamimura	(Japan) Ryuichiro Otsuka (Japan) Takuro Shinohara (Japan) Ryuichiro Tomita (Japan) Tsugio Matsuda	(Japan) Mitsuhiro Endo (Japan) Ren Sato (Thailand) Thanasiwanat Phongsinnatchaachun	Did not participate	(Japan) Anna Inotsume (Japan) Takahisa Ohno (Japan) Kouichi Okumura (Japan) Rina Ito
7		Fuji 4H	(Japan) No. 182 Hitotsuyama Racing (R Zero Racing)	(Japan) No. 22 Kokusai Group Sports Team	(Japan) No. 97 M&K Racing	(Japan) No. 271 Team HRC	(Japan) No. 250 Birth Racing Project【BRP】
7		Fuji 4H	(Japan) Masashi Fujii (United Kingdom) Sean Walkinshaw (Japan) "Fuzzy" (Japan) Yuki Fujii	(Japan) Ryosuke Kure (Japan) Rintaro Kubo (Japan) Shota Kitazono (Japan) Naoya Yamano	(Japan) Mitsuhiro Endo (Japan) Tomoki Nojiri (Japan) Osamu Kondo (Thailand) Yuranun Olanprasert	(Japan) Hiroki Otsu (Japan) Kotaro Shimbara (Japan) Shion Tsujimoto	(Japan) Anna Inotsume (Japan) Takahisa Ohno (Japan) Kouichi Okumura (Japan) Yuzuki Takemoto

Round		Circuit	ST-1 Winners	ST-2 Winners	ST-3 Winners	ST-4 Winners	ST-5F Winners	ST-5R Winners
1	R1	Motegi	(Japan) No. 47 D'station Racing	Did not participate	(Japan) No. 39 Tracy Sports with RCIT	(Japan) No. 884 SHADE Racing	(Japan) No. 4 Team Bride	(Japan) No. 88 Murakami Motors
1	R1	Motegi	(Japan) Kenji Hama (Japan) Tatsuya Hoshino (Japan) Tetsuya Tanaka (Japan) Taiga Kabaki	Did not participate	(Japan) Yuji Takahashi (Japan) Takashi Ito (Japan) Hitoshi Sakai (Japan) Shinya Fujita	(Japan) Tatsuya Osaki (Japan) Eijiro Shimizu (Japan) Shinnosuke Yamada	(Japan) Yu Ohta (Japan) Takao Seto (Japan) Kuniyuki Haga (Japan) Yoshikazu Sobu	(Japan) Tatsuya Ohta (Japan) Sena Kuronuma (Japan) Soichiro Yoshida
1	R2	Motegi	(Japan) No. 47 D'station Racing	(Japan) No. 95 Team Spoon	Did not participate			
1	R2	Motegi	(Japan) Kenji Hama (Japan) Tatsuya Hoshino (Japan) Tetsuya Tanaka (Japan) Taiga Kabaki	(Japan) Kazuomi Komatsu (Japan) Syun Koide (Japan) Yusuke Mitsui	Did not participate			
2		Suzuka	(Japan) No. 47 D'station Racing	(Japan) No. 95 Team Spoon	(Japan) No. 39 Tracy Sports with RCIT	(Japan) No. 884 SHADE Racing	Did not participate	
2		Suzuka	(Japan) Kenji Hama (Japan) Tatsuya Hoshino (Japan) Tetsuya Tanaka (Japan) Taiga Kabaki	(Japan) Kazuomi Komatsu (Japan) Syun Koide (Japan) Yusuke Mitsui	(Japan) Yuji Takahashi (Japan) Takashi Ito (Japan) Hitoshi Sakai (Japan) Shinya Fujita	(Japan) Tatsuya Osaki (Japan) Eijiro Shimizu (Japan) Shinnosuke Yamada	Did not participate	
3		Fuji 24H	(Japan) No. 47 D'station Racing	(Japan) No. 13 Endless Sports	(Japan) No. 39 Tracy Sports with RCIT	(Japan) No. 41 Tracy Sports	(Japan) No. 11 Sakae Motor Sports	(Japan) No. 88 Murakami Motors
3		Fuji 24H	(Japan) Kenji Hama (Japan) Tatsuya Hoshino (Japan) Tetsuya Tanaka (Japan) Taiga Kabaki (Australia) Jake Parsons	(Japan) Masaya Hanazato (Japan) Mizuki Ishizaka (Japan) Reimei Ito (Japan) Hitoshi Okada	(Japan) Yuji Takahashi (Japan) Takashi Ito (Japan) Hitoshi Sakai (Japan) Shinya Fujita (Japan) Takemi Takasago (Japan) Kazuya Yasui	(Japan) Takumi Shima (Japan) Yusuke Tomibayashi (Japan) Yohei Maruyama (Japan) Jun Hashimoto (Japan) Yuki Ohta (Japan) Masataka Inoue	(Japan) Piston Nishizawa (Japan) Yu Oda (Japan) Hidenori Miwa (Japan) Ryohei Oshima (Japan) Jungo Seto (Japan) Yusei Yotsukura	(Japan) Hiroyuki Murakami (Japan) Sena Kuronuma (Japan) Soichiro Yoshida (Japan) Tatsuya Ohta
4	G2	Sugo	Did not participate		(Japan) No. 39 Tracy Sports with RCIT	(Japan) No. 3 Endless Sports	(Japan) No. 822 AndLegal Racing	(Japan) No. 88 Murakami Motors
4	G2	Sugo	Did not participate		(Japan) Yuji Takahashi (Japan) Takashi Ito (Japan) Hitoshi Sakai (Japan) Shinya Fujita	(Japan) Hiroyuki Saka (Japan) Togo Suganami (Japan) Rikuto Kobayashi (Japan) Atsushi Shimaya	(Japan) Nanami Tsukamoto (Japan) Kenta Kawafuku (Japan) Yuya Egi (Japan) Suguru Kawana	(Japan) Hiroyuki Murakami (Japan) Sena Kuronuma (Japan) Tatsuya Ohta
4	G1	Sugo	(Japan) No. 2 K's Frontier KTM Cars	(Japan) No. 13 Endless Sports	Did not participate			
4	G1	Sugo	(Japan) Taiyo Ida (Japan) Hiroki Katoh (Japan) Kazuho Takahashi (Japan) Hiroki Yoshimoto	(Japan) Masaya Hanazato (Japan) Mizuki Ishizaka (Japan) Reimei Ito (Japan) Hitoshi Okada	Did not participate			
5		Autopolis	(Japan) No. 2 K's Frontier KTM Cars	Did not participate	(Japan) No. 39 Tracy Sports with RCIT	Did not participate	(Japan) No. 4 Team Bride	(Japan) No. 27 Maple Hiroshima Racing Team
5		Autopolis	(Japan) Taiyo Ida (Japan) Hiroki Katoh (Japan) Hiroki Yoshimoto	Did not participate	(Japan) Yuji Takahashi (Japan) Takashi Ito (Japan) Hitoshi Sakai (Japan) Shinya Fujita	Did not participate	(Japan) Yu Ohta (Japan) Takao Seto (Japan) Kuniyuki Haga (Japan) Yoshikazu Sobu	(Japan) Toshiyuki Matsuda (Japan) Yuga Furutani (Japan) Takafumi Katsuki
6	G2	Okayama	Did not participate	(Japan) No. 225 KTMS	Did not participate	(Japan) No. 41 Tracy Sports	(Japan) No. 4 Team Bride	(Japan) No. 120 Club Mazda Spirit Racing
6	G2	Okayama	Did not participate	(Japan) Riona Tomishita (Japan) Rin Arakawa	Did not participate	(Japan) Takumi Shima (Japan) Yusuke Tomibayashi (Japan) Yohei Maruyama	(Japan) Yu Ohta (Japan) Takao Seto (Japan) Yoshikazu Sobu	(United States) Hana Burton (Japan) Haruto Miyake (Japan) Ryo Yamada (Japan) Tsuyoshi Ishitani
6	G1	Okayama	Did not participate	Did not participate	Did not participate	Did not participate		
7		Fuji 4H	(Japan) No. 2 K's Frontier KTM Cars	(Japan) No. 72 Nihon Automobile College	(Japan) No. 39 Tracy Sports with RCIT	(Japan) No. 884 SHADE Racing	(Japan) No. 822 AndLegal Racing	(Japan) No. 88 Murakami Motors
7		Fuji 4H	(Japan) Taiyo Ida (Japan) Hiroki Katoh (Japan) Hiroki Yoshimoto	(Japan) Makoto Kanai (Japan) Tetsuya Yamano (Japan) Toshiya Nojima	(Japan) Yuji Takahashi (Japan) Hitoshi Sakai (Japan) Shinya Fujita (Japan) Ren Takahashi	(Japan) Tatsuya Osaki (Japan) Eijiro Shimizu (Japan) Shinnosuke Yamada	(Japan) Kenta Kawafuku (Japan) Nanami Tsukamoto (Japan) Yuya Egi (Japan) Tomohiro Uchida	(Japan) Hiroyuki Murakami (Japan) Sena Kuronuma (Japan) Tatsuya Ohta (Japan) Daichi Okamoto

== Championship standings ==
Championship points are awarded in every class with the exception of ST-Q at the end of each event.

Points Systems
Duration	1st	2nd	3rd	4th	5th	6th	7th	8th	9th	10th	≤11th	Pole
3–4 Hours / 500 km	20	15	12	10	8	6	4	3	2	1	0	2
5 Hours / 700 km	30	22.5	18	15	12	9	6	4.5	3	1.5	1	2
≥12 Hours / 1400 km	45	35	27	23	18	13	9	7	5	3	1	2

Notes

- If the final round of the class championship is less than five hours or 700 kilometres, 1.5 times the regular amount of points will be awarded.

=== ST-X ===
Pos	Teams	MRM		SUZ	24H	SUG	AUT	OIC	FSW	Pts
Pos	Teams	R1	R2	SUZ	24H	SUG	AUT	OIC	FSW	Pts
1	(Japan) No. 23 TKRI	4	2	2	1	3	1	4	5	150.5
2	(Japan) No. 31 apr	1	Ret	3	4	1	4	3	4	117.5
3	(Hong Kong) No. 33 Craft-Bamboo Racing	3	1	1	3	Ret	5	5		113
4	(Japan) No. 777 D'station Racing	2	3	4	5	2	Ret	1	3	108
5	(Japan) No. 81 GTNET MotorSports				2		3	2	2	81.25
6	(Japan) No. 182 Hitotsuyama Racing (R Zero Racing)				6	4	2	6	1	68.5
7	(Hong Kong) No. 44 Team Pop Race	Ret	Ret		Ret				6	4.5
8	(Japan) No. 666 Seven x Seven Racing								7	3
Pos	Teams	R1	R2	SUZ	24H	SUG	AUT	OIC	FSW	Pts
Pos	Teams	MRM		SUZ	24H	SUG	AUT	OIC	FSW	Pts

=== ST-Z ===
Pos	Teams	MRM	SUZ	24H	SUG	AUT	OIC	FSW	Pts
1	(Japan) No. 25 Team ZeroOne	3	2	1	6	1	1	3	144.5
2	(Japan) No. 52 Saitama Green Brave	2	11	2	1	2	3	2	126.75
3	(Japan) No. 34 Techno First	1	3	5	4	4	2	6	100.5
4	(Japan) No. 22 Kokusai Group Sports Team	6	1	3	7			1	86
5	(Japan) No. 20 Team Impul	Ret	6	4	5	3	5	4	73.5
6	(Japan) No. 885 SHADE Racing	4	4	6	3	6	6	5	71
7	(Malaysia) No. 338 Wing Hin Motorsports Japan	7	5	11	2	5	4	8	56.25
8	(Japan) No. 8 Aoyama Gakuin University Automobile Club	5	8	7	8	7	8	7	36.5
9	(Japan) No. 5 Team Noah	11	7	10		8	7	9	19
10	(Japan) No. 77 Team YUK	9	9	8			9	11	14.5
11	(Japan) No. 38 Tracy Sports	10	12	9	10	9	10	12	11
12	(Japan) No. 15 Okabe Jidosha Motorsport	8	10		9	10	Ret	10	8.75
Pos	Teams	MRM	SUZ	24H	SUG	AUT	OIC	FSW	Pts

=== ST-TCR ===
Pos	Teams	SUZ	24H	SUG	AUT	OIC	FSW	Pts
1	(Japan) No. 19 Birth Racing Project【BRP】	Ret	1	1	4	2	3	104
2	(Japan) No. 97 M&K Racing	2		Ret	1	1	1	97.5
3	(Japan) No. 100 Hitonowa The Team Standard	1		Ret	3	3	5	66
4	(Japan) No. 430 Audi Team Show Apex	Ret	Ret	2	2	Ret	4	47
5	(Japan) No. 98 Waimarama Racing						2	11.25
Pos	Teams	SUZ	24H	SUG	AUT	OIC	FSW	Pts

=== ST-Q ===
Pos	Teams	MRM		SUZ	24H	SUG	AUT	OIC	FSW	Pts
Pos	Teams	R1	R2	SUZ	24H	SUG	AUT	OIC	FSW	Pts
—	(Japan) No. 28 GR Team ORC Field		1		4	1		2	3	—
—	(Japan) No. 271 Team HRC			1			Ret		1	—
—	(Japan) No. 61 Team SDA Engineering		2	4	1		4		2	—
—	(Japan) No. 104 GR Team Spirit	Ret		3	2		1		5	—
—	(Japan) No. 12 Mazda Spirit Racing			2				1		—
—	(Japan) No. 32 Toyota Gazoo Rookie Racing				3		2	3	6	—
—	(Japan) No. 55 Mazda Spirit Racing				Ret		3		4	—
Pos	Teams	R1	R2	SUZ	24H	SUG	AUT	OIC	FSW	Pts
Pos	Teams	MRM		SUZ	24H	SUG	AUT	OIC	FSW	Pts

=== ST-USA ===
Pos	Teams	SUZ	24H	SUG	AUT	OIC	FSW	Pts
1	(Japan) No. 250 Birth Racing Project【BRP】	1	1	1	1	1	1	172
Pos	Teams	SUZ	24H	SUG	AUT	OIC	FSW	Pts

=== ST-1 ===
Pos	Teams	MRM		SUZ	24H	SUG	AUT	FSW	Pts
Pos	Teams	R1	R2	SUZ	24H	SUG	AUT	FSW	Pts
1	(Japan) No. 47 D'station Racing	1	1	1	1	2	Ret	2	148.75
2	(Japan) No. 2 K's Frontier KTM Cars	Ret	Ret	2	2	1	1	1	134.5
Pos	Teams	R1	R2	SUZ	24H	SUG	AUT	FSW	Pts
Pos	Teams	MRM		SUZ	24H	SUG	AUT	FSW	Pts

=== ST-2 ===
Pos	Teams	MRM	SUZ	24H	SUG	OIC	FSW	Pts
1	(Japan) No. 13 Endless Sports	4	2	1	1	2	6	117
2	(Japan) No. 95 Team Spoon	1	1	4	2	Ret	5	96
3	(Japan) No. 72 Nihon Automobile College	6	3	2	7	3	1	96
4	(Japan) No. 225 KTMS	2	7	3	3	1	8	82.25
5	(Japan) No. 743 Honda R&D Challenge	3	Ret	5	4		2	53.25
6	(Japan) No. 6 Shinryo Racing Team	Ret	4	Ret	8	4	4	37.5
7	(Japan) No. 36 HCM Uchino Racing	5	6	6		6	9	37.5
8	(Japan) No. 7 Shinryo Racing Team	Ret	5	Ret	6	5	3	35
9	(Japan) No. 67 Team Yamato	7			5		7	15
Pos	Teams	MRM	SUZ	24H	SUG	OIC	FSW	Pts

=== ST-3 ===
Pos	Teams	MRM	SUZ	24H	SUG	AUT	FSW	Pts
1	(Japan) No. 39 Tracy Sports with RCIT	1	1	1	1	1	1	172
2	(Japan) No. 21 Hitotsuyama Racing	2	2	2	2	2	2	121.25
Pos	Teams	MRM	SUZ	24H	SUG	AUT	FSW	Pts

=== ST-4 ===
Pos	Teams	MRM	SUZ	24H	SUG	OIC	FSW	Pts
1	(Japan) No. 41 Tracy Sports	4	3	1	4	1	2	116.25
2	(Japan) No. 3 Endless Sports	2	2	3	1	2	8	103.75
3	(Japan) No. 884 SHADE Racing	1	1	6	7	3	1	101
4	(Japan) No. 66 Over Drive	5	4	2	5	5	5	80
5	(Japan) No. 37 Team NOPRO	3	5	5	2	7	6	65.5
6	(Japan) No. 216 HMR Racing	6	6	4	3	6	7	59
7	(Japan) No. 86 Kizuki MotorSports Division	7	7	7	7	4	3	42
8	(Japan) No. 290 AutoLabo	Ret	Ret	8	10	8	4	18.5
9	(Japan) No. 60 Zenyaku With Team G/Motion'	Ret	9	9	6	9	9	17.5
10	(Japan) No. 18 Asano Racing Service	8	8	Ret	9	10	10	11.25
Pos	Teams	MRM	SUZ	24H	SUG	OIC	FSW	Pts

=== ST-5 ===
Pos	Teams	MRM	24H	SUG	AUT	OIC	FSW	Pts
ST-5F
1	(Japan) No. 4 Team Bride	1	4	2	1	1	3	123
2	(Japan) No. 11 Sakae Motor Sports	Ret	1	3	2	3	2	102.75
3	(Japan) No. 821 AndLegal Racing	3	2	4	3	4	4	92.5
4	(Japan) No. 822 AndLegal Racing	5	Ret	1	4	5	1	70
5	(Japan) No. 17 Team NOPRO	2	3	Ret		2	5	63
6	(Japan) No. 291 AutoLabo Racing	4		5	5	6	6	40.5
7	(Japan) No. 67 Team Yamato		Ret					2
—	(Japan) No. 222 Honda Cars Tokai	WD						0
ST-5R
1	(Japan) No. 88 Murakami Motors	1	1	1	2	4	1	142.5
2	(Japan) No. 27 Maple Hiroshima Racing Team	3	3	3	1	3	4	100.5
3	(Japan) No. 610 Koshido Racing	2	2	Ret	4	6	2	82.25
4	(Japan) No. 120 Club Mazda Spirit Racing	5	4	Ret	3	1	5	75
5	(Japan) No. 65 Over Drive	4	7	2	5	2	3	72
6	(Japan) No. 89 Murakami Motors		5	4	6	5	6	49.5
7	(Japan) No. 888 FETS Racing	6	8	5	8	7	7	32.5
8	(Japan) No. 50 Lovedrive Racing		6		7		8	21.25
Pos	Teams	MRM	24H	SUG	AUT	OIC	FSW	Pts
