= Subaru FA engine =

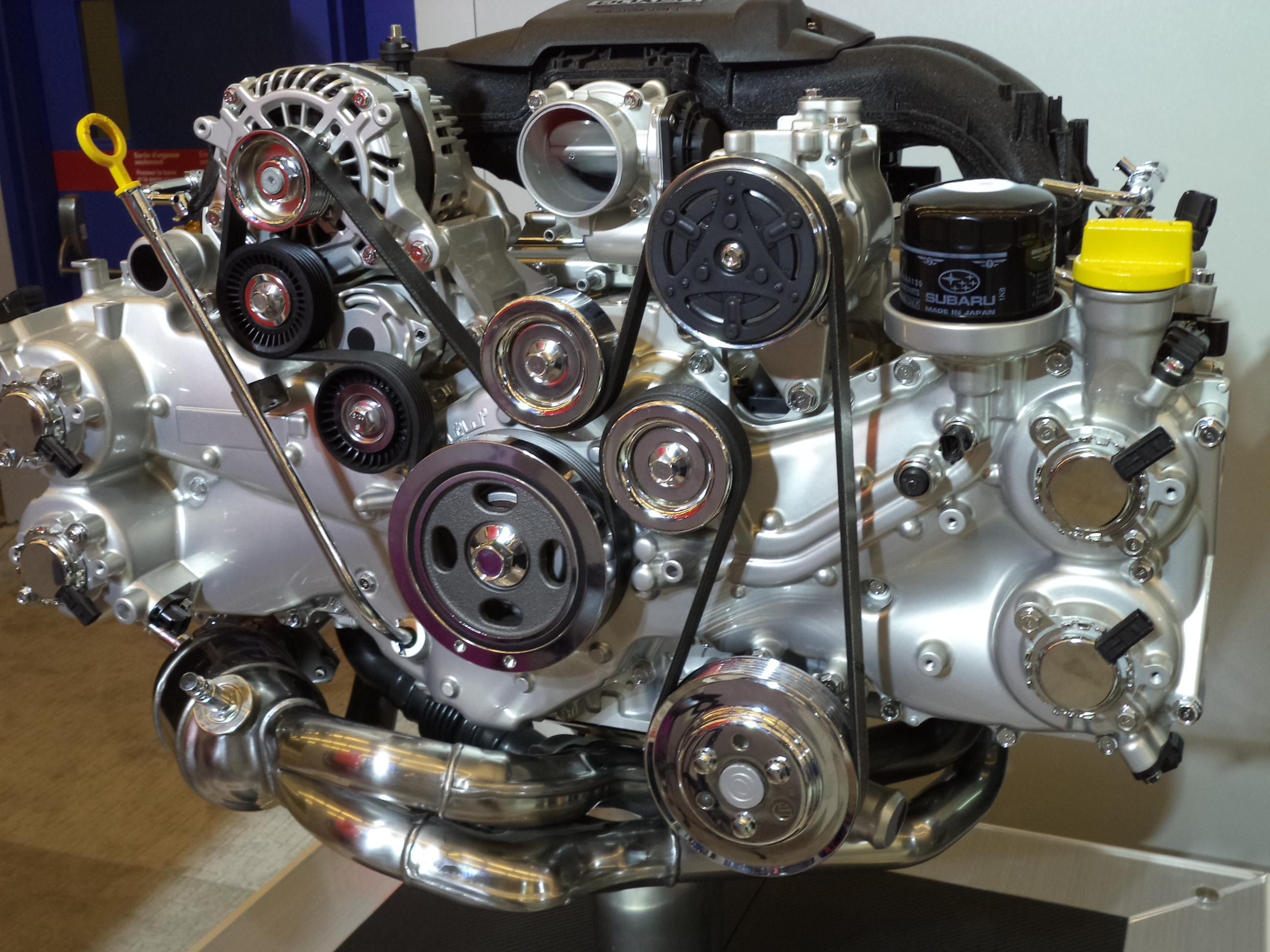

Overview
- Manufacturer: Subaru
- Production: 2012–present

Layout
- Displacement: FA20: 2.0 L (1,998 cc); FA24: 2.4 L (2,387 cc)
- Cylinder bore: 86 mm (3.39 in) (FA20); 94 mm (3.70 in) (FA24)
- Piston stroke: 86 mm (3.39 in)
- Valvetrain: DOHC 4 valves x cyl. with AVCS
- Compression ratio: 10.6:1, 12.5:1

RPM range
- Max. engine speed: 6100–7400 rpm

Combustion
- Turbocharger: Optional with intercooler
- Fuel system: Fuel injection, Direct injection
- Fuel type: Petrol/gasoline
- Cooling system: Water-cooled

Output
- Power output: 200–300 PS (147–221 kW; 197–296 hp)
- Torque output: 205–400 N⋅m (151–295 lb⋅ft; 21–41 kg⋅m)

Chronology
- Predecessor: Subaru FB engine (parent)

The Subaru FA engine is a gasoline boxer-4 engine used in Subaru and Toyota automobiles. It is a derivative of the FB engine, with efforts to reduce weight while maintaining durability as the main design goals. Although the FA and FB engines share a common platform, the FA shares very little in dedicated parts with the FB engine, with a different block, head, connecting rods, and pistons.

== Development ==
The FA series engine was developed for the Subaru BRZ and the first FA engine, the FA20D, was designed to be mounted as low as possible and to minimize the polar moment of the chassis to improve dynamic response and handling. The FA engine features a shallower oil pan and shorter intake manifold to reduce overall engine height compared to the Subaru FB engine. The FA and FB engines share few parts.

A direct injection-only turbo variant of the FA20, the FA20F, was introduced in late 2012 with the 2012 Legacy GT (for the Japanese market) and in the United States, the 2014 model year Subaru Forester. Compression ratio for the turbo engine falls to 10.6:1 from 12.5:1 for the FA20D. A revised variant of the FA20F was introduced for the 2015 model year Subaru WRX; in this application, the camshafts, rocker arms, boost pressure, intercooler, and exhaust were revised to increase peak output.

== FA20 ==
Compared to the FB20 engine, which is undersquare with an 84 mm × 90 mm (3.31 in × 3.54 in) bore and stroke for 2.0 L (1,995 cc) swept displacement, the FA20 is perfectly square with an 86 mm × 86 mm (3.39 in × 3.39 in) bore and stroke for 2.0 L (1,998 cc) swept displacement. The 86 mm (3.39 in) bore and stroke are also reminders of the heritage Toyota model AE86.

Common parameters for all FA20 variants:

- Displacement: 2.0 L (1,998 cc)
- Bore: 86 mm (3.39 in)
- Stroke: 86 mm (3.39 in)

=== FA20D ===
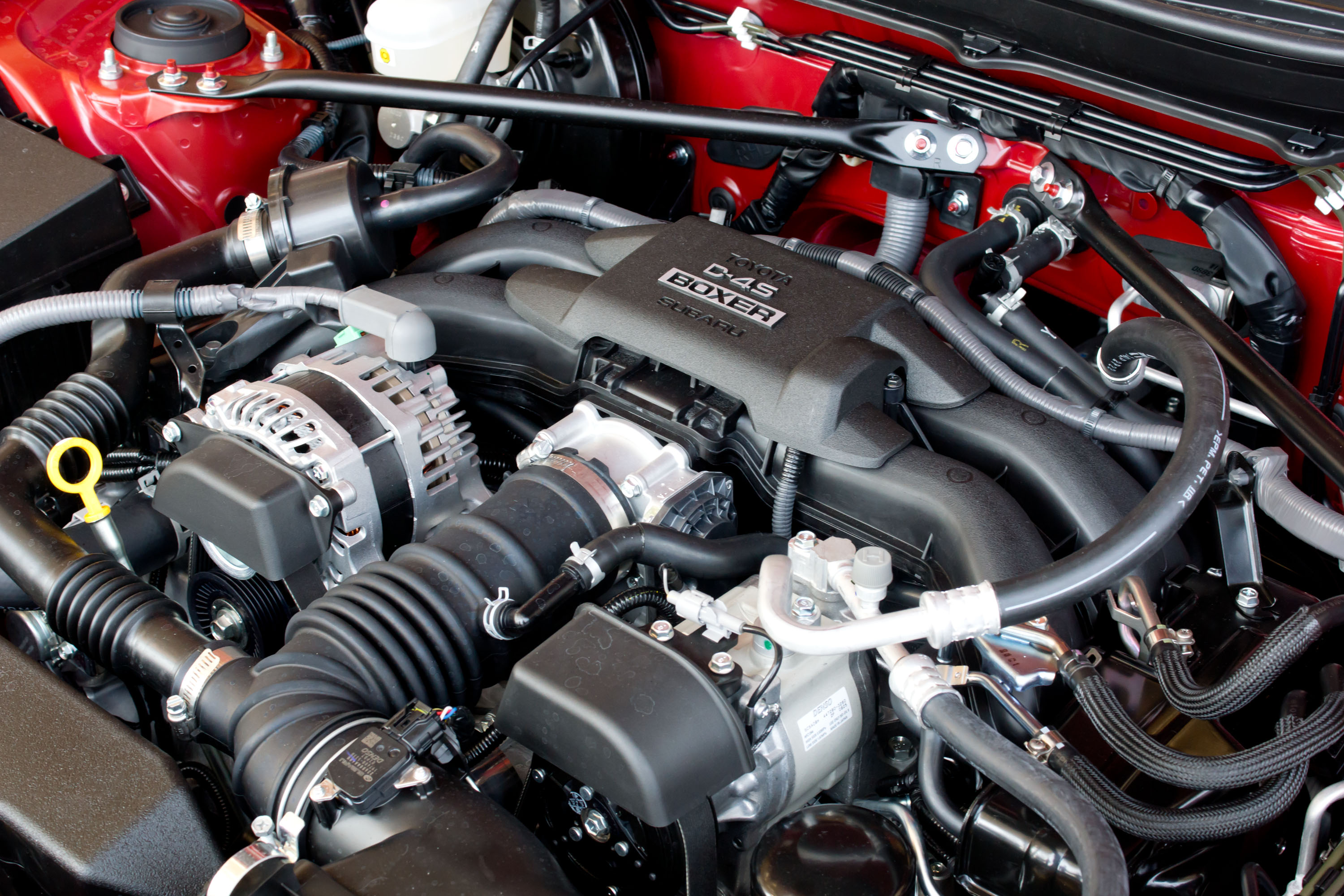
Subaru FA20D

The FA20D features both direct and port injection (Toyota's D-4S injection system) and Subaru AVCS variable valve timing system. It is used in the Subaru BRZ, and is identified by a Toyota engine family code known as the 4U-GSE, which is installed in the Toyota 86 and the Scion FR-S. According to Subaru, 0W-20 oil is recommended.

Wards Auto put the FA20D on their "10 Best Engines" list for 2013.

- Compression Ratio: 12.5:1
- Application: 2012–2016 Subaru BRZ/Toyota GT86
  - Power: 197 hp (147 kW; 200 PS) at 7,000 RPM
  - Torque: 151 lb⋅ft (205 N⋅m; 21 kg⋅m) at 6,400–6,600 RPM
- Application: 2017–2020 Subaru BRZ/Toyota GT86 (manual transmission) (FA20C)
  - Power: 205 hp (153 kW; 208 PS) at 7,000 RPM
  - Torque: 156 lb⋅ft (212 N⋅m; 22 kg⋅m) at 6,400 RPM

=== FA20F ===
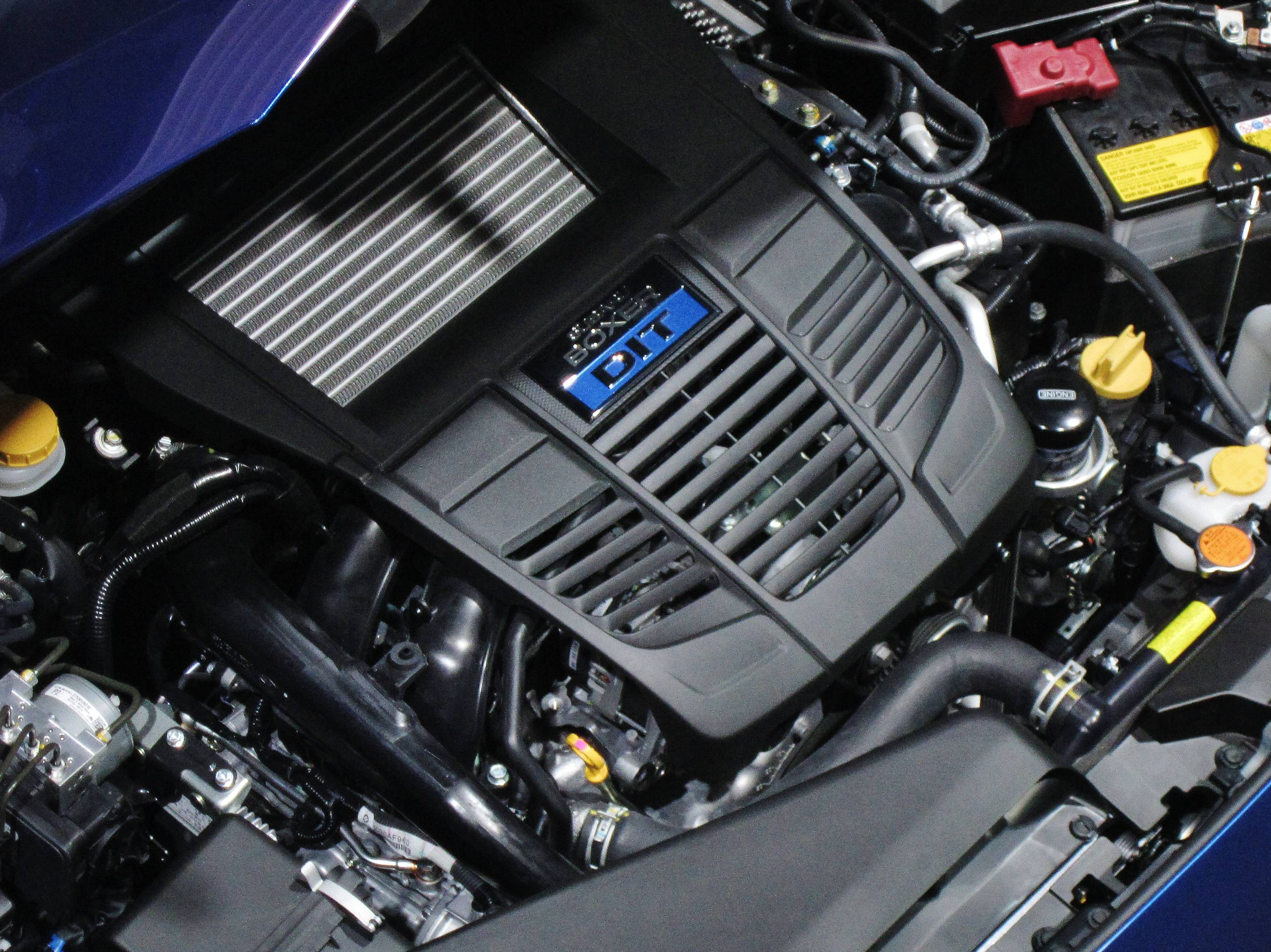
Subaru FA20F

A version with Subaru's own direct fuel injection and twin-scroll turbocharger was introduced in 2012. Also known as the FA20DIT. The FA20F was named to the Wards Auto "10 best engines" list in 2015 and 2016.

- Compression Ratio: 10.6:1
- Assembly: Oizumi, Japan
- Firing Order: 1-3-2-4
- 2012–2014 JDM Subaru Legacy 2.0GT DIT, 2014–2020 Subaru Levorg and 2015–2021 JDM Subaru WRX S4
  - Power: 300 PS (221 kW; 296 hp) at 5,600 RPM
  - Torque: 400 N⋅m (295 lb⋅ft) at 2,000–4,800 RPM
- 2014–2018 USDM Subaru Forester badged as Forester XT:
  - Power: 250 hp (186 kW; 253 PS) at 5,600 RPM
  - Torque: 350 N⋅m (258 lb⋅ft) at 2,000–4,800 RPM
- 2012–2018 JDM Subaru Forester badged as Forester XT:
  - Power: 280 PS (206 kW; 276 hp) at 5,700 RPM
  - Torque: 350 N⋅m (258 lb⋅ft) at 2,000–5,600 rpm
- 2015–2021 USDM Subaru WRX:
  - Power: 268 hp (200 kW; 272 PS) at 5,600 RPM
  - Torque: 350 N⋅m (258 lb⋅ft) at 2,000–5,200 RPM
  - Rev Limit: 6700 RPM

== FA24 ==
Common parameters for all FA24 variants:

- Displacement: 2.4 L (2,387 cc)
- Bore: 94 mm (3.70 in)
- Stroke: 86 mm (3.39 in)

=== FA24F ===
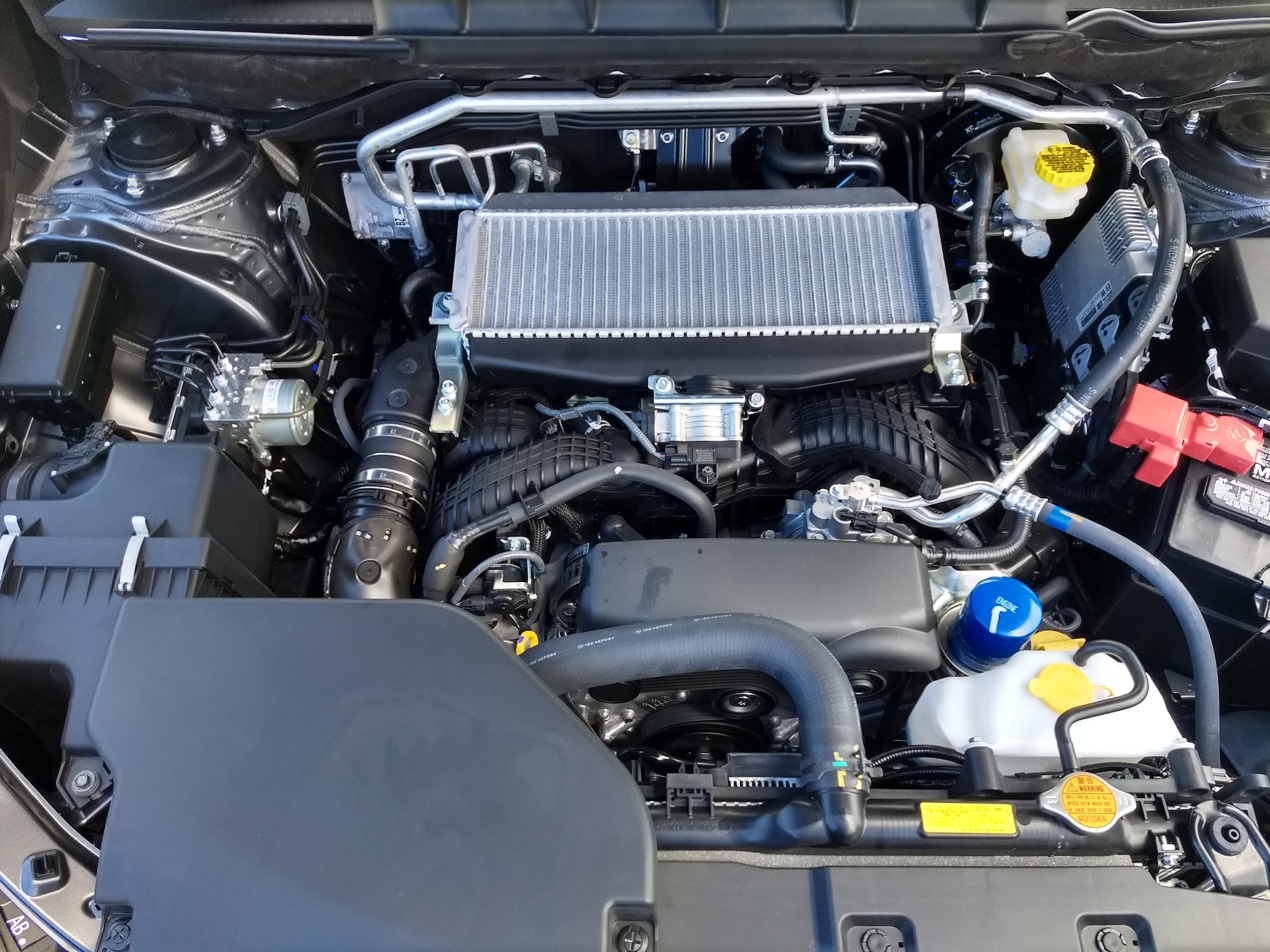
Subaru FA24F

The FA24F was introduced in 2018 initially for the 2019 model year Subaru Ascent. The bore is increased compared to prior FA20 engines, increasing displacement to 2.4 L (2,387 cc). The engine has an all aluminum head and block in order to keep weight and warm-up times low. Direct injection and a turbocharger are used to provide output comparable to a 6-cylinder naturally aspirated engine, and the FA24 uses "regular" (87 AKI) fuel. At the 2019 Chicago Auto Show, Subaru unveiled the 2020 model year Subaru Legacy sedan, available starting in fall 2019 and featuring the FA24 as the uplevel engine option. The 2020 model year Subaru Outback also featured the FA24 as the uplevel option.

The FA24F in the Subaru WRX (VB) features a high-octane tune and mechanical changes to some internal engine components. According to tuners, the FA24F in the WRX makes about 265 hp and 265-270 lb of torque at the wheels on a dynojet dyno.

- Compression Ratio: 10.6:1
- 2019+ USDM Subaru Ascent, 2020+ USDM Subaru Legacy badged as Legacy XT and Sport, 2020+ USDM Subaru Outback badged as Outback XT, and 2022+ USDM Subaru Outback badged as Outback Wilderness
  - Power: 260 hp (194 kW; 264 PS) at 5,600 RPM
  - Torque: 277 lb⋅ft (376 N⋅m; 38 kg⋅m) at 2,000–4,800 RPM
- 2022+ Global Subaru WRX, 2022+ Global Subaru Levorg badged as WRX Sportswagon/WRX GT
  - Power: 271 hp (202 kW; 275 PS) at 5,600 RPM
  - Torque: 258 lb⋅ft (350 N⋅m; 36 kg⋅m) at 2,000–4,800 RPM
- 2022+ JDM Subaru WRX S4, 2022+ JDM Subaru Levorg badged as STi Sport R
  - Power: 271 hp (202 kW; 275 PS) at 5,600 RPM
  - Torque: 277 lb⋅ft (376 N⋅m; 38 kg⋅m) at 2,000–4,800 RPM
- 2023+ AUDM Subaru Outback badged as Outback XT
  - Power: 245 hp (248 PS; 183 kW) at 5,200–6,000 RPM
  - Torque: 258 lb⋅ft (350 N⋅m; 35.7 kg⋅m) at 2,000–4,800 RPM

=== FA24D ===
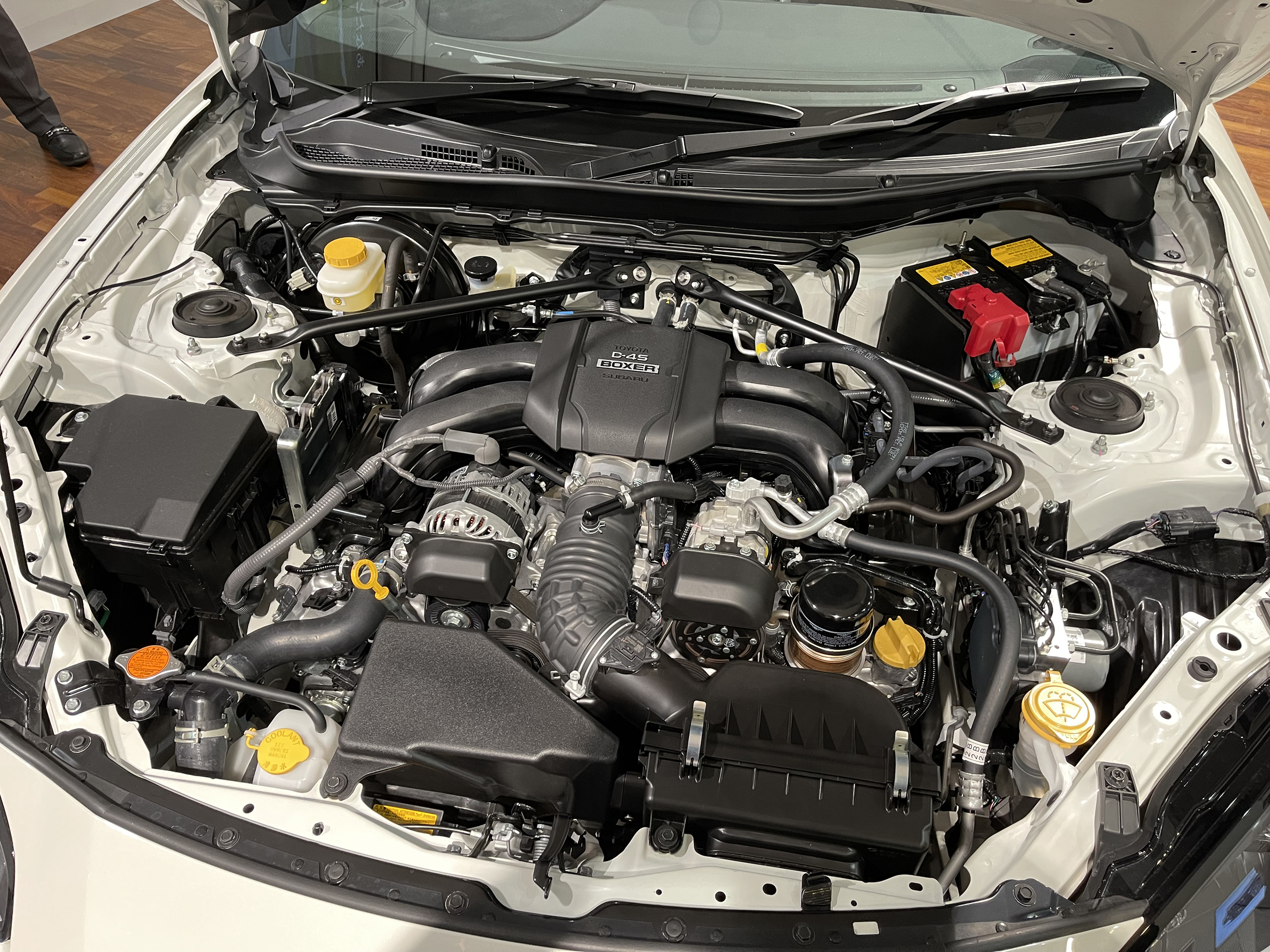
FA24D engine

Like the preceding FA20D, the FA24D uses the Toyota D-4S fuel injection system, which combines direct and port injection. It has the same displacement as the FA24F turbocharged engine with an identical 94×86 mm bore and stroke, but the compression level is increased to 12.5:1. Fitting the existing FA24F, with its bottom-mounted turbo, to the second generation Subaru BRZ/Toyota 86 would have required raising the price and overall center of gravity, so natural aspiration was chosen instead. The torque curve was revised, with peak torque coming at a lower engine speed in the FA24D, and without the significant torque decrease between 3,000 and 5,000 RPM exhibited by the FA20D, which resulted from tuning that engine for fuel economy. In addition, an oil cooler has been added to the engine. One important difference is that the 2022 Toyota GR86 engine requires an oil that meets the ILSAC GF-5 standard while the 2023 GR86 engine requires ILSAC GF-6A, while in markets like Australia the 2022 Subaru BRZ still allows ILSAC GF-5 and additionally allows older ACEA A3 and A5.

- Compression Ratio: 12.5:1
- 2022+ Subaru BRZ/Toyota GR86
  - Power: 170–174 kW; 231–237 PS (228–234 hp)^{[note]} at 7,000 RPM
  - Torque: 250 N⋅m (25.5 kg⋅m; 184.4 lb⋅ft) at 3,700 RPM

The engine is fitted with an additional carbon filter in some regions which slightly restricts the intake.
