= Spoon Sports =

Automotive company in Japan

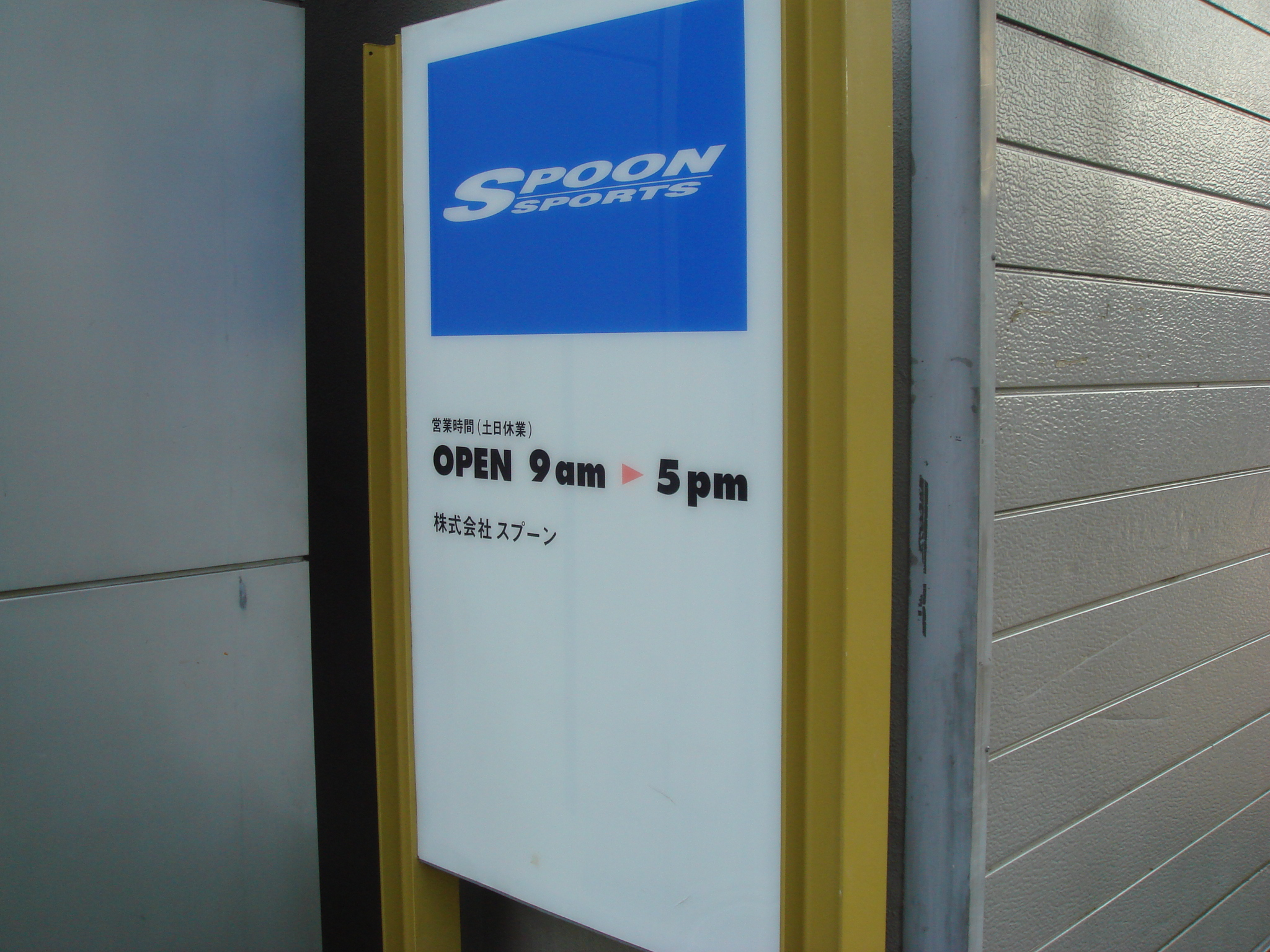
- Industry: Automotive industry
- Founded: 1988
- Founder: Tatsuru Ichishima
- Headquarters: 5-2-8 Ogikubo Suginami, Tokyo, Japan
- Website: https://www.spoonsports.jp/

Spoon Inc., commonly known as Spoon Sports, is a Japanese company specializing in engine tuning and aftermarket parts designed to make Honda cars high performing vehicles. The company's Type One showroom has helped Honda vehicles become major contenders in motorsports competitions. These included the models that participated in the Tsukuba 9 Hours Endurance Race, the Super Taikyu, and Nürburgring 24 Hours.

== Background ==
In 1988, Spoon Inc. was founded by Tatsuru Ichishima, who previously worked for Honda as a race car tester and driver. His decision to set up the company had the backing of Honda and Mugen. Honda's support came in exchange for racing data. The startup originated from the Honda Civic E-AT, which Ichishima owned and modified. This vehicle became the basis of Spoon's racing concept and philosophy that guide the company until today. The company caters to car owners who seek higher performance lacking in their vehicles amid Honda's shift towards eco-friendly technology.

Spoon Inc. is known for its tuning parts, which - like those produced by Toda Racing - are popular for their naturally aspirated performance. This type of tuner is noted for its aggressive side and the requirement for valvetrain upgrades. The company is also known for producing aftermarket parts such as powertrain, suspension, aero-parts (supplemental pieces added to the body to improve aesthetics or aerodynamics), wheels, drivetrain, braking system, and cooling system.

== Notable modifications ==
=== Race cars ===
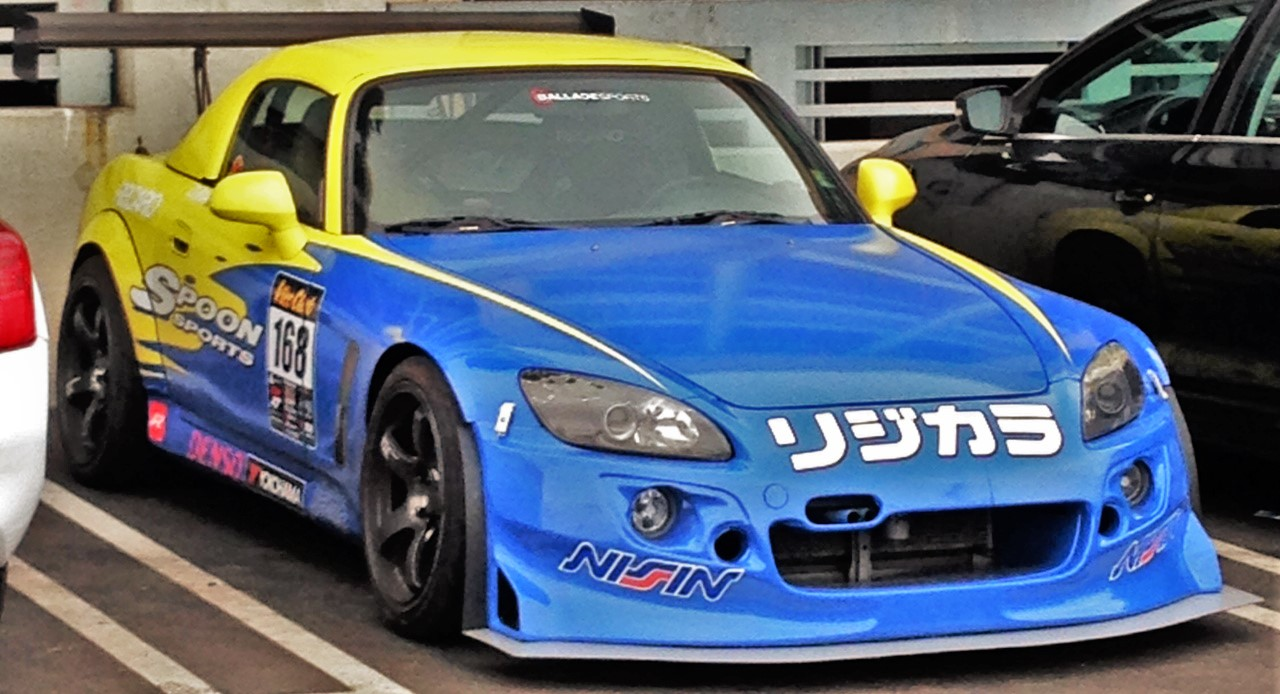
A Honda S2000 modified for racing with the iconic blue and yellow theme.

Spoon has been credited for making Honda a contender in motorsports through its racing modifications. In Japan, Spoon Sports is particularly recognized as a leader in time attack and performance using Honda vehicles such as the Integra Type R, NSX, the S2000, and the Civic. The very first racing car attributed to Spoon Sports was Ichisima's own Honda Civic E-AT. The vehicle, which became the basis of Spoon, participated in the Japan Touring Car Championship. It held the distinction of the first Honda Civic to join the race.

In 2008, Spoon launched the Spoon Honda NSX-R GT, which is based on the first-generation, 2002 Honda NSX-R. This vehicle was modified to meet the requirements of the Japanese Super GT racing regulations. In 2017, Spoon Sports fielded the Unlimited Class FD2 Honda Civic Type R, which set a record lap during the Global Time Attack at the Buttonwillow Raceway Park. The company modified this vehicle as a front-wheel-drive racing car with Formula 1-style center-seating position.

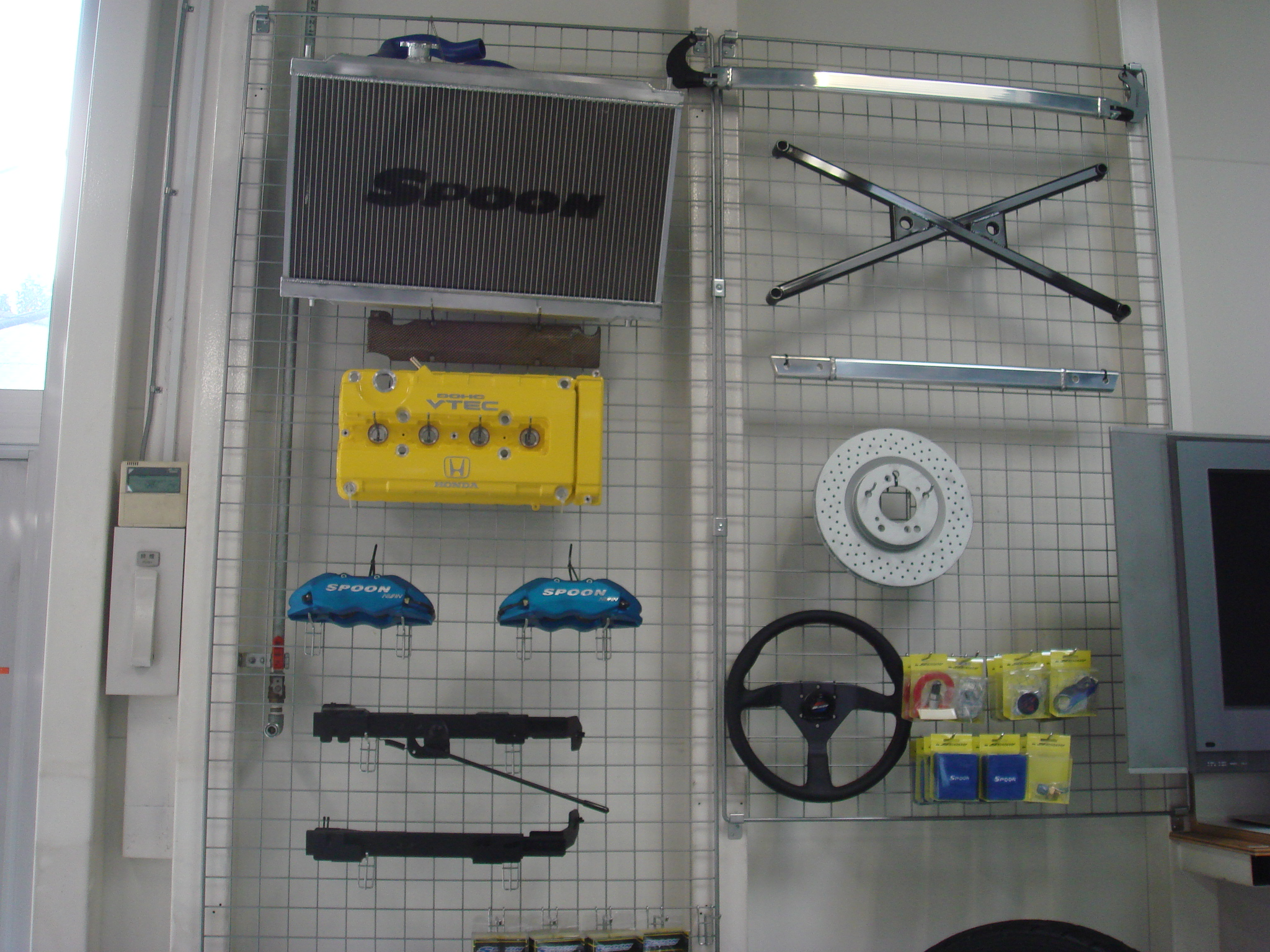
Spoon Sports aftermarket automotive parts.

In the course of its 20-year racing history, Spoon has distinguished itself in endurance racing, excelling in events like the 24-hour Nürburgring, the 25-hour Thunderhill, and Super Taikyu.

Spoon-themed race cars are distinguished by a combination of blue and yellow livery while road cars are typically in white. The race car color scheme, however, is increasingly getting more diversified after Spoon raced the S2000 in 2012.

=== Aftermarket parts ===
Spoon has also produced iconic aftermarket parts such as the Spoon SW388, a lightweight aluminum forged wheel. This wheel is comparable to the Volk Racing TE37 in terms of popularity, and is noted for its five-spoke design. The company is also known for its more radical synchronized gear kits for vehicle transmission, noted for its extremely close ratio. The Momo steering wheel, which it developed with the Italian car accessories company Momo, is another popular Spoon product around the world. These aftermarket parts also extend to aerodynamic body kits, with the very aggressive crane-like front end to signify their brand name of spoon. The most clear example of such would be the FK8 Civic Type-R, when looked at certain angles it can resemble a crane as well as their Wing being trademarked as a Crane-styled Wing. Spoon is more focused on the balance of a car on the track rather than making extreme power.

== Racing ==
Spoon has been racing Honda cars throughout its history. The company's achievements include winning the Super Taikyu ST-4 class championship, class wins at the Nürburgring 24 Hours, Tokachi 24 Hours, 25 Hours of Thunderhill, and Tsukuba 9 Hours, as well as class podiums at the Macau Grand Prix.

== Type One ==
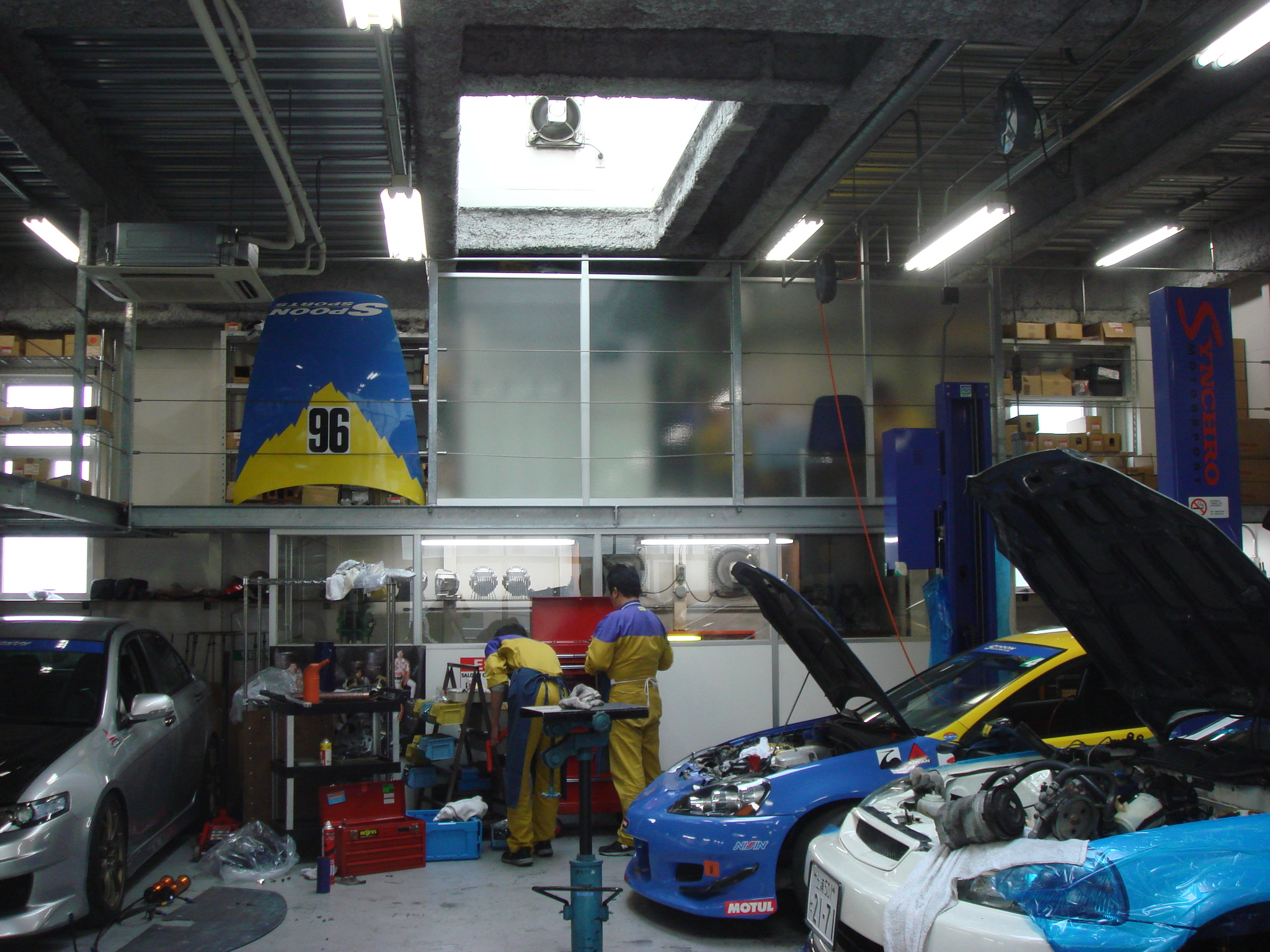
Type One showroom.

Spoon's headquarters is mainly used as the main office, stocking of parts, and distribution. The company opened Type One in 2001 according to a differentiation strategy where Spoon functions as a research and development of parts and tuning while Type One serves as a tuning shop for servicing and tuning cars. All of Spoon's products are on display at the Type One showroom and factory as well as the race cars that it has fielded through the years. Engines are modified in this facility to be beyond factory specifications.

Spoon also buys and resells Honda vehicles at Type One, turning these into bespoke cars such as the left-hand-drive NSX Type Rs. The company provides maintenance and repair services at Type One.
