= 2025 Autopolis GT 3 Hours =

The layout of Autopolis, where the race was held

The 2025 Autopolis GT 300km was the seventh round of the 2025 Super GT Series. It was held at Autopolis in Kamitsue, Ōita Prefecture, Japan on October 19, 2025.

The GT500 category was won by Tadasuke Makino and Naoki Yamamoto in the #100 Stanley Team Kunimitsu Honda Civic Type R-GT, whilst Kiyoto Fujinami, Harry King and Tsubasa Kondo won the GT300 category in the #60 Seven x Seven Racing Porsche 911 GT3 R (992).

== Race ==
=== Race results ===
Class winners denoted in bold.

Pos	No	Entrant	Drivers	Chassis	Tyre	Laps	Time/Retired
GT500
1	**100**	**Stanley Team Kunimitsu**	**(Japan) Tadasuke Makino** **(Japan) Naoki Yamamoto**	**Honda Civic Type R-GT**	B	**102**	**3:01.16.996**
2	64	Modulo Nakajima Racing	(Japan) Takuya Izawa (Japan) Riki Okusa	Honda Civic Type R-GT	D	102	+25.944
3	16	ARTA	(Japan) Hiroki Otsu (Japan) Ren Sato	Honda Civic Type R-GT	B	102	+30.652
4	38	TGR Team KeePer Cerumo	(Japan) Hiroaki Ishiura (Japan) Toshiki Oyu	Toyota GR Supra GT500	B	102	+54.989
5	19	TGR Team WedsSport Bandoh	(Japan) Yuji Kunimoto (Japan) Sena Sakaguchi (Japan) Kazuto Kotaka	Toyota GR Supra GT500	Y	102	+56.891
6	23	NISMO	(Japan) Katsumasa Chiyo (Japan) Mitsunori Takaboshi	Nissan Z NISMO GT500	B	102	+57.522
7	3	NISMO NDDP	(Japan) Atsushi Miyake (Japan) Daiki Sasaki	Nissan Z NISMO GT500	B	102	+58.724
8	17	Astemo Real Racing	(Japan) Syun Koide (Japan) Koudai Tsukakoshi	Honda Civic Type R-GT	B	102	+59.586
9	14	TGR Team ENEOS ROOKIE	(Japan) Kazuya Oshima (Japan) Nirei Fukuzumi	Toyota GR Supra GT500	B	102	+1:00.945
10	8	ARTA	(Japan) Nobuharu Matsushita (Japan) Tomoki Nojiri	Honda Civic Type R-GT	B	102	+1:03.351
11	12	Team Impul	(Belgium) Bertrand Baguette (Japan) Kazuki Hiramine	Nissan Z NISMO GT500	B	102	+1:04.513
12	39	TGR Team SARD	(Japan) Yuhi Sekiguchi (Argentina) Sacha Fenestraz	Toyota GR Supra GT500	B	102	+1:18.756
13	1	TGR Team au TOM'S	(Japan) Sho Tsuboi (Japan) Kenta Yamashita	Toyota GR Supra GT500	B	76	+26 Laps
Ret	37	TGR Team Deloitte TOM'S	(France) Giuliano Alesi (Japan) Ukyo Sasahara	Toyota GR Supra GT500	B	70	+32 Laps
Ret	24	Kondo Racing	(Japan) Tsugio Matsuda (Japan) Teppei Natori	Nissan Z NISMO GT500	Y	11	Accident
GT300
1	**666**	**Seven x Seven Racing**	**(Japan) Kiyoto Fujinami** **(United Kingdom) Harry King** **(Japan) Tsubasa Kondo**	**Porsche 911 GT3 R (992)**	Y	**95**	**3:02.01.705**
2	7	CarGuy MKS Racing	(Japan) Rikuto Kobayashi (United Kingdom) Zak O'Sullivan (Japan) Keita Sawa	Ferrari 296 GT3	Y	95	+32.148
3	0	JLOC	(Japan) Takashi Kogure (Japan) Yuya Motojima	Lamborghini Huracán GT3 Evo 2	Y	95	+41.692
4	56	Kondo Racing	(Japan) Kohei Hirate (Brazil) João Paulo de Oliveira	Nissan GT-R Nismo GT3	Y	95	+56.551
5	6	Velorex	(Japan) Yoshiaki Katayama (Spain) Roberto Merhi Muntan	Ferrari 296 GT3	Y	95	+58.093
6	65	K2 R&D LEON Racing	(Japan) Haruki Kurosawa (Japan) Naoya Gamou (Japan) Togo Suganami	Mercedes-AMG GT3 Evo	B	94	+1 Lap
7	52	Saitama Green Brave	(Japan) Hiroki Yoshida (Japan) Seita Nonaka	Toyota GR Supra GT300	B	94	+1 Lap
8	18	Team UpGarage	(Japan) Takashi Kobayashi (Japan) Yuto Nomura	Mercedes-AMG GT3 Evo	Y	94	+1 Lap
9	87	JLOC	(Japan) Kosuke Matsuura (Japan) Natsu Sakaguchi	Lamborghini Huracán GT3 Evo 2	Y	94	+1 Lap
10	4	Goodsmile Racing & TeamUkyo	(Japan) Nobuteru Taniguchi (Japan) Tatsuya Kataoka	Mercedes-AMG GT3 Evo	Y	94	+1 Lap
11	26	Anest Iwata Racing	(Brazil) Igor Omura Fraga (Japan) Hironobu Yasuda	Lexus RC F GT3	Y	94	+1 Lap
12	2	Hyper Water Racing Inging	(Japan) Yuui Tsutsumi (Japan) Hibiki Taira	Toyota GR86 GT300	B	94	+1 Lap
13	62	HELM Motorsports	(Japan) Yuya Hiraki (Japan) Reiji Hiraki	Nissan GT-R Nismo GT3	Y	94	+1 Lap
14	5	Team Mach	(Japan) Yusuke Shiotsu (Japan) Iori Kimura	Toyota 86 MC GT300	Y	94	+1 Lap
15	25	Hoppy Team Tsuchiya	(Japan) Takamitsu Matsui (Japan) Kimiya Sato	Toyota GR Supra GT500	Y	94	+1 Lap
16	45	Ponos Racing	(Japan) Kei Cozzolino (Japan) Takuro Shinohara	Ferrari 296 GT3	D	94	+1 Lap
17	96	K-tunes Racing	(Japan) Morio Nitta (Japan) Shinichi Takagi	Lexus RC F GT3	D	94	+1 Lap
18	48	Nilzz Racing	(Japan) Daiki Fujiwara (Japan) Taiyo Ida (Japan) Yusaku Shibata	Nissan GT-R Nismo GT3	Y	93	+2 Laps
19	22	R'Qs Motor Sports	(Japan) Masaki Jyonai (Japan) Masaki Kano (Japan) Hisashi Wada	Mercedes-AMG GT3 Evo	Y	93	+2 Laps
20	60	LM corsa	(Japan) Reimei Ito (Japan) Shunsuke Kohno (Japan) Hiroki Yoshimoto	Lexus LC 500 GT	D	93	+2 Laps
21	777	D'station Racing	(Japan) Tomonobu Fujii (United Kingdom) Charlie Fagg	Aston Martin Vantage AMR GT3 Evo	D	93	+2 Laps
22	30	apr	(Japan) Hiroaki Nagai (Japan) Ryo Ogawa (Japan) Manabu Orido	Toyota GR86 GT300	MI	93	+2 Laps
23	9	Pacific Racing Team	(Japan) Yuta Fujiwara (Japan) Ryohei Sakaguchi (Japan) Yusuke Tomibayashi	Mercedes-AMG GT3 Evo	Y	92	+3 Laps
24	61	R&D Sport	(Japan) Takuto Iguchi (Japan) Hideki Yamauchi	Subaru BRZ GT300 (ZD8)	D	83	+11 Laps
Ret	360	Tomei Sports	(Japan) Takayuki Aoki (Japan) Hironobu Shimizu (Japan) Atsushi Tanaka	Nissan GT-R Nismo GT3	Y	53	Puncture
DSQ	31	apr	(Japan) Miki Koyama (Japan) Yuki Nemoto (Denmark) Oliver Rasmussen	Lexus LC 500h GT	B	94	Disqualified
DNS	11	GAINER	(Japan) Ryuichiro Tomita (Japan) Kazuki Oki	Nissan Fairlady Z GT300 (RZ34)	D	0	Did not start

Super GT Series
Previous race: 2025 Sugo GT 300km	2025 season	Next race: 2025 Motegi GT 300km
