= 2025 Motegi GT 300km =

The layout of Twin Ring Motegi, where the race was held

The 2025 Motegi GT 300km was the eighth and final round of the 2025 Super GT Series. It was held at the Twin Ring Motegi in Motegi, Tochigi Prefecture, Japan on November 2, 2025.

The GT500 category was won by Sho Tsuboi and Kenta Yamashita in the #1 TGR Team au TOM'S Toyota GR Supra GT500, whilst Iori Kimura and Yusuke Shiotsu won the GT300 category in the #5 Team Mach Toyota 86 MC GT300.

== Race ==
=== Race results ===
Class winners denoted in bold.

Pos	No	Entrant	Drivers	Chassis	Tyre	Laps	Time/Retired
GT500
1	**1**	**TGR Team au TOM'S**	**(Japan) Sho Tsuboi** **(Japan) Kenta Yamashita**	**Toyota GR Supra GT500**	B	**63**	**1:51:05.545**
2	23	NISMO	(Japan) Katsumasa Chiyo (Japan) Mitsunori Takaboshi	Nissan Z NISMO GT500	B	63	+1.269
3	100	Stanley Team Kunimitsu	(Japan) Tadasuke Makino (Japan) Naoki Yamamoto	Honda Civic Type R-GT	B	63	+26.945
4	39	TGR Team SARD	(Japan) Yuhi Sekiguchi (Argentina) Sacha Fenestraz	Toyota GR Supra GT500	B	63	+27.367
5	37	TGR Team Deloitte TOM'S	(France) Giuliano Alesi (Japan) Ukyo Sasahara	Toyota GR Supra GT500	B	63	+39.116
6	8	ARTA	(Japan) Nobuharu Matsushita (Japan) Tomoki Nojiri	Honda Civic Type R-GT	B	63	+50.138
7	38	TGR Team KeePer Cerumo	(Japan) Hiroaki Ishiura (Japan) Toshiki Oyu	Toyota GR Supra GT500	B	63	+1:01.521
8	16	ARTA	(Japan) Hiroki Otsu (Japan) Ren Sato	Honda Civic Type R-GT	B	63	+1:01.734
9	3	NISMO NDDP	(Japan) Atsushi Miyake (Japan) Daiki Sasaki	Nissan Z NISMO GT500	B	63	+1:05.968
10	24	Kondo Racing	(Japan) Tsugio Matsuda (Japan) Teppei Natori	Nissan Z NISMO GT500	Y	63	+1:11.220
11	19	TGR Team WedsSport Bandoh	(Japan) Yuji Kunimoto (Japan) Sena Sakaguchi	Toyota GR Supra GT500	Y	63	+1:15.608
12	64	Modulo Nakajima Racing	(Japan) Takuya Izawa (Japan) Riki Okusa	Honda Civic Type R-GT	D	63	+1:19.565
13	17	Astemo Real Racing	(Japan) Syun Koide (Japan) Koudai Tsukakoshi	Honda Civic Type R-GT	B	63	+1:27.339
14	14	TGR Team ENEOS ROOKIE	(Japan) Kazuya Oshima (Japan) Nirei Fukuzumi	Toyota GR Supra GT500	B	63	+1:58.537
DSQ	12	Team Impul	(Belgium) Bertrand Baguette (Japan) Kazuki Hiramine	Nissan Z NISMO GT500	B	63	Disqualified
GT300
1	**5**	**Team Mach**	**(Japan) Yusuke Shiotsu** **(Japan) Iori Kimura**	**Toyota 86 MC GT300**	Y	**59**	**1:52:23.835**
2	61	R&D Sport	(Japan) Takuto Iguchi (Japan) Hideki Yamauchi	Subaru BRZ GT300 (ZD8)	D	59	+9.217
3	666	Seven x Seven Racing	(United Kingdom) Harry King (Japan) Tsubasa Kondo	Porsche 911 GT3 R (992)	Y	59	+9.710
4	56	Kondo Racing	(Japan) Kohei Hirate (Brazil) João Paulo de Oliveira	Nissan GT-R Nismo GT3	Y	59	+9.978
5	52	Saitama Green Brave	(Japan) Hiroki Yoshida (Japan) Seita Nonaka	Toyota GR Supra GT300	B	59	+12.075
6	65	K2 R&D LEON Racing	(Japan) Naoya Gamou (Japan) Togo Suganami	Mercedes-AMG GT3 Evo	B	59	+26.066
7	7	CarGuy MKS Racing	(Japan) Rikuto Kobayashi (United Kingdom) Zak O'Sullivan	Ferrari 296 GT3	Y	59	+33.303
8	4	Goodsmile Racing & TeamUkyo	(Japan) Nobuteru Taniguchi (Japan) Tatsuya Kataoka	Mercedes-AMG GT3 Evo	Y	58	+1 Lap
9	2	Hyper Water Racing Inging	(Japan) Yuui Tsutsumi (Japan) Hibiki Taira	Toyota GR86 GT300	B	58	+1 Lap
10	18	Team UpGarage	(Japan) Takashi Kobayashi (Japan) Yuto Nomura	Mercedes-AMG GT3 Evo	Y	58	+1 Lap
11	87	JLOC	(Japan) Kosuke Matsuura (Japan) Natsu Sakaguchi	Lamborghini Huracán GT3 Evo 2	Y	58	+1 Lap
12	777	D'station Racing	(Japan) Tomonobu Fujii (United Kingdom) Charlie Fagg	Aston Martin Vantage AMR GT3 Evo	D	58	+1 Lap
13	96	K-tunes Racing	(Japan) Morio Nitta (Japan) Shinichi Takagi	Lexus RC F GT3	D	58	+1 Lap
14	0	JLOC	(Japan) Takashi Kogure (Japan) Yuya Motojima	Lamborghini Huracán GT3 Evo 2	Y	58	+1 Lap
15	62	HELM Motorsports	(Japan) Yuya Hiraki (Japan) Reiji Hiraki	Nissan GT-R Nismo GT3	Y	58	+1 Lap
16	60	LM corsa	(Japan) Shunsuke Kohno (Japan) Hiroki Yoshimoto	Lexus LC 500 GT	D	58	+1 Lap
17	9	Pacific Racing Team	(Japan) Ryohei Sakaguchi (Japan) Yusuke Tomibayashi	Mercedes-AMG GT3 Evo	Y	58	+1 Lap
18	31	apr	(Japan) Miki Koyama (Japan) Yuki Nemoto	Lexus LC 500h GT	B	58	+1 Lap
19	360	Tomei Sports	(Japan) Rin Arakawa (Japan) Hironobu Shimizu	Nissan GT-R Nismo GT3	Y	58	+1 Lap
20	26	Anest Iwata Racing	(Brazil) Igor Omura Fraga (Japan) Hironobu Yasuda	Lexus RC F GT3	Y	58	+1 Lap
21	45	Ponos Racing	(Japan) Kei Cozzolino (Japan) Takuro Shinohara	Ferrari 296 GT3	D	58	+1 Lap
22	48	Nilzz Racing	(Japan) Taiyo Ida (Japan) Yusaku Shibata	Nissan GT-R Nismo GT3	Y	57	+2 Laps
23	30	apr	(Japan) Hiroaki Nagai (Japan) Manabu Orido	Toyota GR86 GT300	MI	57	+2 Laps
24	11	GAINER	(Japan) Ryuichiro Tomita (Japan) Kazuki Oki	Nissan Fairlady Z GT300 (RZ34)	D	57	+2 Laps
25	20	SHADE Racing	(Japan) Katsuyuki Hiranaka (Japan) Eijiro Shimizu	Toyota GR86 GT300	MI	57	+2 Laps
Ret	22	R'Qs Motor Sports	(Japan) Masaki Kano (Japan) Hisashi Wada	Mercedes-AMG GT3 Evo	Y	27	Mechanical
Ret	6	Velorex	(Japan) Yoshiaki Katayama (Spain) Roberto Merhi Muntan	Ferrari 296 GT3	Y	5	Accident
DNS	25	Hoppy Team Tsuchiya	(Japan) Takamitsu Matsui (Japan) Kimiya Sato	Toyota GR Supra GT500	Y	0	Did not start

Super GT Series
Previous race: 2025 Autopolis GT 3 Hours	2025 season	Next race: None
