= 2025 Sugo GT 300km =

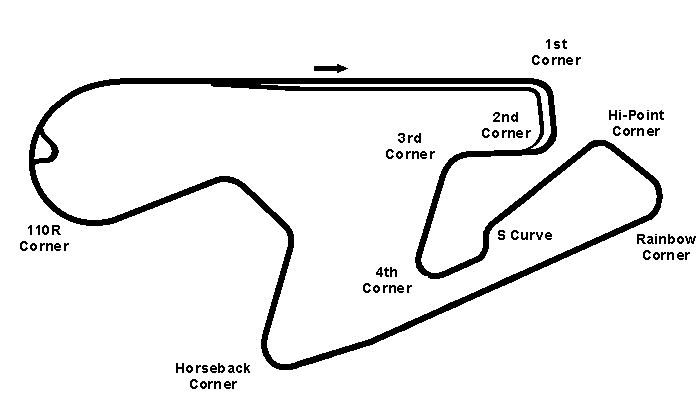
The layout of Sportsland Sugo, where the race was held

The 2025 Sugo GT 300km was the sixth round of the 2025 Super GT Series. It was held at the Sportsland Sugo in Murata, Miyagi Prefecture, Japan on September 21, 2025.

The GT500 category was won by Tsugio Matsuda and Teppei Natori in the #24 Kondo Racing Nissan Z NISMO, whilst Shunsuke Kohno and Hiroki Yoshimoto won the GT300 category in the #60 LM corsa Lexus LC 500 GT.

== Race ==
=== Race results ===
Class winners denoted in bold.

Pos	No	Entrant	Drivers	Chassis	Tyre	Laps	Time/Retired
GT500
1	**24**	**Kondo Racing**	**(Japan) Tsugio Matsuda** **(Japan) Teppei Natori**	**Nissan Z NISMO GT500**	Y	**70**	**2:44.59.658**
2	39	TGR Team SARD	(Japan) Yuhi Sekiguchi (Argentina) Sacha Fenestraz	Toyota GR Supra GT500	B	70	+0.649
3	17	Astemo Real Racing	(Japan) Syun Koide (Japan) Koudai Tsukakoshi	Honda Civic Type R-GT	B	70	+0.886
4	16	ARTA	(Japan) Hiroki Otsu (Japan) Ren Sato	Honda Civic Type R-GT	B	70	+1.012
5	37	TGR Team Deloitte TOM'S	(France) Giuliano Alesi (Japan) Ukyo Sasahara	Toyota GR Supra GT500	B	70	+1.469
6	100	Stanley Team Kunimitsu	(Japan) Tadasuke Makino (Japan) Naoki Yamamoto	Honda Civic Type R-GT	B	70	+2.792
7	14	TGR Team ENEOS ROOKIE	(Japan) Kazuya Oshima (Japan) Nirei Fukuzumi	Toyota GR Supra GT500	B	70	+3.652
8	8	ARTA	(Japan) Nobuharu Matsushita (Japan) Tomoki Nojiri	Honda Civic Type R-GT	B	70	+6.148
9	1	TGR Team au TOM'S	(Japan) Sho Tsuboi (Japan) Kenta Yamashita	Toyota GR Supra GT500	B	70	+6.420
10	19	TGR Team WedsSport Bandoh	(Japan) Yuji Kunimoto (Japan) Sena Sakaguchi	Toyota GR Supra GT500	Y	70	+7.764
11	38	TGR Team KeePer Cerumo	(Japan) Hiroaki Ishiura (Japan) Toshiki Oyu	Toyota GR Supra GT500	B	70	+13.538
12	3	NISMO NDDP	(Japan) Atsushi Miyake (Japan) Daiki Sasaki	Nissan Z NISMO GT500	B	70	+27.464
13	23	NISMO	(Japan) Katsumasa Chiyo (Japan) Mitsunori Takaboshi	Nissan Z NISMO GT500	B	70	+43.215
14	12	Team Impul	(Belgium) Bertrand Baguette (Japan) Kazuki Hiramine	Nissan Z NISMO GT500	B	69	+1 Lap
Ret	64	Modulo Nakajima Racing	(Japan) Takuya Izawa (Japan) Riki Okusa	Honda Civic Type R-GT	D	47	Accident
GT300
1	**60**	**LM corsa**	**(Japan) Shunsuke Kohno** **(Japan) Hiroki Yoshimoto**	**Lexus LC 500 GT**	D	**67**	**2:46.10.998**
2	56	Kondo Racing	(Japan) Kohei Hirate (Brazil) João Paulo de Oliveira	Nissan GT-R Nismo GT3	Y	67	+0.660
3	666	Seven x Seven Racing	(United Kingdom) Harry King (Japan) Tsubasa Kondo	Porsche 911 GT3 R (992)	Y	66	+1 Lap
4	4	Goodsmile Racing & TeamUkyo	(Japan) Nobuteru Taniguchi (Japan) Tatsuya Kataoka	Mercedes-AMG GT3 Evo	Y	66	+1 Lap
5	11	GAINER	(Japan) Ryuichiro Tomita (Japan) Kazuki Oki	Nissan Fairlady Z GT300 (RZ34)	D	66	+1 Lap
6	52	Saitama Green Brave	(Japan) Hiroki Yoshida (Japan) Seita Nonaka	Toyota GR Supra GT300	B	66	+1 Lap
7	18	Team UpGarage	(Japan) Takashi Kobayashi (Japan) Yuto Nomura	Mercedes-AMG GT3 Evo	Y	66	+1 Lap
8	7	CarGuy MKS Racing	(Japan) Rikuto Kobayashi (United Kingdom) Zak O'Sullivan	Ferrari 296 GT3	Y	66	+1 Lap
9	5	Team Mach	(Japan) Yusuke Shiotsu (Japan) Iori Kimura	Toyota 86 MC GT300	Y	66	+1 Lap
10	62	HELM Motorsports	(Japan) Yuya Hiraki (Japan) Reiji Hiraki	Nissan GT-R Nismo GT3	Y	65	+2 Laps
11	65	K2 R&D LEON Racing	(Japan) Naoya Gamou (Japan) Togo Suganami	Mercedes-AMG GT3 Evo	B	65	+2 Laps
12	6	Velorex	(Japan) Yoshiaki Katayama (Spain) Roberto Merhi Muntan	Ferrari 296 GT3	Y	65	+2 Laps
13	30	apr	(Japan) Hiroaki Nagai (Japan) Manabu Orido	Toyota GR86 GT300	MI	65	+2 Laps
14	360	Tomei Sports	(Japan) Rin Arakawa (Japan) Takayuki Aoki	Nissan GT-R Nismo GT3	Y	65	+2 Laps
15	0	JLOC	(Japan) Takashi Kogure (Japan) Yuya Motojima	Lamborghini Huracán GT3 Evo 2	Y	65	+2 Laps
16	9	Pacific Racing Team	(Japan) Ryohei Sakaguchi (Japan) Yusuke Tomibayashi	Mercedes-AMG GT3 Evo	Y	65	+2 Laps
17	22	R'Qs Motor Sports	(Japan) Masaki Kano (Japan) Hisashi Wada	Mercedes-AMG GT3 Evo	Y	65	+2 Laps
18	87	JLOC	(Japan) Kosuke Matsuura (Japan) Natsu Sakaguchi	Lamborghini Huracán GT3 Evo 2	Y	64	+3 Laps
19	48	Nilzz Racing	(Japan) Taiyo Ida (Japan) Yusaku Shibata	Nissan GT-R Nismo GT3	Y	64	+3 Laps
20	25	Hoppy Team Tsuchiya	(Japan) Takamitsu Matsui (Japan) Kimiya Sato	Toyota GR Supra GT500	Y	64	+3 Laps
21	45	Ponos Racing	(Japan) Kei Cozzolino (Japan) Takuro Shinohara	Ferrari 296 GT3	D	64	+3 Laps
22	61	R&D Sport	(Japan) Takuto Iguchi (Japan) Hideki Yamauchi	Subaru BRZ GT300 (ZD8)	D	57	+10 Laps
23	31	apr	(Japan) Miki Koyama (Japan) Yuki Nemoto	Lexus LC 500h GT	B	51	+16 Laps
Ret	777	D'station Racing	(Japan) Tomonobu Fujii (United Kingdom) Charlie Fagg	Aston Martin Vantage AMR GT3 Evo	D	44	Accident
Ret	20	SHADE Racing	(Japan) Katsuyuki Hiranaka (Japan) Eijiro Shimizu	Toyota GR86 GT300	MI	43	Accident
Ret	26	Anest Iwata Racing	(Brazil) Igor Omura Fraga (Japan) Hironobu Yasuda	Lexus RC F GT3	Y	39	Did not finish
Ret	2	Hyper Water Racing Inging	(Japan) Yuui Tsutsumi (Japan) Hibiki Taira	Toyota GR86 GT300	B	15	Did not finish
Ret	96	K-tunes Racing	(Japan) Morio Nitta (Japan) Shinichi Takagi	Lexus RC F GT3	D	10	Did not finish

Super GT Series
Previous race: 2025 Suzuka GT 300km	2025 season	Next race: 2025 Autopolis GT 3 Hours
