= 2025 Suzuka GT 300km =

Layout of Suzuka Circuit, where the race was held

The 2025 Suzuka GT 300km was the fifth round of the 2025 Super GT Series. It was held at the Suzuka Circuit in Suzuka City, Mie Prefecture, Japan on August 24, 2025.

The GT500 category was won by Katsumasa Chiyo and Mitsunori Takaboshi in the #23 NISMO Nissan Z NISMO, whilst Rikuto Kobayashi and Zak O'Sullivan won the GT300 category in the #7 CarGuy MKS Racing Ferrari 296 GT3.

== Race ==
=== Race results ===
Class winners denoted in bold.

Pos	No	Entrant	Drivers	Chassis	Tyre	Laps	Time/Retired
GT500
1	**23**	**NISMO**	**(Japan) Katsumasa Chiyo** **(Japan) Mitsunori Takaboshi**	**Nissan Z NISMO GT500**	B	**52**	**1:47.10.46**
2	14	TGR Team ENEOS ROOKIE	(Japan) Kazuya Oshima (Japan) Nirei Fukuzumi	Toyota GR Supra GT500	B	52	+5.768
3	3	NISMO NDDP	(Japan) Atsushi Miyake (Japan) Daiki Sasaki	Nissan Z NISMO GT500	B	52	+16.569
4	16	ARTA	(Japan) Hiroki Otsu (Japan) Ren Sato	Honda Civic Type R-GT	B	52	+17.844
5	38	TGR Team KeePer Cerumo	(Japan) Hiroaki Ishiura (Japan) Toshiki Oyu	Toyota GR Supra GT500	B	52	+21.454
6	39	TGR Team SARD	(Japan) Yuhi Sekiguchi (Argentina) Sacha Fenestraz	Toyota GR Supra GT500	B	52	+22.540
7	64	Modulo Nakajima Racing	(Japan) Takuya Izawa (Japan) Riki Okusa	Honda Civic Type R-GT	D	52	+23.565
8	12	Team Impul	(Belgium) Bertrand Baguette (Japan) Kazuki Hiramine	Nissan Z NISMO GT500	B	52	+25.197
9	1	TGR Team au TOM'S	(Japan) Sho Tsuboi (Japan) Kenta Yamashita	Toyota GR Supra GT500	B	52	+25.625
10	100	Stanley Team Kunimitsu	(Japan) Tadasuke Makino (Japan) Naoki Yamamoto	Honda Civic Type R-GT	B	52	+33.729
11	8	ARTA	(Japan) Nobuharu Matsushita (Japan) Tomoki Nojiri	Honda Civic Type R-GT	B	52	+1:01.324
12	37	TGR Team Deloitte TOM'S	(France) Giuliano Alesi (Japan) Ukyo Sasahara	Toyota GR Supra GT500	B	52	+1:06.228
13	24	Kondo Racing	(Japan) Tsugio Matsuda (Japan) Teppei Natori	Nissan Z NISMO GT500	Y	52	+1:16.323
14	19	TGR Team WedsSport Bandoh	(Japan) Yuji Kunimoto (Japan) Sena Sakaguchi	Toyota GR Supra GT500	Y	51	+1 Lap
Ret	17	Astemo Real Racing	(Japan) Syun Koide (Japan) Koudai Tsukakoshi	Honda Civic Type R-GT	B	3	Accident
GT300
1	**7**	**CarGuy MKS Racing**	**(Japan) Rikuto Kobayashi** **(United Kingdom) Zak O'Sullivan**	**Ferrari 296 GT3**	Y	**49**	**1:48.25.177**
2	61	R&D Sport	(Japan) Takuto Iguchi (Japan) Hideki Yamauchi	Subaru BRZ GT300 (ZD8)	D	49	+17.452
3	5	Team Mach	(Japan) Yusuke Shiotsu (Japan) Iori Kimura	Toyota 86 MC GT300	Y	49	+23.254
4	45	Ponos Racing	(Japan) Kei Cozzolino (Japan) Takuro Shinohara	Ferrari 296 GT3	D	49	+26.623
5	4	Goodsmile Racing & TeamUkyo	(Japan) Nobuteru Taniguchi (Japan) Tatsuya Kataoka	Mercedes-AMG GT3 Evo	Y	49	+31.916
6	52	Saitama Green Brave	(Japan) Hiroki Yoshida (Japan) Seita Nonaka	Toyota GR Supra GT300	B	49	+39.112
7	0	JLOC	(Japan) Takashi Kogure (Japan) Yuya Motojima	Lamborghini Huracán GT3 Evo 2	Y	49	+41.268
8	56	Kondo Racing	(Japan) Kohei Hirate (Brazil) João Paulo de Oliveira	Nissan GT-R Nismo GT3	Y	49	+41.375
9	666	Seven x Seven Racing	(United Kingdom) Harry King (Japan) Tsubasa Kondo	Porsche 911 GT3 R (992)	Y	49	+1:16.109
10	11	GAINER	(Japan) Ryuichiro Tomita (Japan) Kazuki Oki	Nissan Fairlady Z GT300 (RZ34)	D	48	+1 Lap
11	18	Team UpGarage	(Japan) Takashi Kobayashi (Japan) Yuto Nomura	Mercedes-AMG GT3 Evo	Y	48	+1 Lap
12	2	Hyper Water Racing Inging	(Japan) Yuui Tsutsumi (Japan) Hibiki Taira	Toyota GR86 GT300	B	48	+1 Lap
13	65	K2 R&D LEON Racing	(Japan) Naoya Gamou (Japan) Togo Suganami	Mercedes-AMG GT3 Evo	B	48	+1 Lap
14	96	K-tunes Racing	(Japan) Morio Nitta (Japan) Shinichi Takagi	Lexus RC F GT3	D	48	+1 Lap
15	62	HELM Motorsports	(Japan) Yuya Hiraki (Japan) Reiji Hiraki	Nissan GT-R Nismo GT3	Y	48	+1 Lap
16	87	JLOC	(Japan) Kosuke Matsuura (Japan) Natsu Sakaguchi	Lamborghini Huracán GT3 Evo 2	Y	48	+1 Lap
17	31	apr	(Japan) Miki Koyama (Japan) Yuki Nemoto	Lexus LC 500h GT	B	48	+1 Lap
18	6	Velorex	(Japan) Yoshiaki Katayama (Spain) Roberto Merhi Muntan	Ferrari 296 GT3	Y	48	+1 Lap
19	360	Tomei Sports	(Japan) Rin Arakawa (Japan) Takayuki Aoki	Nissan GT-R Nismo GT3	Y	48	+1 Lap
20	25	Hoppy Team Tsuchiya	(Japan) Takamitsu Matsui (Japan) Kimiya Sato	Toyota GR Supra GT500	Y	48	+1 Lap
21	9	Pacific Racing Team	(Japan) Ryohei Sakaguchi (Japan) Yusuke Tomibayashi	Mercedes-AMG GT3 Evo	Y	48	+1 Lap
22	48	Nilzz Racing	(Japan) Taiyo Ida (Japan) Yusaku Shibata	Nissan GT-R Nismo GT3	Y	47	+2 Laps
23	22	R'Qs Motor Sports	(Japan) Masaki Kano (Japan) Hisashi Wada	Mercedes-AMG GT3 Evo	Y	47	+2 Laps
24	777	D'station Racing	(Japan) Tomonobu Fujii (United Kingdom) Charlie Fagg	Aston Martin Vantage AMR GT3 Evo	D	46	+3 Laps
Ret	26	Anest Iwata Racing	(Brazil) Igor Omura Fraga (Japan) Hironobu Yasuda	Lexus RC F GT3	Y	31	Did not finish
Ret	30	apr	(Japan) Hiroaki Nagai (Japan) Manabu Orido	Toyota GR86 GT300	MI	1	Did not finish
DNS	20	SHADE Racing	(Japan) Katsuyuki Hiranaka (Japan) Eijiro Shimizu	Toyota GR86 GT300	MI	0	Did not start
DSQ	60	LM corsa	(Japan) Hiroki Yoshimoto (Japan) Shunsuke Kohno	Lexus LC 500 GT	D	–	Disqualified

Super GT Series
Previous race: 2025 Fuji GT Sprint	2025 season	Next race: 2025 Sugo GT 300km
