= 2025 Super GT Series =

Sports car racing season in Japan

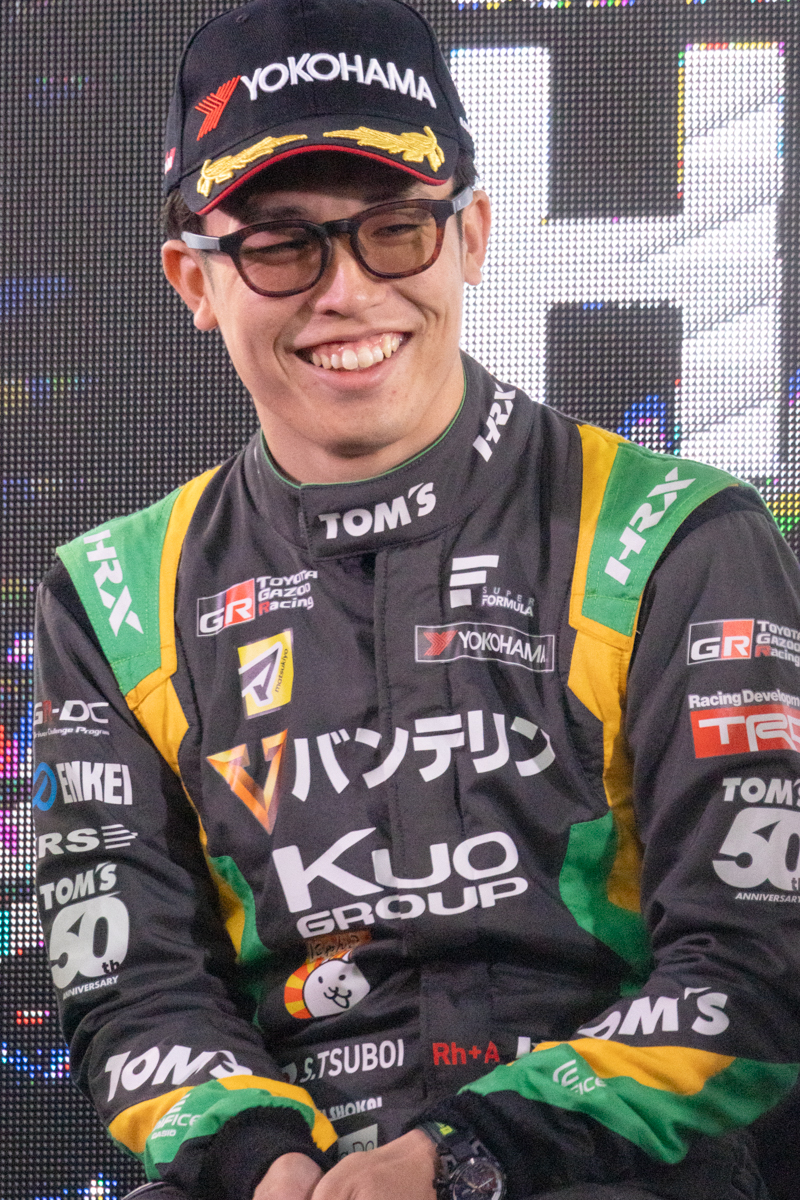
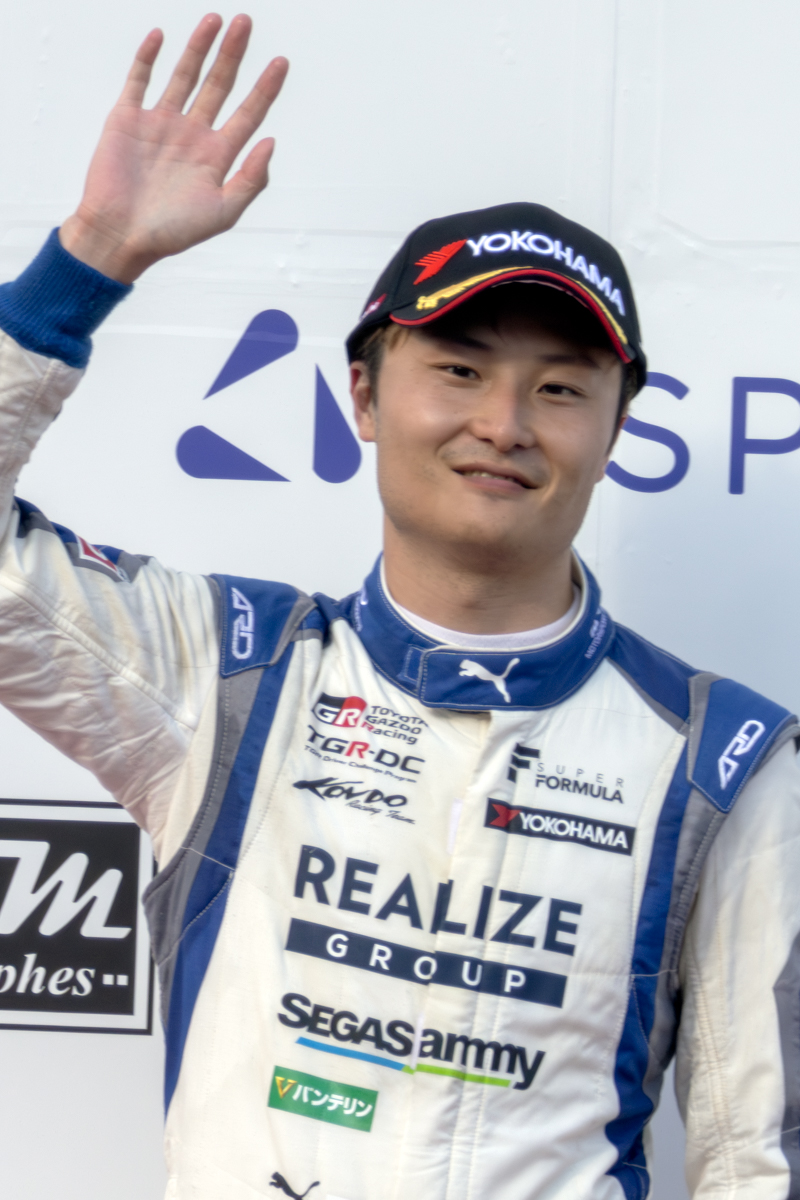
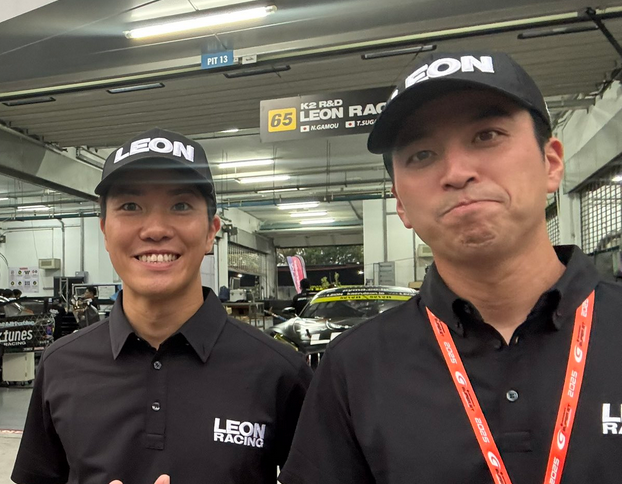
Sho Tsuboi & Kenta Yamashita was the GT500 driver's champion, driving for TGR Team au TOM'S, who were the GT500 teams' champions. Togo Suganami & Naoya Gamou were the GT300 driver's champions, driving for K2 R&D LEON Racing, who were the GT300 teams' champions.
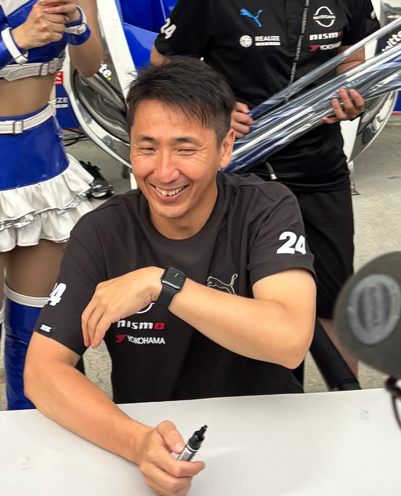
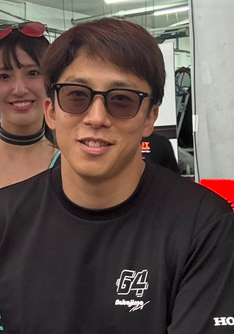
The 2025 Super GT Series was the last season for two-time GT500 champion Tsugio Matsuda and seven-time race winner Takuya Izawa.

The 2025 Autobacs Super GT Series was a motor racing championship based in Japan for grand touring cars. The series was sanctioned by the Japan Automobile Federation (JAF) and ran by the GT Association (GTA). It was the thirty-third season of the Super GT Series, which includes the All Japan Grand Touring Car Championship era, and the twenty-first season under the Super GT name. It was also the forty-third overall season of a JAF national sports car championship dating back to the All Japan Endurance/Sports Prototype Championship.

Sho Tsuboi and Kenta Yamashita of TGR Team au TOM'S entered the season as the defending champions of the GT500 class. Takashi Kogure and Yuya Motojima of JLOC entered the season as the defending champions of the GT300 class.

== Calendar ==
The provisional calendar for 2025 was confirmed on 1 August 2024, which consisted of eight races. Super GT confirmed that Petronas Sepang International Circuit would return to the calendar for the first time since 2013, hosting the third round of the championship on 27–28 June. This would be the first Super GT race held outside of Japan since 2019, when the series last visited Chang International Circuit in Thailand.

On 14 May, Fuji Speedway announced a new three-race sprint format for its August date. The first race, held on 2 August, would be a 160 kilometer (35 lap) multi-class race. The second and third races, held on 3 August, would be single-class, 50-minute sprint races – the first time ever that GT500 and GT300 cars would race separately in a championship round. Only one of the team's two entered drivers could participate on either day.

All other rounds would run the regular 300 kilometer format except for the Golden Week race at Fuji, and the penultimate round at Autopolis, which would continue to run the three-hour, long-distance format introduced in 2024.

Round	Race	Circuit	Location	Dates
1	Okayama GT 300 km Race	(Okayama Prefecture) Okayama International Circuit	Mimasaka, Okayama Prefecture	12–13 April
2	Fuji GT 3 Hours Race GW Special	(Shizuoka Prefecture) Fuji Speedway	Oyama, Shizuoka Prefecture	3–4 May
3	Super GT Malaysia Festival 2025	(Malaysia) Sepang International Circuit	Sepang, Selangor, Malaysia	27–28 June
4	Fuji GT Sprint Race	(Shizuoka Prefecture) Fuji Speedway	Oyama, Shizuoka Prefecture	2–3 August
5	Suzuka GT 300 km Race	(Mie Prefecture) Suzuka Circuit	Suzuka, Mie Prefecture	23–24 August
6	Sugo GT 300 km Race	(Miyagi Prefecture) Sportsland Sugo	Murata, Miyagi Prefecture	20–21 September
7	Autopolis GT 3 Hours Race	(Ōita Prefecture) Autopolis	Hita, Oita Prefecture	18–19 October
8	Motegi GT 300 km Race Grand Final	(Tochigi Prefecture) Mobility Resort Motegi	Motegi, Tochigi Prefecture	1–2 November

== Regulation changes ==
The GTA confirmed several regulation changes for the 2025 Super GT season.

- The series reverted to the two-part knockout qualifying format used from 2013 to 2023. The only change from 2023 was the number of cars that would participate in Q2. In GT500, the top 10 cars in Q1 would advance to Q2, instead of the top eight. In GT300, where the field is split into two groups for Q1, the top nine cars in each group advance to Q2, meaning that 18 cars would participate in Q2 (instead of 16). (Note: Because of the reduced grid size at Sepang, only the top six cars in each Q1 group would advance, and thus, only 12 cars would participate in Q2.)
  - The Fuji GT Sprint Race qualifying format consisted of a single 20-minute GT300 session and a 10-minute GT500 session, held each morning before the races on Saturday and Sunday.
- The GT300 championship points system was changed, awarding 25 points to the first place team and drivers, 20 for second, 16 for third, then 13, 11, 10, 9, 8, 7, 6, 5, 4, 3, 2, and 1 for the top 15 cars. In addition, only the seven highest-scoring rounds counted towards the drivers' and teams' championships at the end of the season. This was to accommodate only 18 full-time GT300 teams being eligible to enter the Sepang round due to limited garage space.
  - For the Fuji GT Sprint Races, each race would award half points, and the points from both races would be added up at the end of both races. The points would be awarded to both entered drivers regardless of their individual results in each race.
- In both classes, qualifying points reverted to awarding only one point to the pole-winning team and drivers.
- The GT300 success weight formula was changed, including the modification of refueling times as a form of success ballast. The nominal success weight limit was raised back to 100 kilograms (instead of 80 kg), but the maximum amount of physical ballast that could be loaded remained at 50 kg. Cars that attained more than 50 kg of nominal success weight would have to install a GTA-supplied refueling restrictor, the diameter of which would be announced in a pre-race bulletin.
- From the second round onward, GT500 tire manufacturers that have not won a race during the season may bring in one extra set of dry tires per weekend. All teams must bring at least one set of heavy rain tires.
- During the reconnaissance lap, all cars must maintain a minimum speed of 80 kilometers per hour. From the formation lap until the start of the race, all cars must be within five car lengths of the car in front.
- Race control can now impose time penalties during a race for various infractions.

== Teams and drivers ==
=== GT500 ===
Team	Make	Car	Engine	No.	Drivers	Tire	Rounds	Ref.
(Japan) TGR Team au TOM'S	Toyota GR	Toyota GR Supra GT500	Toyota RI4BG 2.0 L Turbo I4	1	(Japan) Sho Tsuboi	B	All	
(Japan) TGR Team au TOM'S	Toyota GR	Toyota GR Supra GT500	Toyota RI4BG 2.0 L Turbo I4	1	(Japan) Kenta Yamashita	B	All	
(Japan) TGR Team Deloitte TOM'S	Toyota GR	Toyota GR Supra GT500	Toyota RI4BG 2.0 L Turbo I4	37	(Japan) Ukyo Sasahara	B	All	
(Japan) TGR Team Deloitte TOM'S	Toyota GR	Toyota GR Supra GT500	Toyota RI4BG 2.0 L Turbo I4	37	(France) Giuliano Alesi	B	All	
(Japan) NISMO NDDP	Nissan	Nissan Z NISMO GT500	Nissan NR4S25 2.0 L Turbo I4	3	(Japan) Daiki Sasaki	B	All	
(Japan) NISMO NDDP	Nissan	Nissan Z NISMO GT500	Nissan NR4S25 2.0 L Turbo I4	3	(Japan) Atsushi Miyake	B	All	
(Japan) NISMO	Nissan	Nissan Z NISMO GT500	Nissan NR4S25 2.0 L Turbo I4	23	(Japan) Katsumasa Chiyo	B	All	
(Japan) NISMO	Nissan	Nissan Z NISMO GT500	Nissan NR4S25 2.0 L Turbo I4	23	(Japan) Mitsunori Takaboshi	B	All	
(Japan) ARTA (Note: The team is operated by Mugen, and their cars are entered as ARTA Mugen Civic Type R-GTs.)	Honda	Honda Civic Type R-GT	Honda HR-420E 2.0 L Turbo I4	8	(Japan) Tomoki Nojiri	B	All	
(Japan) ARTA	Honda	Honda Civic Type R-GT	Honda HR-420E 2.0 L Turbo I4	8	(Japan) Nobuharu Matsushita	B	All	
(Japan) ARTA	Honda	Honda Civic Type R-GT	Honda HR-420E 2.0 L Turbo I4	16	(Japan) Hiroki Otsu	B	All	
(Japan) ARTA	Honda	Honda Civic Type R-GT	Honda HR-420E 2.0 L Turbo I4	16	(Japan) Ren Sato	B	All	
(Japan) Team Impul	Nissan	Nissan Z NISMO GT500	Nissan NR4S25 2.0 L Turbo I4	12	(Japan) Kazuki Hiramine	B	All	
(Japan) Team Impul	Nissan	Nissan Z NISMO GT500	Nissan NR4S25 2.0 L Turbo I4	12	(Belgium) Bertrand Baguette	B	All	
(Japan) TGR Team ENEOS ROOKIE	Toyota GR	Toyota GR Supra GT500	Toyota RI4BG 2.0 L Turbo I4	14	(Japan) Kazuya Oshima	B	All	
(Japan) TGR Team ENEOS ROOKIE	Toyota GR	Toyota GR Supra GT500	Toyota RI4BG 2.0 L Turbo I4	14	(Japan) Nirei Fukuzumi	B	All	
(Japan) Astemo Real Racing	Honda	Honda Civic Type R-GT	Honda HR-420E 2.0 L Turbo I4	17	(Japan) Koudai Tsukakoshi	B	All	
(Japan) Astemo Real Racing	Honda	Honda Civic Type R-GT	Honda HR-420E 2.0 L Turbo I4	17	(Japan) Syun Koide	B	All	
(Japan) TGR Team WedsSport Bandoh	Toyota GR	Toyota GR Supra GT500	Toyota RI4BG 2.0 L Turbo I4	19	(Japan) Yuji Kunimoto	Y	All	
(Japan) TGR Team WedsSport Bandoh	Toyota GR	Toyota GR Supra GT500	Toyota RI4BG 2.0 L Turbo I4	19	(Japan) Sena Sakaguchi	Y	All	
(Japan) TGR Team WedsSport Bandoh	Toyota GR	Toyota GR Supra GT500	Toyota RI4BG 2.0 L Turbo I4	19	(Japan) Kazuto Kotaka	Y	2, 7	
(Japan) Kondo Racing	Nissan	Nissan Z NISMO GT500	Nissan NR4S25 2.0 L Turbo I4	24	(Japan) Tsugio Matsuda	Y	All	
(Japan) Kondo Racing	Nissan	Nissan Z NISMO GT500	Nissan NR4S25 2.0 L Turbo I4	24	(Japan) Teppei Natori	Y	All	
(Japan) TGR Team KeePer Cerumo	Toyota GR	Toyota GR Supra GT500	Toyota RI4BG 2.0 L Turbo I4	38	(Japan) Hiroaki Ishiura	B	All	
(Japan) TGR Team KeePer Cerumo	Toyota GR	Toyota GR Supra GT500	Toyota RI4BG 2.0 L Turbo I4	38	(Japan) Toshiki Oyu	B	All	
(Japan) TGR Team SARD	Toyota GR	Toyota GR Supra GT500	Toyota RI4BG 2.0 L Turbo I4	39	(Japan) Yuhi Sekiguchi	B	All	
(Japan) TGR Team SARD	Toyota GR	Toyota GR Supra GT500	Toyota RI4BG 2.0 L Turbo I4	39	(Argentina) Sacha Fenestraz	B	All	
(Japan) Modulo Nakajima Racing	Honda	Honda Civic Type R-GT	Honda HR-420E 2.0 L Turbo I4	64	(Japan) Takuya Izawa	D	All	
(Japan) Modulo Nakajima Racing	Honda	Honda Civic Type R-GT	Honda HR-420E 2.0 L Turbo I4	64	(Japan) Riki Okusa	D	All	
(Japan) Stanley Team Kunimitsu	Honda	Honda Civic Type R-GT	Honda HR-420E 2.0 L Turbo I4	100	(Japan) Naoki Yamamoto	B	All	
(Japan) Stanley Team Kunimitsu	Honda	Honda Civic Type R-GT	Honda HR-420E 2.0 L Turbo I4	100	(Japan) Tadasuke Makino	B	All	

==== Entrant & driver changes ====
Honda announced its driver line-ups on 11 December 2024.

- Astemo Real Racing driver Kakunoshin Ohta left the series to compete part-time in the IMSA SportsCar Championship's GTP class with Acura Meyer Shank Racing. 2024 Super Formula Lights champion Syun Koide, who previously drove for Team UpGarage in the GT300 class, was promoted to GT500 to replace Ohta.
- Honda Racing Corporation took over vehicle maintenance for Stanley Team Kunimitsu, replacing Auto Technic Japan (ATJ).

Toyota announced its driver line-ups on 25 December 2024.

- TGR Team au TOM'S elected to use the GT500 champion's number "1" plate after retaining its two championship-winning drivers from the previous season.
- TGR Team SARD driver Yuichi Nakayama left the team after six seasons to focus on various international programs in Europe, including a GT World Challenge Europe Endurance Cup campaign with Nordique Racing. Former TOM'S driver Sacha Fenestraz returned to the series after a two-year stint in Formula E with Nissan, replacing Nakayama.

Nissan announced its line-ups on 17 January 2025.

- Four-time GT500 champion Ronnie Quintarelli retired from the Super GT Series after the 2024 season, becoming a NISMO ambassador and an advisor to the GT500 program.
- Mitsunori Takaboshi was promoted to the flagship NISMO team from NISMO NDDP to replace Quintarelli, reuniting him with Katsumasa Chiyo
- Daiki Sasaki returned to GT500 after spending a year in GT300 with Kondo Racing, replacing Takaboshi at NISMO NDDP.
- Tokyo Radiator will take over primary sponsorship of Team Impul from Marelli, which though its predecessor Calsonic, had been the team's primary sponsor since 1982.

==== Mid-season changes ====
- Toyota Gazoo Racing GT500 reserve driver Kazuto Kotaka joined TGR Team WedsSport Bandoh as the team's third driver for the long-distance rounds at Fuji and Autopolis.

=== GT300 ===
Team	Make	Car	Engine	No.	Drivers	Tire	Rounds	Ref.
(Japan) JLOC	Lamborghini	Lamborghini Huracán GT3 Evo 2	Lamborghini DGF 5.2 L V10	0	(Japan) Takashi Kogure	Y	All	
(Japan) JLOC	Lamborghini	Lamborghini Huracán GT3 Evo 2	Lamborghini DGF 5.2 L V10	0	(Japan) Yuya Motojima	Y	All	
(Japan) JLOC	Lamborghini	Lamborghini Huracán GT3 Evo 2	Lamborghini DGF 5.2 L V10	87	(Japan) Kosuke Matsuura	Y	All	
(Japan) JLOC	Lamborghini	Lamborghini Huracán GT3 Evo 2	Lamborghini DGF 5.2 L V10	87	(Japan) Natsu Sakaguchi	Y	All	
(Japan) Hyper Water Racing Inging	Toyota GR	Toyota GR86 GT300	Toyota 2UR-GSE 5.4 L V8	2	(Japan) Yuui Tsutsumi	B	All	
(Japan) Hyper Water Racing Inging	Toyota GR	Toyota GR86 GT300	Toyota 2UR-GSE 5.4 L V8	2	(Japan) Hibiki Taira	B	All	
(Japan) Hyper Water Racing Inging	Toyota GR	Toyota GR86 GT300	Toyota 2UR-GSE 5.4 L V8	2	(Japan) Kazuhisa Urabe	B	2, 7	
(Japan) Goodsmile Racing & TeamUKYO	Mercedes-AMG	Mercedes-AMG GT3 Evo	Mercedes-AMG M159 6.2 L V8	4	(Japan) Nobuteru Taniguchi	Y	1–2, 4–8	
(Japan) Goodsmile Racing & TeamUKYO	Mercedes-AMG	Mercedes-AMG GT3 Evo	Mercedes-AMG M159 6.2 L V8	4	(Japan) Tatsuya Kataoka	Y	1–2, 4–8	
(Japan) Goodsmile Racing & TeamUKYO	Mercedes-AMG	Mercedes-AMG GT3 Evo	Mercedes-AMG M159 6.2 L V8	4	(Japan) Yuhki Nakayama	Y	3	
(Japan) Goodsmile Racing & TeamUKYO	Mercedes-AMG	Mercedes-AMG GT3 Evo	Mercedes-AMG M159 6.2 L V8	4	(Japan) Shunji Okumoto	Y	3	
(Japan) Team Mach	Toyota	Toyota 86 MC GT300	GTA V8 4.5 L V8	5	(Japan) Yusuke Shiotsu	Y	1–2, 4–8	
(Japan) Team Mach	Toyota	Toyota 86 MC GT300	GTA V8 4.5 L V8	5	(Japan) Iori Kimura	Y	1–2, 4–8	
(Japan) Velorex	Ferrari	Ferrari 296 GT3	Ferrari F163CE 3.0 L Twin Turbo V6	6	(Japan) Yoshiaki Katayama	Y	All	
(Japan) Velorex	Ferrari	Ferrari 296 GT3	Ferrari F163CE 3.0 L Twin Turbo V6	6	(Spain) Roberto Merhi Muntan	Y	All	
(Japan) CarGuy MKS Racing	Ferrari	Ferrari 296 GT3	Ferrari F163CE 3.0 L Twin Turbo V6	7	(United Kingdom) Zak O'Sullivan	Y	1–2, 4–8	
(Japan) CarGuy MKS Racing	Ferrari	Ferrari 296 GT3	Ferrari F163CE 3.0 L Twin Turbo V6	7	(Japan) Rikuto Kobayashi	Y	1–2, 4–8	
(Japan) CarGuy MKS Racing	Ferrari	Ferrari 296 GT3	Ferrari F163CE 3.0 L Twin Turbo V6	7	(Japan) Keita Sawa	Y	2, 7	
(Japan) Pacific Racing Team	Mercedes-AMG	Mercedes-AMG GT3 Evo	Mercedes-AMG M159 6.2 L V8	9	(Japan) Yusuke Tomibayashi	Y	1–2, 4–8	
(Japan) Pacific Racing Team	Mercedes-AMG	Mercedes-AMG GT3 Evo	Mercedes-AMG M159 6.2 L V8	9	(Japan) Ryohei Sakaguchi	Y	1–2, 4–7	
(Japan) Pacific Racing Team	Mercedes-AMG	Mercedes-AMG GT3 Evo	Mercedes-AMG M159 6.2 L V8	9	(Japan) Yuta Fujiwara	Y	2, 7–8	
(Japan) GAINER	Nissan	Nissan Fairlady Z GT300 (RZ34)	Nissan VR38DETT 3.8 L Twin Turbo V6	11	(Japan) Ryuichiro Tomita	D	1–2, 4–8	
(Japan) GAINER	Nissan	Nissan Fairlady Z GT300 (RZ34)	Nissan VR38DETT 3.8 L Twin Turbo V6	11	(Japan) Kazuki Oki	D	1–2, 4–8	
(Japan) Anest Iwata Racing	Lexus	Lexus RC F GT3	Lexus 2UR-GSE 5.4 L V8	26	(Brazil) Igor Omura Fraga	Y	1–2, 4–8	
(Japan) Anest Iwata Racing	Lexus	Lexus RC F GT3	Lexus 2UR-GSE 5.4 L V8	26	(Japan) Hironobu Yasuda	Y	1–2, 4–8	
(Japan) Team UpGarage	Mercedes-AMG	Mercedes-AMG GT3 Evo	Mercedes-AMG M159 6.2 L V8	18	(Japan) Takashi Kobayashi	Y	All	
(Japan) Team UpGarage	Mercedes-AMG	Mercedes-AMG GT3 Evo	Mercedes-AMG M159 6.2 L V8	18	(Japan) Yuto Nomura	Y	All	
(Japan) SHADE Racing	Toyota GR	Toyota GR86 GT300	Toyota 2UR-GSE 5.4 L V8	20	(Japan) Katsuyuki Hiranaka	M	1–2, 4–6, 8	
(Japan) SHADE Racing	Toyota GR	Toyota GR86 GT300	Toyota 2UR-GSE 5.4 L V8	20	(Japan) Eijiro Shimizu	M	1–2, 4–6, 8	
(Japan) SHADE Racing	Toyota GR	Toyota GR86 GT300	Toyota 2UR-GSE 5.4 L V8	20	(Japan) Yuki Sano	M	2	
(Japan) R'Qs Motor Sports	Mercedes-AMG	Mercedes-AMG GT3 Evo	Mercedes-AMG M159 6.2 L V8	22	(Japan) Masaki Kano	Y	1–2, 4–8	
(Japan) R'Qs Motor Sports	Mercedes-AMG	Mercedes-AMG GT3 Evo	Mercedes-AMG M159 6.2 L V8	22	(Japan) Yuma Shoji	Y	1–2	
(Japan) R'Qs Motor Sports	Mercedes-AMG	Mercedes-AMG GT3 Evo	Mercedes-AMG M159 6.2 L V8	22	(Japan) Masaki Jyonai	Y	2, 4, 7	
(Japan) R'Qs Motor Sports	Mercedes-AMG	Mercedes-AMG GT3 Evo	Mercedes-AMG M159 6.2 L V8	22	(Japan) Hisashi Wada	Y	5–8	
(Japan) Hoppy Team Tsuchiya	Toyota GR	Toyota GR Supra GT300	Toyota 2UR-GSE 5.4 L V8	25	(Japan) Takamitsu Matsui	Y	1–2, 4–8	
(Japan) Hoppy Team Tsuchiya	Toyota GR	Toyota GR Supra GT300	Toyota 2UR-GSE 5.4 L V8	25	(Japan) Kimiya Sato	Y	1–2, 4–8	
(Japan) apr	Toyota GR	Toyota GR86 GT300	Toyota 2UR-GSE 5.4 L V8	30	(Japan) Hiroaki Nagai	M	1–2, 4–8	
(Japan) apr	Toyota GR	Toyota GR86 GT300	Toyota 2UR-GSE 5.4 L V8	30	(Japan) Manabu Orido	M	1–2, 4–8	
(Japan) apr	Toyota GR	Toyota GR86 GT300	Toyota 2UR-GSE 5.4 L V8	30	(Japan) Ryo Ogawa	M	2, 7	
(Japan) apr	Lexus	Lexus LC 500h GT300	Lexus 2UR-GSE 5.4 L Hybrid V8	31	(Japan) Miki Koyama	B	All	
(Japan) apr	Lexus	Lexus LC 500h GT300	Lexus 2UR-GSE 5.4 L Hybrid V8	31	(Japan) Yuki Nemoto	B	1–2, 7	
(Japan) apr	Lexus	Lexus LC 500h GT300	Lexus 2UR-GSE 5.4 L Hybrid V8	31	(Denmark) Oliver Rasmussen	B	2–8	
(Japan) Ponos Racing	Ferrari	Ferrari 296 GT3	Ferrari F163CE 3.0 L Twin Turbo V6	45	(Japan) Kei Cozzolino	D	All	
(Japan) Ponos Racing	Ferrari	Ferrari 296 GT3	Ferrari F163CE 3.0 L Twin Turbo V6	45	(Japan) Takuro Shinohara	D	All	
(Japan) Ponos Racing	Ferrari	Ferrari 296 GT3	Ferrari F163CE 3.0 L Twin Turbo V6	45	(France) Lilou Wadoux	D	1 (Note: Lilou Wadoux was originally entered for the full 2025 season but withdrew on 8 April due to scheduling conflicts and was replaced by Takuro Shinohara.)	
(Japan) Nilzz Racing	Nissan	Nissan GT-R Nismo GT3	Nissan VR38DETT 3.8 L Twin Turbo V6	48	(Japan) Taiyo Ida	Y	1–2, 4–8	
(Japan) Nilzz Racing	Nissan	Nissan GT-R Nismo GT3	Nissan VR38DETT 3.8 L Twin Turbo V6	48	(Japan) Yusaku Shibata	Y	1–2, 4–8	
(Japan) Nilzz Racing	Nissan	Nissan GT-R Nismo GT3	Nissan VR38DETT 3.8 L Twin Turbo V6	48	(Japan) Daiki Fujiwara	Y	2, 7	
(Japan) Saitama Green Brave	Toyota GR	Toyota GR Supra GT300	Toyota 2UR-GSE 5.4 L V8	52	(Japan) Hiroki Yoshida	B	All	
(Japan) Saitama Green Brave	Toyota GR	Toyota GR Supra GT300	Toyota 2UR-GSE 5.4 L V8	52	(Japan) Seita Nonaka	B	All	
(Japan) Kondo Racing	Nissan	Nissan GT-R Nismo GT3	Nissan VR38DETT 3.8 L Twin Turbo V6	56	(Japan) Kohei Hirate	Y	All	
(Japan) Kondo Racing	Nissan	Nissan GT-R Nismo GT3	Nissan VR38DETT 3.8 L Twin Turbo V6	56	(Brazil) João Paulo de Oliveira	Y	1, 4–8	
(Japan) Kondo Racing	Nissan	Nissan GT-R Nismo GT3	Nissan VR38DETT 3.8 L Twin Turbo V6	56	(Japan) Yu Kanamaru	Y	2–3	
(Japan) LM corsa	Lexus	Lexus LC 500 GT300	Lexus 2UR-GSE 5.4 L V8	60	(Japan) Hiroki Yoshimoto	D	All	
(Japan) LM corsa	Lexus	Lexus LC 500 GT300	Lexus 2UR-GSE 5.4 L V8	60	(Japan) Shunsuke Kohno	D	All	
(Japan) LM corsa	Lexus	Lexus LC 500 GT300	Lexus 2UR-GSE 5.4 L V8	60	(Japan) Reimei Ito	D	2, 7	
(Japan) R&D Sport	Subaru	Subaru BRZ GT300 (ZD8)	Subaru EJ20 2.0 L Turbo F4	61	(Japan) Takuto Iguchi	D	All	
(Japan) R&D Sport	Subaru	Subaru BRZ GT300 (ZD8)	Subaru EJ20 2.0 L Turbo F4	61	(Japan) Hideki Yamauchi	D	All	
(Japan) HELM Motorsports	Nissan	Nissan GT-R Nismo GT3	Nissan VR38DETT 3.8 L Twin Turbo V6	62	(Japan) Yuya Hiraki	Y	All	
(Japan) HELM Motorsports	Nissan	Nissan GT-R Nismo GT3	Nissan VR38DETT 3.8 L Twin Turbo V6	62	(Japan) Reiji Hiraki	Y	All	
(Japan) K2 R&D LEON Racing	Mercedes-AMG	Mercedes-AMG GT3 Evo	Mercedes-AMG M159 6.2 L V8	65	(Japan) Naoya Gamou	B	All	
(Japan) K2 R&D LEON Racing	Mercedes-AMG	Mercedes-AMG GT3 Evo	Mercedes-AMG M159 6.2 L V8	65	(Japan) Togo Suganami	B	All	
(Japan) K2 R&D LEON Racing	Mercedes-AMG	Mercedes-AMG GT3 Evo	Mercedes-AMG M159 6.2 L V8	65	(Japan) Haruki Kurosawa	B	2, 7	
(Japan) K-tunes Racing	Lexus	Lexus RC F GT3	Lexus 2UR-GSE 5.4 L V8	96	(Japan) Morio Nitta	D	All	
(Japan) K-tunes Racing	Lexus	Lexus RC F GT3	Lexus 2UR-GSE 5.4 L V8	96	(Japan) Shinichi Takagi	D	All	
(New Zealand) EBM GIGA Racing	Aston Martin	Aston Martin Vantage AMR GT3 Evo	Aston Martin AMR16A 4.0 L Turbo V8	333	(China) Kerong Li	D	3	
(New Zealand) EBM GIGA Racing	Aston Martin	Aston Martin Vantage AMR GT3 Evo	Aston Martin AMR16A 4.0 L Turbo V8	333	(Malaysia) Jazeman Jaafar	D	3	
(New Zealand) EBM GIGA Racing	Porsche	Porsche 911 GT3 R (992)	Porsche M97/80 4.2 L Flat-6	611	(Malaysia) Adrian D'Silva	M	3	
(New Zealand) EBM GIGA Racing	Porsche	Porsche 911 GT3 R (992)	Porsche M97/80 4.2 L Flat-6	611	(France) Dorian Boccolacci	M	3	
(Japan) Tomei Sports	Nissan	Nissan GT-R Nismo GT3	Nissan VR38DETT 3.8 L Twin Turbo V6	360	(Japan) Rin Arakawa	Y	1–6, 8	
(Japan) Tomei Sports	Nissan	Nissan GT-R Nismo GT3	Nissan VR38DETT 3.8 L Twin Turbo V6	360	(Japan) Takayuki Aoki	Y	1–3, 5–7	
(Japan) Tomei Sports	Nissan	Nissan GT-R Nismo GT3	Nissan VR38DETT 3.8 L Twin Turbo V6	360	(Japan) Hironobu Shimizu	Y	2, 4, 7–8	
(Japan) Tomei Sports	Nissan	Nissan GT-R Nismo GT3	Nissan VR38DETT 3.8 L Twin Turbo V6	360	(Japan) Atsushi Tanaka	Y	7	
(Japan) Seven x Seven Racing	Porsche	Porsche 911 GT3 R (992)	Porsche M97/80 4.2 L Flat-6	666	(Japan) Tsubasa Kondo	Y	1–2, 4–7	
(Japan) Seven x Seven Racing	Porsche	Porsche 911 GT3 R (992)	Porsche M97/80 4.2 L Flat-6	666	(Japan) Kiyoto Fujinami	Y	1–2, 7–8	
(Japan) Seven x Seven Racing	Porsche	Porsche 911 GT3 R (992)	Porsche M97/80 4.2 L Flat-6	666	(United Kingdom) Harry King	Y	2, 4–8	
(Japan) D'station Racing	Aston Martin	Aston Martin Vantage AMR GT3 Evo	Aston Martin AMR16A 4.0 L Turbo V8	777	(Japan) Tomonobu Fujii	D	All	
(Japan) D'station Racing	Aston Martin	Aston Martin Vantage AMR GT3 Evo	Aston Martin AMR16A 4.0 L Turbo V8	777	(United Kingdom) Charlie Fagg	D	All	

==== Vehicle changes ====
- Team UpGarage changed cars from the Honda NSX GT3 Evo22 to the Mercedes-AMG GT3 Evo.
- LM corsa changed cars from the Toyota GR Supra GT300 to the Lexus LC500 GT, a non-hybrid version of the No. 31 car used by apr.

==== Entrant changes ====
- During the first official pre-season test at Okayama, JLOC elected to use the GT300 champion's number "0" plate for the championship-winning No. 88 car that was driven by Takashi Kogure and Yuya Motojima.
- After parting ways with Arnage Racing, Anest Iwata established its own team, Anest Iwata Racing. The team will receive vehicle maintenance support from GAINER. 2008 GT300 champion and former Nissan factory driver Hironobu Yasuda returned to the series after a year away, replacing Yuga Furutani, who left the team to focus on his Super Formula Lights campaign with TOM'S.
- apr announced a new lineup for the No. 31 Lexus LC500h GT, with former Jota Sport WEC driver Oliver Rasmussen making his series debut, and Miki Koyama making her full-time GT300 debut after running part-time with Arnage Racing and R'Qs Motor Sports. They replaced Kazuto Kotaka, who became Toyota's full-time GT500 reserve driver, and Jin Nakamura, who moved to the Formula Regional European Championship.
- In the No. 30 apr Toyota GR86, two-time GT300 champion Manabu Orido returned to full-time driving, replacing Rikuto Kobayashi, while Ryo Ogawa returned as the team's third driver for the long-distance events. The No. 30 Toyota GR86 also changed from Yokohama to Michelin tires.
- 2024 FIA F4 Japanese Champion and Honda Formula Dream Project (HFDP) driver Yuto Nomura joined Team UpGarage for his Super GT debut, replacing Syun Koide after his promotion to GT500.
- With new title sponsorship from car wash equipment manufacturer Hyper Water, INGING Motorsport (Hyper Water Racing INGING) announced former Toyota Gazoo Racing Driver Challenge (TGR-DC) F4 driver Kazuhisa Urabe as its third driver, replacing veteran Hiroki Katoh, who focused exclusively on his role as team director.
- TGR-DC driver Yuki Sano joined SHADE Racing as its third driver for the long-distance races. Due to SHADE Racing's withdrawal from Autopolis, Sano would only enter the Golden Week race at Fuji.
- Togo Suganami rejoined K2 R&D LEON Racing for the first time since 2021. To replace Suganami at Hoppy Team Tsuchiya, Kimiya Sato was returned as a full-time driver after spending last season as the team's third driver.
- Porsche returned to GT300 for the first time since 2021 via the new Seven x Seven Racing team, run by Kiyoto Fujinami's KF Motorsport team and backed by luxury hotel company FAV Hotel. The team entered the latest Porsche 911 GT3 R with Yokohama tires. Two-time GT300 champion and team owner Fujinami was announced as one of the team's drivers, joined by four-time Porsche Carrera Cup Japan champion Tsubasa Kondo, who returned to the series for the first time since 2022. 2024 Porsche Supercup runner-up Harry King would join the team as its third driver for the Golden Week race at Fuji.
- Kazuki Oki, who was GAINER's third driver for the final race of the 2025 season, replaced Keishi Ishikawa as a full-time driver of the No. 11 Nissan Fairlady Z GT300.
- Two-time GT500 champion Kohei Hirate left HELM Motorsports and returned to Kondo Racing to drive the No. 56 Nissan GT-R NISMO GT3. GT World Challenge Asia race winner Yu Kanamaru joined Kondo Racing as its third driver.
- HELM Motorsports co-owner Reiji Hiraki returned to full-time driving after serving as the team's third driver behind Hirate, and his brother Yuya Hiraki.
- Tomei Sports promoted former TGR-DC driver Rin Arakawa to a full-time role, replacing Takuya Otaki. The team also signed F4 Japan race winner Hironobu Shimizu as its third driver.
- Ponos Racing changed from Michelin to Dunlop tires and, after receiving technical support and vehicle maintenance from GAINER at the start of 2024, moved into its own facility. Ferrari factory GT driver Lilou Wadoux was set to return to the team for the full season, but before the first round, Wadoux departed the team due to scheduling conflicts with the European Le Mans Series and IMSA SportsCar Championship. 2024 GT300 runner-up Takuro Shinohara, who was set to be Ponos Racing's third driver after his departure from K2 R&D LEON Racing, replaced Wadoux for the full season.
- Reigning Porsche Carrera Cup Japan champion Reimei Ito, who joined LM corsa as the third driver at Suzuka, was announced as the team's third driver for the long-distance races.
- R'Qs Motor Sports signed Super Taikyu ST-3 driver Yuma Shoji as the fourth driver, replacing Miki Koyama.
- Team LeMans changed its entrant name to Velorex.
- BMW M Team Studie left the series to compete in GT World Challenge Asia. Seiji Ara followed Studie to race in GT World Asia alongside Tomohide Yamaguchi. Niklas Krütten moved to International GT Open with Team Motopark, while Bruno Spengler left BMW M Motorsport after 13 years to join Bugatti as their official driver.
- CarGuy Racing returned to the series after a two-year hiatus, partnering with MKS Racing, a new organization created by former MOLA and Yogibo Racing team director Misato Haga. Competing as CarGuy MKS Racing, the team entered the No. 7 Ferrari 296 GT3 with Yokohama tires. Former Williams Driver Academy driver and Formula 2 race winner Zak O'Sullivan made his debut in the series, driving alongside 2024 Super Formula Lights runner-up Rikuto Kobayashi, who was originally slated to be Saitama Green Brave's third driver. 2015–16 Asian Le Mans GT champion Keita Sawa was appointed as the third driver.
- Team Mach signed former Honda factory driver and 2023 Super Formula Lights champion Iori Kimura, who returned to the series after a year in Super Formula with B-Max Racing Team.
- NILZZ Racing signed SRO Japan Cup and Super Taikyu class winner Daiki Fujiwara as its third driver.
- Earl Bamber Motorsport (EBM) announced its Super GT debut as the wildcard entry for the Sepang round, competing as EBM Giga Racing. EBM fielded two entries from two different manufacturers, with two different tire suppliers: The No. 333 Aston Martin Vantage AMR GT3 Evo, driven by Jazeman Jaafar and Kerong Li (with Dunlop tires), and the No. 611 Porsche 911 GT3 R, driven by Porsche Motorsport Asia Pacific driver Dorian Boccolacci and Adrian D'Silva (with Michelin tires).

==== GT300 mid-season changes ====
- Oliver Rasmussen missed the season-opening round at Okayama due to an injury sustained during the first Super Formula round at Suzuka. apr third driver Yuki Nemoto replaced Rasmussen in the No. 31 Lexus LC500h GT. Rasmussen returned for the second round.
- Kondo Racing driver João Paulo de Oliveira missed the Fuji Golden Week race and the Sepang race due to scheduling conflicts with his new full-time drive in the Brazilian Stock Car Pro Series with Full Time Sports. Yu Kanamaru replaced Oliveira for these two rounds.
- SHADE Racing withdrew from the Sepang race after its No. 20 Toyota GR86 GT sustained heavy fire damage during a GT Entrants Association (GTE) test at Suzuka Circuit. The team was also forced to withdraw from the Autopolis 3 Hour race after heavy crash damage sustained during the Sugo round.
- During the offseason, Goodsmile Racing & TeamUKYO announced that 2013 GT300 champion Yuhki Nakayama and reigning Super Taikyu ST-2 champion Shunji Okumoto would drive for the team in Sepang, as both Nobuteru Taniguchi and Tatsuya Kataoka would compete in the 24 Hours of Spa that same weekend.

== Results ==
Drivers credited with winning Pole Position and the race's fastest lap for their respective teams are indicated in bold text.

Round	Circuit	Class	Pole position	Fastest lap	Race winner	Report
1	(Okayama Prefecture) Okayama 300 km	GT500	(Japan) No. 14 TGR Team ENEOS ROOKIE	(Japan) No. 1 TGR Team au TOM'S	(Japan) No. 1 TGR Team au TOM'S	Report
1	(Okayama Prefecture) Okayama 300 km	GT500	(Japan) Kazuya Oshima **(Japan) Nirei Fukuzumi**	(Japan) Sho Tsuboi **(Japan) Kenta Yamashita**	(Japan) Sho Tsuboi (Japan) Kenta Yamashita	Report
1	(Okayama Prefecture) Okayama 300 km	GT300	(Japan) No. 4 Goodsmile Racing & TeamUkyo	(Japan) No. 65 K2 R&D LEON Racing	(Japan) No. 65 K2 R&D LEON Racing	Report
1	(Okayama Prefecture) Okayama 300 km	GT300	(Japan) Nobuteru Taniguchi **(Japan) Tatsuya Kataoka**	(Japan) **Naoya Gamou** (Japan) Togo Suganami	(Japan) Naoya Gamou (Japan) Togo Suganami	Report
2	(Shizuoka Prefecture) Fuji 3 Hours	GT500	(Japan) No. 38 TGR Team KeePer Cerumo	(Japan) No. 38 TGR Team KeePer Cerumo	(Japan) No. 38 TGR Team KeePer Cerumo	Report
2	(Shizuoka Prefecture) Fuji 3 Hours	GT500	(Japan) Hiroaki Ishiura **(Japan) Toshiki Oyu**	(Japan) Hiroaki Ishiura **(Japan) Toshiki Oyu**	(Japan) Hiroaki Ishiura (Japan) Toshiki Oyu	Report
2	(Shizuoka Prefecture) Fuji 3 Hours	GT300	(Japan) No. 777 D'station Racing	(Japan) No. 777 D'station Racing	(Japan) No. 6 Velorex	Report
2	(Shizuoka Prefecture) Fuji 3 Hours	GT300	(Japan) Tomonobu Fujii **(United Kingdom) Charlie Fagg**	**(Japan) Tomonobu Fujii** (United Kingdom) Charlie Fagg	(Japan) Yoshiaki Katayama (Spain) Roberto Merhi Muntan	Report
3	(Malaysia) Sepang 300 km	GT500	(Japan) No. 18 TGR Team WedsSport Bandoh	(Japan) No. 18 TGR Team WedsSport Bandoh	(Japan) No. 37 TGR Team Deloitte TOM'S	Report
3	(Malaysia) Sepang 300 km	GT500	(Japan) Yuji Kunimoto **(Japan) Sena Sakaguchi**	**(Japan) Yuji Kunimoto** (Japan) Sena Sakaguchi	(Japan) Ukyo Sasahara (France) Giuliano Alesi	Report
3	(Malaysia) Sepang 300 km	GT300	(Japan) No. 18 Team UpGarage	(Japan) No. 4 Goodsmile Racing & TeamUkyo	(Japan) No. 18 Team UpGarage	Report
3	(Malaysia) Sepang 300 km	GT300	(Japan) Takashi Kobayashi **(Japan) Yuto Nomura**	(Japan) Yuhki Nakayama **(Japan) Shunji Okumoto**	(Japan) Takashi Kobayashi (Japan) Yuto Nomura	Report
4	(Shizuoka Prefecture) Fuji Sprint I	GT500	(Japan) No. 18 TGR Team WedsSport Bandoh	(Japan) No. 1 TGR Team au TOM'S	(Japan) No. 1 TGR Team au TOM'S	Report
4	(Shizuoka Prefecture) Fuji Sprint I	GT500	**(Japan) Sena Sakaguchi**	**(Japan) Sho Tsuboi**	**(Japan) Sho Tsuboi**	Report
4	(Shizuoka Prefecture) Fuji Sprint I	GT300	(Japan) No. 2 Hyper Water Racing Inging	(Japan) No. 56 Kondo Racing	(Japan) No. 777 D'station Racing	Report
4	(Shizuoka Prefecture) Fuji Sprint I	GT300	**(Japan) Hibiki Taira**	**(Brazil) João Paulo de Oliveira**	(United Kingdom) Charlie Fagg	Report
4	(Shizuoka Prefecture) Fuji Sprint II	GT500	(Japan) No. 14 TGR Team ENEOS ROOKIE	(Japan) No. 14 TGR Team ENEOS ROOKIE	(Japan) No. 14 TGR Team ENEOS ROOKIE	Report
4	(Shizuoka Prefecture) Fuji Sprint II	GT500	**(Japan) Nirei Fukuzumi**	**(Japan) Nirei Fukuzumi**	(Japan) Nirei Fukuzumi	Report
4	(Shizuoka Prefecture) Fuji Sprint II	GT300	(Japan) No. 777 D'station Racing	(Japan) No. 4 Goodsmile Racing & TeamUkyo	(Japan) No. 777 D'station Racing	Report
4	(Shizuoka Prefecture) Fuji Sprint II	GT300	**(Japan) Tomonobu Fujii**	**(Japan) Nobuteru Taniguchi**	(Japan) Tomonobu Fujii	Report
5	(Mie Prefecture) Suzuka 300 km	GT500	(Japan) No. 16 ARTA	(Japan) No. 23 NISMO	(Japan) No. 23 NISMO	Report
5	(Mie Prefecture) Suzuka 300 km	GT500	(Japan) Hiroki Otsu **(Japan) Ren Sato**	(Japan) Katsumasa Chiyo **(Japan) Mitsunori Takaboshi**	(Japan) Katsumasa Chiyo (Japan) Mitsunori Takaboshi	Report
5	(Mie Prefecture) Suzuka 300 km	GT300	(Japan) No. 61 R&D Sport	(Japan) No. 7 CarGuy MKS Racing	(Japan) No. 7 CarGuy MKS Racing	Report
5	(Mie Prefecture) Suzuka 300 km	GT300	(Japan) Takuto Iguchi **(Japan) Hideki Yamauchi**	(United Kingdom) Zak O'Sullivan **(Japan) Rikuto Kobayashi**	(United Kingdom) Zak O'Sullivan (Japan) Rikuto Kobayashi	Report
6	(Miyagi Prefecture) Sugo 300 km	GT500	(Japan) No. 16 ARTA	(Japan) No. 16 ARTA	(Japan) No. 24 Kondo Racing	Report
6	(Miyagi Prefecture) Sugo 300 km	GT500	(Japan) Hiroki Otsu **(Japan) Ren Sato**	**(Japan) Hiroki Otsu** (Japan) Ren Sato	(Japan) Tsugio Matsuda (Japan) Teppei Natori	Report
6	(Miyagi Prefecture) Sugo 300 km	GT300	(Japan) No. 7 CarGuy MKS Racing	(Japan) No. 60 LM corsa	(Japan) No. 60 LM corsa	Report
6	(Miyagi Prefecture) Sugo 300 km	GT300	(United Kingdom) Zak O'Sullivan **(Japan) Rikuto Kobayashi**	(Japan) **Hiroki Yoshimoto** (Japan) Shunsuke Kohno	(Japan) Hiroki Yoshimoto (Japan) Shunsuke Kohno	Report
7	(Ōita Prefecture) Autopolis 3 Hours	GT500	(Japan) No. 3 NISMO NDDP	(Japan) No. 39 TGR Team SARD	(Japan) No. 100 Stanley Team Kunimitsu	Report
7	(Ōita Prefecture) Autopolis 3 Hours	GT500	**(Japan) Daiki Sasaki** (Japan) Atsushi Miyake	(Japan) Yuhi Sekiguchi **(Argentina) Sacha Fenestraz**	(Japan) Naoki Yamamoto (Japan) Tadasuke Makino	Report
7	(Ōita Prefecture) Autopolis 3 Hours	GT300	(Japan) No. 7 CarGuy MKS Racing	(Japan) No. 7 CarGuy MKS Racing	(Japan) No. 666 Seven x Seven Racing	Report
7	(Ōita Prefecture) Autopolis 3 Hours	GT300	(United Kingdom) Zak O'Sullivan **(Japan) Rikuto Kobayashi** (Japan) Keita Sawa	**(United Kingdom) Zak O'Sullivan** (Japan) Rikuto Kobayashi (Japan) Keita Sawa (Note: Tsubasa Kondo, Keita Sawa, Haruki Kurosawa and Kazuhisa Urabe did not participate in qualifying & not run during the race as a third driver and were ineligible for championship points.)	(United Kingdom) Harry King (Japan) Kiyoto Fujinami (Japan) Tsubasa Kondo	Report
8	(Tochigi Prefecture) Motegi 300 km	GT500	(Japan) No. 38 TGR Team KeePer Cerumo	(Japan) No. 23 NISMO	(Japan) No. 1 TGR Team au TOM'S	Report
8	(Tochigi Prefecture) Motegi 300 km	GT500	(Japan) Hiroaki Ishiura **(Japan) Toshiki Oyu**	(Japan) Katsumasa Chiyo **(Japan) Mitsunori Takaboshi**	(Japan) Sho Tsuboi (Japan) Kenta Yamashita	Report
8	(Tochigi Prefecture) Motegi 300 km	GT300	(Japan) No. 61 R&D Sport	(Japan) No. 61 R&D Sport	(Japan) No. 5 Team Mach	Report
8	(Tochigi Prefecture) Motegi 300 km	GT300	(Japan) Takuto Iguchi **(Japan) Hideki Yamauchi**	**(Japan) Takuto Iguchi** (Japan) Hideki Yamauchi	(Japan) Yusuke Shiotsu (Japan) Iori Kimura	Report

== Championship standings ==
=== Drivers' championships ===
Race points
Scoring system

Position	1st	2nd	3rd	4th	5th	6th	7th	8th	9th	10th	11th	12th	13th	14th	15th	Pole
GT500 Points	20	15	11	8	6	5	4	3	2	1	0					1
GT300 Points	25	20	16	13	11	10	9	8	7	6	5	4	3	2	1	1

- For the Fuji GT Sprint Races, each race would award half points, and the points from both races would be added up at the end of both races. The points would be awarded to both entered drivers regardless of their individual results in each race.

==== GT500 ====
Rank	Driver	Team	OKA	FUJ	SEP	SPRINT		SUZ	SUG	AUT	MOT	Points
1	(Japan) Sho Tsuboi	(Japan) No. 1 TGR Team au TOM'S	1	2	7	1^{S}	2	9	9	13†	1	80.5
1	(Japan) Kenta Yamashita	(Japan) No. 1 TGR Team au TOM'S	1	2	7	1	2^{S}	9	9	13†	1	80.5
2	(Japan) Tadasuke Makino	(Japan) No. 100 Stanley Team Kunimitsu	4	3	6	7^{S}	12	10	6	1	3	63
2	(Japan) Naoki Yamamoto	(Japan) No. 100 Stanley Team Kunimitsu	4	3	6	7	12^{S}	10	6	1	3	63
3	(Japan) Toshiki Oyu	(Japan) No. 38 TGR Team KeePer Cerumo	Ret	**1**	8	2^{S}	3	5	11	4	**7**	56
3	(Japan) Hiroaki Ishiura	(Japan) No. 38 TGR Team KeePer Cerumo	Ret	**1**	8	2	3^{S}	5	11	4	**7**	56
4	(Japan) Nirei Fukuzumi	(Japan) No. 14 TGR Team ENEOS ROOKIE	**2**	6	9	Ret	**1**^{S}	2	7	9	14	54.5
4	(Japan) Kazuya Oshima	(Japan) No. 14 TGR Team ENEOS ROOKIE	**2**	6	9	Ret^{S}	**1**	2	7	9	14	54.5
5	(Japan) Yuhi Sekiguchi	(Japan) No. 39 TGR Team SARD	3	5	14	5	4^{S}	6	2	12	4	52
5	(Argentina) Sacha Fenestraz	(Japan) No. 39 TGR Team SARD	3	5	14	5^{S}	4	6	2	12	4	52
6	(Japan) Ukyo Sasahara	(Japan) No. 37 TGR Team Deloitte TOM'S	5	7	1	3^{S}	7	12	5	Ret	5	49.5
6	(France) Giuliano Alesi	(Japan) No. 37 TGR Team Deloitte TOM'S	5	7	1	3	7^{S}	12	5	Ret	5	49.5
7	(Japan) Katsumasa Chiyo	(Japan) No. 23 NISMO	6	8	13	11	9^{S}	1	13	6	2	49
7	(Japan) Mitsunori Takaboshi	(Japan) No. 23 NISMO	6	8	13	11^{S}	9	1	13	6	2	49
8	(Japan) Hiroki Otsu	(Japan) No. 16 ARTA	Ret	11	12	13^{S}	14	**4**	**4**	3	8	32
8	(Japan) Ren Sato	(Japan) No. 16 ARTA	Ret	11	12	13	14^{S}	**4**	**4**	3	8	32
9	(Japan) Tomoki Nojiri	(Japan) No. 8 ARTA	7	9	2	10^{S}	11	11	8	10	6	30.5
9	(Japan) Nobuharu Matsushita	(Japan) No. 8 ARTA	7	9	2	10	11^{S}	11	8	10	6	30.5
10	(Japan) Kazuki Hiramine	(Japan) No. 12 Team Impul	Ret	4	3	6	5^{S}	8	14	11	DSQ	27.5
10	(Belgium) Bertrand Baguette	(Japan) No. 12 Team Impul	Ret	4	3	6^{S}	5	8	14	11	DSQ	27.5
11	(Japan) Syun Koide	(Japan) No. 17 Astemo Real Racing	8	12	4	9^{S}	13	Ret	3	8	13	26
11	(Japan) Koudai Tsukakoshi	(Japan) No. 17 Astemo Real Racing	8	12	4	9	13^{S}	Ret	3	8	13	26
12	(Japan) Atsushi Miyake	(Japan) No. 3 NISMO NDDP	10	10	11	8	6^{S}	3	12	**7**	9	24
12	(Japan) Daiki Sasaki	(Japan) No. 3 NISMO NDDP	10	10	11	8^{S}	6	3	12	**7**	9	24
13	(Japan) Riki Okusa	(Japan) No. 64 Modulo Nakajima Racing	9	13	10	14	8^{S}	7	Ret	2	12	23.5
13	(Japan) Takuya Izawa	(Japan) No. 64 Modulo Nakajima Racing	9	13	10	14^{S}	8	7	Ret	2	12	23.5
14	(Japan) Teppei Natori	(Japan) No. 24 Kondo Racing	11†	15	Ret	12	10^{S}	13	1	Ret	10	21.5
14	(Japan) Tsugio Matsuda	(Japan) No. 24 Kondo Racing	11†	15	Ret	12^{S}	10	13	1	Ret	10	21.5
15	(Japan) Sena Sakaguchi	(Japan) No. 19 TGR Team WedsSport Bandoh	12†	14	**5**	**4**^{S}	15	14	10	5	11	18.5
15	(Japan) Yuji Kunimoto	(Japan) No. 19 TGR Team WedsSport Bandoh	12†	14	**5**	**4**	15^{S}	14	10	5	11	18.5
—	(Japan) Kazuto Kotaka	(Japan) No. 19 TGR Team WedsSport Bandoh		14						5 (Note: Kazuto Kotaka did not participate in qualifying & not run during the race as a third driver and were ineligible for championship points.)		0
Rank	Driver	Team	OKA	FUJ	SEP	SPRINT		SUZ	SUG	AUT	MOT	Points

Colour	Result
Gold	Winner
Silver	Second place
Bronze	Third place
Green	Points classification
Blue	Non-points classification
Blue	Non-classified finish (NC)
Purple	Retired, not classified (Ret)
Red	Did not qualify (DNQ)
Red	Did not pre-qualify (DNPQ)
Black	Disqualified (DSQ)
White	Did not start (DNS)
White	Withdrew (WD)
White	Race cancelled (C)
Blank	Did not practice (DNP)
Blank	Did not arrive (DNA)
Blank	Excluded (EX)

**Bold** – Pole
Italics – Fastest Lap
† — Did not finish but classified
^{S} — Driver who started the sprint race

==== GT300 ====
Rank	Driver	Team	OKA	FUJ	SEP	SPRINT		SUZ	SUG	AUT	MOT	Points
1	(Japan) Naoya Gamou	(Japan) No. 65 K2 R&D LEON Racing	1	5	7	3^{S}	3	13	11	6	6	86
1	(Japan) Togo Suganami	(Japan) No. 65 K2 R&D LEON Racing	1	5	7	3	3^{S}	13	11	6	6	86
2	(Japan) Kohei Hirate	(Japan) No. 56 Kondo Racing	3	7	10	11	10^{S}	8	2	4	4	84
3	(Japan) Rikuto Kobayashi	(Japan) No. 7 CarGuy MKS Racing	17	4		4^{S}	17	1	**8**	**2**	7	83.5
3	(United Kingdom) Zak O'Sullivan	(Japan) No. 7 CarGuy MKS Racing	17	4		4	17^{S}	1	**8**	**2**	7	83.5
4	(Brazil) João Paulo de Oliveira	(Japan) No. 56 Kondo Racing	3			11^{S}	10	8	2	4	4	75.5
5	(Japan) Tatsuya Kataoka	(Japan) No. 4 Goodsmile Racing & TeamUKYO	**4**	9		2^{S}	5	5	4	10	8	74.5
5	(Japan) Nobuteru Taniguchi	(Japan) No. 4 Goodsmile Racing & TeamUKYO	**4**	9		2	5^{S}	5	4	10	8	74.5
6	(United Kingdom) Harry King	(Japan) No. 666 Seven x Seven Racing		24		9	8^{S}	9	3	1	3	71.5
7	(Japan) Hiroki Yoshida	(Japan) No. 52 Saitama Green Brave	Ret	26	2	5^{S}	6	6	6	7	5	70.5
7	(Japan) Seita Nonaka	(Japan) No. 52 Saitama Green Brave	Ret	26	2	5	6^{S}	6	6	7	5	70.5
8	(Japan) Iori Kimura	(Japan) No. 5 Team Mach	16	10		7	4^{S}	3	9	14	1	67
8	(Japan) Yusuke Shiotsu	(Japan) No. 5 Team Mach	16	10		7^{S}	4	3	9	14	1	67
9	(Japan) Hideki Yamauchi	(Japan) No. 61 R&D Sport	13	8	8	8^{S}	Ret	**2**	22†	24†	**2**	65
9	(Japan) Takuto Iguchi	(Japan) No. 61 R&D Sport	13	8	8	8	Ret^{S}	**2**	22†	24†	**2**	65
10	(Japan) Yuui Tsutsumi	(Japan) No. 2 Hyper Water Racing Inging	10	3	5	**6**	2^{S}	12	Ret	12	9	63.5
10	(Japan) Hibiki Taira	(Japan) No. 2 Hyper Water Racing Inging	10	3	5	**6**^{S}	2	12	Ret	12	9	63.5
11	(Japan) Yuto Nomura	(Japan) No. 18 Team UpGarage	21	23	**1**	10	7^{S}	11	7	8	10	61.5
11	(Japan) Takashi Kobayashi	(Japan) No. 18 Team UpGarage	21	23	**1**	10^{S}	7	11	7	8	10	61.5
12	(Japan) Tomonobu Fujii	(Japan) No. 777 D'station Racing	24	**2**	6	1	**1**^{S}	24	Ret	21	12	60.5
12	(United Kingdom) Charlie Fagg	(Japan) No. 777 D'station Racing	24	**2**	6	1^{S}	**1**	24	Ret	21	12	60.5
13	(Japan) Yuya Motojima	(Japan) No. 0 JLOC	9	Ret	4	Ret	11^{S}	7	15	3	14	50.5
13	(Japan) Takashi Kogure	(Japan) No. 0 JLOC	9	Ret	4	Ret^{S}	11	7	15	3	14	50.5
14	(Japan) Kiyoto Fujinami	(Japan) No. 666 Seven x Seven Racing	8	24						1	3	49
15	(Spain) Roberto Merhi Muntan	(Japan) No. 6 Velorex	DSQ	1	13	15^{S}	Ret	18	12	5	Ret	43.5
15	(Japan) Yoshiaki Katayama	(Japan) No. 6 Velorex	DSQ	1	13	15	Ret^{S}	18	12	5	Ret	43.5
16	(Japan) Tsubasa Kondo	(Japan) No. 666 Seven x Seven Racing	8	24		9^{S}	8	9	3	1		38.5
17	(Japan) Kei Cozzolino	(Japan) No. 45 Ponos Racing	12	6	14	13	9^{S}	4	21	16	21	34
17	(Japan) Takuro Shinohara	(Japan) No. 45 Ponos Racing	12	6	14	13^{S}	9	4	21	16	21	34
18	(Brazil) Igor Omura Fraga	(Japan) No. 26 Anest Iwata Racing	2	11		14^{S}	18	Ret	Ret	11	20	31
18	(Japan) Hironobu Yasuda	(Japan) No. 26 Anest Iwata Racing	2	11		14	18^{S}	Ret	Ret	11	20	31
19	(Japan) Hiroki Yoshimoto	(Japan) No. 60 LM corsa	14	15	15	18	16^{S}	DSQ	1	20	16	29
19	(Japan) Shunsuke Kohno	(Japan) No. 60 LM corsa	14	15	15	18^{S}	16	DSQ	1	20	16	29
20	(Japan) Natsu Sakaguchi	(Japan) No. 87 JLOC	7	25	9	21	14^{S}	16	18	9	11	29
20	(Japan) Kosuke Matsuura	(Japan) No. 87 JLOC	7	25	9	21^{S}	14	16	18	9	11	29
21	(Japan) Ryuichiro Tomita	(Japan) No. 11 GAINER	11	14		12^{S}	19	10	5	DNS	24	26
21	(Japan) Kazuki Oki	(Japan) No. 11 GAINER	11	14		12	19^{S}	10	5	DNS	24	26
22	(Japan) Shinichi Takagi	(Japan) No. 96 K-tunes Racing	6	13	16	Ret	15^{S}	14	Ret	17	13	18.5
22	(Japan) Morio Nitta	(Japan) No. 96 K-tunes Racing	6	13	16	Ret^{S}	15	14	Ret	17	13	18.5
23	(Japan) Reiji Hiraki	(Japan) No. 62 HELM Motorsports	19	Ret	11	19	12^{S}	15	10	13	15	18
23	(Japan) Yuya Hiraki	(Japan) No. 62 HELM Motorsports	19	Ret	11	19^{S}	12	15	10	13	15	18
24	(Japan) Yuhki Nakayama (Japan) Shunji Okumoto	(Japan) No. 4 Goodsmile Racing & TeamUKYO			3							16
25	(Japan) Yu Kanamaru	(Japan) No. 56 Kondo Racing		7	10							15
26	(Japan) Yusuke Tomibayashi	(Japan) No. 9 Pacific Racing Team	5	18		22	13^{S}	21	16	23	17	12.5
26	(Japan) Ryohei Sakaguchi	(Japan) No. 9 Pacific Racing Team	5	18		22^{S}	13	21	16	23		12.5
27	(Japan) Rin Arakawa	(Japan) No. 360 Tomei Sports	18	12	18	20^{S}	20	19	14		19	6
27	(Japan) Takayuki Aoki	(Japan) No. 360 Tomei Sports	18	12	18			19	14	Ret		6
28	(Japan) Miki Koyama	(Japan) No. 31 apr	22	19	12	17	Ret^{S}	17	23†	DSQ	18	4
28	(Denmark) Oliver Rasmussen	(Japan) No. 31 apr		19	12	17^{S}	Ret	17	23†	DSQ	18	4
29	(Japan) Hironobu Shimizu	(Japan) No. 360 Tomei Sports		12		20	20^{S}			Ret	19	4
30	(Japan) Manabu Orido	(Japan) No. 30 apr	20	16		24^{S}	24	Ret	13	22	23	3
30	(Japan) Hiroaki Nagai	(Japan) No. 30 apr	20	16		24	24^{S}	Ret	13	22	23	3
31	(Japan) Takamitsu Matsui	(Japan) No. 25 Hoppy Team Tsuchiya	15	22		25	23^{S}	20	20	15	DNS	2
31	(Japan) Kimiya Sato	(Japan) No. 25 Hoppy Team Tsuchiya	15	22		25^{S}	23	20	20	15	DNS	2
32	(Japan) Reimei Ito	(Japan) No. 60 LM corsa		15						20		1
—	(Japan) Keita Sawa	(Japan) No. 7 CarGuy MKS Racing		4 (Note: Kazuhisa Urabe, Keita Sawa, and Haruki Kurosawa did not participate in qualifying & not run during the race as a third driver and were ineligible for championship points.)						**2**		0
—	(Japan) Kazuhisa Urabe	(Japan) No. 2 Hyper Water Racing Inging		3						12		0
—	(Japan) Haruki Kurosawa	(Japan) No. 65 K2 R&D LEON Racing		5						6		0
—	(Japan) Eijiro Shimizu	(Japan) No. 20 SHADE Racing	Ret	17		16^{S}	21	DNS	Ret		25	0
—	(Japan) Katsuyuki Hiranaka	(Japan) No. 20 SHADE Racing	Ret	17		16	21^{S}	DNS	Ret		25	0
—	(Japan) Ryo Ogawa	(Japan) No. 30 apr		16						22		0
—	(Japan) Yuta Fujiwara	(Japan) No. 9 Pacific Racing Team		18						23	17	0
—	(Japan) Masaki Kano	(Japan) No. 22 R’Qs Motor Sports	25	20		23^{S}	25	23	17	19	Ret	0
—	(Japan) Hisashi Wada	(Japan) No. 22 R’Qs Motor Sports						23	17	19	Ret	0
—	(Japan) Yuki Sano	(Japan) No. 20 SHADE Racing		17								0
—	(Japan) Yusaku Shibata	(Japan) No. 48 Nilzz Racing	23	21		26	22^{S}	22	19	18	22	0
—	(Japan) Taiyo Ida	(Japan) No. 48 Nilzz Racing	23	21		26^{S}	22	22	19	18	22	0
—	(Japan) Masaki Jyonai	(Japan) No. 22 R’Qs Motor Sports		20		23	25^{S}			19		0
—	(Japan) Daiki Fujiwara	(Japan) No. 48 Nilzz Racing		21						19		0
—	(Japan) Yuki Nemoto	(Japan) No. 31 apr	22	19						DSQ		0
—	(Japan) Yuma Shoji	(Japan) No. 22 R’Qs Motor Sports	25	20								0
—	(Japan) Atsushi Tanaka	(Japan) No. 360 Tomei Sports								Ret		0
—	(France) Lilou Wadoux	(Japan) No. 45 Ponos Racing	WD									0
Guest drivers ineligible to score points
—	(Malaysia) Adrian D'Silva (France) Dorian Boccolacci	(New Zealand) No. 611 EBM GIGA Racing			17							0
—	(China) Kerong Li (Malaysia) Jazeman Jaafar	(New Zealand) No. 333 EBM GIGA Racing			19							0
Rank	Driver	Team	OKA	FUJ	SEP	SPRINT		SUZ	SUG	AUT	MOT	Points

=== Teams' championships ===
Race points
Scoring system

Position	1st	2nd	3rd	4th	5th	6th	7th	8th	9th	10th	11th	12th	13th	14th	15th	Lead Lap	-1 Lap	-2 Laps	-3 Laps or more
GT500 Points	20	15	11	8	6	5	4	3	2	1	0					3	2	1	
GT300 Points	25	20	16	13	11	10	9	8	7	6	5	4	3	2	1	3		2	1

- For the Fuji Sprint Race, half points to be awarded.

==== GT500 ====
Rank	Team	OKA	FUJ	SEP	SPRINT		SUZ	SUG	AUT	MOT	Points
1	(Japan) No. 1 TGR Team au TOM'S	1^{1}	2^{1}	7^{1}	1^{1}	2^{1}	9^{1}	9^{1}	13^{3}	1^{1}	102.5
2	(Japan) No. 100 Stanley Team Kunimitsu	4^{1}	3^{1}	6^{1}	7^{1}	12^{1}	10^{1}	6^{1}	1^{1}	3^{1}	87
3	(Japan) No. 39 TGR Team SARD	3^{1}	5^{1}	14^{1}	5^{1}	4^{1}	6^{1}	2^{1}	12^{1}	4^{1}	76
4	(Japan) No. 14 TGR Team ENEOS ROOKIE	2^{1}	6^{1}	9^{1}	Ret	1^{1}	2^{1}	7^{1}	9^{1}	14^{1}	75.5
5	(Japan) No. 38 TGR Team KeePer Cerumo	Ret	1^{1}	8^{1}	2^{1}	3^{1}	5^{1}	11^{1}	4^{1}	7^{1}	75
6	(Japan) No. 23 NISMO	6^{1}	8^{1}	13^{1}	11^{1}	9^{1}	1^{1}	13^{1}	6^{1}	2^{1}	73
7	(Japan) No. 37 TGR Team Deloitte TOM'S	5^{1}	7^{1}	1^{1}	3^{1}	7^{1}	12^{1}	5^{1}	Ret	5^{1}	70.5
8	(Japan) No. 8 ARTA	7^{1}	9^{1}	2^{1}	10^{1}	11^{1}	11^{1}	8^{1}	10^{1}	6^{1}	54.5
9	(Japan) No. 16 ARTA	Ret	11^{1}	12^{1}	13^{1}	14^{2}	4^{1}	4^{1}	3^{1}	8^{1}	50.5
10	(Japan) No. 17 Astemo Real Racing	8^{2}	12^{2}	4^{1}	9^{1}	13^{1}	Ret	3^{1}	8^{1}	13^{1}	45
11	(Japan) No. 3 NISMO NDDP	10^{3}	10^{1}	11^{1}	8^{1}	6^{1}	3^{1}	12^{1}	7^{1}	9^{1}	45
12	(Japan) No. 12 Team Impul	Ret	4^{1}	3^{1}	6^{1}	5^{1}	8^{1}	14^{2}	11^{1}	DSQ	44.5
13	(Japan) No. 64 Modulo Nakajima Racing	9^{2}	13^{2}	10^{1}	14^{1}	8^{1}	7^{1}	Ret	2^{1}	12^{1}	42.5
14	(Japan) No. 19 TGR Team WedsSport Bandoh	12^{3}	14^{2}	5^{1}	4^{1}	15^{2}	14^{2}	10^{1}	5^{1}	11^{1}	36.5
15	(Japan) No. 24 Kondo Racing	11^{3}	15^{3}	Ret	12^{1}	10^{1}	13^{1}	1^{1}	Ret	10^{1}	35.5
Rank	Team	OKA	FUJ	SEP	SPRINT		SUZ	SUG	AUT	MOT	Points

==== GT300 ====
Rank	Team	OKA	FUJ	SEP	SPRINT		SUZ	SUG	AUT	MOT	Points
1	(Japan) No. 65 K2 R&D LEON Racing	1^{1}	5^{1}	7^{1}	3^{1}	3^{1}	13^{1}	11^{2}	6^{1}	6^{1}	106
2	(Japan) No. 56 Kondo Racing	3^{1}	7^{1}	10^{1}	11^{1}	10^{1}	8^{1}	2^{1}	4^{1}	4^{1}	106
3	(Japan) No. 4 Goodsmile Racing & TeamUkyo	4^{1}	9^{1}	3^{1}	2^{1}	5^{1}	5^{1}	4^{1}	10^{1}	8^{1}	104.5
4	(Japan) No. 7 CarGuy MKS Racing	17^{2}	4^{1}		4^{1}	17^{1}	1^{1}	8^{1}	2^{1}	7^{1}	101.5
5	(Japan) No. 666 Seven x Seven Racing	8^{1}	24^{3}		9^{1}	8^{1}	9^{1}	3^{1}	1^{1}	3^{1}	98.5
6	(Japan) No. 52 Saitama Green Brave	Ret	26^{3}	2^{1}	5^{1}	6^{1}	6^{1}	6^{1}	7^{1}	5^{1}	89.5
7	(Japan) No. 5 Team Mach	16^{2}	10^{1}		7^{1}	4^{1}	3^{1}	9^{1}	14^{1}	1^{1}	87
8	(Japan) No. 2 Hyper Water Racing Inging	10^{1}	3^{1}	5^{1}	6^{1}	2^{1}	12^{1}	Ret	12^{1}	9^{1}	84
9	(Japan) No. 61 R&D Sport	13^{1}	8^{1}	8^{1}	8^{1}	Ret	2^{1}	22^{3}	24^{3}	2^{1}	81.5
10	(Japan) No. 18 Team UpGarage	21^{3}	23^{3}	1^{1}	10^{1}	7^{1}	11^{1}	10^{1}	8^{1}	10^{1}	80.5
11	(Japan) No. 777 D'station Racing	24^{3}	2^{1}	6^{1}	1^{1}	1^{1}	24^{3}	Ret	21^{2}	12^{1}	75
12	(Japan) No. 0 JLOC	9^{1}	Ret	4^{1}	Ret	11^{1}	7^{1}	15^{2}	3^{1}	11^{1}	72
13	(Japan) No. 6 Velorex	DSQ	1^{1}	13^{1}	15^{1}	Ret	18^{1}	12^{2}	5^{1}	Ret	59
14	(Japan) No. 45 Ponos Racing	12^{1}	6^{1}	14^{1}	13^{1}	9^{1}	4^{1}	21^{3}	16^{1}	21^{1}	56
15	(Japan) No. 87 JLOC	7^{1}	25^{3}	4^{1}	21^{1}	14^{1}	16^{1}	18^{3}	9^{1}	11^{1}	49
16	(Japan) No. 60 LM corsa	14^{2}	15^{2}	15^{1}	18^{1}	16^{1}	DSQ	1^{1}	20^{2}	16^{1}	47
17	(Japan) No. 26 Anest Iwata Racing	2^{1}	11^{1}		14^{1}	18^{1}	Ret	Ret	11^{1}	20^{1}	46
18	(Japan) No. 11 GAINER	11^{1}	14^{2}		12^{1}	19^{1}	10^{1}	5^{1}	DNS	24^{2}	42
19	(Japan) No. 96 K-tunes Racing	6^{1}	13^{2}	16^{1}	Ret	15^{1}	14^{1}	Ret	17^{1}	13^{1}	37
20	(Japan) No. 62 HELM Motorsports	19^{2}	Ret	11^{1}	19^{1}	12^{1}	15^{1}	10^{2}	13^{1}	15^{1}	37
21	(Japan) No. 9 Pacific Racing Team	5^{1}	18^{3}		22^{1}	13^{1}	21^{1}	16^{2}	23^{3}	17^{1}	28.5
22	(Japan) No. 360 Tomei Sports	18^{2}	12^{2}	18^{2}	20^{1}	20^{1}	19^{1}	14^{2}	Ret	19^{1}	23
23	(Japan) No. 31 apr	22^{2}	19^{3}	12^{1}	17^{1}	Ret	17^{1}	23^{3}	DSQ	18^{1}	17.5
24	(Japan) No. 30 apr	20^{2}	16^{3}		17^{1}	24^{1}	Ret	13^{2}	22^{2}	23^{2}	15
25	(Japan) No. 25 Hoppy Team Tsuchiya	15^{2}	22^{3}		25^{1}	23^{1}	20^{1}	20^{3}	15^{1}	DNS	15
26	(Japan) No. 48 Nilzz Racing	23^{3}	21^{3}		26^{2}	22^{1}	22^{2}	19^{3}	18^{2}	22^{2}	11.5
27	(Japan) No. 22 R’Qs Motor Sport	25^{3}	20^{3}		23^{1}	25^{1}	23^{2}	17^{2}	19^{2}	Ret	10.5
28	(Japan) No. 20 SHADE Racing	Ret	17^{3}		16^{1}	21^{1}	DNS	Ret		25^{2}	6
Guest teams ineligible to score points
—	(New Zealand) No. 611 EBM GIGA Racing			17^{1}							0
—	(New Zealand) No. 333 EBM GIGA Racing			19^{2}							0
Rank	Team	OKA	FUJ	SEP	SPRINT		SUZ	SUG	AUT	MOT	Points
