= Hironobu Shimizu =

Japanese racing driver

- Nationality: (Japan) Japanese
- Born: 8 May 2004 (age 22) Japan

Super GT - GT300 career
- Debut season: 2025
- Current team: Tomei Sports
- Car number: 360
- Starts: 4
- Wins: 0
- Podiums: 0
- Poles: 0
- Fastest laps: 0
- Best finish: 29th in 2025

Previous series
- 2023-24: F4 Japanese Championship

Hironobu Shimizu (清水 啓伸, Shimizu Hironobu; born 8 May 2005) is a Japanese racing driver.

== Racing record ==
=== Career summary ===
Season	Series	Team	Races	Wins	Poles	FLaps	Podiums	Points	Position
2023	F4 Japanese Championship	Drago Corse	14	0	0	0	0	0	21st
2024	F4 Japanese Championship	Drago Corse	14	1	0	1	2	97	6th
2025	Super GT - GT300	Tomei Sports	4	0	0	0	0	4	29th
2025	Super Taikyu - ST-3	Okabe Jidosha Motorsport							
2026	Super Taikyu - ST-Z	Aoyama Gakuin Automobile Club							
2026	Super GT - GT300	Tomei Sports	1	0	0	0	0	0	NC
Ref:

^{*} Season still in progress.
‡ Team standings.

=== Complete F4 Japanese Championship results ===
(key) (Races in bold indicate pole position) (Races in italics indicate fastest lap)

Year	Team	1	2	3	4	5	6	7	8	9	10	11	12	13	14	DC	Pts
2023	Drago Corse	FUJ1; 1 Ret	FUJ1; 2; 11	SUZ; 1; 12	SUZ; 2; 14	FUJ2; 1; 22	FUJ2; 2; 18	SUZ2; 1; 13	SUZ2; 2; 18	SUG; 1; 14	SUG; 2; 16	AUT; 1; 22	AUT; 2; 28	MOT; 1; 15	MOT; 2; 21	21st	0
2024	Drago Corse	FUJ1; 1; 4	FUJ1; 2; 2	SUZ; 1; 5	SUZ; 2; 5	FUJ2; 1; 4	FUJ2; 2; 1	SUG; 1; 13	SUG; 2; 13	AUT; 1; 11	MOT; 1; 9	MOT; 2; 17	MOT; 3; 9	SUZ2; 1; 7	SUZ2; 2 Ret	6th	97

=== Complete Super GT results ===
Year	Team	Car	Class	1	2	3	4	5	6	7	8	9	DC	Pts
2025	Tomei Sports	Nissan GT-R Nismo GT3	GT300	OKA	FUJ; 12	SEP	FS1 (20)	FS2; 20	SUZ	SUG	AUT; Ret	MOT; 19	29th	4
2026	Tomei Sports	Nissan GT-R Nismo GT3	GT300	OKA	FUJ	FUJ; 18	SUZ	SUG	AUT	MOT	MOT		NC	0
