= K2 R&D =

Japanese racing team

K2 R&D LEON Racing
- Founded: 6 April 1994
- Base: Gotemba, Shizuoka Prefecture
- Team principal(s): Haruki Kurosawa
- Founder(s): Motoharu Kurosawa
- Current series: Super GT
- Former series: Asian Le Mans Series
- Current drivers: Naoya Gamou; Togo Suganami
- Teams' Championships: 2018 Super GT; 2025 Super GT
- Drivers' Championships: 2018 Super GT; 2025 Super GT

K2 R&D is a Japanese racing team that competes in the GT300 class of Super GT together with lifestyle brand Leon, under the name K2 R&D LEON Racing.

The team has won the GT300 class championship two times, in 2018 and 2025.

== History ==
=== Super GT ===
In 2012, LEON Racing first participated in the GT300 class of SUPER GT jointly with Hironori Takeuchi's SHIFT Team. The team manager was Motoharu Kurosawa, and the car was the Mercedes-Benz SLS AMG. The team competed under the banner of Green Tec & LEON with SHIFT. The drivers were Takeuchi himself, and Haruki Kurosawa who is the manager's son, along with Akihiko Nakatani as the third driver for Round 5. LEON Racing ended their partnership with SHIFT following the 2012 season. The team joined forces with by K2 R&D Co. Ltd., and fielded the number 62 Mercedes-Benz SLS AMG GT3 for Haruki Kurosawa and Masanobu Kato. In 2014, the car number was changed to 65 and the main driver remained Haruki Kurosawa, while the second driver was changed in quick succession to Kyosuke Mineo (Rounds 1–2), Tsubasa Kurosawa (Rounds 2–7), and Naoya Gamou (Round 8). The team achieved a podium finish in the 4th race in SUGO. In 2015, the director changed from Motoharu Kurosawa to Daisuke Endo. Haruki Kurosawa retained the seat, and the second driver became Naoya Gamou. Both finished on the podium in 2nd place at the second race at Fuji Speedway.

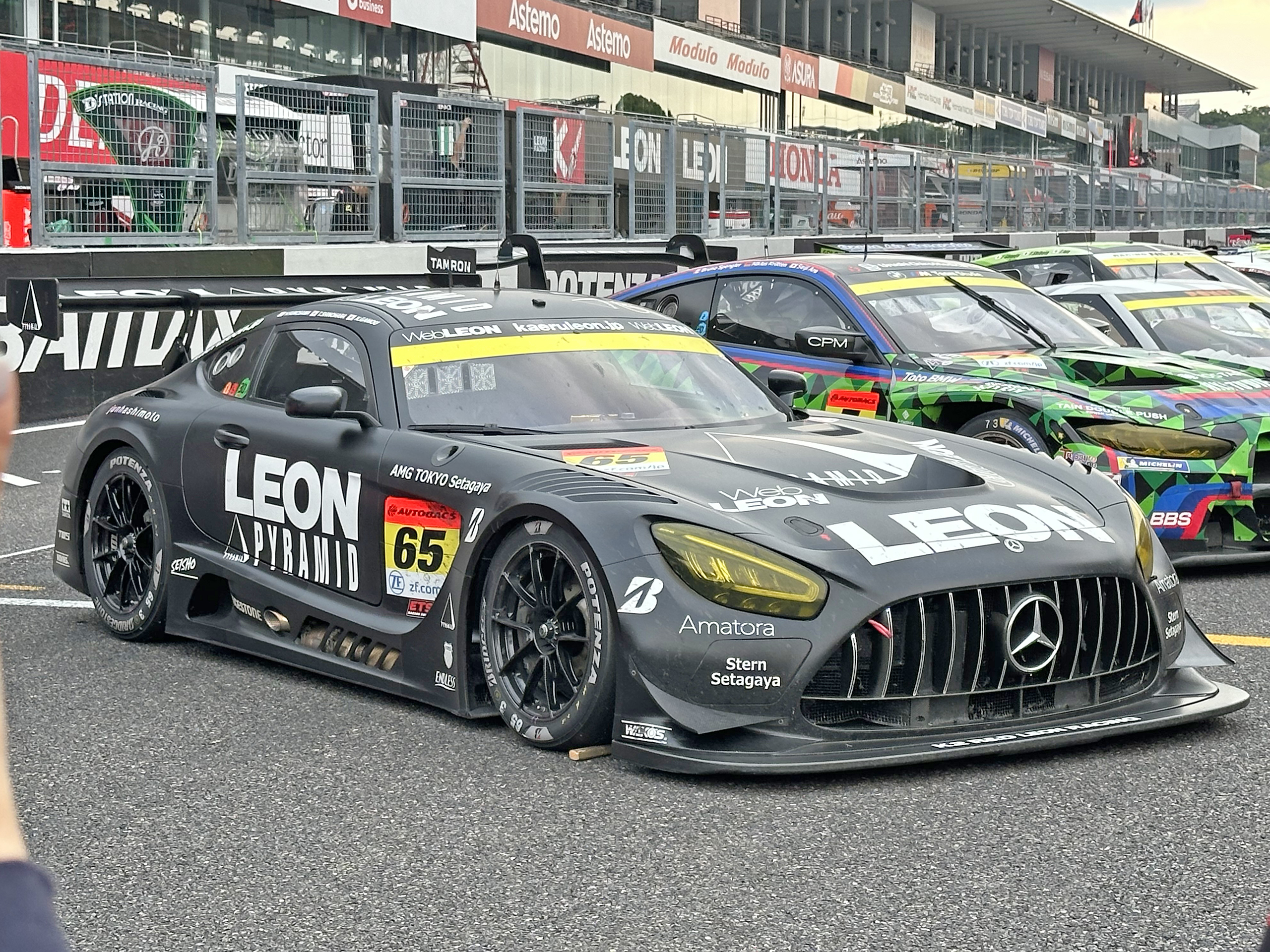
The Mercedes AMG GT3 raced by LEON Racing from 2016 onwards.

Beginning in 2016, the team began racing the new Mercedes-AMG GT3. The team switched from Yokohama to Bridgestone tyres in 2017. Both Kurosawa & Gamou took pole position in the opening race and placed 2nd in the race. At the 6th race, the Suzuka 1000 km, they made a trick of pitting on the first lap, which turned out to be a good idea, and excellent pace allowed them to overtake Tsuchiya Engineering's VivaC 86 MC to win the race and take the top spot in the points rankings once again. However, in the next race in Thailand, the team made the mistake of lowering the jack while changing tires during pit work, and GOODSMILE RACING & Team UKYO, allowing the latter to lead by a large margin. In the final race, two front wheels were changed, and in the final stages Gamou caught ARTA's no-stopping car and took the lead, winning the race, but GOODSMILE RACING & Team UKYO finished in 3rd place, so they missed out on the title. They finished 2nd in the championship, the highest in team history that time.

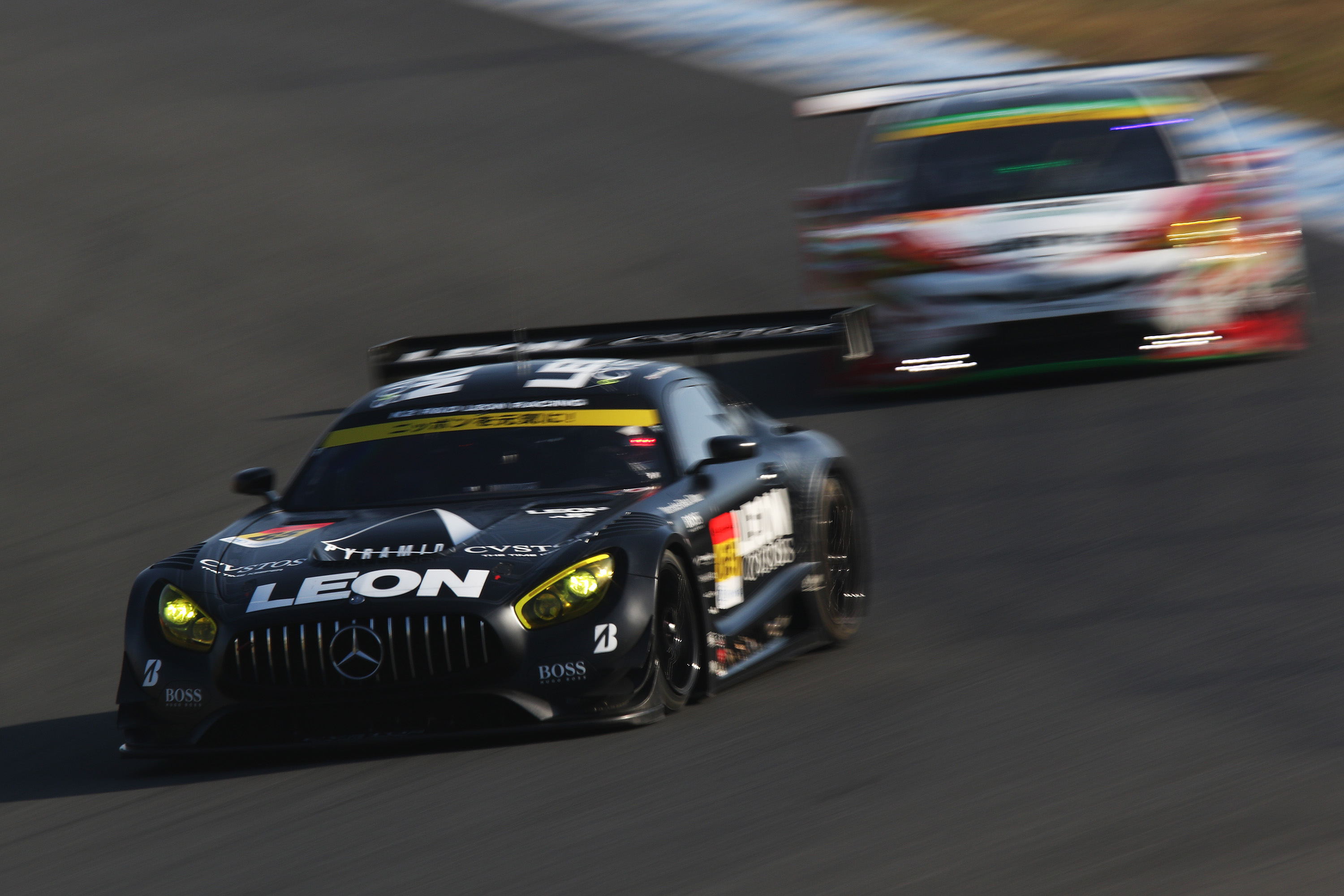
LEON Racing during their 2018 Super GT championship-winning season

In 2018, the team entered the final race in 2nd place in the standings, but there was a 12-point difference from car No. 55 in first place in the rankings. The conditions were tough, with the difference in points between 3rd place and lower, depending on the winning position and the No. 55 car. However, in qualifying, car No. 55 sank to 10th place, while it took 2nd place. In the race, they had trouble with car No. 0 right after the start, which caused them to drop in the rankings, but they were helped by the troubles of car No. 88, which was running in the lead, and were able to take the lead by staying in front of car No. 0 through a strategy of not changing tires. They overcame cars No. 31 and No. 0, which were also competing for the title, to take their first win of the season, while car No. 55 finished in 8th place, making them both the team's first to win the double titles of Driver's Champion and Team Champion, with drivers Haruki Kurosawa and Naoya Gamou.

For 2019, the team originally keep their same winning line up, but Togo Suganami replaced Kurosawa for the last two rounds of the season. From the 2020 season, the team race in the new AMG GT3 EVO. The team keept Gamou, and made Suganami the second driver. Takuro Shinohara transferred from Audi Team Hitotsuyama to K2 R&D LEON Racing, taking the place of Togo Suganami. Team director, Haruki Kurosawa, entered the fifth round at Suzuka as the team's third driver. It marked Kurosawa's first Super GT appearance as a driver since the 2019 Fuji GT 500 Mile Race.

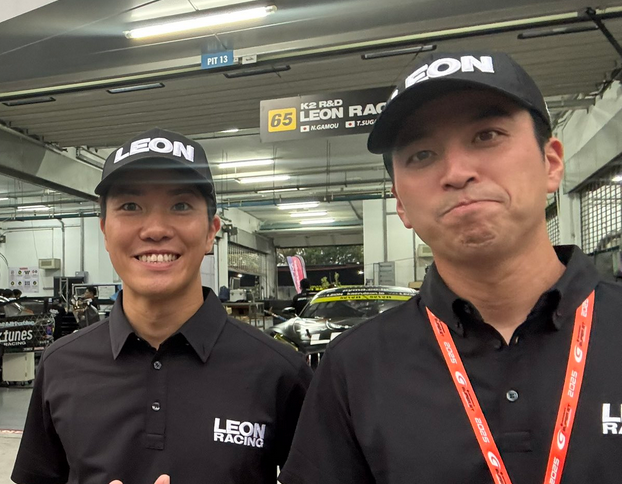
LEON Racing's 2025 GT300 championship-winning drivers Togo Suganami and Naoya Gamou

For 2025, Suganami returned, taking the place of Shinohara. The team won the season-opener at Okayama, and later finished in the podium twice at both Fuji Sprint races. K2 R&D LEON Racing won the 2025 Super GT Championship in the GT300 class, with drivers Naoya Gamou and Togo Suganami.

=== Asian Le Mans ===
K2 R&D made their other series debut outside Japan in 2019. They competed in Asian Le Mans Series under the K2 Uchino Racing, where they field Haruki Kurosawa and Shaun Thong to compete in the LMP2 class. The team would continue again the LMP2 program, where they would work together with Ponos Racing for 2025–26 Asian Le Mans Series season. They will field Ponos gaming owner Yorikatsu Tsujiko, Kei Cozzolino, and Marino Sato.
