= Natsu Sakaguchi =

Japanese racing driver (born 1995)

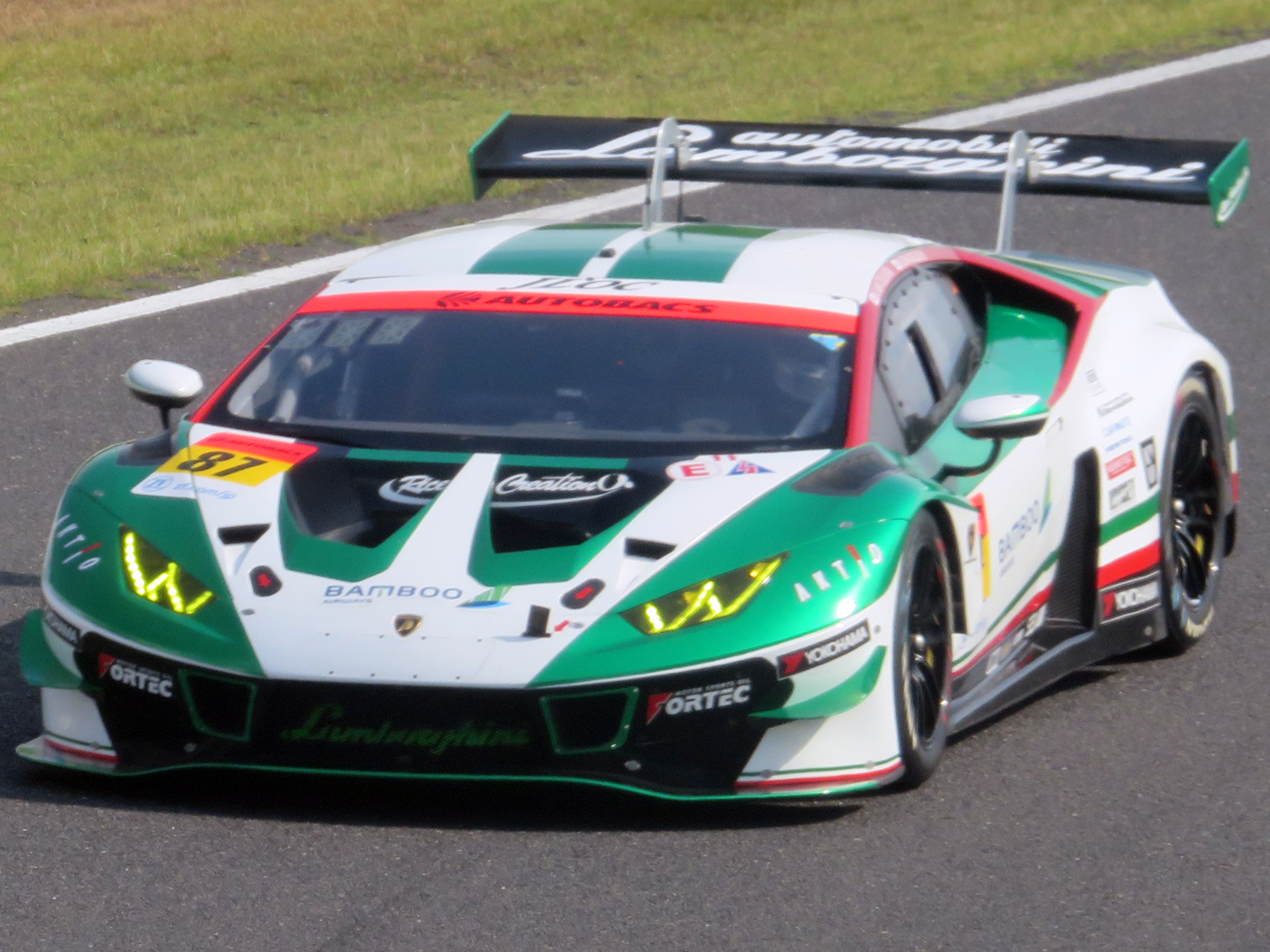
- Sakaguchi in 2022
- Nationality: (Japan) Japanese
- Born: 8 September 1995 (age 31) Fukuoka Prefecture, Japan
- Categorisation: FIA Silver

Natsu Sakaguchi (坂口 夏月, Sakaguchi Natsu; born 8 September 1995 in Fukuoka Prefecture) is a Japanese racing driver who last competed for JLOC in Super GT.

== Career ==
Sakaguchi made his single-seater debut in 2012, racing in the Super FJ Suzuka Series, finishing fourth in points after winning the season finale. After finishing second in the Japanese Grand Prix-supporting Super FJ Challenge Cup the following year, Sakaguchi was awarded the Honda SRS-F scholarship to compete in JAF Formula 4 in 2014. Following a sixth-place points finish in the overall standings in JAF Formula 4, Sakaguchi made a one-off return to the Super FJ Suzuka Series, winning from pole position for Take First.

Following one year on the sidelines, Sakaguchi made his racing return in 2017 by joining Team Mach in the GT300 class of Super GT alongside Kiyoto Fujinami. At Autopolis, Sakaguchi finished eighth, scoring his first points in the series and the team's first in seven years. Remaining with Team Mach for 2018, Sakaguchi was joined by Yuya Hiraki for his second season in the series. At the penultimate round of the season at Autopolis, Sakaguchi ran as high as second and finished the race a then-career best seventh.

In 2019, Sakaguchi was retained by Team Mach alongside Hiraki. Three rounds into the season, Sakaguchi took his maiden podium in GT300, finishing second at Suzuka and taking Team Mach's best result in Super GT. Sakaguchi remained with Team Mach for 2020, pairing up with Hiraki for the third season in a row. At the opening round of the season at Fuji, Sakaguchi scored his second career podium by finishing third, which enabled him to end the season 14th in the standings.

After spending four seasons with Team Mach, Sakaguchi switched to JLOC for 2021, partnering Kosuke Matsuura. Sakaguchi's best result of the season came at Sugo, where he finished fourth in what was his only points scoring result of the season. During 2021, Sakaguchi also won the Fuji 24 Hours overall. Sakaguchi remained with JLOC and Matsuura for the 2022 season. Having finished in the points three times in the first part of the season, Sakaguchi scored a podium at Motegi, finishing runner-up in the season-finale. In early 2023, JLOC retained both Sakaguchi and Matsuura for that year's Super GT season. At the fifth round of the season at Suzuka, Sakaguchi took his fourth career podium by taking second place behind Team UpGarage.

For the third consecutive season, JLOC retained the Sakaguchi-Matsuura pairing for their number 87 car. Having qualified second for the Fuji 350km race, Sakaguchi finished sixth in his last race with the Huracan Evo before switching to the Evo2 from the fifth round onwards. With the Evo2, Sakaguchi finished fourth in the penultimate round of the season at Motegi and ended the season 11th in the standings. Ahead of the 2025 season, it was announced that Sakaguchi would remain with JLOC and Matsuura as they would drive the Huracan Evo2 for the full season. In his first full season with the Huracan Evo2, Sakaguchi scored a best result of seventh at Okayama as he ended the year 20th in points.

Sakaguchi remained with JLOC for the following year, as he became the team's third driver for their #88 car.

== Racing record ==
=== Racing career summary ===
Season	Series	Team	Races	Wins	Poles	F/Laps	Podiums	Points	Position
2012	Super FJ – Suzuka Series		6	1	0	0	1	50	4th
2013	F1 Grand Prix Super FJ Challenge Cup	ART GP Japan	1	0	0	0	1	N/A	**2nd**
2014	JAF Formula 4 East - FC	HFDP Racing	5	0	–**	–**	0	42	6th
2014	JAF Formula 4 West - FC	HFDP Racing	6	0	–**	–**	2	55	5th
2014	JAF Formula 4 Overall - FC	HFDP Racing	11	0	–**	–**	2	97	6th
2015	Super FJ – Suzuka Series	Take First	1	1	0	0	1	20	9th
2017	Super GT – GT300	Team Mach	7	0	0	0	0	3	23rd
2018	Super GT – GT300	Team Mach	7	0	0	0	0	4	20th
2019	Super GT – GT300	Team Mach	7	0	0	0	1	15	21st
2020	Super GT – GT300	Team Mach	8	0	0	0	1	19	14th
2020	Super Taikyu – ST-X	GTNET Motor Sports	1	0	0	0	1	82.5‡	**3rd‡**
2021	Super GT – GT300	JLOC	8	0	0	0	0	8	20th
2021	Super Taikyu – ST-X	GTNET Motor Sports	1	1	0	0	1	82‡	4th‡
2022	Super GT – GT300	JLOC	8	0	0	0	1	23	15th
2022	Super Taikyu – ST-X	GTNET Motor Sports	5	1	0	4	3	97.5‡	4th‡
2023	Super GT – GT300	JLOC	8	0	0	0	1	19	15th
2023	Super Taikyu – ST-X	GTNET Motor Sports	6	0	0	2	2	89‡	5th‡
2024	Super GT – GT300	JLOC	8	0	0	1	0	26	11th
2024	Super Taikyu – ST-X	GTNET Motor Sports	5	1	2	3	2	107.5‡	5th‡
2024	Toyota Gazoo Racing GR86/BRZ Cup	4MINUTES Co., Ltd. R&D	8	0	0	0	0	0	NC
2025	Super GT – GT300	JLOC	8	0	0	0	0	29	20th
2025	Super Taikyu – ST-X	GTNET Motor Sports	3	0	0	0	0	26‡	5th‡
2025	SRO Japan Cup – GT3	Galah Racing With GTNET	2	0	0	0	0	0	NC
2026	Super GT – GT300	JLOC	2	0	0	0	0	0	NC
2026	Super Taikyu – ST-X	GTNET MotorSports							
2026	SRO Japan Cup – GT3 Pro-Am	GalahRacing	2	0	0	0	0	8	12th

‡ Team standings

** The FC class was a class using modified Formula Challenge Japan's FC106 chassis and running with the JAF Formula 4's "C" class, an upper grade class. So, there were neither pole position nor fastest lap.

=== Complete Super GT results ===
(key) (Races in bold indicate pole position) (Races in italics indicate fastest lap)

Year	Team	Car	Class	1	2	3	4	5	6	7	8	9	DC	Pts
2017	Team Mach	Toyota 86 MC	GT300	OKA; 17	FSW; 19	AUT; 8	SUG; 12	FSW; 28	SUZ; 22	CHA	TRM; 15		23rd	3
2018	Team Mach	Toyota 86 MC	GT300	OKA; Ret	FUJ; 12	SUZ; Ret	CHA	FUJ; 19	SUG; 22	AUT; 7	MOT; 18		20th	4
2019	Team Mach	Toyota 86 MC GT300	GT300	OKA; Ret	FUJ; Ret	SUZ; 2	CHA	FUJ; 17	AUT; 17	SUG; 18	MOT; 14		21st	15
2020	Team Mach	Toyota 86 MC GT300	GT300	FUJ; 3	FUJ; 11	SUZ; 29	MOT; 23	FUJ; 15	SUZ; 4	MOT; Ret	FUJ; Ret		14th	19
2021	JLOC	Lamborghini Huracán GT3 Evo	GT300	OKA; 21	FSW; 15	TRM; Ret	SUZ; 16	SUG; 4	AUT; 25	TRM; Ret	FSW; 15		20th	8
2022	JLOC	Lamborghini Huracán GT3 Evo	GT300	OKA; 8	FSW; 12	SUZ; 16	FSW; 8	SUZ; 9	SUG; 19	AUT; 11	TRM; 2		15th	23
2023	JLOC	Lamborghini Huracán GT3 Evo	GT300	OKA; 7	FSW; Ret	SUZ; 23	FSW; 16	SUZ; 2	SUG; 19	AUT; 19	TRM; 21		15th	19
2024	JLOC	Lamborghini Huracán GT3 Evo	GT300	OKA; 7	FSW; 8	SUZ; 21	FSW; 6^{2}						11th	26
2024	JLOC	Lamborghini Huracán GT3 Evo2	GT300					SUG; 7	AUT; 13	MOT; 4	SUZ; Ret		11th	26
2025	JLOC	Lamborghini Huracán GT3 Evo2	GT300	OKA; 7	FUJ; 25	SEP; 9	FS1 (21)	FS2; 14	SUZ; 16	SUG; 18	AUT; 9	MOT; 11	20th	29
2026	JLOC	Lamborghini Huracán GT3 Evo 2	GT300	OKA	FUJ; 24	FUJ	SUZ	SUG	AUT; DSQ	MOT	MOT		NC	0
