= Kazuki Oki =

Japanese racing driver from Yokohama (born 1994)

- Nationality: Japan
- Born: January 12, 2002 (age 24) Aichi, Japan

Super GT GT300 career
- Debut season: 2024
- Current team: GAINER
- Car number: 11
- Starts: 9
- Wins: 0
- Podiums: 0
- Poles: 0
- Fastest laps: 0
- Best finish: 21st in 2025

Previous series
- 2023 2022-2023: GT World Challenge Asia - GT4; Formula Regional Japanese Championship

Kazuki Oki (大木 一輝, Ohki Kazuki) (born 1 December 2002) is a Japanese racing driver who is set to compete for GAINER in Super GT. Oki previously raced in Super Taikyu ST-X with Team Impul.

== Career ==
=== Formula Regional ===
Oki started his formula racing career in 2022 Formula Regional Japanese Championship with TOM'S where he shared with Yorikatsu Tsujiko. On his fifth race, he clinched his first win in Sportsland SUGO, and another in the final race in Suzuka Circuit. Oki continued to race with Ponos Racing, as he raced for two rounds to replace Tsujiko. He also won in his first race.

=== Super Taikyu ===
Oki made his full season racing debut in Super Taikyu ST-X on 2023 for Naniwa Denso Team Impul alongside Yuki Tanaka, and Super GT champion Kazuki Hiramine. Oki continued to race with the same team for 2024.

=== GT World Challenge Asia ===
Oki raced in 2023 GT World Challenge Asia on Okayama with Comet Racing's Mercedes-AMG GT4 alongside Risa Oogushi.

=== Super GT ===
In 2024, Oki was announced to be the driver for GAINER team alongside Ryuichiro Tomita and Keishi Ishikawa for the last round at Suzuka. Oki did not race on the weekend, but would make his season debut in 2025, where he replaced Ishikawa.

== Racing record ==
=== Racing career summary ===
Season	Series	Team	Races	Wins	Poles	F/Laps	Podiums	Points	Position
2022	Formula Regional Japanese Championship	TOM'S Formula	8	1	2	1	3	102	7th
2022	Super Taikyū - ST-Z	Techno First	5	1	1	0	1	53‡	8th‡
2023	Formula Regional Japanese Championship	PONOS Racing	5	1	1	0	3	61.5	7th
2023	Super Taikyū - ST-Z	Team Impul	6	0	0	0	1	59.5‡	7th‡
2023	GT World Challenge Asia - GT4	Comet Racing	2	0	0	0	0	0	NC
2024	Super Taikyu - ST-Z	Team Impul	7	0	0	0	3	71.5‡	7th‡
2024	Super GT - GT300	GAINER	1	0	0	0	0	0	NC
2025	Super GT - GT300	GAINER	8	0	0	0	0	26	21st
2025	Super Taikyu - ST-Z	Team Impul	7	0	0	0	1	62.5‡	6th‡
2026	Super GT - GT300	GAINER	8	0	1	2	1	46	14th
2026	Super Taikyu - ST-Z	Team Impul						‡	‡

‡ Team standings.

=== Complete Formula Regional Japanese Championship results ===
(key) (Races in bold indicate pole position) (Races in italics indicate fastest lap)

Year	Entrant	1	2	3	4	5	6	7	8	9	10	11	12	13	14	15	16	17	Pos	Points
2022	TOM'S Formula	FUJ1; 1	FUJ1; 2	FUJ1; 3	OKA; 1	OKA; 2	OKA; 3	MOT; 1; 4	MOT; 2; 2	MOT; 3; 4	SUG; 1; 8	**SUG**; **2**; 1	SUG; 3; 7	FUJ2; 1	FUJ2; 2	FUJ2; 3	**SUZ**; **1** Ret	SUZ; 2; 1	7th	102
2023	PONOS Racing	FUJ1; 1	FUJ1; 2	FUJ1; 3	**SUZ**; **1**; 1	SUZ; 2; 4	OKA; 1	OKA; 2	OKA; 3	MOT; 1	MOT; 2	MOT; 3	FUJ2; 1	FUJ2; 2	SUG; 1; 5	SUG; 2; 2	SUG; 3; 3		7th	61.5

=== Complete Super GT results ===
(key) (Races in bold indicate pole position) (Races in italics indicate fastest lap)

Year	Team	Car	Class	1	2	3	4	5	6	7	8	9	DC	Points
2024	GAINER	Nissan Fairlady Z GT300 (RZ34)	GT300	OKA	FUJ	SUZ1	FUJ	SUG	AUT	MOT	SUZ; 8		NC	0
2025	GAINER	Nissan Fairlady Z GT300 (RZ34)	GT300	OKA; 11	FUJ; 14	SEP	FS1 (12)	FS2; 19	SUZ; 10	SUG; 5	AUT; DNS	MOT; 24	21st	26
2026	GAINER	Nissan Fairlady Z GT300 (RZ34)	GT300	OKA; 19	FUJ; 14	FUJ; 19	SUZ; 9	SUG; 6	AUT; 23	**MOT**; 6	MOT; 3		14th	46

^{‡} Half points awarded as less than 75% of race distance was completed.
^{(Number)} Driver did not take part in this sprint race, points are still awarded for the teammate's result.
^{*} Season still in progress.
