= Anest Iwata =

Japanese manufacturer

Anest Iwata Corporation
- Native name: アネスト岩田株式会社
- Romanized name: Anesuto Iwata Kabushiki-gaisha
- Type: Public KK
- Traded as: TYO: 6381
- Industry: Machinery
- Founded: (May 1926; 100 years ago)
- Headquarters: Kōhoku-ku, Yokohama 223-8501, Japan
- Key people: Takahiro Tsubota (President)
- Products: Air compressors; Vacuum equipment; Coating equipment; Adhesive equipment
- Revenue: ▲JPY 25.4 billion (FY 2013) (US$ 247.1 million) (FY 2013)
- Net income: ▲JPY 2.1 billion (FY 2013) (US$ 21.1 million) (FY 2013)
- Number of employees: 1,292 (consolidated, as of September 2014)
- Website: Official website

Anest Iwata Corporation (アネスト岩田株式会社, Anesuto Iwata Kabushiki-gaisha) is a Japanese manufacturer of air compressors, vacuum pumps, spray guns, and coating systems used in industrial, automotive, and manufacturing applications. Operations are organized around air and vacuum equipment and coating-related equipment, with sales across Japan, Europe, the Americas, China, and other Asian markets.

The company also produces painting robots developed with Mitsubishi Heavy Industries.

== History ==
Anest Iwata was founded in 1926 and initially focused on coating equipment. The company later expanded into air compressors as industrialization and Motorization increased demand for pneumatic power in manufacturing and automotive production. Over time, compressors and vacuum equipment became a central part of its product portfolio alongside coating systems.

== Technology ==
The company is associated with the development and commercialization of oil-free scroll compressor technology for applications requiring clean air. Trade publications covering compressed-air systems have discussed the use of these compressors in industrial environments where oil contamination is undesirable.

== Financials ==
For the fiscal year 2025, the company reported revenue of ¥54,411 million and net income of ¥4,278 million.

== See also ==
- Air compressor
- Vacuum pump
- Spray gun
