= Weds =

Japanese wheel manufacturer

Weds Co., Ltd.
- Formerly: Nippo LTD.
- Industry: Motorsport
- Founded: 1965
- Headquarters: Ōta, Tokyo
- Products: automobile wheels
- Brands: WedsSport
- Revenue: 25.4 billion yen (2013)
- Total assets: 14.3 billion yen (2013)
- Number of employees: 272 (2013)
- Website: http://www.weds.co.jp/

Weds Co., Ltd. is a Japanese wheel manufacturer for both motorsport and street use. Weds currently produces three brands of wheels; WedsSport, Kränze, and Maverick. The company is most notable for their WedsSport line of motorsport wheels and for WedsSport's longtime sponsorship of the Super GT racing team, Racing Project Bandoh.

== History ==
Weds was founded in 1965 as Nippo LTD. The company originally produced wheels for Nissan motor company and in 1969 entered the aftermarket wheel industry as a supplier of the now defunct Elster brand of wheels. The company was renamed in 1973 to WEDS, short for World Elster Distribution System. Weds created the world's first three piece forged wheel in 1977.

In 1984 Weds created the WedsSport brand of wheels to compete in various motorsport events, and has most famously been used in the JGTC (now Super GT) since 1998 with the team Racing Project Bandoh.

== Products ==
- WedsSport - Flagship forged motorsports wheel brand.
- Kranze - High-end three-piece luxury wheel brand.
- Maverick - High-end two-piece sports wheel brand.
