= 2024 Super Taikyu Series =

Japanese sports car racing season

The 2024 Eneos Super Taikyu Series Empowered by Bridgestone was the thirty-fourth season of the Super Taikyu endurance racing championship. It began on 20–21 April at Sportsland Sugo and finished on 17 November at Fuji Speedway.

This season marked the beginning of a new three-year contract with Bridgestone to be the series' official tyre supplier. Bridgestone had taken over the supply of tyres from Hankook during the 2023 season after a fire at the Hankook manufacturing plant in Daejeon, South Korea forced them to abandon its supply.

== Calendar ==
The Super Taikyu Series announced its provisional 2024 calendar on 3 October 2023, with seven rounds held at Japan's six major motor racing circuits. Sportsland Sugo hosted the opening round of the championship on 21 April, while the five-hour race at Suzuka Circuit was moved to late September. Fuji Speedway again hosted two rounds, including the series' showcase event, the Fuji SUPER TEC 24 Hours on 25–26 May, and the season finale on 17 November.

Round	Event	Race Length	Race Format	Classes	Circuit	Date
1	SUGO Super Taikyu 4 Hour Race	4 hours	2 races	ST-X / Z / Q / 1 / 2 / 4 / 5	Sportsland Sugo	20–21 April
2	NAPAC Fuji SUPER TEC 24 Hours Race	24 hours	1 race	All	Fuji Speedway	24–26 May
3	Super Taikyu Race in Autopolis	5 hours	1 race	ST-X / Z / TCR / 1 / 2 / 4	Autopolis	27–28 July
4	Motegi Super Taikyu 5 Hours Race	5 hours	1 race	ST-X / Z / TCR / 1 / 3 / 4 / 5	Mobility Resort Motegi	7 September
5	Suzuka S-Tai	5 hours	1 race	ST-X / Z / TCR / 1 / 2 / 3 / 5	Suzuka Circuit	28–29 September
6	Super Taikyu Race in Okayama	3 hours	2 races	All	Okayama International Circuit	26–27 October
7	S-Tai Final Fuji	4 hours	1 race	All	Fuji Speedway	16–17 November

== Teams and drivers ==
On 2 April, the Super Taikyu Series published its provisional full-season entry list, featuring 69 entries.

=== ST-X (FIA GT3) ===
Team	Car	Engine	No.	Drivers	Rounds
(Japan) Zhongsheng ROOKIE Racing	Mercedes-AMG GT3 Evo	Mercedes-AMG M159 6.2 L V8	1	(Japan) Ryuta Ukai	1–2, 5–7
(Japan) Zhongsheng ROOKIE Racing	Mercedes-AMG GT3 Evo	Mercedes-AMG M159 6.2 L V8	1	(France) Giuliano Alesi	1–2, 5–7
(Japan) Zhongsheng ROOKIE Racing	Mercedes-AMG GT3 Evo	Mercedes-AMG M159 6.2 L V8	1	(Japan) Naoya Gamou	1–2, 5–7
(Japan) Zhongsheng ROOKIE Racing	Mercedes-AMG GT3 Evo	Mercedes-AMG M159 6.2 L V8	1	(Japan) Tatsuya Kataoka	1–2, 5, 7
(Japan) TKRI	Mercedes-AMG GT3 Evo	Mercedes-AMG M159 6.2 L V8	23	(Japan) "Daisuke"	All
(Japan) TKRI	Mercedes-AMG GT3 Evo	Mercedes-AMG M159 6.2 L V8	23	(Japan) Yuya Motojima	All
(Japan) TKRI	Mercedes-AMG GT3 Evo	Mercedes-AMG M159 6.2 L V8	23	(Japan) Yuhki Nakayama	All
(Japan) TKRI	Mercedes-AMG GT3 Evo	Mercedes-AMG M159 6.2 L V8	23	(Japan) Kosuke Matsuura	2
(Japan) Team HandWork Challenge	Nissan GT-R Nismo GT3	Nissan 3.8 L twin-turbocharged V6	30	(Japan) "Dragon"	6
(Japan) Team HandWork Challenge	Nissan GT-R Nismo GT3	Nissan 3.8 L twin-turbocharged V6	30	(Japan) Daiki Sasaki	6
(Japan) Team HandWork Challenge	Nissan GT-R Nismo GT3	Nissan 3.8 L twin-turbocharged V6	30	(Japan) Rin Arakawa	6
(Japan) apr	Lexus RC F GT3	Toyota 2UR 5.0 L V8	31	(Japan) Kazuto Kotaka	All
(Japan) apr	Lexus RC F GT3	Toyota 2UR 5.0 L V8	31	(Japan) Koki Saga	All
(Japan) apr	Lexus RC F GT3	Toyota 2UR 5.0 L V8	31	(Japan) Miki Koyama	1–6
(Japan) apr	Lexus RC F GT3	Toyota 2UR 5.0 L V8	31	(Japan) Hideki Nagai	1–2
(Japan) apr	Lexus RC F GT3	Toyota 2UR 5.0 L V8	31	(Japan) Hiroaki Nagai	2–7
(Japan) apr	Lexus RC F GT3	Toyota 2UR 5.0 L V8	31	(Japan) Yuichi Nakayama	2
(Hong Kong) Craft-Bamboo Racing	Mercedes-AMG GT3 Evo	Mercedes-AMG M159 6.2 L V8	33	(Canada) Dean Chen	2–6
(Hong Kong) Craft-Bamboo Racing	Mercedes-AMG GT3 Evo	Mercedes-AMG M159 6.2 L V8	33	(Japan) Kakunoshin Ohta	2–6
(Hong Kong) Craft-Bamboo Racing	Mercedes-AMG GT3 Evo	Mercedes-AMG M159 6.2 L V8	33	(Chinese Taipei) Jeffrey Lee	2–5, 7
(Hong Kong) Craft-Bamboo Racing	Mercedes-AMG GT3 Evo	Mercedes-AMG M159 6.2 L V8	33	(China) Liang Jiatong	2–5
(Hong Kong) Craft-Bamboo Racing	Mercedes-AMG GT3 Evo	Mercedes-AMG M159 6.2 L V8	33	(Australia) Jayden Ojeda	2, 6–7
(Hong Kong) Craft-Bamboo Racing	Mercedes-AMG GT3 Evo	Mercedes-AMG M159 6.2 L V8	33	(Brazil) João Paulo de Oliveira	7
(Japan) GTNET MotorSports	Nissan GT-R Nismo GT3	Nissan 3.8 L twin-turbocharged V6	81	(Japan) Kiyoto Fujinami	1–5, 7
(Japan) GTNET MotorSports	Nissan GT-R Nismo GT3	Nissan 3.8 L twin-turbocharged V6	81	(Japan) Nobuyuki Oyagi	1–3, 5–6
(Japan) GTNET MotorSports	Nissan GT-R Nismo GT3	Nissan 3.8 L twin-turbocharged V6	81	(Japan) Takayuki Aoki	1–2, 6
(Japan) GTNET MotorSports	Nissan GT-R Nismo GT3	Nissan 3.8 L twin-turbocharged V6	81	(Japan) Nobuhiro Imada	1, 3–5, 7
(Japan) GTNET MotorSports	Nissan GT-R Nismo GT3	Nissan 3.8 L twin-turbocharged V6	81	(Japan) Natsu Sakaguchi	2–5, 7
(Japan) GTNET MotorSports	Nissan GT-R Nismo GT3	Nissan 3.8 L twin-turbocharged V6	81	(Japan) Ryuichiro Oyagi	2, 6
(Japan) GTNET MotorSports	Nissan GT-R Nismo GT3	Nissan 3.8 L twin-turbocharged V6	81	(Japan) Taichi Watarai	3

=== ST-Z (SRO GT4) ===
Team	Car	Engine	No.	Drivers	Rounds
(Japan) Team Noah	Toyota GR Supra GT4	BMW B58B30 3.0 L Twin-Turbo I6	5	(Japan) Yu Kanamaru	2–7
(Japan) Team Noah	Toyota GR Supra GT4	BMW B58B30 3.0 L Twin-Turbo I6	5	(Japan) Kokoro Morita	2–7
(Japan) Team Noah	Toyota GR Supra GT4	BMW B58B30 3.0 L Twin-Turbo I6	5	(Japan) Aruga Tomita	2–7
(Japan) Team Noah	Toyota GR Supra GT4	BMW B58B30 3.0 L Twin-Turbo I6	5	(Japan) Toshiro Tsukada	2–4
(Japan) Team Noah	Toyota GR Supra GT4	BMW B58B30 3.0 L Twin-Turbo I6	5	(Japan) Riki Tanioka	2
(Japan) Team Noah	Toyota GR Supra GT4	BMW B58B30 3.0 L Twin-Turbo I6	5	(Japan) Yuji Kiyotaki	2
(Japan) Team Noah	Toyota GR Supra GT4	BMW B58B30 3.0 L Twin-Turbo I6	5	(Japan) Kazuya Shimogaki	5, 7
(Japan) Team Noah	Toyota GR Supra GT4	BMW B58B30 3.0 L Twin-Turbo I6	5	(Japan) "Hirobon"	6
(Japan) Birth Racing Project 【BRP】	Porsche 718 Cayman GT4 RS Clubsport	Porsche 4.0 L Flat-6	19	(Japan) Takeshi Suehiro	All
(Japan) Birth Racing Project 【BRP】	Porsche 718 Cayman GT4 RS Clubsport	Porsche 4.0 L Flat-6	19	(Japan) Anna Inotsume	All
(Japan) Birth Racing Project 【BRP】	Porsche 718 Cayman GT4 RS Clubsport	Porsche 4.0 L Flat-6	19	(Japan) Kazuya Oshima	All
(Japan) Birth Racing Project 【BRP】	Porsche 718 Cayman GT4 RS Clubsport	Porsche 4.0 L Flat-6	19	(Japan) Yuki Fujii	1–5
(Japan) Birth Racing Project 【BRP】	Porsche 718 Cayman GT4 RS Clubsport	Porsche 4.0 L Flat-6	19	(Japan) Kenji Suzuki	2, 4, 6
(Japan) Birth Racing Project 【BRP】	Porsche 718 Cayman GT4 RS Clubsport	Porsche 4.0 L Flat-6	19	(Japan) Koichi Okumura	2
(Japan) Team Impul	Nissan Z Nismo GT4	Nissan VR30DDTT 3.0 L Twin-Turbo V6	20	(Japan) Yuki Tanaka	All
(Japan) Team Impul	Nissan Z Nismo GT4	Nissan VR30DDTT 3.0 L Twin-Turbo V6	20	(Japan) Kazuki Oki	All
(Japan) Team Impul	Nissan Z Nismo GT4	Nissan VR30DDTT 3.0 L Twin-Turbo V6	20	(Japan) Keishi Ishikawa	1–2
(Japan) Team Impul	Nissan Z Nismo GT4	Nissan VR30DDTT 3.0 L Twin-Turbo V6	20	(Japan) Kazuki Hiramine	2–7
(Japan) Team Impul	Nissan Z Nismo GT4	Nissan VR30DDTT 3.0 L Twin-Turbo V6	20	(Belgium) Bertrand Baguette	2
(Japan) Hitotsuyama Racing	Mercedes-AMG GT4	Mercedes-AMG M178 4.0 L V8	21	(Japan) Daisuke Yamawaki	All
(Japan) Hitotsuyama Racing	Mercedes-AMG GT4	Mercedes-AMG M178 4.0 L V8	21	(United Kingdom) Sean Walkinshaw	All
(Japan) Hitotsuyama Racing	Mercedes-AMG GT4	Mercedes-AMG M178 4.0 L V8	21	(United Kingdom) James Pull	All
(Japan) Hitotsuyama Racing	Mercedes-AMG GT4	Mercedes-AMG M178 4.0 L V8	21	(Japan) Shintaro Kawabata	All
(Japan) Hitotsuyama Racing	Mercedes-AMG GT4	Mercedes-AMG M178 4.0 L V8	21	(Japan) Mako Hirakawa	2
(Japan) Hitotsuyama Racing	Mercedes-AMG GT4	Mercedes-AMG M178 4.0 L V8	21	(Japan) Sota Ogawa	2
(Japan) Porsche Team EBI	Porsche 718 Cayman GT4 RS Clubsport	Porsche 4.0 L Flat-6	22	(Japan) Shota Kitazono	All
(Japan) Porsche Team EBI	Porsche 718 Cayman GT4 RS Clubsport	Porsche 4.0 L Flat-6	22	(Japan) Rintaro Kubo	All
(Japan) Porsche Team EBI	Porsche 718 Cayman GT4 RS Clubsport	Porsche 4.0 L Flat-6	22	(Japan) Naoya Yamano	All
(Japan) Porsche Team EBI	Porsche 718 Cayman GT4 RS Clubsport	Porsche 4.0 L Flat-6	22	(Japan) Yugo Iwasawa	All
(Japan) Porsche Team EBI	Porsche 718 Cayman GT4 RS Clubsport	Porsche 4.0 L Flat-6	22	(Japan) Tsubasa Kondo	2
(Japan) Team ZeroOne	Nissan Z Nismo GT4	Nissan VR30DDTT 3.0 L Twin-Turbo V6	25	(Japan) Tadao Uematsu	All
(Japan) Team ZeroOne	Nissan Z Nismo GT4	Nissan VR30DDTT 3.0 L Twin-Turbo V6	25	(Japan) Tsugio Matsuda	All
(Japan) Team ZeroOne	Nissan Z Nismo GT4	Nissan VR30DDTT 3.0 L Twin-Turbo V6	25	(Japan) Kimiya Sato	All
(Japan) Team ZeroOne	Nissan Z Nismo GT4	Nissan VR30DDTT 3.0 L Twin-Turbo V6	25	(Japan) Teppei Natori	All
(Japan) Team ZeroOne	Nissan Z Nismo GT4	Nissan VR30DDTT 3.0 L Twin-Turbo V6	26	(Japan) Ryuichiro Otsuka	All
(Japan) Team ZeroOne	Nissan Z Nismo GT4	Nissan VR30DDTT 3.0 L Twin-Turbo V6	26	(Japan) Ryuichiro Tomita	All
(Japan) Team ZeroOne	Nissan Z Nismo GT4	Nissan VR30DDTT 3.0 L Twin-Turbo V6	26	(Japan) Takuro Shinohara	All
(Japan) Team ZeroOne	Nissan Z Nismo GT4	Nissan VR30DDTT 3.0 L Twin-Turbo V6	26	(Japan) Seiji Ara	All
(Japan) Team ZeroOne	Nissan Z Nismo GT4	Nissan VR30DDTT 3.0 L Twin-Turbo V6	26	(Japan) Masataka Yanagida	2
(Japan) Techno First	Audi R8 LMS GT4 Evo	Audi 5.2 L V10	34	(Japan) Ryoma Henzan	All
(Japan) Techno First	Audi R8 LMS GT4 Evo	Audi 5.2 L V10	34	(Japan) Hironobu Yasuda	All
(Japan) Techno First	Audi R8 LMS GT4 Evo	Audi 5.2 L V10	34	(Japan) Riki Okusa	All
(Japan) Techno First	Audi R8 LMS GT4 Evo	Audi 5.2 L V10	34	(Japan) Masaki Kano	1–3, 5, 7
(Japan) Techno First	Audi R8 LMS GT4 Evo	Audi 5.2 L V10	34	(Japan) Tadasuke Makino	2
(Japan) Saitama Green Brave	Toyota GR Supra GT4	BMW B58B30 3.0 L Twin-Turbo I6	52	(Japan) Manabu Yamazaki	All
(Japan) Saitama Green Brave	Toyota GR Supra GT4	BMW B58B30 3.0 L Twin-Turbo I6	52	(Japan) Hiroki Yoshida	All
(Japan) Saitama Green Brave	Toyota GR Supra GT4	BMW B58B30 3.0 L Twin-Turbo I6	52	(Japan) Naoki Hattori	All
(Japan) Saitama Green Brave	Toyota GR Supra GT4	BMW B58B30 3.0 L Twin-Turbo I6	52	(Japan) Seita Nonaka	1–6
(Japan) Saitama Green Brave	Toyota GR Supra GT4	BMW B58B30 3.0 L Twin-Turbo I6	52	(Japan) Rin Arakawa	2, 7
(Thailand) 2W Zoomies x GR Garage Yamaguchi-Shunan	Toyota GR Supra GT4	BMW B58B30 3.0 L Twin-Turbo I6	59	(Thailand) Kachorn Chiaravanont	2, 5, 7
(Thailand) 2W Zoomies x GR Garage Yamaguchi-Shunan	Toyota GR Supra GT4	BMW B58B30 3.0 L Twin-Turbo I6	59	(Japan) Kazuhisa Urabe	2, 5, 7
(Thailand) 2W Zoomies x GR Garage Yamaguchi-Shunan	Toyota GR Supra GT4	BMW B58B30 3.0 L Twin-Turbo I6	59	(Japan) Yuji Tachikawa	2, 5, 7
(Thailand) 2W Zoomies x GR Garage Yamaguchi-Shunan	Toyota GR Supra GT4	BMW B58B30 3.0 L Twin-Turbo I6	59	(Thailand) Andrew Adulayavichitr	2
(Thailand) 2W Zoomies x GR Garage Yamaguchi-Shunan	Toyota GR Supra GT4	BMW B58B30 3.0 L Twin-Turbo I6	59	(Thailand) Warren Adulayavichitr	2
(Thailand) 2W Zoomies x GR Garage Yamaguchi-Shunan	Toyota GR Supra GT4	BMW B58B30 3.0 L Twin-Turbo I6	59	(Japan) Hibiki Taira	2
(Thailand) 2W Zoomies x GR Garage Yamaguchi-Shunan	Toyota GR Supra GT4	BMW B58B30 3.0 L Twin-Turbo I6	59	(Thailand) Nanin Indra-Payoong	5
(Japan) Buzz Progress Racing	Mercedes-AMG GT4	Mercedes-AMG M178 4.0 L V8	111	(Finland) Max Salo	1, 3–7
(Japan) Buzz Progress Racing	Mercedes-AMG GT4	Mercedes-AMG M178 4.0 L V8	111	(Japan) Taiga Imoto	1, 3–7
(Japan) Buzz Progress Racing	Mercedes-AMG GT4	Mercedes-AMG M178 4.0 L V8	111	(Japan) Nagayasu Miyagi	1, 3–4
(Japan) Buzz Progress Racing	Mercedes-AMG GT4	Mercedes-AMG M178 4.0 L V8	111	(Japan) Sota Ogawa	1
(Japan) Buzz Progress Racing	Mercedes-AMG GT4	Mercedes-AMG M178 4.0 L V8	111	(Finland) Sami-Matti Trogen	5–7
(Japan) Buzz Progress Racing	Mercedes-AMG GT4	Mercedes-AMG M178 4.0 L V8	111	(Japan) Ryosuke Moroi	5
(Japan) Buzz Progress Racing	Mercedes-AMG GT4	Mercedes-AMG M178 4.0 L V8	111	(Japan) Masaki Ano	5
(Japan) Buzz Progress Racing	Mercedes-AMG GT4	Mercedes-AMG M178 4.0 L V8	111	(Japan) Takashi Kochiya	7
(Japan) Autofactory	Mercedes-AMG GT4	Mercedes-AMG M178 4.0 L V8	555	(Japan) Jun Tashiro	1–2, 5–7
(Japan) Autofactory	Mercedes-AMG GT4	Mercedes-AMG M178 4.0 L V8	555	(Japan) Shigehiro Ikemoto	1–2, 5–7
(Japan) Autofactory	Mercedes-AMG GT4	Mercedes-AMG M178 4.0 L V8	555	(Japan) Kazutaka Tokufuji	1–2, 5–7
(Japan) Autofactory	Mercedes-AMG GT4	Mercedes-AMG M178 4.0 L V8	555	(Japan) Go Nagata	1–2, 5–7
(Japan) SHADE Racing	Toyota GR Supra GT4	BMW B58B30 3.0 L Twin-Turbo I6	885	(Japan) Hiro Hayashi	All
(Japan) SHADE Racing	Toyota GR Supra GT4	BMW B58B30 3.0 L Twin-Turbo I6	885	(Japan) Katsuyuki Hiranaka	All
(Japan) SHADE Racing	Toyota GR Supra GT4	BMW B58B30 3.0 L Twin-Turbo I6	885	(Japan) Eijiro Shimizu	All
(Japan) SHADE Racing	Toyota GR Supra GT4	BMW B58B30 3.0 L Twin-Turbo I6	885	(Japan) Morio Nitta	2

=== ST-TCR ===
Team	Car	No.	Drivers	Rounds
(South Korea) KMSA Motorsport N	Hyundai Elantra N TCR	24	(South Korea) Choi Jeong Weon	6
(South Korea) KMSA Motorsport N	Hyundai Elantra N TCR	24	(Japan) Masanobu Kato	6
(Japan) M&K Racing	Honda Civic Type R TCR (FL5)	97	(Japan) Mitsuhiro Endo	3–7
(Japan) M&K Racing	Honda Civic Type R TCR (FL5)	97	(Japan) Shinji Nakano	3–7
(Japan) M&K Racing	Honda Civic Type R TCR (FL5)	97	(Japan) Ryusuke Masumoto	3–5
(Japan) M&K Racing	Honda Civic Type R TCR (FL5)	97	(Japan) Shion Tsujimoto	3, 5–7
(Japan) M&K Racing	Honda Civic Type R TCR (FL5)	97	(Thailand) Thanasiwanat Phongsinnatchaachun	7
(Japan) M&K Racing	Honda Civic Type R TCR (FL5)	98	(Japan) "Kizuna"	3–7
(Japan) M&K Racing	Honda Civic Type R TCR (FL5)	98	(South Korea) Lee Jung Woo	3–7
(Japan) M&K Racing	Honda Civic Type R TCR (FL5)	98	(Japan) Sena Yamamoto	3–7
(Japan) Audi Team Show Apex	Audi RS 3 LMS TCR (2017)	430	(Japan) Yoshinari Fujiwara	3–7
(Japan) Audi Team Show Apex	Audi RS 3 LMS TCR (2017)	430	(Japan) Shigetomo Shimono	3–6
(Japan) Audi Team Show Apex	Audi RS 3 LMS TCR (2017)	430	(Japan) Genki Nishimura	3, 5
(Japan) Audi Team Show Apex	Audi RS 3 LMS TCR (2017)	430	(Japan) Ryosuke Kagami	3, 7
(Japan) Audi Team Show Apex	Audi RS 3 LMS TCR (2017)	430	(Japan) Shozo Tagahara	4, 5–7
(Japan) Audi Team Show Apex	Audi RS 3 LMS TCR (2017)	430	(Japan) Ayasuke Kagami	6
(Japan) Audi Team Show Apex	Audi RS 3 LMS TCR (2017)	430	(Japan) Takayoshi Kimura	7
(Japan) Team Select Hotels Group	Honda Civic Type R TCR (FK7)	888	(Japan) Toshiro Tsukada	7
(Japan) Team Select Hotels Group	Honda Civic Type R TCR (FK7)	888	(Japan) Kenta Harada	7
(Japan) Team Select Hotels Group	Honda Civic Type R TCR (FK7)	888	(Japan) Hiroshi Nakamura	7
(Japan) Team Select Hotels Group	Honda Civic Type R TCR (FK7)	888	(Japan) Osamu Kondo	7

=== ST-Q ===
The ST-Q class uses development vehicles approved by the STO.

Team	Car	No.	Drivers	Rounds
(Japan) Mazda Spirit Racing	Mazda Roadster (NDERC) CNF Concept	12	(Japan) Hiroshi Kawata	1–2, 5–7
(Japan) Mazda Spirit Racing	Mazda Roadster (NDERC) CNF Concept	12	(Japan) Ryohei Sakaguchi	1–2, 5–7
(Japan) Mazda Spirit Racing	Mazda Roadster (NDERC) CNF Concept	12	(Japan) Yuui Tsutsumi	1–2, 5–7
(Japan) Mazda Spirit Racing	Mazda Roadster (NDERC) CNF Concept	12	(Japan) Tatsuya Minowa	2
(Japan) Mazda Spirit Racing	Mazda Roadster (NDERC) CNF Concept	12	(Japan) Ikuo Maeda	7
(Japan) Mazda Spirit Racing	Mazda3 Bio Concept	55	(Japan) Kazuhiro Terakawa	1–3, 5, 7
(Japan) Mazda Spirit Racing	Mazda3 Bio Concept	55	(Japan) Yutaka Seki	1–3, 5, 7
(Japan) Mazda Spirit Racing	Mazda3 Bio Concept	55	(Japan) Kaoru Ijiri	1–3, 5, 7
(Japan) Mazda Spirit Racing	Mazda3 Bio Concept	55	(Japan) Ikuo Maeda	2–3
(Japan) Mazda Spirit Racing	Mazda3 Bio Concept	55	(Japan) Takahiro Sato	2
(Japan) ORC ROOKIE Racing	Toyota GR86 CNF Concept	28	(Japan) Eisuke Sasaki	1–3, 5, 7
(Japan) ORC ROOKIE Racing	Toyota GR86 CNF Concept	28	(Japan) Sho Tsuboi	1–3, 5, 7
(Japan) ORC ROOKIE Racing	Toyota GR86 CNF Concept	28	(Japan) Kazuya Oshima	1–3, 5, 7
(Japan) ORC ROOKIE Racing	Toyota GR86 CNF Concept	28	(Japan) Daisuke Toyoda	1–3, 5, 7
(Japan) ORC ROOKIE Racing	Toyota GR86 CNF Concept	28	(Japan) Nirei Fukuzumi	2
(Japan) ORC ROOKIE Racing	Toyota GR Yaris DAT Concept (Rd. 1); Toyota GR Corolla H2 Concept (Rd. 2–3)	32	(Japan) "Morizo"	1–3, 5–7
(Japan) ORC ROOKIE Racing	Toyota GR Yaris DAT Concept (Rd. 1); Toyota GR Corolla H2 Concept (Rd. 2–3)	32	(Japan) Masahiro Sasaki	1–3, 5–7
(Japan) ORC ROOKIE Racing	Toyota GR Yaris DAT Concept (Rd. 1); Toyota GR Corolla H2 Concept (Rd. 2–3)	32	(Japan) Yasuhiro Ogura	1–3, 5–7
(Japan) ORC ROOKIE Racing	Toyota GR Yaris DAT Concept (Rd. 1); Toyota GR Corolla H2 Concept (Rd. 2–3)	32	(Japan) Hiroaki Ishiura	1–3, 5
(Japan) ORC ROOKIE Racing	Toyota GR Yaris DAT Concept (Rd. 1); Toyota GR Corolla H2 Concept (Rd. 2–3)	32	(Japan) Masahiko Kondo	2
(Japan) ORC ROOKIE Racing	Toyota GR Yaris DAT Concept (Rd. 1); Toyota GR Corolla H2 Concept (Rd. 2–3)	32	(Finland) Jari-Matti Latvala	2
(Japan) ORC ROOKIE Racing	Toyota GR Yaris DAT Concept (Rd. 1); Toyota GR Corolla H2 Concept (Rd. 2–3)	32	(Japan) Daisuke Toyoda	6–7
(Japan) Team SDA Engineering	Subaru BRZ CNF Concept (Rd. 2) Subaru High Performance X Future Concept (Rd. 3)	61	(Japan) Kazuhiro Ito	2–7
(Japan) Team SDA Engineering	Subaru BRZ CNF Concept (Rd. 2) Subaru High Performance X Future Concept (Rd. 3)	61	(Japan) Hideki Yamauchi	2–7
(Japan) Team SDA Engineering	Subaru BRZ CNF Concept (Rd. 2) Subaru High Performance X Future Concept (Rd. 3)	61	(Japan) Takuto Iguchi	2–7
(Japan) Team SDA Engineering	Subaru BRZ CNF Concept (Rd. 2) Subaru High Performance X Future Concept (Rd. 3)	61	(Japan) Masafumi Hanazawa	2–7
(Japan) Team SDA Engineering	Subaru BRZ CNF Concept (Rd. 2) Subaru High Performance X Future Concept (Rd. 3)	61	(Japan) Koichi Hirota	2
(Japan) GR Team Spirit	Toyota GR Supra Racing Concept	92	(Japan) Keizo Kato	1–5, 7
(Japan) GR Team Spirit	Toyota GR Supra Racing Concept	92	(Japan) Shunsuke Kohno	1–5, 7
(Japan) GR Team Spirit	Toyota GR Supra Racing Concept	92	(Japan) Kenta Yamashita	1–5, 7
(Japan) GR Team Spirit	Toyota GR Supra Racing Concept	92	(Japan) Takamitsu Matsui	1–3, 5, 7
(Japan) GR Team Spirit	Toyota GR Supra Racing Concept	92	(Japan) Kazuki Nakajima	2
(Japan) GR Team Spirit	Toyota GR Supra Racing Concept	92	(Japan) Yuhi Sekiguchi	4
(Japan) NISMO	Nissan Z Racing Concept	230	(Japan) Kohei Hirate	2, 7
(Japan) NISMO	Nissan Z Racing Concept	230	(Japan) Daiki Sasaki	2, 7
(Japan) NISMO	Nissan Z Racing Concept	230	(Japan) Katsumasa Chiyo	2
(Japan) NISMO	Nissan Z Racing Concept	230	(Japan) Mitsunori Takaboshi	2
(Japan) NISMO	Nissan Z Racing Concept	230	(Italy) Ronnie Quintarelli	2
(Japan) NISMO	Nissan Z Racing Concept	230	(Japan) Satoshi Motoyama	2
(Japan) NISMO	Nissan Z Racing Concept	230	(Japan) Atsushi Miyake	7
(Japan) Team HRC	Honda Civic Type R CNF Concept	271	(Japan) Hiroki Otsu	1–2, 4–7
(Japan) Team HRC	Honda Civic Type R CNF Concept	271	(Japan) Hideki Mutoh	1–2, 7
(Japan) Team HRC	Honda Civic Type R CNF Concept	271	(Japan) Tomoki Nojiri	1
(Japan) Team HRC	Honda Civic Type R CNF Concept	271	(Japan) Shion Tsujimoto	2
(Japan) Team HRC	Honda Civic Type R CNF Concept	271	(Japan) Yohei Hashimoto	2
(Japan) Team HRC	Honda Civic Type R CNF Concept	271	(Japan) Masamichi Ishii	2
(Japan) Team HRC	Honda Civic Type R CNF Concept	271	(Japan) Shinichi Katsura	2, 4–5
(Japan) Team HRC	Honda Civic Type R CNF Concept	271	(Japan) Yusuke Mitsui	4
(Japan) Team HRC	Honda Civic Type R CNF Concept	271	(Japan) Souta Arao	5
(Japan) Team HRC	Honda Civic Type R CNF Concept	271	(Japan) Ren Sato	6
(Japan) Team HRC	Honda Civic Type R CNF Concept	271	(Japan) Takuya Izawa	7

=== ST-1 ===
Team	Car	No.	Drivers	Rounds
(Japan) K's Frontier KTM Cars	KTM X-Bow GTX	2	(Japan) Taiyo Ida	All
(Japan) K's Frontier KTM Cars	KTM X-Bow GTX	2	(Japan) Hiroki Katoh	All
(Japan) K's Frontier KTM Cars	KTM X-Bow GTX	2	(Japan) Kazuho Takahashi	All
(Japan) K's Frontier KTM Cars	KTM X-Bow GTX	2	(Japan) Hiroki Yoshimoto	All
(Japan) K's Frontier KTM Cars	KTM X-Bow GTX	2	(Japan) Takashi Kobayashi	2

=== ST-2 ===
2,400–3,500cc, front-wheel and all-wheel drive vehicles

Team	Car	No.	Drivers	Rounds
(Japan) Shinryo Racing Team	Mitsubishi Lancer Evolution X (CZ4A)	6	(Japan) Tomohiro Tomimasu	1–3, 5–7
(Japan) Shinryo Racing Team	Mitsubishi Lancer Evolution X (CZ4A)	6	(Japan) Yasushi Kikuchi	1–3, 5–7
(Japan) Shinryo Racing Team	Mitsubishi Lancer Evolution X (CZ4A)	6	(Japan) Masazumi Ohashi	1–3, 5–7
(Japan) Shinryo Racing Team	Mitsubishi Lancer Evolution X (CZ4A)	6	(Japan) Turbo Asahi	2
(Japan) Shinryo Racing Team	Mitsubishi Lancer Evolution X (CZ4A)	6	(Japan) Takahiro Matsuzawa	2
(Japan) Shinryo Racing Team	Mitsubishi Lancer Evolution X (CZ4A)	7	(Japan) Hitoshi Gotoh	1–3, 5–7
(Japan) Shinryo Racing Team	Mitsubishi Lancer Evolution X (CZ4A)	7	(Japan) Keisuke Anzai	1–3, 5–7
(Japan) Shinryo Racing Team	Mitsubishi Lancer Evolution X (CZ4A)	7	(Japan) Kazunari Yoshioka	1–3, 5–7
(Japan) Shinryo Racing Team	Mitsubishi Lancer Evolution X (CZ4A)	7	(Japan) Hisahiko Usui	1–3, 5–7
(Japan) Shinryo Racing Team	Mitsubishi Lancer Evolution X (CZ4A)	7	(Japan) Kazuaki Kimura	2
(Japan) Shinryo Racing Team	Mitsubishi Lancer Evolution X (CZ4A)	7	(Japan) Tatsuya Okahara	2
(Japan) Endless Sports	Toyota GR Yaris (GXPA16)	13	(Japan) Masaya Hanazato	1–3, 5–7
(Japan) Endless Sports	Toyota GR Yaris (GXPA16)	13	(Japan) Mizuki Ishizaka	1–3, 5–7
(Japan) Endless Sports	Toyota GR Yaris (GXPA16)	13	(Japan) Hitoshi Okada	1–3, 5–7
(Japan) Endless Sports	Toyota GR Yaris (GXPA16)	13	(Japan) Reimei Ito	2–3, 5–7
(Japan) HCM Uchino Racing	Honda Civic Type R (FL5)	36	(Japan) Koichi Iwama	2, 5–7
(Japan) HCM Uchino Racing	Honda Civic Type R (FL5)	36	(Japan) Toshijiro Akutsu	2, 5–7
(Japan) HCM Uchino Racing	Honda Civic Type R (FL5)	36	(Japan) Jun Doi	2, 5–7
(Japan) HCM Uchino Racing	Honda Civic Type R (FL5)	36	(Japan) Noriaki Uchino	2, 5–6
(Japan) HCM Uchino Racing	Honda Civic Type R (FL5)	36	(Japan) Yasunori Matsumoto	2, 7
(Japan) HCM Uchino Racing	Honda Civic Type R (FL5)	36	(Japan) Takuto Sakai	2
(Japan) Nihon Automobile College	Honda Civic Type R (FL5)	72	(Japan) Makoto Kanai	1–3, 5–7
(Japan) Nihon Automobile College	Honda Civic Type R (FL5)	72	(Japan) Tetsuya Yamano	1–3, 5–7
(Japan) Nihon Automobile College	Honda Civic Type R (FL5)	72	(Japan) Toshiya Nojima	1–3, 5–7
(Japan) Nihon Automobile College	Honda Civic Type R (FL5)	72	(Japan) Kenta Kawafuku	2
(Japan) Nihon Automobile College	Honda Civic Type R (FL5)	72	(Japan) Shinichi Morimoto	2
(Japan) Nihon Automobile College	Honda Civic Type R (FL5)	72	(Japan) Takumi Minamisawa	2
(Japan) Team Spoon	Honda Civic Type R (FL5)	95	(Japan) Eiji Yamada	1–3, 5–7
(Japan) Team Spoon	Honda Civic Type R (FL5)	95	(Japan) Syun Koide	1–3, 5–7
(Japan) Team Spoon	Honda Civic Type R (FL5)	95	(Japan) Piston Nishizawa	1–2, 5–7
(Japan) Team Spoon	Honda Civic Type R (FL5)	95	(Japan) Yusuke Mitsui	2–3, 5–7
(Japan) Team Spoon	Honda Civic Type R (FL5)	95	(Japan) Taketoshi Matsui	2
(Japan) Team Spoon	Honda Civic Type R (FL5)	95	(Japan) Yasunori Nakajima	2
(Japan) KTMS	Toyota GR Yaris (GXPA16)	225	(Japan) Kengo Ichijo	1–3, 5–7
(Japan) KTMS	Toyota GR Yaris (GXPA16)	225	(Japan) Shunji Okumoto	1–3, 5–7
(Japan) KTMS	Toyota GR Yaris (GXPA16)	225	(Japan) Rikuto Kobayashi	1–3, 5–6
(Japan) KTMS	Toyota GR Yaris (GXPA16)	225	(Japan) Jin Nakamura	1–3
(Japan) KTMS	Toyota GR Yaris (GXPA16)	225	(Japan) Hibiki Taira	7
(Japan) Honda R&D Challenge	Honda Civic Type R (FL5)	743	(Japan) Hiroki Ishigaki	1–3, 5–7
(Japan) Honda R&D Challenge	Honda Civic Type R (FL5)	743	(Japan) Junichi Kidachi	1–3, 5–7
(Japan) Honda R&D Challenge	Honda Civic Type R (FL5)	743	(Japan) Tensho Kobayashi	1–3
(Japan) Honda R&D Challenge	Honda Civic Type R (FL5)	743	(Japan) Hideki Kakinuma	2, 7
(Japan) Honda R&D Challenge	Honda Civic Type R (FL5)	743	(Japan) Tomoki Nojiri	2
(Japan) Honda R&D Challenge	Honda Civic Type R (FL5)	743	(Japan) Akira Bitoh	3, 5–7

=== ST-3 ===
2,400–3,500cc, rear-wheel drive vehicles

Team	Car	No.	Drivers	Rounds
(Japan) Okabe Jidosha Motorsport	Nissan Fairlady Z (Z34)	15	(Japan) Shuji Maejima	1–2, 4–7
(Japan) Okabe Jidosha Motorsport	Nissan Fairlady Z (Z34)	15	(Japan) Masaaki Nagashima	1–2, 4–7
(Japan) Okabe Jidosha Motorsport	Nissan Fairlady Z (Z34)	15	(Japan) Seiya Motojima	1–2, 4–7
(Japan) Okabe Jidosha Motorsport	Nissan Fairlady Z (Z34)	15	(Japan) Nozomi Udaka	1
(Japan) Okabe Jidosha Motorsport	Nissan Fairlady Z (Z34)	15	(Japan) Tsubasa Mekaru	2, 4–7
(Japan) Okabe Jidosha Motorsport	Nissan Fairlady Z (Z34)	15	(Japan) Ai Miura	2
(Japan) Okabe Jidosha Motorsport	Nissan Fairlady Z (Z34)	15	(Finland) Max Salo	2
(Japan) Okabe Jidosha Motorsport	Nissan Fairlady Z (Z34)	16	(Japan) Toru Tanaka	1–2, 4–7
(Japan) Okabe Jidosha Motorsport	Nissan Fairlady Z (Z34)	16	(Japan) Kazuomi Komatsu	1–2, 4–7
(Japan) Okabe Jidosha Motorsport	Nissan Fairlady Z (Z34)	16	(Japan) Tetsuya Tanaka	1–2, 4–7
(Japan) Okabe Jidosha Motorsport	Nissan Fairlady Z (Z34)	16	(Japan) Tsubasa Mekaru	1
(Japan) Okabe Jidosha Motorsport	Nissan Fairlady Z (Z34)	16	(Japan) Masaya Kono	2, 4–7
(Japan) Okabe Jidosha Motorsport	Nissan Fairlady Z (Z34)	16	(Japan) Yuya Nakajima	2
(Japan) Tracy Sports with Delta	Lexus RC 350 (GSC10)	38	(Japan) Toshiki Ishimori	1–2, 4–7
(Japan) Tracy Sports with Delta	Lexus RC 350 (GSC10)	38	(Japan) Takanobu Ishizuka	1–2
(Japan) Tracy Sports with Delta	Lexus RC 350 (GSC10)	38	(Japan) Shunsuke Ozaki	1
(Japan) Tracy Sports with Delta	Lexus RC 350 (GSC10)	38	(Japan) Yuma Shoji	2, 4–7
(Japan) Tracy Sports with Delta	Lexus RC 350 (GSC10)	38	(Japan) Sesshu Kondo	2
(Japan) Tracy Sports with Delta	Lexus RC 350 (GSC10)	38	(Japan) Takumi Shima	2
(Japan) Tracy Sports with Delta	Lexus RC 350 (GSC10)	38	(Japan) Takumi Sanada	5
(Japan) Tracy Sports with Delta	Lexus RC 350 (GSC10)	38	(Japan) Toshiki Komura	7
(Japan) Tracy Sports with Delta	Lexus RC 350 (GSC10)	39	(Japan) Shinya Fujita	1–2, 4–7
(Japan) Tracy Sports with Delta	Lexus RC 350 (GSC10)	39	(Japan) Takashi Ito	1–2, 4–7
(Japan) Tracy Sports with Delta	Lexus RC 350 (GSC10)	39	(Japan) Yuma Shoji	1
(Japan) Tracy Sports with Delta	Lexus RC 350 (GSC10)	39	(Japan) Dai Mizuno	2, 4–7
(Japan) Tracy Sports with Delta	Lexus RC 350 (GSC10)	39	(Japan) Takumi Sanada	2, 4–5, 7
(Japan) Tracy Sports with Delta	Lexus RC 350 (GSC10)	39	(Japan) Takuya Otaki	2
(Japan) Tracy Sports with Delta	Lexus RC 350 (GSC10)	39	(Japan) Yusuke Tomibayashi	5

=== ST-4 ===
1,500–2,500cc vehicles

Team	Car	No.	Drivers	Rounds
(Japan) Endless Sports	Toyota GR86 (ZN8)	3	(Japan) Hiroyuki Saka	1–4, 6–7
(Japan) Endless Sports	Toyota GR86 (ZN8)	3	(Japan) Togo Suganami	1–4, 6–7
(Japan) Endless Sports	Toyota GR86 (ZN8)	3	(Japan) Reimei Ito	1
(Japan) Endless Sports	Toyota GR86 (ZN8)	3	(Japan) Ryo Ogawa	2–4, 6–7
(Japan) Endless Sports	Toyota GR86 (ZN8)	3	(Japan) Miku Ikejima	2
(Japan) Asano Racing Service	Toyota GR86 (ZN8)	18	(Japan) Takeo Asano	1–4, 6–7
(Japan) Asano Racing Service	Toyota GR86 (ZN8)	18	(Japan) Shinnosuke Ito	1–4, 6–7
(Japan) Asano Racing Service	Toyota GR86 (ZN8)	18	(Japan) Kazumi Mikami	1–2, 4, 6–7
(Japan) Asano Racing Service	Toyota GR86 (ZN8)	18	(Japan) Shoya Suzuki	1, 3
(Japan) Asano Racing Service	Toyota GR86 (ZN8)	18	(Japan) Yuta Kamimura	2–4, 6–7
(Japan) Asano Racing Service	Toyota GR86 (ZN8)	18	(Japan) Tokazu Shiba	2
(Japan) Asano Racing Service	Toyota GR86 (ZN8)	18	(Japan) Naohisa Kondo	2
(Japan) Tracy Sports with Delta	Toyota GR86 (ZN8)	41	(Japan) Hirotaka Ishii	1–4, 6–7
(Japan) Tracy Sports with Delta	Toyota GR86 (ZN8)	41	(Japan) Yusuke Tomibayashi	1–4, 6–7
(Japan) Tracy Sports with Delta	Toyota GR86 (ZN8)	41	(Japan) Dai Mizuno	1
(Japan) Tracy Sports with Delta	Toyota GR86 (ZN8)	41	(Japan) Shunsuke Ozaki	2–4, 6–7
(Japan) Tracy Sports with Delta	Toyota GR86 (ZN8)	41	(Japan) Yuki Ohta	2
(Japan) Team G/Motion'	Toyota GR86 (ZN8)	60	(Japan) Resshu Shioya	1–4, 6–7
(Japan) Team G/Motion'	Toyota GR86 (ZN8)	60	(Japan) Masayuki Minato	1–4, 6–7
(Japan) Team G/Motion'	Toyota GR86 (ZN8)	60	(Japan) Keisuke Ohara	1–4, 6–7
(Japan) Team G/Motion'	Toyota GR86 (ZN8)	60	(Japan) Takumi Umehara	1–4, 6–7
(Japan) Over Drive	Mazda Roadster RF (NDERC)	66	(Japan) Kyosuke Inomata	1–4, 6–7
(Japan) Over Drive	Mazda Roadster RF (NDERC)	66	(Japan) Kohei Tokumasu	1–4, 6–7
(Japan) Over Drive	Mazda Roadster RF (NDERC)	66	(Japan) Takahisa Ohno	1–4, 6–7
(Japan) Over Drive	Mazda Roadster RF (NDERC)	66	(Japan) Hirohito Ito	1–4, 6–7
(Japan) Over Drive	Mazda Roadster RF (NDERC)	66	(Japan) Tatsuya Osaki	2
(Japan) Over Drive	Mazda Roadster RF (NDERC)	66	(Japan) Takayuki Takechi	2
(Japan) HMR Racing	Toyota GR86 (ZN8)	216	(Japan) "Kenbow"	1–4, 6–7
(Japan) HMR Racing	Toyota GR86 (ZN8)	216	(Japan) Kota Sasaki	1–4, 6–7
(Japan) HMR Racing	Toyota GR86 (ZN8)	216	(Japan) Tomomitsu Senoo	1–4, 6–7
(Japan) HMR Racing	Toyota GR86 (ZN8)	216	(Japan) "Ishiken"	1–2, 4, 6
(Japan) HMR Racing	Toyota GR86 (ZN8)	216	(Japan) "Naoryu"	2–3
(Japan) HMR Racing	Toyota GR86 (ZN8)	216	(Japan) Ryunosuke Yoshida	7
(Japan) SHADE Racing	Toyota GR86 (ZN8)	884	(Japan) Masahiko Kageyama	1–4, 6–7
(Japan) SHADE Racing	Toyota GR86 (ZN8)	884	(Japan) Yuji Kunimoto	1–4, 6–7
(Japan) SHADE Racing	Toyota GR86 (ZN8)	884	(Japan) Shinnosuke Yamada	1–4, 6–7
(Japan) SHADE Racing	Toyota GR86 (ZN8)	884	(Japan) Teppei Tsuruta	1–4, 6–7

=== ST-5 ===
1,500cc and below

Team	Car	No.	Drivers	Rounds
(Japan) Team Bride	Honda Fit4 RS (GS4)	4	(Japan) Yuya Ohta	1–2, 4–7
(Japan) Team Bride	Honda Fit4 RS (GS4)	4	(Japan) Kaoru Arai	1–2, 4–7
(Japan) Team Bride	Honda Fit4 RS (GS4)	4	(Japan) Takao Seto	1–2, 4–7
(Japan) Team Bride	Honda Fit4 RS (GS4)	4	(Japan) Hiroshi Ito	1–2, 4–7
(Japan) Team Bride	Honda Fit4 RS (GS4)	4	(Japan) Soichi Kurosu	2
(Japan) Team Bride	Honda Fit4 RS (GS4)	4	(Japan) Shunya Ito	2
(Japan) D.R.C EZO	Honda Fit3 RS (GK5)	11	(Japan) Hajime Omono	1–2, 4–7
(Japan) D.R.C EZO	Honda Fit3 RS (GK5)	11	(Japan) Ryohei Oshima	1–2, 4–7
(Japan) D.R.C EZO	Honda Fit3 RS (GK5)	11	(Japan) Ryoji Tashiro	1–2, 4–7
(Japan) D.R.C EZO	Honda Fit3 RS (GK5)	11	(Japan) Masaharu Nishioka	1–2, 4, 6
(Japan) D.R.C EZO	Honda Fit3 RS (GK5)	11	(Japan) Motoharu Sato	2, 5, 7
(Japan) D.R.C EZO	Honda Fit3 RS (GK5)	11	(Japan) Ryuichi Furuido	2
(Japan) Team NOPRO	Mazda2 Diesel Turbo (DJ5FS)	17	(Japan) Hideyoshi Nishizawa	1–2, 4–7
(Japan) Team NOPRO	Mazda2 Diesel Turbo (DJ5FS)	17	(Japan) Tobio Ohtani	1–2, 4–7
(Japan) Team NOPRO	Mazda2 Diesel Turbo (DJ5FS)	17	(Japan) Misaki Konishi	1–2, 4–7
(Japan) Team NOPRO	Mazda2 Diesel Turbo (DJ5FS)	17	(Japan) Toshihiko Nogami	1–2, 4–7
(Japan) Team NOPRO	Mazda2 Diesel Turbo (DJ5FS)	17	(Japan) Hiroaki Yamamoto	2
(Japan) Team NOPRO	Mazda2 Diesel Turbo (DJ5FS)	17	(Japan) Junichi Agematsu	2
(Japan) Team NOPRO	Mazda Demio (DE5FS)	37	(Japan) Johnny Ogura	1–2, 4–7
(Japan) Team NOPRO	Mazda Demio (DE5FS)	37	(Japan) Suguru Kawana	1–2, 4–7
(Japan) Team NOPRO	Mazda Demio (DE5FS)	37	(Japan) Yoshihiro Kato	1–2, 4–7
(Japan) Team NOPRO	Mazda Demio (DE5FS)	37	(Japan) Kazuhito Ishii	1–2
(Japan) Team NOPRO	Mazda Demio (DE5FS)	37	(Japan) Tatsuya Tanigawa	2
(Japan) Team NOPRO	Mazda Demio (DE5FS)	37	(Japan) Tatsuya Nogami	2, 6
(Japan) Team NOPRO	Mazda Demio (DE5FS)	37	(Japan) Hiroaki Yamamoto	4, 7
(Japan) Team NOPRO	Mazda Demio (DE5FS)	37	(Japan) Yuichi Shimizu	7
(Japan) Maple Hiroshima Racing Team	Mazda Roadster (ND5RC)	27	(Japan) Haruhiko Sugino	1, 5–7
(Japan) Maple Hiroshima Racing Team	Mazda Roadster (ND5RC)	27	(Japan) Yuga Furutani	1, 5–7
(Japan) Maple Hiroshima Racing Team	Mazda Roadster (ND5RC)	27	(Japan) Noriyuki Higuchi	1, 5–7
(Japan) Lovedrive Racing	Mazda Roadster (ND5RC)	50	(Japan) Junko Fujii	2, 5, 7
(Japan) Lovedrive Racing	Mazda Roadster (ND5RC)	50	(Japan) Shui Sato	2, 5, 7
(Japan) Lovedrive Racing	Mazda Roadster (ND5RC)	50	(Japan) Shoya Suzuki	2, 5
(Japan) Lovedrive Racing	Mazda Roadster (ND5RC)	50	(Japan) Ryoko Nakamura	2, 5
(Japan) Lovedrive Racing	Mazda Roadster (ND5RC)	50	(Japan) Yoshikazu Sobu	5, 7
(Japan) Over Drive	Mazda Roadster (ND5RC)	65	(Japan) Tatsuya Ota	1–2, 4, 5–7
(Japan) Over Drive	Mazda Roadster (ND5RC)	65	(Japan) Shuichiro Hokazono	1–2, 4, 5–7
(Japan) Over Drive	Mazda Roadster (ND5RC)	65	(Japan) Sena Kuronuma	1–2, 4, 5–7
(Japan) Over Drive	Mazda Roadster (ND5RC)	65	(Japan) Takuma Ikeda	1–2, 4, 5–7
(Japan) Over Drive	Mazda Roadster (ND5RC)	65	(Japan) Eiji Niwa	2
(Japan) Over Drive	Mazda Roadster (ND5RC)	65	(Japan) Mitsuru Nomura	2
(Japan) Team Yamato	Honda Fit3 RS (GK5)	67	(Japan) Shinya Uchiyama	1–2, 4–7
(Japan) Team Yamato	Honda Fit3 RS (GK5)	67	(Japan) Ryohei Yasui	1–2, 4–7
(Japan) Team Yamato	Honda Fit3 RS (GK5)	67	(Japan) Ryo Mukumoto	1–2, 4–7
(Japan) Team Yamato	Honda Fit3 RS (GK5)	67	(Japan) Yoshihiko Nakamura	4–5, 7
(Japan) Buzz Progress Racing	Mazda Roadster (ND5RC)	76	(Japan) Junpei Kato	1–2, 4–7
(Japan) Buzz Progress Racing	Mazda Roadster (ND5RC)	76	(Japan) Hitoshi Sakai	1–2, 4–7
(Japan) Buzz Progress Racing	Mazda Roadster (ND5RC)	76	(Japan) Masaki Ano	1–2, 4–5
(Japan) Buzz Progress Racing	Mazda Roadster (ND5RC)	76	(Japan) Takashi Nara	1, 5–7
(Japan) Buzz Progress Racing	Mazda Roadster (ND5RC)	76	(Japan) "Ken Alex"	2, 4
(Japan) Buzz Progress Racing	Mazda Roadster (ND5RC)	76	(Japan) Masakazu Sakai	2
(Japan) Buzz Progress Racing	Mazda Roadster (ND5RC)	76	(Japan) Yuki Ano	2
(Japan) Buzz Progress Racing	Mazda Roadster (ND5RC)	76	(Japan) Ryosuke Moroi	7
(Japan) Murakami Motors	Mazda Roadster (ND5RC)	88	(Japan) Hiroyuki Murakami	1–7
(Japan) Murakami Motors	Mazda Roadster (ND5RC)	88	(Japan) Daichi Okamoto	1–7
(Japan) Murakami Motors	Mazda Roadster (ND5RC)	88	(Japan) Soichiro Yoshida	1–7
(Japan) Murakami Motors	Mazda Roadster (ND5RC)	88	(Japan) Shinichi Uemura	1
(Japan) Murakami Motors	Mazda Roadster (ND5RC)	88	(Japan) Ryohei Arioka	2, 4–7
(Japan) Murakami Motors	Mazda Roadster (ND5RC)	88	(Japan) Keiji Amemiya	2
(Japan) Murakami Motors	Mazda Roadster (ND5RC)	89	(Japan) Shinichi Uemura	2, 4–7
(Japan) Murakami Motors	Mazda Roadster (ND5RC)	89	(Japan) Marie Iwaoka	2, 4–7
(Japan) Murakami Motors	Mazda Roadster (ND5RC)	89	(Japan) Takeshi Wakitani	2, 4–7
(Japan) Murakami Motors	Mazda Roadster (ND5RC)	89	(Japan) Akira Nakamura	2, 6
(Japan) Murakami Motors	Mazda Roadster (ND5RC)	89	(Japan) Yoshitsugu Kondo	2
(Japan) Murakami Motors	Mazda Roadster (ND5RC)	89	(Japan) Keiji Amemiya	4, 7
(Japan) Murakami Motors	Mazda Roadster (ND5RC)	89	(Japan) Ryotaro Sawai	5
(Japan) Murakami Motors	Mazda Roadster (ND5RC)	89	(Japan) "Makoto"	6
(Japan) Access Racing Team	Toyota Vitz (NCP131)	110	(Japan) Toshiyuki Matsuda	1, 4–7
(Japan) Access Racing Team	Toyota Vitz (NCP131)	110	(Japan) Shingo Wada	1, 4–7
(Japan) Access Racing Team	Toyota Vitz (NCP131)	110	(Japan) Taiga Kabaki	2
(Japan) Access Racing Team	Toyota Vitz (NCP131)	110	(Japan) Sota Muto	4, 7
(Japan) Access Racing Team	Toyota Vitz (NCP131)	110	(Japan) "Akita"	4, 7
(Japan) Access Racing Team	Toyota Vitz (NCP131)	110	(Japan) Takahisa Ohno	5
(Japan) Mazda Spirit Racing	Mazda Roadster (ND5RC)	120	(Japan) Junji Ueda	1–2, 4–7
(Japan) Mazda Spirit Racing	Mazda Roadster (ND5RC)	120	(Japan) Shohei Oda	1–2, 4–7
(Japan) Mazda Spirit Racing	Mazda Roadster (ND5RC)	120	(Japan) Subaru Kumeta	1–2, 4
(Japan) Mazda Spirit Racing	Mazda Roadster (ND5RC)	120	(Japan) Tatsuya Minowa	1, 4–7
(Japan) Mazda Spirit Racing	Mazda Roadster (ND5RC)	120	(Japan) Taisei Matsubara	2, 5, 7
(Japan) Mazda Spirit Racing	Mazda Roadster (ND5RC)	120	(Japan) Eiichi Honda	2, 6
(Japan) Mazda Spirit Racing	Mazda Roadster (ND5RC)	120	(Japan) Ryoto Kikuchi	2
(Japan) Honda Cars Tokai	Honda Fit4 RS (GS4)	222	(Japan) Toshiki Takeuchi	1–2, 4, 6–7
(Japan) Honda Cars Tokai	Honda Fit4 RS (GS4)	222	(Japan) Masayuki Sumi	1–2, 4, 6–7
(Japan) Honda Cars Tokai	Honda Fit4 RS (GS4)	222	(Japan) Masaki Nishihata	1–2, 4, 6–7
(Japan) Honda Cars Tokai	Honda Fit4 RS (GS4)	222	(Japan) Ryoji Matsumoto	2
(Japan) AutoLabo	Toyota Yaris (MXPA10)	290	(Japan) Yuuma Murata	1–2, 4–7
(Japan) AutoLabo	Toyota Yaris (MXPA10)	290	(Japan) Takeshi Kitagawa	1–2, 4–6
(Japan) AutoLabo	Toyota Yaris (MXPA10)	290	(Japan) Daimu Yasuda	1–2
(Japan) AutoLabo	Toyota Yaris (MXPA10)	290	(Japan) Atsuhito Otomo	1
(Japan) AutoLabo	Toyota Yaris (MXPA10)	290	(Japan) Yuichi Yoko	2, 4–7
(Japan) AutoLabo	Toyota Yaris (MXPA10)	290	(Japan) Daisuke Itō	2, 7
(Japan) AutoLabo	Toyota Yaris (MXPA10)	290	(Japan) Toshiyuki Takahashi	2, 7
(Japan) AutoLabo	Toyota Yaris (MXPA10)	290	(Japan) Ayaka Takano	4
(Japan) AutoLabo	Toyota Yaris (MXPA10)	290	(Japan) Natsuki Obi	5
(Japan) AutoLabo	Toyota Yaris (MXPA10)	290	(Japan) Yuya Yasuhara	7
(Japan) Team Select Hotels Group	Honda Fit3 RS (GK5)	888	(Japan) Takuya Shiga	1–2, 4
(Japan) Team Select Hotels Group	Honda Fit3 RS (GK5)	888	(Japan) Taro Matsunami	1–2, 4
(Japan) Team Select Hotels Group	Honda Fit3 RS (GK5)	888	(Japan) Hiroshi Nakamura	1–2, 4
(Japan) Team Select Hotels Group	Honda Fit3 RS (GK5)	888	(Japan) Takaya Kusano	1–2, 4
(Japan) Team Select Hotels Group	Honda Fit3 RS (GK5)	888	(Japan) Yasuhiro Kishima	2
(Japan) Team Select Hotels Group	Honda Fit3 RS (GK5)	888	(Japan) Yuya Ohta	2

== Race results ==
Bold indicates overall winner for the race.

Round	Circuit	Race	Overall Pole Position	ST-X Winners	ST-Z Winners	ST-TCR Winners	ST-Q Winners
1	Sugo	Group 1	(Japan) No. 1 Zhongsheng Rookie Racing	**(Japan) No. 1 Zhongsheng Rookie Racing**	did not participate	did not participate	(Japan) No. 32 ORC Rookie Racing
1	Sugo	Group 1	(Japan) Ryuta Ukai (France) Giuliano Alesi (Japan) Naoya Gamou (Japan) Tatsuya Kataoka	**(Japan) Ryuta Ukai** **(France) Giuliano Alesi** **(Japan) Naoya Gamou** **(Japan) Tatsuya Kataoka**	did not participate	did not participate	(Japan) Morizo (Japan) Masahiro Sasaki (Japan) Hiroaki Ishiura (Japan) Yasuhiro Ogura
1	Sugo	Group 2	(Japan) No. 26 Team ZeroOne	did not participate	**(Japan) No. 52 Saitama Green Brave**	did not participate	(Japan) No. 92 GR Team Spirit
1	Sugo	Group 2	(Japan) Ryuichiro Otsuka (Japan) Ryuichiro Tomita (Japan) Takuro Shinohara (Japan) Seiji Ara	did not participate	**(Japan) Manabu Yamazaki** **(Japan) Hiroki Yoshida** **(Japan) Naoki Hattori** **(Japan) Seita Nonaka**	did not participate	(Japan) Keizo Kato (Japan) Takamitsu Matsui (Japan) Shunsuke Kohno (Japan) Kenta Yamashita
2	Fuji 24h		(Hong Kong) No. 33 Craft-Bamboo Racing	**(Japan) No. 1 Zhongsheng Rookie Racing**	(Japan) No. 885 SHADE Racing	did not participate	(Japan) No. 92 GR Team Spirit
2	Fuji 24h		(Chinese Taipei) Jeffrey Lee (Japan) Kakunoshin Ohta (Canada) Dean Chen (China) Liang Jiatong (Australia) Jayden Ojeda	**(Japan) Ryuta Ukai** **(France) Giuliano Alesi** **(Japan) Naoya Gamou** **(Japan) Tatsuya Kataoka**	(Japan) Hiro Hayashi (Japan) Katsuyuki Hiranaka (Japan) Eijiro Shimizu (Japan) Morio Nitta	did not participate	(Japan) Keizo Kato (Japan) Takamitsu Matsui (Japan) Shunsuke Kohno (Japan) Kenta Yamashita
3	Autopolis		(Japan) No. 81 GTNET MotorSports	**(Hong Kong) No. 33 Craft-Bamboo Racing**	(Japan) No. 52 Saitama Green Brave	(Japan) No. 97 M&K Racing	(Japan) No. 92 GR Team Spirit
3	Autopolis		(Japan) Nobuhiro Imada (Japan) Kiyoto Fujinami (Japan) Natsu Sakaguchi (Japan) Nobuyuki Oyagi (Japan) Taichi Watarai	**(Chinese Taipei) Jeffrey Lee** **(Japan) Kakunoshin Ohta** **(Canada) Dean Chen** **(China) Liang Jiatong**	(Japan) Manabu Yamazaki (Japan) Hiroki Yoshida (Japan) Naoki Hattori (Japan) Seita Nonaka	(Japan) Mitsuhiro Endo (Japan) Shinji Nakano (Japan) Shion Tsujimoto (Japan) Ryusuke Masumoto	(Japan) Keizo Kato (Japan) Takamitsu Matsui (Japan) Shunsuke Kohno (Japan) Kenta Yamashita
4	Motegi		(Japan) No. 81 GTNET MotorSports	**(Japan) No. 81 GTNET MotorSports**	(Japan) No. 25 Team ZeroOne	(Japan) No. 430 Audi Team Show Apex	(Japan) No. 92 GR Team Spirit
4	Motegi		(Japan) Nobuhiro Imada (Japan) Kiyoto Fujinami (Japan) Natsu Sakaguchi	**(Japan) Nobuhiro Imada** **(Japan) Kiyoto Fujinami** **(Japan) Natsu Sakaguchi**	(Japan) Tadao Uematsu (Japan) Tsugio Matsuda (Japan) Kimiya Sato (Japan) Teppei Natori	(Japan) Yoshinari Fujiwara (Japan) Shigetomo Shimono (Japan) Shozo Tagahara	(Japan) Keizo Kato (Japan) Shunsuke Kohno (Japan) Kenta Yamashita (Japan) Yuhi Sekiguchi
5	Suzuka		(Japan) No. 31 apr	**(Japan) No. 31 apr**	(Japan) No. 22 Porsche Team EBI	(Japan) No. 98 M&K Racing	(Japan) No. 92 GR Team Spirit
5	Suzuka		(Japan) Hiroaki Nagai (Japan) Kazuto Kotaka (Japan) Miki Koyama (Japan) Koki Saga	**(Japan) Hiroaki Nagai** **(Japan) Kazuto Kotaka** **(Japan) Miki Koyama** **(Japan) Koki Saga**	(Japan) Shota Kitazono (Japan) Rintaro Kubo (Japan) Naoya Yamano (Japan) Yugo Iwasawa	(Japan) "Kizuna" (South Korea) Lee Jung Woo (Japan) Sena Yamamoto	(Japan) Keizo Kato (Japan) Takamitsu Matsui (Japan) Shunsuke Kohno (Japan) Kenta Yamashita
6	Okayama	Group 1	(Hong Kong) No. 33 Craft-Bamboo Racing	**(Hong Kong) No. 33 Craft-Bamboo Racing**	(Japan) No. 34 Techno First	(Japan) No. 97 M&K Racing	(Japan) No. 32 ORC ROOKIE Racing
6	Okayama	Group 1	(Canada) Dean Chen (Japan) Kakunoshin Ohta (Australia) Jayden Ojeda	**(Canada) Dean Chen** **(Japan) Kakunoshin Ohta** **(Australia) Jayden Ojeda**	(Japan) Masaki Kano (Japan) Ryoma Henzan (Japan) Hironobu Yasuda (Japan) Riki Okusa	(Japan) Mitsuhiro Endo (Japan) Shinji Nakano (Japan) Shion Tsujimoto	(Japan) "Morizo" (Japan) Masahiro Sasaki (Japan) Yasuhiro Ogura (Japan) Daisuke Toyoda
6	Okayama	Group 2	(Japan) No. 15 Okabe Jidosha Motorsport	did not participate			(Japan) No. 12 Mazda Spirit Racing
6	Okayama	Group 2	(Japan) Shuji Maejima (Japan) Masaaki Nagashima (Japan) Seiya Motojima (Japan) Tsubasa Mekaru	did not participate			(Japan) Hiroshi Kawata (Japan) Ryohei Sakaguchi (Japan) Yuui Tsutsumi
7	Fuji 4h		(Hong Kong) No. 33 Craft-Bamboo Racing	**(Japan) No. 1 Zhongsheng Rookie Racing**	(Thailand) No. 59 2W Zoomies x GR Garage Yamaguchi-Shunan	(Japan) No. 98 M&K Racing	(Japan) No. 92 GR Team Spirit
7	Fuji 4h		(Chinese Taipei) Jeffrey Lee (Brazil) João Paulo de Oliveira (Australia) Jayden Ojeda	**(Japan) Ryuta Ukai** **(France) Giuliano Alesi** **(Japan) Naoya Gamou** **(Japan) Tatsuya Kataoka**	(Thailand) Kachorn Chiaravanont (Japan) Yuji Tachikawa (Japan) Kazuhisa Urabe	(Japan) "Kizuna" (South Korea) Lee Jung Woo (Japan) Sena Yamamoto	(Japan) Keizo Kato (Japan) Takamitsu Matsui (Japan) Shunsuke Kohno (Japan) Kenta Yamashita

Round	Circuit	Race	ST-1 Winners	ST-2 Winners	ST-3 Winners	ST-4 Winners	ST-5 Winners
1	Sugo	Group 1	did not participate	(Japan) No. 225 Kobe Toyopet Motorsports	(Japan) No. 38 Tracy Sports with Delta	(Japan) No. 3 Endless Sports	did not participate
1	Sugo	Group 1	did not participate	(Japan) Kengo Ichijo (Japan) Shunji Okumoto (Japan) Rikuto Kobayashi (Japan) Jin Nakamura	(Japan) Takanobu Ishizuka (Japan) Toshiki Ichimori (Japan) Shunsuke Ozaki	(Japan) Hiroyuki Saka (Japan) Togo Suganami (Japan) Reimei Ito	did not participate
1	Sugo	Group 2	(Japan) No. 2 K's Frontier KTM Cars (Note: Car No. 2 did not complete the race. However, the car was classified as the only car in its class and was later awarded race points by the STO.)	did not participate			(Japan) No. 88 Murakami Motors
1	Sugo	Group 2	(Japan) Taiyo Ida (Japan) Hiroki Katoh (Japan) Kazuho Takahashi (Japan) Hiroki Yoshimoto	did not participate			(Japan) Hiroyuki Murakami (Japan) Daichi Okamoto (Japan) Soichiro Yoshida (Japan) Shinichi Uemura
2	Fuji 24h		(Japan) No. 2 K's Frontier KTM Cars	(Japan) No. 13 Endless Sports	(Japan) No. 39 Tracy Sports with Delta	(Japan) No. 884 SHADE Racing	(Japan) No. 17 Team NOPRO
2	Fuji 24h		(Japan) Taiyo Ida (Japan) Hiroki Katoh (Japan) Kazuho Takahashi (Japan) Hiroki Yoshimoto (Japan) Takashi Kobayashi	(Japan) Masaya Hanazato (Japan) Mizuki Ishizaka (Japan) Hitoshi Okada (Japan) Reimei Ito	(Japan) Shinya Fujita (Japan) Takashi Itoh (Japan) Dai Mizuno (Japan) Takumi Sanada (Japan) Takuya Otaki	(Japan) Masahiko Kageyama (Japan) Yuji Kunimoto (Japan) Shinnosuke Yamada (Japan) Teppei Tsuruta	(Japan) Hideyoshi Nishizawa (Japan) Tobio Ohtani (Japan) Misaki Konishi (Japan) Toshihiko Nogami (Japan) Hiroaki Yamamoto (Japan) Junichi Agematsu
3	Autopolis		(Japan) No. 2 K's Frontier KTM Cars	(Japan) No. 225 Kobe Toyopet Motorsports	did not participate	(Japan) No. 41 Tracy Sports with Delta	did not participate
3	Autopolis		(Japan) Taiyo Ida (Japan) Hiroki Katoh (Japan) Kazuho Takahashi (Japan) Hiroki Yoshimoto	(Japan) Kengo Ichijo (Japan) Shunji Okumoto (Japan) Rikuto Kobayashi (Japan) Jin Nakamura	did not participate	(Japan) Hirotaka Ishii (Japan) Yusuke Tomibayashi (Japan) Shunsuke Ozaki	did not participate
4	Motegi		(Japan) No. 2 K's Frontier KTM Cars	did not participate	(Japan) No. 16 Okabe Jidosha Motorsport	(Japan) No. 3 Endless Sports	(Japan) No. 88 Murakami Motors
4	Motegi		(Japan) Taiyo Ida (Japan) Hiroki Katoh (Japan) Kazuho Takahashi (Japan) Hiroki Yoshimoto	did not participate	(Japan) Toru Tanaka (Japan) Kazuomi Komatsu (Japan) Tetsuya Tanaka (Japan) Masaya Kono	(Japan) Hiroyuki Saka (Japan) Togo Suganami (Japan) Ryo Ogawa	(Japan) Hiroyuki Murakami (Japan) Daichi Okamoto (Japan) Soichiro Yoshida (Japan) Ryohei Arioka
5	Suzuka		(Japan) No. 2 K's Frontier KTM Cars	(Japan) No. 225 Kobe Toyopet Motorsports	(Japan) No. 39 Tracy Sports with Delta	did not participate	(Japan) No. 65 Over Drive
5	Suzuka		(Japan) Taiyo Ida (Japan) Hiroki Katoh (Japan) Kazuho Takahashi (Japan) Hiroki Yoshimoto	(Japan) Kengo Ichijo (Japan) Shunji Okumoto (Japan) Rikuto Kobayashi	(Japan) Shinya Fujita (Japan) Takashi Ito (Japan) Dai Mizuno (Japan) Yusuke Tomibayashi	did not participate	(Japan) Tatsuya Ota (Japan) Shuichiro Hokazono (Japan) Sena Kuronuma (Japan) Takuma Ikeda
6	Okayama	Group 1	(Japan) No. 2 K's Frontier KTM Cars	(Japan) No. 6 Shinryo Racing Team	did not participate		
6	Okayama	Group 1	(Japan) Taiyo Ida (Japan) Hiroki Katoh (Japan) Kazuho Takahashi (Japan) Hiroki Yoshimoto	(Japan) Tomohiro Tomimasu (Japan) Yasushi Kikuchi (Japan) Masazumi Ohashi	did not participate		
6	Okayama	Group 2	did not participate		(Japan) No. 15 Okabe Jidosha Motorsport	(Japan) No. 66 Over Drive	(Japan) No. 88 Murakami Motors
6	Okayama	Group 2	did not participate		(Japan) Shuji Maejima (Japan) Masaaki Nagashima (Japan) Seiya Motojima (Japan) Tsubasa Mekaru	(Japan) Kyosuke Inomata (Japan) Kohei Tokumasu (Japan) Takahisa Ohno (Japan) Hirohito Ito	(Japan) Hiroyuki Murakami (Japan) Daichi Okamoto (Japan) Soichiro Yoshida (Japan) Ryohei Arioka
7	Fuji 4h		(Japan) No. 2 K's Frontier KTM Cars	(Japan) No. 95 Team Spoon	(Japan) No. 15 Okabe Jidosha Motorsport	(Japan) No. 884 SHADE Racing	(Japan) No. 17 Team NOPRO
7	Fuji 4h		(Japan) Taiyo Ida (Japan) Hiroki Katoh (Japan) Kazuho Takahashi (Japan) Hiroki Yoshimoto	(Japan) Eiji Yamada (Japan) Syun Koide (Japan) Piston Nishizawa (Japan) Yusuke Mitsui	(Japan) Shuji Maejima (Japan) Masaaki Nagashima (Japan) Seiya Motojima (Japan) Tsubasa Mekaru	(Japan) Masahiko Kageyama (Japan) Yuji Kunimoto (Japan) Shinnosuke Yamada (Japan) Teppei Tsuruta	(Japan) Hideyoshi Nishizawa (Japan) Tobio Ohtani (Japan) Misaki Konishi (Japan) Toshihiko Nogami

== Championship standings ==
Championship points are awarded in every class with the exception of ST-Q at the end of each event.

For the ST-X, ST-Z, and ST-TCR championships, each team's six highest scoring rounds are validated in the final championship standings.

Points systems
Duration	1st	2nd	3rd	4th	5th	6th	7th	8th	9th	10th	≤11th	Pole
3–4 Hours / 500 km	20	15	12	10	8	6	4	3	2	1	0	2
5 Hours / 700 km	30	22.5	18	15	12	9	6	4.5	3	1.5	1	2
≥12 Hours / 1400 km	45	35	27	23	18	13	9	7	5	3	1	2

Notes

- If the final round of the championship is less than five hours or 700 kilometres, 1.5 times the regular amount of points will be awarded.

=== Teams' Championship standings ===
==== ST-X ====
Pos	Teams	SUG		24H	AUT	MRM	SUZ	OIC		FSW	Pts
Pos	Teams	G1	G2	24H	AUT	MRM	SUZ	G1	G2	FSW	Pts
1	(Japan) No. 1 Zhongsheng ROOKIE Racing	1		1			2	2		1	134.5
2	(Hong Kong) No. 33 Craft-Bamboo Racing			4	1	3	4	1		3	130
3	(Japan) No. 23 TKRI	2		2	2	2	3	4		5	125
4	(Japan) No. 31 apr	3		3	3	Ret	1	3		4	116
5	(Japan) No. 81 GTNET MotorSports	4		5	4	1	Ret	5		2	107.5
–	(Japan) No. 30 Team Handwork Challenge							Ret			–
Pos	Teams	G1	G2	24H	AUT	MRM	SUZ	G1	G2	FSW	Pts
Pos	Teams	SUG		24H	AUT	MRM	SUZ	OIC		FSW	Pts

==== ST-Z ====
Pos	Teams	SUG		24H	AUT	MRM	SUZ	OIC		FSW	Pts
Pos	Teams	G1	G2	24H	AUT	MRM	SUZ	G1	G2	FSW	Pts
1	(Japan) No. 52 Saitama Green Brave		1	2	1	7	4	2		7	128
2	(Japan) No. 885 SHADE Racing		9	1	5	8	6	8		6	82.5
2	(Japan) No. 22 Porsche Team EBI		5	5	7	5	1	6		9	82
3	(Japan) No. 34 Techno First		3	WD	8	2	2	1		Ret	81.5
5	(Japan) No. 26 Team ZeroOne		2	NC	2	6	11	9		2	75
6	(Japan) No. 21 Hitotsuyama Racing		6	7	4	4	5	DSQ		3	75
7	(Japan) No. 20 Team Impul		Ret	4	Ret	3	10	3		4	71.5
8	(Japan) No. 25 Team ZeroOne		10	NC	Ret	1	3	4		8	63.5
9	(Japan) No. 19 Birth Racing Project【BRP】		4	3	6	Ret	Ret	6		10	53.5
10	(Japan) No. 5 Team Noah			6	3	9	9	7		5	53
11	(Thailand) No. 59 2W Zoomies x GR Garage Yamaguchi-Shunan			8			8			1	41.5
12	(Japan) No. 111 Buzz Progress Racing		8		9	Ret	7	WD		12	13
13	(Japan) No. 555 Autofactory		7	NC			Ret	Ret		11	5
Pos	Teams	G1	G2	24H	AUT	MRM	SUZ	G1	G2	FSW	Pts
Pos	Teams	SUG		24H	AUT	MRM	SUZ	OIC		FSW	Pts

==== ST-TCR ====
Pos	Teams	SUG		24H	AUT	MRM	SUZ	OIC		FSW	Pts
Pos	Teams	G1	G2	24H	AUT	MRM	SUZ	G1	G2	FSW	Pts
1	(Japan) No. 98 M&K Racing				2	2	1	2		1	122
2	(Japan) No. 97 M&K Racing				1	Ret	2	1		2	103
3	(Japan) No. 430 Audi Team Show Apex				Ret	1	3	4		3	76
4	(South Korea) No. 24 KMSA Motorsport N							3			12
–	(Japan) No. 888 Team Select Hotels Group									Ret	–
Pos	Teams	G1	G2	24H	AUT	MRM	SUZ	G1	G2	FSW	Pts
Pos	Teams	SUG		24H	AUT	MRM	SUZ	OIC		FSW	Pts

==== ST-Q ====
Pos	Teams	SUG		24H	AUT	MRM	SUZ	OIC		FSW	Pts
Pos	Teams	G1	G2	24H	AUT	MRM	SUZ	G1	G2	FSW	Pts
—	(Japan) No. 92 GR Spirit Racing		1	1	1	1	1			1	—
—	(Japan) No. 32 ORC ROOKIE Racing	1		8	Ret		5	1		7	—
—	(Japan) No. 12 Mazda Spirit Racing		2	4			4		1	5	—
—	(Japan) No. 61 Team SDA Engineering			3	Ret	2	3		2	4	—
—	(Japan) No. 271 Team HRC	Ret		6		3	2	2		6	—
—	(Japan) No. 230 NISMO			2						2	—
—	(Japan) No. 28 ORC ROOKIE Racing	2		5	Ret		Ret			Ret	—
—	(Japan) No. 55 Mazda Spirit Racing		3	7	Ret		6			3	—
Pos	Teams	G1	G2	24H	AUT	MRM	SUZ	G1	G2	FSW	Pts
Pos	Teams	SUG		24H	AUT	MRM	SUZ	OIC		FSW	Pts

==== ST-1 ====
Pos	Teams	SUG		24H	AUT	MRM	SUZ	OIC		FSW	Pts
Pos	Teams	G1	G2	24H	AUT	MRM	SUZ	G1	G2	FSW	Pts
1	(Japan) No. 2 K's Frontier KTM Cars		1†	1	1	1	1	1		1	218
Pos	Teams	G1	G2	24H	AUT	MRM	SUZ	G1	G2	FSW	Pts
Pos	Teams	SUG		24H	AUT	MRM	SUZ	OIC		FSW	Pts

==== ST-2 ====
Pos	Teams	SUG		24H	AUT	MRM	SUZ	OIC		FSW	Pts
Pos	Teams	G1	G2	24H	AUT	MRM	SUZ	G1	G2	FSW	Pts
1	(Japan) No. 225 KTMS	1		5	1		1	2		6	124
2	(Japan) No. 13 Endless Sports	4		1	2		3	4		4	120.5
3	(Japan) No. 72 Nihon Automobile College	2		4	3		2	5		5	98.5
4	(Japan) No. 6 Shinryo Racing Team	7		2	Ret		Ret	1		3	87
5	(Japan) No. 743 Honda R&D Challenge	5		3	6			3		2	84.5
6	(Japan) No. 95 Team Spoon	3		Ret	4		5	7		1	73
7	(Japan) No. 7 Shinryo Racing Team	6		6	5		4	6		7	58
8	(Japan) No. 36 HCM Uchino Racing			7			6	Ret		8	22.5
Pos	Teams	G1	G2	24H	AUT	MRM	SUZ	G1	G2	FSW	Pts
Pos	Teams	SUG		24H	AUT	MRM	SUZ	OIC		FSW	Pts

==== ST-3 ====
Pos	Teams	SUG		24H	AUT	MRM	SUZ	OIC		FSW	Pts
Pos	Teams	G1	G2	24H	AUT	MRM	SUZ	G1	G2	FSW	Pts
1	(Japan) No. 39 Tracy Sports with Delta	2		1		3	1		3	2	142.5
2	(Japan) No. 38 Tracy Sports with Delta	1		3		2	2		2	3	129
3	(Japan) No. 15 Okabe Jidosha Motorsport	3		2		Ret	Ret		1	1	105
4	(Japan) No. 16 Okabe Jidosha Motorsport	Ret		4		1	3		4	Ret	81
Pos	Teams	G1	G2	24H	AUT	MRM	SUZ	G1	G2	FSW	Pts
Pos	Teams	SUG		24H	AUT	MRM	SUZ	OIC		FSW	Pts

==== ST-4 ====
Pos	Teams	SUG		24H	AUT	MRM	SUZ	OIC		FSW	Pts
Pos	Teams	G1	G2	24H	AUT	MRM	SUZ	G1	G2	FSW	Pts
1	(Japan) No. 3 Endless Sports	1		3	2	1			3	2	134
2	(Japan) No. 884 SHADE Racing	2		1	3	6			5	1	118
3	(Japan) No. 41 Tracy Sports with Delta	5		2	1	2			2	Ret	116.5
4	(Japan) No. 66 Over Drive	3		Ret	4	3			1	6	78
5	(Japan) No. 18 Asano Racing Service	6		4	Ret	4			6	4	65
6	(Japan) No. 216 HMR Racing	Ret		5	5	5			7	5	58
7	(Japan) No. 60 Team G/Motion	4		Ret		7			4	3	47
Pos	Teams	G1	G2	24H	AUT	MRM	SUZ	G1	G2	FSW	Pts
Pos	Teams	SUG		24H	AUT	MRM	SUZ	OIC		FSW	Pts

==== ST-5 ====
Pos	Teams	SUG		24H	AUT	MRM	SUZ	OIC		FSW	Pts
Pos	Teams	G1	G2	24H	AUT	MRM	SUZ	G1	G2	FSW	Pts
1	(Japan) No. 17 Team NOPRO		3	1		2	2		4	1	142
2	(Japan) No. 88 Murakami Motors		1	3		1	3		1	5	135
3	(Japan) No. 65 Over Drive		2	2		8	1		6	2	117
4	(Japan) No. 4 Team Bride		6	4		3	4		7	14	67
5	(Japan) No. 222 Honda Cars Tokai		9	5		6	7		Ret	9	38
6	(Japan) No. 27 Maple Hiroshima Racing Team		5				Ret		3	3	38
7	(Japan) No. 120 Mazda Spirit Racing		12†	9		9	5		2	Ret	36
8	(Japan) No. 76 Buzz Progress Racing		4	12		Ret	Ret		5	4	34
9	(Japan) No. 11 D.R.C EZO		10	6		5	8		10	10	33
10	(Japan) No. 37 Team NOPRO		8	13		4	6		9	12	31
11	(Japan) No. 67 Team Yamato		7	10		Ret	Ret		8	6	19
12	(Japan) No. 89 Murakami Motors			8		7	11		11	13	15
13	(Japan) No. 888 Select Hotels Group		11	7		11					10
14	(Japan) No. 110 Access Racing Team		Ret			10	Ret		12	8	6
15	(Japan) No. 50 Lovedrive Racing			NC			9				3
16	(Japan) No. 290 AutoLabo		NC	11		Ret	10		13	11	2.5
Pos	Teams	G1	G2	24H	AUT	MRM	SUZ	G1	G2	FSW	Pts
Pos	Teams	SUG		24H	AUT	MRM	SUZ	OIC		FSW	Pts
