= 2027 Super Taikyu Series =

Japanese sports car racing season

The 2027 Eneos Super Taikyu Series Empowered by Bridgestone will be the thirty-seventh season of the Super Taikyu endurance racing championship. It will begin on 27-28 March at Mobility Resort Motegi and will finish on 4-5 December at Fuji Speedway.

== Calendar ==
The Super Taikyu Series announced its provisional 2027 calendar on 6 October 2026, with seven rounds to be held at Japan's six major motor racing circuits.

Round	Event	Race Length	Race Format	Classes	Circuit	Date	Support Bill	Circuit Map
1	Motegi Super Taikyu Race	TBC	TBC	TBC	(Tochigi Prefecture) Mobility Resort Motegi	27–28 March	TBA	2027 Super Taikyu Series is located in Japan
2	NAPAC Fuji 24 Hours Race	24 hours	1 race	TBC	(Shizuoka Prefecture) Fuji Speedway	4–6 June	TBA	2027 Super Taikyu Series is located in Japan
3	Super Taikyu Race in Autopolis	TBC	TBC	TBC	(Ōita Prefecture) Autopolis	24–25 July	TBA	2027 Super Taikyu Series is located in Japan
4	SUGO Super Taikyu Race	TBC	TBC	TBC	(Miyagi Prefecture) Sportsland SUGO	28–29 August	TBA	2027 Super Taikyu Series is located in Japan
5	SUZUKA Race	TBC	TBC	TBC	(Mie Prefecture) Suzuka Circuit	2–3 October	TBA	2027 Super Taikyu Series is located in Japan
6	Super Taikyu Race in Okayama	TBC	TBC	TBC	(Okayama Prefecture) Okayama International Circuit	30–31 October	TBA	2027 Super Taikyu Series is located in Japan
7	S-Tai FINAL Big Thanksgiving	TBC	TBC	TBC	(Shizuoka Prefecture) Fuji Speedway	4–5 December	TBA	2027 Super Taikyu Series is located in Japan

== Teams and drivers ==
=== ST-Z (SRO GT4) ===
Team	Car	Engine	No.	Drivers	Rounds
(Japan) Team Impul	Nissan Z Nismo GT4	Nissan VR30DDTT 3.0 L Twin Turbo V6	20	TBA	TBC

=== ST-2 ===
2,400–3,500cc displacement - front-wheel (FWD) and all-wheel drive (AWD) vehicles.

Team	Car	Engine	No.	Drivers	Rounds
(Japan) Nihon Automobile College	Honda Civic Type R (FL5)	Honda K20C1 2.0 L Turbo I4	72	(Japan) Tetsuya Yamano	TBC
(Japan) Nihon Automobile College	Honda Civic Type R (FL5)	Honda K20C1 2.0 L Turbo I4	72	(Japan) Makoto Kanai	TBC
(Japan) Nihon Automobile College	Honda Civic Type R (FL5)	Honda K20C1 2.0 L Turbo I4	72	(Japan) Toshiya Nojima	TBC
