= Sota Ogawa =

Japanese racing driver (born 1999)

- Nationality: (Japan) Japanese
- Born: 1 October 1999 (age 27) Japan

Previous series
- 2023 2021-23 2017-20: Super Formula Lights; Formula Regional Japanese Championship; F4 Japanese Championship

Championship titles
- 2023: Formula Regional Japanese Championship

Sota Ogawa (小川 颯太, Ogawa Souta; born 1 October 1999) is a Japanese racing driver who last competed in the 2025 Super Taikyu – ST-X for Hitotsuyama Racing. Ogawa is the winner of the 2023 Formula Regional Japanese Championship.

== Career ==
Ogawa made his debut in 2017 F4 Japanese Championship with TOM'S Spirit at Motegi. Ogawa made his full season debut with TOM'S Spirit the next season, racing alongside Kazuto Kotaka. Ogawa finished in ninth place in the standings. Ogawa also made a couple of appearance in 2019 with Skill Speed. And in 2020, with the same team he scored a pole and four podiums.

In 2021, Ogawa moved up to Formula Regional Japanese Championship with Sutekina Racing Team for the second half of the season. Ogawa then won in Suzuka. Ogawa moved to Bionic Jack Racing for the next season. He finished runners up with three wins, just behind the eventual champion Miki Koyama. Ogawa stayed with the team for the 2023 season. He eventually won the title ahead of New Zealander Liam Sceats.

In 2023, Ogawa made an appearance in Super Formula Lights with Rn-sports.

In 2024, Ogawa raced in the Macau Grand Prix with TGM Grand Prix alongside Takuma Sato's son Rintaro.

== Racing record ==
=== Career summary ===
Season	Series	Team	Races	Wins	Poles	FLaps	Podiums	Points	Position
2017	F4 Japanese Championship	TOM'S Spirit	2	0	0	0	0	10	14th
2018	F4 Japanese Championship	TOM'S Spirit	14	0	0	0	0	55	9th
2019	F4 Japanese Championship	Skill Speed	8	0	0	0	0	14	13th
2020	F4 Japanese Championship	Skill Speed	12	0	1	1	4	121	4th
2021	F4 Japanese Championship	Skill Speed	14	0	0	0	0	52	10th
2021	Formula Regional Japanese Championship	Sutekina Racing Team	7	1	0	1	2	73	7th
2022	Formula Regional Japanese Championship	Bionic Jack Racing	17	3	2	1	12	280	**2nd**
2023	Formula Regional Japanese Championship	Bionic Jack Racing	16	4	11	5	12	243.5	**1st**
2023	Super Formula Lights	Rn-Sports	3	0	0	0	0	0	11th
2024	Super Taikyu Series - ST-Z	Buzz Progress Racing							
2024	Super Taikyu Series - ST-Z	Hitotsuyama Racing							
2024	Macau Grand Prix	TGM Grand Prix	1	0	0	0	0	N/A	DNF
2025	Super Taikyu – ST-X	Hitotsuyama Racing	5	0	0	0	2	58.5‡	5th‡

‡ Team standings

=== Complete F4 Japanese Championship results ===
(key) (Races in bold indicate pole position; races in italics indicate points for the fastest lap)

Year	Team	1	2	3	4	5	6	7	8	9	10	11	12	13	14	DC	Points
2017	TOM'S Spirit	OKA; 1	OKA; 2	FUJ1; 1	FUJ1; 2	AUT; 1	AUT; 2	SUG; 1	SUG; 2	FUJ2; 1	FUJ2; 2	SUZ; 1	SUZ; 2	MOT; 1; 6	MOT; 2; 9	14th	10
2018	TOM'S Spirit	OKA; 1; 5	OKA; 2; 6	FUJ1; 1; 11	FUJ1; 2; 21	SUZ; 1; 9	SUZ; 2; 9	FUJ2; 1; 4	FUJ2; 2; 5	SUG; 1; 8	SUG; 2; 10	AUT; 1; 9	AUT; 2; 12	MOT; 1; 8	MOT; 2; 24	9th	55
2019	Skill Speed	OKA; 1	OKA; 2	FUJ1; 1	FUJ1; 2	SUZ; 1	SUZ; 2	FUJ2; 1; 12	FUJ2; 2 Ret	AUT; 1; 4	AUT; 2; 31	SUG; 1; 10	SUG; 2; 10	MOT; 1 Ret	MOT; 2 Ret	13th	14
2020	Skill Speed	FUJ1; 1; 7	FUJ1; 2; 6	FUJ1; 3; 7	SUZ; 1; 7	SUZ; 2; 12	SUZ; 3; 7	MOT; 1; 5	MOT; 2; 2	MOT; 3; 2	**FUJ2**; **1**; 2	FUJ2; 2; 3	FUJ2; 3; 5			4th	121
2021	Skill Speed	FUJ1; 1; 9	FUJ1; 2; 4	SUZ; 1; 9	SUZ; 2; 12	MOT1; 1; 9	MOT1; 2; 8	MOT1; 3; 8	SUG; 1; 12	SUG; 2; 13	SUG; 3; 11	MOT2; 1; 6	MOT2; 2; 4	FUJ2; 1; 13	FUJ2; 2; 7	10th	52

=== Complete Formula Regional Japanese Championship results ===
(key) (Races in bold indicate pole position) (Races in italics indicate fastest lap)

Year	Entrant	1	2	3	4	5	6	7	8	9	10	11	12	13	14	15	16	17	Pos	Points
2021	Sutekina Racing Team	OKA; 1	OKA; 2	OKA; 3	MOT; 1	MOT; 2	MOT; 3	FUJ; 1; 9	FUJ; 2; 2	FUJ; 3; 5	SUG; 1; 12	SUG; 2; 7	SUZ; 1; 1	SUZ; 2; 4					7th	73
2022	Bionic Jack Racing	FUJ1; 1; 4	FUJ1; 2; 4	FUJ1; 3; 2	OKA; 1; 3	OKA; 2; 2	OKA; 3; 3	MOT; 1; 3	MOT; 2; 4	MOT; 3; 2	**SUG**; **1**; 1	SUG; 2; 8†	SUG; 3; 2	FUJ2; 1; 4	FUJ2; 2; 2	FUJ2; 3; 1	SUZ; 1; 1	**SUZ**; **2**; 2	2nd	280
2023	Bionic Jack Racing	**FUJ1**; **1**; 2	**FUJ1**; **2**; 2	**FUJ1**; **3**; 1	SUZ; 1; 2	**SUZ**; **2**; 1	**OKA**; **1**; 1	**OKA**; **2**; 2	**OKA**; **3**; 2	**MOT**; **1** Ret	**MOT**; **2**; 1	MOT; 3; 2	FUJ2; 1; 2	**FUJ2**; **2** Ret	SUG; 1; 3	SUG; 2; 4	SUG; 3; 4		1st	243.5

=== Complete Super Formula Lights results ===
(key) (Races in bold indicate pole position) (Races in italics indicate fastest lap)

Year	Entrant	1	2	3	4	5	6	7	8	9	10	11	12	13	14	15	16	17	18	Pos	Points
2023	Rn-sports	AUT; 1	AUT; 2	AUT; 3	SUG; 1	SUG; 2	SUG; 3	SUZ; 1	SUZ; 2	SUZ; 3	FUJ; 1	FUJ; 2	FUJ; 3	OKA; 1	OKA; 2	OKA; 3	MOT; 1; 9	MOT; 2; 7	MOT; 3; 9	11th	0

=== Complete Macau Grand Prix results ===
Year	Team	Car	Qualifying	Quali Race	Main race
2024	(Japan) TGM Grand Prix	Tatuus F3 T-318	19th	DNF	DNF
