= 2023 Formula Regional Japanese Championship =

Motor racing competition

The 2023 Formula Regional Japanese Championship was a multi-event, Formula Regional open-wheel single seater motor racing championship held in Japan. The drivers competed in Formula Regional cars that conformed to the FIA Formula Regional regulations for the championship. This was the fourth season of the series, promoted by New Pacific Sports Marketing Inc., and the 45th overall season of an FIA ladder series (dating to the 1979 Japanese Formula 3 Championship).

The season started on 1 April at Fuji Speedway and ran over six weekends until 26 November.

Sota Ogawa, driving for Bionic Jack Racing, won the Drivers' Championship, while Rn-Sports driver Yoshitsugu Kondo was victorious in the Masters' Class. Sutekina Racing Team won the Teams' Championship.

== Teams and drivers ==
All teams and drivers competed using the Dome F111/3 Regional F3 car. All teams were Japanese-registered.

Team	No.	Driver	Status	Rounds
(Japan) Team KRM	2	(Japan) Masahiro Hayashi	M	1
(Japan) Sutekina Racing Team	3	(Japan) Ryunosuke Sawa		1, 5
(Japan) Sutekina Racing Team	3	(New Zealand) Kaleb Ngatoa		2
(Japan) Sutekina Racing Team	3	(Japan) Yu Kanamaru		3
(Japan) Sutekina Racing Team	3	(Switzerland) Michael Sauter		4
(Japan) Sutekina Racing Team	3	(Japan) Jiei Okuzumi		6
(Japan) Sutekina Racing Team	14	(Japan) Mizuki Ishizaka		5
(Japan) Sutekina Racing Team	27	(New Zealand) Liam Sceats		All
(Japan) Rn-Sports	11	(Japan) "Motoki"	M	2, 5
(Japan) Rn-Sports	99	(Japan) Yoshitsugu Kondo	M	3–4, 6
(Japan) HELM Motorsports	14	(Japan) Tomohito Watabe		2
(Japan) HELM Motorsports	62	(Japan) Yuya Hiraki		1
(Japan) HELM Motorsports	62	(China) Wang Zhongwei		3
(Japan) Buzz Racing	14	(Japan) Jiei Okuzumi		3
(Japan) TOM'S Formula	14	(Italy) Enzo Trulli		4, 6
(Japan) NILZZ Racing	18	(Japan) "Yuki"	M	1, 4–5
(Japan) N-Speed	23	(Japan) "Yugo"	M	1, 5
(China) Sky Motor Sports	36	(China) Sky Chen	M	5–6
(Japan) Tokaidenso MD	44	(Japan) Toshihiro Kubota	M	5
(Japan) PONOS Racing	45	(Japan) Yorikatsu Tsujiko	M	1, 5
(Japan) PONOS Racing	45	(Japan) Kazuki Oki		2, 6
(Japan) Bionic Jack Racing	97	(Japan) Yugo Iwasawa		1–3
(Japan) Bionic Jack Racing	97	(Japan) Jiei Okuzumi		4
(Japan) Bionic Jack Racing	97	(Japan) Anna Inotsume		5
(Japan) Bionic Jack Racing	97	(Switzerland) Michael Sauter		6
(Japan) Bionic Jack Racing	98	(Japan) Sota Ogawa		All
Privateer	62	(Japan) Kizuku Hirota		6

Icon	Class
M	Masters' Cup.

== Race calendar ==
The 2023 calendar was revealed in late 2022.

Round		Circuit	Date	Support Bill	Map of circuit locations
1	R1	Fuji Speedway, Oyama	1 April	Fuji Champion Race Series; Porsche Sprint Challenge Japan; Yaris Cup West Japan Series; Formula Beat	2023 Formula Regional Japanese Championship is located in Japan
1	R2	Fuji Speedway, Oyama	2 April	Fuji Champion Race Series; Porsche Sprint Challenge Japan; Yaris Cup West Japan Series; Formula Beat	2023 Formula Regional Japanese Championship is located in Japan
1	R3	Fuji Speedway, Oyama	2 April	Fuji Champion Race Series; Porsche Sprint Challenge Japan; Yaris Cup West Japan Series; Formula Beat	2023 Formula Regional Japanese Championship is located in Japan
2	R4	Suzuka International Racing Course, Suzuka	14 May	TCR Japan Touring Car Series; Suzuka Clubman Race	2023 Formula Regional Japanese Championship is located in Japan
2	R5	Suzuka International Racing Course, Suzuka	14 May	TCR Japan Touring Car Series; Suzuka Clubman Race	2023 Formula Regional Japanese Championship is located in Japan
3	R6	Okayama International Circuit, Mimasaka	10 June	TCR Japan Touring Car Series; Okayama Challenge Cup; Formula Beat; Roadster Party Race	2023 Formula Regional Japanese Championship is located in Japan
3	R7	Okayama International Circuit, Mimasaka	11 June	TCR Japan Touring Car Series; Okayama Challenge Cup; Formula Beat; Roadster Party Race	2023 Formula Regional Japanese Championship is located in Japan
3	R8	Okayama International Circuit, Mimasaka	11 June	TCR Japan Touring Car Series; Okayama Challenge Cup; Formula Beat; Roadster Party Race	2023 Formula Regional Japanese Championship is located in Japan
4	R9	Mobility Resort Motegi, Motegi	22 July	GT World Challenge Asia (Japan Cup); GT4 Asia Series; Motegi Champion Cup; Super FJ	2023 Formula Regional Japanese Championship is located in Japan
4	R10	Mobility Resort Motegi, Motegi	23 July	GT World Challenge Asia (Japan Cup); GT4 Asia Series; Motegi Champion Cup; Super FJ	2023 Formula Regional Japanese Championship is located in Japan
4	R11	Mobility Resort Motegi, Motegi	23 July	GT World Challenge Asia (Japan Cup); GT4 Asia Series; Motegi Champion Cup; Super FJ	2023 Formula Regional Japanese Championship is located in Japan
5	R12	Fuji Speedway, Oyama	9 September	FIA World Endurance Championship (6 Hours of Fuji)	2023 Formula Regional Japanese Championship is located in Japan
5	R13	Fuji Speedway, Oyama	9 September	FIA World Endurance Championship (6 Hours of Fuji)	2023 Formula Regional Japanese Championship is located in Japan
6	R14	Sportsland Sugo, Murata	25 November	TCR Japan Touring Car Series; Sugo Champion Cup; Motegi - Sugo Challenge Cup; Japanese Roadster Cup	2023 Formula Regional Japanese Championship is located in Japan
6	R15	Sportsland Sugo, Murata	26 November	TCR Japan Touring Car Series; Sugo Champion Cup; Motegi - Sugo Challenge Cup; Japanese Roadster Cup	2023 Formula Regional Japanese Championship is located in Japan
6	R16	Sportsland Sugo, Murata	26 November	TCR Japan Touring Car Series; Sugo Champion Cup; Motegi - Sugo Challenge Cup; Japanese Roadster Cup	2023 Formula Regional Japanese Championship is located in Japan

== Race results ==
Round		Circuit	Pole position	Fastest lap	Winning driver	Winning team	Masters class winner
1	R1	Fuji Speedway	(Japan) Sota Ogawa	(Japan) Yuya Hiraki	(Japan) Yuya Hiraki	(Japan) HELM Motorsports	(Japan) Yorikatsu Tsukijo
1	R2	Fuji Speedway	(Japan) Sota Ogawa	(Japan) Ryunosuke Sawa	(Japan) Ryunosuke Sawa	(Japan) Sutekina Racing Team	(Japan) Yorikatsu Tsukijo
1	R3	Fuji Speedway	(Japan) Sota Ogawa	(Japan) Sota Ogawa	(Japan) Sota Ogawa	(Japan) Bionic Jack Racing	(Japan) "Yuki"
2	R4	Suzuka International Racing Course	(Japan) Kazuki Oki	(Japan) Yugo Iwasawa	(Japan) Kazuki Oki	(Japan) PONOS Racing	(Japan) ”Motoki”
2	R5	Suzuka International Racing Course	(Japan) Sota Ogawa	(New Zealand) Liam Sceats	(Japan) Sota Ogawa	(Japan) Bionic Jack Racing	(Japan) ”Motoki”
3	R6	Okayama International Circuit	(Japan) Sota Ogawa	(Japan) Jiei Okuzumi	(Japan) Sota Ogawa	(Japan) Bionic Jack Racing	(Japan) Yoshitsugu Kondo
3	R7	Okayama International Circuit	(Japan) Sota Ogawa	(Japan) Yu Kanamaru	(Japan) Yu Kanamaru	(Japan) Sutekina Racing Team	(Japan) Yoshitsugu Kondo
3	R8	Okayama International Circuit	(Japan) Sota Ogawa	(Japan) Sota Ogawa	(New Zealand) Liam Sceats	(Japan) Sutekina Racing Team	(Japan) Yoshitsugu Kondo
4	R9	Mobility Resort Motegi	(Japan) Sota Ogawa	(Japan) Sota Ogawa	(Japan) Jiei Okuzumi	(Japan) Bionic Jack Racing	(Japan) Yoshitsugu Kondo
4	R10	Mobility Resort Motegi	(Japan) Sota Ogawa	(Japan) Sota Ogawa	(Japan) Sota Ogawa	(Japan) Bionic Jack Racing	(Japan) Yoshitsugu Kondo
4	R11	Mobility Resort Motegi	(Japan) Sota Ogawa	(New Zealand) Liam Sceats	(New Zealand) Liam Sceats	(Japan) Sutekina Racing Team	(Japan) Yoshitsugu Kondo
5	R12	Fuji Speedway	(Japan) Ryunosuke Sawa	(Japan) Ryunosuke Sawa	(Japan) Ryunosuke Sawa	(Japan) Sutekina Racing Team	(Japan) Yorikatsu Tsukijo
5	R13	Fuji Speedway	(Japan) Sota Ogawa	(Japan) Ryunosuke Sawa	(New Zealand) Liam Sceats	(Japan) Sutekina Racing Team	(Japan) ”Motoki”
6	R14	Sportsland Sugo	(Italy) Enzo Trulli	(Switzerland) Michael Sauter	(Japan) Jiei Okuzumi	(Japan) Sutekina Racing Team	No classified finishers
6	R15	Sportsland Sugo	(Switzerland) Michael Sauter	(Japan) Sota Ogawa	(Japan) Jiei Okuzumi	(Japan) Sutekina Racing Team	No classified finishers
6	R16	Sportsland Sugo	(Switzerland) Michael Sauter	(Switzerland) Michael Sauter	(Switzerland) Michael Sauter	(Japan) Bionic Jack Racing	No classified finishers

== Season report ==
Nine cars entered the season opener at Fuji Speedway, where Bionic Jack's Sota Ogawa took pole positions for all three races. HELM's Yuya Hiraki started race one by taking the lead, and the pair fought all race long, with the latter coming out in front at the end. Sutekina's Ryunosuke Sawa stalled at the start, but managed to recover to third place. The second race saw Ogawa run off track at the start and rejoining fourth. Sawa benefitted to take the lead and the win. Ogawa was able to climb back to second place, with Hiraki completing the podium. The third race finally saw Ogawa able to convert a pole position into a win, as his teammate Yugo Iwasawa, who started alongside him, was unable to keep up. He fell back throughout the race, allowing Sawa and Hiraki onto the podium. Ogawa left Fuji with a three-point championship lead over Sawa.

The grid shrunk to seven cars at Suzuka Circuit as PONOS Racing's Kazuki Oki and Ogawa shared pole positions. The track was hit by a huge weather front for race day, causing torrential rains. The first race saw three laps of safety car conditions, before race control declared the conditions as too dangerous and waved the red flag. The race was not restarted, allowing Oki to take an uncontested win ahead of Ogawa and Sutekina's Liam Sceats. The second race later in the day was not much better: even through the race was started under green flag conditions, they only lasted for a single lap before Sutekina's Kaleb Ngatoa went off. The ensuing safety car turned into a red flag that ended the race, with Ogawa the one to take the win ahead of Sceats and Iwasawa. Both races were awarded half points, with Ogawa now 24.5 points ahead of the absent Sawa.

Round three at Okayama saw Ogawa sweep qualifying for all three races once again. After fending off Sceats at the start of race one, he was free to lead the whole race and take the win. Sceats was unable to muster an attack on the lead, before he dropped back behind Iwasawa and Sutekina's returning category veteran Yu Kanamaru. The second race saw Ogawa build a gap right from the start, but Kanamaru was the fastest car. The latter started fifth, but once he got into third, he caught the leaders by several seconds per lap. He passed his teammate Jiei Okuzumi on lap twelve and took the lead on lap 16 to win. Sceats overtook Ogawa at the start of the third race and held on to become the first foreign race winner in championship history and move into second in the standings, 56 points from Ogawa. Kanamaru ended his weekend with another podium.

The second half of the season began at Motegi, where Ogawa was once again unbeaten in qualifying. He gapped the field through the first half of race one, before making a mistake that saw him run into the gravel and retire. This promoted Okuzumi in the lead, and he won the race ahead of TOM'S's Formula Regional debutant Enzo Trulli and Sceats. Trulli put pressure on Ogawa all throughout the second race despite having a poor start. His efforts culminated in a photo-finish that saw Ogawa win by 0.010s, with Okuzumi further behind in third. The last race began with a five-car battle for the lead that saw Ogawa run into the gravel again. This time though, he was able to fight his way back into second, ahead of Trulli, while Sceats took the win. This saw Ogawa's lead being reduced for the first time of the season, with his advantage now at 47 points.

Eleven cars turned up when the series supported the 6 Hours of Fuji, and Sawa and Ogawa shared pole positions for the two races. As were both qualifying sessions, the first race was held on a wet track. Ogawa overtook Sawa for the lead at the start and continued in first place until he had to lap backmarker traffic through the second half. This brought Sawa back into contention, and as rain then started to fall, he got into the lead and won. Sutekina's Mizuki Ishizaka completed the rostrum. Race two saw the grid take on a foggy and rainy track. Both Ogawa and Sawa went off, with the former doing so two times and having to retire after his second mistake. This promoted Sceats to the front and allowed him to win ahead of Ishizaka and Sawa. Ogawa's championship lead was reduced once again and now stood at only 28 points.

The final round of the season at Sugo saw the grid reduced back to nine entries, with two of them unable to qualify. All three pole positions were earned by foreign drivers, with Trulli and Bionic Jack's Michael Sauter on top. The first race began with another bad start for Trulli that saw him drop behind Sauter. The latter then had to concede the lead to Okuzumi while the Italian crashed and retired. Sauter retook the lead from Okuzumi and came first, but a penalty dropped him to fourth, behind Sceats and Ogawa. Six cars started the second race that saw polesitter Sauter drop to fourth right at the start, before eventually having to retire. Okuzumi led Oki and Sceats home, with the latter keeping the championship open into the final race. That was won by Sauter, ahead of Okuzumi and Oki, while Ogawa came fourth ahead of Sceats to win the championship.

While Sauter, Trulli and Sceats became the first foreign drivers to contest multiple rounds in the history of the championship, the series still struggled heavily to attract competitive entries. Only two drivers contested the full season, and only six drivers entered more than two rounds. Ogawa became champion in his third year in the championship, by virtue of being the only driver with previous knowledge of both the car and the tracks that contested all rounds.

== Championship standings ==
=== Scoring system ===
Points were awarded to the top ten drivers.

Position	1st	2nd	3rd	4th	5th	6th	7th	8th	9th	10th
Points	25	18	15	12	10	8	6	4	2	1

=== Drivers' championship ===
Pos	Driver	FUJ1			SUZ (Note: Half points were awarded in both races of round two due to limited running caused by bad weather conditions.)		OKA			MOT			FUJ2		SUG			Pts
Pos	Driver	R1	R2	R3	R4	R5	R6	R7	R8	R9	R10	R11	R12	R13	R14	R15	R16	Pts
1	(Japan) Sota Ogawa	2	2	1	2	1	1	2	2	Ret	1	2	2	Ret	3	4	4	243.5
2	(New Zealand) Liam Sceats	4	Ret	5	3	2	4	4	1	3	4	1	4	1	2	3	5	219.5
3	(Japan) Jiei Okuzumi						Ret	3	4	1	3	5			1	1	2	145
4	(Japan) Ryunosuke Sawa	3	1	2									1	3				98
5	(Japan) Yugo Iwasawa	5	4	4	5	3	2	5	5									84.5
6	(Switzerland) Michael Sauter									4	5	4			4	Ret	1	71
7	(Japan) Kazuki Oki				1	4									5	2	3	61.5
8	(Japan) Yuya Hiraki	1	3	3														55
9	(Japan) Yu Kanamaru						3	1	3									55
10	(Italy) Enzo Trulli									2	2	3			Ret	DNS	Ret	51
11	(Japan) Yoshitsugu Kondo						5	6	7	5	6	6			DNQ	DNQ	DNQ	50
12	(Japan) "Yuki"	7	8	6						6	7	7	9	10				41
13	(Japan) Yorikatsu Tsujiko	6	5	7									6	9				34
14	(Japan) Mizuki Ishizaka												3	2				33
15	(Japan) Kizuku Hirota														6	5	6	26
16	(Japan) Anna Inotsume												5	4				22
17	(Japan) “Motoki”				7	5							8	5				22
18	(Japan) "Yugo"	8	6	8									11	8				20
19	(China) Wang Zhongwei						Ret	7	6									14
20	(Japan) Toshihiro Kubota												7	6				14
21	(Japan) Masahiro Hayashi	9†	7	9														10
22	(Japan) Tomohito Watabe				6	6												8
23	(China) Sky Chen												10	7	DNQ	DNQ	DNQ	7
24	(New Zealand) Kaleb Ngatoa				4	Ret												6
Pos	Driver	R1	R2	R3	R4	R5	R6	R7	R8	R9	R10	R11	R12	R13	R14	R15	R16	Pts
Pos	Driver	FUJ1			SUZ		OKA			MOT			FUJ2		SUG			Pts

=== Masters' class ===
Pos	Driver	FUJ1			SUZ		OKA			MOT			FUJ2		SUG			Pts
Pos	Driver	R1	R2	R3	R4	R5	R6	R7	R8	R9	R10	R11	R12	R13	R14	R15	R16	Pts
1	(Japan) Yoshitsugu Kondo						1	1	1	1	1	1			DNQ	DNQ	DNQ	150
2	(Japan) "Yuki"	2	4	1						2	2	2	4	6				129
3	(Japan) Yorikatsu Tsujiko	1	1	2									1	5				103
4	(Japan) "Yugo"	3	2	3									6	4				68
5	(Japan) “Motoki”				1	1							3	1				65
6	(Japan) Masahiro Hayashi	4†	3	4														39
7	(Japan) Toshihiro Kubota												2	2				36
8	(China) Sky Chen												5	3	DNQ	DNQ	DNQ	25
Pos	Driver	R1	R2	R3	R4	R5	R6	R7	R8	R9	R10	R11	R12	R13	R14	R15	R16	Pts
Pos	Driver	FUJ1			SUZ		OKA			MOT			FUJ2		SUG			Pts

=== Teams' championship ===
Only the best finishing driver of each team was eligible for teams' championship points.

Pos	Driver	FUJ1			SUZ		OKA			MOT			FUJ2		SUG			Pts
Pos	Driver	R1	R2	R3	R4	R5	R6	R7	R8	R9	R10	R11	R12	R13	R14	R15	R16	Pts
1	(Japan) Sutekina Racing Team	3	1	2	3	2	3	1	1	3	4	1	1	1	1	1	2	309.5
2	(Japan) Bionic Jack Racing	2	2	1	2	1	1	2	2	1	1	2	2	4	3	4	1	293.5
3	(Japan) PONOS Racing	6	5	7	1	4							6	9	5	2	3	95.5
4	(Japan) HELM Motorsports	1	3	3	6	6	Ret	7	6									77
5	(Japan) Rn-Sports				7	5	5	6	7	5	6	6	8	5	DNQ	DNQ	DNQ	72
6	(Japan) TOM'S Formula									2	2	3			Ret	DNS	Ret	51
7	(Japan) NILZZ Racing	7	8	6						6	7	7	9	10				41
8	(Japan) Buzz Racing						Ret	3	4									27
9	Privateer														6	5	6	26
10	(Japan) N-Speed	8	6	8									11	8				20
11	(Japan) Tokaidenso MD												7	6				14
12	(Japan) Team KRM	9†	7	9														10
13	(China) Sky Motor Sports												10	7	DNQ	DNQ	DNQ	7
Pos	Driver	R1	R2	R3	R4	R5	R6	R7	R8	R9	R10	R11	R12	R13	R14	R15	R16	Pts
Pos	Driver	FUJ1			SUZ		OKA			MOT			FUJ2		SUG			Pts
