= Carlsson (car company) =

German car tuning manufacturer

CARLSSON FAHRZEUGTECHNIK GMBH
- Company type: Public
- Industry: Automotive
- Founded: 1989
- Defunct: 2023
- Headquarters: Merzig, Germany
- Key people: Markus Schuster, Chief Technical Officer
- Products: Automobiles
- Website: www.carlsson.de

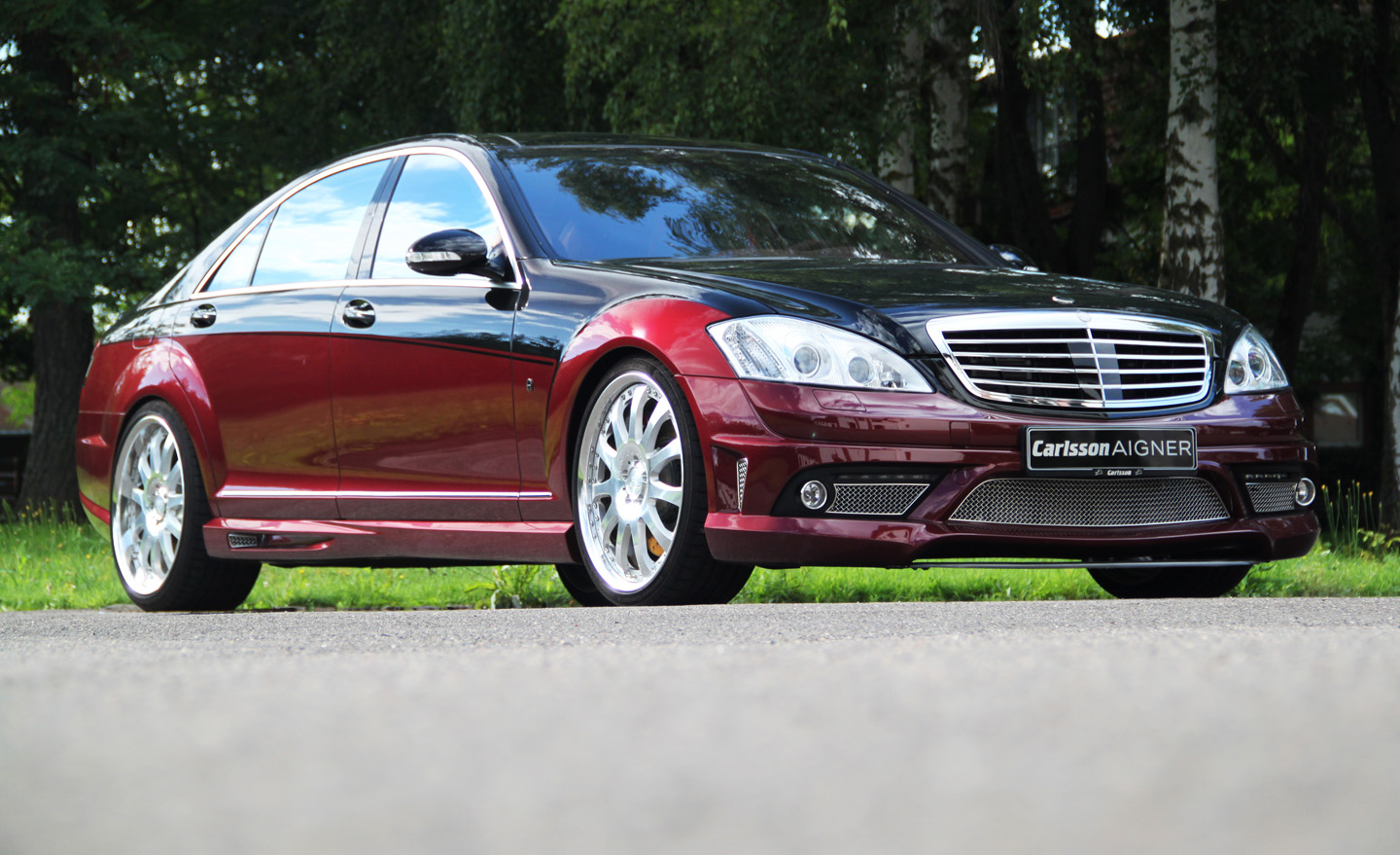
Carlsson Aigner CK65 RS Blanchimont

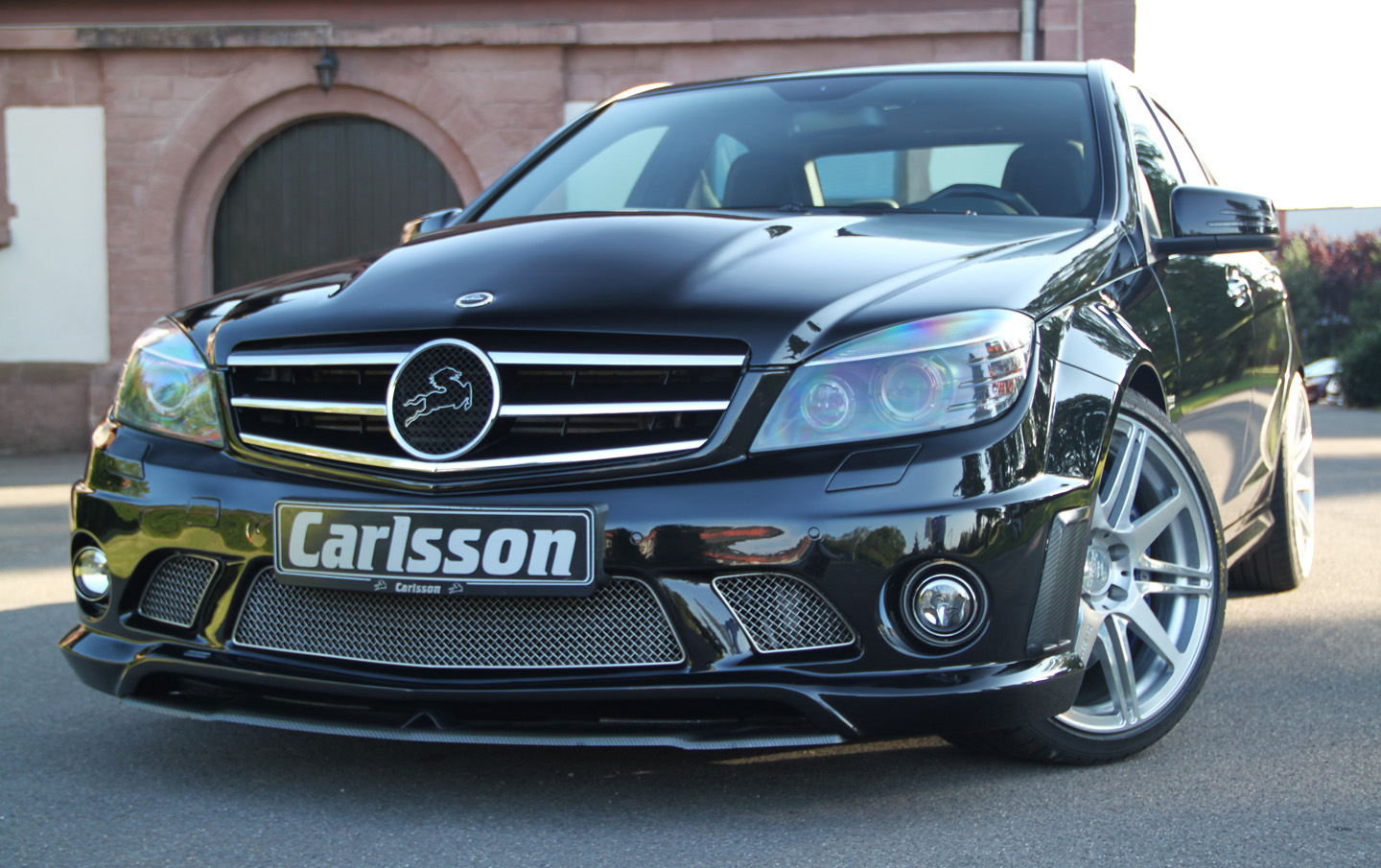
Carlsson CK63 RSR

Carlsson was a German car tuning manufacturer specialising in Mercedes-Benz cars. The Carlsson tuning house was founded by brothers Rolf and Andreas Hartge in 1989. Carlsson's products were available for the entire current range of Mercedes-Benz models including the R-Class, SL-Class, C-Class and the GL-Class along with many others. The company is most popular for its range of alloy wheels.

Through a new importer Carlsson began a more aggressive push into the US market in 2006 after debuting their newly modified CL500 (Euro-spec) vehicle at the 2006 SEMA Show. In their review, Modified Luxury & Exotics magazine said, "... the CL is starting to resemble something more in line with a Bentley Continental - even if it is a little shy when it comes to horsepower."

== History ==
The brothers, Rolf and Andreas Hartge, started a company in 1989 named Carlsson in honor of the Swedish rally driver, Ingvar Carlsson, who raced for the Mercedes Rally Team during the 1980s.

Carlsson also made cars based on Citroën, SAAB, Toyota, Lexus, Hyundai, and Genesis models.

In 2012, Zhongsheng Group Holdings Limited acquired 70% of the company's stake.

In 2015, Sambo Motors Co. Ltd., a Korean company, took over with effect from December 4.

== Cars ==
=== Carlsson CK35 RS Race Car ===
Based on a Mercedes SLK350 the CK35 RS race car debuted at the Nürburgring 24 hour race in 2005. The Carlsson Racer produces 320 hp (239 kW) at 6500 rpm and 295 ft⋅lbf (400 N⋅m) of torque at 3500 rpm. It can accelerate from 0 to 100 km/h (62 mph) in 4.8 seconds and reaches a top speed of 265 km/h (165 mph).

=== Carlsson C25 ===
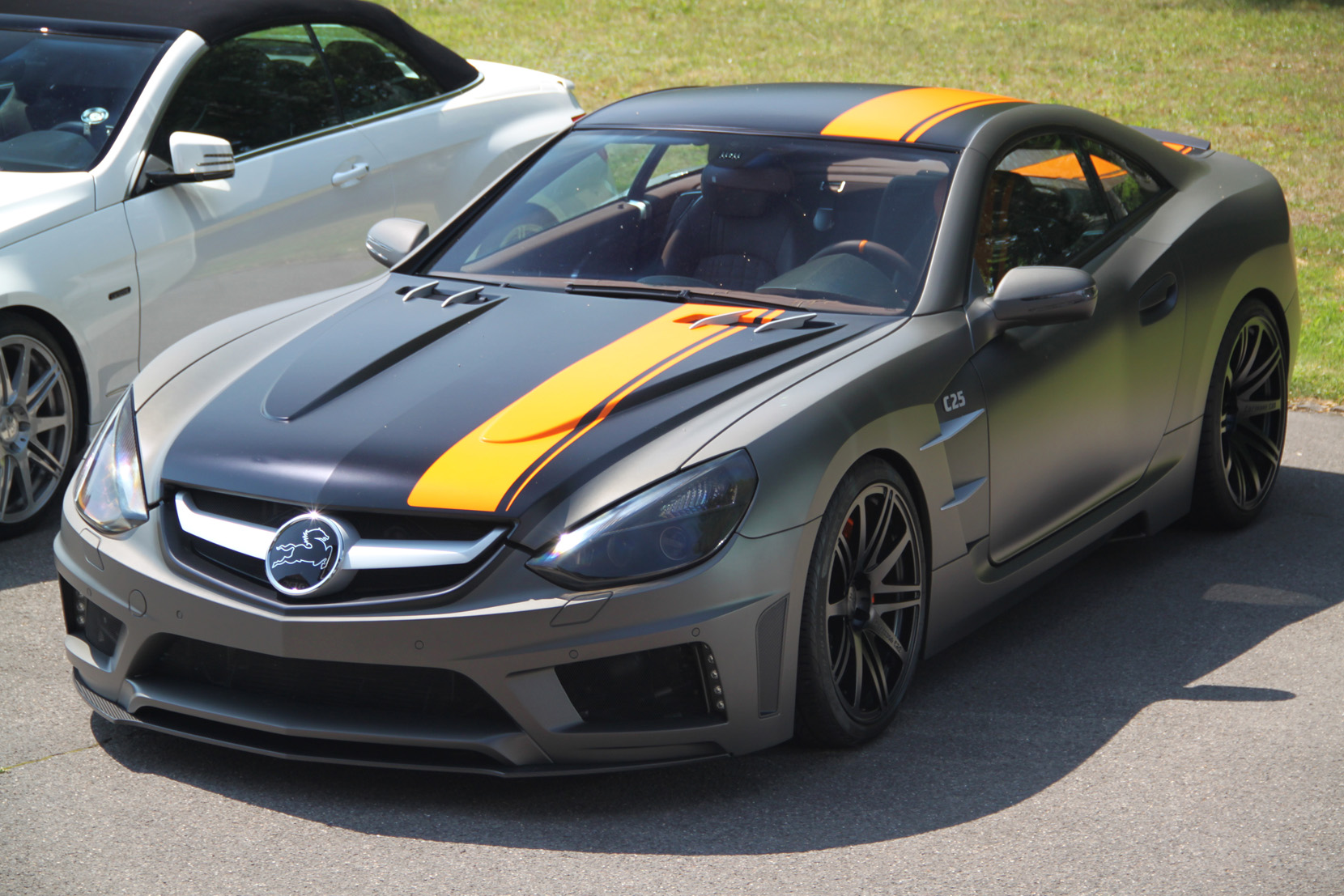
Carlsson C25

The C25, based on the Mercedes-Benz SL65 AMG, made its debut at the 2010 Geneva Motor Show. It's powered by a twin-turbocharged V12 engine that generates 753 hp (562 kW) and 848 ft⋅lbf (1,150 N⋅m) of torque, electronically limited from 995 ft⋅lbf (1,349 N⋅m) because of the transmission. It also features carbon fiber bodywork with a fixed roof, ditching the power folding hardtop from the SL, which Carlsson claims reduces the total weight by 220 lb (100 kg), for a curb weight of around 4,300 lb (1,950 kg). Estimated acceleration from 0–100 km/h (62 mph) is 3.7 seconds and the top speed is 219 mph. (355 km/h) Carlsson said they planned to produce a limited run of 25 units, each of which would go to a different country.

== Carlsson Coachbuilding ==
In 2007, Carlsson began a coachbuilding program with fashion house Etienne Aigner. The first example of their work together was a coachbuilt Mercedes CL65, titled the Carlsson Aigner CK65 RS "Eau Rouge." The "Eau Rouge" refers to the famous turn at the Belgian race track Spa Francorchamps. Producing 700 hp (520 kW) from Carlsson's engineers the car has a two-tone paint scheme and features a hand crafted wine-colored interior from Etienne Aigner.
