= Fuji 24 Hours =

24-hour annual endurance race

Super Taikyu Series
- Venue: Fuji Speedway
- Corporate sponsor: NAPAC (Nippon Auto Parts Aftermarket Committee)
- First race: 1967 (Original); 2018 (Current)
- First race: 2018
- Duration: 24 hours
- Most wins (driver): (Japan) Tatsuya Kataoka (4)
- Most wins (manufacturer): (Japan) Nissan & (Germany) Mercedes-AMG (5)

The Fuji 24 Hours Race - also known as the NAPAC Fuji 24 Hours Race for sponsorship reasons - is a 24-hour GT, touring car and production sports car endurance race held annually at Fuji Speedway in Oyama, Shizuoka Prefecture, Japan.

The race is sanctioned by the Japan Automobile Federation (JAF) and promoted by the Super Taikyu MIRAI Organization (STMO), and is the longest round of the Super Taikyu Series. Since its revival in 2018, the Fuji 24 Hours has traditionally been held late in the spring season, either in early June or late May.

== History ==
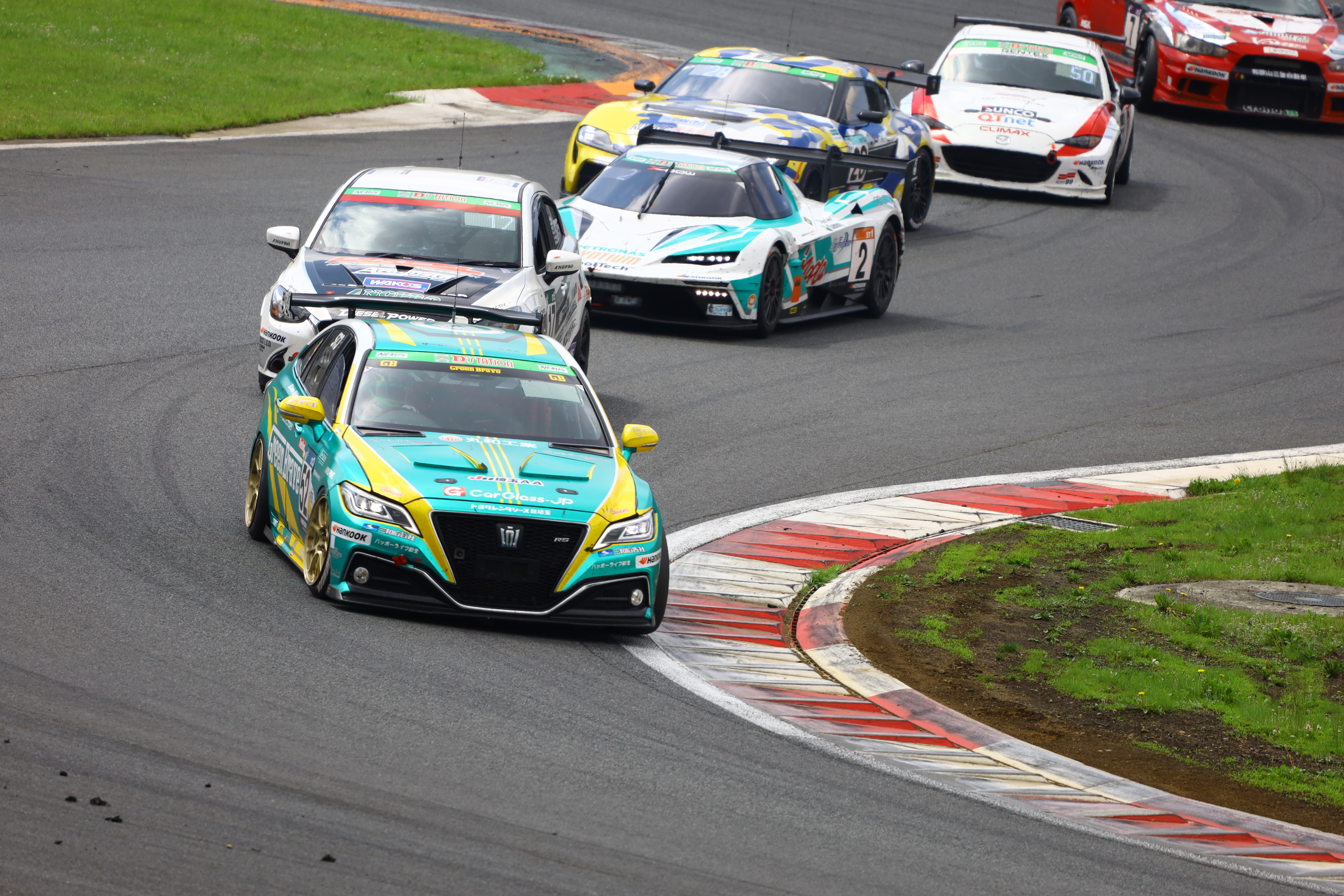
Multi-class racing during the 2021 Fuji 24 Hours.

The first 24-hour automobile endurance race in Japan was held at Fuji Speedway in April 1967, but the Fuji 24 Hours Race would only be held one more time in 1968 before the event was discontinued for several decades.

On 1 September 2017 - 50 years after the race was first held - Fuji Speedway announced the revival of the Fuji 24 Hours Race as a round of the Super Taikyu Series, beginning in 2018. This was the first 24-hour endurance race to be held in Japan since the Tokachi 24 Hours was last staged in 2008. The "Super TEC" event name (used until 2024) is a homage to the Fuji Inter TEC Race, which was held from 1985 to 1998 as part of the All-Japan Touring Car Championship.

Beginning in 2021, Super Taikyu introduced the ST-Q class for manufacturer-developed, non-homologated special vehicles. At that year's Fuji Super TEC 24 Hours Race, Toyota introduced a specially developed Toyota GR Corolla concept vehicle powered by a hydrogen internal combustion engine. The car successfully completed the 24-hour race. In 2023, the GR Corolla H2 Concept re-debuted at the Fuji 24 Hours Race after being converted from using gaseous hydrogen to liquid hydrogen and also completed the race.

Nissan introduced a new car for the 2022 race - the Nissan Z Racing Concept - which would serve as the prototype for the Nissan Z GT4 that launched in 2023.

== List of winners ==
Year	Drivers	Team	Car	Layout	Distance	Series
1967	(Japan) Shihomi Hosoya (Japan) Yoshio Otsubo	(Japan) Toyota Motor Sports Club (TMSC)	Toyota 2000GT	6 km	537 laps	
1968	(Japan) Tōru Itaya (Japan) Takatoshi Teranishi	(Japan) Sports Car Club of Nissan (SCCN)	Nissan Fairlady 2000	6 km	512 laps	
2018	(Japan) Teruhiko Hamano (Japan) Kazuki Hoshino (Japan) Kiyoto Fujinami (Japan) Hironobu Yasuda (China) Sun Zheng	(Japan) GTNET Motor Sports	Nissan GT-R NISMO GT3 (MY2015)	4.563 km	759 laps	Super Taikyu
2019	(Japan) Teruhiko Hamano (Japan) Kazuki Hoshino (Japan) Kiyoto Fujinami (Japan) Kazuki Hiramine	(Japan) GTNET Motor Sports	Nissan GT-R NISMO GT3 (MY2015)	4.563 km	801 laps	Super Taikyu
2020	(Japan) Daisuke Yamawaki (Japan) Shinichi Takagi (Hong Kong) Shaun Thong (Japan) Yuki Nemoto	(Japan) Mercedes-AMG Team Hirix Racing	Mercedes-AMG GT3 EVO	4.563 km	528 laps	Super Taikyu
2021	(Japan) Nobuyuki Oyagi (Japan) Takayuki Aoki (Japan) Kiyoto Fujinami (Japan) Natsu Sakaguchi	(Japan) GTNET Motor Sports	Nissan GT-R NISMO GT3 (MY2018)	4.563 km	763 laps	Super Taikyu
2022	(Japan) Yutaka Toriba (Japan) Yuya Hiraki (Japan) Reiji Hiraki (Hong Kong) Shaun Thong	(Japan) HELM Motorsports	Nissan GT-R NISMO GT3 (MY2018)	4.563 km	760 laps	Super Taikyu
2023	(Japan) Ryuta Ukai (Japan) Naoya Gamou (Japan) Hibiki Taira (Japan) Tatsuya Kataoka	(Japan) Zhongsheng Rookie Racing	Mercedes-AMG GT3 EVO	4.563 km	730 laps	Super Taikyu
2024	(Japan) Ryuta Ukai (France) Giuliano Alesi (Japan) Naoya Gamou (Japan) Tatsuya Kataoka	(Japan) Zhongsheng Rookie Racing	Mercedes-AMG GT3 EVO	4.563 km	773 laps	Super Taikyu
2025	(Japan) Tatsuya Kataoka (Japan) "Daisuke" (Japan) Yuya Motojima (Japan) Yuhki Nakayama (Japan) Shunji Okumoto	(Japan) TKRI	Mercedes-AMG GT3 EVO	4.563 km	572 laps	Super Taikyu
2026	(Japan) "Daisuke" (Japan) Tatsuya Kataoka (Japan) Yuhki Nakayama (Japan) Yuya Motojima	(Japan) TKRI	Mercedes-AMG GT3 EVO	4.563 km	793 laps	Super Taikyu

== Records ==
=== Multiple overall wins by driver ===
Wins	Driver	Years
4	(Japan) Tatsuya Kataoka	2023, 2024, 2025, 2026
3	(Japan) Kiyoto Fujinami	2018, 2019, 2021
2	(Japan) Teruhiko Hamano	2018, 2019
2	(Japan) Kazuki Hoshino	2018, 2019
2	(Hong Kong) Shaun Thong	2020, 2022
2	(Japan) Ryuta Ukai	2023, 2024
2	(Japan) Naoya Gamou	2023, 2024
2	(Japan) "Daisuke"	2025, 2026
2	(Japan) Yuhki Nakayama	2025, 2026
2	(Japan) Yuya Motojima	2025, 2026

=== Multiple overall wins by team ===
Wins	Team	Years
3	(Japan) GTNET Motor Sports	2018, 2019, 2021
2	(Japan) Zhongsheng Rookie Racing	2023, 2024
2	(Japan) TKRI	2025, 2026

=== Overall wins by manufacturer ===
Wins	Manufacturer	Years
5	(Japan) Nissan	1968, 2018, 2019, 2021, 2022
5	(Germany) Mercedes-AMG	2020, 2023, 2024, 2025, 2026
1	(Japan) Toyota	1967
