= Zhongsheng Group =

Chinese automotive retail and services company

Zhongsheng Group Holdings Limited
- Type: Public
- Traded as: SEHK: 881
- Industry: Automotive
- Founded: 1998; 28 years ago
- Founder: Huang Yi, Li Guoqiang
- Headquarters: Beijing, China
- Key people: Huang Yi (Chairman); Li Guoqiang (Vice-Chairman and CEO)

Zhongsheng Group Holdings Limited is a multinational automotive retail and services company headquartered in Beijing, China. It currently has around 140 dealerships across China and markets brands including Xpeng, Audi, Honda, Infiniti, Lexus, Mercedes-Benz, Nissan, Porsche, Toyota and Volvo.

Zhongsheng is listed on the Hong Kong Stock Exchange.

== History ==
Zhongsheng opened its first Toyota and Nissan dealerships in 1998. In 1999 Zhongsheng opened its first Audi dealership. Zhongsheng opened its first dealership in Shanghai in 2002. In 2005 Zhongsheng opened its first Lexus and Honda dealerships and its first dealership in Guangdong. Zhongsheng opened its first Mercedes-Benz dealership in 2009.

Zhongsheng listed on the Hong Kong Stock Exchange in March 2010. In December 2010 Zhongsheng agreed to acquire a 55 per cent stake in New Wing Enterprises, an operator of 15 4S car dealerships across China.

In May 2012 Zhongsheng acquired a 70 per cent stake in the German vehicle-personalization specialist Carlsson Autotechnik.
