= 2024 Toyota Gazoo Racing GR86/BRZ Cup =

Japanese motor racing season

The 2024 Bridgestone TOYOTA GAZOO Racing GR86/BRZ Cup was the twelfth running of the TGR GR86/BRZ Cup, a one-make motor racing championship for Toyota 86 and Subaru BRZ sports cars operated by Toyota Gazoo Racing. The championship featured a mix of Toyota factory drivers, independent professional drivers, and gentleman drivers, and commenced on 11 May at Sportsland SUGO before concluding on 24 November at Mobility Resort Motegi.

Tōgo Suganami dominated the season, taking a record-breaking six race victories, five pole positions, and seven podiums from the season's eight races to clinch his second championship title during the penultimate round at Suzuka. Defending champion Takuto Iguchi finished second, having scored less than half of Suganami's final points tally, with Iguchi and Takamitsu Matsui winning one race each.

== Teams and drivers ==
=== Professional Series ===
Manufacturer	Team	No.	Driver	Rounds
Subaru	Team Takuty	1	(Japan) Takuto Iguchi	All
Subaru	Team Takuty	87	(Japan) Rintarō Kubo	All
Subaru	ATRACT/K	62	(Japan) Kenji Nakahama	1, 3
Subaru	ATRACT/K	62	(Japan) Junpei Katoh	7
Subaru	Recaro Racing Team	906	(Japan) Kōta Sasaki	1, 4
Subaru	Recaro Racing Team	906	(Japan) Tsubasa Kondō	2–3, 5–7
Subaru	Recaro Racing Team	909	(Japan) Takashi Kogure	All
Toyota	KIMInternational	3	(Japan) Kengo Ichijou	1–4, 7
Toyota	Mansaku Jidousya	5	(Japan) Takashi Inoue	All
Toyota	T by Two CABANA Racing	7	(Japan) Yuui Tsutsumi	All
Toyota	T by Two CABANA Racing	700	(Japan) Hikaru Jitōsho	All
Toyota	GR Garage Urawamisono with GB	8	(Japan) Keiichi Watanabe	1, 3, 6–7
Toyota	GR Garage Urawamisono with GB	160	(Japan) Hiroki Yoshida	All
Toyota	OTG Motor Sports	10	(Japan) Tōgo Suganami	All
Toyota	OTG Motor Sports	60	(Japan) Ryo Ogawa	2–7
Toyota	OTG Motor Sports	70	(Japan) Naoki Hattori	All
Toyota	OTG Motor Sports	80	(Japan) Reimei Itō	1–4, 6–7
Toyota	Okabe Jidosha Motorsport	12	(Japan) Ai Miura	3
Toyota	Okabe Jidosha Motorsport	14	(Japan) Seiya Motojima	1, 3
Toyota	K-one Racing Team	17	(Japan) Nobuteru Taniguchi	All
Toyota	K-one Racing Team	85	(Japan) Shunji Okumoto	1–2, 4–7
Toyota	Ibaraki Toyopet Racing Team	18	(Japan) Yūichi Nakayama	All
Toyota	KM Racing	31	(Japan) Takayuki Aoki	All
Toyota	Team OTHR	32	(Japan) Tomoaki Ichimori	3, 5–6
Toyota	Ogura Clutch with Revolution	34	(Japan) Masahiro Sasaki	All
Toyota	COROLLA SHIN-IBARAKI CSIRacing	38	(Japan) Seita Nonaka	7
Toyota	Takashima Noboru	50	(Japan) Noboru Takashima	5
Toyota	Kamakura Yuuki	55	(Japan) Yūki Kamakura	3, 6
Toyota	Tochigi Toyota T2FACTORY	56	(Japan) Yoshiyuki Tsuruga	All
Toyota	4MINUTES Co., Ltd. R&D	72	(Japan) Natsu Sakaguchi	All
Toyota	Morikawa Motoo	76	(Japan) Motoo Morikawa	2–3, 5–6
Toyota	DTEC Team MASTER ONE	97	(Japan) Tomoki Takahashi	4–7
Toyota	DTEC Team MASTER ONE	98	(Japan) Yūya Motojima	All
Toyota	RSS	144	(Japan) Miki Onaga	2–5, 7
Toyota	Netz Hyōgo Racing Team	121	(Japan) Naoya Gamou	All
Toyota	Netz Tōyama Racing	123	(Japan) Takamitsu Matsui	1, 3, 5–7
Toyota	Nine with ARN RACING	199	(Japan) Kōki Saga	1–3
Toyota	Nine with ARN RACING	199	(Japan) Rikuto Kobayashi	6–7
Toyota	KTMS	225	(Japan) Hibiki Taira	1–2, 5–7
Toyota	KSM	293	(Japan) Daichi Okamoto	All
Toyota	HOJUST RACING	501	(Japan) Takeshi Suehiro	5
Toyota	Delta Motorsports	504	(Japan) Yūsuke Tomibayashi	All
Toyota	Team MEISHIN	550	(Japan) Shōtarō Munetou	All
Toyota	MAX ORIDO RACING	559	(Japan) Maaya Orido	3
Toyota	M Planning	910	(Japan) Hiroyuki Saka	1–3, 5–7
	Source:			

== Race calendar and results ==
All races were held in Japan. The provisional calendar was announced on 1 December 2023. All rounds were held alongside other national-level and local racing events; Rounds 1–4 and Round 7 were held alongside the TOYOTA GAZOO Racing Yaris Cup sister series. Round 1 at Sugo was also run in support of the TCR Japan Series and Formula Regional Japanese Championship, and Round 5 at Okayama was held alongside the fourth Super Formula Lights round.

Round	Circuit	Date	Pole position	Fastest lap	Winning driver	Winning team
1	(Miyagi Prefecture) Sportsland SUGO, Murata	12 May	(Japan) Yūsuke Tomibayashi	(Japan) Yuui Tsutsumi	(Japan) Takuto Iguchi	Team Takuty
2	(Ōita Prefecture) Autopolis, Hita	16 June	(Japan) Tōgo Suganami	(Japan) Tōgo Suganami	(Japan) Tōgo Suganami	OTG Motor Sports
3	(Shizuoka Prefecture) Fuji Speedway, Oyama	14 July	(Japan) Ryō Ogawa	(Japan) Takuto Iguchi	(Japan) Tōgo Suganami	OTG Motor Sports
3	(Shizuoka Prefecture) Fuji Speedway, Oyama	14 July	N/A (Note: The grid for the second race of the weekend was set according to the second-best time set by each driver during the qualifying session.)	(Japan) Takuto Iguchi	(Japan) Takamitsu Matsui	Netz Tōyama Racing
4	(Hokkaido) Tokachi International Speedway, Sarabetsu	25 August	(Japan) Tōgo Suganami	(Japan) Tōgo Suganami	(Japan) Tōgo Suganami	OTG Motor Sports
5	(Okayama Prefecture) Okayama International Circuit, Mimasaka	15 September	(Japan) Tōgo Suganami	(Japan) Hiroki Yoshida	(Japan) Tōgo Suganami	OTG Motor Sports
6	(Mie Prefecture) Suzuka International Racing Course, Suzuka	6 October	(Japan) Tōgo Suganami	(Japan) Tōgo Suganami	(Japan) Tōgo Suganami	OTG Motor Sports
7	(Tochigi Prefecture) Mobility Resort Motegi, Motegi	24 November	(Japan) Tōgo Suganami	(Japan) Yūichi Nakayama	(Japan) Tōgo Suganami	OTG Motor Sports

== Championship standings ==
=== Drivers' Championship ===
Points were awarded to the top ten classified finishers, with one point awarded for pole position and fastest lap respectively.

1	2	3	4	5	6	7	8	9	10	PP	FL
20	15	12	10	8	6	4	3	2	1	**1**	1

Pos.	Driver	SUG	AUT	FUJ		TOK	OKA	SUZ	MOT	Points
1	(Japan) Tōgo Suganami	2	**1**	1	11	**1**	**1**	**1**	**1**	143
2	(Japan) Takuto Iguchi	1	6	4	2	5	DNQ	31†	Ret	61
3	(Japan) Yūsuke Tomibayashi	**3**	8	3	25	8	4	30	2	56
4	(Japan) Yuui Tsutsumi	21	2	5	10	3	16	3	6	55
5	(Japan) Yūichi Nakayama	4	11	15	3	2	5	7	8	53
6	(Japan) Takamitsu Matsui	6		9	1		8	4	4	51
7	(Japan) Naoya Gamou	5	4	DNS	DNS	6	6	2	11	45
8	(Japan) Ryō Ogawa		5	**31**	6	4	9	9	5	37
9	(Japan) Hiroki Yoshida	8	13	6	5	13	2	15	10	34
10	(Japan) Reimei Itō	7	7	2	8	26		8	13	29
11	(Japan) Daichi Okamoto	9	9	8	12	7	17	5	20	19
12	(Japan) Naoki Hattori	23	10	12	4	10	7	13	9	18
13	(Japan) Tsubasa Kondō		3	7	14		14	16	12	16
14	(Japan) Takayuki Aoki	30†	16	11	21	9	31	14	3	14
15	(Japan) Shunji Okumoto	13	23			12	3	Ret	32	12
16	(Japan) Rintarō Kubo	11	Ret	10	19	19	11	6	7	11
17	(Japan) Hikaru Jitōsho	28	19	17	7	17	13	17	19	4
18	(Japan) Yūya Motojima	29	Ret	Ret	9	15	15	12	14	2
19	(Japan) Masahiro Sasaki	10	12	13	Ret	11	29	18	25	1
20	(Japan) Hibiki Taira	31†	DSQ				12	10	22	1
21	(Japan) Nobuteru Taniguchi	14	15	21	16	24	10	19	24	1
–	(Japan) Shōtarō Munetou	16	14	18	15	22	21	11	21	0
–	(Japan) Hiroyuki Saka	12	25	24	Ret		23	23	17	0
–	(Japan) Kengo Ichijou	15	26	14	13	Ret			29	0
–	(Japan) Kōta Sasaki	26				14				0
–	(Japan) Tomoki Takahashi					18	27	20	15	0
–	(Japan) Yoshiyuki Tsuruga	18	21	Ret	17	16	18	21	27	0
–	(Japan) Takashi Kogure	17	WD	16	Ret	25	22	25	18	0
–	(Japan) Rikuto Kobayashi							22	16	0
–	(Japan) Natsu Sakaguchi	25	17	Ret	Ret	23	30	26	30	0
–	(Japan) Takashi Inoue	19	18	29	24	20	25	24	28	0
–	(Japan) Tomoaki Ichimori			22	18		26	29		0
–	(Japan) Seiya Motojima	20		19	22					0
–	(Japan) Takeshi Suehiro						19			0
–	(Japan) Miki Onaga		22	20	23	21	20		26	0
–	(Japan) Kōki Saga	22	20	WD	WD					0
–	(Japan) Motoo Morikawa		24	23	20		24	28		0
–	(Japan) Seita Nonaka								23	0
–	(Japan) Kenji Nakahama	24		27	29					0
–	(Japan) Keiichi Watanabe	27		25	27			27	31	0
–	(Japan) Ai Miura			26	26					0
–	(Japan) Yūki Kamakura			28	28			DNS		0
–	(Japan) Noboru Takashima						28			0
–	(Japan) Maaya Orido			30	30					0
–	(Japan) Junpei Katoh								Ret	0
Pos.	Driver	SUG	AUT	FUJ		TOK	OKA	SUZ	MOT	Points

Key
Colour	Result
Gold	Race winner
Silver	2nd place
Bronze	3rd place
Green	Points finish
Blue	Non-points finish
Blue	Non-classified finish (NC)
Purple	Did not finish (Ret)
Black	Disqualified (DSQ)
Black	Excluded (EX)
White	Did not start (DNS)
White	Race cancelled (C)
White	Withdrew (WD)
Blank	Did not participate

**Bold** – Pole
Italics – Fastest Lap
