= Eijiro Shimizu =

Japanese racing driver

- Nationality: (Japan) Japanese
- Born: 15 March 2003 (age 23) Hyogo, Japan

Super GT Series - GT300 career
- Debut season: 2022
- Current team: SHADE Racing
- Car number: 20
- Starts: 24
- Wins: 0
- Podiums: 1
- Poles: 1
- Best finish: 16th in 2023

Previous series
- 2020-2021: F4 Japanese Championship

Eijiro Shimizu (清水 英志郎, Shimizu Eijirou; born 15 March 2003) is a Japanese racing driver who most recently competed in Super GT for SHADE Racing.

== Career ==
=== Formula 4 ===
Shimizu made his Formula 4 debut in 2020, driving for Toyota's TGR-DC Racing School alongside Hibiki Taira, Seita Nonaka, and Jiei Okuzumi. In 2021, he stayed again with the team as he finished eighth in the standings.

=== Super GT ===
Shimizu joined Super GT in 2022 with new team SHADE Racing, he was joined by veteran Katsuyuki Hiranaka. For 2023, Shimizu stayed with Hiranaka, as both clinched their maiden podium at Sugo, with second place.

== Racing record ==
=== Career summary ===
Season	Series	Team	Races	Wins	Poles	FLaps	Podiums	Points	Position
2020	F4 Japanese Championship	TGR-DC Racing School	12	0	0	0	0	5	17th
2021	F4 Japanese Championship	TGR-DC Racing School	14	0	0	1	1	68	8th
2021	Super Taikyu - ST-4	Hayashi Telempu SHADE Racing	5	2	0	0	6	130‡	**1st‡**
2022	Super GT - GT300	SHADE Racing	8	0	0	0	0	6	27th
2022	Super Taikyū - ST-Z	SHADE Racing	7	2	1	3	4	115.5	**2nd‡**
2023	Super GT - GT300	SHADE Racing	8	0	0	0	1	16	16th
2023	Super Taikyū - ST-Z	SHADE Racing	7	2	1	1	6	141.5	**2nd‡**
2024	Super GT - GT300	SHADE Racing	8	0	1	0	0	2	19th
2024	Super Taikyū - ST-Z	SHADE Racing	6	1	0	0	0	82.5‡	**2nd‡**
2025	Super GT - GT300	SHADE Racing	6	0	2	0	0	0	NC
2025	Super Taikyu - ST-4	SHADE Racing	6	3	4	0	4	133.5‡	**1st‡**
2025	TGR GR86/BRZ Cup	K-one Racing Team	7	0	0	0	1	31	6th
2026	Super GT - GT300	SHADE Racing							
2026	Super Taikyu - ST-4	SHADE Racing							
2026	TGR GR86/BRZ Cup	K-one Racing Team							

‡ Team standings

=== Complete F4 Japanese Championship results ===
(key) (Races in bold indicate pole position; races in italics indicate points for the fastest lap of top ten finishers)

Year	Team	1	2	3	4	5	6	7	8	9	10	11	12	13	14	DC	Points
2020	TGR-DC Racing School	FUJ1; 1; 10	FUJ1; 2; 9	FUJ1; 3; 10	SUZ; 1 Ret	SUZ; 2; 13	SUZ; 3; 15	MOT; 1; 10	MOT; 2; 11	MOT; 3; 14	FUJ2; 1 Ret	FUJ2; 2 DNS	FUJ2; 3; 17			17th	5
2021	TGR-DC Racing School	FUJ1; 1; 5	FUJ1; 2; 3	SUZ; 1; 4	SUZ; 2; 19	MOT1; 1; 6	MOT1; 2; 10	MOT1; 3; 4	SUG; 1; 10	SUG; 2; 10	SUG; 3; 10	MOT2; 1 Ret	MOT2; 2; 10	FUJ2; 1; 7	FUJ2; 2; 26	8th	68

=== Complete Super GT results ===
(key) (Races in bold indicate pole position) (Races in italics indicate fastest lap)

Year	Team	Car	Class	1	2	3	4	5	6	7	8	9	DC	Pts
2022	SHADE Racing	Toyota GR86 GT300	GT300	OKA; 14	FUJ; 20	SUZ; DNS	FUJ; Ret	SUZ; 7	SUG; 23	AUT; 9	MOT; 21		27th	6
2023	SHADE Racing	Toyota GR86 GT300	GT300	OKA; Ret	FUJ; 12	SUZ; 10	FUJ; 15	SUZ; 18	SUG; 2	AUT; 13	MOT; 14		16th	16
2024	SHADE Racing	Toyota GR86 GT300	GT300	OKA; 13	FUJ; 19	SUZ; 15	FUJ; 19	**SUG**; **Ret**	AUT; 9	MOT; 16	SUZ; 19		19th	2
2025	SHADE Racing	Toyota GR86 GT300	GT300	OKA; Ret	FUJ; 17	SEP	FS1; 16	FS2 (21)	SUZ; DNS	SUG; Ret	AUT	MOT; 25	NC	0
2026	SHADE Racing	Lexus RC F GT3	GT300	OKA	FUJ	SEP	FUJ	SUZ	SUG	AUT	MOT			
