= Togo Suganami =

Japanese racing driver

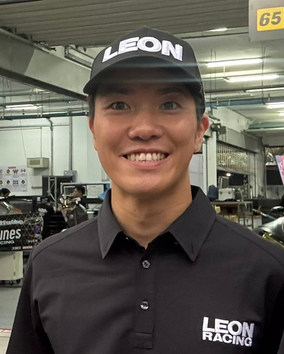
- Suganami at the 2025 Super GT Malaysia Festival
- Nationality: (Japan) Japanese
- Born: 2 November 1995 (age 31) Hyogo, Japan

Super GT - GT300 career
- Debut season: 2019
- Current team: LEON Racing
- Car number: 65
- Former teams: Saitama Toyopet Green Brave, Hoppy Team Tsuchiya
- Starts: 24
- Wins: 2
- Podiums: 6
- Poles: 1
- Fastest laps: 1
- Best finish: 1st in 2025

Previous series
- 2022-24 2017-18: Super Formula Lights; F4 Japanese Championship

Championship titles
- 2025: Super GT - GT300

Togo Suganami (菅波 冬悟, Suganami Tōgo; born 2 November 1995) is a racing driver from Japan who currently competes in Super GT for K2 R&D LEON Racing.

Suganami won the 2025 Super GT championship, in the GT300 class.

== Career ==
=== Formula career ===
Suganami started his first Formula racing in 2017 in F4 Japanese Championship until 2018 season, which was his highest standing in fifth with two wins and three podiums. In 2022, Suganami returned to formula racing at Super Formula Lights with B-Max Racing with Iori Kimura as his teammate. He returnd to the series for couple of rounds with the same team, where he replaced Nobuhiro Imada, and Takashi Hata for each round respectively. He claimed his first win at Suzuka Circuit, and two podiums on that round.

=== Super GT ===
Suganami made his Super GT GT300 debut on 2019 for K2 R&D LEON Racing, replaces Haruki Kurosawa for the last three rounds of the series. Suganami claimed his maiden podium in the last round at Motegi where he reach second place alongside Naoya Gamou. Suganami retained for next season with Gamou. That season he got a win and two podiums, where both him, and Gamou clinched third place in the standings. Suganami continued for next season where he claimed two podiums, but only managed to get sixth place in the standings where that would be his last race with Leon Racing. Suganami returned to the series for 2022 for one round to replace Hiroki Yoshida for one round at Fuji Speedway. Suganami moved to Team Tsuchiya for 2023, partnered up with regular from last season Seita Nonaka. Unfortunately, Team Tsuchiya could not continue for the rest of the season after the car caught up with fire where the car could not be repaired to return for the season.

=== Super Formula Lights ===
Suganami returned to formula racing in 2022 to race in Super Formula Lights as he joins B-Max Racing Team. Suganami then rejoined the team in 2023, but only race for three races in total to replace Nobuhiro Imada for one round and Takashi Hata for two rounds. Suganami managed to get two wins and four podiums, where he managed to get sixth as he beat Seita Nonaka, Yuga Furutani and David Vidales. Suganami once again made an appearance in 2024, as he replaced Imada for the last round.

== Racing record ==
=== Career summary ===
Season	Series	Team	Races	Wins	Poles	FLaps	Podiums	Points	Position
2017	F4 Japanese Championship	OTG Motor Sports	14	0	0	1	0	8	15th
2018	F4 Japanese Championship	OTG Motor Sports	14	2	2	3	3	119	5th
2019	Super GT - GT300	K2 R&D LEON Racing	3	0	0	0	1	27	11th
2019	F4 Japanese Championship	OTG Motor Sports	14	0	0	0	4	128	5th
2019	Super Taikyu - ST-4	Endless Sports	1	0	0	1	1	89‡	4th‡
2020	Super GT - GT300	K2 R&D LEON Racing	8	1	1	0	2	59	**3rd**
2020	Super Taikyu - ST-4	Endless Sports	1	0	0	0	1	74‡	4th‡
2021	Super GT - GT300	K2 R&D LEON Racing	8	0	0	0	2	43	6th
2021	Super Taikyu - ST-Z	Endless Sports	6	1	0	0	4	106‡	**1st‡**
2022	Super Formula Lights	B-Max Racing Team	18	0	0	0	1	25	7th
2022	Super GT - GT300	Saitama Toyopet GreenBrave	1	0	0	0	0	1	33rd
2022	Super Taikyu - ST-Q	Endless Sports							
2023	Super Formula Lights	B-Max Racing Team	9	2	0	1	4	39	6th
2023	Super GT - GT300	Hoppy Team Tsuchiya	4	0	0	0	0	1	25th
2023	Super Taikyu - ST-4	Endless Sports	5	1	2	0	2	69‡	6th‡
2023	TGR GR86/BRZ Cup	OTG Motor Sports	7	1	2	0	2	53	**3rd**
2024	Super GT - GT300	Hoppy Team Tsuchiya	8	0	0	0	0	0	NC
2024	Super Formula Lights	JMS Racing Team	3	0	0	0	0	0	13th
2024	Super Taikyu - ST-4	Endless Sports							
2024	TGR GR86/BRZ Cup	OTG Motor Sports	8	6	5	3	7	143	**1st**
2025	Super GT - GT300	K2 R&D LEON Racing	8	1	0	1	2	86	**1st**
2025	Super Taikyu - ST-4	Endless Sports							
2025	TGR GR86/BRZ Cup	OTG Motor Sports	7	2	2	2	2	57	4th
2026	Super Taikyu - ST-4	Endless Sports							
2026	Super GT - GT300	K2 R&D LEON Racing							
2026	TGR GR86/BRZ Cup	OTG Motor Sports							

‡ Team standings

=== Complete F4 Japanese Championship results ===
(key) (Races in bold indicate pole position) (Races in italics indicate fastest lap)

Year	Team	1	2	3	4	5	6	7	8	9	10	11	12	13	14	DC	Pts
2017	OTG Motor Sports	OKA; 1; 9	OKA; 2; 10	FUJ1; 1; 9	FUJ1; 2; 11	AUT; 1 DNS	AUT; 2; 15	SUG; 1; 14	SUG; 2; 9	FUJ2; 1; 11	FUJ2; 2; 10	SUZ; 1; 19	SUZ; 2; 25	MOT; 1; 17	MOT; 2; 29	15th	8
2018	OTG Motor Sports	OKA; 1; 10	OKA; 2; 10	FUJ1; 1 Ret	FUJ1; 2; 3	SUZ; 1; 8	SUZ; 2 Ret	FUJ2; 1; 6	FUJ2; 2; 4	SUG; 1; 9	SUG; 2; 9	**AUT**; **1**; **1**	**AUT**; **2**; **1**	MOT; 1; 4	MOT; 2; 4	5th	119
2019	OTG Motor Sports	OKA; 1; 3	OKA; 2; 2	FUJ1; 1; 8	FUJ1; 2; 6	SUZ; 1; 4	SUZ; 2; 4	FUJ2; 1; 2	FUJ2; 2; 3	AUT; 1; 7	AUT; 2; 7	SUG; 1; 6	SUG; 2; 7	MOT; 1 Ret	MOT; 2 Ret	5th	128

=== Complete Super GT results ===
Year	Team	Car	Class	1	2	3	4	5	6	7	8	9	DC	Points
2019	K2 R&D LEON Racing	Mercedes-AMG GT3	GT300	OKA	FUJ	SUZ	CHA	FUJ	AUT; 7	SUG; 4	MOT; 2		11th	27
2020	K2 R&D LEON Racing	Mercedes-AMG GT3	GT300	FUJ; 6	FUJ; 4	SUZ; 6	MOT; 1	FUJ; 3	SUZ; 10	MOT; 19	FUJ; 4		**3rd**	**59**
2021	K2 R&D LEON Racing	Mercedes-AMG GT3	GT300	OKA; 2	FUJ; 4	SUZ; 9	MOT; 15	SUG; 14	AUT; 8	MOT; Ret	FUJ; 2		6th	43
2022	Saitama Toyopet Green Brave	Toyota GR Supra GT300	GT300	OKA	FUJ; 9	SUZ	FUJ	SUZ	SUG	AUT	MOT		33rd	1
2023	Hoppy Team Tsuchiya	Toyota GR Supra GT300	GT300	OKA; 12	FUJ; 10	SUZ; 17	FUJ; Ret	SUZ	SUG	AUT	MOT		25th	1
2024	Hoppy Team Tsuchiya	Toyota GR Supra GT300	GT300	OKA; 14	FUJ; 23	SUZ; 18	FUJ; Ret	SUG	AUT; 11	MOT; Ret	SUZ; 15		NC	0
2025	K2 R&D LEON Racing	Mercedes-AMG GT3 Evo	GT300	OKA; 1	FUJ; 5	SEP; 7	FS1; 3	FS2 (3)	SUZ; 13	SUG; 11	AUT; 6	MOT; 6	1st	86
2026	K2 R&D LEON Racing	Mercedes-AMG GT3 Evo	GT300	OKA; 5	FUJ; 2	FUJ; 10	SUZ; 17	SUG; 16	AUT; 3	MOT; 13	MOT; 7		5th	65

=== Complete Super Formula Lights results ===
(key) (Races in bold indicate pole position) (Races in italics indicate fastest lap)

Year	Entrant	1	2	3	4	5	6	7	8	9	10	11	12	13	14	15	16	17	18	Pos	Points
2022	B-Max Racing Team	FUJ; 1; 5	FUJ; 2; 9	FUJ; 3; 5	SUZ; 1; 6	SUZ; 2; 6	SUZ; 3; 4	AUT; 1; 5	AUT; 2; 10	AUT; 3; 4	SUG; 1 Ret	SUG; 2; 7	SUG; 3; 8	MOT; 1; 7	MOT; 2; 3	MOT; 3; 6	OKA; 1; 5	OKA; 2; 4	OKA; 3; 8	7th	25
2023	B-Max Racing Team	AUT; 1	AUT; 2	AUT; 3	SUG; 1	SUG; 2	SUG; 3	SUZ; 1; 1	SUZ; 2; 8	SUZ; 3; 2	FUJ; 1; 5	FUJ; 2; 7	FUJ; 3; 5	OKA; 1	OKA; 2	OKA; 3	MOT; 1; 2	MOT; 2; 11	MOT; 3; 1	6th	39
2024	JMS Racing Team	AUT; 1	AUT; 2	AUT; 3	SUG; 1	SUG; 2	SUG; 3	FUJ; 1	FUJ; 2	FUJ; 3	OKA; 1	OKA; 2	OKA; 3	SUZ; 1	SUZ; 2	SUZ; 3	MOT; 1; 9	MOT; 2; 9	MOT; 3; 8	13th	0
