= 2025 Toyota Gazoo Racing GR86/BRZ Cup =

Japanese motor racing season

The 2025 TOYOTA GAZOO Racing GR86/BRZ Cup was the thirteenth running of the TGR GR86/BRZ Cup, a one-make motor racing championship for Toyota GR86 and Subaru BRZ sports cars operated by Toyota Gazoo Racing. The championship features a mix of Toyota factory drivers, independent professional drivers, and gentleman drivers, and commenced on 6 April at Autopolis before concluding on 30 November at Okayama International Circuit.

Yuui Tsutsumi won his first driver's championship in the series after eight consecutive seasons, clinching the title at the final round over 2023 series champion Takuto Iguchi. In the Clubman Series, Malaysian Naquib Nor Azlan dominated the championship, winning four out of the six races he contested to become the series' first non-Japanese champion.

== Teams and drivers ==
=== Professional Series ===
Manufacturer	Team	No.	Driver	Rounds
Toyota	OTG Motor Sports	1	(Japan) Tōgo Suganami	All
Toyota	OTG Motor Sports	34	(Japan) Masahiro Sasaki	All
Toyota	OTG Motor Sports	60	(Japan) Ryō Ogawa	All
Toyota	OTG Motor Sports	70	(Japan) Naoki Hattori	All
Toyota	OTG Motor Sports	90	(Japan) Miki Onaga	All
Toyota	K-one Racing Team	2	(Japan) Eijirō Shimizu	All
Toyota	K-one Racing Team	17	(Japan) Nobuteru Taniguchi	All
Toyota	Mansaku Jidousya	5	(Japan) Takashi Inoue	All
Toyota	T by Two CABANA Racing	7	(Japan) Yuui Tsutsumi	All
Toyota	GR Garage Urawamisono with GB	8	(Japan) Keiichi Watanabe	2–3, 5–6
Toyota	GR Garage Urawamisono with GB	160	(Japan) Hiroki Yoshida	All
Toyota	AlphaRex Racing	11	(Hong Kong) Adrian Chung Kwok Hei	1–2
Toyota	Kobanyanneru	12	(Japan) Hikaru Jitōsho	5–7
Toyota	Ibaraki Toyopet Racing Team	18	(Japan) Yūichi Nakayama	1, 5–7
Toyota	KMS Racing	31	(Japan) Takayuki Aoki	All
Toyota	Team OTHR	32	(Japan) Tomoaki Ichimori	5, 7
Toyota	Takashima Noboru	50	(Japan) Noboru Takashima	6–7
Toyota	Tochigi Toyota T2 FACTORY	56	(Japan) Yoshiyuki Tsuruga	2–3, 5–7
Toyota	Morikawa Motoo	76	(Japan) Motoo Morikawa	1, 3, 5–7
Toyota	DTEC Team MASTER ONE	97	(Japan) Tomoki Takahashi	All
Toyota	DTEC Team MASTER ONE	98	(Japan) Yūya Motojima	1–3, 5–7
Toyota	DTEC Team MASTER ONE	98	(Japan) Kengo Ichijō	4
Toyota	Netz Hyōgo Racing Team	121	(Japan) Naoya Gamou	1–3, 5–7
Toyota	NETZ TOYAMA Racing	123	(Japan) Takamitsu Matsui	All
Toyota	Netz Chiba Sport Racing	141	(Japan) Kazuhito Ishii	2, 5
Toyota	AVANTECH Racing Team	186	(Japan) Ryōto Satō	1–3, 5–7
Toyota	Nine with ARN RACING	199	(Japan) Rikuto Kobayashi	1–3, 6
Toyota	KSM	293	(Japan) Daichi Okamoto	All
Toyota	Okinawa Dream Racing	330	(Japan) Hibiki Taira	All
Toyota	Delta Motorsports	504	(Japan) Yūsuke Tomibayashi	All
Toyota	Team MEISHIN	550	(Japan) Shōtarō Munetou	All
Toyota	M Planning	910	(Japan) Hiroyuki Saka	1–3, 5–7
Subaru	Team Takuty	87	(Japan) Rintarō Kubo	1, 3–7
Subaru	Team Takuty	87	(Japan) Takurō Shinohara	2
Subaru	Team Takuty	88	(Japan) Takuto Iguchi	All
Subaru	Team Takuty	89	(Japan) Shunji Okumoto	2–7
Subaru	Recaro Racing Team	903	(Japan) Kōta Sasaki	6
Subaru	Recaro Racing Team	906	(Japan) Tsubasa Kondō	1–2, 6
Subaru	Recaro Racing Team	909	(Japan) Takashi Kogure	1–2, 4, 6–7
	Source:			

== Race calendar and results ==
All races were held in Japan. The provisional calendar was announced on 25 December 2024. All rounds were held alongside other national-level and local racing events; all rounds excluding Rounds 5 and 6 were run alongside were held alongside the regional TOYOTA GAZOO Racing Yaris Cup sister series. Round 3 at Sugo was also run in support of the SRO Japan Cup GT series, and Round 5 at Fuji was held alongside the fifth Super Formula Lights round.

Round	Circuit	Date	Pole position	Fastest lap	Winning driver	Winning team
1	(Ōita Prefecture) Autopolis, Hita	6 April	(Japan) Yuui Tsutsumi	(Japan) Tōgo Suganami	(Japan) Tōgo Suganami	OTG Motor Sports
2	(Tochigi Prefecture) Mobility Resort Motegi, Motegi	25 May	(Japan) Yūsuke Tomibayashi	(Japan) Shunji Okumoto	(Japan) Yūsuke Tomibayashi	Delta Motorsports
3	(Miyagi Prefecture) Sportsland SUGO, Murata	15 June	(Japan) Yuui Tsutsumi	(Japan) Daichi Okamoto	(Japan) Yuui Tsutsumi	T by Two CABANA Racing
4	(Hokkaido) Tokachi International Speedway, Sarabetsu	13 July	(Japan) Tomoki Takahashi	(Japan) Takuto Iguchi	(Japan) Tomoki Takahashi	DTEC Team MASTER ONE
5	(Shizuoka Prefecture) Fuji Speedway, Oyama	7 September	(Japan) Tōgo Suganami	(Japan) Yuui Tsutsumi	(Japan) Daichi Okamoto	KSM
6	(Mie Prefecture) Suzuka International Racing Course, Suzuka	5 October	(Japan) Naoya Gamou	(Japan) Tsubasa Kondō	(Japan) Naoya Gamou	Netz Hyōgo Racing Team
7	(Okayama Prefecture) Okayama International Circuit, Mimasaka	30 November	(Japan) Tōgo Suganami	(Japan) Tōgo Suganami	(Japan) Tōgo Suganami	OTG Motor Sports

== Championship standings ==
=== Drivers' Championship ===
Points were awarded to the top ten classified finishers, with one point awarded for pole position and fastest lap respectively.

1	2	3	4	5	6	7	8	9	10	PP	FL
20	15	12	10	8	6	4	3	2	1	**1**	1

Pos.	Driver	AUT	MOT	SUG	TOK	FSW	SUZ	OKA	Points
1	(Japan) Yuui Tsutsumi	**2**	3	**1**	2	17	2	5	88
2	(Japan) Takuto Iguchi	5	2	3	4	3	3	4	80
3	(Japan) Daichi Okamoto	3	6	5	10	1	4	18	58
4	(Japan) Tōgo Suganami	1	4	13	8	**Ret**	16	**1**	57
5	(Japan) Naoya Gamou	22	15	2		Ret	**1**	3	48
6	(Japan) Eijirō Shimizu	12	13	19	6	4	23	2	31
7	(Japan) Yūsuke Tomibayashi	7	**1**	9	Ret	12	11	9	29
8	(Japan) Tomoki Takahashi	20	16	17	**1**	13	22	7	25
9	(Japan) Takayuki Aoki	14	10	18	5	2	14	Ret	24
10	(Japan) Hiroki Yoshida	18	WD	8	3	25	7	12	19
11	(Japan) Rintarō Kubo	6		7	16	8	8	8	19
12	(Japan) Yūichi Nakayama	4				6	9	23	18
13	(Japan) Yūya Motojima	9	5	Ret		11	5	16	18
14	(Japan) Ryō Ogawa	8	8	26	20	5	24	10	15
15	(Japan) Ryōto Satō	21	18	4		28	12	14	10
16	(Japan) Masahiro Sasaki	13	12	15	12	7	6	15	10
17	(Japan) Rikuto Kobayashi	16	21	6			10		7
18	(Japan) Takamitsu Matsui	15	27	27	15	15	15	6	6
19	(Japan) Hibiki Taira	26	19	16	7	14	17	11	4
20	(Japan) Takurō Shinohara		7						4
21	(Japan) Shunji Okumoto		24	11	9	10	20	29	4
22	(Japan) Tsubasa Kondō	10	9				Ret		4
23	(Japan) Nobuteru Taniguchi	11	11	10	14	9	13	17	3
–	(Japan) Kengo Ichijō				11				0
–	(Japan) Yoshiyuki Tsuruga		17	12		29	18	20	0
–	(Japan) Naoki Hattori	17	14	23	13	27	26	13	0
–	(Japan) Motoo Morikawa	27		14		16	25	26	0
–	(Japan) Takashi Inoue	24	23	20	17	19	31	27	0
–	(Japan) Miki Onaga	25	Ret	24	18	20	27	19	0
–	(Japan) Hikaru Jitōsho					18	21	25	0
–	(Japan) Shōtarō Munetou	19	22	25	19	22	28	22	0
–	(Japan) Takashi Kogure	23	20		21		19	24	0
–	(Japan) Hiroyuki Saka	28	25	21		21	29	28	0
–	(Japan) Tomoaki Ichimori					26		21	0
–	(Japan) Keiichi Watanabe		Ret	22		23	30		0
–	(Japan) Kazuhito Ishii					24			0
–	(Hong Kong) Adrian Chung Kwok Hei	Ret	26						0
–	(Japan) Noboru Takashima						32	Ret	0
–	(Japan) Kōta Sasaki						Ret		0
Pos.	Driver	AUT	MOT	SUG	TOK	FSW	SUZ	OKA	Points

Key
Colour	Result
Gold	Race winner
Silver	2nd place
Bronze	3rd place
Green	Points finish
Blue	Non-points finish
Blue	Non-classified finish (NC)
Purple	Did not finish (Ret)
Black	Disqualified (DSQ)
Black	Excluded (EX)
White	Did not start (DNS)
White	Race cancelled (C)
White	Withdrew (WD)
Blank	Did not participate

**Bold** – Pole
Italics – Fastest Lap
