= 2020 F4 Japanese Championship =

F4 Japanese Championship season

The 2020 F4 Japanese Championship season was the sixth season of the F4 Japanese Championship. It was competed with 12 races over four triple-header rounds.

== Teams and drivers ==
All teams were Japanese-registered

Team	No.	Driver	Class	Rounds
Ito Engineering	2	(Japan) Keiji Nakao	I	All
Field Motorsports	3	(Japan) Sergeyevich Sato	I	All
Daydream Racing	4	(Japan) Yuichi Sasaki	I	1, 3
Vegaplus	5	(Japan) Syun Koide		2–4
Vegaplus	7	(Japan) Kakunoshin Ohta		2–4
Rn-sports	11	(Japan) Yugo Iwasawa		All
Rn-sports	18	(Japan) Makoto Hotta	I	2–4
KRac Motorsports	13	(Japan) Daiki Fujiwara		All
Zap Speed	14	(Japan) Rin Arakawa		All
Zap Speed	43	(Japan) Motoyoshi Yoshida	I	All
Zap Speed	86	(Japan) Hachiro Osaka	I	All
Media Do Kageyama Racing	16	(Japan) Kaito Tsukada		All
N-SPEED	23	(Japan) "Yugo"	I	All
TOM'S Youth	28	(Japan) Yuga Furutani		All
ATEAM Buzz Motorsport	31	(Japan) Seiya Jin		All
ATEAM Buzz Motorsport	32	(Japan) Hirotaka Kikuchi		All
ATEAM Buzz Motorsport	33	(Finland) Max Salo		All
ATEAM Buzz Motorsport	34	(Japan) Katsunori Keihara	I	1, 4
TGR-DC Racing School	35	(Japan) Hibiki Taira		All
TGR-DC Racing School	36	(Japan) Seita Nonaka		All
TGR-DC Racing School	37	(Japan) Eijiro Shimizu		All
TGR-DC Racing School	38	(Japan) Jiei Okuzumi		All
Saccess Racing	39	(Japan) Yoshiaki Nakamura		All
Saccess Racing	40	(Japan) Seiya Motojima		2, 4
Team Liaison	55	(Japan) Yusuke Tsuchiya		1–3
Bird	56	(Japan) Yutaka Toriba	I	1, 3–4
HELM Motorsports	62	(Japan) Reiji Hiraki		All
Leprix Sport	70	(Japan) Aito Kinoshita		1, 4
Akiland Racing	71	(Japan) Masayoshi Oyama	I	All
Akiland Racing	92	(Japan) Yuki Urata		2–4
Akiland Racing	95	(Japan) "Tomisan"	I	1
Akiland Racing	96	(Japan) Makio Saito	I	All
C.S.I-Reon Kids Racing	73	(Japan) Shunsuke Hanawa		1
Skill Speed	77	(Japan) Sota Ogawa		All
OTG Motor Sports	80	(Japan) Reimei Ito		All
Bionic Jack Racing	97	(Japan) Ryunosuke Sawa		All
Bionic Jack Racing	98	(Japan) "Ikari"	I	All
Privateer	24	(Japan) Tsuyoshi Usui	I	4
Privateer	25	(Japan) Fuma Horio		All

Icon	Class
I	Independent Cup

== Race calendar and results ==
All rounds were held in Japan and supported the Super GT events. On 18 March 2020, the original opening round at Okayama International Circuit was postponed to an undetermined date due to the 2019-20 coronavirus pandemic. On 30 March 2020 it was determined the second and third rounds also had to be postponed. On 5 April 2020 the Super GT Series issued a revised calendar in which the F4 Japanese Championship also confirmed their schedule change, with a newly revised calendar being issued on 17 July 2020.

Round		Circuit	Date	Pole position	Fastest lap	Winning driver	Winning team	Independent Cup winner
1	R1	Fuji Speedway, Oyama	3 October	(Japan) Seiya Jin	(Japan) Reiji Hiraki	(Japan) Reiji Hiraki	HELM Motorsports	(Japan) Keiji Nakao
1	R2	Fuji Speedway, Oyama	3 October	(Japan) Hibiki Taira	(Japan) Rin Arakawa	(Japan) Hibiki Taira	TGR-DC Racing School	(Japan) Makio Saito
1	R3	Fuji Speedway, Oyama	4 October		(Japan) Sota Ogawa	(Japan) Hibiki Taira	TGR-DC Racing School	(Japan) Yutaka Toriba
2	R4	Suzuka Circuit, Suzuka	24 October	(Japan) Hibiki Taira	(Japan) Rin Arakawa	(Japan) Hibiki Taira	TGR-DC Racing School	(Japan) Sergeyevich Sato
2	R5	Suzuka Circuit, Suzuka	24 October	(Japan) Hibiki Taira	(Japan) Kakunoshin Ohta	(Japan) Hibiki Taira	TGR-DC Racing School	(Japan) Makio Saito
2	R6	Suzuka Circuit, Suzuka	25 October		(Japan) Hibiki Taira	(Japan) Hibiki Taira	TGR-DC Racing School	(Japan) Sergeyevich Sato
3	R7	Twin Ring Motegi, Motegi	7 November	(Japan) Hibiki Taira	(Japan) Hibiki Taira	(Japan) Hibiki Taira	TGR-DC Racing School	(Japan) Sergeyevich Sato
3	R8	Twin Ring Motegi, Motegi	7 November	(Japan) Hibiki Taira	(Japan) Seiya Jin	(Japan) Hibiki Taira	TGR-DC Racing School	(Japan) Sergeyevich Sato
3	R9	Twin Ring Motegi, Motegi	8 November		(Japan) Hibiki Taira	(Japan) Hibiki Taira	TGR-DC Racing School	(Japan) "Ikari"
4	R10	Fuji Speedway, Oyama	28 November	(Japan) Sota Ogawa	(Japan) Reiji Hiraki	(Japan) Hibiki Taira	TGR-DC Racing School	(Japan) Sergeyevich Sato
4	R11	Fuji Speedway, Oyama	28 November	(Japan) Hibiki Taira	(Japan) Hibiki Taira	(Japan) Hibiki Taira	TGR-DC Racing School	(Japan) Makio Saito
4	R12	Fuji Speedway, Oyama	29 November		(Japan) Syun Koide	(Japan) Reiji Hiraki	HELM Motorsports	(Japan) Sergeyevich Sato

== Championship standings ==
Points were awarded as follows:

Position	**1st**	**2nd**	**3rd**	**4th**	**5th**	**6th**	**7th**	**8th**	**9th**	**10th**
Points	25	18	15	12	10	8	6	4	2	1

=== Drivers' standings ===
Pos	Driver	FUJ1			SUZ ^{‡}			MOT			FUJ2			Points
1	(Japan) Hibiki Taira	3	**1**	1	**1**	**1**	1	**1**	**1**	1	1	**1**	2	270.5
2	(Japan) Reiji Hiraki	1	4	4	4	3	2	2	3	5	6	2	1	180.5
3	(Japan) Seita Nonaka	2	3	2	3	4	11	3	6	4	Ret	5	7	123
4	(Japan) Sota Ogawa	7	6	7	7	12	7	5	2	2	**2**	3	5	121
5	(Japan) Reimei Ito	5	7	6	6	6	5	9	7	6	25	4	3	89
6	(Japan) Ryunosuke Sawa	9	11	5	8	Ret	8	4	4	3	3	9	8	80
7	(Japan) Kakunoshin Ohta				5	2	3	6	9	8	9	7	4	68
8	(Japan) Rin Arakawa	Ret	2	17	2	5	Ret	DNS	5	17	Ret	10	9	54
9	(Japan) Seiya Jin	**4**	5	3	17	Ret	DNS	7	28	7	Ret	11	13	49
10	(Japan) Syun Koide				12	11	6	Ret	8	13	4	8	6	36
11	(Japan) Fuma Horio	6	8	9	19	14	18	NC	16	12	5	12	10	25
12	(Japan) Jiei Okuzumi	8	10	8	14	Ret	19	23†	10	9	Ret	6	11	20
13	(Japan) Seiya Motojima				9	15	4				11	13	14	14
14	(Japan) Yuki Urata				20	23	9	21	15	30	7	14	12	8
15	(Japan) Hirotaka Kikuchi	12	22	11	10	7	10	Ret	12	16	Ret	Ret	15	5
16	(Japan) Yuga Furutani	11	Ret	16	15	9	14	8	14	11	21	17	26	5
17	(Japan) Eijiro Shimizu	10	9	10	Ret	13	15	10	11	14	Ret	DNS	17	5
18	(Japan) Yoshiaki Nakamura	16	12	12	13	10	12	25	20	20	8	15	32	4.5
19	(Japan) Yugo Iwasawa	Ret	DNS	15	11	8	13	24†	17	10	Ret	Ret	DNS	3
20	(Japan) Daiki Fujiwara	15	14	14	18	17	16	12	19	19	10	16	21	1
21	(Japan) Yusuke Tsuchiya	13	Ret	19	Ret	Ret	24	11	18	18				0
22	(Finland) Max Salo	30	20	18	24	Ret	30†	15	23	21	12	19	19	0
23	(Japan) Kaito Tsukada	14	24	13	16	16	17	22	13	15	Ret	WD	WD	0
24	(Japan) Sergeyevich Sato	18	18	21	21	19	20	13	21	Ret	13	21	18	0
25	(Japan) Aito Kinoshita	19	13	Ret							14	18	16	0
26	(Japan) Keiji Nakao	17	16	23	26	20	28	14	DNS	28	15	22	23	0
27	(Japan) Makio Saito	20	15	22	22	18	21	16	22	23	Ret	20	20	0
28	(Japan) "Ikari"	23	19	24	23	24	23	Ret	Ret	22	16	23	Ret	0
29	(Japan) Hachiro Osaka	28	21	26	Ret	DNS	25	17	25	25	17	24	22	0
30	(Japan) Yutaka Toriba	21	17	20				Ret	Ret	WD	DSQ	30	24	0
31	(Japan) Motoyoshi Yoshida	24	26	Ret	Ret	26	27	18	27	26	19	26	27	0
32	(Japan) Makoto Hotta				27	21	22	Ret	26	24	18	25	25	0
33	(Japan) Masayoshi Oyama	27	27	27	25	22	26	19	29	27	20	29	28	0
34	(Japan) "Yugo"	26	28	29	Ret	25	29	20	30	WD	22	28	29	0
35	(Japan) Yuichi Sasaki	22	23	28				Ret	24	29				0
36	(Japan) Tsuyoshi Usui										23	27	30	0
37	(Japan) Katsunori Keihara	31	Ret	Ret							24	31	31	0
38	(Japan) "Tomisan"	25	25	25										0
39	(Japan) Shunsuke Hanawa	29	DNS	DNS										0
Pos	Driver	FUJ1			SUZ ^{‡}			MOT			FUJ2			Points

Colour	Result
Gold	Winner
Silver	Second place
Bronze	Third place
Green	Points classification
Blue	Non-points classification
Blue	Non-classified finish (NC)
Purple	Retired, not classified (Ret)
Red	Did not qualify (DNQ)
Red	Did not pre-qualify (DNPQ)
Black	Disqualified (DSQ)
White	Did not start (DNS)
White	Withdrew (WD)
White	Race cancelled (C)
Blank	Did not practice (DNP)
Blank	Did not arrive (DNA)
Blank	Excluded (EX)

**Bold** – Pole
Italics – Fastest Lap
† — Did not finish, but classified

^{‡} – Half points were awarded for race 2, as less than 75% of the scheduled distance was completed.

=== Independent Cup ===
Pos	Driver	FUJ1			SUZ ^{‡}			MOT			FUJ2			Points
1	(Japan) Sergeyevich Sato	18	18	21	21	19	20	13	21	Ret	13	21	18	225
2	(Japan) Makio Saito	20	15	22	22	18	21	16	22	23	Ret	20	20	197.5
3	(Japan) Keiji Nakao	17	16	23	26	20	28	14	DNS	28	15	22	23	145.5
4	(Japan) "Ikari"	23	19	24	23	24	23	Ret	Ret	22	16	23	Ret	111
5	(Japan) Hachiro Osaka	28	21	26	Ret	DNS	25	17	25	25	17	24	22	97
6	(Japan) Makoto Hotta				27	21	22	Ret	26	24	18	25	25	77
7	(Japan) Masayoshi Oyama	27	27	27	25	22	26	19	29	27	20	29	28	64
8	(Japan) Motoyoshi Yoshida	24	26	Ret	Ret	26	27	18	27	26	19	26	27	64
9	(Japan) Yutaka Toriba	21	17	20				Ret	Ret	WD	DSQ	30	24	62
10	(Japan) Yuichi Sasaki	22	23	28				Ret	24	29				37
11	(Japan) "Yugo"	26	28	29	Ret	25	29	20	30	WD	22	28	29	26
12	(Japan) "Tomisan"	25	25	25										16
13	(Japan) Tsuyoshi Usui										23	27	30	7
14	(Japan) Katsunori Keihara	31	Ret	Ret							24	31	31	1
Pos	Driver	FUJ1			SUZ ^{‡}			MOT			FUJ2			Points

^{‡} – Half points were awarded for race 2, as less than 75% of the scheduled distance was completed.

=== Teams' standings ===
Only the best finisher scored points for a team.

Pos	Team	Points
1	TGR-DC Racing School	273.5
2	HELM Motorsports	180.5
3	Skill Speed	121
4	OTG Motor Sports	89
5	Bionic Jack Racing	80
6	Vegaplus	80
7	Zap Speed	54
8	ATEAM Buzz Motorsport	54
9	Saccess Racing	18.5
10	Privateer (Fuma Horio)	14
11	Akiland Racing	8
12	TOM'S Youth	5
13	Rn-sports	3
14	KRac Motorsports	1
