= Yuui Tsutsumi =

Japanese racing driver

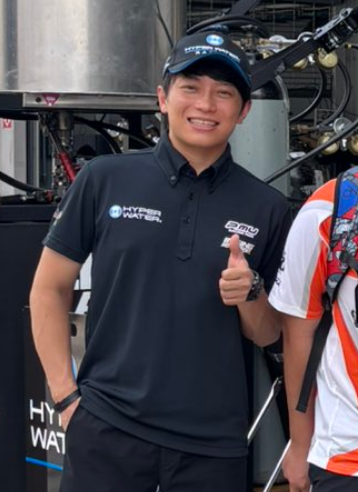
- Tsutsumi at the 2025 Super GT Malaysia Festival
- Nationality: (Japan) Japanese
- Born: 9 September 1995 (age 31) Kanagawa, Japan

Super GT Series - GT300 career
- Debut season: 2020
- Current team: INGING Motorsport
- Car number: 2
- Former teams: Panther Team Thailand, Max Racing
- Starts: 29
- Wins: 2
- Podiums: 4
- Poles: 1
- Fastest laps: 2
- Best finish: 2nd in 2023

Previous series
- 2023 2018: Super Formula Lights; F4 Japanese Championship

Yuui Tsutsumi (堤優威, Tsutsumi Yuui; born 9 September 1995) is a Japanese racing driver who currently competes in Super Formula Lights for Rn-sports and in Super GT for INGING.

== Career ==
=== Super Formula Lights ===
Tsutsumi was signed by Rn-sports to compete in the 2023 season.

=== Super GT ===
In his inaugural Super GT season in 2020, Tsutsumi was signed to arto Ping An Team Thailand. He then signed with Max Racing for 2021, as they changed vehicles to the GT300 spec Toyota GR Supra. Tsutsumi and his teammate Atsushi Miyake won their first Super GT race at Suzuka Circuit in August, finishing fifth in the GT300 drivers' championship. Tsutsumi signed with muta Racing INGING in 2022, where he partnered with Hiroki Katoh. As he continued to race for muta Inging in 2023, Tsutsumi was partnered with Hibiki Taira.

== Racing record ==
=== Racing career summary ===
Season	Series	Team	Races	Wins	Poles	F/Laps	Podiums	Points	Position
2017	Super Taikyū - ST-4	TC Corse	6	0	0	0	0	39‡	5th‡
2018	F4 Japanese Championship	Media Do Kageyama Racing	2	0	0	0	0	0	28th
2019	Super Taikyū - ST-3	Tracy Sports	5	2	0	0	5	112.5‡	**3rd‡**
2020	Super GT - GT300	arto Ping An Team Thailand	4	0	0	0	0	0	NC
2020	Super GT - GT300	ADVICS muta Racing Inging	1	0	0	0	0	0	NC
2020	Super GT - GT300	Max Racing	1	0	0	0	0		
2020	Super Taikyū - ST-1	ADVICS Muta Racing	2	0	0	0	2	50‡	**2nd‡**
2021	Super GT - GT300	Max Racing	8	1	0	0	1	44	5th
2021	Super Taikyū - ST-1	Tracy Sports	5	2	2	1	5	124‡	**2nd‡**
2022	Super GT - GT300	muta Racing INGING	8	1	0	0	1	24.5	14th
2022	Super Taikyū - ST-1	Tracy Sports	6	1	2	0	5	128‡	**3rd‡**
2023	Super GT - GT300	muta Racing INGING	8	0	1	1	3	53	**2nd**
2023	Super Formula Lights	Rn-Sports	12	0	0	0	1	14	10th
2023	Super Taikyū - ST-Q	Mazda Spirit Racing							
2023	TGR GR86/BRZ Cup	T by Two CABANA Racing	7	1	0	1	3	67	**2nd**
2024	Super GT - GT300	muta Racing INGING	8	1	0	0	4	80	**3rd**
2024	Super Taikyu - ST-Q	Mazda Spirit Racing							
2024	TGR GR86/BRZ Cup	T by Two CABANA Racing	8	0	0	1	3	55	4th
2025	Super GT - GT300	Hyper Water Racing INGING	8	0	0	0	2	63.5	10th
2025	TSS The Super Series - GT4	Inging Autowerks Racing	2	0	0	0	1	15	13th
2025	Super Taikyu - ST-Q	Mazda Spirit Racing							
2025	TGR GR86/BRZ Cup	T by Two CABANA Racing	7	1	2	1	5	88	**1st**
2026	Super GT - GT300	Hyper Water Racing INGING	8	0	0	0	1	65	6th
2026	Super Taikyu - ST-Q	Mazda Spirit Racing							
2026	TGR GR86/BRZ Cup	T by Two CABANA Racing							

‡ Team standings

=== Complete F4 Japanese Championship results ===
(key) (Races in bold indicate pole position; races in italics indicate points for the fastest lap of top ten finishers)

Year	Team	1	2	3	4	5	6	7	8	9	10	11	12	13	14	DC	Points
2018	Media Do Kageyama Racing	OKA; 1	OKA; 2	FUJ1; 1	FUJ1; 2	SUZ; 1	SUZ; 2	FUJ2; 1	FUJ2; 2	SUG; 1	SUG; 2	AUT; 1; 15	AUT; 2; 14	MOT; 1	MOT; 2	28th	0

=== Complete Super GT results ===
(key) (Races in bold indicate pole position; races in italics indicate fastest lap)

Year	Team	Car	Class	1	2	3	4	5	6	7	8	9	DC	Points
2020	arto Ping An Team Thailand	Lexus RC F GT3	GT300	FUJ	FUJ; Ret	SUZ; 15	MOT; 19	FUJ; 21	SUZ				NC	0
2020	Advics muta Racing Inging	Toyota 86 MC	GT300							MOT; 22			NC	0
2020	Max Racing	Lexus RC F GT3	GT300								FUJ; 24		NC	0
2021	Max Racing	Toyota GR Supra GT	GT300	OKA; 5	FUJ; 11	SUZ; 1	MOT; 5	SUG; 9	AUT; 17	MOT; 7	FUJ; 7		5th	44
2022	muta Racing Inging	Toyota GR86	GT300	OKA; 20	FUJ; 8	SUZ; 14	FUJ; 18	SUZ; 8	SUG; 1	AUT; 27	MOT; 12		14th	24.5
2023	muta Racing Inging	Toyota GR86 GT300	GT300	OKA; 18	FUJ; 2	SUZ; 2	FUJ; 11	SUZ; 7	SUG; Ret	**AUT**; 2	**MOT**; 9		2nd	53
2024	muta Racing Inging	Toyota GR86 GT300	GT300	OKA; 1^{2}	FUJ; 6	SUZ; 2^{3}	FUJ; 8	SUG; 8	AUT; 2	MOT; 13	SUZ; 2^{3}		3rd	80
2025	Hyper Water Racing INGING	Toyota GR86 GT300	GT300	OKA; 10	FUJ; 3	SEP; 5	FS1 (6)	FS2; 2	SUZ; 12	SUG; Ret	AUT; 12	MOT; 9	10th	63.5
2026	Hyper Water Racing INGING	Toyota GR86 GT300	GT300	OKA; 2	FUJ; 5	FUJ; 7	SUZ; 20	SUG; 17	AUT; 4	MOT; 12	MOT; 8		6th	65

^{‡} Half points awarded as less than 75% of race distance was completed.
^{(Number)} Driver did not take part in this sprint race, points are still awarded for the teammate's result.
^{*} Season still in progress.

=== Complete Super Formula Lights results ===
(key) (Races in bold indicate pole position) (Races in italics indicate fastest lap)

Year	Entrant	1	2	3	4	5	6	7	8	9	10	11	12	13	14	15	16	17	18	Pos	Points
2023	Rn-sports	AUT; 1; 8	AUT; 2; 8	AUT; 3; 8	SUG; 1; 7	SUG; 2; 7	SUG; 3; 5	SUZ; 1; 9	SUZ; 2; 10	SUZ; 3; 9	FUJ; 1; 2	FUJ; 2; 5	FUJ; 3; 4	OKA; 1	OKA; 2	OKA; 3	MOT; 1	MOT; 2	MOT; 3	10th	14
