= 2021 Super Formula Lights =

Motor racing competition

The 2021 Super Formula Lights Championship was the second Super Formula Lights Championship season, after the Japanese Formula 3 Championship was rebranded following the end of the 2019 season. It featured drivers competing in Formula 3 cars with Dallara 320 chassis and with engines made by three different manufacturers, a similar regulation format to the Euroformula Open Championship.

== Teams and drivers ==
Team	Engine	No.	Driver	Status	Rounds
TOM'S	TOM'S TAZ31	1	(Japan) Seita Nonaka		1–5
TOM'S	TOM'S TAZ31	1	(Japan) Kazuto Kotaka		6
TOM'S	TOM'S TAZ31	36	(France) Giuliano Alesi		All
TOM'S	TOM'S TAZ31	37	(Japan) Hibiki Taira		All
Toda Racing	Spiess A41	2	(Japan) Ren Sato		All
ALBIREX Racing Team	Tomei TB14F3 2020	3	(Republic of Ireland) Lucca Allen		1–2, 4
ALBIREX Racing Team	Tomei TB14F3 2020	5	(Japan) Seiya Jin		1
ALBIREX Racing Team	Tomei TB14F3 2020	5	(Japan) Tsubasa Iriyama		2
B-Max Engineering	Spiess A41	4	(Japan) Nobuhiro Imada	M	All
B-Max Engineering	Spiess A41	30	(Japan) "Dragon"		All
B-Max Engineering	Spiess A41	51	(Japan) Miki Koyama		1
B-Max Engineering	Spiess A41	51	(Japan) Takashi Hata	M	2, 4
B-Max Engineering	Spiess A41	51	(Japan) "Syuji"	M	3, 5–6
B-Max Racing Team	Spiess A41	50	(Japan) Teppei Natori		All
B-Max Racing Team	Spiess A41	52	(Japan) Seiya Jin		5–6
Rn-Sports	Spiess A41	10	(Japan) Atsushi Miyake		All
Rn-Sports	Spiess A41	11	(Japan) Masayuki Ueda	M	1–2, 4–6
RS Fine	TOM'S TAZ31	35	(Japan) Shunsuke Kohno		All

Icon	Class
M	Masters' Cup.

== Race Calendar ==
The calendar for the 2021 season was announced on 30 October 2020. The championship supported Super Formula at all of its races. Because of this, the calendar change announced by Super Formula on 12 April 2021 was also adopted by Super Formula Lights.

Round		Circuit	Date	Pole position	Fastest lap	Winning driver	Winning team	Masters Winner
1	R1	Fuji Speedway	3 April	(Japan) Teppei Natori	(Japan) Teppei Natori	(Japan) Teppei Natori	B-Max Racing Team	(Japan) Nobuhiro Imada
1	R2	Fuji Speedway	4 April	(Japan) Teppei Natori	(Japan) Ren Sato	(Japan) Ren Sato	Toda Racing	(Japan) Nobuhiro Imada
1	R3	Fuji Speedway	4 April		(Japan) Ren Sato	(Japan) Atsushi Miyake	Rn-Sports	(Japan) Masayuki Ueda
2	R4	Suzuka International Racing Course	24 April	(Japan) Teppei Natori	(Japan) Teppei Natori	(Japan) Teppei Natori	B-Max Racing Team	(Japan) Nobuhiro Imada
2	R5	Suzuka International Racing Course	25 April	(Japan) Teppei Natori	(Japan) Teppei Natori	(Japan) Teppei Natori	B-Max Racing Team	(Japan) Masayuki Ueda
2	R6	Suzuka International Racing Course	25 April		(Japan) Ren Sato	(Japan) Teppei Natori	B-Max Racing Team	(Japan) Nobuhiro Imada
3	R7	Autopolis	15 May	(Japan) Ren Sato (Note: Qualifying was cancelled due to heavy rain. The grid was decided by times set during practice. No points were awarded for pole position in each class.)	(Japan) Atsushi Miyake	(Japan) Atsushi Miyake	Rn-Sports	(Japan) Nobuhiro Imada
3	R8	Autopolis	16 May	(Japan) Ren Sato (Note: Qualifying was cancelled due to heavy rain. The grid was decided by times set during practice. No points were awarded for pole position in each class.)	(France) Giuliano Alesi	(Japan) Teppei Natori	B-Max Racing Team	(Japan) "Syuji"
3	R9	Autopolis	16 May	Race cancelled due to inclement weather.				
4	R10	Sportsland SUGO	19 June	(France) Giuliano Alesi	(France) Giuliano Alesi	(France) Giuliano Alesi	TOM'S	(Japan) Takashi Hata
4	R11	Sportsland SUGO	20 June	(Japan) Teppei Natori	(Japan) Teppei Natori	(Japan) Teppei Natori	B-Max Racing Team	(Japan) Nobuhiro Imada
4	R12	Sportsland SUGO	20 June		(Japan) Teppei Natori	(France) Giuliano Alesi	TOM'S	(Japan) Nobuhiro Imada
5	R13	Twin Ring Motegi	28 August	(Japan) Ren Sato	(Japan) Ren Sato	(Japan) Ren Sato	Toda Racing	(Japan) Nobuhiro Imada
5	R14	Twin Ring Motegi	29 August	(Japan) Ren Sato	(Japan) Ren Sato	(Japan) Ren Sato	Toda Racing	(Japan) Nobuhiro Imada
5	R9	Twin Ring Motegi	29 August		(Japan) Ren Sato	(Japan) Ren Sato	Toda Racing	(Japan) Nobuhiro Imada
6	R15	Twin Ring Motegi	16 October	(Japan) Teppei Natori	(France) Giuliano Alesi	(France) Giuliano Alesi	TOM'S	(Japan) Nobuhiro Imada
6	R16	Twin Ring Motegi	17 October	(France) Giuliano Alesi	(France) Giuliano Alesi	(Japan) Ren Sato	Toda Racing	(Japan) Masayuki Ueda
6	R17	Twin Ring Motegi	17 October		(France) Giuliano Alesi	(France) Giuliano Alesi	TOM'S	(Japan) Nobuhiro Imada

== Championship standings ==
The points were awarded as follows:

1	2	3	4	5	6	PP	FL
10	7	5	3	2	1	1	1

=== Drivers' Championships ===
==== Overall ====
Pos	Driver	FUJ			SUZ			AUT (Note: Due to heavy fog only two of the 10 laps were completed under green flag conditions. Therefore, half points were awarded.)			SUG			MOT1			MOT2			Points
Pos	Driver	R1	R2	R3	R1	R2	R3	R1	R2	R3	R1	R2	R3	R1	R2	R3	R1	R2	R3	Points
1	(Japan) Teppei Natori	1	2	2	1	1	1	5	1	C	2	1	2	2	4	7	4	10	8	109
2	(France) Giuliano Alesi	3	6	3	2	3	2	2	2	C	1	4	1	3	2	2	1	12	1	103
3	(Japan) Ren Sato	2	1	9	12†	2	5	9	9	C	7	2	6	1	1	1	2	1	4	92
4	(Japan) Atsushi Miyake	6	5	1	4	6	4	1	6	C	5	5	4	6	3	5	3	6	2	57
5	(Japan) Hibiki Taira	4	DNS	4	5	4	3	4	4	C	3	3	3	WD	WD	WD	6	4	5	41.5
6	(Japan) Shunsuke Kohno	5	7	Ret	6	7	6	3	3	C	4	Ret	5	4	6	4	8	3	6	29.5
7	(Japan) Seita Nonaka	10	3	6	3	5	7	Ret	5	C	6	Ret	7	5	5	3				24
8	(Japan) Kazuto Kotaka																5	2	3	14
9	(Japan) Seiya Jin	Ret	4	5										7	7	6	7	5	7	8
10	(Japan) Nobuhiro Imada	8	10	11	8	12†	10	6	10	C	9	7	10	9	9	9	9	9	9	1
11	(Republic of Ireland) Lucca Allen	WD	WD	WD	WD	WD	WD				11	6	8							1
12	(Japan) "Dragon"	9	9	8	11	8	9	8	7	C	Ret	8	9	8	8	8	10	7	11	0
13	(Japan) Miki Koyama	7	8	7																0
14	(Japan) "Syuji"							7	8	C				10	10	10	12	11	12	0
15	(Japan) Tsubasa Iriyama				7	11	8													0
16	(Japan) Masayuki Ueda	11	11	10	9	9	11				10	10	11	WD	WD	WD	11	8	10	0
17	(Japan) Takashi Hata				10	10	Ret				8	9	12							0
Pos	Driver	R1	R2	R3	R1	R2	R3	R1	R2	R3	R1	R2	R3	R1	R2	R3	R1	R2	R3	Points
Pos	Driver	FUJ			SUZ			AUT			SUG			MOT1			MOT2			Points

==== Masters Class ====
Pos	Driver	FUJ			SUZ			AUT (Note: Due to heavy fog only two of the 10 laps were completed under green flag conditions. Therefore, half points were awarded.)			SUG			MOT1			MOT2			Points
Pos	Driver	R1	R2	R3	R1	R2	R3	R1	R2	R3	R1	R2	R3	R1	R2	R3	R1	R2	R3	Points
1	(Japan) Nobuhiro Imada	1	1	2	1	3†	1	1	2	C	2	1	1	1	1	1	1	2	1	156
2	(Japan) Masayuki Ueda	2	2	1	2	1	2				3	3	2	WD	WD	WD	2	1	2	90
3	(Japan) "Syuji"							2	1	C				2	2	2	3	3	3	48.5
4	(Japan) Takashi Hata				3	2	Ret				1	2	3							35
Pos	Driver	R1	R2	R3	R1	R2	R3	R1	R2	R3	R1	R2	R3	R1	R2	R3	R1	R2	R3	Points
Pos	Driver	FUJ			SUZ			AUT			SUG			MOT1			MOT2			Points

=== Teams' standings ===
Pos	Team	Points
1	TOM'S	102
2	B-Max Racing Team	98
3	Toda Racing	84
4	Rn-Sports	56
5	RS Fine	29.5
6	ALBIREX Racing Team	6
7	B-Max Engineering	1

=== Engine manufacturer standings ===
Pos	Team	Points
1	Siegfried Spiess Motorenbau	134
2	TOM'S	102
3	Tomei Engine	6
