= 2023 Super Formula Lights =

Formula racing championship

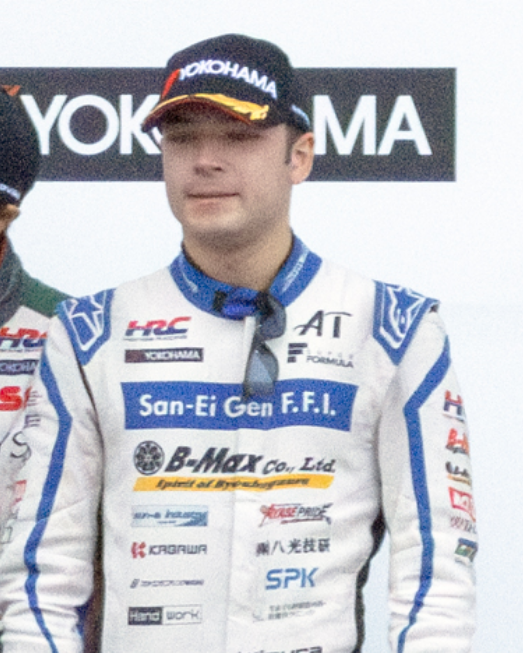
Iori Kimura (pictured in 2024) took the Drivers' Championship title driving for B-Max Racing Team.

The 2023 Super Formula Lights Championship was the fourth Super Formula Lights Championship season, after the Japanese Formula 3 Championship was rebranded following the end of the 2019 season. It featured drivers competing in Dallara 320 chassis and with engines made by three different manufacturers, a similar regulation format to the Euroformula Open Championship.

Honda junior Iori Kimura won the Drivers' Championship, while his team, B-Max Racing, won the Teams' Championship. His teammate Nobuhiro Imada won the Masters' Class title, while Spiess won the Engine Manufacturer's Championship.

== Teams and drivers ==
Team	Engine	No.	Driver	Status	Rounds
TOM'S	TOM'S TAZ31	1	(Japan) Hibiki Taira		All
TOM'S	TOM'S TAZ31	35	(Japan) Seita Nonaka		All
TOM'S	TOM'S TAZ31	36	(Japan) Yuga Furutani		All
TOM'S	TOM'S TAZ31	37	(Italy) Enzo Trulli		All
Toda Racing	Spiess A41	2	(Japan) Syun Koide		All
B-Max Racing Team	Spiess A41	4	(Japan) Nobuhiro Imada	M	1–2, 4–6
B-Max Racing Team	Spiess A41	4	(Japan) Togo Suganami		3
B-Max Racing Team	Spiess A41	50	(Japan) Iori Kimura		All
B-Max Racing Team	Spiess A41	51	(Spain) David Vidales		All
B-Max Racing Team	Spiess A41	52	(Brazil) Igor Omura Fraga		All
B-Max Racing Team	Spiess A41	53	(Japan) Takashi Hata	M	1–3, 5
B-Max Racing Team	Spiess A41	53	(Japan) Togo Suganami		4, 6
B-Max Racing Team	ThreeBond Tomei TB14F3	30	(Japan) "Dragon"	M	1–2, 4–6
B-Max Racing Team	ThreeBond Tomei TB14F3	30	(Japan) "Dragon"		3
Rn-sports	Spiess A41	10	(Japan) Yuui Tsutsumi		1–4
Rn-sports	Spiess A41	10	(Japan) Sota Ogawa		6

Icon	Class
M	Masters' Cup.

=== Team changes ===
HELM Motorsports, who made their debut in the championship in 2022, left Super Formula Lights after already missing the final two rounds of 2022.

B-Max Racing's owner "Dragon" switched from using Spiess engines like the rest of his team to using a TOMEI engine for his car.

=== Driver changes ===
TOM'S saw the reigning champion Kazuto Kotaka graduated to Super Formula with Kondō Racing. The team signed 2021 Formula 4 UAE champion Enzo Trulli.

Kakunoshin Ohta was promoted to Super Formula to race with Dandelion Racing. Toda Racing promoted reigning Japanese F4 champion Syun Koide to replace Ohta.

B-Max Racing will have a new line up as Togo Suganami left the series to focus on his Super GT GT300 season with Tsuchiya Engineering. The team signed two international drivers in David Vidales and Igor Fraga, both graduating from Formula 3, where the former came 16th in 2022 and the latter returned to racing after two years. 2021 Formula Regional Japanese Masters champion Takashi Hata joins the team.

HELM Motorsports' owners and drivers, Yuya and Reiji Hiraki, left the series where both teams and drivers focus on their Super Taikyu ST-X program.

Rn-sports saw all three of their drivers, gentleman driver Masayuki Ueda, as well as Kohta Kawaai and Seiya Motojima, who shared a cockpit in 2022, leave the series. The team signed Super GT GT300 race winner Yuui Tsutsumi.

=== Mid-season changes ===
Togo Suganami replaced Nobuhiro Imada in the No. 4 B-Max car for the Suzuka weekend.

Imada was back for the round at Fuji, with Suganami switching to the No. 53 car of the same team to replace Takashi Hata.

Yuui Tsutsumi and his team, Rn-sports, did not attend round five.

Rn-sports returned to competition for the final round, albeit with Formula Regional Japanese champion Sota Ogawa piloting the No. 10 car.

Suganami returned to replace Hata for the final round.

== Race calendar ==
The calendar for the 2023 season was announced on 30 November 2022. With the first event being in late May, the season started six weeks later than usual. Only three events were held supporting the parent Super Formula Championship, a significant reduction from previous years.

Round		Circuit	Date	Supporting	Map of circuit locations
1	R1	Autopolis, Hita	20 May	Super Formula Championship; Honda N-One Owner's Cup	2023 Super Formula Lights is located in Japan
1	R2	Autopolis, Hita	21 May	Super Formula Championship; Honda N-One Owner's Cup	2023 Super Formula Lights is located in Japan
1	R3	Autopolis, Hita	21 May	Super Formula Championship; Honda N-One Owner's Cup	2023 Super Formula Lights is located in Japan
2	R4	Sportsland Sugo, Murata	17 June	Super Formula Championship; Legend Cars Japan	2023 Super Formula Lights is located in Japan
2	R5	Sportsland Sugo, Murata	18 June	Super Formula Championship; Legend Cars Japan	2023 Super Formula Lights is located in Japan
2	R6	Sportsland Sugo, Murata	18 June	Super Formula Championship; Legend Cars Japan	2023 Super Formula Lights is located in Japan
3	R7	Suzuka International Racing Course, Suzuka	1 July	Porsche Carrera Cup Asia; VITA Race Suzuka; Suzuka - Okayama Challenge Cup	2023 Super Formula Lights is located in Japan
3	R8	Suzuka International Racing Course, Suzuka	2 July	Porsche Carrera Cup Asia; VITA Race Suzuka; Suzuka - Okayama Challenge Cup	2023 Super Formula Lights is located in Japan
3	R9	Suzuka International Racing Course, Suzuka	2 July	Porsche Carrera Cup Asia; VITA Race Suzuka; Suzuka - Okayama Challenge Cup	2023 Super Formula Lights is located in Japan
4	R10	Fuji Speedway, Oyama	15 July	Super Formula Championship; Lamborghini Super Trofeo Asia	2023 Super Formula Lights is located in Japan
4	R11	Fuji Speedway, Oyama	16 July	Super Formula Championship; Lamborghini Super Trofeo Asia	2023 Super Formula Lights is located in Japan
4	R12	Fuji Speedway, Oyama	16 July	Super Formula Championship; Lamborghini Super Trofeo Asia	2023 Super Formula Lights is located in Japan
5	R13	Okayama International Circuit, Mimasaka	9 September	TGR 86/BRZ Race; SuperKart Okayama International Series; Yaris Cup West Japan Series	2023 Super Formula Lights is located in Japan
5	R14	Okayama International Circuit, Mimasaka	10 September	TGR 86/BRZ Race; SuperKart Okayama International Series; Yaris Cup West Japan Series	2023 Super Formula Lights is located in Japan
5	R15	Okayama International Circuit, Mimasaka	10 September	TGR 86/BRZ Race; SuperKart Okayama International Series; Yaris Cup West Japan Series	2023 Super Formula Lights is located in Japan
6	R16	Mobility Resort Motegi, Motegi	18 November	Motegi Champion Cup; Mini Joy Endurance; Super FJ	2023 Super Formula Lights is located in Japan
6	R17	Mobility Resort Motegi, Motegi	19 November	Motegi Champion Cup; Mini Joy Endurance; Super FJ	2023 Super Formula Lights is located in Japan
6	R18	Mobility Resort Motegi, Motegi	19 November	Motegi Champion Cup; Mini Joy Endurance; Super FJ	2023 Super Formula Lights is located in Japan

== Race results ==
Round		Circuit	Pole position	Fastest lap	Winning driver	Winning team	Masters winner
1	R1	Autopolis	(Japan) Iori Kimura	(Japan) Iori Kimura	(Japan) Iori Kimura	B-Max Racing Team	(Japan) Nobuhiro Imada
1	R2	Autopolis	(Japan) Iori Kimura	(Japan) Iori Kimura	(Japan) Iori Kimura	B-Max Racing Team	(Japan) "Dragon"
1	R3	Autopolis		(Japan) Iori Kimura	(Japan) Iori Kimura	B-Max Racing Team	(Japan) "Dragon"
2	R4	Sportsland Sugo	(Japan) Hibiki Taira	(Japan) Hibiki Taira	(Japan) Hibiki Taira	TOM'S	(Japan) Nobuhiro Imada
2	R5	Sportsland Sugo	(Japan) Hibiki Taira	(Japan) Iori Kimura	(Japan) Hibiki Taira	TOM'S	(Japan) Nobuhiro Imada
2	R6	Sportsland Sugo		(Japan) Seita Nonaka	(Brazil) Igor Omura Fraga	B-Max Racing Team	(Japan) "Dragon"
3	R7	Suzuka International Racing Course	(Japan) Hibiki Taira	(Brazil) Igor Omura Fraga	(Japan) Togo Suganami	B-Max Racing Team	(Japan) Takashi Hata
3	R8	Suzuka International Racing Course	(Japan) Iori Kimura	(Japan) Iori Kimura	(Japan) Iori Kimura	B-Max Racing Team	(Japan) Takashi Hata
3	R9	Suzuka International Racing Course		(Japan) Hibiki Taira	(Japan) Hibiki Taira	TOM'S	(Japan) Takashi Hata
4	R10	Fuji Speedway	(Italy) Enzo Trulli	(Italy) Enzo Trulli	(Italy) Enzo Trulli	TOM'S	(Japan) Nobuhiro Imada
4	R11	Fuji Speedway	(Japan) Hibiki Taira	(Japan) Hibiki Taira	(Japan) Syun Koide	Toda Racing	(Japan) Nobuhiro Imada
4	R12	Fuji Speedway		(Japan) Iori Kimura	(Italy) Enzo Trulli	TOM'S	(Japan) Nobuhiro Imada
5	R13	Okayama International Circuit	(Japan) Syun Koide	(Japan) Syun Koide	(Japan) Syun Koide	Toda Racing	(Japan) Nobuhiro Imada
5	R14	Okayama International Circuit	(Brazil) Igor Omura Fraga	(Japan) Hibiki Taira	(Japan) Syun Koide	Toda Racing	(Japan) "Dragon"
5	R15	Okayama International Circuit		(Japan) Syun Koide	(Japan) Syun Koide	Toda Racing	(Japan) Nobuhiro Imada
6	R16	Mobility Resort Motegi	(Japan) Iori Kimura	(Japan) Iori Kimura	(Japan) Iori Kimura	B-Max Racing Team	(Japan) Nobuhiro Imada
6	R17	Mobility Resort Motegi	(Japan) Iori Kimura	(Japan) Iori Kimura	(Japan) Iori Kimura	B-Max Racing Team	(Japan) Nobuhiro Imada
6	R18	Mobility Resort Motegi		(Japan) Togo Suganami	(Japan) Togo Suganami	B-Max Racing Team	(Japan) Nobuhiro Imada

== Season report ==
The fourth Super Formula Lights Championship began at Autopolis in late May with B-Max Racing's Iori Kimura taking two pole positions. His teammate Igor Fraga qualified second, but started his campaign with a stall and retired a few laps later. This promoted the TOM'S pair of Hibiki Taira and Yuga Furutani onto the podium, where they stayed until the end of the race. Race two began with Toda Racing's Syun Koide challenging Kimura for the lead, but the latter prevailed and the former had to settle for second. Furutani completed the podium once again. The third race was another calm affair for Kimura to complete his clean sweep of the weekend, while Taira and Furutani battled out the podium places behind him. Taira would established himself in second. The field left the first round with Kimura as the points leader, already 20 points ahead of Taira and Furutani.

Sportsland Sugo played host for the second round, and this time Taira was the one to claim both pole positions. Multiple stalls and accidents at the start of the first race meant a lengthy safety car with Fraga and Kimura following Taira home when it was finally retracted. Race two saw another controlled effort by Taira to claim his second win. Kimura behind him stayed close, but was unable to mount an attack for the lead. Koide had a quiet race to finish third. The final race of the weekend looked set to grant Taira a triple win, before his car got stuck in fourth gear three laps from the end. This saw him drop down, before he spun around. Fraga inherited the lead and took the win, with his teammate Enzo Trulli and Koide completing the podium. Kimura did not score either in the third race, allowing Taira to shorten the points gap to ten points.

Championship leaders Taira and Kimura shared pole positions for round three at Suzuka. The first race began in foggy conditions with Fraga running himself and two other cars off the road, before hitting Kimura when he rejoined. More chaos ensued when rain then started to fall, with B-Max Racing's Togo Suganami coming through to win the race ahead of Taira and his teammate Seita Nonaka. The second race was more straightforward: Kimura won from pole position, while Taira took second from Nonaka on the final straight to come home 0.185 seconds ahead. Suganami had pole position for the final race, but Taira was quicker off the line to take the lead. Nonaka started third and also finished there to make it three straight podiums. Taira won race three, taking the championship lead in the process as Kimura's non-score in the first race saw him drop two points behind.

Fuji Speedway kicked off the second half of the championship with Trulli and Taira sharing pole positions. The Italian was unopposed at the start of the first race and managed his pace from then on to take his maiden win. Rn-sports driver Yuui Tsutsumi held second, until Taira started closing up to him late in the race, but he was unable to get past. Kimura and Taira had a heated battle all throughout the second race, with both drivers earning five-second penalties. This would have allowed Trulli to inherit the win, but he was disqualified for an underweight car and Koide claimed the win. Trulli bounced back from his disqualification to win race three lights-to-flag. Taira finished second after keeping Kimura behind, thereby extending his championship lead to six points. By now, the top pair had distanced themselves by over thirty points from the rest of the field.

Okayama hosted the penultimate round of the season, where Koide and Fraga shared pole positions. The pair started the first race alongside each other, and Koide kept ahead of Fraga as both led Nonaka home. Kimura had a disastrous race and came home last. The second race began with Koide taking the lead from Fraga into the first turn, but panned out much the same afterwards, albeit with Kimura in third this time. The front row for the third race was the same once again, with Koide coming out ahead for the third time. Once again the leading pair remained the same until the end of the race, but third was hotly disputed before B-Max Racing's David Vidales came through to take his maiden podium. Taira had an anonymous weekend, but still grew his advantage to ten points after Kimuras race one non-score. Koide was now only six points further back.

The season final at Motegi began with championship chaser Kimura taking two pole positions. He seemed to be on a mission from the get-go, winning the first race and claiming the fastest lap ahead of Suganami and Fraga. Taira came fourth, now only a single point ahead of Kimura. Race two was much the same, with Kimura again taking the maximum of twelve points. Taira, now relegated to second in the standings, could once again only manage fifth place. This time, Fraga came second and Koide rounded up the podium. Kimura's run slowed in the third race where he had to relinquish the victory to Suganami after the latter made a strong start. But with Taira once again finishing behind him in third, Kimura secured his title eleven points in the lead.

Both Kimura and Taira looked on course to win the title during different stages of the season, with Taira the strongest during the middle part and Kimura clearly the fastest at the start and at the end. This led to a battle that throughout the season could have been a three-way fight had Koide's sudden surge of pace come a bit earlier and held on for a bit longer. Three drivers switching from racing in Europe to Japan made for a renewed international spotlight on the series. Sadly, this did not translate into more cars competing, with the field still consisting of around twelve regular entries, as it did in years past. The series will cease to be a multi-engine championship in 2024. It remains to be seen if this will prove effective in bringing down costs and thereby attracting more entries.

== Championship standings ==
The points were awarded as follows:

1	2	3	4	5	6	PP	FL
10	7	5	3	2	1	**1**	1

=== Drivers' championships ===
==== Overall ====
Pos	Driver	AUT			SUG			SUZ			FUJ			OKA			MOT			Points
Pos	Driver	R1	R2	R3	R4	R5	R6	R7	R8	R9	R10	R11	R12	R13	R14	R15	R16	R17	R18	Points
1	(Japan) Iori Kimura	**1**	**1**	1	3	2	8	11	**1**	5	6	2	3	11	3	6	**1**	**1**	2	113
2	(Japan) Hibiki Taira	2	6	2	**1**	**1**	12	**2**	2	1	3	**3**	2	5	4	4	4	5	3	102
3	(Japan) Syun Koide	5	2	5	4	3	3	4	5	6	4	1	7	**1**	1	1	7	3	8	81
4	(Brazil) Igor Omura Fraga	Ret	4	7	2	6	1	Ret	9	7	8	4	8	2	**2**	2	3	2	4	62
5	(Italy) Enzo Trulli	7	7	6	5	4	2	5	7	4	**1**	DSQ	1	7	Ret	5	8	6	6	44
6	(Japan) Togo Suganami							1	8	2	5	7	5				2	11	1	39
7	(Japan) Seita Nonaka	6	5	10	6	9	4	3	3	3	7	6	9	3	5	Ret	5	4	7	36
8	(Japan) Yuga Furutani	3	3	3	Ret	8	7	7	4	8	9	Ret	6	6	6	7	6	8	5	24
9	(Spain) David Vidales	4	Ret	4	11	5	6	6	6	10	Ret	10	10	4	7	3	DNS	WD	WD	19
10	(Japan) Yuui Tsutsumi	8	8	8	7	7	5	9	10	9	2	5	4							14
11	(Japan) Sota Ogawa																9	7	9	0
12	(Japan) Nobuhiro Imada	9	10	11	8	10	11				10	8	11	8	9	8	10	9	10	0
13	(Japan) "Dragon"	10	9	9	9	11	9	10	12	12	11	9	12	9	8	9	11	10	11	0
14	(Japan) Takashi Hata	11	DNS	DNS	10	Ret	10	8	11	11				10	10	10				0
Pos	Driver	R1	R2	R3	R4	R5	R6	R7	R8	R9	R10	R11	R12	R13	R14	R15	R16	R17	R18	Points
Pos	Driver	AUT			SUG			SUZ			FUJ			OKA			MOT			Points

Key
Colour	Result
Gold	Winner
Silver	Second place
Bronze	Third place
Green	Other points position
Blue	Other classified position
Blue	Not classified, finished (NC)
Purple	Not classified, retired (Ret)
Red	Did not qualify (DNQ)
Red	Did not pre-qualify (DNPQ)
Black	Disqualified (DSQ)
White	Did not start (DNS)
White	Race cancelled (C)
Blank	Did not practice (DNP)
Blank	Excluded (EX)
Blank	Did not arrive (DNA)
Blank	Withdrawn (WD)
Blank	Did not enter (cell empty)
Text formatting	Meaning
**Bold**	Pole position
Italics	Fastest lap

==== Masters' Class ====
Pos	Driver	AUT			SUG			SUZ			FUJ			OKA			MOT			Points
Pos	Driver	R1	R2	R3	R4	R5	R6	R7	R8	R9	R10	R11	R12	R13	R14	R15	R16	R17	R18	Points
1	(Japan) Nobuhiro Imada	**1**	2	2	**1**	**1**	3				**1**	**1**	1	1	2	1	**1**	**1**	1	150
2	(Japan) "Dragon" (Note: "Dragon" entered round 3 as a normal competitor, but all other rounds as a Masters' Class competitor.)	2	**1**	1	2	2	1				2	2	2	**2**	**1**	2	2	2	2	127
3	(Japan) Takashi Hata	3	DNS	DNS	3	Ret	2	**1**	**1**	1				3	3	3				68
Pos	Driver	R1	R2	R3	R4	R5	R6	R7	R8	R9	R10	R11	R12	R13	R14	R15	R16	R17	R18	Points
Pos	Driver	AUT			SUG			SUZ			FUJ			OKA			MOT			Points

=== Teams' standings ===
Only a teams' best finishing driver was eligible for points.

Pos	Driver	AUT			SUG			SUZ			FUJ			OKA			MOT			Points
Pos	Driver	R1	R2	R3	R4	R5	R6	R7	R8	R9	R10	R11	R12	R13	R14	R15	R16	R17	R18	Points
1	B-Max Racing Team	1	1	1	2	2	1	1	1	2	5	3	3	2	2	2	1	1	1	146
2	TOM'S	2	3	2	1	1	2	2	2	1	1	3	1	3	4	4	4	4	3	117
3	Toda Racing	5	2	5	4	3	3	4	5	6	4	1	7	1	1	1	7	3	8	78
4	Rn-sports	8	8	8	7	7	5	9	10	10	2	5	4				9	7	9	14
Pos	Driver	R1	R2	R3	R4	R5	R6	R7	R8	R9	R10	R11	R12	R13	R14	R15	R16	R17	R18	Points
Pos	Driver	AUT			SUG			SUZ			FUJ			OKA			MOT			Points

=== Engine manufacturer standings ===
Only an engine manufacturers' best finishing driver was eligible for points.

Pos	Driver	AUT			SUG			SUZ			FUJ			OKA			MOT			Points
Pos	Driver	R1	R2	R3	R4	R5	R6	R7	R8	R9	R10	R11	R12	R13	R14	R15	R16	R17	R18	Points
1	Siegfried Spiess Motorenbau	1	1	1	2	2	1	1	1	2	2	1	3	1	1	1	1	1	1	163
2	TOM'S	2	3	2	1	1	2	2	2	1	1	3	1	3	4	4	4	4	3	117
3	Tomei Engine	10	9	9	9	11	9	9	12	12	11	9	12	9	8	9	11	11	11	0
Pos	Driver	R1	R2	R3	R4	R5	R6	R7	R8	R9	R10	R11	R12	R13	R14	R15	R16	R17	R18	Points
Pos	Driver	AUT			SUG			SUZ			FUJ			OKA			MOT			Points
