= Iori Kimura =

Japanese racing driver (born 1999)

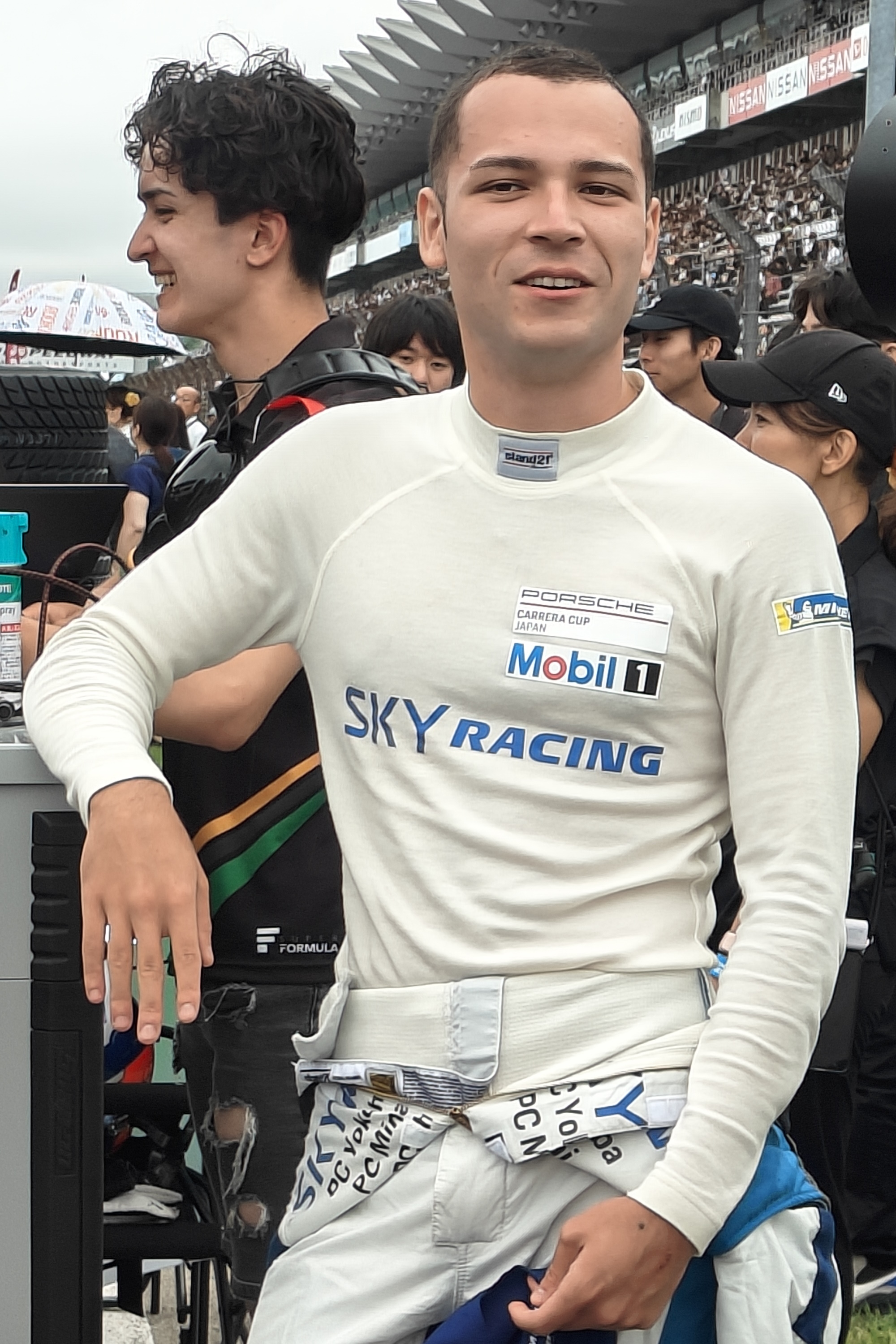
- Kimura in 2026
- Nationality: (Japan) Japanese
- Born: 22 June 1999 (age 27) Setagaya, Tokyo, Japan

Super GT - GT300 career
- Debut season: 2022
- Current team: Kondo Racing
- Car number: 56
- Former teams: ARTA, Team Mach
- Starts: 16
- Wins: 2
- Podiums: 3
- Poles: 1
- Fastest laps: 0
- Best finish: 1st in 2026

Previous series
- 2024 2023 2022–2023 2019–2021 2017: Super Formula; Super GT - GT500; Super Formula Lights; Formula 4 Japan; Asian Formula Renault Series

Championship titles
- 2025 2023 2026: Porsche Carrera Cup Japan; Super Formula Lights; Super GT

Iori Kimura (木村偉織, Kimura Iori; born 22 June 1999) is a Japanese racing driver who currently competes in Super GT for Kondo Racing. A former member of the Honda Formula Dream Project, Kimura previously competed in Super Formula in 2024, and was champion of the 2023 Super Formula Lights and 2025 Porsche Carrera Cup Japan. He won the 2026 Super GT Series in GT300 class alongside João Paulo de Oliveira.

== Career ==
=== Early career ===
Kimura started professional racing in 2016, competed in Asian Le Mans Sprint Cup. Then in 2017, Kimura raced in Asian Formula Renault Series Class B with PS Racing, however for one round only. He raced again in 2019 to compete in F4 Japanese Championship, where he finished ninth overall. In 2020, Kimura was supposed to race again in Japanese F4 with new team Honda Formula Dream Project, but due to the COVID-19 pandemic, the team withdrew from that year of competition. After one year not racing, Kimura returned to compete in 2021 F4 Japanese Championship with HFDP. In that season, he managed to clinch third place, losing out to the champion Seita Nonaka & runner-up Rin Arakawa.

=== Super Formula Lights ===
In 2022, Kimura was promoted to Super Formula Lights race with B-Max Racing Kimura managed to get three wins that season, and six podiums. With that, he managed to reach third in the season behind Kakunoshin Ohta. Kimura raced with the same team for 2023. He won the title over Hibiki Taira after taking his sixth win of the season at the final round at Motegi.

=== Super GT ===
Kimura also competed in the GT300 class of Super GT for ARTA alongside Hideki Mutoh. Both of them managed to win the last race of the season at Motegi, and that win was the last for the team as ARTA focused on GT500 for 2023. Kimura initially did not race in Super GT in 2023, but became a third driver for ARTA at the second Fuji round, making his GT500 debut after an injured Toshiki Oyu was still recovering from a broken collarbone. Kimura also raced in GT500 with Team Kunimitsu after Naoki Yamamoto suffered a massive crash at Sportsland SUGO, and was unable to compete in the final 2 races of the season. Kimura finished 17th in the standings, with three points, all achieved with Team Kunimitsu.

After parted ways with Honda at the end of 2024 season, Kimura joined Team Mach alongside Yusuke Shiotsu driving the Toyota 86 Mother Chassis. The pair claimed a third place finish following a disqualification of the second-placed LM Corsa LC500 giving the team it's first podium since 2022. They give the team it's first win at the final round of the season in Motegi giving Kimura his first win in GT300 class since 2022 at the same venue. Kimura and Shiotsu finished the season 8th in standings.

For 2026, Kimura joined Kondo Racing alongside João Paulo de Oliveira driving Nissan GT-R GT3. Kimura have previously raced the GT-R in Super Taikyu the previous year. Kimura and Oliveira would score points at every round including a win at Fuji and a second-placed finish at Sugo after gambling on not changing tires. Fourth placed finish in season finale at Motegi secures them the GT300 title.

=== Super Formula ===
In 2024, Kimura stepped up to Super Formula with B-Max Racing Team's single car.

== Racing record ==
=== Career summary ===
Season	Series	Team	Races	Wins	Poles	FLaps	Podiums	Points	Position
2016	Asian Le Mans Sprint Cup - CN	PS Racing	4	3	2	3	3	N/A	NC
2017	Asian Formula Renault Series - Class B	PS Racing	2	0	0	0	1	31	10th
2019	F4 Japanese Championship	Silver Star Racing	14	0	0	0	1	69	9th
2021	F4 Japanese Championship	Honda Formula Dream Project	14	4	3	1	7	191	**3rd**
2022	Super Formula Lights	B-Max Racing Team	18	3	2	6	9	85	**3rd**
2022	Super GT - GT300	ARTA	8	1	1	0	1	26	12th
2022	Super Taikyu - ST-Z	Team 5Zigen	1	1	1	0	1	131.5‡	**1st‡**
2023	Super Formula Lights	B-Max Racing Team	18	6	4	8	12	113	**1st**
2023	Super GT - GT500	ARTA	1	0	0	0	0	3	17th
2023	Super GT - GT500	Team Kunimitsu	2	0	0	0	0	3	17th
2024	Super Formula	San-Ei Gen with B-Max	9	0	0	1	0	3	16th
2025	Porsche Carrera Cup Japan	Sky Racing	11	3	2	0	10	220	**1st**
2025	Super GT - GT300	Team Mach	8	1	0	0	2	67	8th
2025	Super Taikyu - ST-X	GTNET MotorSports	1	0	0	0	0	26‡	7th‡
2026	Super GT - GT300	Kondo Racing	8	1	0	0	2	88	**1st**
2026	Porsche Carrera Cup Japan	Sky Racing	11	1	1	0	8	167	**2nd**
2026	Super Taikyu - ST-X	GTNET MotorSports							

‡ Team standings

=== Complete F4 Japanese Championship results ===
(key) (Races in bold indicate pole position; races in italics indicate points for the fastest lap of top ten finishers)

Year	Team	1	2	3	4	5	6	7	8	9	10	11	12	13	14	DC	Points
2019	Silver Star Racing	OKA; 1; 7	OKA; 2; 4	FUJ1; 1; 13	FUJ1; 2; 12	SUZ; 1; 13	SUZ; 2; 9	FUJ2; 1 Ret	FUJ2; 2; 7	AUT; 1; 6	AUT; 2; 5	SUG; 1 Ret	SUG; 2; 23	MOT; 1; 3	MOT; 2; 5	9th	69
2021	Honda Formula Dream Project	**FUJ1**; **1**; 1	FUJ1; 2; 25	**SUZ**; **1**; 1	**SUZ**; **2**; 5	MOT1; 1; 5	MOT1; 2; 2	MOT1; 3; 7	SUG; 1; 2	**SUG**; **2**; 1	SUG; 3; 26	MOT2; 1; 1	MOT2; 2; 9	FUJ2; 1; 4	FUJ2; 2; 3	3rd	191

=== Complete Super Formula Lights results ===
(key) (Races in bold indicate pole position) (Races in italics indicate fastest lap)

Year	Entrant	1	2	3	4	5	6	7	8	9	10	11	12	13	14	15	16	17	18	Pos	Points
2022	B-Max Racing Team	FUJ; 1; 2	FUJ; 2; 6	FUJ; 3; 2	SUZ; 1; 5	SUZ; 2; 5	SUZ; 3; 7	AUT; 1; 1	AUT; 2; 8	AUT; 3; 1	SUG; 1 Ret	SUG; 2; 5	SUG; 3; 6	**MOT**; **1**; 3	MOT; 2 Ret	MOT; 3; 1	OKA; 1; 2	**OKA**; **2**; 2	OKA; 3; 2	3rd	86
2023	B-Max Racing Team	**AUT**; **1**; 1	**AUT**; **2**; 1	AUT; 3; 1	SUG; 1; 3	SUG; 2; 2	SUG; 3; 8	SUZ; 1; 11	**SUZ**; **2**; 1	SUZ; 3; 5	FUJ; 1; 6	FUJ; 2; 2	FUJ; 3; 3	OKA; 1; 11	OKA; 2; 3	OKA; 3; 6	**MOT**; **1**; 1	**MOT**; **2**; 1	MOT; 3; 2	1st	113

=== Complete Super GT results ===
Year	Team	Car	Class	1	2	3	4	5	6	7	8	9	DC	Points
2022	ARTA	Honda NSX GT3 Evo2	GT300	OKA; 15	FUJ; Ret	SUZ; 10	FUJ; Ret	SUZ; 24	SUG; 7	AUT; 18	**MOT**; 1		12th	26
2023	ARTA	Honda NSX-GT	GT500	OKA	FUJ	SUZ	FUJ; 14	SUZ	SUG				17th	3
2023	Team Kunimitsu	Honda NSX-GT	GT500							AUT; 9	MOT; 10		17th	3
2025	Team Mach	Toyota 86 MC	GT300	OKA; 16	FUJ; 10	SEP	FS1 (7)	FS2; 4	SUZ; 3	SUG; 9	AUT; 14	MOT; 1	8th	67
2026	Kondo Racing	Nissan GT-R Nismo GT3	GT300	OKA; 14	FUJ; 1	FUJ; 5	SUZ; 5	SUG; 2	AUT; 14	MOT; 14	MOT; 4		1st	88

=== Complete Super Formula results ===
(key) (Races in bold indicate pole position) (Races in italics indicate fastest lap)

Year	Team	Engine	1	2	3	4	5	6	7	8	9	DC	Points
2024	San-Ei Gen with B-Max	Honda	SUZ; 12	AUT; 14	SUG; 9	FUJ; 15	MOT; 17	FUJ; Ret	FUJ; 9	SUZ; 11	SUZ; 11	16th	3

Sporting positions
Preceded by Kazuto Kotaka	Super Formula Lights; Champion; 2023	Succeeded by Syun Koide
