= Hibiki Taira =

Japanese racing driver

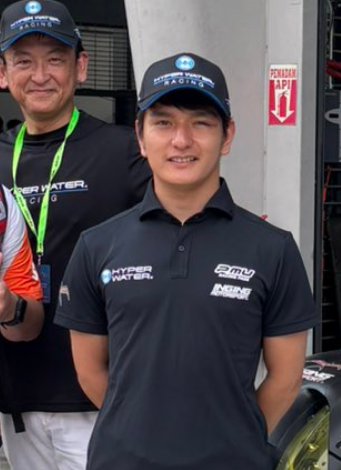
- Taira at the 2025 Super GT Malaysia Festival
- Nationality: (Japan) Japanese
- Born: 11 June 2000 (age 26) Okinawa, Okinawa Prefecture, Japan

Super Formula Championship career
- Debut season: 2024
- Current team: TGMGP
- Car number: 29
- Former teams: Team Impul
- Starts: 9
- Wins: 0
- Podiums: 0
- Poles: 0
- Fastest laps: 0
- Best finish: 17th in 2024

Super GT Series - GT300 career
- Debut season: 2020
- Current team: apr
- Car number: 30
- Former teams: K-tunes Racing, Hyper Water Racing Inging
- Starts: 30
- Wins: 1
- Podiums: 10
- Poles: 3
- Fastest laps: 2
- Best finish: 2nd in 2023

Previous series
- 2021–2024 2019–2020 2017–18: Super Formula Lights; F4 Japanese Championship; Formula 4 South East Asia Championship

Championship titles
- 2020 2022 2023: F4 Japanese Championship; Super Taikyū - ST-2; Super Taikyū - ST-X

Hibiki Taira (平良響, Taira Hibiki; born 11 July 2000) is a Japanese racing driver who most recently competed in Super GT for Hyper Water Racing Inging and in Super Formula for TGMGP. He is the champion of the 2020 F4 Japanese Championship, as well as a two-time class winner in the Super Taikyū Series. He is part of the TGR Driver Challenge Program.

== Early career ==
=== Karting ===
Taira began his karting career in 2009, and became champion in the Okinawa series the following year. He would remain at prefectural level competition until its cancellation in 2014 and travelled annually to compete in the national Rotax Max Challenge, claiming a best finish of eighth. In 2015, Taira made his international karting debut at the Rotax Max Grand Finals at the Algarve International Circuit, where he impressed against the likes of Caio Collet but crashed out in the grand final. Taira's karting career concluded in 2018 after two years racing in the All-Japan Karting Championship.

=== Formula 4 ===
After making his formula racing debut by invitation in the final two rounds of the Formula 4 South East Asia championship in 2018, Taira began his first full season for Formula 4 in 2019, racing in the F4 Japanese Championship with TOM'S Spirit. He would go on to finish seventh in the standings, taking one podium. The following year, Taira remained in the series after gaining official junior status, graduating from the TGR-DC Racing School and joining its namesake team. He would go on to win the championship in a crushingly dominant fashion, consecutively winning ten out of the twelve races contested that season and taking pole position in all but two qualifying sessions.

=== Super Formula Lights ===
For 2021, Taira was promoted to Super Formula Lights with TOM'S, partnering longtime teammate Seita Nonaka and former Formula 2 driver Giuliano Alesi. He managed to claim fifth in the standings, finishing in the top six in every race, but never higher than third. Taira remained with TOM'S for 2022; despite claiming two race victories, he would finish fifth in the championship once again, one point behind teammate Nonaka. In his third season in the category in 2023, Taira started off strongly and led the championship by the halfway mark after taking three victories, but would ultimately lose out on the championship, finishing runner-up to Honda junior Iori Kimura.

== Super Formula ==
Taira debuted his first Super Formula season in 2024 the following round in Sugo to replace Ben Barnicoat at Team Impul, and returned for his second race at Fuji in July. Taira would return to finish out the season in the JAF Suzuka Grand Prix double-header.

Taira would make his full season debut in 2025 with TGMGP along with Kazuto Kotaka.

== Super GT ==
=== GT300 ===
Taira made his sports car racing debut in Super GT for the 2021 season, racing for K-Tunes Racing in the GT300 class alongside series veteran Morio Nitta as a stand-in for Sena Sakaguchi. He continued his role as a replacement driver in 2022, competing for apr in three rounds in place of Hiroaki Nagai. Taira began his first full season in Super GT in 2023, driving a Toyota GR86 GT300 for muta Racing INGING alongside Yuui Tsutsumi after Hiroki Katoh stepped back from a full-time driving role, becoming the director of the team. Despite going winless, Taira and Tsutsumi finished in second on three occasions and claimed both pole position and the fastest race lap in the final two rounds of the season, earning enough points to finish second overall in the standings. Taira continued race with the same team and driver pairing for 2024.

== Personal life ==
Taira currently attends Aichi Toho University in Nagoya, studying international business administration.

== Racing record ==
=== Career summary ===
Season	Series	Team	Races	Wins	Poles	FLaps	Podiums	Points	Position
2017–18	Formula 4 South East Asia Championship	Meritus.GP	12	0	0	2	3	127	6th
2019	F4 Japanese Championship	TOM'S Spirit	14	0	0	0	1	101	7th
2020	F4 Japanese Championship	TGR-DC Racing School	12	10	6	4	12	270.5	**1st**
2021	Super Formula Lights	TOM'S	13	0	0	0	4	41.5	5th
2021	Super GT - GT300	K-tunes Racing	3	0	0	0	0	5	24th
2021	Super Taikyū - ST-2	Kobe Toyopet Motor Sports	6	4	0	1	4	100‡	**3rd‡**
2022	Super Formula Lights	TOM'S	18	2	0	1	6	62	5th
2022	Super GT - GT300	apr	3	0	0	0	1	11	22nd
2022	Super Taikyū - ST-2	KTMS Kobe Toyopet Motor Sports	6	5	0	1	6	173‡	**1st‡**
2023	Super GT - GT300	muta Racing INGING	8	0	2	2	3	53	**2nd**
2023	Super Formula Lights	TOM'S	18	3	4	4	11	102	**2nd**
2023	Super Taikyū - ST-X	Zhongsheng ROOKIE Racing	7	3	2	1	5	136‡	**1st‡**
2023	TGR GR86/BRZ Cup	Nine with ARN Racing	6	0	1	0	2	36	7th
2024	Super GT - GT300	muta Racing INGING	8	1	0	0	4	80	**3rd**
2024	Super Formula	Itochu Enex Team Impul	4	0	0	0	0	2	17th
2024	Nürburgring Langstrecken-Serie - SP10	Toyota Gazoo Racing	2	0	0	0	0	(3)*	NC*
2024	Super Taikyu - ST-Z	2W Zoomies x GR Garage Yamaguchi-Shunan	1	0	0	0	0	41.5‡	11th‡
2024	Super Taikyu - ST-2	KTMS	1	0	0	0	0	118‡	**1st‡**
2024	TGR GR86/BRZ Cup	KTMS	5	0	0	0	0	1	20th
2025	Super GT - GT300	Hyper Water Racing INGING	8	0	0	0	1	63.5	10th
2025	Super Formula	KDDI TGMGP TGR-DC	5	0	0	0	0	0	22nd
2025	Super Taikyū - ST-2	KTMS	6	3	0	0	5	118‡	**2nd‡**
2025	TGR GR86/BRZ Cup	Okinawa Dream Racing	7	0	0	0	0	4	19th
2026	Super GT - GT300	apr							
2026	Super Taikyu - ST-Z	Saitama Green Brave							
2026	TGR GR86/BRZ Cup	Okinawa Dream Racing							

^{*} Season still in progress.
‡ Team standings

=== Complete Formula 4 South East Asia Championship results ===
(key) (Races in bold indicate pole position; races in italics indicate points for the fastest lap of top ten finishers)

Year	1	2	3	4	5	6	7	8	9	10	11	12	13	14	15	16	17	18	19	20	21	22	23	24	25	26	27	28	29	30	DC	Points
2017–18	SEP1; 1	SEP1; 2	SEP1; 3	SEP1; 4	SEP1; 5	SEP1; 6	CLA; 1	CLA; 2	CLA; 3	CLA; 4	CLA; 5	CLA; 6	CHA; 1	CHA; 2	CHA; 3	CHA; 4	CHA; 5	CHA; 6	SEP2; 1; 5	SEP2; 2; 2	SEP2; 3 Ret	SEP2; 4; 4	SEP2; 5; 2	SEP2; 6; 2	SEP3; 1; 5	SEP3; 2; 8	SEP3; 3; 7	SEP3; 4; 4	SEP3; 5; 8	SEP3; 6; 5	6th	127

=== Complete F4 Japanese Championship results ===
(key) (Races in bold indicate pole position; races in italics indicate points for the fastest lap of top ten finishers)

Year	Team	1	2	3	4	5	6	7	8	9	10	11	12	13	14	DC	Points
2019	TOM'S Spirit	OKA; 1; 4	OKA; 2; 8	FUJ1; 1; 7	FUJ1; 2; 4	SUZ; 1; 5	SUZ; 2; 5	FUJ2; 1; 23	FUJ2; 2; 4	AUT; 1; 12	AUT; 2; 32	SUG; 1; 5	SUG; 2; 3	MOT; 1; 5	MOT; 2 Ret	7th	101
2020	TGR-DC Racing School	FUJ1; 1; 3	**FUJ1**; **2**; 1	FUJ1; 3; 1	**SUZ**; **1**; 1	**SUZ**; **2**; 1	SUZ; 3; 1	**MOT**; **1**; 1	**MOT**; **2**; 1	MOT; 3; 1	FUJ2; 1; 1	**FUJ2**; **2**; 1	FUJ2; 3; 2			1st	270.5

=== Complete Super Formula Lights results ===
(key) (Races in bold indicate pole position) (Races in italics indicate fastest lap)

Year	Entrant	1	2	3	4	5	6	7	8	9	10	11	12	13	14	15	16	17	18	Pos	Points
2021	TOM'S	FUJ; 1; 4	FUJ; 2 DNS	FUJ; 3; 4	SUZ; 1; 5	SUZ; 2; 4	SUZ; 3; 3	AUT; 1; 4	AUT; 2; 4	AUT; 3 C	SUG; 1; 3	SUG; 2; 3	SUG; 3; 3	MOT; 1 WD	MOT; 2 WD	MOT; 3 WD	MOT; 1; 6	MOT; 2; 4	MOT; 3; 5	5th	41.5
2022	TOM'S	FUJ; 1; 3	FUJ; 2; 3	FUJ; 3; 1	SUZ; 1; 7	SUZ; 2; 4	SUZ; 3; 5	AUT; 1; 4	AUT; 2 Ret	AUT; 3; 5	SUG; 1; 2	SUG; 2; 4	SUG; 3; 2	MOT; 1; 10	MOT; 2; 1	MOT; 3; 7	OKA; 1; 6	OKA; 2; 6	OKA; 3; 5	5th	62
2023	TOM'S	AUT; 1; 2	AUT; 2; 6	AUT; 3; 2	**SUG**; **1**; 1	**SUG**; **2**; 1	SUG; 3; 12	**SUZ**; **1**; 2	SUZ; 2; 2	SUZ; 3; 1	FUJ; 1; 3	**FUJ**; **2**; 3	FUJ; 3; 2	OKA; 1; 5	OKA; 2; 4	OKA; 3; 4	MOT; 1; 4	MOT; 2; 5	MOT; 3; 3	2nd	102

=== Complete Super GT results ===
(key) (Races in bold indicate pole position; races in italics indicate fastest lap)

Year	Team	Car	Class	1	2	3	4	5	6	7	8	9	DC	Points
2021	K-tunes Racing	Lexus RC F GT3	GT300	OKA; 6	FUJ; 14	MOT; 13	SUZ	SUG	AUT	MOT	FUJ		25th	4
2022	apr	Toyota GR86 GT300	GT300	OKA	FUJ; 18	SUZ	FUJ; 15	SUZ; 3	SUG	AUT	MOT		22nd	11
2023	muta Racing INGING	Toyota GR86 GT300	GT300	OKA; 18	FUJ; 2	SUZ; 2	FUJ; 11	SUZ; 7	SUG; Ret	**AUT**; 2	**MOT**; 9		2nd	53
2024	muta Racing INGING	Toyota GR86 GT300	GT300	OKA; 1^{2}	FUJ; 6	SUZ; 2^{3}	FUJ; 8	SUG; 8	AUT; 2	MOT; 13	SUZ; 2^{3}		3rd	80
2025	Hyper Water Racing INGING	Toyota GR86 GT300	GT300	OKA; 10	FUJ; 3	SEP; 5	**FS1**; 6	FS2 (2)	SUZ; 12	SUG; Ret	AUT; 12	MOT; 9	10th	63.5
2026	apr	Toyota GR86 GT300	GT300	OKA; 22	FUJ; 21	FUJ; 21	SUZ; 12	SUG; Ret	AUT; 19	MOT; Ret	MOT; 25		40th	4

^{‡} Half points awarded as less than 75% of race distance was completed.
^{(Number)} Driver did not take part in this sprint race, points are still awarded for the teammate's result.
^{*} Season still in progress.

=== Complete Super Formula results ===
Year	Team	Engine	1	2	3	4	5	6	7	8	9	10	11	12	DC	Points
2024	Itochu Enex Team Impul	Toyota	SUZ	AUT	SUG; 17	FUJ; 9	MOT	FUJ	FUJ	SUZ; Ret	SUZ; 17				17th	2
2025	KDDI TGMGP TGR-DC	Toyota	SUZ; 15	SUZ; 17	MOT; 13	MOT; Ret	AUT; 16	FUJ	FUJ	SUG	FUJ	SUZ	SUZ	SUZ	22nd	0

^{*} Season still in progress.

Sporting positions
Preceded by Ren Sato	F4 Japanese Championship; Champion; 2020	Succeeded by Seita Nonaka
