= Seita Nonaka =

Japanese racing driver (born 2000)

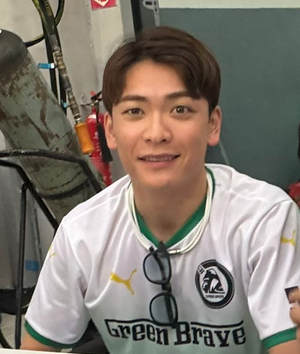
- Nonaka at the 2025 Super GT Malaysia Festival
- Nationality: (Japan) Japanese
- Born: 25 October 2000 (age 26) Saitama, Japan

Super GT - GT300 career
- Debut season: 2022
- Current team: Saitama Green Brave
- Categorisation: FIA Gold
- Car number: 52
- Former teams: Hoppy Team Tsuchiya
- Starts: 27
- Wins: 1
- Podiums: 3
- Poles: 0
- Fastest laps: 0
- Best finish: 7th in 2025

Previous series
- 2021-24 2023 2019-21: Super Formula Lights; GT World Challenge Asia - GT4; F4 Japanese Championship

Championship titles
- 2025 2021: SRO Japan Cup - GT4; F4 Japanese Championship

Seita Nonaka (野中 誠太, Nonaka Seita; born 25 October 2000) is a Japanese racing driver set to compete in Super GT for Saitama Green Brave, and in Super Formula for team KCMG. He previously raced in Super Formula Lights, and was most notably the 2021 Japanese F4 champion. Nonaka is part of the TGR Driver Challenge program.

== Career ==
=== F4 Japan ===
Nonaka started racing in 2019, competing in F4 Japanese Championship with TOM'S Spirit and managed to claim eighth in his rookie season. He stayed in the same series, but joined TGR-DC Racing School. In that season, he claimed third place in the final standings. Nonaka once again continued to compete in the same series for the third season for 2021 with the same team from 2020. That season, he clinched the title from Rin Arakawa & Iori Kimura in the last round at Fuji Speedway.

=== Super Formula Lights ===
In the same year of 2021, Nonaka competed in Super Formula Lights, where he replaced Kazuto Kotaka who originally should compete in the series, but have to race in Super Formula with KCMG covered Kamui Kobayashi, who was not able to compete in Japan due to travel restrictions. Nonaka competed all but one of the six rounds held that year.

For the next two seasons, Nonaka continued racing Super Formula Lights with the same team, claiming a win and nine podiums. He finished the year in fourth place in 2022, and finished seventh with four podiums in 2023. He continued the series for the third season with TOM'S again. Nonaka stayed for his fourth season in 2024, once again with TOM'S.

=== Super Formula Championship ===
For 2026, Nonaka was due to stay in Super Formula Lights for yet another season, however, he was promoted to the KCMG team in the Super Formula Championship, following the withdrawal of Kalle Rovanperä for the season due to a medical issue. Nonaka will drive car No. 9, and his team-mate will be Kenta Yamashita.

=== Super GT ===
Nonaka makes his Super GT GT300 debut with Team Tsuchiya with Takashi Matsui partnering him. He continued racing with the same team, but with new partner Togo Suganami. Unfortunately, he only managed to race for four rounds, as the last round he did at Fuji Speedway, his car caught on fire and burned badly and Nonaka safely out from the incident. Nonaka joined Saitama Toyopet GreenBrave as a third driver. He won the race but did not take a single lap thus was not classified for points. In 2024, Nonaka was promoted to full-time seat with 2023 GT300 champion team Saitama Green Brave, as he replaced Kohta Kawaai.

=== Other series ===
In 2023, Nonaka raced in GT World Challenge Asia with Toyota Gazoo Racing Indonesia. He claimed 5 wins from 6 races. Nonaka stayed with the team for SRO Japan Cup for two seasons in 2024 and 2025.

== Racing record ==
=== Career summary ===
Season	Series	Team	Races	Wins	Poles	FLaps	Podiums	Points	Position
2019	F4 Japanese Championship	TOM'S Spirit	14	0	0	1	2	89	8th
2020	F4 Japanese Championship	TGR-DC Racing School	12	0	0	0	5	123	**3rd**
2021	F4 Japanese Championship	TGR-DC Racing School	14	6	1	5	8	217	**1st**
2021	Super Formula Lights	TOM'S	14	0	0	0	3	24	7th
2021	Super Taikyu - ST-2	Kobe Toyopet Motor Sports	6	4	0	1	4	100‡	**3rd‡**
2022	Super Formula Lights	TOM'S	18	1	0	1	9	63	4th
2022	Super GT - GT300	Hoppy Team Tsuchiya	7	0	0	0	0	1	34th
2022	Super Taikyu - ST-Z	Corolla Shin-Ibaraki CSIRacing	5	1	1	1	2	107‡	**3rd‡**
2022	Super Taikyu - ST-Z	My Cars CSIRacing	2	0	0	0	2	107‡	**3rd‡**
2023	GT World Challenge Asia - GT4	Toyota Gazoo Racing Indonesia	6	5	4	4	6	143	**2nd**
2023	Super Formula Lights	TOM'S	18	0	0	1	4	36	7th
2023	Super GT - GT300	Hoppy Team Tsuchiya	4	0	0	0	0	1	25th
2023	Super GT - GT300	Saitama Toyopet GreenBrave	1	1	0	0	1	1	25th
2023	Super Taikyu - ST-Z	Saitama Toyopet GreenBrave	6	1	1	0	1	174‡	**1st‡**
2024	Super Formula Lights	TOM'S	18	5	1	5	7	77	**3rd**
2024	SRO Japan Cup - GT4	Toyota Gazoo Racing Indonesia	6	1	4	?	5	103	6th
2024	Super GT - GT300	Saitama Green Brave	8	0	0	0	1	29	9th
2024	Super Taikyu - ST-Z	Saitama Green Brave	7	2	1	0	4	128‡	**1st‡**
2024	Nürburgring Langstrecken-Serie - SP10	Toyota Gazoo Racing							
2024	TGR GR86/BRZ Cup	Corolla Shin-Ibaraki CSIRacing	1	0	0	0	0	0	NC
2025	SRO Japan Cup - GT4	Toyota Gazoo Racing Indonesia	8	7	7	0	8	193	**1st**
2025	Super GT - GT300	Saitama Green Brave	8	0	0	0	1	70.5	7th
2025	Super Taikyu - ST-Z	Saitama Green Brave	2	1	1	0	2	34‡*	**1st‡***
2025	Super Formula	Itochu Enex Wecars Team Impul	2	0	0	0	0	3	17th
2025	Super Formula	Kids com Team KCMG	2	0	0	0	0	3	17th
2025	Super Formula	KDDI TGMGP TGR-DC	7	0	0	1	0	3	17th
2025	Super Formula Lights	TOM'S	0	0	0	0	0	0	NC
2026	Super GT - GT300	Saitama Green Brave	6	1	0	2	1	40	18th
2026	Super Taikyu - ST-Z	Saitama Green Brave							
2026	Super Formula	KCMG							
2026-27	Asian Le Mans Series - GT3	Ponos Racing							

^{*} Season still in progress.
‡ Team standings

=== Complete F4 Japanese Championship results ===
(key) (Races in bold indicate pole position; races in italics indicate points for the fastest lap of top ten finishers)

Year	Team	1	2	3	4	5	6	7	8	9	10	11	12	13	14	DC	Points
2019	TOM'S Spirit	OKA; 1; 2	OKA; 2; 3	FUJ1; 1; 4	FUJ1; 2; 8	SUZ; 1; 35	SUZ; 2; 7	FUJ2; 1; 29	FUJ2; 2; 11	AUT; 1; 10	AUT; 2; 10	SUG; 1; 7	SUG; 2; 4	MOT; 1; 7	MOT; 2; 6	8th	89
2020	TGR-DC Racing School	FUJ1; 1; 2	FUJ1; 2; 3	FUJ1; 3; 2	SUZ; 1; 3	SUZ; 2; 4	SUZ; 3; 11	MOT; 1; 3	MOT; 2; 6	MOT; 3; 4	FUJ2; 1 Ret	FUJ2; 2; 5	FUJ2; 3; 7			3rd	123
2021	TGR-DC Racing School	FUJ1; 1; 3	FUJ1; 2; 1	SUZ; 1; 28	SUZ; 2; 7	MOT1; 1; 1	**MOT1**; **2**; 1	MOT1; 3; 1	SUG; 1; 5	SUG; 2; 7	SUG; 3; 2	MOT2; 1; 4	MOT2; 2 Ret	FUJ2; 1; 1	FUJ2; 2; 1	1st	217

=== Complete Super Formula Lights results ===
(key) (Races in bold indicate pole position) (Races in italics indicate fastest lap)

Year	Entrant	1	2	3	4	5	6	7	8	9	10	11	12	13	14	15	16	17	18	Pos	Points
2021	TOM'S	FUJ; 1; 10	FUJ; 2; 3	FUJ; 3; 6	SUZ; 1; 3	SUZ; 2; 5	SUZ; 3; 7	AUT; 1 Ret	AUT; 2; 5	AUT; 3 C	SUG; 1; 6	SUG; 2 Ret	SUG; 3; 7	MOT; 1; 5	MOT; 2; 5	MOT; 3; 3	MOT; 1	MOT; 2	MOT; 3	7th	24
2022	TOM'S	FUJ; 1; 1	FUJ; 2; 5	FUJ; 3; 3	SUZ; 1; 3	SUZ; 2; 12	SUZ; 3; 6	AUT; 1; 3	AUT; 2; 3	AUT; 3; 3	SUG; 1; 4	SUG; 2; 6	SUG; 3; 3	MOT; 1; 9	MOT; 2; 2	MOT; 3; 8	OKA; 1; 4	OKA; 2; 7	OKA; 3; 3	4th	63
2023	TOM'S	AUT; 1; 6	AUT; 2; 5	AUT; 3; 10	SUG; 1; 6	SUG; 2; 9	SUG; 3; 4	SUZ; 1; 3	SUZ; 2; 3	SUZ; 3; 3	FUJ; 1; 7	FUJ; 2; 6	FUJ; 3; 9	OKA; 1; 3	OKA; 2; 5	OKA; 3 Ret	MOT; 1; 5	MOT; 2; 4	MOT; 3; 7	7th	36
2024	TOM'S	AUT; 1; 1	AUT; 2; 3	AUT; 3; 1	SUG; 1; 4	SUG; 2; 7	SUG; 3; 1	FUJ; 1; 7	FUJ; 2; 4	FUJ; 3; 3	OKA; 1; 4	OKA; 2 Ret	OKA; 3; 4	**SUZ**; **1**; 1	SUZ; 2; 4	SUZ; 3; 1	MOT; 1 Ret	MOT; 2; 8	MOT; 3; 6	3rd	77
2025	TOM'S	SUZ; 1 WD	SUZ; 2 WD	SUZ; 3 WD	AUT; 1	AUT; 2	AUT; 3	OKA; 1	OKA; 2	OKA; 3	SUG; 1	SUG; 2	SUG; 3	FUJ; 1	FUJ; 2	FUJ; 3	MOT; 1	MOT; 2	MOT; 3	NC	0

=== Complete Super GT Results ===
Year	Team	Car	Class	1	2	3	4	5	6	7	8	9	DC	Pts
2022	Hoppy Team Tsuchiya	Toyota GR Supra GT300	GT300	OKA; 22	FUJ; 11	SUZ; Ret	FUJ	SUZ; 15	SUG; 10	AUT; 16	MOT; Ret		34th	1
2023	Hoppy Team Tsuchiya	Toyota GR Supra GT300	GT300	OKA; 12	FUJ; 10	SUZ; 17	FUJ; Ret	SUZ	SUG				25th	1
2023	Saitama Toyopet GreenBrave	Toyota GR Supra GT300	GT300							AUT; 1	MOT		25th	1
2024	Saitama Green Brave	Toyota GR Supra GT300	GT300	OKA; 4	FUJ; 3	SUZ; 5	FUJ; 23	SUG; DNS	AUT; 18	MOT; 7	SUZ; 11		9th	29
2025	Saitama Green Brave	Toyota GR Supra GT300	GT300	OKA; Ret	FUJ; 26	SEP; 2	FS1 (5)	FS2; 6	SUZ; 6	SUG; 6	AUT; 7	MOT; 5	7th	70.5
2026	Saitama Green Brave	Toyota GR Supra GT300	GT300	OKA; 8	FUJ; 9	FUJ; 1	SUZ; 27†	SUG; 20	AUT; Ret	MOT; WD	MOT; WD		18th	40

=== Complete Super Formula results ===
(key) (Races in bold indicate pole position) (Races in italics indicate fastest lap)

Year	Team	Engine	1	2	3	4	5	6	7	8	9	10	11	12	DC	Points
2025	Itochu Enex Wecars Team Impul	Toyota	SUZ; 17	SUZ; 19											17th	3
2025	Kids com Team KCMG	Toyota			MOT; 11	MOT; 8	AUT								17th	3
2025	KDDI TGMGP TGR-DC	Toyota						FUJ; 19	FUJ; Ret	SUG; 16	FUJ; 18	SUZ; 16	SUZ; 18	SUZ; Ret	17th	3
2026	KCMG	Toyota	MOT	MOT	AUT	SUZ	SUZ	FUJ	FUJ	SUG	FUJ	FUJ	SUZ	SUZ		

^{*} Season still in progress.

Sporting positions
Preceded by Hibiki Taira	F4 Japanese Championship; Champion; 2021	Succeeded by Syun Koide
