= LM corsa =

Japanese racing team

OTG Motor Sports
- Founded: 2014
- Base: Osaka Prefecture
- Team principal(s): Akira Iida
- Current series: LM Corsa: Super GT - GT300; GT World Challenge Asia; Super Formula Lights; OTG Motor Sports: F4 Japanese Championship
- Current drivers: LM Corsa: Super GT - GT300: Hiroki Yoshimoto; Shunsuke Kohno; GT World Challenge Asia-Japan Cup: Shigekazu Wakisaka; Ryo Ogawa; Kei Nakanishi; OTG Motor Sports: F4 Japanese: Kenta Kumagai
- Website: www.osaka-toyopet.jp/otg-ms/

LM corsa is a racing team based in Osaka Prefecture and the team is run by Osaka Toyopet Group's OTG Motor Sports.

== History ==
=== OTG Motor Sports ===
Osaka Toyopet, is a company who runs Toyota car dealer in Osaka founded OTG Motor Sports. The team runs Super GT GT300 under the LM Corsa guise. OTG also competes in F4 Japanese Championship since 2017. In their first two seasons, with Togo Suganami as their driver, the team won two races. From 2020 until the present day, the team has run Reimei Ito, Yuto Nozawa and currently Kenta Kumagai.

=== LM Corsa ===
==== Super GT GT300 ====
In 2014, OTG Motor Sports entered the Super GT GT300 Class under the LM Corsa name, running the BMW Z4 GT3 with Akira Iida and Hiroki Yoshimoto as their drivers. The team won its first race at the Suzuka 1000 km that year. Yoshimoto placed 6th in the drivers' ranking (Iida also had the same points as Yoshimoto, but was placed 7th due to missing the final race), and 5th in the team ranking. In 2015, the team's main car became the number 60 Lexus RC F GT3 while The BMW Z4 that participated the previous year also participated in the race with car number 51 as a second car run by Inging Motorsport. The drivers were Morio Nitta, who transferred from Toyota-affiliated apr, and Shigekazu Wakisaka, who returned to GT300 for the first time in seven years. However, the No. 60 RC F was not homologated by the FIA, so it had to undergo heavy performance adjustments, and it ended up with two 10th-place finishes (32nd in the drivers' ranking). The No. 51 car placed 17th with four points. In 2016, the No. 60 car's lineup remained the same, but the No. 51 car changed from the BMW Z4 GT3 to a new Ferrari 488 GT3. The team was formed with Morio Nitta, Akihiro Tsuzuki, and Shigekazu Wakisaka. The RC F was still not homologated due to difficulties in development, and the team was unable to score a single point.

In 2017, the team ran two Lexus RC F GT3. Toyota young driver Yuichi Nakayama, who had been transferred from apr alongside rookie Sho Tsuboi drove the 51 car. The car also changed its tires from Yokohama to Bridgestone. The RC F finally obtained homologation, with Car No. 51 winning the second round at Fuji and the seventh round in Thailand, and claimed third place in the standings. In 2018, the No. 51 car changed to No. 96 car, and the team was joined by Okayama Toyopet's K-tunes Racing, which had also participated in the 86/BRZ race. The driver was Morio Nitta, replacing Tsuboi. Akira Iida stepped down from driving, and was appointed as the team manager. Two-time FIA-F4 champion Ritomo Miyata was selected as his successor. The No. 96 car won two races, and Morio Nitta regained the record for the most wins in a row, which had been broken by Shinichi Takagi. On the other hand, the No. 60 car did not achieve any notable results other than a third-place podium finish in the fourth race in Thailand. In 2019, LM Corsa only ran one car after K-tunes opted to run independently, and the driver remained the same, but the tire supplier was changed to Dunlop. The team won the sixth race at Autopolis and placed 9th in the team rankings. They also run a Ferrari 488 GT3 for the non championship round with Togo Suganami, and Shunsuke Kohno.

In 2020, the team replaced Miyata with Shunsuke Kohno, and changed tire manufacturer to Michelin. In 2021, the team switched to the GT300 Toyota GR Supra and tire manufacturer returned to Dunlop.

==== GT World Challenge Asia ====
In 2022, LM Corsa entered GT World Challenge Asia Japan Cup with the Ferrari 488 GT3 Evo 2020 with Shigekazu Wakisaka, and Kei Nakanishi as their drivers. The team made their full debut in 2024 with the new Ferrari 296 GT3, Wakisaka stays, as Ryo Ogawa joins him for this season.
