= Super Formula Lights =

Auto racing championship in Japan

- Category: Single seaters
- Country: Japan
- Inaugural season: 2020
- Constructors: Dallara
- Engine suppliers: Toyota-TOM'S
- Tyre suppliers: Kumho Tire
- Drivers' champion: Yuto Nomura
- Teams' champion: B-Max Racing Team
- Official website: superformula-lights.com

Super Formula Lights (スーパーフォーミュラライツ, Sūpāfōmyuraraitu) is a national formula racing championship that takes place in Japan. It is a junior-level feeder formula that uses the same single seater chassis as the pan-European Euroformula Open Championship. The series serves as a feeder series for the Super Formula Championship. The nomenclature is similar to that of IndyCar, whose support series has formerly used the "Lights" moniker.

== Origins ==
The Super Formula Lights championship started in 1979 as a Formula 3-based series originally known as the Japanese Formula 3 Championship, because of changes with FIA nomenclature ("Formula Regional" is now used for all regional F3-based series to prevent confusion with the FIA Formula 3 Championship), and the change from Formula Regional standards used in such series (such as the Formula Regional European Championship and Formula Regional Americas Championship; in Japan, K2 Planet acquired the rights to run a Formula Regional championship in Japan, the Formula Regional Japanese Championship from the FIA) to sharing a single specification rule set with the Euroformula Open Championship, similar to Germany's Deutsche Tourenwagen Masters and Japan's Super GT sharing a single Class 1 formula touring car, on 17 August 2019 the series promoters surrendered the rights to the Formula Regional championship in Japan and rebranded the series to Super Formula Lights.

== Equipment ==
The Series has similar rules to the Euroformula Open Championship, which forced the name change in 2020.

- Chassis:
  Dallara remains the specification chassis builder for Super Formula Championship for the 2020 season, with the Dallara 320 shared with Euroformula Open being used. The new chassis features revamped aerodynamics and a Halo intrusion device. For 2024, The series will use new updated Dallara 324.
- Engines:
  Toyota-TOM'S, Mugen-Honda, Toda Racing and ThreeBond (Nissan) would remain as official series engine partners from 2020 season. The Spiess Tuning Volkswagen R4 engine proved to be popular. But for 2024, the series will use only TOM'S spec engine and based on the Toyota GR Yaris three cylinder 1.6-litre turbo engine.
- Tyres:
  Kumho Tire is the sole tire partner for the series, replaces Yokohama who has been involved since 2011 season where the series named Japanese Formula 3 Championship.

== Champions ==
=== Drivers ===
Season	Driver	Team	Wins	Poles	Fastest laps	Podiums	Points	Margin
2020	(Japan) Ritomo Miyata	Corolla Chukyo Kuo Team TOM'S	12	6	15	16	153	37
2021	(Japan) Teppei Natori	B-Max Racing Team	6	6	5	11	109	6
2022	(Japan) Kazuto Kotaka	TOM'S	8	3	3	11	114	6
2023	(Japan) Iori Kimura	B-Max Racing Team	6	5	8	12	113	9
2024	(Japan) Syun Koide	B-Max Racing Team	8	6	7	11	114	28
2025	(Japan) Yuto Nomura	B-Max Racing Team	12	8	8	16	153	49
2026	(France) Evan Giltaire	B-Max Racing Team	6	2	4	12	110.5	15

=== Teams ===
Season	Team	Wins	Points	Margin
2020	Corolla Chukyo Kuo Team TOM'S	13	137	27
2021	TOM'S	4	102	4
2022	TOM'S	11	151	51
2023	B-Max Racing Team	9	146	29
2024	TOM'S	9	143	19
2025	B-Max Racing Team	13	173	31
2026	TOM'S	6	120	4.5

=== Masters Class ===
Season	Driver	Team	Wins	Poles	Fastest laps	Podiums	Points	Margin
2020	(Japan) "Dragon"	B-Max Engineering	14	6	13	16	155	53
2021	(Japan) Nobuhiro Imada	B-Max Engineering	12	10	14	17	156	66
2022	(Japan) Nobuhiro Imada	B-Max Racing Team	10	8	9	16	143	17
2023	(Japan) Nobuhiro Imada	B-Max Racing Team	11	7	7	15	150	23
2024	(Japan) "Dragon"	Team Dragon	9	1	8	18	152	53
2025	(Japan) Yasuhiro Shimizu	GNSY Racing	9	7	8	15	133	25
2026	(Japan) "Ken Alex"	Buzz Racing	9	7	7	15	131.5	15.5

== Circuits ==
- **Bold** denotes a circuit used in the 2024 season.
- Italic denotes a formerly used circuit.

Number	Circuits	Rounds	Years
1	Mobility Resort Motegi	6 (Note: Mobility Resort Motegi hosted 2 rounds in 2021.)	2020–present
2	Sportsland SUGO	5	2020–present
2	Autopolis	5	2020–present
2	Suzuka Circuit	5	2020–present
2	Fuji Speedway	5	2020–present
6	Okayama International Circuit	4	2020, 2022–present

== See also ==
- Indy NXT Series
- Super2 Series
- DTM Trophy
- FIA Formula 2
- FIA Formula 3
