= Rin Arakawa =

Japanese racing driver

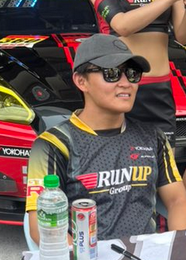
- Arakawa at the 2025 Super GT Malaysia Festival
- Nationality: (Japan) Japanese
- Born: 10 October 1999 (age 27) Saitama, Japan

Super GT - GT300 career
- Debut season: 2024
- Current team: Tomei Sports
- Car number: 360
- Starts: 12
- Wins: 0
- Podiums: 0
- Poles: 0
- Fastest laps: 0
- Best finish: 27th in 2025

Previous series
- 2024 2019-2023: Super Formula Lights; F4 Japanese Championship

Rin Arakawa (荒川 麟, Arakawa Rin; born 10 October 1999) is a Japanese racing driver currently competing in Super GT and Super Formula Lights. He was runner up in the 2021 F4 Japanese Championship

== Career ==
=== Formula 4 ===
Arakawa made his debut in 2019 F4 Japanese Championship in the last round. He made his full season debut with Zap Speed, where he managed to get two podiums. Arakawa switched to TGR-DC Racing School for the 2021 season. He was runners-up in the standings with two wins, and eight podiums, losing out to Seita Nonaka by four points.

For 2022, Arakawa stayed again with the same team and series. Arakawa managed only to get third place in the standings without a single win to his name. He lost out to Honda Junior drivers, champion Syun Koide & runners up Yusuke Mitsui. Arakawa spent another year in the series, as he returns to Zap Speed for his fourth season in F4.

=== Super Formula Lights ===
Arakawa stepped up to Super Formula Lights with B-Max Racing Team as he only raced for selected rounds. He raced for the first round with "Team Dragon", where he managed to clinch a podium. He then moved to the B-Max team for the second and third rounds. He scored three more podiums.

=== Super GT ===
Arakawa joined Tomei Sport for the Super GT - GT300 2024 season as their third driver.

== Racing record ==
=== Career summary ===
Season	Series	Team	Races	Wins	Poles	FLaps	Podiums	Points	Position
2019	F4 Japanese Championship	Akiland Racing	2	0	0	0	0	0	28th
2020	F4 Japanese Championship	Zap Speed	12	0	0	0	2	54	8th
2021	F4 Japanese Championship	TGR-DC Racing School	14	2	2	3	8	126	**2nd**
2022	F4 Japanese Championship	TGR-DC Racing School	14	0	0	1	9	173	**3rd**
2022	Super Taikyu - ST-2	KTMS Kobe Toyopet Motor Sports	6	5	0	1	6	173‡	**1st‡**
2023	F4 Japanese Championship	Zap Speed	8	0	0	1	0	75	6th
2023	F4 Japanese Championship	Dr.Dry	6	0	0	1	1	75	6th
2023	Super Taikyu - ST-2	Kobe Toyopet Motor Sports	6	1	2	5	1	95‡	4th‡
2024	Super Formula Lights	Team Dragon	6	0	0	0	2	44	6th
2024	Super Formula Lights	B-Max Racing Team	9	0	0	0	3	44	6th
2024	Super GT - GT300	Tomei Sports	5	0	0	0	0	0	NC
2024	Super Taikyu - ST-2	Saitama Green Brave	2	0	0	0	1	82.5‡	**1st‡**
2024	Super Taikyu - ST-X	Team Handwork Challenge	1	0	0	0	0	0‡	NC‡
2025	Super GT - GT300	Tomei Sports	7	0	0	0	0	6	28th
2025	Super Taikyu - ST-Z	Saitama Green Brave							
2025	Super Taikyu - ST-2	KTMS							
2026	Super Taikyu - ST-2	KTMS							
2026	Super GT - GT300	Tomei Sports	8	0	0	0	1	29	24th

=== Complete F4 Japanese Championship results ===
(key) (Races in bold indicate pole position) (Races in italics indicate fastest lap)

Year	Team	1	2	3	4	5	6	7	8	9	10	11	12	13	14	DC	Points
2019	Akiland Racing	OKA; 1	OKA; 2	FUJ1; 1	FUJ1; 2	SUZ; 1	SUZ; 2	FUJ2; 1	FUJ2; 2	AUT; 1	AUT; 2	SUG; 1	SUG; 2	MOT; 1; 14	MOT; 2; 15	28th	0
2020	Zap Speed	FUJ1; 1 Ret	FUJ1; 2; 2	FUJ1; 3; 17	SUZ; 1; 2	SUZ; 2; 5	SUZ; 3 Ret	MOT; 1 DNS	MOT; 2; 5	MOT; 3; 17	FUJ2; 1 Ret	FUJ2; 2; 10	FUJ2; 3; 9			8th	54
2021	TGR-DC Racing School	FUJ1; 1; 6	FUJ1; 2; 2	SUZ; 1; 5	SUZ; 2; 1	MOT1; 1; 4	MOT1; 2; 3	MOT1; 3; 3	SUG; 1; 4	SUG; 2; 5	SUG; 3; 4	**MOT2**; **1**; 2	**MOT2**; **2**; 1	FUJ2; 1; 3	FUJ2; 2; 2	2nd	213
2022	TGR-DC Racing School	FUJ1; 1; 4	FUJ1; 2; 21	SUZ1; 1; 3	SUZ1; 2; 15	FUJ2; 1; 2	FUJ2; 2; 4	SUZ2; 1; 3	SUZ2; 2; 3	SUG; 1; 8	SUG; 2; 3	AUT; 1; 2	AUT; 2; 2	MOT; 1; 3	MOT; 2; 2	3rd	175
2023	Zap Speed	FUJ1; 1; 34	FUJ1; 2; 4	SUZ; 1; 5	SUZ; 2; 5	FUJ2; 1; 7	FUJ2; 2; 8	SUZ2; 1; 8	SUZ2; 2; 20							6th	75
2023	Dr. Dry									SUG; 1; 8	SUG; 2; 7	AUT; 1; 11	AUT; 2; 8	MOT; 1; 3	MOT; 2; 12	6th	75

=== Complete Super GT results ===
Year	Team	Car	Class	1	2	3	4	5	6	7	8	9	DC	Pts
2024	Tomei Sports	Nissan GT-R Nismo GT3	GT300	OKA	FUJ1; 21	SUZ1; 23	FUJ2; 17	SUG	AUT	MOT; 18	SUZ2; 18		NC	0
2025	Tomei Sports	Nissan GT-R Nismo GT3	GT300	OKA; 18	FUJ; 12	SEP; 18	FS1; 20	FS2 (20)	SUZ; 19	SUG; 14	AUT	MOT; 19	27th	4
2026	Tomei Sports	Nissan GT-R Nismo GT3	GT300	OKA; 26	FUJ; 19	FUJ; 18	SUZ; 7	SUG; 18	AUT; 2	MOT; 17	MOT; 18		24th	29

=== Complete Super Formula Lights results ===
(key) (Races in bold indicate pole position) (Races in italics indicate fastest lap)

Year	Entrant	1	2	3	4	5	6	7	8	9	10	11	12	13	14	15	16	17	18	Pos	Points
2024	Team Dragon	AUT; 1; 3	AUT; 2; 6	AUT; 3; 5													MOT; 1; 3	MOT; 2; 6	MOT; 3; 4	6th	44
2024	B-Max Racing Team				SUG; 1; 3	SUG; 2; 4	SUG; 3; 4	FUJ; 1; 2	FUJ; 2; 5	FUJ; 3; 2	OKA; 1 Ret	OKA; 2; 7	OKA; 3; 8	SUZ; 1	SUZ; 2	SUZ; 3				6th	44
