= 2026 Super Formula Lights =

Formula racing championship

The 2026 Super Formula Lights Championship was the seventh Super Formula Lights Championship season, after the Japanese Formula 3 Championship was rebranded following the end of the 2019 season. It started on 28 March at Fuji Speedway and was run over 18 races across six race weekends.

Evan Giltaire won the Drivers' Championship title with a race to spare, becoming the first non-Japanese champion under the series' current guise. TOM'S meanwhile defended their Teams' Championship title, claiming their fourth overall, and Buzz's Racing's "Ken Alex" took the Masters' title in his first full season of competition.

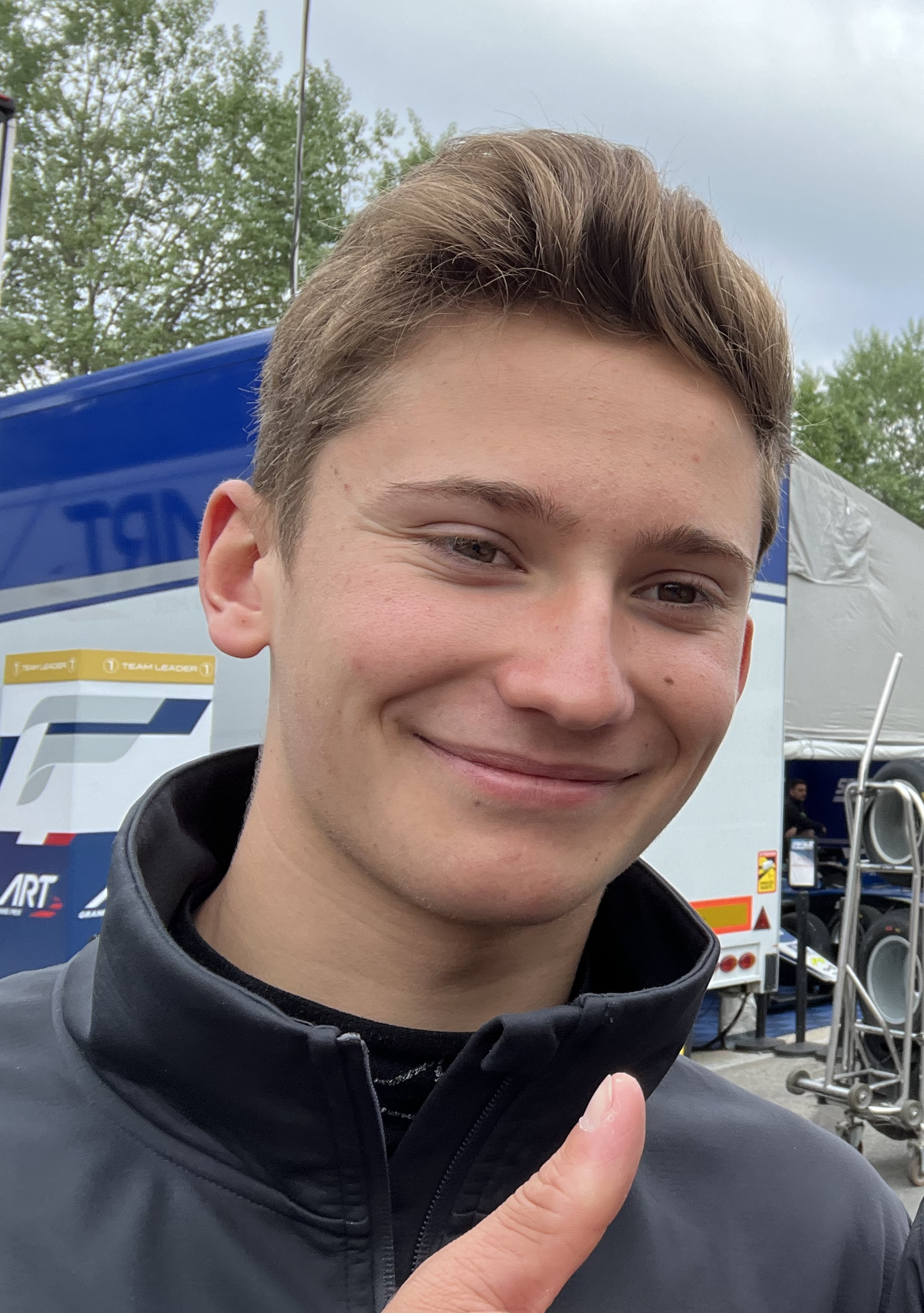
Evan Giltaire, driving for B-Max Racing Team, won the Super Formula Lights title.

== Teams and drivers ==
As the championship was a spec series, all teams competed with an identical Dallara 324 chassis with a Toyota GR Yaris three-cylinder 1.6-litre turbo engine. All teams competed with tyres supplied by Kumho Tire.

Team	No.	Driver	Status	Rounds	Ref
(Japan) B-Max Racing Team	1	(France) Evan Giltaire		All	
(Japan) B-Max Racing Team	50	(Japan) Kotaro Shimbara		All	
(Japan) Delightworks Racing	2	(Japan) Kazuhisa Urabe		All	
(Japan) Delightworks Racing	3	(Japan) Yusuke Mitsui		All	
(Japan) JMS Racing Team	4	(Japan) Nobuhiro Imada	M	1, 5	
(Japan) Buzz Racing	6	(Japan) "Ken Alex"	M	All	
(Japan) Buzz Racing	51	(Japan) Daichi Okamoto		6	
(Japan) Art Taste Racing	8	(Japan) Yasuhiro Shimizu	M	1–3, 5–6	
(Japan) B-Max Engineering	26	(Japan) Rintaro Sato		1–3, 5–6	
(Japan) B-Max Engineering	30	(Japan) "Dragon"	M	All	
(Japan) TOM'S	35	(Japan) Kiyoshi Umegaki		All	
(Japan) TOM'S	36	(Austria) Oscar Wurz		All	
(Japan) TOM'S	37	(India) Akshay Bohra		All	
(Japan) TOM'S	38	(Japan) Tokiya Suzuki		1, 3–6	
(Japan) TOM'S	38	(Japan) Yuzuki Miura		2	
(Japan) LM corsa	60	(Japan) Kenta Kumagai		1–3, 5–6	

Icon	Class
M	Masters' Cup

=== Team changes ===
Buzz Racing made their full-season debut in the series after entering the last round in 2025, with B-Max Racing Team operating the team.

B-Max Racing Team revived the B-Max Engineering entry after a four-year absence, and rebranded its one-car GNSY Racing offshoot to Art Taste Racing.

=== Driver changes ===
Teams' Champion B-Max Racing Team only entered two cars under its main guise, three less than in 2025. The team had an all-new lineup as Kazuhisa Urabe moved to Delightworks Racing, team owner "Dragon" entered the 2026 season under the returning B-Max Engineering banner, reigning Drivers' Champion Yuto Nomura graduated to the team's Super Formula outfit, Kaylen Frederick moved to IMSA SportsCar GTP with JDC–Miller MotorSports and Zachary David left the championship. B-Max promoted Kotaro Shimbara from their Japanese F4 outfit, where he finished fourth in 2025, and signed 2025 Formula Regional Middle East champion Evan Giltaire, who finished fifth in 2025 Formula Regional Europe with ART Grand Prix.

TOM'S also fully renewed their four-car lineup after Rikuto Kobayashi stepped up to Super Formula with TGMGP, Esteban Masson returned to FIA WEC LMGT3 with Akkodis ASP Team, Yuki Sano moved to Formula Regional Europe with R-ace GP and Yuga Furutani joined Maple Hiroshima Racing Team in Super Taikyu's ST-5R class. The team signed reigning Formula Regional Japan champion Kiyoshi Umegaki, reigning F4 Japan champion Tokiya Suzuki, 2024 Euro 4 champion Akshay Bohra, who finished sixth in the 2025 Formula Regional European Championship with R-ace GP, and 2024 Formula 4 CEZ champion Oscar Wurz, who finished 18th in the 2025 Eurocup-3 with Drivex.

Delightworks Racing saw none of the three part-time drivers of their No. 2 car return for 2026. The team hired Kazuhisa Urabe, who moved over from B-Max Racing after finishing his debut Super Formula Lights season in tenth.

Reimei Ito left the series to move back to Porsche Carrera Cup Japan with Bingo Racing. To replace him, LM corsa promoted Kenta Kumagai from its outfit in F4 Japan, where he finished ninth in 2025.

Nobuhiro Imada continued to race for JMS Racing Team, but reduced his efforts to a part-time schedule alongside his Ferrari Challenge Europe campaign.

Ken Watanabe, who races under the pseudonym "Ken Alex", rejoined new entrant Buzz Racing for his and the team's full-season debut after finishing fifth in F4 Japan's Independent Class in 2025 and already driving for the team in the final round of 2025.

The returning B-Max Engineering outfit entered one full-season car for team owner "Dragon" and one car for the first half of the season, piloted by Rintaro Sato after he came ninth in the 2025 French F4 Championship.

==== Mid-season ====
Tokiya Suzuki missed the second round at Autopolis after his car license was suspended. He was replaced by series debutant Yuzuki Miura at TOM'S.

LM corsa did not attend the fourth round at Okayama as their driver Kenta Kumagai elected to prioritise his clashing F4 Japan campaign. Art Taste Racing's Yasuhiro Shimizu was also absent. B-Max Engineering opted not to field a replacement driver in the No. 28 car vacated by Rintaro Sato.

Rintaro Sato returned to B-Max Engineering for the final two rounds of the season after missing the Okayama round, despite originally being contracted for only the first half of the season.

Buzz Racing fielded a second car for the season finale at Motegi, with Toyota Gazoo Racing GR86/BRZ Cup driver Daichi Okamoto making his series debut alongside “Ken Alex.” Nobuhiro Imada, meanwhile, missed the final round after being sidelined by injuries sustained in a crash during the final race at Sugo.

== Calendar ==
The calendar for the 2026 season was announced on 13 November 2025. It once again consisted of eighteen races held over six weekends at six circuits. Two of the events supported the parent Super Formula Championship.

Round		Circuit	Date	Support bill	Map of circuit locations
1	R1	Fuji Speedway, Oyama	28 March	Fuji Champion Race Series; Honda N-One Owner's Cup; BMW Mini Challenge Japan; Toyota Gazoo Racing GR86/BRZ Cup	2026 Super Formula Lights is located in Japan
1	R2	Fuji Speedway, Oyama	29 March	Fuji Champion Race Series; Honda N-One Owner's Cup; BMW Mini Challenge Japan; Toyota Gazoo Racing GR86/BRZ Cup	2026 Super Formula Lights is located in Japan
1	R3	Fuji Speedway, Oyama	29 March	Fuji Champion Race Series; Honda N-One Owner's Cup; BMW Mini Challenge Japan; Toyota Gazoo Racing GR86/BRZ Cup	2026 Super Formula Lights is located in Japan
2	R4	Autopolis, Hita	25 April	Super Formula Championship; Honda N-One Owner's Cup	2026 Super Formula Lights is located in Japan
2	R5	Autopolis, Hita	26 April	Super Formula Championship; Honda N-One Owner's Cup	2026 Super Formula Lights is located in Japan
2	R6	Autopolis, Hita	26 April	Super Formula Championship; Honda N-One Owner's Cup	2026 Super Formula Lights is located in Japan
3	R7	Suzuka International Racing Course, Suzuka	23 May	Super Formula Championship; Formula Regional Japanese Championship	2026 Super Formula Lights is located in Japan
3	R8	Suzuka International Racing Course, Suzuka	24 May	Super Formula Championship; Formula Regional Japanese Championship	2026 Super Formula Lights is located in Japan
3	R9	Suzuka International Racing Course, Suzuka	24 May	Super Formula Championship; Formula Regional Japanese Championship	2026 Super Formula Lights is located in Japan
4	R10	Okayama International Circuit, Mimasaka	13 June	F4 Japanese Championship; Okayama Challenge Cup	2026 Super Formula Lights is located in Japan
4	R11	Okayama International Circuit, Mimasaka	14 June	F4 Japanese Championship; Okayama Challenge Cup	2026 Super Formula Lights is located in Japan
4	R12	Okayama International Circuit, Mimasaka	14 June	F4 Japanese Championship; Okayama Challenge Cup	2026 Super Formula Lights is located in Japan
5	R13	Sportsland Sugo, Murata	29 August	Formula Regional Japanese Championship; SUGO Champion Cup Race	2026 Super Formula Lights is located in Japan
5	R14	Sportsland Sugo, Murata	30 August	Formula Regional Japanese Championship; SUGO Champion Cup Race	2026 Super Formula Lights is located in Japan
5	R15	Sportsland Sugo, Murata	30 August	Formula Regional Japanese Championship; SUGO Champion Cup Race	2026 Super Formula Lights is located in Japan
6	R16	Mobility Resort Motegi, Motegi	12 September	Toyota Gazoo Racing Yaris Cup - Tohoku	2026 Super Formula Lights is located in Japan
6	R17	Mobility Resort Motegi, Motegi	13 September	Toyota Gazoo Racing Yaris Cup - Tohoku	2026 Super Formula Lights is located in Japan
6	R18	Mobility Resort Motegi, Motegi	13 September	Toyota Gazoo Racing Yaris Cup - Tohoku	2026 Super Formula Lights is located in Japan

== Season report ==
The first round of the 2026 Super Formula Lights season was held at Fuji Speedway, and Delightworks Racing's Yusuke Mitsui and TOM'S driver Kiyoshi Umegaki shared pole positions in qualifying. Mitsui led Umegaki throughout the opening race, with B-Max Racing's Evan Giltaire dropping down to seventh from third. The Frenchman spent the race working his way back up to third as Mitsui claimed victory. The second race saw Giltaire take the lead into the first corner despite initially dropping to third after a slow getaway. He converted his lead into victory, with TOM'S driver Tokiya Suzuki finishing second before dropping to fourth after a penalty that promoted Mitsui and Umegaki onto the podium. Mitsui had pole position again for race three and converted it into another lights-to-flag win to lead the championship, with Umegaki and Giltaire coming behind once again.

Round two at Autopolis saw B-Max driver Kotaro Shimbara claim double pole positions in qualifying. He maintained his lead from pole position as Mitsui climbed to second past Giltaire. Shimbara held on to take his maiden series victory. The second race was held in wet conditions, and Giltaire was the fastest driver on track, overtaking Mitsui for second at the start before taking the lead off Shimbara on lap 4. Giltaire managed the rest of the race to take victory as Shimbara dropped off the podium behind Umegaki. Race three saw the drivers start on slick tires. A collision between Giltaire and B-Max driver Rintaro Sato turned into a red flag as the rain then intensified. Drivers restarted on wet tyres and Giltaire was once again the fastest driver from then on. He moved past Mitsui and Shimbara to take another victory and close up to two points behind Mitsui in the standings.

Umegaki took both pole positions for round three at Suzuka. The first race began with him losing out to Mitsui at the start, but he regained the lead on lap seven, before Giltaire also got past. Mitsui was then hit by TOM'S driver Oscar Wurz and retired, handing third to Shimbara. Race two saw Umegaki hold his lead as Shimbara and Mitsui fought for second behind him. Suzuki also entered the battle and got past both of them, before Mitsui got spun by TOM'S driver Akshay Bohra and Umegaki dropped down the order. Wurz took the final podium spot after passing Sato. Umegaki also had pole position for race three, and he was able to drive away as Shimbara and Giltaire contested second. The pair eventually collided, taking both out and handing podium spots to Bohra and Suzuki. Umegaki's perfect weekend saw him take an eight-point lead over Giltaire in the standings.

The second half of the season began with two pole positions for Mitsui at Okayama, narrowly ahead of Umegaki both times. Giltaire qualified third for race one, and the top trio remained static throughout that largely uneventful opening encounter. The second race saw Mitsui hold his advantage again, aided by a good start for his teammate Kazuhisa Urabe, who jumped from fourth to second. Umegaki pressured Urabe all race, including after a mid-race safety car when Wurz beached his car, but was unable to get past, allowing Delightworks to secure their maiden 1-2 finish. His performance in the first two races handed Mitsui pole position for the third race, with Umegaki and Giltaire starting second and third once again. Another unchallenged victory for Mitsui with no positional changes in the top group followed, handing the winner a one-point lead over Umegaki.

Suzuki claimed both pole positions in qualifying for the penultimate round at Sportsland Sugo. In race one, he led Giltaire as Umegaki lost third to Shimbara on the opening lap. No further changes among the top group followed, handing Suzuki his maiden victory. Race two brought more of the same, with Suzuki controlling the race once more as Bohra overtook Umegaki for second at the start and held on to the position throughout the race. A time penalty for Umegaki then saw him lose the final podium spot to Giltaire. Race three began with a stall for Shimbara, who was then collected by JMS Racing Team's Nobuhiro Imada in a huge crash that brought out the red flag. The resumption was then called off after four laps behind the safety car, meaning half points were awarded as Suzuki swept the weekend ahead of Giltaire and Mitsui, who led Umegaki by 3.5 points.

Mobility Resort Motegi hosted the season finale, and Giltaire took both pole positions in qualifying. He turned his first pole position into an unchallenged victory after defending from Bohra at the start. Shimbara took third, while Mitsui and Umegaki finished off the podium, which saw Giltaire take a three-point lead in the championship standings. Race two began in similar fashion, with Giltaire driving away as Shimbara took second place off Umegaki. A safety car interruption brought no trouble for Giltaire, and the top three remained static afterwards as Giltaire took the win. With that, he also claimed the championship title, becoming the series' first international champion. Giltaire capped off his title-winning weekend with another untroubled victory in race three, sweeping the weekend ahead of Mitsui and Bohra to end the season with a 15-point gap over Mitsui in the championship, with Umegaki 23.5 points behind in third.

== Race results ==
Round		Circuit	Pole position	Fastest lap	Winning driver	Winning team	Masters winner
1	R1	Fuji Speedway	(Japan) Yusuke Mitsui	(Japan) Yusuke Mitsui	(Japan) Yusuke Mitsui	(Japan) Delightworks Racing	(Japan) "Ken Alex"
1	R2	Fuji Speedway	(Japan) Kiyoshi Umegaki	(Japan) Tokiya Suzuki	(France) Evan Giltaire	(Japan) B-Max Racing Team	(Japan) Yasuhiro Shimizu
1	R3	Fuji Speedway		(Japan) Kiyoshi Umegaki	(Japan) Yusuke Mitsui	(Japan) Delightworks Racing	(Japan) Nobuhiro Imada
2	R4	Autopolis	(Japan) Kotaro Shimbara	(Japan) Kotaro Shimbara	(Japan) Kotaro Shimbara	(Japan) B-Max Racing Team	(Japan) Yasuhiro Shimizu
2	R5	Autopolis	(Japan) Kotaro Shimbara	(France) Evan Giltaire	(France) Evan Giltaire	(Japan) B-Max Racing Team	(Japan) "Dragon"
2	R6	Autopolis		(Japan) Kotaro Shimbara	(France) Evan Giltaire	(Japan) B-Max Racing Team	(Japan) Yasuhiro Shimizu
3	R7	Suzuka International Racing Course	(Japan) Kiyoshi Umegaki	(Japan) Yusuke Mitsui	(Japan) Kiyoshi Umegaki	(Japan) TOM'S	(Japan) "Ken Alex"
3	R8	Suzuka International Racing Course	(Japan) Kiyoshi Umegaki	(Japan) Kiyoshi Umegaki	(Japan) Kiyoshi Umegaki	(Japan) TOM'S	(Japan) "Ken Alex"
3	R9	Suzuka International Racing Course		(Japan) Kiyoshi Umegaki	(Japan) Kiyoshi Umegaki	(Japan) TOM'S	(Japan) "Ken Alex"
4	R10	Okayama International Circuit	(Japan) Yusuke Mitsui	(Japan) Yusuke Mitsui	(Japan) Yusuke Mitsui	(Japan) Delightworks Racing	(Japan) "Ken Alex"
4	R11	Okayama International Circuit	(Japan) Yusuke Mitsui	(Japan) Yusuke Mitsui	(Japan) Yusuke Mitsui	(Japan) Delightworks Racing	(Japan) "Ken Alex"
4	R12	Okayama International Circuit		(Japan) Yusuke Mitsui	(Japan) Yusuke Mitsui	(Japan) Delightworks Racing	(Japan) "Ken Alex"
5	R13	Sportsland Sugo	(Japan) Tokiya Suzuki	(Japan) Tokiya Suzuki	(Japan) Tokiya Suzuki	(Japan) TOM'S	(Japan) Nobuhiro Imada
5	R14	Sportsland Sugo	(Japan) Tokiya Suzuki	(Japan) Tokiya Suzuki	(Japan) Tokiya Suzuki	(Japan) TOM'S	(Japan) Nobuhiro Imada
5	R15	Sportsland Sugo		(Japan) Kenta Kumagai	(Japan) Tokiya Suzuki	(Japan) TOM'S	(Japan) "Dragon"
6	R16	Mobility Resort Motegi	(France) Evan Giltaire	(France) Evan Giltaire	(France) Evan Giltaire	(Japan) B-Max Racing Team	(Japan) "Ken Alex"
6	R17	Mobility Resort Motegi	(France) Evan Giltaire	(France) Evan Giltaire	(France) Evan Giltaire	(Japan) B-Max Racing Team	(Japan) Yasuhiro Shimizu
6	R18	Mobility Resort Motegi		(France) Evan Giltaire	(France) Evan Giltaire	(Japan) B-Max Racing Team	(Japan) "Ken Alex"

== Championship standings ==
Points were awarded to the top six classified finishers as follows:

Position	**1st**	**2nd**	**3rd**	**4th**	**5th**	**6th**	Pole
Points	10	7	5	3	2	1	**1**

=== Drivers' Championship ===
Pos	Driver	FUJ			AUT			SUZ			OKA			SUG			MOT			Pts
Pos	Driver	R1	R2	R3	R4	R5	R6	R7	R8	R9	R10	R11	R12	R13	R14	R15 (Note: Half points were awarded in the third race of round five at Sugo as adverse weather conditions saw the race stopped after just four laps.)	R16	R17	R18	Pts
1	(France) Evan Giltaire	3	1	3	3	1	1	2	7	Ret	3	6	3	2	3	2	**1**	**1**	1	110.5
2	(Japan) Yusuke Mitsui	**1**	2	1	2	2	3	Ret	9	6	**1**	**1**	1	4	7	3	5	6	2	95.5
3	(Japan) Kiyoshi Umegaki	2	**3**	2	6	3	5	**1**	**1**	1	2	3	2	5	10	5	8	3	7	87
4	(Japan) Tokiya Suzuki	9	4	6				8	2	3	8	5	5	**1**	**1**	1	6	4	5	53
5	(Japan) Kotaro Shimbara	10	6	7	**1**	**5**	2	3	8	Ret	7	4	6	3	5	Ret	3	2	6	51
6	(India) Akshay Bohra	8	7	10	7	Ret	6	4	10	2	6	7	10	6	2	4	2	Ret	3	33.5
7	(Japan) Kazuhisa Urabe	4	5	5	8	8	7	6	5	Ret	5	2	4	10	8	8	4	5	4	30
8	(Austria) Oscar Wurz	5	8	4	5	7	11	11	3	4	4	Ret	9	8	6	6	11	7	9	19.5
9	(Japan) Rintaro Sato	6	10	8	4	4	Ret	5	4	5				7	4	7	7	Ret	8	17
10	(Japan) Yuzuki Miura				9	6	4													4
11	(Japan) Kenta Kumagai	7	9	9	10	9	10	7	6	7				9	9	9	10	8	10	1
12	(Japan) "Ken Alex"	11	Ret	14	12	12	9	9	11	8	9	8	7	13	13	12	12	Ret	12	0
13	(Japan) "Dragon"	13	12	12	13	10	12	11	12	9	10	9	8	12	12	10	14	10	14	0
14	(Japan) Yasuhiro Shimizu	14	11	13	11	11	8	10	13	DNS				14	Ret	11	13	9	13	0
15	(Japan) Daichi Okamoto																9	Ret	11	0
16	(Japan) Nobuhiro Imada	12	13	11										11	11	Ret				0
Pos	Driver	R1	R2	R3	R4	R5	R6	R7	R8	R9	R10	R11	R12	R13	R14	R15	R16	R17	R18	Pts
Pos	Driver	FUJ			AUT			SUZ			OKA			SUG			MOT			Pts

Key
Colour	Result
Gold	Winner
Silver	Second place
Bronze	Third place
Green	Other points position
Blue	Other classified position
Blue	Not classified, finished (NC)
Purple	Not classified, retired (Ret)
Red	Did not qualify (DNQ)
Red	Did not pre-qualify (DNPQ)
Black	Disqualified (DSQ)
White	Did not start (DNS)
White	Race cancelled (C)
Blank	Did not practice (DNP)
Blank	Excluded (EX)
Blank	Did not arrive (DNA)
Blank	Withdrawn (WD)
Blank	Did not enter (cell empty)
Text formatting	Meaning
**Bold**	Pole position
Italics	Fastest lap

† — Did not finish but classified

==== Masters' Class ====
Pos	Driver	FUJ			AUT			SUZ			OKA			SUG			MOT			Pts
Pos	Driver	R1	R2	R3	R4	R5	R6	R7	R8	R9	R10	R11	R12	R13	R14	R15	R16	R17	R18	Pts
1	(Japan) "Ken Alex"	**1**	**Ret**	4	2	3	2	1	1	1	**1**	**1**	1	**3**	3	3	**1**	**Ret**	1	131.5
2	(Japan) "Dragon"	3	2	2	**3**	1	3	3	2	2	2	2	2	2	2	1	3	2	3	116
3	(Japan) Yasuhiro Shimizu	4	1	3	1	**2**	1	**2**	**3**	DNS				4	**Ret**	2	2	1	2	91.5
4	(Japan) Nobuhiro Imada	2	3	1										1	1	Ret				42
Pos	Driver	R1	R2	R3	R4	R5	R6	R7	R8	R9	R10	R11	R12	R13	R14	R15	R16	R17	R18	Pts
Pos	Driver	FUJ			AUT			SUZ			OKA			SUG			MOT			Pts

=== Teams' Championship ===
Each team acquired the points earned by their highest finishing driver in each race.

Pos	Team	FUJ			AUT			SUZ			OKA			SUG			MOT			Pts
Pos	Team	R1	R2	R3	R4	R5	R6	R7	R8	R9	R10	R11	R12	R13	R14	R15	R16	R17	R18	Pts
1	(Japan) TOM'S	2	3	2	5	3	4	1	1	1	2	3	2	1	1	1	2	3	3	120
2	(Japan) B-Max Racing Team	3	1	3	1	1	1	2	7	Ret	3	4	3	2	3	2	1	1	1	115.5
3	(Japan) Delightworks Racing	1	2	1	2	2	3	6	5	6	1	1	1	4	7	3	4	5	2	97.5
4	(Japan) B-Max Engineering	6	10	8	4	4	12	5	4	5	10	9	8	7	4	7	7	10	8	17
5	(Japan) LM corsa	7	9	9	10	9	10	7	6	7				9	9	9	10	8	10	1
6	(Japan) Buzz Racing	11	Ret	14	12	12	9	9	11	8	9	8	7	13	13	12	9	Ret	11	0
7	(Japan) Art Taste Racing	14	11	13	11	11	8	10	13	DNS				14	Ret	11	13	9	13	0
8	(Japan) JMS Racing Team	12	13	11										11	11	Ret				0
Pos	Team	R1	R2	R3	R4	R5	R6	R7	R8	R9	R10	R11	R12	R13	R14	R15	R16	R17	R18	Pts
Pos	Team	FUJ			AUT			SUZ			OKA			SUG			MOT			Pts
