= 2022 F4 Japanese Championship =

Motor racing competition

The 2022 F4 Japanese Championship season was the eighth season of the F4 Japanese Championship. It was competed with 14 races over seven double-header rounds.

== Teams and drivers ==
All teams and drivers were Japanese-registered

Team	No.	Driver	Class	Rounds
Field Motorsports	3	Sergeyevich Sato	I	1–2
Field Motorsports	55	"Kentaro"	I	All
Honda Formula Dream Project	5	Syun Koide		All
Honda Formula Dream Project	6	Kazuma Nishimura		All
Honda Formula Dream Project	7	Yusuke Mitsui		All
SD-Style	8	Takumi Sanada		1
Rn-sports	11	Itsuki Sato		1
Rn-sports	11	Isao Nakashima	I	2, 4
Rn-sports	11	"Hirobon"	I	6
Rn-sports	11	"Daisuke"	I	7
Rn-sports	99	Yoshitsugu Kondo	I	All
Hitotsuyama Racing	13	Daiki Fujiwara		1–5, 7
Zap Speed	14	Kotaro Shimbara		All
Zap Speed	86	Hachiro Osaka	I	All
Zap Speed	87	Rio Shimono		All
Media Do Kageyama Racing	15	Wataru Yoshimura		All
Media Do Kageyama Racing	16	Takuya Otaki		All
Akiland Racing	18	Makoto Hotta	I	1–2
Akiland Racing	18	Ryota Horachi		3–4, 7
Akiland Racing	18	Yuta Fujiwara		5–6
Akiland Racing	22	Yuta Fujiwara		4, 7
Akiland Racing	71	Masayoshi Oyama	I	All
Akiland Racing	72	"Hirobon"	I	7
Akiland Racing	96	Makio Saito	I	All
KRac Motorsports	19	Shinnosuke Ito		1–5
N-SPEED	23	"Yugo"	I	All
Tsuyoshi Usui	24	Tsuyoshi Usui	I	2, 6
RSS	27	"Syuji"	I	All
Saccess Racing	29	Yasushi Ide	I	1
Saccess Racing	29	Daitetsu Ueno		2
Saccess Racing	29	Tadakazu Kojima	I	3–7
Saccess Racing	39	Hikaru Jitosho		All
Saccess Racing	40	Daitetsu Ueno		4
B-Max Racing Team	30	"Dragon"	I	All
B-Max Racing Team	44	Nobuhiro Imada	I	1–2
B-Max Racing Team	50	Yuki Mishima		1–2
Buzz Racing	31	Jiei Okuzumi		All
Buzz Racing	32	Shion Tsujimoto		1–2, 4–7
Buzz Racing	32	Daisuke Takaguchi		3
Buzz Racing	33	Katsunori Keihara	I	1–3
Buzz Racing	33	Ayato Iwasaki		4, 6–7
Buzz Racing	33	Teppei Tsuruta		5
TGR-DC Racing School	35	Rin Arakawa		All
TGR-DC Racing School	36	Rikuto Kobayashi		All
TGR-DC Racing School	37	Jin Nakamura		All
TGR-DC Racing School	38	Ryoma Henzan		All
Team Hero's	41	Shunji Okumoto		All
Tokaidenso MD	45	Toshihiro Kubota	I	7
Bionic Jack Racing	47	Yuta Fujiwara		1–3
Bionic Jack Racing	47	Sena Yamamoto		6–7
Bionic Jack Racing	81	Kazuhisa Urabe		All
Bionic Jack Racing	97	Yugo Iwasawa		All
HELM Motorsports	61	Takumi Sato		2–4, 7
HELM Motorsports	61	Itsuki Sato		5
HELM Motorsports	62	Fuma Horio		All
HELM Motorsports	63	Yutaka Toriba	I	All
Team RCOM	68	Ryunosuke Shibata		2, 4
Skill Speed	77	Gento Miyashita		All
OTG Motor Sports	80	Reimei Ito		All

Icon	Class
I	Independent Cup

== Race calendar and results ==
All rounds were held in Japan and supported the Super GT events.

Round		Circuit	Date	Pole position	Fastest lap	Winning driver	Winning team	Independent Cup winner
1	R1	Fuji Speedway, Oyama	3 May	Syun Koide	Rin Arakawa	Yusuke Mitsui (Note: Reimei Ito crossed the line first but was given a 5 second penalty. Mitsui inherited the win.)	Honda Formula Dream Project	Yutaka Toriba
1	R2	Fuji Speedway, Oyama	4 May	Syun Koide	Syun Koide	Syun Koide	Honda Formula Dream Project	Yutaka Toriba
2	R3	Suzuka Circuit, Suzuka	28 May	Syun Koide	Syun Koide	Syun Koide	Honda Formula Dream Project	Makio Saito
2	R4	Suzuka Circuit, Suzuka	29 May	Syun Koide	Syun Koide	Syun Koide	Honda Formula Dream Project	Yutaka Toriba
3	R5	Fuji Speedway, Oyama	6 August	Syun Koide (Note: The qualifying session was cancelled due to heavy fog. The starting grid was set by the fastest overall times from the practice sessions.)	Rikuto Kobayashi	Syun Koide	Honda Formula Dream Project	Yutaka Toriba
3	R6	Fuji Speedway, Oyama	7 August	Rikuto Kobayashi (Note: Due to the cancellation of qualifying, the starting grid was set from the fastest lap times set in the first race.)	Yugo Iwasawa	Syun Koide	Honda Formula Dream Project	Yutaka Toriba
4	R7	Suzuka Circuit, Suzuka	27 August	Yusuke Mitsui	Syun Koide	Yusuke Mitsui	Honda Formula Dream Project	Yutaka Toriba
4	R8	Suzuka Circuit, Suzuka	28 August	Yusuke Mitsui	Yusuke Mitsui	Yusuke Mitsui	Honda Formula Dream Project	Yutaka Toriba
5	R9	Sportsland Sugo, Murata	17 September	Syun Koide	Jin Nakamura	Syun Koide	Honda Formula Dream Project	Yutaka Toriba
5	R10	Sportsland Sugo, Murata	18 September	Jin Nakamura	Jin Nakamura	Jin Nakamura	TGR-DC Racing School	Yutaka Toriba
6	R11	Autopolis, Hita	1 October	Syun Koide	Jin Nakamura	Syun Koide	Honda Formula Dream Project	"Hirobon"
6	R12	Autopolis, Hita	2 October	Syun Koide	Syun Koide	Syun Koide	Honda Formula Dream Project	"Dragon"
7	R13	Mobility Resort Motegi, Motegi	5 November	Rikuto Kobayashi	Rikuto Kobayashi	Rikuto Kobayashi	TGR-DC Racing School	"Dragon"
7	R14	Mobility Resort Motegi, Motegi	6 November	Rikuto Kobayashi	Syun Koide	Syun Koide	Honda Formula Dream Project	Yutaka Toriba

== Championship standings ==
Points were awarded as follows:

Position	**1st**	**2nd**	**3rd**	**4th**	**5th**	**6th**	**7th**	**8th**	**9th**	**10th**
Points	25	18	15	12	10	8	6	4	2	1

=== Drivers' standings ===
Pos	Driver	FUJ1		SUZ1		FUJ2		SUZ2		SUG		AUT		MOT		Pts
Pos	Driver	R1	R2	R3	R4	R5	R6	R7	R8	R9	R10	R11	R12	R13	R14	Pts
1	Syun Koide	**Ret**	**1**	**1**	**1**	**1**	1	2	2	**1**	26	**1**	**1**	2	1	279
2	Yusuke Mitsui	1	2	2	2	3	2	**1**	**1**	4	2	3	3	4	4	246
3	Rin Arakawa	4	21	3	15	2	4	3	3	8	3	2	2	3	2	175
4	Jin Nakamura	10	6	8	7	6	9	7	4	2	**1**	4	6	7	5	126
5	Yugo Iwasawa	2	4	5	4	4	3	9	Ret	12	5	6	4	6	7	125
6	Rikuto Kobayashi	8	5	15	8	7	**5**	4	5	3	7	5	DNS	**1**	**6**	120
7	Reimei Ito	3	3	10	6	5	7	11	9	10	10	10	7	9	Ret	68
8	Kazuma Nishimura	28	9	4	5	9	11	6	7	9	8	9	5	10	10	60
9	Gento Miyashita	11	7	11	Ret	10	8	5	6	7	12	16	16	8	3	54
10	Fuma Horio	14	10	16	18	11	6	26	15	5	4	11	10	16	15	32
11	Jiei Okuzumi	5	8	20	23	16	Ret	22	20	16	16	Ret	12	5	Ret	24
12	Takumi Sato			6	3	Ret	Ret	17	11					Ret	12	23
13	Takuya Otaki	12	36	7	10	8	14	10	12	Ret	13	7	30	Ret	17	18
14	Ryoma Henzan	6	19	Ret	9	13	16	14	16	13	14	12	9	35†	8	16
15	Teppei Tsuruta									6	9					10
16	Ayato Iwasaki							20	31			8	8	Ret	9	10
17	Daiki Fujiwara	16	12	35	11	28	Ret	16	17	11	6			11	11	8
18	Kazuhisa Urabe	9	37	25	19	14	13	8	10	18	19	19	14	17	19	7
19	Shunji Okumoto	7	13	13	13	12	12	15	13	17	11	15	17	15	14	6
20	Kotaro Shimbara	13	11	14	12	15	10	12	8	15	17	13	13	12	33†	5
21	Yuki Mishima	17	Ret	9	21											2
22	Yuta Fujiwara	20	17	23	22	Ret	22	25	14	19	20	14	11	14	13	0
23	Daitetsu Ueno			12	14			36	19							0
24	Ryota Horachi					20	18	13	29					13	32†	0
25	Itsuki Sato	21	18							14	15					0
26	Shion Tsujimoto	18	14	26	Ret			Ret	30	21	23	31	20	18	18	0
27	Wataru Yoshimura	15	Ret	WD	WD	17	15	21	22	Ret	21	17	Ret	33	22	0
28	Shinnosuke Ito	Ret	15	21	Ret	18	21	19	Ret	20	22					0
29	Sena Yamamoto											Ret	15	19	20	0
30	Hikaru Jitosho	19	Ret	Ret	16	31	17	18	23	31	18	20	18	22	Ret	0
31	Rio Shimono	34	16	22	34	21	20	33	18	23	24	18	19	21	Ret	0
32	Yutaka Toriba	22	20	18	20	19	19	23	24	22	25	25	25	23	16	0
33	Ryunosuke Shibata			19	17			24	21							0
34	Makio Saito	25	23	17	24	23	23	27	Ret	24	Ret	22	24	24	23	0
35	"Dragon"	23	22	24	25	33	Ret	30	Ret	Ret	30	Ret	21	20	21	0
36	"Hirobon"											21	31	Ret	31	0
37	Tadakazu Kojima					25	29	34	33	27	27	23	22	28	26	0
38	Daisuke Takaguchi					22	30									0
39	Yoshitsugu Kondo	27	28	30	35	26	Ret	29	25	25	28	Ret	23	26	Ret	0
40	Hachiro Osaka	30	29	33	26	24	24	28	26	Ret	Ret	27	29	25	24	0
41	Sergeyevich Sato	24	24	29	36											0
42	Tsuyoshi Usui			32	27							24	28			0
43	"Kentaro"	36	33	34	29	30	25	31	28	26	31	26	27	27	25	0
44	Makoto Hotta	31	25	27	30											0
45	Masayoshi Oyama	32	27	28	31	27	26	35	27	28	29	30	26	30	27	0
46	Nobuhiro Imada	26	26	Ret	DNS											0
47	"Syuji"	33	32	36	28	29	27	Ret	34	29	Ret	28	32	32	Ret	0
48	"Yugo"	38	34	37	33	32	28	32	32	30	Ret	29	33	34	30	0
49	Toshihiro Kubota													29	28	0
50	Takumi Sanada	29	31													0
50	"Daisuke"													31	29	0
52	Yasushi Ide	35	30													0
53	Isao Nakashima			31	37†											0
54	Katsunori Keihara	37	35	38	32	34	Ret									0
Pos	Driver	R1	R2	R3	R4	R5	R6	R7	R8	R9	R10	R11	R12	R13	R14	Pts
Pos	Driver	FUJ1		SUZ1		FUJ2		SUZ2		SUG		AUT		MOT		Pts

Colour	Result
Gold	Winner
Silver	Second place
Bronze	Third place
Green	Points classification
Blue	Non-points classification
Blue	Non-classified finish (NC)
Purple	Retired, not classified (Ret)
Red	Did not qualify (DNQ)
Red	Did not pre-qualify (DNPQ)
Black	Disqualified (DSQ)
White	Did not start (DNS)
White	Withdrew (WD)
White	Race cancelled (C)
Blank	Did not practice (DNP)
Blank	Did not arrive (DNA)
Blank	Excluded (EX)

**Bold** – Pole
Italics – Fastest Lap
† — Did not finish but classified

=== Independent Cup ===
Pos	Driver	FUJ1		SUZ1		FUJ2		SUZ2		SUG		AUT		MOT		Pts
Pos	Driver	R1	R2	R3	R4	R5	R6	R7	R8	R9	R10	R11	R12	R13	R14	Pts
1	Yutaka Toriba	1	1	2	1	1	1	1	1	1	1	5	5	2	1	306
2	Makio Saito	4	3	1	2	2	2	2	Ret	2	Ret	2	4	3	3	202
3	"Dragon"	2	2	3	3	10	Ret	5	Ret	Ret	5	Ret	1	1	2	155
4	Yoshitsugu Kondo	6	8	7	12	5	Ret	4	2	3	3	Ret	3	5	Ret	113
5	Hachiro Osaka	7	9	10	4	3	3	3	3	Ret	Ret	7	9	4	4	113
6	Tadakazu Kojima					4	8	8	7	5	2	3	2	7	6	101
7	"Kentaro"	12	12	11	7	8	4	6	5	4	6	6	7	6	5	92
8	Masayoshi Oyama	9	7	5	9	6	5	9	4	6	4	10	6	9	7	89
9	"Syuji"	10	11	12	6	7	6	Ret	8	7	Ret	8	11	11	Ret	37
10	Sergeyevich Sato	3	4	6	13											35
11	Makoto Hotta	8	5	4	8											30
12	"Yugo"	14	13	13	11	9	7	7	6	8	Ret	9	12	12	10	29
13	Tsuyoshi Usui			9	5							4	8			28
14	"Hirobon"											1	10	Ret	11	26
15	Nobuhiro Imada	5	6	Ret	DNS											18
16	Toshihiro Kubota													8	8	8
17	Isao Nakashima			8	14†											4
18	"Daisuke"													10	9	3
19	Katsunori Keihara	13	14	14	10	11	Ret									1
20	Yasushi Ide	11	10													1
Pos	Driver	R1	R2	R3	R4	R5	R6	R7	R8	R9	R10	R11	R12	R13	R14	Pts
Pos	Driver	FUJ1		SUZ1		FUJ2		SUZ2		SUG		AUT		MOT		Pts

=== Teams' standings ===
Only the best finisher scores points for their team.

Pos	Team	Points
1	Honda Formula Dream Project	336
2	TGR-DC Racing School	225
3	Bionic Jack Racing	128
4	OTG Motor Sports	68
5	HELM Motorsports	55
6	Skill Speed	54
7	Buzz Racing	44
8	Media Do Kageyama Racing	18
9	Hitotsuyama Racing	8
10	Team Hero's	6
11	Zap Speed	5
12	B-Max Racing Team	2
