= Yusuke Mitsui =

Japanese racing driver

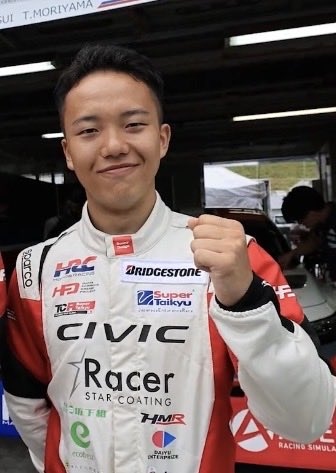
- Mitsui in 2023
- Nationality: (Japan) Japanese
- Born: 22 April 2002 (age 24) Saitama, Japan

Previous series
- 2024 2022-23: Super GT - GT300; F4 Japanese Championship

Yusuke Mitsui (三井 優介, Mitsui Yusuke; born 22 April 2002) is a Japanese racing driver. He finished runner-up in the 2022 F4 Japanese Championship. He was a member of the Honda Formula Dream Project.

== Career ==
=== Formula 4 ===
In 2022, Mitsui made his single-seater racing debut by competing in the F4 Japanese Championship. He joined the Honda Formula Dream Project team alongside Syun Koide, and Kazuma Nishimura. He won the opening race of the season, and he collected two more wins along with eight more podiums to finish runner-up to teammate Koide. For 2023, Mitsui stayed in F4 to fight for the title alongside Yuto Nomura, and rookie Tosei Moriyama. Mitsui ended up finishing third place in the standings to runners-up Jin Nakamura, and the eventual champion Rikuto Kobayashi.

=== Super GT ===
Mitsui would take up a role as the third driver for Team UpGarage in 2024. He did not make a single race in that season.

=== Super Formula Lights ===
Mitsui joined new team Delightworks Racing for his Super Formula Lights debut in 2025.

=== Super Taikyu ===
Mitsui also made his debut in Super Taikyu with Honda's M&K Racing in 2023. Mitsui then raced for Team Spoon in the ST-2 class in 2024, and one race appearance with Honda's HRC Team in ST-Q.

== Racing record ==
=== Career summary ===
Season	Series	Team	Races	Wins	Poles	FLaps	Podiums	Points	Position
2022	F4 Japanese Championship	Honda Formula Dream Project	14	3	2	1	11	246	**2nd**
2022	Super Taikyu - ST-TCR	M&K Honda Cars Okegawa Racing	3	1	2	2	3	116‡	**2nd‡**
2023	F4 Japanese Championship	Honda Formula Dream Project	14	4	4	3	7	181	**3rd**
2023	Super Taikyu - ST-TCR	M&K Racing	1	1	1	1	1	88‡	**1st‡**
2024	Super GT - GT300	Team UpGarage	5	0	0	0	0	0	NC
2024	Super Taikyu - ST-2	Team Spoon	4	1	0	0	1	73‡	6th‡
2024	Super Taikyu - ST-Q	Team HRC	1	0	1	0	1	0‡	NC‡
2025	Super Formula Lights	Delightworks Racing	18	0	0	0	1	32	6th
2025	Super Taikyu - ST-2	Team Spoon	1	0	0	0	1	84.5‡	4th‡
2026	Super Formula Lights	Delightworks Racing	18	5	3	5	11	95.5	**2nd**
2026	Super Taikyu - ST-2	Team Spoon							
2026	Super GT - GT300	Anest Iwata Racing	3	0	0	0	0	11	34th

^{*} Season still in progress.
‡ Team standings

=== Complete F4 Japanese Championship results ===
(key) (Races in bold indicate pole position) (Races in italics indicate fastest lap)

Year	Team	1	2	3	4	5	6	7	8	9	10	11	12	13	14	DC	Points
2022	Honda Formula Dream Project	FUJ1; 2; 1	FUJ1; 1; 2	SUZ1; 1; 2	SUZ1; 2; 2	FUJ2; 1; 3	FUJ2; 2; 2	**SUZ2**; **1**; 1	**SUZ2**; **2**; 1	SUG; 1; 4	SUG; 2; 2	AUT; 1; 3	AUT; 2; 3	MOT; 1; 4	MOT; 2; 4	2nd	246
2023	Honda Formula Dream Project	FUJ1; 2 Ret	FUJ1; 1; 28	**SUZ1**; **1**; 1	**SUZ1**; **2**; 1	FUJ2; 1; 4	FUJ2; 2; 4	**SUZ2**; **1**; 1	**SUZ2**; **2**; 1	SUG; 1; 2	SUG; 2; 2	AUT; 1; 3	AUT; 2; 10	MOT; 1; 10	MOT; 2; 8	3rd	181

=== Complete Super GT results ===
(key) (Races in bold indicate pole position; races in italics indicate fastest lap)

Year	Team	Car	Class	1	2	3	4	5	6	7	8	DC	Points
2024	Team UpGarage	Honda NSX GT3 Evo	GT300	OKA	FUJ; 7†	SUZ; 13	FUJ; 16	SUG	AUT; 15	MOT	SUZ; 24	NC	0
2026	Anest Iwata Racing	Nissan Fairlady Z GT300 (RZ34)	GT300	OKA	FUJ	FUJ	SUZ	SUG	AUT; 9	MOT; DSQ	MOT; 12	34th	11

^{*} Season still in progress. ^{†} did not involve in the round thus no points rewarded.

=== Complete Super Formula Lights results ===
(key) (Races in bold indicate pole position) (Races in italics indicate fastest lap)

Year	Entrant	1	2	3	4	5	6	7	8	9	10	11	12	13	14	15	16	17	18	Pos	Points
2025	Delightworks Racing	SUZ; 1; 5	SUZ; 2; 7	SUZ; 3; 6	AUT; 1; 7	AUT; 2; 6	OKA; 1; 6	OKA; 2; 4	OKA; 3; 6	SUG; 1; 7	SUG; 2; 5	SUG; 3; 9	SUG; 4; 4	FUJ; 1; 4	FUJ; 2; 2	FUJ; 3; 13	MOT; 1; 4	MOT; 2; 4	MOT; 3; 5	6th	32
2026	Delightworks Racing	**FUJ**; **1**; 1	FUJ; 2; 2	FUJ; 3; 1	AUT; 1; 2	AUT; 2; 2	AUT; 3; 3	SUZ; 1 Ret	SUZ; 2; 9	SUZ; 3; 6	**OKA**; **1**; 1	**OKA**; **2**; 1	OKA; 3; 1	SUG; 1; 4	SUG; 2; 7	SUG; 3; 3	MOT; 1; 5	MOT; 2; 6	MOT; 3; 2	2nd	95.5

^{*} Season still in progress.
