= 2024 Super Formula Lights =

Formula racing championship

The 2024 Super Formula Lights Championship was the fifth Super Formula Lights Championship season, after the Japanese Formula 3 Championship was rebranded following the end of the 2019 season.

Syun Koide, driving for B-Max Racing Team, won the Drivers' Championship with two races to spare, while TOM's, the team of runner-up Rikuto Kobayashi, won the Teams' Championship. Ryuji "Dragon" Kumita, driving for his eponymous Team Dragon, became Masters' Winner for the first time since 2020 when his closest competitor Nobuhiro Imada, the Masters' Winner in every season since 2020, did not enter the final round.

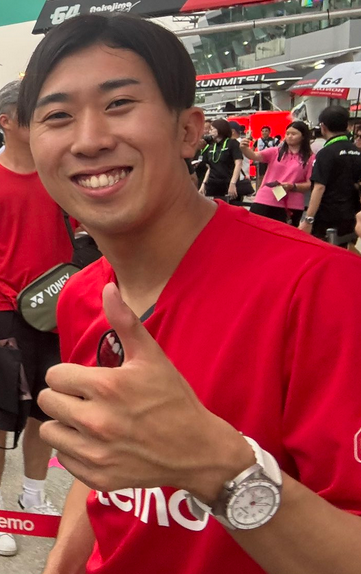
Syun Koide (pictured in 2025), driving for B-Max Racing Team, won the Super Formula Lights title.

== Teams and drivers ==
After being a multi-engine championship throughout all of its history, dating back to 1979, this changed in 2024 with the introduction of a spec Toyota engine developed by TOM'S and based on the Toyota GR Yaris three cylinder 1.6-litre turbo engine. This change coincided with the introduction of a new chassis, the Dallara 324, after four years of using the Dallara 320, and with a change of tyre supplier from Yokohama to Kumho.

Team	No.	Driver	Status	Rounds
B-Max Racing Team	1	(United States) Kaylen Frederick		All
B-Max Racing Team	50	(Japan) Syun Koide		All
B-Max Racing Team	51	(Japan) Rin Arakawa		2–4
Toda Racing	2	(Japan) Souta Arao		All
JMS Racing Team	4	(Japan) Nobuhiro Imada	M	1–5
JMS Racing Team	4	(Japan) Togo Suganami		6
Albirex Racing Team	5	(Japan) Tsubasa Iriyama		5–6
GNSY Racing	8	(Japan) Yasuhiro Shimizu	M	All
Team Dragon	13	(Japan) Rin Arakawa		1, 6
Team Dragon	13	(Japan) Makoto Fujiwara	M	2–5
Team Dragon	30	(Japan) "Dragon"	M	All
TOM'S	35	(Japan) Jin Nakamura		All
TOM'S	36	(Japan) Seita Nonaka		All
TOM'S	37	(Japan) Yuga Furutani		All
TOM'S	38	(Japan) Rikuto Kobayashi		All
LM corsa	60	(Japan) Reimei Ito		4, 6

Icon	Class
M	Masters' Cup

=== Team changes ===
B-Max Racing Team saw its six-car operation split up into four different entries: The No. 4 and No. 8 cars were run under the "JMS Racing Team" and "GNSY Racing" banners respectively, the No. 13 and No. 30 cars were fielded under the "Team Dragon" guise and the No. 1 and No. 50 remained under the B-Max Racing Team name.

Rn-sports left the championship after having competed in every Super Formula Lights season.

==== Mid-season ====
Super GT GT300 team LM corsa made their series debut at Okayama and Motegi.

Albirex Racing Team returned to Super Formula Lights for the final two rounds after last competing in 2021.

=== Driver changes ===
Reigning Teams' Champion B-Max Racing Team signed two new drivers in its core program under the B-Max name. 2023 champion Iori Kimura stepped up to the teams' Super Formula outfit, with his seat in the No. 50 car filled by Syun Koide, who departed Toda Racing after coming third in his debut season with the team. The No. 1 car was driven by Kaylen Frederick, who made his debut in Japan after coming 21st with ART Grand Prix in the 2023 FIA Formula 3 Championship, while Igor Fraga and David Vidales left the championship after coming fourth and ninth in 2023, respectively. Fraga focused on his reserve driver duties for PONOS Nakajima Racing in Super Formula and his Super GT program with Anest Iwata Racimg by Arnage, while Vidales joined AF Corse for the GT World Challenge Europe Endurance Cup. Togo Suganami and Takashi Hata, who did three and four rounds with the team in 2023 respectively, did not return.

The two cars under the Team Dragon banner were piloted by B-Max Team Owner "Dragon" and Rin Arakawa, who embarked on a part-time campaign after coming sixth in the previous year's F4 Japanese Championship. Arakawa shared the car with Masters' Class driver Makoto Fujiwara, the 2023 F4 Japanese Championship Independent Cup champion. In B-Max Racings two other satellite entries, Nobuhiro Imada continued to pilot the No. 4 car, albeit under the JMS Racing Team name, and Yasuhiro Shimizu, who last raced in the Super GT GT300 Class in 2011, joined GNSY Racing.

TOM'S signed two Toyota juniors in 2023 F4 Japanese champion Rikuto Kobayashi and runner-up Jin Nakamura. Both rookies replaced last season's runner-up Hibiki Taira, who continued driving in the Super GT series' GT300 class with INGING, and Enzo Trulli, who joined Easy Race in the Italian GT Sprint Championship.

Souta Arao took over Syun Koide's former seat at Toda Racing, returning to Japan after a stint in GB3 with Hitech Pulse-Eight, where he came 17th.

After raced for 4 rounds last year with Rn-sports, Yuui Tsutsumi continued to driving in Super GT's GT300 class with INGING alongside Taira.

==== Mid-season ====
Makoto Fujiwara took over the No. 13 Dragon Racing car from round 2 onwards, and Rin Arakawa switched to B-Max Racing as the team entered a third car from that round on.

Former Japanese F4 and Super GT driver Reimei Ito competed with Super GT team LM corsa at the rounds at Okayama and Motegi, with both driver and team making their series debut.

Tsubasa Iriyama, who raced with ALBIREX Racing Team for 2020 and 2021, returned to the series for the final two rounds, while Rin Arakawa left B-Max Racing and the series ahead of the round at Suzuka.

Togo Suganami returned to the series where he came sixth in a part-time campaign in 2023 to replace Nobuhiro Imada at JMS Racing Team for the final round. Rin Arakawa meanwhile returned to Team Dragon, the team he drove for at Autopolis at the start of the year, in place of Makoto Fujiwara.

== Race calendar ==
The calendar for the 2024 season was announced on 24 November 2023. It once again consisted of eighteen races held over six weekends at six circuits. Four of the events supported the parent Super Formula Championship. When the Super Formula season finale was brought forwards by two weeks, the Super Formula Lights amended its calendar accordingly. The season opener, scheduled to be held over the last weekend in April at Mobility Resort Motegi, was cancelled two weeks prior to the event after issues with the new spec engine in combination with the new Dallara chassis arose. The first round was initially rescheduled to December, before being changed again to late November to avoid a clash with Super GT.

Round		Circuit	Date	Supporting	Map of circuit locations
1	R4	Autopolis, Hita	18 May	Super Formula Championship; Honda N-One Owner's Cup	2024 Super Formula Lights is located in Japan
1	R5	Autopolis, Hita	19 May	Super Formula Championship; Honda N-One Owner's Cup	2024 Super Formula Lights is located in Japan
1	R6	Autopolis, Hita	19 May	Super Formula Championship; Honda N-One Owner's Cup	2024 Super Formula Lights is located in Japan
2	R7	Sportsland Sugo, Murata	22 June	Super Formula Championship; Honda N-One Owner's Cup	2024 Super Formula Lights is located in Japan
2	R8	Sportsland Sugo, Murata	23 June	Super Formula Championship; Honda N-One Owner's Cup	2024 Super Formula Lights is located in Japan
2	R9	Sportsland Sugo, Murata	23 June	Super Formula Championship; Honda N-One Owner's Cup	2024 Super Formula Lights is located in Japan
3	R10	Fuji Speedway, Oyama	20 July	Super Formula Championship; Porsche Carrera Cup Japan; Kyojo Cup	2024 Super Formula Lights is located in Japan
3	R11	Fuji Speedway, Oyama	20 July	Super Formula Championship; Porsche Carrera Cup Japan; Kyojo Cup	2024 Super Formula Lights is located in Japan
3	R12	Fuji Speedway, Oyama	21 July	Super Formula Championship; Porsche Carrera Cup Japan; Kyojo Cup	2024 Super Formula Lights is located in Japan
4	R13	Okayama International Circuit, Mimasaka	14 September	Toyota Gazoo Racing GR86/BRZ Cup; SuperKart Okayama International Series; Roadster Party Race; N Zero Yaris	2024 Super Formula Lights is located in Japan
4	R14	Okayama International Circuit, Mimasaka	15 September	Toyota Gazoo Racing GR86/BRZ Cup; SuperKart Okayama International Series; Roadster Party Race; N Zero Yaris	2024 Super Formula Lights is located in Japan
4	R15	Okayama International Circuit, Mimasaka	15 September	Toyota Gazoo Racing GR86/BRZ Cup; SuperKart Okayama International Series; Roadster Party Race; N Zero Yaris	2024 Super Formula Lights is located in Japan
5	R16	Suzuka International Racing Course, Suzuka	9 November	Super Formula Championship	2024 Super Formula Lights is located in Japan
5	R17	Suzuka International Racing Course, Suzuka	10 November	Super Formula Championship	2024 Super Formula Lights is located in Japan
5	R18	Suzuka International Racing Course, Suzuka	10 November	Super Formula Championship	2024 Super Formula Lights is located in Japan
6	R1	Mobility Resort Motegi, Motegi	30 November	TCR Japan Touring Car Series	2024 Super Formula Lights is located in Japan
6	R2	Mobility Resort Motegi, Motegi	1 December	TCR Japan Touring Car Series	2024 Super Formula Lights is located in Japan
6	R3	Mobility Resort Motegi, Motegi	1 December	TCR Japan Touring Car Series	2024 Super Formula Lights is located in Japan

== Race results ==
Round		Circuit	Pole position	Fastest lap	Winning driver	Winning team	Masters winner
1	R4	Autopolis	(Japan) Rikuto Kobayashi	(Japan) Seita Nonaka	(Japan) Seita Nonaka	TOM'S	(Japan) Nobuhiro Imada
1	R5	Autopolis	(Japan) Syun Koide	(Japan) Syun Koide	(Japan) Syun Koide	B-Max Racing Team	(Japan) Nobuhiro Imada
1	R6	Autopolis		(Japan) Seita Nonaka	(Japan) Seita Nonaka	TOM'S	(Japan) Nobuhiro Imada
2	R7	Sportsland Sugo	(Japan) Syun Koide	(Japan) Syun Koide	(Japan) Syun Koide	B-Max Racing Team	(Japan) Nobuhiro Imada
2	R8	Sportsland Sugo	(United States) Kaylen Frederick	(Japan) Jin Nakamura	(Japan) Jin Nakamura	TOM'S	(Japan) "Dragon"
2	R9	Sportsland Sugo		(Japan) Jin Nakamura	(Japan) Seita Nonaka	TOM'S	(Japan) "Dragon"
3	R10	Fuji Speedway	(Japan) Jin Nakamura	(Japan) Syun Koide	(Japan) Syun Koide	B-Max Racing Team	(Japan) Makoto Fujiwara
3	R11	Fuji Speedway	(Japan) Rikuto Kobayashi	(Japan) Rikuto Kobayashi	(Japan) Rikuto Kobayashi	TOM'S	(Japan) Makoto Fujiwara
3	R12	Fuji Speedway		(Japan) Syun Koide	(Japan) Syun Koide	B-Max Racing Team	(Japan) "Dragon"
4	R13	Okayama International Circuit	(Japan) Syun Koide	(Japan) Syun Koide	(Japan) Syun Koide	B-Max Racing Team	(Japan) Makoto Fujiwara
4	R14	Okayama International Circuit	(Japan) Syun Koide	(Japan) Souta Arao	(United States) Kaylen Frederick	B-Max Racing Team	(Japan) "Dragon"
4	R15	Okayama International Circuit		(Japan) Syun Koide	(Japan) Syun Koide	B-Max Racing Team	(Japan) "Dragon"
5	R16	Suzuka International Racing Course	(Japan) Seita Nonaka	(Japan) Seita Nonaka	(Japan) Seita Nonaka	TOM'S	(Japan) Yashuhiro Shimizu
5	R17	Suzuka International Racing Course	(Japan) Jin Nakamura	(Japan) Seita Nonaka	(Japan) Rikuto Kobayashi	TOM'S	(Japan) Nobuhiro Imada
5	R18	Suzuka International Racing Course		(Japan) Seita Nonaka	(Japan) Seita Nonaka	TOM'S	(Japan) Nobuhiro Imada
6	R1	Mobility Resort Motegi	(Japan) Syun Koide	(Japan) Rikuto Kobayashi	(Japan) Syun Koide	B-Max Racing Team	(Japan) "Dragon"
6	R2	Mobility Resort Motegi	(Japan) Syun Koide	(Japan) Rikuto Kobayashi	(Japan) Rikuto Kobayashi	TOM'S	(Japan) "Dragon"
6	R3	Mobility Resort Motegi		(Japan) Syun Koide	(Japan) Syun Koide	B-Max Racing Team	(Japan) "Dragon"

== Season report ==
The 2024 Super Formula Lights season began at Autopolis after the original season opener was postponed, and Rikuto Kobayashi (TOM'S) and Syun Koide (B-Max Racing) shared pole positions in qualifying. Kobayashi initially led the first race despite a slow start, but his teammate Seita Nonaka overtook him on a safety car restart on lap three. He went on to win, while B-Max Racing’s Rin Arakawa came third. Race two saw Koide take a lights-to-flag victory as Kobayashi stalled his car at the start. The ensuing chaos promoted Nonaka from sixth to second, before Arakawa overtook him to claim the place later on. Nonaka started the third race from the front and remained there until the finish to leave Autopolis in the lead of the championship. B-Max Racing’s Kaylen Frederick leapt from fourth to second at the start and spent the rest of the race defending from Kobayashi.

Koide and Frederick were fastest in the two qualifying sessions held at Sportsland Sugo. The former converted his pole position into victory in the first race. TOM’S driver Jin Nakamura took third at the start and pressured Frederick for second. The American then sustained a puncture, handing Nakamura second and promoting Arakawa onto the podium. Wet weather hit the track Sunday, prompting a safety car start for race two. Frederick then ran wide and lost the lead to Nakamura. He remained second until Koide tried to pass him and was shoved off track. That saw Toda Racing’s Souta Arao move through as Frederick was handed a penalty that handed Kobayashi third. Race three saw Nonaka claim the lead from third at the start. He led Koide and Nakamura until the safety car ended the race early due to fog, defending his championship lead in the process.

Round three at Fuji Speedway began with Nakamura and Kobayashi setting the pace in qualifying. The former had a bad start to race one and was overtaken by Koide on the inside for the lead and Arakawa on the outside for second. TOM'S driver Yuga Furutani followed through to take third later on in lap one, and the order remained the same until the finish. Race two saw Kobayashi able to hold his lead at the start, with Nakamura establishing himself in second. Arao spent the race defending third from Arakawa and Koide, but was released when the latter dropped behind Nonaka and a fight for fourth broke out. Race three saw Koide turn his first place on the grid into the lead as Furutani and Arakawa fought over second. The latter won that battle, and Furutani then also dropped behind Nonaka, whose third place still saw him lose the championship lead to Koide.

The second half of the season began at Okayama International Circuit with Koide taking both pole positions. He then delivered a faultless performance in the first race to take an unchallenged victory. Frederick was second all race, with Kobayashi in third shadowing him, but never coming close enough to attempt an overtake. Race two, held in the wet, saw Frederick overtake Koide on the first lap to claim the lead. He held on through two safety car restarts to claim his maiden SFL win by just over a second. Furutani came third, profiting from a collision further up the order. Race three mirrored race one as Koide sailed away at the front towards another victory and Frederick in second was unable to keep up with the leader, but had no major pressure from Kobayashi behind. Two wins for Koide, coupled with a retirement for Nonaka, saw the former open up a 33-point lead.

Suzuka hosted the penultimate round, where Nonaka and Nakamura shared pole positions. The first race saw Nonaka lead Arao all race, with the latter closely following the leader to finish only 0.4 seconds behind. Third place was debated between Nakamura and Kobayashi, with the former falling to fourth after a slow start. He pressured Kobayashi, but was unable to find a way back into third. Race two saw Nakamura have another bad start as he dropped from first place behind Nonaka and Kobayashi. As the order stabilized behind him, Nonaka was handed a ten-second penalty for jumping the start. That saw Kobayashi inherit the win, with Nakamura classified second and Furutani third. Nonaka had pole position for race three and converted that into an unchallenged win ahead of Arao and Nakamura, shortening Koide’s championship lead to only nine points in the process.

After spending the fifth round in the lower reaches of the top five, Koide was back in front for the final weekend at Motegi as he took both pole positions. Nonaka suffered an electrical issue that saw him complete only one lap of the first race, enabling Koide, who won ahead of Kobayashi and Arakawa, to win the championship title in the process. Race two saw Kobayashi overtake Koide to claim the lead at the start. He then distanced himself from the rest of the field to claim the win, with Nakamura coming third and Nonaka finishing outside the points. Race three, once again started side-by-side by Koide and Kobayashi, saw Koide hold his lead at the start to finish his season with another win. Furutani climbed from seventh to third, but could not take second from Kobayashi. Nonaka ended a difficult weekend in sixth, thereby losing second in the standings to Kobayashi.

2024 champion Koide took eight wins and three further podiums en route to his title, with his closest challengers Kobayashi and Nonaka only claiming three and five wins respectively. Koide’s only weekend off the pace - and only weekend without a win - came at Suzuka, allowing Nonaka and Kobayashi back into contention, but clinical form at Motegi coupled with technical difficulties for Nonaka saw Koide end the title fight with two races to spare. Away from the championship fight, the series’ move to a spec Toyota engine did not bring the increase in regular entries the championship organizers hoped it would, with the car count not surpassing 13 entries at any point.

== Championship standings ==
Points were awarded as follows:

1	2	3	4	5	6	PP
10	7	5	3	2	1	**1**

=== Drivers' championships ===
==== Overall ====
Pos	Driver	AUT			SUG			FUJ			OKA			SUZ			MOT			Points
Pos	Driver	R4	R5	R6	R7	R8	R9	R10	R11	R12	R13	R14	R15	R16	R17	R18	R1	R2	R3	Points
1	(Japan) Syun Koide	5	**1**	8	**1**	8	2	1	6	1	**1**	**2**	1	6	6	5	**1**	**2**	1	114
2	(Japan) Rikuto Kobayashi	**2**	8	3	7	3	5	6	**1**	5	3	Ret	3	3	1	4	2	1	2	86
3	(Japan) Seita Nonaka	1	3	1	4	7	1	7	4	3	4	Ret	4	**1**	4	1	Ret	8	6	77
4	(Japan) Jin Nakamura	Ret	2	6	2	1	3	**5**	2	7	5	4	6	4	**2**	3	5	3	5	71
5	(United States) Kaylen Frederick	4	4	2	Ret	**5**	8	8	8	12	2	1	2	5	7	7	6	4	Ret	46
6	(Japan) Rin Arakawa	3	6	5	3	4	4	2	5	2	Ret	7	8				3	6	4	44
7	(Japan) Souta Arao	7	7	7	6	2	7	4	3	6	6	5	5	2	5	2	4	5	7	43
8	(Japan) Yuga Furutani	6	5	4	5	6	6	3	7	4	7	3	9	7	3	6	7	7	3	34
9	(Japan) Reimei Ito										8	6	7				8	10	9	1
10	(Japan) Nobuhiro Imada	8	9	9	8	10	10	12	11	9	Ret	Ret	DNS	11	8	9				0
11	(Japan) "Dragon"	9	10	10	9	9	9	10	10	8	10	8	10	10	9	11	11	12	11	0
12	(Japan) Tsubasa Iriyama													8	Ret	8	10	11	10	0
13	(Japan) Togo Suganami																9	9	8	0
14	(Japan) Makoto Fujiwara				10	12	11	9	9	11	9	9	11	12	10	12				0
15	(Japan) Yasuhiro Shimizu	10	Ret	11	11	11	12	11	12	10	11	Ret	12	9	11	10	12	13	12	0
Pos	Driver	R4	R5	R6	R7	R8	R9	R10	R11	R12	R13	R14	R15	R16	R17	R18	R1	R2	R3	Points
Pos	Driver	AUT			SUG			FUJ			OKA			SUZ			MOT			Points

==== Masters' Class ====
Pos	Driver	AUT			SUG			FUJ			OKA			SUZ			MOT			Points
Pos	Driver	R4	R5	R6	R7	R8	R9	R10	R11	R12	R13	R14	R15	R16	R17	R18	R1	R2	R3	Points
1	(Japan) "Dragon"	2	2	2	2	1	1	2	2	1	**1**	1	1	2	2	3	1	1	1	152
2	(Japan) Nobuhiro Imada	**1**	**1**	1	**1**	**2**	2	4	**3**	2	Ret	Ret	DNS	3	1	1				99
3	(Japan) Yasuhiro Shimizu	3	Ret	3	4	3	4	**3**	4	3	3	**Ret**	3	**1**	**4**	2	**2**	**2**	2	91
4	(Japan) Makoto Fujiwara				3	4	3	1	1	4	2	2	2	4	3	4				68
Pos	Driver	R4	R5	R6	R7	R8	R9	R10	R11	R12	R13	R14	R15	R16	R17	R18	R1	R2	R3	Points
Pos	Driver	AUT			SUG			FUJ			OKA			SUZ			MOT			Points

Key
Colour	Result
Gold	Winner
Silver	Second place
Bronze	Third place
Green	Other points position
Blue	Other classified position
Blue	Not classified, finished (NC)
Purple	Not classified, retired (Ret)
Red	Did not qualify (DNQ)
Red	Did not pre-qualify (DNPQ)
Black	Disqualified (DSQ)
White	Did not start (DNS)
White	Race cancelled (C)
Blank	Did not practice (DNP)
Blank	Excluded (EX)
Blank	Did not arrive (DNA)
Blank	Withdrawn (WD)
Blank	Did not enter (cell empty)
Text formatting	Meaning
**Bold**	Pole position
Italics	Fastest lap

=== Teams' standings ===
Only a teams' best finishing driver was eligible for points.

Pos	Driver	AUT			SUG			FUJ			OKA			SUZ			MOT			Points
Pos	Driver	R4	R5	R6	R7	R8	R9	R10	R11	R12	R13	R14	R15	R16	R17	R18	R1	R2	R3	Points
1	TOM'S	1	2	1	2	1	1	3	1	3	3	3	3	1	1	1	2	1	2	143
2	B-Max Racing Team	4	1	2	1	4	2	1	5	1	1	1	1	5	6	5	1	2	1	124
3	Toda Racing	7	7	7	6	2	7	4	3	6	6	5	5	2	5	2	4	5	7	43
4	Team Dragon	3	6	5	9	9	9	9	9	8	9	8	10	10	9	11	3	6	4	17
5	LM corsa										8	6	7				8	10	9	1
6	JMS Racing Team	8	9	9	8	10	10	11	11	9	Ret	Ret	DNS	11	8	9	9	9	8	0
7	ALBIREX Racing Team													8	Ret	8	10	11	10	0
8	GNSY Racing	10	Ret	11	11	11	12	11	12	10	11	Ret	12	9	12	10	12	13	11	0
Pos	Driver	R4	R5	R6	R7	R8	R9	R10	R11	R12	R13	R14	R15	R16	R17	R18	R1	R2	R3	Points
Pos	Driver	AUT			SUG			FUJ			OKA			SUZ			MOT			Points
