= Kotaro Shimbara =

Japanese racing driver (born 2004)

- Nationality: (Japan) Japanese
- Born: 12 April 2004 (age 22) Hyōgo, Japan

Super Formula Lights career
- Debut season: 2026
- Current team: B-Max Racing Team
- Car number: 50
- Starts: 18
- Wins: 1
- Podiums: 6
- Poles: 2
- Fastest laps: 2

Previous series
- 2021-2025: F4 Japanese
- Statistics up to date as of 22 September 2026.

Kotaro Shimbara (新原 光太郎, Shinbara Kōtarō; born 12 April 2004) is a Japanese racing driver who competes in the Super Formula Lights and Super Gt with B-Max Racing Team and TeamUp Garage respectively.

He previously raced in the F4 Japanese Championship from 2021 to 2025, finishing third in 2024.

== Career ==
=== Formula 4 ===
Shimbara made his racing debut in 2021 race in F4 Japan with TOM'S backed RSS team from the third round onwards. He finished fourteenth in the standings.

Shimbara made his full season debut in Japanese F4 with Zap Speed in 2022. He finished twentiethin the standings with one podium. In 2024, he returned to the series, racing with Kageyama Racing. He claimed pole in the first race, and a win after Ryota Horachi was disqualified in the last race at Suzuka. For 2025, he would stay in the series, moving to HFDP with B-Max Racing Team after winning the Honda Racing School scholarship with Rintaro Sato.

== Personal life ==
Shimbara interested to become a racing driver by riding a rental cart at the race cart run by a friend of his father when he was five years old. In Nada Junior High and High School, he joined the rugby club for the purpose of building up his physical strength. He also entered the University of Tokyo in 2023, where he studies economics.

== Racing record ==
=== Racing career summary ===
| Season | Series | Team | Races | Wins | Poles | FLaps | Podiums | Points | Position |
|---|---|---|---|---|---|---|---|---|---|
| 2021 | F4 Japanese Championship | RSS | 9 | 0 | 0 | 1 | 0 | 3 | 14th |
| 2022 | F4 Japanese Championship | Zap Speed | 14 | 0 | 0 | 0 | 0 | 5 | 20th |
| 2024 | F4 Japanese Championship | HYDRANGEA Kageyama Racing | 13 | 1 | 1 | 0 | 5 | 153 | **3rd** |
| 2025 | F4 Japanese Championship | HFDP with B-Max Racing Team | 14 | 2 | 3 | 1 | 5 | 127 | 4th |
| 2026 | Super Formula Lights | B-Max Racing Team | 18 | 1 | 2 | 2 | 6 | 51 | 5th |
| 2026 | Super GT - GT300 | Team UpGarage | 8 | 0 | 0 | 0 | 1 | 47 | 13th |
| 2026 | Super Taikyu - ST-Q | Team HRC | 2 | 1 | 2 | 1 | 1 | 0 | NC* |

* Season still in progress.

=== Complete F4 Japanese Championship results ===
(key) (Races in bold indicate pole position) (Races in italics indicate fastest lap)

| Year | Team | 1 | 2 | 3 | 4 | 5 | 6 | 7 | 8 | 9 | 10 | 11 | 12 | 13 | 14 | DC | Pts |
|---|---|---|---|---|---|---|---|---|---|---|---|---|---|---|---|---|---|
| 2021 | RSS | FUJ1; 1 | FUJ1; 2 | SUZ; 1 | SUZ; 2 | MOT1; 1; 13 | MOT1; 2 Ret | MOT1; 3; 11 | SUG; 1 DNS | SUG; 2; 11 | SUG; 3; 24 | MOT2; 1; 10 | MOT2; 2; 14 | FUJ2; 1 DSQ | FUJ2; 2; 9 | 14th | 3 |
| 2022 | Zap Speed | FUJ1; 1; 13 | FUJ1; 2; 11 | SUZ; 1; 14 | SUZ; 2; 12 | FUJ2; 1; 15 | FUJ2; 2; 10 | SUZ2; 1; 12 | SUZ2; 2; 8 | SUG; 1; 15 | SUG; 2; 17 | AUT; 1; 13 | AUT; 2; 13 | MOT; 1; 12 | MOT; 2; 33† | 20th | 5 |
| 2024 | HYDRANGEA Kageyama Racing | **FUJ1**; **1** Ret | FUJ1; 2; 4 | SUZ; 1; 3 | SUZ; 2; 4 | FUJ2; 1; 7 | FUJ2; 2; 4 | SUG; 1; 9 | SUG; 2; 8 | AUT; 1; 3 | MOT; 1; 7 | MOT; 2; 2 | MOT; 3; 2 | SUZ2; 1; 4 | SUZ2; 2; 1 | 3rd | 153 |
| 2025 | HFDP with B-Max Racing Team | FUJ1; 1; 21 | FUJ1; 2; 6 | FUJ1; 3; 13 | FUJ2; 1; 2 | FUJ2; 2; 2 | **SUZ**; **1**; 2 | **SUZ**; **2**; 1 | SUG; 1; 13 | SUG; 1; 5 | SUG; 2; 16 | AUT; 1; 8 | AUT; 2; 8 | **MOT**; **1**; 1 | MOT; 2; 7 | 4th | 127 |

=== Complete Super Formula Lights results ===
(key) (Races in bold indicate pole position) (Races in italics indicate fastest lap)

| Year | Entrant | 1 | 2 | 3 | 4 | 5 | 6 | 7 | 8 | 9 | 10 | 11 | 12 | 13 | 14 | 15 | 16 | 17 | 18 | Pos | Points |
|---|---|---|---|---|---|---|---|---|---|---|---|---|---|---|---|---|---|---|---|---|---|
| 2026 | B-Max Racing Team | FUJ; 1; 10 | FUJ; 2; 6 | FUJ; 3; 7 | **AUT**; **1**; 1 | **AUT**; **2**; 5 | AUT; 3; 2 | SUZ; 1; 3 | SUZ; 2; 8 | SUZ; 3 Ret | OKA; 1; 7 | OKA; 2; 4 | OKA; 3; 6 | SUG; 1; 3 | SUG; 2; 5 | SUG; 3 Ret | MOT; 1; 3 | MOT; 2; 2 | MOT; 3; 6 | 5th | 51 |

=== Complete Super GT results ===
(key) (Races in bold indicate pole position; races in italics indicate fastest lap)

| Year | Team | Car | Class | 1 | 2 | 3 | 4 | 5 | 6 | 7 | 8 | DC | Points |
|---|---|---|---|---|---|---|---|---|---|---|---|---|---|
| 2026 | Team UpGarage | Mercedes-AMG GT3 Evo | GT300 | OKA; 18 | FUJ; 27† | FUJ; 12 | SUZ; 3 | SUG; 5 | AUT; 5 | MOT; 23† | MOT; 11 | 13th | 47 |

* Season still in progress.
