= 2024 F4 Japanese Championship =

Formula 4 championship

The 2024 F4 Japanese Championship season was the tenth season of the F4 Japanese Championship. It began on 3 May at Fuji Speedway and finished on 8 December at Suzuka International Racing Course.

This was the first season for the second-generation MCSC-24 chassis constructed by Toray Carbon Magic, and the new TOM'S TMA43 engine which produces 180 horsepower, 20 more than its predecessor.

== Teams and drivers ==
All teams were compete with an identical Toray Carbon Magic MCSC-24 chassis and TOM'S 2-litre naturally aspirated engine.

Team	No.	Driver	Rounds
Champion Class
Akiland Racing	2	(Japan) Aoto Nagahara	5
Akiland Racing	90	(China) Lin Chenghua	All
Rn-sports	10	(Japan) Hibiki Komatsu	1
Zap Speed	14	(Japan) Masaki Murata	All
HYDRANGEA Kageyama Racing	16	(Japan) Kotaro Shimbara	All
Falcon Motorsport	26	(Japan) Takumi Saigusa	1–3, 6–7
Drago Corse	33	(Japan) Itsuki Sato	All
Drago Corse	34	(Japan) Hironobu Shimizu	All
TGR-DC Racing School	35	(Japan) Yuki Sano	All
TGR-DC Racing School	36	(Japan) Kazuhisa Urabe	All
TGR-DC Racing School	37	(Japan) Tokiya Suzuki	All
TGR-DC Racing School	38	(Japan) Kiyoshi Umegaki	All
PONOS Racing	45	(Japan) Kento Omiya	All
PONOS Racing	54	(Japan) Rintaro Sato	All
Fujita Pharmacy Racing	46	(Japan) Shouma Arimura	All
HFDP with B-Max Racing Team	50	(Japan) Yuto Nomura	All
HFDP with B-Max Racing Team	51	(Japan) Ryota Horachi	All
TGM Grand Prix	53	(Japan) Shota Sakai	7
OTG Motor Sports	60	(Japan) Kenta Kumagai	All
HELM Motorsports	62	(Japan) Tosei Moriyama	All
HELM Motorsports	64	(Japan) "Hirobon"	1–2, 5
HELM Motorsports	64	(Chinese Taipei) Ethan Ho	3
Skill Speed	77	(Japan) Daiki Matsuda	1–4, 7
Dr.Dry	87	(Japan) Rio Shimono	All
Bionic Jack Racing	97	(Japan) Ryo Shirasaki	All
Independent Class
Akiland Racing	2	(Japan) Keiji Nakao	1–3
Akiland Racing	71	(Japan) Masayoshi Oyama	All
Akiland Racing	96	(Japan) Makio Saito	All
DayDream Racing	4	(Japan) Yuichi Sasaki	All
Team 5ZIGEN	5	(Japan) Motohiro Kotani	All
Buzz Racing	9	(Japan) "Ken Alex"	All
Rn-sports	10	(Japan) Isao Nakashima	2–7
Rn-sports	11	(Japan) Masayuki Ueda	All
Eagle Sports	21	(Japan) Tadakazu Kojima	7
Eagle Sports	40	(Japan) Shoichiro Akamatsu	All
N-SPEED	23	(Japan) "Yugo”	All
B-Max Racing Team	30	(Japan) "Dragon"	All
B-Max Racing Team	44	(Japan) Nobuhiro Imada	All
Field Motorsports	55	(Japan) "Kentaro"	All
Zap Speed	57	(Japan) Anri Sugihara	6
HELM Motorsports	61	(United States) William Sakai	1–3, 7
HELM Motorsports	63	(Japan) Yutaka Toriba	All
Dr.Dry	86	(Japan) Hachiro Osaka	All
Bionic Jack Racing	98	(Japan) "Ikari"	All

== Race calendar and results ==
All rounds were held in Japan and supported the Super GT events. On 28 August 2024, it was announced that the 2nd Suzuka round was postponed to 7–8 December due to the threat of Typhoon Shanshan. After Race 11 was not held due to bad weather in Autopolis, the race was moved to the Mobility Resort Motegi round.

Round		Circuit	Date	Pole position	Fastest lap	Winning driver	Winning team	Independent Class winner
1	R1	Fuji Speedway, Oyama	3 May	(Japan) Kotaro Shimbara	(Japan) Ryota Horachi	(Japan) Yuki Sano	TGR-DC Racing School	(Japan) "Dragon"
1	R2	Fuji Speedway, Oyama	4 May	(Japan) Tosei Moriyama	(Japan) Hironobu Shimizu	(Japan) Tosei Moriyama	HELM Motorsports	(Japan) "Kentaro"
2	R3	Suzuka International Racing Course, Suzuka	1 June	(Japan) Yuto Nomura	(Japan) Ryota Horachi	(Japan) Yuto Nomura	HFDP with B-Max Racing Team	(Japan) Nobuhiro Imada
2	R4	Suzuka International Racing Course, Suzuka	2 June	(Japan) Yuto Nomura	(Japan) Tosei Moriyama	(Japan) Yuto Nomura	HFDP with B-Max Racing Team	(Japan) "Dragon"
3	R5	Fuji Speedway, Oyama	3 August	(Japan) Ryota Horachi	(Japan) Ryota Horachi	(Japan) Ryota Horachi	HFDP with B-Max Racing Team	(Japan) Yutaka Toriba
3	R6	Fuji Speedway, Oyama	4 August	(Japan) Ryota Horachi	(Japan) Ryota Horachi	(Japan) Hironobu Shimizu	Drago Corse	(Japan) "Kentaro"
4	R9	Sportsland Sugo, Murata	21 September	(Japan) Yuki Sano	(Japan) Kento Omiya	(Japan) Yuki Sano	TGR-DC Racing School	(Japan) Nobuhiro Imada
4	R10	Sportsland Sugo, Murata	22 September	(Japan) Yuki Sano	(Japan) Yuki Sano	(Japan) Yuki Sano	TGR-DC Racing School	(Japan) Nobuhiro Imada
5	R11	Autopolis, Hita	19 October	The race was cancelled due to severe bad weather. The race was rescheduled to the next round in Motegi.				
5	R12	Autopolis, Hita	20 October	(Japan) Yuto Nomura	(Japan) Yuto Nomura	(Japan) Yuto Nomura	HFDP with B-Max Racing Team	(Japan) "Dragon"
6	R11	Mobility Resort Motegi, Motegi	2 November	(Japan) Ryota Horachi	(Japan) Kiyoshi Umegaki	(Japan) Yuto Nomura	HFDP with B-Max Racing Team	(Japan) "Dragon"
6	R13	Mobility Resort Motegi, Motegi	2 November	(Japan) Ryota Horachi	(Japan) Yuto Nomura	(Japan) Yuto Nomura	HFDP with B-Max Racing Team	(Japan) Nobuhiro Imada
6	R14	Mobility Resort Motegi, Motegi	3 November		(Japan) Yuto Nomura	(Japan) Yuto Nomura	HFDP with B-Max Racing Team	(Japan) "Dragon"
7	R7	Suzuka International Racing Course, Suzuka	7 December	(Japan) Ryota Horachi	(Japan) Yuto Nomura	(Japan) Yuto Nomura	HFDP with B-Max Racing Team	(Japan) Yutaka Toriba
7	R8	Suzuka International Racing Course, Suzuka	8 December	(Japan) Ryota Horachi	(Japan) Tosei Moriyama	(Japan) Kotaro Shimbara (Note: Ryota Horachi finished first on track, but was later disqualified. Kotaro Shimbara, initially classified second, inherited the win.)	HYDRANGEA Kageyama Racing	(Japan) Yutaka Toriba

== Championship standings ==
Points were awarded as follows:

Position	**1st**	**2nd**	**3rd**	**4th**	**5th**	**6th**	**7th**	**8th**	**9th**	**10th**
Points	25	18	15	12	10	8	6	4	2	1

=== Drivers' standings ===
==== Champion Class ====
Pos	Driver	FUJ1		SUZ1		FUJ2		SUG		AUT		MOT			SUZ2		Pts
Pos	Driver	R1	R2	R3	R4	R5	R6	R9	R10 (Note: The race was abandoned due to bad weather conditions before 75% of the race was completed. Therefore, half points were awarded for the Independent Class. In the Champion Class no points were awarded because only two laps were completed.)	R11	R12	R11	R13	R14	R7	R8	Pts
1	(Japan) Yuto Nomura	2	DNS	**1**	**1**	3	8	7	4	C	**1**	1	1	1	1	2	236
2	(Japan) Ryota Horachi	3	DNS	2	3	**1**	**2**	8	5	C	4	**2**	**3**	4	**3**	**DSQ**	167
3	(Japan) Kotaro Shimbara	**Ret**	4	3	4	7	4	9	8	C	3	7	2	2	4	1	153
4	(Japan) Yuki Sano	1	DNS	11	6	10	7	**1**	**1**	C	2	3	7	3	2	5	147
5	(Japan) Tosei Moriyama	15	**1**	4	2	2	11	10	9	C	Ret	15	Ret	11	5	3	99
6	(Japan) Hironobu Shimizu	4	2	5	5	4	1	13	13	C	11	9	17	9	7	Ret	97
7	(Japan) Kiyoshi Umegaki	Ret	DNS	9	7	6	5	6	10	C	5	6	6	8	9	4	78
8	(Japan) Rintaro Sato	14	DNS	6	9	18	6	3	6	C	7	17	8	6	6	6	70
9	(Japan) Kento Omiya	12	DNS	7	8	11	3	2	2	C	8	4	4	17	11	Ret	68
10	(Japan) Tokiya Suzuki	7	DNS	12	13	5	16	5	7	C	6	10	16	7	16	7	47
11	(Japan) Kazuhisa Urabe	5	DNS	8	10	20	Ret	4	3	C	9	13	5	Ret	14	Ret	39
12	(Japan) Itsuki Sato	Ret	3	10	11	9	10	11	12	C	10	8	10	5	13	9	37
13	(Japan) Ryo Shirasaki	6	Ret	13	21	8	12	14	18	C	12	5	15	10	8	Ret	27
14	(Japan) Kenta Kumagai	10	5	18	12	12	9	15	19	C	15	12	Ret	12	12	8	17
15	(Japan) Takumi Saigusa	8	7	16	18	DNS	DNS					Ret	12	15	19	Ret	10
16	(Japan) Hibiki Komatsu	Ret	6														8
17	(Japan) Daiki Matsuda	9	8	20	14	14	15	16	16						WD	WD	6
18	(Japan) Rio Shimono	Ret	11	15	19	13	Ret	12	11	C	13	11	9	13	10	11	3
19	(Japan) "Hirobon"	Ret	9	14	15					C	WD						2
20	(China) Lin Chenghua	Ret	10	21	20	19	Ret	19	17	C	16	18	14	16	18	14	1
21	(Japan) Shota Sakai														15	10	1
22	(Japan) Masaki Murata	13	Ret	19	16	15	17	17	14	C	17	14	11	14	Ret	12	0
23	(Japan) Shouma Arimura	11	DNS	18	17	17	14	18	15	C	18	16	13	18	17	13	0
24	(Chinese Taipei) Ethan Ho					16	13										0
25	(Japan) Aoto Nagahara									C	14						0
Pos	Driver	R1	R2	R3	R4	R5	R6	R9	R10	R11	R12	R11	R13	R14	R7	R8	Pts
Pos	Driver	FUJ1		SUZ1		FUJ2		SUG		AUT		MOT			SUZ2		Pts

Key
Colour	Result
Gold	Winner
Silver	Second place
Bronze	Third place
Green	Other points position
Blue	Other classified position
Blue	Not classified, finished (NC)
Purple	Not classified, retired (Ret)
Red	Did not qualify (DNQ)
Red	Did not pre-qualify (DNPQ)
Black	Disqualified (DSQ)
White	Did not start (DNS)
White	Race cancelled (C)
Blank	Did not practice (DNP)
Blank	Excluded (EX)
Blank	Did not arrive (DNA)
Blank	Withdrawn (WD)
Blank	Did not enter (cell empty)
Text formatting	Meaning
**Bold**	Pole position
Italics	Fastest lap

**Bold** – Pole
Italics – Fastest Lap
† — Did not finish but classified

==== Independent Class ====
Pos	Driver	FUJ1		SUZ1		FUJ2		SUG		AUT		MOT			SUZ2		Pts
Pos	Driver	R1	R2	R3	R4	R5	R6	R9	R10	R11	R12	R11	R13	R14	R7	R8	Pts
1	(Japan) "Dragon"	**1**	**DNS**	2	**1**	9	4	3	2	C	**1**	**1**	7	1	Ret	3	202
2	(Japan) Nobuhiro Imada	WD	WD	**1**	2	5	3	**1**	**1**	C	3	2	**1**	15	2	2	199.5
3	(Japan) Makio Saito	7	2	4	5	Ret	2	11	6	C	6	4	5	4	13	6	118
4	(Japan) "Kentaro"	4	1	3	7	**2**	**1**	Ret	9	C	9	Ret	8	9	Ret	7	114
5	(Japan) Yutaka Toriba			13	6	1	Ret	7	11	C	12	9	2	13	**1**	**1**	109
6	(Japan) Masayuki Ueda	WD	WD	6	4	3	8	6	5	C	5	3	9	2	Ret	5	107
7	(Japan) Isao Nakashima			5	3	7	6	4	4	C	4	8	4	10	Ret	4	98
8	(Japan) Shoichiro Akamatsu	6	6	8	16	6	7	5	7	C	8	5	14	5	3	8	90
9	(Japan) "Ken Alex"	9	7	Ret	10	4	10	2	3	C	2	7	3	11	11	**14**	86.5
10	(Japan) "Ikari"	3	5	7	9	8	5	9	12	C	13	13	12	3	5	11	74
11	(Japan) Masayoshi Oyama	5	Ret	12	13	12	9	8	8	C	10	14	6	8	9	9	36
12	(Japan) Yuichi Sasaki	WD	WD	11	11	13	14	10	13	C	7	6	15	7	4	12	33
13	(Japan) Hachiro Osaka	10	4	14	12	14	13	12	10	C	11	11	10	6	6	13	31.5
14	(Japan) Motohiro Kotani	8	3	Ret	15	10	11	13	14	C	Ret	10	11	14	7	17	27
15	(Japan) Keiji Nakao	2	10	Ret	8	11	DNS										23
16	(Japan) "Yugo”	11	8	10	17	15	15	Ret	15	C	14	12	13	12	12	15	5
17	(Japan) Tadakazu Kojima														8	10	5
18	(United States) William Sakai	Ret	9	9	14	16	12								10	16	5
—	(Japan) Anri Sugihara											WD	WD	WD			—
Pos	Driver	R1	R2	R3	R4	R5	R6	R9	R10	R11	R12	R11	R13	R14	R7	R8	Pts
Pos	Driver	FUJ1		SUZ1		FUJ2		SUG		AUT		MOT			SUZ2		Pts

=== Teams' standings ===
Only the best finisher scored points for their team.

==== Champion Class ====
Pos	Team	FUJ1		SUZ1		FUJ2		SUG		AUT		MOT			SUZ2		Pts
Pos	Team	R1	R2	R3	R4	R5	R6	R9	R10	R11	R12	R11	R13	R14	R7	R8	Pts
1	HFDP with B-Max Racing Team	2	DNS	1	1	1	2	7	4	C	1	1	1	1	1	2	260
2	TGR-DC Racing School	1	DNS	8	6	5	5	1	1	C	2	3	5	3	2	4	170
3	HYDRANGEA Kageyama Racing	Ret	4	3	4	7	4	9	8	C	3	7	2	2	4	1	153
4	Drago Corse	4	2	5	5	4	1	11	13	C	10	8	10	5	7	9	115
5	HELM Motorsports	15	1	4	2	2	11	10	9	C	Ret	15	Ret	11	5	3	99
6	PONOS Racing	12	DNS	6	8	11	3	2	2	C	7	4	4	6	6	6	99
7	Bionic Jack Racing	6	Ret	13	21	8	12	14	18	C	12	5	15	10	8	Ret	27
8	OTG Motor Sports	10	5	18	12	12	9	15	19	C	15	12	Ret	12	12	8	17
9	Falcon Motorsport	8	7	16	18	DNS	DNS					Ret	12	15	19	Ret	10
10	Rn-sports	Ret	6														8
11	Skill Speed	9	8	20	14	14	15	16	16						WD	WD	6
12	Dr. Dry	Ret	11	15	19	13	Ret	12	11	C	13	11	9	13	10	11	3
13	Akiland Racing	Ret	10	21	20	19	Ret	19	17	C	14	18	14	16	18	14	1
15	TGM Grand Prix														15	10	1
14	Zap Speed	13	Ret	19	16	15	17	17	14	C	17	14	11	14	Ret	12	0
Pos	Team	R1	R2	R3	R4	R5	R6	R9	R10	R11	R12	R11	R13	R14	R7	R8	Pts
Pos	Team	FUJ1		SUZ1		FUJ2		SUG		AUT		MOT			SUZ2		Pts

==== Independent Class ====
Pos	Team	FUJ1		SUZ1		FUJ2		SUG		AUT		MOT			SUZ2		Pts
Pos	Team	R1	R2	R3	R4	R5	R6	R9	R10	R11	R12	R11	R13	R14	R7	R8	Pts
1	B-Max Racing Team	1	DNS	1	1	5	3	1	1	C	1	1	1	1	2	2	273.5
2	Akiland Racing	2	2	4	5	11	2	8	6	C	6	4	5	4	9	6	134
3	Rn-sports	WD	WD	5	3	3	8	4	4	C	5	3	4	2	Ret	4	135
4	Field Motorsports	4	1	3	7	2	1	Ret	9	C	9	Ret	8	9	Ret	7	114
5	HELM Motorsports	Ret	9	9	6	1	12	7	11	C	12	9	2	13	1	1	113
6	Eagle Sports	6	6	8	16	6	7	5	7	C	8	5	14	5	3	8	90
7	Buzz Racing	9	7	Ret	10	4	10	2	3	C	2	7	3	11	11	14	86.5
8	Bionic Jack Racing	3	5	7	9	8	5	9	12	C	13	13	12	3	5	11	74
9	DayDream Racing	WD	WD	11	11	13	14	10	14	C	7	6	15	7	4	12	33
10	Dr. Dry	10	4	14	12	14	13	12	10	C	11	11	10	6	6	13	31.5
11	Team 5ZIGEN	8	3	Ret	15	10	11	13	14	C	Ret	10	11	14	7	17	27
12	N-SPEED	11	8	10	17	15	15	Ret	15	C	14	12	13	12	12	15	5
—	Zap Speed											WD	WD	WD			—
Pos	Team	R1	R2	R3	R4	R5	R6	R9	R10	R11	R12	R11	R13	R14	R7	R8	Pts
Pos	Team	FUJ1		SUZ1		FUJ2		SUG		AUT		MOT			SUZ2		Pts
