= 2021 F4 Japanese Championship =

Motor racing competition

The 2021 F4 Japanese Championship season was the seventh season of the F4 Japanese Championship. It held a total of 14 races over four double-header rounds and two triple-header rounds.

== Teams and drivers ==
All teams were Japanese-registered.

Team	No.	Driver	Class	Rounds
TCS Racing Team	2	(Japan) Keiji Nakao	I	2–4
Field Motorsports	3	(Japan) Sergeyevich Sato	I	2–6
DayDream Racing	4	(Japan) Yuichi Sasaki	I	1, 3
Honda Formula Dream Project	5	(Japan) Syun Koide		All
Honda Formula Dream Project	6	(Japan) Iori Kimura		All
Honda Formula Dream Project	7	(Japan) Kakunoshin Ohta		All
Rn-sports	11	(Japan) "Hirobon"	I	All
Rn-sports	99	(Japan) Yoshitsugu Kondo	I	All
KRac Motorsports	13	(Japan) Daiki Fujiwara		All
Zap Speed	14	(Japan) Motohiko Isozaki	I	3
Zap Speed	14	(Japan) Hikaru Abe		5
Zap Speed	43	(Japan) "Dragon"	I	All
Zap Speed	86	(Japan) Hachiro Osaka	I	All
Media Do Kageyama Racing	15	(Japan) Wataru Yoshimura		1, 3–6
Media Do Kageyama Racing	16	(Japan) Haruyuki Takahashi		1, 3
Media Do Kageyama Racing	16	(Japan) Takuya Otaki		2, 4–6
Akiland Racing	18	(Japan) Makoto Hotta	I	1–2, 6
Akiland Racing	18	(Japan) Hiromitsu Fujii	I	3
Akiland Racing	22	(Japan) Reijiro Yamazaki		6
Akiland Racing	71	(Japan) Masayoshi Oyama	I	All
Akiland Racing	96	(Japan) Makio Saito	I	All
RSS	20	(Japan) Kotaro Shimbara		3–6
N-SPEED	23	(Japan) "Yugo"	I	1–2, 4–6
Tsuyoshi Usui	24	(Japan) Tsuyoshi Usui	I	2
B-Max Engineering	27	(Japan) "Syuji"	I	5–6
B-Max Engineering	44	(Japan) "Syuji"	I	4
B-Max Engineering	44	(Japan) Nobuhiro Imada	I	2–3, 5
Saccess Racing	29	(Japan) Yasushi Ide	I	1
Saccess Racing	39	(Japan) Gento Miyashita		1, 3–6
Saccess Racing	40	(Japan) Seiya Motojima		All
ATEAM Buzz Motorsport	31	(Japan) Teppei Tsuruta		All
ATEAM Buzz Motorsport	32	(Finland) Max Salo		All
ATEAM Buzz Motorsport	33	(Japan) Katsunori Keihara	I	1–2, 4–6
TGR-DC Racing School	35	(Japan) Seita Nonaka		All
TGR-DC Racing School	36	(Japan) Rin Arakawa		All
TGR-DC Racing School	37	(Japan) Jiei Okuzumi		All
TGR-DC Racing School	38	(Japan) Eijiro Shimizu		All
HELM Motorsports	62	(Japan) Ryosuke Matsuzawa		All
HELM Motorsports	63	(Japan) Yutaka Toriba	I	2–6
leprix sport	70	(Japan) Isao Nakashima	I	5
C.S.I-Reon Kids Racing	73	(Japan) Shunsuke Hanawa		All
Skill Speed	77	(Japan) Sota Ogawa		All
OTG Motor Sports	80	(Japan) Reimei Ito		All
Bionic Jack Racing	97	(Japan) Yugo Iwasawa		All
Bionic Jack Racing	98	(Japan) Daiki Okamoto		1–4
Bionic Jack Racing	98	(Japan) "Ikari"	I	6

Icon	Class
I	Independent Cup

== Race calendar and results ==
All rounds were held in Japan and support the Super GT events. The revised calendar was published on 10 February 2021. The second round of the championship at Suzuka Circuit was postponed from 29–30 May to 21–22 August due to COVID-19 pandemic. The nomenclature was kept, despite the round at Twin Ring Motegi being held in the meantime.

Round		Circuit	Date	Pole position	Fastest lap	Winning driver	Winning team	Independent Cup winner
1	R1	Fuji Speedway, Oyama	3 May	(Japan) Iori Kimura	(Japan) Rin Arakawa	(Japan) Iori Kimura	Honda Formula Dream Project	(Japan) "Dragon"
1	R2	Fuji Speedway, Oyama	4 May	(Japan) Syun Koide	(Japan) Syun Koide	(Japan) Seita Nonaka	TGR-DC Racing School	(Japan) "Hirobon"
3 (Note: The round was postponed from 29–30 May to 21–22 August but it is still considered as Round 2 with Race 3&4.)	R6	Suzuka Circuit, Suzuka	21 August	(Japan) Iori Kimura	(Japan) Eijiro Shimizu	(Japan) Iori Kimura	Honda Formula Dream Project	(Japan) "Hirobon"
3	R7	Suzuka Circuit, Suzuka	22 August	(Japan) Iori Kimura	(Japan) Jiei Okuzumi	(Japan) Rin Arakawa (Note: Iori Kimura crossed the line as the first but was given a 5 second penalty for a dangerous driving behavior. Arakawa inherited the win.)	TGR-DC Racing School	(Japan) Sergeyevich Sato
2	R3	Twin Ring Motegi, Motegi	17 July	(Japan) Reimei Ito	(Japan) Seita Nonaka	(Japan) Seita Nonaka	TGR-DC Racing School	(Japan) Yutaka Toriba
2	R4	Twin Ring Motegi, Motegi	17 July	(Japan) Seita Nonaka	(Japan) Seita Nonaka	(Japan) Seita Nonaka	TGR-DC Racing School	(Japan) Yutaka Toriba
2	R5	Twin Ring Motegi, Motegi	18 July		(Japan) Seita Nonaka	(Japan) Seita Nonaka	TGR-DC Racing School	(Japan) "Hirobon"
4	R8	Sportsland Sugo, Murata	11 September	(Japan) Syun Koide	(Japan) Iori Kimura	(Japan) Syun Koide	Honda Formula Dream Project	(Japan) Yutaka Toriba
4	R9	Sportsland Sugo, Murata	11 September	(Japan) Iori Kimura	(Japan) Kotaro Shimbara	(Japan) Iori Kimura	Honda Formula Dream Project	(Japan) Yutaka Toriba
4	R10	Sportsland Sugo, Murata	12 September		(Japan) Seita Nonaka	(Japan) Reimei Ito	OTG Motor Sports	(Japan) "Dragon"
5	R11	Twin Ring Motegi, Motegi	6 November	(Japan) Rin Arakawa	(Japan) Rin Arakawa	(Japan) Iori Kimura	Honda Formula Dream Project	(Japan) Yutaka Toriba
5	R12	Twin Ring Motegi, Motegi	7 November	(Japan) Rin Arakawa	(Japan) Rin Arakawa	(Japan) Rin Arakawa	TGR-DC Racing School	(Japan) Yutaka Toriba
6	R13	Fuji Speedway, Oyama	27 November	(Japan) Reimei Ito	(Japan) Seita Nonaka	(Japan) Seita Nonaka	TGR-DC Racing School	(Japan) Yutaka Toriba
6	R14	Fuji Speedway, Oyama	28 November	(Japan) Reimei Ito	(Japan) Kakunoshin Ohta	(Japan) Seita Nonaka	TGR-DC Racing School	(Japan) "Hirobon"

== Championship standings ==
Points were awarded as follows:

Position	**1st**	**2nd**	**3rd**	**4th**	**5th**	**6th**	**7th**	**8th**	**9th**	**10th**
Points	25	18	15	12	10	8	6	4	2	1

=== Drivers' standings ===
Pos	Driver	FUJ1		SUZ		MOT1			SUG			MOT2		FUJ2		Pts
Pos	Driver	R1	R2	R3	R4	R5	R6	R7	R8	R9	R10	R11	R12	R13	R14	Pts
1	(Japan) Seita Nonaka	3	1	28	7	1	**1**	1	5	7	2	4	Ret	1	1	217
2	(Japan) Rin Arakawa	6	2	5	1	4	3	3	4	5	4	**2**	**1**	3	2	213
3	(Japan) Iori Kimura	**1**	25	**1**	**5**	5	2	7	2	**1**	26	1	9	4	3	191
4	(Japan) Reimei Ito	8	6	7	4	**2**	4	6	3	2	1	9	7	**2**	**6**	160
5	(Japan) Kakunoshin Ohta	4	31	2	2	3	5	2	8	9	6	3	2	Ret	4	150
6	(Japan) Syun Koide	2	**7**	3	Ret	7	6	Ret	**1**	3	3	Ret	8	6	8	124
7	(Japan) Jiei Okuzumi	7	5	6	6	8	9	5	9	8	12	5	3	5	5	99
8	(Japan) Eijiro Shimizu	5	3	4	19	6	10	4	10	10	10	Ret	10	7	26	68
9	(Japan) Seiya Motojima	10	8	22	3	12	13	10	7	6	5	7	6	12	15	59
10	(Japan) Sota Ogawa	9	4	9	12	9	8	8	12	13	11	6	4	13	7	52
11	(Japan) Ryosuke Matsuzawa	12	9	11	8	11	11	12	6	4	8	27†	12	8	11	34
12	(Japan) Yugo Iwasawa	11	12	8	9	10	7	9	Ret	12	7	Ret	5	9	10	34
13	(Japan) Takuya Otaki			14	10				11	30†	9	8	13	Ret	21	7
14	(Japan) Kotaro Shimbara					13	Ret	11	DNS	11	24	10	14	DSQ	9	3
15	(Japan) Daiki Fujiwara	17	10	12	11	14	12	13	13	17	13	12	17	11	12	1
16	(Japan) Gento Miyashita	16	15			16	17	14	14	16	15	11	11	10	13	1
17	(Japan) "Hirobon"	21	16	10	15	20	19	20	21	20	20	22	23	30	16	1
18	(Japan) Teppei Tsuruta	15	11	30	DSQ	18	24	18	15	15	14	16	18	17	14	0
19	(Japan) Daiki Okamoto	14	13	13	13	15	16	16	17	14	16					0
20	(Japan) Shunsuke Hanawa	19	14			31	14	17	16	25	17	13	22	18	20	0
21	(Japan) Haruyuki Takahashi	13	19			17	Ret	15								0
22	(Japan) Yutaka Toriba			Ret	18	19	15	21	19	18	19	14	16	14	29	0
23	(Japan) Sergeyevich Sato			20	14	23	20	25	23	24	25	15	19	Ret	18	0
24	(Japan) Wataru Yoshimura	22	18			21	21	22	18	19	Ret	Ret	15	15	Ret	0
25	(Japan) Makio Saito	Ret	21	15	25	22	23	24	Ret	22	22	20	21	20	19	0
26	(Japan) "Dragon"	20	17	18	17	Ret	Ret	DNS	20	21	18	17	20	16	Ret	0
27	(Finland) Max Salo	18	20	16	21	27	18	19	24	Ret	21	18	24	19	28	0
28	(Japan) Nobuhiro Imada			23	16	Ret	28	26				19	26			0
29	(Japan) "Ikari"													21	17	0
30	(Japan) Tsuyoshi Usui			17	Ret											0
31	(Japan) Masayoshi Oyama	27	27	19	24	28	29	31	27	31†	29	24	28	26	Ret	0
32	(Japan) Keiji Nakao			21	20	Ret	22	23	22	23	23					0
33	(Japan) Hikaru Abe											21	25			0
34	(Japan) Hachiro Osaka	25	30†	29	22	29	27	29	26	32†	27	Ret	29	22	Ret	0
35	(Japan) Makoto Hotta	26	24	26	23									25	22	0
36	(Japan) Yuichi Sasaki	Ret	22			25	25	28								0
37	(Japan) Yoshitsugu Kondo	23	26	27	Ret	24	26	27	25	29	28	23	27	24	23	0
38	(Japan) Yasushi Ide	24	23													0
39	(Japan) Reijiro Yamazaki													23	24	0
40	(Japan) "Yugo"	28	28	24	Ret				29	28	31	26	31	29	27	0
41	(Japan) Katsunori Keihara	29	29	25	Ret				30	27	Ret	25	30	28	30	0
42	(Japan) "Syuji"								28	26	30	Ret	Ret	27	25	0
43	(Japan) Motohiko Isozaki					26	31	30								0
44	(Japan) Hiromitsu Fujii					30	30	32								0
–	(Japan) Isao Nakashima											Ret	Ret			–
Pos	Driver	R1	R2	R3	R4	R5	R6	R7	R8	R9	R10	R11	R12	R13	R14	Pts
Pos	Driver	FUJ1		SUZ		MOT1			SUG			MOT2		FUJ2		Pts

Colour	Result
Gold	Winner
Silver	Second place
Bronze	Third place
Green	Points classification
Blue	Non-points classification
Blue	Non-classified finish (NC)
Purple	Retired, not classified (Ret)
Red	Did not qualify (DNQ)
Red	Did not pre-qualify (DNPQ)
Black	Disqualified (DSQ)
White	Did not start (DNS)
White	Withdrew (WD)
White	Race cancelled (C)
Blank	Did not practice (DNP)
Blank	Did not arrive (DNA)
Blank	Excluded (EX)

**Bold** – Pole
Italics – Fastest Lap
† — Did not finish but classified

=== Independent Cup ===
Pos	Driver	FUJ1		SUZ		MOT1			SUG			MOT2		FUJ2		Pts
Pos	Driver	R1	R2	R3	R4	R5	R6	R7	R8	R9	R10	R11	R12	R13	R14	Pts
1	(Japan) "Hirobon"	21	16	10	15	20	19	20	21	20	20	22	23	30	16	238
2	(Japan) Yutaka Toriba			Ret	18	19	15	21	19	18	19	14	16	14	29	223
3	(Japan) "Dragon"	20	17	18	17	Ret	Ret	DNS	20	21	18	17	20	16	Ret	173
4	(Japan) Sergeyevich Sato			20	14	23	20	25	23	24	25	15	19	Ret	18	147
5	(Japan) Makio Saito	Ret	21	15	25	22	23	24	Ret	22	22	20	21	20	19	144
6	(Japan) Yoshitsugu Kondo	23	26	27	Ret	24	26	27	25	29	28	23	27	24	23	84
7	(Japan) Keiji Nakao			21	20	Ret	22	23	22	23	23					73
8	(Japan) Nobuhiro Imada			23	16	Ret	28	26				19	26			49
9	(Japan) Hachiro Osaka	25	30†	29	22	29	27	29	26	32†	27	Ret	29	22	Ret	48
10	(Japan) Masayoshi Oyama	27	27	19	24	28	29	31	27	31†	29	24	28	26	Ret	45
11	(Japan) Makoto Hotta	26	24	26	23									25	22	36
12	(Japan) Yuichi Sasaki	Ret	22			25	25	28								32
13	(Japan) "Ikari"													21	17	30
14	(Japan) Yasushi Ide	24	23													22
15	(Japan) "Syuji"								28	26	30	Ret	Ret	27	25	17
16	(Japan) "Yugo"	28	28	24	Ret				29	28	31	26	31	29	27	16
17	(Japan) Tsuyoshi Usui			17	Ret											15
18	(Japan) Katsunori Keihara	29	29	25	Ret				30	27	Ret	25	30	28	30	13
19	(Japan) Motohiko Isozaki					26	31	30								7
20	(Japan) Hiromitsu Fujii					30	30	32								1
–	(Japan) Isao Nakashima											Ret	Ret			–
Pos	Driver	R1	R2	R3	R4	R5	R6	R7	R8	R9	R10	R11	R12	R13	R14	Pts
Pos	Driver	FUJ1		SUZ		MOT1			SUG			MOT2		FUJ2		Pts

=== Teams' standings ===
Only the best finisher scored points for their team.

Pos	Team	Points
1	TGR-DC Racing School	285
2	Honda Formula Dream Project	260
3	OTG Motor Sports	160
4	Saccess Racing	59
5	Skill Speed	52
6	HELM Motorsports	34
7	Bionic Jack Racing	34
8	Media Do Kageyama Racing	7
9	RSS	3
10	KRac Motorsports	1
11	Rn-sports	1
