= Rintaro Sato =

Japanese racing driver

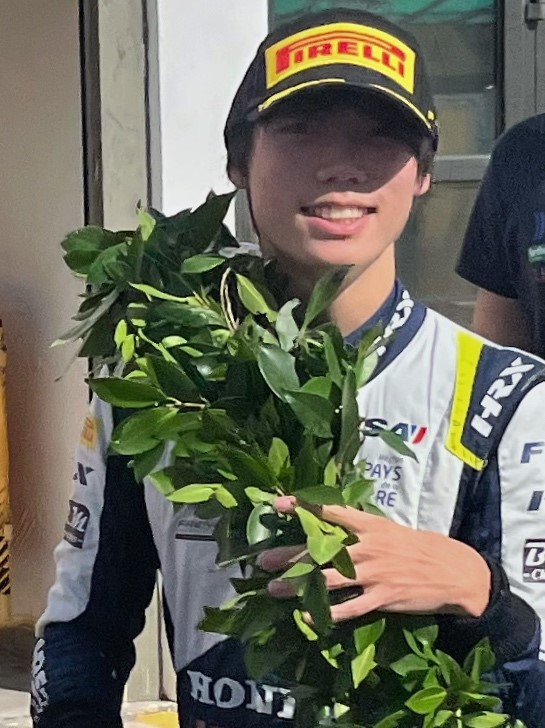
- Sato at the 2025 FIA F4 World Cup
- Nationality: (Japan) Japanese
- Born: 23 December 2005 (age 20) Tokyo, Japan
- Relatives: Takuma Sato (father)

Super Formula Lights career
- Debut season: 2026
- Current team: FFSA Academy
- Car number: 26
- Starts: 15
- Wins: 0
- Podiums: 0
- Poles: 0
- Fastest laps: 0
- Best finish: 9th in 2026

Previous series
- 2025 2024: French F4; F4 Japanese
- Statistics up to date as of 20 September 2026.

Rintaro Sato (佐藤 凛太郎, Satō Rintarō; born 23 December 2005) is a Japanese racing driver who last competed in the Super Formula Lights for B-Max Engineering as part of the Honda Formula Dream Project.

He is the son of Japanese and former Formula One racing driver Takuma Sato.

== Career ==
=== Formula 4 ===
==== 2024 ====
Sato made his single-seater debut in the 2024 F4 Japanese Championship with Ponos Racing alongside Kento Omiya. He finished eighth in the standings with one podium, which he secured in the fourth round of the championship, in Race 1 at Sportsland Sugo.

==== 2025 ====
Sato competed in the French F4 Championship after he received a scholarship from Honda's Suzuka Racing School, alongside Kotaro Shimbara. He finished ninth in the standings, scoring his maiden F4 win during Race 3, Round 5 at Lédenon.

=== Formula Regional ===
Sato made his Formula regional debut race in 2024 Macau Grand Prix with TGM Grand Prix alongside 2023 Formula Regional Japan champion Sota Ogawa.

== Racing record ==
=== Career summary ===
| Season | Series | Team | Races | Wins | Poles | FLaps | Podiums | Points | Position |
|---|---|---|---|---|---|---|---|---|---|
| 2024 | F4 Japanese Championship | PONOS Racing | 13 | 0 | 0 | 0 | 1 | 70 | 8th |
| 2024 | Macau Grand Prix | TGM Grand Prix | 1 | 0 | 0 | 0 | 0 | N/A | DNF |
| 2025 | French F4 Championship | FFSA Academy | 18 | 1 | 0 | 0 | 3 | 91 | 8th |
| 2025 | FIA F4 World Cup | | 1 | 0 | 0 | 0 | 1 | —N/a | **3rd** |
| 2026 | Super Formula Lights | B-Max Engineering | 15 | 0 | 0 | 0 | 0 | 17 | 9th |
| 2026 | Super Taikyu - ST-TCR | Hitonowa The Team Standard | 3 | 1 | 0 | 1 | 2 | 48 | **3rd*** |

* Season still in progress.

=== Complete F4 Japanese Championship results ===
(key) (Races in bold indicate pole position) (Races in italics indicate fastest lap)

| Year | Team | 1 | 2 | 3 | 4 | 5 | 6 | 7 | 8 | 9 | 10 | 11 | 12 | 13 | 14 | DC | Pts |
|---|---|---|---|---|---|---|---|---|---|---|---|---|---|---|---|---|---|
| 2024 | PONOS Racing | FUJ1; 1; 14 | FUJ1; 2 DNS | SUZ; 1; 6 | SUZ; 2; 9 | FUJ2; 1; 18 | FUJ2; 2; 6 | SUG; 1; 3 | SUG; 2; 6 | AUT; 2; 7 | MOT; 1; 17 | MOT; 2; 8 | MOT; 3; 6 | SUZ2; 1; 6 | SUZ2; 2; 6 | 8th | 70 |

=== Complete Macau Grand Prix results ===
| Year | Team | Car | Qualifying | Quali Race | Main race |
|---|---|---|---|---|---|
| 2024 | (Japan) TGM Grand Prix | Tatuus F3 T-318 | 25th | 16th | DNF |

=== Complete French F4 Championship results ===
(key) (Races in bold indicate pole position) (Races in italics indicate fastest lap)

| Year | 1 | 2 | 3 | 4 | 5 | 6 | 7 | 8 | 9 | 10 | 11 | 12 | 13 | 14 | 15 | 16 | 17 | 18 | DC | Points |
|---|---|---|---|---|---|---|---|---|---|---|---|---|---|---|---|---|---|---|---|---|
| 2025 | NOG; 1; 25† | NOG; 2 Ret | NOG; 3; 24 | DIJ; 1; 10 | DIJ; 2; 5 | DIJ; 3; 6 | SPA; 1; 8 | SPA; 2 Ret | SPA; 3 Ret | MAG; 1; 8 | MAG; 2; 6 | MAG; 3; 10 | LÉD; 1 Ret | LÉD; 2; 3 | LÉD; 3; 1 | LMS; 1; 2 | LMS; 2 Ret | LMS; 3; 22 | 9th | 81 |

=== Complete FIA F4 World Cup results ===
| Year | Car | Qualifying | Quali Race | Main Race |
|---|---|---|---|---|
| 2025 | Mygale M21-F4 | 8th | 11th | **3rd** |

=== Complete Super Formula Lights results ===
(key) (Races in bold indicate pole position) (Races in italics indicate fastest lap)

| Year | Entrant | 1 | 2 | 3 | 4 | 5 | 6 | 7 | 8 | 9 | 10 | 11 | 12 | 13 | 14 | 15 | 16 | 17 | 18 | Pos | Points |
|---|---|---|---|---|---|---|---|---|---|---|---|---|---|---|---|---|---|---|---|---|---|
| 2026 | B-Max Engineering | FUJ; 1; 6 | FUJ; 2; 10 | FUJ; 3; 8 | AUT; 1; 4 | AUT; 2; 4 | AUT; 3 Ret | SUZ; 1; 5 | SUZ; 2; 4 | SUZ; 3; 5 | OKA; 1 | OKA; 2 | OKA; 3 | SUG; 1; 7 | SUG; 2; 4 | SUG; 3; 7 | MOT; 1; 7 | MOT; 2 Ret | MOT; 3; 8 | 9th | 17 |
