= Reimei Ito =

Japanese racing driver

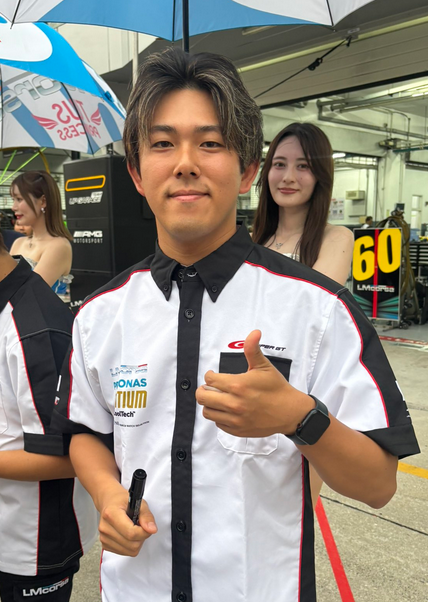
- Ito at the 2025 Super GT Malaysia Festival
- Nationality: (Japan) Japanese
- Born: 30 June 2000 (age 26) Hyogo, Japan

Super GT - GT300 career
- Debut season: 2023
- Current team: LM corsa
- Categorisation: FIA Silver
- Car number: 60
- Former teams: Yogibo Racing
- Starts: 10
- Wins: 0
- Podiums: 0
- Poles: 0
- Fastest laps: 0
- Best finish: 20th in 2023

Super Formula Lights career
- Debut season: 2024
- Current team: LM corsa
- Car number: 60
- Starts: 24
- Wins: 0
- Podiums: 0
- Poles: 0
- Fastest laps: 0
- Best finish: 9th in 2024

Previous series
- 2024-25 2020-2022: Porsche Carrera Cup Japan; F4 Japanese Championship

Championship titles
- 2024: Porsche Carrera Cup Japan

Reimei Ito (伊東 黎明, Itou Reimei; born 30 July 2000) is a Japanese racing driver currently competing in Super GT as a third driver, and also in Super Formula Lights with LM corsa. He was the 2024 Porsche Carrera Cup Japan champion.

== Career ==
=== Formula 4 ===
Ito started his F4 career in 2020 with OTG Motor Sports competing until 2022.

=== Super Formula Lights ===
Ito would compete with the Super GT team LM corsa at the rounds at Okayama and Motegi, with both driver and team making their series debut. Ito finished 9th in the standings with a point. Ito then continue to race full time for 2025.

=== Super GT ===
In 2023, Ito competed in Super GT, with new team Yogibo Racing alongside F4 driver Yugo Iwasawa. Ito did not continue to race as Yogibo Racing withdrew its entry for the 2024 season, citing a change in corporate strategy from the Yogibo brand. Ito returned to the series as the third driver with LM corsa for the last round at Suzuka alongside Hiroki Yoshimoto & Shunsuke Kohno. Ito stayed with the team as third driver role.

== Racing record ==
=== Racing career summary ===
Season	Series	Team	Races	Wins	Poles	FLaps	Podiums	Points	Position
2020	F4 Japanese Championship	OTG Motor Sports	12	0	0	0	1	89	5th
2021	F4 Japanese Championship	OTG Motor Sports	14	0	3	0	6	160	4th
2022	F4 Japanese Championship	OTG Motor Sports	14	0	0	0	2	68	7th
2022	Super Taikyu - ST-2	Endless Sports	6	1	0	0	5	140‡	**2nd‡**
2023	Super GT - GT300	Yogibo Racing	8	0	0	0	0	10	20th
2023	Super Taikyu - ST-2	Endless Sports	6	2	0	0	5	130.5‡	**2nd‡**
2024	Porsche Carrera Cup Japan	Showa Auto with Bingo Racing	11	10	11	7	11	257.5	**1st**
2024	Super Formula Lights	LM corsa	6	0	0	0	0	1	9th
2024	Super GT – GT300	LM corsa	1	0	0	0	0	0	NC
2024	Super Taikyu – ST-2	Endless Sports	5	1	0	0	3	120.5‡	**2nd‡**
2024	Super Taikyu – ST-4	Endless Sports	1	1	0	1	1	134‡	**1st‡**
2024	TGR GR86/BRZ Cup	OTG Motor Sports	7	0	0	0	1	29	10th
2025	Porsche Carrera Cup Japan	Showa Auto with Bingo Racing	11	2	2	1	9	204	**2nd**
2025	Super Formula Lights	LM corsa	18	0	0	0	0	1	11th
2025	Super GT – GT300	LM corsa	2	0	0	0	0	1	32nd
2025	Super Taikyu – ST-2	Endless Sports							
2026	Porsche Carrera Cup Japan	Showa Auto with Bingo Racing	11	1	3	2	6	165	**3rd**
2026	Super GT – GT300	CarGuy MKS Racing	3	0	0	0	0	17	30th
2026	Super Taikyu - ST-2	Endless Sports							

^{*} Season still in progress.
‡ Team standings

=== Complete F4 Japanese Championship results ===
(key) (Races in bold indicate pole position) (Races in italics indicate fastest lap)

Year	Team	1	2	3	4	5	6	7	8	9	10	11	12	13	14	DC	Pts
2020	OTG Motor Sports	FUJ1; 1; 5	FUJ1; 2; 7	FUJ1; 3; 6	SUZ; 1; 6	SUZ; 2; 6	SUZ; 3; 5	MOT; 1; 9	MOT; 2; 7	MOT; 3; 6	FUJ2; 1; 25	FUJ2; 2; 4	FUJ2; 3; 3			5th	89
2021	OTG Motor Sports	FUJ1; 1; 8	FUJ1; 2; 6	SUZ; 1; 7	SUZ; 2; 4	**MOT1**; **1**; 2	MOT1; 2; 4	MOT1; 3; 6	SUG; 1; 3	SUG; 2; 2	SUG; 3; 1	MOT2; 1; 9	MOT2; 2; 7	**FUJ2**; **1**; 2	**FUJ2**; **2**; 6	4th	160
2022	OTG Motor Sports	FUJ1; 1; 3	FUJ1; 2; 3	SUZ; 1; 10	SUZ; 2; 6	FUJ2; 1; 5	FUJ2; 2; 7	SUZ2; 1; 11	SUZ2; 2; 9	SUG; 1; 10	SUG; 2; 10	AUT; 1; 10	AUT; 2; 7	MOT; 1; 9	MOT; 2 Ret	7th	68

=== Complete Super GT results ===
Year	Team	Car	Class	1	2	3	4	5	6	7	8	9	DC	Points
2023	Yogibo Racing	Honda NSX GT3	GT300	OKA; 4	FUJ; 23†	SUZ; 7	FUJ; 10	SUZ; 9	SUG; 18	AUT; Ret	MOT; Ret		20th	10
2024	LM corsa	Toyota GR Supra GT300	GT300	OKA	FUJ	SUZ	FUJ	SUZ	SUG	AUT	MOT; 14		NC	0
2025	LM corsa	Lexus LC 500 GT	GT300	OKA	FUJ; 10	SEP	FS1	FS2	SUZ	SUG	AUT; 20	MOT	32nd	1
2026	CarGuy MKS Racing	Ferrari 296 GT3 Evo	GT300	OKA; 13	FUJ; 11	FUJ	SUZ	SUG	AUT; 7	MOT	MOT		30th	17

=== Complete Super Formula Lights results ===
(key) (Races in bold indicate pole position) (Races in italics indicate fastest lap)

Year	Entrant	1	2	3	4	5	6	7	8	9	10	11	12	13	14	15	16	17	18	Pos	Points
2024	LM corsa	AUT; 1	AUT; 2	AUT; 3	SUG; 1	SUG; 2	SUG; 3	FUJ; 1	FUJ; 2	FUJ; 3	OKA; 1; 8	OKA; 2; 6	OKA; 3; 7	SUZ; 1	SUZ; 2	SUZ; 3	MOT; 1; 8	MOT; 2; 10	MOT; 3; 9	9th	1
2025	LM corsa	SUZ; 1; 11	SUZ; 2; 6	SUZ; 3; 9	AUT; 1; 11	AUT; 2; 9	OKA; 1; 9	OKA; 2; 10	OKA; 3 Ret	SUG; 1; 10	SUG; 2; 8	SUG; 3; 8	SUG; 4; 9	FUJ; 1; 8	FUJ; 2; 8	FUJ; 3; 8	MOT; 1; 10	MOT; 2; 7	MOT; 3; 9	10th	1

^{*} Season still in progress.
