= Syun Koide =

Japanese racing driver (born 1999)

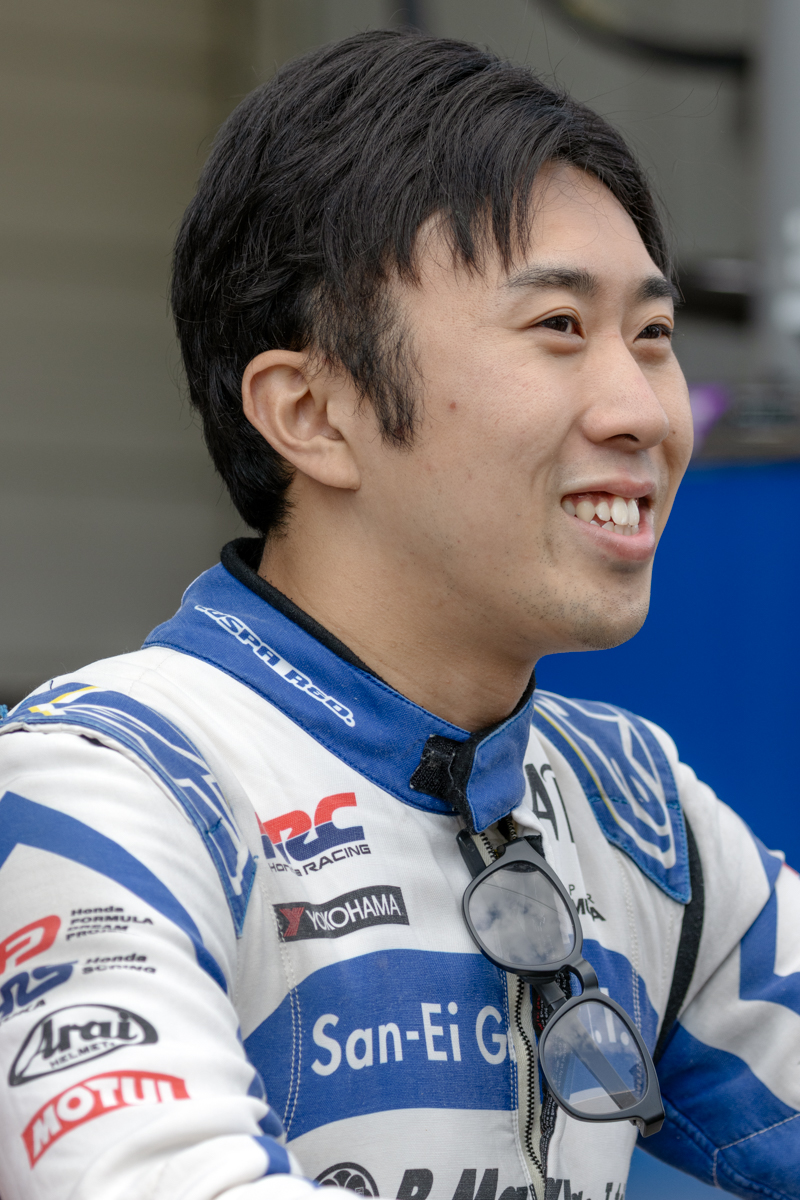
- Koide in 2025
- Nationality: (Japan) Japanese
- Born: 26 October 1999 (age 27) Higashiōsaka, Osaka, Japan

Super GT - GT500 career
- Debut season: 2025
- Current team: Real Racing
- Car number: 17
- Starts: 8
- Wins: 0
- Podiums: 1
- Poles: 0
- Best finish: 11th in 2025

Super Formula career
- Debut season: 2025
- Current team: B-Max Racing Team
- Car number: 50
- Starts: 12
- Wins: 0
- Podiums: 0
- Poles: 0
- Fastest laps: 0
- Best finish: 16th in 2025

Previous series
- 2023-24 2023-24 2020-22: Super GT - GT300; Super Formula Lights; F4 Japanese Championship

Championship titles
- 2024 2022: Super Formula Lights; F4 Japanese Championship

Syun Koide (小出 峻, Koide Shun; born 26 October 1999) is a Japanese racing driver who currently competes in Super Formula for ThreeBond Racing. Koide was the F4 Japanese Championship champion in 2022 and champion of Super Formula Lights in 2024, both achieved as part of the Honda Formula Dream Project.

== Career ==
=== Japanese Formula 4 ===
In 2020 Koide made his debut in single-seater racing in the F4 Japanese Championship. He was originally scheduled to compete for the Honda Formula Dream Project team, but Honda withdrew its entry due to the COVID-19 pandemic in Japan. He ended up competing with Vegaplus from the second round onwards along with Kakunoshin Ohta. He finished the season in tenth.

In 2021, Koide continued to race in the F4 Japanese Championship with the Honda Formula Dream Project team. He took one race win and finished the season in sixth.

In 2022, Koide missed out on move to Super Formula Lights, and stayed with the team. Koide ended up winning the F4 Japanese Championship title ahead of his teammate Yusuke Mitsui. On his way to the title, he scored a total of nine race wins.

=== Super Formula Lights ===
For 2023, Koide competed in Super Formula Lights with Toda Racing. In that season, he had over four wins, and seven podiums to date. Koide continued to compete in the series for the following year, as he moved to B-Max Racing Team. Koide won the Drivers' Championship with two races to spare, and took eight wins and three further podiums en route to his title, with his closest challengers Kobayashi and Nonaka only claiming three and five wins respectively.

=== Super GT ===
==== GT300 ====
Koide competed in the GT300-class of the 2023 Super GT Series with Team UpGarage alongside Takashi Kobayashi. Koide won his first GT300 race in the first round of the series in Okayama International Circuit. then he won as well in Suzuka. Koide continued to partner with Takashhi Kobayashi at Tean UpGarage for 2024.

==== GT500 ====
Koide then stepped up to GT500 with Real Racing as he replaces Kakunoshin Ohta who moved to IMSA SportsCar Championship's GTP class.

=== Super Formula ===
Koide stepped up to Super Formula in 2025 and race with B-Max Racing Team as he replaces Iori Kimura.

== Racing record ==
=== Career summary ===
Season	Series	Team	Races	Wins	Poles	FLaps	Podiums	Points	Position
2020	F4 Japanese Championship	Vegaplus	9	0	0	1	0	36	10th
2020	Super Taikyu - ST-TCR	Racer Dome Racing	3	1	0	1	2	77.5‡	4th‡
2021	F4 Japanese Championship	Honda Formula Dream Project	14	1	2	1	5	124	6th
2021	Super Taikyu - ST-TCR	Racer M&K Racing	3	3	1	2	3	107‡	**2nd‡**
2022	F4 Japanese Championship	Honda Formula Dream Project	14	9	9	6	12	279	**1st**
2022	Super Taikyu - ST-TCR	M&K Honda Cars Okegawa Racing	1	0	0	1	1	116‡	**2nd‡**
2023	Super GT - GT300	Team UpGarage	8	2	0	0	2	43	5th
2023	Super Formula Lights	Toda Racing	18	4	1	2	8	81	**3rd**
2023	Super Taikyu - ST-Q	Team HRC	1	0	0	0	0	N/A	NC‡
2024	Super GT - GT300	Team UpGarage	4	0	0	0	0	4	15th
2024	Super Formula Lights	B-Max Racing Team	18	8	6	7	11	114	**1st**
2024	Super Taikyu - ST-2	Team Spoon	6	1	0	0	2	73‡	6th‡
2025	Super GT - GT500	Astemo Real Racing	8	0	0	0	1	26	11th
2025	Super Formula	San-Ei Gen with B-Max	12	0	0	0	0	5	16th
2025	Super Taikyu - ST-2	Team Spoon	1	0	0	0	0	6	6th‡*
2026	Super Taikyu - ST-2	Team Spoon							

^{*} Season still in progress.
‡ Team standings

=== Complete F4 Japanese Championship results ===
(key) (Races in bold indicate pole position) (Races in italics indicate fastest lap)

Year	Team	1	2	3	4	5	6	7	8	9	10	11	12	13	14	DC	Points
2020	Vegaplus	FUJ1; 1	FUJ1; 2	FUJ1; 3	SUZ; 1; 12	SUZ; 2; 11	SUZ; 3; 6	MOT; 1 Ret	MOT; 2; 8	MOT; 3; 13	FUJ2; 1; 4	FUJ2; 2; 8	FUJ2; 3; 6			10th	36
2021	Honda Formula Dream Project	FUJ1; 1; 2	**FUJ1**; **2**; 7	SUZ; 1; 3	SUZ; 2 Ret	MOT1; 1; 7	MOT1; 2; 6	MOT1; 3 Ret	**SUG**; **1**; 1	SUG; 2; 3	SUG; 3; 3	MOT2; 1 Ret	MOT2; 2; 8	FUJ2; 1; 6	FUJ2; 2; 8	6th	124
2022	Honda Formula Dream Project	**FUJ1**; **1** Ret	**FUJ1**; **2**; 1	**SUZ1**; **1**; 1	**SUZ1**; **2**; 1	**FUJ2**; **1**; 1	FUJ2; 2; 1	SUZ2; 1; 2	SUZ2; 2; 2	**SUG**; **1**; 1	SUG; 2; 26	**AUT**; **1**; 1	**AUT**; **2**; 1	MOT; 1; 2	MOT; 2; 1	1st	279

=== Complete Super Formula Lights results ===
(key) (Races in bold indicate pole position) (Races in italics indicate fastest lap)

Year	Entrant	1	2	3	4	5	6	7	8	9	10	11	12	13	14	15	16	17	18	Pos	Points
2023	Toda Racing	AUT; 1; 5	AUT; 2; 2	AUT; 3; 5	SUG; 1; 4	SUG; 2; 3	SUG; 3; 3	SUZ; 1; 4	SUZ; 2; 5	SUZ; 3; 6	FUJ; 1; 4	FUJ; 2; 1	FUJ; 3; 7	**OKA**; **1**; 1	OKA; 2; 1	OKA; 3; 1	MOT; 1; 7	MOT; 2; 3	MOT; 3; 8	3rd	81
2024	B-Max Racing Team	AUT; 1; 5	**AUT**; **2**; 1	AUT; 3; 8	**SUG**; **1**; 1	SUG; 2; 8	SUG; 3; 2	FUJ; 1; 1	FUJ; 2; 6	FUJ; 3; 1	**OKA**; **1**; 1	**OKA**; **2**; 2	OKA; 3; 1	SUZ; 1; 6	SUZ; 2; 6	SUZ; 3; 5	**MOT**; **1**; 1	**MOT**; **2**; 2	MOT; 3; 1	1st	114

=== Complete Super GT results ===
(key) (Races in bold indicate pole position; races in italics indicate fastest lap)

Year	Team	Car	Class	1	2	3	4	5	6	7	8	9	DC	Points
2023	Team UpGarage	Honda NSX GT3 Evo	GT300	OKA; 1	FUJ; Ret	SUZ; Ret	FUJ; 17	SUZ; 1	SUG; DSQ	AUT; 17	MOT; 8		5th	43
2024	Team UpGarage	Honda NSX GT3 Evo	GT300	OKA; 16	FUJ; 7	SUZ; 13	FUJ; 16	SUG; 16	AUT; 15	MOT; 3^{3}	SUZ; 24		14th	16
2025	Astemo Real Racing	Honda Civic Type R-GT GT500	GT500	OKA; 8	FUJ; 12	SEP; 4	FS1; 9	FS2 (13)	SUZ; Ret	SUG; 3	AUT; 8	MOT; 13	11th	26

^{‡} Half points awarded as less than 75% of race distance was completed.
^{(Number)} Driver did not take part in this sprint race, points are still awarded for the teammate's result.
^{*} Season still in progress.

=== Complete Super Formula results ===
Year	Team	Engine	1	2	3	4	5	6	7	8	9	10	11	12	DC	Points
2025	San-Ei Gen with B-Max	Honda	SUZ; 14	SUZ; 8	MOT; 14	MOT; 14	AUT; 20	FUJ; 15	FUJ; 17	SUG; 13	FUJ; 22	SUZ; 13	SUZ; 13	SUZ; 9	16th	5

^{*} Season still in progress.

Sporting positions
Preceded by Seita Nonaka	F4 Japanese Championship; Champion; 2022	Succeeded by Rikuto Kobayashi
Preceded by Iori Kimura	Super Formula Lights; Champion; 2024	Succeeded by Yuto Nomura
