= 2025 Fuji 24 Hours =

Endurance race in Japan

(Japan) 2025 Fuji Super TEC 24 Hour Race
Event Information
- Round 3 of 7 in the 2025 Super Taikyu Series
- Date: 31 May–1 June 2025 Super Taikyu Series
- Location: Oyama, Suntō District, Shizuoka, Japan
- Venue: Fuji Speedway

Results
Race 1
Distance	572 laps	4,563 km (2,835 mi) km
Pole position	(Chinese Taipei) Jeffrey Lee (Japan) Kakunoshin Ohta (Canada) Dean Chen (Germany) Tom Kalender (Japan) Seiya Motojima (Hong Kong) Craft-Bamboo Racing	3:19.496
Winner	(Japan) "Daisuke" (Japan) Shunji Okumoto (Japan) Yuhki Nakayama (Japan) Tatsuya Kataoka (Japan) Yuya Motojima (Japan) TKRI	23:01:28.672

The 2025 Fuji 24 Hours (commercially titled 2025 NAPAC Fuji Super TEC 24 Hours was an endurance race for Super Taikyu Series cars, staged at Fuji Speedway, Oyama, Japan on 31 May-1 June 2025. It was the third round of the 2025 Super Taikyu Series.

The race was contested by GT and Touring Cars grouped into ten different classes of racing cars. The entry was led by the ST-X class which features the international GT racing class; GT3.

The race was won by Tatsuya Kataoka and his TKRI team in a Mercedes-AMG GT3 Evo with Daisuke Matsunaga, Yuya Motojima, Yuhki Nakayama and Shunji Okumoto co-driving. The TKRI team won by less than a minute over the Seven x Seven Porsche 911 GT3 R driven by João Paulo de Oliveira, Kiyoto Fujinami, Hiroyuki Ogawa and Taichi Watarai. The race was shortened to 23 hours after a rain storm delayed the race start. The winning Mercedes completed

== Class structure ==
Entries were divided into classes based on car type.

- ST-X (Current Specification FIA GT3 cars)
- ST-Z (Current Specification SRO GT4 cars)
- ST-TCR (Current Specification TCR cars)
- ST-Q (NLS SPX cars)
- ST-1 - Cars over 3,500 cc
- ST-2 - 2,400 cc - 3,500 cc 4WD and front-wheel drive
- ST-3 - 2,400 cc - 3,500 cc rear-wheel drive
- ST-4 - 1,500 cc - 2,500 cc
- ST-5F - Under 1,500 cc front-wheel drive
- ST-5R - Under 1,500 cc rear-wheel drive

== Results ==
=== Race ===
Class winners denoted in bold and with ‡.

Pos	Class	No.	Team / Entrant	Drivers	Car	Laps
Pos	Class	No.	Team / Entrant	Drivers	Engine	Laps
1	**ST-X**	**23**	**(Japan) TKRI**	**(Japan) Tatsuya Kataoka (Japan) Daisuke Matsunaga (Japan) Yuya Motojima (Japan) Yuhki Nakayama (Japan) Shunji Okumoto**	**Mercedes-AMG GT3 Evo**	**572 ‡**
1	**ST-X**	**23**	**(Japan) TKRI**	**(Japan) Tatsuya Kataoka (Japan) Daisuke Matsunaga (Japan) Yuya Motojima (Japan) Yuhki Nakayama (Japan) Shunji Okumoto**	**Mercedes-AMG M159 6.2 L V8**	**572 ‡**
2	ST-X	666	(Japan) Seven x Seven Racing	(Brazil) João Paulo de Oliveira (Japan) Kiyoto Fujinami (Japan) Hiroyuki Ogawa (Japan) Taichi Watarai	Porsche 911 GT3 R (992)	572
2	ST-X	666	(Japan) Seven x Seven Racing	(Brazil) João Paulo de Oliveira (Japan) Kiyoto Fujinami (Japan) Hiroyuki Ogawa (Japan) Taichi Watarai	Porsche M97/80 4.2 L Flat-6	572
3	ST-X	101	(Japan) Hitotsuyama Racing	(Japan) Anna Inotsume (Japan) Shintaro Kawabata (Japan) Sota Ogawa (United Kingdom) James Pull (Japan) Kenji Suzuki	Audi R8 LMS Evo II	561
3	ST-X	101	(Japan) Hitotsuyama Racing	(Japan) Anna Inotsume (Japan) Shintaro Kawabata (Japan) Sota Ogawa (United Kingdom) James Pull (Japan) Kenji Suzuki	Audi DAR 5.2 L V10	561
4	**ST-1**	**47**	**(Japan) D'station Racing**	**(Japan) Kenji Hama (Japan) Satoshi Hoshino (Japan) Tatsuya Hoshino (Japan) Taiga Kabaki (Japan) Tetsuya Tanaka**	**Porsche 911 GT3 Cup (992)**	**548 ‡**
4	**ST-1**	**47**	**(Japan) D'station Racing**	**(Japan) Kenji Hama (Japan) Satoshi Hoshino (Japan) Tatsuya Hoshino (Japan) Taiga Kabaki (Japan) Tetsuya Tanaka**	**Porsche 4.0 L Flat-6**	**548 ‡**
5	**ST-Z**	**25**	**(Japan) Team ZeroOne**	**(Japan) Tsugio Matsuda (Japan) Teppei Natori (Italy) Ronnie Quintarelli (Japan) Kimiya Sato (Japan) Yuki Tanaka (Japan) Masataka Yanagida**	**Nissan Z Nismo GT4**	**545 ‡**
5	**ST-Z**	**25**	**(Japan) Team ZeroOne**	**(Japan) Tsugio Matsuda (Japan) Teppei Natori (Italy) Ronnie Quintarelli (Japan) Kimiya Sato (Japan) Yuki Tanaka (Japan) Masataka Yanagida**	**Nissan VR30DDTT 3.0 L Twin-Turbo V6**	**545 ‡**
6	ST-Z	52	(Japan) Saitama Green Brave	(Japan) Rin Arakawa (Japan) Naoki Hattori (Japan) Seita Nonaka (Japan) Manabu Yamazaki (Japan) Hiroki Yoshida	Toyota GR Supra GT4 Evo2	544
6	ST-Z	52	(Japan) Saitama Green Brave	(Japan) Rin Arakawa (Japan) Naoki Hattori (Japan) Seita Nonaka (Japan) Manabu Yamazaki (Japan) Hiroki Yoshida	BMW B58B30 3.0 L Twin-Turbo I6	544
7	ST-Z	22	(Japan) Porsche Team EBI	(Japan) Ryoma Henzan (Japan) Shota Kitazono (Japan) Rintaro Kubo (Japan) Naoya Yamano	Porsche 718 Cayman GT4 RS Clubsport	542
7	ST-Z	22	(Japan) Porsche Team EBI	(Japan) Ryoma Henzan (Japan) Shota Kitazono (Japan) Rintaro Kubo (Japan) Naoya Yamano	Porsche MDG 4.0 L Flat-6	542
8	ST-Z	885	(Japan) SHADE Racing	(Japan) Katsuyuki Hiranaka (Japan) Yuji Kunimoto (Japan) Hironori Takeuchi (Japan) Yuki Sano	Toyota GR Supra GT4 Evo2	536
8	ST-Z	885	(Japan) SHADE Racing	(Japan) Katsuyuki Hiranaka (Japan) Yuji Kunimoto (Japan) Hironori Takeuchi (Japan) Yuki Sano	BMW B58B30 3.0 L Twin-Turbo I6	536
9	ST-Z	5	(Japan) Team Noah	(Japan) Kokoro Morita (Japan) Takuya Nakazawa (Japan) Yusuke Shiotsu (Japan) Aruga Tomita (Japan) Toshiro Tsukada	Toyota GR Supra GT4 Evo2	532
9	ST-Z	5	(Japan) Team Noah	(Japan) Kokoro Morita (Japan) Takuya Nakazawa (Japan) Yusuke Shiotsu (Japan) Aruga Tomita (Japan) Toshiro Tsukada	BMW B58B30 3.0 L Twin-Turbo I6	532
10	ST-Z	20	(Japan) Team Impul	(Belgium) Bertrand Baguette (Japan) Kazuki Hiramine (Japan) Takashi Matsumoto (Japan) Kazuki Oki (France) Jules Kazuki Tréluyer	Nissan Z Nismo GT4	532
10	ST-Z	20	(Japan) Team Impul	(Belgium) Bertrand Baguette (Japan) Kazuki Hiramine (Japan) Takashi Matsumoto (Japan) Kazuki Oki (France) Jules Kazuki Tréluyer	Nissan VR30DDTT 3.0 L Twin-Turbo V6	532
11	**ST-TCR**	**19**	**(Japan) Birth Racing Project**	**(Japan) Taiga Imoto (Japan) Takashi Kochiya (Japan) Takahisa Ohno (Japan) Hirokazu Okumura (Japan) Jiei Okuzumi (Japan) Takeshi Suehiro**	**Cupra León TCR**	**524 ‡**
11	**ST-TCR**	**19**	**(Japan) Birth Racing Project**	**(Japan) Taiga Imoto (Japan) Takashi Kochiya (Japan) Takahisa Ohno (Japan) Hirokazu Okumura (Japan) Jiei Okuzumi (Japan) Takeshi Suehiro**	**Volkswagen EA888 2.0 R4 TSI 2.0 L Turbo I4**	**524 ‡**
12	**ST-2**	**72**	**(Japan) Nihon Automobile College**	**(Japan) Makoto Kanai (Japan) Toshiya Nojima (Japan) Hiroki Otsu (Japan) Tetsuya Yamano (Japan) Ippei Yamazaki**	**Honda Civic Type R (FL5)**	**523 ‡**
12	**ST-2**	**72**	**(Japan) Nihon Automobile College**	**(Japan) Makoto Kanai (Japan) Toshiya Nojima (Japan) Hiroki Otsu (Japan) Tetsuya Yamano (Japan) Ippei Yamazaki**	**Honda K20C1 2.0 L Turbo I4**	**523 ‡**
13	**ST-Q**	**28**	**(Japan) Toyota Gazoo Rookie Racing**	**(Japan) Nirei Fukuzumi (Japan) Kazuya Oshima (Japan) Aimi Saito (Japan) Eisuke Sasaki (Japan) Daisuke Toyoda (Japan) Sho Tsuboi**	**Toyota GR86 CNF Concept**	**523 ‡**
13	**ST-Q**	**28**	**(Japan) Toyota Gazoo Rookie Racing**	**(Japan) Nirei Fukuzumi (Japan) Kazuya Oshima (Japan) Aimi Saito (Japan) Eisuke Sasaki (Japan) Daisuke Toyoda (Japan) Sho Tsuboi**	**Subaru FA24 2.0 L Flat-4**	**523 ‡**
14	ST-2	95	(Japan) Team Spoon	(Japan) Syun Koide (Japan) Taketoshi Matsui (Japan) Yusuke Mitsui (Japan) Yasunori Nakajima (Japan) Kazuma Nishimura (Japan) Eiji Yamada	Honda Civic Type R (FL5)	522
14	ST-2	95	(Japan) Team Spoon	(Japan) Syun Koide (Japan) Taketoshi Matsui (Japan) Yusuke Mitsui (Japan) Yasunori Nakajima (Japan) Kazuma Nishimura (Japan) Eiji Yamada	Honda K20C1 2.0 L Turbo I4	522
15	ST-Z	111	(Japan) Progress Racing	(Hong Kong) Samuel Hsieh (Hong Kong) Aaron Kwong (Hong Kong) Marchy Lee (China) Ho-Pin Tung (Hong Kong) Sunny Wong (Hong Kong) Andy Yan	Mercedes-AMG GT4	522
15	ST-Z	111	(Japan) Progress Racing	(Hong Kong) Samuel Hsieh (Hong Kong) Aaron Kwong (Hong Kong) Marchy Lee (China) Ho-Pin Tung (Hong Kong) Sunny Wong (Hong Kong) Andy Yan	Mercedes-Benz M178 4.0 L Twin-turbo V8	522
16	**ST-3**	**39**	**(Japan) Tracy Sports with Delta**	**(Japan) Shinya Fujita (Japan) Takashi Ito (Japan) Takuya Otaki (Japan) Takumi Sanada (Japan) Ren Takahashi**	**Lexus RC 350 (GSC10)**	**520 ‡**
16	**ST-3**	**39**	**(Japan) Tracy Sports with Delta**	**(Japan) Shinya Fujita (Japan) Takashi Ito (Japan) Takuya Otaki (Japan) Takumi Sanada (Japan) Ren Takahashi**	**Toyota 2GR-FSE 3.5 L V6**	**520 ‡**
17	ST-Q	61	(Japan) Team SDA Engineering	(Japan) Masafumi Hanazawa (Japan) Takuto Iguchi (Japan) Kazuhiro Ito (Japan) Sususmu Ito (Japan) Hideki Yamauchi	Subaru High Performance X Future Concept	518
17	ST-Q	61	(Japan) Team SDA Engineering	(Japan) Masafumi Hanazawa (Japan) Takuto Iguchi (Japan) Kazuhiro Ito (Japan) Sususmu Ito (Japan) Hideki Yamauchi	Subaru FA24 2.0 L Turbo Flat-4	518
18	ST-2	13	(Japan) Endless Sports	(Japan) Masaya Hanazato (Japan) Mizuki Ishizaka (Japan) Reimei Ito (Japan) Hitoshi Okada	Toyota GR Yaris (GXPA16)	516
18	ST-2	13	(Japan) Endless Sports	(Japan) Masaya Hanazato (Japan) Mizuki Ishizaka (Japan) Reimei Ito (Japan) Hitoshi Okada	Toyota G16E-GTS 1.6 L Turbo I3	516
19	ST-3	38	(Japan) Tracy Sports with Delta	(Japan) Yoshinari Fujiwara (Japan) Tomohiro Hayashi (Japan) Shingo Imai (Japan) Yohei Maruyama (Japan) Yohei Ono (Japan) Toshiyuki Takahashi	Lexus RC 350 (GSC10)	516
19	ST-3	38	(Japan) Tracy Sports with Delta	(Japan) Yoshinari Fujiwara (Japan) Tomohiro Hayashi (Japan) Shingo Imai (Japan) Yohei Maruyama (Japan) Yohei Ono (Japan) Toshiyuki Takahashi	Toyota 2GR-FSE 3.5 L V6	516
20	ST-2	743	(Japan) Honda R&D Challenge	(Japan) Akira Bitoh (Japan) Hiroki Ishigaki (Japan) Hideki Kakinuma (Japan) Junichi Kidachi (Japan) Tomoki Nojiri	Honda Civic Type R (FL5)	516
20	ST-2	743	(Japan) Honda R&D Challenge	(Japan) Akira Bitoh (Japan) Hiroki Ishigaki (Japan) Hideki Kakinuma (Japan) Junichi Kidachi (Japan) Tomoki Nojiri	Honda K20C1 2.0 L Turbo I4	516
21	ST-3	16	(Japan) Okabe Jidosha Motorsport	(Japan) Hibiki Komatsu (Japan) Kazuomi Komatsu (Japan) Masaya Kono (Japan) Atsushi Miyake (Japan) Hironobu Shimizu (Japan) Toru Tanaka	Nissan Fairlady Z (Z34)	515
21	ST-3	16	(Japan) Okabe Jidosha Motorsport	(Japan) Hibiki Komatsu (Japan) Kazuomi Komatsu (Japan) Masaya Kono (Japan) Atsushi Miyake (Japan) Hironobu Shimizu (Japan) Toru Tanaka	Nissan VQ37VHR 3.7 L V6	515
22	**ST-4**	**884**	**(Japan) SHADE Racing**	**(Japan) Masahiko Kageyama (Japan) Morio Nitta (Japan) Eijiro Shimizu (Japan) Shinnosuke Yamada**	**Toyota GR86 (ZN8)**	**510 ‡**
22	**ST-4**	**884**	**(Japan) SHADE Racing**	**(Japan) Masahiko Kageyama (Japan) Morio Nitta (Japan) Eijiro Shimizu (Japan) Shinnosuke Yamada**	**Subaru FA24 2.0 L Flat-4**	**510 ‡**
23	ST-2	225	(Japan) KTMS	(Japan) Tokiya Suzuki (Japan) Hibiki Taira (Japan) Riona Tomishita	Toyota GR Yaris (GXPA16)	510
23	ST-2	225	(Japan) KTMS	(Japan) Tokiya Suzuki (Japan) Hibiki Taira (Japan) Riona Tomishita	Toyota G16E-GTS 1.6 L Turbo I3	510
24	ST-3	15	(Japan) Okabe Jidosha Motorsport	(Japan) Shuji Maejima (Japan) Masaaki Nagashima (Japan) Tsubasa Mekaru (Japan) Yuya Nakajima (Japan) Jun Tashiro	Nissan Fairlady Z (Z34)	509
24	ST-3	15	(Japan) Okabe Jidosha Motorsport	(Japan) Shuji Maejima (Japan) Masaaki Nagashima (Japan) Tsubasa Mekaru (Japan) Yuya Nakajima (Japan) Jun Tashiro	Nissan VQ37VHR 3.7 L V6	509
25	ST-4	41	(Japan) Tracy Sports With Delta	(Japan) Hirotaka Ishii (Japan) Dai Mizuno (Japan) Daichi Okamoto (Japan) Shunsuke Ozaki (Japan) Yusuke Tomibayashi	Toyota GR86 (ZN8)	508
25	ST-4	41	(Japan) Tracy Sports With Delta	(Japan) Hirotaka Ishii (Japan) Dai Mizuno (Japan) Daichi Okamoto (Japan) Shunsuke Ozaki (Japan) Yusuke Tomibayashi	Subaru FA24 2.0 L Flat-4	508
26	ST-2	6	(Japan) Shinryo Racing Team	(Japan) Turbo Asahi (Japan) Yasushi Kikuchi (Japan) Takahiro Matsuzawa (Japan) Masazumi Ohashi (Japan) Tomohiro Tomimasu	Mitsubishi Lancer Evolution X (CZ4A)	503
26	ST-2	6	(Japan) Shinryo Racing Team	(Japan) Turbo Asahi (Japan) Yasushi Kikuchi (Japan) Takahiro Matsuzawa (Japan) Masazumi Ohashi (Japan) Tomohiro Tomimasu	Mitsubishi 4B11T 2.0 L Turbo I4	503
27	ST-Q	12	(Japan) Mazda Spirit Racing	(Japan) Hiroshi Kawata (Japan) Takuya Minowa (Japan) Takahiro Sato (Japan) Yutaka Seki (Japan) Yuui Tsutsumi	Mazda Roadster (NDERC) CNF Concept	500
27	ST-Q	12	(Japan) Mazda Spirit Racing	(Japan) Hiroshi Kawata (Japan) Takuya Minowa (Japan) Takahiro Sato (Japan) Yutaka Seki (Japan) Yuui Tsutsumi	Mazda Skyactiv-G 2.0 L I4	500
28	ST-4	37	(Japan) Team NOPRO	(Japan) Tatsuya Nogami (Japan) Toshihiko Nogami (Japan) Toru Ogura (Japan) Tobio Otani (Japan) Tatsuya Tanigawa (Japan) Ryu Yamamoto	Mazda Roadster (NC)	500
28	ST-4	37	(Japan) Team NOPRO	(Japan) Tatsuya Nogami (Japan) Toshihiko Nogami (Japan) Toru Ogura (Japan) Tobio Otani (Japan) Tatsuya Tanigawa (Japan) Ryu Yamamoto	Mazda MZR LF-VE 2.0 L I4	500
29	ST-X	31	(Japan) apr	(Japan) Naoya Gamou (Japan) Rikuto Kobayashi (Japan) Hideki Nagai (Japan) Hiroaki Nagai (Japan) Koki Saga (Japan) Sena Sakaguchi	Lexus RC F GT3	494
29	ST-X	31	(Japan) apr	(Japan) Naoya Gamou (Japan) Rikuto Kobayashi (Japan) Hideki Nagai (Japan) Hiroaki Nagai (Japan) Koki Saga (Japan) Sena Sakaguchi	Toyota 2UR-GSE 5.0 L V8	494
30	ST-4	3	(Japan) Endless Sports	(Japan) Ryo Ogawa (Japan) Hiroyuki Saka (Japan) Atsushi Shimaya (Japan) Togo Suganami	Toyota GR86 (ZN8)	488
30	ST-4	3	(Japan) Endless Sports	(Japan) Ryo Ogawa (Japan) Hiroyuki Saka (Japan) Atsushi Shimaya (Japan) Togo Suganami	Subaru FA24 2.0 L Flat-4	488
31	ST-4	18	(Japan) Asano Racing Service	(Japan) Takeo Asano (Japan) Daiki Fujiwara (Japan) Shinnosuke Ito (Japan) Takafumi Kondo (Japan) Kazumi Mikami (Japan) Toshikazu Shiba	Toyota GR86 (ZN8)	486
31	ST-4	18	(Japan) Asano Racing Service	(Japan) Takeo Asano (Japan) Daiki Fujiwara (Japan) Shinnosuke Ito (Japan) Takafumi Kondo (Japan) Kazumi Mikami (Japan) Toshikazu Shiba	Subaru FA24 2.0 L Flat-4	486
32	ST-Q	104	(Japan) GR Team Spirit	(Japan) Shunsuke Kohno (Japan) Takamitsu Matsui (Japan) Yuichi Nakayama (Japan) Kazuhiko Omasa (Japan) Ryuta Ukai (Japan) Kenta Yamashita	Toyota GR Yaris DAT Racing Concept	485
32	ST-Q	104	(Japan) GR Team Spirit	(Japan) Shunsuke Kohno (Japan) Takamitsu Matsui (Japan) Yuichi Nakayama (Japan) Kazuhiko Omasa (Japan) Ryuta Ukai (Japan) Kenta Yamashita	Toyota G16E-GTS 1.6 L Turbo I3	485
33	**ST-5R**	**88**	**(Japan) Murakami Motors**	**(Japan) Keiji Amemiya (Japan) Sena Kuronuma (Japan) Hiroyuki Murakami (Japan) Tatsuya Ohta (Japan) Takuya Shiga (Japan) Soichiro Yoshida**	**Mazda Roadster (ND5RC)**	**480 ‡**
33	**ST-5R**	**88**	**(Japan) Murakami Motors**	**(Japan) Keiji Amemiya (Japan) Sena Kuronuma (Japan) Hiroyuki Murakami (Japan) Tatsuya Ohta (Japan) Takuya Shiga (Japan) Soichiro Yoshida**	**Mazda Skyactiv-G 1.5 L I4**	**480 ‡**
34	ST-5R	610	(Japan) Koshido Racing	(Japan) Yasuji Asai (Japan) Kento Omiya (Japan) Motoharu Sato (Japan) Yusaku Shibata (Japan) Kengo Yamamoto	Mazda Roadster (ND5RC)	477
34	ST-5R	610	(Japan) Koshido Racing	(Japan) Yasuji Asai (Japan) Kento Omiya (Japan) Motoharu Sato (Japan) Yusaku Shibata (Japan) Kengo Yamamoto	Mazda Skyactiv-G 1.5 L I4	477
35	**ST-5F**	**821**	**(Japan) AndLegal Racing**	**(Japan) Masaki Baba (Japan) Junichiro Kasahara (Japan) Kenta Kawafuku (Japan) Katsuhiro Sato (Japan) Takuya Shiga (Japan) Hiroshi Ueda**	**Honda Fit 3 RS (GK5)**	**477 ‡**
35	**ST-5F**	**821**	**(Japan) AndLegal Racing**	**(Japan) Masaki Baba (Japan) Junichiro Kasahara (Japan) Kenta Kawafuku (Japan) Katsuhiro Sato (Japan) Takuya Shiga (Japan) Hiroshi Ueda**	**Honda L15Z 1.5 L I4**	**477 ‡**
36	ST-5R	120	(Japan) Club Mazda Spirit Racing Roadster	(Japan) Tatsuhiko Katoh (Japan) Subaru Kumeta (Japan) Taisei Matsubara (Japan) Takumi Minamisawa (Japan) Junji Ueda	Mazda Roadster (ND5RC)	476
36	ST-5R	120	(Japan) Club Mazda Spirit Racing Roadster	(Japan) Tatsuhiko Katoh (Japan) Subaru Kumeta (Japan) Taisei Matsubara (Japan) Takumi Minamisawa (Japan) Junji Ueda	Mazda Skyactiv-G 1.5 L I4	476
37	ST-5F	11	(Japan) Sakae Motor Sports	(Japan) Ryuichi Furuido (Japan) Hidenori Miwa (Japan) Masaharu Nishioka (Japan) Piston Nishizawa (Japan) Hajime Omono (Japan) Ryohei Oshimae	Honda Fit 3 RS (GK5)	475
37	ST-5F	11	(Japan) Sakae Motor Sports	(Japan) Ryuichi Furuido (Japan) Hidenori Miwa (Japan) Masaharu Nishioka (Japan) Piston Nishizawa (Japan) Hajime Omono (Japan) Ryohei Oshimae	Honda L15Z 1.5 L I4	475
38	ST-5F	222	(Japan) Honda Cars Tokai	(Japan) Hiroshi Ito (Japan) Masaki Nishihata (Japan) Masayuki Sumi (Japan) Toshiki Takeuchi	Honda Fit4 RS (GS4)	473
38	ST-5F	222	(Japan) Honda Cars Tokai	(Japan) Hiroshi Ito (Japan) Masaki Nishihata (Japan) Masayuki Sumi (Japan) Toshiki Takeuchi	Honda L15Z 1.5 L I4	473
39	ST-1	2	(Japan) K's Frontier KTM Cars	(Japan) Taiyo Ida (Japan) Hiroki Katoh (Japan) Takashi Kobayashi (Japan) Kazuho Takahashi (Japan) Hiroki Yoshimoto	KTM X-Bow GTX	472
39	ST-1	2	(Japan) K's Frontier KTM Cars	(Japan) Taiyo Ida (Japan) Hiroki Katoh (Japan) Takashi Kobayashi (Japan) Kazuho Takahashi (Japan) Hiroki Yoshimoto	Volkswagen EA855 R5 2.5 L I5 TFSi	472
40	ST-5F	67	(Japan) Team Yamato	(Japan) Ryo Mukumoto (Japan) Shinya Uchiyama (Japan) Ryohei Yasui	Honda Fit 3 RS (GK5)	470
40	ST-5F	67	(Japan) Team Yamato	(Japan) Ryo Mukumoto (Japan) Shinya Uchiyama (Japan) Ryohei Yasui	Honda L15Z 1.5 L I4	470
41	ST-Q	32	(Japan) Toyota Gazoo Rookie Racing	(Japan) Mako Hirakawa (Japan) Hiroaki Ishiura (Japan) Kazuki Nakajima (Japan) Yasuhiro Ogura (Japan) Masahiro Sasaki (Japan) Akio Toyoda	Toyota GR Corolla H2 Concept	468
41	ST-Q	32	(Japan) Toyota Gazoo Rookie Racing	(Japan) Mako Hirakawa (Japan) Hiroaki Ishiura (Japan) Kazuki Nakajima (Japan) Yasuhiro Ogura (Japan) Masahiro Sasaki (Japan) Akio Toyoda	Toyota G16E-GTS 1.6 L Turbo I3	468
42	ST-5F	4	(Japan) Team Bride	(Japan) Kaoru Arai (Japan) Kuniyuki Haga (Japan) Shunya Ito (Japan) Yuya Ohta (Japan) Yoshikazu Sabu (Japan) Takao Seto	Honda Fit4 RS (GS4)	463
42	ST-5F	4	(Japan) Team Bride	(Japan) Kaoru Arai (Japan) Kuniyuki Haga (Japan) Shunya Ito (Japan) Yuya Ohta (Japan) Yoshikazu Sabu (Japan) Takao Seto	Honda L15Z 1.5 L I4	463
43	ST-5R	76	(Japan) Progress Racing	(Japan) Yuya Egi (Japan) Junpei Kato (Japan) Hitoshi Sakai (Japan) Masakazu Sakai (Japan) Kazutaka Tokufuji (Japan) Nanami Tsukamoto	Mazda Roadster (ND5RC)	460
43	ST-5R	76	(Japan) Progress Racing	(Japan) Yuya Egi (Japan) Junpei Kato (Japan) Hitoshi Sakai (Japan) Masakazu Sakai (Japan) Kazutaka Tokufuji (Japan) Nanami Tsukamoto	Mazda Skyactiv-G 1.5 L I4	460
44	ST-5R	50	(Japan) Lovedrive Racing	(Japan) Junko Fujii (Japan) Yasuhiro Ito (Japan) Mitsutaka Kimura (Chinese Taipei) Hung Mingwei (Japan) Ryoko Nakamura (Japan) Keita Sawa	Mazda Roadster (ND5RC)	460
44	ST-5R	50	(Japan) Lovedrive Racing	(Japan) Junko Fujii (Japan) Yasuhiro Ito (Japan) Mitsutaka Kimura (Chinese Taipei) Hung Mingwei (Japan) Ryoko Nakamura (Japan) Keita Sawa	Mazda Skyactiv-G 1.5 L I4	460
45	ST-X	81	(Japan) GTNET MotorSports	(Japan) Takayuki Aoki (Japan) Iori Kimura (Japan) Nobuyuki Oyagi (Japan) Ryuichiro Oyagi (Japan) Natsu Sakaguchi	Nissan GT-R Nismo GT3	457
45	ST-X	81	(Japan) GTNET MotorSports	(Japan) Takayuki Aoki (Japan) Iori Kimura (Japan) Nobuyuki Oyagi (Japan) Ryuichiro Oyagi (Japan) Natsu Sakaguchi	Nissan VR38DETT 3.8 L Twin-turbo V6	457
46	ST-TCR	98	(Japan) Waimarama Racing	(France) Giuliano Alesi (Japan) Katsumasa Chiyo (South Korea) Lee Jung-Woo (Japan) Ryusuke Masumoto (Japan) Shigeru Sato (Japan) Hironobu Yasuda	Hyundai Elantra N TCR (2024)	456
46	ST-TCR	98	(Japan) Waimarama Racing	(France) Giuliano Alesi (Japan) Katsumasa Chiyo (South Korea) Lee Jung-Woo (Japan) Ryusuke Masumoto (Japan) Shigeru Sato (Japan) Hironobu Yasuda	Hyundai Theta II G4KD I4 2.0 L Turbo I4	456
47	ST-5R	89	(Japan) Murakami Motors	(Japan) Koki Ebukuro (Japan) Mai Hiwatari (Japan) Marie Iwaoka (Japan) "Makoto" (Japan) Shinichi Uemura (Japan) Naohiro Yonekawa	Mazda Roadster (ND5RC)	453
47	ST-5R	89	(Japan) Murakami Motors	(Japan) Koki Ebukuro (Japan) Mai Hiwatari (Japan) Marie Iwaoka (Japan) "Makoto" (Japan) Shinichi Uemura (Japan) Naohiro Yonekawa	Mazda Skyactiv-G 1.5 L I4	453
48	ST-2	36	(Japan) HCM Uchino Racing	(Japan) Toshijiro Akutsu (Japan) Jun Doi (Japan) Koichi Iwama (Japan) Yasunori Matsumoto (Japan) Takuto Sakai (Japan) Noriaki Uchino	Honda Civic Type R (FL5)	442
48	ST-2	36	(Japan) HCM Uchino Racing	(Japan) Toshijiro Akutsu (Japan) Jun Doi (Japan) Koichi Iwama (Japan) Yasunori Matsumoto (Japan) Takuto Sakai (Japan) Noriaki Uchino	Honda K20C1 2.0 L Turbo I4	442
49	ST-Z	21	(Japan) Hitotsuyama Racing	(Italy) Alessandro Bressan (Japan) Munehisa Iijima (Finland) Max Salo (United Kingdom) Sean Walkinshaw (Canada) Jim Walsh (Japan) Daisuke Yamawaki	Mercedes-AMG GT4	439
49	ST-Z	21	(Japan) Hitotsuyama Racing	(Italy) Alessandro Bressan (Japan) Munehisa Iijima (Finland) Max Salo (United Kingdom) Sean Walkinshaw (Canada) Jim Walsh (Japan) Daisuke Yamawaki	Mercedes-Benz M178 4.0 L Twin-turbo V8	439
50	ST-4	66	(Japan) Team NOPRO	(Japan) Tatsuya Nogami (Japan) Toshihiko Nogami (Japan) Toru Ogura (Japan) Tobio Otani (Japan) Tatsuya Tanigawa (Japan) Ryu Yamamoto	Mazda Roadster (NC)	428
50	ST-4	66	(Japan) Team NOPRO	(Japan) Tatsuya Nogami (Japan) Toshihiko Nogami (Japan) Toru Ogura (Japan) Tobio Otani (Japan) Tatsuya Tanigawa (Japan) Ryu Yamamoto	Mazda MZR LF-VE 2.0 L I4	428
51	ST-2	7	(Japan) Shinryo Racing Team	(Japan) Keisuke Anzai (Japan) Hitoshi Gotoh (Japan) Kazuaki Kimura (Japan) Tatsuya Okahara (Japan) Hisahiko Usui (Japan) Kazunari Yoshioka	Mitsubishi Lancer Evolution X (CZ4A)	426
51	ST-2	7	(Japan) Shinryo Racing Team	(Japan) Keisuke Anzai (Japan) Hitoshi Gotoh (Japan) Kazuaki Kimura (Japan) Tatsuya Okahara (Japan) Hisahiko Usui (Japan) Kazunari Yoshioka	Mitsubishi 4B11T 2.0 L Turbo I4	426
52	ST-5R	65	(Japan) Over Drive	(Japan) Shuichiro Hokazono (Japan) Hirohito Ito (Japan) Eiji Niwa (Japan) Kunihiro Miyazaki (Japan) Shogo Nishikawa	Mazda Roadster (ND5RC)	392
52	ST-5R	65	(Japan) Over Drive	(Japan) Shuichiro Hokazono (Japan) Hirohito Ito (Japan) Eiji Niwa (Japan) Kunihiro Miyazaki (Japan) Shogo Nishikawa	Mazda Skyactiv-G 1.5 L I4	392
53	ST-Q	55	(Japan) Mazda Spirit Racing	(Japan) Kaoru Ijiri (Japan) Shinichi Katsura (Japan) Ikuo Maeda (Japan) Ryohei Sakaguchi (Japan) Kazuhiro Terakawa	Mazda3 Bio Concept	383
53	ST-Q	55	(Japan) Mazda Spirit Racing	(Japan) Kaoru Ijiri (Japan) Shinichi Katsura (Japan) Ikuo Maeda (Japan) Ryohei Sakaguchi (Japan) Kazuhiro Terakawa	Mazda Skyactiv-D 2.2 L Turbo-Diesel I4	383
DNF	ST-4	60	(Japan) Zenyaku With Team G/Motion	(Japan) Shun Ito (Japan) Masayuki Minato (Japan) Keisuke Ohara (Japan) Resshu Shioya (Japan) Takumi Umehara	Toyota GR86 (ZN8)	491
DNF	ST-4	60	(Japan) Zenyaku With Team G/Motion	(Japan) Shun Ito (Japan) Masayuki Minato (Japan) Keisuke Ohara (Japan) Resshu Shioya (Japan) Takumi Umehara	Subaru FA24 2.0 L Flat-4	491
DNF	ST-X	33	(Hong Kong) Craft-Bamboo Racing	(Canada) Dean Chen (Germany) Tom Kalender (Chinese Taipei) Jeffrey Lee (Japan) Seiya Motojima (Japan) Kakunoshin Ohta	Mercedes-AMG GT3 Evo	445
DNF	ST-X	33	(Hong Kong) Craft-Bamboo Racing	(Canada) Dean Chen (Germany) Tom Kalender (Chinese Taipei) Jeffrey Lee (Japan) Seiya Motojima (Japan) Kakunoshin Ohta	Mercedes-AMG M159 6.2 L V8	445
DNF	ST-4	290	(Japan) AutoLabo	(Japan) Daisuke Ito (Japan) Kazunori Nishimura (Japan) Natsuki Obi (Japan) Yuichi Yoko	Suzuki Swift Sport (ZC33S)	335
DNF	ST-4	290	(Japan) AutoLabo	(Japan) Daisuke Ito (Japan) Kazunori Nishimura (Japan) Natsuki Obi (Japan) Yuichi Yoko	Suzuki K14C Boosterjet 1.4 L Turbo I4	335
DNF	ST-5F	110	(Japan) Access Racing Team	(United States) Hana Burton (Japan) "Ishibashi" (Japan) Toshiyuki Matsuda (Japan) Sota Muto (Japan) Mark Sekiya	Toyota Vitz (NCP131)	320
DNF	ST-5F	110	(Japan) Access Racing Team	(United States) Hana Burton (Japan) "Ishibashi" (Japan) Toshiyuki Matsuda (Japan) Sota Muto (Japan) Mark Sekiya	Toyota 1NZ-FE 1.5 L I4	320
DNF	ST-4	216	(Japan) HMR Racing	(Japan) Kensuke Ehara (Japan) Toshihito Funai (Japan) Kosuke Ito (Japan) Tetsuya Moriyama (Japan) Naoryu Sakamoto (Japan) Kota Sasaki	Toyota GR86 (ZN8)	290
DNF	ST-4	216	(Japan) HMR Racing	(Japan) Kensuke Ehara (Japan) Toshihito Funai (Japan) Kosuke Ito (Japan) Tetsuya Moriyama (Japan) Naoryu Sakamoto (Japan) Kota Sasaki	Subaru FA24 2.0 L Flat-4	290
DNF	ST-Z	26	(Japan) Team ZeroOne	(Brazil) Igor Omura Fraga (Japan) Ryuichiro Otsuka (Japan) Takuro Shinohara (Japan) Ryuichiro Tomita	Nissan Z Nismo GT4	239
DNF	ST-Z	26	(Japan) Team ZeroOne	(Brazil) Igor Omura Fraga (Japan) Ryuichiro Otsuka (Japan) Takuro Shinohara (Japan) Ryuichiro Tomita	Nissan VR30DDTT 3.0 L Twin-Turbo V6	239
DNF	ST-5F	17	(Japan) Team NOPRO	(Japan) Masataka Inoue (Japan) Yoshihiro Kato (Japan) Osamu Kondo (Japan) Misaki Konishi (Japan) Takashi Ōi (Japan) Hiroaki Yamamoto	Mazda2 Diesel Turbo (DJ5FS)	0
DNF	ST-5F	17	(Japan) Team NOPRO	(Japan) Masataka Inoue (Japan) Yoshihiro Kato (Japan) Osamu Kondo (Japan) Misaki Konishi (Japan) Takashi Ōi (Japan) Hiroaki Yamamoto	Mazda Skyactiv-D S5-DPTS 1.5 L Turbo-diesel I4	0

Super Taikyu Series
Previous race: Suzuka 5 Hours	2025 season	Next race: SUGO 4 Hours
