= Shunji Okumoto =

Japanese racing driver

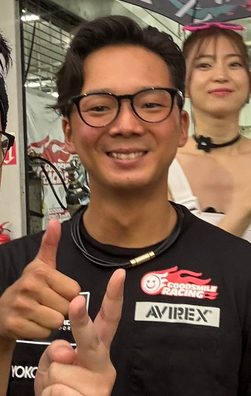
- Okumoto at the 2025 Super GT Malaysia Festival
- Nationality: (Japan) Japanese
- Born: 9 April 1999 (age 27) Osaka, Japan

Super GT - GT300 career
- Debut season: 2025
- Current team: Goodsmile Racing & TeamUKYO
- Car number: 4

Previous series
- 2022-2023: F4 Japanese Championship

Shunji Okumoto (奥本 隼士, Okumoto Shunji; born 9 April 1999) is a Japanese racing driver set to compete in Super GT GT300 and Super Taikyu ST-X class.

== Career ==
=== Formula 4 ===
Okumoto made his debut in formula racing in 2022 in F4 Japanese Championship with Team Heroes. Okumoto then moved to TGR-DC Racing School for 2023, where he clinched two podiums and finished ninth in the standings.

=== Super GT ===
Okumoto made his debut in Super GT in 2025, as he joined Goodsmile Racing & TeamUKYO for round 3 in Sepang International Circuit along with Yuhki Nakayama as the regular drivers Nobuteru Taniguchi and Tatsuya Kataoka prioritized the Spa 24 Hours.

=== Other series ===
Okumoto made his debut in Super Taikyu in 2023 as he race in ST-2 class with Kobe Toyopet Motor Sports in 2023 alongside Kengo Ichijo, Rin Arakawa, and Jiei Okuzumi. Okuzumi stayed with the team with Rikuto Kobayashi and Jin Nakamura replacing Arakawa and Okuzumi. Okumoto drove the team to the title. Okumoto then stepped up to ST-X class in 2025, where he joined TKRI alongside team owner Tatsuya Kataoka, Yuhki Nakayama, and Daisuke Matsunaga.

== Racing record ==
=== Career summary ===
Season	Series	Team	Races	Wins	Poles	FLaps	Podiums	Points	Position
2022	F4 Japanese Championship	Team Hero's	14	0	0	0	0	6	19th
2023	F4 Japanese Championship	TGR-DC Racing School	14	0	0	0	2	63	9th
2023	Super Taikyu - ST-2	Kobe Toyopet Motor Sports	6	1	2	5	1	95‡	4th‡
2024	Super Taikyu - ST-2	KTMS	6	3	1	1	4	124‡	**1st‡**
2024	Super GT - GT300	R&D Sport	Reserve driver						
2025	Super GT - GT300	Goodsmile Racing & TeamUKYO	1	0	0	1	1	16	24th
2025	Super Taikyu - ST-X	TKRI	7	1	0	0	5	129‡	**2nd‡**
2025	Nürburgring Langstrecken-Serie - SP8T	KCMG							
2025	TGR GR86/BRZ Cup	Team Takuty	6	0	0	1	0	4	21st
2026	Nürburgring Langstrecken-Serie - SP10	Toyo Tires with Ring Racing							
2026	Formula Regional Japanese Championship	Rn-sports	2	0	0	0	0	20	14th
2026	Super Taikyu - ST-2	KTMS							
2026	TGR GR86/BRZ Cup	Team Takuty							

‡ Team standings

=== Complete F4 Japanese Championship results ===
(key) (Races in bold indicate pole position) (Races in italics indicate fastest lap)

Year	Team	1	2	3	4	5	6	7	8	9	10	11	12	13	14	DC	Points
2022	Team Hero's	FUJ1; 1; 7	FUJ1; 2; 13	SUZ; 1; 13	SUZ; 2; 13	FUJ2; 1; 12	FUJ2; 2; 12	SUZ2; 1; 15	SUZ2; 2; 13	SUG; 1; 17	SUG; 2; 11	AUT; 1; 15	AUT; 2; 17	MOT; 1; 15	MOT; 2; 14	19th	6
2023	TGR-DC Racing School	FUJ1; 1; 2	FUJ1; 2; 7	SUZ; 1; 10	SUZ; 2; 7	FUJ2; 1; 11	FUJ2; 2; 10	SUZ2; 1; 15	SUZ2; 2; 10	SUG; 1; 12	SUG; 2; 11	AUT; 1; 4	AUT; 2; 2	MOT; 1; 12	MOT; 2; 20	9th	63

=== Complete Super GT results ===
(key) (Races in bold indicate pole position) (Races in italics indicate fastest lap)

Year	Team	Car	Class	1	2	3	4	5	6	7	8	9	DC	Points
2025	Goodsmile Racing & TeamUKYO	Mercedes-AMG GT3 Evo	GT300	OKA	FUJ	SEP; 3	FS1	FS2	SUZ	SUG	AUT	MOT	24th	16

=== Complete Formula Regional Japanese Championship results ===
(key) (Races in bold indicate pole position) (Races in italics indicate fastest lap)

Year	Entrant	1	2	3	4	5	6	7	8	9	10	11	12	13	14	Pos	Points
2026	Rn-sports	SUZ1; 1	SUZ1; 2	SUZ1; 3	SUZ2; 1; 6	SUZ2; 2; 4	MOT; 1	MOT; 2	SUG; 1	SUG; 2	SUG; 3	FUJ1; 1	FUJ1; 2	FUJ2; 1	FUJ2; 2	14th	20
