= 2023 F4 Japanese Championship =

Formula 4 championship

The 2023 F4 Japanese Championship season was the ninth season of the F4 Japanese Championship. It was competed with 14 races over seven double-header rounds.

== Teams and drivers ==
All teams & drivers were Japanese-registered.

Team	No.	Driver	Class	Rounds
Akiland Racing	2	Keiji Nakao	I	All
Akiland Racing	10	Masayuki Ueda	I	All
Akiland Racing	12	Ryota Horachi		All
Akiland Racing	18	Kazuya Oshima		1
Akiland Racing	18	Norio Tsukamoto	I	2–5
Akiland Racing	18	Aoto Nagahara		6
Akiland Racing	22	Yuta Fujiwara		All
Akiland Racing	71	Masayoshi Oyama	I	All
Akiland Racing	96	Makio Saito	I	All
DayDream Racing	4	Yuichi Sasaki	I	5–7
Honda Formula Dream Project	5	Yusuke Mitsui		All
Honda Formula Dream Project	6	Yuto Nomura		All
Honda Formula Dream Project	7	Tosei Moriyama		All
Team GMB	8	Masamune Handa		1–5
Spread	8	Masamune Handa		6–7
Rn-sports	11	Isao Nakashima	I	All
Rn-sports	99	Yoshitsugu Kondo	I	1, 5
Rn-sports	99	Kazuaki Yasui	I	3
B-Max Racing Team	13	Makoto Fujiwara	I	All
B-Max Racing Team	27	"Syuji"	I	6
B-Max Racing Team	30	"Dragon"	I	All
B-Max Racing Team	44	Nobuhiro Imada	I	1–6
B-Max Racing Team	44	"Syuji"	I	7
Zap Speed	14	Souryuu Tagami		1–4, 7
Zap Speed	86	Hachiro Osaka	I	1–4
Zap Speed	87	Rio Shimono		1–4
Zap Speed	88	Rin Arakawa		1–4
Media Do Kageyama Racing	15	Tomohito Watabe		1–5
Media Do Kageyama Racing	16	Kazuma Nishimura		1–5, 7
Media Do Kageyama Racing	26	Reijiro Yamazaki	I	All
Eagle Sports	21	Tadakazu Kojima	I	1–6
Eagle Sports	49	Bunsei Okawa	I	1–2
Eagle Sports	49	Akito Itsuki		3
Eagle Sports	49	Daitetsu Ueno		4
Eagle Sports	49	Shoichiro Akamatsu	I	5–6
NSPEED	23	"Yugo"	I	All
Tsuyoshi Usui	24	Tsuyoshi Usui	I	2, 6
TOM'S Youth	28	Yoshiaki Nakamura		All
Buzz Racing	31	Ryoma Henzan		All
Buzz Racing	32	Taiga Imoto		2
Buzz Racing	41	Taiga Imoto		3–4
Buzz Racing	41	Masahiro Aoai	I	1–2
Drago Corse	34	Hironobu Shimizu		All
TGR-DC Racing School	35	Jin Nakamura		All
TGR-DC Racing School	36	Rikuto Kobayashi		All
TGR-DC Racing School	37	Yuki Sano		All
TGR-DC Racing School	38	Shunji Okumoto		All
PONOS Racing	45	Kento Omiya		All
Fujita Pharmacy Racing	46	Kohei Tokumasu		1–5, 7
Fujita Pharmacy Racing	48	Fuma Horio		1–5
Field Motorsports	55	"Kentaro"	I	All
HELM Motorsports	61	Jiei Okuzumi		3
HELM Motorsports	62	Itsuki Sato		All
HELM Motorsports	63	Yutaka Toriba	I	1–3, 5–7
Skill Speed	77	Hibiki Komatsu		All
Skill Speed	78	Yohei Ono		All
OTG Motor Sports	80	Yuto Nozawa		All
Bionic Jack Racing	81	Kazuhisa Urabe		All
Bionic Jack Racing	97	Shion Tsujimoto		1–2
Bionic Jack Racing	97	Hiroyuki Saka	I	3–4
Bionic Jack Racing	97	Jiei Okuzumi		5–7
Bionic Jack Racing	98	Yuki Mishima		All
Dr.Dry	86	Hachiro Osaka	I	5–7
Dr.Dry	87	Rio Shimono		5–7
Dr.Dry	88	Rin Arakawa		5–7

Icon	Class
I	Independent Cup

== Race calendar and results ==
All rounds were held in Japan and supported the Super GT events.

Round		Circuit	Date	Pole position	Fastest lap	Winning driver	Winning team	Independent Cup winner
1	R1	Fuji Speedway, Oyama	3 May	Rikuto Kobayashi	Rin Arakawa	Rikuto Kobayashi	TGR-DC Racing School	Yutaka Toriba
1	R2	Fuji Speedway, Oyama	4 May	Rikuto Kobayashi	Yusuke Mitsui	Jin Nakamura (Note: Yusuke Mitsui finished as the first but received a drive through penalty converted into 40 seconds for an illegal start on a safety car restart. Nakamura inherited the win.)	TGR-DC Racing School	Makoto Fujiwara
2	R3	Suzuka Circuit, Suzuka	3 June	Yusuke Mitsui	Rikuto Kobayashi	Yusuke Mitsui	Honda Formula Dream Project	Masayuki Ueda
2	R4	Suzuka Circuit, Suzuka	4 June	Yusuke Mitsui	Yusuke Mitsui	Yusuke Mitsui	Honda Formula Dream Project	Masayuki Ueda
3	R5	Fuji Speedway, Oyama	5 August	Yuto Nomura	Ryota Horachi	Rikuto Kobayashi	TGR-DC Racing School	Nobuhiro Imada
3	R6	Fuji Speedway, Oyama	6 August	Yuto Nomura	Rikuto Kobayashi	Rikuto Kobayashi	TGR-DC Racing School	Yutaka Toriba
4	R7	Suzuka Circuit, Suzuka	26 August	Yusuke Mitsui	Yuto Nomura	Yusuke Mitsui	Honda Formula Dream Project	Makio Saito
4	R8	Suzuka Circuit, Suzuka	27 August	Yusuke Mitsui	Yuto Nomura	Yusuke Mitsui	Honda Formula Dream Project	Nobuhiro Imada
5	R9	Sportsland Sugo, Murata	16 September	Yuto Nomura	Jin Nakamura	Yuto Nomura	Honda Formula Dream Project	Makoto Fujiwara
5	R10	Sportsland Sugo, Murata	17 September	Kazuhisa Urabe	Yuto Nomura	Kazuhisa Urabe	Bionic Jack Racing	Makoto Fujiwara
6	R11	Autopolis, Hita	14 October	Rikuto Kobayashi	Yusuke Mitsui	Rikuto Kobayashi	TGR-DC Racing School	Yutaka Toriba
6	R12	Autopolis, Hita	15 October	Jin Nakamura	Jin Nakamura	Jin Nakamura	TGR-DC Racing School	Yutaka Toriba
7	R13	Mobility Resort Motegi, Motegi	4 November	Rikuto Kobayashi	Rikuto Kobayashi	Jin Nakamura	TGR-DC Racing School	Yutaka Toriba
7	R14	Mobility Resort Motegi, Motegi	5 November	Rikuto Kobayashi	Rin Arakawa	Rikuto Kobayashi	TGR-DC Racing School	Keiji Nakao

== Championship standings ==
Points were awarded as follows:

Position	**1st**	**2nd**	**3rd**	**4th**	**5th**	**6th**	**7th**	**8th**	**9th**	**10th**
Points	25	18	15	12	10	8	6	4	2	1

=== Drivers' standings ===
Pos	Driver	FUJ1		SUZ1		FUJ2		SUZ2		SUG		AUT		MOT		Pts
Pos	Driver	R1	R2	R3	R4	R5	R6	R7	R8	R9	R10	R11	R12	R13	R14	Pts
1	Rikuto Kobayashi	**1**	**3**	2	4	1	1	33	5	6	22	**1**	3	**2**	**1**	221
2	Jin Nakamura	Ret	1	Ret	6	3	2	2	3	4	4	2	**1**	1	2	209
3	Yusuke Mitsui	Ret	28	**1**	**1**	4	4	**1**	**1**	2	2	3	10	10	8	181
4	Yuto Nomura	Ret	2	3	3	**2**	**3**	3	2	**1**	24	6	5	Ret	5	167
5	Tosei Moriyama	9	5	4	2	5	6	Ret	9	5	3	7	6	11	Ret	101
6	Rin Arakawa	34	4	5	5	7	8	8	20	8	7	11	8	3	12	75
7	Yuki Sano	3	9	8	11	Ret	5	6	Ret	3	5	5	40	Ret	37	74
8	Kazuhisa Urabe	20	8	43†	10	10	12	9	6	7	**1**	10	7	5	6	72
9	Shunji Okumoto	2	7	10	7	11	10	15	10	12	11	4	2	12	20	63
10	Ryota Horachi	6	13	9	8	15	37	4	4	11	10	8	4	Ret	10	56
11	Kento Omiya	15	Ret	7	9	8	11	5	8	19	9	9	Ret	6	3	53
12	Ryoma Henzan	Ret	Ret	11	15	Ret	7	7	7	Ret	8	14	9	4	4	48
13	Itsuki Sato	28	6	6	13	9	9	10	11	9	12	12	11	9	9	27
14	Jiei Okuzumi					6	39			10	13	13	15	8	7	19
15	Kazuma Nishimura	4	12	14	19	18	Ret	DNS	16	18	23			16	19	12
16	Yuki Mishima	5	10	17	18	Ret	31	18	15	17	19	20	18	20	17	11
17	Yuta Fujiwara	10	14	13	12	12	14	12	12	Ret	6	15	13	34	13	9
18	Souryuu Tagami	12	15	18	17	20	Ret	14	24					7	11	6
19	Rio Shimono	7	18	19	20	19	24	19	19	16	17	17	16	17	15	6
20	Hibiki Komatsu	8	19	15	16	13	13	Ret	13	21	20	18	12	Ret	Ret	4
21	Hironobu Shimizu	Ret	11	12	14	22	18	13	18	14	16	22	28	15	21	0
22	Kohei Tokumasu	Ret	17	16	23	21	15	11	14	13	14			18	18	0
23	Tomohito Watabe	11	37	21	24	14	17	16	17	WD	WD					0
24	Yuto Nozawa	19	20	23	25	16	16	22	21	15	15	16	17	13	14	0
25	Kazuya Oshima	13	16													0
26	Yoshiaki Nakamura	14	DNS	24	26	24	21	23	23	Ret	18	19	14	14	16	0
27	Yutaka Toriba	16	Ret	36	34	Ret	19			33	29	23	20	19	28	0
28	Keiji Nakao	17	23	30	31	26	27	26	28	29	28	40†	26	32	23	0
29	Akito Itsuki					17	23									0
30	Daitetsu Ueno							17	38							0
31	Fuma Horio	18	Ret	25	28	Ret	25	21	29	20	20					0
32	Yohei Ono	27	26	28	29	32	38	25	31	Ret	Ret	24	19	26	29	0
33	Taiga Imoto			22	21	23	20	20	22							0
34	Shion Tsujimoto	Ret	Ret	20	22											0
35	Masamune Handa	33	27	Ret	Ret	34	26	27	26	25	30	21	21	21	22	0
36	Makoto Fujiwara	22	21	31	41	28	28	Ret	32	22	25	25	22	24	26	0
37	Nobuhiro Imada	21	38	37	Ret	25	DNS	Ret	25	23	Ret	27	24			0
38	Masayuki Ueda	38	22	26	27	29	29	32	Ret	31	27	Ret	33	22	27	0
39	Makio Saito	26	33	27	30	27	22	24	39	27	40	26	41	23	24	0
40	"Dragon"	23	24	29	Ret	DNQ	DNQ	29	27	26	26	Ret	25	25	25	0
41	Aoto Nagahara											38	23			0
42	Reijiro Yamazaki	24	25	DNQ	DNQ	39†	35	Ret	30	Ret	Ret	28	29	27	30	0
43	"Kentaro"	31	30	33	42†	30	Ret	Ret	40†	24	34	31	36	Ret	34	0
44	Yoshitsugu Kondo	25	29							28	31					0
45	Tadakazu Kojima	30	36	42	38	33	Ret	28	Ret	32	38	29	27			0
46	Yuichi Sasaki									36	33	34	34	28	Ret	0
47	Masayoshi Oyama	32	32	35	33	36	33	Ret	34	30	32	30	32	29	31	0
48	Hachiro Osaka	29	Ret	41	40	40†	Ret	Ret	36	37	37	35	35	30	32	0
49	Isao Nakashima	35	31	34	32	38	34	Ret	DNS	35	35	32	30	31	33	0
50	Hiroyuki Saka					31	30	Ret	33							0
51	Norio Tsukamoto			38	36	35	32	30	35	38	36					0
52	"Yugo"	DNQ	DNQ	40	39	37	36	31	37	39	Ret	39	39	33	36	0
53	Shoichiro Akamatsu									34	39	37	31			0
54	Bunsei Okawa	36	35	32	35											0
55	Tsuyoshi Usui			DNS	DNS							33	38			0
56	Masahiro Aoai	37	34	39	37											0
57	"Syuji"											36	37	Ret	35	0
–	Kazuaki Yasui					DNQ	DNQ									–
Pos	Driver	R1	R2	R3	R4	R5	R6	R7	R8	R9	R10	R11	R12	R13	R14	Pts
Pos	Driver	FUJ1		SUZ1		FUJ2		SUZ2		SUG		AUT		MOT		Pts

Colour	Result
Gold	Winner
Silver	Second place
Bronze	Third place
Green	Points classification
Blue	Non-points classification
Blue	Non-classified finish (NC)
Purple	Retired, not classified (Ret)
Red	Did not qualify (DNQ)
Red	Did not pre-qualify (DNPQ)
Black	Disqualified (DSQ)
White	Did not start (DNS)
White	Withdrew (WD)
White	Race cancelled (C)
Blank	Did not practice (DNP)
Blank	Did not arrive (DNA)
Blank	Excluded (EX)

**Bold** – Pole
Italics – Fastest Lap
† — Did not finish but classified

=== Independent Cup ===
Pos	Driver	FUJ1		SUZ1		FUJ2		SUZ2		SUG		AUT		MOT		Pts
Pos	Driver	R1	R2	R3	R4	R5	R6	R7	R8	R9	R10	R11	R12	R13	R14	Pts
1	Makoto Fujiwara	4	1	5	13	4	4	Ret	5	1	1	2	2	4	4	191
2	Keiji Nakao	2	3	4	3	2	3	2	3	7	4	16†	5	11	1	179
3	Makio Saito	8	10	2	2	3	2	1	11	5	15	3	18	3	2	157
4	Yutaka Toriba	1	Ret	10	6	Ret	1			11	5	1	1	1	6	152
5	Masayuki Ueda	16	2	1	1	5	5	7	Ret	9	3	Ret	11	2	5	139
6	"Dragon"	5	4	3	Ret	DNQ	DNQ	4	2	4	2	Ret	4	5	3	134
7	Nobuhiro Imada	3	14	11	Ret	1	DNS	Ret	1	2	Ret	4	3			110
8	Reijiro Yamazaki	6	5	DNQ	DNQ	13†	10	Ret	4	Ret	Ret	5	7	6	7	61
9	Masayoshi Oyama	12	9	9	5	10	8	Ret	7	8	7	7	10	8	8	50
10	"Kentaro"	11	7	7	14†	6	Ret	Ret	12	3	9	8	14	Ret	11	41
11	Tadakazu Kojima	10	13	16	10	8	Ret	3	Ret	10	13	6	6			38
12	Isao Nakashima	13	8	8	4	12	9	Ret	DNS	13	10	9	8	10	10	31
13	Yoshitsugu Kondo	7	6							6	6					30
14	Norio Tsukamoto			12	8	9	7	5	8	16	11					26
15	Hiroyuki Saka					7	6	Ret	6							22
16	Bunsei Okawa	14	12	6	7											14
17	Yuichi Sasaki									14	8	11	12	7	Ret	10
18	"Yugo"	DNQ	DNQ	14	11	11	11	6	10	17	Ret	15	17	12	13	9
19	Hachiro Osaka	9	Ret	15	12	14†	Ret	Ret	9	15	12	12	13	9	9	8
20	Masahiro Aoai	15	11	13	9											2
21	Shoichiro Akamatsu									12	14	14	9			2
22	Tsuyoshi Usui			DNS	DNS							10	16			1
23	"Syuji"											13	15	Ret	12	0
–	Kazuaki Yasui					DNQ	DNQ									–
Pos	Driver	R1	R2	R3	R4	R5	R6	R7	R8	R9	R10	R11	R12	R13	R14	Pts
Pos	Driver	FUJ1		SUZ1		FUJ2		SUZ2		SUG		AUT		MOT		Pts

=== Teams' standings ===
Only the best finisher scored points for their team.

Pos	Team	Points
1	TGR-DC Racing School	290
2	Honda Formula Dream Project	232
3	Bionic Jack Racing	82
4	Akiland Racing	63
5	Zap Speed	58
6	PONOS Racing	53
7	Buzz Racing	48
8	HELM Motorsports	33
9	Dr.Dry	29
10	Media Do Kageyama Racing	12
11	Skill Speed	4
