= 2026 Formula Regional Japanese Championship =

Motor racing competition

The 2026 Formula Regional Japanese Championship was a multi-event, Formula Regional open-wheel single seater motor racing championship held in Japan. The drivers competed in Formula Regional cars that conform to the FIA Formula Regional regulations for the championship. This was the seventh season of the series, promoted by New Pacific Sports Marketing Inc., and the 48th overall season of an FIA ladder series in Japan, dating back to the 1979 Japanese Formula 3 Championship.

Ryota Horachi won the Drivers' Championship title at the final race of the season, while his Ponos Racing team claimed their first Teams' Championship title at the same race. In the Masters' Class, AiWin driver Yutaka Toriba was able to defend his title.

== Teams and drivers ==
All teams and drivers competed using the Dome F111/3 Regional F3 car, powered by an Alfa Romeo engine and on Dunlop tires.

Team	No.	Driver	Status	Rounds	Ref
(Japan) Rn-sports	10	(Japan) Hibiki Komatsu		1, 4	
(Japan) Rn-sports	10	(Japan) Shunji Okumoto		2	
(Japan) Rn-sports	10	(Japan) Yu Oda		3, 5	
(Japan) Rn-sports	10	(Japan) Tosei Moriyama		6	
(Japan) Rn-sports	11	(Japan) Masayuki Ueda	M	All	
(Japan) AiWin	13	(Japan) Yutaka Toriba	M	All	
(Japan) Nilzz Racing	18	(Japan) "Yuki"	M	All	
(Japan) Nilzz Racing	77	(Japan) "Z.Falcon"	M	5–6	
(Japan) TB Hopper's	21	(Japan) "Daisuke"	M	3, 5–6	
(Japan) N-SPEED	23	(Japan) "Yugo"	M	1–2, 4–6	
(China) Sky Motorsports	36	(Hong Kong) Paul Wong	M	All	
(Japan) TOM'S TGR-DC	37	(Japan) Yuzuki Miura		All	
(Japan) TOM'S TGR-DC	38	(Japan) Masana Muto		1–4	
(Japan) TOM'S TGR-DC	38	(Japan) Tokiya Suzuki		5–6	
(Japan) Eagle Sports	40	(Japan) Shoichiro Akamatsu	M	1–3, 5	
(Japan) Abbey Racing	44	(Japan) "Akita"	M	1–4	
(Japan) Ponos Racing	45	(Japan) Ryota Horachi		All	
(Japan) Ponos Racing	54	(Japan) Kento Omiya		All	
(Japan) Fujita Yakkyoku Racing	46	(Japan) Hideaki Irie	M	All	
(Japan) Ragno Motor Sports	48	(China) Lin Chenghua		All	
(Japan) Tomei Sports	60	(Japan) "Seimei"	M	2–3, 5–6	
(Japan) Dr. Dry Racing Team	86	(Japan) Rio Shimono		All	
(Japan) Team LeMans	88	(China) Li Xuanyu		All	

Icon	Legend
M	Masters' Class

== Calendar ==
The calendar for the 2026 season was revealed on 25 December 2025. The series returned to Mobility Resort Motegi after a one-year absence, while Okayama International Circuit was not part of the schedule for the first time in series history. With four double-header and two triple-header rounds, the race count decreased to 14, one less than in 2025.

Round		Circuit	Date	Support Bill	Map of circuit locations
1	R1	Suzuka International Racing Course, Suzuka	28 February	Formula Beat Regional Championship Series; Super FJ Suzuka - Okayama; Suzuka Clubman Race; VITA Race Suzuka	2026 Formula Regional Japanese Championship is located in Japan
1	R2	Suzuka International Racing Course, Suzuka	1 March	Formula Beat Regional Championship Series; Super FJ Suzuka - Okayama; Suzuka Clubman Race; VITA Race Suzuka	2026 Formula Regional Japanese Championship is located in Japan
1	R3	Suzuka International Racing Course, Suzuka	1 March	Formula Beat Regional Championship Series; Super FJ Suzuka - Okayama; Suzuka Clubman Race; VITA Race Suzuka	2026 Formula Regional Japanese Championship is located in Japan
2	R4	Suzuka International Racing Course, Suzuka	23 May	Super Formula Championship; Super Formula Lights	2026 Formula Regional Japanese Championship is located in Japan
2	R5	Suzuka International Racing Course, Suzuka	24 May	Super Formula Championship; Super Formula Lights	2026 Formula Regional Japanese Championship is located in Japan
3	R6	Mobility Resort Motegi, Motegi	27 June	Motegi Champion Cup Race; Honda N-One Owner's Cup	2026 Formula Regional Japanese Championship is located in Japan
3	R7	Mobility Resort Motegi, Motegi	28 June	Motegi Champion Cup Race; Honda N-One Owner's Cup	2026 Formula Regional Japanese Championship is located in Japan
4	R8	Sportsland Sugo, Murata	29 August	Super Formula Lights; SUGO Champion Cup Race	2026 Formula Regional Japanese Championship is located in Japan
4	R9	Sportsland Sugo, Murata	30 August	Super Formula Lights; SUGO Champion Cup Race	2026 Formula Regional Japanese Championship is located in Japan
4	R10	Sportsland Sugo, Murata	30 August	Super Formula Lights; SUGO Champion Cup Race	2026 Formula Regional Japanese Championship is located in Japan
5	R11	Fuji Speedway, Oyama	26 September	FIA World Endurance Championship; Porsche Carrera Cup Japan	2026 Formula Regional Japanese Championship is located in Japan
5	R12	Fuji Speedway, Oyama	26 September	FIA World Endurance Championship; Porsche Carrera Cup Japan	2026 Formula Regional Japanese Championship is located in Japan
6	R13	Fuji Speedway, Oyama	10 October	Super Formula Championship; Kyojo Cup	2026 Formula Regional Japanese Championship is located in Japan
6	R14	Fuji Speedway, Oyama	11 October	Super Formula Championship; Kyojo Cup	2026 Formula Regional Japanese Championship is located in Japan

== Season report ==
=== First half ===
The 2026 Formula Regional Japanese Championship began with two race weekends at Suzuka International Racing Course. The opening race saw Rn-sports driver Hibiki Komatsu start from pole position, but the best start went to TOM'S TGR-DC driver Yuzuki Miura, who slotted into first place exiting turn one after starting third. Ponos Racing's Ryota Horachi and the other TOM's car of Masana Muto also got past Komatsu. Horachi quickly claimed second and set out after Miura, but could not get past him. He had pole position for race two, however, and was able to fend off Miura multiple times throughout the race to convert pole position into victory. Komatsu started and finished in third. Race three saw Miura start from pole position and he was able to easily hold the lead when Muto stalled on the front row. All drivers were able to avoid him, with Ponos Racing's Kento Omiya taking second ahead of Ragno Motor Sports' Lin Chenghua. Horachi spent the race rising from sixth to fourth, but with two wins to his name, Miura claimed the points lead.

Omiya took both pole positions in qualifying for the second round. He led Miura at the start of the first race as Horachi stalled from third place and dropped to the back. While positions remained static at the front, Horachi spent the race battling his way back up the order, finishing fifth in the end as Omiya took a controlled victory ahead of Miura and Muto. Race two began with Horachi getting a better start, but he still lost out to Miura on lap one before a safety car halted proceedings. Miura attacked Omiya on the restart, but ran wide and dropped to third. Now it was Horachi's turn to pressure Omiya, and on lap six he managed to get past him. Omiya dropped behind Muto and Miura as the race progressed, before eventually retiring with a technical issue. Horachi went on take victory ahead of Muto and Miura, closing in to within 11 points of the latter in the standings.

The third weekend, held at Mobility Resort Motegi, was disrupted by weather as typhoons saw qualifying cancelled, with the race grids set based on free practice times. That put Omiya on pole position for the first race ahead of Horachi and Muto. He converted that into a lights-to-flag victory as Horachi dropped to fifth at the start and spent the race battling back up the order to finish where he started ahead of Muto. The latter started race two from pole position, but immediately dropped behind Omiya and Horachi. Omiya streaked away in the lead again as Muto tried to retake second place twice. He finally succeeded after a safety car restart, but could not attack Omiya, who claimed another victory. Championship leader Miura finished the two races in fourth and fifth, which saw Horachi draw exactly level with him in the standings, both on points and on countback.

=== Second half ===
Round four at Sportsland Sugo was affected by weather once again as all sessions were held on a wet track. Dr. Dry's Rio Shimono took her maiden pole position in qualifying for the first race, and led Omiya throughout the race to take her maiden victory. Horachi moved from fifth to third at the start and remained there to complete the podium. Omiya had pole position for the second race, and profited from Horachi battling and passing Miura for second to hold on to his lead. A red flag then stopped the race, leading to a reduction in race distance and half points awarded. Omiya took victory as the top three remained static after the restart. Another pole position for Shimono in race three followed, but she dropped behind Omiya and Horachi at the start. The pair then made contact while battling and both spun, also sending Shimono into the runoff. Miura was handed the lead and won the race to claim a narrow 2.5-point championship lead over Horachi as the latter was able to battle past Ragno Motor Sport’s Lin Chenghua to finish the race in second.

Two double-header weekends at Fuji Speedway concluded the season, and the influence of wet weather continued across the first one. 2025 runner-up Tokiya Suzuki, who returned to TOM'S for the final two rounds as a replacement for the injured Muto, took both pole positions. After fending off an attack from Miura at the start of the first race, Suzuki managed to pull away and take victory. Omiya claimed third at the start and held the position until the end. Race two began under the safety car, but when it ended, Suzuki continued his domination, this time defending from Horachi initially before winning by over 33 seconds. Horachi fell behind and fought with Omiya, eventually losing out to both him and Miura as he dropped to fourth. Two podiums for Miura saw him able to extend his championship lead to 11.5 points over Horachi, with Omiya close behind in third.

Horachi and Suzuki took the pole positions for the final two races of the year. A slow start for Horachi saw Suzuki initially take the lead, before a lengthy battle unfolded. The pair swapped the lead six times across the race, with Horachi coming out on top four laps from the end. Miura rose from fourth on the grid to third place, therefore managing to hold on to the championship lead by 1.5 points. The final race saw Horachi start slow again as he dropped behind Omiya this time. The latter then began pressuring Suzuki, and eventually passed him for the lead on lap five. Horachi followed him through, with Miura also getting past briefly before Suzuki was able to reclaim third. Horachi then attacked Omiya on the final lap, but found no way past. Still, following Omiya home and taking second place was enough for him to seal the championship by 6.5 points as Miura had dropped to fifth place.

== Race results ==
Round		Circuit	Pole position	Fastest lap	Winning driver	Winning team	Masters winner
1	R1	Suzuka International Racing Course	(Japan) Hibiki Komatsu	(Japan) Ryota Horachi	(Japan) Yuzuki Miura	(Japan) TOM'S TGR-DC	(Japan) "Akita"
1	R2	Suzuka International Racing Course	(Japan) Ryota Horachi	(Japan) Yuzuki Miura	(Japan) Ryota Horachi	(Japan) Ponos Racing	(Japan) "Akita"
1	R3	Suzuka International Racing Course	(Japan) Yuzuki Miura	(Japan) Masana Muto	(Japan) Yuzuki Miura	(Japan) TOM'S TGR-DC	(Japan) "Akita"
2	R4	Suzuka International Racing Course	(Japan) Kento Omiya	(Japan) Masana Muto	(Japan) Kento Omiya	(Japan) Ponos Racing	(Japan) "Akita"
2	R5	Suzuka International Racing Course	(Japan) Kento Omiya	(Japan) Ryota Horachi	(Japan) Ryota Horachi	(Japan) Ponos Racing	(Japan) "Akita"
3	R6	Mobility Resort Motegi	(Japan) Kento Omiya (Note: Qualifying was cancelled due to adverse weather conditions. The grid for this round was based on the results of the first pre-event test session. Each drivers' best time was used for the grid of race 6, and each drivers' second-best time was used for the grid of race 7.)	(Japan) Kento Omiya	(Japan) Kento Omiya	(Japan) Ponos Racing	(Japan) Yutaka Toriba
3	R7	Mobility Resort Motegi	(Japan) Masana Muto	(Japan) Kento Omiya	(Japan) Kento Omiya	(Japan) Ponos Racing	(Japan) "Akita"
4	R8	Sportsland Sugo	(Japan) Rio Shimono	(Japan) Rio Shimono	(Japan) Rio Shimono	(Japan) Dr. Dry Racing Team	(Japan) Yutaka Toriba
4	R9	Sportsland Sugo	(Japan) Kento Omiya	(Japan) Kento Omiya	(Japan) Kento Omiya	(Japan) Ponos Racing	(Japan) Masayuki Ueda
4	R10	Sportsland Sugo	(Japan) Rio Shimono	(Japan) Kento Omiya	(Japan) Yuzuki Miura	(Japan) TOM'S TGR-DC	(Japan) Hideaki Irie
5	R11	Fuji Speedway	(Japan) Tokiya Suzuki	(Japan) Tokiya Suzuki	(Japan) Tokiya Suzuki	(Japan) TOM'S TGR-DC	(Japan) Masayuki Ueda
5	R12	Fuji Speedway	(Japan) Tokiya Suzuki	(Japan) Tokiya Suzuki	(Japan) Tokiya Suzuki	(Japan) TOM'S TGR-DC	(Japan) Masayuki Ueda
6	R13	Fuji Speedway	(Japan) Ryota Horachi	(Japan) Ryota Horachi	(Japan) Ryota Horachi	(Japan) Ponos Racing	(Japan) Yutaka Toriba
6	R14	Fuji Speedway	(Japan) Tokiya Suzuki	(Japan) Ryota Horachi	(Japan) Kento Omiya	(Japan) Ponos Racing	(Japan) Yutaka Toriba

== Championship standings ==
=== Scoring system ===
Points were awarded to the top ten classified finishers as follows:

Position	**1st**	**2nd**	**3rd**	**4th**	**5th**	**6th**	**7th**	**8th**	**9th**	**10th**
Points	25	18	15	12	10	8	6	4	2	1

=== Drivers' Championship ===
Pos	Driver	SUZ1			SUZ2		MOT		SUG			FUJ1		FUJ2		Pts
Pos	Driver	R1	R2	R3	R4	R5	R6	R7	R8	R9 (Note: Half points were awarded in the second race of round four at Sugo due to limited running caused by adverse weather conditions.)	R10	R11	R12	R13	R14	Pts
1	(Japan) Ryota Horachi	2	**1**	4	5	1	2	3	3	2	2	4	4	**1**	2	232
2	(Japan) Yuzuki Miura	1	2	**1**	2	3	5	4	4	3	1	2	3	3	5	225.5
3	(Japan) Kento Omiya	5	5	2	**1**	**Ret**	**1**	1	2	**1**	5	3	2	5	1	221.5
4	(Japan) Rio Shimono	8	8	7	7	Ret	4	5	**1**	5	**4**	6	6	4	6	120
5	(Japan) Masana Muto	3	4	5	3	2	3	**2**	7	Ret	DNS					109
6	(China) Lin Chenghua	6	6	3	4	14	6	DNS	Ret	13	3	7	7	7	7	90
7	(Japan) Tokiya Suzuki											**1**	**1**	2	**3**	83
8	(Japan) Hibiki Komatsu	**4**	3	6					5	4	6					59
9	(Japan) Yu Oda						7	6				5	5			34
10	(Japan) Yutaka Toriba	10	13	10	9	7	9	15	6	7	8	13	11	8	9	33
11	(Japan) "Akita"	9	7	9	8	5	13	7	10	Ret	DNS					31
12	(Japan) Masayuki Ueda	12	10	Ret	12	8	11	8	8	6	9	8	8	10	12	28
13	(China) Li Xuanyu	7	9	8	11	Ret	8	10	11	8	Ret	11	12	14	8	23
14	(Japan) Shunji Okumoto				6	4										20
15	(Japan) Tosei Moriyama													6	4	20
16	(Japan) Hideaki Irie	11	11	11	13	9	10	11	9	9	7	9	10	9	10	18
17	(Japan) Shoichiro Akamatsu	DNS	Ret	13	10	6	12	9				10	9			14
18	(Japan) "Yuki"	13	12	12	15	10	16	Ret	12	10	10	14	15	11	11	2.5
19	(Hong Kong) Paul Wong	15	15	DNS	14	13	15	12	13	11	11	16	16	12	Ret	0
20	(Japan) "Seimei"				16	11	17	13				17	Ret	15	14	0
21	(Japan) "Yugo"	14	14	14	17	12			14	12	12	Ret	Ret	16	15	0
22	(Japan) "Z.Falcon"											12	13	DNS	DNS	0
23	(Japan) "Daisuke"						14	14				15	14	13	13	0
Pos	Driver	R1	R2	R3	R4	R5	R6	R7	R8	R9	R10	R11	R12	R13	R14	Pts
Pos	Driver	SUZ1			SUZ2		MOT		SUG			FUJ1		FUJ2		Pts

Key
Colour	Result
Gold	Winner
Silver	Second place
Bronze	Third place
Green	Other points position
Blue	Other classified position
Blue	Not classified, finished (NC)
Purple	Not classified, retired (Ret)
Red	Did not qualify (DNQ)
Red	Did not pre-qualify (DNPQ)
Black	Disqualified (DSQ)
White	Did not start (DNS)
White	Race cancelled (C)
Blank	Did not practice (DNP)
Blank	Excluded (EX)
Blank	Did not arrive (DNA)
Blank	Withdrawn (WD)
Blank	Did not enter (cell empty)
Text formatting	Meaning
**Bold**	Pole position
Italics	Fastest lap

=== Masters' Class ===
Pos	Driver	SUZ1			SUZ2		MOT		SUG			FUJ1		FUJ2		Pts
Pos	Driver	R1	R2	R3	R4	R5	R6	R7	R8	R9	R10	R11	R12	R13	R14	Pts
1	(Japan) Yutaka Toriba	2	5	2	2	3	**1**	**8**	**1**	2	2	5	4	1	1	232
2	(Japan) Hideaki Irie	3	3	3	5	5	2	4	3	3	1	2	3	2	2	211.5
3	(Japan) Masayuki Ueda	**4**	2	**Ret**	4	4	3	2	2	**1**	**3**	1	**1**	3	**4**	209.5
4	(Japan) "Akita"	1	**1**	1	**1**	**1**	5	1	4	Ret	DNS					172
5	(Japan) "Yuki"	5	4	4	7	6	8	Ret	5	4	4	6	7	4	3	121
6	(Japan) Shoichiro Akamatsu	DNS	Ret	5	3	2	4	3				3	2			103
7	(Hong Kong) Paul Wong	7	7	DNS	6	9	7	5	6	5	5	8	8	5	Ret	79
8	(Japan) "Yugo"	6	6	6	9	8			7	6	6	Ret	Ret	8	7	58
9	(Japan) "Daisuke"						6	7				7	6	6	5	46
10	(Japan) "Seimei"				8	7	9	6				9	Ret	7	6	36
11	(Japan) "Z.Falcon"											**4**	5	**DNS**	DNS	22
Pos	Driver	R1	R2	R3	R4	R5	R6	R7	R8	R9	R10	R11	R12	R13	R14	Pts
Pos	Driver	SUZ1			SUZ2		MOT		SUG			FUJ1		FUJ2		Pts

=== Teams' Championship ===
Each team acquired the points earned by their highest finishing driver in each race.

Pos	Team	SUZ1			SUZ2		MOT		SUG			FUJ1		FUJ2		Pts
Pos	Team	R1	R2	R3	R4	R5	R6	R7	R8	R9	R10	R11	R12	R13	R14	Pts
1	(Japan) Ponos Racing	2	1	2	1	1	1	1	2	1	2	3	2	1	1	292.5
2	(Japan) TOM'S TGR-DC	1	2	1	2	2	3	2	4	3	1	1	1	2	3	264.5
3	(Japan) Rn-sports	4	3	6	6	4	7	6	5	4	6	5	5	6	4	133
4	(Japan) Dr. Dry Racing Team	8	8	7	7	Ret	4	5	1	5	4	6	6	4	6	120
5	(Japan) Ragno Motor Sports	6	6	3	4	14	6	DNS	Ret	13	3	7	7	7	7	90
6	(Japan) AiWin	10	13	10	9	7	9	15	6	7	8	13	11	8	9	33
7	(Japan) Abbey Racing	9	7	9	8	5	13	7	10	Ret	DNS					31
8	(Japan) Team LeMans	7	9	8	11	Ret	8	10	11	8	Ret	11	12	14	8	23
9	(Japan) Fujita Yakkyoku Racing	11	11	11	13	9	10	11	9	9	7	9	10	9	10	18
10	(Japan) Eagle Sports	DNS	Ret	13	10	6	12	9				10	9			14
11	(Japan) Nilzz Racing	13	12	12	15	10	16	Ret	12	10	10	12	13	11	11	2.5
12	(China) Sky Motorsports	15	15	DNS	14	13	15	12	13	11	11	16	16	12	Ret	0
13	(Japan) Tomei Sports				16	11	17	13				17	Ret	15	14	0
14	(Japan) N-SPEED	14	14	14	17	12			14	12	12	Ret	Ret	16	15	0
15	(Japan) TB Hopper's						14	14				15	14	13	13	0
Pos	Driver	R1	R2	R3	R4	R5	R6	R7	R8	R9	R10	R11	R12	R13	R14	Pts
Pos	Driver	SUZ1			SUZ2		MOT		SUG			FUJ1		FUJ2		Pts
