= TGR Driver Challenge Program =

Program to support young racing drivers through their careers

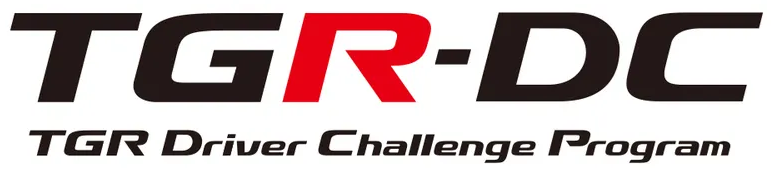
- Founded: 2001; 25 years ago (as Toyota Drivers Academy in 2003)
- Base: Cologne, Germany & Japan
- Team principal(s): Kazuki Nakajima
- Current drivers: (Japan) Rikuto Kobayashi (Japan) Miki Koyama (Japan) Yuzuki Miura (Japan) Ritomo Miyata (Japan) Masana Muto (Japan) Jin Nakamura (Finland) Kalle Rovanperä (Japan) Yuki Sano (Japan) Tokiya Suzuki (Japan) Kiyoshi Umegaki (Austria) Charlie Wurz (Austria) Oscar Wurz

The Toyota Gazoo Racing Driver Challenge Program (TGR-DC), formerly known as the Toyota Drivers Academy and Toyota Young Drivers Program (TDP), is a driver development programme by Toyota Gazoo Racing. It is meant to promote talent in different racing series by helping them with funds, hoping to find drivers who will race for the team in the future. Notable graduates of the scheme are Kazuki Nakajima, Kamui Kobayashi; who made their F1 debuts for Williams and Toyota, respectively.

The program was launched in 2001 when Toyota entered Formula 1, and wants to promote young drivers from Japan, and other countries that are able to reach F1.

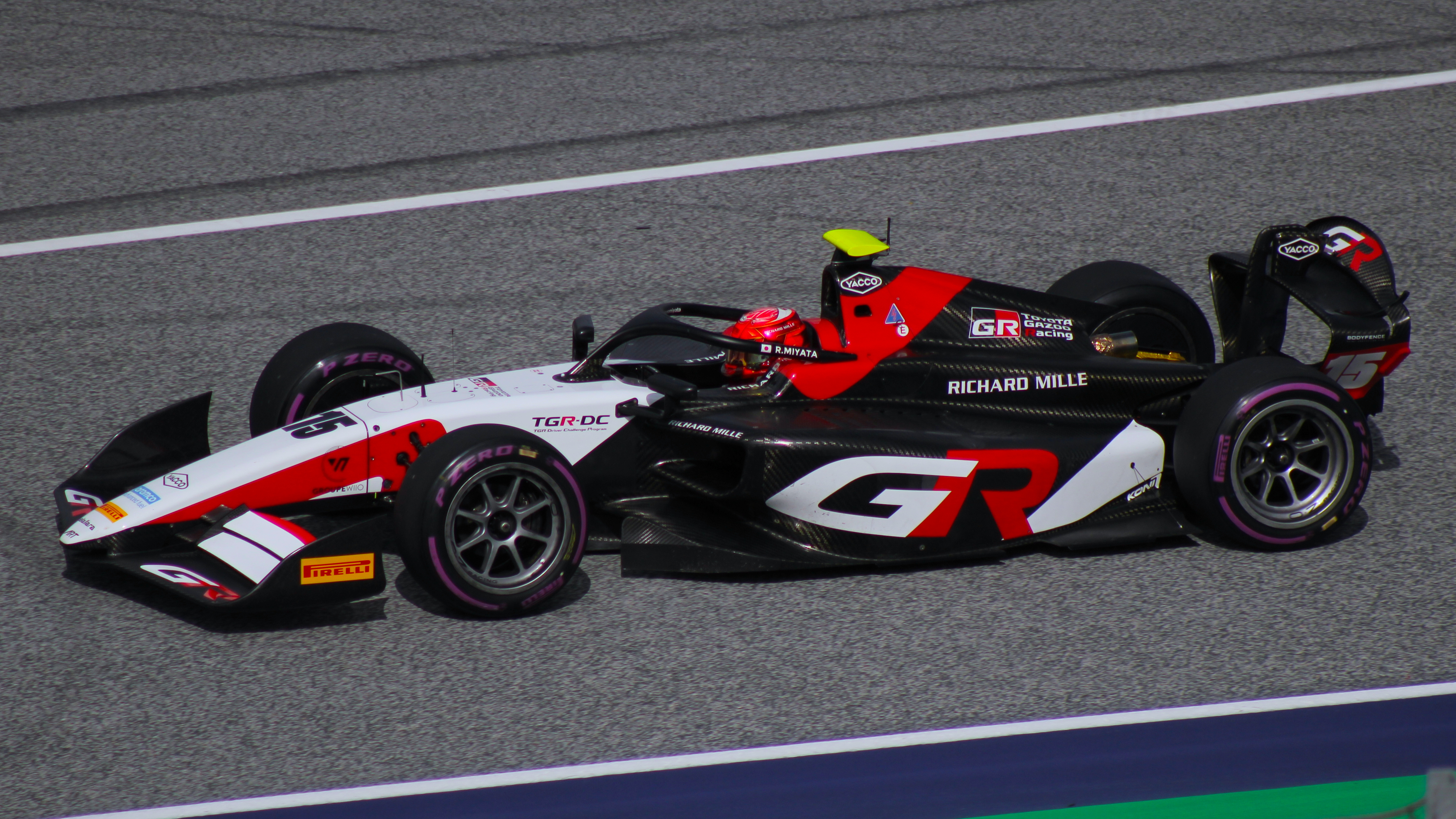
Ritomo Miyata driving for ART Grand Prix during the 2025 Formula 2 Championship

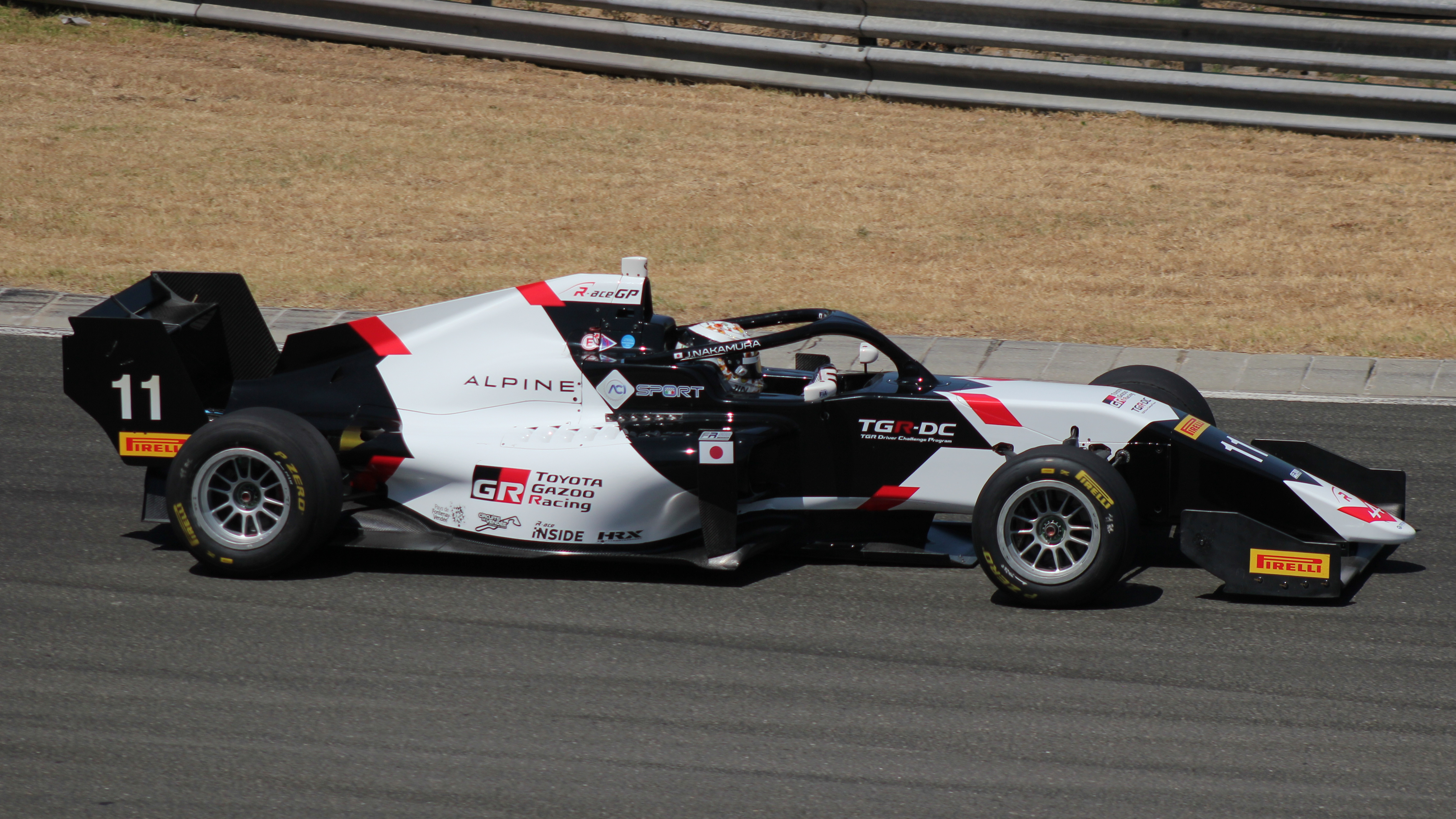
Jin Nakamura driving for R-ace GP during the 2025 Formula Regional European Championship

== Current drivers ==
=== TGR-DC drivers ===
Driver	Years	Current Series	Titles as TGR-DC driver
(Japan) Ritomo Miyata	2017–2021, 2025–	Formula 2 Championship; Super GT – GT300	**F4 Japanese Championship (2017)**; **Super Formula Lights (2020)**
(Japan) Rikuto Kobayashi	2024–	Super Formula Championship; Super GT – GT500	None
(Japan) Jin Nakamura	2024–	Formula Regional Oceania Trophy; FIA Formula 3 Championship; GB3 Championship	None
(Japan) Yuki Sano	2025–	Formula Regional Middle East Trophy; Formula Regional European Championship	None
(Japan) Tokiya Suzuki	2025–	Super Formula Lights; Super GT – GT300; Formula Regional Japanese Championship	**F4 Japanese Championship (2025)**
(Japan) Kiyoshi Umegaki	2025–	Super Formula Lights; Super GT – GT300	**Formula Regional Japanese Championship (2025)**
(Japan) Yuzuki Miura	2026–	Formula Regional Japanese Championship; Super Formula Lights; F4 Japanese Championship	None
(Japan) Masana Muto	2026–	Formula Regional Japanese Championship; F4 Japanese Championship	None
(Finland) Kalle Rovanperä	2026–	Formula Regional Oceania Trophy	None
(Austria) Charlie Wurz	2026–	Super Formula Championship; Super GT – GT300; Asian Le Mans Series	None
(Austria) Oscar Wurz	2026–	Super Formula Lights; Eurocup-3	None

- Championship titles highlighted in **bold**.

== Former drivers ==
=== TGR-DC drivers ===
Driver	Years	Series competed
(Japan) Takashi Kogure	2001	Japanese Formula 3 Championship (2001)
(Japan) Norihiko Tasaki	2001	Japanese Formula 3 Championship (2001)
(Australia) Ryan Briscoe	2001–2005	**Formula Renault 2000 Italy** (**2001**); Formula Renault 2000 Eurocup (2001); German Formula 3 Championship (2002); International Formula 3000 (2002); **Formula 3 Euro Series** (**2003**); IndyCar Series (2005)
(Japan) Katsuyuki Hiranaka	2001–2005	Japanese Formula 3 Championship (2002); Formula 3 Euro Series (2003–2004); Formula Nippon (2005); Super GT – GT300 (2005)
(Japan) Tatsuya Kataoka	2001–2006	Japanese Formula 3 Championship (2002–2003); Formula Nippon (2004–2006); All Japan Grand Touring Car Championship – GT300 (2003, 2009–2010); Super GT – GT500 (2005–2006, 2011)
(France) Franck Perera	2001–2006	**Formula Renault 2000 Italia** (2002–**2003**); Formula Renault 2000 Eurocup (2002); Formula 3 Euro Series (2004–2005); GP2 Series (2006)
(Sweden) Alexander Storckenfeldt	2002	Formula Renault 2000 Eurocup (2002)
(Japan) Hiroki Yoshimoto	2002–2003	Japanese Formula 3 Championship (2002–2003)
(Japan) Naoki Yokomizo	2002–2004	Japanese Formula 3 Championship (2002–2004)
(Japan) Taku Bamba	2002–2005	Japanese Formula 3 Championship (2003–2005)
(Japan) Wataru Kobayakawa	2002–2004	**Formula Toyota** (**2002**); Japanese Formula 3 Championship (2003–2004)
(Japan) Kohei Hirate	2002–2011	Formula Renault 2000 Italia (2003); Formula Renault 2000 Masters (2003); Formula 3 Euro Series (2004–2006); GP2 Series (2007); Formula Nippon (2008–2011); Super GT – GT300 (2008); Super GT – GT500 (2009–2011)
(Brazil) Roberto Streit	2003–2004	Formula Renault 2000 Italia (2003); Formula 3 Euro Series (2004)
(Japan) Kamui Kobayashi	2003–2011	Formula Renault 2000 Italia (2004); **Formula Renault Eurocup** (**2005**); **Formula Renault 2.0 Italia** (**2005**); F3 Euro Series (2006–2007); **GP2 Asia Series** (2008, **2008–09**); GP2 Series (2008–2009); Formula One (2009–2011)
(Japan) Kazuki Nakajima	2003–2011	Japanese Formula 3 Championship (2004); JGTC – GT300 (2004); F3 Euro Series (2005–2006); GP2 Series (2007); Formula One (2007–2009); Formula Nippon (2010–2011)
(United Kingdom) Ben Clucas	2004	Formula Renault 2000 Italia (2004)
(Japan) Daisuke Ikeda	2004–2005	Japanese Formula 3 Championship (2004–2005)
(Japan) Yuhi Sekiguchi	2004–2005, 2007	Formula Toyota (2004–2005); Japanese Formula 3 Championship (2007)
(Japan) Kazuya Oshima	2004–2011	Formula Toyota (2005); **Japanese Formula 3 Championship** (2006–**2007**); **Super GT – GT300** (**2007**); Formula 3 Euro Series (2008); Formula Nippon (2009–2011); Super GT – GT500 (2009–2011)
(Japan) Hideto Yasuoka	2005–2006	Japanese Formula 3 Championship (2005-2006)
(Japan) Hideki Yamauchi	2005, 2008	Formula Toyota (2005); Japanese Formula 3 Championship (2008)
(Japan) Tsubasa Abe	2006	Japanese Formula 3 Championship (2006)
(Japan) Yoshifumi Kubota	2006	Formula Challenge Japan (2006)
(Japan) Sadaomi Masuda	2006	Formula Challenge Japan (2006)
(United Kingdom) Martin Plowman	2006–2007	Eurocup Formula Renault 2.0 (2006–2007); Formula Renault 2.0 Italia (2006–2007)
(Netherlands) Henkie Waldschmidt	2006–2008	Eurocup Formula Renault 2.0 (2006–2007); Formula Renault 2.0 Italia (2006–2007); Formula 3 Euro Series (2008)
(Japan) Keisuke Kunimoto	2006–2009	Formula Toyota (2006–2007); Formula Challenge Japan (2006–2007); Japanese Formula 3 Championship (2008–2009); Super GT – GT300 (2008); **Macau Grand Prix** (**2008**); Formula Nippon (2009)
(Japan) Takuto Iguchi	2006–2011	Formula Toyota (2006–2007); Formula Challenge Japan (2006–2007); Japanese Formula 3 Championship (2008–2009); Super GT – GT300 (2008–2010); Super GT – GT350 (2011)
(Japan) Takamitsu Matsui	2007	Formula Toyota (2007); Formula Challenge Japan (2007)
(Italy) Andrea Caldarelli	2007–2008	Eurocup Formula Renault 2.0 (2007–2008); Formula Renault 2.0 WEC (2008); Formula 3 Euro Series (2008)
(Japan) Hiroaki Ishiura	2007–2011	Japanese Formula 3 Championship (2007–2009); **Super GT – GT300** (**2007**); Super GT – GT500 (2008–2011); Formula Nippon (2009–2011)
(Italy) Kei Cozzolino	2008	Japanese Formula 3 Championship (2008)
(Japan) Yuji Kunimoto	2008–2013	**Formula Challenge Japan** (**2008**); **Japanese Formula 3 Championship** (2009–**2010**); Super GT – GT300 (2009–2011); Formula Nippon (2011–2012); Super GT – GT500 (2012–2013); Super Formula Championship (2013)
(Japan) Naoya Gamou	2008, 2010–2011	Formula Challenge Japan (2008); Japanese Formula 3 Championship (2010–2011)
(Japan) Yuichi Nakayama	2008, 2011–2016	Formula Challenge Japan (2008); **Japanese Formula 3 Championship** (2011–**2013**); Super GT – GT300 (2013–2016); Super Formula Championship (2014–2016)
(Japan) Takamoto Katsuta	2012–2014	Japanese Formula 3 Championship (2012–2014)
(Japan) Ryo Hirakawa	2013–2017	Super Formula Championship (2013–2015); **Super GT – GT500** (2014–**2017**); European Le Mans Series - LMP2 (2016–2017)
(Japan) Kenta Yamashita	2014–2020	**Japanese Formula 3 Championship** (2014–**2016**); Super GT – GT300 (2015–2017); **Super GT – GT500** (2018–**2019**); Super Formula Championship (2017–2020); FIA World Endurance Championship (2019–20)
(Japan) Sho Tsuboi	2016–2020	**Japanese Formula 3 Championship** (2016–**2018**); Super GT – GT300 (2017–2018); Super GT – GT500 (2019–2020); Super Formula Championship (2019–2020)
(Japan) Kazuto Kotaka	2019–2025	Toyota Racing Series (2019); Japanese Formula 3 Championship (2019); Super GT – GT300 (2019–2024); **Super Formula Lights** (2020, **2022**); Super Formula Championship (2021, 2023–2025); GT World Challenge Asia (2025); GT World Challenge Europe Endurance Cup (2025); Super GT – GT500 (2025)
(Japan) Hibiki Taira	2021–2025	Super Formula Lights (2021–2023); Super GT – GT300 (2021–2025); Super Formula Championship (2021, 2024–2025); Super GT – GT300
(Japan) Seita Nonaka	2022–2025	Super Formula Lights (2022–2025); Super GT – GT300 (2022–2025); GT World Challenge Asia (2023); **SRO Japan Cup – GT4** (2024–**2025**)
(France) Esteban Masson	2025	Super Formula Lights (2025); **European Le Mans Series – LMP2** (**2025**); FIA World Endurance Championship – LMGT3 (2025)

- Championship titles highlighted in **bold**.

== TGR-DC Racing School drivers ==
The TGR-DC Racing School is a team for young Toyota drivers who compete in F4 Japanese Championship.

Driver	Years in F4 Japan
(Japan) Hibiki Taira	**2020**
(Japan) Seita Nonaka	2020–**2021**
(Japan) Jiei Okuzumi	2020–2021
(Japan) Eijiro Shimizu	2020–2021
(Japan) Rin Arakawa	2021–2022
(Japan) Rikuto Kobayashi	2022–**2023**
(Japan) Jin Nakamura	2022–2023
(Japan) Ryoma Henzan	2022
(Japan) Shunji Okumoto	2023
(Japan) Yuki Sano	2023–2024
(Japan) Kazuhisa Urabe	2024
(Japan) Tokiya Suzuki	2024–**2025**
(Japan) Kiyoshi Umegaki	2024–2025
(Japan) Yuzuki Miura	2025–2026
(Japan) Masana Muto	2025–2026
(Japan) Takahiro Kikuchi	2025
(Japan) Megumu Suzuki	2025
(Japan) Masaki Hamabe	2026
(Japan) Buntaro Igarashi	2026
(Japan) Ryo Sakai	2026
(Japan) Tomoki Terashima	2026

- Championship title highlighted in **bold**.
- Promoted to TGR-DC drivers highlighted in italic.

== See also ==
- Toyota Gazoo Racing WEC
