= Ryota Horachi =

Japanese racing driver

- Nationality: (Japan) Japanese
- Born: 6 November 2006 (age 20) Aichi, Japan

Super GT - GT300 career
- Debut season: Tsuchiya Engineering
- Car number: 25

Previous series
- 2022-2025: F4 Japanese Championship

Ryota Horachi (洞地 遼大, Horachi Ryota; born 6 November 2006) is a Japanese racing driver who last competed in the Formula Regional Japanese Championship, winning the title.

== Career ==
=== Formula 4 ===
Horachi started his Formula 4 career in 2022 with Akiland Racing. He moved to HFDP with B-Max Racing Team after winning the Honda Suzuka Scholarship, partnering Yuto Nomura for the 2024 season. Horachi achieved his first win at Fuji Speedway.

Horachi stayed again in Formula 4 for 2025, but this time racing with PONOS Racing.

=== Super GT ===
In 2026, Horachi was recruited by Tsuchiya Engineering to compete in Super GT GT300 class with longtime driver Takamitsu Matsui.

== Racing record ==
=== Career summary ===
Season	Series	Team	Races	Wins	Poles	FLaps	Podiums	Points	Position
2022	F4 Japanese Championship	Akiland Racing	6	0	0	0	0	0	24th
2023	F4 Japanese Championship	Akiland Racing	14	0	0	1	0	56	10th
2024	F4 Japanese Championship	HFDP wth B-Max Racing Team	13	1	6	4	8	167	**2nd**
2025	F4 Japanese Championship	Ponos Racing	14	0	0	0	1	98	5th
2026	Formula Regional Japanese Championship	Ponos Racing	14	3	2	4	10	232	**1st**
2026	Super GT – GT300	Hoppy Team Tsuchiya	8	0	0	0	0	3	41st

=== Complete F4 Japanese Championship results ===
Year	Team	1	2	3	4	5	6	7	8	9	10	11	12	13	14	DC	Points
2022	Akiland Racing	FUJ1; 1	FUJ1; 2	SUZ1; 1	SUZ1; 2	FUJ2; 1; 20	FUJ2; 2; 18	SUZ2; 1; 13	SUZ2; 2; 29	SUG; 1	SUG; 2	AUT; 1	AUT; 2	MOT; 1; 13	MOT; 2; 32†	24th	0
2023	Akiland Racing	FUJ1; 2; 6	FUJ1; 1; 13	SUZ1; 1; 9	SUZ1; 2; 8	FUJ2; 1; 15	FUJ2; 2; 37	SUZ2; 1; 4	SUZ2; 2; 4	SUG; 1; 11	SUG; 2; 10	AUT; 1; 8	AUT; 2; 4	MOT; 1 Ret	MOT; 2; 10	10th	56
2024	HFDP with B-Max Racing Team	FUJ1; 2; 3	FUJ1; 1 DNS	SUZ1; 1; 2	SUZ1; 2; 3	**FUJ2**; **1**; 1	**FUJ2**; **2**; 2	SUG; 1; 8	SUG; 2; 5	AUT; 1; 4	**MOT**; **1**; 2	**MOT**; **2**; 3	MOT; 3; 4	**SUZ2**; **1**; 3	**SUZ2**; **2** DSQ	2nd	167
2025	Ponos Racing	FUJ1; 1; 5	FUJ1; 2; 5	FUJ1; 3; 24	FUJ2; 1; 7	FUJ2; 2; 4	SUZ; 1; 4	SUZ; 2; 4	SUG; 1; 14	SUG; 2; 12	SUG; 3 Ret	AUT; 1; 7	AUT; 2; 6	MOT; 1; 3	MOT; 2; 5	5th	98

=== Complete Formula Regional Japanese Championship results ===
(key) (Races in bold indicate pole position) (Races in italics indicate fastest lap)

Year	Entrant	1	2	3	4	5	6	7	8	9	10	11	12	13	14	Pos	Points
2026	Ponos Racing	SUZ1; 1; 2	**SUZ1**; **2**; 1	SUZ1; 3; 4	SUZ2; 1; 5	SUZ2; 2; 1	MOT; 1; 2	MOT; 2; 3	SUG; 1; 3	SUG; 2; 2	SUG; 3; 2	FUJ1; 1; 4	FUJ1; 2; 4	**FUJ2**; **1**; 1	FUJ2; 2; 2	1st	232

=== Complete Super GT results ===
Year	Team	Car	Class	1	2	3	4	5	6	7	8	DC	Points
2026	Hoppy Team Tsuchiya	Toyota GR Supra GT300	GT300	OKA; 27	FUJ; 17	FUJ; 20	SUZ; 16	SUG; 14	AUT; 15	MOT; 18	MOT; 22	41st	3
