= Ryoma Henzan =

Japanese racing driver (born 2004)

- Nationality: (Japan) Japanese
- Born: 17 July 2004 (age 22) Naha, Okinawa Prefecture, Japan

Championship titles
- 2023: Porsche Sprint Challenge Japan – GT4

Ryoma Henzan (平安山 良馬, Henzan Ryōma; born 17 July 2004 in Naha) is a Japanese racing driver. He is the 2023 Porsche Sprint Challenge Japan – GT4 champion.

== Career ==
Henzan began his karting career in 2014, competing in the Rotax Max Series Okinawa and finishing runner-up in the standings. Racing in karts until 2021, Henzan most notably won the Kart Race in Suzuka series twice in both 2018 and 2019 in the Parilla X30 class.

In 2022 Henzan stepped up to single-seaters, joining TGR-DC Racing School to compete in the F4 Japanese Championship. Taking points on debut at Fuji by finishing sixth in race one, Henzan finished 19th in race two before retiring in race one and finishing ninth in race two at the following round at Suzuka. After being out of the points in the following three rounds, Henzan finished ninth in race two at Autopolis before ending the season with an eighth place finish at Motegi en route to 14th in points.

The following year, Henzan became a Porsche Japan junior alongside Takumi Sato, making his debut in the Porsche Sprint Challenge Japan and returning to the F4 Japanese Championship, albeit with ATeam Buzz Racing. In the former, Henzan won all eight races of the season to clinch the GT4 title with the maximum possible amount of points. In the latter, Henzan took his first points of the season sixth time out at Fuji by finishing sixth in race two. Henzan then finished seventh in both races at Suzuka, before finishing eighth and ninth in the second races at both Sportsland Sugo and Autopolis. In the final round of the season at Motegi, Henzan scored his best ever result in the series by taking fourth in both races, as he closed out the season 12th in points.

In 2024, Henzan was retained by Porsche Japan as its junior as he competed in both Porsche Carrera Cup Japan and the ST-Z class of the Super Taikyu Series. In the former, he took his only win of the season at the finale at Sportsland Sugo and finished runner-up to Reimei Ito in points. In the latter, Henzan took his maiden ST-Z win at the penultimate round of the season at Okayama and helped the team finish third in the standings.

In 2025, Henzan joined Porsche Team Ebi to continue his Super Taikyu campaign in the ST-Z class. Henzan scored his first podium by finishing third at Suzuka, before following it up with a third-place finish at the Fuji 24 Hours and a second-place finish at the season-ending race at Fuji to end the year fifth in class. During 2025, Henzan also joined Brand New Racing to race in select rounds of the Superrace Championship. In the third round of the season at Inje Speedium, Henzan scored his maiden series podium by finishing third in the first night race of the season.

The following year, Henzan moved to O-NE Racing to continue in the Super 6000 class of the Superrace Championship. During 2026, Henzan also remained in ST-Z competition, as he switched to Kokusai Group Sports Team for to continue in Super Taikyu.

== Karting record ==
=== Karting career summary ===
Season	Series	Team	Position
2017	All-Japan Karting Championship – FP-Jr		6th
2018	Kart Race in Suzuka – Parilla X30	Team Ematy	1st
2018	All-Japan Karting Championship – FS-125		29th
2018	All-Japan Karting Championship East Region – FS-125		16th
2019	Kart Race in Suzuka – X30	Team Ematy	1st
2019	All-Japan Karting Championship – Parilla FS-125		7th
2019	All-Japan Karting Championship East Region – FS-125		6th
2019	IAME Series Asia – Junior	Stratos G51	10th
2020	All-Japan Karting Championship – OK		4th
2021	All-Japan Karting Championship – OK		6th

== Racing record ==
=== Racing career summary ===
Season	Series	Team	Races	Wins	Poles	F/Laps	Podiums	Points	Position
2022	F4 Japanese Championship	TGR-DC Racing School	14	0	0	0	0	16	14th
2023	F4 Japanese Championship	ATeam Buzz Racing	14	0	0	0	0	48	12th
2023	Porsche Sprint Challenge Japan – GT4	Porsche Japan	8	8	8	8	8	160	**1st**
2023	Super Taikyu – ST-Z	Techno First	1	0	0	0	0	99‡	**3rd‡**
2024	Porsche Carrera Cup Japan	Porsche Japan	13	1	0	2	7	176	**2nd**
2024	Super Taikyu – ST-Z	Techno First	7	1	0	1	4	81.5‡	**3rd‡**
2025	Super Taikyu – ST-Z	Porsche Team EBI	6	0	0	0	3	76.5‡	5th‡
2025	Superrace Championship – Super 6000	Brand New Racing	5	0	0	0	1	18	14th
2026	Superrace Championship – Super 6000	O-NE Racing							
2026	Super Taikyu – ST-Z	Kokusai Group Sports Team						‡	‡

=== Complete F4 Japanese Championship results ===
(key) (Races in bold indicate pole position) (Races in italics indicate fastest lap)

Year	Team	1	2	3	4	5	6	7	8	9	10	11	12	13	14	DC	Points
2022	TGR-DC Racing School	FUJ1; 1; 6	FUJ1; 2; 19	SUZ1; 1 Ret	SUZ1; 2; 9	FUJ2; 1; 13	FUJ2; 2; 16	SUZ2; 1; 14	SUZ2; 2; 16	SUG; 1; 13	SUG; 2; 14	AUT; 1; 12	AUT; 2; 9	MOT; 1; 35†	MOT; 2; 8	14th	16
2023	ATeam Buzz Racing	FUJ1; 1 Ret	FUJ1; 2 Ret	SUZ; 1; 11	SUZ; 2; 15	FUJ2; 1 Ret	FUJ2; 2; 7	SUZ2; 1; 7	SUZ2; 2; 7	SUG; 1 Ret	SUG; 2; 8	AUT; 1; 14	AUT; 2; 9	MOT; 1; 4	MOT; 2; 4	12th	48
