= Jin Nakamura =

Japanese racing driver (born 2006)

- 中村 仁
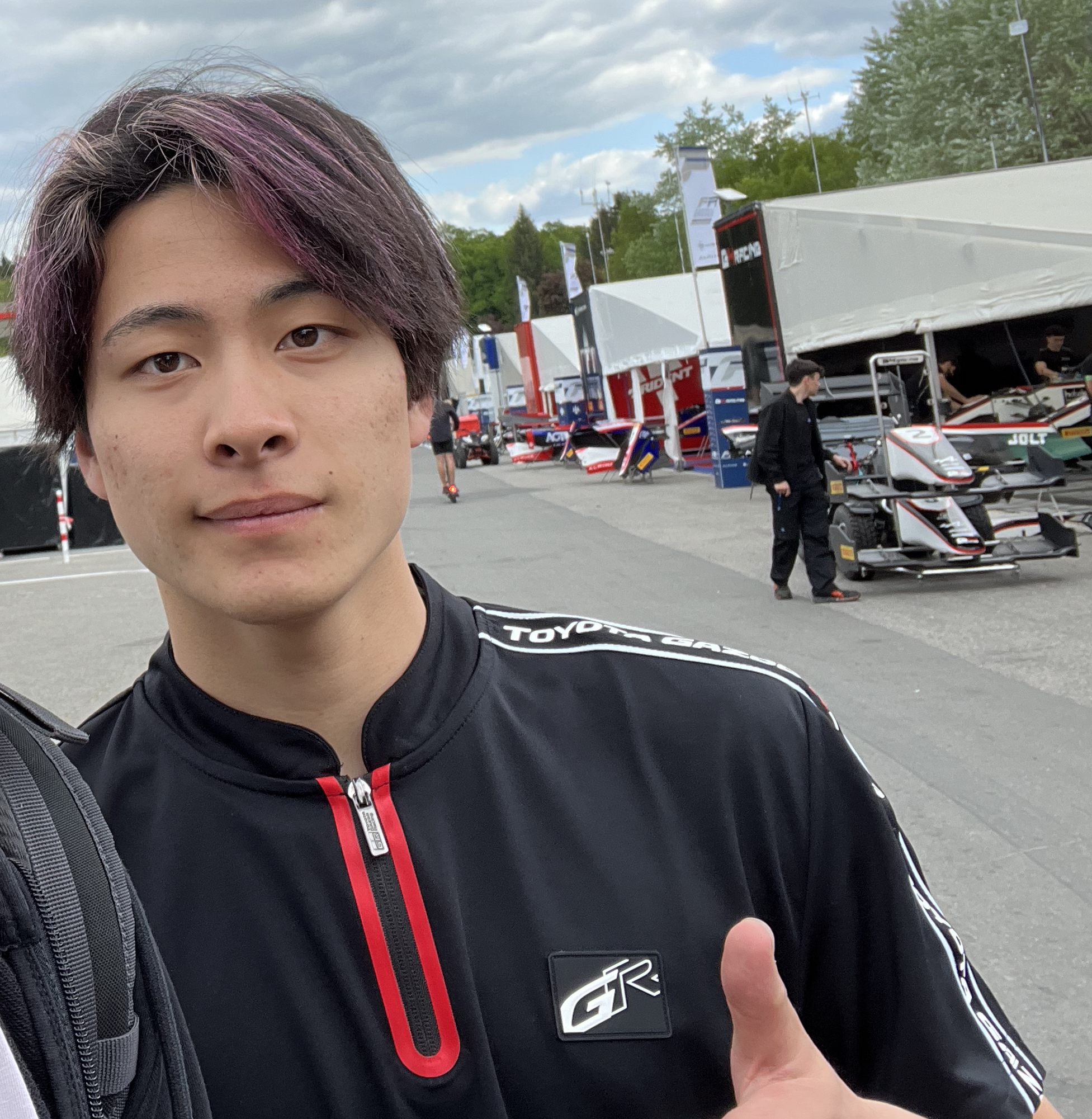
- Nakamura in 2025
- Born: 1 February 2006 (age 20); Chiba, Japan
- Nationality: (Japan) Japanese

FIA Formula 3 Championship career
- Debut season: 2026
- Current team: Hitech
- Car number: 25
- Starts: 19
- Wins: 1
- Podiums: 2
- Poles: 0
- Fastest laps: 0
- Best finish: 14th in 2026
- Statistics up to date as of 15 September 2026.

Previous series
- 2026; 2026; 2025; 2025; 2025; 2024; 2024; 2024; 2022–2023: GB3; FR Oceania; Le Mans Cup; FR European; FR Middle East; Super GT – GT300; Super Taikyu – ST-2; Super Formula Lights; F4 Japanese

Jin Nakamura (Japanese: 中村 仁, Hepburn: Nakamura Jin; born 1 February 2006) is a Japanese racing driver who last competed in the FIA Formula 3 Championship for Hitech as part of the TGR Driver Challenge Program.

Nakamura was runner-up to Rikuto Kobayashi in the 2023 F4 Japanese Championship and previously contested Super GT, Super Taikyu, and Super Formula Lights in 2024. He moved to the Formula Regional European Championship in 2025, taking one podium.

== Career ==
=== Formula 4 ===
Nakamura made his formula debut in 2022 F4 Japanese Championship with TGR-DC Racing School. He did on to win a race and have two podiums. Nakamura remained the series for 2023, where he claimed runners up behind of the eventual champion Rikuto Kobayashi & ahead of Honda's Yusuke Mitsui. He racked up couple of wins and podiums. Both Nakamura and Kobayashi took part in WEC Challenge Program training session for young drivers that was announced for the 2023 Le Mans 24 Hours. Both participated and experienced firsthand how WEC drivers and engineers take on the challenge of Le Mans.

=== Super Formula Lights ===
Nakamura stepped up to Super Formula Lights with TOM'S. Nakamura ended in fourth place in his first season.

=== Super GT ===
In 2024, Nakamura made his debut in Super GT - GT300 with apr, as he replaced Koki Saga to partner Kazuto Kotaka and Yuki Nemoto.

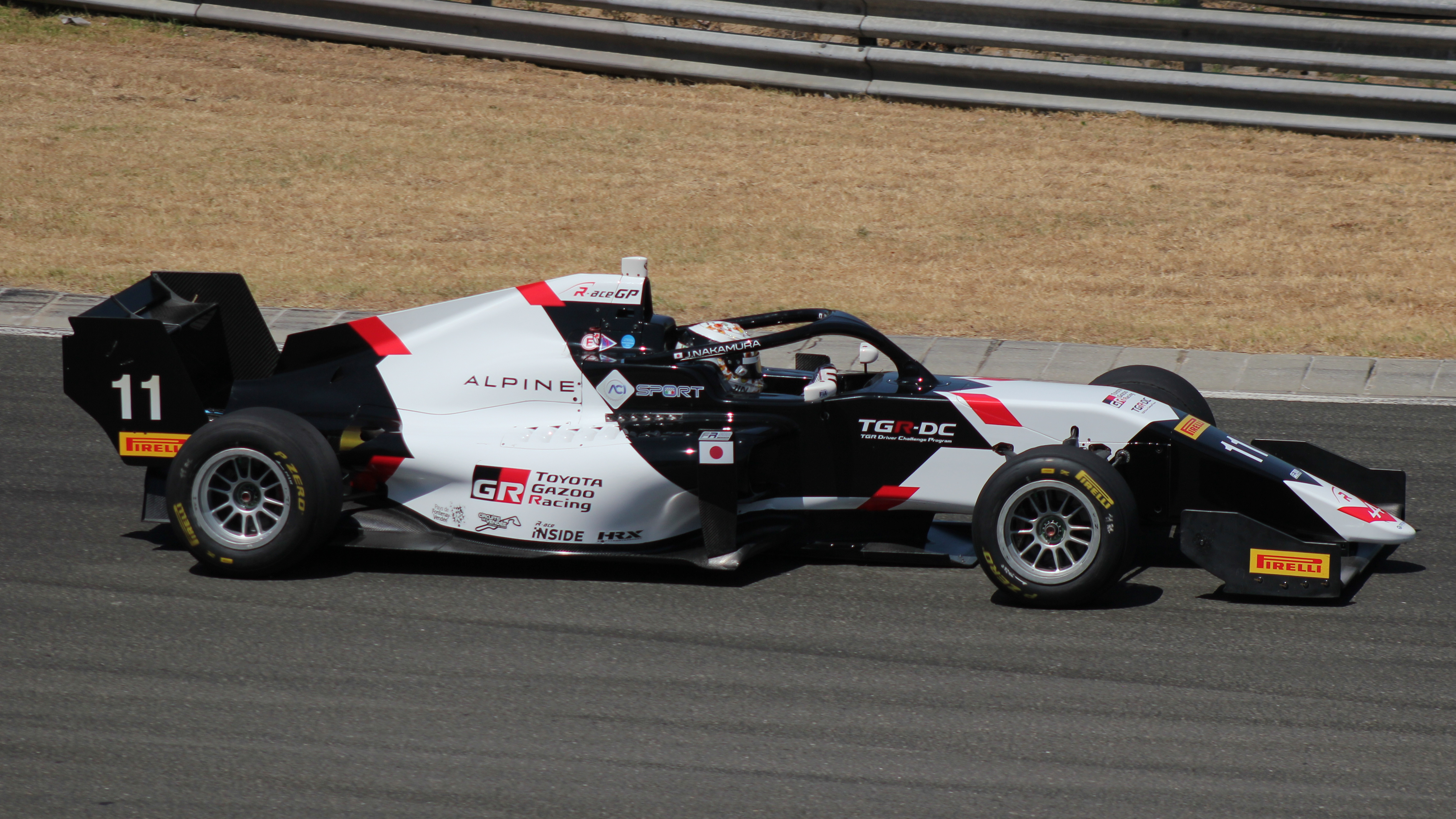
Nakamura driving at the Hungaroring during the 2025 Formula Regional European Championship

=== Formula Regional ===
==== 2025 ====
Nakamura made his Formula Regional race in 2024 Macau Grand Prix with TOM'S. Nakamura then moved abroad to race in Formula Regional European Championship and Formula Regional Middle East Championship with R-ace GP.

==== 2026 ====
Alongside his main Formula 3 campaign, Nakamura also signed on to compete in the six non-clashing GB3 Championship rounds with Hitech. After entering only Silverstone, where he won the reverse-grid race, and Spa-Francorchamps, Nakamura stepped down from the series to focus on F3.

=== FIA Formula 3 ===
In 2026, Nakamura moved up to Formula 3 with Hitech.

== Racing record ==
=== Racing career summary ===
Season	Series	Team	Races	Wins	Poles	FLaps	Podiums	Points	Position
2022	F4 Japanese Championship	TGR-DC Racing School	14	1	1	1	2	126	4th
2023	F4 Japanese Championship	TGR-DC Racing School	14	3	1	1	9	209	**2nd**
2024	Super Formula Lights	TOM'S	18	1	2	2	8	71	4th
2024	Super GT – GT300	apr	8	0	1	2	1	39	6th
2024	Super Taikyu – ST-2	KTMS	3	2	1	0	2	118	**1st‡**
2024	Macau Grand Prix	TOM'S Formula	1	0	0	0	0	—N/a	DNF
2025	Formula Regional Middle East Championship	R-ace GP	15	1	0	0	2	94	10th
2025	Formula Regional European Championship	R-ace GP	20	0	0	3	1	81	10th
2025	Le Mans Cup - LMP3	R-ace GP	2	0	0	0	0	0	26th
2025	Macau Grand Prix	R-ace GP	1	0	0	0	0	—N/a	19th
2026	Formula Regional Oceania Trophy	Hitech	15	0	2	1	6	293	4th
2026	FIA Formula 3 Championship	Hitech	19	1	0	0	2	53	14th
2026	GB3 Championship	Hitech	5	1	0	1	2	96	19th

‡ Team standings.
^{*} Season still in progress.

=== Complete F4 Japanese Championship results ===
(key) (Races in bold indicate pole position) (Races in italics indicate fastest lap)

Year	Entrant	1	2	3	4	5	6	7	8	9	10	11	12	13	14	Pos	Points
2022	TGR-DC Racing School	FUJ1; 1; 10	FUJ1; 2; 6	**SUZ1**; **1**; 8	SUZ1; 2; 7	FUJ2; 1; 6	FUJ2; 2; 9	SUZ2; 1; 7	SUZ2; 2; 4	SUG; 1; 2	**SUG**; **2**; 1	AUT; 1; 4	AUT; 2; 6	MOT; 1; 7	MOT; 2; 5	4th	126
2023	TGR-DC Racing School	FUJ1; 2 Ret	FUJ1; 1; 1	**SUZ1**; **1** Ret	SUZ1; 2; 6	FUJ2; 1; 3	FUJ2; 2; 2	SUZ2; 1; 2	SUZ2; 2; 3	SUG; 1; 4	SUG; 2; 4	AUT; 1; 2	**AUT**; **2**; 1	MOT; 1; 1	MOT; 2; 2	2nd	209

=== Complete Super GT results ===
(key) (Races in bold indicate pole position) (Races in italics indicate fastest lap)

Year	Entrant	Car	Class	1	2	3	4	5	6	7	8	Pos	Points
2024	apr	Lexus LC 500h GT	GT300	OKA; 5	FUJ; 5	SUZ; 4	FUJ; 12	SUG; 6	AUT; 14	**MOT**; 11^{1}	SUZ; 3	6th	39

=== Complete Super Formula Lights results ===
(key) (Races in bold indicate pole position) (Races in italics indicate fastest lap)

Year	Entrant	1	2	3	4	5	6	7	8	9	10	11	12	13	14	15	16	17	18	Pos	Points
2024	TOM'S	AUT; 1 Ret	AUT; 2; 2	AUT; 3; 6	SUG; 1; 2	SUG; 2; 1	SUG; 3; 3	**FUJ**; **1**; 5	FUJ; 2; 2	FUJ; 3; 7	OKA; 1; 5	OKA; 2; 4	OKA; 3; 6	SUZ; 1; 4	**SUZ**; **2**; 2	SUZ; 3; 3	MOT; 1; 5	MOT; 2; 3	MOT; 3; 5	4th	71

=== Complete Macau Grand Prix results ===
Year	Team	Car	Qualifying	Quali Race	Main Race
2024	(Japan) TOM'S Formula	Tatuus F3 T-318	13th	13th	DNF
2025	(France) R-ace GP	Tatuus F3 T-318	14th	14th	19th

=== Complete Formula Regional Middle East Championship results ===
(key) (Races in bold indicate pole position) (Races in italics indicate fastest lap)

Year	Entrant	1	2	3	4	5	6	7	8	9	10	11	12	13	14	15	Pos	Points
2025	R-ace GP	YMC1; 1; 12	YMC1; 2; 9	YMC1; 3; 8	YMC2; 1; 6	YMC2; 2; 8	YMC2; 3; 8	DUB; 1; 10	DUB; 2; 1	DUB; 3; 12	YMC3; 1; 14	YMC3; 2; 10	YMC3; 3; 10	LUS; 1; 3	LUS; 2; 21	LUS; 3; 10	10th	94

=== Complete Formula Regional European Championship results ===
(key) (Races in bold indicate pole position) (Races in italics indicate fastest lap)

Year	Entrant	1	2	3	4	5	6	7	8	9	10	11	12	13	14	15	16	17	18	19	20	Pos	Points
2025	R-ace GP	MIS; 1 Ret	MIS; 2; 10	SPA; 1; 16	SPA; 2; 7	ZAN; 1; 13	ZAN; 2; 5	HUN; 1; 13	HUN; 2; 25	LEC; 1; 8	LEC; 2; 5	IMO; 1; 25	IMO; 2 Ret	RBR; 1; 8	RBR; 2; 3	CAT; 1; 4	CAT; 2; 9	HOC; 1; 7	HOC; 2; 10	MNZ; 1 Ret	MNZ; 2; 6	10th	81

=== Complete Le Mans Cup results ===
(key) (Races in bold indicate pole position; results in italics indicate fastest lap)

Year	Entrant	Class	Chassis	1	2	3	4	5	6	7	Pos	Points
2025	R-ace GP	LMP3	Duqueine D09	CAT	LEC	LMS; 1; 15	LMS; 2 Ret	SPA	SIL	ALG	26th	0

=== Complete Formula Regional Oceania Trophy results ===
(key) (Races in bold indicate pole position) (Races in italics indicate fastest lap)

Year	Entrant	1	2	3	4	5	6	7	8	9	10	11	12	13	14	15	16	Pos	Points
2026	Hitech	HMP; 1; 5	HMP; 2; 2	HMP; 3; 4	HMP; 4; 2	TAU; 1; 9	TAU; 2; 14	TAU; 3; 6	TAU; 4; 5	TER; 1; 2	TER; 2 Ret	TER; 3 C	TER; 4; 3	HIG; 1; 10	**HIG**; **2**; 2	HIG; 3; 8	**HIG**; **4**; 2	4th	293

=== Complete FIA Formula 3 Championship results ===
(key) (Races in bold indicate pole position; races in italics indicate points for the fastest lap of the top-10 finishers)

Year	Entrant	1	2	3	4	5	6	7	8	9	10	11	12	13	14	15	16	17	18	19	Pos	Points
2026	Hitech	MEL; SPR; 13	MEL; FEA; 9	MON; SPR; 7	MON; FEA; 23	CAT; SPR; 18	CAT; FEA; 22	RBR; SPR; 3	RBR; FEA; 5	SIL; SPR; 13	SIL; FEA; 15	SPA; SPR; 1	SPA; FEA; 8	HUN; SPR; Ret	HUN; FEA; Ret	MNZ; SPR; 12	MNZ; FEA; 20	MAD; SPR; 7	MAD; FEA1; 5	MAD; FEA2; 15	14th	53

=== Complete GB3 Championship results ===
(key) (Races in bold indicate pole position; races in italics indicate fastest lap; ^{superscript} indicates points for positions gained)

Year	Entrant	1	2	3	4	5	6	7	8	9	10	11	12	13	14	15	16	17	18	19	20	21	22	23	24	Pos	Points
2026	Hitech	SIL1; 1; 8	SIL1; 2; 3	SIL1; 3; 1^{3}	SPA; 1; 4	SPA; 2; 7	SPA; 3 C	HUN; 1	HUN; 2	HUN; 3	RBR; 1	RBR; 2	RBR; 3	SIL2; 1	SIL2; 2	SIL2; 3	DON; 1	DON; 2	DON; 3	BRH; 1	BRH; 2	BRH; 3	CAT; 1	CAT; 2	CAT; 3	19th	96
