= Rikuto Kobayashi =

Japanese racing driver (born 2005)

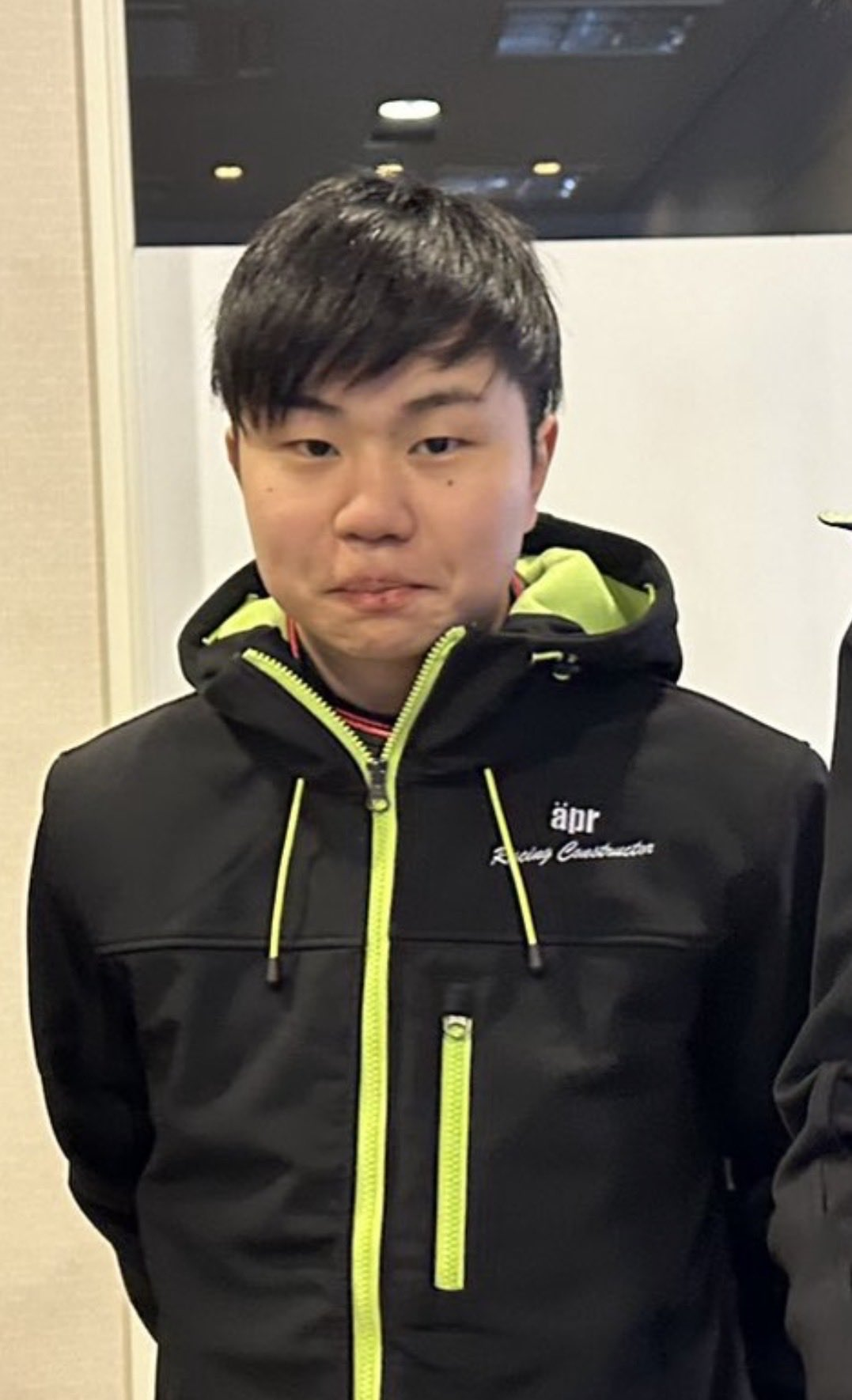
- Kobayashi in 2025
- Nationality: (Japan) Japanese
- Born: 1 July 2005 (age 21) Yamagata Prefecture, Japan

Super GT - GT500 career
- Debut season: 2025
- Current team: Toyota Gazoo Racing Cerumo
- Car number: 38
- Former teams: CarGuy Racing
- Starts: 8
- Wins: 1
- Podiums: 2
- Best finish: 3rd in 2025

Super Formula career
- Debut season: 2025
- Current team: TGMGP
- Car number: 28
- Former teams: Team Impul
- Starts: 2
- Wins: 0
- Podiums: 0
- Poles: 0
- Fastest laps: 0
- Best finish: 24th in 2025

Previous series
- 2024–2025 2022–2023: Super Formula Lights; F4 Japanese Championship

Championship titles
- 2023: F4 Japanese Championship

Rikuto Kobayashi (小林利徠斗, Kobayashi Rikuto; born 1 July 2005) is a Japanese racing driver who competes in the Super Formula Championship for TGM Grand Prix and in Super GT for Cerumo. A member of the TGR Driver Challenge Program, Kobayashi won the F4 Japanese Championship in 2023. Alongside his motorsport ventures, he also competes in sim racing, having previously competed in the Gran Turismo World Series.

He is not related to the 2021 24 Hours of Le Mans winner and fellow Super Formula driver Kamui Kobayashi.

== Single-seater career ==
=== Formula 4 ===
Kobayashi started his formula racing in 2022 at F4 Japanese Championship with TGR-DC Racing School as a part from he got TGR-DC RS Scholarship Driver. He finished sixth in the standings. Kobayashi continued to compete for the 2023 season. In a close F4 title battle with Jin Nakamura, Kobayashi claimed the title by winning the season finale at Motegi. On 30 May 2023, Toyota Gazoo Racing announced that Kobayashi would take part in the WEC Challenge Program training session for young drivers who are deemed to have a future in the Le Mans 24 Hours. He participated and experienced firsthand how WEC drivers and engineers take on the challenge of Le Mans.

=== Super Formula Lights ===
==== 2024 ====
Following his F4 championship victory, Kobayashi stepped up to Super Formula Lights with TOM'S alongside Jin Nakamura in 2024. After scoring a lone podium each in the opening rounds at Autopolis and Sugo, Kobayashi scored his maiden series win from pole position at Fuji. He finished third twice at Okayama but also retired from race 2 due to contact caused by Seita Nonaka. Kobayashi scored two podiums again at Suzuka, which included an inherited victory in race 2 following a penalty for Nonaka. A strong final round at Motegi, which saw him claim a pair of runner-up finishes and victory in race 2, allowed Kobayashi to vault to second in the championship standings.

==== 2025 ====
Kobayashi stayed for another season with TOM'S in 2025. The season opener at Suzuka yielded mixed results, as a pair of third places sandwiched a transmission failure in race 2. Sixth and fourth followed at Autopolis, causing Kobayashi to have only a third of championship leader Yuki Sano's points. A trio of podiums at Okayama brought him closer to the title fight, but with only two podiums from the four Sugo races, Kobayashi fell far behind a dominant Yuto Nomura. Contact with Sano spun Kobayashi out of the points in race 1 at Fuji, and although Kobayashi won race 2 in commanding fashion and finished third in race 3, another strong round confirmed Nomura as the champion. Kobayashi finished second in all three races at the season-ending Motegi event and ended up third in the standings.

=== Super Formula ===
Kobayashi sampled his first test of a Super Formula car in December 2024, taking over from series champion Sho Tsuboi on the final day of the rookie test at Suzuka. In 2025, Kobayashi made his Super Formula debut, driving for Itochu Enex Wecars Team Impul at Motegi.

In 2026, Kobayashi will make his full-season debut with KDDI TGMGP TGR-DC along with Kamui Kobayashi.

== Sportscar career ==
=== Super GT ===
==== GT300 ====
Kobayashi also will make his debut to compete in Super GT - GT300 with apr, as he partnered with Hiroaki Nagai and Manabu Orido. He was planned to become the third driver of Saitama Green Brave for the 2025 season, but Kobayashi instead went on to compete with CarGuy MKS Racing, which raced a Ferrari 296 GT3, alongside Zak O'Sullivan. The pair missed out on the GT300 championship by 2.5 points.

==== GT500 ====
Kobayashi then made a step up to the GT500 with Cerumo, as he replaces Hiroaki Ishiura.

== Esports career ==
Kobayashi has previously competed in the Gran Turismo World Series. In 2021, he won the semi-final in Group B, and claimed 3rd overall in the final round of the Toyota Gazoo Racing GT Cup.

== Racing record ==
=== Career summary ===
Season	Series	Team	Races	Wins	Poles	FLaps	Podiums	Points	Position
2022	F4 Japanese Championship	TGR-DC Racing School	14	1	2	1	2	120	6th
2023	F4 Japanese Championship	TGR-DC Racing School	14	5	5	3	9	221	**1st**
2024	Super Formula Lights	TOM'S	18	3	2	3	11	86	**2nd**
2024	Super GT – GT300	apr	8	0	0	0	0	0	NC
2024	TGR GR86/BRZ Cup	Nine with ARN RACING	2	0	0	0	0	0	NC
2024	Macau Grand Prix	TOM'S Formula	1	0	0	0	0	N/A	12th
2024	Super Taikyu – ST-2	KTMS	5	3	1	1	4	124‡	**1st‡**
2025	Super Formula Lights	TOM'S	18	1	1	2	12	85	**3rd**
2025	Super GT – GT300	CarGuy MKS Racing	8	1	2	1	2	83.5	**3rd**
2025	Super Taikyu – ST-X	apr	7	1	1	0	3	114‡	**3rd‡**
2025	Super Formula	Itochu Enex Wecars Team Impul	2	0	0	0	0	0	24th
2025	TGR GR86/BRZ Cup	Nine with ARN RACING	4	0	0	0	0	7	17th
2026	Super Formula	KDDI TGMGP TGR-DC							
2026	Super GT - GT500	TGR Team KeePer Cerumo	8	0	1	1	2	51	5th
2026	Super Taikyu - ST-4	Endless Sports							
2026	TGR GR86/BRZ Cup	Nine with ARN RACING							

^{*} Season still in progress.
‡ Team standings

=== Complete F4 Japanese Championship results ===
(key) (Races in bold indicate pole position) (Races in italics indicate fastest lap)

Year	Team	1	2	3	4	5	6	7	8	9	10	11	12	13	14	DC	Points
2022	TGR-DC Racing School	FUJ1; 1; 8	FUJ1; 2; 5	SUZ1; 1; 15	SUZ1; 2; 8	FUJ2; 1; 7	**FUJ2**; **2**; 5	SUZ2; 1; 4	SUZ2; 2; 5	SUG; 1; 3	SUG; 2; 7	AUT; 1; 5	AUT; 2 DNS	**MOT**; **1**; 1	**MOT**; **2**; 6	6th	120
2023	TGR-DC Racing School	**FUJ1**; **1**; 1	**FUJ1**; **2**; 3	**SUZ1**; **1**; 2	SUZ1; 2; 4	FUJ2; 1; 1	FUJ2; 2; 1	SUZ2; 1; 33	SUZ2; 2; 5	SUG; 1; 6	SUG; 2; 22	**AUT**; **1**; 1	AUT; 2; 3	**MOT**; **1**; 2	**MOT**; **2**; 1	1st	221

=== Complete Super GT results ===
(key) (Races in bold indicate pole position) (Races in italics indicate fastest lap)

Year	Team	Car	Class	1	2	3	4	5	6	7	8	9	DC	Points
2024	apr	Toyota GR86 GT300	GT300	OKA; 23	FUJ; 22	SUZ; 19	FUJ; 18	SUG; 21	AUT; 19	MOT; 19	SUZ; 20		NC	0
2025	CarGuy MKS Racing	Ferrari 296 GT3	GT300	OKA; 17	FUJ; 4	SEP	FS1; 4	FS2; 17	SUZ; 1	**SUG**; 8	**AUT**; 2	MOT; 7	3rd	83.5
2026	TGR Team KeePer Cerumo	Toyota GR Supra GT500	GT500	**OKA**; 2	FUJ; 13†	FUJ; 6	SUZ; 5	SUG; 10	AUT; 2	MOT; 11	MOT; 4		5th	51

^{‡} Half points awarded as less than 75% of race distance was completed.
^{(Number)} Driver did not take part in this sprint race, points are still awarded for the teammate's result.
^{*} Season still in progress.

=== Complete Super Formula Lights results ===
(key) (Races in bold indicate pole position) (Races in italics indicate fastest lap)

Year	Entrant	1	2	3	4	5	6	7	8	9	10	11	12	13	14	15	16	17	18	Pos	Points
2024	TOM'S	**AUT**; **1**; 2	AUT; 2; 8	AUT; 3; 3	SUG; 1; 7	SUG; 2; 3	SUG; 3; 5	FUJ; 1; 6	**FUJ**; **2**; 1	FUJ; 3; 5	OKA; 1; 3	OKA; 2 Ret	OKA; 3; 3	SUZ; 1; 3	SUZ; 2; 1	SUZ; 3; 4	MOT; 1; 2	MOT; 2; 1	MOT; 3; 2	2nd	86
2025	TOM'S	SUZ; 1; 3	SUZ; 2 Ret	SUZ; 3; 3	AUT; 1; 6	AUT; 2; 4	OKA; 1; 2	OKA; 2; 3	OKA; 3; 2	SUG; 1; 3	SUG; 2; 4	SUG; 3; 3	SUG; 4; 5	FUJ; 1; 11	**FUJ**; **2**; 1	FUJ; 3; 3	MOT; 1; 2	MOT; 2; 2	MOT; 3; 2	3rd	85

^{*} Season still in progress.

=== Complete Macau Grand Prix results ===
Year	Team	Car	Qualifying	Quali Race	Main race
2024	(Japan) TOM'S Formula	Tatuus F3 T-318	23rd	21st	12th

=== Complete Super Formula results ===
Year	Team	Engine	1	2	3	4	5	6	7	8	9	10	11	12	DC	Points
2025	Itochu Enex Wecars Team Impul	Toyota	SUZ	SUZ	MOT; 16	MOT; Ret	AUT	FUJ	FUJ	SUG	FUJ	SUZ	SUZ	SUZ	24th	0
2026	KDDI TGMGP TGR-DC	Toyota	MOT	MOT	AUT	SUZ	SUZ	FUJ	FUJ	SUG	FUJ	FUJ	SUZ	SUZ		

Sporting positions
Preceded by Syun Koide	F4 Japanese Championship; Champion; 2023	Succeeded by Yuto Nomura
