= 2024 Superrace Championship =

South Korean motor race series

The 2024 Superrace Championship is a South Korean motor racing series for stock cars, production cars, prototypes and production bikes. It is the 19th season running for the championship and the 18th season partnered by CJ Group and raced under the moniker 'Superrace Championship'. The championship is contested individually between 8 classes; Super 6000, GT, LUBEX M Class, Radical Cup Korea, the newly named Korea Trofeo motorbike class and three new categories; a standalone GT4 class, Prius PHEV Class and 'Alpine Class.

On 18 March, CJ Logistics signed a new title sponsorship agreement with the competition, which includes a revamp of the championship logo and rename with their integrated delivery brand, O-NE. Thus, for the first time since 2007, the championship will race under a different name; the 2024 O-NE Superrace Championship.

== Calendar ==
| Round | Event | Circuit | Location | Dates | Map |
|---|---|---|---|---|---|
| 1 | Super Exciting Superrace | Everland Speedway | Yongin-si, Gyeonggi-do | 20 April | 2024 Superrace Championship is located in South Korea |
| 2 | Super Exciting Superrace | Everland Speedway | Yongin-si, Gyeonggi-do | 21 April | 2024 Superrace Championship is located in South Korea |
| 3 | Asia Motorsports Carnival | Korea International Circuit | Yeongam-gun, Jeollanam-do | 19 May | 2024 Superrace Championship is located in South Korea |
| 4 | Summer Night Race Vol. 1 | Inje Speedium | Inje-gun, Gangwon-do | 15 June | 2024 Superrace Championship is located in South Korea |
| 5 | Summer Night Race Vol. 2 | Everland Speedway Night Course | Yongin-si, Gyeonggi-do | 13 July | 2024 Superrace Championship is located in South Korea |
| 6 | Summer Night Race Vol. 3 | Inje Speedium | Inje-gun, Gangwon-do | 24 August | 2024 Superrace Championship is located in South Korea |
| 7 | Jeonnam GT | Korea International Circuit | Yeongam-gun, Jeollanam-do | 12–13 October | 2024 Superrace Championship is located in South Korea |
| 8 | Golden Moments | Everland Speedway | Yongin-si, Gyeonggi-do | 2 November | 2024 Superrace Championship is located in South Korea |
| 9 | Golden Moments | Everland Speedway | Yongin-si, Gyeonggi-do | 3 November | 2024 Superrace Championship is located in South Korea |

== Teams and drivers ==
=== Super 6000 ===
Since 2020, all teams are currently using the Toyota GR Supra powered with a General Motors 6.2L LS3 V8 engine capable of producing 460 horsepower.

Key
Regular driver
Wildcard driver
Replacement driver

| Team | No. | Driver(s) | Tyre | Rounds |
|---|---|---|---|---|
| AMC Motorsports | 11 | (Thailand) Pete Thongchua | MI | 1–6 |
| AMC Motorsports | 17 | (Thailand) Rotor Thongchua | MI | 1–2, 4–6 |
| AMC Motorsports | 21 | (South Korea) Kim Hak-kyum | MI | 6 |
| AMC Motorsports | 81 | (Japan) Aoki Takayuki | MI | 3 |
| AMC Motorsports | 86 | (South Korea) Kim Seong-hun | MI | 1–5 |
| Brand New Racing | 03 | (South Korea) Park Seok-chan | MI | All |
| Brand New Racing | 38 | (South Korea) Park Gyu-seung | MI | All |
| Brand New Racing | 58 | (South Korea) Na Yeon-woo | MI | 6–9 |
| Brand New Racing | 61 | (South Korea) Go Se-jun | MI | 3–5 |
| Brand New Racing | 87 | (South Korea) Lee Hyo-jun | MI | 1–2 |
| JUN-FITTED Racing | 12 | (South Korea) Hwang Jin-woo | MI | All |
| JUN-FITTED Racing | 77 | (South Korea) Park Jung-jun | MI | All |
| O-NE Racing | 02 | (South Korea) Kim Dong-eun | NEX | All |
| O-NE Racing | 13 | (South Korea) Lee Jung-woo | NEX | All |
| O-NE Racing | 50 | (South Korea) Oh Han-sol | NEX | All |
| ONE Racing | 08 | (South Korea) Lim Min-jin | NEX | All |
| ONE Racing | 29 | (South Korea) Ahn Hyun-jun | NEX | 1–2 |
| ONE Racing | 63 | (South Korea) Choi Gwang-bin | NEX | All |
| ONE Racing | 98 | (South Korea) Kang Jin-seong | NEX | 3–9 |
| Seohan GP | 04 | (South Korea) Jung Eui-chul | NEX | All |
| Seohan GP | 05 | (South Korea) Kim Joong-kun | NEX | All |
| Seohan GP | 06 | (South Korea) Jang Hyun-jin | NEX | All |

== Season summary ==
=== Super 6000 ===
| Round | Race | Pole position | Fastest lap | Winning driver | Winning team | Winning tyre | Ref |
|---|---|---|---|---|---|---|---|
| 1 | Super Exciting Superrace | (South Korea) Hwang Jin-woo | (South Korea) Jung Eui-chul | (South Korea) Jung Eui-chul | Seohan GP | Nexen | |
| 2 | Super Exciting Superrace | (South Korea) Jang Hyun-jin | (South Korea) Lee Jung-woo | (South Korea) Jang Hyun-jin | Seohan GP | Nexen | |
| 3 | Asia Motorsports Carnival | (South Korea) Park Gyu-seung | (South Korea) Lee Chang-uk | (South Korea) Jang Hyun-jin | Seohan GP | Nexen | |
| 4 | Summer Night Race Vol. 1 | (South Korea) Choi Gwang-bin | (South Korea) Lee Jung-woo | (South Korea) Jang Hyun-jin | Seohan GP | Nexen | |
| 5 | Summer Night Race Vol. 2 | (South Korea) Kim Joong-kun | (South Korea) Oh Han-sol | (South Korea) Kim Joong-kun | Seohan GP | Nexen | |
| 6 | Summer Night Race Vol. 3 | (South Korea) Lee Jung-woo | (South Korea) Choi Gwang-bin | (South Korea) Choi Gwang-bin | ONE Racing | Nexen | |
| 7 | Jeonnam GT | (South Korea) Jeong Eu-cheol | | (South Korea) Hwang Jin-woo | Jun-Fitted Racing | Michelin | |
| 8 | Golden Moments | (South Korea) Park Kyu-seung | | (South Korea) Jeong Eu-cheol | Seohan GP | Nexen | |
| 9 | Golden Moments | (South Korea) Hwang Jin-woo | | (South Korea) Choi Gwang-bin | ONE Racing | Nexen | |

== Championship standings ==
=== Drivers championships ===
==== Scoring system ====
| Position | 1st | 2nd | 3rd | 4th | 5th | 6th | 7th | 8th | 9th | 10th | Race completion |
|---|---|---|---|---|---|---|---|---|---|---|---|
| Race | 25 | 18 | 15 | 12 | 10 | 8 | 6 | 4 | 2 | 1 | 1 |
| Round 3 | 30 | 22 | 18 | 14 | 12 | 9 | 7 | 5 | 3 | 2 | 1 |
| Qualifying | 3 | 2 | 1 | | | | | | | | |

==== Super 6000 ====
2024 Super 6000 Driver Standings
| Rank | Driver | EVE1 (South Korea) | EVE2 (South Korea) | KOR1 (South Korea) | INJ1 (South Korea) | ESNC (South Korea) | INJ2 (South Korea) | KOR2 (South Korea) | EVE4 (South Korea) | EVE5 (South Korea) | Points |
|---|---|---|---|---|---|---|---|---|---|---|---|
| 1 | (South Korea) Jang Hyun-Jin | 9 | 1^{1} | 1^{3} | 7 | 5 | 3 | | | | 117 |
| 2 | (South Korea) Kim Jung-gun | 4^{2} | 2^{3} | DSQ^{2} | 4^{1} | 1 | 5 | | | | 86 |
| 3 | (South Korea) Cheung Eui-cheol | 1 | 3 | Ret | 2^{2} | 2^{2} | Ret^{3} | | | | 78 |
| 4 | (South Korea) Hwang Jin-woo | 2^{1} | 7 | 4 | 9 | 7 | 7 | | | | 74 |
| 5 | (South Korea) Kim Dong-eun | 5 | 6 | 6 | 6 | 4 | 2 | | | | 63 |
| 6 | (South Korea) Park Gyu-seung | 3^{3} | 8 | 3^{1} | 8 | 11 | 8 | | | | 58 |
| 7 | (South Korea) Lee Jung-woo | Ret | 5 | 2 | 3^{3} | 6 | Ret^{1} | | | | 54 |
| 8 | (South Korea) Oh Han-sol | 11 | 4^{2} | 8 | 5 | 3^{3} | 4 | | | | 54 |
| 9 | (South Korea) Choi Gwang-bin | 7 | Ret | 13 | 1^{1} | Ret | 1^{2} | | | | 53 |
| 10 | (South Korea) Park Seok-chan | 6 | Ret | 5 | 12 | 10 | 9 | | | | 46 |
| 11 | (South Korea) Park Jung-joon | 8 | 9 | 7 | 14 | 9 | 12 | | | | 22 |
| 12 | (South Korea) Kang Jin-sung | | | 9 | 10 | DSQ | 6 | | | | 13 |
| 13 | (South Korea) Lim Min-jin | Ret | 10 | 10 | 13 | 8 | 10 | | | | 13 |
| 14 | (Thailand) Pete Thongchua | 10 | 13 | 12 | 17 | 14 | 14 | | | | 7 |
| 15 | (South Korea) Kim Sung-hoon | 12 | 14 | 11 | 15 | 13 | | | | | 5 |
| 16 | (South Korea) Ko Se-jun | | | DNS | 11 | Ret | | | | | 3 |
| 17 | (Thailand) Rotor Thongchua | Ret | 11 | | 16 | 12 | Ret | | | | 3 |
| 18 | (South Korea) Na Yeon-woo | | | | | | 11 | | | | 1 |
| 19 | (South Korea) Kim Hak-kyum | | | | | | 13 | | | | 1 |
| 20 | (South Korea) Lee Hyo-jun | Ret | 12 | | | | | | | | 1 |
| 21 | (Japan) Aoki Takayuki | | | Ret | | | | | | | 0 |
| 22 | (South Korea) Ahn Hyun-joon | Ret | Ret | | | | | | | | 0 |
| Rank | Driver | EVE1 (South Korea) | EVE2 (South Korea) | KOR1 (South Korea) | INJ1 (South Korea) | ESNC (South Korea) | INJ2 (South Korea) | KOR2 (South Korea) | EVE4 (South Korea) | EVE5 (South Korea) | Points |

Key
| Colour | Result |
|---|---|
| Gold | Winner |
| Silver | 2nd place |
| Bronze | 3rd place |
| Green | Other points position |
| Blue | Other classified position |
| Blue | Not classified, finished (NC) |
| Purple | Not classified, retired (Ret) |
| Red | Did not qualify (DNQ) |
| Red | Did not pre-qualify (DNPQ) |
| Black | Disqualified (DSQ) |
| White | Did not start (DNS) |
| White | Race cancelled (C) |
| Blank | Did not practice (DNP) |
| Blank | Excluded (EX) |
| Blank | Did not arrive (DNA) |
| Blank | Withdrawn (WD) |
| Annotation | Meaning |
| Superscript number^{123} | Points-scoring position in qualifying |
| **Bold** | Pole position |
| Italics | Fastest lap |

=== Teams championships ===
==== Super 6000 ====
The teams championship is decided upon points scored by two drivers per team after each race. Teams with 3 or more drivers have 15 days before each race to select two drivers to add their points towards their final tally.

2024 Super 6000 Team Standings
| Rank | Team | EVE1 (South Korea) | EVE2 (South Korea) | KOR1 (South Korea) | INJ1 (South Korea) | ESNC (South Korea) | INJ2 (South Korea) | KOR2 (South Korea) | EVE4 (South Korea) | EVE5 (South Korea) | Points |
|---|---|---|---|---|---|---|---|---|---|---|---|
| 1 | | | | | | | | | | | |
| 2 | | | | | | | | | | | |
| 3 | | | | | | | | | | | |
| 4 | | | | | | | | | | | |
| 5 | | | | | | | | | | | |
| 6 | | | | | | | | | | | |
| Rank | Team | EVE1 (South Korea) | EVE2 (South Korea) | KOR1 (South Korea) | INJ1 (South Korea) | ESNC (South Korea) | INJ2 (South Korea) | KOR2 (South Korea) | EVE4 (South Korea) | EVE5 (South Korea) | Points |

Key
| Colour | Result |
|---|---|
| Gold | Winner |
| Silver | 2nd place |
| Bronze | 3rd place |
| Green | Other points position |
| Blue | Other classified position |
| Blue | Not classified, finished (NC) |
| Purple | Not classified, retired (Ret) |
| Red | Did not qualify (DNQ) |
| Red | Did not pre-qualify (DNPQ) |
| Black | Disqualified (DSQ) |
| White | Did not start (DNS) |
| White | Race cancelled (C) |
| Blank | Did not practice (DNP) |
| Blank | Excluded (EX) |
| Blank | Did not arrive (DNA) |
| Blank | Withdrawn (WD) |
| Annotation | Meaning |
| Superscript number^{123} | Points-scoring position in qualifying |
| **Bold** | Pole position |
| Italics | Fastest lap |

=== Tyre manufacturers championships ===
Like the teams championship, the tyre manufacturers must select 5 drivers per tyre user 15 days before each round to add their points towards their final tally.

2023 Super 6000 Tyre Manufacturer Standings
| Rank | Team | EVE1 (South Korea) | EVE2 (South Korea) | KOR1 (South Korea) | INJ1 (South Korea) | ESNC (South Korea) | INJ2 (South Korea) | KOR2 (South Korea) | EVE4 (South Korea) | EVE5 (South Korea) | Points |
|---|---|---|---|---|---|---|---|---|---|---|---|
| 1 | (South Korea) Kumho | | | | | | | | | | 393 |
| 2 | (France) Michelin | | | | | | | | | | 191 |
| Rank | Team | EVE1 (South Korea) | EVE2 (South Korea) | KOR1 (South Korea) | INJ1 (South Korea) | ESNC (South Korea) | INJ2 (South Korea) | KOR2 (South Korea) | EVE4 (South Korea) | EVE5 (South Korea) | Points |

Key
| Colour | Result |
|---|---|
| Gold | Winner |
| Silver | 2nd place |
| Bronze | 3rd place |
| Green | Other points position |
| Blue | Other classified position |
| Blue | Not classified, finished (NC) |
| Purple | Not classified, retired (Ret) |
| Red | Did not qualify (DNQ) |
| Red | Did not pre-qualify (DNPQ) |
| Black | Disqualified (DSQ) |
| White | Did not start (DNS) |
| White | Race cancelled (C) |
| Blank | Did not practice (DNP) |
| Blank | Excluded (EX) |
| Blank | Did not arrive (DNA) |
| Blank | Withdrawn (WD) |
| Annotation | Meaning |
| Superscript number^{123} | Points-scoring position in qualifying |
| **Bold** | Pole position |
| Italics | Fastest lap |
