= Lee Jungwoo =

South Korean racing driver (born 1995)

- Born: 24 January 1995 (age 31); Daegu, South Korea
- Nationality: (South Korea) South Korean

Super GT career
- Debut season: 2026
- Current team: Anest Iwata Racing
- Car number: 26
- Starts: 6
- Wins: 0
- Podiums: 0
- Poles: 0
- Fastest laps: 0
- Best finish: 37th in 2026

Korean name
- Hangul: 이정우
- RR: I Jeongu
- MR: I Chŏngu

Lee Jungwoo (Korean: 이정우; born 24 January 1995) is a South Korean racing driver who last competed in the GT300 class of Super GT for Anest Iwata Racing.

== Career ==
Born and raised in Daegu, Lee competed in karting and studied at Keimyung University, where he majored in Japanese studies. While studying at Aoyama University as an exchange student, Lee entered the GT Academy shootout 'for fun' in 2015, winning the Japanese final in July, but missing out on the Asian finals a month later at Silverstone.

In 2016, Lee made his single-seater debut at the Suzuka round of the F4 Japanese Championship for Silver Star Racing, taking a best result of 20th in race one. Moving to Super FJ and Media Do Kageyama Racing for 2017, Lee took a lone podium in the Fuji Series and participated in the end-of-year All-Japan Masters Race at Suzuka. Continuing in the category the following year, Lee primarily raced in the Sugo Series, in which he secured a third-place points finish. During 2018, Lee also made his debut in the ASA GT class of the Superrace Championship for Luxon Mall, and winning the Fuji 24 Hours in the ST-1 class for D'station Racing.

The following year, Lee's full-time campaign was in the ASA 6000 class of Superrace with CJ Logistics Racing, taking a best result of third at Everland to take 14th in points. During 2019, Lee returned to Super Taikyu for a part-time campaign in the ST-TCR class with Waimarama Kizuna Racing Team. Switching to ECSTA Racing for the 2020 Superrace season, Lee took a pair second-place finishes at Inje and Everland en route to a sixth in the overall standings. Continuing with ECSTA for 2021, Lee dropped to ninth in points, taking a lone podium at Everland and his maiden series pole at Yeongam. Remaining with ECSTA for the following year, Lee once again was ninth in the overall standings, with a pair of podiums at Inje and Everland to his name.

After serving his compulsory military service in 2023, Lee returned to racing the following year by joining O-NE Racing to compete in the Super 6000 class of the Superrace Championship. On his comeback season, Lee kicked off the season with a second-place finish at Yeongam, a pole at Inje and a third-place finish at Everland to take ninth in points. In parallel, Lee also raced with M&K Racing in the ST-TCR class of Super Taikyu, taking wins at Suzuka and Fuji to help the team clinch the class title.

In late 2024, Lee signed a two-year contract extension with O-NE Racing to continue competing in the Superrace Championship. In his seventh season in the series, Lee had a breakout year, taking a pair of second-place finishes at Yeongam and Inje, as well as a third-place finish at the Everland finale to close out the year third overall. In parallel, Lee competed for Waimarama Racing in Super Taikyu, taking wins at SUGO and Okayama to help the team secure ST-TCR class honours. During 2025, Lee also competed for Racegraph in the majority of the Lamborghini Super Trofeo Asia season, most notably taking a Pro class win in race one at Fuji.

In 2026, Lee joined Anest Iwata Racing to make his Super GT debut in GT300, as well as moving to Kumho SLM to remain in the Superrace Championship. In Super GT, Lee competed in the first six races of the season, in which he took a best result of ninth at Autopolis.

== Racing record ==
=== Racing career summary ===
Season	Series	Team	Races	Wins	Poles	F/Laps	Podiums	Points	Position
2016	F4 Japanese Championship	Silver Star Racing	2	0	0	0	0	0	43rd
2017	Super FJ – Fuji Series	Media Do Kageyama Racing	4	0	0	0	1	31	5th
2017	Super FJ – Suzuka Series	Media Do Kageyama Racing	1	0	0	0	0	0	NC
2017	Super FJ – All-Japan Masters Race	Media Do Kageyama Racing	1	0	0	0	0	—N/a	15th
2018	Superrace Championship – ASA GT	Luxon Mall	8	0	0	0	0	0	14th
2018	Super FJ – Sugo Series	Team Korea with leprix							**3rd**
2018	Super FJ – Suzuka Series	Team Korea with leprix	1	0	0	0	0	3	20th
2018	Super Taikyu Series – ST-1	D'station Racing	1	1	0	0	1	127‡	**1st‡**
2019	Superrace Championship – ASA 6000	CJ Logistics Racing	9	0	0	0	1	34	14th
2019	Super Taikyu Series – ST-TCR	Waimarama Kizuna Racing Team	3	0	0	0	2	78.5‡	5th‡
2020	Superrace Championship – ASA 6000	ECSTA Racing	8	0	0	0	2	92	6th
2021	Superrace Championship – Super 6000	ECSTA Racing	8	0	1	0	1	59	9th
2022	Superrace Championship – Super 6000	ECSTA Racing	8	0	0	0	2	66	9th
2022	Super Taikyu Series – ST-Z	Porsche Team EBI Waimarama	1	0	0	0	0	80‡	5th‡
2024	Superrace Championship – Super 6000	O-NE Racing	9	0	1	0	2	83	9th
2024	Super Taikyu – ST-TCR	M&K Racing	5	2	1	0	5	122‡	**1st‡**
2025	Superrace Championship – TGR 6000	O-NE Racing	9	0	0	0	3	109	**3rd**
2025	Lamborghini Super Trofeo Asia – Pro-Am	Racegraph	2	0	0	0	0	11	12th
2025	Lamborghini Super Trofeo Asia – Pro	Racegraph	8	1	1	0	6	86	8th
2025	Super Taikyu – ST-TCR	Waimarama Racing	6	2	1	0	5	122‡	**1st‡**
2026	Super GT – GT300	Anest Iwata Racing	6	0	0	0	0	7	37th
2026	Superrace Championship – TGR 6000	Kumho SLM						*	*
2026	Nürburgring Langstrecken-Serie – VT2-RWD	SRS Team Sorg Rennsport							
2026	Nürburgring Langstrecken-Serie – SP10 Pro-Am	AV Racing by Black Falcon	1	0	0	0	1	11	NC
2026	Super Taikyu – ST-TCR	Waimarama Racing						‡	‡

‡ Team standings.

=== Complete F4 Japanese Championship results ===
(key) (Races in bold indicate pole position) (Races in italics indicate fastest lap)

Year	Team	1	2	3	4	5	6	7	8	9	10	11	12	13	14	DC	Pts
2016	Silver Star Racing	OKA; 1	OKA; 2	FUJ1; 1	FUJ1; 2	SUG; 1	SUG; 2	FUJ2; 1	FUJ2; 2	FUJ2; 3	SUZ; 1; 20	SUZ; 2; 26	MOT; 1	MOT; 2	MOT; 3	43rd	0

=== Complete Super GT results ===
(key) (Races in bold indicate pole position) (Races in italics indicate fastest lap)

Year	Team	Car	Class	1	2	3	4	5	6	7	8	DC	Points
2026	Anest Iwata Racing	Nissan Fairlady Z GT300 (RZ34)	GT300	OKA; 21	FUJ1; 26	FUJ2; 29	SUZ; 23	SUG; 22	AUT; 9	MOT1	MOT2	37th	7

^{‡} Half points awarded as less than 75% of race distance was completed.
^{*} Season still in progress.
