= 2025 Super Taikyu Series =

Japanese sports car racing season

The 2025 Eneos Super Taikyu Series Empowered by Bridgestone was the thirty-fifth season of the Super Taikyu endurance racing championship. It began on 22 March at Mobility Resort Motegi and finished on 16 November at Fuji Speedway.

== Calendar ==
The Super Taikyu Series announced its provisional 2025 calendar on 18 November 2024, with seven rounds held at Japan's six major motor racing circuits.

Round	Event	Race Length	Race Format	Classes	Circuit	Date
1	Motegi Super Taikyu 4 Hours Race	4 hours	2 races	ST-Z / TCR / 4 / 5F / 5R	Mobility Resort Motegi	22 March
1	Motegi Super Taikyu 4 Hours Race	4 hours	2 races	ST-X / Z / Q / 1 / 2 / 3 / 4	Mobility Resort Motegi	23 March
2	Round 2 Suzuka	5 hours	1 race	ST-X / Z / Q / 1 / 3 / 4 / 5F / 5R	Suzuka Circuit	27 April
3	Fuji 24 Hour Race	24 hours	1 race	All	Fuji Speedway	31 May–1 June
4	Round 4 SUGO Super Taikyu 4-Hour Race	4 hours	2 races	ST-2 / 5F / 5R	Sportsland SUGO	5 July
4	Round 4 SUGO Super Taikyu 4-Hour Race	4 hours	2 races	ST-X / Z / Q / TCR / 1	Sportsland SUGO	6 July
5	Round 5 Super Taikyu Race in Autopolis	5 hours	1 race	ST-X / Q / TCR / 2 / 3 / 4 / 5F / 5R	Autopolis	26–27 July
6	Round 6 Super Taikyu Race in Okayama	3 hours	2 races	AM : ST-2 / 3 / 5F / 5R; PM : ST-X / Z / Q / TCR / 1	Okayama International Circuit	25–26 October
7	Round 7 S-Taikyu Final Thanksgiving Festival	4 hours	1 race	ST-X / Z / Q / TCR / 1 / 2 / 3 / 4	Fuji Speedway	16 November

== Teams and drivers ==
=== ST-X (FIA GT3) ===
Team	Car	Engine	No.	Drivers	Rounds
(Japan) TKRI	Mercedes-AMG GT3 Evo	Mercedes-AMG M159 6.2 L V8	23	(Japan) "Daisuke"	All
(Japan) TKRI	Mercedes-AMG GT3 Evo	Mercedes-AMG M159 6.2 L V8	23	(Japan) Shunji Okumoto	All
(Japan) TKRI	Mercedes-AMG GT3 Evo	Mercedes-AMG M159 6.2 L V8	23	(Japan) Yuhki Nakayama	1–5, 7
(Japan) TKRI	Mercedes-AMG GT3 Evo	Mercedes-AMG M159 6.2 L V8	23	(Japan) Tatsuya Kataoka	1, 3–4, 6–7
(Japan) TKRI	Mercedes-AMG GT3 Evo	Mercedes-AMG M159 6.2 L V8	23	(Japan) Yuya Motojima	3
(Japan) apr	Lexus RC F GT3	Toyota 2UR-GSE 5.4 L V8	31	(Japan) Rikuto Kobayashi	All
(Japan) apr	Lexus RC F GT3	Toyota 2UR-GSE 5.4 L V8	31	(Japan) Koki Saga	All
(Japan) apr	Lexus RC F GT3	Toyota 2UR-GSE 5.4 L V8	31	(Japan) Hiroaki Nagai	1–3, 6–7
(Japan) apr	Lexus RC F GT3	Toyota 2UR-GSE 5.4 L V8	31	(Japan) Naoya Gamou	1, 3–7
(Japan) apr	Lexus RC F GT3	Toyota 2UR-GSE 5.4 L V8	31	(Japan) Hideki Nagai	3
(Japan) apr	Lexus RC F GT3	Toyota 2UR-GSE 5.4 L V8	31	(Japan) Sena Sakaguchi	3
(Japan) apr	Lexus RC F GT3	Toyota 2UR-GSE 5.4 L V8	31	(Japan) Ryuta Ukai	4–5
(Hong Kong) Craft-Bamboo Racing	Mercedes-AMG GT3 Evo	Mercedes-AMG M159 6.2 L V8	33	(Chinese Taipei) Jeffrey Lee	2–4, 6–7
(Hong Kong) Craft-Bamboo Racing	Mercedes-AMG GT3 Evo	Mercedes-AMG M159 6.2 L V8	33	(Japan) Kakunoshin Ohta	2–4, 7
(Hong Kong) Craft-Bamboo Racing	Mercedes-AMG GT3 Evo	Mercedes-AMG M159 6.2 L V8	33	(Australia) Jayden Ojeda	2
(Hong Kong) Craft-Bamboo Racing	Mercedes-AMG GT3 Evo	Mercedes-AMG M159 6.2 L V8	33	(Germany) Tom Kalender	3–4, 7
(Hong Kong) Craft-Bamboo Racing	Mercedes-AMG GT3 Evo	Mercedes-AMG M159 6.2 L V8	33	(Canada) Dean Chen	3–4
(Hong Kong) Craft-Bamboo Racing	Mercedes-AMG GT3 Evo	Mercedes-AMG M159 6.2 L V8	33	(Japan) Seiya Motojima	3
(Hong Kong) Craft-Bamboo Racing	Mercedes-AMG GT3 Evo	Mercedes-AMG M159 6.2 L V8	33	(Hong Kong) Adderly Fong	6
(Hong Kong) Craft-Bamboo Racing	Mercedes-AMG GT3 Evo	Mercedes-AMG M159 6.2 L V8	33	(China) "JZ"	6
(Japan) GTNET MotorSports	Nissan GT-R Nismo GT3	Nissan VR38DETT 3.8 L twin-turbocharged V6	81	(Japan) Nobuyuki Oyagi	3, 6–7
(Japan) GTNET MotorSports	Nissan GT-R Nismo GT3	Nissan VR38DETT 3.8 L twin-turbocharged V6	81	(Japan) Ryuichiro Oyagi	3, 6–7
(Japan) GTNET MotorSports	Nissan GT-R Nismo GT3	Nissan VR38DETT 3.8 L twin-turbocharged V6	81	(Japan) Natsu Sakaguchi	3, 6–7
(Japan) GTNET MotorSports	Nissan GT-R Nismo GT3	Nissan VR38DETT 3.8 L twin-turbocharged V6	81	(Japan) Takayuki Aoki	3, 6–7
(Japan) GTNET MotorSports	Nissan GT-R Nismo GT3	Nissan VR38DETT 3.8 L twin-turbocharged V6	81	(Japan) Iori Kimura	3
(Japan) Hitotsuyama Racing	Audi R8 LMS Evo II	Audi DAR 5.2 L V10	101	(Japan) Kenji Suzuki	1–3, 5, 7
(Japan) Hitotsuyama Racing	Audi R8 LMS Evo II	Audi DAR 5.2 L V10	101	(United Kingdom) James Pull	1–3, 5, 7
(Japan) Hitotsuyama Racing	Audi R8 LMS Evo II	Audi DAR 5.2 L V10	101	(Japan) Sota Ogawa	1–3, 5, 7
(Japan) Hitotsuyama Racing	Audi R8 LMS Evo II	Audi DAR 5.2 L V10	101	(Japan) Anna Inotsume	1–3, 5, 7
(Japan) Hitotsuyama Racing	Audi R8 LMS Evo II	Audi DAR 5.2 L V10	101	(Japan) Shintaro Kawabata	3
(Japan) Seven x Seven Racing	Porsche 911 GT3 R (992)	Porsche M97/80 4.2 L Flat-6	666	(Japan) "Bankcy"	1–3, 6–7
(Japan) Seven x Seven Racing	Porsche 911 GT3 R (992)	Porsche M97/80 4.2 L Flat-6	666	(Japan) Kiyoto Fujinami	1–3, 6–7
(Japan) Seven x Seven Racing	Porsche 911 GT3 R (992)	Porsche M97/80 4.2 L Flat-6	666	(Japan) Taichi Watarai	1–3, 6–7
(Japan) Seven x Seven Racing	Porsche 911 GT3 R (992)	Porsche M97/80 4.2 L Flat-6	666	(Japan) Tsubasa Kondo	1–3
(Japan) Seven x Seven Racing	Porsche 911 GT3 R (992)	Porsche M97/80 4.2 L Flat-6	666	(Brazil) João Paulo de Oliveira	3
(Japan) D'station Racing	Aston Martin Vantage AMR GT3 Evo	Aston Martin AMR16A 4.0 L Turbo V8	777	(Japan) Satoshi Hoshino	1–2, 4–7
(Japan) D'station Racing	Aston Martin Vantage AMR GT3 Evo	Aston Martin AMR16A 4.0 L Turbo V8	777	(Japan) Tomonobu Fujii	1–2, 4–7
(Japan) D'station Racing	Aston Martin Vantage AMR GT3 Evo	Aston Martin AMR16A 4.0 L Turbo V8	777	(Japan) Yuta Kamimura	1–2, 4–7

- Team HandWork Challenge was announced to compete in the series, but did not compete as they focus on 2025 Suzuka 1000 km.
- Charlie Fagg was announced to compete in the series with D'station Racing, but he did not make a single appearance.

=== ST-Z (SRO GT4) ===
Team	Car	Engine	No.	Drivers	Rounds
(Japan) Team Noah	Toyota GR Supra GT4 Evo2	Toyota B58H 3.0 L Twin-Turbo I6	5	(Japan) Aruga Tomita	1–3, 6–7
(Japan) Team Noah	Toyota GR Supra GT4 Evo2	Toyota B58H 3.0 L Twin-Turbo I6	5	(Japan) Kokoro Morita	1–3, 6–7
(Japan) Team Noah	Toyota GR Supra GT4 Evo2	Toyota B58H 3.0 L Twin-Turbo I6	5	(Japan) Masanobu Kato	1–2
(Japan) Team Noah	Toyota GR Supra GT4 Evo2	Toyota B58H 3.0 L Twin-Turbo I6	5	(Japan) Toshiro Tsukada (Note: Toshiro Tsukada raced in group 1, Yuji Kiyotaki raced in group 2)	1, 3
(Japan) Team Noah	Toyota GR Supra GT4 Evo2	Toyota B58H 3.0 L Twin-Turbo I6	5	(Japan) Yuji Kiyotaki	1
(Japan) Team Noah	Toyota GR Supra GT4 Evo2	Toyota B58H 3.0 L Twin-Turbo I6	5	(Japan) Kazuya Shimogaki	2, 6–7
(Japan) Team Noah	Toyota GR Supra GT4 Evo2	Toyota B58H 3.0 L Twin-Turbo I6	5	(Japan) Yusuke Shiotsu	3
(Japan) Team Noah	Toyota GR Supra GT4 Evo2	Toyota B58H 3.0 L Twin-Turbo I6	5	(Japan) Takuya Nakazawa	3
(Japan) Team Impul	Nissan Z Nismo GT4	Nissan VR30DDTT 3.0 L Twin-Turbo V6	20	(Japan) Takashi Matsumoto	1–4, 6–7
(Japan) Team Impul	Nissan Z Nismo GT4	Nissan VR30DDTT 3.0 L Twin-Turbo V6	20	(Japan) Kazuki Hiramine	1–4, 6–7
(Japan) Team Impul	Nissan Z Nismo GT4	Nissan VR30DDTT 3.0 L Twin-Turbo V6	20	(Japan) Kazuki Oki	1–4, 6–7
(Japan) Team Impul	Nissan Z Nismo GT4	Nissan VR30DDTT 3.0 L Twin-Turbo V6	20	(France) Jules Kazuki Tréluyer	1–3, 7
(Japan) Team Impul	Nissan Z Nismo GT4	Nissan VR30DDTT 3.0 L Twin-Turbo V6	20	(Belgium) Bertrand Baguette	3
(Japan) Hitotsuyama Racing	Mercedes-AMG GT4	Mercedes-AMG M178 4.0 L V8	21	(Japan) Daisuke Yamawaki	1–4, 6–7
(Japan) Hitotsuyama Racing	Mercedes-AMG GT4	Mercedes-AMG M178 4.0 L V8	21	(United Kingdom) Sean Walkinshaw	1–4, 6–7
(Japan) Hitotsuyama Racing	Mercedes-AMG GT4	Mercedes-AMG M178 4.0 L V8	21	(Italy) Alessandro Bressan	1–4, 6–7
(Japan) Hitotsuyama Racing	Mercedes-AMG GT4	Mercedes-AMG M178 4.0 L V8	21	(Finland) Max Salo	1–3
(Japan) Hitotsuyama Racing	Mercedes-AMG GT4	Mercedes-AMG M178 4.0 L V8	21	(Japan) Munehisa Iijima	3
(Japan) Hitotsuyama Racing	Mercedes-AMG GT4	Mercedes-AMG M178 4.0 L V8	21	(Canada) Jim Walsh	3
(Japan) Hitotsuyama Racing	Mercedes-AMG GT4	Mercedes-AMG M178 4.0 L V8	21	(Japan) Kuniyuki Haga	7
(Japan) Porsche Team EBI	Porsche 718 Cayman GT4 RS Clubsport	Porsche MDG.GA 4.0 L Flat-6	22	(Japan) Shota Kitazono	1–4, 6–7
(Japan) Porsche Team EBI	Porsche 718 Cayman GT4 RS Clubsport	Porsche MDG.GA 4.0 L Flat-6	22	(Japan) Rintaro Kubo	1–4, 6–7
(Japan) Porsche Team EBI	Porsche 718 Cayman GT4 RS Clubsport	Porsche MDG.GA 4.0 L Flat-6	22	(Japan) Ryoma Henzan	1–4, 6–7
(Japan) Porsche Team EBI	Porsche 718 Cayman GT4 RS Clubsport	Porsche MDG.GA 4.0 L Flat-6	22	(Japan) Naoya Yamano	3, 6–7
(Japan) Porsche Team EBI	Porsche 718 Cayman GT4 RS Clubsport	Porsche MDG.GA 4.0 L Flat-6	22	(Japan) Keishi Ishikawa	3
(Japan) Team ZeroOne	Nissan Z Nismo GT4	Nissan VR30DDTT 3.0 L Twin-Turbo V6	25	(Japan) Tsugio Matsuda	1–4, 6–7
(Japan) Team ZeroOne	Nissan Z Nismo GT4	Nissan VR30DDTT 3.0 L Twin-Turbo V6	25	(Japan) Teppei Natori	1–4, 6–7
(Japan) Team ZeroOne	Nissan Z Nismo GT4	Nissan VR30DDTT 3.0 L Twin-Turbo V6	25	(Japan) Kimiya Sato	1–4, 6–7
(Japan) Team ZeroOne	Nissan Z Nismo GT4	Nissan VR30DDTT 3.0 L Twin-Turbo V6	25	(Japan) Tadao Uematsu	1
(Japan) Team ZeroOne	Nissan Z Nismo GT4	Nissan VR30DDTT 3.0 L Twin-Turbo V6	25	(Japan) Yuki Tanaka	2–4, 6–7
(Japan) Team ZeroOne	Nissan Z Nismo GT4	Nissan VR30DDTT 3.0 L Twin-Turbo V6	25	(Italy) Ronnie Quintarelli	3
(Japan) Team ZeroOne	Nissan Z Nismo GT4	Nissan VR30DDTT 3.0 L Twin-Turbo V6	25	(Japan) Masataka Yanagida	3
(Japan) Team ZeroOne	Nissan Z Nismo GT4	Nissan VR30DDTT 3.0 L Twin-Turbo V6	26	(Japan) Ryuichiro Otsuka	1–4, 6–7
(Japan) Team ZeroOne	Nissan Z Nismo GT4	Nissan VR30DDTT 3.0 L Twin-Turbo V6	26	(Japan) Ryuichiro Tomita	1–4, 6–7
(Japan) Team ZeroOne	Nissan Z Nismo GT4	Nissan VR30DDTT 3.0 L Twin-Turbo V6	26	(Japan) Takuro Shinohara	1–4, 6–7
(Japan) Team ZeroOne	Nissan Z Nismo GT4	Nissan VR30DDTT 3.0 L Twin-Turbo V6	26	(Japan) Seiji Ara	1–2, 4, 7
(Japan) Team ZeroOne	Nissan Z Nismo GT4	Nissan VR30DDTT 3.0 L Twin-Turbo V6	26	(Brazil) Igor Omura Fraga	3
(Japan) Techno First	Audi R8 LMS GT4 Evo	Audi DKAA 5.2 L V10	34	(Japan) Yuki Fujii	1–2, 4, 6–7
(Japan) Techno First	Audi R8 LMS GT4 Evo	Audi DKAA 5.2 L V10	34	(Japan) Riki Okusa	1–2, 4, 6–7
(Japan) Techno First	Audi R8 LMS GT4 Evo	Audi DKAA 5.2 L V10	34	(Japan) Hironobu Yasuda	1–2, 4, 6–7
(Japan) Techno First	Audi R8 LMS GT4 Evo	Audi DKAA 5.2 L V10	34	(Japan) Masaki Kano	1–2, 4, 6–7
(Japan) Birth Racing Project【BRP】	Toyota GR Supra GT4 Evo2	Toyota B58H 3.0 L Twin Turbo I6	51	(Japan) Noriyuki Higuchi	1–2, 4, 6–7
(Japan) Birth Racing Project【BRP】	Toyota GR Supra GT4 Evo2	Toyota B58H 3.0 L Twin Turbo I6	51	(Japan) Tatsuya Minowa	1–2, 4, 6–7
(Japan) Birth Racing Project【BRP】	Toyota GR Supra GT4 Evo2	Toyota B58H 3.0 L Twin Turbo I6	51	(Japan) Toshiyuki Ochiai	1–2, 4, 7
(Japan) Birth Racing Project【BRP】	Toyota GR Supra GT4 Evo2	Toyota B58H 3.0 L Twin Turbo I6	51	(Japan) Kiyohide Shirakihara	1–2, 6–7
(Japan) Birth Racing Project【BRP】	Toyota GR Supra GT4 Evo2	Toyota B58H 3.0 L Twin Turbo I6	51	(Japan) Shohei Oda	4
(Japan) Saitama Green Brave	Toyota GR Supra GT4 Evo2	Toyota B58H 3.0 L Twin-Turbo I6	52	(Japan) Hiroki Yoshida	1–4, 6–7
(Japan) Saitama Green Brave	Toyota GR Supra GT4 Evo2	Toyota B58H 3.0 L Twin-Turbo I6	52	(Japan) Naoki Hattori	1–4, 6–7
(Japan) Saitama Green Brave	Toyota GR Supra GT4 Evo2	Toyota B58H 3.0 L Twin-Turbo I6	52	(Japan) Seita Nonaka	1–4, 6–7
(Japan) Saitama Green Brave	Toyota GR Supra GT4 Evo2	Toyota B58H 3.0 L Twin-Turbo I6	52	(Japan) Manabu Yamazaki	1–4
(Japan) Saitama Green Brave	Toyota GR Supra GT4 Evo2	Toyota B58H 3.0 L Twin-Turbo I6	52	(Japan) Rin Arakawa	3
(Japan) Saitama Green Brave	Toyota GR Supra GT4 Evo2	Toyota B58H 3.0 L Twin-Turbo I6	52	(Japan) Kouta Matsui	6–7
(Japan) Progress Racing	Mercedes-AMG GT4	Mercedes-AMG M178 4.0 L V8	111	(Hong Kong) Andy Yan	1–4, 7
(Japan) Progress Racing	Mercedes-AMG GT4	Mercedes-AMG M178 4.0 L V8	111	(Hong Kong) Marchy Lee	1–3, 7
(Japan) Progress Racing	Mercedes-AMG GT4	Mercedes-AMG M178 4.0 L V8	111	(Japan) Daigo Saito	1, 4
(Japan) Progress Racing	Mercedes-AMG GT4	Mercedes-AMG M178 4.0 L V8	111	(Hong Kong) Andy Kwong	1, 4, 7
(Japan) Progress Racing	Mercedes-AMG GT4	Mercedes-AMG M178 4.0 L V8	111	(Hong Kong) Samuel Hsieh	2–3
(Japan) Progress Racing	Mercedes-AMG GT4	Mercedes-AMG M178 4.0 L V8	111	(Hong Kong) Aaron Kwong	3
(Japan) Progress Racing	Mercedes-AMG GT4	Mercedes-AMG M178 4.0 L V8	111	(China) Ho-Pin Tung	3
(Japan) Progress Racing	Mercedes-AMG GT4	Mercedes-AMG M178 4.0 L V8	111	(Hong Kong) Sunny Wong	3
(Japan) Progress Racing	Mercedes-AMG GT4	Mercedes-AMG M178 4.0 L V8	111	(Hong Kong) Rolly Sham	7
(China) Prime Racing	Toyota GR Supra GT4 Evo	Toyota B58H 3.0 L Twin-Turbo I6	315	(China) Wang Hao	2, 6
(China) Prime Racing	Toyota GR Supra GT4 Evo	Toyota B58H 3.0 L Twin-Turbo I6	315	(China) Han Lichao	2, 6
(China) Prime Racing	Toyota GR Supra GT4 Evo	Toyota B58H 3.0 L Twin-Turbo I6	315	(China) Shi Wei	2
(China) Prime Racing	Toyota GR Supra GT4 Evo	Toyota B58H 3.0 L Twin-Turbo I6	315	(China) Deng Yi	2
(China) Prime Racing	Toyota GR Supra GT4 Evo	Toyota B58H 3.0 L Twin-Turbo I6	315	(China) Huang Ruohan	6
(Japan) SHADE Racing	Toyota GR Supra GT4 Evo2	Toyota B58H 3.0 L Twin-Turbo I6	885	(Japan) Katsuyuki Hiranaka	1–4, 6–7
(Japan) SHADE Racing	Toyota GR Supra GT4 Evo2	Toyota B58H 3.0 L Twin-Turbo I6	885	(Japan) Yuji Kunimoto	1–4, 6–7
(Japan) SHADE Racing	Toyota GR Supra GT4 Evo2	Toyota B58H 3.0 L Twin-Turbo I6	885	(Japan) Yuki Sano	1–4, 6
(Japan) SHADE Racing	Toyota GR Supra GT4 Evo2	Toyota B58H 3.0 L Twin-Turbo I6	885	(Japan) "Hiro Hayashi"	1–2
(Japan) SHADE Racing	Toyota GR Supra GT4 Evo2	Toyota B58H 3.0 L Twin-Turbo I6	885	(Japan) Hironori Takeuchi	3–4, 6–7

=== ST-TCR ===
Team	Car	Engine	No.	Drivers	Rounds
(Japan) Birth Racing Project【BRP】	Cupra León TCR	Cupra DNPA 2.0 L Turbo I4	19	(Japan) Takashi Kochiya	1, 3–7
(Japan) Birth Racing Project【BRP】	Cupra León TCR	Cupra DNPA 2.0 L Turbo I4	19	(Japan) Takeshi Suehiro	1, 3–7
(Japan) Birth Racing Project【BRP】	Cupra León TCR	Cupra DNPA 2.0 L Turbo I4	19	(Japan) Jiei Okuzumi	1, 3–7
(Japan) Birth Racing Project【BRP】	Cupra León TCR	Cupra DNPA 2.0 L Turbo I4	19	(Japan) Takahisa Ohno	1, 3–5, 7
(Japan) Birth Racing Project【BRP】	Cupra León TCR	Cupra DNPA 2.0 L Turbo I4	19	(Japan) Taiga Imoto	3, 6
(Japan) Birth Racing Project【BRP】	Cupra León TCR	Cupra DNPA 2.0 L Turbo I4	19	(Japan) Hirokazu Okumura	3
(Japan) M&K Racing	Honda Civic Type R TCR (FL5)	Honda K20C1 2.0 L Turbo I4	96	(Japan) Koji Yamanishi	1, 4–7
(Japan) M&K Racing	Honda Civic Type R TCR (FL5)	Honda K20C1 2.0 L Turbo I4	96	(Japan) Yōsuke Yamaki	1, 4–7
(Japan) M&K Racing	Honda Civic Type R TCR (FL5)	Honda K20C1 2.0 L Turbo I4	96	(Japan) Osamu Kondo	1, 4, 6–7
(Japan) M&K Racing	Honda Civic Type R TCR (FL5)	Honda K20C1 2.0 L Turbo I4	96	(Thailand) Thanasiwanat Phongsinnatchaachun	5
(Japan) M&K Racing	Honda Civic Type R TCR (FL5)	Honda K20C1 2.0 L Turbo I4	96	(Thailand) Prapoj Chuenwichit	7
(Japan) M&K Racing	Honda Civic Type R TCR (FL5)	Honda K20C1 2.0 L Turbo I4	96	(Japan) Kento Omiya	5–6
(Japan) M&K Racing	Honda Civic Type R TCR (FL5)	Honda K20C1 2.0 L Turbo I4	97	(Japan) Kento Omiya	1, 4, 7
(Japan) M&K Racing	Honda Civic Type R TCR (FL5)	Honda K20C1 2.0 L Turbo I4	97	(Japan) Mitsuhiro Endō	1, 4–7
(Japan) M&K Racing	Honda Civic Type R TCR (FL5)	Honda K20C1 2.0 L Turbo I4	97	(Japan) Shinji Nakano	1, 4–7
(Japan) M&K Racing	Honda Civic Type R TCR (FL5)	Honda K20C1 2.0 L Turbo I4	97	(United Kingdom) Jack Young	1, 4–7
(Japan) Waimarama Racing	Hyundai Elantra N TCR (2024)	Hyundai G4KH 2.0 L Turbo I4	98	(Japan) Katsumasa Chiyo	1, 3–7
(Japan) Waimarama Racing	Hyundai Elantra N TCR (2024)	Hyundai G4KH 2.0 L Turbo I4	98	(South Korea) Lee Jung-woo	1, 3–7
(Japan) Waimarama Racing	Hyundai Elantra N TCR (2024)	Hyundai G4KH 2.0 L Turbo I4	98	(Japan) "Kizuna"	1, 3–5, 7
(Japan) Waimarama Racing	Hyundai Elantra N TCR (2024)	Hyundai G4KH 2.0 L Turbo I4	98	(Japan) Ryusuke Masumoto	3, 5–7
(Japan) Waimarama Racing	Hyundai Elantra N TCR (2024)	Hyundai G4KH 2.0 L Turbo I4	98	(Japan) Hironobu Yasuda	3
(Japan) Waimarama Racing	Hyundai Elantra N TCR (2024)	Hyundai G4KH 2.0 L Turbo I4	98	(France) Giuliano Alesi	3
(Japan) Audi Team Show Apex	Audi RS 3 LMS TCR (2017)	Audi CJX 2.0 L Turbo I4	430	(Japan) Genki Nishimura	1, 4–7
(Japan) Audi Team Show Apex	Audi RS 3 LMS TCR (2017)	Audi CJX 2.0 L Turbo I4	430	(Japan) Shigetomo Shimono	1, 4–7
(Japan) Audi Team Show Apex	Audi RS 3 LMS TCR (2017)	Audi CJX 2.0 L Turbo I4	430	(Japan) Takahiro Kimura	1, 4, 7
(Japan) Audi Team Show Apex	Audi RS 3 LMS TCR (2017)	Audi CJX 2.0 L Turbo I4	430	(Japan) Shozo Tagahara	1, 5–7
(Japan) Audi Team Show Apex	Audi RS 3 LMS TCR (2017)	Audi CJX 2.0 L Turbo I4	430	(Japan) Ryosuke Kagami	4
(Japan) Audi Team Show Apex	Audi RS 3 LMS TCR (2017)	Audi CJX 2.0 L Turbo I4	430	(Japan) Ryusho Konishi	5
(Japan) FET Racing	Honda Civic Type R TCR (FL5)	Honda K20C1 2.0 L Turbo I4	888	(Japan) Toshiro Tsukada	5, 7
(Japan) FET Racing	Honda Civic Type R TCR (FL5)	Honda K20C1 2.0 L Turbo I4	888	(Japan) Hiroshi Nakamura	5, 7
(Japan) FET Racing	Honda Civic Type R TCR (FL5)	Honda K20C1 2.0 L Turbo I4	888	(Japan) Kokoro Morita	5
(Japan) FET Racing	Honda Civic Type R TCR (FL5)	Honda K20C1 2.0 L Turbo I4	888	(Japan) Masafumi Omura	5
(Japan) FET Racing	Honda Civic Type R TCR (FL5)	Honda K20C1 2.0 L Turbo I4	888	(Japan) Kiyotaki Yuji	7

=== ST-Q ===
The ST-Q class uses development vehicles approved by the STO, similar to the ADAC NLS in Germany.

Team	Car	Engine	No.	Drivers	Rounds
(Japan) Mazda Spirit Racing	Mazda Roadster (NDERC) CNF Concept	Mazda Skyactiv-G PE-VPS 2.0 L I4	12	(Japan) Hiroshi Kawata	2–3, 6–7
(Japan) Mazda Spirit Racing	Mazda Roadster (NDERC) CNF Concept	Mazda Skyactiv-G PE-VPS 2.0 L I4	12	(Japan) Yuui Tsutsumi	2–3, 6–7
(Japan) Mazda Spirit Racing	Mazda Roadster (NDERC) CNF Concept	Mazda Skyactiv-G PE-VPS 2.0 L I4	12	(Japan) Yutaka Seki	2–3, 6–7
(Japan) Mazda Spirit Racing	Mazda Roadster (NDERC) CNF Concept	Mazda Skyactiv-G PE-VPS 2.0 L I4	12	(Japan) Ikuo Maeda	2
(Japan) Mazda Spirit Racing	Mazda Roadster (NDERC) CNF Concept	Mazda Skyactiv-G PE-VPS 2.0 L I4	12	(Japan) Takahiro Sato	3
(Japan) Mazda Spirit Racing	Mazda Roadster (NDERC) CNF Concept	Mazda Skyactiv-G PE-VPS 2.0 L I4	12	(Japan) Takuya Minowa	3
(Japan) Mazda Spirit Racing	Mazda3 Bio Concept	Mazda Skyactiv-D S8-DPTS 1.8 L I4	55	(Japan) Kazuhiro Terakawa	2–3, 7
(Japan) Mazda Spirit Racing	Mazda3 Bio Concept	Mazda Skyactiv-D S8-DPTS 1.8 L I4	55	(Japan) Ryohei Sakaguchi	2–3, 7
(Japan) Mazda Spirit Racing	Mazda3 Bio Concept	Mazda Skyactiv-D S8-DPTS 1.8 L I4	55	(Japan) Kaoru Ijiri	2–3, 7
(Japan) Mazda Spirit Racing	Mazda3 Bio Concept	Mazda Skyactiv-D S8-DPTS 1.8 L I4	55	(Japan) Ikuo Maeda	3, 7
(Japan) Mazda Spirit Racing	Mazda3 Bio Concept	Mazda Skyactiv-D S8-DPTS 1.8 L I4	55	(Japan) Shinichi Katsura	3
(Japan) TOYOTA GAZOO ROOKIE Racing	Toyota GR86 CNF Concept	Toyota G16E-GTS 1.4 L Turbo I3	28	(Japan) Daisuke Toyoda	3, 5–7
(Japan) TOYOTA GAZOO ROOKIE Racing	Toyota GR86 CNF Concept	Toyota G16E-GTS 1.4 L Turbo I3	28	(Japan) Sho Tsuboi	3, 5–7
(Japan) TOYOTA GAZOO ROOKIE Racing	Toyota GR86 CNF Concept	Toyota G16E-GTS 1.4 L Turbo I3	28	(Japan) Eisuke Sasaki	3, 5–7
(Japan) TOYOTA GAZOO ROOKIE Racing	Toyota GR86 CNF Concept	Toyota G16E-GTS 1.4 L Turbo I3	28	(Japan) Nirei Fukuzumi	3, 5
(Japan) TOYOTA GAZOO ROOKIE Racing	Toyota GR86 CNF Concept	Toyota G16E-GTS 1.4 L Turbo I3	28	(Japan) Kazuya Oshima	3, 6–7
(Japan) TOYOTA GAZOO ROOKIE Racing	Toyota GR86 CNF Concept	Toyota G16E-GTS 1.4 L Turbo I3	28	(Japan) Aimi Saito	3
(Japan) TOYOTA GAZOO ROOKIE Racing	Toyota GR Corolla H2 Concept (Rd. 3 & 7); Toyota GR Yaris M Concept (Rd. 5 & 6)	Toyota G16E-GTS 1.6 L Turbo I3; Toyota G20E 2.0 L Turbo I4	32	(Japan) "Morizo"	3, 5–7
(Japan) TOYOTA GAZOO ROOKIE Racing	Toyota GR Corolla H2 Concept (Rd. 3 & 7); Toyota GR Yaris M Concept (Rd. 5 & 6)	Toyota G16E-GTS 1.6 L Turbo I3; Toyota G20E 2.0 L Turbo I4	32	(Japan) Yasuhiro Ogura	3, 5–7
(Japan) TOYOTA GAZOO ROOKIE Racing	Toyota GR Corolla H2 Concept (Rd. 3 & 7); Toyota GR Yaris M Concept (Rd. 5 & 6)	Toyota G16E-GTS 1.6 L Turbo I3; Toyota G20E 2.0 L Turbo I4	32	(Japan) Masahiro Sasaki	3, 5–7
(Japan) TOYOTA GAZOO ROOKIE Racing	Toyota GR Corolla H2 Concept (Rd. 3 & 7); Toyota GR Yaris M Concept (Rd. 5 & 6)	Toyota G16E-GTS 1.6 L Turbo I3; Toyota G20E 2.0 L Turbo I4	32	(Japan) Hiroaki Ishiura	3, 5–7
(Japan) TOYOTA GAZOO ROOKIE Racing	Toyota GR Corolla H2 Concept (Rd. 3 & 7); Toyota GR Yaris M Concept (Rd. 5 & 6)	Toyota G16E-GTS 1.6 L Turbo I3; Toyota G20E 2.0 L Turbo I4	32	(Japan) Mako Hirakawa	3
(Japan) TOYOTA GAZOO ROOKIE Racing	Toyota GR Corolla H2 Concept (Rd. 3 & 7); Toyota GR Yaris M Concept (Rd. 5 & 6)	Toyota G16E-GTS 1.6 L Turbo I3; Toyota G20E 2.0 L Turbo I4	32	(Japan) Kazuki Nakajima	3
(Japan) Team SDA Engineering	Subaru High Performance X Future Concept	Subaru FA24 2.4 L Turbo F4	61	(Japan) Kazuhiro Ito	2–4, 7
(Japan) Team SDA Engineering	Subaru High Performance X Future Concept	Subaru FA24 2.4 L Turbo F4	61	(Japan) Hideki Yamauchi	2–4, 7
(Japan) Team SDA Engineering	Subaru High Performance X Future Concept	Subaru FA24 2.4 L Turbo F4	61	(Japan) Takuto Iguchi	2–4, 7
(Japan) Team SDA Engineering	Subaru High Performance X Future Concept	Subaru FA24 2.4 L Turbo F4	61	(Japan) Masafumi Hanazawa	2–4, 7
(Japan) Team SDA Engineering	Subaru High Performance X Future Concept	Subaru FA24 2.4 L Turbo F4	61	(Japan) Sususmu Ito	3
(Japan) GR Team Spirit	Toyota GR Yaris DAT Racing Concept	Toyota G20E 2.0 L Turbo I4	104	(Japan) Kazuhiko Omasa	1–3, 5–7
(Japan) GR Team Spirit	Toyota GR Yaris DAT Racing Concept	Toyota G20E 2.0 L Turbo I4	104	(Japan) Kenta Yamashita	1–3, 5–7
(Japan) GR Team Spirit	Toyota GR Yaris DAT Racing Concept	Toyota G20E 2.0 L Turbo I4	104	(Japan) Shunsuke Kohno	1–3
(Japan) GR Team Spirit	Toyota GR Yaris DAT Racing Concept	Toyota G20E 2.0 L Turbo I4	104	(Japan) Takamitsu Matsui	1, 3, 5–7
(Japan) GR Team Spirit	Toyota GR Yaris DAT Racing Concept	Toyota G20E 2.0 L Turbo I4	104	(Japan) Yuichi Nakayama	2–3, 5–7
(Japan) GR Team Spirit	Toyota GR Yaris DAT Racing Concept	Toyota G20E 2.0 L Turbo I4	104	(Japan) Ryuta Ukai	3
(Japan) NISMO	Nissan Z Racing Concept	Nissan VR30DDTT 3.0 L Twin-Turbo V6	230	(Japan) Kohei Hirate	7
(Japan) NISMO	Nissan Z Racing Concept	Nissan VR30DDTT 3.0 L Twin-Turbo V6	230	(Japan) Daiki Sasaki	7
(Japan) NISMO	Nissan Z Racing Concept	Nissan VR30DDTT 3.0 L Twin-Turbo V6	230	(Japan) Atsushi Miyake	7
(Japan) Team HRC	Honda Civic Type R HRC Concept	Honda HRC-K20C 2.0 L Turbo I4	271	(Japan) Hiroki Otsu	5–7
(Japan) Team HRC	Honda Civic Type R HRC Concept	Honda HRC-K20C 2.0 L Turbo I4	271	(Japan) Yuto Nomura	5–7
(Japan) Team HRC	Honda Civic Type R HRC Concept	Honda HRC-K20C 2.0 L Turbo I4	271	(Japan) Shion Tsujimoto	5–7

=== ST-USA (American produced cars) ===
Team	Car	Engine	No.	Drivers	Rounds
USA-1 (GT3)
(Japan) Bingo Racing	Callaway Corvette C7 GT3-R	Chevrolet LT1 6.2 L V8	9	(Japan) Shinji Takei	7
(Japan) Bingo Racing	Callaway Corvette C7 GT3-R	Chevrolet LT1 6.2 L V8	9	(Japan) Ukyo Sasahara	7
(Japan) Bingo Racing	Callaway Corvette C7 GT3-R	Chevrolet LT1 6.2 L V8	9	(Japan) Sena Sakaguchi	7
USA-2 (GTC)
(United States) TechSport Racing	Ford Mustang Dark Horse R	Ford Coyote 5.0 L V8	249	(United States) Devin Anderson	7
(United States) TechSport Racing	Ford Mustang Dark Horse R	Ford Coyote 5.0 L V8	249	(France) Giuliano Alesi	7
(United States) TechSport Racing	Ford Mustang Dark Horse R	Ford Coyote 5.0 L V8	249	(Japan) Kazuki Nakajima	7

=== ST-1 (GTC cars) ===
Team	Car	Engine	No.	Drivers	Rounds
(Japan) K's Frontier KTM Cars	KTM X-Bow GTX	Audi DNWA 2.5 L I5	2	(Japan) Taiyo Ida	1–4, 6–7
(Japan) K's Frontier KTM Cars	KTM X-Bow GTX	Audi DNWA 2.5 L I5	2	(Japan) Hiroki Katoh	1–4, 6–7
(Japan) K's Frontier KTM Cars	KTM X-Bow GTX	Audi DNWA 2.5 L I5	2	(Japan) Kazuho Takahashi	1–4, 6–7
(Japan) K's Frontier KTM Cars	KTM X-Bow GTX	Audi DNWA 2.5 L I5	2	(Japan) Hiroki Yoshimoto	1–4, 6–7
(Japan) K's Frontier KTM Cars	KTM X-Bow GTX	Audi DNWA 2.5 L I5	2	(Japan) Takashi Kobayashi	3
(Japan) D'station Racing	Porsche 911 GT3 Cup (992)	Porsche M97/80 4.0 L F6	47	(Japan) Kenji Hama	1–4, 6–7
(Japan) D'station Racing	Porsche 911 GT3 Cup (992)	Porsche M97/80 4.0 L F6	47	(Japan) Tatsuya Hoshino	1–4, 6–7
(Japan) D'station Racing	Porsche 911 GT3 Cup (992)	Porsche M97/80 4.0 L F6	47	(Japan) Tetsuya Tanaka	1–4, 6–7
(Japan) D'station Racing	Porsche 911 GT3 Cup (992)	Porsche M97/80 4.0 L F6	47	(Japan) Taiga Kabaki	1–4, 6–7
(Japan) D'station Racing	Porsche 911 GT3 Cup (992)	Porsche M97/80 4.0 L F6	47	(Japan) Satoshi Hoshino	3
(Japan) D'station Racing	Porsche 911 GT3 Cup (992)	Porsche M97/80 4.0 L F6	47	(Japan) Yuta Kamimura	3

=== ST-2 ===
2,400–3,500cc, front-wheel and all-wheel drive vehicles

Team	Car	Engine	No.	Drivers	Rounds
(Japan) Shinryo Racing Team	Mitsubishi Lancer Evolution X (CZ4A)	Mitsubishi 4B11T 2.0 L Turbo I4	6	(Japan) Tomohiro Tomimasu	1, 3–7
(Japan) Shinryo Racing Team	Mitsubishi Lancer Evolution X (CZ4A)	Mitsubishi 4B11T 2.0 L Turbo I4	6	(Japan) Yasushi Kikuchi	1, 3–7
(Japan) Shinryo Racing Team	Mitsubishi Lancer Evolution X (CZ4A)	Mitsubishi 4B11T 2.0 L Turbo I4	6	(Japan) Masazumi Ohashi	1, 3–7
(Japan) Shinryo Racing Team	Mitsubishi Lancer Evolution X (CZ4A)	Mitsubishi 4B11T 2.0 L Turbo I4	6	(Japan) Takahiro Matsuzawa	1, 3–7
(Japan) Shinryo Racing Team	Mitsubishi Lancer Evolution X (CZ4A)	Mitsubishi 4B11T 2.0 L Turbo I4	6	(Japan) Turbo Asahi	3
(Japan) Shinryo Racing Team	Mitsubishi Lancer Evolution X (CZ4A)	Mitsubishi 4B11T 2.0 L Turbo I4	7	(Japan) Hitoshi Gotoh	1, 3, 5–7
(Japan) Shinryo Racing Team	Mitsubishi Lancer Evolution X (CZ4A)	Mitsubishi 4B11T 2.0 L Turbo I4	7	(Japan) Hisahiko Usui	1, 3, 5–7
(Japan) Shinryo Racing Team	Mitsubishi Lancer Evolution X (CZ4A)	Mitsubishi 4B11T 2.0 L Turbo I4	7	(Japan) Keisuke Anzai	1, 3, 5–7
(Japan) Shinryo Racing Team	Mitsubishi Lancer Evolution X (CZ4A)	Mitsubishi 4B11T 2.0 L Turbo I4	7	(Japan) Kazunari Yoshioka	1, 3, 5–7
(Japan) Shinryo Racing Team	Mitsubishi Lancer Evolution X (CZ4A)	Mitsubishi 4B11T 2.0 L Turbo I4	7	(Japan) Tatsuya Okahara	3
(Japan) Shinryo Racing Team	Mitsubishi Lancer Evolution X (CZ4A)	Mitsubishi 4B11T 2.0 L Turbo I4	7	(Japan) Kazuaki Kimura	3
(Japan) Endless Sports	Toyota GR Yaris (GXPA16)	Toyota G16E-GTS 1.6 L Turbo I3	13	(Japan) Masaya Hanazato	1, 3–7
(Japan) Endless Sports	Toyota GR Yaris (GXPA16)	Toyota G16E-GTS 1.6 L Turbo I3	13	(Japan) Mizuki Ishizaka	1, 3–7
(Japan) Endless Sports	Toyota GR Yaris (GXPA16)	Toyota G16E-GTS 1.6 L Turbo I3	13	(Japan) Reimei Ito	1, 3–7
(Japan) Endless Sports	Toyota GR Yaris (GXPA16)	Toyota G16E-GTS 1.6 L Turbo I3	13	(Japan) Hitoshi Okada	1, 3–7
(Japan) HCM Uchino Racing	Honda Civic Type R (FL5)	Honda K20C1 2.0 L Turbo I4	36	(Japan) Hirokazu Iwama	1, 3, 5–7
(Japan) HCM Uchino Racing	Honda Civic Type R (FL5)	Honda K20C1 2.0 L Turbo I4	36	(Japan) Jun Doi	1, 3, 5–7
(Japan) HCM Uchino Racing	Honda Civic Type R (FL5)	Honda K20C1 2.0 L Turbo I4	36	(Japan) Toshijiro Akutsu	1, 3, 5, 7
(Japan) HCM Uchino Racing	Honda Civic Type R (FL5)	Honda K20C1 2.0 L Turbo I4	36	(Japan) Noriaki Uchino	3, 5
(Japan) HCM Uchino Racing	Honda Civic Type R (FL5)	Honda K20C1 2.0 L Turbo I4	36	(Japan) Yasunori Matsumoto	3
(Japan) HCM Uchino Racing	Honda Civic Type R (FL5)	Honda K20C1 2.0 L Turbo I4	36	(Japan) Takuto Sakai	3
(Japan) Nihon Automobile College	Honda Civic Type R (FL5)	Honda K20C1 2.0 L Turbo I4	72	(Japan) Makoto Kanai	1, 3–7
(Japan) Nihon Automobile College	Honda Civic Type R (FL5)	Honda K20C1 2.0 L Turbo I4	72	(Japan) Tetsuya Yamano	1, 3–7
(Japan) Nihon Automobile College	Honda Civic Type R (FL5)	Honda K20C1 2.0 L Turbo I4	72	(Japan) Toshiya Nojima	1, 3–7
(Japan) Nihon Automobile College	Honda Civic Type R (FL5)	Honda K20C1 2.0 L Turbo I4	72	(Japan) Ippei Yamazaki	3–4
(Japan) Nihon Automobile College	Honda Civic Type R (FL5)	Honda K20C1 2.0 L Turbo I4	72	(Japan) Hiroki Otsu	3
(Japan) Team Spoon	Honda Civic Type R (FL5)	Honda K20C1 2.0 L Turbo I4	95	(Japan) Eiji Yamada	1, 3–7
(Japan) Team Spoon	Honda Civic Type R (FL5)	Honda K20C1 2.0 L Turbo I4	95	(Japan) Syun Koide	1, 3–7
(Japan) Team Spoon	Honda Civic Type R (FL5)	Honda K20C1 2.0 L Turbo I4	95	(Japan) Kazuma Nishimura	1, 3–7
(Japan) Team Spoon	Honda Civic Type R (FL5)	Honda K20C1 2.0 L Turbo I4	95	(Japan) Yusuke Mitsui	3
(Japan) Team Spoon	Honda Civic Type R (FL5)	Honda K20C1 2.0 L Turbo I4	95	(Japan) Taketoshi Matsui	3
(Japan) Team Spoon	Honda Civic Type R (FL5)	Honda K20C1 2.0 L Turbo I4	95	(Japan) Yasunori Nakajima	3
(Japan) KTMS	Toyota GR Yaris (GXPA16)	Toyota G16E-GTS 1.6 L Turbo I3	225	(Japan) Riona Tomishita	1, 3–7
(Japan) KTMS	Toyota GR Yaris (GXPA16)	Toyota G16E-GTS 1.6 L Turbo I3	225	(Japan) Hibiki Taira	1, 3–7
(Japan) KTMS	Toyota GR Yaris (GXPA16)	Toyota G16E-GTS 1.6 L Turbo I3	225	(Japan) Tokiya Suzuki	1, 3–6
(Japan) KTMS	Toyota GR Yaris (GXPA16)	Toyota G16E-GTS 1.6 L Turbo I3	225	(Japan) Rin Arakawa	7
(Japan) Honda R&D Challenge	Honda Civic Type R (FL5)	Honda K20C1 2.0 L Turbo I4	743	(Japan) Hiroki Ishigaki	1, 3–7
(Japan) Honda R&D Challenge	Honda Civic Type R (FL5)	Honda K20C1 2.0 L Turbo I4	743	(Japan) Akira Bitoh	1, 3–7
(Japan) Honda R&D Challenge	Honda Civic Type R (FL5)	Honda K20C1 2.0 L Turbo I4	743	(Japan) Junichi Kidachi	1, 3–7
(Japan) Honda R&D Challenge	Honda Civic Type R (FL5)	Honda K20C1 2.0 L Turbo I4	743	(Japan) Hideki Kakinuma	1, 3–4
(Japan) Honda R&D Challenge	Honda Civic Type R (FL5)	Honda K20C1 2.0 L Turbo I4	743	(Japan) Tomoki Nojiri	3
(Japan) Honda R&D Challenge	Honda Civic Type R (FL5)	Honda K20C1 2.0 L Turbo I4	743	(Japan) Tensho Kobayashi	5–6

=== ST-3 ===
2,400–3,500cc, rear-wheel drive vehicles

Team	Car	Engine	No.	Drivers	Rounds
(Japan) Okabe Jidosha Motorsport	Nissan Fairlady Z (Z34)	Nissan VQ37VHR 3.7 L V6	15	(Japan) Shuji Maejima	1–3, 5–7
(Japan) Okabe Jidosha Motorsport	Nissan Fairlady Z (Z34)	Nissan VQ37VHR 3.7 L V6	15	(Japan) Masaaki Nagashima	1–3, 5–7
(Japan) Okabe Jidosha Motorsport	Nissan Fairlady Z (Z34)	Nissan VQ37VHR 3.7 L V6	15	(Japan) Tsubasa Mekaru	1–3, 5–7
(Japan) Okabe Jidosha Motorsport	Nissan Fairlady Z (Z34)	Nissan VQ37VHR 3.7 L V6	15	(Japan) Seiya Motojima	1–2, 5
(Japan) Okabe Jidosha Motorsport	Nissan Fairlady Z (Z34)	Nissan VQ37VHR 3.7 L V6	15	(Japan) Jun Tashiro	3
(Japan) Okabe Jidosha Motorsport	Nissan Fairlady Z (Z34)	Nissan VQ37VHR 3.7 L V6	15	(Japan) Yuya Nakajima	3
(Japan) Okabe Jidosha Motorsport	Nissan Fairlady Z (Z34)	Nissan VQ37VHR 3.7 L V6	16	(Japan) Toru Tanaka	1–3, 5–7
(Japan) Okabe Jidosha Motorsport	Nissan Fairlady Z (Z34)	Nissan VQ37VHR 3.7 L V6	16	(Japan) Hironobu Shimizu	1–3, 5–7
(Japan) Okabe Jidosha Motorsport	Nissan Fairlady Z (Z34)	Nissan VQ37VHR 3.7 L V6	16	(Japan) Hibiki Komatsu	1–3, 5–7
(Japan) Okabe Jidosha Motorsport	Nissan Fairlady Z (Z34)	Nissan VQ37VHR 3.7 L V6	16	(Japan) Atsushi Miyake	1–3, 5–6
(Japan) Okabe Jidosha Motorsport	Nissan Fairlady Z (Z34)	Nissan VQ37VHR 3.7 L V6	16	(Japan) Kazuomi Komatsu	3
(Japan) Okabe Jidosha Motorsport	Nissan Fairlady Z (Z34)	Nissan VQ37VHR 3.7 L V6	16	(Japan) Masaya Kono	3
(Japan) Tracy Sports with Delta	Lexus RC 350 (GSC10)	Lexus 2GR-FKS 3.5 L V6	38	(Japan) Yohei Maruyama	1–3, 5–7
(Japan) Tracy Sports with Delta	Lexus RC 350 (GSC10)	Lexus 2GR-FKS 3.5 L V6	38	(Japan) Tomohiro Hayashi	1–3, 5–7
(Japan) Tracy Sports with Delta	Lexus RC 350 (GSC10)	Lexus 2GR-FKS 3.5 L V6	38	(Japan) Shingo Imai	1–3, 7
(Japan) Tracy Sports with Delta	Lexus RC 350 (GSC10)	Lexus 2GR-FKS 3.5 L V6	38	(Japan) Yoshinari Fujiwara	1, 3
(Japan) Tracy Sports with Delta	Lexus RC 350 (GSC10)	Lexus 2GR-FKS 3.5 L V6	38	(Japan) Kazuya Yasuda	5–6
(Japan) Tracy Sports with Delta	Lexus RC 350 (GSC10)	Lexus 2GR-FKS 3.5 L V6	38	(Japan) Yohei Ono	3
(Japan) Tracy Sports with Delta	Lexus RC 350 (GSC10)	Lexus 2GR-FKS 3.5 L V6	38	(Japan) Toshiyuki Takahashi	3
(Japan) Tracy Sports with Delta	Lexus RC 350 (GSC10)	Lexus 2GR-FKS 3.5 L V6	39	(Japan) Shinya Fujita	1–3, 5–7
(Japan) Tracy Sports with Delta	Lexus RC 350 (GSC10)	Lexus 2GR-FKS 3.5 L V6	39	(Japan) Takumi Sanada	1–3, 5–7
(Japan) Tracy Sports with Delta	Lexus RC 350 (GSC10)	Lexus 2GR-FKS 3.5 L V6	39	(Japan) Takashi Ito	1–3, 5–7
(Japan) Tracy Sports with Delta	Lexus RC 350 (GSC10)	Lexus 2GR-FKS 3.5 L V6	39	(Japan) Takuya Otaki	3
(Japan) Tracy Sports with Delta	Lexus RC 350 (GSC10)	Lexus 2GR-FKS 3.5 L V6	39	(Japan) Ren Takahashi	3

=== ST-4 ===
1,500–2,500cc vehicles

Team	Car	Engine	No.	Drivers	Rounds
(Japan) Endless Sports	Toyota GR86 (ZN8)	Toyota FA24D 2.4 L F4	3	(Japan) Hiroyuki Saka	1–3, 5, 7
(Japan) Endless Sports	Toyota GR86 (ZN8)	Toyota FA24D 2.4 L F4	3	(Japan) Togo Suganami	1–3, 5, 7
(Japan) Endless Sports	Toyota GR86 (ZN8)	Toyota FA24D 2.4 L F4	3	(Japan) Ryo Ogawa	1–3, 5, 7
(Japan) Endless Sports	Toyota GR86 (ZN8)	Toyota FA24D 2.4 L F4	3	(Japan) Atsushi Shimaya	2–3, 5, 7
(Japan) Asano Racing Service	Toyota GR86 (ZN8)	Toyota FA24D 2.4 L F4	18	(Japan) Takeo Asano	1–3, 5, 7
(Japan) Asano Racing Service	Toyota GR86 (ZN8)	Toyota FA24D 2.4 L F4	18	(Japan) Shinnosuke Ito	1–3, 5, 7
(Japan) Asano Racing Service	Toyota GR86 (ZN8)	Toyota FA24D 2.4 L F4	18	(Japan) Kazumi Mikami	1–3, 5, 7
(Japan) Asano Racing Service	Toyota GR86 (ZN8)	Toyota FA24D 2.4 L F4	18	(Japan) Daiki Fujiwara	1–3, 5, 7
(Japan) Asano Racing Service	Toyota GR86 (ZN8)	Toyota FA24D 2.4 L F4	18	(Japan) Toshikazu Shiba	3
(Japan) Asano Racing Service	Toyota GR86 (ZN8)	Toyota FA24D 2.4 L F4	18	(Japan) Takafumi Kondo	3
(Japan) Team NOPRO	Mazda Roadster (NC)	Mazda MZR LF-VE 2.0 L I4	37	(Japan) Johnny Ogura	1–3, 5, 7
(Japan) Team NOPRO	Mazda Roadster (NC)	Mazda MZR LF-VE 2.0 L I4	37	(Japan) Tobio Otani	1–3, 5, 7
(Japan) Team NOPRO	Mazda Roadster (NC)	Mazda MZR LF-VE 2.0 L I4	37	(Japan) Toshihiko Nogami	1–3, 5, 7
(Japan) Team NOPRO	Mazda Roadster (NC)	Mazda MZR LF-VE 2.0 L I4	37	(Japan) Tatsuya Nogami	1, 3
(Japan) Team NOPRO	Mazda Roadster (NC)	Mazda MZR LF-VE 2.0 L I4	37	(Japan) Ryu Yamamoto	2–3
(Japan) Team NOPRO	Mazda Roadster (NC)	Mazda MZR LF-VE 2.0 L I4	37	(Japan) Tatsuya Tanigawa	3
(Japan) Tracy Sports With Delta	Toyota GR86 (ZN8)	Toyota FA24D 2.4 L F4	41	(Japan) Hirotaka Ishii	1–3, 5, 7
(Japan) Tracy Sports With Delta	Toyota GR86 (ZN8)	Toyota FA24D 2.4 L F4	41	(Japan) Yusuke Tomibayashi	1–3, 5, 7
(Japan) Tracy Sports With Delta	Toyota GR86 (ZN8)	Toyota FA24D 2.4 L F4	41	(Japan) Shunsuke Ozaki	1–3, 5, 7
(Japan) Tracy Sports With Delta	Toyota GR86 (ZN8)	Toyota FA24D 2.4 L F4	41	(Japan) Daichi Okamoto	3
(Japan) Tracy Sports With Delta	Toyota GR86 (ZN8)	Toyota FA24D 2.4 L F4	41	(Japan) Dai Mizuno	3
(Japan) Zenyaku With Team G/Motion'	Toyota GR86 (ZN8)	Toyota FA24D 2.4 L F4	60	(Japan) Resshu Shioya	1–3, 5, 7
(Japan) Zenyaku With Team G/Motion'	Toyota GR86 (ZN8)	Toyota FA24D 2.4 L F4	60	(Japan) Keisuke Ohara	1–3, 5, 7
(Japan) Zenyaku With Team G/Motion'	Toyota GR86 (ZN8)	Toyota FA24D 2.4 L F4	60	(Japan) Masayuki Minato	1–3, 5, 7
(Japan) Zenyaku With Team G/Motion'	Toyota GR86 (ZN8)	Toyota FA24D 2.4 L F4	60	(Japan) Takumi Umehara	1–3, 5
(Japan) Zenyaku With Team G/Motion'	Toyota GR86 (ZN8)	Toyota FA24D 2.4 L F4	60	(Japan) Shun Ito	3
(Japan) Over Drive	Mazda Roadster RF (NDERC)	Mazda Skyactiv-G PE-VPS 2.0 L I4	66	(Japan) Kyousuke Inomata	1–3, 5, 7
(Japan) Over Drive	Mazda Roadster RF (NDERC)	Mazda Skyactiv-G PE-VPS 2.0 L I4	66	(Japan) Kohei Tokumasu	1–3, 5, 7
(Japan) Over Drive	Mazda Roadster RF (NDERC)	Mazda Skyactiv-G PE-VPS 2.0 L I4	66	(Japan) Yuta Fujiwara	1–3, 5
(Japan) Over Drive	Mazda Roadster RF (NDERC)	Mazda Skyactiv-G PE-VPS 2.0 L I4	66	(Japan) Ryohei Yamaichi	1, 3
(Japan) Over Drive	Mazda Roadster RF (NDERC)	Mazda Skyactiv-G PE-VPS 2.0 L I4	66	(Japan) Takuma Ikeda	3, 7
(Japan) Over Drive	Mazda Roadster RF (NDERC)	Mazda Skyactiv-G PE-VPS 2.0 L I4	66	(Japan) Hiyu Ikeuchi	3
(Japan) Over Drive	Mazda Roadster RF (NDERC)	Mazda Skyactiv-G PE-VPS 2.0 L I4	66	(Japan) Kunihiro Miyazaki	7
(Japan) HMR Racing	Toyota GR86 (ZN8)	Toyota FA24D 2.4 L F4	216	(Japan) Kota Sasaki	1–3, 7
(Japan) HMR Racing	Toyota GR86 (ZN8)	Toyota FA24D 2.4 L F4	216	(Japan) "Ishiken"	1–2, 7
(Japan) HMR Racing	Toyota GR86 (ZN8)	Toyota FA24D 2.4 L F4	216	(Japan) Toshiki Ishimori	1–2, 7
(Japan) HMR Racing	Toyota GR86 (ZN8)	Toyota FA24D 2.4 L F4	216	(Japan) "Naoryu"	3
(Japan) HMR Racing	Toyota GR86 (ZN8)	Toyota FA24D 2.4 L F4	216	(Japan) "Kenbow"	3
(Japan) HMR Racing	Toyota GR86 (ZN8)	Toyota FA24D 2.4 L F4	216	(Japan) Toshihito Funai	3
(Japan) HMR Racing	Toyota GR86 (ZN8)	Toyota FA24D 2.4 L F4	216	(Japan) Tetsuya Moriyama	3
(Japan) HMR Racing	Toyota GR86 (ZN8)	Toyota FA24D 2.4 L F4	216	(Japan) Kosuke Ito	3
(Japan) AutoLabo	Suzuki Swift Sport (ZC33S)	Suzuki K14C 1.4 L Turbo I4	290	(Japan) Yuichi Yoko	1–3, 5, 7
(Japan) AutoLabo	Suzuki Swift Sport (ZC33S)	Suzuki K14C 1.4 L Turbo I4	290	(Japan) Daisuke Ito	1–3, 5, 7
(Japan) AutoLabo	Suzuki Swift Sport (ZC33S)	Suzuki K14C 1.4 L Turbo I4	290	(Japan) Kazunori Nishimura	1–3, 5, 7
(Japan) AutoLabo	Suzuki Swift Sport (ZC33S)	Suzuki K14C 1.4 L Turbo I4	290	(Japan) Natsuki Obi	2–3
(Japan) AutoLabo	Suzuki Swift Sport (ZC33S)	Suzuki K14C 1.4 L Turbo I4	290	(Japan) Sera Tomita	3
(Japan) AutoLabo	Suzuki Swift Sport (ZC33S)	Suzuki K14C 1.4 L Turbo I4	290	(Japan) Naozumi Saka	3
(Japan) SHADE Racing	Toyota GR86 (ZN8)	Toyota FA24D 2.4 L F4	884	(Japan) Masahiko Kageyama	1–3, 5, 7
(Japan) SHADE Racing	Toyota GR86 (ZN8)	Toyota FA24D 2.4 L F4	884	(Japan) Eijiro Shimizu	1–3, 5, 7
(Japan) SHADE Racing	Toyota GR86 (ZN8)	Toyota FA24D 2.4 L F4	884	(Japan) Shinnosuke Yamada	1–3, 5, 7
(Japan) SHADE Racing	Toyota GR86 (ZN8)	Toyota FA24D 2.4 L F4	884	(Japan) Morio Nitta	3, 5

=== ST-5 ===
Team	Car	Engine	No.	Drivers	Rounds
5F (1,500cc and below with front wheel drive.)
(Japan) Team Bride	Honda Fit4 RS (GS4)	Honda L15ZF 1.5 L I4	4	(Japan) Yuya Ohta	1–6
(Japan) Team Bride	Honda Fit4 RS (GS4)	Honda L15ZF 1.5 L I4	4	(Japan) Kaoru Arai	1–6
(Japan) Team Bride	Honda Fit4 RS (GS4)	Honda L15ZF 1.5 L I4	4	(Japan) Takao Seto	1–6
(Japan) Team Bride	Honda Fit4 RS (GS4)	Honda L15ZF 1.5 L I4	4	(Japan) Kuniyuki Haga	1, 3–4
(Japan) Team Bride	Honda Fit4 RS (GS4)	Honda L15ZF 1.5 L I4	4	(Japan) Yoshikazu Sabu	2–3, 5
(Japan) Team Bride	Honda Fit4 RS (GS4)	Honda L15ZF 1.5 L I4	4	(Japan) Shunya Ito	3
(Japan) Sakae Motor Sports	Honda Fit3 RS (GK5)	Honda L15B 1.5 L I4	11	(Japan) Ryohei Oshima	1–6
(Japan) Sakae Motor Sports	Honda Fit3 RS (GK5)	Honda L15B 1.5 L I4	11	(Japan) Hidenori Miwa	1–6
(Japan) Sakae Motor Sports	Honda Fit3 RS (GK5)	Honda L15B 1.5 L I4	11	(Japan) Hajime Omono	1–5
(Japan) Sakae Motor Sports	Honda Fit3 RS (GK5)	Honda L15B 1.5 L I4	11	(Japan) Masaharu Nishioka	1, 3–4
(Japan) Sakae Motor Sports	Honda Fit3 RS (GK5)	Honda L15B 1.5 L I4	11	(Japan) Piston Nishizawa	2–3, 6
(Japan) Sakae Motor Sports	Honda Fit3 RS (GK5)	Honda L15B 1.5 L I4	11	(Japan) Ryuichi Furuido	3
(Japan) Sakae Motor Sports	Honda Fit3 RS (GK5)	Honda L15B 1.5 L I4	11	(Japan) Ryoji Tashiro	5
(Japan) Team NOPRO	Mazda2 Diesel Turbo (DJ5FS)	Mazda Skyactiv-D S5-DPTS 1.5 L Turbo I4	17	(Japan) Yoshihiro Kato	1–5
(Japan) Team NOPRO	Mazda2 Diesel Turbo (DJ5FS)	Mazda Skyactiv-D S5-DPTS 1.5 L Turbo I4	17	(Japan) Misaki Konishi	1–5
(Japan) Team NOPRO	Mazda2 Diesel Turbo (DJ5FS)	Mazda Skyactiv-D S5-DPTS 1.5 L Turbo I4	17	(Japan) Hiroaki Yamamoto	1–3, 5
(Japan) Team NOPRO	Mazda2 Diesel Turbo (DJ5FS)	Mazda Skyactiv-D S5-DPTS 1.5 L Turbo I4	17	(Japan) Suguru Kawana	1
(Japan) Team NOPRO	Mazda2 Diesel Turbo (DJ5FS)	Mazda Skyactiv-D S5-DPTS 1.5 L Turbo I4	17	(Japan) Masataka Inoue	3
(Japan) Team NOPRO	Mazda2 Diesel Turbo (DJ5FS)	Mazda Skyactiv-D S5-DPTS 1.5 L Turbo I4	17	(Japan) Osamu Kondo	3
(Japan) Team NOPRO	Mazda2 Diesel Turbo (DJ5FS)	Mazda Skyactiv-D S5-DPTS 1.5 L Turbo I4	17	(Japan) Takashi Ōi	3
(Japan) Team NOPRO	Mazda2 Diesel Turbo (DJ5FS)	Mazda Skyactiv-D S5-DPTS 1.5 L Turbo I4	17	(Japan) Tobio Ohtani	4
(Japan) Team NOPRO	Mazda2 Diesel Turbo (DJ5FS)	Mazda Skyactiv-D S5-DPTS 1.5 L Turbo I4	17	(Japan) Tatsuya Nogami	5
(Japan) Team Yamato	Honda Fit3 RS (GK5)	Honda L15ZF 1.5 L I4	67	(Japan) Ryohei Yasui	1–6
(Japan) Team Yamato	Honda Fit3 RS (GK5)	Honda L15ZF 1.5 L I4	67	(Japan) Shinya Uchiyama	1–6
(Japan) Team Yamato	Honda Fit3 RS (GK5)	Honda L15ZF 1.5 L I4	67	(Japan) Ryo Mukumoto	1–6
(Japan) Team Yamato	Honda Fit3 RS (GK5)	Honda L15ZF 1.5 L I4	67	(Japan) Yoshihiko Nakamura	1
(Japan) Access Racing Team	Toyota Vitz (NCP131)	Toyota 1NZ-FE 1.5 L I4	110	(Japan) Toshiyuki Matsuda	1–6
(Japan) Access Racing Team	Toyota Vitz (NCP131)	Toyota 1NZ-FE 1.5 L I4	110	(Japan) Mark Sekiya	1–6
(Japan) Access Racing Team	Toyota Vitz (NCP131)	Toyota 1NZ-FE 1.5 L I4	110	(Japan) Sota Muto	1–6
(Japan) Access Racing Team	Toyota Vitz (NCP131)	Toyota 1NZ-FE 1.5 L I4	110	(United States) Hana Burton	3
(Japan) Access Racing Team	Toyota Vitz (NCP131)	Toyota 1NZ-FE 1.5 L I4	110	(Japan) "Ishibashi"	3
(Japan) Access Racing Team	Toyota Vitz (NCP131)	Toyota 1NZ-FE 1.5 L I4	110	(Japan) Tatsuki Maeda	6
(Japan) Honda Cars Tokai	Honda Fit4 RS (GS4)	Honda L15ZF 1.5 L I4	222	(Japan) Toshiki Takeuchi	1–6
(Japan) Honda Cars Tokai	Honda Fit4 RS (GS4)	Honda L15ZF 1.5 L I4	222	(Japan) Masayuki Sumi	1–6
(Japan) Honda Cars Tokai	Honda Fit4 RS (GS4)	Honda L15ZF 1.5 L I4	222	(Japan) Masaki Nishihata	1–6
(Japan) Honda Cars Tokai	Honda Fit4 RS (GS4)	Honda L15ZF 1.5 L I4	222	(Japan) Hiroshi Ito	1–6
(Japan) AutoLabo Racing	Toyota Yaris (MXPA10)	Toyota M15A-FKS 1.5 L I3	291	(Japan) Natsuki Obi	1, 4–6
(Japan) AutoLabo Racing	Toyota Yaris (MXPA10)	Toyota M15A-FKS 1.5 L I3	291	(Japan) Teiichiro Fukiya	1, 5–6
(Japan) AutoLabo Racing	Toyota Yaris (MXPA10)	Toyota M15A-FKS 1.5 L I3	291	(Japan) Takeshi Kitagawa	1
(Japan) AutoLabo Racing	Toyota Yaris (MXPA10)	Toyota M15A-FKS 1.5 L I3	291	(Japan) Daisuke Mori	4–6
(Japan) AutoLabo Racing	Toyota Yaris (MXPA10)	Toyota M15A-FKS 1.5 L I3	291	(Japan) Yuichi Yokoo	4
(Japan) AutoLabo Racing	Toyota Yaris (MXPA10)	Toyota M15A-FKS 1.5 L I3	291	(Japan) Atsuhito Ohtomo	4
(Japan) AutoLabo Racing	Toyota Yaris (MXPA10)	Toyota M15A-FKS 1.5 L I3	291	(Japan) Junko Fujii	5
(Japan) AndLegal Racing	Honda Fit3 RS (GK5)	Honda L15B 1.5 L I4	821	(Japan) Katsuhiro Sato	1–6
(Japan) AndLegal Racing	Honda Fit3 RS (GK5)	Honda L15B 1.5 L I4	821	(Japan) Kenta Kawafuku	1–6
(Japan) AndLegal Racing	Honda Fit3 RS (GK5)	Honda L15B 1.5 L I4	821	(Japan) Hiroshi Ueda	1–6
(Japan) AndLegal Racing	Honda Fit3 RS (GK5)	Honda L15B 1.5 L I4	821	(Japan) Takuya Shiga	1–3
(Japan) AndLegal Racing	Honda Fit3 RS (GK5)	Honda L15B 1.5 L I4	821	(Japan) Masaki Baba	3, 5
(Japan) AndLegal Racing	Honda Fit3 RS (GK5)	Honda L15B 1.5 L I4	821	(Japan) Junichiro Kasahara	3
5R (1,500cc and below with rear wheel drive)
(Japan) Maple Hiroshima Racing Team	Mazda Roadster (ND5RC)	Mazda Skyactiv-G P5-VPS 1.5 L I4	27	(Japan) Haruhiko Sugino	1–2, 4–6
(Japan) Maple Hiroshima Racing Team	Mazda Roadster (ND5RC)	Mazda Skyactiv-G P5-VPS 1.5 L I4	27	(Japan) Yuga Furutani	1–2, 4–6
(Japan) Maple Hiroshima Racing Team	Mazda Roadster (ND5RC)	Mazda Skyactiv-G P5-VPS 1.5 L I4	27	(Japan) Takafumi Katsuki	1–2, 4–6
(Japan) Lovedrive Racing	Mazda Roadster (ND5RC)	Mazda Skyactiv-G P5-VPS 1.5 L I4	50	(Chinese Taipei) Hung Mingwei	2–3, 6
(Japan) Lovedrive Racing	Mazda Roadster (ND5RC)	Mazda Skyactiv-G P5-VPS 1.5 L I4	50	(Japan) Yasuhiro Ito	2–3
(Japan) Lovedrive Racing	Mazda Roadster (ND5RC)	Mazda Skyactiv-G P5-VPS 1.5 L I4	50	(Japan) Iona Hayase	2
(Japan) Lovedrive Racing	Mazda Roadster (ND5RC)	Mazda Skyactiv-G P5-VPS 1.5 L I4	50	(Japan) Junko Fujii	3, 6
(Japan) Lovedrive Racing	Mazda Roadster (ND5RC)	Mazda Skyactiv-G P5-VPS 1.5 L I4	50	(Japan) Keita Sawa	3, 6
(Japan) Lovedrive Racing	Mazda Roadster (ND5RC)	Mazda Skyactiv-G P5-VPS 1.5 L I4	50	(Japan) Mitsutaka Kimura	3
(Japan) Lovedrive Racing	Mazda Roadster (ND5RC)	Mazda Skyactiv-G P5-VPS 1.5 L I4	50	(Japan) Ryoko Nakamura	3
(Japan) Lovedrive Racing	Mazda Roadster (ND5RC)	Mazda Skyactiv-G P5-VPS 1.5 L I4	50	(Chinese Taipei) Su Yenming	6
(Japan) Over Drive	Mazda Roadster (ND5RC)	Mazda Skyactiv-G P5-VPS 1.5 L I4	65	(Japan) Shuichiro Hokazono	1–6
(Japan) Over Drive	Mazda Roadster (ND5RC)	Mazda Skyactiv-G P5-VPS 1.5 L I4	65	(Japan) Hirohito Ito	1–6
(Japan) Over Drive	Mazda Roadster (ND5RC)	Mazda Skyactiv-G P5-VPS 1.5 L I4	65	(Japan) Eiji Niwa	1–4, 6
(Japan) Over Drive	Mazda Roadster (ND5RC)	Mazda Skyactiv-G P5-VPS 1.5 L I4	65	(Japan) Keishi Ishikawa	1
(Japan) Over Drive	Mazda Roadster (ND5RC)	Mazda Skyactiv-G P5-VPS 1.5 L I4	65	(Japan) Tsuyoshi Hirata	2
(Japan) Over Drive	Mazda Roadster (ND5RC)	Mazda Skyactiv-G P5-VPS 1.5 L I4	65	(Japan) Kunihiro Miyazaki	3, 5
(Japan) Over Drive	Mazda Roadster (ND5RC)	Mazda Skyactiv-G P5-VPS 1.5 L I4	65	(Japan) Shogo Nishikawa	3
(Japan) Over Drive	Mazda Roadster (ND5RC)	Mazda Skyactiv-G P5-VPS 1.5 L I4	65	(Japan) Ryohei Yamaichi	5
(Japan) Over Drive	Mazda Roadster (ND5RC)	Mazda Skyactiv-G P5-VPS 1.5 L I4	65	(Japan) Takayuki Takeuchi	6
(Japan) Progress Racing	Mazda Roadster (ND5RC)	Mazda Skyactiv-G P5-VPS 1.5 L I4	76	(Japan) Yuya Egi	1–6
(Japan) Progress Racing	Mazda Roadster (ND5RC)	Mazda Skyactiv-G P5-VPS 1.5 L I4	76	(Japan) Junpei Kato	1–3
(Japan) Progress Racing	Mazda Roadster (ND5RC)	Mazda Skyactiv-G P5-VPS 1.5 L I4	76	(Japan) Hitoshi Sakai	1–3
(Japan) Progress Racing	Mazda Roadster (ND5RC)	Mazda Skyactiv-G P5-VPS 1.5 L I4	76	(Japan) Kazutaka Tokufuji	1, 3–6
(Japan) Progress Racing	Mazda Roadster (ND5RC)	Mazda Skyactiv-G P5-VPS 1.5 L I4	76	(Japan) Tsukasa Yamamoto	2, 6
(Japan) Progress Racing	Mazda Roadster (ND5RC)	Mazda Skyactiv-G P5-VPS 1.5 L I4	76	(Japan) Masakazu Sakai	3
(Japan) Progress Racing	Mazda Roadster (ND5RC)	Mazda Skyactiv-G P5-VPS 1.5 L I4	76	(Japan) Nanami Tsukamoto	3
(Japan) Progress Racing	Mazda Roadster (ND5RC)	Mazda Skyactiv-G P5-VPS 1.5 L I4	76	(Japan) Ryosuke Moroi	4
(Japan) Progress Racing	Mazda Roadster (ND5RC)	Mazda Skyactiv-G P5-VPS 1.5 L I4	76	(Japan) Nagayasu Miyagi	4
(Japan) Progress Racing	Mazda Roadster (ND5RC)	Mazda Skyactiv-G P5-VPS 1.5 L I4	76	(Japan) "Ishiken"	5
(Japan) Murakami Motors	Mazda Roadster (ND5RC)	Mazda Skyactiv-G P5-VPS 1.5 L I4	88	(Japan) Hiroyuki Murakami	1–6
(Japan) Murakami Motors	Mazda Roadster (ND5RC)	Mazda Skyactiv-G P5-VPS 1.5 L I4	88	(Japan) Tatsuya Ohta	1–6
(Japan) Murakami Motors	Mazda Roadster (ND5RC)	Mazda Skyactiv-G P5-VPS 1.5 L I4	88	(Japan) Sena Kuronuma	1–6
(Japan) Murakami Motors	Mazda Roadster (ND5RC)	Mazda Skyactiv-G P5-VPS 1.5 L I4	88	(Japan) Soichiro Yoshida	1–6
(Japan) Murakami Motors	Mazda Roadster (ND5RC)	Mazda Skyactiv-G P5-VPS 1.5 L I4	88	(Japan) Keiji Amemiya	3
(Japan) Murakami Motors	Mazda Roadster (ND5RC)	Mazda Skyactiv-G P5-VPS 1.5 L I4	89	(Japan) Naohiro Yonekawa	1–4, 6
(Japan) Murakami Motors	Mazda Roadster (ND5RC)	Mazda Skyactiv-G P5-VPS 1.5 L I4	89	(Japan) Marie Iwaoka	1–4
(Japan) Murakami Motors	Mazda Roadster (ND5RC)	Mazda Skyactiv-G P5-VPS 1.5 L I4	89	(Japan) Mai Hiwatari	1–3
(Japan) Murakami Motors	Mazda Roadster (ND5RC)	Mazda Skyactiv-G P5-VPS 1.5 L I4	89	(Japan) Koki Ebukuro	1, 3–6
(Japan) Murakami Motors	Mazda Roadster (ND5RC)	Mazda Skyactiv-G P5-VPS 1.5 L I4	89	(Japan) "Makoto"	2–4, 6
(Japan) Murakami Motors	Mazda Roadster (ND5RC)	Mazda Skyactiv-G P5-VPS 1.5 L I4	89	(Japan) Shinichi Uemura	3, 6
(Japan) Murakami Motors	Mazda Roadster (ND5RC)	Mazda Skyactiv-G P5-VPS 1.5 L I4	89	(Japan) "Makoto"	5
(Japan) Club Mazda Spirit Racing Roadster	Mazda Roadster (ND5RC)	Mazda Skyactiv-G P5-VPS 1.5 L I4	120	(Japan) Junji Ueda	1–4, 6
(Japan) Club Mazda Spirit Racing Roadster	Mazda Roadster (ND5RC)	Mazda Skyactiv-G P5-VPS 1.5 L I4	120	(Japan) Taisei Matsubara	1–3
(Japan) Club Mazda Spirit Racing Roadster	Mazda Roadster (ND5RC)	Mazda Skyactiv-G P5-VPS 1.5 L I4	120	(Japan) Tatsuhiko Katoh	1–3
(Japan) Club Mazda Spirit Racing Roadster	Mazda Roadster (ND5RC)	Mazda Skyactiv-G P5-VPS 1.5 L I4	120	(Japan) Yasumasa Yoshida	1, 6
(Japan) Club Mazda Spirit Racing Roadster	Mazda Roadster (ND5RC)	Mazda Skyactiv-G P5-VPS 1.5 L I4	120	(Japan) Takumi Minamisawa	2–4, 6
(Japan) Club Mazda Spirit Racing Roadster	Mazda Roadster (ND5RC)	Mazda Skyactiv-G P5-VPS 1.5 L I4	120	(Japan) Subaru Kumeta	3–4, 6
(Japan) Club Mazda Spirit Racing Roadster	Mazda Roadster (ND5RC)	Mazda Skyactiv-G P5-VPS 1.5 L I4	120	(Japan) Yasunori Yoshida	4
(Japan) Club Mazda Spirit Racing Roadster	Mazda Roadster (ND5RC)	Mazda Skyactiv-G P5-VPS 1.5 L I4	120	(Japan) Takuya Minamisawa	4
(Japan) Koshido Racing	Mazda Roadster (ND5RC)	Mazda Skyactiv-G P5-VPS 1.5 L I4	610	(Japan) Motoharu Sato	1–6
(Japan) Koshido Racing	Mazda Roadster (ND5RC)	Mazda Skyactiv-G P5-VPS 1.5 L I4	610	(Japan) Yusaku Shibata	1–6
(Japan) Koshido Racing	Mazda Roadster (ND5RC)	Mazda Skyactiv-G P5-VPS 1.5 L I4	610	(Japan) Yasuji Asai	1–6
(Japan) Koshido Racing	Mazda Roadster (ND5RC)	Mazda Skyactiv-G P5-VPS 1.5 L I4	610	(Japan) Kengo Yamamoto	2–3, 5
(Japan) Koshido Racing	Mazda Roadster (ND5RC)	Mazda Skyactiv-G P5-VPS 1.5 L I4	610	(Japan) Kento Omiya	3

== Race results ==
Round	Circuit	Race	ST-X Winners	ST-Z Winners	ST-TCR Winners	ST-Q Winners	ST-1 Winners
1	Motegi	Group 1	did not participate	(Japan) No. 26 Team ZeroOne	(Japan) No. 97 M&K Racing	did not participate	
1	Motegi	Group 1	did not participate	(Japan) Ryuichiro Otsuka (Japan) Ryuichiro Tomita (Japan) Takuro Shinohara (Japan) Seiji Ara	(Japan) Mitsuhiro Endō (Japan) Shinji Nakano (United Kingdom) Jack Young (Japan) Kento Omiya	did not participate	
1	Motegi	Group 2	(Japan) No. 666 Seven x Seven Racing	(Japan) No. 52 Saitama Green Brave	did not participate	(Japan) No. 104 GR Team Spirit	(Japan) No. 2 K's Frontier KTM Cars
1	Motegi	Group 2	(Japan) "Bankcy" (Japan) Kiyoto Fujinami (Japan) Tsubasa Kondo (Japan) Taichi Watarai	(Japan) Manabu Yamazaki (Japan) Hiroki Yoshida (Japan) Naoki Hattori (Japan) Seita Nonaka	did not participate	(Japan) Kazuhiko Omasa (Japan) Kenta Yamashita (Japan) Shunsuke Kohno (Japan) Takamitsu Matsui	(Japan) Taiyo Ida (Japan) Hiroki Katoh (Japan) Kazuho Takahashi (Japan) Hiroki Yoshimoto
2	Suzuka		(Japan) No. 666 Seven x Seven Racing	(Japan) No. 52 Saitama Green Brave	did not participate	(Japan) No. 61 Team SDA Engineering	(Japan) No. 2 K's Frontier KTM Cars
2	Suzuka		(Japan) "Bankcy" (Japan) Kiyoto Fujinami (Japan) Tsubasa Kondo (Japan) Taichi Watarai	(Japan) Manabu Yamazaki (Japan) Hiroki Yoshida (Japan) Naoki Hattori (Japan) Seita Nonaka	did not participate	(Japan) Kazuhiro Ito (Japan) Hideki Yamauchi (Japan) Takuto Iguchi (Japan) Masafumi Hanazawa	(Japan) Taiyo Ida (Japan) Hiroki Katoh (Japan) Kazuho Takahashi (Japan) Hiroki Yoshimoto
3	Fuji 24h		(Japan) No. 23 TKRI	(Japan) No. 25 Team ZeroOne	(Japan) No. 19 Birth Racing Project【BRP】	(Japan) No. 28 TOYOTA GAZOO ROOKIE Racing	(Japan) No. 47 D'station Racing
3	Fuji 24h		(Japan) "Daisuke" (Japan) Tatsuya Kataoka (Japan) Shunji Okumoto (Japan) Yuhki Nakayama (Japan) Yuya Motojima	(Japan) Yuki Tanaka (Japan) Teppei Natori (Japan) Tsugio Matsuda (Japan) Kimiya Sato (Italy) Ronnie Quintarelli (Japan) Masataka Yanagida	(Japan) Takashi Kochiya (Japan) Takeshi Suehiro (Japan) Jiei Okuzumi (Japan) Takahisa Ohno (Japan) Taiga Imoto (Japan) Hirokazu Okumura	(Japan) Daisuke Toyoda (Japan) Sho Tsuboi (Japan) Eisuke Sasaki (Japan) Kazuya Oshima (Japan) Aimi Saito (Japan) Nirei Fukuzumi	(Japan) Kenji Hama (Japan) Tatsuya Hoshino (Japan) Tetsuya Tanaka (Japan) Taiga Kabaki (Japan) Satoshi Hoshino (Japan) Yuta Kamimura
4	Sugo	Group 1	(Japan) No. 777 D'station Racing	(Japan) No. 52 Saitama Green Brave	(Japan) No. 98 Waimarama Racing	(Japan) No. 61 Team SDA Engineering	(Japan) No. 47 D'station Racing
4	Sugo	Group 1	(Japan) Satoshi Hoshino (Japan) Tomonobu Fujii (Japan) Yuta Kamimura	(Japan) Manabu Yamazaki (Japan) Hiroki Yoshida (Japan) Naoki Hattori (Japan) Seita Nonaka	(Japan) "Kizuna" (Japan) Katsumasa Chiyo (South Korea) Lee Jung-woo	(Japan) Kazuhiro Ito (Japan) Hideki Yamauchi (Japan) Takuto Iguchi (Japan) Masafumi Hanazawa	(Japan) Kenji Hama (Japan) Tatsuya Hoshino (Japan) Tetsuya Tanaka (Japan) Taiga Kabaki
4	Sugo	Group 2	did not participate				
5	Autopolis		(Japan) No. 31 apr	did not participate	(Japan) No. 97 M&K Racing	(Japan) No. 271 Team HRC	did not participate
5	Autopolis		(Japan) Ryuta Ukai (Japan) Naoya Gamou (Japan) Rikuto Kobayashi (Japan) Koki Saga	did not participate	(Japan) Mitsuhiro Endō (Japan) Shinji Nakano (United Kingdom) Jack Young	(Japan) Hiroki Otsu (Japan) Yuto Nomura (Japan) Shion Tsujimoto	did not participate
6	Okayama	Group 1	(Japan) No. 666 Seven x Seven Racing	(Japan) No. 26 Team ZeroOne	(Japan) No. 98 Waimarama Racing	(Japan) No. 271 Team HRC	(Japan) No. 47 D'station Racing
6	Okayama	Group 1	(Japan) "Bankcy" (Japan) Kiyoto Fujinami (Japan) Taichi Watarai	(Japan) Ryuichiro Otsuka (Japan) Ryuichiro Tomita (Japan) Takuro Shinohara	(Japan) Ryusuke Masumoto (Japan) Katsumasa Chiyo (South Korea) Lee Jung-woo	(Japan) Hiroki Otsu (Japan) Yuto Nomura (Japan) Shion Tsujimoto	(Japan) Kenji Hama (Japan) Tatsuya Hoshino (Japan) Tetsuya Tanaka (Japan) Taiga Kabaki
6	Okayama	Group 2	did not participate			(Japan) No. 31 TOYOTA GAZOO ROOKIE Racing	did not participate
6	Okayama	Group 2	did not participate			(Japan) "Morizo" (Japan) Yasuhiro Ogura (Japan) Masahiro Sasaki (Japan) Hiroaki Ishiura	did not participate
7	Fuji 4h		(Japan) No. 666 Seven x Seven Racing	(Japan) No. 34 Techno First	(Japan) No. 97 M&K Racing	(Japan) No. 230 NISMO	(Japan) No. 2 K's Frontier KTM Cars
7	Fuji 4h		(Japan) "Bankcy" (Japan) Kiyoto Fujinami (Japan) Taichi Watarai	(Japan) Yuki Fujii (Japan) Hironobu Yasuda (Japan) Riki Okusa	(Japan) Mitsuhiro Endō (Japan) Shinji Nakano (United Kingdom) Jack Young (Japan) Kento Omiya	(Japan) Kohei Hirate (Japan) Daiki Sasaki (Japan) Atsushi Miyake	(Japan) Taiyo Ida (Japan) Hiroki Katoh (Japan) Kazuho Takahashi (Japan) Hiroki Yoshimoto

Round	Circuit	Race	ST-2 Winners	ST-3 Winners	ST-4 Winners	ST-5F Winners	ST-5R Winners
1	Motegi	Group 1	did not participate		(Japan) No. 884 SHADE Racing	(Japan) No. 67 Team Yamato	(Japan) No. 88 Murakami Motors
1	Motegi	Group 1	did not participate		(Japan) Masahiko Kageyama (Japan) Eijiro Shimizu (Japan) Shinnosuke Yamada	(Japan) Ryohei Yasui (Japan) Shinya Uchiyama (Japan) Ryo Mukumoto (Japan) Yoshihiko Nakamura	(Japan) Hiroyuki Murakami (Japan) Tatsuya Ota (Japan) Sena Kuronuma (Japan) Soichiro Yoshida
1	Motegi	Group 2	(Japan) No. 225 KTMS	(Japan) No. 39 Tracy Sports with Delta	(Japan) No. 884 SHADE Racing	did not participate	
1	Motegi	Group 2	(Japan) Riona Tomishita (Japan) Tokiya Suzuki (Japan) Hibiki Taira	(Japan) Shinya Fujita (Japan) Takumi Sanada (Japan) Takashi Ito	(Japan) Masahiko Kageyama (Japan) Eijiro Shimizu (Japan) Shinnosuke Yamada	did not participate	
2	Suzuka		did not participate	(Japan) No. 15 Okabe Jidosha Motorsport	(Japan) No. 66 Over Drive	(Japan) No. 67 Team Yamato	(Japan) No. 27 Maple Hiroshima Racing Team
2	Suzuka		did not participate	(Japan) Shuji Maejima (Japan) Masaaki Nagashima (Japan) Tsubasa Mekaru (Japan) Seiya Motojima	(Japan) Kyousuke Inomata (Japan) Kohei Tokumasu (Japan) Yuta Fujiwara	(Japan) Ryohei Yasui (Japan) Shinya Uchiyama (Japan) Ryo Mukumoto	(Japan) Haruhiko Sugino (Japan) Yuga Furutani (Japan) Takafumi Katsuki
3	Fuji 24h		(Japan) No. 72 Nihon Automobile College	(Japan) No. 39 Tracy Sports with Delta	(Japan) No. 884 SHADE Racing	(Japan) No. 821 AndLegal Racing	(Japan) No. 88 Murakami Motors
3	Fuji 24h		(Japan) Makoto Kanai (Japan) Tetsuya Yamano (Japan) Toshiya Nojima (Japan) Ippei Yamazaki (Japan) Hiroki Otsu	(Japan) Shinya Fujita (Japan) Takumi Sanada (Japan) Takashi Ito (Japan) Takuya Otaki (Japan) Ren Takashi	(Japan) Masahiko Kageyama (Japan) Eijiro Shimizu (Japan) Shinnosuke Yamada (Japan) Morio Nitta	(Japan) Katsuhiro Sato (Japan) Kenta Kawafuku (Japan) Hiroshi Ueda (Japan) Takuya Shiga (Japan) Junichiro Kasahara (Japan) Masaki Baba	(Japan) Hiroyuki Murakami (Japan) Tatsuya Ota (Japan) Keiji Amamiya (Japan) Sena Kuronuma (Japan) Soichiro Yoshida
4	Sugo	Group 1	did not participate				
4	Sugo	Group 2	(Japan) No. 72 Nihon Automobile College	did not participate		(Japan) No. 4 Team Bride	(Japan) No. 120 Club Mazda Spirit Racing Roadster
4	Sugo	Group 2	(Japan) Makoto Kanai (Japan) Tetsuya Yamano (Japan) Toshiya Nojima (Japan) Ippei Yamazaki	did not participate		(Japan) Yuya Ohta (Japan) Kaoru Arai (Japan) Takao Seto (Japan) Kuniyuki Haga	(Japan) Junji Ueda (Japan) Subaru Kumeta (Japan) Yasunori Yoshida (Japan) Takuya Minamisawa
5	Autopolis		(Japan) No. 225 KTMS	(Japan) No. 16 Okabe Jidosha Motorsport	(Japan) No. 3 Endless Sports	(Japan) No. 17 Team Nopro	(Japan) No. 610 Koshido Racing
5	Autopolis		(Japan) Riona Tomishita (Japan) Tokiya Suzuki (Japan) Hibiki Taira	(Japan) Toru Tanaka (Japan) Hironobu Shimizu (Japan) Atsushi Miyake (Japan) Hibiki Komatsu	(Japan) Hiroyuki Saga (Japan) Togo Suganami (Japan) Ryo Ogawa (Japan) Atsushi Shimaya	(Japan) Yoshihiro Kato (Japan) Misaki Konishi (Japan) Takuya Ooi (Japan) Tatsuya Nogami	(Japan) Motoharu Sato (Japan) Yusaku Shibata (Japan) Yasuji Asai (Japan) Kengo Yamamoto
6	Okayama	Group 1	did not participate		did not participate	did not participate	
6	Okayama	Group 2	(Japan) No. 225 KTMS	(Japan) No. 15 Okabe Jidosha Motorsport	did not participate	(Japan) No. 4 Team Bride	(Japan) No. 88 Murakami Motors
6	Okayama	Group 2	(Japan) Riona Tomishita (Japan) Tokiya Suzuki (Japan) Hibiki Taira	(Japan) Shuji Maejima (Japan) Masaaki Nagashima (Japan) Tsubasa Mekaru	did not participate	(Japan) Yuya Ohta (Japan) Kaoru Arai (Japan) Takao Seto (Japan) Kuniyuki Haga	(Japan) Hiroyuki Murakami (Japan) Tatsuya Ota (Japan) Sena Kuronuma (Japan) Soichiro Yoshida
7	Fuji 4h		(Japan) No. 743 Honda R&D Challenge	(Japan) No. 16 Okabe Jidosha Motorsport	(Japan) No. 3 Endless Sports	did not participate	
7	Fuji 4h		(Japan) Hiroki Ishigaki (Japan) Akira Bitoh (Japan) Junichi Kidachi	(Japan) Toru Tanaka (Japan) Hironobu Shimizu (Japan) Hibiki Komatsu	(Japan) Hiroyuki Saga (Japan) Togo Suganami (Japan) Ryo Ogawa (Japan) Atsushi Shimaya	did not participate	

== Championship standings ==
Championship points are awarded in every class with the exception of ST-Q at the end of each event.

For the ST-X, ST-Z, and ST-TCR championships, each team's six highest scoring rounds are validated in the final championship standings.

Points systems
Duration	1st	2nd	3rd	4th	5th	6th	7th	8th	9th	10th	≤11th	Pole
3–4 Hours / 500 km	20	15	12	10	8	6	4	3	2	1	0	2
5 Hours / 700 km	30	22.5	18	15	12	9	6	4.5	3	1.5	1	2
≥12 Hours / 1400 km	45	35	27	23	18	13	9	7	5	3	1	2

Notes

- If the final round of the class championship is less than five hours or 700 kilometres, 1.5 times the regular amount of points will be awarded.

=== Teams' Championship standings ===
==== ST-X ====
Pos	Teams	MRM		SUZ	24H	SUG		AUT	OIC		FSW	Pts
Pos	Teams	G1	G2	SUZ	24H	G1	G2	AUT	G1	G2	FSW	Pts
1	(Japan) No. 666 Seven x Seven Racing		1	1	2				1		1	139
2	(Japan) No. 23 TKRI		2	4	1	2		3	6		2	130.5
3	(Japan) No. 31 apr		3	5	4	3		1	2		5	109
4	(Japan) No. No. 777 D'station Racing		4	3		1		4	3		3	95
5	(Japan) No. 101 Hitotsuyama Racing		Ret	6	3			2			Ret	58.5
6	(Hong Kong) No. 33 Craft-Bamboo Racing			2	Ret	WD			4		Ret	38.5
7	(Japan) No. 81 GTNET MotorSports				5				5		Ret	26
Pos	Teams	G1	G2	SUZ	24H	G1	G2	AUT	G1	G2	FSW	Pts
Pos	Teams	MRM		SUZ	24H	SUG		AUT	OIC		FSW	Pts

==== ST-Z ====
Pos	Teams	MRM		SUZ	24H	SUG		OIC		FSW	Pts
Pos	Teams	G1	G2	SUZ	24H	G1	G2	G1	G2	FSW	Pts
1	(Japan) No. 52 Saitama Green Brave	3	1	1	2	1		3		4	146
2	(Japan) No. 26 Team ZeroOne	1	3	4	Ret	2		1		5	96
3	(Japan) No. 885 SHADE Racing	4	2	2	4	4		Ret		6	93.5
4	(Japan) No. 25 Team ZeroOne	2	Ret	5	1	8		Ret		10	78.5
5	(Japan) No. 22 Porsche Team Ebi	Ret	WD	3	3	7		8		2	76.5
6	(Japan) No. 34 Techno First	7	4	7		Ret		4		1	62
7	(Japan) No. 20 Team Impul	6	5	8	6	5		2		7	60.5
8	(Japan) No. 21 Hitotsuyama Racing	5	6	6	8	3		Ret		3	60
9	(Japan) No. 5 Team Noah	Ret	Ret	11	5			5		8	31.5
10	(Japan) No. 51 Birth Racing Project【BRP】	8	8	9		6		7		11	20
11	(Japan) No. 111 Progress Racing	9	7	Ret	7	9				9	20
12	(China) No. 315 Prime Racing			10				6			7.5
Pos	Teams	G1	G2	SUZ	24H	G1	G2	G1	G2	FSW	Pts
Pos	Teams	MRM		SUZ	24H	SUG		OIC		FSW	Pts

==== ST-TCR ====
Pos	Teams	MRM		24H	SUG		AUT	OIC		FSW	Pts
Pos	Teams	G1	G2	24H	G1	G2	AUT	G1	G2	FSW	Pts
1	(Japan) No. 98 Waimarama Racing	3		2	1		3	1		4	122
2	(Japan) No. 97 M&K Racing	1			2		1	3		1	117
3	(Japan) No. 19 Birth Racing Project【BRP】	2		1	Ret		2	Ret		2	105
4	(Japan) No. 430 Audi Team Show Apex	Ret			3		Ret	2		3	45
5	(Japan) No. 96 M&K Racing	4			4		Ret	4		6	39
—	(Japan) No. 888 FET Racing						Ret			5	12
Pos	Teams	G1	G2	24H	G1	G2	AUT	G1	G2	FSW	Pts
Pos	Teams	MRM		24H	SUG		AUT	OIC		FSW	Pts

==== ST-Q ====
Pos	Teams	MRM		SUZ	24H	SUG		AUT	OIC		FSW	Pts
Pos	Teams	G1	G2	SUZ	24H	G1	G2	AUT	G1	G2	FSW	Pts
—	(Japan) No. 61 Team SDA Engineering			1	2	1					2	0
—	(Japan) No. 271 Team HRC							1	1		7	0
—	(Japan) No. 104 GR Team Spirit		1	2	4			2		4	3	0
—	(Japan) No. 32 TOYOTA GAZOO ROOKIE Racing				5			3		1	8	0
—	(Japan) No. 28 TOYOTA GAZOO ROOKIE Racing				1			Ret		3	6	0
—	(Japan) No. 230 NISMO										1	0
—	(Japan) No. 12 Mazda Spirit Racing			3	3					2	4	0
—	(Japan) No. 55 Mazda Spirit Racing			4	6						5	0
Pos	Teams	G1	G2	SUZ	24H	G1	G2	AUT	G1	G2	FSW	Pts
Pos	Teams	MRM		SUZ	24H	SUG		AUT	OIC		FSW	Pts

==== ST-1 ====
Pos	Teams	MRM		SUZ	24H	SUG		OIC		FSW	Pts
Pos	Teams	G1	G2	SUZ	24H	G1	G2	G1	G2	FSW	Pts
1	(Japan) No. 47 D'station Racing		2	2	1	1		1		2	145
2	(Japan) No. 2 K's Frontier KTM Cars		1	1	2	Ret		2		1	142
Pos	Teams	G1	G2	SUZ	24H	G1	G2	G1	G2	FSW	Pts
Pos	Teams	MRM		SUZ	24H	SUG		OIC		FSW	Pts

==== ST-2 ====
Pos	Teams	MRM		24H	SUG		AUT	OIC		FSW	Pts
Pos	Teams	G1	G2	24H	G1	G2	AUT	G1	G2	FSW	Pts
1	(Japan) No. 72 Nihon Automobile College		3	1		1	2		4	5	123.5
2	(Japan) No. 225 KTMS		1	5		3	1		1	3	118
3	(Japan) No. 13 Endless Sports		2	3		2	3		5	4	98
4	(Japan) No. 95 Team Spoon		6	2		Ret	7		2	2	84.5
5	(Japan) No. 743 Honda R&D Challenge		4	4		5	8		6	1	83.5
6	(Japan) No. 6 Shinryo Racing Team		5	6		4	5		3	Ret	63
7	(Japan) No. 7 Shinryo Racing Team		Ret	8		6	4		7	6	41
8	(Japan) No. 36 HCM Uchino Racing		Ret	7			6		8	7	27
Pos	Teams	G1	G2	24H	G1	G2	AUT	G1	G2	FSW	Pts
Pos	Teams	MRM		24H	SUG		AUT	OIC		FSW	Pts

==== ST-3 ====
Pos	Teams	MRM		SUZ	24H	AUT	OIC		FSW	Pts
Pos	Teams	G1	G2	SUZ	24H	AUT	G1	G2	FSW	Pts
1	(Japan) No. 39 Tracy Sports with Delta		1	2	1	3		2	2	145
2	(Japan) No. 15 Okabe Jidosha Motorsport		4	1	4	2		1	3	129.5
3	(Japan) No. 16 Okabe Jidosha Motorsport		2	4	3	1		4	1	129
4	(Japan) No. 38 Tracy Sports with Delta		3	3	2	4		3	4	109
Pos	Teams	G1	G2	SUZ	24H	G1	G2	AUT	FSW	Pts
Pos	Teams	MRM		SUZ	24H	OIC		AUT	FSW	Pts

==== ST-4 ====
Pos	Teams	MRM		SUZ	24H	AUT	FSW	Pts
Pos	Teams	G1	G2	SUZ	24H	AUT	FSW	Pts
1	(Japan) No. 884 SHADE Racing	1	1	4	1	2	9	133.5
2	(Japan) No. 3 Endless Sports	3	3	3	4	1	1	125
3	(Japan) No. 41 Tracy Sports With Delta	2	2	2	2	4	6	111.5
4	(Japan) No. 66 Over Drive	Ret	4	1	6	3	2	97.5
5	(Japan) No. 18 Asano Racing Service	4	8	6	5	5	3	70
6	(Japan) No. 37 Team NOPRO	6	6	Ret	3	6	7	54
7	(Japan) No. 216 HMR Racing	5	Ret	5	Ret		5	32
8	(Japan) No. 60 Zenyaku With Team G/Motion'	Ret	7	7	Ret	7	4	31
9	(Japan) No. 290 AutoLabo	7	5	Ret	Ret	8	8	21
Pos	Teams	G1	G2	SUZ	24H	AUT	FSW	Pts
Pos	Teams	MRM		SUZ	24H	AUT	FSW	Pts

==== ST-5 ====
Pos	Teams	MRM		SUZ	24H	SUG		AUT	OIC		Pts
Pos	Teams	G1	G2	SUZ	24H	G1	G2	AUT	G1	G2	Pts
ST-5F
1	(Japan) No. 67 Team Yamato	1		1	4		2	3		2	134.5
2	(Japan) No. 4 Team Bride	2		Ret	5		1	2		1	111.5
3	(Japan) No. 821 AndLegal Racing	5		6	1		Ret	5		4	89
4	(Japan) No. 11 Sakae Motor Sports	6		4	2		4	8		3	88.5
5	(Japan) No. 222 Honda Cars Tokai	4		5	3		6	4		7	76
6	(Japan) No. 110 Access Racing Team	8		2	Ret		7	7		5	47.5
7	(Japan) No. 17 Team NOPRO	3		3	Ret		3	1			42
8	(Japan) No. 291 AutoLabo Racing	7					5	6		6	30
ST-5R
1	(Japan) No. 88 Murakami Motors	1		5	1		2	5		1	146
2	(Japan) No. 610 Koshido Racing	3		Ret	2		4	1		2	109.5
3	(Japan) No. 76 Progress Racing	4		2	4		6	3		5	89.5
4	(Japan) No. 27 Maple Hiroshima Racing Team	2		1			Ret	2		3	85.5
5	(Japan) No. 120 Club Mazda Spirit Racing Roadster	Ret		4	3		1			6	71
6	(Japan) No. 65 Over Drive	Ret		3	7		3	4		4	69
7	(Japan) No. 89 Murakami Motors	5		6	6		5	6		7	55
8	(Japan) No. 50 Lovedrive Racing			Ret	5					Ret	18
Pos	Teams	G1	G2	SUZ	24H	G1	G2	AUT	G1	G2	Pts
Pos	Teams	MRM		SUZ	24H	SUG		AUT	OIC		Pts
