= 2025 Macau Grand Prix =

72nd running of the Macau Grand Prix

Race details
- Date: 16 November 2025
- Official name: 72nd Macau Grand Prix – FIA FR World Cup
- Location: Guia Circuit, Macau
- Course: Temporary street circuit
- Course length: 6.120 km (3.803 mi)
- Distance: 15 laps, 91.800 km (57.042 mi)
- Weather: Dry and clear

Pole position
Driver	(United Kingdom) Freddie Slater	SJM Theodore Prema Racing

Fastest lap
Driver	(United Kingdom) Freddie Slater	SJM Theodore Prema Racing
- Time: 2:15.702 on lap 8

Podium
First	(France) Théophile Naël	KCMG Enya Pinnacle Motorsport
Second	(Spain) Mari Boya	KCMG Enya Pinnacle Motorsport
Third	(France) Enzo Deligny	R-ace GP

The 2025 Macau Grand Prix (formally the 72nd Macau Grand Prix – FIA FR World Cup) was a motor race for Formula Regional cars held on the streets of Macau on 16 November 2025. The race itself was made up of two races: a qualifying race that decided the starting grid for the fifteen-lap main event. The 2025 race was the 72nd running of the Macau Grand Prix, the second for Formula Regional cars and the second FIA FR World Cup.

== Background and entry list ==
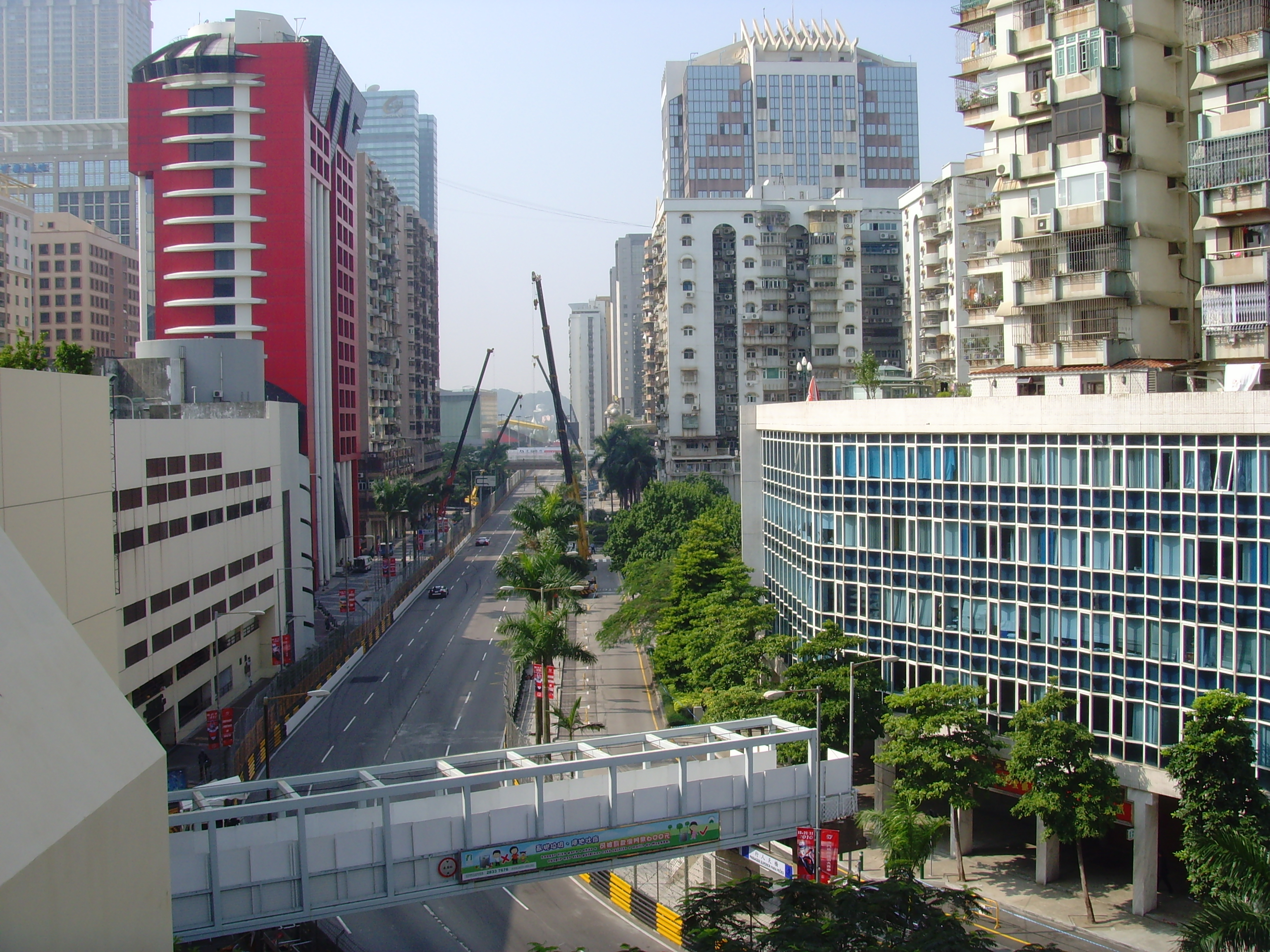
The Guia Circuit, where the race will be held.

The Macau Grand Prix is a race considered by drivers as a stepping stone to higher motor racing categories such as Formula One, and is Macau's most prestigious international sporting event. Held as a Formula Three race ever since 1983 - apart from three editions disrupted by the COVID-19 pandemic between 2020 and 2022, where the Grand Prix was held as a domestic Formula 4 event - the event switched to Formula Regional machinery from 2024 onwards.

The organizing bodies called this change a "natural consequence of the evolution of the junior single-seater landscape over the last couple of years", with Formula Regional now effectively embodying the multi-region multi-spec nature that F3 had previously been synonymous with.

=== Entry list ===
All competitors used an identical Tatuus T-318 chassis with a 1.742 L (106 cu in) turbocharged inline-4 engine developed by Autotecnica and Alfa Romeo. The ten participating teams were announced on 10 September.

Team	No.	Driver
(France) R-ace GP	2	(Italy) Matteo De Palo
(France) R-ace GP	3	(Japan) Jin Nakamura
(France) R-ace GP	5	(France) Enzo Deligny
(Republic of Ireland) KCMG Enya Pinnacle Motorsport	6	(France) Théophile Naël
(Republic of Ireland) KCMG Enya Pinnacle Motorsport	7	(Spain) Mari Boya
(Australia) Evans GP	8	(Austria) Charlie Wurz
(Australia) Evans GP	9	(Austria) Oscar Wurz
(Australia) Evans GP	10	(Japan) Hiyu Yamakoshi
(Hong Kong) SJM Theodore Prema Racing	11	(United Kingdom) Freddie Slater
(Hong Kong) SJM Theodore Prema Racing	12	(United Arab Emirates) Rashid Al Dhaheri
(Hong Kong) SJM Theodore Prema Racing	31	(Macau) Charles Leong
(France) Saintéloc Racing	15	(United States) James Egozi
(France) Saintéloc Racing	16	(Vietnam) Owen Tangavelou
(Japan) TOM'S Formula	17	(Japan) Yuki Sano
(Japan) TOM'S Formula	18	(Japan) Tokiya Suzuki
(Germany) PHM Racing	19	(Italy) Mattia Colnaghi
(Germany) PHM Racing	20	(Chinese Taipei) Enzo Yeh
(Germany) PHM Racing	21	(Mexico) José Garfias
(France) ART Grand Prix	22	(France) Evan Giltaire
(France) ART Grand Prix	23	(France) Taito Kato (Note: Kato is a Japanese driver competing under a French licence.)
(France) ART Grand Prix	24	(Japan) Kanato Le
(Italy) Trident Motorsport	25	(Denmark) Noah Strømsted
(Italy) Trident Motorsport	26	(Thailand) Tasanapol Inthraphuvasak
(Italy) Trident Motorsport	27	(United Kingdom) Reza Seewooruthun
(Netherlands) Van Amersfoort Racing	28	(Japan) Kiyoshi Umegaki
(Netherlands) Van Amersfoort Racing	29	(Poland) Tymek Kucharczyk
(Netherlands) Van Amersfoort Racing	30	(Italy) Newman Chi (Note: Chi is a Chinese driver competing under an Italian licence.)

== Practice and qualifying ==
The event featured two 40-minute practice sessions: the first on Thursday morning before the initial qualifying session, and the second on Friday before the second qualifying round. The qualification process itself was divided into two 40-minute sessions, with each driver's best time from either session determining their starting position for the qualification race.

The first practice session on Thursday morning saw the track designated as wet, but all drivers used dry tires. ART Grand Prix driver Taito Kato went fastest with a 2:16.412s lap, 0.044 seconds ahead of Prema's Freddie Slater. The KCMG/Pinnacle Motorsport pair of Mari Boya and Théophile Naël were next fastest, with R-ace GP's Enzo Deligny completing the top five, 0.319 seconds off the fastest time. Kato's ART teammates Evan Giltaire and Kanato Le came sixth and seventh, with the rest of the top ten completed by R-ace GP's Jin Nakamura, Prema's Rashid Al Dhaheri and the Evans GP of Charlie Wurz. Two incidents interrupted the session: Evans GP’s Hiyu Yamakoshi lost his rear-right wheel while on track, causing a red flag twelve minutes into the session, and Trident's Tasanapol Inthraphuvasak stopped on track, with the situation being handled under local yellow flags.

The first qualifying session on Thursday afternoon took place in clear, sunny conditions. Deligny set the first timed lap at 2:19.990s for provisional pole position ahead of Nakamura and R-ace GP's Matteo De Palo, before improving by two seconds on his next lap. Naël and Boya briefly took second and third, with PHM Racing's Mattia Colnaghi then moving into the top three. Deligny looked set to improve again but lost time with a slide at R Bend, allowing Slater to grab the top spot with a 2:16.887s, ahead of Kato. A trip into the runoff for VAR's Kiyoshi Umegaki at Lisboa brought yellow flags, but Slater improved again while Naël and Boya moved up to P2 and P3. After Umegaki rejoined, Boya climbed to second before another yellow when PHM's Enzo Yeh mirrored Umegaki's mistake at Lisboa. Deligny then retook the top spot with a 2:16.297s, only for Naël to edge ahead by 0.04s just before the halfway mark. Drivers then pitted for fresh tires, and Slater was the first to benefit, reclaiming P1 with a 2:16.132s. A red flag followed when Yamakoshi hit the barrier at Lisboa. Once running resumed, Deligny briefly went fastest again before Trident's Reza Seewooruthun caused another stoppage by crashing in turn twelve. With just over five minutes left, everyone had one final attempt. Slater produced a superb 2:15.708s to secure P1 before a crash for Umegaki ended the session under caution. The final order saw Slater ahead of Deligny, Boya, Naël, and De Palo, followed by Colnaghi, Al Dhaheri, Kato, Trident's Noah Strømsted and Nakamura.

The second practice session on Friday morning took place in clear conditions. Provisional polesitter Slater posted the fastest time of 2:16.552s, leading Boya and Deligny in a session disrupted by three red flag stoppages. The first of those came after less than nine minutes for Le crashing out, before further off-track moments for Deligny and Charlie Wurz caused local yellows. The next red flag was caused by Evans GP’s Oscar Wurz crashing hard at Fishermen’s Bend, before the session ended early when VAR’s Zhenrui Chi crashed at the same corner. The top three cars were followed by Kato and Nakamura in fourth and fifth, with PHM's José Garfias sixth ahead of De Palo, Colnaghi and Al Dhaheri. Charlie Wurz brought up the rear of the top ten.

The second qualifying session on Friday afternoon again took place in clear, slightly hotter conditions. As on the previous day, the first laps were mainly for tire warmup, leaving the second lap as the first representative effort. Slater set the early benchmark with a 2:17.033s to lead Naël, while Boya briefly held third before being replaced by Giltaire. A short yellow in turn 16 interrupted lap three, though Naël still managed to improve and edge past Slater by 0.027s. Before the field could continue, Garfias slid off and crashed, triggering a red flag with 27 minutes remaining and necessitating a twelve-minute cleanup. Once running resumed, Boya was first to improve, moving into P3. On the next push lap, Colnaghi jumped to P1 with a 2:16.783s, and Giltaire returned to P2. Slater looked poised to respond with fastest sector times, but another red flag followed when VAR's Tymek Kucharczyk crashed. Action restarted with 18 minutes left, and Deligny immediately posted a 2:16.611s to take over at the top. Again, the field had little time to react before Wurz’s crash exiting turn 7 brought out the third red flag. With eleven minutes to go at the final restart, the session finally settled into a rhythm. Boya reclaimed P3, Naël delivered the first lap in the 2:15s for provisional pole, and Kato took over second. Deligny then produced a 2:15.959s, narrowing the gap to the front, before Naël responded again with a 2:15.609s, quicker than anyone had managed in Q1. Slater moved into P2, with Giltaire, Kato and Deligny completing the top five. Boya’s best lap from Q1 placed him sixth overall, followed by Colnaghi, Al Dhaheri, De Palo and Strømsted.

=== Qualifying classification ===
Each of the driver's fastest lap times from the two qualifying sessions are denoted in bold.

Final qualifying classification
Pos	No.	Driver	Team	Q1 Time	Rank	Q2 Time	Rank	Gap	Grid
1	6	(France) Théophile Naël	KCMG Enya Pinnacle Motorsport	2:16.048	4	**2:15.609**	1	—	1
2	11	(United Kingdom) Freddie Slater	SJM Theodore Prema Racing	**2:15.708**	1	2:15.876	2	+0.099	2
3	22	(France) Evan Giltaire	ART Grand Prix	2:17.765	16	**2:15.884**	3	+0.275	3
4	23	(France) Taito Kato	ART Grand Prix	2:16.886	8	**2:15.916**	4	+0.307	4
5	5	(France) Enzo Deligny	R-ace GP	2:16.016	2	**2:15.959**	5	+0.350	5
6	7	(Spain) Mari Boya	KCMG Enya Pinnacle Motorsport	**2:16.029**	3	2:16.088	7	+0.420	6
7	19	(Italy) Mattia Colnaghi	PHM Racing	2:16.685	6	**2:16.036**	6	+0.427	7
8	12	(United Arab Emirates) Rashid Al Dhaheri	SJM Theodore Prema Racing	2:16.733	7	**2:16.558**	8	+0.949	8
9	2	(Italy) Matteo De Palo	R-ace GP	**2:16.651**	5	2:16.676	9	+1.042	12^{1}
10	25	(Denmark) Noah Strømsted	Trident Motorsport	2:16.954	9	**2:16.832**	10	+1.223	9
11	15	(United States) James Egozi	Saintéloc Racing	2:17.079	11	**2:16.913**	11	+1.304	10
12	26	(Thailand) Tasanapol Inthraphuvasak	Trident Motorsport	2:17.479	15	**2:16.983**	12	+1.374	11
13	20	(Chinese Taipei) Enzo Yeh	PHM Racing	2:17.900	18	**2:17.001**	13	+1.392	13
14	3	(Japan) Jin Nakamura	R-ace GP	**2:17.046**	10	2:17.183	14	+1.437	14
15	21	(Mexico) José Garfias	PHM Racing	**2:17.104**	12	2:18.935	24	+1.495	15
16	10	(Japan) Hiyu Yamakoshi	Evans GP	2:18.947	24	**2:17.297**	15	+1.688	16
17	8	(Austria) Charlie Wurz	Evans GP	**2:17.359**	13	2:18.369	22	+1.750	17
18	29	(Poland) Tymek Kucharczyk	Van Amersfoort Racing	**2:17.474**	14	2:18.431	23	+1.865	18
19	17	(Japan) Yuki Sano	TOM'S Formula	2:18.974	25	**2:17.566**	16	+1.957	19
20	28	(Japan) Kiyoshi Umegaki	Van Amersfoort Racing	2:19.163	26	**2:17.783**	17	+2.174	20
21	16	(Vietnam) Owen Tangavelou	Saintéloc Racing	2:19.207	27	**2:17.785**	18	+2.176	21
22	24	(Japan) Kanato Le	ART Grand Prix	**2:17.790**	17	2:37.433	25	+2.181	22
23	31	(Macau) Charles Leong	SJM Theodore Prema Racing	2:18.000	20	**2:17.897**	19	+2.288	23
24	18	(Japan) Tokiya Suzuki	TOM'S Formula	**2:17.956**	19	2:18.311	21	+2.347	24
25	27	(United Kingdom) Reza Seewooruthun	Trident Motorsport	2:18.534	22	**2:18.181**	20	+2.572	25
26	30	(Italy) Newman Chi	Van Amersfoort Racing	2:18.317	21	—	26	+2.708	26
27	9	(Austria) Oscar Wurz	Evans GP	2:18.820	23	—	27	+3.211	27
Sources:

- **^1** – Matteo De Palo was handed a three-place grid penalty for impeding multiple drivers in the second qualifying session.

== Qualifying race ==
2025 Macau Grand Prix
- Qualifying Race

Race details
- Date: 15 November 2025
- Distance: 10 laps, 61.20 km (38.03 mi)
- Weather: Dry and clear

Pole position
Driver	(France) Théophile Naël	KCMG Enya Pinnacle Motorsport
- Time: 2:15.609

Fastest lap
Driver	(France) Théophile Naël	KCMG Enya Pinnacle Motorsport
- Time: 2:15.561 on lap 10

Podium
First	(United Kingdom) Freddie Slater	SJM Theodore Prema Racing
Second	(Spain) Mari Boya	KCMG Enya Pinnacle Motorsport
Third	(France) Théophile Naël	KCMG Enya Pinnacle Motorsport

The 10-lap qualifying race to set the main race's starting order commenced at 16.15 Macau Standard Time (UTC+08:00) on 15 November. Conditions at the start were cloudy, but dry, with the air temperature at 26 °C (79 °F). Slater made the better start of the two front-row drivers and instantly drew alongside Naël to take the lead into Reservoir Bend. Giltaire and Boya also moved past the polesitter into Lisboa, with Slater already a few car lengths away to end the first lap with a 1.6-second advantage. A stack-up into the Melco hairpin saw collisions at the rear of the field, with Oscar Wurz breaking his front suspension and retiring into the runoff area.

Boya attacked Giltaire for second place going into Lisboa on lap two, and at the same spot on lap four, but found no way past. That allowed Slater to further escape up the road as he set fastest lap after fastest lap, ending lap four 4.4 seconds in front. Boya was finally able to claim second place on his third try into Lisboa. Naël followed his teammate through into P3 one lap later as Kucharczyk ran off into the Lisboa escape road and dropped to the rear of the field.

Boya in second place remained unable to close up to Slater, with the Brit entering lap six leading by 5.7 seconds. Boya spent the final laps chipping away at Slater's lead, setting the fastest lap of the race so far in the process, but Slater's advantage was too big. He won the qualifying race by 5.1 seconds, with Naël in third taking the fastest lap on the final tour. Giltaire and Kato took P4 and P5, followed by Deligny, Colnaghi and Egozi as Al Dhaheri took the last top-ten spot. Post-race investigations for Slater and Deligny for speeding in the pitlane during the warmup ultimately ended in fines for the drivers, leaving the results unchanged.

Final qualifying race classification
Pos	No.	Driver	Team	Laps	Time/Retired	Grid
1	11	(United Kingdom) Freddie Slater	SJM Theodore Prema Racing	10	22:52.216	2
2	7	(Spain) Mari Boya	KCMG Enya Pinnacle Motorsport	10	+5.171	6
3	6	(France) Théophile Naël	KCMG Enya Pinnacle Motorsport	10	+5.674	1
4	22	(France) Evan Giltaire	ART Grand Prix	10	+10.140	3
5	23	(France) Taito Kato	ART Grand Prix	10	+11.444	4
6	5	(France) Enzo Deligny	R-ace GP	10	+12.050	5
7	19	(Italy) Mattia Colnaghi	PHM Racing	10	+13.192	7
8	15	(United States) James Egozi	Saintéloc Racing	10	+18.518	10
9	25	(Denmark) Noah Strømsted	Trident Motorsport	10	+19.212	9
10	12	(United Arab Emirates) Rashid Al Dhaheri	SJM Theodore Prema Racing	10	+19.832	8
11	2	(Italy) Matteo De Palo	R-ace GP	10	+21.004	12
12	21	(Mexico) José Garfias	PHM Racing	10	+21.890	15
13	26	(Thailand) Tasanapol Inthraphuvasak	Trident Motorsport	10	+23.383	11
14	3	(Japan) Jin Nakamura	R-ace GP	10	+23.832	14
15	24	(Japan) Kanato Le	ART Grand Prix	10	+24.941	22
16	10	(Japan) Hiyu Yamakoshi	Evans GP	10	+31.656	16
17	18	(Japan) Tokiya Suzuki	TOM'S Formula	10	+32.323	24
18	17	(Japan) Yuki Sano	TOM'S Formula	10	+33.880	19
19	8	(Austria) Charlie Wurz	Evans GP	10	+34.800	17
20	16	(Vietnam) Owen Tangavelou	Saintéloc Racing	10	+35.457	21
21	28	(Japan) Kiyoshi Umegaki	Van Amersfoort Racing	10	+36.561	20
22	27	(United Kingdom) Reza Seewooruthun	Trident Motorsport	10	+37.228	25
23	31	(Macau) Charles Leong	SJM Theodore Prema Racing	10	+37.572	23
24	29	(Poland) Tymek Kucharczyk	Van Amersfoort Racing	10	+53.242	18
25	20	(Chinese Taipei) Enzo Yeh	PHM Racing	10	+1:07.413	13
26	30	(Italy) Newman Chi	Van Amersfoort Racing	10	+1:36.610	26
Ret	9	(Austria) Oscar Wurz	Evans GP	0	Accident	27
Fastest Lap: Théophile Naël, 2:15.561, 101.0 mph (162.5 km/h), on lap 10

== Main race ==
The 15-lap main race began at 15:30 local time (UTC+08:00) on 16 November under clear and dry conditions, with an air temperature of 26 °C (79 °F). Saintéloc Racing's Owen Tangavelou was unable to start the formation lap, with his car pushed into the pits and his grid spot left vacant. Slater had positioned his car at an angle for the start, allowing Boya to draw alongside him into turn 1 before getting past, with Naël also drawing level with the Brit before dropping down to P4 into Lisboa. The field was clean through Lisboa, but Charlie Wurz was tagged from behind going into San Francisco Hill, causing a four-car pileup that took out Umegaki, Seeworuthun and Chi and saw the Safety Car deployed.

Boya led Slater and Deligny at the restart with twelve laps to go, and Slater used the slipstream to perfection to retake the race lead. He built a 0.8-second gap throughout the lap, enough to counter the tow on the straight into lap five. Slater built on that slight advantage lap by lap, with Boya dropping out of the slipstream by lap seven as Slater grew his gap to 1.5 seconds. The battle for third between Deligny and Naël behind remained close through that phase, with Naël drawing alongside into Lisboa lap after lap, but finding no way past. Once Boya was out of Slater's tow, his pace slowed, with Slater ending lap eight three seconds ahead. His efforts would be voided, however, as Oscar Wurz crashed into Lisboa to bring out the Safety Car for a second time, eradicating Slater's lead.

The field was released with five laps to go, and Boya mirrored Slater's efforts on the first restart to reclaim first place once again. Slater pushed hard to stay very close to Boya throughout the lap, but he hit the wall exiting R Bend, eliminating him from contention. That brought out the Safety Car for the third time and promoted Deligny and Naël to second and third. Two laps were left on the third restart, where Al Dhaheri got clipped on the straight, hitting the barrier with damage. Further ahead, Naël made a brilliant move to overtake both Deligny and Boya into Lisboa and claim the lead. TOM'S driver Tokiya Suzuki also made contact, ending the race in the Lisboa escape road with a broken suspension, while Nakamura and Prema's Charles Leong collided after Lisboa. These incidents caused a fourth and final safety car to end the race, with Naël winning ahead of Boya and Deligny.

Final race classification
Pos	No.	Driver	Team	Laps	Time/Retired	Grid
1	6	(France) Théophile Naël	KCMG Enya Pinnacle Motorsport	15	43:01.466	3
2	7	(Spain) Mari Boya	KCMG Enya Pinnacle Motorsport	15	+0.250	2
3	5	(France) Enzo Deligny	R-ace GP	15	+1.130	6
4	19	(Italy) Mattia Colnaghi	PHM Racing	15	+1.978	7
5	23	(France) Taito Kato	ART Grand Prix	15	+2.322	5
6	22	(France) Evan Giltaire	ART Grand Prix	15	+2.571	4
7	25	(Denmark) Noah Strømsted	Trident Motorsport	15	+3.606	9
8	2	(Italy) Matteo De Palo	R-ace GP	15	+4.140	11
9	17	(Japan) Yuki Sano	TOM'S Formula	15	+4.720	18
10	21	(Mexico) José Garfias	PHM Racing	15	+5.021	12
11	24	(Japan) Kanato Le	ART Grand Prix	15	+5.234	15
12	10	(Japan) Hiyu Yamakoshi	Evans GP	15	+5.538	16
13	29	(Poland) Tymek Kucharczyk	Van Amersfoort Racing	15	+5.837	24
14	15	(United States) James Egozi	Saintéloc Racing	15	+5.988	8
15	20	(Chinese Taipei) Enzo Yeh	PHM Racing	15	+6.686	25
16	26	(Thailand) Tasanapol Inthraphuvasak	Trident Motorsport	15	+7.689	13
17	16	(Vietnam) Owen Tangavelou	Saintéloc Racing	15	+7.971	20
18	8	(Austria) Charlie Wurz	Evans GP	15	+8.279	19
19†	3	(Japan) Jin Nakamura	R-ace GP	14	Accident	14
20†	12	(United Arab Emirates) Rashid Al Dhaheri	SJM Theodore Prema Racing	13	Accident	10
21†	31	(Macau) Charles Leong	SJM Theodore Prema Racing	13	Accident	23
22†	18	(Japan) Tokiya Suzuki	TOM'S Formula	13	Accident	17
Ret	11	(United Kingdom) Freddie Slater	SJM Theodore Prema Racing	11	Accident	1
Ret	9	(Austria) Oscar Wurz	Evans GP	8	Accident	27
Ret	28	(Japan) Kiyoshi Umegaki	Van Amersfoort Racing	0	Accident	21
Ret	27	(United Kingdom) Reza Seewooruthun	Trident Motorsport	0	Accident	22
Ret	30	(Italy) Newman Chi	Van Amersfoort Racing	0	Accident	26
Fastest Lap: Freddie Slater, 2:15.702, 100.8 mph (162.3 km/h), on lap 8
Sources:

- † – Driver did not finish the race, but was still classified as they completed more than 85% of the race distance.

== See also ==
- 2025 FIA GT World Cup
- 2025 Macau Guia Race
- 2025 FIA F4 World Cup
