= Kiyoshi Umegaki =

Japanese racing driver

- Nationality: (Japan) Japanese
- Born: 13 December 2007 (age 18) Japan

Previous series
- 2025 2024-25: Formula Regional Japanese Championship; F4 Japanese Championship

Championship titles
- 2025: Formula Regional Japanese Championship

Kiyoshi Umegaki (梅垣 清, Umegaki Kiyoshi; born 13 December 2007) is a Japanese racing driver competing in F4 Japanese Championship and Formula Regional Japanese Championship.

== Career ==
=== Formula 4 ===
Umegaki joined TGR-DC Racing School for his maiden formula racing in 2024. He continued race in the series with the same team for 2025.

=== Formula Regional Japanese Championship ===
Alongside his Formula 4 campaign, Umegaki raced in the Formula Regional Japanese Championship with TOM'S.

Umegaki also raced in Macau Grand Prix with Van Amersfoort Racing.

=== Super Formula Lights ===
In 2026, Umegaki will make his Super Formula Lights debut with TOM'S.

=== Super GT ===
In 2026, Umegaki will compete in Super GT GT300 with CarGuy MKS Racing.

== Racing record ==
=== Career summary ===
| Season | Series | Team | Races | Wins | Poles | FLaps | Podiums | Points | Position |
|---|---|---|---|---|---|---|---|---|---|
| 2024 | F4 Japanese Championship | TGR-DC Racing School | 13 | 0 | 0 | 1 | 0 | 78 | 7th |
| 2025 | Formula Regional Japanese Championship | TOM'S Formula | 15 | 7 | 5 | 5 | 12 | 280 | **1st** |
| 2025 | F4 Japanese Championship | TGR-DC Racing School | 14 | 0 | 0 | 0 | 2 | 89 | 7th |
| 2025 | Macau Grand Prix | Van Amersfoort Racing | 1 | 0 | 0 | 0 | 0 | —N/a | DNF |
| 2026 | Super Formula Lights | TOM'S | 18 | 3 | 3 | 3 | 11 | 87 | **3rd** |
| 2026 | Super GT - GT300 | CarGuy MKS Racing | 7 | 0 | 0 | 0 | 2 | 63 | 7th |
| 2026 | Super Taikyu - ST-2 | KTMS | | | | | | ‡ | ‡ |
| 2026 | Macau Grand Prix | TOM'S Racing | 0 | 0 | 0 | 0 | 0 | —N/a | TBD |

=== Complete F4 Japanese Championship results ===
(key) (Races in bold indicate pole position) (Races in italics indicate fastest lap)

| Year | Team | 1 | 2 | 3 | 4 | 5 | 6 | 7 | 8 | 9 | 10 | 11 | 12 | 13 | 14 | DC | Pts |
|---|---|---|---|---|---|---|---|---|---|---|---|---|---|---|---|---|---|
| 2024 | TGR-DC Racing School | FUJ1; 1 Ret | FUJ1; 2 DNS | SUZ; 1; 6 | SUZ; 2; 7 | FUJ2; 1; 9 | FUJ2; 2; 5 | SUG; 1; 6 | SUG; 2; 10 | AUT; 1; 5 | MOT; 1; 5 | MOT; 2; 6 | MOT; 3; 8 | SUZ2; 1; 9 | SUZ2; 2; 4 | 7th | 78 |
| 2025 | TGR-DC Racing School | FUJ1; 1; 2 | FUJ1; 2; 10 | FUJ1; 3; 4 | FUJ2; 1; 25 | FUJ2; 2; 9 | SUZ; 1; 25 | SUZ; 2; 11 | SUG; 1; 6 | SUG; 2; 7 | SUG; 3; 4 | AUT; 1; 11 | AUT; 2; 11 | MOT; 1; 4 | MOT; 2; 2 | 7th | 89 |

=== Complete Formula Regional Japanese Championship results ===
(key) (Races in bold indicate pole position) (Races in italics indicate fastest lap)

| Year | Entrant | 1 | 2 | 3 | 4 | 5 | 6 | 7 | 8 | 9 | 10 | 11 | 12 | 13 | 14 | 15 | Pos | Points |
|---|---|---|---|---|---|---|---|---|---|---|---|---|---|---|---|---|---|---|
| 2025 | TOM'S Formula | OKA; 1; 4 | OKA; 2; 1 | OKA; 3; 3 | **FUJ1**; **1**; 2 | **FUJ1**; **2**; 1 | **SUZ1**; **1**; 7 | **SUZ1**; **2**; 1 | SUG; 1; 3 | SUG; 2; 1 | SUG; 3; 1 | FUJ2; 1; 1 | **FUJ2**; **2**; 1 | SUZ2; 1; 3 | SUZ2; 2; 2 | SUZ2; 3; 4 | 1st | 280 |

=== Complete Macau Grand Prix results ===
| Year | Team | Car | Qualifying | Quali Race | Main Race |
|---|---|---|---|---|---|
| 2025 | (Netherlands) Van Amersfoort Racing | Tatuus F3 T-318 | 20th | 21st | DNF |
| 2026 | (Japan) TOM'S Racing | Tatuus T-326 | TBD | TBD | TBD |

=== Complete Super Formula Lights results ===
(key) (Races in bold indicate pole position) (Races in italics indicate fastest lap)

| Year | Entrant | 1 | 2 | 3 | 4 | 5 | 6 | 7 | 8 | 9 | 10 | 11 | 12 | 13 | 14 | 15 | 16 | 17 | 18 | Pos | Points |
|---|---|---|---|---|---|---|---|---|---|---|---|---|---|---|---|---|---|---|---|---|---|
| 2026 | TOM'S | FUJ; 1; 2 | **FUJ**; **2**; 3 | FUJ; 3; 2 | AUT; 1; 6 | AUT; 2; 3 | AUT; 3; 5 | **SUZ**; **1**; 1 | **SUZ**; **2**; 1 | SUZ; 3; 1 | OKA; 1; 2 | OKA; 2; 3 | OKA; 3; 2 | SUG; 1; 5 | SUG; 2; 10 | SUG; 3; 5 | MOT; 1; 8 | MOT; 2; 3 | MOT; 3; 7 | 3rd | 87 |

=== Complete Super GT results ===
(key) (Races in bold indicate pole position; races in italics indicate fastest lap)

| Year | Team | Car | Class | 1 | 2 | 3 | 4 | 5 | 6 | 7 | 8 | DC | Points |
|---|---|---|---|---|---|---|---|---|---|---|---|---|---|
| 2026 | CarGuy MKS Racing | Ferrari 296 GT3 Evo | GT300 | OKA | FUJ; 11 | FUJ; 3 | SUZ; 2 | SUG; 13 | AUT; 7 | MOT; Ret | MOT; 6 | 7th | 63 |
