= 2025 F4 Japanese Championship =

Formula 4 championship

The 2025 F4 Japanese Championship season was the eleventh season of the F4 Japanese Championship.

This was the second season for the second-generation MCSC-24 chassis constructed by Toray Carbon Magic, and TOM'S TMA43 engine which produces 180 horsepower.

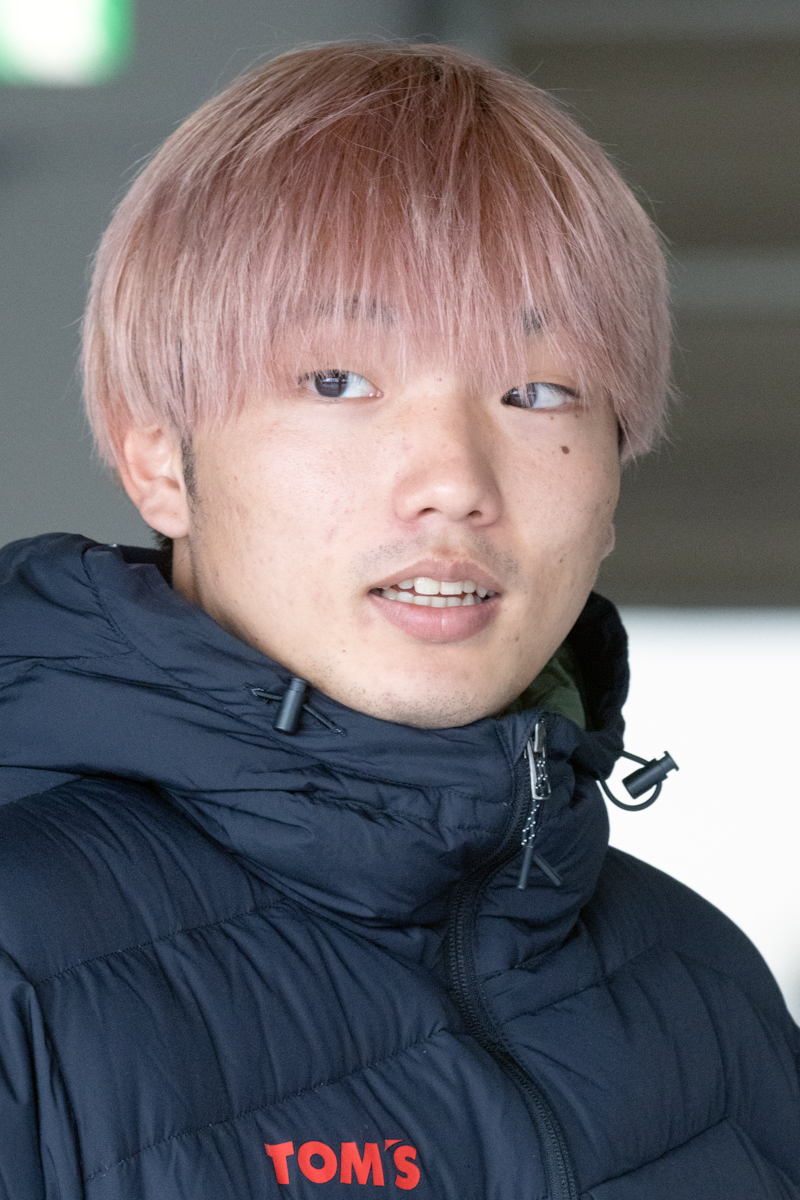
Tokiya Suzuki, driving for TGR-DC Racing School, won the F4 Japanese title.

== Teams and drivers ==
All teams competed with an identical Toray Carbon Magic MCSC-24 chassis and TOM'S 2-litre naturally aspirated engine.

Team	No.	Driver	Rounds
Champion Class
Team 5ZIGEN	3	(Japan) Sena Yamamoto	1–3, 6
Buzz Racing	7	(Japan) Aoto Nagahara	3, 5
TGM Grand Prix	8	(Japan) Leon Ochiai	All
TGM Grand Prix	53	(Japan) Shota Sakai	All
Zap Speed	14	(Japan) Masaki Murata	All
HYDRANGEA Kageyama Racing	15	(Japan) Ryusho Nakazato	2–6
HYDRANGEA Kageyama Racing	16	(Japan) Ryo Shirasaki	All
HYDRANGEA Kageyama Racing	17	(Japan) Itsuki Sato	All
Akiland Racing	19	(Japan) Keito Matsui	All
TGR-DC Racing School	28	(Japan) Kiyoshi Umegaki	All
TGR-DC Racing School	29	(Japan) Tokiya Suzuki	All
TGR-DC Racing School	35	(Japan) Megumu Suzuki	All
TGR-DC Racing School	36	(Japan) Takahiro Kikuchi	All
TGR-DC Racing School	37	(Japan) Masana Muto	All
TGR-DC Racing School	38	(Japan) Yuzuki Miura	All
Drago Corse	33	(Japan) Yuta Suzuki	All
Drago Corse	34	(Japan) Fuki Tanaka	All
B-Max Racing Team (Note: Car No. 43 & No. 52 entered as B-Max Racing Team, and car No. 50 & No. 51 entered as HFDP with B-Max Racing Team.) HFDP with B-Max Racing Team	43	(Japan) Tosei Moriyama	All
B-Max Racing Team HFDP with B-Max Racing Team	50	(Japan) Kotaro Shimbara	All
B-Max Racing Team HFDP with B-Max Racing Team	51	(Japan) Syo Momose	All
B-Max Racing Team HFDP with B-Max Racing Team	52	(Japan) Ayato Iwasaki	All
Ponos Racing	45	(Japan) Ryota Horachi	All
Ponos Racing	54	(Japan) Ryuma Sako	All
Fujita Yakkyoku Racing	46	(Japan) Shouma Arimura	All
Ragno Motor Sports	48	(China) Lin Chenghua	1–2
Ragno Motor Sports	48	(Japan) Kaoru Yoshida	4
OTG Motor Sports	60	(Japan) Kenta Kumagai	All
OTG Motor Sports	80	(Japan) Miki Onaga	All
HELM Motorsports	62	(Japan) Haruto Nakai	All
HELM Motorsports	63	(Japan) Fuji Kishi	All
Skill Speed	77	(Japan) Yasumasa Kano	1
Dr Dry Racing Team	87	(Japan) Rio Shimono	1–3, 5–6
Dr Dry Racing Team	87	(Japan) Rikuto Toyoshima	4
Bionic Jack Racing	97	(Japan) Ai Miura	All
Independent Class
Day Dream Racing	4	(Japan) Yuichi Sasaki	All
Team 5ZIGEN	5	(Japan) Motohiro Kotani	1–3, 6
Buzz Racing	6	(Japan) "Ken Alex"	All
Buzz Racing	7	(Japan) Hitoshi Sakai	1
Rn-sports	10	(Japan) Isao Nakashima	All
Rn-sports	11	(Japan) Masayuki Ueda	All
Rn-sports	74	(Japan) Kentaro Kojima	All
Eagle Racing	21	(Japan) Tadakazu Kojima	All
Eagle Racing	40	(Japan) Shoichiro Akamatsu	All
N-Speed	23	(Japan) "Yugo"	All
B-Max Racing Team	30	(Japan) "Dragon"	All
B-Max Racing Team	44	(Japan) Nobuhiro Imada	All
B-Max Racing Team	88	(Japan) Kazutaka Miura	2–4
B-Max Racing Team	88	(Japan) Yasuhiro Shimizu	5–6
Field Motorsport	55	(Japan) "Kentaro"	All
HELM Motorsports	61	(United States) William Sakai	All
HELM Motorsports	64	(Japan) "Go Shimizu"	1–3, 6
Akiland Racing	71	(Japan) Masayoshi Oyama	All
Akiland Racing	96	(Japan) Makio Saito	All
Dr Dry Racing Team	86	(Japan) Hachiro Osaka	All
Bionic Jack Racing	98	(Japan) "Ikari"	All

== Race calendar and results ==
All rounds are held in Japan and support the Super GT events in Japan, except for Okayama.

Round		Circuit	Date	Pole position	Fastest lap	Winning driver	Winning team	Independent Class winner
1	R1	Fuji Speedway, Oyama	3 May	(Japan) Ryo Shirasaki	(Japan) Itsuki Sato	(Japan) Tokiya Suzuki	TGR-DC Racing School	(Japan) "Kentaro"
1	R2	Fuji Speedway, Oyama	4 May	(Japan) Ryo Shirasaki	(Japan) Ryo Shirasaki	(Japan) Ryo Shirasaki	HYDRANGEA Kageyama Racing	(Japan) "Dragon"
1	R3	Fuji Speedway, Oyama	4 May		(Japan) Ryo Shirasaki	(Japan) Itsuki Sato	HYDRANGEA Kageyama Racing	(Japan) "Kentaro"
2	R4	Fuji Speedway, Oyama	2 August	(Japan) Itsuki Sato	(Japan) Tokiya Suzuki	(Japan) Itsuki Sato	HYDRANGEA Kageyama Racing	(Japan) "Dragon"
2	R5	Fuji Speedway, Oyama	3 August	(Japan) Itsuki Sato	(Japan) Itsuki Sato	(Japan) Itsuki Sato	HYDRANGEA Kageyama Racing	(Japan) "Dragon"
3	R6	Suzuka Circuit, Suzuka	23 August	(Japan) Kotaro Shimbara	(Japan) Tosei Moriyama	(Japan) Itsuki Sato	HYDRANGEA Kageyama Racing	(Japan) "Dragon"
3	R7	Suzuka Circuit, Suzuka	24 August	(Japan) Kotaro Shimbara	(Japan) Itsuki Sato	(Japan) Kotaro Shimbara	HFDP with B-Max Racing Team	(Japan) Nobuhiro Imada
4	R8	Sportsland Sugo, Murata	20 September	(Japan) Tokiya Suzuki	(Japan) Itsuki Sato	(Japan) Tokiya Suzuki	TGR-DC Racing School	(Japan) "Kentaro"
4	R9	Sportsland Sugo, Murata	20 September	(Japan) Tokiya Suzuki	(Japan) Itsuki Sato	(Japan) Tokiya Suzuki	TGR-DC Racing School	(Japan) "Kentaro"
4	R10	Sportsland Sugo, Murata	21 September		(Japan) Itsuki Sato	(Japan) Itsuki Sato	HYDRANGEA Kageyama Racing	(Japan) Nobuhiro Imada
5	R11	Autopolis, Hita	18 October	(Japan) Tokiya Suzuki	(Japan) Tokiya Suzuki	(Japan) Tokiya Suzuki	TGR-DC Racing School	(Japan) "Kentaro"
5	R12	Autopolis, Hita	19 October	(Japan) Tosei Moriyama	(Japan) Ryo Shirasaki	(Japan) Ryo Shirasaki	HYDRANGEA Kageyama Racing	(Japan) Nobuhiro Imada
6	R13	Mobility Resort Motegi, Motegi	1 November	(Japan) Kotaro Shimbara	(Japan) Kotaro Shimbara	(Japan) Kotaro Shimbara	HFDP with B-Max Racing Team	(Japan) Yasuhiro Shimizu
6	R14	Mobility Resort Motegi, Motegi	2 November	(Japan) Itsuki Sato	(Japan) Itsuki Sato	(Japan) Ryo Shirasaki	HYDRANGEA Kageyama Racing	(Japan) "Kentaro"

== Championship standings ==
Points were awarded as follows:

Position	**1st**	**2nd**	**3rd**	**4th**	**5th**	**6th**	**7th**	**8th**	**9th**	**10th**
Points	25	18	15	12	10	8	6	4	2	1

=== Drivers' standings ===
==== Champion Class ====
Pos	Driver	FUJ1			FUJ2		SUZ		SUG			AUT		MOT		Pts
Pos	Driver	R1	R2	R3	R4 (Note: Only five of the 14 laps were completed, less than 75% of the race distance, thus half points were awarded.)	R5	R6	R7	R8	R9	R10	R11	R12	R13	R14	Pts
1	(Japan) Tokiya Suzuki	1	3	3	26	7	3	6	**1**	**1**	2	**1**	4	2	4	219
2	(Japan) Itsuki Sato	11	2	1	**1**	**1**	1	2	2	2	1	2	5	Ret	**14**	212.5
3	(Japan) Ryo Shirasaki	**8**	**1**	23	3	3	7	10	4	3	3	4	1	7	1	168.5
4	(Japan) Kotaro Shimbara	21	6	13	2	2	**2**	**1**	13	5	16	8	8	**1**	7	127
5	(Japan) Ryota Horachi	5	5	24	7	4	4	4	14	12	Ret	7	6	3	5	98
6	(Japan) Syo Momose	6	21	6	4	5	6	3	9	11	6	6	3	13	6	96
7	(Japan) Kiyoshi Umegaki	2	10	4	25	9	25	11	6	7	4	11	11	4	2	89
8	(Japan) Tosei Moriyama	3	4	2	6	6	16	14	16	13	20	5	**2**	9	12	88
9	(Japan) Kenta Kumagai	Ret	Ret	17	10	13	5	5	3	9	5	10	9	12	18	50.5
10	(Japan) Ryuma Sako	12	11	8	5	8	24	8	12	4	18	20	24	6	11	37
11	(Japan) Megumu Suzuki	9	7	11	20	21	10	12	7	8	8	12	12	8	8	31
12	(Japan) Yuzuki Miura	14	13	Ret	22	15	27	9	15	16	14	15	10	5	3	28
13	(Japan) Leon Ochiai	23	14	10	11	11	26	Ret	5	6	7	19	15	Ret	9	27
14	(Japan) Ayato Iwasaki	4	19	5	24	10	13	15	23	15	17	13	13	17	20	23
15	(Japan) Masana Muto	15	Ret	DNQ	DNS	19	12	17	17	21	10	3	7	18	19	22
16	(Japan) Keito Matsui	10	Ret	12	19	22	8	7	8	14	12	WD	WD	15	Ret	15
17	(Japan) Yuta Suzuki	16	8	7	13	14	Ret	27	11	10	13	25	22	14	13	11
18	(Japan) Fuki Tanaka	7	Ret	Ret	12	12	Ret	23	18	18	15	17	16	10	10	8
19	(Japan) Takahiro Kikuchi	Ret	15	15	17	18	9	29	10	24	24	9	14	16	26	5
20	(Japan) Haruto Nakai	22	9	22	9	27	11	19	28	25	23	19	18	19	15	3
21	(Japan) Fuji Kishi	24	16	18	8	26	15	26	27	26	21	22	DNS	20	21	2
22	(Japan) Sena Yamamoto	20	12	9	21	16	14	18						25	25	2
23	(Japan) Rikuto Toyoshima								19	17	9					2
24	(Japan) Shota Sakai	18	18	14	23	23	23	13	22	24	11	16	17	23	16	0
25	(Japan) Masaki Murata	Ret	Ret	DNS	16	28	18	28	21	25	19	23	21	13	Ret	0
26	(Japan) Miki Onaga	13	Ret	20	18	20	22	24	20	23	Ret	21	19	22	23	0
27	(Japan) Ryusho Nakazato				14	25	19	16	24	Ret	26	Ret	23	27	Ret	0
28	(Japan) Rio Shimono	17	DNS	16	DNS	24	20	21				15	27	24	24	0
29	(Japan) Ai Miura	19	17	19	15	17	17	20	26	20	25	24	25	21	17	0
30	(Japan) Kaoru Yoshida								Ret	19	22					0
31	(Japan) Shouma Arimura	Ret	Ret	DNQ	DNQ	DNQ	28	25	25	22	27	Ret	20	26	22	0
32	(China) Lin Chenghua	DNQ	20	Ret	DNQ	DNQ										0
33	(Japan) Aoto Nagahara						21	22				26	26			0
34	(Japan) Yasumasa Kano	DNQ	DNQ	21												0
Pos	Driver	R1	R2	R3	R4	R5	R6	R7	R8	R9	R10	R11	R12	R13	R14	Pts
Pos	Driver	FUJ1			FUJ2		SUZ		SUG			AUT		MOT		Pts

Key
Colour	Result
Gold	Winner
Silver	Second place
Bronze	Third place
Green	Other points position
Blue	Other classified position
Blue	Not classified, finished (NC)
Purple	Not classified, retired (Ret)
Red	Did not qualify (DNQ)
Red	Did not pre-qualify (DNPQ)
Black	Disqualified (DSQ)
White	Did not start (DNS)
White	Race cancelled (C)
Blank	Did not practice (DNP)
Blank	Excluded (EX)
Blank	Did not arrive (DNA)
Blank	Withdrawn (WD)
Blank	Did not enter (cell empty)
Text formatting	Meaning
**Bold**	Pole position
Italics	Fastest lap

† — Did not finish but classified

==== Independent Class ====
Pos	Driver	FUJ1			FUJ2		SUZ		SUG			AUT		MOT		Pts
Pos	Driver	R1	R2	R3	R4	R5	R6	R7	R8	R9	R10	R11	R12	R13	R14	Pts
1	(Japan) Nobuhiro Imada	2	4	Ret	2	2	3	1	3	5	1	2	1	2	2	226
2	(Japan) "Kentaro"	**1**	3	1	3	Ret	5	**2**	**1**	**1**	Ret	**1**	**3**	5	1	225.5
3	(Japan) "Dragon"	Ret	**1**	5	**1**	**1**	**1**	3	2	2	3	4	Ret	13	3	190.5
4	(Japan) Masayuki Ueda	DNQ	DNQ	DNQ	6	3	2	4	5	4	5	3	4	6	15	116
5	(Japan) "Ken Alex"	4	15	2	5	5	4	13	15	11	2	7	5	**4**	**7**	109
6	(Japan) Isao Nakashima	3	2	3	4	8	Ret	Ret	4	3	9	8	Ret	10	11	92
7	(Japan) Shoichiro Akamatsu	8	13	Ret	11	7	6	7	8	8	6	6	6	7	5	72
8	(Japan) Makio Saito	5	8	4	Ret	4	8	Ret	6	6	4	11	12	14	10	71
9	(United States) William Sakai	7	6	7	8	Ret	9	9	10	9	8	Ret	8	3	4	64
10	(Japan) Yasuhiro Shimizu											5	2	1	9	55
11	(Japan) "Go Shimizu"	13	10	11	7	14	7	5						8	6	32
12	(Japan) "Ikari"	11	5	8	12	15	12	16	7	7	10	12	9	Ret	Ret	29
13	(Japan) Masayoshi Oyama	6	9	6	DNQ	DNQ	11	14	9	15	11	14	10	11	12	21
14	(Japan) Yuichi Sasaki	12	14	10	10	10	14	11	11	13	7	10	11	9	8	15.5
15	(Japan) Motohiro Kotani	Ret	7	Ret	Ret	12	15	6						12	14	14
16	(Japan) Kentaro Kojima	10	12	Ret	13	11	13	8	12	10	13	9	7	Ret	13	14
17	(Japan) Tadakazu Kojima	Ret	17	9	13	6	10	10	WD	WD	WD	WD	WD	WD	WD	12
18	(Japan) Hachiro Osaka	9	11	13	9	13	16	Ret	14	14	12	13	13	DNQ	DNQ	3
19	(Japan) Kazutaka Miura				14	9	Ret	12	13	12	14					2
20	(Japan) Hitoshi Sakai	14	16	12												0
21	(Japan) "Yugo"	DNQ	DNQ	DNQ	DNQ	DNQ	17	15	16	16	15	15	14	DNQ	DNQ	0
Pos	Driver	R1	R2	R3	R4	R5	R6	R7	R8	R9	R10	R11	R12	R13	R14	Pts
Pos	Driver	FUJ1			FUJ2		SUZ		SUG			AUT		MOT		Pts

=== Teams' standings ===
Only the best finisher scored points for their team.

==== Champion Class ====
Pos	Driver	FUJ1			FUJ2		SUZ		SUG			AUT		MOT		Pts
Pos	Driver	R1	R2	R3	R4	R5	R6	R7	R8	R9	R10	R11	R12	R13	R14	Pts
1	HYDRANGEA Kageyama Racing	8	1	1	1	1	1	2	2	2	1	2	1	7	1	269.5
2	TGR-DC Racing School	1	3	3	17	7	3	6	1	1	2	1	4	2	2	225
3	HFDP with B-Max Racing Team	6	6	6	2	2	2	1	9	5	6	6	3	1	6	168
4	Ponos Racing	5	5	8	5	4	4	4	12	4	18	7	6	3	5	116
5	B-Max Racing Team	3	4	2	6	6	14	14	16	13	17	5	2	9	12	87
6	OTG Motor Sports	14	Ret	17	10	13	5	5	3	9	5	10	9	11	18	49.5
7	TGM Grand Prix	18	14	10	11	11	23	13	5	6	7	16	15	23	9	27
8	Drago Corse	7	8	7	12	12	Ret	23	11	10	13	17	16	10	10	19
9	Akiland Racing	10	Ret	12	19	22	8	7	8	14	12	WD	WD	15	Ret	13
10	HELM Motorsports	23	9	18	8	26	11	19	27	26	21	18	18	19	15	4
11	Team 5ZIGEN	21	12	9	21	16	14	18						25	25	2
12	Dr Dry Racing Team	17	DNS	16	DNS	24	20	21	19	17	9	15	27	24	24	2
13	Zap Speed	Ret	Ret	DNS	16	28	18	28	21	25	19	23	21	13	Ret	0
14	Bionic Jack Racing	20	17	19	15	17	17	20	26	20	25	24	25	21	17	0
15	Ragno Motor Sport	DNQ	20	Ret	DNQ	DNQ			Ret	19	22					0
16	Fujita Yakkyoku Racing	Ret	Ret	DNQ	DNQ	DNQ	28	25	25	22	27	Ret	20	26	22	0
17	Buzz Racing						21	22				25	26			0
18	Skill Speed	DNQ	DNQ	21												0
Pos	Driver	R1	R2	R3	R4	R5	R6	R7	R8	R9	R10	R11	R12	R13	R14	Pts
Pos	Driver	FUJ1			FUJ2		SUZ		SUG			AUT		MOT		Pts

==== Independent Class ====
Pos	Driver	FUJ1			FUJ2		SUZ		SUG			AUT		MOT		Pts
Pos	Driver	R1	R2	R3	R4	R5	R6	R7	R8	R9	R10	R11	R12	R13	R14	Pts
1	B-Max Racing Team	2	1	5	1	1	1	1	2	2	1	2	1	1	2	287.5
2	Field Motorsport	1	3	1	3	Ret	5	2	1	1	Ret	1	3	5	1	225.5
3	Rn-sports	3	2	3	4	3	2	4	4	3	5	3	4	6	11	171
4	Buzz Racing	4	15	2	5	5	4	13	15	11	2	7	5	4	7	109
5	HELM Motorsports	7	6	7	6	14	7	5	10	9	8	Ret	8	3	4	77
6	Eagle Racing	8	13	9	11	6	6	7	8	8	6	6	6	7	5	76
7	Akiland Racing	5	8	4	Ret	4	8	14	9	6	4	11	10	11	10	72
8	Bionic Jack Racing	11	5	8	12	15	12	16	7	7	10	12	9	Ret	Ret	29
9	Day Dream Racing	12	14	10	10	10	14	11	11	13	7	10	11	9	8	15.5
10	Team 5ZIGEN	Ret	7	Ret	Ret	12	15	6						12	14	14
11	Dr Dry Racing Team	9	11	13	9	13	16	Ret	14	14	12	13	13	DNQ	DNQ	3
12	N-Speed	DNQ	DNQ	DNQ	DNQ	DNQ	17	15	16	16	15	15	14	DNQ	DNQ	0
Pos	Driver	R1	R2	R3	R4	R5	R6	R7	R8	R9	R10	R11	R12	R13	R14	Pts
Pos	Driver	FUJ1			FUJ2		SUZ		SUG			AUT		MOT		Pts
