= Tokiya Suzuki =

Japanese racing driver

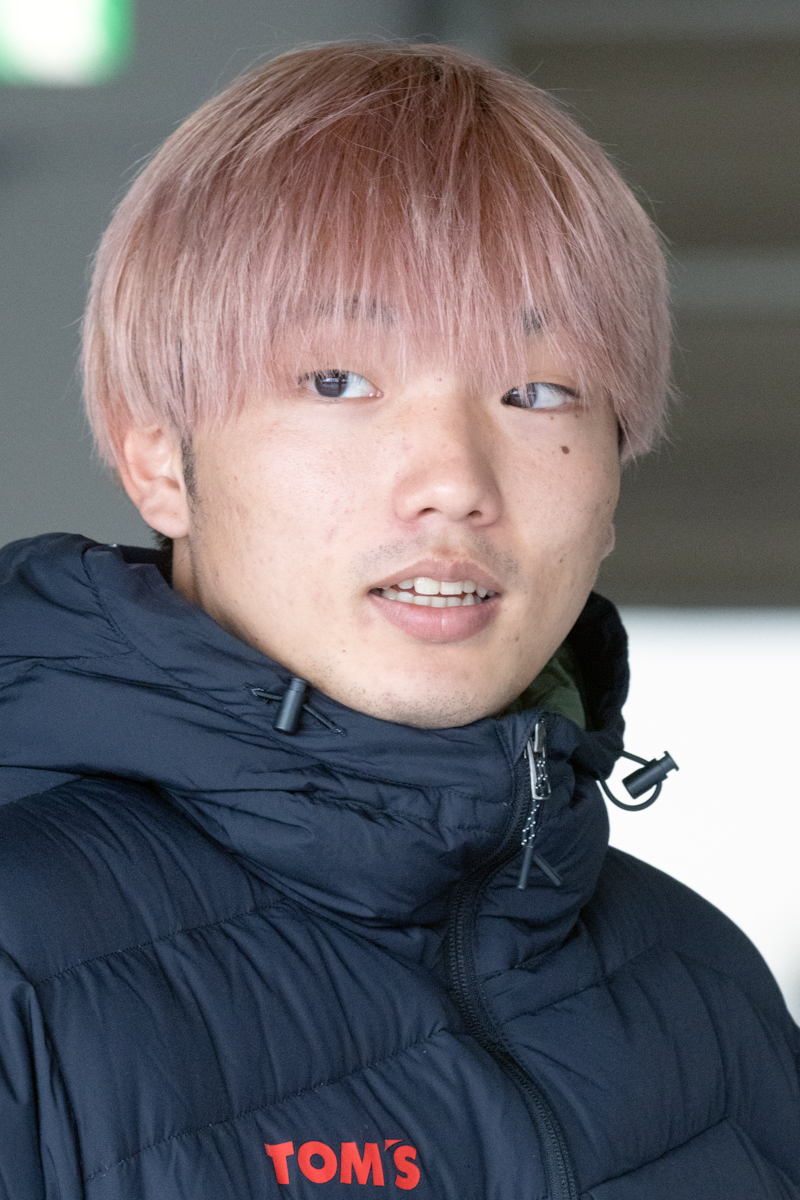
- Suzuki at Suzuka Circuit in November 2025
- Nationality: (Japan) Japanese
- Born: 8 December 2006 (age 19) Saitama, Japan

Previous series
- 2025 2024-25: Formula Regional Japanese Championship; F4 Japanese Championship

Championship titles
- 2025: F4 Japanese Championship

Tokiya Suzuki (鈴木 斗輝哉, Suzuki Tokiya; born 8 December 2006) is a Japanese racing driver competing in F4 Japanese Championship and Formula Regional Japanese Championship.

== Career ==
=== Formula 4 ===
Suzuki joined TGR-DC Racing School for his maiden formula racing in 2024. He continued race in the series with the same team for 2025.

=== Formula Regional Japanese Championship ===
Alongside his Formula 4 campaign, Suzuki raced in the Formula Regional Japanese Championship with TOM'S.

=== Other series ===
In 2025, Suzuki joined KTMS to race in Super Taikyu ST-2 alongside Riona Tomishita and Hibiki Taira.

== Racing record ==
=== Career summary ===
Season	Series	Team	Races	Wins	Poles	FLaps	Podiums	Points	Position
2024	F4 Japanese Championship	TGR-DC Racing School	13	0	0	0	0	47	10th
2025	F4 Japanese Championship	TGR-DC Racing School	14	4	3	2	9	219	**1st**
2025	Formula Regional Japanese Championship	TOM'S Formula	15	5	8	7	13	251.5	**2nd**
2025	Macau Grand Prix	TOM'S Formula	1	0	0	0	0	—N/a	22nd
2025	Super Taikyū - ST-2	KTMS	5	2	0	0	3	80‡	**2nd‡**
2026	Super Formula Lights	TOM'S	15	3	2	3	5	53	4th
2026	Super GT - GT300	Team ENEOS Rookie	7	0	0	0	1	32	21st
2026	Super Taikyū - ST-Q	GR Team Spirit						0‡	NC‡
2026	Formula Regional Japanese Championship	TOM'S TGR-DC	4	2	3	2	4	83	7th
2026	TGR GR86/BRZ Cup	AVANTECH racing team							
2026	Super Formula	Team Impul							

‡ Team standings

=== Complete F4 Japanese Championship results ===
(key) (Races in bold indicate pole position) (Races in italics indicate fastest lap)

Year	Team	1	2	3	4	5	6	7	8	9	10	11	12	13	14	DC	Pts
2024	TGR-DC Racing School	FUJ1; 1; 7	FUJ1; 2 DNS	SUZ; 1; 12	SUZ; 2; 13	FUJ2; 1; 5	FUJ2; 2; 16	SUG; 1; 5	SUG; 2; 7	AUT; 1; 6	MOT; 1; 10	MOT; 2; 16	MOT; 3; 7	SUZ2; 1; 16	SUZ2; 2; 7	10th	47
2025	TGR-DC Racing School	FUJ1; 1; 1	FUJ1; 2; 3	FUJ1; 3; 3	FUJ2; 1; 26	FUJ2; 2; 7	SUZ; 1; 3	SUZ; 2; 6	**SUG**; **1**; 1	**SUG**; **2**; 1	SUG; 3; 2	**AUT**; **1**; 1	AUT; 2; 4	MOT; 1; 2	MOT; 2; 4	1st	219

=== Complete Formula Regional Japanese Championship results ===
(key) (Races in bold indicate pole position) (Races in italics indicate fastest lap)

Year	Entrant	1	2	3	4	5	6	7	8	9	10	11	12	13	14	15	Pos	Points
2025	TOM'S Formula	**OKA**; **1**; 1	**OKA**; **2**; 2	**OKA**; **3**; 1	FUJ1; 1; 1	FUJ1; 2; 2	SUZ1; 1; 8	SUZ1; 2; 2	**SUG**; **1**; 1	**SUG**; **2**; 2	**SUG**; **3**; 3	**FUJ2**; **1**; 2	FUJ2; 2; 3	**SUZ2**; **1**; 1	SUZ2; 2 Ret	SUZ2; 3; 3	2nd	251.5
2026	TOM'S TGR-DC	SUZ1; 1	SUZ1; 2	SUZ1; 3	SUZ2; 1	SUZ2; 2	MOT; 1	MOT; 2	SUG; 1	SUG; 2	SUG; 3	**FUJ1**; **1**; 1	**FUJ1**; **2**; 1	FUJ2; 1; 2	**FUJ2**; **2**; 3		7th	83

=== Complete Macau Grand Prix results ===
Year	Team	Car	Qualifying	Quali Race	Main Race
2025	(Japan) TOM'S Formula	Tatuus F3 T-318	24th	17th	22nd

=== Complete Super Formula Lights results ===
(key) (Races in bold indicate pole position) (Races in italics indicate fastest lap)

Year	Entrant	1	2	3	4	5	6	7	8	9	10	11	12	13	14	15	16	17	18	Pos	Points
2026	TOM'S	FUJ; 1; 9	FUJ; 2; 4	FUJ; 3; 6	AUT; 1 WD	AUT; 2 WD	AUT; 3 WD	SUZ; 1; 8	SUZ; 2; 2	SUZ; 3; 3	OKA; 1; 8	OKA; 2; 5	OKA; 3; 5	**SUG**; **1**; 1	**SUG**; **2**; 1	SUG; 3; 1	MOT; 1; 6	MOT; 2; 4	MOT; 3; 5	4th	53

=== Complete Super GT results ===
(key) (Races in bold indicate pole position; races in italics indicate fastest lap)

Year	Team	Car	Class	1	2	3	4	5	6	7	8	DC	Points
2026	Team ENEOS Rookie	Mercedes-AMG GT3 Evo	GT300	OKA; 16	FUJ	FUJ; 2	SUZ; 10	SUG; Ret	AUT; 10			21st	32
2026	Team ENEOS Rookie	Toyota GR GT3	GT300							MOT; 19	MOT; 24	21st	32
