= Théophile Naël =

French racing driver (born 2007)

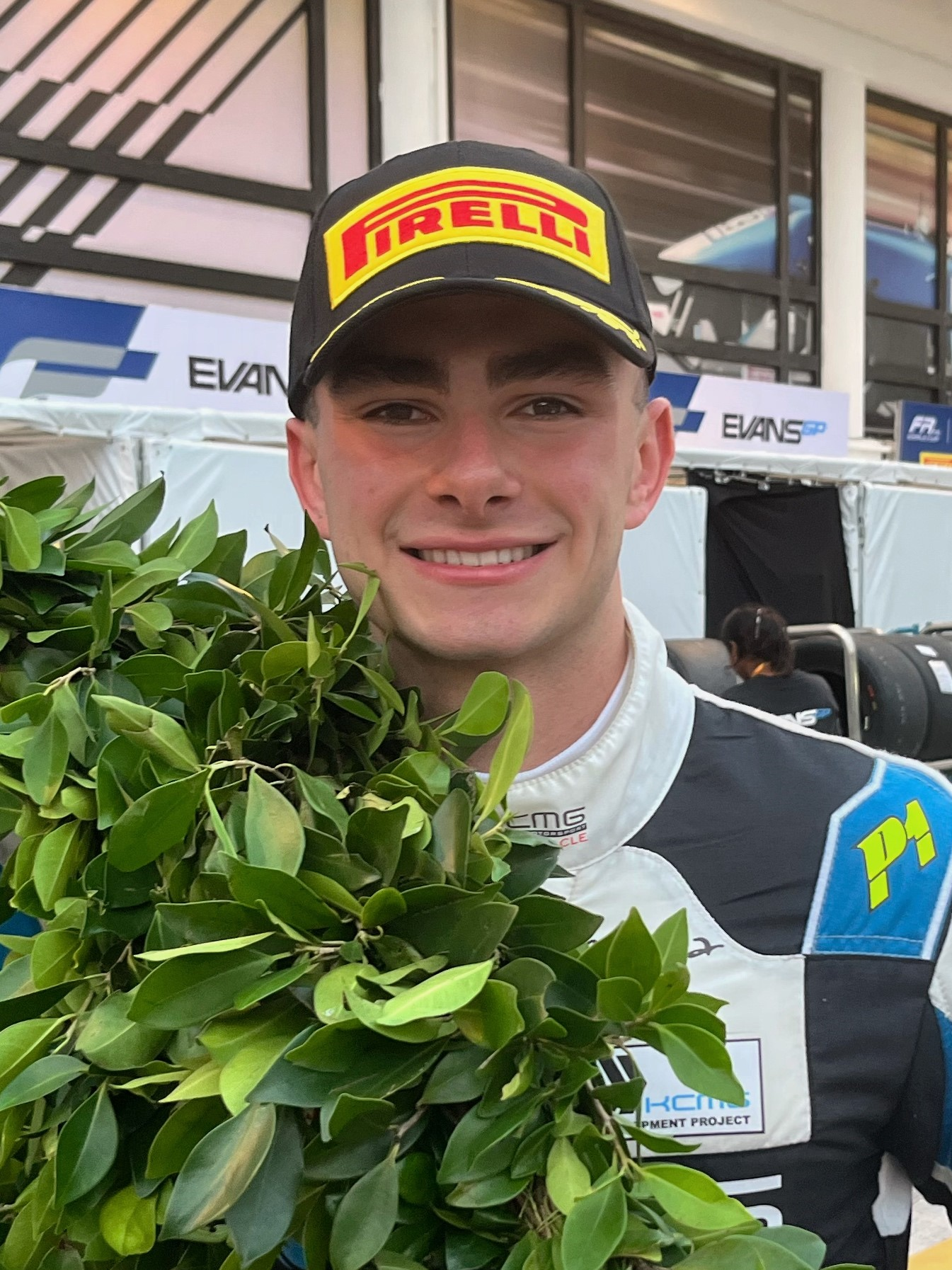
- Naël at the 2025 Macau Grand Prix
- Nationality: (France) French
- Born: Théophile Guy Yannick Naël; 22 June 2007 (age 19) Saint-Étienne, Loire, France

FIA Formula 3 Championship career
- Debut season: 2025
- Current team: Campos Racing
- Car number: 1
- Former teams: Van Amersfoort Racing
- Starts: 38
- Wins: 3
- Podiums: 8
- Poles: 3
- Fastest laps: 3
- Best finish: 5th in 2026

Previous series
- 2024–2025; 2023; 2022–2023: FR Middle East; F4 UAE; F4 Spanish

Championship titles
- 2025 2023: Macau Grand Prix; F4 Spanish
- Statistics up to date as of 15 September 2026.

Théophile Guy Yannick Naël (born 22 June 2007) is a French racing driver who last competed in the FIA Formula 3 Championship for Campos.

Naël is the 2023 F4 Spanish champion. He finished eighth in FIA Formula 3 with Van Amersfoort Racing in 2025 and also won the Macau Grand Prix that year.

== Racing career ==
=== Karting (2017–2021) ===
Naël was a successful karter in his national category, taking the crown in the 2018 French Championship, National Series Karting and in the 2020 IAME Series.

=== Formula 4 (2022–2023) ===
==== 2022 ====
Naël made his single-seater debut during the fourth round of the 2022 F4 Spanish Championship with Saintéloc Racing at Spa-Francorchamps, around a week after he had turned 15. Having achieved four points finishes with a high of eighth place, Naël ended 19th in the standings with eleven points.

==== 2023 ====
During 2023 pre-season, Naël was announced to drive in the 2023 Formula 4 UAE Championship with Saintéloc Racing. With multiple points finishes across the season, Naël placed 11th in the standings.

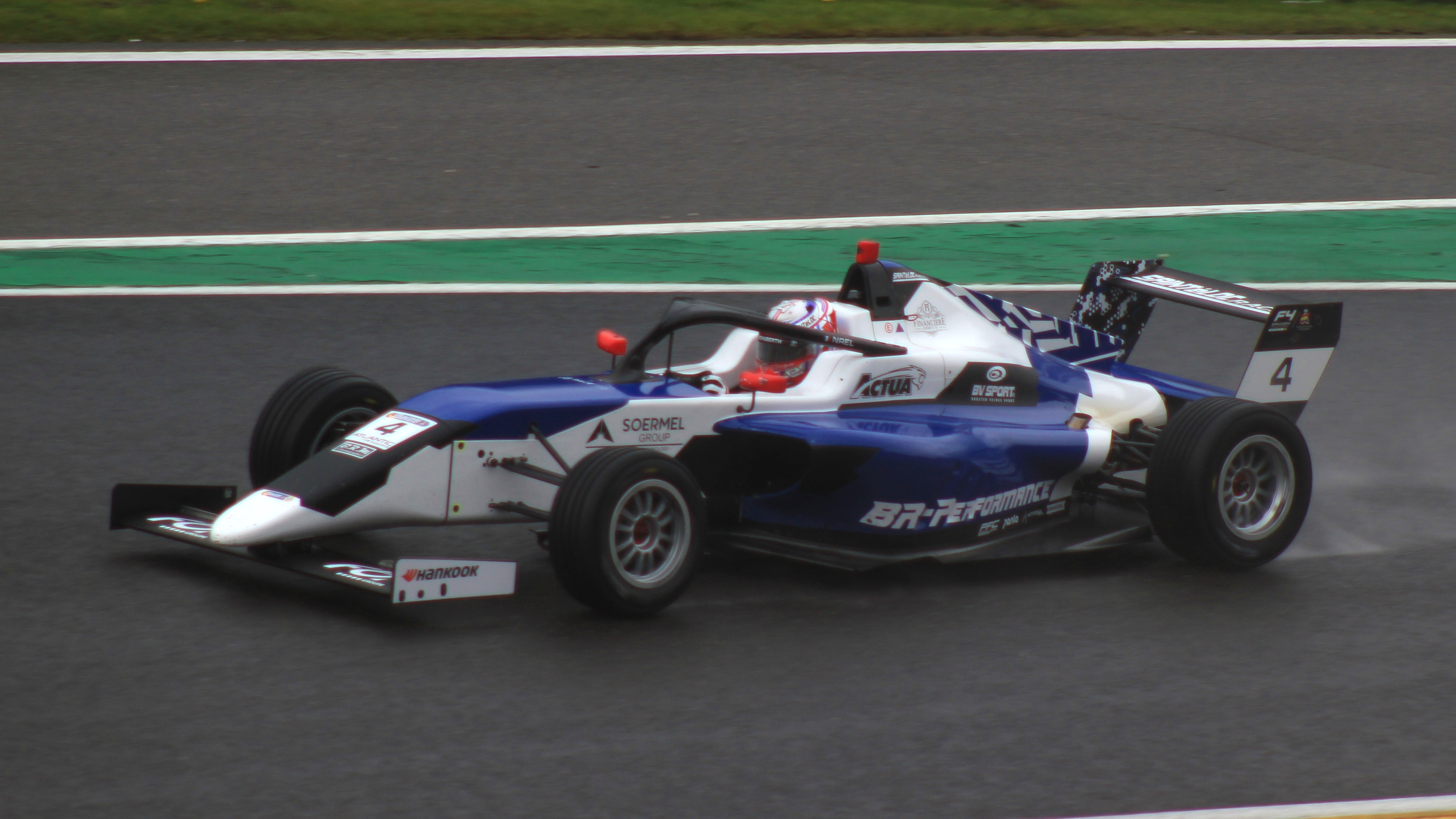
Naël driving at Spa-Francorchamps during the 2023 F4 Spanish Championship.

Naël's full-time campaign would lie in the 2023 F4 Spanish Championship, as he continued to drive for Saintéloc Racing. His first podium came only in the second race in Spa-Francorchamps, before taking his maiden car racing win the next round in Aragón. Naël then put on a dominant display over the next three rounds, winning the next six of nine races, propelling himself to the top of the standings. Another win the next round in Circuit Ricardo Tormo put him at the brink of the title. Despite a complete sweep by rival Christian Ho during the season finale in Barcelona, Naël's massive points lead allowed him to seal the title during the first race. He described his title win as "unbelievable" as he won against long-standing rivals Campos Racing and MP Motorsport. Naël achieved eight wins, five poles and fourteen podiums whilst harnessing 314 points, 23 ahead of rival Ho.

=== Formula Regional (2024–2025) ===
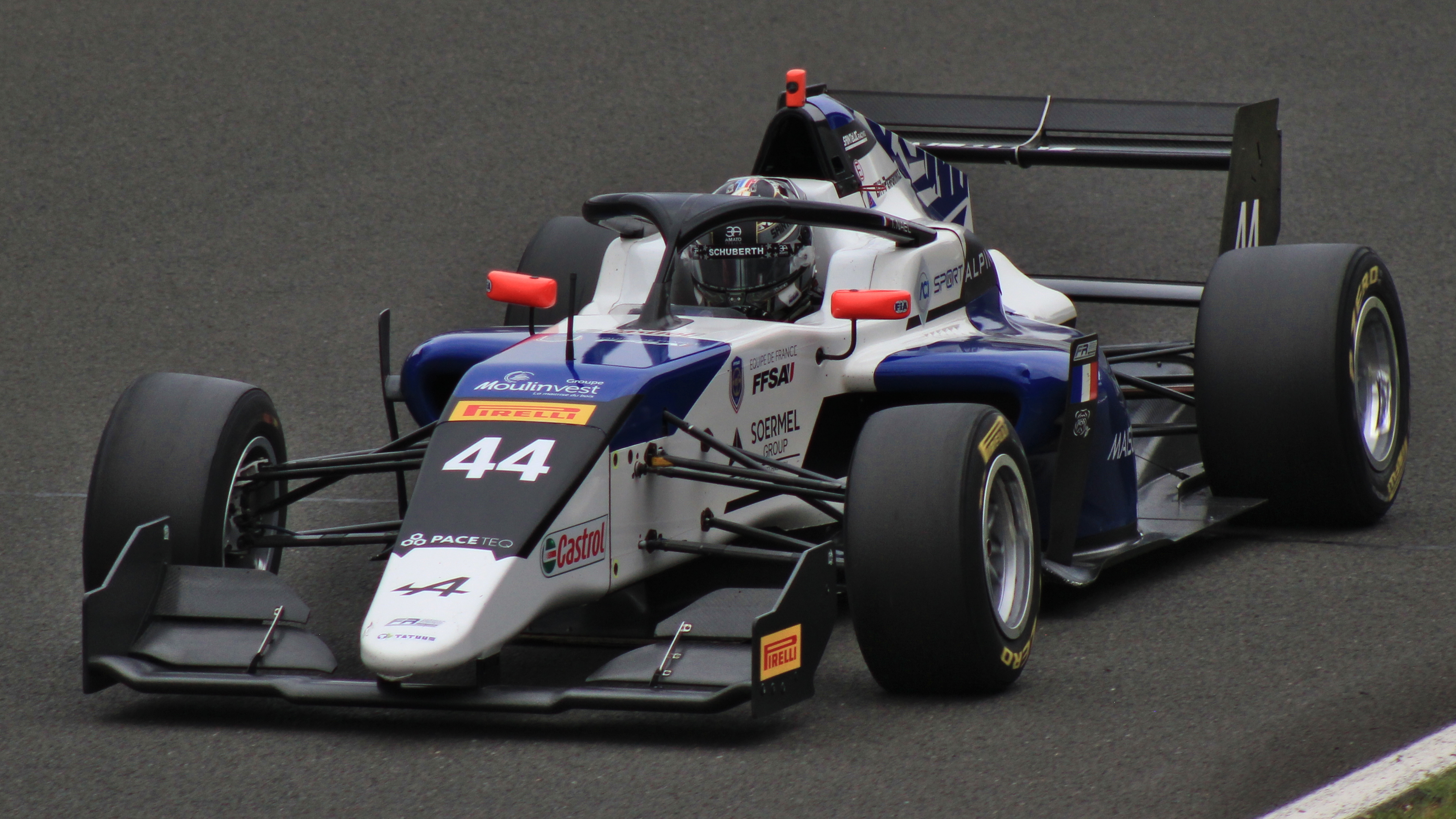
Naël driving in the 2024 Formula Regional European Championship at the Hungaroring

==== 2024 ====
Naël stepped up to the Formula Regional European Championship for 2024, continuing his relationship with Saintéloc Racing. Before that, he competed in the pre-season Formula Regional Middle East Championship with the team. He took his first Formula Regional win during the second round at Yas Marina and a further podium. Naël ended the season 11th overall.

In his main campaign, Naël had a sluggish first half with only three points finishes. However, his breakthrough came at the Red Bull Ring where he won the second race from third on the grid. He ended the season strongly with two fourth places in Monza, in which he even took his first pole in the final race. Naël ended his first FRECA campaign ninth in the standings with 81 points. He also partook in the Macau Grand Prix with Saintéloc. He finished 14th in the main race, but was later disqualified as his team crew had illegally started the car again when his car had stalled.

==== 2025 ====
Naël returned to Formula Regional during the winter, contesting the first three rounds of the Formula Regional Middle East Championship with Saintéloc Racing. He would get one podium in each round and finished the championship in 7th with 125 points.

=== FIA Formula 3 (2025–present) ===
==== 2025 ====
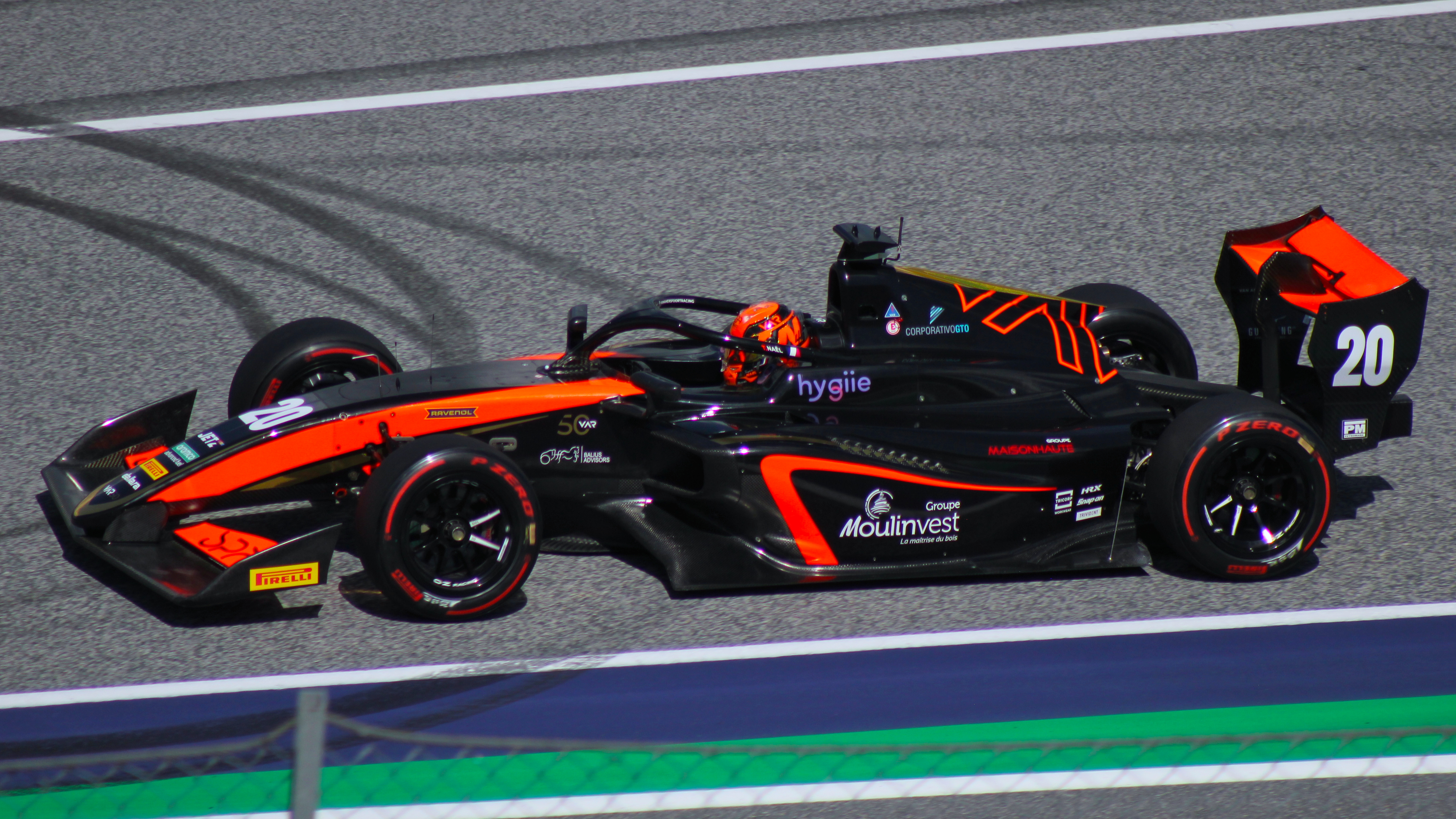
Naël driving the Dallara F3 2025 during the 2025 Spielberg Formula 3 round

In October 2024, Naël participated in the first round of FIA Formula 3 post-season testing at Jerez, with Van Amersfoort Racing. He would soon be confirmed as part of Van Amersfoort Racing's lineup for the 2025 season, alongside Santiago Ramos and Ivan Domingues. He began the season with third in qualifying for the Melbourne opener, He made up positions in the sprint race to finish in seventh, and held his position in a wet feature race to secure his maiden podium on debut in the series. This proved a false dawn, as he failed to score points after qualifying out of the top-12 for the next three rounds. Qualifying fourth in Barcelona, he moved up in the sprint race and improved to fifth position. He improved this feat in the feature race, making a move on Laurens van Hoepen during a late safety car, allowing him to take second place, marking his return to the rostrum.

After scoring a single point in Austria, Naël looked set for a win in the Silverstone sprint race, but dropped in pace towards the end and eventually finished fourth; post-race penalties for incidents with Tasanapol Inthraphuvasak and Van Hoepen dropped him to 19th place. He made amends for this in a damp feature race with a correct choice of tyres, as he secured another second-place podium after making up seven places on the opening lap. Hungary rewarded Naël with ninth and fifth in the races, despite being involved in a collision with Noel León in the earlier sprint race. Concluding the season in Monza with a tenth place, Naël finished his rookie F3 season eighth in the standings with 72 points, the highest VAR driver.

==== 2026 ====
Staying in the series for a second season, Naël switched to reigning champions Campos Racing for 2026.

=== Formula E ===
In March 2026, Naël will sample Formula E machinery during the Madrid rookie test with Mahindra Racing.

== Karting record ==
=== Karting career summary ===
Season	Series	Team	Position
2017	Rotax Max Challenge Grand Finals — Micro Max	Laurent Nael	34th
2018	Rotax Max Challenge Grand Finals — Mini Max	Nuvolini Stephen	21st
2018	French Championship — Cadet		1st
2018	National Series Karting — Cadet		1st
2019	CIK-FIA European Championship — OKJ		?
2020	IAME Series France — X30 Junior	2N Racing	1st
2020	IAME Euro Series — X30 Junior		3rd
2020	IAME International Games — X30 Junior	2N Racing	51st
2021	IAME Warriors Final — X30 Junior		3rd

== Racing record ==
=== Racing career summary ===
Season	Series	Team	Races	Wins	Poles	F/Laps	Podiums	Points	Position
2022	F4 Spanish Championship	Saintéloc Racing	12	0	0	0	0	11	19th
2023	Formula 4 UAE Championship	Saintéloc Racing	15	0	0	1	0	49	11th
2023	F4 Spanish Championship	Saintéloc Racing	21	8	5	5	14	314	**1st**
2024	Formula Regional Middle East Championship	Saintéloc Racing	15	1	0	0	3	75	11th
2024	Formula Regional European Championship	Saintéloc Racing	20	1	1	0	1	81	9th
2024	Macau Grand Prix	Saintéloc Racing	1	0	0	0	0	—N/a	DSQ
2025	Formula Regional Middle East Championship	Saintéloc Racing	9	0	0	1	3	125	7th
2025	FIA Formula 3 Championship	Van Amersfoort Racing	19	0	0	1	3	72	8th
2025	Macau Grand Prix	KCMG Enya Pinnacle Motorsport	1	1	0	1	1	—N/a	**1st**
2026	FIA Formula 3 Championship	Campos Racing	19	3	3	2	5	88	5th

* Season still in progress.

=== Complete F4 Spanish Championship results ===
(key) (Races in bold indicate pole position) (Races in italics indicate fastest lap)

Year	Team	1	2	3	4	5	6	7	8	9	10	11	12	13	14	15	16	17	18	19	20	21	DC	Points
2022	Saintéloc Racing	ALG; 1	ALG; 2	ALG; 3	JER; 1	JER; 2	JER; 3	CRT; 1	CRT; 2	CRT; 3	SPA; 1; 24	SPA; 2; 12	SPA; 3 Ret	ARA; 1; 8	ARA; 2; 23	ARA; 3; 21†	NAV; 1; 11	NAV; 2; 10	NAV; 3; 8	CAT; 1; 15	CAT; 2; 11	CAT; 3; 9	19th	11
2023	Saintéloc Racing	SPA; 1; 7	SPA; 2; 3	SPA; 3; 6	ARA; 1; 5	ARA; 2; 3	ARA; 3; 1	NAV; 1; 1	**NAV**; **2**; 1	NAV; 3; 3	JER; 1; 1	JER; 2; 4	**JER**; **3**; 1	**EST**; **1**; 1	**EST**; **2**; 1	EST; 3 Ret	CRT; 1; 2	CRT; 2; 1	**CRT**; **3**; 19	CAT; 1; 3	CAT; 2; 18	CAT; 3; 2	1st	314

=== Complete Formula 4 UAE Championship results ===
(key) (Races in bold indicate pole position) (Races in italics indicate fastest lap)

Year	Team	1	2	3	4	5	6	7	8	9	10	11	12	13	14	15	DC	Points
2023	Saintéloc Racing	DUB1; 1; 7	DUB1; 2 Ret	DUB1; 3; 7	KMT1; 1; 4	KMT1; 2; 15	KMT1; 3; 8	KMT2; 1; 10	KMT2; 2; 9	KMT2; 3; 32	DUB2; 1; 26	DUB2; 2; 28	DUB2; 3; 6	YMC; 1; 28†	YMC; 2; 9	YMC; 3; 6	11th	49

=== Complete Formula Regional Middle East Championship results ===
(key) (Races in bold indicate pole position) (Races in italics indicate fastest lap)

Year	Entrant	1	2	3	4	5	6	7	8	9	10	11	12	13	14	15	DC	Points
2024	Saintéloc Racing	YMC1; 1; 13	YMC1; 2; 10	YMC1; 3; 6	YMC2; 1; 8	YMC2; 2; 1	YMC2; 3; 2	DUB1; 1; 10	DUB1; 2 Ret	DUB1; 3; 10	YMC3; 1 Ret	YMC3; 2 Ret	YMC3; 3; 12	DUB2; 1 Ret	DUB2; 2; 9	DUB2; 3; 3	11th	75
2025	Saintéloc Racing	YMC1; 1; 8	YMC1; 2; 2	YMC1; 3; 4	YMC2; 1; 9	YMC2; 2; 2	YMC2; 3; 4	DUB; 1; 4	DUB; 2; 7	DUB; 3; 3	YMC3; 1	YMC3; 2	YMC3; 3	LUS; 1	LUS; 2	LUS; 3	7th	125

=== Complete Formula Regional European Championship results ===
(key) (Races in bold indicate pole position) (Races in italics indicate fastest lap)

Year	Team	1	2	3	4	5	6	7	8	9	10	11	12	13	14	15	16	17	18	19	20	DC	Points
2024	Saintéloc Racing	HOC; 1 Ret	HOC; 2; 7	SPA; 1; 11	SPA; 2; 7	ZAN; 1; 17	ZAN; 2; 13	HUN; 1 DSQ	HUN; 2; 9	MUG; 1; 23	MUG; 2; 14	LEC; 1; 11	LEC; 2; 14	IMO; 1; 7	IMO; 2; 8	RBR; 1; 13	RBR; 2; 1	CAT; 1; 6	CAT; 2; 11	MNZ; 1; 4	**MNZ**; **2**; 4	9th	81

=== Complete Macau Grand Prix results ===
Year	Team	Car	Qualifying	Quali Race	Main race
2024	(France) Saintéloc Racing	Tatuus F3 T-318	8th	11th	DSQ
2025	(Republic of Ireland) KCMG Enya Pinnacle Motorsport	Tatuus F3 T-318	**1st**	**3rd**	**1st**

=== Complete FIA Formula 3 Championship results ===
(key) (Races in bold indicate pole position) (Races in italics indicate fastest lap)

Year	Entrant	1	2	3	4	5	6	7	8	9	10	11	12	13	14	15	16	17	18	19	20	DC	Points
2025	Van Amersfoort Racing	MEL; SPR; 7	MEL; FEA; 3	BHR; SPR; Ret	BHR; FEA; 15	IMO; SPR; 20	IMO; FEA; 26	MON; SPR; 16	MON; FEA; 22†	CAT; SPR; 5	CAT; FEA; 2	RBR; SPR; 11	RBR; FEA; 10	SIL; SPR; 19	SIL; FEA; 2	SPA; SPR; 22	SPA; FEA; C	HUN; SPR; 9	HUN; FEA; 5	MNZ; SPR; 10	MNZ; FEA; 18	8th	72
2026	Campos Racing	MEL; SPR; 10	**MEL**; **FEA**; 12	MON; SPR; 24	**MON**; **FEA**; 2	CAT; SPR; 8	**CAT**; **FEA**; 1	RBR; SPR; 15	RBR; FEA; 15	SIL; SPR; 3	SIL; FEA; 14	SPA; SPR; 6	SPA; FEA; 15	HUN; SPR; 1	HUN; FEA; 20	MNZ; SPR; 11	MNZ; FEA; 17	MAD; SPR; 1	MAD; FEA1; 9	MAD; FEA2; 12		5th	88

Sporting positions
Preceded by Nikola Tsolov	F4 Spanish Championship; Champion; 2023	Succeeded by Mattia Colnaghi
Preceded by Ugo Ugochukwu	Macau Grand Prix; Winner; 2025	Succeeded by Incumbent
