= 2025 Formula Regional Japanese Championship =

Motor racing competition

The 2025 Formula Regional Japanese Championship was a multi-event, Formula Regional open-wheel single seater motor racing championship held in Japan. The drivers competed in Formula Regional cars that conform to the FIA Formula Regional regulations for the championship. This was the sixth season of the series, promoted by New Pacific Sports Marketing Inc., and the 47th overall season of an FIA ladder series in Japan, dating back to the 1979 Japanese Formula 3 Championship.

Kiyoshi Umegaki and his team TOM'S Formula claimed the Drivers' and Teams' Championship, and AiWin driver Yutaka Toriba won the Masters' Class with five races to spare.

== Teams and drivers ==
All teams and drivers competed using the Dome F111/3 Regional F3 car, powered by an Alfa Romeo engine and on Dunlop tires.

Team	No.	Driver	Status	Rounds
(Japan) Rn-sports	10	(Japan) Hibiki Komatsu		6
(Japan) Rn-sports	11	(Japan) Yu Oda		All
(Japan) AiWin	13	(Japan) Yutaka Toriba	M	1–4, 6
(Japan) AiWin	13	(Japan) Ai Miura		5
(Japan) Eagle Sports	14	(Japan) Yuki Tanaka	M	1
(Japan) Eagle Sports	40	(Japan) Shoichiro Akamatsu	M	2, 5–6
(Japan) Nilzz Racing	18	(Japan) "Yuki"	M	2–3, 5–6
(Japan) Hitotsuyama Racing	21	(Japan) Anna Inotsume		All
(Japan) N-SPEED	23	(Japan) "Yugo”	M	2, 4–6
(China) Sky Motorsports	36	(China) Wang Zhongwei		2, 5
(Japan) TOM'S Formula	37	(Japan) Kiyoshi Umegaki		All
(Japan) TOM'S Formula	38	(Japan) Tokiya Suzuki		All
(Japan) Abbey Racing	44	(Japan) "Akita"	M	1–2, 5–6
(Japan) PONOS Racing	45	(Japan) Kento Omiya		All
(Japan) Fujita Yakkyoku Racing	46	(Japan) Hideaki Irie		All
(Japan) Ragno Motor Sport	48	(China) Lin Chenghua		2–3, 5–6
(Japan) B-Max Racing Team	50	(Japan) Kazuhisa Urabe		1–3, 5–6
(Japan) B-Max Racing Team	51	(China) Jia Zhanbin		All

Icon	Legend
M	Masters' Class

== Race calendar ==
The provisional calendar for the 2025 season was revealed on 20 January 2025. The championship did not race at Mobility Resort Motegi for the first time in its history, while its space in the schedule was replaced by a second round at Suzuka. With three double-header and three triple-header rounds, the race count increased to 15, one more than in 2024.

Round		Circuit	Date	Support Bill	Map of circuit locations
1	R1	Okayama International Circuit, Mimasaka	24 May	Porsche Carrera Cup Japan; Okayama Challenge Cup Race; VITA Race Okayama; SuperKart Okayama International Series	2025 Formula Regional Japanese Championship is located in Japan
1	R2	Okayama International Circuit, Mimasaka	25 May	Porsche Carrera Cup Japan; Okayama Challenge Cup Race; VITA Race Okayama; SuperKart Okayama International Series	2025 Formula Regional Japanese Championship is located in Japan
1	R3	Okayama International Circuit, Mimasaka	25 May	Porsche Carrera Cup Japan; Okayama Challenge Cup Race; VITA Race Okayama; SuperKart Okayama International Series	2025 Formula Regional Japanese Championship is located in Japan
2	R4	Fuji Speedway, Oyama	29 June	Lamborghini Super Trofeo Asia; Fuji Champion Race Series	2025 Formula Regional Japanese Championship is located in Japan
2	R5	Fuji Speedway, Oyama	29 June	Lamborghini Super Trofeo Asia; Fuji Champion Race Series	2025 Formula Regional Japanese Championship is located in Japan
3	R6	Suzuka International Racing Course, Suzuka	12 July	Suzuka Champion Cup Race; VITA Race Suzuka	2025 Formula Regional Japanese Championship is located in Japan
3	R7	Suzuka International Racing Course, Suzuka	13 July	Suzuka Champion Cup Race; VITA Race Suzuka	2025 Formula Regional Japanese Championship is located in Japan
4	R8	Sportsland Sugo, Murata	30 August	Super Formula Lights; SUGO Champion Cup Race Series	2025 Formula Regional Japanese Championship is located in Japan
4	R9	Sportsland Sugo, Murata	31 August	Super Formula Lights; SUGO Champion Cup Race Series	2025 Formula Regional Japanese Championship is located in Japan
4	R10	Sportsland Sugo, Murata	31 August	Super Formula Lights; SUGO Champion Cup Race Series	2025 Formula Regional Japanese Championship is located in Japan
5	R11	Fuji Speedway, Oyama	27 September	FIA World Endurance Championship (6 Hours of Fuji); Porsche Carrera Cup Japan	2025 Formula Regional Japanese Championship is located in Japan
5	R12	Fuji Speedway, Oyama	27 September	FIA World Endurance Championship (6 Hours of Fuji); Porsche Carrera Cup Japan	2025 Formula Regional Japanese Championship is located in Japan
6	R13	Suzuka International Racing Course, Suzuka	22 November	Super Formula Championship	2025 Formula Regional Japanese Championship is located in Japan
6	R14	Suzuka International Racing Course, Suzuka	23 November	Super Formula Championship	2025 Formula Regional Japanese Championship is located in Japan
6	R15	Suzuka International Racing Course, Suzuka	23 November	Super Formula Championship	2025 Formula Regional Japanese Championship is located in Japan

== Race results ==
Round		Circuit	Pole position	Fastest lap	Winning driver	Winning team	Masters' class winner
1	R1	Okayama International Circuit	(Japan) Tokiya Suzuki	(China) Jia Zhanbin	(Japan) Tokiya Suzuki	(Japan) TOM'S Formula	(Japan) Yutaka Toriba
1	R2	Okayama International Circuit	(Japan) Tokiya Suzuki	(Japan) Tokiya Suzuki	(Japan) Kiyoshi Umegaki	(Japan) TOM'S Formula	No finishers
1	R3	Okayama International Circuit	(Japan) Tokiya Suzuki	(Japan) Tokiya Suzuki	(Japan) Tokiya Suzuki	(Japan) TOM'S Formula	(Japan) Yutaka Toriba
2	R4	Fuji Speedway	(Japan) Kiyoshi Umegaki	(Japan) Kiyoshi Umegaki	(Japan) Tokiya Suzuki	(Japan) TOM'S Formula	(Japan) Yutaka Toriba
2	R5	Fuji Speedway	(Japan) Kiyoshi Umegaki	(Japan) Kiyoshi Umegaki	(Japan) Kiyoshi Umegaki	(Japan) TOM'S Formula	(Japan) Yutaka Toriba
3	R6	Suzuka International Racing Course	(Japan) Kiyoshi Umegaki	(Japan) Kiyoshi Umegaki	(Japan) Kazuhisa Urabe	(Japan) B-Max Racing Team	(Japan) "Yuki"
3	R7	Suzuka International Racing Course	(Japan) Kiyoshi Umegaki	(Japan) Kiyoshi Umegaki	(Japan) Kiyoshi Umegaki	(Japan) TOM'S Formula	(Japan) Yutaka Toriba
4	R8	Sportsland Sugo	(Japan) Tokiya Suzuki	(Japan) Tokiya Suzuki	(Japan) Tokiya Suzuki	(Japan) TOM'S Formula	(Japan) Yutaka Toriba
4	R9	Sportsland Sugo	(Japan) Tokiya Suzuki	(Japan) Tokiya Suzuki	(Japan) Kiyoshi Umegaki	(Japan) TOM'S Formula	(Japan) Yutaka Toriba
4	R10	Sportsland Sugo	(Japan) Tokiya Suzuki	(Japan) Tokiya Suzuki	(Japan) Kiyoshi Umegaki	(Japan) TOM'S Formula	(Japan) Yutaka Toriba
5	R11	Fuji Speedway	(Japan) Tokiya Suzuki	(Japan) Kiyoshi Umegaki	(Japan) Kiyoshi Umegaki	(Japan) TOM'S Formula	(Japan) Shoichiro Akamatsu
5	R12	Fuji Speedway	(Japan) Kiyoshi Umegaki	(Japan) Tokiya Suzuki	(Japan) Kiyoshi Umegaki	(Japan) TOM'S Formula	(Japan) "Akita"
6	R13	Suzuka International Racing Course	(Japan) Tokiya Suzuki	(Japan) Tokiya Suzuki	(Japan) Tokiya Suzuki	(Japan) TOM'S Formula	(Japan) "Akita"
6	R14	Suzuka International Racing Course	(Japan) Kazuhisa Urabe	(Japan) Hibiki Komatsu	(Japan) Kazuhisa Urabe	(Japan) B-Max Racing Team	(Japan) Yutaka Toriba
6	R15	Suzuka International Racing Course	(Japan) Hibiki Komatsu	(Japan) Hibiki Komatsu	(Japan) Kazuhisa Urabe	(Japan) B-Max Racing Team	(Japan) Yutaka Toriba

== Season report ==
=== First half ===
The 2025 Formula Regional Japanese Championship began in late May at Okayama with TOM'S driver Tokiya Suzuki claiming pole position for all three races. Rainy conditions impeded all three races of the weekend. The first race, started under safety car conditions, ended after five laps without the green flag shown. Half points were awarded for Suzuki's season-opening win ahead of B-Max Racing's Kazuhisa Urabe and PONOS Racing's Kento Omiya. Race two brought green-flag racing after three formation laps, during which Suzuki and Omiya were handed penalties after starting from the wrong grid spots. That saw the pair fail to retain their top-two finishing spots, with Kiyoshi Umegaki inheriting victory from his teammate and Rn-sports's Yu Oda completing the podium. Race three saw Suzuki win lights-to-flag, leading Omiya and Umegaki through an extensive safety car period and holding them off during the final three green-flag laps. Two wins saw Suzuki end the opening weekend leading Umegaki by 9.5 points in the standings.

A double-header at Fuji Speedway followed, and this time Umegaki swept qualifying to take two pole positions. He had a slow start to the first race, though, dropping down to fourth as Suzuki took the lead. Umegaki fought back, moving into third on the opening lap, before attacking second-placed Urabe. Multiple attacks ended with Umegaki running wide or off the track, before he finally got second place on lap nine. Urabe defended the final podium spot from Omiya. Umegaki converted his second pole position into a lead that would last for three turns, where Suzuki claimed the lead once again. This time, Umegaki was able to keep close to him all throughout the race, and he was able to get a slipstream exiting the final corner of the final lap to claim victory by 0.038s. Omiya took third as Suzuki's points lead over Umegaki remained static.

Two races at Suzuka closed out the first half of the season. Umegaki continued his qualifying streak by taking two more pole positions. Urabe qualified second for the first race, and started it by taking the lead into the opening corner as Umegaki went off and dropped to fourth behind Suzuki and Omiya. He fought back past the latter into third place, before a safety car came out. It was withdrawn with just two laps left, and fights broke out all across the order. A desperate lunge into the final chicane by Umegaki saw him collide with Suzuki, with his car riding over Suzuki's. That dropped both drivers out of contention, allowing Urabe to take the win ahead of Omiya and Oda. Race two was a calmer affair as Umegaki converted pole position into a lights-to-flag victory, leading Suzuki and Urabe to end the weekend leading the standings by 0.5 points over Suzuki.

=== Second half ===
Sportsland Sugo hosted three races four round four, and Suzuki claimed pole position for all three of them. He quickly established a lead in the first race, before a safety car brought Omiya and Umegaki back onto his tail. A faultless restart coupled with Omiya running deep and having to defend saw Suzuki rebuild his advantage, and he spent the rest of the race managing his lead. Omiya had a second moment later on, but was able to hold on to second place. A slow start to race two saw Suzuki drop behind Umegaki. He tried fighting back on lap two, but failed to make a move. A second try to retake the lead on lap eleven was also rebuffed by Umegaki, and further attacks on laps 16 and 18 also went without success as Umegaki went on to take victory. Omiya took third, having been part of the lead battle early on but dropping back in the latter stages. Suzuki had another bad start to race three, this time dropping to third behind Umegaki and Omiya. That order remained static until the finish, handing Umegaki the championship lead by 6.5 points.

The championship returned to Fuji for the penultimate round, where Suzuki and Umegaki claimed a pole position each in qualifying. Suzuki converted his pole position for the first race into the lead despite a bad start. Umegaki kept close behind him all race, but was unable to make a move for the lead. Suzuki crossed the line first, but a penalty for track limits saw him drop behind Umegaki. Urabe completed the podium behind them. Umegaki led race two from lights to flag, spending the first half having to defend from Suzuki, before the latter spun and dropped to third. That allowed Umegaki to pull away at the front and promoted Urabe to second. He held on to the place by just 0.06 seconds after Suzuki tried to slipstream past him on the final lap. Umegaki's double win saw him significantly extend his championship lead over Suzuki to 23.5 points.

Three more races at Suzuka formed the final round of the season. Suzuki was on pole position for the first race and he kept his lead while Umegaki dropped behind Urabe after starting in second place. With Urabe playing rear gunner for Suzuki by defending from Umegaki, the leader was free to gap the field and win the race, shortening Umegaki's lead to 13.5 points. Urabe started race two from pole position as Umegaki lost out to Omiya and Suzuki at the start. Suzuki attacked Urabe for the lead, but the pair made contact and Suzuki speared into the barriers. That caused a safety car, and Umegaki took second place off Omiya after the restart. With Suzuki retired, that was enough for Umegaki to clinch the championship. Race three pole position went to Rn-sports debutant Hibiki Komatsu. He lost his lead to Urabe at the start, but spent all race close behind him, attacking multiple times but not getting past. Suzuki finished a distant third, ahead of freshly crowned champion Umegaki.

Both Umegaki and Suzuki showed remarkable consistence, albeit in a field that lacked depth at some rounds. Umegaki only finished outside the top four once, while Suzuki was only off the podium twice, one of these occasions being his crucial retirement in the penultimate race of the season. While the pair was relatively evenly matched across the season, Umegaki took seven wins to Suzuki's five to ultimately come out on top. The top two were among only seven full-season entries as the championship continued its struggle for driver interest for another year.

== Championship standings ==
=== Scoring system ===
Points were awarded to the top ten drivers.

Position	**1st**	**2nd**	**3rd**	**4th**	**5th**	**6th**	**7th**	**8th**	**9th**	**10th**
Points	25	18	15	12	10	8	6	4	2	1

=== Drivers' championship ===
Pos	Driver	OKA			FUJ1		SUZ1		SUG			FUJ2		SUZ2			Pts
Pos	Driver	R1 (Note: Half points were awarded in the first race of round one as adverse weather conditions saw the race stopped after just four laps.)	R2	R3	R4	R5	R6	R7	R8	R9	R10	R11	R12	R13	R14	R15	Pts
1	(Japan) Kiyoshi Umegaki	4	1	3	**2**	**1**	**7**	**1**	3	1	1	1	**1**	3	2	4	280
2	(Japan) Tokiya Suzuki	**1**	**2**	**1**	1	2	8	2	**1**	**2**	**3**	**2**	3	**1**	Ret	3	251.5
3	(Japan) Kazuhisa Urabe	2	5	4	3	13	1	3				3	2	2	**1**	1	187
4	(Japan) Kento Omiya	3	4	2	4	3	2	4	2	3	2	4	Ret	4	3	Ret	184.5
5	(Japan) Yu Oda	10	3	10	Ret	Ret	3	6	Ret	6	4	7	6	6	5	5	101.5
6	(Japan) Anna Inotsume	5	6	6	Ret	10	6	10	5	8	7	9	8	7	6	8	75
7	(China) Lin Chenghua				5	4	4	5				6	5	15	Ret	6	70
8	(Japan) Yutaka Toriba	6	Ret	5	6	5	9	7	7	5	8			12	8	7	70
9	(China) Jia Zhanbin	9	7	Ret	7	7	Ret	9	4	4	5	11	9	11	7	9	65
10	(Japan) Hideaki Irie	7	8	8	8	9	Ret	8	6	7	6	10	10	9	9	11	49
11	(Japan) Hibiki Komatsu													5	4	**2**	40
12	(Japan) "Akita"	8	DNS	7	9	6						Ret	7	8	12	10	29
13	(Japan) Ai Miura											5	4				22
14	(Japan) "Yuki"				11	11	5	11				12	12	13	Ret	14	10
15	(Japan) Shoichiro Akamatsu				10	8						8	11	10	11	12	10
16	(Japan) "Yugo”				12	12			8	9	9	13	DNS	14	10	13	9
17	(Japan) Yuki Tanaka	DNS	Ret	9													2
—	(China) Wang Zhongwei				Ret	Ret						WD	WD				0
Pos	Driver	R1	R2	R3	R4	R5	R6	R7	R8	R9	R10	R11	R12	R13	R14	R15	Pts
Pos	Driver	OKA			FUJ1		SUZ1		SUG			FUJ2		SUZ2			Pts

Key
Colour	Result
Gold	Winner
Silver	Second place
Bronze	Third place
Green	Other points position
Blue	Other classified position
Blue	Not classified, finished (NC)
Purple	Not classified, retired (Ret)
Red	Did not qualify (DNQ)
Red	Did not pre-qualify (DNPQ)
Black	Disqualified (DSQ)
White	Did not start (DNS)
White	Race cancelled (C)
Blank	Did not practice (DNP)
Blank	Excluded (EX)
Blank	Did not arrive (DNA)
Blank	Withdrawn (WD)
Blank	Did not enter (cell empty)
Text formatting	Meaning
**Bold**	Pole position
Italics	Fastest lap

=== Masters' class standings ===
Pos	Driver	OKA			FUJ1		SUZ1		SUG			FUJ2		SUZ2			Pts
Pos	Driver	R1	R2	R3	R4	R5	R6	R7	R8	R9	R10	R11	R12	R13	R14	R15	Pts
1	(Japan) Yutaka Toriba	**1**	**Ret**	**1**	**1**	**1**	**2**	**1**	**1**	**1**	**1**			3	1	**1**	270.5
2	(Japan) "Akita"	2	DNS	2	2	2						Ret	**1**	**1**	**4**	**2**	143
3	(Japan) "Yugo”				5	5			2	2	2	3	DNS	5	2	4	129
4	(Japan) "Yuki"				4	4	1	2				2	3	4	Ret	5	122
5	(Japan) Shoichiro Akamatsu				3	3						**1**	2	2	3	3	121
6	(Japan) Yuki Tanaka	DNS	Ret	3													15
Pos	Driver	R1	R2	R3	R4	R5	R6	R7	R8	R9	R10	R11	R12	R13	R14	R15	Pts
Pos	Driver	OKA			FUJ1		SUZ1		SUG			FUJ2		SUZ2			Pts

=== Teams' championship ===
Only the best finishing driver of each team was eligible for teams' championship points.

Pos	Driver	OKA			FUJ1		SUZ1		SUG			FUJ2		SUZ2			Pts
Pos	Driver	R1	R2	R3	R4	R5	R6	R7	R8	R9	R10	R11	R12	R13	R14	R15	Pts
1	(Japan) TOM'S Formula	1	1	1	1	1	7	1	1	1	1	1	1	1	2	3	326.5
2	(Japan) B-Max Racing Team	2	5	4	3	7	1	3	4	4	5	3	2	2	1	1	227
3	(Japan) PONOS Racing	3	4	2	4	3	2	4	2	3	2	4	Ret	4	3	Ret	184.5
4	(Japan) Rn-sports	10	3	10	Ret	Ret	3	6	Ret	6	4	7	6	5	4	2	113.5
5	(Japan) AiWin	6	Ret	5	6	5	9	7	7	5	8	5	4	12	8	7	92
6	(Japan) Hitotsuyama Racing	5	6	6	Ret	10	6	10	5	8	7	9	8	7	6	8	75
7	(Japan) Ragno Motor Sport				5	4	4	5				6	5	15	Ret	6	70
8	(Japan) Fujita Yakkyoku Racing	7	8	8	8	9	Ret	8	6	7	6	10	10	9	9	11	49
9	(Japan) Abbey Racing	8	DNS	7	9	6						Ret	7	8	12	10	29
10	(Japan) Eagle Sports	DNS	Ret	9	10	8						8	11	10	11	12	12
11	(Japan) Nilzz Racing				11	11	5	11				12	12	13	Ret	13	10
12	(Japan) N-Speed				12	12			8	9	9	13	DNS	14	10	14	9
—	(China) Sky Motorsports				Ret	Ret						WD	WD				0
Pos	Driver	R1	R2	R3	R4	R5	R6	R7	R8	R9	R10	R11	R12	R13	R14	R15	Pts
Pos	Driver	OKA			FUJ1		SUZ1		SUG			FUJ2		SUZ2			Pts
