= 2026 Super GT Series =

Sports car racing season in Japan

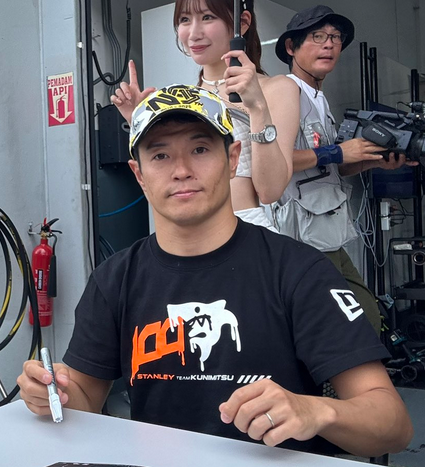
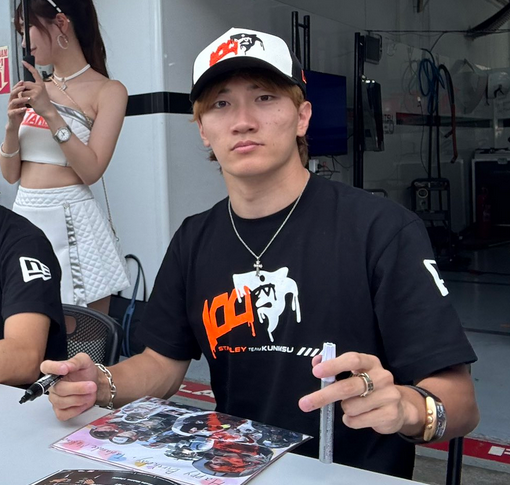
Naoki Yamamoto and Tadasuke Makino were the GT500 driver's champion, driving for Stanley Team Kunimitsu, who were the GT500 teams' champions.

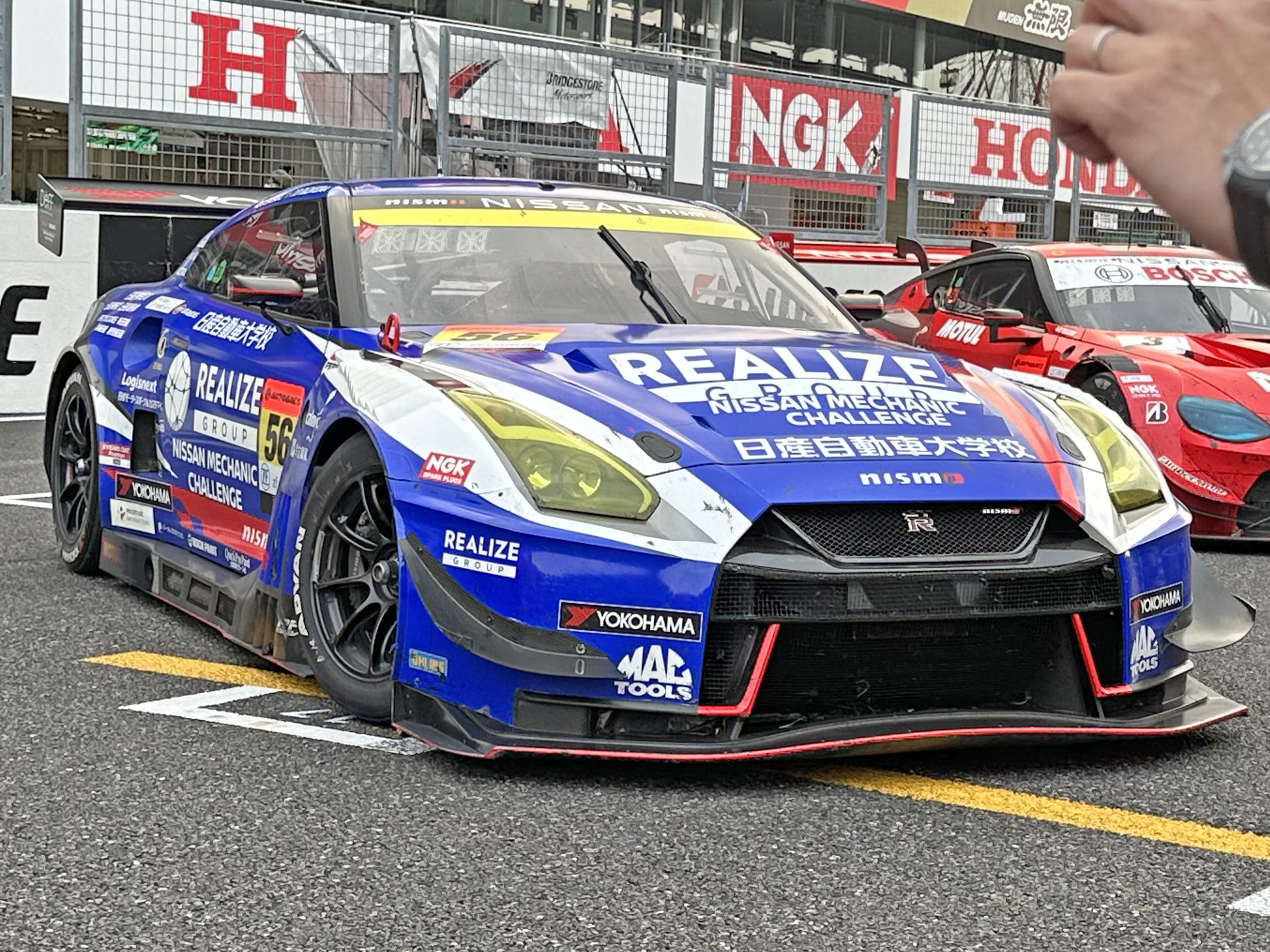
João Paulo de Oliveira & Iori Kimura were the GT300 driver's champions, driving for Kondo Racing, who were the GT300 teams' champions.

The 2026 Super GT Series (known for sponsorship reasons as the 2026 Autobacs Super GT Series) was a motor racing championship based in Japan for grand touring cars, which was the thirty-fourth season of the Super GT series, tracing its lineage to the All Japan Grand Touring Car Championship era. It was the twenty-second season for the series under the Super GT name, and the forty-fourth season of a Japan Automobile Federation (JAF) national sportscar championship, dating back to the All Japan Endurance/Sports Prototype Championship.

TGR Team TOM'S drivers Sho Tsuboi and Kenta Yamashita entered the season as the defending champions of the GT500 class. While Togo Suganami & Naoya Gamou, driving for K2 R&D LEON Racing entered the season as the defending champions of the GT300 class.

== Calendar ==
The provisional calendar for 2026 was confirmed on 5 August 2025, which consists of eight races. On 9 January 2026, the dates of the Sepang International Circuit round were shifted from 19 to 20 June to 20–21 June. Before the first round, it was announced that the round at Sepang was cancelled due to the Middle East war and fuel cost soaring, but later on 2 August 2026 was announced the Motegi round will have 2 races as the Sepang replacement.

Round	Race	Circuit	Location	Dates	Map of circuit locations
1	Okayama GT 300 km Race	(Okayama Prefecture) Okayama International Circuit	Mimasaka, Okayama Prefecture	11–12 April	2026 Super GT Series is located in Japan
2	Fuji GT 3 Hours Race GW Special	(Shizuoka Prefecture) Fuji Speedway	Oyama, Shizuoka Prefecture	3–4 May	2026 Super GT Series is located in Japan
3	Fuji GT 300 km Race	(Shizuoka Prefecture) Fuji Speedway	Oyama, Shizuoka Prefecture	1–2 August	2026 Super GT Series is located in Japan
4	Suzuka GT 300 km Race	(Mie Prefecture) Suzuka Circuit	Suzuka, Mie Prefecture	22–23 August	2026 Super GT Series is located in Japan
5	Sugo GT 300 km Race	(Miyagi Prefecture) Sportsland Sugo	Murata, Miyagi Prefecture	19–20 September	2026 Super GT Series is located in Japan
6	Autopolis GT 3 Hours Race	(Ōita Prefecture) Autopolis	Hita, Oita Prefecture	17–18 October	2026 Super GT Series is located in Japan
7	Motegi GT 250 km Race	(Tochigi Prefecture) Mobility Resort Motegi	Motegi, Tochigi Prefecture	7–8 November	2026 Super GT Series is located in Japan
8	Motegi GT 250 km Race Grand Final	(Tochigi Prefecture) Mobility Resort Motegi	Motegi, Tochigi Prefecture	7–8 November	2026 Super GT Series is located in Japan
Cancelled Rounds					2026 Super GT Series is located in Japan
—	Sepang GT 300 km Race	(Malaysia) Sepang International Circuit	Sepang, Selangor, Malaysia	20–21 June	2026 Super GT Series is located in Japan

== Regulation changes ==
On 19 October 2025, it was announced that the 2026 season would be the last with different tire manufacturers competing against one another. The series will switch to a single tire manufacturer in each class in 2027.

Teams are now only permitted to use one engine per season, and the standard fuel flow rate of GT500 engines has been reduced from 95 kilogrammes per hour to 90.2 kg/h.

GT500 Success Weight has been modified. Once a car accumulates over 50 kilogrammes of Success Weight, the engine fuel flow rate is reduced to 88 kg/h. When that car accumulates more than 67 kg of Success Weight, a "success refuelling restrictor" is installed in to lengthen the refuelling time during pit stops. An even smaller restrictor is installed once the car accumulates more than 84 kg of Success Weight. In addition, none of the original 50 kg of physical ballast weight is removed until the Success Weight is reduced over the final two rounds of the season.

2026 GT500 Success Weight Formula
Success Weight (SW)	0–50 kg	51–67 kg	68–84 kg	85–100 kg
Ballast weight	0–50 kg	50 kg		
Engine fuel flow rate	90.2 kg/h	88.0 kg/h		
Success fuelling restrictor	Standard (25mm)		Level 1 (21mm)	Level 2 (19mm)

No individual can serve as both an active racing driver and as a team director simultaneously.

== Teams and drivers ==
=== GT500 ===
Team	Make	Car	Engine	No.	Drivers	Tire	Rounds	Ref.
Team HRC ARTA Mugen	Honda	Honda HRC Prelude-GT	Honda HR-420E 2.0 L Turbo I4	8	(Japan) Kakunoshin Ohta	B	All	
Team HRC ARTA Mugen	Honda	Honda HRC Prelude-GT	Honda HR-420E 2.0 L Turbo I4	8	(Japan) Hiroki Otsu	B	All	
ARTA Mugen	Honda	Honda HRC Prelude-GT	Honda HR-420E 2.0 L Turbo I4	16	(Japan) Tomoki Nojiri	B	All	
ARTA Mugen	Honda	Honda HRC Prelude-GT	Honda HR-420E 2.0 L Turbo I4	16	(Japan) Ren Sato	B	All	
Team Impul	Nissan	Nissan Z NISMO GT500	Nissan NR4S26 2.0 L Turbo I4	12	(Japan) Kazuki Hiramine	B	All	
Team Impul	Nissan	Nissan Z NISMO GT500	Nissan NR4S26 2.0 L Turbo I4	12	(Belgium) Bertrand Baguette	B	All	
TGR Team ENEOS ROOKIE	Toyota GR	Toyota GR Supra GT500	Toyota RI4BG 2.0 L Turbo I4	14	(Japan) Nirei Fukuzumi	B	All	
TGR Team ENEOS ROOKIE	Toyota GR	Toyota GR Supra GT500	Toyota RI4BG 2.0 L Turbo I4	14	(Japan) Kazuya Oshima	B	All	
Astemo Real Racing	Honda	Honda HRC Prelude-GT	Honda HR-420E 2.0 L Turbo I4	17	(Japan) Koudai Tsukakoshi	B	All	
Astemo Real Racing	Honda	Honda HRC Prelude-GT	Honda HR-420E 2.0 L Turbo I4	17	(Japan) Yuto Nomura	B	All	
TGR Team WedsSport Bandoh	Toyota GR	Toyota GR Supra GT500	Toyota RI4BG 2.0 L Turbo I4	19	(Japan) Yuji Kunimoto	Y	All	
TGR Team WedsSport Bandoh	Toyota GR	Toyota GR Supra GT500	Toyota RI4BG 2.0 L Turbo I4	19	(Japan) Sena Sakaguchi	Y	All	
NISMO	Nissan	Nissan Z NISMO GT500	Nissan NR4S26 2.0 L Turbo I4	23	(Japan) Katsumasa Chiyo	B	All	
NISMO	Nissan	Nissan Z NISMO GT500	Nissan NR4S26 2.0 L Turbo I4	23	(Japan) Mitsunori Takaboshi	B	All	
NISMO	Nissan	Nissan Z NISMO GT500	Nissan NR4S26 2.0 L Turbo I4	23	(Japan) Daiki Sasaki	B	5	
Kondo Racing	Nissan	Nissan Z NISMO GT500	Nissan NR4S26 2.0 L Turbo I4	24	(Japan) Teppei Natori	B	All	
Kondo Racing	Nissan	Nissan Z NISMO GT500	Nissan NR4S26 2.0 L Turbo I4	24	(Japan) Atsushi Miyake	B	All	
TGR Team au TOM'S	Toyota GR	Toyota GR Supra GT500	Toyota RI4BG 2.0 L Turbo I4	36	(Japan) Sho Tsuboi	B	All	
TGR Team au TOM'S	Toyota GR	Toyota GR Supra GT500	Toyota RI4BG 2.0 L Turbo I4	36	(Japan) Kenta Yamashita	B	All	
TGR Team Deloitte TOM'S	Toyota GR	Toyota GR Supra GT500	Toyota RI4BG 2.0 L Turbo I4	37	(Japan) Ukyo Sasahara	B	All	
TGR Team Deloitte TOM'S	Toyota GR	Toyota GR Supra GT500	Toyota RI4BG 2.0 L Turbo I4	37	(France) Giuliano Alesi	B	All	
TGR Team KeePer Cerumo	Toyota GR	Toyota GR Supra GT500	Toyota RI4BG 2.0 L Turbo I4	38	(Japan) Toshiki Oyu	B	All	
TGR Team KeePer Cerumo	Toyota GR	Toyota GR Supra GT500	Toyota RI4BG 2.0 L Turbo I4	38	(Japan) Rikuto Kobayashi	B	All	
TGR Team SARD	Toyota GR	Toyota GR Supra GT500	Toyota RI4BG 2.0 L Turbo I4	39	(Japan) Yuhi Sekiguchi	B	All	
TGR Team SARD	Toyota GR	Toyota GR Supra GT500	Toyota RI4BG 2.0 L Turbo I4	39	(Argentina) Sacha Fenestraz	B	All	
Modulo Nakajima Racing	Honda	Honda HRC Prelude-GT	Honda HR-420E 2.0 L Turbo I4	64	(Japan) Riki Okusa	D	All	
Modulo Nakajima Racing	Honda	Honda HRC Prelude-GT	Honda HR-420E 2.0 L Turbo I4	64	(Brazil) Igor Omura Fraga	D	All	
Stanley Team Kunimitsu	Honda	Honda HRC Prelude-GT	Honda HR-420E 2.0 L Turbo I4	100	(Japan) Naoki Yamamoto	B	All	
Stanley Team Kunimitsu	Honda	Honda HRC Prelude-GT	Honda HR-420E 2.0 L Turbo I4	100	(Japan) Tadasuke Makino	B	All	

==== GT500 vehicle changes ====
- Honda Racing Corporation (HRC) introduced the new HRC Prelude-GT as its GT500 vehicle, replacing the Civic Type R-GT after two seasons.

==== GT500 entrant changes ====
Nissan announced its line-ups on 9 December 2025.

- Two-time GT500 Champion Tsugio Matsuda retired from Super GT after 20 seasons as a Nissan GT500 driver, and 26 seasons in GT500 in total. Matsuda become the new team director for NISMO, replacing Takeshi Nakajima. Atsushi Miyake transferred from NISMO NDDP to Kondo Racing, replacing Matsuda in the No. 24 car. Kondo Racing will also switch to Bridgestone tires, after competing in GT500 with Yokohama for 20 years.
- NISMO scaled down to one car from two, discontinuing the No. 3 car that had been running under the NISMO NDDP banner. Daiki Sasaki was retained by Nissan as its GT500 reserve driver.

Toyota announced its driver line-ups on 19 December 2025.

- TGR Team au TOM'S will revert to using the number 36 instead of the number 1 reserved for the reigning GT500 champion team.
- TGR-DC driver Rikuto Kobayashi was promoted to GT500 with TGR Team KeePer Cerumo after two seasons in GT300. He will replace Hiroaki Ishiura, who retired from racing in GT500 after 18 seasons and will move to GT300 with Team ENEOS Rookie.

Honda announced its driver line-ups on 23 December 2025.

- The No. 8 ARTA Honda will be operated as a works team with direct support from HRC. The No. 8 car will be driven by Kakunoshin Ohta, who returns to the series after a year away, and Hiroki Otsu, who moves over from the No. 16 car. They replace Tomoki Nojiri, who will now drive the No. 16 car alongside Ren Sato, and Nobuharu Matsushita, who will drive exclusively in the Super Formula Championship for Honda customer team Delightworks Racing.
- 2025 Super Formula Lights champion and GT300 class race winner Yuto Nomura was promoted to GT500 with Real Racing, replacing Syun Koide, who will serve as Honda's GT500 reserve driver.
- Nakajima Racing Super Formula driver Igor Omura Fraga was promoted to drive the team's GT500 car after three years in GT300 with Anest Iwata Racing. Fraga replaces Takuya Izawa, who retired from the series after 17 years to become the new Team Director.

==== GT500 mid-season changes ====
- Katsumasa Chiyo has withdrawn from the Sugo round after suffered a broken toe. Nismo reserve driver, Daiki Sasaki replaces Chiyo, and partner with Mitsunori Takaboshi.

=== GT300 ===
Team	Make	Car	Engine	No.	Drivers	Tire	Rounds	Ref.
Hyper Water Racing Inging	Toyota GR	Toyota GR86 GT300	Toyota 2UR-GSE 5.4 L V8	2	(Japan) Yuui Tsutsumi	B	All	
Hyper Water Racing Inging	Toyota GR	Toyota GR86 GT300	Toyota 2UR-GSE 5.4 L V8	2	(Japan) Kazuhisa Urabe	B	All	
Goodsmile Racing & TeamUKYO	Mercedes-AMG	Mercedes-AMG GT3 Evo	Mercedes-AMG M159 6.2 L V8	4	(Japan) Nobuteru Taniguchi	Y	All	
Goodsmile Racing & TeamUKYO	Mercedes-AMG	Mercedes-AMG GT3 Evo	Mercedes-AMG M159 6.2 L V8	4	(Japan) Tatsuya Kataoka	Y	All	
Team Mach	Toyota	Toyota 86 MC GT300	GTA V8 4.5 L V8	5	(Japan) Yusuke Shiotsu	Y	All	
Team Mach	Toyota	Toyota 86 MC GT300	GTA V8 4.5 L V8	5	(Japan) Souta Arao	Y	All	
Team Mach	Toyota	Toyota 86 MC GT300	GTA V8 4.5 L V8	5	(Japan) Kimiya Sato	Y	5	
Velorex	Ferrari	Ferrari 296 GT3 (1–2); Ferrari 296 GT3 Evo (3–8)	Ferrari F163CE 3.0 L Turbo V6	6	(Japan) Yoshiaki Katayama	Y	All	
Velorex	Ferrari	Ferrari 296 GT3 (1–2); Ferrari 296 GT3 Evo (3–8)	Ferrari F163CE 3.0 L Turbo V6	6	(Germany) Niklas Krütten	Y	All	
CarGuy MKS Racing	Ferrari	Ferrari 296 GT3 Evo	Ferrari F163CE 3.0 L Turbo V6	7	(United Kingdom) Zak O'Sullivan	Y	1–6	
CarGuy MKS Racing	Ferrari	Ferrari 296 GT3 Evo	Ferrari F163CE 3.0 L Turbo V6	7	(Japan) Reimei Ito	Y	1–2, 6	
CarGuy MKS Racing	Ferrari	Ferrari 296 GT3 Evo	Ferrari F163CE 3.0 L Turbo V6	7	(Japan) Kiyoshi Umegaki	Y	2–8	
CarGuy MKS Racing	Ferrari	Ferrari 296 GT3 Evo	Ferrari F163CE 3.0 L Turbo V6	7	(Japan) Ritomo Miyata	Y	7–8	
Pacific Racing Team	BMW	BMW M4 GT3 Evo	BMW P58 3.0 L Turbo I6	9	(Japan) Yusuke Tomibayashi	M	All	
Pacific Racing Team	BMW	BMW M4 GT3 Evo	BMW P58 3.0 L Turbo I6	9	(Japan) Yuta Fujiwara	M	1–6, 8	
Pacific Racing Team	BMW	BMW M4 GT3 Evo	BMW P58 3.0 L Turbo I6	9	(Japan) Rintaro Kubo	M	2, 6–7	
GAINER	Nissan	Nissan Fairlady Z GT300 (RZ34)	Nissan VR38DETT 3.8 L Turbo V6	11	(Japan) Ryuichiro Tomita	D	All	
GAINER	Nissan	Nissan Fairlady Z GT300 (RZ34)	Nissan VR38DETT 3.8 L Turbo V6	11	(Japan) Kazuki Oki	D	All	
Anest Iwata Racing	Nissan	Nissan Fairlady Z GT300 (RZ34)	Nissan VR38DETT 3.8 L Turbo V6	26	(Japan) Hironobu Yasuda	Y	All	
Anest Iwata Racing	Nissan	Nissan Fairlady Z GT300 (RZ34)	Nissan VR38DETT 3.8 L Turbo V6	26	(South Korea) Lee Jungwoo	Y	1–6	
Anest Iwata Racing	Nissan	Nissan Fairlady Z GT300 (RZ34)	Nissan VR38DETT 3.8 L Turbo V6	26	(Japan) Yusuke Mitsui	Y	6–8	
Team UpGarage	Mercedes-AMG	Mercedes-AMG GT3 Evo	Mercedes-AMG M159 6.2 L V8	18	(Japan) Takashi Kobayashi	Y	All	
Team UpGarage	Mercedes-AMG	Mercedes-AMG GT3 Evo	Mercedes-AMG M159 6.2 L V8	18	(Japan) Kotaro Shimbara	Y	All	
SHADE Racing	Lexus	Lexus RC F GT3	Lexus 2UR-GSE 5.4 L V8	20	(Japan) Katsuyuki Hiranaka	M	All	
SHADE Racing	Lexus	Lexus RC F GT3	Lexus 2UR-GSE 5.4 L V8	20	(Japan) Eijiro Shimizu	M	All	
R'Qs Motor Sports	Mercedes-AMG	Mercedes-AMG GT3 Evo	Mercedes-AMG M159 6.2 L V8	22	(Japan) Masaki Kano	Y	All	
R'Qs Motor Sports	Mercedes-AMG	Mercedes-AMG GT3 Evo	Mercedes-AMG M159 6.2 L V8	22	(Japan) Hisashi Wada	Y	1, 3–6	
R'Qs Motor Sports	Mercedes-AMG	Mercedes-AMG GT3 Evo	Mercedes-AMG M159 6.2 L V8	22	(Japan) Yuma Shoji	Y	2, 6, 8	
R'Qs Motor Sports	Mercedes-AMG	Mercedes-AMG GT3 Evo	Mercedes-AMG M159 6.2 L V8	22	(Japan) Masaki Jyonai	Y	2, 7	
Hoppy Team Tsuchiya	Toyota GR	Toyota GR Supra GT300	Toyota 2UR-GSE 5.4 L V8	25	(Japan) Takamitsu Matsui	Y	All	
Hoppy Team Tsuchiya	Toyota GR	Toyota GR Supra GT300	Toyota 2UR-GSE 5.4 L V8	25	(Japan) Ryota Horachi	Y	All	
apr	Toyota GR	Toyota GR86 GT300	Toyota 2UR-GSE 5.4 L V8	30	(Japan) Hibiki Taira	Y	All	
apr	Toyota GR	Toyota GR86 GT300	Toyota 2UR-GSE 5.4 L V8	30	(Japan) Hiroaki Nagai	Y	1, 3–6	
apr	Toyota GR	Toyota GR86 GT300	Toyota 2UR-GSE 5.4 L V8	30	(Japan) Manabu Orido	Y	2, 6–8	
apr	Lexus	Lexus LC 500h GT300	Lexus 2UR-GSE 5.4 L Hybrid V8	31	(Japan) Kazuto Kotaka	B	All	
apr	Lexus	Lexus LC 500h GT300	Lexus 2UR-GSE 5.4 L Hybrid V8	31	(Japan) Miki Koyama	B	All	
apr	Lexus	Lexus LC 500h GT300	Lexus 2UR-GSE 5.4 L Hybrid V8	31	(Austria) Charlie Wurz	B	2, 6	
Team ENEOS Rookie	Mercedes-AMG	Mercedes-AMG GT3 Evo	Mercedes-AMG M159 6.2 L V8	32	(Japan) Hiroaki Ishiura	B	1–6	
Team ENEOS Rookie	Mercedes-AMG	Mercedes-AMG GT3 Evo	Mercedes-AMG M159 6.2 L V8	32	(Japan) Tokiya Suzuki	B	1, 3–6	
Team ENEOS Rookie	Mercedes-AMG	Mercedes-AMG GT3 Evo	Mercedes-AMG M159 6.2 L V8	32	(Japan) Kamui Kobayashi	B	2	
Team ENEOS Rookie	Toyota GR	Toyota GR GT3	Toyota G40E 4.0 L Turbo V8	32	(Japan) Hiroaki Ishiura	B	7–8	
Team ENEOS Rookie	Toyota GR	Toyota GR GT3	Toyota G40E 4.0 L Turbo V8	32	(Japan) Tokiya Suzuki	B	7–8	
Ponos Racing	Ferrari	Ferrari 296 GT3 Evo	Ferrari F163CE 3.0 L Turbo V6	45	(Japan) Takuro Shinohara	Y	All	
Ponos Racing	Ferrari	Ferrari 296 GT3 Evo	Ferrari F163CE 3.0 L Turbo V6	45	(Japan) Kei Cozzolino	Y	1–2	
Ponos Racing	Ferrari	Ferrari 296 GT3 Evo	Ferrari F163CE 3.0 L Turbo V6	45	(Japan) Shintaro Kawabata	Y	3–8	
Ponos Racing	Ferrari	Ferrari 296 GT3 Evo	Ferrari F163CE 3.0 L Turbo V6	45	(Japan) Kento Omiya	Y	6	
Nilzz Racing	Nissan	Nissan GT-R Nismo GT3	Nissan VR38DETT 3.8 L Turbo V6	48	(United Kingdom) James Pull	Y	All	
Nilzz Racing	Nissan	Nissan GT-R Nismo GT3	Nissan VR38DETT 3.8 L Turbo V6	48	(Japan) Taiyo Ida	Y	1–4, 6–7	
Nilzz Racing	Nissan	Nissan GT-R Nismo GT3	Nissan VR38DETT 3.8 L Turbo V6	48	(Japan) Daiki Fujiwara	Y	2, 5–6, 8	
Saitama Green Brave	Toyota GR	Toyota GR Supra GT300	Toyota 2UR-GSE 5.4 L V8	52	(Japan) Hiroki Yoshida	B	All	
Saitama Green Brave	Toyota GR	Toyota GR Supra GT300	Toyota 2UR-GSE 5.4 L V8	52	(Japan) Seita Nonaka	B	All	
Kondo Racing	Nissan	Nissan GT-R Nismo GT3	Nissan VR38DETT 3.8 L Turbo V6	56	(Brazil) João Paulo de Oliveira	Y	All	
Kondo Racing	Nissan	Nissan GT-R Nismo GT3	Nissan VR38DETT 3.8 L Turbo V6	56	(Japan) Iori Kimura	Y	All	
LM corsa	Lexus	Lexus LC 500 GT300	Lexus 2UR-GSE 5.4 L V8	60	(Japan) Hiroki Yoshimoto	D	All	
LM corsa	Lexus	Lexus LC 500 GT300	Lexus 2UR-GSE 5.4 L V8	60	(Japan) Shunsuke Kohno	D	All	
R&D Sport	Subaru	Subaru BRZ GT300 (ZD8)	Subaru EG33 3.0 L Turbo Flat-6	61	(Japan) Takuto Iguchi	D	All	
R&D Sport	Subaru	Subaru BRZ GT300 (ZD8)	Subaru EG33 3.0 L Turbo Flat-6	61	(Japan) Hideki Yamauchi	D	All	
HELM Motorsports	Nissan	Nissan GT-R Nismo GT3	Nissan VR38DETT 3.8 L Turbo V6	62	(Japan) Yuya Hiraki	Y	All	
HELM Motorsports	Nissan	Nissan GT-R Nismo GT3	Nissan VR38DETT 3.8 L Turbo V6	62	(Japan) Reiji Hiraki	Y	All	
K2 R&D LEON Racing	Mercedes-AMG	Mercedes-AMG GT3 Evo	Mercedes-AMG M159 6.2 L V8	65	(Japan) Naoya Gamou	B	All	
K2 R&D LEON Racing	Mercedes-AMG	Mercedes-AMG GT3 Evo	Mercedes-AMG M159 6.2 L V8	65	(Japan) Togo Suganami	B	All	
K2 R&D LEON Racing	Mercedes-AMG	Mercedes-AMG GT3 Evo	Mercedes-AMG M159 6.2 L V8	65	(Japan) Haruki Kurosawa	B	2, 6	
JLOC	Lamborghini	Lamborghini Huracán GT3 Evo 2	Lamborghini DGF 5.2 L V10	87	(Japan) Yuya Motojima	Y	All	
JLOC	Lamborghini	Lamborghini Huracán GT3 Evo 2	Lamborghini DGF 5.2 L V10	87	(Japan) Kosuke Matsuura	Y	All	
JLOC	Lamborghini	Lamborghini Huracán GT3 Evo 2	Lamborghini DGF 5.2 L V10	87	(Japan) Kohta Kawaai	Y	2, 6	
JLOC	Lamborghini	Lamborghini Huracán GT3 Evo 2	Lamborghini DGF 5.2 L V10	88	(Japan) Takashi Kogure	Y	All	
JLOC	Lamborghini	Lamborghini Huracán GT3 Evo 2	Lamborghini DGF 5.2 L V10	88	(Italy) Daniil Kvyat (Note: Kvyat is a Russian driver competing under Italian license, as Russian national emblems were banned by the FIA following the Russian invasion of Ukraine. Although the ban was lifted on 13 August 2026, Kvyat retained his Italian licence.)	Y	All	
JLOC	Lamborghini	Lamborghini Huracán GT3 Evo 2	Lamborghini DGF 5.2 L V10	88	(Japan) Natsu Sakaguchi	Y	2, 6	
K-tunes Racing	Lexus	Lexus RC F GT3	Lexus 2UR-GSE 5.4 L V8	96	(Japan) Morio Nitta	B	All	
K-tunes Racing	Lexus	Lexus RC F GT3	Lexus 2UR-GSE 5.4 L V8	96	(Japan) Shinichi Takagi	B	All	
Tomei Sports	Nissan	Nissan GT-R Nismo GT3	Nissan VR38DETT 3.8 L Turbo V6	360	(Japan) Rin Arakawa	Y	All	
Tomei Sports	Nissan	Nissan GT-R Nismo GT3	Nissan VR38DETT 3.8 L Turbo V6	360	(Japan) Yu Kanamaru	Y	1–2, 4–8	
Tomei Sports	Nissan	Nissan GT-R Nismo GT3	Nissan VR38DETT 3.8 L Turbo V6	360	(Japan) Atsushi Tanaka	Y	2, 6	
Tomei Sports	Nissan	Nissan GT-R Nismo GT3	Nissan VR38DETT 3.8 L Turbo V6	360	(Japan) Hironobu Shimizu	Y	3	
Seven x Seven Racing	Porsche	Porsche 911 GT3 R (992.2)	Porsche M97/80 4.2 L Flat-6	666	(Germany) Sven Müller	Y	All	
Seven x Seven Racing	Porsche	Porsche 911 GT3 R (992.2)	Porsche M97/80 4.2 L Flat-6	666	(Japan) Kiyoto Fujinami	Y	1–4	
Seven x Seven Racing	Porsche	Porsche 911 GT3 R (992.2)	Porsche M97/80 4.2 L Flat-6	666	(Japan) Taichi Watarai	Y	4–8	
D'station Racing	Aston Martin	Aston Martin Vantage AMR GT3 Evo	Aston Martin AMR16A 4.0 L Turbo V8	777	(United Kingdom) Charlie Fagg	D	All	
D'station Racing	Aston Martin	Aston Martin Vantage AMR GT3 Evo	Aston Martin AMR16A 4.0 L Turbo V8	777	(Japan) Tomonobu Fujii	D	1–6	
D'station Racing	Aston Martin	Aston Martin Vantage AMR GT3 Evo	Aston Martin AMR16A 4.0 L Turbo V8	777	(Japan) Tsubasa Kondo	D	7–8	

==== GT300 vehicle changes ====
- Ferrari customer team Ponos Racing and CarGuy MKS Racing will receive the new Ferrari 296 GT3 Evo package. Velorex are expected to receive theirs during the season.
- Porsche Motorsport Asia Pacific customer team Seven x Seven Racing will receive the updated Porsche 911 GT3 R (992.2).
- SHADE Racing replaced its Toyota GR86 GT300 with the Lexus RC F GT3.
- R&D Sport replaced the No. 61 Subaru BRZ GT300's four-cylinder EJ20 engine with the six-cylinder EG33 engine used in the Subaru Alcyone SVX.
- Anest Iwata Racing replaced its Lexus RC F with the Nissan Fairlady Z GT300.
- Pacific Racing Team replaced its Mercedes-AMG GT3 Evo with the BMW M4 GT3 Evo, marking the first outing in Super GT for the latest version of the M4 and bringing BMW M back to the championship for the first time since 2024.
- Rookie Racing started the season with the AMG GT3, however, the team will switch to the GR GT3 Concept for Round 8 at Motegi.

==== GT300 entrant changes ====
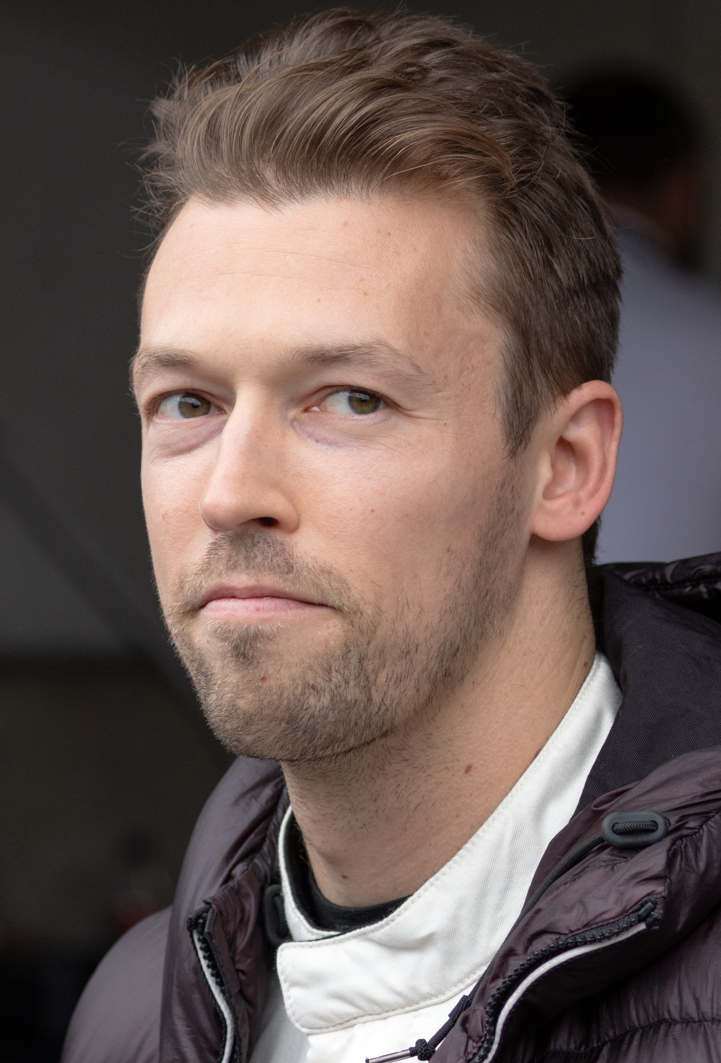
Former Formula One driver Daniil Kvyat will make debut with JLOC.

- Kazuhisa Urabe was promoted to a full-time seat at Inging Motorsport, replacing apr bound Hibiki Taira.
- Former Inging driver Hibiki Taira will drive the No. 30 apr Toyota GR86 GT300, which will revert to Yokohama tires after a season with Michelin. Kazuto Kotaka returns to the GT300 class to the No. 31 apr Lexus LC500h after serving as Toyota's GT500 reserve driver, replacing Oliver Rasmussen. Manabu Orido remained with the No. 30 GR86 as its third driver, and FIA Formula 3 Championship alumni Charlie Wurz will make his GT300 debut as the third driver of the No. 31 LC500h for apr, replacing Yuki Nemoto.
- FIA F4 Japanese Championship graduate Ryota Horachi will make his series debut with Hoppy Team Tsuchiya, with Kimiya Sato move to Super Taikyu ST-Z class with Aoyama Gakuin Automobile Club.
- K-tunes Racing changed tyre suppliers from Dunlop to Bridgestone.
- Reigning Porsche Carrera Cup Japan champion Iori Kimura joined Kondo Racing from Team Mach. Kimura replaces last season's championship runner-up Kohei Hirate, who left Nissan and will take a year sabbatical from racing.
- Team UpGarage will receive technical support from Real Racing, replacing Servus Japan. HFDP driver and F4 Japan graduate Kotaro Shimbara will make his series debut, replacing newly promoted GT500 driver Yuto Nomura.
- Rookie Racing expanded its presence into GT300 class by entering the No. 32 Mercedes-AMG GT3 Evo. 2007 GT300 champion Hiroaki Ishiura returns to the category after 18 seasons in GT500, and reigning FIA F4 Japanese Champion Tokiya Suzuki will make his series debut. The team will use Bridgestone tires.
- Along with the change to the BMW M4 GT3 EVO, Pacific Racing Team changed tire suppliers from Yokohama to Michelin. Yuta Fujiwara has been promoted to a full-time driver, replacing new Sporting Director, Ryohei Sakaguchi. Rintaro Kubo returns to the series for the first time since 2020 as Pacific's third driver.
- Former Formula One driver and current Lamborghini Squadra Corse factory driver Daniil Kvyat will make his series debut with JLOC. Kvyat will drive the No. 88 car alongside Takashi Kogure. Yuya Motojima, who won the 2024 GT300 championship alongside Kogure, moves to the No. 87 car to drive alongside Kosuke Matsuura. Natsu Sakaguchi has been retained as a reserve driver for JLOC, joined by returning 2023 GT300 champion Kohta Kawaai.
- Two-time Super Taikyu TCR champion Lee Jungwoo will make his series debut with Anest Iwata Racing, replacing newly promoted GT500 driver Igor Fraga.
- 2025 Formula Regional Japanese Champion Kiyoshi Umegaki will make his GT300 debut with CarGuy MKS Racing, replacing newly promoted GT500 driver Rikuto Kobayashi. 2024 Porsche Carrera Cup Japan champion and former LM corsa driver Reimei Ito joins the team as the third driver.
- Porsche contracted driver and GT World Challenge Europe Endurance Cup champion Sven Müller will return to the series for the first time in eight years, joining Seven x Seven Racing. Müller replaces Harry King, who left the series to compete full-time in the IMSA SportsCar Championship with AO Racing. Seven x Seven Racing also saw Tsubasa Kondo left to compete in GT World Challenge Asia with Porsche Centre Okazaki. they signed reigning Porsche Carrera Cup Middle East champion Taichi Watarai to be their third driver.
- Former BMW M Team Studie driver Niklas Krütten returns to the series after a year away, replacing Roberto Merhi at Velorex.
- Ponos Racing changed tire suppliers from Dunlop to Yokohama.
- Former GT World Challenge Europe and Super Taikyu Series driver James Pull will make his series debut with Nilzz Racing, replacing Yusaku Shibata.
- Former Red Bull and HFDP driver Souta Arao will make his series debut with Team Mach, replacing Kondo-bound driver Iori Kimura.
- Tomei Sports signed Yu Kanamaru, who competed in GT World Challenge Asia with Team 5ZIGEN, with Takayuki Aoki going the other way and Hironobu Shimizu compete in Super Taikyu ST-Z with Aoyama Gakuin Automobile Club.

==== GT300 mid-season changes ====
- Tokiya Suzuki missed the second round after his car license was suspended. He was replaced by two-time FIA WEC champion Kamui Kobayashi at Rookie Racing. Hiroaki Nagai also missed the second round, as he prioritise his GT World Challenge Asia campaign. Nagai was substituted by the team's third driver Manabu Orido.
- Kei Cozzolino left Ponos Racing after the Fuji Golden Week Race. Reigning SRO Japan Cup champion Shintaro Kawabata returns to the series after three years and named as Cozzolino's replacement. Hironobu Shimizu makes a return to Tomei Sports for the Fuji 300 km round, as he replaced Yu Kanamaru briefly. Velorex is the last team to replace the previous Ferrari 296 GT3 with the new EVO model.
- Taichi Watarai made his series debut with Seven x Seven Racing at the Suzuka round, replaces Kiyoto Fujinami for the rest of the season.
- Souta Arao missed the Sugo round to participate in Indy NXT Driver Evaluation Test at Indianapolis Motor Speedway with Chip Ganassi Racing. Kimiya Sato returns to the series as a substitute for Arao.
- 2026 Super Formula Lights runner-up, Yusuke Mitsui returns to the series after almost two years away, as he joined Anest Iwata Racing as their third driver. Ponos Racing promoted their Formula Regional Japan driver, Kento Omiya as their third driver as well.
- Manabu Orido will compete for the final two rounds at Motegi, as he will retire from the series afterwards. 2023 GT500 champion, Ritomo Miyata will make his return to the GT300 for the first time since 2019, as he will join CarGuy MKS Racing to replace Formula E bound, Zak O'Sullivan Yusuke Mitsui will continue to race with Anest Iwata Racing for the last two rounds, as he will replace Lee Jungwoo. Tomonobu Fujii has been banned to compete for the last round after received enough penalty points to miss the round, his replacement will be Tsubasa Kondo.
- Rookie Racing to be the first team to race the Toyota GR GT3, as they replace the Mercedes-AMG GT3 Evo.

== Results ==
Drivers credited with winning Pole Position and the race's fastest lap for their respective teams are indicated in bold text.

Round	Circuit	Class	Pole position	Fastest lap	Race winner
1	(Okayama Prefecture) Okayama 300 km	GT500	No. 38 TGR Team KeePer Cerumo	No. 38 TGR Team KeePer Cerumo	No. 36 TGR Team au TOM'S
1	(Okayama Prefecture) Okayama 300 km	GT500	**(Japan) Toshiki Oyu** (Japan) Rikuto Kobayashi	**(Japan) Toshiki Oyu** (Japan) Rikuto Kobayashi	(Japan) Sho Tsuboi (Japan) Kenta Yamashita
1	(Okayama Prefecture) Okayama 300 km	GT300	No. 777 D'station Racing	No. 777 D'station Racing	No. 777 D'station Racing
1	(Okayama Prefecture) Okayama 300 km	GT300	**(Japan) Tomonobu Fujii** (United Kingdom) Charlie Fagg	**(Japan) Tomonobu Fujii** (United Kingdom) Charlie Fagg	(Japan) Tomonobu Fujii (United Kingdom) Charlie Fagg
2	(Shizuoka Prefecture) Fuji 3 Hours	GT500	No. 14 TGR Team ENEOS ROOKIE	No. 14 TGR Team ENEOS ROOKIE	No. 36 TGR Team au TOM'S
2	(Shizuoka Prefecture) Fuji 3 Hours	GT500	**(Japan) Nirei Fukuzumi** (Japan) Kazuya Oshima	**(Japan) Nirei Fukuzumi** (Japan) Kazuya Oshima	(Japan) Sho Tsuboi (Japan) Kenta Yamashita
2	(Shizuoka Prefecture) Fuji 3 Hours	GT300	No. 61 R&D Sport	No. 61 R&D Sport	No. 56 Kondo Racing
2	(Shizuoka Prefecture) Fuji 3 Hours	GT300	(Japan) Takuto Iguchi **(Japan) Hideki Yamauchi**	(Japan) Takuto Iguchi **(Japan) Hideki Yamauchi**	(Brazil) João Paulo de Oliveira (Japan) Iori Kimura
3	(Shizuoka Prefecture) Fuji 300 km	GT500	No. 8 Team HRC ARTA	No. 100 Stanley Team Kunimitsu	No. 100 Stanley Team Kunimitsu
3	(Shizuoka Prefecture) Fuji 300 km	GT500	**(Japan) Kakunoshin Ohta** (Japan) Hiroki Otsu	**(Japan) Naoki Yamamoto** (Japan) Tadasuke Makino	(Japan) Naoki Yamamoto (Japan) Tadasuke Makino
3	(Shizuoka Prefecture) Fuji 300 km	GT300	No. 45 Ponos Racing	No. 45 Ponos Racing	No. 52 Saitama Green Brave
3	(Shizuoka Prefecture) Fuji 300 km	GT300	(Japan) Takuro Shinohara **(Japan) Shintaro Kawabata**	**(Japan) Takuro Shinohara** (Japan) Shintaro Kawabata	(Japan) Hiroki Yoshida (Japan) Seita Nonaka
4	(Mie Prefecture) Suzuka 300 km	GT500	No. 17 Astemo Real Racing	No. 19 TGR Team WedsSport Bandoh	No. 16 ARTA Mugen
4	(Mie Prefecture) Suzuka 300 km	GT500	(Japan) Koudai Tsukakoshi **(Japan) Yuto Nomura**	(Japan) Yuji Kunimoto **(Japan) Sena Sakaguchi**	(Japan) Tomoki Nojiri (Japan) Ren Sato
4	(Mie Prefecture) Suzuka 300 km	GT300	No. 9 Pacific Racing Team	No. 9 Pacific Racing Team	No. 9 Pacific Racing Team
4	(Mie Prefecture) Suzuka 300 km	GT300	**(Japan) Yusuke Tomibayashi** (Japan) Yuta Fujiwara	**(Japan) Yusuke Tomibayashi** (Japan) Yuta Fujiwara	(Japan) Yusuke Tomibayashi (Japan) Yuta Fujiwara
5	(Miyagi Prefecture) Sugo 300 km	GT500	No. 64 Modulo Nakajima Racing	No. 64 Modulo Nakajima Racing	No. 17 Astemo Real Racing
5	(Miyagi Prefecture) Sugo 300 km	GT500	**(Japan) Riki Okusa** (Brazil) Igor Omura Fraga	(Japan) Riki Okusa **(Brazil) Igor Omura Fraga**	(Japan) Koudai Tsukakoshi (Japan) Yuto Nomura
5	(Miyagi Prefecture) Sugo 300 km	GT300	No. 60 LM corsa	No. 60 LM corsa	No. 60 LM corsa
5	(Miyagi Prefecture) Sugo 300 km	GT300	**(Japan) Hiroki Yoshimoto** (Japan) Shunsuke Kohno	(Japan) Hiroki Yoshimoto **(Japan) Shunsuke Kohno**	(Japan) Hiroki Yoshimoto (Japan) Shunsuke Kohno
6	(Ōita Prefecture) Autopolis 3 Hours	GT500	No. 64 Modulo Nakajima Racing	No. 64 Modulo Nakajima Racing	No. 100 Stanley Team Kunimitsu
6	(Ōita Prefecture) Autopolis 3 Hours	GT500	**(Japan) Riki Okusa** (Brazil) Igor Omura Fraga	(Japan) Riki Okusa **(Brazil) Igor Omura Fraga**	(Japan) Naoki Yamamoto (Japan) Tadasuke Makino
6	(Ōita Prefecture) Autopolis 3 Hours	GT300	No. 61 R&D Sport	No. 52 Saitama Green Brave	No. 96 K-tunes Racing
6	(Ōita Prefecture) Autopolis 3 Hours	GT300	(Japan) Takuto Iguchi **(Japan) Hideki Yamauchi**	(Japan) Hiroki Yoshida **(Japan) Seita Nonaka**	(Japan) Morio Nitta (Japan) Shinichi Takagi
7	(Tochigi Prefecture) Motegi 250 km	GT500	No. 64 Modulo Nakajima Racing	No. 24 Kondo Racing	No. 12 Team Impul
7	(Tochigi Prefecture) Motegi 250 km	GT500	**(Japan) Riki Okusa** (Brazil) Igor Omura Fraga	(Japan) Teppei Natori **(Japan) Atsushi Miyake**	(Japan) Kazuki Hiramine (Belgium) Bertrand Baguette
7	(Tochigi Prefecture) Motegi 250 km	GT300	No. 11 GAINER	No. 11 GAINER	No. 96 K-tunes Racing
7	(Tochigi Prefecture) Motegi 250 km	GT300	**(Japan) Ryuichiro Tomita** (Japan) Kazuki Oki	(Japan) Ryuichiro Tomita **(Japan) Kazuki Oki**	(Japan) Morio Nitta (Japan) Shinichi Takagi
8	(Tochigi Prefecture) Motegi 250 km Final	GT500	No. 100 Stanley Team Kunimitsu	No. 16 ARTA Mugen	No. 100 Stanley Team Kunimitsu
8	(Tochigi Prefecture) Motegi 250 km Final	GT500	(Japan) Naoki Yamamoto **(Japan) Tadasuke Makino**	**(Japan) Tomoki Nojiri** (Japan) Ren Sato	(Japan) Naoki Yamamoto (Japan) Tadasuke Makino
8	(Tochigi Prefecture) Motegi 250 km Final	GT300	No. 88 JLOC	No. 11 GAINER	No. 88 JLOC
8	(Tochigi Prefecture) Motegi 250 km Final	GT300	**(Japan) Takashi Kogure** (Italy) Daniil Kvyat	**(Japan) Ryuichiro Tomita** (Japan) Kazuki Oki	(Japan) Takashi Kogure (Italy) Daniil Kvyat

== Championship standings ==
=== GT500 ===
==== Drivers' championships ====
Scoring system

Position	1st	2nd	3rd	4th	5th	6th	7th	8th	9th	10th	Pole
GT500 Points	20	15	11	8	6	5	4	3	2	1	1

Rank	Driver	Team	OKA	FUJ1	FUJ2	SUZ	SUG	AUT	MOT1	MOT2	Points
1	(Japan) Naoki Yamamoto (Japan) Tadasuke Makino	No. 100 Stanley Team Kunimitsu	7	8	1	11	3	1	5	**1**	85
2	(Japan) Koudai Tsukakoshi (Japan) Yuto Nomura	No. 17 Astemo Real Racing	10	9	5	**2**	1	14	6	2	65
3	(Japan) Sho Tsuboi (Japan) Kenta Yamashita	No. 36 TGR Team au TOM'S	1	1	4	9	4	8	10	13	62
4	(Japan) Kazuki Hiramine (Belgium) Bertrand Baguette	No. 12 Team Impul	3	7	12	6	Ret	5	1	3	57
5	(Japan) Toshiki Oyu (Japan) Rikuto Kobayashi	No. 38 TGR Team KeePer Cerumo	**2**	13†	6	5	10	2	11	4	51
6	(Japan) Kakunoshin Ohta (Japan) Hiroki Otsu	No. 8 Team HRC ARTA Mugen	11	11	**2**	3	9	6	3	7	49
7	(Japan) Tomoki Nojiri (Japan) Ren Sato	No. 16 ARTA Mugen	6	5	9	1	Ret	9	6	6	45
8	(Japan) Yuhi Sekiguchi (Argentina) Sacha Fenestraz	No. 39 TGR Team SARD	5	4	8	Ret	2	7	4	DSQ	44
9	(Japan) Mitsunori Takaboshi	No. 23 NISMO	8	3	Ret	4	8	3	7	11	40
10	(Japan) Nirei Fukuzumi (Japan) Kazuya Oshima	No. 14 TGR Team ENEOS ROOKIE	4	**2**	7	8	11	13	DSQ	5	37
11	(Japan) Katsumasa Chiyo	No. 23 NISMO	8	3	Ret	4	WD	3	7	11	37
12	(Japan) Ukyo Sasahara (France) Giuliano Alesi	No. 37 TGR Team Deloitte TOM'S	14	Ret	3	10	5	4	Ret	9	28
13	(Japan) Teppei Natori (Japan) Atsushi Miyake	No. 24 Kondo Racing	9	6	11	7	7	11	9	8	20
14	(Japan) Riki Okusa (Brazil) Igor Omura Fraga	No. 64 Modulo Nakajima Racing	13	12	Ret	12	**12**	**12**	**2**	12	18
15	(Japan) Yuji Kunimoto (Japan) Sena Sakaguchi	No. 19 TGR Team WedsSport Bandoh	12	10	10	13	6	10	12	10	9
16	(Japan) Daiki Sasaki	No. 23 NISMO					8				3
Rank	Driver	Team	OKA	FUJ1	FUJ2	SUZ	SUG	AUT	MOT1	MOT2	Points

Colour	Result
Gold	Winner
Silver	Second place
Bronze	Third place
Green	Points classification
Blue	Non-points classification
Blue	Non-classified finish (NC)
Purple	Retired, not classified (Ret)
Red	Did not qualify (DNQ)
Red	Did not pre-qualify (DNPQ)
Black	Disqualified (DSQ)
White	Did not start (DNS)
White	Withdrew (WD)
White	Race cancelled (C)
Blank	Did not practice (DNP)
Blank	Did not arrive (DNA)
Blank	Excluded (EX)

**Bold** – Pole
Italics – Fastest Lap

Notes

† – Driver did not finish the race, but were classified as they completed over 75% of the race distance.

==== Team' championships ====
Scoring system

Position	1st	2nd	3rd	4th	5th	6th	7th	8th	9th	10th	Lead Lap	-1 Lap	-2 Laps or more
GT500 Points	20	15	11	8	6	5	4	3	2	1	3	2	1

Rank	Team	OKA	FUJ1	FUJ2	SUZ	SUG	AUT	MOT1	MOT2	Points
1	No. 100 Stanley Team Kunimitsu	7^{1}	8^{1}	1^{1}	11^{1}	3^{1}	1^{1}	5^{1}	1^{1}	108
2	No. 36 TGR Team au TOM'S	1^{1}	1^{1}	4^{1}	9^{1}	4^{1}	8^{1}	10^{1}	13^{3}	84
3	No. 17 Astemo Real Racing	10^{2}	9^{2}	5^{1}	2^{1}	1^{1}	14^{3}	6^{1}	2^{1}	84
4	No. 12 Team Impul	3^{1}	7^{1}	12^{2}	6^{1}	13^{3}	5^{1}	1^{1}	3^{1}	78
5	No. 38 TGR Team KeePer Cerumo	2^{1}	13^{3}	6^{1}	5^{1}	10^{1}	2^{1}	11^{1}	4^{1}	72
6	No. 8 Team HRC ARTA Mugen	11^{2}	11^{2}	2^{1}	3^{1}	9^{1}	6^{1}	3^{1}	7^{1}	70
7	No. 16 ARTA Mugen	6^{1}	5^{1}	9^{1}	1^{1}	Ret	9^{1}	8^{1}	6^{1}	64
8	No. 39 TGR Team SARD	5^{1}	4^{1}	8^{1}	Ret	2^{1}	7^{1}	4^{1}	DSQ	62
9	No. 23 NISMO	8^{1}	3^{1}	Ret	4^{1}	8^{1}	3^{1}	7^{1}	11^{1}	61
10	No. 14 TGR Team ENEOS ROOKIE	4^{1}	2^{1}	7^{1}	8^{1}	11^{1}	13^{1}	DSQ	5^{1}	57
11	No. 37 TGR Team Deloitte TOM'S	14^{3}	Ret	3^{1}	10^{1}	5^{1}	4^{1}	Ret	9^{1}	44
12	No. 24 Kondo Racing	9^{1}	6^{1}	11^{1}	7^{1}	7^{1}	11^{1}	9^{1}	8^{1}	44
13	No. 64 Modulo Nakajima Racing	13^{2}	12^{3}	Ret	12^{1}	12^{2}	12^{1}	2^{1}	12^{1}	32
14	No. 19 TGR Team WedsSport Bandoh	12^{2}	10^{2}	10^{1}	13^{3}	6^{1}	10^{1}	12^{1}	10^{1}	29
Rank	Team	OKA	FUJ1	FUJ2	SUZ	SUG	AUT	MOT1	MOT2	Points

=== GT300 ===
==== Drivers' championships ====
Scoring system

Position	1st	2nd	3rd	4th	5th	6th	7th	8th	9th	10th	11th	12th	13th	14th	15th	Pole
GT300 Points	25	20	16	13	11	10	9	8	7	6	5	4	3	2	1	1

Rank	Driver	Team	OKA	FUJ1	FUJ2	SUZ	SUG	AUT	MOT1	MOT2	Points
1	(Brazil) João Paulo de Oliveira (Japan) Iori Kimura	No. 56 Kondo Racing	14	1	5	5	2	12	14	4	88
2	(Germany) Sven Müller	No. 666 Seven x Seven Racing	12	4	6	14	4	DSQ	2	2	82
3	(Japan) Morio Nitta (Japan) Shinichi Takagi	No. 96 K-tunes Racing	7	10	15	26	24	1	1	9	73
4	(Japan) Takashi Kogure (Italy) Daniil Kvyat	No. 88 JLOC	6	24	17	6	8	DSQ	3	**1**	70
5	(Japan) Naoya Gamou (Japan) Togo Suganami	No. 65 K2 R&D LEON Racing	5	2	10	17	16	3	13	7	65
6	(Japan) Yuui Tsutsumi (Japan) Kazuhisa Urabe	No. 2 Hyper Water Racing Inging	2	5	7	20	17	4	12	8	65
7	(Japan) Kiyoshi Umegaki	No. 7 CarGuy MKS Racing		11	3	2	13	7	Ret	6	63
8	(United Kingdom) Charlie Fagg	No. 777 D'station Racing	**1**	7	23	4	21	20	Ret	5	59
9	(United Kingdom) Zak O'Sullivan	No. 7 CarGuy MKS Racing	13	11	3	2	13	7			56
10	(Japan) Taichi Watarai	No. 666 Seven x Seven Racing				14	4	DSQ	2	2	55
11	(Japan) Takuro Shinohara	No. 45 Ponos Racing	20	Ret	**4**	15	11	6	4	10	49
11	(Japan) Shintaro Kawabata	No. 45 Ponos Racing			**4**	15	11	6	4	10	49
12	(Japan) Tomonobu Fujii	No. 777 D'station Racing	**1**	7	23	4	21	20			48
13	(Japan) Takashi Kobayashi (Japan) Kotaro Shimbara	No. 18 Team UpGarage	18	27†	12	3	5	5	23†	11	47
14	(Japan) Ryuichiro Tomita (Japan) Kazuki Oki	No. 11 GAINER	19	14	19	9	6	23	**6**	3	46
15	(Japan) Hiroaki Ishiura	No. 32 Team ENEOS Rookie	16	6	2	10	Ret	10	19	24	42
16	(Japan) Hiroki Yoshimoto (Japan) Shunsuke Kohno	No. 60 LM corsa	10	16	11	13	**1**	24†	15	19	41
17	(Japan) Kazuto Kotaka (Japan) Miki Koyama	No. 31 apr	3	3	14	11	15	Ret	Ret	15	41
18	(Japan) Hiroki Yoshida (Japan) Seita Nonaka	No. 52 Saitama Green Brave	8	9	1	27†	20	Ret	WD	WD	40
19	(Japan) Nobuteru Taniguchi (Japan) Tatsuya Kataoka	No. 4 Goodsmile Racing & TeamUKYO	4	8	13	22	10	17	8	Ret	38
20	(Japan) Yusuke Tomibayashi	No. 9 Pacific Racing Team	23	22	16	**1**	12	21	11	Ret	35
21	(Japan) Tokiya Suzuki	No. 32 Team ENEOS Rookie	16		2	10	Ret	10	19	24	32
22	(Japan) Yoshiaki Katayama (Germany) Niklas Krütten	No. 6 Velorex	9	23	9	18	9	11	10	17	32
23	(Japan) Yuta Fujiwara	No. 9 Pacific Racing Team	23	22	16	**1**	12	21		Ret	30
24	(Japan) Rin Arakawa	No. 360 Tomei Sports	26	19	18	7	18	2	17	18	29
24	(Japan) Yu Kanamaru	No. 360 Tomei Sports	26	19		7	18	2	17	18	29
25	(Japan) Kiyoto Fujinami	No. 666 Seven x Seven Racing	12	4	6	WD					27
26	(Japan) Yuya Motojima (Japan) Kosuke Matsuura	No. 87 JLOC	15	12	25	29†	7	18	7	14	25
27	(Japan) Takuto Iguchi (Japan) Hideki Yamauchi	No. 61 R&D Sport	17	**27**†	28	28†	3	**13**	22†	13	24
28	(Japan) Yusuke Shiotsu	No. 5 Team Mach	11	25	22	8	26	14	9	16	22
28	(Japan) Souta Arao	No. 5 Team Mach	11	25	22	8	WD	14	9	16	22
29	(Japan) Yuya Hiraki (Japan) Reiji Hiraki	No. 62 HELM Motorsports	24	13	8	19	19	8	17	20	19
30	(Japan) Reimei Ito	No. 7 CarGuy MKS Racing	13	11				7			17
31	(Austria) Charlie Wurz	No. 31 apr		3				Ret			16
32	(Japan) Katsuyuki Hiranaka (Japan) Eijiro Shimizu	No. 20 SHADE Racing	28	18	26	21	25	16	5	26	11
33	(Japan) Tsubasa Kondo	No. 777 D'station Racing							Ret	5	11
34	(Japan) Hironobu Yasuda	No. 26 Anest Iwata Racing	21	26	29	23	22	9	DSQ	12	11
34	(Japan) Yusuke Mitsui	No. 26 Anest Iwata Racing						9	DSQ	12	11
35	(Japan) Ritomo Miyata	No. 7 CarGuy MKS Racing							Ret	6	10
36	(Japan) Kamui Kobayashi	No. 32 Team ENEOS Rookie		6							10
37	(South Korea) Lee Jungwoo	No. 26 Anest Iwata Racing	21	26	29	23	22	9			7
38	(Japan) Rintaro Kubo	No. 9 Pacific Racing Team		22				21	11		5
39	(Japan) Kohta Kawaai	No. 87 JLOC		12				18			4
40	(Japan) Hibiki Taira	No. 30 apr	22	21	21	12	Ret	19	Ret	25	4
40	(Japan) Hiroaki Nagai	No. 30 apr	22		21	12	Ret	19			4
41	(Japan) Takamitsu Matsui (Japan) Ryota Horachi	No. 25 Hoppy Team Tsuchiya	27	17	20	16	14	15	18	22	3
42	(United Kingdom) James Pull	No. 48 Nilzz Racing	29	15	24	24	23	25†	20	23	1
42	(Japan) Taiyo Ida	No. 48 Nilzz Racing	29	15	24	24		25†	20		1
42	(Japan) Daiki Fujiwara	No. 48 Nilzz Racing		15			23	25†		23	1
—	(Japan) Haruki Kurosawa	No. 65 K2 R&D LEON Racing		2 (Note: Haruki Kurosawa did not participate in qualifying & not run during the race as a third driver and were ineligible for championship points.)				3 (Note: Atsushi Tanaka, Haruki Kurosawa, and Kento Omiya did not participate in qualifying & not run during the race as a third driver and were ineligible for championship points.)			0
—	(Japan) Atsushi Tanaka	No. 360 Tomei Sports		19				2			0
—	(Japan) Kento Omiya	No. 45 Ponos Racing						6			0
—	(Japan) Hironobu Shimizu	No. 360 Tomei Sports			18						0
—	(Japan) Manabu Orido	No. 30 apr		21				19	Ret	25	0
—	(Japan) Masaki Kano	No. 22 R'Qs Motor Sports	25	20	27	25	DNS	22	21	21	0
—	(Japan) Yuma Shoji	No. 22 R'Qs Motor Sports		20				22		21	0
—	(Japan) Masaki Jyonai	No. 22 R'Qs Motor Sports		20					21		0
—	(Japan) Kei Cozzolino	No. 45 Ponos Racing	20	Ret							0
—	(Japan) Hisashi Wada	No. 22 R'Qs Motor Sports	25		27	25	DNS	22			0
—	(Japan) Natsu Sakaguchi	No. 88 JLOC		24				DSQ			0
—	(Japan) Kimiya Sato	No. 5 Team Mach					26				0
Rank	Driver	Team	OKA	FUJ1	FUJ2	SUZ	SUG	AUT	MOT1	MOT2	Points

Colour	Result
Gold	Winner
Silver	Second place
Bronze	Third place
Green	Points classification
Blue	Non-points classification
Blue	Non-classified finish (NC)
Purple	Retired, not classified (Ret)
Red	Did not qualify (DNQ)
Red	Did not pre-qualify (DNPQ)
Black	Disqualified (DSQ)
White	Did not start (DNS)
White	Withdrew (WD)
White	Race cancelled (C)
Blank	Did not practice (DNP)
Blank	Did not arrive (DNA)
Blank	Excluded (EX)

**Bold** – Pole
Italics – Fastest Lap

Notes

† – Driver did not finish the race, but were classified as they completed over 75% of the race distance.

==== Team' championships ====
Scoring system

Position	1st	2nd	3rd	4th	5th	6th	7th	8th	9th	10th	11th	12th	13th	14th	15th	Lead Lap to -1 Lap	-2 Laps	-3 Laps or more
GT300 Points	25	20	16	13	11	10	9	8	7	6	5	4	3	2	1	3	2	1

Rank	Team	OKA	FUJ1	FUJ2	SUZ	SUG	AUT	MOT1	MOT2	Points
1	No. 56 Kondo Racing	14^{1}	1^{1}	5^{1}	5^{1}	2^{1}	12^{1}	14^{1}	4^{1}	112
2	No. 666 Seven x Seven Racing	12^{1}	4^{1}	6^{1}	14^{1}	4^{1}	DSQ	2^{1}	2^{1}	103
3	No. 96 K-tunes Racing	7^{1}	10^{2}	15^{1}	26^{1}	24^{1}	1^{1}	1^{1}	9^{1}	96
4	No. 65 K2 R&D LEON Racing	5^{1}	2^{1}	10^{1}	17^{1}	16^{1}	3^{1}	13^{1}	7^{1}	89
5	No. 2 Hyper Water Racing Inging	2^{1}	5^{1}	7^{1}	20^{1}	17^{1}	4^{1}	12^{1}	8^{1}	89
6	No. 88 JLOC	6^{1}	24^{3}	17^{1}	6^{1}	8^{1}	DSQ	3^{1}	1^{1}	88
7	No. 7 CarGuy MKS Racing	13^{1}	11^{2}	3^{1}	2^{1}	13^{1}	7^{1}	Ret	6^{1}	86
8	No. 777 D'station Racing	1^{1}	7^{1}	23^{1}	4^{1}	21^{1}	20^{2}	Ret	5^{1}	78
9	No. 45 Ponos Racing	20^{2}	Ret	4^{1}	15^{1}	11^{1}	6^{1}	4^{1}	10^{1}	68
10	No. 18 Team UpGarage	18^{1}	28^{3}	12^{1}	3^{1}	5^{1}	5^{1}	23^{3}	11^{1}	67
11	No. 11 GAINER	19^{1}	14^{2}	19^{1}	9^{1}	6^{1}	23^{3}	6^{1}	3^{1}	66
12	No. 32 Team ENEOS Rookie	16^{1}	6^{1}	2^{1}	10^{1}	Ret	10^{1}	19^{1}	24^{1}	63
13	No. 60 LM corsa	10^{1}	16^{2}	11^{1}	13^{1}	1^{1}	24^{3}	15^{1}	19^{1}	61
14	No. 4 Goodsmile Racing & TeamUKYO	4^{1}	8^{1}	13^{1}	22^{1}	10^{1}	17^{1}	8^{1}	Ret	59
15	No. 31 apr	3^{1}	3^{1}	14^{1}	11^{1}	15^{1}	Ret	Ret	15^{1}	59
16	No. 6 Velorex	9^{1}	23^{3}	9^{1}	18^{1}	9^{1}	11^{1}	10^{1}	17^{1}	54
17	No. 52 Saitama Green Brave	8^{1}	9^{1}	1^{1}	27^{3}	20^{1}	Ret	WD	WD	53
18	No. 9 Pacific Racing Team	23^{2}	22^{3}	16^{1}	1^{1}	12^{1}	21^{2}	11^{1}	Ret	51
19	No. 360 Tomei Sports	26^{3}	19^{3}	18^{1}	7^{1}	18^{1}	2^{1}	17^{1}	18^{1}	49
20	No. 87 JLOC	15^{1}	12^{2}	25^{2}	29^{3}	7^{1}	18^{1}	7^{1}	14^{1}	45
21	No. 5 Team Mach	11^{1}	25^{3}	22^{1}	8^{1}	26^{3}	14^{1}	9^{1}	16^{1}	42
22	No. 62 HELM Motorsports	24^{2}	13^{2}	8^{1}	19^{1}	19^{1}	8^{1}	16^{1}	20^{1}	41
23	No. 61 R&D Sport	17^{1}	27^{3}	28^{2}	28^{3}	3^{1}	13^{1}	22^{3}	13^{1}	39
24	No. 20 SHADE Racing	28^{3}	18^{3}	26^{2}	21^{1}	25^{1}	16^{1}	5^{1}	26^{3}	28
25	No. 26 Anest Iwata Racing	21^{2}	26^{3}	29^{3}	23^{1}	22^{1}	9^{1}	DSQ	12^{1}	27
26	No. 25 Hoppy Team Tsuchiya	27^{3}	17^{2}	20^{1}	16^{1}	14^{1}	15^{1}	18^{1}	22^{1}	24
27	No. 48 Nilzz Racing	29^{3}	15^{2}	23^{1}	24^{1}	23^{1}	25^{3}	20^{1}	23^{1}	20
28	No. 30 apr	22^{2}	21^{3}	21^{1}	12^{1}	Ret	19^{1}	Ret	25^{2}	18
29	No. 22 R'Qs Motor Sports	25^{2}	20^{3}	27^{2}	25^{1}	DNS	22^{2}	21^{1}	21^{1}	16
Rank	Team	OKA	FUJ1	FUJ2	SUZ	SUG	AUT	MOT1	MOT2	Points
