= Naoki Yamamoto (racing driver) =

Japanese racing driver

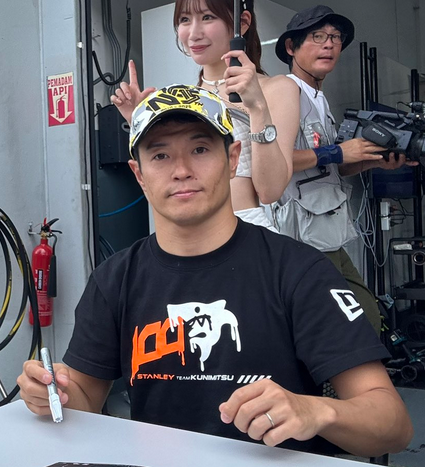
- Yamamoto at the 2025 Super GT Malaysia Festival
- Nationality: (Japan) Japanese
- Born: July 11, 1988 (age 38) Utsunomiya, Japan

Super GT - GT500 career
- Debut season: 2010
- Current team: Team Kunimitsu
- Car number: 100
- Former teams: Dome Racing
- Starts: 133
- Wins: 11
- Podiums: 39
- Poles: 6
- Fastest laps: 7
- Best finish: 1st in 2018, 2020, 2026

Previous series
- 2013–24 2010–12 2008–09: Super Formula; Formula Nippon; All-Japan Formula Three

Championship titles
- 2013, 18, 20 2018, 20, 26 2009: Super Formula; Super GT - GT500; All-Japan Formula Three National Class

Naoki Yamamoto (山本尚貴, Yamamoto Naoki; born July 11, 1988) is a Japanese racing driver for Honda Racing Corporation, currently driving in Super GT with Team Kunimitsu. He is a three-time champion in both Super Formula and the GT500 class of Super GT. Yamamoto is also the only driver to have won both the Super Formula and GT500 championships in the same season multiple times, a feat which he accomplished in 2018 and 2020. He announced his retirement from Super Formula at the end of 2024.

== Career ==
=== Early career ===
Yamamoto started karting in 1994, and won the All-Japan Kart Championship FA class title in 2002. In 2006, he graduated from the Suzuka Circuit Racing School Formula (SRS-F) with a scholarship to compete in Formula Challenge Japan (FCJ). In 2007, he joined the Honda Formula Dream Project (HFDP) academy, and finished second in the Formula Challenge Japan championship with two wins in his first season in single-seaters. He moved up to the Japanese Formula 3 Championship with Honda Team Real in 2008, finishing fifth in the championship class with one win. In 2009, he moved to the National Class with HFDP Racing (also managed by Real Racing), and won the class title with eight wins in sixteen races.

=== Super GT ===
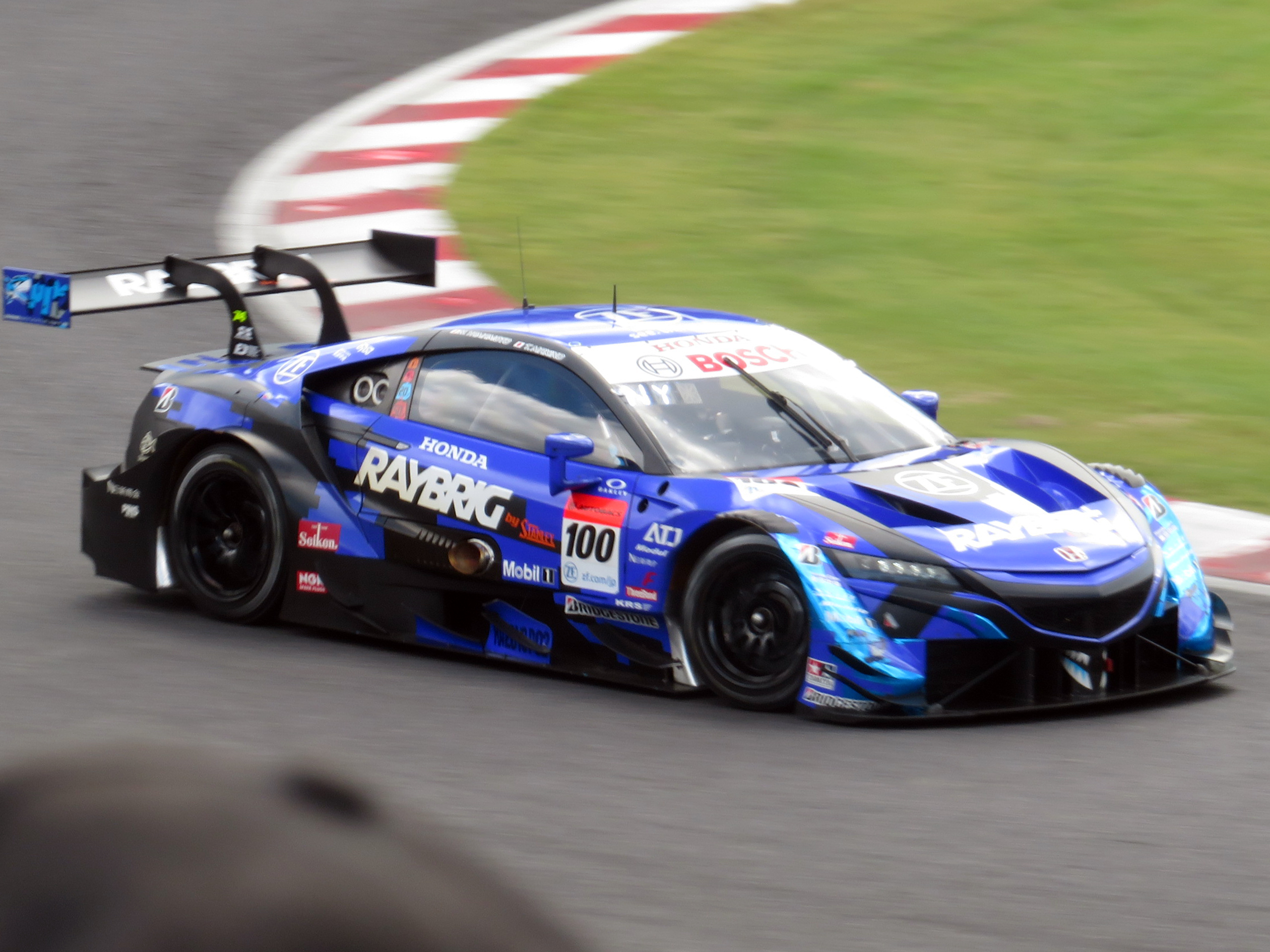
Yamamoto won his second Super GT championship in 2020.

Yamamoto debuted in the Super GT Series in 2010, driving a Honda HSV-010 GT for Team Kunimitsu alongside co-driver Takuya Izawa. He scored a podium on his debut at Suzuka, and took another third place at the Suzuka endurance round. During the following two seasons, he scored three more podium finishes. Yamamoto was fifth in the drivers' standings in 2012, the best result for a Honda driver that season.

In 2013, Yamamoto transferred to the Weider Modulo Dome Racing team, and took his first Super GT victory at the Suzuka 1000km endurance race. He and co-driver Frédéric Makowiecki finished fourth in the championship, a career best for Yamamoto. In 2014, he won the summer race at Fuji to take the first win for the new Honda NSX Concept-GT car. Yamamoto, who shared the car with Makowiecki, Izawa, and Jean-Karl Vernay during the season, finished fourth in the drivers' championship for the second consecutive season.

Yamamoto returned to Team Kunimitsu in 2015, reuniting with Izawa. He won at Sugo that season, and finished a career-best third in the championship. Over the following two seasons, Yamamoto would score three more podium finishes, including a third place in the 2017 Suzuka 1000km.

Ahead of the 2018 season, 2009 Formula One world champion Jenson Button joined Team Kunimitsu as Yamamoto's co-driver. In their first race together at Okayama, Yamamoto and Button finished second. They finished second again at Suzuka in May, then won at Sportsland Sugo and finished third at Motegi to clinch the GT500 Drivers' and Teams' Championships. It was the first JGTC/Super GT title for Team Kunimitsu, and having won Super Formula earlier that year, Yamamoto became the first driver to win both titles in the same year in fourteen years.

Yamamoto and Button finished the 2019 season in eighth with two podiums. After the season, Button left Super GT, and Yamamoto was joined by Tadasuke Makino for the 2020 season. Yamamoto scored seven top-six finishes in eight races in 2020, including three podium finishes. In the final round at Fuji, Yamamoto was running in second place on the final lap, until race leader Ryo Hirakawa of TGR Team KeePer TOM's ran out of fuel coming out of the final corner. Yamamoto was able to overtake Hirakawa to take the victory and clinch his and Team Kunimitsu's second set of GT500 titles in three years.

In 2021, after winning the third race of the year at Motegi with Makino, Yamamoto established a points lead as high as 16 points before the penultimate round. He was in position to win his third GT500 title in four years at the final race at Fuji, but was taken out of contention after being hit by GT300 class Honda driver Ren Sato. Yamamoto finished the year third in the championship.

In the first race for Team Kunimitsu since the death of founder Kunimitsu Takahashi, Yamamoto and Makino finished second at Okayama to start the 2022 season. They ended the year with a win at Motegi from pole position, as Yamamoto finished third in the championship for the second consecutive season. After the race, Yamamoto, Makino, and team principal Kazuhiro Kojima carried a portrait of Takahashi with them to the post-race interviews.

Yamamoto suffered a violent crash during the sixth round of the 2023 season at Sugo, when his car hit the guardrail and flipped over after colliding with a GT300 car along the frontstretch. He was diagnosed with a neck injury which forced him to miss the rest of the Super GT and Super Formula seasons. He returned in time to start the 2024 season, and Yamamoto and Makino finished third in the opening round at Okayama.

=== Super Formula ===
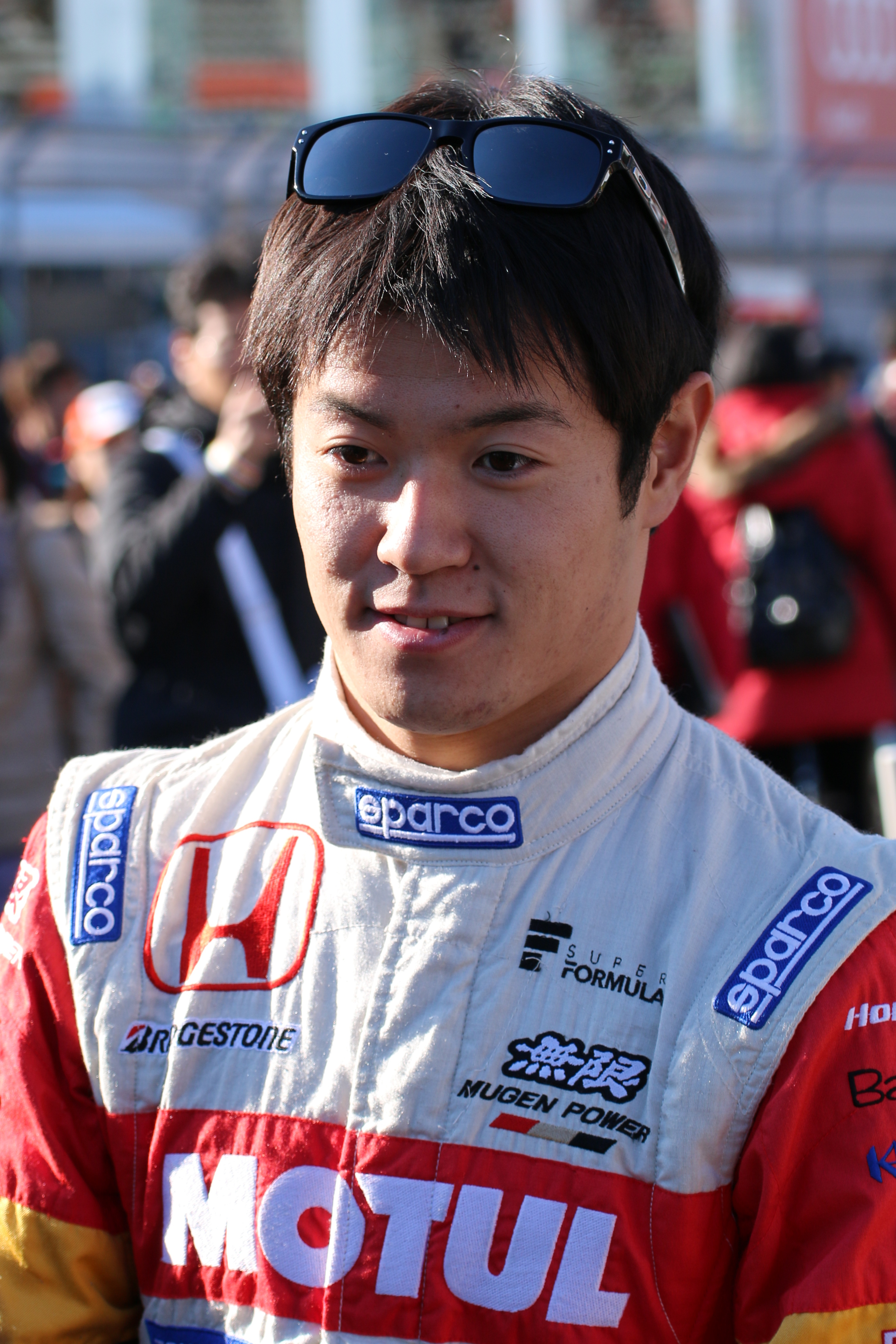
Yamamoto in 2013

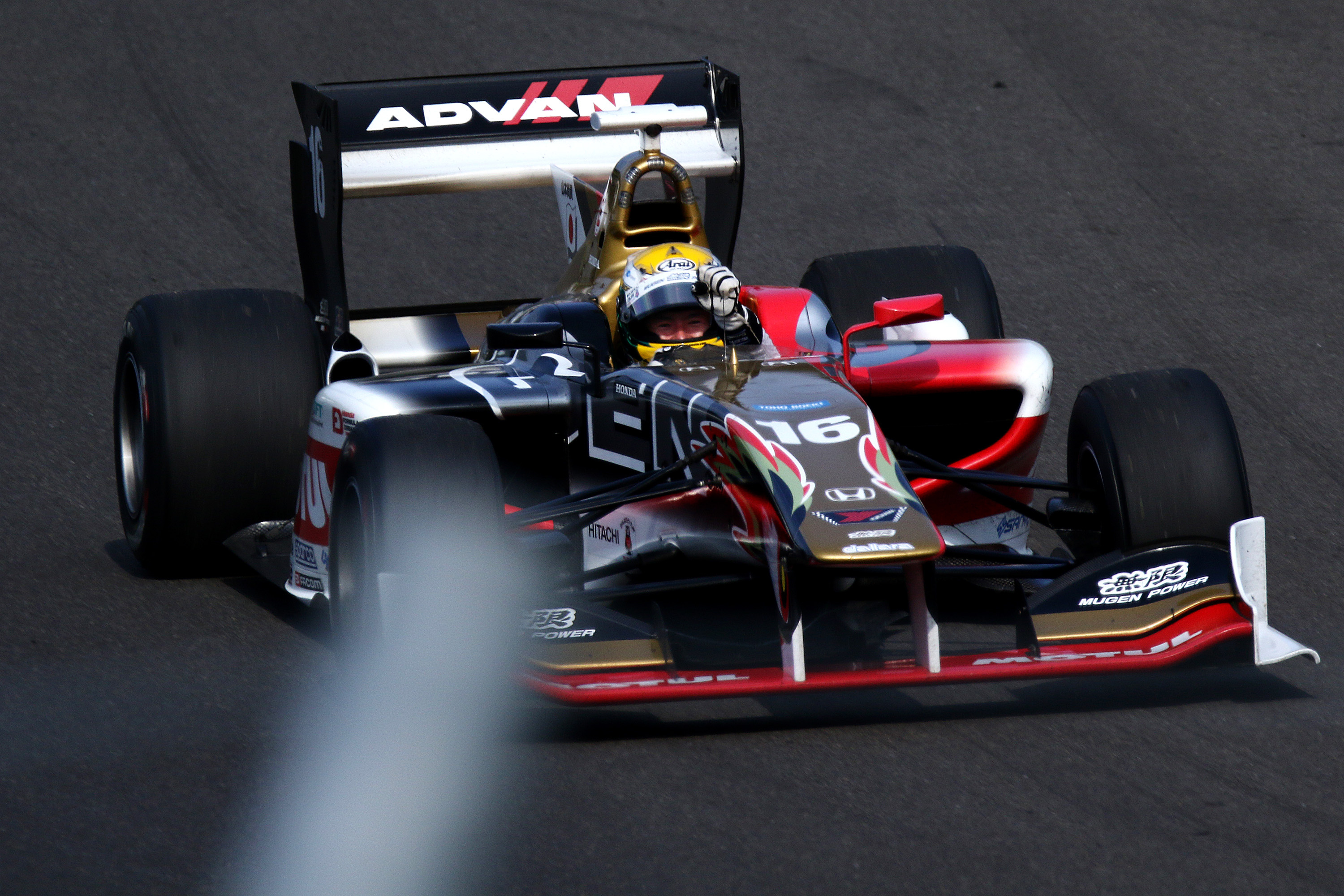
Yamamoto celebrating a Super Formula win at Sugo in 2018

Yamamoto entered the Super Formula Championship (then known as Formula Nippon) in 2010, driving a Honda-powered car for Nakajima Racing. He scored seven top-seven finishes in the eight races of 2010, finishing seventh in the overall standings in his first year while also claiming Rookie of the Year honours. He moved to Team Mugen in 2011 and took pole position at Suzuka in his first race with the team, but did not finish after being involved in a first lap incident.

The 2013 season saw him score five podiums and a maiden series victory. He finished the 2013 tied with the same number of points as André Lotterer, who also had more wins on the season. However, the championship tiebreaker in Super Formula at the time went to the driver that scored the most points at the last race meeting of the season at Suzuka. Yamamoto's win and third-place finish in the double-header finale at Suzuka were enough to win the championship ahead of Lotterer, who missed the finale due to his commitments in the FIA World Endurance Championship with Audi.

After the introduction of the new Dallara SF14 in 2014, Yamamoto took five pole positions, four podiums and two wins (both at Suzuka) from 2014 to 2017, and was the leading Honda driver in the standings in 2014 and 2015. He won his second championship in 2018, with three wins on the season including the first and last rounds at Suzuka, the latter of which clinched his second title ahead of Nick Cassidy.

Yamamoto switched teams to Dandelion Racing for the 2019 season. He began the year with three podiums and a win in the first three races of the season, but went on to finish runner-up in the championship behind Cassidy. He won the championship for the third time in 2020, by just two points over Ryo Hirakawa (whom he had also defeated to win the GT500 title earlier that year). This made him the first driver to win both the GT500 and Super Formula championships in the same year on multiple occasions. It also made him only the fourth driver to win three or more Japanese Top Formula championships, joining six-time champion Kazuyoshi Hoshino, five-time champion Satoru Nakajima, and four-time champion Satoshi Motoyama.

With his third championship and second 'double championship' secured, Yamamoto moved back to Nakajima Racing for the 2021 season. For the first time since 2014, Yamamoto failed to win a race or record a podium finish, slumping to a career-worst 13th place in the championship.

Yamamoto's winless drought came to an end during the seventh round of the championship at Motegi when he won a wet race from pole position. His 2023 season ended prematurely after the Super GT crash at Sportsland Sugo. He recorded three top-ten finishes and was 12th in points at the time of the accident. However, he recovered in time to start the 2024 season, and finished third in his return at the opening race at Suzuka.

=== Formula One ===
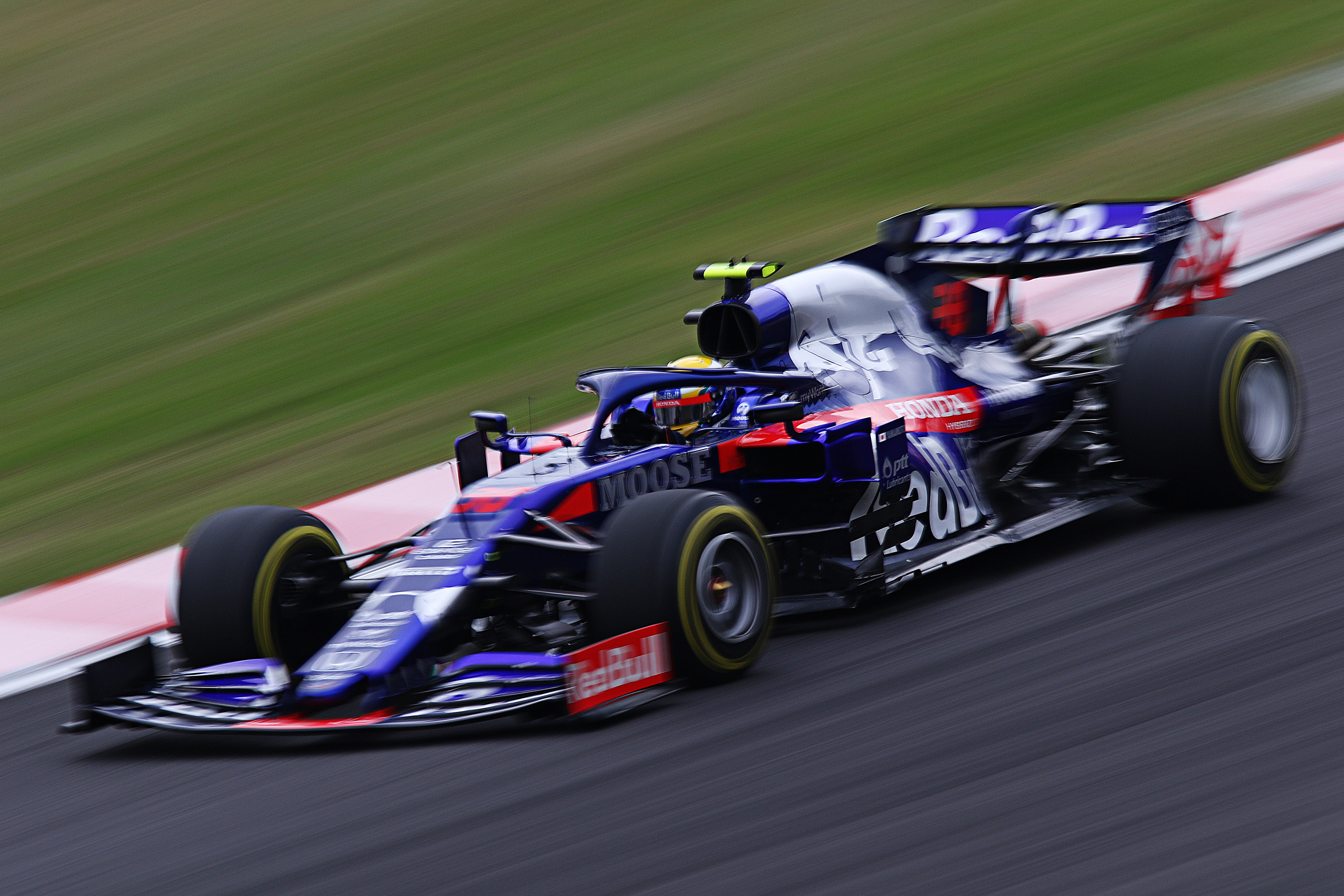
Yamamoto driving during practice for the 2019 Japanese Grand Prix

After winning the GT500 and Super Formula titles in 2018, Yamamoto had accumulated the requisite 40 points required to attain an FIA Super License and compete in Formula One. Yamamoto would get his first chance to drive a Formula One car in 2019, when he drove for Scuderia Toro Rosso-Honda in the first practice session of the Japanese Grand Prix. He completed the most laps in the session and set a fastest lap time just 0.1s off the pace of regular driver Daniil Kvyat. This participation made him the first Japanese driver to drive during a Formula One Grand Prix session since Kamui Kobayashi in 2014.

Despite the impressive performance, Yamamoto was not selected by Toro Rosso (who had changed their name to Scuderia AlphaTauri) or Red Bull Racing for an F1 race seat in 2020.

== Racing record ==
=== Career summary ===
Season	Series	Team	Races	Wins	Poles	F/Laps	Podiums	Points	Position
2007	Formula Challenge Japan		18	2	4	2	8	158	**2nd**
2008	Japanese Formula 3 Championship	Honda Team Real	18	1	0	0	2	138	5th
2009	Japanese Formula 3 Championship - National	HFDP Racing	16	8	6	6	12	121	**1st**
2010	Formula Nippon	Nakajima Racing	8	0	0	0	0	20.5	7th
2010	Super GT - GT500	Team Kunimitsu	7	0	0	0	2	40	8th
2011	Formula Nippon	Team Mugen	7	0	1	1	0	5	11th
2011	Super GT - GT500	Team Kunimitsu	7	0	0	0	1	37	9th
2012	Formula Nippon	Team Mugen	8	0	0	0	0	4	11th
2012	Super GT - GT500	Team Kunimitsu	7	0	0	0	2	43	5th
2013	Super Formula	Team Mugen	7	1	0	2	5	37	**1st**
2013	Super GT - GT500	Weider Modulo Dome Racing	8	1	0	2	1	56	4th
2014	Super Formula	Team Mugen	9	0	2	0	0	14.5	9th
2014	Super GT - GT500	Weider Modulo Dome Racing	8	1	0	2	3	64	4th
2015	Super Formula	Team Mugen	8	1	2	0	2	26	5th
2015	Super GT - GT500	Team Kunimitsu	8	1	0	0	3	60	**3rd**
2016	Super Formula	Team Mugen	8	1	1	0	1	15.5	8th
2016	Super GT - GT500	Team Kunimitsu	8	0	0	0	1	20	14th
2017	Super Formula	Team Mugen	7	0	0	0	1	10.5	9th
2017	Super GT - GT500	Team Kunimitsu	8	0	1	1	2	45	7th
2018	Super Formula	Team Mugen	6	3	2	0	3	38	**1st**
2018	Super GT - GT500	Team Kunimitsu	8	1	1	0	4	78	**1st**
2019	Super Formula	Docomo Team Dandelion Racing	7	1	1	0	3	33	**2nd**
2019	Super GT - GT500	Team Kunimitsu	8	0	0	2	2	37	8th
2019	Formula One	Red Bull Toro Rosso Honda	Test driver						
2020	Super Formula	Docomo Team Dandelion Racing	7	1	1	2	3	62	**1st**
2020	Super GT - GT500	Team Kunimitsu	8	1	0	0	3	69	**1st**
2021	Super Formula	TCS Nakajima Racing	7	0	0	0	0	13	13th
2021	Super GT - GT500	Team Kunimitsu	8	1	1	0	2	60	**3rd**
2022	Super Formula	TCS Nakajima Racing	10	1	1	1	1	32	10th
2022	Super GT - GT500	Team Kunimitsu	8	1	1	0	3	62	**3rd**
2023	Super Formula	TCS Nakajima Racing	7	0	0	0	0	14	13th
2023	Super GT - GT500	Team Kunimitsu	6	0	1	0	1	31	11th
2024	Super GT - GT500	Stanley Team Kunimitsu	8	0	0	0	2	64	**2nd**
2024	Super Formula	PONOS Nakajima Racing	8	0	0	2	1	41	8th
2025	Super GT - GT500	Stanley Team Kunimitsu	8	1	0	0	3	63	**2nd**
2026	Super GT - GT500	Stanley Team Kunimitsu	8	3	1	1	4	85	**1st**

=== Complete Japanese Formula 3 Championship results ===
(key) (Races in bold indicate pole position) (Races in italics indicate fastest lap)

Year	Team	Engine	Class	1	2	3	4	5	6	7	8	9	10	11	12	13	14	15	16	17	18	DC	Points
2008	Honda Team Real	Mugen		FUJ; 1; 5	FUJ; 2; 7	AUT; 1; 5	AUT; 2; 5	SUZ; 1 Ret	SUZ; 2; 4	MOT; 1; 5	MOT; 2 Ret	OKA; 1; 1	OKA; 2; 4	SUZ; 1; 3	SUZ; 2; 4	MOT; 1; 5	MOT; 2; 5	FUJ; 1; 6	FUJ; 2; 6	SUG; 1; 5	SUG; 2; 7	5th	138
2009	HFDP Racing	Toyota	N	FUJ; 1; 12	FUJ; 2; 8	OKA; 1 Ret	OKA; 2; 6	SUZ; 1; 8	SUZ; 2; 7	FUJ; 1; 7	FUJ; 2; 8	**SUZ**; **1**; 12	**SUZ**; **2**; 7	**MOT**; **1**; 8	MOT; 2; 8	**AUT**; **1**; 8	**AUT**; **2**; 8	SUG; 1; 12	**SUG**; **2**; 5			1st	121

=== Complete Super GT results ===
Year	Team	Car	Class	1	2	3	4	5	6	7	8	9	DC	Points
2010	Team Kunimitsu	Honda HSV-010 GT	GT500	SUZ; 3	OKA; 8	FUJ; 10	SEP; 5	SUG; 8	SUZ; 3	FUJ; C	MOT; 6		8th	40
2011	Team Kunimitsu	Honda HSV-010 GT	GT500	OKA; 2	FUJ; 12	SEP; 7	SUG; 7	SUZ; Ret	FUJ; 5	AUT; 14	MOT; 4		9th	37
2012	Team Kunimitsu	Honda HSV-010 GT	GT500	OKA; 2	FUJ; 2	SEP; 6	SUG; 8	SUZ; 11	FUJ; 12	AUT; 8	MOT; 9		5th	43
2013	Weider Modulo Dome Racing	Honda HSV-010 GT	GT500	OKA; 5	FUJ; 10	SEP; 4	SUG; Ret	SUZ; 1	FUJ; 5	AUT; 5	MOT; 7		4th	56
2014	Weider Modulo Dome Racing	Honda NSX Concept-GT	GT500	OKA; 5	FUJ; 10	AUT; 7	SUG; 8	FUJ; 1	SUZ; 3	BUR; 5	MOT; 3		4th	64
2015	Team Kunimitsu	Honda NSX Concept-GT	GT500	OKA; 2	FUJ; Ret	CHA; Ret	FUJ; 5	SUZ; 5	SUG; 1	AUT; 11	MOT; 3		3rd	60
2016	Team Kunimitsu	Honda NSX Concept-GT	GT500	OKA; 10	FUJ; Ret	SUG; 10	FUJ; 3	SUZ; 7	CHA; 10	MOT; 10	MOT; 12		14th	20
2017	Team Kunimitsu	Honda NSX-GT	GT500	OKA; Ret	FUJ; 6	**AUT**; 3	SUG; 9	FUJ; 8	SUZ; 3	CHA; 7	MOT; 5		7th	45
2018	Team Kunimitsu	Honda NSX-GT	GT500	OKA; 2	FUJ; 9	SUZ; 2	CHA; 11	FUJ; 5	**SUG**; 1	AUT; 5	MOT; 3		1st	78
2019	Team Kunimitsu	Honda NSX-GT	GT500	OKA; 15	FUJ; 3	SUZ; 13	CHA; 12	FUJ; 2	AUT; Ret	SUG; 8	MOT; 6		8th	37
2020	Team Kunimitsu	Honda NSX-GT	GT500	FUJ; 6	FUJ; 5	SUZ; 2	MOT; 5	FUJ; 5	SUZ; Ret	MOT; 3	FUJ; 1		1st	69
2021	Team Kunimitsu	Honda NSX-GT	GT500	OKA; 8	FUJ; 4	**MOT**; 1	SUZ; 4	SUG; 2	AUT; 6	MOT; 12	FUJ; 14		3rd	60
2022	Team Kunimitsu	Honda NSX-GT	GT500	OKA; 2	FUJ; 5‡	SUZ; 9	FUJ; 8	SUZ; 11	SUG; 8	AUT; 2	**MOT**; 1		3rd	62
2023	Team Kunimitsu	Honda NSX-GT	GT500	OKA; 12	**FUJ**; 2	SUZ; 5	FUJ; 6	SUZ; 7	SUG; Ret	AUT	MOT		11th	31
2024	Stanley Team Kunimitsu	Honda Civic Type R-GT	GT500	OKA; 3	FUJ; 7	SUZ; 7	FUJ; 2	SUG; 5	AUT; 4	MOT; 6	SUZ; 4		2nd	64
2025	Stanley Team Kunimitsu	Honda Civic Type R-GT	GT500	OKA; 4	FUJ; 3	SEP; 6	FS1 (7)	FS2; 12	SUZ; 10	SUG; 6	AUT; 1	MOT; 3	2nd	63
2026	Stanley Team Kunimitsu	Honda Prelude-GT	GT500	OKA; 7	FUJ; 8	FUJ; 1	SUZ; 11	SUG; 3	AUT; 1	MOT; 5	**MOT**; 1		1st	85

^{‡} Half points awarded as less than 75% of race distance was completed.
^{(Number)} Driver did not take part in this sprint race, points are still awarded for the teammate's result.

=== Complete Super Formula results ===
(key) (Races in bold indicate pole position) (Races in italics indicate fastest lap)

Year	Team	Engine	1	2	3	4	5	6	7	8	9	10	DC	Points
2010	Nakajima Racing	Honda	SUZ; 7	MOT; 5	FUJ; 7	MOT; 4	SUG; Ret	AUT; 5	SUZ; 6	SUZ; 5			7th	20.5
2011	Team Mugen	Honda	**SUZ**; Ret	AUT; 5	FUJ; 9	MOT; 14	SUZ; C	SUG; 11	MOT; 12	MOT; Ret			11th	5
2012	Team Mugen	Honda	SUZ; 7	MOT; 7	AUT; 9	FUJ; 12	MOT; Ret	SUG; 14	SUZ; 15	SUZ; Ret			11th	4
2013	Team Mugen	Honda	SUZ; 4	AUT; 3	FUJ; 3	MOT; 8	SUG; 3	**SUZ**; 1	**SUZ**; 3				1st	37
2014	Team Mugen	Honda	SUZ; 11	FUJ; Ret	FUJ; 5	FUJ; 5	MOT; 15	**AUT**; 7	**SUG**; 7	SUZ; 7	SUZ; 6		9th	14.5
2015	Team Mugen	Honda	**SUZ**; 15	OKA; 4	FUJ; 12	MOT; 8	AUT; 7	SUG; 2	SUZ; 14	**SUZ**; 1			5th	26
2016	Team Mugen	Honda	**SUZ**; 1	OKA; 5	FUJ; Ret	MOT; 8	OKA; 10	OKA; 6	SUG; 14	SUZ; 19	SUZ; Ret		8th	15.5
2017	Team Mugen	Honda	SUZ; 2	OKA; 5	OKA; 8	FUJ; Ret	MOT; 13	AUT; 16	SUG; 18	SUZ; C	SUZ; C		9th	10.5
2018	Team Mugen	Honda	**SUZ**; 1	AUT; C	SUG; 1	FUJ; 8	MOT; 7	OKA; 10	**SUZ**; 1				1st	38
2019	Docomo Team Dandelion Racing	Honda	SUZ; 2	AUT; 2	**SUG**; 1	FUJ; 11	MOT; 9	OKA; 7	SUZ; 5				2nd	33
2020	Docomo Team Dandelion Racing	Honda	MOT; 13	OKA; 6	SUG; 3	AUT; 2^{3}	**SUZ**; 1^{1}	SUZ; Ret	FUJ; 5^{3}				1st	62
2021	TCS Nakajima Racing	Honda	FUJ; 6	SUZ; 8	AUT; 9‡	SUG; 12	MOT; 12	MOT; Ret^{2}	SUZ; 9				13th	13
2022	TCS Nakajima Racing	Honda	FUJ; 14	FUJ; 14	SUZ; 9	AUT; 14	SUG; 12	FUJ; 9	**MOT**; 1^{1}	MOT; 16	SUZ; 11	SUZ; 6	10th	32
2023	TCS Nakajima Racing	Honda	FUJ; 4	FUJ; 15	SUZ; 11	AUT; 9	SUG; 13	FUJ; 7	MOT; Ret	SUZ	SUZ		13th	14
2024	PONOS Nakajima Racing	Honda	SUZ; 3	AUT; 4^{3}	SUG; DNS	FUJ; 10	MOT; 4	FUJ; 8	FUJ; Ret	SUZ; 7	SUZ; 6		8th	41

^{‡} Half points awarded as less than 75% of race distance was completed.

=== Complete Formula One participations ===
(key)

Year	Entrant	Chassis	Engine	1	2	3	4	5	6	7	8	9	10	11	12	13	14	15	16	17	18	19	20	21	WDC	Points
2019	Red Bull Toro Rosso Honda	Scuderia Toro Rosso STR14	Honda RA619H 1.6 V6 t	AUS	BHR	CHN	AZE	ESP	MON	CAN	FRA	AUT	GBR	GER	HUN	BEL	ITA	SIN	RUS	JPN; TD	MEX	USA	BRA	ABU	–	–

Sporting positions
Preceded by Kazuki Nakajima (Formula Nippon)	Super Formula; Champion; 2013	Succeeded by Kazuki Nakajima
Preceded by Hiroaki Ishiura	Super Formula; Champion; 2018	Succeeded by Nick Cassidy
Preceded by Ryo Hirakawa; Nick Cassidy	Super GT; GT500 Champion; 2018; With: Jenson Button	Succeeded by Kazuya Oshima; Kenta Yamashita
Preceded by Kazuya Oshima; Kenta Yamashita	Super GT; GT500 Champion; 2020; With: Tadasuke Makino	Succeeded by Sho Tsuboi; Yuhi Sekiguchi
Preceded by Nick Cassidy	Super Formula; Champion; 2020	Succeeded by Tomoki Nojiri
Preceded by Sho Tsuboi; Kenta Yamashita	Super GT; GT500 Champion; 2026; With: Tadasuke Makino	Succeeded by Incumbent
