= Team Kunimitsu =

Japanese racing team

(Japan) Team Kunimitsu
- Founded: 1992
- Base: Shinjuku, Tokyo, Japan
- Team principal(s): Kazuhiro Kojima
- Founder(s): Kunimitsu Takahashi
- Current series: Super GT
- Current drivers: Naoki Yamamoto; Tadasuke Makino
- Teams' Championships: Super GT: 3 (2018, 2020, 2026)
- Drivers' Championships: Super GT: 3 (2018, 2020, 2026)
- Website: teamkunimitsu.net

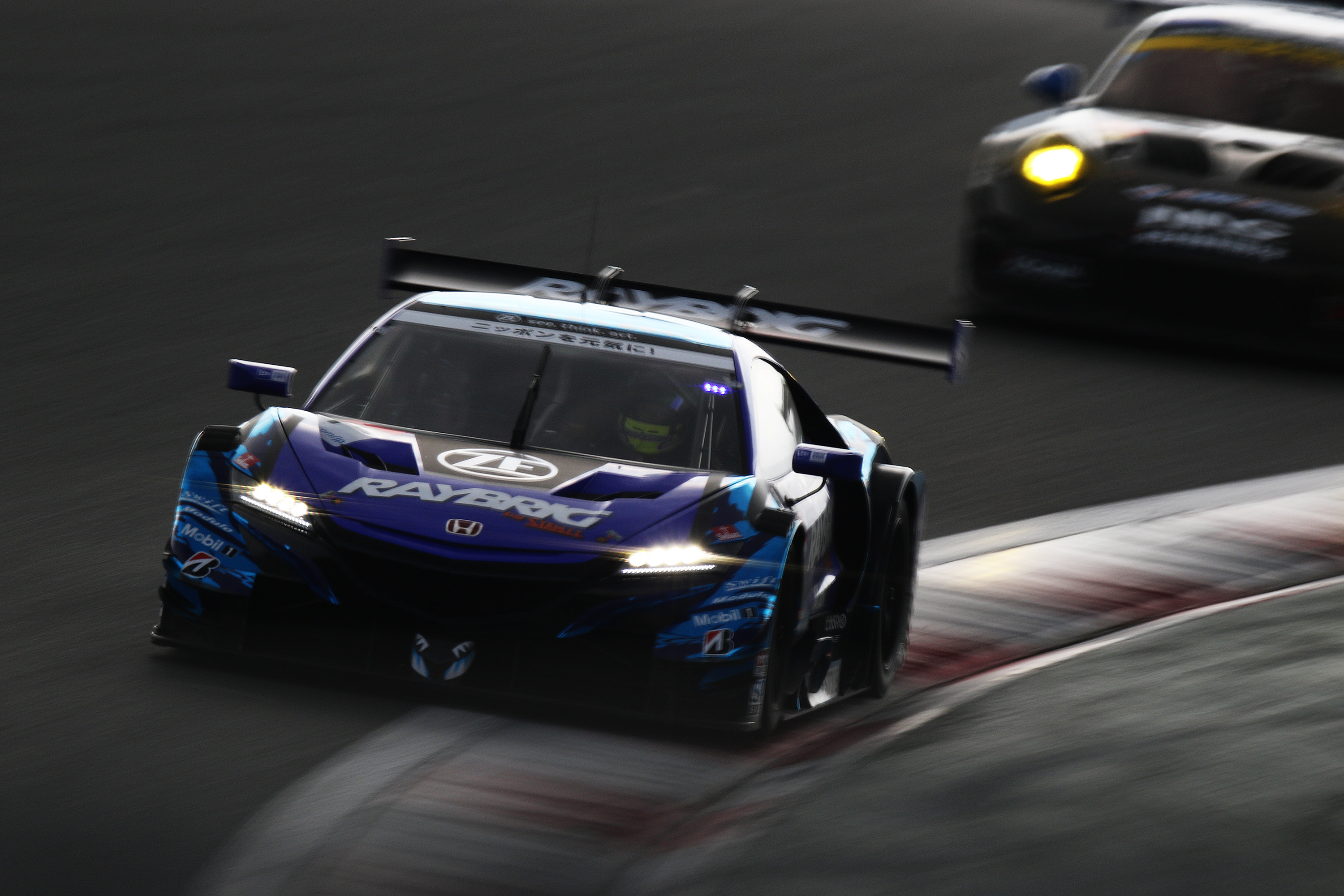
The Team Kunimitsu Honda NSX-GT at the Fuji Speedway for the 2019 Super GT Series test

Team Kunimitsu is a racing team founded in 1992 by Kunimitsu Takahashi. The team has competed in the Super GT Series (formerly known as the All-Japan GT Championship) since 1994.

In its early years, the team participated in the Japanese Touring Car Championship, and in 1995 it won the 24 Hours of Le Mans in the GT2 class. In 1996, Team Kunimitsu became the first team to enter a Honda vehicle in JGTC/Super GT, and the team has been part of the marque's factory programme in the series since its inception in 1997, having achieved many of their early successes. The team had won several races and finished as high as second in the 2006 drivers' standings and third in 2007 and 2015, before winning their first titles in 2018 and winning them again in 2020.

== History ==
Team Kunimitsu was founded in 1992, and that year it participated in the Japanese Touring Car Championship (JTC) in partnership with Team Taisan, fielding a Group A Nissan Skyline GT-R R32. It was driven by team founder Kunimitsu Takahashi alongside Keiichi Tsuchiya, and the pair took four podiums in the JTC-1 class during the 1992 season, before taking an overall victory at Autopolis the following year.

In 1994, the team began participating in the All-Japan GT Championship (JGTC) with a Porsche 911 RSR Turbo in the GT1 class, and now independently participated in the new Super Touring era of the Japanese Touring Car Championship (JTCC) with a Honda Civic Ferio. In JGTC, Takahashi and Tsuchiya scored a win at Sportsland Sugo that season and took another podium at the following race, while in JTCC Tsuchiya scored four points finishes, which included two fourth places. The team continued with the Porsche in JGTC for 1995, scoring a podium at Fuji Speedway, but the 1995 season was the team's last in the JTCC, a season which yielded two points finishes and a best result of sixth place.

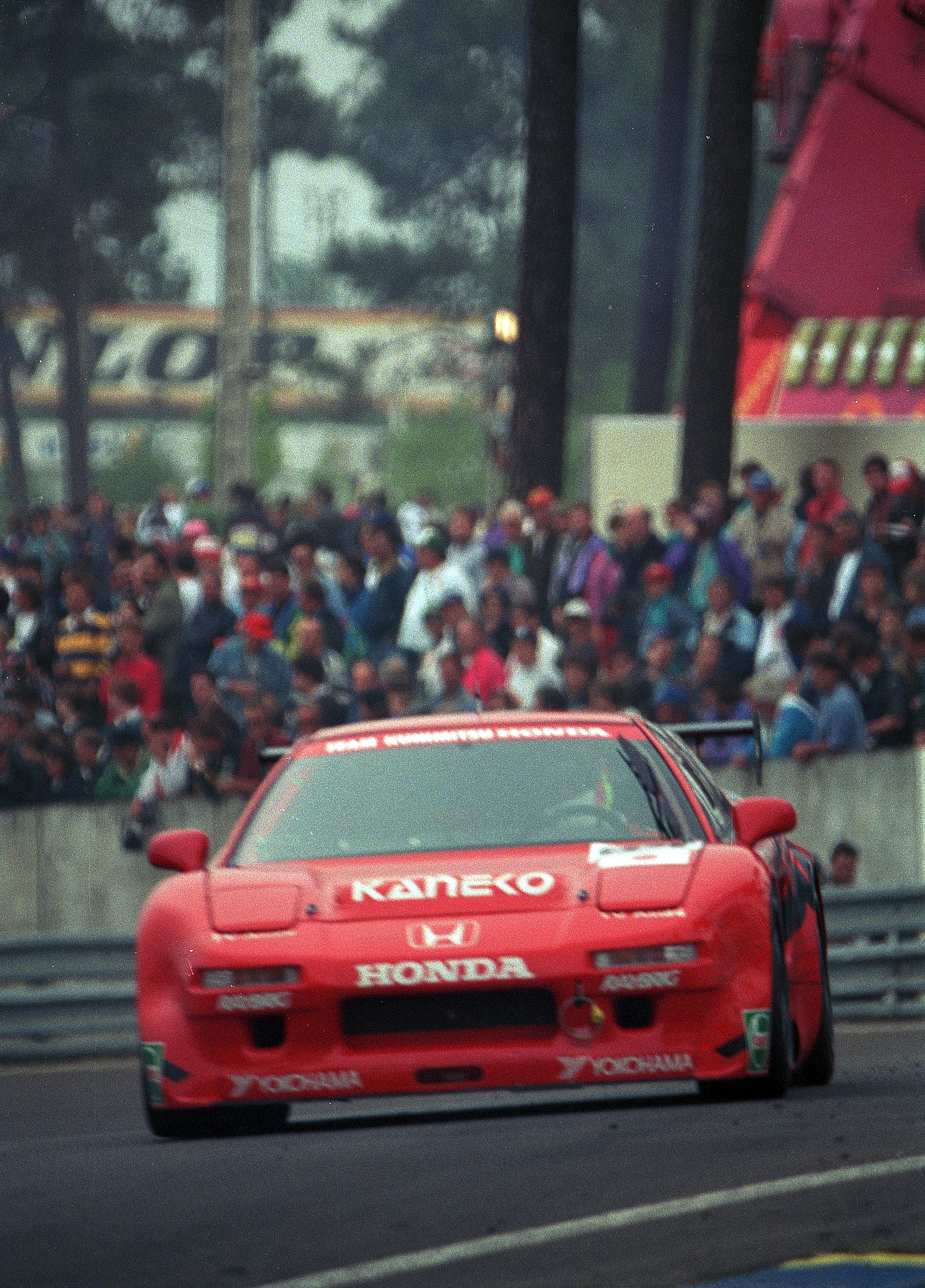
Team Kunimitsu won the 1995 24 Hours of Le Mans in the GT2 class.

Between 1994 and 1996, the team competed in several endurance races – including the 24 Hours of Le Mans – with a Honda NSX GT2 driven by Takahashi, Tsuchiya and Akira Iida. In 1994, they completed the 24 Hours of Le Mans in association with Kremer Racing, and won the GT2 class at the Suzuka 1000km and Tokachi 24 Hours races. Team Kunimitsu entered the NSX GT2 for the 1995 24 Hours of Le Mans, and after Takahashi, Tsuchiya and Iida completed 275 laps in mostly wet conditions, the team took victory in the GT2 class and finished eight overall, scoring Honda's first win at the event. In 1995, they also took another class win at the Suzuka 1000 km and won the Tokachi 24 Hours overall. The team returned to Le Mans in 1996, taking third place in the GT2 class.

For the 1996 JGTC season, the team entered the Honda NSX GT2 in the renamed GT500 class, becoming the first team in the series to field a Honda vehicle, although without full factory support. As a GT2-specification car, it had a power deficit against the dedicated GT500 and GT1 cars, but the team scored three points finishes and a best result of seventh.

In 1997, Honda entered the JGTC with a full factory programme and an NSX directly built to the GT500 regulations, and Team Kunimitsu was one of two teams to run the car that season. The team also received a new title sponsor in the form of automotive lighting brand Raybrig, who had already sponsored them in various capacities since 1995. The Raybrig NSX, driven by Takahashi and Iida, scored the first two podiums for Honda in the JGTC in the last two races of the season, also taking pole position in the final round. In 1998, the team took their first victory in Raybrig colours after winning from pole at the Mine Circuit, while scoring a total of three pole positions during the year. 1999 was the last year that team founder Kunimitsu Takahashi competed as a driver; he and Iida won the Golden Week race at Fuji Speedway by over 40 seconds, bringing the final victory for Takahashi's four-decade-long racing career and making him the oldest winner in series history at the age of 59. It also marked the sixth (seventh including non-championship races) consecutive win for Honda, setting the winning streak record for manufacturers.

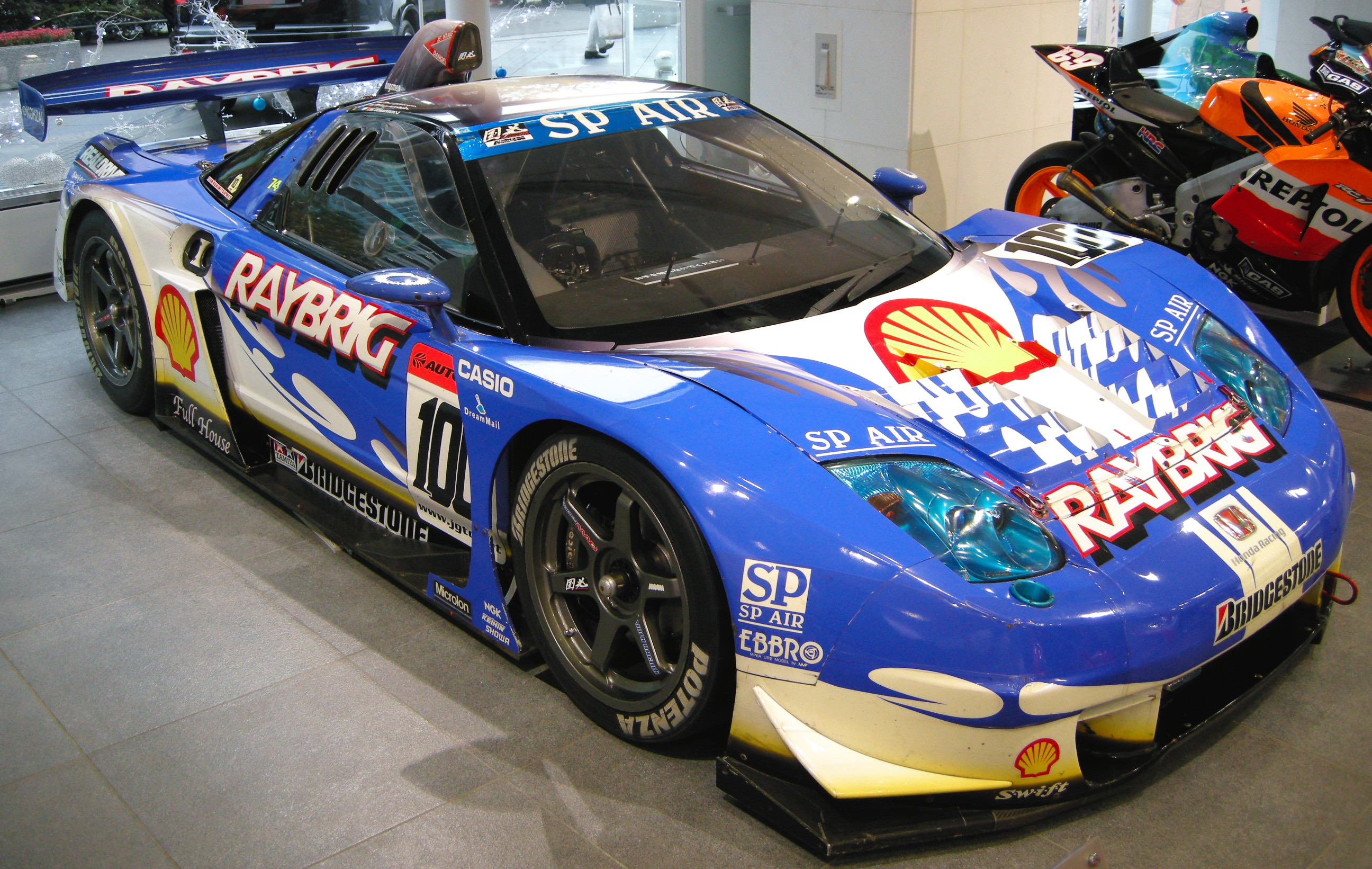
2004 Raybrig NSX-GT of Team Kunimitsu on display

After Takahashi's retirement from driving, the team were able to score a pole position in both the 2000 and 2001 seasons, but no podiums. In 2002, with Hidetoshi Mitsusada driving the full season, the team scored five top-five finishes, including a pair of second places, which yielded a fourth-place finish for Mitsusada in the drivers' championship. After limited success across 2003 and 2004, the team returned to the top step of the podium in 2005 as French duo Jérémie Dufour and Sébastien Philippe won at Motegi in the first year of the series being renamed as Super GT. With Dufour replaced by Shinya Hosokawa for 2006, the team was victorious at Motegi for the second consecutive year, and with two other podiums, finished runner-up in the drivers' championship. Dominik Schwager took over from Philippe for 2007, and in a season dominated by Honda, the team took three second places to claim third place in the drivers' championship, forming part of Honda's 1–2–3–4 finish in the championship. The following two seasons brought six top-five results, including a podium at Suzuka in 2008.

For the 2010 season, Honda introduced the new front-engined HSV-010 GT, and Team Kunimitsu had an all-new driver line-up consisting of rookie Naoki Yamamoto and Takuya Izawa. The pair finished on the podium on their debut race with the team; four more podiums followed until the end of 2012, and in the 2012 season they were the highest ranked Honda drivers in fifth. In 2013, the Dome Racing-bound Yamamoto was replaced by former champion Takashi Kogure, and in the opening race of season at Okayama, the team achieved their first win with the HSV-010.

In 2014, the team struggled in the debut season of the new mid-engined Honda NSX Concept-GT car, but a reunification of the Yamamoto-Izawa driver pairing for 2015 saw them finish third in the championship that year with a victory from Sugo. They fell outside the top ten in the 2016 standings, but scored one of Honda's three podium finishes that season, while in 2017 – now using the non-concept NSX-GT car – they finished seventh with two podiums, one of which came at the final running of the Suzuka 1000 km.

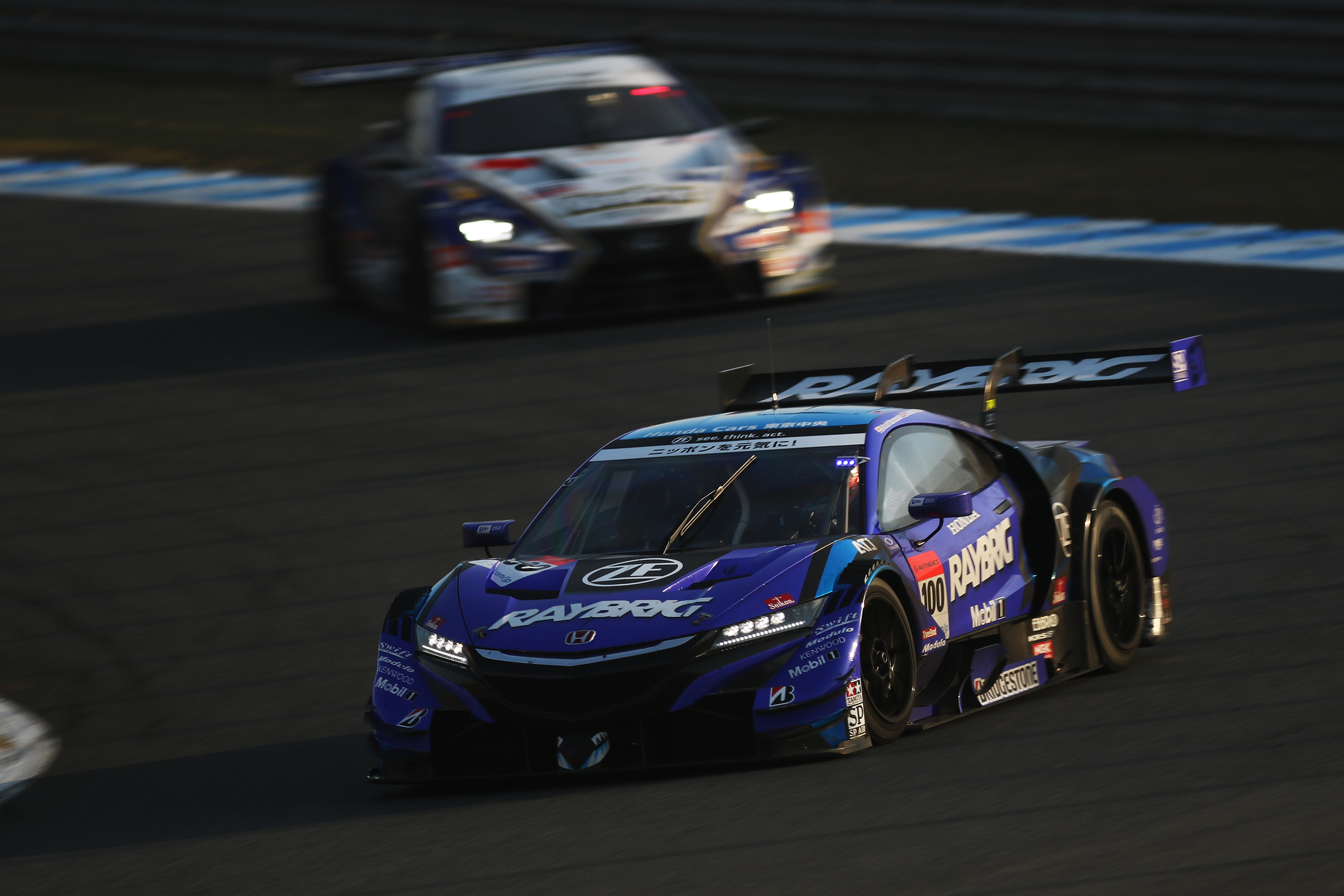
Team Kunimitsu won their first Super GT titles in 2018 with Naoki Yamamoto and Jenson Button.

The 2018 season saw 2009 Formula One World Champion Jenson Button make his full-season series debut at Team Kunimitsu alongside Yamamoto. The pair began the year with second-place finishes in the first and third rounds at Okayama and Suzuka, respectively, and later won the sixth round at Sugo from pole position to head into the season finale at Motegi tied on points for the championship lead with TOM'S duo Nick Cassidy and Ryo Hirakawa. In the final race, Button held off a late-race charge from Hirakawa for third place to clinch the first-ever championship titles for Team Kunimitsu.

In 2019, Yamamoto and Button finished eighth in an incident-filled season that yielded two podium finishes from the two Fuji races. The year also saw Team Kunimitsu participate in the final round of the DTM season at Hockenheim in Germany as Honda's guest entry; Button finished ninth in Race 1, which was the best result of the Super GT entries during the weekend. In the non-championship Super GT x DTM Dream Race, Yamamoto finished on the podium in the first race. Button left Super GT after the season to reduce frequent flying between countries.

For the 2020 season, Formula 2 race winner Tadasuke Makino joined the team as Yamamoto's co-driver. Driving the new front-engined NSX-GT car, the duo finished in the top-six in six of the first seven races, scoring podiums at Suzuka and Motegi, to enter the final round at Fuji two points off the lead of the championship. They qualified seventh for the final round, but made ground during the race, with Yamamoto having closed to within a few seconds of long-time race leader and title rival Ryo Hirakawa of TOM'S in the closing stages. On the final corner of the final lap, Hirakawa ran out of fuel, allowing Yamamoto to pass him for the race win and the championship. This was the final race for title sponsor Raybrig, as the brand would be defunct in the beginning of the following year.

Stanley Electric, the parent company of Raybrig, became the team's new title sponsor for 2021. The season saw Yamamoto and Makino win the third round at Motegi, after which Yamamoto established a championship lead as high as 16 points before the penultimate round (Makino missed the first round due to meningitis). They were in position to win the titles again at the final race, but Yamamoto was taken out in an incident caused by GT300 class driver Ren Sato with 15 laps remaining, and they ended up third in the standings.

== Racing results ==
=== Complete JGTC results ===
(key) (Races in bold indicate pole position) (Races in italics indicate fastest lap)

Year	Car	Tyres	Class	No.	Drivers	1	2	3	4	5	6	7	8	Pos	Pts
1994	Porsche 911 RSR	Y	GT1	100	(Japan) Kunimitsu Takahashi (Japan) Keiichi Tsuchiya	FUJ	SEN	FUJ; Ret	SUG; 1	MIN; 2				5th	35
1995	Porsche 964	Y	GT1	99	(Japan) Ryo Michigami	SUZ	FUJ	SEN	FUJ; 14	SUG; 12	MIN; 8			7th	30
1995	Porsche 911 RSR-T	Y	GT1	100	(Japan) Kunimitsu Takahashi (Japan) Keiichi Tsuchiya	SUZ; 15	FUJ; 3	SEN; 4	FUJ; 8	SUG; 8	MIN; Ret			7th	30
1996	Honda NSX GT	Y	GT500	100	(Japan) Kunimitsu Takahashi (Japan) Keiichi Tsuchiya	SUZ; Ret	FUJ; 8	SEN; 12	FUJ; 7	SUG; 10	MIN; 11			10th	8
1997	Honda NSX	B	GT500	100	(Japan) Kunimitsu Takahashi (Japan) Akira Iida	SUZ	FUJ; Ret	SEN; 16	FUJ; 11	MIN; 2	**SUG**; 2			6th	30
1998	Honda NSX	B	GT500	100	(Japan) Kunimitsu Takahashi (Japan) Akira Iida	**SUZ**; 10	FUJ; C	SEN; 12	**FUJ**; Ret	MOT; 7	**MIN**; 1	SUG; Ret		8th	25
1999	Honda NSX	B	GT500	100	(Japan) Kunimitsu Takahashi (Japan) Akira Iida	SUZ; Ret	FUJ; 1	SUG; 13	MIN; 15	FUJ; 7	OKA; 5	MOT; 9		6th	34
2000	Honda NSX	B	GT500	100	(Japan) Akira Iida (Japan) Naoki Hattori	MOT; Ret	FUJ; 14	SUG; 10	FUJ; 7	OKA; 5	MIN; Ret	**SUZ**; DSQ		11th	13
2001	Honda NSX	B	GT500	100	(Japan) Akira Iida (Japan) Daisuke Ito	OKA; 6	FUJ; 5	**SUG**; Ret	FUJ; 9	MOT; 4	SUZ; 13	MIN; 8		9th	29
2002	Honda NSX	B	GT500	100	(Japan) Hidetoshi Mitsusada (Japan) Hiroki Katoh (Japan) Toshihiro Kaneishi	OKA; 9	FUJ; 5	SUG; 2	SEP; 5	FUJ; 8	MOT; 2	MIN; Ret	SUZ; 4	6th	63
2003	Honda NSX	B	GT500	100	(Japan) Hidetoshi Mitsusada (Japan) Hiroki Katoh	OKA; 7	FUJ; 7	SUG; 16	FUJ; Ret	FUJ; 13	MOT; 5	AUT; 9	SUZ; 5	9th	27
2004	Honda NSX	B	GT500	100	(Japan) Shinji Nakano (Japan) Hiroki Katoh	OKA; NC	SUG; 8	SEP; 15	TOK; 10	MOT; 9	AUT; 10	SUZ; 9		11th	9

=== Complete Super GT results ===
(key) (Races in bold indicate pole position) (Races in italics indicate fastest lap)

Year	Car	Tyres	Class	No.	Drivers	1	2	3	4	5	6	7	8	9	Pos	Points
2005	Honda NSX	B	GT500	100	(France) Jérémie Dufour (France) Sébastien Philippe	OKA; 10	FUJ; 11	SEP; 10	SUG; Ret	MOT; 1	FUJ; 14	AUT; Ret	SUZ; Ret		10th	26
2006	Honda NSX	B	GT500	100	(Japan) Shinya Hosokawa (France) Sébastien Philippe	SUZ; 7	OKA; 2	FUJ; Ret	SEP; 4	SUG; 11	SUZ; 9	MOT; 1	AUT; 3	FUJ; 13	3rd	65
2007	Honda NSX	B	GT500	100	(Germany) Dominik Schwager (Japan) Shinya Hosokawa	SUZ; Ret	OKA; 2	FUJ; 5	SEP; 2	SUG; 12	SUZ; 4	MOT; Ret	AUT; 2	FUJ; 4	4th	81
2008	Honda NSX	B	GT500	100	(Japan) Yuji Ide (Japan) Shinya Hosokawa (Japan) Kosuke Matsuura	SUZ; 13	OKA; 9	FUJ; 4	SEP; 5	SUG; 5	SUZ; 2	MOT; 16	AUT; 9	FUJ; Ret	9th	60
2009	Honda NSX	B	GT500	100	(Japan) Yuji Ide (Japan) Shinya Hosokawa (Japan) Kosuke Matsuura	OKA; 8	SUZ; 12	FUJ; 11	SEP; 4	SUG; 4	SUZ; 9	FUJ; 12	AUT; 6	MOT; 8	12th	52
2010	Honda HSV-010 GT	B	GT500	100	(Japan) Takuya Izawa (Japan) Naoki Yamamoto	SUZ; 3	OKA; 8	FUJ; 10	SEP; 5	SUG; 8	SUZ; 3	FUJ; C	MOT; 6		7th	60
2011	Honda HSV-010 GT	B	GT500	100	(Japan) Takuya Izawa (Japan) Naoki Yamamoto	OKA; 2	FUJ; 12	SEP; 7	SUG; 7	SUZ; Ret	FUJ; 5	AUT; 14	MOT; 4		9th	56
2012	Honda HSV-010 GT	B	GT500	100	(Japan) Takuya Izawa (Japan) Naoki Yamamoto	OKA; 2	FUJ; 2	SEP; 6	SUG; 7	SUZ; 11	FUJ; 12	AUT; 8	MOT; 9		5th	64
2013	Honda HSV-010 GT	B	GT500	100	(Japan) Takuya Izawa (Japan) Takashi Kogure	OKA; 1	FUJ; 7	SEP; 3	SUG; 12	SUZ; 10	FUJ; Ret	AUT; 12	MOT; 12		10th	55
2014	Honda NSX-GT	B	GT500	100	(Japan) Takashi Kogure (Japan) Hideki Mutoh	OKA; 9	FUJ; Ret	AUT; 6	SUG; 11	FUJ; 7	SUZ; 6	BUR; 8	MOT; 8		11th	39
2015	Honda NSX-GT	B	GT500	100	(Japan) Takuya Izawa (Japan) Naoki Yamamoto	OKA; 2	FUJ; Ret	CHA; Ret	FUJ; 5	SUZ; 5	SUG; 1	AUT; 11	MOT; 3		3rd	76
2016	Honda NSX-GT	B	GT500	100	(Japan) Takuya Izawa (Japan) Naoki Yamamoto	OKA; 10	FUJ; Ret	SUG; 10	FUJ; 3	SUZ; 7	CHA; 10	MOT; 10	MOT; 12		12th	39
2017	Honda NSX-GT	B	GT500	100	(Japan) Takuya Izawa (Japan) Naoki Yamamoto	OKA; Ret	FUJ; 6	AUT; 3	SUG; 9	FUJ; 8	SUZ; 3	CHA; 7	MOT; 5		7th	63
2018	Honda NSX-GT	B	GT500	100	(United Kingdom) Jenson Button (Japan) Naoki Yamamoto	OKA; 2	FUJ; 9	SUZ; 2	CHA; 11	FUJ; 5	SUG; 1	AUT; 5	MOT; 3		1st	100
2019	Honda NSX-GT	B	GT500	1	(United Kingdom) Jenson Button (Japan) Naoki Yamamoto	OKA; 15	FUJ; 3	SUZ; 13	BUR; 12	FUJ; 2	AUT; Ret	SUG; 8	MOT; 6		9th	53
2020	Honda NSX-GT	B	GT500	100	(Japan) Tadasuke Makino (Japan) Naoki Yamamoto	FUJ; 6	FUJ; 5	SUZ; 3	MOT; 5	FUJ; 5	SUZ; Ret	MOT; 3	FUJ; 1		1st	90
2021	Honda NSX-GT	B	GT500	1	(Japan) Naoki Yamamoto (Japan) Hideki Mutoh (Japan) Tadasuke Makino	OKA; 8	FUJ; 4	MOT; 1	SUZ; 4	SUG; 2	AUT; 6	MOT; 12	FUJ; 14		3rd	81
2022	Honda NSX-GT	B	GT500	100	(Japan) Tadasuke Makino (Japan) Naoki Yamamoto	OKA; 2	FUJ; 5	SUZ; 9	FUJ; 8	SUZ; 11	SUG; 8	AUT; 2	MOT; 1		3rd	81.5
2023	Honda NSX-GT	B	GT500	100	(Japan) Tadasuke Makino (Japan) Naoki Yamamoto (Japan) Iori Kimura	OKA; 12	FUJ; 2	SUZ; 5	FUJ; 6	SUZ; 7	SUG; Ret	AUT; 9	MOT; 10		10th	53
2024	Honda Civic Type R-GT	B	GT500	100	(Japan) Tadasuke Makino (Japan) Naoki Yamamoto	OKA; 3	FUJ; 7	SUZ; 7	FUJ; 2	SUG; 5	AUT; 4	MOT; 6	SUZ; 4		2nd	85
2025	Honda Civic Type R-GT	B	GT500	100	(Japan) Tadasuke Makino (Japan) Naoki Yamamoto	OKA; 4	FUJ; 3	SEP; 6	FS1; 7	FS2; 12	SUZ; 10	SUG; 6	AUT; 1	MOT; 3	2nd	87
2026	Honda HRC Prelude-GT	B	GT500	100	(Japan) Naoki Yamamoto (Japan) Tadasuke Makino	OKA; 7	FUJ1; 8	FUJ2; 1	SUZ; 11	SUG; 3	AUT; 1	MOT1; 5	MOT2; **1**		1st	108

^{‡} Half points awarded as less than 75% of race distance was completed. * Season still in progress.
