= Stanley Electric =

Japanese lighting manufacturer

Stanley Electric Co., Ltd.

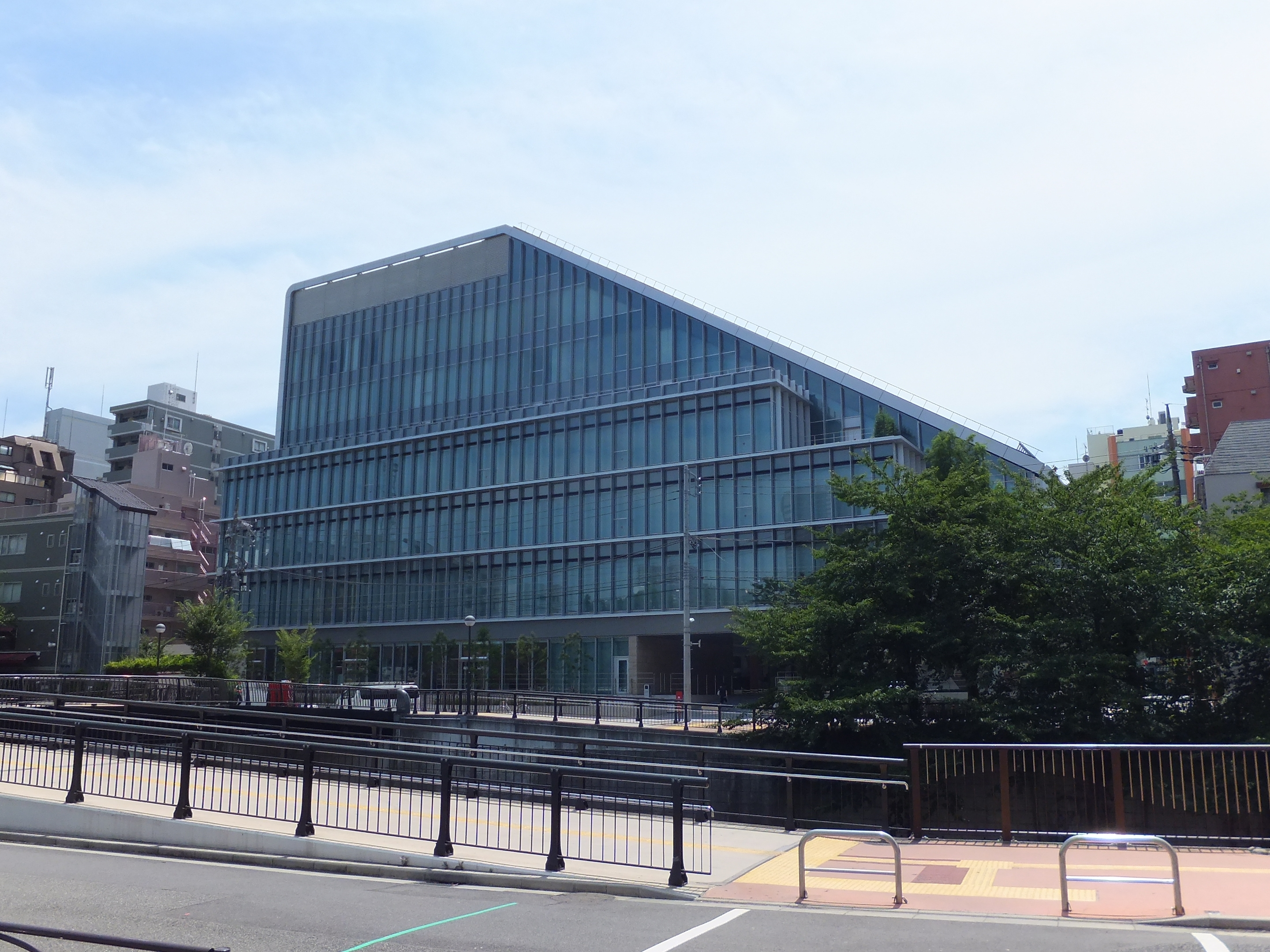
- Stanley Electric head office building
- Native name: スタンレー電気株式会社
- Type: Public (K.K)
- Traded as: TYO: 6923
- ISIN: JP3399400005
- Industry: Automotive
- Founded: December 29, 1920 (105 years ago)
- Founder: Takaharu Kitano
- Headquarters: Nakameguro, Meguro-ku, Tokyo 153-8636, Japan
- Area served: Worldwide
- Key people: Yasuaki Kaizumi (President)
- Products: Headlamps; LEDs; Electronic parts
Revenue
▲JPY 442.1 billion (FY 2017) (US$ 4.1 billion) (FY 2017)
- Net income: ▲JPY 36 billion (FY 2017) (US$ 338 million) (FY 2017)
- Number of employees: 16,687 (consolidated, as of March 31, 2018)
- Website: Official website

Stanley Electric Co., Ltd. (スタンレー電気株式会社; Sutanrē Denki Kabushiki-gaisha) is a Japanese manufacturer of electric lights. Stanley has 36 consolidated subsidiaries, three associated companies, 67 factories and offices in 18 countries, and over 16,000 employees.

The main customers for its core business, automotive lighting, are Honda and Nissan. Other customers using Stanley's products include Toyota, Mazda, Suzuki, Mitsubishi, Ford and Chrysler. Stanley is listed in the TOPIX of the Tokyo Stock Exchange.

== History ==
Initially Kitano Shokai (北野商会), the company was founded in 1920 by Takaharu Kitano. At the time, only about 8,000 cars were present in Japan, all of them imported.

In 1933, the company became incorporated as a kabushiki gaisha and was renamed after explorer Henry Morton Stanley, who was famous for exploring Africa. As the company states, Kitano was impressed by Stanley's vision, courage and pioneering spirit. A branch in Osaka was established the following year. From 1943 to 1949, the company was known as Kitano Denki Kogyo Co., Ltd. (北野電気工業株式会社; Kitano Denki Kōgyō Kabushiki-gaisha).

Stanley was first listed on the Tokyo Stock Exchange in 1961. The company established its first international branch in 1968 in Taiwan, followed by an American branch in 1979 and a French branch in 1984. Stanley founded a joint venture based in Melbourne in 2002 with the German company Hella.

== Operations ==
Stanley's products include HID and LED headlights. Stanley developed the world's first LED high-mount stop lamp.

Stanley also produces all types of automotive lighting, backlighted LED displays, camera flashes, automotive interior displays, sensors, light fixtures and streetlights, as used in Shanghai and Tokyo.

In 2013, Stanley announced plans to concentrate more on the development of LED headlights and planned to raise the LED share from 1% to 20% by 2017.

=== Research and development ===
Stanley conducts research and development at 5 research centres in Japan, where new light technologies are explored, existing technologies are optimized, and new products are developed. One such research centre is located in Tsukuba. Research results are regularly published in scientific journals.

=== Motorsport ===
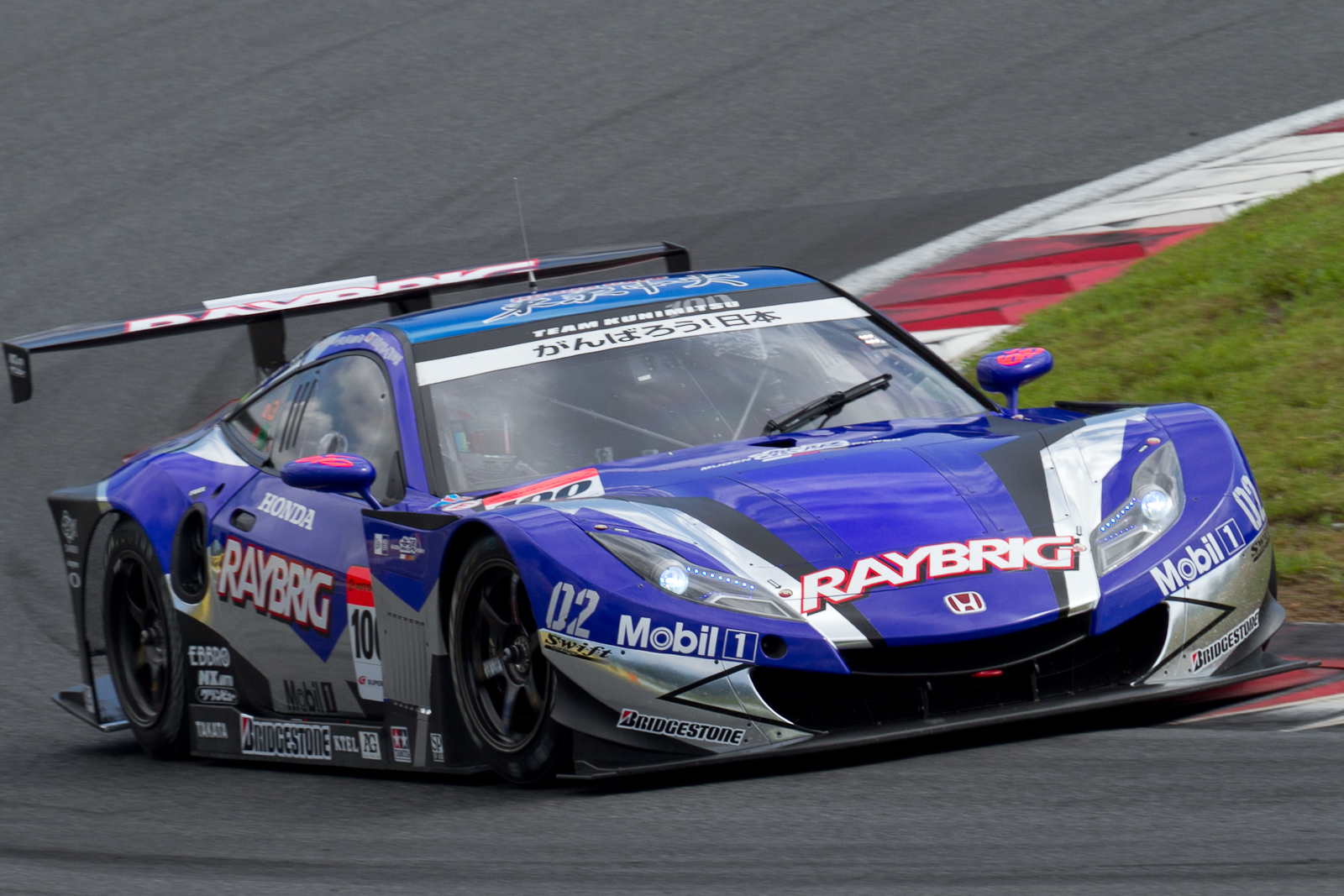
Takuya Izawa (Team Kunimitsu) in a Raybrig-sponsored Honda HSV-010 GT in 2011

Until March 2021, Stanley sold aftermarket products under the motorsport-inspired Raybrig brand, which also sponsored Team Kunimitsu in Super GT. After Team Kunimitsu won the 2020 GT500 Championship, bringing an end to a 25-year sponsorship, Stanley itself replaced Raybrig as the team's main sponsor for 2021.

=== Social involvement ===
Founder Takaharu Kitano also established the Kitano Foundation of Lifelong Integrated Education in 1975, which awards scholarships to those who can not afford education. The foundation is active in Japan, China, Vietnam, the Philippines, India and other countries.

Stanley is also the title sponsor of the Stanley Ladies Golf Tournament, a women's golf series managed by the LPGA that also funds the construction of schools in Kenya.

=== Event sponsorship ===
Stanley takes part in illumination events worldwide. At festivities marking 150 years of Japanese-German friendship, the Brandenburg Gate in Berlin was illuminated with LED flood lights in 2011. Stanley LED lights were installed outside the Kabuki-za in Ginza before its reopening in 2013. Both lighting arrangements were conducted in cooperation with lighting artist Makoto Ishii.
