= Kakunoshin Ohta =

Japanese racing driver (born 1999)

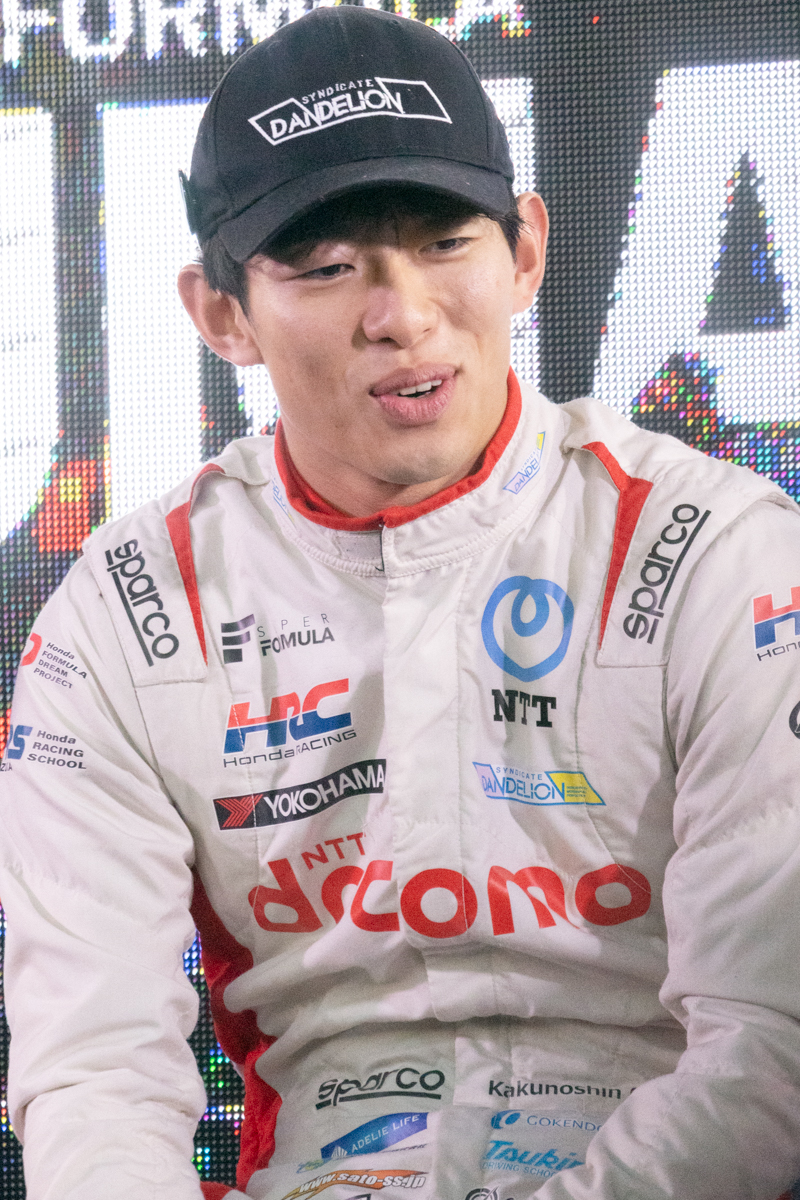
- Ohta at Suzuka Circuit in November 2024
- Nationality: (Japan) Japanese
- Born: 16 June 1999 (age 27) Shimogyō-ku, Kyoto, Japan

Super Formula career
- Debut season: 2023
- Current team: Dandelion Racing
- Categorisation: FIA Gold
- Car number: 6
- Starts: 30
- Wins: 6
- Podiums: 8
- Poles: 1
- Fastest laps: 1
- Best finish: 3rd in 2025

Super GT - GT500 career
- Debut season: 2023
- Current team: ARTA
- Car number: 8
- Former teams: Nakajima Racing, Real Racing
- Starts: 16
- Wins: 0
- Podiums: 3
- Poles: 0
- Fastest laps: 0
- Best finish: 14th in 2023

Previous series
- 2022 2022 2021-22 2019 2018-21: Super GT - GT300; Super Formula Lights; Super Taikyū; French F4 Championship; F4 Japanese Championship

Championship titles
- 2022: Super Taikyū - ST-Z

Kakunoshin Ohta (Japanese: 太田 格之進, Hepburn: Ōta Kakunoshin; born 22 June 1999) is a Japanese racing driver for Honda Motor Company who currently competes in Super GT for Team HRC ARTA Mugen and in Super Formula for docomo Team Dandelion Racing and the IMSA SportsCar Championship for Acura Meyer Shank Racing in the GTP class.

== Career ==
=== Early career ===
Ohta made his single-seater racing debut in 2018, racing at a single round of the F4 Japanese Championship with MYST. The following season, he made his full-time debut in the 2019 championship with backing from the Honda Formula Dream Project, claiming 2 wins but finishing 6th in the standings. That year, Ohta also made a guest appearance in the French F4 championship alongside Honda stablemate Ren Satō, where he finished in the top ten in the three races he competed in and secured one podium. He would also make an appearance in Japan Formula 4 at the end of the year, winning the "All-Japan Deciding Race" over the likes of Satō, Atsushi Miyake, and Riki Ōkusa.

In 2020, Ohta returned to the F4 Japanese Championship, albeit having lost his manufacturer backing. He regained support from Honda and rejoined the Honda Formula Dream project for 2021 to contest his third season in the championship, eventually finishing fifth in the standings.

Ohta stepped up to Super Formula Lights for the 2022 season, driving for Toda Racing. Belying his past record, he impressed immediately, claiming four wins and twelve podiums to finish second in the championship, behind only the returning Kazuto Kotaka.

=== Super GT ===
==== GT300 ====
Ohta began his Super GT career in GT300 with Team UpGarage, paired with veteran driver Takashi Kobayashi. Ohta claimed his maiden podium on debut at the first round in Okayama, and would go on to finish on the podium once more to end the season eighth in the standings.

==== GT500 ====
For the 2023 season, Ohta was promoted to the GT500 class, driving for Modulo Nakajima Racing alongside series veteran Takuya Izawa. After a promising season, Ohta moved to Real Racing as he replaced Nobuharu Matsushita, and raced along with Koudai Tsukakoshi.

=== Super Formula ===
==== 2023 ====
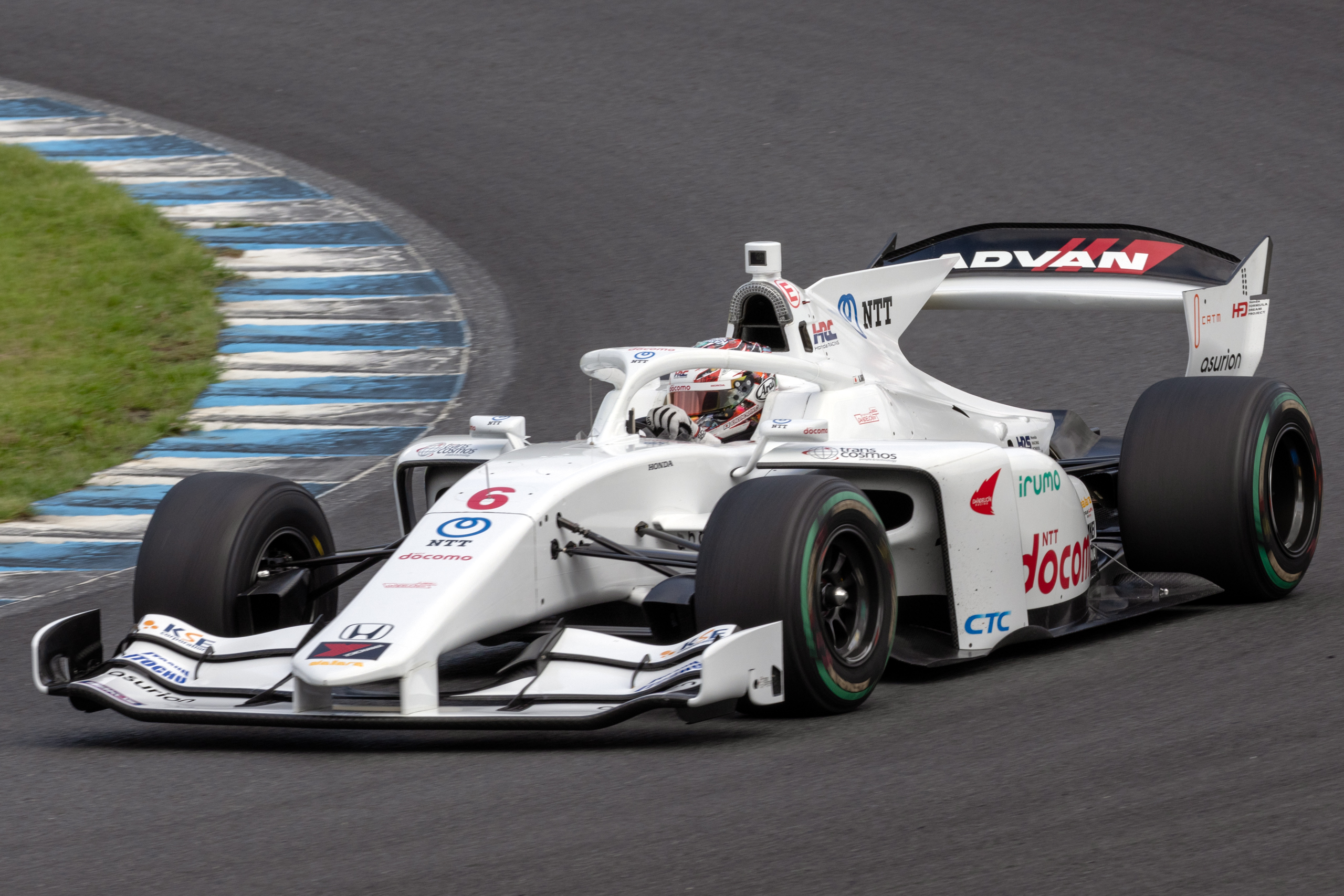
Ohta at Mobility Resort Motegi in 2024

Following his performance in Super Formula Lights, Ohta was promoted to a top-level drive in the Super Formula Championship for 2023, racing for docomo Dandelion Racing alongside Tadasuke Makino and in place of Hiroki Ōtsu. Ohta struggled during the first half of the season but proved to be a revalation following the summer break, qualifying in the top ten for the first time at the fifth round at Sportsland SUGO and proceeding to qualify in the top four in each of the season's four remaining rounds. He claimed his first podium in the championship in a shortened penultimate round at Suzuka, and followed it up by fending off the challenge of heavily favored championship contender Liam Lawson and eventual series champion Ritomo Miyata to claim his first race victory in the season finale.

==== 2024 ====
Ohta returned to Dandelion in 2024. He began the year by finishing fourth at Suzuka, where he qualified second before dropping multiple places owing to a poor start. Ohta finished fifth at Autopolis preceded a non-score at SUGO, as he went off at the final corner during a restart in wet conditions. He failed to start the next race at Fuji before experiencing a strong run at Motegi, qualifying second and progressing to the lead thanks to an undercut strategy. However, he was chased down by teammate Makino in the closing stages and lost the victory on the penultimate lap, as a throttle issue caused him to spin out of the race. Ohta had another strong qualifying session in Fuji, as he started from second, but dropped to ninth by the flag due to degrading tyres in the final laps. He finished the second race of the weekend in fourth. At the final event in Suzuka, Ohta qualified on pole for race 1 before cruising to a dominant victory. Starting from second the following day, he took the lead at turn one and later defended against Sho Tsuboi right after the pit stop phase to clinch his second successive victory. He ended the year fourth in the standings.

==== 2025 ====
Ohta continued to stay with Dandelion Racing for 2025 season.

=== Endurance racing ===
Ohta was given a chance to test the Acura ARX-06 in the IMSA Sanctioned Test at Daytona International Speedway in November 2024.

On 11 December 2024, it was announced that Ohta would be driving three races during the 2025 IMSA SportsCar Championship in the 93 Acura Meyer Shank Racing Acura ARX-06, alongside Renger van Der Zande and Nick Yelloly, for the Rolex 24 Hours at Daytona, Six Hours of the Glen at Watkins Glen and the Battle of the Bricks at Indianapolis Motor Speedway, and Alex Palou for the Rolex 24 exclusively.

== Karting record ==
=== Karting career summary ===
Season	Series	Team	Position
2013	IAME International Final — X30 Junior	Super Winforce RT	NC
2014	CIK-FIA Karting Academy Trophy — Academy	Ota Masatoshi	2nd
2014	IAME International Final — X30 Junior		34th
2015	Asia Pacific Championship — KF	Toyota Yamaha RT	17th

== Racing record ==
=== Racing career summary ===
Season	Series	Team	Races	Wins	Poles	F/Laps	Podiums	Points	Position
2018	JAF Formula 4 - West Series	MARUSAN MYST	5	4	5	4	4	80	**2nd**
2018	JAF Formula 4 - East Series	MARUSAN MYST	3	0	0	0	1	45	5th
2018	F4 Japanese Championship	MARUSAN MYST	2	0	0	0	0	0	47th
2018	JAF F4 – All-Japan Final	MARUSAN MYST	1	1	1	1	1	N/A	**1st**
2019	F4 Japanese Championship	Honda Formula Dream Project	14	2	3	2	4	125	6th
2019	French F4 Championship	FFSA Academy	3	0	0	0	1	0	NC†
2019	JAF Formula 4 Championship	Takamiya Syouji MARUSAN MYST	2	2	2	1	2	40	7th
2019	JAF F4 - All-Japan Final	Takamiya Syouji MARUSAN MYST	1	1	1	1	1	N/A	**1st**
2020	F4 Japanese Championship	Vegaplus	9	0	0	1	2	68	7th
2020	JAF Formula 4 Championship	MYST	1	1	0	1	1	20	10th
2021	F4 Japanese Championship	Honda Formula Dream Project	14	0	0	1	6	150	5th
2021	Formula Regional Japanese Championship	Rn-sports	2	0	0	0	1	27	14th
2021	Super Taikyu - ST-Z	Team 5Zigen	4	0	0	0	2	80.5‡	**3rd‡**
2022	Super Formula Lights	Toda Racing	18	4	6	7	12	108	**2nd**
2022	Super GT - GT300	Team UpGarage	8	0	0	0	2	34	8th
2022	Super Taikyu - ST-Z	Team 5Zigen	6	2	3	3	4	131.5‡	**1st‡**
2023	Super Formula	docomo Team Dandelion Racing	9	1	0	0	2	35.5	7th
2023	Super GT - GT500	Modulo Nakajima Racing	8	0	0	0	1	19	14th
2024	Super Formula	docomo Team Dandelion Racing	8	2	1	1	2	75	4th
2024	Super GT - GT500	Astemo Real Racing	8	0	1	0	2	43	10th
2024	Super Taikyu - ST-X	Craft-Bamboo Racing	5	2	2	0	0	110‡	**2nd‡**
2025	Super Formula	docomo Team Dandelion Racing	12	3	0	0	6	118	**3rd**
2025	IMSA SportsCar Championship - GTP	Acura Meyer Shank Racing with Curb-Agajanian	3	0	1	0	0	833	20th
2025	IMSA SportsCar Championship - LMP2	Era Motorsport	2	0	0	0	0	501	39th
2025	Intercontinental GT Challenge	Mercedes-AMG Team Craft-Bamboo Racing	1	0	0	0	0	2	31st
2025	Super Taikyu - ST-X	Craft-Bamboo Racing	4	0	0	0	0	38.5‡	6th‡
2026	Super Formula	docomo Team Dandelion Racing							
2026	Super GT - GT500	Team HRC ARTA Mugen	8	0	1	0	3	49	6th
2026	IMSA SportsCar Championship - GTP	Acura Meyer Shank Racing with Curb-Agajanian	2	0	1	0	1	643	25th
2026	Super Taikyu - ST-X	Craft-Bamboo Racing	5	2	2	2	3	113‡	**3rd‡**
2026	Intercontinental GT Challenge	Mercedes-AMG Team Craft-Bamboo Racing	1	0	0	0	0	10	25th
2026	24 Hours of Le Mans - LMP2	Proton Competition	1	0	0	0	0	N/A	8th

† As he was a guest driver, Ohta was ineligible to score points.
^{*} Season still in progress. ‡ Team standings.

=== Complete F4 Japanese Championship results ===
Year	Team	1	2	3	4	5	6	7	8	9	10	11	12	13	14	DC	Points
2018	MYST	OKA; 1	OKA; 2	FUJ1; 1	FUJ1; 2	SUZ; 1	SUZ; 2	FUJ2; 1; 27	FUJ2; 2 Ret	SUG; 1	SUG; 2	AUT; 1	AUT; 2	MOT; 1	MOT; 2	47th	0
2019	Honda Formula Dream Project	OKA; 1 Ret	**OKA**; **2** Ret	FUJ1; 1; 2	FUJ1; 2; 5	**SUZ**; **1**; 1	**SUZ**; **2**; 1	FUJ2; 1; 4	FUJ2; 2; 9	AUT; 1; 3	AUT; 2; 6	SUG; 1; 18	SUG; 2; 27	MOT; 1; 8	MOT; 2; 7	6th	125
2020	Vegaplus	FUJ1; 1	FUJ1; 2	FUJ1; 3	SUZ; 1; 5	SUZ; 2; 2	SUZ; 3; 3	MOT; 1; 6	MOT; 2; 9	MOT; 3; 8	FUJ2; 1; 9	FUJ2; 2; 7	FUJ2; 3; 4			7th	68
2021	Honda Formula Dream Project	FUJ1; 1; 4	FUJ1; 2; 31	SUZ; 1; 2	SUZ; 2; 2	MOT1; 1; 3	MOT1; 2; 5	MOT1; 3; 2	SUG; 1; 8	SUG; 2; 9	SUG; 3; 6	MOT2; 1; 3	MOT2; 2; 2	FUJ2; 1 Ret	FUJ2; 2; 4	5th	150

=== Complete Formula Regional Japanese Championship Results ===
(key) (Races in bold indicate pole position) (Races in italics indicate fastest lap)

Year	Team	1	2	3	4	5	6	7	8	9	10	11	12	13	Rank	Points
2021	Rn-sports	OKA; 1	OKA; 2	OKA; 3	MOT; 1	MOT; 2	MOT; 3	FUJ; 1	FUJ; 2	FUJ; 3	SUG; 1; 4	SUG; 2; 3	SUZ; 1	SUZ; 2	14th	27

=== Complete Super Formula Lights results ===
(key) (Races in bold indicate pole position) (Races in italics indicate fastest lap)

Year	Team	1	2	3	4	5	6	7	8	9	10	11	12	13	14	15	16	17	18	Pos	Points
2022	Toda Racing	FUJ; 1 Ret	FUJ; 2; 2	FUJ; 3; 4	SUZ; 1; 2	**SUZ**; **2**; 1	SUZ; 3; 2	**AUT**; **1**; 2	**AUT**; **2**; 1	AUT; 3; 2	**SUG**; **1** Ret	SUG; 2; 3	SUG; 3; 5	MOT; 1; 2	**MOT**; **2**; 9	MOT; 3; 4	**OKA**; **1**; 1	OKA; 2; 3	OKA; 3; 1	2nd	113

=== Complete Super GT results ===
Year	Team	Car	Class	1	2	3	4	5	6	7	8	DC	Pts
2022	Team UpGarage	Honda NSX GT3 Evo	GT300	OKA; 2	FUJ; 13	SUZ; Ret	FUJ; 3	SUZ; 14	SUG; 11	AUT; 19	MOT; 4	8th	34
2023	Modulo Nakajima Racing	Honda NSX-GT	GT500	OKA; 10	FUJ; 14	SUZ; 14	FUJ; 2	SUZ; 8	SUG; 11	AUT; 11	MOT; Ret	14th	19
2024	Astemo Real Racing	Honda Civic Type R-GT	GT500	OKA; Ret	**FUJ**; 3^{1}	SUZ; 6	FUJ; 8	SUZ; 7	SUG; Ret	AUT; 14†	MOT; 2^{2}	10th	43
2026	Team HRC ARTA Mugen	Honda Prelude-GT	GT500	OKA; 11	FUJ; 11	**FUJ**; 2	SUZ; 3	SUG; 9	AUT; 6	MOT; 3	MOT; 7	6th	49

=== Complete Super Formula results ===
(key) (Races in bold indicate pole position; races in italics indicate fastest lap)

Year	Team	Engine	1	2	3	4	5	6	7	8	9	10	11	12	DC	Points
2023	docomo Team Dandelion Racing	Honda	FUJ; 15	FUJ; 19	SUZ; 17	AUT; 16	SUG; 15	FUJ; 6^{3}	MOT; Ret^{2}	SUZ; 3	SUZ; 1^{2}				7th	35.5
2024	docomo Team Dandelion Racing	Honda	SUZ; 4^{2}	AUT; 5	SUG; 14	FUJ; DNS	MOT; 19†^{2}	FUJ; 9^{2}	FUJ; 4	**SUZ**; 1^{1}	SUZ; 1^{2}				4th	75
2025	docomo Team Dandelion Racing	Honda	SUZ; 1^{3}	SUZ; 12^{3}	MOT; 2^{2}	MOT; 1^{2}	AUT; 13	FUJ; 10	FUJ; 1^{2}	SUG; 8	FUJ; 7‡	SUZ; 5^{3}	SUZ; 3	SUZ; 3	3rd	118
2026	docomo Team Dandelion Racing	Honda	MOT	MOT	AUT	SUZ	SUZ	FUJ	FUJ	SUG	FUJ	FUJ	SUZ	SUZ		

^{‡} Half points awarded as less than 75% of race distance was completed.
^{*} Season still in progress.

=== Complete IMSA SportsCar Championship results ===
(key) (Races in bold indicate pole position; races in italics indicate fastest lap)

Year	Entrant	Class	Make	Engine	1	2	3	4	5	6	7	8	9	Rank	Points
2025	Acura Meyer Shank Racing with Curb-Agajanian	GTP	Acura ARX-06	Honda AR24e 2.4 L Turbo V6	DAY; 8		LBH	LGA	DET	**WGL**; 6		IMS; 5	PET	16th*	833*
2025	Era Motorsport	LMP2	Oreca 07	Gibson GK428 4.2 L V8		SEB; 12					ELK; 5			36th*	501*
2026	Acura Meyer Shank Racing w/ Curb-Agajanian	GTP	Acura ARX-06	Honda AR24e 2.4 L Turbo V6	**DAY**; 5	SEB	LBH	LGA	DET	WGL; 2	ELK	IMS	PET	25th	643

^{*} Season still in progress.

=== Complete 24 Hours of Le Mans results ===
Year	Team	Co-Drivers	Car	Class	Laps	Pos.	Class Pos.
2026	(Germany) Proton Competition	(United Kingdom) Harry King (Germany) Jonas Ried	Oreca 07-Gibson	LMP2	356	25th	8th
