= Ponos (disambiguation) =

Ponos is the Greek personification of toil and stress.

Ponos may also refer to:

== Surname ==
- Zdravko Ponoš, a Serbian politician, former diplomat, and retired general

== Music ==
- Ponos i laž , an album by Aca Lukas

== Other uses ==
- Ponos (company), a Japanese gaming company
- Ponos Racing, a Japanese gaming company motor racing team owned by Ponos (company)
