= 2025 Super Formula Championship =

Japanese open-wheel motor racing event

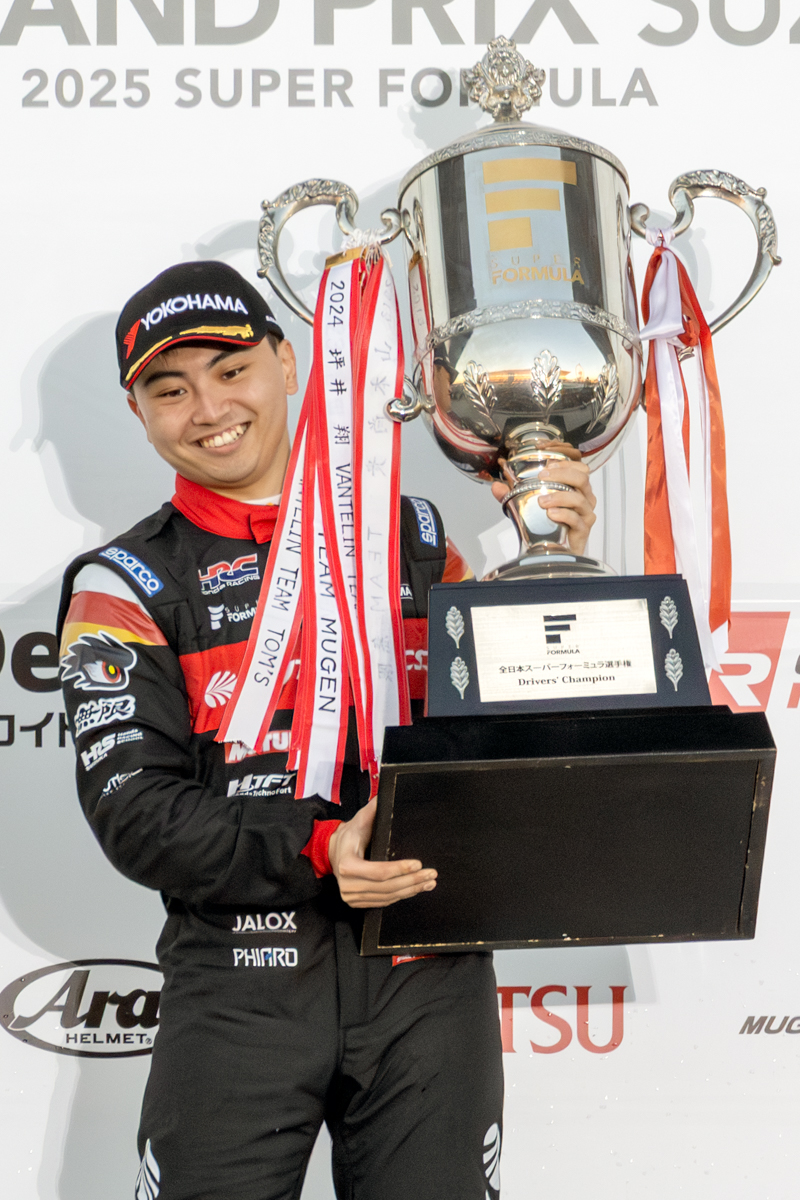
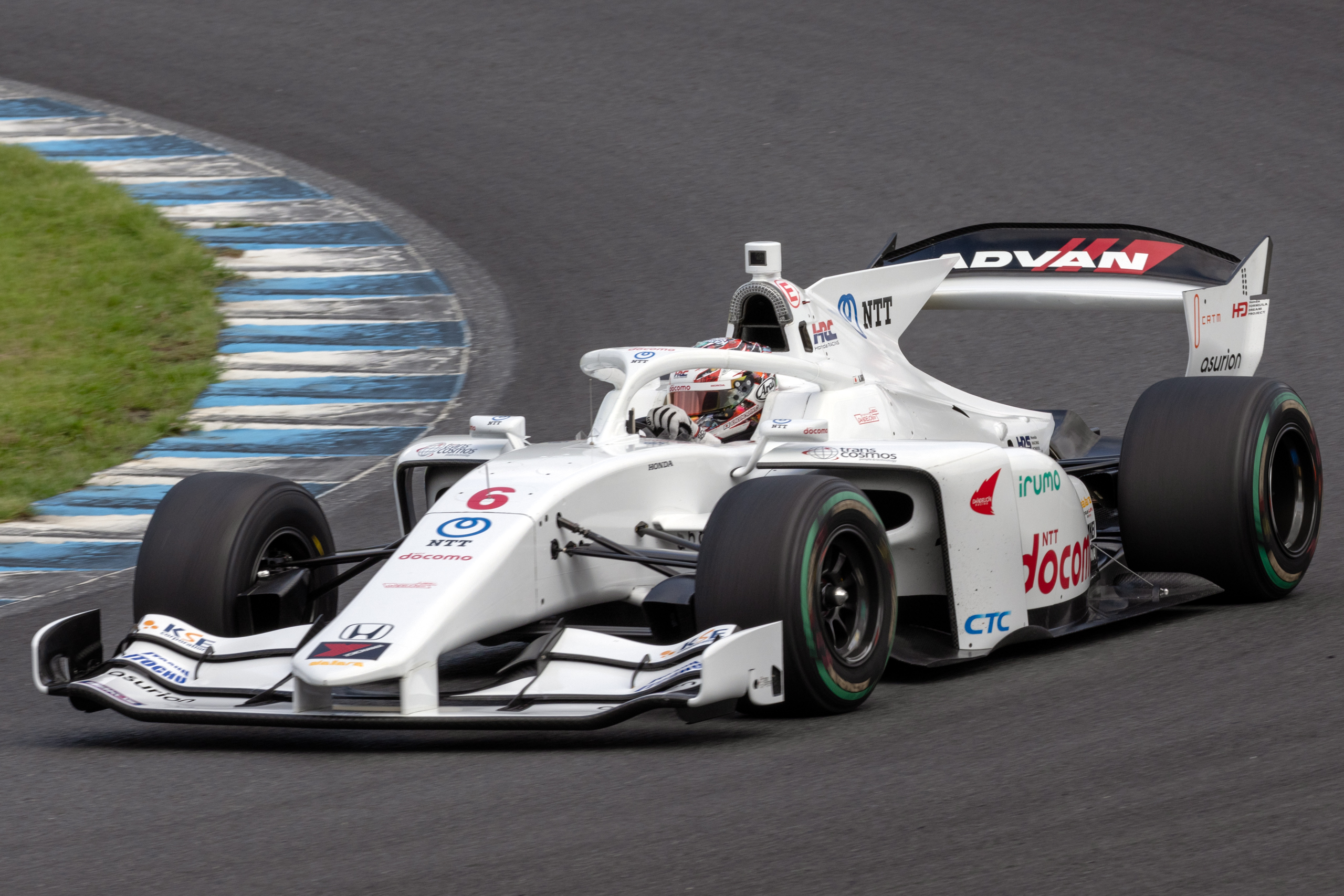
Ayumu Iwasa (left) and Dandelion Racing (right) won the Drivers' and Teams' Championships, respectively.

The 2025 Japanese Super Formula Championship was the fifty-third season of premier Japanese open-wheel motor racing, and the thirteenth under the moniker of Super Formula. The season started in March at Suzuka Circuit and was contested over 12 rounds in seven race weekends, ending in November at Suzuka.

Ayumu Iwasa, driving for Team Mugen, won his first Super Formula Drivers' Championship at the final race, ahead of defending champion Sho Tsuboi. Dandelion Racing won the Teams' Championship for the second time in a row.

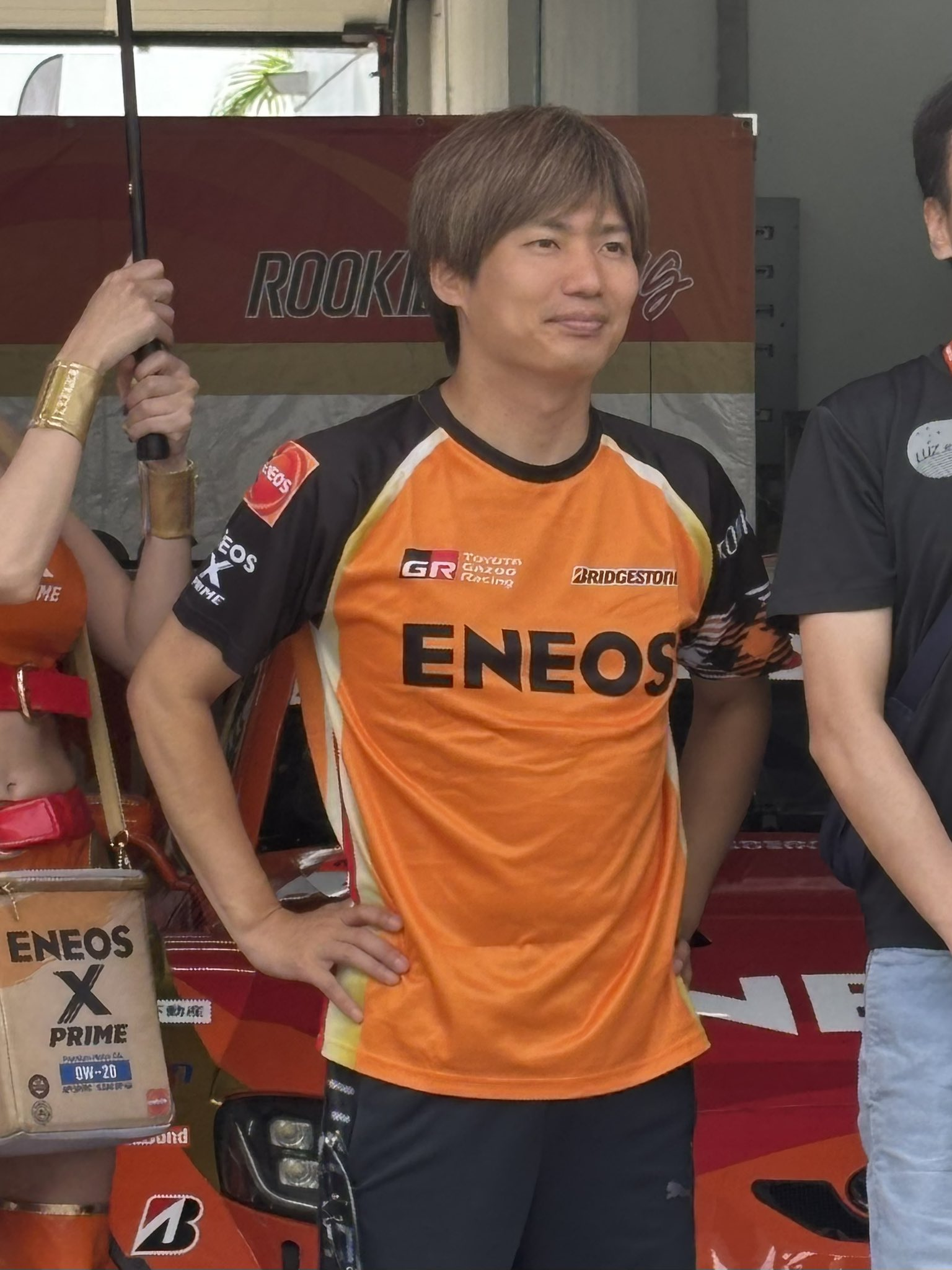
The 2025 Super Formula Championship was the last season for Kazuya Oshima, as after its conclusion, he ended his career after 13 seasons.

== Teams and drivers ==
All teams used identical Dallara-built SF23 chassis with either Honda or Toyota engines. Every Honda-powered car used a Honda HR-417E engine and every Toyota-powered car used a Toyota TRD-01F engine. All teams competed with tyres supplied by Yokohama.

Entrant	Engine	No.	Driver name	Rounds	Ref.
(Japan) Vantelin Team TOM'S	Toyota	1	(Japan) Sho Tsuboi	All	
(Japan) Vantelin Team TOM'S	Toyota	37	(Argentina) Sacha Fenestraz	All	
(Japan) Kondo Racing	Toyota	3	(Japan) Kenta Yamashita	All	
(Japan) Kondo Racing	Toyota	4	(United Kingdom) Zak O'Sullivan	All	
(Japan) Docomo Team Dandelion Racing	Honda	5	(Japan) Tadasuke Makino	All	
(Japan) Docomo Team Dandelion Racing	Honda	6	(Japan) Kakunoshin Ohta	All	
(Hong Kong) Kids com Team KCMG	Toyota	7	(Japan) Kamui Kobayashi	1–2, 5–12	
(Hong Kong) Kids com Team KCMG	Toyota	7	(Japan) Seita Nonaka	3–4	
(Hong Kong) Kids com Team KCMG	Toyota	8	(Japan) Nirei Fukuzumi	All	
(Japan) Hazama Ando Triple Tree Racing	Honda	10	(Japan) "Juju"	All	
(Japan) ThreeBond Racing	Honda	12	(Japan) Atsushi Miyake	All	
(Japan) docomo business Rookie	Toyota	14	(Japan) Kazuya Oshima	All	
(Japan) Team Mugen	Honda	15	(Japan) Ayumu Iwasa	All	
(Japan) Team Mugen	Honda	16	(Japan) Tomoki Nojiri	All	
(Japan) Itochu Enex Wecars Team Impul	Toyota	19	(Denmark) Oliver Rasmussen	1–2, 5–12 (Note: Oliver Rasmussen entered the first double-header at Suzuka, but withdrew ahead of the first qualifying session after sustaining an injury in free practice. He was replaced by Seita Nonaka.)	
(Japan) Itochu Enex Wecars Team Impul	Toyota	19	(Japan) Seita Nonaka	1–2	
(Japan) Itochu Enex Wecars Team Impul	Toyota	19	(Japan) Rikuto Kobayashi	3–4	
(Japan) Itochu Enex Wecars Team Impul	Toyota	20	(Japan) Mitsunori Takaboshi	All	
(Japan) KDDI TGMGP TGR-DC	Toyota	28	(Japan) Kazuto Kotaka	All	
(Japan) KDDI TGMGP TGR-DC	Toyota	29	(Japan) Hibiki Taira	1–5	
(Japan) KDDI TGMGP TGR-DC	Toyota	29	(Japan) Seita Nonaka	6–12	
(Japan) Sanki Vertex Partners Cerumo・Inging	Toyota	38	(Japan) Sena Sakaguchi	All	
(Japan) Sanki Vertex Partners Cerumo・Inging	Toyota	39	(Japan) Toshiki Oyu	All	
(Japan) San-Ei Gen with B-Max	Honda	50	(Japan) Syun Koide	All	
(Japan) Ponos Nakajima Racing	Honda	64	(Japan) Ren Sato	All	
(Japan) Ponos Nakajima Racing	Honda	65	(Brazil) Igor Omura Fraga	All	

=== Team changes ===
- The entry co-run by Inging Motorsport and Cerumo added another title sponsor alongside Vertex Partners, with Industrial manufacturer Sanki Shokai joining the series and the team competing under the name Sanki Vertex Partners Cerumo・Inging.
- TGM Grand Prix underwent substantial changes within its organization. The team ended its engine contract with Honda and instead became part of Toyota Gazoo Racing, joining Rookie Racing in serving as a Toyota junior team and receiving Toyota engines. The team, co-run by TGM and TOM'S, acquired a new title sponsor in telecommunications operator KDDI and entered the 2025 season under the name KDDI TGMGP TGR-DC.
- A new team entered the championship in Triple Tree Racing, established by Hideki Noda, former Formula One and father of Juju Noda. It used Honda engines and was operated by motorsport management company 4Minutes. Construction company Hazama Ando was confirmed to be the entry's title sponsor, with the team running under the name Hazama Ando Triple Tree Racing.
- Red Bull ended their partnership with Team Mugen after seven years of cooperation.
- Team Impul added another title sponsor in Itochu's subsidiary company, used car dealer Wecars, with the team competing under the name Itochu Enex Wecars Team Impul.

=== Driver changes ===
- Nakajima Racing saw three-time series champion Naoki Yamamoto retire from the series after 15 seasons. The team promoted their reserve driver Igor Fraga, who spent 2024 competing in Super GT's GT300 class with Anest Iwata Racing with Arnage, to its Super Formula outfit.
- Team Impul had an all-new line up as 2016 series champion Yuji Kunimoto retired from the series after 14 seasons and neither of the four drivers who drove the No. 19 car in 2024 returned. The team signed Oliver Rasmussen, who came 19th in the WEC's Hypercar class with Jota Sport in 2024 and made his series debut, and NISMO works driver Mitsunori Takaboshi, who made his full-season debut after a one-off Super Formula appearance for Team Impul in 2021.
- B-Max Racing Team saw Iori Kimura leave the team after Honda ended its association with him. He joined Team Mach in the Super GT GT300 class, while B-Max promoted reigning Super Formula Lights champion Syun Koide from its outfit in that championship to replace him.
- TOM'S saw Ukyo Sasahara leave the series after five years and three full-time seasons to focus on his Super GT GT500 efforts with TGR Team Deloitte TOM'S. 2022 Super Formula runner-up Sacha Fenestraz returned to the series after a two-year stint in Formula E with Nissan to replace him.
- Kondo Racing replaced TGMGP-bound Kazuto Kotaka with former Williams Academy driver Zak O'Sullivan, who moved to Japan after coming 16th in Formula 2 with ART Grand Prix.
- Newly rebranded team TGMGP also took on two new drivers as Juju Noda and Hiroki Otsu both left the team following its switch from Honda to Toyota engines, with Noda switching to the new Triple Tree Racing team and Otsu electing to focus on his Super GT GT500 efforts with ARTA. Kazuto Kotaka joined the team after coming 14th with Kondo Racing in his second season in 2024. Hibiki Taira, who drove Team Impul's No. 19 car on four occasions in 2024, completed TGMGP's lineup on his full-time debut in the series.
- Juju Noda joined the new Triple Tree Racing team for her second season in the championship after finishing her debut season with TGM Grand Prix in 21st.

==== Mid-season changes ====
- Oliver Rasmussen was forced to withdraw from the first two rounds at Suzuka after suffering a back injury in a crash in free practice. Rasmussen's replacement for the two races was announced to be TGMGP's reserve driver Seita Nonaka, who came 3rd in Super Formula Lights with TOM'S and made his series debut.
- Kamui Kobayashi missed the Motegi double-header due to a calendar clash with the WEC's 6 Hours of Imola. Nonaka deputized once again after doing so for Team Impul at the Suzuka season opener. With Rasmussen still not cleared for competition after his crash at the opening round, Team Impul signed 2024 Super Formula Lights runner-up Rikuto Kobayashi to make his series debut in his place.
- Oliver Rasmussen returned for the third round at Autopolis after he recovered from his back injury.
- Toyota reevaluated the lineup of its TGMGP junior team after round five at Autopolis: reserve driver Seita Nonaka was promoted to one of the team's race seats, while Hibiki Taira was in turn demoted to serve as Toyota's reserve driver.

== Race calendar ==
The calendar was announced on 1 August 2024.

Round	Circuit	Location	Date	Support bill	Map of circuit locations
1	Suzuka International Racing Course	Suzuka, Mie	8 March	Super Formula Lights; Honda N-One Owner's Cup	2025 Super Formula Championship is located in Japan
2	Suzuka International Racing Course	Suzuka, Mie	9 March	Super Formula Lights; Honda N-One Owner's Cup	2025 Super Formula Championship is located in Japan
3	Mobility Resort Motegi	Motegi, Tochigi	19 April	Porsche Carrera Cup Asia; All Japan Road Race Championship	2025 Super Formula Championship is located in Japan
4	Mobility Resort Motegi	Motegi, Tochigi	20 April	Porsche Carrera Cup Asia; All Japan Road Race Championship	2025 Super Formula Championship is located in Japan
5	Autopolis	Hita, Oita	18 May	Super Formula Lights; Honda N-One Owner's Cup	2025 Super Formula Championship is located in Japan
6	Fuji Speedway	Oyama, Shizuoka	19 July	Kyojo Cup; Porsche Carrera Cup Japan	2025 Super Formula Championship is located in Japan
7	Fuji Speedway	Oyama, Shizuoka	20 July	Kyojo Cup; Porsche Carrera Cup Japan	2025 Super Formula Championship is located in Japan
8	Sportsland SUGO	Shibata, Miyagi	10 August	Porsche Carrera Cup Japan; Honda N-One Owner's Cup	2025 Super Formula Championship is located in Japan
9	Fuji Speedway	Oyama, Shizuoka	11 October	Kyojo Cup; Honda N-One Owner's Cup	2025 Super Formula Championship is located in Japan
11	Suzuka International Racing Course	Suzuka, Mie	22 November	Formula Regional Japanese Championship	2025 Super Formula Championship is located in Japan
10 (Note: Postponed second race of the penultimate race weekend of the season.)	Suzuka International Racing Course	Suzuka, Mie	23 November	Formula Regional Japanese Championship	2025 Super Formula Championship is located in Japan
12	Suzuka International Racing Course	Suzuka, Mie	23 November	Formula Regional Japanese Championship	2025 Super Formula Championship is located in Japan

=== Calendar changes ===
- All weekends except the ones at Autopolis and Sportsland Sugo were scheduled as double-headers, making this the longest calendar in Super Formula history. The Sugo round moved from June to August, while the Motegi round moved from August to April
- The series originally planned its first race outside Japan since 2004 with a round held at Inje Speedium. These plans, however, were cancelled in October 2024. It marked the second time that a planned round at Inje was cancelled.
- Race ten, originally scheduled to be held on the same weekend as race nine, was postponed to the final meeting at Suzuka because of fog.

== Regulation changes ==
Double-header race weekends now held two 60-minute practice sessions on a Friday instead of a single 90-minute session. The rounds held at Autopolis and Sugo retained the format previously employed for single-race events, with 90 minutes of practice prior to qualifying on Saturday. Races held on Saturday were now run over a reduced distance of 165km, while races held on Sunday, including those held during the single-race weekends at Autopolis and SUGO, were run over 185km. These longer races no longer had a pre-determined pit window, while the shorter races retained the existing pit window.

A restriction on the teams' activity on race weekends was employed in order to prevent fatigue among staff members. Teams were now required to stop all work carried out in the paddock four hours after the end of the final session, although there were exemptions in cases of cars becoming seriously damaged in incidents.

On October 27, 2025, the Suzuka schedule was changed to accommodate the three-race format. Qualifying sessions for both afternoon races were held on Saturday morning. The Saturday race and Sunday afternoon race retained their standard distances. The Sunday morning race, which was the postponed Fuji race with the grid set by the results of qualifying at Fuji for Round 10, was held over 19 laps (110km) with a 50 minute time limit and no mandatory pit stops.

== Race results ==
Round	Circuit	Pole position	Fastest lap	Winning driver	Winning team
1	Suzuka International Racing Course	(Japan) Tomoki Nojiri	(Japan) Ayumu Iwasa	(Japan) Kakunoshin Ohta	(Japan) Docomo Team Dandelion Racing
2	Suzuka International Racing Course	(Japan) Tomoki Nojiri	(Japan) Ren Sato	(Japan) Tadasuke Makino	(Japan) Docomo Team Dandelion Racing
3	Mobility Resort Motegi	(Japan) Tadasuke Makino	(Japan) Sho Tsuboi	(Japan) Tadasuke Makino	(Japan) Docomo Team Dandelion Racing
4	Mobility Resort Motegi	(Japan) Kenta Yamashita	(Japan) Sho Tsuboi	(Japan) Kakunoshin Ohta	(Japan) Docomo Team Dandelion Racing
5	Autopolis	(Japan) Tomoki Nojiri	(Japan) Ayumu Iwasa	(Japan) Sho Tsuboi	(Japan) Vantelin Team TOM'S
6	Fuji Speedway	(Japan) Tomoki Nojiri	(Japan) Sho Tsuboi	(Japan) Sho Tsuboi	(Japan) Vantelin Team TOM'S
7	Fuji Speedway	(Japan) Sho Tsuboi	(Japan) Kamui Kobayashi	(Japan) Kakunoshin Ohta	(Japan) Docomo Team Dandelion Racing
8	Sportsland SUGO	(Japan) Ayumu Iwasa	(Japan) Ayumu Iwasa	(Japan) Ayumu Iwasa	(Japan) Team Mugen
9	Fuji Speedway	(Argentina) Sacha Fenestraz (Note: Ayumu Iwasa set the fastest time in qualifying, but had all his times deleted after causing a red flag. Fenestraz inherited pole position.)	(Japan) Seita Nonaka	(Argentina) Sacha Fenestraz	(Japan) Vantelin Team TOM'S
11	Suzuka International Racing Course	(Japan) Ayumu Iwasa	(Brazil) Igor Omura Fraga	(Japan) Tomoki Nojiri	(Japan) Team Mugen
10	Suzuka International Racing Course	(Japan) Tadasuke Makino (Note: Race ten, postponed to the final round at Suzuka, had its grid formed according to the results of the qualifying session held at Fuji Speedway on race ten's original date. Tadasuke Makino started the race from pole position.)	(Japan) Tadasuke Makino	(Brazil) Igor Omura Fraga	(Japan) Ponos Nakajima Racing
12	Suzuka International Racing Course	(Japan) Ayumu Iwasa	(Brazil) Igor Omura Fraga	(Japan) Ayumu Iwasa	(Japan) Team Mugen

== Season report ==
=== First half ===
The 2025 Super Formula season began with a Team Mugen 1-2 in qualifying at Suzuka. Tomoki Nojiri led Ayumu Iwasa, but lost out to the Red Bull junior at the start, while Kakunoshin Ohta held third for Dandelion Racing. Three safety cars shaped the 27-lap race, with the second one crucially falling on the opening of the pit window on lap ten. That led to the whole field stopping together, with Mugen forced to double-stack and Nojiri falling out of the top five. That allowed Ohta to rejoin in second, and he passed Iwasa at the start of lap 14 before another incident neutralised proceedings once more. The race resumed on lap 18, where Ohta retained control despite Iwasa remaining within a second. Ohta took his third consecutive Suzuka win by 0.197s, with Nakajima's Ren Sato completing the podium after passing TOM'S driver Sho Tsuboi at Turn 1 on the second restart.

Nojiri and Iwasa repeated their qualifying 1-2 a day later for round two, ahead of the Dandelion pair of Tadasuke Makino and Ohta. Iwasa led the opening lap before stopping early together with Ohta, the latter cutting the final chicane while overtaking Iwasa and receiving a five-second penalty. Makino extended his first stint to lap 20 and briefly ceded position to Ohta after rejoining on cold tyres, but reclaimed the lead on lap 24 using the advantage of fresher rubber. The race ended under the safety car following Kondo's Zak O’Sullivan crashing at Turn 2 after contact with Impul's Seita Nonaka, preventing Ohta from mitigating the penalty and dropping him to 12th. Makino kept the victory after a post-race investigation into the safety car procedure, with Tsuboi classified second and Iwasa third. Iwasa left Suzuka leading the championship on 30 points, seven ahead of Tsuboi.

Round three at Motegi saw Makino lead a Dandelion Racing front-row lockout ahead of Ohta, with Igor Fraga starting third for Nakajima Racing. Makino retained the lead at the start while Fraga moved past Ohta and briefly challenged for first before settling into second. The race was neutralised on the opening lap when Inging's Toshiki Oyu hit Sato at Turn 1. Ohta pitted as soon as the window opened on lap 10, Fraga stopped on lap 17, and Makino responded one lap later. Ohta briefly cycled to the front through the undercut but Makino reclaimed the lead at Turn 1 on lap 22 and pulled away to victory. Ohta held off Fraga for second, while Iwasa rose to fourth with a late stop before retiring with a gear-selection failure, promoting Tsuboi to fourth. That saw Makino end the day with a five-point championship lead over Ohta, with Tsuboi 13 points behind the new leader.

Kondo Racing's Kenta Yamashita claimed pole position for the second Motegi race, but his race unraveled straight away as a collision left TGMGP's Hibiki Taira stranded in the gravel, prompting a first-lap safety car and pitstops for fourteen drivers. Yamashita had a slow stop that saw him lose the lead to Ohta, before his right rear tire came loose and he dropped down the order. Makino led the seven drivers that elected not to stop, holding out in hope of another interruption before pitting on lap 23. He came out in fifth and quickly rose to second, but Ohta had built a twelve-second gap by that point, allowing him to comfortably manage the rest of the race. Iwasa mirrored Makino's strategy, pitting even later on lap 28, to complete the podium in third. Ohta's victory saw him retake the championship lead by a single point over his teammate, with Iwasa behind in third.

Autopolis hosted round five of the season, where Nojiri led Yamashita in qualifying. Tsuboi and Iwasa, who had started fifth and seventh, both had very good getaways that saw them move right behind Nojiri into the podium places as Yamashita dropped to fourth. Iwasa took his mandatory stop on lap 15, with Nojiri and Tsuboi both following on lap 19. That saw Iwasa take the net lead as Tsuboi got past Noriji into a net second place on their outlap. On lap 27, Iwasa's front-right wheel came loose, robbing him of an almost certain maiden victory as he dropped down the field and later retired. Tsuboi took the lead and with it the win, 1.1 seconds ahead of Nojiri, with Yamashita promoted back onto the podium. Pre-race leaders Ohta and Makino finished 13th and eighth, respectively, with Makino retaking a four-point championship lead and Tsuboi now only 14 points behind.

A double-header at Fuji Speedway followed, and Nojiri was once again on top in qualifying. Tsuboi started alongside him in second place, but pressured Nojiri for the opening two laps before taking the lead. The defending champion then pulled away, while Nojiri tried fighting back on strategy by pitting early on lap eleven. Tsuboi stayed out until lap 23, which saw Nojiri retake the net lead of the race. Tsuboi's much fresher tyres saw him soon close up to Nojiri and he retook the lead to win by 6.7 seconds. Iwasa took third by also staying out long and capitalizing on fresher tyres, passing KCMG's Nirei Fukuzumi, who had qualified third and remained there for much of the race, with five laps to go. Points leader Makino finished fifth after a poor start dropped him to tenth, so he was forced to relinquish his championship lead to Tsuboi by two points, with Ohta now third.

=== Second half ===
Tsuboi went one better in qualifying for the second Fuji race by taking pole position ahead of Ohta and Sato. He fended Ohta off at the start as the pair gapped the field. Iwasa elected to stop early on lap eight, before a safety car was called when Nonaka lost a wheel on lap 18. That saw the rest of the leaders pit, and Iwasa was able to take the race lead. A three-way battle between Iwasa, Tsuboi and Ohta followed when racing resumed, with Iwasa trying to keep the other two behind him despite being on older tyres. Ohta moved past Tsuboi into second on lap 31 after the latter failed to move past Iwasa. He shadowed the leader and took the lead going into the first turn on lap 33. Iwasa held on to second, while third for Tsuboi saw him retain the championship lead. Makino came home ninth, dropping to third in the standings, behind Ohta, who trailed Tsuboi by three points.

Qualifying for round eight at Sportsland SUGO saw Iwasa claim his first pole position of the year ahead of TOM'S driver Sacha Fenestraz and Inging's Sena Sakaguchi. Rain meant the race started behind the safety car, and when it was withdrawn on lap six, Fenestraz attacked Iwasa as Tsuboi moved into third. Iwasa fended off Fenestraz and began pulling before the safety car came back out after Sato spun out into the gravel. Iwasa handled the second restart on lap 15, before another interruption followed when ThreeBond's Atsushi Miyake hit the wall after sustaining damage in a collision. Fenestraz could not pressure Iwasa on the final restart, and the Mugen driver pulled away to take his maiden Super Formula victory, and with it second in the standings. Tsuboi lost his podium finish to Fukuzumi after running wide at the final corner, meaning he led Iwasa by five points.

Super Formula's return to Fuji Speedway was heavily affected by rain. Qualifying for the first of the two scheduled races saw Iwasa set the fastest time before crashing into 100R, causing a red flag and deleting his laptime. That saw Fenestraz inherit pole position ahead of Tsuboi and Nojiri. Persistent rain ahead of the race meant it was started behind the safety car, and with conditions not improving, red flags flew after six laps under caution. A restart was tried after 30 minutes. Eight more laps behind the safety car followed, but then the rain worsened again, so the race was abandoned and Fenestraz declared the winner. That saw half points awarded, meaning Tsuboi in third now had a 14.5-point lead over Iwasa. The second race of the weekend was not held because of weather conditions, with the round postponed to the final weekend at Suzuka.

The season's final weekend at Suzuka now held three races, and Iwasa claimed pole position ahead of Nojiri and Fraga for the first of them. He had a slow start, allowing Nojiri past him and Fraga alongside him exiting turn one. The pair made contact through the esses, putting Iwasa into the wall and out of the race. That saw Nojiri lead Fraga and Sato during the ensuing safety car. The race resumed on lap six, before another safety car was called on lap nine after a crash for O'Sullivan. That saw the entire field make their mandatory pit stop on lap ten, shuffling Sato down the order as a result of him being directly behind his teammate. Makino benefitted to move into third place. The order remained static at the top for the rest of the race, allowing Fraga to claim the Rookie of the Year title with his maiden podium and Tsuboi to extend his lead to 16.5 points after finishing fourth.

The penultimate race of the season retained the starting grid set in qualifying at Fuji, putting Makino on pole position ahead of Fraga. The freshly crowned Rookie of the Year converted the best qualifying result of his Super Formula career into the race lead right into the first corner, with Makino consigned to second, Ohta slotting into third and Iwasa taking fourth. With no mandatory pitstops during the shortened race, the order at the front remained static throughout. Fraga scored an unchallenged maiden victory, the first for his Nakajima Racing team since 2022. The three championship contenders behind him all closed on Tsuboi in the standings, as the reigning champion was only able to take seventh. That saw both Dandelion drivers trail Tsuboi by 9.5 points, with Iwasa a further three points behind going into the final race of the season.

Iwasa claimed a crucial pole position for the final race of the season to reduce his deficit to Tsuboi by a further three points. This time, his start was clean and he slotted into the lead as Sato moved past Nojiri into second place. He got his mandatory pitstop out of the way on lap seven, before a safety car was called on lap eleven. That saw the rest of the field stop to change tyres, with Iwasa keeping the lead and Ohta moving up to second place. Sato moved back into second place on lap 15, before chasing down Iwasa. With Tsuboi in seventh, losing the lead would have also cost Iwasa the title, but he held the lead for the rest of the race to take his second Super Formula victory and with it also the championship title. Ohta in third sealed the same place in the championship standings, 1.5 points behind runner-up Tsuboi.

The 2025 Super Formula Championship delivered the closest title fight in recent history. Iwasa started the season strongly to leave the opening double-header leading the standings, before the Dandelion pair of Ohta and Makino dominated at Motegi. The next few races belonged to defending champion Tsuboi, who held on to the championship lead the longest, claiming it after the first race at Fuji and leading until the final race. That race began with Iwasa fourth in the standings, but winning when it counted coupled with a rare weekend off the pace for Tsuboi saw Iwasa take the title by just 4.5 points.

== Championship standings ==
=== Scoring system ===
Race points

Position	**1st**	**2nd**	**3rd**	**4th**	**5th**	**6th**	**7th**	**8th**	**9th**	**10th**
Points	20	15	11	8	6	5	4	3	2	1

Qualifying points

Position	**1st**	**2nd**	**3rd**
Points	3	2	1

=== Drivers' championship ===
Pos	Driver	SUZ1		MOT		AUT	FUJ1		SUG	FUJ2	SUZ2			Pts
Pos	Driver	R1	R2	R3	R4	R5	R6	R7	R8	R9 (Note: The first race was stopped due to bad weather conditions after less than 75% of laps were completed. Therefore, half points were awarded.)	R11	R10	R12	Pts
1	(Japan) Ayumu Iwasa	2^{2}	3^{2}	Ret	3	Ret	3	2	**1**^{1}	21	**Ret**^{1}	4	**1**^{1}	124
2	(Japan) Sho Tsuboi	4	2	4	Ret	1	1^{2}	**3**^{1}	4	2^{2}	4	7	8	119.5
3	(Japan) Kakunoshin Ohta	1^{3}	12^{3}	2^{2}	1^{2}	13	10	1^{2}	8	7	5	3^{3}	3	118
4	(Japan) Tadasuke Makino	10	1	**1**^{1}	2^{3}	6	5	9	10	4	3	**2**^{1}	5	113
5	(Japan) Tomoki Nojiri	**7**^{1}	**4**^{1}	9	10	**2**^{1}	**2**^{1}	12	15	3^{3}	1^{2}	5	10^{2}	94.5
6	(Brazil) Igor Omura Fraga	18	5	3^{3}	9	8	9	18	6	8	2^{3}	1^{2}	4	77.5
7	(Japan) Ren Sato	3	6	Ret	12	4	11	6^{3}	Ret	5	9	6	2^{3}	56
8	(Argentina) Sacha Fenestraz	11	16	8	4	17	13	5	2^{2}	**1**^{1}	8	17	12	50
9	(Japan) Nirei Fukuzumi	Ret	14	5	16	9	4^{3}	Ret	3	12	7	9	6	39
10	(Japan) Sena Sakaguchi	6	15	6	5	5	7	11	5^{3}	9	14	11	7	38
11	(Japan) Kenta Yamashita	9	11	7	**13**^{1}	3^{2}	12	8	9	10	11	14	14	27.5
12	(Japan) Toshiki Oyu	Ret	7	Ret	7	10	8	7	12	6	12	8	Ret	21.5
13	(Japan) Kamui Kobayashi	5	9			7^{3}	22	4	19	14	15	15	15	21
14	(Japan) Kazuya Oshima	13	10	10	6	15	6	10	18	13	6	10	18	19
15	(United Kingdom) Zak O'Sullivan	8	22†	12	11	Ret	14	16	7	11	Ret	20	17	7
16	(Japan) Syun Koide	14	8	14	14	20	15	17	13	22	13	13	9	5
17	(Japan) Seita Nonaka	17	19	11	8		19	Ret	16	18	16	18	Ret	3
18	(Japan) Atsushi Miyake	Ret	13	17	18	18	21	NC	Ret	19	10	12	16	1
19	(Japan) Mitsunori Takaboshi	12	20	15	19	11	17	14	11	16	18	19	13	0
20	(Japan) Kazuto Kotaka	Ret	18	18	15	12	18	15	14	15	Ret	16	11	0
21	(Denmark) Oliver Rasmussen	WD	WD			14	16	13	17	17	19	21	19	0
22	(Japan) Hibiki Taira	15	17	13	Ret	16								0
23	(Japan) "Juju"	16	21	19	17	19	20	NC	20	20	17	22	20	0
24	(Japan) Rikuto Kobayashi			16	Ret									0
Pos	Driver	R1	R2	R3	R4	R5	R6	R7	R8	R9	R11	R10	R12	Pts
Pos	Driver	SUZ1		MOT		AUT	FUJ1		SUG	FUJ2	SUZ2			Pts

Key
Colour	Result
Gold	Winner
Silver	Second place
Bronze	Third place
Green	Other points position
Blue	Other classified position
Blue	Not classified, finished (NC)
Purple	Not classified, retired (Ret)
Red	Did not qualify (DNQ)
Red	Did not pre-qualify (DNPQ)
Black	Disqualified (DSQ)
White	Did not start (DNS)
White	Race cancelled (C)
Blank	Did not practice (DNP)
Blank	Excluded (EX)
Blank	Did not arrive (DNA)
Blank	Withdrawn (WD)
Blank	Did not enter (cell empty)
Text formatting	Meaning
**Bold**	Pole position
Italics	Fastest lap

Notes:

- † – Driver did not finish the race, but was classified as they completed more than 90% of the race distance.

=== Teams' championship ===
Pos	Driver	SUZ1		MOT		AUT	FUJ1		SUG	FUJ2	SUZ2			Pts
Pos	Driver	R1	R2	R3	R4	R5	R6	R7	R8	R9	R11	R10	R12	Pts
1	(Japan) Docomo Team Dandelion Racing	1	1	1	1	6	5	1	8	4	3	2	3	215
1	(Japan) Docomo Team Dandelion Racing	10	12	2	2	13	10	9	10	7	5	3	5	215
2	(Japan) Team Mugen	2	3	9	3	2	2	2	1	3	1	4	1	188.5
2	(Japan) Team Mugen	7	4	Ret	10	Ret	3	12	15	21	Ret	5	10	188.5
3	(Japan) Vantelin Team TOM'S	4	2	4	4	1	1	3	2	1	4	7	8	157.5
3	(Japan) Vantelin Team TOM'S	11	16	8	Ret	17	13	5	4	2	8	17	12	157.5
4	(Japan) Ponos Nakajima Racing	3	5	3	9	4	9	6	6	5	2	1	2	127.5
4	(Japan) Ponos Nakajima Racing	18	6	Ret	12	8	11	18	Ret	8	9	6	4	127.5
5	(Hong Kong) Kids com Team KCMG	5	9	5	8	7	4	4	3	12	7	9	6	61
5	(Hong Kong) Kids com Team KCMG	Ret	14	11	16	9	22	Ret	19	14	15	15	15	61
6	(Japan) Sanki Vertex Partners Cerumo・Inging	6	7	6	5	5	7	7	5	6	12	8	7	58.5
6	(Japan) Sanki Vertex Partners Cerumo・Inging	Ret	15	Ret	7	10	8	11	12	9	14	11	Ret	58.5
7	(Japan) Kondo Racing	8	11	7	11	3	12	8	7	10	11	14	14	29.5
7	(Japan) Kondo Racing	9	22†	12	13	Ret	14	16	9	11	Ret	20	17	29.5
8	(Japan) docomo business Rookie	13	10	10	6	15	6	10	18	13	6	10	18	19
9	(Japan) San-Ei Gen with B-Max	14	8	14	14	20	15	17	13	22	13	13	9	5
10	(Japan) ThreeBond Racing	Ret	13	17	18	18	21	NC	Ret	19	10	12	16	1
11	(Japan) Itochu Enex Wecars Team Impul	12	19	15	19	11	16	13	11	16	18	19	13	0
11	(Japan) Itochu Enex Wecars Team Impul	17	20	16	Ret	14	17	14	17	17	19	21	19	0
12	(Japan) KDDI TGMGP TGR-DC	15	17	13	15	12	18	15	14	15	16	16	11	0
12	(Japan) KDDI TGMGP TGR-DC	Ret	18	18	Ret	16	19	Ret	16	18	Ret	18	Ret	0
13	(Japan) Hazama Ando Triple Tree Racing	16	21	19	17	19	20	NC	20	20	17	22	20	0
Pos	Driver	R1	R2	R3	R4	R5	R6	R7	R8	R9	R11	R10	R12	Pts
Pos	Driver	SUZ1		MOT		AUT	FUJ1		SUG	FUJ2	SUZ2			Pts

Notes:

- † – Driver did not finish the race, but was classified as they completed more than 90% of the race distance.
