= Ren Sato (racing driver) =

Japanese racing driver

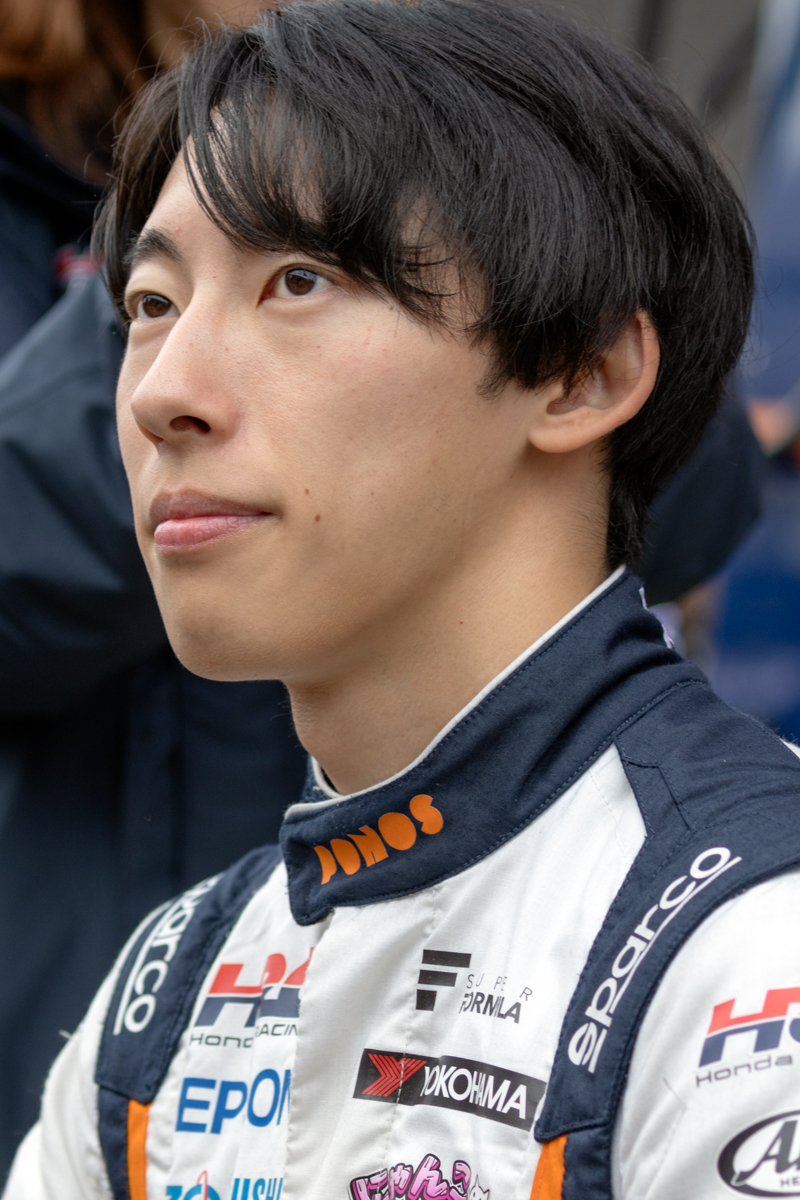
- Sato at Suzuka Circuit in November 2024
- Nationality: (Japan) Japanese
- Born: 5 August 2001 (age 25) Yokohama, Kanagawa, Japan

Super Formula career
- Debut season: 2022
- Current team: Nakajima Racing
- Car number: 65
- Former teams: Team Goh
- Starts: 34
- Wins: 0
- Podiums: 3
- Poles: 0
- Fastest laps: 2
- Best finish: 7th in 2025

Super GT - GT500 career
- Debut season: 2024
- Current team: ARTA
- Car number: 16
- Starts: 16
- Wins: 0
- Podiums: 2
- Poles: 2
- Fastest laps: 0
- Best finish: 8th in 2025

Previous series
- 2021 2021 2019-2020 2018-2019: Super GT GT300; Super Formula Lights; French F4 Championship; F4 Japanese Championship

Championship titles
- 2019: F4 Japanese Championship

Ren Sato (佐藤蓮, Satō Ren; born 5 August 2001) is a Japanese racing driver who currently competes in Super GT for ARTA and in Super Formula for PONOS Nakajima Racing. He is a factory driver for Honda, and a former member of the Red Bull Junior Team and Honda Formula Dream Project.

He is not related to two-time Indianapolis 500 winner Takuma Sato or sports car racer Marino Sato.

== Career ==
=== Formula 4 ===
Sato made his single-seater debut with Honda Formula Dream Project in the 2018 FIA F4 Japanese Championship. He finished seventh in the championship with 58 points in his first season. In 2019, Sato dominated the Japanese F4 circuit en route to his first racing championship. He won 11 out of the season's 14 races, including eight wins in a row to end the season, and finished on the podium in all but one race. Sato clinched the 2019 championship in the penultimate race meeting at Sportsland Sugo, and won the championship by 164 points.

Sato took part in the 2019 French F4 Championship round at Circuit de Nevers Magny-Cours as a guest driver. In 2020, Sato, along with Ayumu Iwasa, raced full-time in the French F4 Championship. Sato finished the season runner-up in the standings behind Iwasa, with four wins and 12 podiums.

=== Super Formula Lights ===
Sato would return to the Japanese circuit after just one season in Europe, competing in the 2021 Super Formula Lights championship with TODA Racing. He won four of the last six races of the season, including a sweep of the August race meeting at Motegi, to finish the year third in the championship behind champion Teppei Natori, and runner-up Giuliano Alesi.

=== Super GT ===
==== GT300 ====
Sato made his Super GT Series debut in 2021, driving the ARTA Honda NSX GT3 in the GT300 class along with two-time series champion Shinichi Takagi. The team finished fourth in the championship, collecting three podium finishes at Fuji Speedway, Sugo, and Motegi, although their results were intermixed with four finishes outside the top nineteen.

In the final race of the season at Fuji, Sato influenced the outcome of the GT500 class championship in controversial manner. While racing the Subaru BRZ of Hideki Yamauchi for position, he went for an overtake into turn one, but braked too late and crashed into the GT500 class Stanley Honda NSX-GT of Naoki Yamamoto, who was in position to win the GT500 championship with 15 laps remaining. The incident took out both Sato and Yamamoto from the race, and it ultimately cost Yamamoto and Team Kunimitsu the GT500 titles, which were won by TOM's and drivers Yuhi Sekiguchi and Sho Tsuboi. After the race, Sato admitted that he was fully responsible for the incident. For 2022, Sato was dropped from Honda's Super GT lineup with his place at the No. 55 ARTA team taken by rookie Iori Kimura. However, Honda affirmed their commitment to Sato by announcing him as a Super Formula driver for 2022.

==== GT500 ====
Sato returned to Super GT in 2024, as he competed in GT500 with his former team ARTA. He was partnered with Hiroki Otsu.

=== Super Formula ===
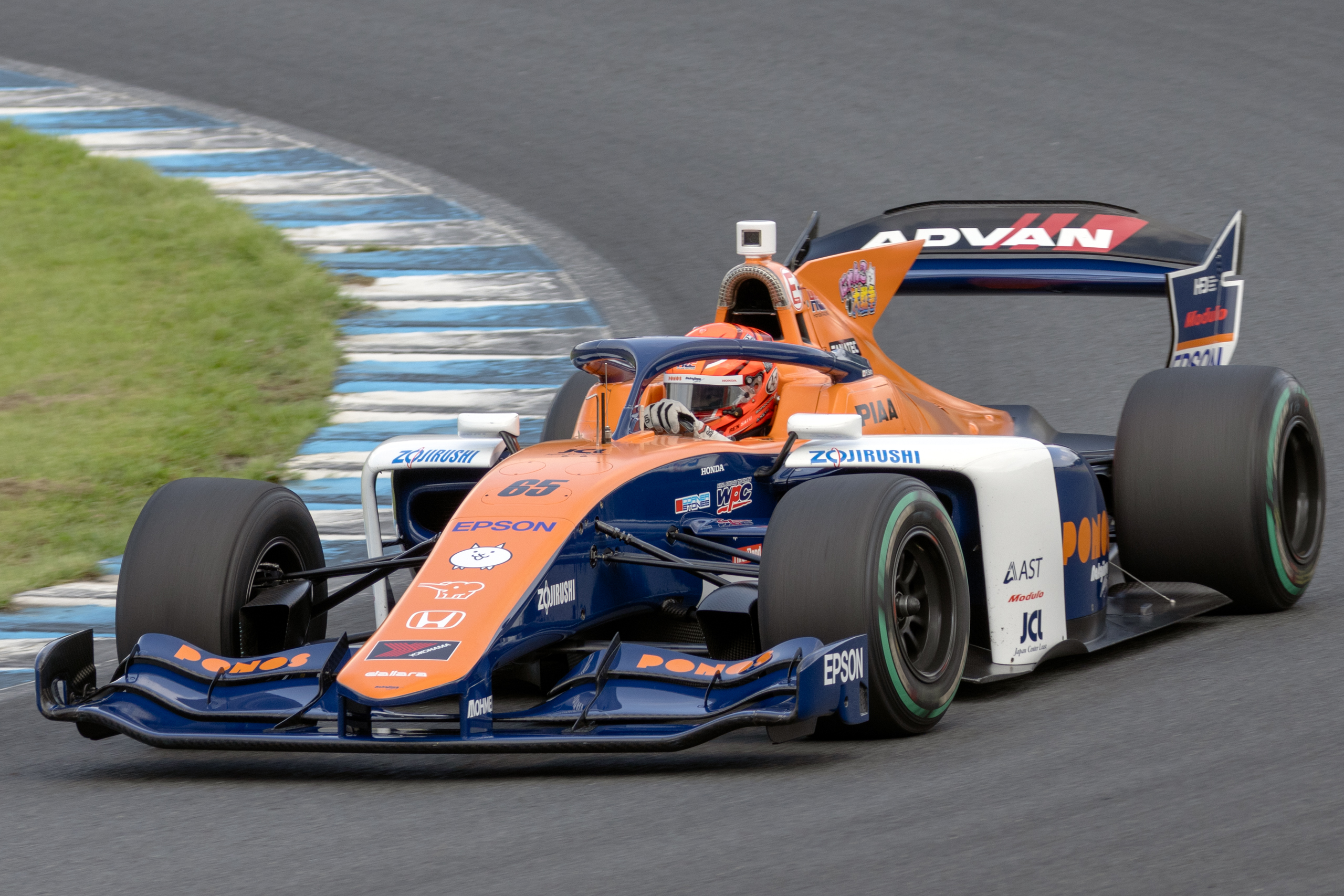
Sato at Mobility Resort Motegi in 2024

Sato took part in the Super Formula manufacturer and rookie test at Suzuka Circuit on 7-9 December, driving the number 15 Red Bull Mugen Team Goh car. Sato finished as the fastest of four rookies on the final day. On 14 January 2022, Sato was announced as a Super Formula driver for Honda. He joined Team Goh, who spun off from Team Mugen and formed a two-car team in 2022. In February 2022, it was announced that Sato would join the Red Bull Junior Team. He would be released from the Junior Team the next year. Sato won Rookie of the Year honours ahead of his team mate, Atsushi Miyake, and recorded his first podium in the JAF Grand Prix Suzuka. Sato moved to Nakajima Racing to replace Toshiki Oyu. Sato stayed with the team for 2024.

== Racing record ==
=== Career summary ===
Season	Series	Team	Races	Wins	Poles	F/Laps	Podiums	Points	Position
2018	F4 Japanese Championship	Honda Formula Dream Project	14	0	0	2	0	58	7th
2019	F4 Japanese Championship	Honda Formula Dream Project	14	11	8	5	13	311	**1st**
2019	French F4 Championship	FFSA Academy	3	0	0	0	0	0	NC†
2020	French F4 Championship	FFSA Academy	21	4	2	6	12	257	**2nd**
2021	Super GT Series - GT300	Autobacs Racing Team Aguri	8	0	0	1	3	45	4th
2021	Super Formula Lights	Toda Racing	17	5	4	6	9	92	**3rd**
2022	Super Formula	Team Goh	10	0	0	1	1	25	12th
2023	Super Formula	TCS Nakajima Racing	8	0	0	0	0	17.5	10th
2023	Super Taikyu - ST-TCR	AI' Racing	1	0	0	0	0	37.5‡	**2nd‡**
2024	Super Formula	PONOS Nakajima Racing	9	0	0	0	0	22	11th
2024	Super GT - GT500	ARTA	8	0	0	0	1	35	12th
2024	Super Taikyu - ST-Q	Team HRC							
2025	Super Formula	PONOS Nakajima Racing	12	0	0	1	2	56	7th
2025	Super GT- GT500	ARTA	8	0	2	1	1	32	8th
2026	Super Formula	PONOS Nakajima Racing							
2026	Super GT - GT500	ARTA Mugen	8	1	0	1	1	45	7th
2026	Super Taikyu - ST-TCR	M&K Racing							

^{†} As Sato was a guest driver, he was ineligible to score points.
* Season still in progress.

‡ Team standings

=== Complete F4 Japanese Championship results ===
(key) (Races in bold indicate pole position; races in italics indicate points for the fastest lap of top ten finishers)

Year	Team	1	2	3	4	5	6	7	8	9	10	11	12	13	14	DC	Points
2018	Honda Formula Dream Project	OKA; 1; 15	OKA; 2; 9	FUJ1; 1; 6	FUJ1; 2 Ret	SUZ; 1; 4	SUZ; 2; 5	FUJ2; 1; 10	FUJ2; 2; 6	SUG; 1; 10	SUG; 2; 8	AUT; 1; 14	AUT; 2; 13	MOT; 1; 7	MOT; 2; 7	7th	58
2019	Honda Formula Dream Project	**OKA**; **1**; 1	OKA; 2; 20	**FUJ1**; **1**; 1	**FUJ1**; **2**; 1	SUZ; 1; 2	SUZ; 2; 2	**FUJ2**; **1**; 1	**FUJ2**; **2**; 1	AUT; 1; 1	**AUT**; **2**; 1	SUG; 1; 1	SUG; 2; 1	**MOT**; **1**; 1	**MOT**; **2**; 1	1st	311

=== Complete French F4 Championship results ===
(key) (Races in bold indicate pole position) (Races in italics indicate fastest lap)

Year	1	2	3	4	5	6	7	8	9	10	11	12	13	14	15	16	17	18	19	20	21	Pos	Points
2019	NOG; 1	NOG; 2	NOG; 3	PAU; 1	PAU; 2	PAU; 3	SPA; 1	SPA; 2	SPA; 3	LÉD; 1	LÉD; 2	LÉD; 3	HUN; 1	HUN; 2	HUN; 3	MAG; 1; 19	MAG; 2; 11	MAG; 3; 11	LEC; 1	LEC; 2	LEC; 3	NC†	0
2020	NOG; 1; 2	NOG; 2; 14†	NOG; 3; 2	**MAG**; **1**; 1	MAG; 2; 6	**MAG**; **3**; 1	ZAN; 1; 3	ZAN; 2; 3	ZAN; 3; 6	LEC1; 1; 2	LEC1; 2; 1	LEC1; 3; 3	SPA; 1; 4	SPA; 2; 1	SPA; 3; 3	LEC2; 1; 4	LEC2; 2; 4	LEC2; 3; 4	LEC3; 1; 6	LEC3; 2; 4	LEC3; 3; 2	2nd	257

^{†} As Sato was a guest driver, he was ineligible to score points.

=== Complete Super Formula Lights results ===
(key) (Races in bold indicate pole position) (Races in italics indicate fastest lap)

Year	Entrant	1	2	3	4	5	6	7	8	9	10	11	12	13	14	15	16	17	18	Pos	Points
2021	Toda Racing	FUJ; 1; 2	FUJ; 2; 1	FUJ; 3; 9	SUZ; 1; 12†	SUZ; 2; 2	SUZ; 3; 5	AUT; 1; 9	AUT; 2; 9	AUT; 3 C	SUG; 1; 7	SUG; 2; 2	SUG; 3; 6	**MOT**; **1**; 1	**MOT**; **2**; 1	MOT; 3; 1	MOT; 1; 2	MOT; 2; 1	MOT; 3; 4	3rd	92

=== Complete Super GT results ===
(key) (Races in bold indicate pole position) (Races in italics indicate fastest lap)

Year	Team	Car	Class	1	2	3	4	5	6	7	8	9	DC	Points
2021	ARTA	Honda NSX GT3 Evo	GT300	OKA; 26	FUJ; 3	SUZ; 23	MOT; 7	SUG; 2	AUT; 20	MOT; 2	FUJ; 24		4th	45
2024	ARTA	Honda Civic Type R-GT	GT500	OKA; 9	FUJ; 15	SUZ; 3^{2}	FUJ; 11	SUZ; 10	SUG; 6	AUT; 4	MOT; 5		12th	35
2025	ARTA	Honda Civic Type R-GT	GT500	OKA; Ret	FUJ; 11	SEP; 12	FS1 (13)	FS2; 14	**SUZ**; 4	**SUG**; 4	AUT; 3	MOT; 8	8th	32
2026	ARTA Mugen	Honda Prelude-GT	GT500	OKA; 6	FUJ; 5	FUJ; 9	SUZ; 1	SUG; Ret	AUT; 9	MOT; 6	MOT; 6		7th	45

^{‡} Half points awarded as less than 75% of race distance was completed.
^{(Number)} Driver did not take part in this sprint race, points are still awarded for the teammate's result.
^{*} Season still in progress.

=== Complete Super Formula results ===
(key) (Races in bold indicate pole position) (Races in italics indicate fastest lap)

Year	Team	Engine	1	2	3	4	5	6	7	8	9	10	11	12	DC	Points
2022	Team Goh	Honda	FUJ; 9^{2}	FUJ; 13	SUZ; 10	AUT; 17	SUG; 16	FUJ; 6	MOT; 12	MOT; 7	SUZ; 3	SUZ; 19			12th	25
2023	TCS Nakajima Racing	Honda	FUJ; 6	FUJ; 9	SUZ; DNS	AUT; 7	SUG; 12	FUJ; 5	MOT; 16	SUZ; 10	SUZ; Ret				10th	17.5
2024	PONOS Nakajima Racing	Honda	SUZ; 5	AUT; Ret	SUG; 11	FUJ; 7	MOT; 10	FUJ; 7	FUJ; DSQ	SUZ; Ret^{3}	SUZ; 5				11th	22
2025	PONOS Nakajima Racing	Honda	SUZ; 3	SUZ; 6	MOT; Ret	MOT; 12	AUT; 4	FUJ; 11	FUJ; 6^{3}	SUG; Ret	FUJ; 5‡	SUZ; 9	SUZ; 6	SUZ; 2^{3}	7th	56
2026	PONOS Nakajima Racing	Honda	MOT; 3^{3}	MOT; 11	AUT; Ret	SUZ; 9	SUZ	FUJ	FUJ	SUG	FUJ	FUJ	SUZ	SUZ	10th	8,5

^{‡} Half points awarded as less than 75% of race distance was completed.
^{*} Season still in progress.

Sporting positions
Preceded by Yuki Tsunoda	F4 Japanese Championship; Champion; 2019	Succeeded by Hibiki Taira
Preceded by Hiroki Otsu	Super Formula; Rookie Champion; 2022	Succeeded by Liam Lawson
