= 2019 F4 Japanese Championship =

Motor racing competition

The 2019 F4 Japanese Championship season was the fifth season of the F4 Japanese Championship. It began on 13 April in Okayama and finished on 3 November in Twin Ring Motegi after seven double header rounds.

== Teams and drivers ==
All teams were Japanese-registered

Team	No.	Driver	Class	Rounds
Team Right Way	2	(Japan) Keiji Nakao	I	All
Field Motorsport	3	(Japan) Sergeyevich Sato	I	All
Daydream Racing	4	(Japan) Yuichi Sasaki	I	2, 4, 6–7
Honda Formula Dream Project	5	(Japan) Atsushi Miyake		All
Honda Formula Dream Project	6	(Japan) Kakunoshin Ohta		All
Honda Formula Dream Project	7	(Japan) Ren Sato		All
Honda Formula Dream Project	8	(Japan) Miki Koyama		3–7
ATEAM Buzz Motorsport	9	(Japan) Yusuke Shiotsu		All
ATEAM Buzz Motorsport	18	(Japan) Masaki Baba		4
ATEAM Buzz Motorsport	18	(Japan) Hideki Hirota	I	5
Rn-sports	10	(Japan) Makoto Hotta	I	All
Rn-sports	11	(Japan) Ryuichirou Ishizaki		1–3
Rn-sports	11	(Japan) Masayuki Ueda		4–7
Rn-sports	12	(Japan) Masayuki Ueda		2–3
Zap Speed	14	(Japan) Kotaro Sakurai		3–7
Zap Speed	43	(Japan) Motoyoshi Yoshida	I	All
Zap Speed	99	(Japan) Kotaro Sakurai		2
Media Do Kageyama Racing	15	(Japan) Takuro Shinohara		2–3
Media Do Kageyama Racing	15	(Japan) Masakatsu Takatsu		4
Media Do Kageyama Racing	15	(Japan) Kaito Tsukada		6
Media Do Kageyama Racing	16	(Japan) Daisuke Watanabe		All
Media Do Kageyama Racing	24	(Japan) Reiji Hiraki		All
Silver Star Racing	19	(Japan) Ryo Komikado		4
Silver Star Racing	20	(Japan) Iori Kimura		All
M2 HDR Racing	21	(Japan) "Ryo"		3
L.B. Japan Racing	22	(Japan) "Don Luciano"	I	5
N-SPEED	23	(Japan) "Yugo"	I	All
Team Samurai	25	(Japan) Fuma Horio		All
Saccess Racing	26	(Japan) Ryunosuke Shibata		4
Saccess Racing	26	(Japan) Ryunosuke Sawa		7
Saccess Racing	39	(Japan) Daichi Okamoto		All
Saccess Racing	40	(Thailand) Teravate Pukpiboon		1
B-MAX Engineering	27	(Japan) "Syuji"	I	All
B-MAX Engineering	30	(Japan) "Dragon"	I	1–2, 4–7
Eagle Sports	28	(Japan) Makio Saito	I	All
RS Fine	29	(Japan) Yasushi Ide	I	3
NRS	31	(Japan) Takumi Saigusa		1–4
NRS	31	(Japan) Masaya Kono		5
Ashida MFG	33	(Japan) Mitsuji Inagaki	I	5
RT WORLD	34	(Japan) Hironori Kikuchi	I	2
TOM'S Spirit	36	(Japan) Seita Nonaka		All
TOM'S Spirit	37	(Japan) Hibiki Taira		All
IMS	44	(Japan) Sho Onodera		2
OTG Motor Sports	60	(Japan) Togo Suganami		All
OTG Motor Sports	80	(Japan) Masamitsu Ohtake		All
Le Beausset Motorsports	62	(Japan) Seiya Jin		All
Le Beausset Motorsports	63	(Japan) Kohta Kawaai		All
Nagisa Auto Motor Sports	71	(Japan) Masayoshi Oyama	I	All
C.S.I.-Reon Kids Racing	73	(Japan) Shunsuke Hanawa		1–4, 6–7
Skill Speed	77	(Japan) Takeshi Ohi		1–3
Skill Speed	77	(Japan) Sota Ogawa		4–7
Sashi Speed	86	(Japan) Hachiro Osaka	I	All
Team Right Way	88	(Japan) Yoshifumi Shigemori	I	6
Akiland Racing	96	(Japan) Rin Arakawa	I	7
Bionic Jack Racing	97	(Japan) Mizuki Ishizaka		5–7
Bionic Jack Racing	98	(Japan) "Ikari"	I	1–3, 5–7
Bionic Jack Racing	98	(Japan) Mizuki Ishizaka		4

Icon	Class
I	Independent Cup

== Race calendar and results ==
All rounds will be held in Japan. The "2019 FIA Formula 1 World Championship Round 17 Japan Grand Prix Race" will be held at Suzuka Circuit on October 11-13, 2019 first time as a support race event. This "FIA-F4 Dream Cup Race" (tentative name) will be a special non-points race. Other rounds supporting of the Super GT events.

Round		Circuit	Date	Pole position	Fastest lap	Winning driver	Winning team
1	R1	Okayama International Circuit, Mimasaka	13 April	(Japan) Ren Sato	(Japan) Ren Sato	(Japan) Ren Sato	Honda Formula Dream Project
1	R2	Okayama International Circuit, Mimasaka	14 April	(Japan) Kakunoshin Ohta	(Japan) Ren Sato	(Japan) Atsushi Miyake	Honda Formula Dream Project
2	R1	Fuji Speedway, Oyama	3 May	(Japan) Ren Sato	(Japan) Reiji Hiraki	(Japan) Ren Sato	Honda Formula Dream Project
2	R2	Fuji Speedway, Oyama	4 May	(Japan) Ren Sato	(Japan) Seita Nonaka	(Japan) Ren Sato	Honda Formula Dream Project
3	R1	Suzuka Circuit, Suzuka	25 May	(Japan) Kakunoshin Ohta	(Japan) Kakunoshin Ohta	(Japan) Kakunoshin Ohta	Honda Formula Dream Project
3	R2	Suzuka Circuit, Suzuka	26 May	(Japan) Kakunoshin Ohta	(Japan) Ren Sato	(Japan) Kakunoshin Ohta	Honda Formula Dream Project
4	R1	Fuji Speedway, Oyama	3 August	(Japan) Ren Sato	(Japan) Kakunoshin Ohta	(Japan) Ren Sato	Honda Formula Dream Project
4	R2	Fuji Speedway, Oyama	4 August	(Japan) Ren Sato	(Japan) Seita Nonaka	(Japan) Ren Sato	Honda Formula Dream Project
5	R1	Autopolis, Hita	7 September	(Japan) Atsushi Miyake	(Japan) Atsushi Miyake	(Japan) Ren Sato	Honda Formula Dream Project
5	R2	Autopolis, Hita	8 September	(Japan) Ren Sato	(Japan) Reiji Hiraki	(Japan) Ren Sato	Honda Formula Dream Project
6	R1	Sportsland SUGO, Murata	21 September	(Japan) Atsushi Miyake	(Japan) Ren Sato	(Japan) Ren Sato	Honda Formula Dream Project
6	R2	Sportsland SUGO, Murata	22 September	(Japan) Atsushi Miyake	(Japan) Ren Sato	(Japan) Ren Sato	Honda Formula Dream Project
NC	R1	Suzuka Circuit, Suzuka	12 October	Round cancelled due to Typhoon Hagibis			
NC	R2	Suzuka Circuit, Suzuka	13 October	Round cancelled due to Typhoon Hagibis			
7	R1	Twin Ring Motegi, Motegi	2 November	(Japan) Ren Sato	(Japan) Reiji Hiraki	(Japan) Ren Sato	Honda Formula Dream Project
7	R2	Twin Ring Motegi, Motegi	3 November	(Japan) Ren Sato	(Japan) Kohta Kawaai	(Japan) Ren Sato	Honda Formula Dream Project

== Championship standings ==
Points were awarded as follows:

Position	**1st**	**2nd**	**3rd**	**4th**	**5th**	**6th**	**7th**	**8th**	**9th**	**10th**
Points	25	18	15	12	10	8	6	4	2	1

=== Drivers' standings ===
Pos	Driver	OKA		FUJ1		SUZ		FUJ2		AUT		SUG		MOT		Points
1	(Japan) Ren Sato	**1**	20	**1**	**1**	2	2	**1**	**1**	1	**1**	1	1	**1**	**1**	311
2	(Japan) Atsushi Miyake	14	1	11	10	3	3	9	Ret	**2**	2	**2**	**2**	9	3	147
3	(Japan) Kohta Kawaai	20	5	5	3	7	6	6	6	5	3	3	6	Ret	2	131
4	(Japan) Reiji Hiraki	5	7	10	2	8	8	Ret	2	8	4	4	5	2	4	129
5	(Japan) Togo Suganami	3	2	8	6	4	4	2	3	7	7	6	7	Ret	Ret	128
6	(Japan) Kakunoshin Ohta	Ret	**Ret**	2	5	**1**	**1**	4	9	3	6	18	27	8	7	125
7	(Japan) Hibiki Taira	4	8	7	4	5	5	23	4	12	32	5	3	5	Ret	101
8	(Japan) Seita Nonaka	2	3	4	8	35	7	29	11	10	10	7	4	7	6	89
9	(Japan) Iori Kimura	7	4	13	12	13	9	Ret	7	6	5	Ret	23	3	5	69
10	(Japan) Daichi Okamoto	6	6	3	9	6	Ret	5	8	14	13	12	14	6	9	65
11	(Japan) Mizuki Ishizaka							3	5	9	8	14	12	Ret	8	35
12	(Japan) Seiya Jin	Ret	DNS	9	7	9	Ret	7	10	11	9	8	30	Ret	10	24
13	(Japan) Sota Ogawa							12	Ret	4	31	10	10	Ret	Ret	14
14	(Japan) Kotaro Sakurai			Ret	Ret	15	13	Ret	14	18	11	Ret	11	4	25	12
15	(Japan) Yusuke Shiotsu	8	9	Ret	DNS	11	10	11	12	16	17	9	13	11	14	9
16	(Japan) Takuro Shinohara			6	17	12	12									8
17	(Japan) Miki Koyama					17	Ret	8	13	13	14	13	9	10	11	7
18	(Japan) Masamitsu Ohtake	10	11	15	15	14	Ret	Ret	15	15	12	11	8	Ret	13	5
19	(Japan) Takeshi Ohi	9	10	12	11	16	Ret									3
20	(Japan) Ryuichirou Ishizaki	28	12	20	13	10	11									1
21	(Japan) Daisuke Watanabe	Ret	Ret	14	23	28	Ret	10	16	Ret	15	16	31	13	24	1
22	(Japan) "Dragon"	11	14	19	26			15	35	20	23	24	17	Ret	17	0
23	(Japan) Ryunosuke Sawa													12	12	0
24	(Japan) Sergeyevich Sato	12	15	21	25	19	17	20	21	21	18	17	19	17	32	0
25	(Japan) Fuma Horio	13	24	33	14	18	Ret	13	17	17	16	15	15	16	18	0
26	(Japan) Keizi Nakao	27	13	18	Ret	27	21	17	29	19	28	22	28	18	19	0
27	(Japan) Shunsuke Hanawa	16	27	16	18	30	16	14	18			20	16	15	16	0
28	(Japan) Rin Arakawa													14	15	0
29	(Japan) Masayuki Ueda			22	Ret	20	14	18	20	34	19	21	Ret	20	22	0
30	(Thailand) Teravate Pukpiboon	15	16													0
31	(Japan) "Ikari"	19	17	25	24	21	15			23	20	25	32	27	23	0
32	(Japan) Takumi Saigusa	17	23	23	16	23	19	16	19							0
33	(Japan) Sho Onedera			17	28											0
34	(Japan) Yuichi Sasaki			26	20			22	25			19	18	19	21	0
35	(Japan) Makoto Hotta	18	21	29	22	24	20	19	24	28	29	26	21	22	27	0
36	(Japan) Makio Saito	23	Ret	24	19	22	18	21	34	24	22	23	20	23	26	0
37	(Japan) Motoyoshi Yoshida	21	18	28	29	32	26	30	26	26	Ret	27	26	Ret	28	0
38	(Japan) Hachiro Osaka	24	19	27	Ret	26	22	25	28	25	30	29	22	21	20	0
39	(Japan) "Syuji"	26	25	30	21	31	25	27	33	30	26	Ret	25	26	29	0
40	(Japan) Masaya Kono									31	21					0
41	(Japan) Masayoshi Oyama	22	22	34	30	33	24	31	30	29	24	28	24	24	30	0
42	(Japan) Masaki Baba							26	22							0
43	(Japan) Hideki Hirota									22	Ret					0
44	(Japan) Ryo Komikado							28	23							0
45	(Japan) Yasushi Ide					29	23									0
46	(Japan) Ryunosuke Shibata							24	27							0
47	(Japan) "Yugo"	25	26	32	Ret	34	27	33	32	33	27	30	29	25	31	0
48	(Japan) "Don Luciano"									32	25					0
49	(Japan) "Ryo"					25	Ret									0
50	(Japan) Hironori Kikuchi			31	27											0
51	(Japan) Mitsuji Inagaki									27	Ret					0
52	(Japan) Masakatsu Takatsu							32	31							0
53	(Japan) Yoshifumi Shigemori											31	Ret			0
—	(Japan) Kaito Tsukada											Ret	Ret			0
Pos	Driver	OKA		FUJ1		SUZ		FUJ2		AUT		SUG		MOT		Points

Colour	Result
Gold	Winner
Silver	Second place
Bronze	Third place
Green	Points classification
Blue	Non-points classification
Blue	Non-classified finish (NC)
Purple	Retired, not classified (Ret)
Red	Did not qualify (DNQ)
Red	Did not pre-qualify (DNPQ)
Black	Disqualified (DSQ)
White	Did not start (DNS)
White	Withdrew (WD)
White	Race cancelled (C)
Blank	Did not practice (DNP)
Blank	Did not arrive (DNA)
Blank	Excluded (EX)

**Bold** – Pole
Italics – Fastest Lap
† — Did not finish, but classified

=== Independent Cup ===
Pos	Driver	OKA		FUJ1		SUZ		FUJ2		AUT		SUG		MOT		Points
1	(Japan) Sergeyevich Sato	12	15	21	25	19	17	20	21	21	18	17	19	17	32	241
2	(Japan) "Dragon"	11	14	19	24			15	35	20	23	24	17	Ret	17	182
3	(Japan) Keizi Nakao	27	13	18	Ret	27	21	17	29	19	28	22	28	18	19	171
4	(Japan) Makio Saito	23	Ret	24	19	22	18	21	34	24	22	23	20	23	26	147
5	(Japan) "Ikari"	19	17	25	24	21	15			23	20	25	32	27	23	134
6	(Japan) Makoto Hotta	18	21	29	22	24	20	19	24	28	29	26	21	22	27	126
7	(Japan) Yuichi Sasaki			26	20			22	25			19	18	19	21	112
8	(Japan) Hachiro Osaka	24	19	27	Ret	26	22	25	28	25	30	29	22	21	20	92
9	(Japan) Motoyoshi Yoshida	21	18	28	29	32	26	30	26	26	Ret	27	26	Ret	28	56
10	(Japan) Masayoshi Oyama	22	22	34	30	33	24	31	30	29	24	28	24	24	30	49
11	(Japan) "Syuji"	26	25	30	21	31	25	27	33	30	26	Ret	25	26	29	43
12	(Japan) "Yugo"	25	26	32	Ret	34	27	33	32	33	27	30	29	25	31	15
13	(Japan) Hideki Hirota									22	Ret					12
14	(Japan) "Ryo"					25	Ret									10
15	(Japan) Yasushi Ide					29	23									10
16	(Japan) "Don Luciano"									32	25					8
17	(Japan) Hironori Kikuchi			31	27											4
18	(Japan) Mitsuji Inagaki									27	Ret					2

=== Teams' standings ===
Pos	Team	Pts.
1	Honda Formula Dream Project	350
2	Media Do Kageyama Racing	137
3	TOM'S Spirit	134
4	Le Beausset Motorsports	131
5	OTG Motor Sports	128
6	Silver Star Racing	69
7	Saccess Racing	65
8	Bionic Jack Racing	35
9	Skill Speed	17
10	Zap Speed	12
11	Ateam Buzz Motorsport	9
12	Rn-sports	1
