= The Battle Cats =

2012 video game

- Developers: PONOS Corporation; Tose (Switch)
- Publishers: PONOS Corporation; Bandai Namco Entertainment (Switch)
- Platforms: iOS; Android; Nintendo 3DS; Switch; Windows
- Release: 15 November 2012: iOS, Android; JP: 15 November 2012; KR: 27 June 2014; WW: 17 September 2014; TW/HK: 21 July 2015 Nintendo 3DS 26 June 2016 Windows August 2017 Switch; JP: 20 December 2018; SEA: 9 December 2021
- Genre: Tower defense

The Battle Cats (Note: Japanese: にゃんこ大戦争, Hepburn: Nyanko Daisensou) is a free-to-play tower defense video game developed and published by Japanese developer PONOS Corporation for iOS and Android, originally released in Japan under the name Nyanko Great War (にゃんこ大戦争, Nyanko Dai Sensō). The Battle Cats debuted on the Japanese iOS App Store in November 2012 under the name Battle Cats, with Android support following in December of that same year, and became popular in both Japan and Korea. It later was deleted from both the US Google Play stores and App Store, with an improved version released on 17 September 2014. A Microsoft Windows port was released in August 2017, and was available for download until late 2018, when PONOS Corporation ended support for it. It was ported to the Nintendo 3DS in 2016 and Nintendo Switch in Japan in 2018 and also Southeast Asia in 2021.

== Plot ==
The plot of The Battle Cats takes place across four main story sagas, three subchapter sagas in the Legends Stages, and various miscellaneous stages. Dialogue in the form of scrolling text before and after the completion of Chapters, unit and enemy descriptions, and battles during gameplay provide most of the game's lore and story.

=== Story Chapters ===
There are four sagas, with the first three "Empire of Cats", "Into the Future", and "Cats of the Cosmos" having three chapters each, while the fourth saga "The Aku Realms" having only one. There are ten chapters in total, but with the first three sagas, each chapter is essentially a harder version of the previous one. They contain the same levels, theme, and treasures (inferior, normal, and superior) across all three chapters, with the only difference being the amount, difficulty, and selection of enemies that appear in levels (other than in Empire of Cats). Additionally, the opening and ending monologue to each saga is reused across them.

==== Empire of Cats ====
The story begins in the first saga, "Empire of Cats" (EoC), where the Cat army travels the world to conquer its nations, with the Japanese version instead having them take over Japan. In EoC, there are three chapters (each containing 48 stages) of progressing difficulty, with identical stage design unlike the next sagas. Their inferred creator is the fictional deity, The Cat God, who can be unlocked early on as a power-up and as a usable unit upon further progression. Throughout the saga, the Cat army recruits special Legend units, who are similar to the mythical "The Heroes of Legend"; ancient warriors who wielded immense power. After conquering Earth, the Cats end resistance to their rule by conquering the Moon (Iriomote Island in the Japanese version) and obtaining a time machine.

==== Into the Future ====
The second main story saga, Into the Future (shortened to ItF), begins after the Cats use the time machine they obtained at the end of Empire of Cats, transporting them to the year 29XX, where Aliens have conquered Earth. The cats reclaim earth; both in the international and Japanese version. However, some stages are replaced by fictional locations like the Floating Continent and Great Abyss, and battle new enemies to reconquer the world. After driving the aliens off the planet, the Cats arrive on the Moon, as they had during Empire of Cats. However, this time they face corrupted versions of the Mythic units (except for the first chapter, which has Cli-One, an alien sea angel) they recruited during Empire of Cats. After defeating them, the Mythic units unlock their true forms, gaining more powers and abilities. The saga ends with the Cat army deciding to build a rocket to venture further into space and continue the fight against the aliens.

==== Cats of the Cosmos ====
The third main saga, Cats of the Cosmos (abbreviated as CotC), begins with the Cats invading the cosmos, presumably using the rocket they built at the end of Into the Future. However, the Aliens out in space are unlike those on Earth, as their power is enhanced with stars and they can warp Cat units away and nullify damage with barriers. The Cats battle across the Solar System and venture further into the galaxy, eventually arriving at the "Big Bang", where they fight the Cat God. After defeating him, he reveals he was the narrator throughout the saga and that, despite being an ancient deity, he is actually around twenty years old. After the cat and Alien forces come to a pseudo-ceasefire, the Cat God declares the cats should move onward to the Realm of Legends. However, an entity of chaos and destruction known as Filibuster Obstructa arrives from outside the galaxy, serving as the Cat Army's final test in their conquest of the Cosmos. (BBC)

==== The Aku Realms ====
The last main saga, The Aku Realms, takes place some time after Cats of the Cosmos. Its story begins with a Cat leader, Empress Cat, conducting research on the mysterious Aku kind, who are connected to altars that weaken the Cat Army's power. With help from the Cat Aku Researcher, she manages to open a portal to the Aku Realms, but the Aku's power possesses her and she becomes the Possessed Empress. Upon entering the Aku Realms, the Cats find more altars that weaken them, which the dark priest Mamon built to prevent others from interfering with his plan. He seeks to unleash Jagando, the Lord of Ruin, by undoing the seals of power the heroes of legend placed on him. With their power limited, the Cats fight across the Aku Realms to destroy the altars and regain their strength.

Upon reaching Norway and destroying half of the altars, the Cats arrive at "Mount Aku", where Dark Priest Mamon attacks them and they face him with half their strength. The Cats prevail and force Mamon to retreat, but he flees with the crystal of awakening; the last component needed to awaken Jagando. The Cats finish destroying the altars on Earth and travel to the Moon to destroy the last altar and confront High Priest Mamon. With Mamon's defeat, the last altar is seized and the Cats' power is almost fully restored. However, Mamon succeeds in reawakening Jagando, and with him holding the last of the Cats' power, they go back to Mount Aku to face him. They defeat and seal away Jagando once more and take his egg to raise as their own.

With the Cats' triumph, the Aku Altars are universally deactivated, allowing them to venture into areas they had been previously obstructed from. With his plans foiled and his army in shambles, Mamon loses motivation to continue his plans. However, this allows him to refocus his mind on his family, whom he reunites with for the first time in nearly a decade. He thanks the Battle Cats for giving him an opportunity to change his ways, but leaves them with a menacing message: "We'll surely meet again, Battle Cats. Just you wait..."

=== Legend Stages ===
Legend Stages are stages that supplement the main story of Battle Cats. It begins with the Cats using the time machine they obtained at the end of Empire of Cats to travel twenty years into the past, prior to the Cat God's birth/creation. These stages are split into two main groups: Event Stages and Sub-Chapter sagas. While all Sub-Chapter sagas are canon to the story of Battle Cats, some Event stages, such as collaboration stages, are not. While all Legend stages take place after the first chapter of Empire of Cats, where they fit within the greater story and timeline is ambiguous.

==== Stories of Legend ====
Stories of Legend (often shortened to SoL), is the first of the Sub-Chapter sagas and has 49 sub-chapters, with 1-8 stages in each one.They fight new and old enemies as they aim to collect Cat Food and recruit Mythic units to join their army, who resemble the Heroes of Legend. After the Cats accomplish their goals, they travel back to the present; however, upon emerging from the time machine, they find themselves in an unfamiliar place.

==== Uncanny Legends ====
Uncanny Legends (often shortened to UL) is the second of the Sub-Chapter Sagas and takes place after Stories of Legend and Cats of the Cosmos. After defeating and recruiting Mecha-Bun, the final boss of Stories of Legend, the Cats' time machine brings them to an ancient world, where Relic enemies, who have the ability to Curse their opponents, have not yet gone extinct. The Cats soon realize that some of the Mythic units recruited during Stories of Legend are descendants of the true Heroes of Legend. Like before, the Cat Army defeats and recruits these ancient Mythic units into their army. During their journey, the Cats also find "a dark guild researching forbidden knowledge" and "the REAL ultimate superweapon". The former likely refers to the Aku, but it is unknown what the latter refers to. Near the end of the saga, the Cats begin a project to "Catify" all of humanity and come across the ancient Sacred Tree, whose guardian is Zero Luza, the ancestor of humanity. After defeating him, a God emerges from the tree and tells the Cats to find a sage in another world while drawing a can of Cat Food in the sky. The Cats, with a new journey ahead of them, venture into a new world.

==== Zero Legends ====
Zero Legends (often shortened to ZL) is the third and final Sub-Chapter saga and features bosses previously exclusive to Advent Stages. After travelling through a spacetime distortion to the "other world", the Cats find themselves in an alternate universe at its Big Bang and face Metafilibuster, the original version of Filibuster Obstructa before the cats weakened him, leaving him as the Filibuster Obstructa the cats faced in Cats of the Cosmos. After emerging victorious, the Cats soon find that the laws of this universe are drastically different from their own, with natural phenomena such as snow in volcanoes and forests filled with poisonous gas. As well, enemies that are individuals in their world are commonplace here, and a new type of enemies, the mysterious Sage enemies, appear. After a few sub-chapters, 9 to be precise, the cats face the first Zero Legends boss, Sage of Mind Soractes, face the next one, Master of Logic Newton, 11 subchapters later, and Master of Selection Darvin in the 31st sub-chapter.

The current newest sub-chapters for Zero Legends are:

- EN: Yandere Chemistry (ZL-35)
- BCJP: Hen'ai Kagaku Jikkenjō, Favoritism Chemical Test Site (ZL-35)

== Gameplay ==
English screenshot from The Battle Cats gameplay on iOS

The Battle Cats is a tower defense game where the player selects a team of unlockable "Cats" and sends them onto a 2D battlefield to defend the Cat Base and defeat the enemy base. These enemies can have traits such as "Red", "Floating", "Dark", "Metal", "Angel", "Alien", "Zombie", "Aku", "Relic" and "Traitless". There are also "Subtraits" that the enemies may have such as "Behemoth", "Colossus", and "Sage".

In battle, each Cat and enemy unit has different stats and abilities, which gives units different roles on the battlefield, for example meat shield, crowd controller, or backliner. Along with base stats, a unit can also have abilities, which can improve their performance against a specific type of enemy or gives them a unique ability that can aid them in battle. For example, the Cat "Axe Cat" is strong against the "Red" enemy type, meaning it deals more and takes less damage against "Red" enemies.

The Cats are the protagonists that the player deploys throughout the game. Many Cats do not resemble typical cats, and are sometimes equipped with external objects such as weapons or machines, or are characters earned through collaboration events. A player can spend XP and "Catseyes", resources obtained by completing levels, to upgrade a Cat, as well as NP (Nyanko Points) to obtain and upgrade Talents, which give additional abilities. Version 12.1 added Ultra Talents, allowing certain Uber Rare Cats to unlock one to three additional Talents and equip a second Talent Orb after reaching level 60. Cats have level caps, or maximum levels, which differ across Cat units, ranging from as high as 60 to as low as 20 (or 1 for certain collab and event units). Some Cats can evolve into a True Form after being leveled up to their evolved form, which requires Catfruit or Catfruit Seeds; these are obtained from special stages or from merging Seeds into Fruit. Some Cats require Behemoth Stones or Behemoth Gems to reach their True Form, which can be obtained from Behemoth Culling stages or Enigma Stages. The 13.0 update adds the ability for some Uber Rare Cats to evolve into Ultra Forms after reaching level 60, after spending Behemoth Stones or Gems, Catfruit, and XP. Duplicates obtained in the game's Gacha systems can be used to add additional "plus-levels" to a Cat unit. The Cats are divided into six rarities, which are in increasing rarity: Normal, Special, Rare, Super Rare, Uber Super Rare (commonly shortened to Uber Rare or just Uber), and Legend Rare.

The Battle Cats contains three main stories: Empire of Cats (EoC), Into the Future (ItF), and Cats of the Cosmos (CotC), with each story containing three chapters, and an extra story, the Aku Realms. In addition, there are the Legend Stages, which are extra and less linear stages that supplement the main sagas. There are also two additional areas known as the Catclaw Dojo and the Underground Labyrinth, which are bonus areas designed to challenge the player in unique ways.

The Legend Stages are further divided into three main categories: Stories of Legend (SoL), Uncanny Legends (UL), and Zero Legends (ZL), with each being unlocked after completing the previous. There is also an additional category for event and Collaboration stages.

The Catclaw Dojo contains a stage to test how many enemies the player can defeat within a given period of time. This challenge is amplified by the money being scarce, as the enemies don't drop money when killed, forcing the player to send out units strategically and save their money. The Dojo house two types of stages, those being ranked stages and the Catclaw Championships. Ranked stages are typically levels in which the player competes against other players to defeat the most enemies as quickly as possible. At the end of the event, a reward is given out to each participant based on their performance compared to other players. These stages can be event or collaboration stages that refresh regularly, allowing rewards to be fought for again. The Catclaw Championship acts as a pseudo tutorial for the game, where players are shown how aspects such as traits and abilities function. These stages often start with levels that require the use of set cats to help teach aspect of the game, and end with tough levels designed to test players technical abilities. Upon completing a set of stages a player is given a rank. These ranks range from rank 1 up to rank 12, and are shown on the players' Officers' Club ID. It is recommended a player complete these stages when possible as these levels contain some of the best rewards in the game, including multiple Platinum tickets, special gacha capsules that have a guaranteed chance of giving the player an Uber Rare Cat.

The Underground Labyrinth is a collection of 100 stages with an unknown schedule that reward the player with rare items like Dark Catseyes. Despite the early stages being relatively easy, the challenge comes from the restrictions placed on the unit selection. In the Labyrinth, if a unit is used, it cannot be removed from the Equip menu. The only way to remove a unit from the player's lineup is for the unit to become "trapped". After defeating or losing a level, units can become trapped and are unusable, but the player can be given the choice to "rescue" a unit from being trapped, allowing them to still be usable. However, the traps are unpredictable, since they vary in how many units they trap and sometimes do not allow the player to rescue units. The Labyrinth forces players to ration their units carefully and use different units, adding a unique challenge seen nowhere else in the game.

While there is no reason to assume not, it is inconclusive whether or not the events that take place in the Catclaw Dojo and the Underground Labyrinth are canon to the story of The Battle Cats.

=== Gacha system ===
Cat Capsules, often referred to as gacha, is an area where the player can spend Cat Tickets, Rare Cat Tickets, Lucky Tickets, and Cat Food to obtain Cat Units and Ability Capsules. The rewards earned are then either used to add a "plus-level" to a Cat, exchanged for NP or XP, saved in the Cat Storage to be used later, or exchanged for a Rare Ticket. While many cats can be obtained outside of gacha, some Rare and Super Rare Cats as well as Uber Super Rare and Legend Rare Cats are exclusive to it.

== Development ==
Logo of PONOS Corporation

Developer PONOS Corporation was founded in 1990 in Kyoto as an image processing company, later moving to game development on mobile platforms as a side venture. Due to the game's unexpected success, they invested in and became a partner of the Williams F1 team for the 2020 Formula One World Championship and the 2021 Formula One World Championship.

== Console ports ==
=== The Battle Cats POP! ===
The Battle Cats POP! reviews

Review scores
Publication	Score
Destructoid	7/10
Nintendo Life	7/10
Digitally Downloaded	3.5/5

The Battle Cats POP! (often abbreviated to BCP) was released for the Nintendo 3DS on the Nintendo eShop in Japan on 31 May 2015, and worldwide on 27 June 2016. The game features mechanics similar to The Battle Cats, but also introduces a two-player VS mode and made use of the 3DS's 3D capabilities.

==== Reception ====
The Battle Cats POP! received average reviews. CJ Andriessen of Destructoid gave the game a 7 out of 10 and wrote that "The Battle Cats POP! is a game that's as fun as it is weird. When it's not putting you in time out with the energy meter, it can be addictive like Pokémon. Too much of its free-to-play roots are still present, but even with these elements, it's still a worthwhile time killer." Matt S. of Digitally Downloaded gave 3.5 stars out of 5 and noted "what sets Battle Cats apart from the many similar games of similar depth and strategy is that hugely creative edge. This game is the distinctive and memorable example of the genre, because the artists had the sense to do something that makes no sense, but we end up looking forward to each new level just to see the insanity that it brings." However, the stamina system was criticized by reviewers, as Louisa Bhairam with Nintendo Life stated "It's a bit of an odd system for a game which requires no micro-transactions ... It's a feature which should have been removed entirely for the 3DS version."

=== The Battle Cats Unite! ===
The Battle Cats Unite! was released for the Nintendo Switch by Bandai Namco Entertainment in Japan and Southeast Asia on 9 December 2021. The game is a revamped port of The Battle Cats, with a new two-player co-op mode and many minigames exclusive to this version. Tose developed this version of the game.

== Spinoffs ==
=== Battle Cats Rangers ===
Battle Cats Rangers, an idle/clicker game published by MEMORY Inc and developed with YD Online Corp, was released for Android and iOS devices on 27 April 2017. In Battle Cats Rangers, players tap the screen as quickly as possible to attack incoming enemies and bosses that swarm their team of Cats. Two weeks prior to release, a pre-registration campaign was announced which encouraged users to sign up for in-game currency. By using coins and cat food, the in-game currency, players can level up their Cats to deal more damage and progress through the game. Over time, players can add more Cats to their team and encounter stronger enemies they have to defeat. After two years, the game shut down its online servers on 29 March 2019 and could no longer be played.

=== Go! Go! Pogo Cat ===
Five years after the release of The Battle Cats, PONOS Corp released Go! Go! Pogo Cat, a simple infinite platformer similar to Flappy Bird. The player directs a Cat riding a pogo stick to gain as much distance as possible, collecting items like gems. Players that have The Battle Cats downloaded can complete certain missions in-game for rewards redeemable in The Battle Cats.

=== The Burgle Cats ===
On 23 February 2021, PONOS Corp announced and released The Burgle Cats, a game where the player gathers a crew of Cats to try and steal from other players' manors while evading various obstacles such as traps and guards. The player can also defend and fortify their own manor to ward off other crews and protect their treasure. On December 22nd, 2025, the game's servers were shuttled down and it became unplayable.

=== Battle Cats Quest ===
On 13 November 2021, PONOS Corp released Battle Cats Quest. In this game, players roll a spherical Cat on land to knock off enemies from various stages and earn coins. Similar to Go! Go! Pogo Cat, players can complete in-game missions for rewards redeemable in The Battle Cats.

=== Let's Go Mightycat! ===
A puzzle video game spin-off, Let's Go Mightycat!, was developed by PONOS for iOS, macOS and tvOS as an Apple Arcade exclusive to be released on 7 August 2025. Players control a superhero cat who directly destroys enemy structures in deviation from the original game's tower defense gameplay.
