= Atsushi Miyake =

Japanese racing driver

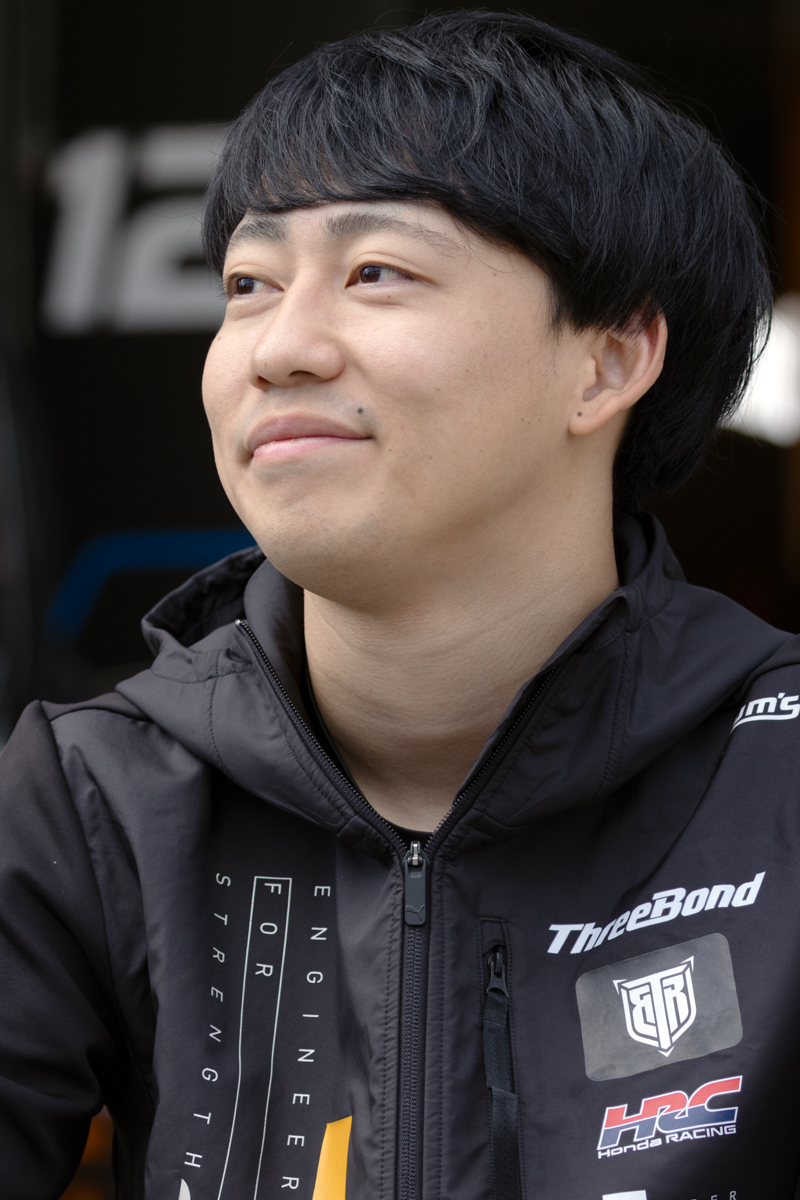
- Miyake at Suzuka Circuit in November 2025
- Nationality: (Japan) Japanese
- Born: 17 March 1999 (age 27) Ise, Mie, Japan

Super GT career
- Debut season: 2020
- Current team: Kondo Racing
- Categorisation: FIA Silver (until 2026); FIA Gold (2027–)
- Car number: 24
- Former teams: Nismo NDDP
- Starts: 16
- Wins: 1
- Podiums: 3
- Poles: 1
- Fastest laps: 1
- Best finish: 3rd in 2024

Super Formula career
- Debut season: 2022
- Former teams: ThreeBond Racing, Team Goh
- Starts: 31
- Wins: 0
- Podiums: 1
- Poles: 0
- Fastest laps: 1
- Best finish: 14th in 2022

Previous series
- 2020–2023 2021 2018–19: Super GT - GT300; Super Formula Lights; F4 Japanese Championship

Atsushi Miyake (三宅淳詞, Miyake Atsushi; born 17 March 1999) is a Japanese racing driver currently competing in the Super GT Series for Kondo Racing. He has been competing full-time in the Super GT, first for Max Racing between 2020 and 2023, then switching to Nismo Racing for 2024 and 2025. Miyake previously raced in the Super Formula Championship for ThreeBond Racing in 2025 and 2024, and for Team Goh in the 2022 season.

== Career ==
=== Early career ===
Miyake was the winner of the SRS-F (Suzuka Circuit Racing School Formula) Scholarship in 2018. He made his professional racing debut later that year, in the final round of the FIA F4 Japanese Championship. In 2019, he competed full-time in Japanese F4 as a member of the Honda Formula Dream Project. Miyake won the second race of the season at Okayama, and went on to finish as runner-up in the championship behind fellow Honda junior Ren Sato.

After a one-year hiatus to racing in Super GT, Miyake returned to single-seater racing in the 2021 Super Formula Lights Championship, driving with Rn-sports. He won two races and scored five podiums, finishing fourth place in the standings.

=== Super GT ===
==== GT300 ====
Miyake stepped up to the GT300 class of Super GT in 2020, driving for series newcomers Max Racing in their Lexus RC F GT3. Miyake stayed with the team for 2021, as they changed vehicles to the GT300 spec Toyota GR Supra. Miyake won his first Super GT race at Suzuka Circuit in August, and, alongside co-driver Yuui Tsutsumi, finished fifth in the GT300 drivers' championship. He continued with Max Racing for 2022, partnered with veteran Kimiya Satō, but would only score one point throughout the season.

Miyake's 2023 campaign began strongly with a podium at the opening round at Okayama, but his season ended early when his team, Max Racing, was forced to withdraw from Super GT and cease operations after their Toyota GR Supra GT was destroyed in a vehicle fire at the fourth round at Fuji.

==== GT500 ====
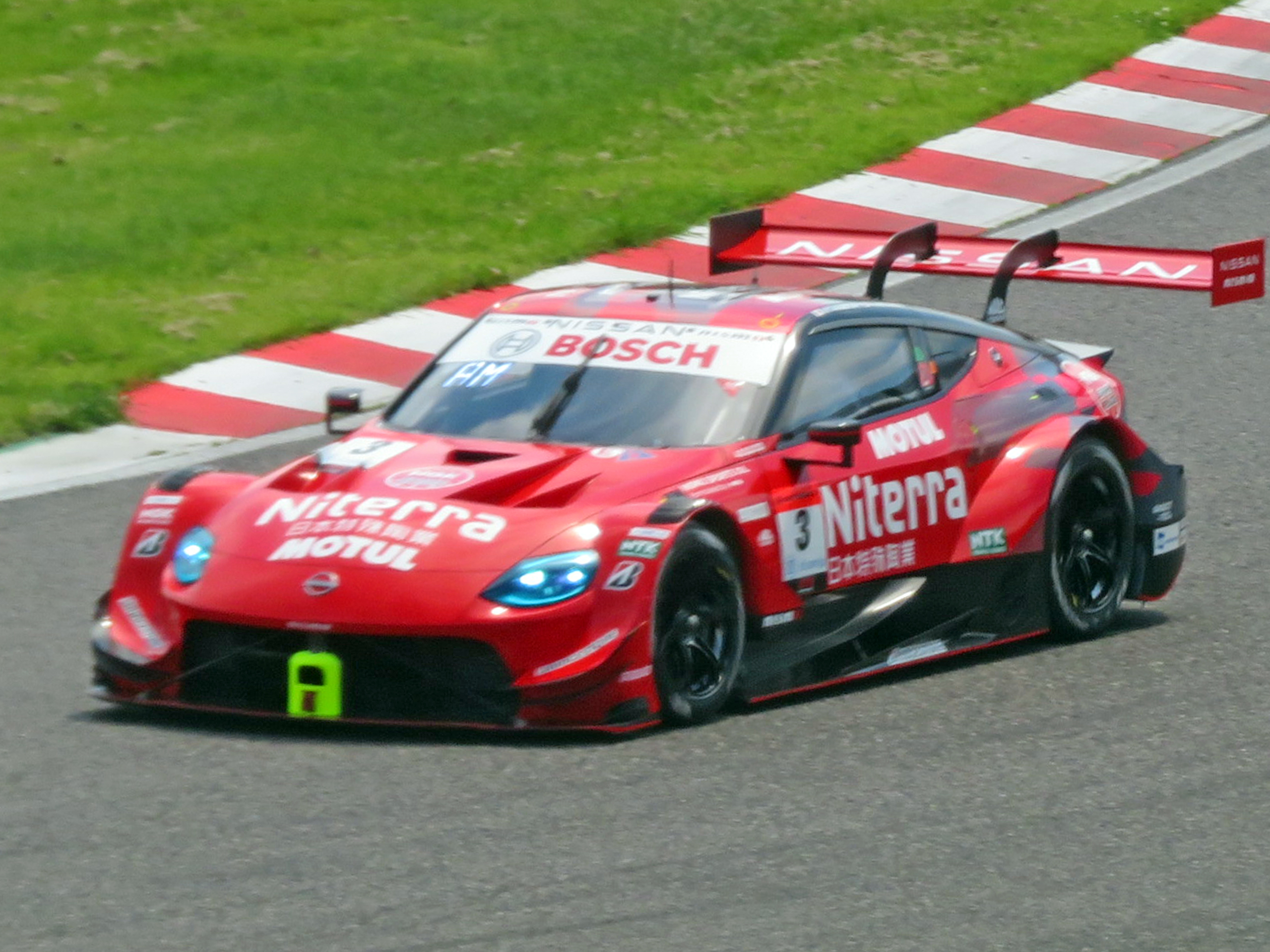
Miyake at Suzuka Circuit in 2024

In 2024, Miyake stepped up to GT500 Class with Nissan., where he would race with NISMO NDDP team, as he partnered with Mitsunori Takaboshi. In the second race of the season, Round 2 at Fuji, they achieved their first victory. NISMO's No. 23 car came in second, resulting in a 1-2 finish. They then went on to finish third in Round 6 at Autopolis, securing third place in the series, the highest ranking for a Nissan team that year.

In 2025, with Takboshi moving to car No. 23, Daiki Sasaki, who had competed in the GT300 class the previous year, returned to the GT500 class and became his partner. In contrast to the previous year, they struggled, and their best result was a third-place finish at Round 6 in Suzuka, where they achieved their first podium of the season with a 1-3 finish alongside NISMO, who secured Nissan's first victory of the season. They finished the season in 12th place in the series standings.

In 2026, as Nissan downsized its team and consolidated NISMO into a single car (car number 23), Teppei Natori moved to Kondo Racing, succeeding Tsugio Matsuda, who had ended his Super GT participation at the end of the previous year and become the team manager for car number 23. He formed a young partnership with Teppei Natori. Also from this year, Kondo Racing switched from Yokohama tires, which they had used until the previous year, to Bridgestone tires.

=== Super Formula ===
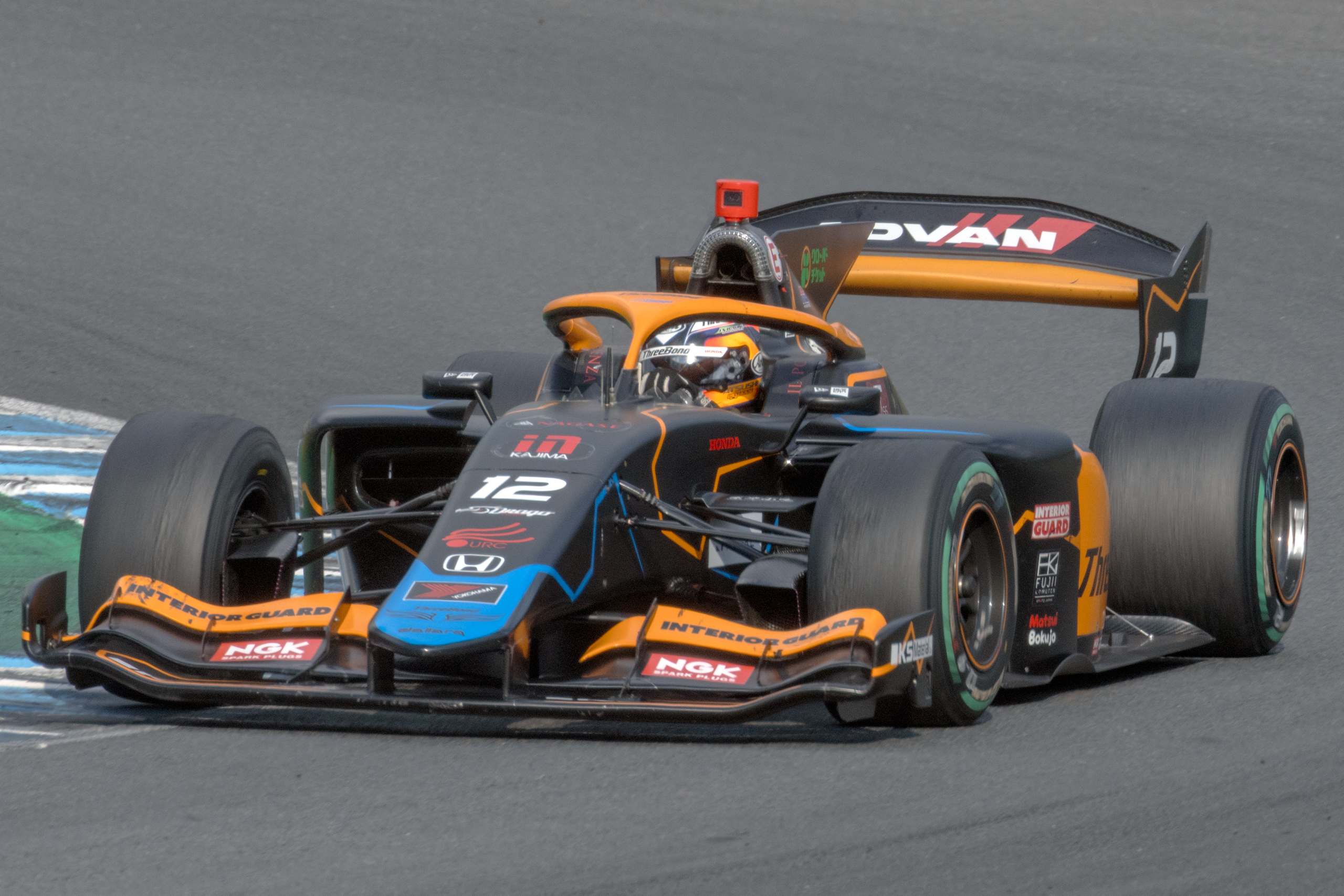
Miyake at Mobility Resort Motegi in 2024

Following the conclusion of his Super Formula Lights campaign, Miyake tested a Super Formula car for the first time at the end-of-season test in December 2021, driving with KCMG. On 7 February 2022, Miyake stepped up to Super Formula, joining newcomers Team Goh alongside Ren Satō. He impressed in the early half of the season, scoring points on debut and finishing on the podium at the fourth round at Autopolis, but would struggle for the rest of the season and only scored points once more at the final round at Suzuka. He finished the season fourteenth in the standings with 21 points, and was replaced by former Formula 2 driver Cem Bölükbaşı for the 2023 season.

In January 2024, Miyake was announced to be returning to Super Formula for the 2024 season, taking the place of Toyota-bound Nirei Fukuzumi at ThreeBond Racing.

== Racing record ==
=== Career summary ===
| Season | Series | Team | Races | Wins | Poles | FLaps | Podiums | Points | Position |
|---|---|---|---|---|---|---|---|---|---|
| 2018 | F4 Japanese Championship | Eagle Sports | 2 | 0 | 0 | 0 | 0 | 0 | 24th |
| 2019 | F4 Japanese Championship | Honda Formula Dream Project | 14 | 1 | 3 | 1 | 8 | 147 | **2nd** |
| 2020 | Super GT - GT300 | Max Racing | 8 | 0 | 0 | 0 | 0 | 0 | NC |
| 2020 | Super Taikyū - ST-3 | Max Racing | 5 | 0 | 0 | 1 | 2 | 72.5‡ | 4th‡ |
| 2021 | Super Formula Lights | Rn-sports | 17 | 2 | 0 | 1 | 5 | 57 | 4th |
| 2021 | Super GT - GT300 | Max Racing | 8 | 1 | 0 | 1 | 1 | 44 | 5th |
| 2021 | Super Taikyū - ST-3 | Max Racing | 6 | 1 | 0 | 0 | 4 | 104‡ | **2nd‡** |
| 2022 | Super GT - GT300 | Max Racing | 7 | 0 | 0 | 0 | 0 | 1 | 35th |
| 2022 | Super Taikyū - ST-Q | Max Racing | 6 | 1 | 0 | 0 | 6 | N/A | NC |
| 2022 | Super Formula | Team Goh | 10 | 0 | 0 | 1 | 1 | 21 | 14th |
| 2023 | Super GT - GT300 | Max Racing | 4 | 0 | 0 | 0 | 1 | 11 | 19th |
| 2023 | Super Taikyū - ST-3 | Okabe Jidosha Motorsports | 1 | 0 | 0 | 0 | 0 | 113‡ | 4th‡ |
| 2023 | GT World Challenge Asia - GT3 | CREF Motor Sport | 2 | 0 | 0 | 0 | 0 | 0 | NC |
| 2023 | Japan Cup Series - GT3 | CREF Motor Sport | 2 | 0 | 0 | 0 | 0 | 22 | 13th |
| 2023 | TGR GR86/BRZ Cup | 4MINUTES | 7 | 0 | 0 | 0 | 0 | 0 | NC |
| 2024 | Super GT - GT500 | NDDP NISMO | 8 | 1 | 0 | 1 | 2 | 54 | **3rd** |
| 2024 | Super Formula | ThreeBond Racing | 9 | 0 | 0 | 0 | 0 | 0 | 24th |
| 2024 | Super Taikyu - ST-Q | NISMO | 1 | 0 | 0 | 0 | 1 | 0 | NC |
| 2025 | Super GT - GT500 | NISMO NDDP | 8 | 0 | 1 | 0 | 1 | 24 | 12th |
| 2025 | Super Formula | ThreeBond Racing | 12 | 0 | 0 | 0 | 0 | 1 | 18th |
| 2025 | Super Taikyu - ST-3 | Okabe Jidosha Motorsport | 5 | 1 | 0 | 0 | 3 | 129 | **3rd‡** |
| 2025 | Super Taikyu - ST-Q | NISMO | 1 | 1 | 0 | 0 | 1 | 0 | NC |
| 2025 | Suzuka 1000 km | Team Handwork Challenge | 1 | 0 | 0 | 0 | 0 | N/A | DNF |
| 2026 | Super GT - GT500 | Kondo Racing | 8 | 0 | 0 | 1 | 0 | 20 | 13th |
| 2026 | GT World Challenge Asia | Team 5ZIGEN | 10 | 0 | 0 | 0 | 2 | 72 | 10th |
| 2026 | Suzuka 1000 km | Team 5ZIGEN | 1 | 0 | 0 | 0 | 0 | N/A | 19th |

^{*} Season still in progress.
‡ Team standings.

=== Complete F4 Japanese Championship results ===
(key) (Races in bold indicate pole position; races in italics indicate points for the fastest lap of top ten finishers)

| Year | Team | 1 | 2 | 3 | 4 | 5 | 6 | 7 | 8 | 9 | 10 | 11 | 12 | 13 | 14 | DC | Points |
|---|---|---|---|---|---|---|---|---|---|---|---|---|---|---|---|---|---|
| 2018 | Eagle Sports | OKA; 1 | OKA; 2 | FUJ1; 1 | FUJ1; 2 | SUZ; 1 | SUZ; 2 | FUJ2; 1 | FUJ2; 2 | SUG; 1 | SUG; 2 | AUT; 1 | AUT; 2 | MOT; 1; 11 | MOT; 2; 11 | 24th | 0 |
| 2019 | Honda Formula Dream Project | OKA; 1; 14 | OKA; 2; 1 | FUJ1; 1; 11 | FUJ1; 2; 10 | SUZ; 1; 3 | SUZ; 2; 3 | FUJ2; 1; 9 | FUJ2; 2 Ret | **AUT**; **1**; 2 | AUT; 2; 2 | **SUG**; **1**; 2 | **SUG**; **2**; 2 | MOT; 1; 9 | MOT; 2; 3 | 2nd | 147 |

=== Complete Super GT results ===
(key) (Races in bold indicate pole position; races in italics indicate fastest lap)

| Year | Team | Car | Class | 1 | 2 | 3 | 4 | 5 | 6 | 7 | 8 | 9 | DC | Points |
|---|---|---|---|---|---|---|---|---|---|---|---|---|---|---|
| 2020 | Max Racing | Lexus RC F GT3 | GT300 | FUJ; 16 | FUJ; 13 | SUZ; 20 | MOT; 26 | FUJ; 19 | SUZ | MOT; 15 | FUJ; 24 | | NC | 0 |
| 2021 | Max Racing | Toyota GR Supra GT | GT300 | OKA; 5 | FUJ; 11 | MOT; 5 | SUZ; 1 | SUG; 9 | AUT; 17 | MOT; 7 | FUJ; 7 | | 5th | 44 |
| 2022 | Max Racing | Toyota GR Supra GT | GT300 | OKA | FUJ; 19 | SUZ; 22 | FUJ; DNS | SUZ; Ret | SUG; 14 | AUT; 10 | MOT; 17 | | 35th | 1 |
| 2023 | Max Racing | Toyota GR Supra GT | GT300 | OKA; 3 | FUJ; 16 | SUZ; 16 | FUJ; Ret | SUZ | SUG | AUT | MOT | | 19th | 11 |
| 2024 | NISMO NDDP | Nissan Z NISMO GT500 | GT500 | OKA; 6 | FUJ; 1^{2} | SUZ; 8 | FUJ; 12 | SUZ; 7 | SUG; 6 | AUT; 3 | MOT; 7 | | 3rd | 54 |
| 2025 | NISMO NDDP | Nissan Z NISMO GT500 | GT500 | OKA; 10 | FUJ; 10 | SEP; 11 | FS1 (8) | FS2; 6 | SUZ; 3 | SUG; 12 | **AUT**; 7 | MOT; 9 | 12th | 24 |
| 2026 | Kondo Racing | Nissan Z NISMO GT500 | GT500 | OKA; 9 | FUJ; 6 | FUJ; 11 | SUZ; 7 | SUG; 7 | AUT; 11 | MOT; 9 | MOT; 8 | | 13th | 20 |

^{‡} Half points awarded as less than 75% of race distance was completed.
^{(Number)} Driver did not take part in this sprint race, points are still awarded for the teammate's result.
^{*} Season still in progress.

=== Complete Super Formula Lights results ===
(key) (Races in bold indicate pole position) (Races in italics indicate fastest lap)

| Year | Entrant | 1 | 2 | 3 | 4 | 5 | 6 | 7 | 8 | 9 | 10 | 11 | 12 | 13 | 14 | 15 | 16 | 17 | 18 | Pos | Points |
|---|---|---|---|---|---|---|---|---|---|---|---|---|---|---|---|---|---|---|---|---|---|
| 2021 | Rn-sports | FUJ; 1; 6 | FUJ; 2; 5 | FUJ; 3; 1 | SUZ; 1; 4 | SUZ; 2; 6 | SUZ; 3; 4 | AUT; 1; 1 | AUT; 2; 6 | AUT; 3 C | SUG; 1; 5 | SUG; 2; 5 | SUG; 3; 4 | MOT1; 1; 6 | MOT1; 2; 3 | MOT1; 3; 5 | MOT2; 1; 3 | MOT2; 2; 6 | MOT2; 3; 2 | 4th | 57 |

=== Complete Super Formula results ===
(key) (Races in bold indicate pole position) (Races in italics indicate fastest lap)

| Year | Team | Engine | 1 | 2 | 3 | 4 | 5 | 6 | 7 | 8 | 9 | 10 | 11 | 12 | DC | Points |
|---|---|---|---|---|---|---|---|---|---|---|---|---|---|---|---|---|
| 2022 | Team Goh | Honda | FUJ; 10 | FUJ; 5 | SUZ; Ret | AUT; 3 | SUG; 18 | FUJ; Ret | MOT; Ret | MOT; 15 | SUZ; 12 | SUZ; 8 | | | 14th | 21 |
| 2024 | ThreeBond Racing | Honda | SUZ; 14 | AUT; 17 | SUG; 15 | FUJ; 18 | MOT; 20 | FUJ; 14 | FUJ; Ret | SUZ; Ret | SUZ; 18 | | | | 24th | 0 |
| 2025 | ThreeBond Racing | Honda | SUZ; Ret | SUZ; 13 | MOT; 17 | MOT; 18 | AUT; 18 | FUJ; 21 | FUJ; NC | SUG; Ret | FUJ; 19 | SUZ; 10 | SUZ; 12 | SUZ; 16 | 18th | 1 |

^{*} Season still in progress.
