= Ponos Corporation =

Japanese video game developer

The PONOS Corporation is a Japanese video game developer and publisher mainly known for their free-to-play tower defense mobile game The Battle Cats.

It was founded in 1990 in Kyoto as an image processing company but pivoted to game development primarily for mobile phones. Their most popular game, The Battle Cats, was launched on the year of the company founder's death, in 2012. The company was inherited by his son, Yorikatsu Tsujiko who remains as the current CEO.

Under his leadership, the company started investing in professional auto racing, sponsoring Williams Racing and Red Bull Racing in the early 2020's. In 2021, Tsujiko founded PONOS Racing and began his career as a driver.
