= Takuya Otaki =

Japanese racing driver (born 1995)

- 大滝 拓也
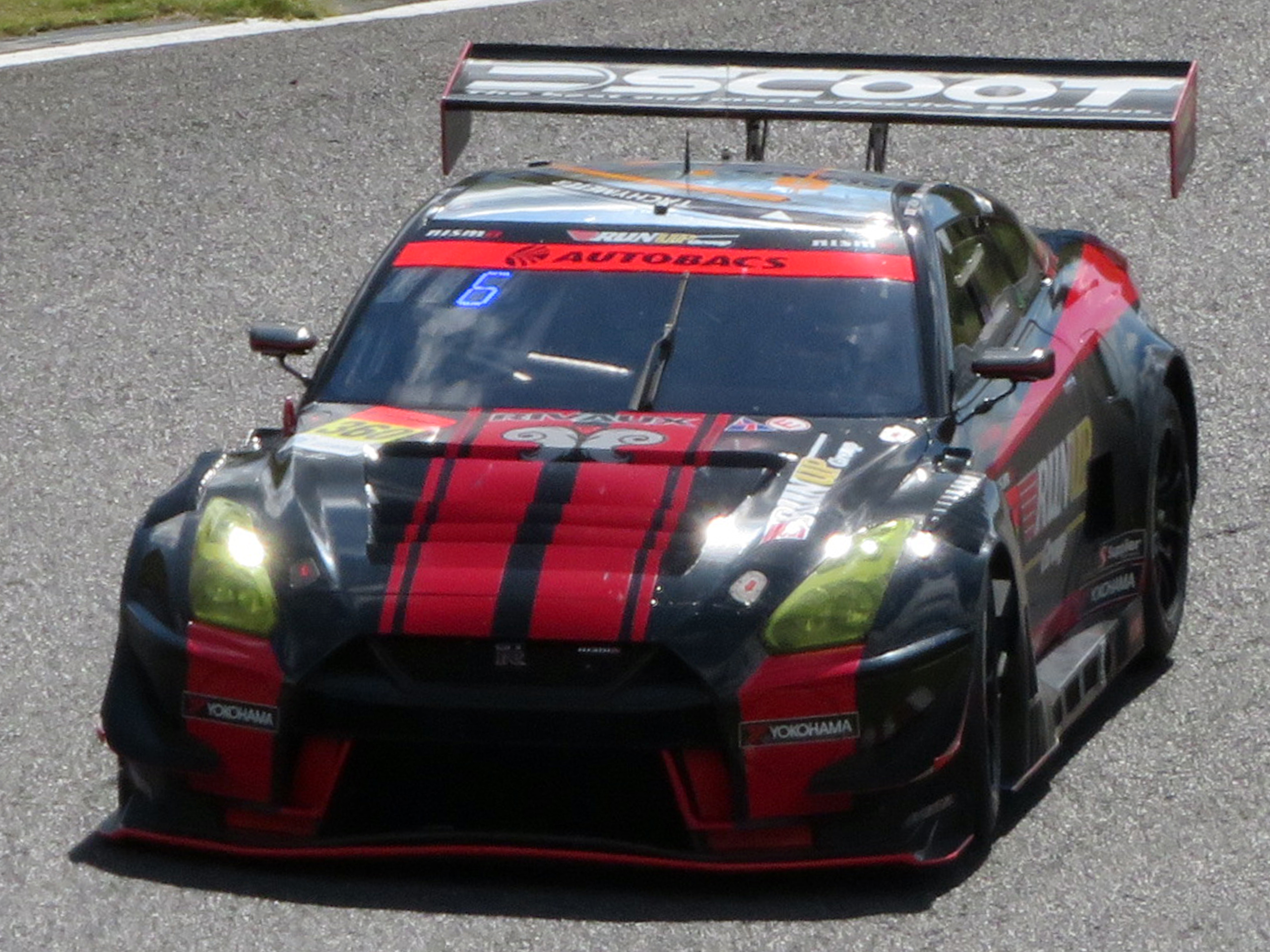
- Otaki in 2020
- Born: Takuya Otaki; 11 October 1995 (age 31); Yamagata Prefecture, Japan
- Nationality: (Japan) Japanese

Previous series
- 2020-2021, 2023-2024 2019 2016-2018, 2021-2022: Super GT GT300; Porsche Carrera Cup Japan; F4 Japanese Championship

Takuya Otaki (大滝 拓也, Ōtaki Takuya; born 11 October 1995) is a Japanese racing driver currently racing for B-Max Racing Team in Super Formula Lights.

== Career ==
After graduating from the Suzuka Racing School in late 2015, Otaki made his single-seater debut in 2016, racing in the F4 Japanese Championship for Honda Formula Dream Project. He stayed with them for three seasons, winning at Suzuka in 2016, and at Sugo in 2017 as he had a best points finish of fifth in the latter, before ending his three-year tenure in the series winless and eighth in points.

Otaki then competed in Porsche Carrera Cup Japan in 2019, before making his Super GT debut with Tomei Sports the following year after passing his rookie test ahead of his debut at Suzuka. With them, Otaki made two starts that year, taking a surprise podium in the latter at Motegi by finishing third. During 2020, Otaki also made a one-off appearance for Team 5Zigen in the ST-Z class of Super Taikyu at Autopolis.

The following year, Otaki returned to Japanese F4, racing on a part-time basis with Media Do Kageyama Racing, taking three points finished with a best result of eighth at Motegi. Also in 2021, Otaki made one-off appearances in Super GT and Super Taikyu for Tomei Sports and Tracy Sports with Delta, respectively.

In 2022, Otaki remained with Media Do Kageyama Racing in F4 Japanese Championship, taking a best result of seventh twice at Suzuka and Autopolis. Alongside his commitments in Japanese F4, Otaki was retained by Tracy Sports with Delta for their ST-3 program in Super Taikyu. Taking part in the first four races, Otaki won at Sportsland Sugo and finished second in the other three, helping the team secure the ST-3 title at season's end.

Otaki returned to GT300 competition in 2023, returning to Tomei Sports as their third driver. Despite being their 'C' driver, Otaki competed in all but two races, taking a best result of 14th four times but wasn't classified in the official standings as he didn't score points. The following year, Otaki returned to Tomei Sports for his second full-time season in GT300. Racing in all but one rounds, Otaki scored a best result of 12th at Sportsland SUGO. During 2024, Otaki also won the Fuji 24 Hours in the ST-3 class.

Starting off 2025 with a class win at the Fuji 24 Hours in ST-3, Otaki was set to race in the Suzuka 1000 km for RunUp Sports as well as making his debut in Super Formula Lights for B-Max Racing Team, until he withdrew from both.

== Karting record ==
=== Karting career summary ===
Season	Series	Team	Position
2011	Kart Soleil Mogamigawa – MAX		1st
2011	SL Kart Meeting Sugo Series – MAX		2nd
2011	Rotax Max Japan Festival – Senior	FIRST Racing KD	30th
2012	Toyota SL Kart Meeting Sugo Series – MAX	FIRST Racing KD	1st
2012	Rotax Max Japan Festival – Senior	FIRST Racing KD	19th
2013	SL Kart Meeting Sugo Series – MAX		2nd
2016	SL Kart Meeting Sugo Series – MAX	FIRST Racing MTS	
2023	SL Kart Meeting Sugo Series – MAX	FIRST Racing MTS	

== Racing record ==
=== Racing career summary ===
Season	Series	Team	Races	Wins	Poles	F/Laps	Podiums	Points	Position
2016	F4 Japanese Championship	Honda Formula Dream Project	14	1	1	0	1	55	12th
2017	F4 Japanese Championship	Honda Formula Dream Project	14	1	0	0	3	94	5th
2018	F4 Japanese Championship	Honda Formula Dream Project	13	0	0	0	1	57	8th
2019	Porsche Carrera Cup Japan	Sky Racing	10	0	0	0	3	127	4th
2019	Super Taikyu – ST-3	Tracy Sports	1	0	0	0	0	91‡	5th‡
2020	Super GT – GT300	Tomei Sports	2	0	0	0	1	11	19th
2020	Super Taikyu – ST-Z	Team 5Zigen	1	0	0	0	0	84‡	**3rd‡**
2021	F4 Japanese Championship	Media Do Kageyama Racing	9	0	0	0	0	7	13th
2021	Super GT – GT300	Tomei Sports	1	0	0	0	0	0	NC
2021	Super Taikyu – ST-3	Tracy Sports with Delta	1	0	0	0	1	74‡	6th‡
2022	F4 Japanese Championship	Media Do Kageyama Racing	14	0	0	0	0	18	13th
2022	Super Taikyu – ST-3	Tracy Sports with Delta	4	1	0	0	4	136.5‡	**1st‡**
2023	Super GT – GT300	Tomei Sports	6	0	0	0	0	0	NC
2024	Super GT – GT300	Tomei Sports	7	0	0	0	0	0	NC
2024	Super Taikyu – ST-3	Tracy Sports with Delta	1	1	0	0	1	142.5‡	**1st‡**
2025	Super Taikyu – ST-3	Tracy Sports with Delta	1	1	0	0	1	145‡	**1st‡**
2025	Super Formula Lights	B-Max Racing Team	0	0	0	0	0	0	NC

‡ Team standings

=== Complete F4 Japanese Championship results ===
(key) (Races in bold indicate pole position) (Races in italics indicate fastest lap)

Year	Team	1	2	3	4	5	6	7	8	9	10	11	12	13	14	DC	Pts
2016	Honda Formula Dream Project	OKA; 1 Ret	OKA; 2; 15	FUJ1; 1; 33	FUJ1; 2; 19	SUG; 1; 8	SUG; 2; 13	FUJ2; 1; 8	FUJ2; 2; 11	FUJ2; 3 Ret	**SUZ**; **1**; 1	SUZ; 2; 30	MOT; 1; 8	MOT; 2; 5	MOT; 3; 6	12th	55
2017	Honda Formula Dream Project	OKA; 1; 7	OKA; 2; 3	FUJ1; 1; 14	FUJ1; 2; 13	AUT; 1 Ret	AUT; 2; 12	SUG; 1; 2	SUG; 2; 1	FUJ2; 1; 6	FUJ2; 2; 9	SUZ; 1; 7	SUZ; 2; 8	MOT; 1; 7	MOT; 2; 8	5th	94
2018	Honda Formula Dream Project	OKA; 1; 19	OKA; 2 DNS	FUJ1; 1; 20	FUJ1; 2; 20	SUZ; 1; 16	SUZ; 2; 3	FUJ2; 1; 8	FUJ2; 2; 11	SUG; 1; 6	SUG; 2; 14	AUT; 1; 5	AUT; 2; 4	MOT; 1; 6	MOT; 2 Ret	8th	57
2021	Media Do Kageyama Racing	FUJ1; 1	FUJ1; 2	SUZ; 1; 14	SUZ; 2; 10	MOT1; 1	MOT1; 2	MOT1; 3	SUG; 1; 11	SUG; 2; 30†	SUG; 3; 9	MOT2; 1; 8	MOT2; 2; 13	FUJ2; 1 Ret	FUJ2; 2; 21	13th	7
2022	Media Do Kageyama Racing	FUJ1; 1; 12	FUJ1; 2; 36	SUZ1; 1; 7	SUZ1; 2; 10	FUJ2; 1; 8	FUJ2; 2; 14	SUZ2; 1; 10	SUZ2; 2; 12	SUG; 1 Ret	SUG; 2; 13	AUT; 1; 7	AUT; 2; 30	MOT; 1 Ret	MOT; 2; 17	13th	18

=== Complete Super GT results ===
Year	Team	Car	Class	1	2	3	4	5	6	7	8	DC	Pts
2020	Tomei Sports	Nissan GT-R Nismo GT3	GT300	FUJ	FUJ	SUZ	MOT	FUJ	SUZ; 17	MOT; 3	FUJ	19th	11
2021	Tomei Sports	Nissan GT-R Nismo GT3	GT300	OKA	FSW	MOT	SUZ	SUG	AUT	MOT; 13	FSW	NC	0
2023	Tomei Sports	Nissan GT-R Nismo GT3	GT300	OKA	FSW; 19	SUZ; 14	FSW; 14	SUZ; 14	SUG; 15	AUT; 14	MOT	NC	0
2024	Tomei Sports	Nissan GT-R Nismo GT3	GT300	OKA; 20	FUJ1; 21	SUZ1; 23	FUJ2; 17	SUG; 12	AUT; 21	MOT	SUZ2; 18	NC	0

=== Complete Super Formula Lights results ===
(key) (Races in bold indicate pole position) (Races in italics indicate fastest lap)

Year	Entrant	1	2	3	4	5	6	7	8	9	10	11	12	13	14	15	16	17	18	Pos	Points
2025	B-Max Racing Team	SUZ; 1	SUZ; 2	SUZ; 3	AUT; 1	AUT; 2	AUT; 3	OKA; 1	OKA; 2	OKA; 3	SUG; 1	SUG; 2	SUG; 3	FUJ; 1 WD	FUJ; 2 WD	FUJ; 3 WD	MOT; 1	MOT; 2	MOT; 3	NC	0

^{*} Season still in progress.
