= Yuya Hiraki =

Japanese racing driver (born 1996)

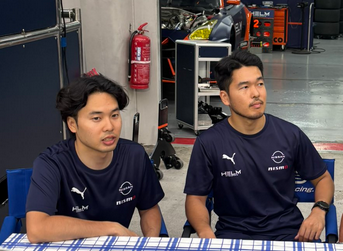
- Hiraki (left) at the 2025 Super GT Malaysia Festival
- Nationality: (Japan) Japanese
- Born: 25 June 1996 (age 30) Mito, Ibaraki, Japan

Super GT - GT300 career
- Debut season: 2018
- Current team: HELM Motorsports
- Car number: 62
- Former teams: Team Mach, NILZZ Racing
- Starts: 55
- Wins: 0
- Podiums: 2
- Poles: 0
- Fastest laps: 0
- Best finish: 14th in 2020

Previous series
- 2022 2022 2015-2017: Super Taikyu - ST-X; Super Formula Lights; F4 Japanese Championship

Championship titles
- 2022: Super Taikyu - ST-X

Yuya Hiraki (平木湧也, Hiraki Yūya; born 26 June 1996) is a Japanese racing driver currently competing in Super GT for HELM Motorsports.

== Career ==
=== Formula 4 ===
Hiraki competed in F4 Japanese Championship from 2015 to 2017.

=== Super GT ===
Hiraki stepped up to Super GT in 2018 with Team Mach alongside Natsu Sakaguchi for three years. Hiraki joined Team Mach alongside his brother Reiji Hiraki in 2021.

HELM Motorsports made their season debut in the GT300 class of Super GT in 2024. Hiraki was joined by Kohei Hirate and his brother Reiji, who was the team's third driver.

=== Super Formula Lights ===
Hiraki, alongside his younger brother Reiji, joined Super Formula Lights with their own team HELM Motorsports.

=== Super Taikyu ===
Hiraki alongside his younger brother Reiji's HELM Motorsports made their debut in 2022 in Super Taikyu ST-X Class, with Yutaka Toriba as the third driver. In that season, they won the ST-X Class.

== Racing record ==
=== Career summary ===
Season	Series	Team	Races	Wins	Poles	FLaps	Podiums	Points	Position
2015	F4 Japanese Championship	RS Fine	14	0	1	0	5	83	5th
2016	F4 Japanese Championship	Le Beausset Motorsports	13	2	0	0	3	106	6th
2017	F4 Japanese Championship	Le Beausset Motorsports	14	0	0	0	0	56	11th
2018	Super GT - GT300	Team Mach	8	0	0	1	0	4	20nd
2019	Super GT - GT300	Team Mach	7	0	0	0	1	15	21st
2020	Super GT - GT300	Team Mach	7	0	0	0	1	19	22nd
2020	Super Taikyu - ST-1	Field Management Racing	1	0	0	0	1	27‡	**3rd‡**
2020	Super Taikyu - ST-3	HELM Motorsports	2	1	1	0	2	44‡	5th‡
2021	Super GT - GT300	Team Mach	8	0	0	0	0	6	22nd
2021	Super Taikyu - ST-3	HELM Motorsports	6	1	1	0	3	101.5‡	**3rd‡**
2022	Super Taikyu - ST-X	HELM Motorsports	7	2	1	0	3	134.5‡	**1st‡**
2022	Super Formula Lights	HELM Motorsports	12	0	0	0	0	2	10th
2022	Super GT - GT300	NILZZ Racing	1	0	0	0	0	0	NC
2023	Super Taikyu - ST-X	HELM Motorsports	7	0	2	0	3	117‡	**3rd‡**
2023	Formula Regional Japanese Championship	HELM Motorsports	3	1	0	1	3	55	8th
2024	Super GT - GT300	HELM Motorsports	8	0	0	0	0	1	20th
2025	Super GT - GT300	HELM Motorsports	8	0	0	0	0	18	23rd
2026	Super GT - GT300	HELM Motorsports	8	0	0	0	0	19	29th

=== Complete F4 Japanese Championship results ===
(key) (Races in bold indicate pole position) (Races in italics indicate fastest lap)

Year	Team	1	2	3	4	5	6	7	8	9	10	11	12	13	14	DC	Pts
2015	RS Fine	OKA; 1; 3	OKA; 2; 7	FUJ1; 1; 6	FUJ1; 2 Ret	FUJ2; 1; 3	FUJ2; 2; 2	SUZ; 1; 3	SUZ; 2; 3	SUG; 1; 12	SUG; 2; 13	AUT; 1; 4	**AUT**; **2**; 20	MOT; 1 Ret	MOT; 2; 13	5th	83
2016	Le Beausset Motorsports	OKA; 1 Ret	OKA; 2; 5	FUJ1; 1; 15	FUJ1; 2; 8	SUG; 1; 4	SUG; 2; 5	FUJ2; 1; 10	FUJ2; 2; 14	FUJ2; 3; 1	SUZ; 1; 8	SUZ; 2; 11	MOT; 1; 3	MOT; 2; 18	MOT; 3; 1	6th	106
2017	Le Beausset Motorsports	OKA; 1; 6	OKA; 2; 8	FUJ1; 1; 10	FUJ1; 2; 8	AUT; 1; 8	AUT; 2; 6	SUG; 1; 10	SUG; 2; 7	FUJ2; 1; 5	FUJ2; 2; 7	SUZ; 1; 8	SUZ; 2 DSQ	MOT; 1; 12	MOT; 2; 11	11th	56

=== Complete Super GT results ===
Year	Team	Car	Class	1	2	3	4	5	6	7	8	9	DC	Pts
2018	Team Mach	Toyota 86 MC	GT300	OKA; Ret	FUJ; 12	SUZ; Ret	CHA	FUJ; 19	SUG; 22	AUT; 7	MOT; 18		20th	4
2019	Team Mach	Toyota 86 MC GT300	GT300	OKA; 21	FUJ; 21	SUZ; 2	CHA	FUJ; 17	AUT; 17	SUG; 18	MOT; 24		21st	15
2020	Team Mach	Toyota 86 MC GT300	GT300	FUJ; 3	FUJ; 11	SUZ; 29	MOT; 23	FUJ; 15	SUZ; 4	MOT; Ret	FUJ; Ret		14th	19
2021	Team Mach	Toyota 86 MC GT300	GT300	OKA; 25	FUJ1; 12	MOT; 27	SUZ; 5	SUG; 22	AUT; 21	MOT2; 18	FUJ2; 25		22nd	6
2022	NILZZ Racing	Nissan GT-R Nismo GT3	GT300	OKA	FUJ	SUZ; 21	FUJ	SUZ	SUG	AUT	MOT		NC	0
2024	HELM Motorsports	Nissan GT-R Nismo GT3	GT300	OKA; 18	FUJ; 10	SUZ; 11	FUJ; 13	SUG; 13	AUT; 17	MOT; 17	SUZ; 16		20th	1
2025	HELM Motorsports	Nissan GT-R Nismo GT3	GT300	OKA; 19	FUJ; Ret	SEP; 11	FS1; 19	FS2 (12)	SUZ; 15	SUG; 10	AUT; 13	MOT; 15	23rd	18
2026	HELM Motorsports	Nissan GT-R Nismo GT3	GT300	OKA; 24	FUJ; 13	FUJ; 8	SUZ; 19	SUG; 19	AUT; 8	MOT; 17	MOT; 20		29th	19

^{‡} Half points awarded as less than 75% of race distance was completed.
^{(Number)} Driver did not take part in this sprint race, points are still awarded for the teammate's result.
^{*} Season still in progress.

=== Complete Super Formula Lights results ===
(key) (Races in bold indicate pole position) (Races in italics indicate fastest lap)

Year	Entrant	1	2	3	4	5	6	7	8	9	10	11	12	13	14	15	16	17	18	Pos	Points
2022	HELM Motorsports	FUJ; 1; 8	FUJ; 2; 10	FUJ; 3; 10	SUZ; 1; 10	SUZ; 2; 9	SUZ; 3; 10	AUT; 1; 10	AUT; 2; 5	AUT; 3; 10	SUG; 1; 8	SUG; 2; 10	SUG; 3 Ret	MOT; 1 WD	MOT; 2 WD	MOT; 3 WD	OKA; 1	OKA; 2	OKA; 3	10th	2

=== Complete Formula Regional Japanese Championship results ===
(key) (Races in bold indicate pole position) (Races in italics indicate fastest lap)

Year	Entrant	1	2	3	4	5	6	7	8	9	10	11	12	13	14	15	16	Pos	Points
2023	HELM Motorsports	FUJ1; 1; 1	FUJ1; 2; 3	FUJ1; 3; 3	SUZ; 1	SUZ; 2	OKA; 1	OKA; 2	OKA; 3	MOT; 1	MOT; 2	MOT; 3	FUJ2; 1	FUJ2; 2	SUG; 1	SUG; 2	SUG; 3	8th	55
