= 2024 Super GT Series =

Sports car racing season in Japan

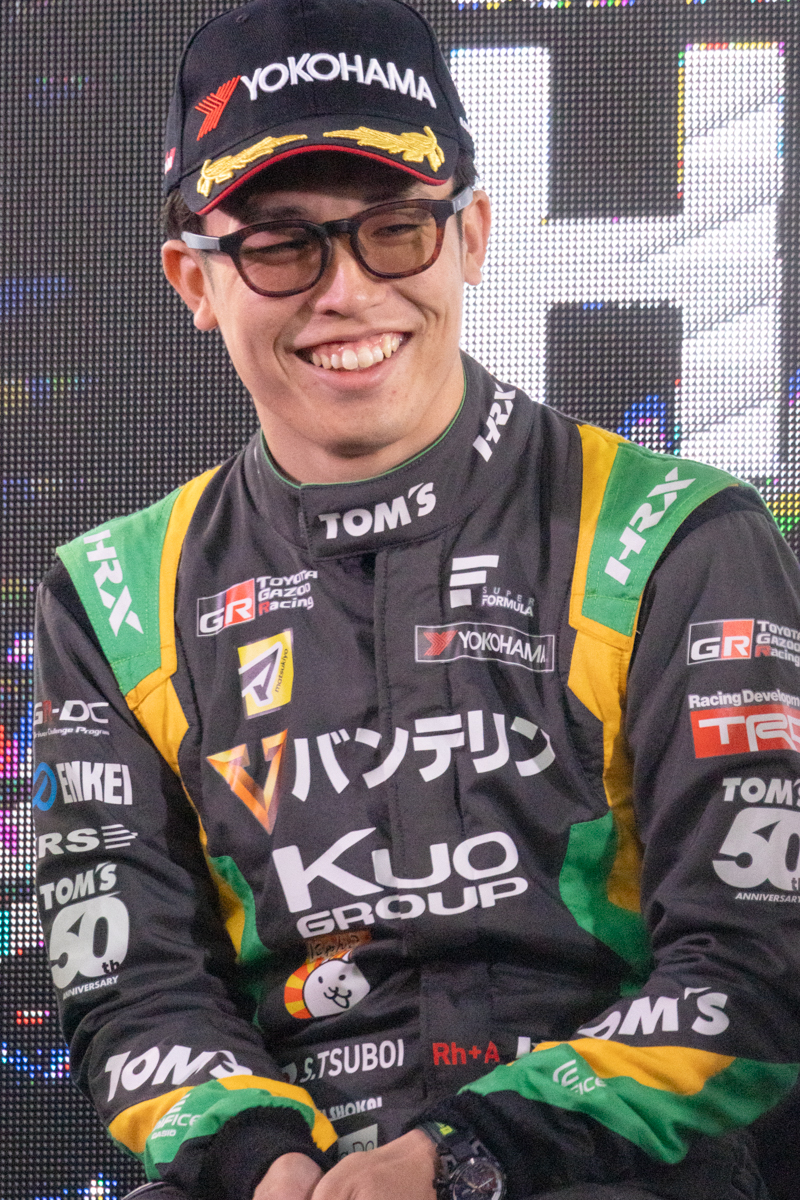
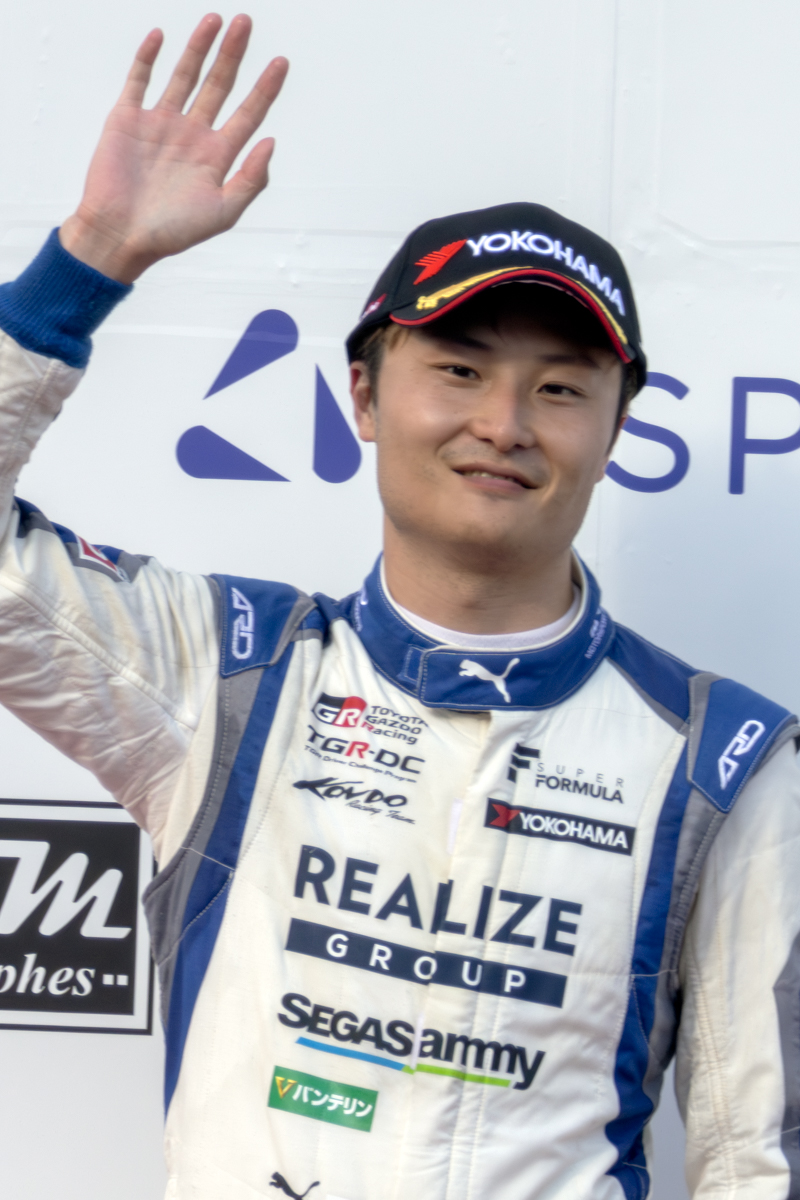
Sho Tsuboi & Kenta Yamashita was the GT500 driver's champion, driving for TGR Team au TOM'S, who were the GT500 teams' champions

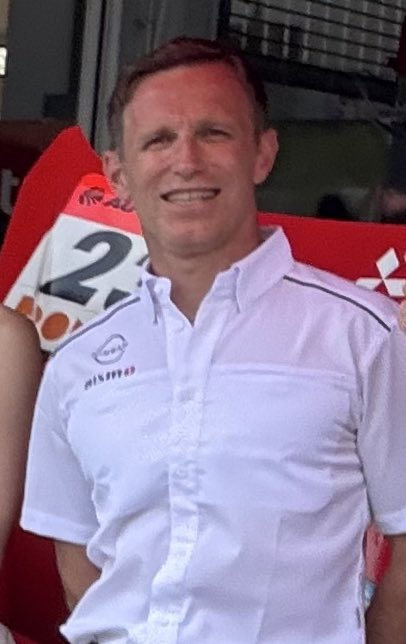
The 2024 Super GT Series was the last season for the four-time GT500 champion Ronnie Quintarelli, having participated in the series since 2005.

The 2024 Autobacs Super GT Series was a motor racing championship based in Japan for grand touring cars. The series sanctioned by the Japan Automobile Federation (JAF) and run by the GT Association (GTA). It was the thirty-second season of the JAF Super GT Championship, which includes the All Japan Grand Touring Car Championship era, and the twentieth season under the Super GT name. It is also the forty-second overall season of a national JAF sportscar championship dating back to the All Japan Endurance/Sports Prototype Championship.

TGR Team au TOM'S and driver Sho Tsuboi entered the season as the defending champions of the GT500 class. Saitama Green Brave, formerly known as Saitama Toyopet Green Brave, and driver Hiroki Yoshida entered as the defending GT300 class champions.

This was the final season for four-time GT500 champion, Ronnie Quintarelli, who announced his retirement at the end of the season.

TGR Team au TOM'S won the championship in the GT500 class for a consecutive year, with Sho Tsuboi and Kenta Yamashita won the Drivers' Championship. In the GT300 class, JLOC, Takashi Kogure and Yuya Motojima won the Teams' and Drivers' Championship which were their first maiden title in the series.

== Calendar ==
A confirmed eight round provisional 2024 calendar was announced on 3 August 2023. On 3 October 2023, it was announced that the seventh round at Autopolis would be moved back two weeks to 19–20 October, in order to eliminate a clash of dates with the MotoGP Japanese Grand Prix.

On 29 February 2024, distances for all rounds were confirmed. The Golden Week race at Fuji Speedway, the Spring race at Suzuka Circuit, and the penultimate race at Autopolis will be three-hour timed races, the first championship races to be run to a timed format. The Summer races at Fuji and Suzuka will be 350 kilometres long. On 28 August 2024, it was announced that the 2nd Suzuka round was postponed to 7–8 December due to the threat of Typhoon Shanshan, followed by an 21 October 2024 announcement the race will be reduced from 61 laps (350 km) to 52 laps (300 km)with an earlier (12.40) start featuring a time certain finish of 15.30 if the 52 laps cannot be completed by then.

Round	Race	Circuit	Location	Support bill	Dates	Map
1	Okayama GT 300 km Race	(Okayama Prefecture) Okayama International Circuit	Mimasaka, Okayama Prefecture		14 April	2024 Super GT Series is located in Japan
2	Fuji GT 3 Hours Race	(Shizuoka Prefecture) Fuji Speedway	Oyama, Shizuoka Prefecture	F4 Japanese Championship; Porsche Carrera Cup Japan	4 May	2024 Super GT Series is located in Japan
3	Suzuka GT 3 Hours Race	(Mie Prefecture) Suzuka Circuit	Suzuka, Mie Prefecture	F4 Japanese Championship	2 June	2024 Super GT Series is located in Japan
4	Fuji GT 350 km Race	(Shizuoka Prefecture) Fuji Speedway	Oyama, Shizuoka Prefecture	F4 Japanese Championship; Porsche Carrera Cup Japan	4 August	2024 Super GT Series is located in Japan
5	Sugo GT 300 km Race	(Miyagi Prefecture) Sportsland Sugo	Murata, Miyagi Prefecture	F4 Japanese Championship	22 September	2024 Super GT Series is located in Japan
6	Autopolis GT 3 Hours Race	(Ōita Prefecture) Autopolis	Hita, Oita Prefecture	F4 Japanese Championship	20 October	2024 Super GT Series is located in Japan
7	Motegi GT 300 km Race	(Tochigi Prefecture) Mobility Resort Motegi	Motegi, Tochigi Prefecture	F4 Japanese Championship	3 November	2024 Super GT Series is located in Japan
8	Suzuka GT 300 km Race	(Mie Prefecture) Suzuka Circuit	Suzuka, Mie Prefecture	F4 Japanese Championship	8 December	2024 Super GT Series is located in Japan

== Regulation changes ==
The GTA confirmed several changes for the 2024 Super GT season.

=== Aggregate qualifying format ===
Super GT introduced a new aggregate qualifying system on 9 February, replacing the knockout format which had been used since 2013.

- Under the new format, the grids in GT500 and GT300 will be determined by the combined Q1 and Q2 times of each team's two nominated drivers.
- Each team is only allowed to use one set of tyres throughout Q1 and Q2, and must start the race on the same set of tyres.
- Teams that don't participate in qualifying, fail to set a time in both qualifying sessions, or fail to meet the 107% minimum time after Q2 will have to start the race from the pits.
- Points will now be awarded to the top three qualifiers in each class. The pole-winning team and drivers now earn three points, while second place earns two points and third place earns one point.
- Pole position will be credited to both drivers on the pole-winning team that run in qualifying.

On 12 March, a follow-up bulletin would detail the changes made to GT300 qualifying:

- Similar to recent years, the GT300 field would be split into two groups for Q1 based on the most recent Teams' Championship standings, with odd number-ranked teams in Group A and even number-ranked teams in Group B. A pre-event lottery would determine which group goes first in Q1.
- After both Q1 groups have run, the cars would be regrouped for Q2. The top eight cars in each Q1 group will go into Q2 Group 1, and the cars that finished outside the top eight in each group would go into Q2 Group 2.
- Once Group 2 and Group 1 have run, the final grid order will be determined based on these final groupings:
  - Positions 1-12: Top 12 combined times in Q2 Group 1.
  - Positions 13-20: Combined times of the top four in Q2 Group 2 and bottom four in Q2 Group 1.
  - Positions 21-27: Combined times of the remaining cars that finished fifth or lower in Q2 Group 2.
- In the event of rain, the GT300 grid will be determined from Q2 times only.

=== Other changes ===
Beginning in 2024, GT300 teams will use 50 percent renewable carbon-neutral synthetic fuel supplied by ETS Racing Fuels.

Teams will only be allocated four sets of dry tyres for 300 kilometre races, down from five sets in 2023. Five sets of dry tyres will be available for 350 km events, and six sets of tyres will be available in three-hour timed events.

GT300 success ballast has been reduced to a maximum of 100 kilogrammes to just 80 kg. GT300 teams will now receive two kilogrammes of Success Weight per drivers' championship point scored from rounds one through six. There is a limit of 50 points (100 kg).

To reduce cornering speeds, the GTA implemented new technical directives in both class. In GT500, the minimum ride height has been raised by 5 millimetres by increasing the thickness of the skid block. In GT300, all cars will carry a predetermined amount of additional ballast weight, between 33 and 52 kg. This additional weight is distinct from the weight assigned to each car as part of the balance of performance.

== Teams and drivers ==
=== GT500 ===
Team	Make	Car	Engine	No.	Drivers	Tyre	Rounds	Ref.
NISMO NDDP	Nissan	Nissan Z NISMO GT500	Nissan NR4S24 2.0 L Turbo I4	3	(Japan) Mitsunori Takaboshi	B	All	
NISMO NDDP	Nissan	Nissan Z NISMO GT500	Nissan NR4S24 2.0 L Turbo I4	3	(Japan) Atsushi Miyake	B	All	
NISMO	Nissan	Nissan Z NISMO GT500	Nissan NR4S24 2.0 L Turbo I4	23	(Japan) Katsumasa Chiyo	B	All	
NISMO	Nissan	Nissan Z NISMO GT500	Nissan NR4S24 2.0 L Turbo I4	23	(Italy) Ronnie Quintarelli	B	All	
ARTA (Note: The team is operated by Mugen, and their cars are entered as ARTA Mugen Civic Type R-GTs.)	Honda	Honda Civic Type R-GT	Honda HR-420E 2.0 L Turbo I4	8	(Japan) Tomoki Nojiri	B	All	
ARTA	Honda	Honda Civic Type R-GT	Honda HR-420E 2.0 L Turbo I4	8	(Japan) Nobuharu Matsushita	B	All	
ARTA	Honda	Honda Civic Type R-GT	Honda HR-420E 2.0 L Turbo I4	16	(Japan) Hiroki Otsu	B	All	
ARTA	Honda	Honda Civic Type R-GT	Honda HR-420E 2.0 L Turbo I4	16	(Japan) Ren Sato	B	All	
Team Impul	Nissan	Nissan Z NISMO GT500	Nissan NR4S24 2.0 L Turbo I4	12	(Japan) Kazuki Hiramine	B	All	
Team Impul	Nissan	Nissan Z NISMO GT500	Nissan NR4S24 2.0 L Turbo I4	12	(Belgium) Bertrand Baguette	B	All	
TGR Team ENEOS ROOKIE	Toyota GR	Toyota GR Supra GT500	Toyota RI4BG 2.0 L Turbo I4	14	(Japan) Kazuya Oshima	B	All	
TGR Team ENEOS ROOKIE	Toyota GR	Toyota GR Supra GT500	Toyota RI4BG 2.0 L Turbo I4	14	(Japan) Nirei Fukuzumi	B	All	
Astemo Real Racing	Honda	Honda Civic Type R-GT	Honda HR-420E 2.0 L Turbo I4	17	(Japan) Koudai Tsukakoshi	B	All	
Astemo Real Racing	Honda	Honda Civic Type R-GT	Honda HR-420E 2.0 L Turbo I4	17	(Japan) Kakunoshin Ohta	B	All	
TGR Team WedsSport Bandoh	Toyota GR	Toyota GR Supra GT500	Toyota RI4BG 2.0 L Turbo I4	19	(Japan) Yuji Kunimoto	Y	All	
TGR Team WedsSport Bandoh	Toyota GR	Toyota GR Supra GT500	Toyota RI4BG 2.0 L Turbo I4	19	(Japan) Sena Sakaguchi	Y	All	
Kondo Racing	Nissan	Nissan Z NISMO GT500	Nissan NR4S24 2.0 L Turbo I4	24	(Japan) Tsugio Matsuda	Y	All	
Kondo Racing	Nissan	Nissan Z NISMO GT500	Nissan NR4S24 2.0 L Turbo I4	24	(Japan) Teppei Natori	Y	All	
TGR Team au TOM'S	Toyota GR	Toyota GR Supra GT500	Toyota RI4BG 2.0 L Turbo I4	36	(Japan) Sho Tsuboi	B	All	
TGR Team au TOM'S	Toyota GR	Toyota GR Supra GT500	Toyota RI4BG 2.0 L Turbo I4	36	(Japan) Kenta Yamashita	B	All	
TGR Team Deloitte TOM'S	Toyota GR	Toyota GR Supra GT500	Toyota RI4BG 2.0 L Turbo I4	37	(Japan) Ukyo Sasahara	B	All	
TGR Team Deloitte TOM'S	Toyota GR	Toyota GR Supra GT500	Toyota RI4BG 2.0 L Turbo I4	37	(France) Giuliano Alesi	B	All	
TGR Team KeePer Cerumo	Toyota GR	Toyota GR Supra GT500	Toyota RI4BG 2.0 L Turbo I4	38	(Japan) Hiroaki Ishiura	B	All	
TGR Team KeePer Cerumo	Toyota GR	Toyota GR Supra GT500	Toyota RI4BG 2.0 L Turbo I4	38	(Japan) Toshiki Oyu	B	All	
TGR Team SARD	Toyota GR	Toyota GR Supra GT500	Toyota RI4BG 2.0 L Turbo I4	39	(Japan) Yuhi Sekiguchi	B	All	
TGR Team SARD	Toyota GR	Toyota GR Supra GT500	Toyota RI4BG 2.0 L Turbo I4	39	(Japan) Yuichi Nakayama	B	All	
Modulo Nakajima Racing	Honda	Honda Civic Type R-GT	Honda HR-420E 2.0 L Turbo I4	64	(Japan) Takuya Izawa	D	All	
Modulo Nakajima Racing	Honda	Honda Civic Type R-GT	Honda HR-420E 2.0 L Turbo I4	64	(Japan) Riki Okusa	D	All	
Stanley Team Kunimitsu	Honda	Honda Civic Type R-GT	Honda HR-420E 2.0 L Turbo I4	100	(Japan) Naoki Yamamoto	B	All	
Stanley Team Kunimitsu	Honda	Honda Civic Type R-GT	Honda HR-420E 2.0 L Turbo I4	100	(Japan) Tadasuke Makino	B	All	

=== GT300 ===
Team	Make	Car	Engine	No.	Drivers	Tyre	Rounds	Ref.
muta Racing INGING	Toyota GR	Toyota GR86 GT300	Toyota 2UR-GSE 5.4 L V8	2	(Japan) Yuui Tsutsumi	B	All	
muta Racing INGING	Toyota GR	Toyota GR86 GT300	Toyota 2UR-GSE 5.4 L V8	2	(Japan) Hibiki Taira	B	All	
Goodsmile Racing & TeamUKYO	Mercedes-AMG	Mercedes-AMG GT3 Evo	Mercedes-AMG M159 6.2 L V8	4	(Japan) Nobuteru Taniguchi	Y	All	
Goodsmile Racing & TeamUKYO	Mercedes-AMG	Mercedes-AMG GT3 Evo	Mercedes-AMG M159 6.2 L V8	4	(Japan) Tatsuya Kataoka	Y	All	
Team Mach	Toyota	Toyota 86 MC GT300	GTA V8 4.5 L V8	5	(Japan) Kiyoto Fujinami	Y	All	
Team Mach	Toyota	Toyota 86 MC GT300	GTA V8 4.5 L V8	5	(Japan) Yusuke Shiotsu	Y	All	
Team LeMans	Ferrari	Ferrari 296 GT3	Ferrari F163CE 3.0 L Twin Turbo V6	6	(Japan) Yoshiaki Katayama	Y	All	
Team LeMans	Ferrari	Ferrari 296 GT3	Ferrari F163CE 3.0 L Twin Turbo V6	6	(Spain) Roberto Merhi Muntan	Y	All	
BMW M Team Studie × CRS	BMW	BMW M4 GT3	BMW P58 3.0 L Twin Turbo I6	7	(Japan) Seiji Ara	M	All	
BMW M Team Studie × CRS	BMW	BMW M4 GT3	BMW P58 3.0 L Twin Turbo I6	7	(Germany) Niklas Krütten	M	All	
BMW M Team Studie × CRS	BMW	BMW M4 GT3	BMW P58 3.0 L Twin Turbo I6	7	(Canada) Bruno Spengler	M	2–4, 6, 8	
Pacific Racing Team	Mercedes-AMG	Mercedes-AMG GT3 Evo	Mercedes-AMG M159 6.2 L V8	9	(Japan) Ryohei Sakaguchi	Y	All	
Pacific Racing Team	Mercedes-AMG	Mercedes-AMG GT3 Evo	Mercedes-AMG M159 6.2 L V8	9	(Japan) Yusuke Tomibayashi	Y	All	
Pacific Racing Team	Mercedes-AMG	Mercedes-AMG GT3 Evo	Mercedes-AMG M159 6.2 L V8	9	(Japan) Yuta Fujiwara	Y	2–4, 6, 8	
GAINER	Nissan	Nissan Fairlady Z GT300 (RZ34)	Nissan VR38DETT 3.8 L Twin Turbo V6	11	(Japan) Ryuichiro Tomita	D	All	
GAINER	Nissan	Nissan Fairlady Z GT300 (RZ34)	Nissan VR38DETT 3.8 L Twin Turbo V6	11	(Japan) Keishi Ishikawa	D	All	
GAINER	Nissan	Nissan Fairlady Z GT300 (RZ34)	Nissan VR38DETT 3.8 L Twin Turbo V6	11	(Japan) Kazuki Oki	D	8	
PONOS Racing	Ferrari	Ferrari 296 GT3	Ferrari F163CE 3.0 L Twin Turbo V6	45	(Japan) Kei Cozzolino	M	All	
PONOS Racing	Ferrari	Ferrari 296 GT3	Ferrari F163CE 3.0 L Twin Turbo V6	45	(France) Lilou Wadoux	M	All	
Team UpGarage	Honda	Honda NSX GT3 Evo22	Honda JNC1 3.5 L Twin Turbo V6	18	(Japan) Takashi Kobayashi	Y	All	
Team UpGarage	Honda	Honda NSX GT3 Evo22	Honda JNC1 3.5 L Twin Turbo V6	18	(Japan) Syun Koide	Y	All	
Team UpGarage	Honda	Honda NSX GT3 Evo22	Honda JNC1 3.5 L Twin Turbo V6	18	(Japan) Yusuke Mitsui	Y	2–4, 6, 8	
SHADE Racing	Toyota GR	Toyota GR86 GT300	Toyota 2UR-GSE 5.4 L V8	20	(Japan) Katsuyuki Hiranaka	M	All	
SHADE Racing	Toyota GR	Toyota GR86 GT300	Toyota 2UR-GSE 5.4 L V8	20	(Japan) Eijiro Shimizu	M	All	
R'Qs Motor Sports	Mercedes-AMG	Mercedes-AMG GT3 Evo	Mercedes-AMG M159 6.2 L V8	22	(Japan) Hisashi Wada	Y	All	
R'Qs Motor Sports	Mercedes-AMG	Mercedes-AMG GT3 Evo	Mercedes-AMG M159 6.2 L V8	22	(Japan) Masaki Kano	Y	1–2, 6, 8	
R'Qs Motor Sports	Mercedes-AMG	Mercedes-AMG GT3 Evo	Mercedes-AMG M159 6.2 L V8	22	(Japan) Masaki Jyonai	Y	2–3, 5, 7	
R'Qs Motor Sports	Mercedes-AMG	Mercedes-AMG GT3 Evo	Mercedes-AMG M159 6.2 L V8	22	(Japan) Miki Koyama	Y	3–4, 6	
Anest Iwata Racing with Arnage	Lexus	Lexus RC F GT3	Lexus 2UR-GSE 5.4 L V8	50	(Brazil) Igor Omura Fraga	Y	All	
Anest Iwata Racing with Arnage	Lexus	Lexus RC F GT3	Lexus 2UR-GSE 5.4 L V8	50	(Japan) Yuga Furutani	Y	All	
Hoppy Team Tsuchiya	Toyota GR	Toyota GR Supra GT300	Toyota 2UR-GSE 5.4 L V8	25	(Japan) Takamitsu Matsui	Y	All	
Hoppy Team Tsuchiya	Toyota GR	Toyota GR Supra GT300	Toyota 2UR-GSE 5.4 L V8	25	(Japan) Togo Suganami	Y	1–4, 6–8	
Hoppy Team Tsuchiya	Toyota GR	Toyota GR Supra GT300	Toyota 2UR-GSE 5.4 L V8	25	(Japan) Kimiya Sato	Y	2–6, 8	
apr	Toyota GR	Toyota GR86 GT300	Toyota 2UR-GSE 5.4 L V8	30	(Japan) Rikuto Kobayashi	Y	All	
apr	Toyota GR	Toyota GR86 GT300	Toyota 2UR-GSE 5.4 L V8	30	(Japan) Hiroaki Nagai	Y	1–6, 8	
apr	Toyota GR	Toyota GR86 GT300	Toyota 2UR-GSE 5.4 L V8	30	(Japan) Manabu Orido	Y	2–4, 6–8	
apr	Lexus	Lexus LC 500h GT300	Lexus 2UR-GSE 5.4 L Hybrid V8	31	(Japan) Kazuto Kotaka	B	All	
apr	Lexus	Lexus LC 500h GT300	Lexus 2UR-GSE 5.4 L Hybrid V8	31	(Japan) Jin Nakamura	B	All	
apr	Lexus	Lexus LC 500h GT300	Lexus 2UR-GSE 5.4 L Hybrid V8	31	(Japan) Yuki Nemoto	B	2–4, 6, 8	
NILZZ Racing	Nissan	Nissan GT-R Nismo GT3	Nissan VR38DETT 3.8 L Twin Turbo V6	48	(Japan) Taiyo Ida	Y	All	
NILZZ Racing	Nissan	Nissan GT-R Nismo GT3	Nissan VR38DETT 3.8 L Twin Turbo V6	48	(Japan) Yusaku Shibata	Y	1–3, 5–7	
NILZZ Racing	Nissan	Nissan GT-R Nismo GT3	Nissan VR38DETT 3.8 L Twin Turbo V6	48	(Japan) Takumi Sanada	Y	2–4, 6, 8	
NILZZ Racing	Nissan	Nissan GT-R Nismo GT3	Nissan VR38DETT 3.8 L Twin Turbo V6	48	(Japan) Takashi Ito	Y	4, 8	
Saitama Green Brave	Toyota GR	Toyota GR Supra GT300	Toyota 2UR-GSE 5.4 L V8	52	(Japan) Hiroki Yoshida	B	All	
Saitama Green Brave	Toyota GR	Toyota GR Supra GT300	Toyota 2UR-GSE 5.4 L V8	52	(Japan) Seita Nonaka	B	All	
Kondo Racing	Nissan	Nissan GT-R Nismo GT3	Nissan VR38DETT 3.8 L Twin Turbo V6	56	(Japan) Daiki Sasaki	Y	All	
Kondo Racing	Nissan	Nissan GT-R Nismo GT3	Nissan VR38DETT 3.8 L Twin Turbo V6	56	(Brazil) João Paulo de Oliveira	Y	All	
LM corsa	Toyota GR	Toyota GR Supra GT300	Toyota 2UR-GSE 5.4 L V8	60	(Japan) Hiroki Yoshimoto	D	All	
LM corsa	Toyota GR	Toyota GR Supra GT300	Toyota 2UR-GSE 5.4 L V8	60	(Japan) Shunsuke Kohno	D	All	
LM corsa	Toyota GR	Toyota GR Supra GT300	Toyota 2UR-GSE 5.4 L V8	60	(Japan) Reimei Ito	D	8	
R&D Sport	Subaru	Subaru BRZ GT300 (ZD8)	Subaru EJ20 2.0 L Turbo F4	61	(Japan) Takuto Iguchi	D	All	
R&D Sport	Subaru	Subaru BRZ GT300 (ZD8)	Subaru EJ20 2.0 L Turbo F4	61	(Japan) Hideki Yamauchi	D	All	
HELM Motorsports	Nissan	Nissan GT-R Nismo GT3	Nissan VR38DETT 3.8 L Twin Turbo V6	62	(Japan) Kohei Hirate	Y	All	
HELM Motorsports	Nissan	Nissan GT-R Nismo GT3	Nissan VR38DETT 3.8 L Twin Turbo V6	62	(Japan) Yuya Hiraki	Y	All	
HELM Motorsports	Nissan	Nissan GT-R Nismo GT3	Nissan VR38DETT 3.8 L Twin Turbo V6	62	(Japan) Reiji Hiraki	Y	2–4, 6, 8	
K2 R&D LEON Racing	Mercedes-AMG	Mercedes-AMG GT3 Evo	Mercedes-AMG M159 6.2 L V8	65	(Japan) Naoya Gamou	B	All	
K2 R&D LEON Racing	Mercedes-AMG	Mercedes-AMG GT3 Evo	Mercedes-AMG M159 6.2 L V8	65	(Japan) Takuro Shinohara	B	All	
K2 R&D LEON Racing	Mercedes-AMG	Mercedes-AMG GT3 Evo	Mercedes-AMG M159 6.2 L V8	65	(Japan) Haruki Kurosawa	B	2–4, 6, 8	
JLOC	Lamborghini	Lamborghini Huracán GT3 Evo 3 Lamborghini Huracán GT3 Evo 2 5	Lamborghini DGF 5.2 L V10	87	(Japan) Kosuke Matsuura	Y	All	
JLOC	Lamborghini	Lamborghini Huracán GT3 Evo 3 Lamborghini Huracán GT3 Evo 2 5	Lamborghini DGF 5.2 L V10	87	(Japan) Natsu Sakaguchi	Y	All	
JLOC	Lamborghini	Lamborghini Huracán GT3 Evo 2	Lamborghini DGF 5.2 L V10	88	(Japan) Takashi Kogure	Y	All	
JLOC	Lamborghini	Lamborghini Huracán GT3 Evo 2	Lamborghini DGF 5.2 L V10	88	(Japan) Yuya Motojima	Y	All	
K-tunes Racing	Lexus	Lexus RC F GT3	Lexus 2UR-GSE 5.4 L V8	96	(Japan) Morio Nitta	D	All	
K-tunes Racing	Lexus	Lexus RC F GT3	Lexus 2UR-GSE 5.4 L V8	96	(Japan) Shinichi Takagi	D	All	
Tomei Sports	Nissan	Nissan GT-R Nismo GT3	Nissan VR38DETT 3.8 L Twin Turbo V6	360	(Japan) Takayuki Aoki	Y	1–7	
Tomei Sports	Nissan	Nissan GT-R Nismo GT3	Nissan VR38DETT 3.8 L Twin Turbo V6	360	(Japan) Takuya Otaki	Y	1–6, 8	
Tomei Sports	Nissan	Nissan GT-R Nismo GT3	Nissan VR38DETT 3.8 L Twin Turbo V6	360	(Japan) Rin Arakawa	Y	2–4, 7–8	
Tomei Sports	Nissan	Nissan GT-R Nismo GT3	Nissan VR38DETT 3.8 L Twin Turbo V6	360	(Japan) Atsushi Tanaka	Y	6, 8	
D'station Racing	Aston Martin	Aston Martin Vantage AMR GT3 Evo	Aston Martin AMR16A 4.0 L Twin Turbo V8	777	(Japan) Tomonobu Fujii	D	All	
D'station Racing	Aston Martin	Aston Martin Vantage AMR GT3 Evo	Aston Martin AMR16A 4.0 L Twin Turbo V8	777	(Denmark) Marco Sørensen	D	1	
D'station Racing	Aston Martin	Aston Martin Vantage AMR GT3 Evo	Aston Martin AMR16A 4.0 L Twin Turbo V8	777	(United Kingdom) Charlie Fagg	D	2–8	

=== Vehicle changes ===
==== GT500 ====
- Honda Racing Corporation introduced the new Civic Type R-GT in 2024, replacing the second-generation NSX-GT that has run for 7 years.
- Nissan Motorsports & Customizing introduced a new version of the Nissan Z GT500, the Nissan Z NISMO GT500, based on its road-going production variant.

==== GT300 ====
- Team LeMans entered a new Ferrari 296 GT3, replacing its previous Audi R8 LMS GT3 Evo II which had raced for three seasons.
- GAINER developed a new version of the Nissan Fairlady Z built to the GTA-GT300 vehicle regulations, replacing the number 11 Nissan GT-R NISMO GT3 that had raced since 2018. The car was revealed ahead of the opening round at Okayama and made its race debut at the Fuji 3 Hours.
- The former number 10 GAINER Nissan GT-R NISMO GT3 was replaced by the number 45 Ferrari 296 GT3 entered by PONOS Racing. (see Entrant changes below).

=== Entrant changes ===
==== GT500 ====
- Toyota announced its driver line-ups on 12 December 2023.
  - Three-time GT500 champion Yuji Tachikawa retired from driving after the 2023 season and became the team director at Cerumo for the second time. Former Honda driver Toshiki Oyu moved to Cerumo. Car care company KeePer, which previously served as the main sponsor for the TOM'S number 37 car, replaced long time sponsor ZENT as the title sponsor of Team Cerumo.
  - Reigning GT500 champion Ritomo Miyata left the series after the 2023 season to compete overseas in Formula 2 and the European Le Mans Series. 2019 GT500 champion Kenta Yamashita joined reigning champion team au TOM'S to fill the seat vacated by Miyata. TOM'S elected not to use the GT500 champion's number "1" in 2024. Two-time GT500 Champion Michael Krumm became the new team director of the number 37 Deloitte TOM'S GR Supra. Jun Yamada was promoted to the role of general manager overseeing both TOM'S cars.
  - Nirei Fukuzumi also followed Oyu move to Toyota from Honda as he moved to Rookie Racing replacing au TOM'S-bound Kenta Yamashita.
- Honda announced its driver line-ups on 12 December 2023.
  - To replace the Toyota-bound Fukuzumi and Oyu, both Nobuharu Matsushita and Ren Sato joined ARTA. Matsushita, who spent the last two seasons with Astemo Real Racing, partner up alongside Tomoki Nojiri in the number 8 car. Sato, who drove for ARTA's GT300 team in 2021, made his GT500 debut alongside Hiroki Otsu in the number 16 car.
  - Kakunoshin Ohta replaced Matsushita at Real Racing, alongside Koudai Tsukakoshi who returns for his 16th full season with the team.
  - Riki Okusa who raced with GAINER in GT300, made his GT500 debut with Nakajima Racing replacing Ohta.
  - Team Kunimitsu saw its main sponsor Stanley take on a bigger role in the team as the title sponsor, with the team competing under the name "Stanley Team Kunimitsu".
- Nissan announced its driver line-ups on 18 January 2024.
  - Both NISMO teams changed tyre suppliers to Bridgestone following Michelin's withdrawal from the GT500 class after the 2023 season. Tsugio Matsuda leaves the number 23 NISMO car. This marked the end of Matsuda and Quintarelli's partnership which lasted for 11 years. (Note: Matsuda and Quintarelli drove for Impul in 2010 and NISMO from 2014-2023.) last year's runner-up Katsumasa Chiyo replaced Matsuda. While the number 3 car rebranded to "NISMO NDDP" entry, former Max Racing GT300 driver Atsushi Miyake replaced Chiyo.
  - Kondo Racing have a new line up as Daiki Sasaki and Kohei Hirate were dropped from Nissan's GT500 line-ups, with Sasaki stayed with Kondo Racing and Hirate to the new entry of HELM Motorsports. Two-time GT500 champion Tsugio Matsuda and Teppei Natori promoted from the team's GT300 setup.

==== GT300 ====
- D'station Racing returned to the series for the first time since 2020, fielding the Aston Martin Vantage GT3 with Dunlop tyres. 2012 GT300 championship runner-up Tomonobu Fujii returned to Super GT for the first time since 2020, and Aston Martin factory driver Marco Sørensen made his series debut.
- Gaming company Ponos which previously sponsored GAINER's no. 10 car, made their series debut under the PONOS Racing guise. GAINER would continue to run the team. Entering the new Ferrari 296 GT3 with Michelin tyres. Le Mans Cup GT3 runner up Kei Cozzolino returned to the series for the first time since 2022, while Ferrari GT factory driver Lilou Wadoux made her series debut after finished 8th in FIA WEC LMGTE class with Richard Mille AF Corse.
- Super Taikyu championship-winning team HELM Motorsports made its Super GT debut in 2024, entering a Nissan GT-R NISMO GT3 with Yokohama tyres. Two-time GT500 champion Kohei Hirate joined the team alongside HELM co-founders Yuya Hiraki and Reiji Hiraki, the latter of whom serves as the team's third driver. Two-time GT300 champion Hideo Fukuyama was appointed as the team director.
- Saitama Toyopet Green Brave changed its official name to "Saitama Green Brave". Reigning GT300 champion Kohta Kawaai left the series and was replaced by TGR-DC driver Seita Nonaka, who spent the last two seasons with Tsuchiya Engineering and was Green Brave's third driver last year at Autopolis. Saitama Green Brave elected not to use the GT300 champion's number "0" in 2024.
- INGING Motorsport team director Hiroki Katoh continued his part as the team's third driver for this season, but did not make a single appearance for this season.
- SHADE Racing changed tyre suppliers from Dunlop to Michelin.
- Tsuchiya Engineering and its Toyota GR Supra GT300 returned to the series after missing the last four rounds of the 2023 season following a fire in the fourth round at Fuji Speedway. Seita Nonaka left the team for Saitama Green Brave. 2016 GT300 champion Takamitsu Matsui returned to the team after racing for Team Mach in 2023 replacing Nonaka. Kimiya Sato, who spent the last three years with Max Racing, returned to the team as its third driver.
- Max Racing ceased operations following a vehicle fire in the fourth round of the 2023 season at Fuji Speedway. Their drivers Atsushi Miyake and Kimiya Sato moved to NISMO NDDP and Tsuchiya respectively.
- 2023 FIA F4 Japanese Champion Rikuto Kobayashi and runner-up Jin Nakamura made their full-time series debuts with apr. Kobayashi drives the number 30 Toyota GR86 alongside Hiroaki Nagai, while two-time GT300 champion Manabu Orido remained with the team as its third driver. Nakamura drives the number 31 Lexus LC 500h alongside Kazuto Kotaka, replacing Koki Saga who focus on Super Taikyu ST-X class program with apr.
- Kondo Racing replaced Teppei Natori with its former GT500 driver Daiki Sasaki. Sasaki reunited with two-time GT300 champion João Paulo de Oliveira for the first time since 2017.
- Ryuichiro Tomita and Keishi Ishikawa drove the new number 11 GAINER Nissan Fairlady Z. 2008 GT300 champion Hironobu Yasuda left the team in the off-season after six years and also left Nissan after 17 years as a factory driver, while Riki Okusa stepped up to GT500 with Nakajima Racing.
- Tomei Sports promoted Takuya Otaki, who had been a spot starter since 2020, to a full-time seat in 2024. As Tomei Sports owner Atsushi Tanaka has the role of third driver with rookie Rin Arakawa, the 2021 FIA F4 Japanese Championship runner-up.
- Gymkhana and time attack specialist Yusaku Shibata transferred to NILZZ Racing as a full-time driver, replacing Yuki Tanaka who will race in Ligier European Series with Pegasus Racing. Takumi Sanada continue his role as the team's third driver.
- Yogibo Racing withdrew its entry for the 2024 season, citing a change in corporate strategy from the Yogibo brand. Reimei Ito move to Porsche Carrera Cup Japan with Bingo Racing with Showa Auto, and Yugo Iwasawa race in Super Taikyu ST-Z with Porsche Team EBI .
- Liang Jiatong left Pacific Racing Team and the series as he moved to GT World Challenge Asia with Harmony Racing. Yusuke Tomibayashi transferred from Team Mach to Pacific Racing Team. F4 graduate Yuta Fujiwara made his series debut as the Team's third driver.
- Miki Koyama transferred from Arnage Racing to R'Qs Motor Sports as the fourth driver for the team, joining Hisashi Wada, Masaki Jyonai, and Masaki Kano. The team will have different line up on each race, with Jyonai raced all rounds, while Jyonai & Kano each had four rounds, and Koyama had three.
- 2023 GT World Challenge Europe Sprint Cup Gold champion Niklas Krütten made his Super GT debut at Team Studie as Seiji Ara's new full-season teammate. BMW M works driver Bruno Spengler stays with the team as the third driver for selected rounds, with Masataka Yanagida leaves the team after one season to take role of team manager at Team ZeroOne in Super Taikyu ST-Z.
- 2022 FIA F4 Japan runner-up Yusuke Mitsui made his series debut as the third driver at Team UpGarage.
- Team Mach have a new line up as Takamitsu Matsui and Yusuke Tomibayashi move to Tsuchiya Engineering and Pacific Racing respectively. Two-time GT300 champion Kiyoto Fujinami who previously drove for Team Mach from 2017 to 2018, returns to the series after missing the 2023 season. and former GAINER third driver Yusuke Shiotsu joined the team.

=== Mid-season changes ===
==== GT300 ====
- 2023 International GT Open champion Charlie Fagg, who drove for D'station Racing in WEC and the Asian Le Mans Series, rejoined the team as the third driver. He replaced Marco Sørensen at the Fuji 3 Hours, and Suzuka 3 Hours. Fagg has been promoted as the second driver of the team as Sørensen focus on his WEC commitent.
- Reigning Super Taikyu Series ST-3 Class champion driver Takashi Ito picked as the fourth driver for NILZZ Racing, and replaces Yusaku Shibata for the fourth round at Fuji, and last round of Suzuka. Shibata returns to the team for round 5 at SUGO.
- JLOC car number 87 replaced their previous GT3 EVO model car with the new Lamborghini Huracán GT3 EVO2 for the fourth round at Fuji Speedway.
- Togo Suganami miss the SUGO round due to illness, Tsuchiya Engineering's third driver Kimiya Sato replace him for the round.
- Manabu Orido, and Rin Arakawa replaces Hiroaki Nagai, and Takuya Otaki respectively for the Motegi round.
- Former Yogibo Racing driver Reimei Ito joins LM corsa as the third driver for the last round at Suzuka. While GAINER recruited Super Taikyu ST-Z driver Kazuki Oki as their third driver for that round.
- Takuya Otaki returned for the final round, with Takayuki Aoki replaced by Tomei's owner Atsushi Tanaka.

== Results ==
Round	Circuit	Class	Pole position	Fastest lap	Race winner
1	Okayama International Circuit	GT500	No. 36 TGR Team au TOM'S	No. 36 TGR Team au TOM'S	No. 36 TGR Team au TOM'S
1	Okayama International Circuit	GT500	(Japan) Sho Tsuboi (Japan) Kenta Yamashita	(Japan) Sho Tsuboi (Japan) Kenta Yamashita	(Japan) Sho Tsuboi (Japan) Kenta Yamashita
1	Okayama International Circuit	GT300	No. 65 K2 R&D LEON Racing	No. 61 R&D Sport	No. 2 muta Racing INGING
1	Okayama International Circuit	GT300	(Japan) Naoya Gamou (Japan) Takuro Shinohara	(Japan) Takuto Iguchi (Japan) Hideki Yamauchi	(Japan) Yuui Tsutsumi (Japan) Hibiki Taira
2	Fuji Speedway	GT500	No. 17 Astemo Real Racing	No. 3 NISMO NDDP	No. 3 NISMO NDDP
2	Fuji Speedway	GT500	(Japan) Koudai Tsukakoshi (Japan) Kakunoshin Ohta	(Japan) Mitsunori Takaboshi (Japan) Atsushi Miyake	(Japan) Mitsunori Takaboshi (Japan) Atsushi Miyake
2	Fuji Speedway	GT300	No. 88 JLOC	No. 777 D'station Racing	No. 88 JLOC
2	Fuji Speedway	GT300	(Japan) Takashi Kogure (Japan) Yuya Motojima	(Japan) Tomonobu Fujii (United Kingdom) Charlie Fagg	(Japan) Takashi Kogure (Japan) Yuya Motojima
3	Suzuka Circuit	GT500	No. 37 TGR Team Deloitte TOM'S	No. 12 Team Impul	No. 37 TGR Team Deloitte TOM'S
3	Suzuka Circuit	GT500	(Japan) Ukyo Sasahara (France) Giuliano Alesi	(Japan) Kazuki Hiramine (Belgium) Bertrand Baguette	(Japan) Ukyo Sasahara (France) Giuliano Alesi
3	Suzuka Circuit	GT300	No. 777 D'station Racing	No. 777 D'station Racing	No. 777 D'station Racing
3	Suzuka Circuit	GT300	(Japan) Tomonobu Fujii (United Kingdom) Charlie Fagg	(Japan) Tomonobu Fujii (United Kingdom) Charlie Fagg	(Japan) Tomonobu Fujii (United Kingdom) Charlie Fagg
4	Fuji Speedway	GT500	No. 8 ARTA	No. 19 TGR Team WedsSport Bandoh	No. 8 ARTA
4	Fuji Speedway	GT500	(Japan) Tomoki Nojiri (Japan) Nobuharu Matsushita	(Japan) Yuji Kunimoto (Japan) Sena Sakaguchi	(Japan) Tomoki Nojiri (Japan) Nobuharu Matsushita
4	Fuji Speedway	GT300	No. 65 K2 R&D LEON Racing	No. 65 K2 R&D LEON Racing	No. 65 K2 R&D LEON Racing
4	Fuji Speedway	GT300	(Japan) Naoya Gamou (Japan) Takuro Shinohara (Japan) Haruki Kurosawa	(Japan) Naoya Gamou (Japan) Takuro Shinohara (Japan) Haruki Kurosawa	(Japan) Naoya Gamou (Japan) Takuro Shinohara (Japan) Haruki Kurosawa
5	Sportsland Sugo	GT500	No. 38 TGR Team KeePer CERUMO	No. 39 TGR Team SARD	No. 37 TGR Team Deloitte TOM'S
5	Sportsland Sugo	GT500	(Japan) Hiroaki Ishiura (Japan) Toshiki Oyu	(Japan) Yuhi Sekiguchi (Japan) Yuichi Nakayama	(Japan) Ukyo Sasahara (France) Giuliano Alesi
5	Sportsland Sugo	GT300	No. 20 SHADE Racing	No. 31 apr	No. 65 K2 R&D LEON Racing
5	Sportsland Sugo	GT300	(Japan) Katsuyuki Hiranaka (Japan) Eijiro Shimizu	(Japan) Kazuto Kotaka (Japan) Jin Nakamura	(Japan) Naoya Gamou (Japan) Takuro Shinohara
6	Autopolis	GT500	No. 24 Kondo Racing	No. 23 NISMO	No. 39 TGR Team SARD
6	Autopolis	GT500	(Japan) Tsugio Matsuda (Japan) Teppei Natori	(Japan) Katsumasa Chiyo (Italy) Ronnie Quintarelli	(Japan) Yuhi Sekiguchi (Japan) Yuichi Nakayama
6	Autopolis	GT300	No. 6 Team LeMans	No. 65 K2 R&D LEON Racing	No. 88 JLOC
6	Autopolis	GT300	(Japan) Yoshiaki Katayama (Spain) Roberto Merhi Muntan	(Japan) Naoya Gamou (Japan) Takuro Shinohara	(Japan) Takashi Kogure (Japan) Yuya Motojima
7	Mobility Resort Motegi	GT500	No. 64 Modulo Nakajima Racing	No. 64 Modulo Nakajima Racing	No. 36 TGR Team au TOM'S
7	Mobility Resort Motegi	GT500	(Japan) Takuya Izawa (Japan) Riki Okusa	(Japan) Takuya Izawa (Japan) Riki Okusa	(Japan) Sho Tsuboi (Japan) Kenta Yamashita
7	Mobility Resort Motegi	GT300	No. 31 apr	No. 87 JLOC	No. 88 JLOC
7	Mobility Resort Motegi	GT300	(Japan) Kazuto Kotaka (Japan) Jin Nakamura	(Japan) Kosuke Matsuura (Japan) Natsu Sakaguchi	(Japan) Takashi Kogure (Japan) Yuya Motojima
8	Suzuka Circuit	GT500	No. 36 TGR Team au TOM'S	No. 24 Kondo Racing	No. 36 TGR Team au TOM'S
8	Suzuka Circuit	GT500	(Japan) Sho Tsuboi (Japan) Kenta Yamashita	(Japan) Tsugio Matsuda (Japan) Teppei Natori	(Japan) Sho Tsuboi (Japan) Kenta Yamashita
8	Suzuka Circuit	GT300	No. 87 JLOC	No. 31 apr	No. 87 JLOC
8	Suzuka Circuit	GT300	(Japan) Takashi Kogure (Japan) Yuya Motojima	(Japan) Kazuto Kotaka (Japan) Jin Nakamura (Japan) Yuki Nemoto	(Japan) Takashi Kogure (Japan) Yuya Motojima

== Championship standings ==
=== Drivers' championships ===
Race points

Position	1st	2nd	3rd	4th	5th	6th	7th	8th	9th	10th
Points	20	15	11	8	6	5	4	3	2	1

Qualifying points

Position	**1st**	**2nd**	**3rd**
Points	3	2	1

==== GT500 ====
Rank	Driver	Team	OKA	FUJ1	SUZ1	FUJ2	SUG (Note: Qualifying was canceled due to bad weather. The pole position was awarded according to the previous free practice result, but will not get points.)	AUT	MOT	SUZ2	Points
1	(Japan) Sho Tsuboi (Japan) Kenta Yamashita	No. 36 TGR Team au TOM'S	**1**^{1}	4	5	7	4	7	1^{3}	**1**^{1}	97
2	(Japan) Naoki Yamamoto (Japan) Tadasuke Makino	No. 100 Stanley Team Kunimitsu	3^{3}	7	7	2^{2}	5	4	6	4	64
3	(Japan) Mitsunori Takaboshi (Japan) Atsushi Miyake	No. 3 NISMO NDDP	6	1^{2}	8	12	6	3	7	7	54
4	(Japan) Hiroaki Ishiura (Japan) Toshiki Oyu	No. 38 TGR Team KeePer CERUMO	4	5	Ret	3	**2**^{1}	10	3	9	54
5	(Japan) Ukyo Sasahara (France) Giuliano Alesi	No. 37 TGR Team Deloitte TOM'S	7	11	**1**^{1}	10	1	8	Ret	11	51
6	(Japan) Kazuki Hiramine (Belgium) Bertrand Baguette	No. 12 Team Impul	11	6	4	5	3	5	11	3	47
7	(Japan) Yuhi Sekiguchi (Japan) Yuichi Nakayama	No. 39 TGR Team SARD	2^{2}	9	11	15	11	1	5	10	46
8	(Japan) Katsumasa Chiyo (Italy) Ronnie Quintarelli	No. 23 NISMO	5	2^{3}	10	13	12	2^{2}	9	8	45
9	(Japan) Tomoki Nojiri (Japan) Nobuharu Matsushita	No. 8 ARTA	8	14	Ret	**1**^{1}	15	11	2^{2}	12	43
10	(Japan) Koudai Tsukakoshi (Japan) Kakunoshin Ohta	No. 17 Astemo Real Racing	Ret	**3**^{1}	6	8	7	Ret	14†	2^{2}	43
11	(Japan) Kazuya Oshima (Japan) Nirei Fukuzumi	No. 14 TGR Team ENEOS ROOKIE	NC	8	2^{3}	4	9^{2}	9^{3}	13†	6^{3}	38
12	(Japan) Hiroki Otsu (Japan) Ren Sato	No. 16 ARTA	9	15	3^{2}	11	10	6	4	5	35
13	(Japan) Takuya Izawa (Japan) Riki Okusa	No. 64 Modulo Nakajima Racing	10	12	13	6^{3}	14	Ret	**10**^{1}	13	11
14	(Japan) Tsugio Matsuda (Japan) Teppei Natori	No. 24 Kondo Racing	12	13	9	14	13	**12**^{1}†	8	15	8
15	(Japan) Yuji Kunimoto (Japan) Sena Sakaguchi	No. 19 TGR Team WedsSport Bandoh	13	10	12	9	8^{3}	Ret	12	14	6
Rank	Driver	Team	OKA	FUJ1	SUZ1	FUJ2	SUG	AUT	MOT	SUZ2	Points

Colour	Result
Gold	Winner
Silver	Second place
Bronze	Third place
Green	Points classification
Blue	Non-points classification
Blue	Non-classified finish (NC)
Purple	Retired, not classified (Ret)
Red	Did not qualify (DNQ)
Red	Did not pre-qualify (DNPQ)
Black	Disqualified (DSQ)
White	Did not start (DNS)
White	Withdrew (WD)
White	Race cancelled (C)
Blank	Did not practice (DNP)
Blank	Did not arrive (DNA)
Blank	Excluded (EX)

**Bold** – Pole
Italics – Fastest Lap
† — Did not finish but classified

==== GT300 ====
Rank	Driver	Team	OKA	FUJ1	SUZ1	FUJ2	SUG	AUT	MOT	SUZ2	Points
1	(Japan) Takashi Kogure (Japan) Yuya Motojima	No. 88 JLOC	8	**1**^{1}	20	5	10	1	1	**1**^{1}	96
2	(Japan) Naoya Gamou (Japan) Takuro Shinohara	No. 65 K2 R&D LEON Racing	**2**^{1}	26	8	**1**^{1}	1	6	2	4	92
3	(Japan) Yuui Tsutsumi (Japan) Hibiki Taira	No. 2 muta Racing INGING	1^{2}	6	2^{3}	8	8	2	13	2^{3}	80
4	(Japan) Tomonobu Fujii	No. 777 D'station Racing	19	16	**1**^{1}	4	3^{3}	5^{3}	6	6	59
4	(United Kingdom) Charlie Fagg	No. 777 D'station Racing		16	**1**^{1}	4	3^{3}	5^{3}	6	6	59
5	(Japan) Seiji Ara (Germany) Niklas Krütten	No. 7 BMW M Team Studie × CRS	3	11	7	7	4	4	5^{2}	13	43
6	(Japan) Kazuto Kotaka (Japan) Jin Nakamura	No. 31 apr	5	5	4	12	6	14	**11**^{1}	3	39
7	(Japan) Daiki Sasaki (Brazil) João Paulo de Oliveira	No. 56 Kondo Racing	15	2^{3}	16	3	11	12^{2}	8	Ret	32
8	(Japan) Nobuteru Taniguchi (Japan) Tatsuya Kataoka	No. 4 Goodsmile Racing & TeamUKYO	9	4^{2}	12	2^{3}	20	16	10	10	30
9	(Japan) Hiroki Yoshida (Japan) Seita Nonaka	No. 52 Saitama Green Brave	4	3	5	23	DNS	18	7	11	29
10	(Japan) Yoshiaki Katayama (Spain) Roberto Merhi Muntan	No. 6 Team LeMans	10	13	3	9	Ret	**8**^{1}	9	5	28
11	(Japan) Kosuke Matsuura (Japan) Natsu Sakaguchi	No. 87 JLOC	7	8	21	6^{2}	7	13	4	Ret	26
12	(Japan) Kei Cozzolino (France) Lilou Wadoux	No. 45 PONOS Racing	11	9	6	11	2	24	15	21	22
13	(Japan) Morio Nitta (Japan) Shinichi Takagi	No. 96 K-tunes Racing	6	17	9	Ret	Ret	3	14	9	20
14	(Japan) Takashi Kobayashi (Japan) Syun Koide	No. 18 Team UpGarage	16	7	13	16	16	15	3^{3}	24	16
15	(Canada) Bruno Spengler	No. 7 BMW M Team Studie × CRS		11	7	7		4		13	16
16	(Japan) Takuto Iguchi (Japan) Hideki Yamauchi	No. 61 R&D Sport	26^{3}†	15	Ret^{2}	24	5^{2}	25†	Ret	7^{2}	15
17	(Japan) Ryuichiro Tomita (Japan) Keishi Ishikawa	No. 11 GAINER	WD	Ret	Ret	10	Ret	7	23†	8	8
18	(Japan) Hiroki Yoshimoto (Japan) Shunsuke Kohno	No. 60 LM corsa	12	20	10	14	9	10	12	14	4
19	(Japan) Katsuyuki Hiranaka (Japan) Eijiro Shimizu	No. 20 SHADE Racing	13	19	15	19	**Ret**^{1}	9	16	19	2
20	(Japan) Kohei Hirate (Japan) Yuya Hiraki	No. 62 HELM Motorsports	18	10	11	13	13	17	17	16	1
20	(Japan) Reiji Hiraki	No. 62 HELM Motorsports		10	11	13		17		16	1
—	(Japan) Haruki Kurosawa	No. 65 K2 R&D LEON Racing		26	8 (Note: Yuki Nemoto, and Haruki Kurosawa did not run during the race as a third driver and were ineligible for championship points.)	**1**^{1} (Note: Haruki Kurosawa did not participate in qualifying & not run during the race as a third driver and were ineligible for championship points.)		6 (Note: Haruki Kurosawa did not participate in qualifying & not run during the race as a third driver and were ineligible for championship points.)		4 (Note: Haruki Kurosawa, Yuki Nemoto, and Kazuki Oki did not participate in qualifying & not run during the race as a third driver and were ineligible for championship points.)	0
—	(Japan) Yuki Nemoto	No. 31 apr		5 (Note: Yuki Nemoto, and Yusuke Mitsui did not run during the race as a third driver and were ineligible for championship points.)	4	12		14		3	0
—	(Japan) Yusuke Mitsui	No. 18 Team UpGarage		7	13	16		15		24	0
—	(Japan) Kazuki Oki	No. 11 GAINER								8	0
—	(Japan) Takamitsu Matsui	No. 25 Hoppy Team Tsuchiya	14	23	18	Ret	Ret	11	Ret	15	0
—	(Japan) Togo Suganami	No. 25 Hoppy Team Tsuchiya	14	23	18	Ret		11	Ret	15	0
—	(Japan) Kimiya Sato	No. 25 Hoppy Team Tsuchiya		23	18	Ret	Ret	11		15	0
—	(Japan) Ryohei Sakaguchi (Japan) Yusuke Tomibayashi	No. 9 Pacific Racing Team	21	12	17	Ret	14	20	Ret	17	0
—	(Japan) Kiyoto Fujinami (Japan) Yusuke Shiotsu	No. 5 Team Mach	22	18	25	15	17	Ret	22†	12	0
—	(Japan) Takayuki Aoki	No. 360 Tomei Sports	20	21	23	17	12	21	18		0
—	(Japan) Takuya Otaki	No. 360 Tomei Sports	20	21	23	17	12	21		18	0
—	(Japan) Yuta Fujiwara	No. 9 Pacific Racing Team		12	17	Ret		20		17	0
—	(Brazil) Igor Omura Fraga (Japan) Yuga Furutani	No. 50 Anest Iwata Racing with Arnage	17	14	14	20	18	Ret	Ret	21	0
—	(Japan) Reimei Ito	No. 60 LM corsa								14	0
—	(Japan) Taiyo Ida	No. 48 NILZZ Racing	24	24	22	22	15	22	21	Ret	0
—	(Japan) Yusaku Shibata	No. 48 NILZZ Racing	24	24	22		15	22	21		0
—	(Japan) Rin Arakawa	No. 360 Tomei Sports		21	23	17			18	18	0
—	(Japan) Rikuto Kobayashi	No. 30 apr	23	22	19	18	21	19	19	20	0
—	(Japan) Manabu Orido	No. 30 apr		22	19	18		19	19	20	0
—	(Japan) Hiroaki Nagai	No. 30 apr	23	22	19	18	21	19		20	0
—	(Japan) Atsushi Tanaka	No. 360 Tomei Sports						21		18	0
—	(Japan) Hisashi Wada	No. 22 R'Qs Motor Sports	25	25	24	21	19	23	20	23	0
—	(Japan) Masaki Jyonai	No. 22 R'Qs Motor Sports		25	24		19		20		0
—	(Denmark) Marco Sørensen	No. 777 D'station Racing	19								0
—	(Japan) Miki Koyama	No. 22 R'Qs Motor Sports			24	21		23			0
—	(Japan) Takumi Sanada	No. 48 NILZZ Racing		24	22	22		22		Ret	0
—	(Japan) Takashi Ito	No. 48 NILZZ Racing				22				Ret	0
—	(Japan) Masaki Kano	No. 22 R'Qs Motor Sports	25	25				23		23	0
Rank	Driver	Team	OKA	FUJ1	SUZ1	FUJ2	SUG	AUT	MOT	SUZ2	Points

=== Teams' championships ===
Race points

Position	1st	2nd	3rd	4th	5th	6th	7th	8th	9th	10th
Points	20	15	11	8	6	5	4	3	2	1

Class	Lead Lap	-1 Lap	-2 Laps or more	
GT500	3	2	1	
	Lead Lap	-1 Lap	-2 Laps	-3 Laps or more
GT300	3		2	1

==== GT500 ====
Rank	Team	OKA	FUJ1	SUZ1	FUJ2	SUG	AUT	MOT	SUZ2	Points
1	No. 36 TGR Team au TOM'S	1^{1}	4^{1}	5^{1}	5^{1}	4^{1}	7^{1}	1^{1}	1^{1}	114
2	No. 100 Stanley Team Kunimitsu	3^{1}	7^{1}	7^{1}	2^{1}	5^{1}	4^{1}	6^{1}	4^{1}	85
3	No. 3 NISMO NDDP	6^{1}	1^{1}	8^{1}	12^{1}	6^{1}	3^{1}	7^{1}	7^{1}	76
4	No. 38 TGR Team KeePer CERUMO	4^{1}	5^{1}	Ret	3^{1}	2^{1}	10^{1}	3^{1}	9^{1}	75
5	No. 12 Team Impul	11^{2}	6^{1}	4^{1}	5^{1}	3^{1}	5^{1}	11^{1}	3^{1}	70
6	No. 37 TGR Team Deloitte TOM'S	7^{1}	11^{2}	1^{1}	10^{1}	1^{1}	8^{1}	Ret	11^{1}	68
7	No. 39 TGR Team SARD	2^{1}	4^{1}	12^{2}	15^{3}	11^{2}	1^{1}	5^{1}	10^{1}	64
8	No. 23 NISMO	5^{1}	2^{1}	10^{2}	13^{1}	12^{2}	2^{1}	9^{1}	8^{1}	64
9	No. 8 ARTA	8^{1}	14^{3}	Ret	1^{1}	15^{3}	11^{1}	2^{1}	12^{1}	55
10	No. 16 ARTA	9^{1}	15^{3}	3^{1}	11^{1}	10^{2}	6^{1}	4^{1}	5^{1}	54
11	No. 17 Astemo Real Racing	Ret	3^{1}	6^{1}	8^{1}	7^{1}	Ret	14^{3}	2^{1}	54
12	No. 14 TGR Team ENEOS ROOKIE	NC	8^{1}	2^{1}	4^{1}	9^{2}	9^{1}	13^{3}	6^{1}	53
13	No. 64 Modulo Nakajima Racing	10^{2}	12^{2}	13^{3}	6^{1}	14^{2}	Ret	10^{1}	14^{2}	22
14	No. 24 Kondo Racing	12^{2}	13^{2}	9^{1}	14^{2}	13^{2}	12^{3}	8^{1}	15^{2}	22
15	No. 19 TGR Team WedsSport Bandoh	13^{3}	10^{1}	11^{2}	9^{1}	8^{1}	Ret	12^{3}	14^{2}	21
Rank	Team	OKA	FUJ1	SUZ1	FUJ2	SUG	AUT	MOT	SUZ2	Points

==== GT300 ====
Rank	Team	OKA	FUJ1	SUZ1	FUJ2	SUG	AUT	MOT	SUZ2	Points
1	No. 88 JLOC	8^{1}	1^{1}	20^{2}	5^{1}	10^{1}	1^{1}	1^{1}	1^{1}	113
2	No. 65 K2 R&D LEON Racing	2^{1}	26^{3}	8^{1}	1^{1}	1^{1}	6^{1}	2^{1}	4^{1}	108
3	No. 2 muta Racing INGING	1^{1}	6^{1}	2^{1}	8^{1}	8^{1}	2^{1}	13^{1}	2^{1}	100
4	No. 777 D'station Racing	19^{2}	16^{3}	1^{1}	4^{1}	3^{1}	5^{1}	6^{1}	6^{1}	76
5	No. 7 BMW M Team Studie × CRS	3^{1}	11^{1}	7^{1}	7^{1}	4^{1}	4^{1}	5^{1}	13^{1}	65
7	No. 31 apr	5^{1}	5^{1}	4^{1}	12^{1}	6^{1}	12^{1}	11^{1}	3^{1}	60
6	No. 56 Kondo Racing	15^{1}	2^{1}	16^{2}	3^{1}	11^{1}	12^{1}	8^{1}	Ret	49
8	No. 4 Goodsmile Racing & TeamUKYO	9^{1}	4^{1}	12^{1}	2^{1}	20^{3}	16^{1}	10^{1}	10^{1}	49
9	No. 52 Saitama Green Brave	4^{1}	3^{1}	5^{1}	23^{3}	DNS	18^{2}	7^{1}	11^{1}	47
11	No. 45 PONOS Racing	11^{1}	9^{1}	6^{1}	11^{1}	2^{1}	12^{3}	12^{1}	22^{2}	44
10	No. 6 Team LeMans	10^{1}	13^{2}	3^{1}	9^{1}	Ret	8^{1}	9^{1}	5^{1}	44
11	No. 87 JLOC	7^{1}	8^{1}	21^{2}	6^{1}	7^{1}	13^{1}	4^{1}	Ret	44
13	No. 96 K-tunes Racing	6^{1}	17^{3}	9^{1}	Ret	Ret	3^{1}	14^{1}	9^{1}	33
14	No. 18 Team UpGarage	16^{2}	7^{1}	13^{2}	16^{1}	16^{3}	15^{1}	3^{1}	15^{3}	33
15	No. 60 LM corsa	12^{1}	20^{3}	10^{1}	14^{1}	9^{1}	10^{1}	12^{1}	14^{1}	26
16	No. 62 HELM Motorsports	18^{2}	10^{1}	11^{1}	13^{1}	13^{1}	17^{3}	17^{1}	16^{1}	21
17	No. 61 R&D Sport	26^{3}	15^{3}	Ret	24^{3}	5^{1}	25^{3}	Ret	7^{1}	20
18	No. 20 SHADE Racing	13^{1}	19^{1}	15^{2}	19^{2}	Ret	9^{1}	16^{1}	19^{1}	19
19	No. 11 GAINER	WD	Ret	Ret	10^{1}	Ret	7^{1}	23^{3}	8^{1}	18
20	No. 360 Tomei Sports	20^{2}	21^{3}	23^{3}	17^{2}	12^{1}	21^{2}	18^{2}	18^{1}	16
21	No. 30 apr	23^{3}	22^{3}	19^{2}	18^{2}	21^{3}	19^{2}	19^{2}	20^{1}	14
22	No. 25 Hoppy Team Tsuchiya	14^{1}	23^{3}	18^{2}	Ret	Ret	11^{1}	Ret	15^{1}	12
23	No. 9 Pacific Racing Team	21^{2}	12^{2}	17^{2}	Ret	14^{3}	20^{2}	Ret	17^{1}	12
24	No. 5 Team Mach	22^{3}	18^{3}	25^{3}	15^{1}	17^{2}	Ret	22^{3}	12^{1}	12
25	No. 50 Anest Iwata Racing with Arnage	17^{2}	14^{2}	14^{2}	20^{2}	18^{3}	Ret	Ret	21^{1}	12
26	No. 22 R'Qs Motor Sports	25^{3}	25^{3}	24^{3}	21^{2}	19^{3}	18^{1}	20^{2}	23^{2}	11
27	No. 48 NILZZ Racing	24^{3}	24^{3}	22^{3}	22^{3}	15^{3}	18^{2}	21^{3}	Ret	8
Rank	Team	OKA	FUJ1	SUZ1	FUJ2	SUG	AUT	MOT	SUZ2	Points
