= Kazuto Kotaka =

Japanese racing driver

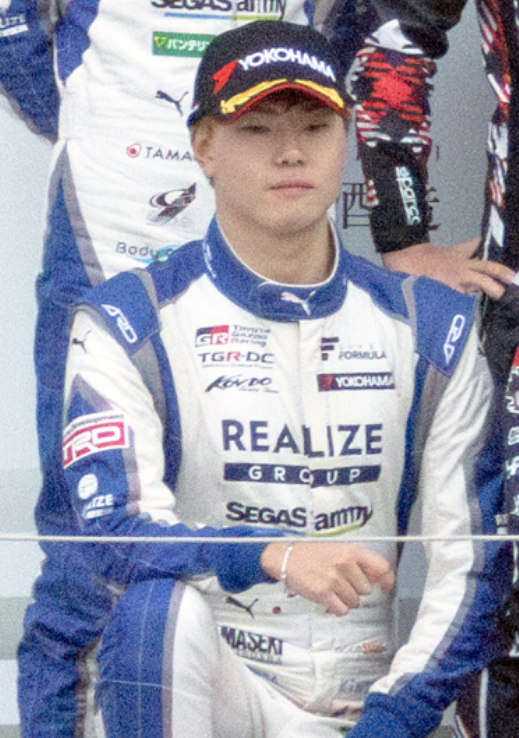
- Kotaka at Suzuka Circuit in November 2024
- Nationality: (Japan) Japanese
- Born: 17 April 1999 (age 27) Yamato, Kanagawa, Japan

Super GT - GT300 career
- Debut season: 2019
- Current team: apr
- Categorisation: FIA Gold
- Car number: 31
- Former teams: KCMG, Kondo Racing
- Starts: 34
- Wins: 0
- Podiums: 4
- Poles: 0
- Fastest laps: 0
- Best finish: 6th in 2024

Previous series
- 2023–2025 2020–2022 2019 2018–2019 2015–2018: Super Formula; Super Formula Lights; Toyota Racing Series; Formula 3 Japan; Formula 4 Japan

Championship titles
- 2022: Super Formula Lights

Kazuto Kotaka (小高一斗, Kotaka Kazuto; born 17 April 1999) is a Japanese racing driver for Toyota Gazoo Racing who currently competes in the Super GT for apr. He won the Super Formula Lights championship in 2022, and is a part of the TGR Driver Challenge Program. Kotaka has previously raced in the Super Formula Championship for Kondo Racing in 2023 and 2024, and for team TGR-DC in 2025.

== Career ==
=== Early career ===
Kotaka made his debut in formula racing in 2015, racing for TOM'S from the second race weekend in the F4 Japanese Championship. He regularly finished in the top-ten, with a fourth-place finish at the Suzuka International Racing Course as his best result. He finished sixth in the championship with 50 points.

In 2016, Kotaka remained active in Japanese Formula 4 with TOM'S. He won two races at Fuji Speedway and another at Sportsland SUGO. He later took another podium finish at Fuji, but achieved erratic results for the remainder of the season. He finished fifth overall with 113 points.

In 2017, Kotaka did not race, but in 2018 he returned to Japanese Formula 4 at TOM's. He missed the first race weekend, but nevertheless he won two races at Fuji and was on the podium in seven other races. With 188 points, he finished third in the standings behind Yuki Tsunoda and Teppei Natori. At the end of the season, he made his Japanese Formula 3 Championship debut with Hanashima Racing over the weekend at SUGO. He scored a point with sixth in the final race and was classified thirteenth in the final standings.

In 2019, Kotaka started the year in the New Zealand racing in the Toyota Racing Series with the team MTEC Motorsport. He took a podium finish in the season finale at the Manfeild: Circuit Chris Amon, finishing the season in tenth place with 176 points. He then made his debut as a full-time driver in Japanese Formula 3 with the Corolla Chukyo Kuo TOM'S team. He took five podiums: one at Suzuka, three at SUGO and one at the Twin Ring Motegi, but he also had to miss two race weekends. He finished fifth in the final standings with 48 points.

In 2020, Kotaka remained active in Japanese Formula 3, which had changed its name to Super Formula Lights, with the TOM'S team. He won one race in the final race weekend at Fuji and was on the podium in ten other races. With 73 points, he finished third in the final standings behind Ritomo Miyata and Sena Sakaguchi.

Kotaka still raced in Super Formula Lights in 2021, albeit only for one round, where he managed to get two podiums. For 2022, Kotaka stayed with TOM'S. He then won the title with eight wins and eleven podiums, as he beat Kakunoshin Ohta and Iori Kimura.

=== Super GT ===
==== GT300 ====
Kotaka made his debut in GT300 class for apr in Super GT for two races at Fuji Sweedway, sharing a Toyota GR Sport Prius PHV apr GT with Hiroaki Nagai and Manabu Orido, but scored no points. He also appeared in Non Championship round in Fuji Speedway, where he raced with McLaren 720S GT3 with Hanashima Racing alongside Katsuaki Kubota. Kotaka also competed full-time in the GT300 class of the Super GT with the team Advics muta Racing INGING, sharing a Toyota 86 MC GT300 with Ryohei Sakaguchi. The two took two pole positions at Fuji and two podiums at Suzuka and Fuji. They finished ninth in the championship with 34 points. For 2021 and 2022, he only appeared for three rounds with INGING and K-Tunes Racing for 2 races each respectively, and 2022 for apr with Koki Saga and Yuhki Nakayama.

Kotaka made his full season debut with apr number 31 new Lexus LC 500h GT alongside Saga and Yuki Nemoto where both claimed one podium. Kotaka continues with the same team, and paired with debutant Jin Nakamura.

During the 2025 season, he ran with Toyota Gazoo Racing in all races as the reserve driver for the GT500 class. He was registered as the third driver for TGR TEAM WedsSport Bandoh in the second round at Fuji and would also compete in the GT500 class.

=== Super Formula ===
In 2021 Kotaka would continue to drive in the 2021 Super Formula Lights at TOM'S. However, he missed the first two race weekends as he made his Super Formula debut that year with the carrozzeria Team KCMG as a replacement for Kamui Kobayashi, who was unable to fly to Japan due to travel restrictions due to the COVID-19 pandemic. He ended up competing in all but one round of the series, but didn't manage to score a single point.

After He won the Super Formula Lights title, he returns to the series in 2023 with Kondo Racing.

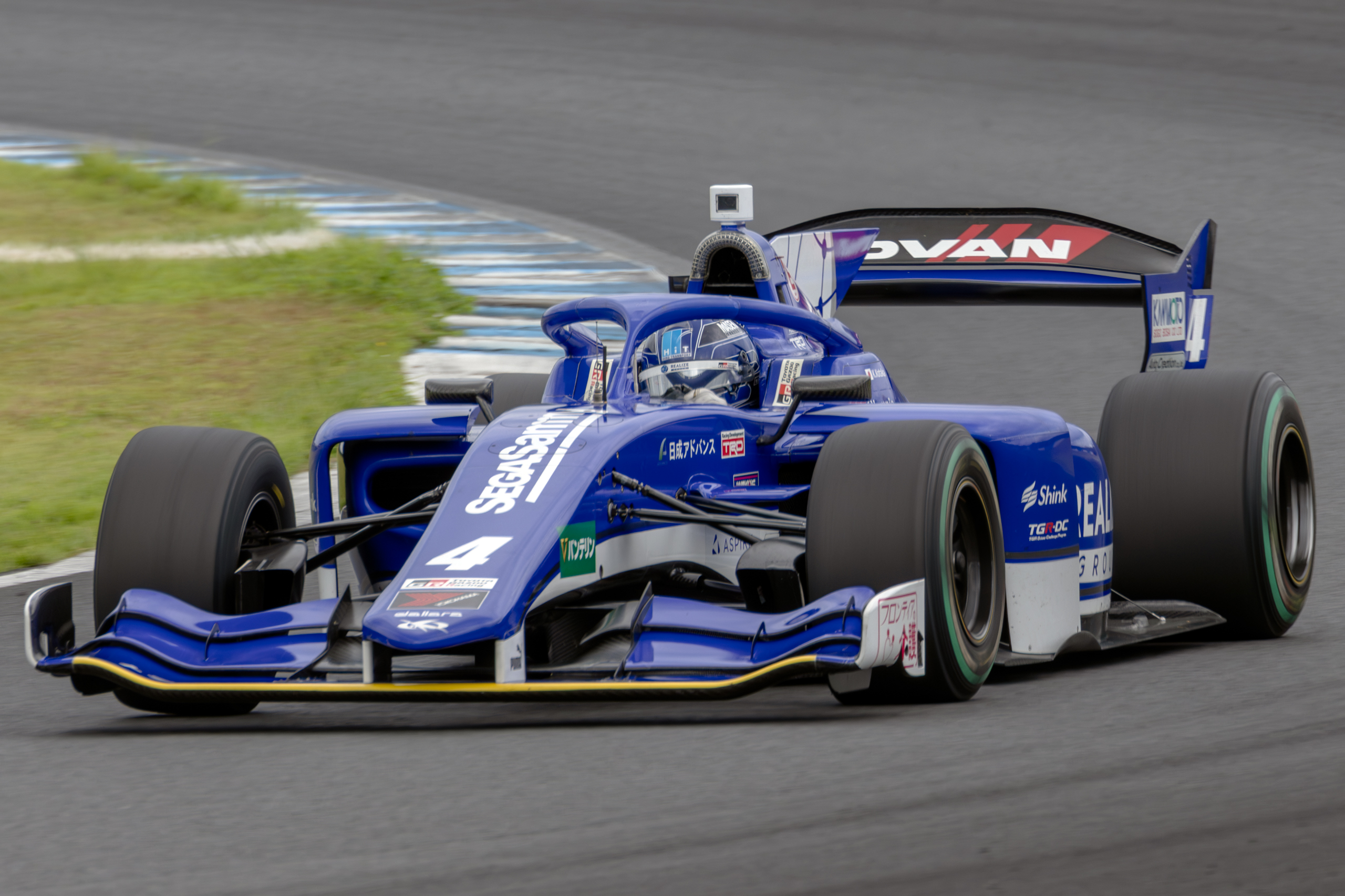
Kotaka at Mobility Resort Motegi in 2024

Kotaka then switch to rebranded TGMGP TGR-DC with Hibiki Taira as his team mate.

== Racing record ==
=== Career summary ===
Season	Series	Team	Races	Wins	Poles	FLaps	Podiums	Points	Position
2015	F4 Japanese Championship	TOM'S Spirit	12	0	0	1	0	50	6th
2016	F4 Japanese Championship	TOM'S Spirit	14	3	2	1	4	113	5th
2018	F4 Japanese Championship	TOM'S Spirit	12	2	0	3	9	188	**3rd**
2018	Japanese Formula 3 Championship	Hanashima Racing	4	0	0	0	0	1	13th
2019	Japanese Formula 3 Championship	Corolla Chukyo Kuo TOM'S	15	0	0	0	5	48	5th
2019	Super GT - GT300	apr	2	0	0	0	0	0	NC
2019	FIA Motorsport Games Formula 4 Cup	Team Japan	1	0	0	0	0	N/A	16th
2019	Toyota Racing Series	MTEC Motorsport	15	0	0	0	1	176	10th
2019	Super Taikyu - ST-4	T's Concept	5	0	0	0	0	46.5‡	8th‡
2020	Super Formula Lights	TOM'S	17	1	0	0	11	73	**3rd**
2020	Super GT - GT300	muta Racing INGING	7	0	2	0	2	34	9th
2020	Super Taikyu - ST-X	apr	5	0	0	0	1	79‡	5th‡
2021	Super Formula	carrozzeria Team KCMG	6	0	0	0	0	0	25th
2021	Super Formula Lights	TOM'S	3	0	0	0	2	14	8th
2021	Super GT - GT300	muta Racing INGING	1	0	0	0	0	3	26th
2021	Super GT - GT300	K-tunes Racing	2	0	0	0	0	3	26th
2021	Super Taikyu - ST-X	apr	6	0	1	2	2	64‡	5th‡
2022	Super Formula Lights	TOM'S	18	8	3	3	11	114	**1st**
2022	Super GT - GT300	apr	2	0	0	0	0	0	NC
2022	Super Taikyu - ST-X	apr	7	0	0	0	2	83‡	6th‡
2023	Super Formula	Kondo Racing	9	0	0	0	0	10	15th
2023	Super GT - GT300	apr	7	0	0	0	1	33	11th
2023	Super Taikyu - ST-X	apr	7	2	2	0	3	118‡	**2nd‡**
2024	Super Formula	Kondo Racing	9	0	0	0	0	4.5	14th
2024	Super GT - GT300	apr	8	0	1	2	1	39	6th
2024	Super Taikyu - ST-X	apr	6	1	1	0	5	116	4th‡
2024	Nürburgring Langstrecken-Serie - SP10	Toyota Gazoo Racing							
2025	Super Formula	KDDI TGMGP TGR-DC	12	0	0	0	0	0	20th
2025	Super GT - GT500	TGR Team WedsSport BANDOH	2	0	0	0	0	0	NC
2025	GT World Challenge Asia	Porsche Centre Okazaki	4	0	0	0	0	0	NC
2025	Intercontinental GT Challenge	Porsche Centre Okazaki	1	0	0	0	0	0	NC
2025	Intercontinental GT Challenge	Nordique Racing	1	0	0	0	0	0	NC
2025	GT World Challenge Europe Endurance Cup	Nordique Racing	3	0	0	0	0	0	NC
2025	Nürburgring Langstrecken-Serie - SP8T	Toyo Tires with Ring Racing							
2025	Nürburgring Langstrecken-Serie - SP8T	KCMG							
2026	Super GT - GT300	apr	8	0	0	0	2	41	17th
2026	Nürburgring Langstrecken-Serie - SP10	Toyo Tires with Ring Racing							
2026	GT World Challenge Asia	Porsche Centre Okazaki	9	0	0	0	0	4	38th

^{*} Season still in progress.
‡ Team standings

=== Complete F4 Japanese Championship results ===
(key) (Races in bold indicate pole position) (Races in italics indicate fastest lap)

Year	Team	1	2	3	4	5	6	7	8	9	10	11	12	13	14	DC	Pts
2015	TOM'S Spirit	OKA; 1	OKA; 2	FUJ1; 1; 10	FUJ1; 2; 13	FUJ2; 1; 6	FUJ2; 2; 5	SUZ; 1; 6	SUZ; 2; 4	SUG; 1; 6	SUG; 2; 7	AUT; 1; 8	AUT; 2; 6	MOT; 1; 16	MOT; 2; 11	6th	50
2016	TOM'S Spirit	OKA; 1; 10	OKA; 2; 10	FUJ1; 1; 1	FUJ1; 2; 1	**SUG**; **1** DSQ	**SUG**; **2**; 1	FUJ2; 1; 2	**FUJ2**; **2**; 25	FUJ2; 3; 16	SUZ; 1; 7	SUZ; 2 Ret	MOT; 1; 24	MOT; 2; 4	MOT; 3; 16	5th	113
2018	TOM'S Spirit	OKA; 1	OKA; 2	FUJ1; 1; 3	FUJ1; 2; 2	SUZ; 1; 2	SUZ; 2; 2	FUJ2; 1; 1	FUJ2; 2; 1	SUG; 1; 5	SUG; 2; 6	AUT; 1; 2	AUT; 2; 2	MOT; 1; 21	MOT; 2; 3	3rd	188

=== Complete Japanese Formula 3 Championship results ===
(key) (Races in bold indicate pole position; races in italics indicate fastest lap)

Year	Team	Engine	1	2	3	4	5	6	7	8	9	10	11	12	13	14	15	16	17	18	19	20	21	DC	Pts
2018	Hanashima Racing	Toyota TOM'S	SUZ; 1	SUZ; 2	SUG1; 1	SUG1; 2	FUJ1; 1	FUJ1; 2	OKA1; 1	OKA1; 2	OKA1; 3	MOT; 1	MOT; 2	MOT; 3	OKA2; 1	OKA2; 2	OKA2; 3	SUG2; 1; 7	SUG2; 2; 8	SUG2; 3 Ret	SUG2; 4; 6	FUJ2; 1	FUJ2; 2	13th	1
2019	Corolla Chukyo Kuo TOM'S	Toyota TOM'S	SUZ; 1; 4	SUZ; 2; 3	AUT; 1; 6	AUT; 2; 6	AUT; 3; 5	OKA; 1	OKA; 2	OKA; 3	SUG; 1; 2	SUG; 2; 4	FUJ; 1; 4	FUJ; 2; 5	SUG; 1; 3	SUG; 2; 4	SUG; 3; 3	MOT; 1 Ret	MOT; 2; 3	MOT; 3; 4	OKA; 1	OKA; 2		5th	48

=== Complete Toyota Racing Series results ===
(key) (Races in bold indicate pole position) (Races in italics indicate fastest lap)

Year	Team	1	2	3	4	5	6	7	8	9	10	11	12	13	14	15	16	17	DC	Points
2019	MTEC Motorsport	HIG; 1; 8	HIG; 2 Ret	HIG; 3; 6	TER; 1; 10	TER; 2 C	TER; 3 C	HMP; 1; 11	HMP; 2; 9	HMP; 3; 6	HMP; 4; 6	TAU; 1; 9	TAU; 2; 15	TAU; 3; 10	TAU; 4; 6	MAN; 1 Ret	MAN; 2; 10	MAN; 3; 3	10th	176

=== Complete FIA Motorsport Games results ===
Year	Entrant	Cup	Qualifying	Quali Race	Main race
2019	Team Japan	**Formula 4**	7th	DNF	16th

=== Complete Super GT results ===
(key) (Races in bold indicate pole position; races in italics indicate fastest lap)

Year	Team	Vehicle	Class	1	2	3	4	5	6	7	8	9	DC	Points
2019	apr	Toyota GR Sport Prius PHV apr GT	GT300	OKA	FUJ; 21	SUZ	CHA	FUJ; 25	AUT	SUG	MOT		NC	0
2020	Advics muta Racing INGING	Toyota 86 MC GT300	GT300	FUJ; 14	**FUJ**; 9	SUZ; 13	MOT; 16	**FUJ**; 7	SUZ; 2	MOT	FUJ; 3		9th	34
2021	muta Racing INGING	Toyota 86 MC GT300	GT300	OKA	FUJ; 10								26th	3
2021	K-tunes Racing	Lexus RC F GT3	GT300			MOT; 17	SUZ	SUG; 8	AUT	MOT	FUJ		26th	3
2022	apr	Toyota GR Sport Prius PHV apr GT	GT300	OKA	FUJ	SUZ	FUJ; 11	SUZ; 26	SUG	AUT	MOT		NC	0
2023	apr	Lexus LC 500h GT	GT300	OKA; 16	FUJ; 8	SUZ; 13	FUJ; 5	SUZ; 6	SUG; 11	AUT; 3	MOT; 4		11th	33
2024	apr	Lexus LC 500h GT	GT300	OKA; 5	FUJ; 5	SUZ; 4	FUJ; 12	SUG; 6	AUT; 14	**MOT**; **11^{1}**	SUZ; 3		6th	39
2025	TGR Team WedsSport BANDOH	Toyota GR Supra GT500	GT500	OKA	FUJ; 14	SEP	FS1	FS2	SUZ	SUG	AUT; 5†	MOT	NC	0
2026	apr	Lexus LC 500h GT	GT300	OKA; 3	FUJ; 3	FUJ; 14	SUZ; 11	SUG; 15	AUT; Ret	MOT; Ret	MOT; 15		17th	41

^{†} did not run during the race as a third driver and was ineligible for championship points.
^{‡} Half points awarded as less than 75% of race distance was completed.
^{(Number)} Driver did not take part in this sprint race, points are still awarded for the teammate's result.

=== Complete Super Formula Lights results ===
(key) (Races in bold indicate pole position) (Races in italics indicate fastest lap)

Year	Team	1	2	3	4	5	6	7	8	9	10	11	12	13	14	15	16	17	18	Pos	Points
2020	Corolla Chukyo Kuo TOM'S	MOT; 1; 4	MOT; 2; 2	MOT; 3; 3	OKA; 1; 7	OKA; 2; 3	SUG; 1; 3	SUG; 2; 5	SUG; 3; 3	AUT; 1 Ret	AUT; 2; 4	AUT; 3; 4	SUZ; 1; 3	SUZ; 2; 2	SUZ; 3; 3	FUJ; 1; 3	FUJ; 2; 1	FUJ; 3; 3		3rd	73
2021	TOM'S	FUJ; 1	FUJ; 2	FUJ; 3	SUZ; 1	SUZ; 2	SUZ; 3	AUT; 1	AUT; 2	AUT; 3	SUG; 1	SUG; 2	SUG; 3	MOT1; 1	MOT1; 2	MOT1; 3	MOT2; 1; 5	MOT2; 2; 2	MOT2; 3; 3	8th	14
2022	TOM'S	FUJ; 1; 4	**FUJ**; **2**; 1	FUJ; 3; 7	**SUZ**; **1**; 1	SUZ; 2; 2	SUZ; 3; 1	AUT; 1; 6	AUT; 2; 6	AUT; 3; 6	SUG; 1; 1	**SUG**; **2**; 1	SUG; 3; 1	MOT; 1; 1	MOT; 2; 4	MOT; 3; 2	OKA; 1; 3	OKA; 2; 1	OKA; 3; 4	1st	114

=== Complete Super Formula results ===
(key) (Races in bold indicate pole position; races in italics indicate fastest lap)

Year	Team	Engine	1	2	3	4	5	6	7	8	9	10	11	12	DC	Points
2021	carrozzeria Team KCMG	Toyota	FUJ; 15	SUZ; 16	AUT; 16†	SUG; 17	MOT; 14	MOT	SUZ; 18						25th	0
2023	Kondo Racing	Toyota	FUJ; 10	FUJ; 14	SUZ; 7	AUT; 19	SUG; 14	FUJ; 14	MOT; 6	SUZ; 15	SUZ; 12				15th	10
2024	Kondo Racing	Toyota	SUZ; Ret	AUT; 18	SUG; 8	FUJ; 17	MOT; 8	FUJ; 16	FUJ; 12	SUZ; Ret	SUZ; 19				14th	4.5
2025	KDDI TGMGP TGR-DC	Toyota	SUZ; Ret	SUZ; 18	MOT; 18	MOT; 15	AUT; 12	FUJ; 18	FUJ; 15	SUG; 14	FUJ; 15	SUZ; Ret	SUZ; 16	SUZ; 11	20th	0

^{*} Season still in progress.

Sporting positions
Preceded by Teppei Natori	Super Formula Lights; Champion; 2022	Succeeded by Iori Kimura
