= 2024 Porsche Carrera Cup Japan =

One-make motor racing season in Japan

The 2024 Porsche Carrera Cup Japan was the twenty-third season of the Porsche Carrera Cup Japan. The season started on 6 April at the Suzuka Circuit, and concluded at Sportsland SUGO on 10 November.

== Calendar ==
Round	Circuit	Date	Supporting
1	(Mie Prefecture) Suzuka Circuit, Suzuka	6–7 April	Formula One World Championship
2	(Shizuoka Prefecture) Fuji Speedway, Oyama	3–4 May	Super GT Series; F4 Japanese Championship
3	(Okayama Prefecture) Okayama International Circuit, Mimasaka	29–30 June	Formula Regional Japanese Championship; Okayama Challenge Cup
4	(Shizuoka Prefecture) Fuji Speedway, Oyama	20–21 July	Super Formula Championship; Super Formula Lights
5	(Shizuoka Prefecture) Fuji Speedway, Oyama	3–4 August	Super GT Series; F4 Japanese Championship
6	(Miyagi Prefecture) Sportsland Sugo, Murata	9–10 November	SUGO Champion Cup Race

== Entry list ==
Team	No.	Driver	Class	Rounds
(Japan) Hyper Water Racing	7	(Japan) Ryo Yamada	P	1–4
(Japan) Hyper Water Racing	7	(Japan) Yuta Kamimura	P	5
(Japan) Hyper Water Racing	17	(Japan) "Ikeda"	Am	1–5
(Japan) / Bingo Racing (Note: Car No. 9, No. 51, No. 66 & No. 88 entered as Bingo Racing, and No. 60 entered as Showa Auto with Bingo Racing); (Japan) / Showa Auto with Bingo Racing	9	(Japan) Shinji Takei	PA	All
(Japan) / Bingo Racing; (Japan) / Showa Auto with Bingo Racing	51	(South Korea) Tsugio Haruyama	Am	1–2, 4
(Japan) / Bingo Racing; (Japan) / Showa Auto with Bingo Racing	60	(Japan) Reimei Ito	P	All
(Japan) / Bingo Racing; (Japan) / Showa Auto with Bingo Racing	66	(Japan) Kiyoto Fujinami	P	1
(Japan) / Bingo Racing; (Japan) / Showa Auto with Bingo Racing	66	(Japan) "Bankcy"	Am	2–5
(Japan) / Bingo Racing; (Japan) / Showa Auto with Bingo Racing	88	(Chinese Taipei) Tiger Wu Chi-hsuan	Am	All
(Japan) Rn-sport	10	(Japan) "Motoki"	PA	All
(Japan) NGR	16	(Japan) "Hiro"	Am	All
(Japan) NK Racing	25	(Japan) Kiyoshi Uchiyama	PA	6
(Japan) Morerthan Racing	31	(Japan) "Ooka"	Am	2, 4
(China) Sky Motorsports	36	(Hong Kong) Sky Chen	Am	All
(Japan) Ponos Racing	45	(Japan) Yorikatsu Tsujiko	Am	1–4
(Japan) Ponos Racing	45	(Japan) Marino Sato	P	5
(Japan) CREF Motor Sport	45	(Japan) Masa Taga	Am	4, 6
(Japan) Opera90racing	90	(Japan) Ryosuke Kure	P	All
Porsche Japan	91	(Japan) Ryoma Henzan	P	All
(Japan) Bionic Jack Racing	98	(Japan) "Ikari"	PA	1, 3–4, 6
(Japan) Bionic Jack Racing	98	(Japan) Kenji Kabayashi	Am	2, 5
Privateer	77	(Japan) Masaru Hamasaki	PA	All

Icon	Class
P	Pro Cup
PA	Pro-Am Cup
Am	Am Cup
	Guest drivers ineligible to score points

== Results ==
Round		Circuit	Pole position	Overall winner	Pro-Am Winner	Am Winner
1	R1	(Mie Prefecture) Suzuka Circuit	(Japan) Reimei Ito	(Japan) Reimei Ito	(Japan) Shinji Takei	(Chinese Taipei) Tiger Wu Chi-hsuan
2	R1	(Shizuoka Prefecture) Fuji Speedway	(Japan) Reimei Ito	(Japan) Reimei Ito	(Japan) Shinji Takei	(Chinese Taipei) Tiger Wu Chi-hsuan
2	R2	(Shizuoka Prefecture) Fuji Speedway	(Japan) Reimei Ito	(Japan) Reimei Ito	(Japan) "Motoki"	(Chinese Taipei) Tiger Wu
3	R1	(Okayama Prefecture) Okayama International Circuit	(Japan) Reimei Ito	(Japan) Reimei Ito	(Japan) Shinji Takei	(Chinese Taipei) Tiger Wu Chi-hsuan
3	R2	(Okayama Prefecture) Okayama International Circuit	(Japan) Reimei Ito	(Japan) Reimei Ito	(Japan) "Motoki"	(Japan) "Bankcy"
4	R1	(Shizuoka Prefecture) Fuji Speedway	(Japan) Reimei Ito	(Japan) Reimei Ito	(Japan) Shinji Takei	(Chinese Taipei) Tiger Wu Chi-hsuan
4	R2	(Shizuoka Prefecture) Fuji Speedway	(Japan) Reimei Ito	(Japan) Reimei Ito	(Japan) Shinji Takei	(Chinese Taipei) Tiger Wu Chi-hsuan
5	R1	(Shizuoka Prefecture) Fuji Speedway	(Japan) Reimei Ito	(Japan) Reimei Ito	(Japan) Shinji Takei	(Chinese Taipei) Tiger Wu Chi-hsuan
5	R2	(Shizuoka Prefecture) Fuji Speedway	(Japan) Reimei Ito	(Japan) Reimei Ito	(Japan) Shinji Takei	(Japan) "Hiro"
6	R1	(Miyagi Prefecture) Sportsland Sugo	(Japan) Reimei Ito	(Japan) Reimei Ito	(Japan) "Motoki"	(Chinese Taipei) Tiger Wu Chi-hsuan
6	R2	(Miyagi Prefecture) Sportsland Sugo	(Japan) Reimei Ito	(Japan) Ryoma Henzan	(Japan) "Motoki"	(Chinese Taipei) Tiger Wu Chi-hsuan

== Championship standings ==
=== Scoring system ===
Points were awarded to the top fifteen classified drivers in every race, using the following system:

Position	1st	2nd	3rd	4th	5th	6th	7th	8th	9th	10th	11th	12th	13th	14th	15th
Points	25	20	17	14	12	10	9	8	7	6	5	4	3	2	1

=== Overall ===
Pos.	Driver	SUZ	FUJ1		OKA		FUJ2		FUJ3		SUG		Points
Pos.	Driver	R1	R1	R2	R1	R2	R1	R2	R1	R2	R1	R2	Points
1	(Japan) Reimei Ito	1	1	1	1	1	1	1	1	1	1	2	257.5
2	(Japan) Ryoma Henzan	4	3	3	4	3	4	3	4	3	2	1	176
3	(Japan) Ryosuke Kure	8	4	4	2	Ret	3	4	2	5	3	3	147
4	(Japan) Ryo Yamada	2	2	2	3	2	2	2					137
5	(Japan) Shinji Takei	5	5	12	5	5	5	5	6	6	5	6	116
6	(Japan) "Motoki"	12	7	5	6	4	6	6	7	7	4	4	110.5
7	(Chinese Taipei) Tiger Wu Chi-hsuan	9	6	6	8	8	8	7	8	10	7	7	88
8	(Japan) Masaru Hamasaki	6	8	7	7	6	7	14	9	11	8	8	85.5
9	(Japan) "Bankcy"		15	8	9	7	9	9	11	9			48.5
10	(Japan) "Hiro"	Ret	11	13	14	12	13	12	10	8	Ret	11	42
11	(Japan) "Ikeda"	10	9	10	13	11	16	13	13	12			39
12	(Hong Kong) Sky Chen	13	12	14	12	10	11	10	13	Ret			37
13	(Japan) "Ikari"	7			11	DNS	Ret	8			Ret	9	30
14	(Japan) Yorikatsu Tsujiko	11	Ret	11	10	9	12	Ret					29
15	(Japan) Yuta Kamimura								3	6			27
16	(Japan) Marino Sato								5	3			20.5
17	(Japan) Kiyoto Fujinami	3											17
18	(Japan) Kenji Kabayashi		13	15					14	13			9.5
19	(South Korea) Tsugio Haruyama	Ret	14	16			15	15					9
Guest drivers ineligible to score points
—	(Japan) Kiyoshi Uchiyama										6	5	0
—	(Japan) "Ooka"		10	9			14	Ret					0
—	(Japan) Masa Taga						10	11			Ret	10	0
Pos.	Driver	R1	R1	R2	R1	R2	R1	R2	R1	R2	R1	R2	Points
Pos.	Driver	SUZ	FUJ1		OKA		FUJ2		FUJ3		SUG		Points

=== Pro-Am ===
Pos.	Driver	SUZ	FUJ1		OKA		FUJ2		FUJ3		SUG		Points
Pos.	Driver	R1	R1	R2	R1	R2	R1	R2	R1	R2	R1	R2	Points
1	(Japan) Shinji Takei	1	1	3	1	2	1	1	1	1	2	3	239.5
2	(Japan) "Motoki"	4	2	1	2	1	2	2	2	2	1	1	224
3	(Japan) Masaru Hamasaki	2	3	2	3	3	3	4	3	3	4	4	181.5
4	(Japan) "Ikari"	3			4	DNS	Ret	3			Ret	5	62
Guest drivers ineligible to score points
—	(Japan) Kiyoshi Uchiyama										3	2	0
Pos.	Driver	R1	R1	R2	R1	R2	R1	R2	R1	R2	R1	R2	Points
Pos.	Driver	SUZ	FUJ1		OKA		FUJ2		FUJ3		SUG		Points

=== Am ===
Pos.	Driver	SUZ	FUJ1		OKA		FUJ2		FUJ3		SUG		Points
Pos.	Driver	R1	R1	R2	R1	R2	R1	R2	R1	R2	R1	R2	Points
1	(Chinese Taipei) Tiger Wu Chi-hsuan	1	1	1	1	2	1	1	1	3	1	1	253.5
2	(Japan) "Bankcy"		8	2	2	1	2	9	3	6			141
3	(Japan) "Hiro"	Ret	4	6	6	6	5	4	2	1	Ret	3	127.5
4	(Japan) "Ikeda"	2	3	4	5	5	7	5	5	4			121
5	(Hong Kong) Sky Chen	4	5	7	4	4	3	3	4	Ret			114
6	(Japan) Yorikatsu Tsujiko	3	Ret	4	3	3	4	Ret					79
7	(South Korea) Tsugio Haruyama	Ret	7	9			6	6					38
8	(Japan) Kenji Kabayashi		6	8					6	10			9.5
Guest drivers ineligible to score points
—	(Japan) "Ooka"		2	3			7	Ret					0
—	(Japan) Masa Taga						3	4			Ret	2	0
Pos.	Driver	R1	R1	R2	R1	R2	R1	R2	R1	R2	R1	R2	Points
Pos.	Driver	SUZ	FUJ1		OKA		FUJ2		FUJ3		SUG		Points

=== Team ranking ===
Pos.	Team	Pts
1	Bingo Racing	383.5
2	Hyper Water Racing	203

== See also ==
- 2024 Porsche Supercup
- 2024 Porsche Carrera Cup Asia
- 2024 Porsche Carrera Cup France
- 2024 Porsche Carrera Cup Germany
- 2024 Porsche Carrera Cup North America
- 2024 Porsche Carrera Cup Australia
