= HELM Motorsports =

Japanese racing team

HELM Motorpsorts
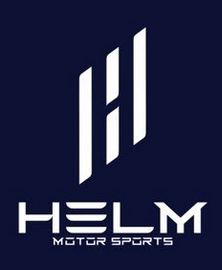
- Founded: 2020
- Base: Mito, Ibaraki Prefecture
- Team principal(s): Hideo Fukuyama
- Founder(s): Yuya Hiraki; Reiji Hiraki
- Current series: Super GT; F4 Japanese Championship; Formula Regional Japanese Championship
- Former series: Super Formula Lights; Super Taikyu
- Current drivers: Super GT - GT300: Yuya Hiraki; Reiji Hiraki; F4 Japanese Championship: William Sakai; Tosei Moriyama; Yutaka Toriba; Hirobon; Formula Regional Japanese Championship: Anna Inotsume
- Teams' Championships: Super Taikyu: 1 (2022)
- Drivers' Championships: Super Taikyu: 1 (2022)
- Website: helm-ms.co.jp

HELM Motorpsorts is a racing team founded and owned by racing driver brothers Yuya and Reiji Hiraki. The team competes in the GT300 class of Super GT as well as in F4 Japanese Championship, and Formula Regional Japanese Championship. The team also competed before in Super Taikyu, and won the title in 2022.

== History ==
=== F4 Japanese Championship ===
HELM Motorsports first competed in F4 Japanese Championship in 2020 with Reiji Hiraki. Hiraki took two wins, and couple of podiums in that season, placed him in second behind Hibiki Taira. HELM also raced in the independent class with Yutaka Toriba won the title in 2022.

=== Super Formula Lights, Formula Regional ===
In 2022, HELM Motorsports joined Super Formula Lights, with the Hiraki brothers of Yuya & Reiji competing with TOMEI Engines. They only managed to race in the first 4 rounds before withdrawing from the 5th round and missing the season finale. Since then the team hasn't competed in the series.

In 2023, HELM made their debut in Formula Regional Japanese Championship with Yuya Hiraki winning a race.

For 2024, HEL Motorsports recruited TCR Japan champion Anna Inotsume to drive.

=== Super Taikyu ===
HELM Motorsports made their debut in 2022 in Super Taikyu ST-X Class. Yuya, Reiji Hiraki as the drivers, with Yutaka Toriba as the third driver. In that season, they won the ST-X Class.

=== Super GT – GT300 ===
HELM Motorsports are set to make their debut in the GT300 class of Super GT in 2024. With Kohei Hirate as the main driver, alongside Yuya Hiraki, and Reiji Hiraki as the third driver.

==== Complete Super GT results ====
Year	Drivers	Car	Class	1	2	3	4	5	6	7	8	DC	Pts
2024	(Japan) Kohei Hirate (Japan) Yuya Hiraki (Japan) Reiji Hiraki	Nissan GT-R Nismo GT3	GT300	OKA; 18	FUJ; 10	SUZ; 11	FUJ; 13	SUG; 13	AUT; 17	MOT; 17	SUZ; 16	20th	21
