= 2016 F4 Japanese Championship =

Motor racing competition

The 2016 F4 Japanese Championship season was the second season of the F4 Japanese Championship. It began on 9 April in Okayama and finished on 13 November on Twin Ring Motegi after fourteen races held across six rounds.

== Teams and drivers ==
Team	No.	Driver	Rounds
(Japan) Yuichi Sasaki	2	(Japan) Yuichi Sasaki	2–4, 6
(Japan) Sutekina Racing Team	3	(Japan) Yuki Urata	1–2
(Japan) Sutekina Racing Team	3	(Japan) Miku Ikejima	3–4, 6
(Japan) Sutekina Racing Team	3	(Japan) Yuki Tsunoda	5
(Japan) Field Motorsport	4	(Japan) Shunsuke Kohno	All
(Japan) Field Motorsport	25	(Japan) Tomoki Takahashi	All
(Japan) Field Motorsport	55	(Japan) Takashi Hata	1–2, 4–5
(Japan) Field Motorsport	75	(Japan) Yuya Tezuka	4
(Japan) Honda Formula Dream Project	7	(Japan) Mizuki Ishizaka	All
(Japan) Honda Formula Dream Project	8	(Japan) Yuta Kamimura	All
(Japan) Honda Formula Dream Project	9	(Japan) Sena Sakaguchi	All
(Japan) Honda Formula Dream Project	10	(Japan) Takuya Otaki	All
(Japan) Rn-sports	11	(Japan) Toshiki Oyu	All
(Japan) B-MAX Racing Team	13	(Japan) Motoyoshi Yoshida	1–2, 4–6
(Japan) B-MAX Racing Team	13	(Japan) "Syuji"	3
(Japan) B-MAX Racing Team	50	(Japan) Shinji Sawada	All
(Hong Kong) KCMG	14	(Japan) Yuki Nemoto	All
(Japan) CMS Motorsports Project	15	(Japan) Yuga Katsumata	2–6
(Japan) Media Do Kageyama Racing	16	(Japan) Takuro Shinohara	All
(Japan) Buzz International	17	(Japan) Hiroki Inui	1
(Japan) Buzz International	17	(Japan) Junpei Kato	2–6
(Japan) Buzz International	18	(Japan) Shigetomo Shimono	1–5
(Japan) Buzz International	18	(Japan) Yuki Urata	6
(Italy) VSR Lamborghini S.C. Formula Jr.	19	(Japan) Rikiya Kanazawa	6
(Italy) VSR Lamborghini S.C. Formula Jr.	63	(South Korea) Do Yun Hwang	All
(Japan) RSS	21	(Japan) "Dragon"	1–5
(Japan) RSS	21	(Japan) Seiya Jin	6
(Japan) N-SPEED	23	(Japan) "Yugo"	All
(Japan) Eagle Sport	29	(Japan) Turbo Asahi	All
(Japan) Eagle Sport	30	(Japan) Kuninori Nakane	All
(Japan) miNami aoYama Project	32	(Japan) Ayaka Imahashi	1–2
(Japan) miNami aoYama Project	33	(Japan) Miki Koyama	1
(Japan) miNami aoYama Project	33	(Japan) Miku Ikejima	2
(Japan) TOM'S Spirit	36	(Japan) Ritomo Miyata	All
(Japan) TOM'S Spirit	37	(Japan) Kazuto Kotaka	All
(Japan) Garage Chabatake	38	(Japan) Satoshi Anbe	2, 4
(Japan) Garage Chabatake	58	(Japan) Takuma Abe	All
(Japan) Team Right Way	47	(Japan) Takahiro Ban	6
(Japan) Silver Star Racing	51	(Japan) Kotoka Goibuchi	2–3
(Japan) Silver Star Racing	51	(South Korea) Lee Jung Woo	5
(Japan) Silver Star Racing	51	(Japan) Kohei Tokumasu	6
(Japan) Saitama Toyopet GreenBrave	52	(Japan) Hiroki Kokuzawa	1–4
(Japan) Saitama Toyopet GreenBrave	52	(Japan) Miki Koyama	6
(Japan) Le Beausset Motorsports	60	(Japan) Kohta Kawaai	All
(Japan) Le Beausset Motorsports	61	(Japan) Reiji Hiraki	All
(Japan) Le Beausset Motorsports	62	(Japan) Yuya Hiraki	All
(Japan) Skill Speed	66	(Japan) Riku Hashimoto	All
(Japan) leprix sport	70	(Japan) Yuya Taira	All
(Japan) Reon Kids Racing	73	(Japan) Kotoka Goibuchi	6
(Japan) Team Plus 10 ・ NRS	83	(Japan) Ryosuke Takehira	All
(Japan) Zap Speed Racing Team	86	(Japan) Toshihiko Hachiro (Japan) "Osaka Hachiro"	1–2, 4; 5–6
(Japan) Succeed Sports	88	(Japan) Shintaro Kawabata	All
(Japan) Succeed Sports	89	(Japan) Ryota Kiyohara	1–3

== Race calendar and results ==
All rounds were held in Japan and were part of the Super GT events. The Autopolis round, initially scheduled for May 22nd, has been cancelled in the aftermath of the 2016 Kumamoto earthquakes. On July 1, it was finally decided that one of the cancelled races will be held at the fourth round at Fuji and the other at the season finale at Motegi, both rounds becoming triple-header rounds.

Round		Circuit	Date	Pole position	Fastest lap	Winning driver	Winning team
1	R1	Okayama International Circuit, Mimasaka	9 April	(Japan) Shintaro Kawabata	(Japan) Sena Sakaguchi	(Japan) Shintaro Kawabata	(Japan) Succeed Sports
1	R2	Okayama International Circuit, Mimasaka	10 April	(Japan) Shintaro Kawabata	(Japan) Mizuki Ishizaka	(Japan) Shintaro Kawabata	(Japan) Succeed Sports
2	R1	Fuji Speedway, Oyama	3 May	(Japan) Ritomo Miyata	(Japan) Shintaro Kawabata	(Japan) Kazuto Kotaka	(Japan) TOM'S Spirit
2	R2	Fuji Speedway, Oyama	4 May	(Japan) Shinji Sawada	(Japan) Kazuto Kotaka	(Japan) Kazuto Kotaka	(Japan) TOM'S Spirit
3	R1	Sportsland SUGO, Murata	23 July	(Japan) Kazuto Kotaka	(Japan) Toshiki Oyu	(Japan) Toshiki Oyu	(Japan) Rn-sports
3	R2	Sportsland SUGO, Murata	24 July	(Japan) Kazuto Kotaka	(Japan) Kazuto Kotaka	(Japan) Kazuto Kotaka	(Japan) TOM'S Spirit
4	R1	Fuji Speedway, Oyama	6 August	(Japan) Ritomo Miyata	(Japan) Takuro Shinohara	(Japan) Ritomo Miyata	(Japan) TOM'S Spirit
4	R2	Fuji Speedway, Oyama	7 August	(Japan) Kazuto Kotaka	(Japan) Tomoki Takahashi	(Japan) Ritomo Miyata	(Japan) TOM'S Spirit
4	R3	Fuji Speedway, Oyama	7 August	(Japan) Takuro Shinohara	(Japan) Ritomo Miyata	(Japan) Yuya Hiraki	(Japan) Le Beausset Motorsports
5	R1	Suzuka Circuit, Suzuka	27 August	(Japan) Takuya Otaki	(Japan) Sena Sakaguchi	(Japan) Takuya Otaki	(Japan) Honda Formula Dream Project
5	R2	Suzuka Circuit, Suzuka	28 August	(Japan) Toshiki Oyu	(Japan) Toshiki Oyu	(Japan) Toshiki Oyu	(Japan) Rn-sports
6	R1	Twin Ring Motegi, Motegi	12 November	(Japan) Toshiki Oyu	(Japan) Takuro Shinohara	(Japan) Kohta Kawaai	(Japan) Le Beausset Motorsports
6	R2	Twin Ring Motegi, Motegi	12 November	(Japan) Toshiki Oyu	(Japan) Ritomo Miyata	(Japan) Sena Sakaguchi	(Japan) Honda Formula Dream Project
6	R3	Twin Ring Motegi, Motegi	13 November	(Japan) Takuro Shinohara	(Japan) Ritomo Miyata	(Japan) Yuya Hiraki	(Japan) Le Beausset Motorsports

== Championship standings ==
Only the best thirteen results counts towards the championship. Points are awarded to the top 10 classified finishers in each race. No points are awarded for pole position or fastest lap.

Position	**1st**	**2nd**	**3rd**	**4th**	**5th**	**6th**	**7th**	**8th**	**9th**	**10th**
Points	25	18	15	12	10	8	6	4	2	1

=== Drivers' standings ===
Pos	Driver	OKA		FUJ1		SUG		FUJ2			SUZ		MOT			Points
1	(Japan) Ritomo Miyata	5	Ret	**Ret**	2	DSQ	2	**1**	1	4	6	6	22	2	11	142
2	(Japan) Sena Sakaguchi	2	Ret	3	4	Ret	9	3	2	3	24	2	Ret	1	15	138
3	(Japan) Toshiki Oyu	8	4	Ret	14	1	4	6	4	24	4	**1**	**13**	**3**	10	126
4	(Japan) Mizuki Ishizaka	4	3	5	25	2	18	4	5	5	5	7	26	8	4	119
5	(Japan) Kazuto Kotaka	10	10	1	1	**DSQ**	**1**	2	**25**	16	7	Ret	24	4	16	113
6	(Japan) Yuya Hiraki	Ret	5	15	8	4	5	10	14	1	8	11	3	18	1	106
7	(Japan) Shinji Sawada	6	16	2	**3**	15	14	5	28	Ret	3	3	5	13	3	106
8	(Japan) Takuro Shinohara	12	9	4	15	10	12	7	3	**2**	15	12	Ret	6	**2**	80
9	(Japan) Shintaro Kawabata	**1**	**1**	Ret	Ret	Ret	6	28	8	6	12	8	15	26	8	78
10	(Japan) Shunsuke Kohno	7	Ret	Ret	5	6	Ret	9	6	26	13	9	2	11	5	64
11	(Japan) Kohta Kawaai	Ret	6	8	7	5	10	14	13	27	25	14	1	9	Ret	56
12	(Japan) Takuya Otaki	Ret	15	33	19	8	13	8	11	Ret	**1**	30	8	5	6	55
13	(Japan) Yuki Nemoto	9	7	6	6	Ret	3	Ret	7	19	10	10	20	7	13	53
14	(Japan) Yuta Kamimura	3	2	9	10	7	Ret	12	9	28	14	21	Ret	10	18	45
15	(Japan) Tomoki Takahashi	11	14	7	29	3	8	13	22	18	26	5	14	14	7	41
16	(Japan) Yuki Tsunoda										2	4				30
17	(Japan) Yuya Taira	16	18	16	28	19	11	24	24	Ret	9	13	4	Ret	27	14
18	(Japan) Turbo Asahi	14	8	10	9	22	21	Ret	18	9	Ret	17	Ret	16	20	9
19	(Japan) Yuki Urata	22	30	13	Ret								6	32	Ret	8
20	(Japan) Reiji Hiraki	25	13	12	11	Ret	7	32	23	Ret	11	20	21	12	9	8
21	(Japan) Takuma Abe	30	27	20	24	12	26	Ret	12	7	17	28	12	DSQ	DSQ	6
22	(Japan) Junpei Kato			17	16	14	22	19	15	Ret	19	15	7	20	17	6
23	(Japan) Yuga Katsumata			22	Ret	17	20	15	Ret	8	22	22	32	DNS	DNS	4
24	(Japan) Ryota Kiyohara	13	12	11	13	9	15									2
25	(Japan) Seiya Jin												9	24	19	2
26	(Japan) Riku Hashimoto	19	20	19	Ret	18	16	18	21	10	18	16	23	Ret	26	1
27	(Japan) Ryosuke Takehira	20	21	23	Ret	13	19	11	20	Ret	23	19	10	15	12	1
28	(Japan) Yuya Tezuka							23	10	Ret						1
29	(Japan) Rikiya Kanazawa												11	19	14	0
30	(Japan) "Dragon"	18	24	18	17	11	29	21	19	Ret	21	23				0
31	(Japan) Miku Ikejima			24	20	21	20	20	17	11			27	25	Ret	0
32	(Japan) Miki Koyama	Ret	11										28	21	24	0
33	(Japan) Hiroki Kokuzawa	31	23	14	32	16	30	16	26	12						0
34	(South Korea) Do Yun Hwang	17	25	28	12	Ret	Ret	17	27	21	29	24	18	Ret	21	0
35	(Japan) Yuichi Sasaki			30	22	23	23	26	31	13			Ret	27	28	0
36	(Japan) Kuninori Nakane	26	26	29	26	24	Ret	29	29	14	27	27	25	28	Ret	0
37	(Japan) Shigetomo Shimono	15	17	21	18	17	24	Ret	16	22	16	18				0
38	(Japan) Motoyoshi Yoshida	27	28	27	27			27	32	15	30	29	29	29	31	0
39	(Japan) Kohei Tokumasu												19	17	22	0
40	(Japan) Kotoka Goibuchi			25	21	26	25						17	22	23	0
41	(Japan) Satoshi Anbe			26	30			22	35	17						0
42	(Japan) Hiroki Inui	23	19													0
43	(South Korea) Lee Jung Woo										20	26				0
44	(Japan) Toshihiko Hachiro (Japan) "Osaka Hachiro"	29	31	32	31			31	34	20	32	31	30	30	29	0
45	(Japan) Takashi Hata	21	Ret	Ret	Ret			25	30	23	28	25				0
46	(Japan) Ayaka Imahashi	24	22	Ret	Ret											0
47	(Japan) "Yugo"	28	29	31	23	27	28	30	33	25	31	Ret	31	31	30	0
48	(Japan) "Syuji"					25	27									0
Pos	Driver	OKA		FUJ1		SUG		FUJ2			SUZ		MOT			Points

Colour	Result
Gold	Winner
Silver	Second place
Bronze	Third place
Green	Points classification
Blue	Non-points classification
Blue	Non-classified finish (NC)
Purple	Retired, not classified (Ret)
Red	Did not qualify (DNQ)
Red	Did not pre-qualify (DNPQ)
Black	Disqualified (DSQ)
White	Did not start (DNS)
White	Withdrew (WD)
White	Race cancelled (C)
Blank	Did not practice (DNP)
Blank	Did not arrive (DNA)
Blank	Excluded (EX)

**Bold** – Pole
Italics – Fastest Lap
† — Did not finish, but classified

=== Teams' standings ===
Pos	Team	Pts.
1	(Japan) Honda Formula Dream Project	203
2	(Japan) TOM'S Spirit	182
3	(Japan) Rn-sports	125
4	(Japan) Le Beausset Motorsports	99
5	(Japan) B-Max Racing Team	91
6	(Japan) Field Motorsport	79
7	(Japan) Succeed Sports	76
8	(Japan) Media Do Kageyama Racing	63
9	(Hong Kong) KCMG	53
10	(Japan) Sutekina Racing Team	30
11	(Japan) Leprix Sport	14
12	(Japan) Eagle Sport	9
13	(Japan) Buzz International	8
14	(Japan) Garage Chabatake	6
15	(Japan) CMS Motorsports Project	4
16	(Japan) RSS	2
17	(Japan) Skill Speed	1
18	(Japan) Team Plus 10 NRS	1
