= 2025 Fuji GT Sprint =

Motor racing competition in Oyama, Japan

Layout of Fuji Speedway, where the race was held

The 2025 GT Fuji Sprint was the fourth round of the 2025 Super GT Series. It was held at the Fuji Speedway in Oyama, Suntō District, Shizuoka on August 2–3, 2025.

There was one, 35-lap race on August 2 and two timed, 50-minute races for each class the following day. This was the first time that SUPER GT ran separate races for each class.

In the first ever Super GT sprint race, the #1 TGR Team au TOM'S Toyota GR Supra driven by Sho Tsuboi, claimed top GT500 honors, whilst Charlie Fagg won the GT300 class in the #777 D'station Racing Aston Martin Vantage AMR GT3 Evo.

In the two standalone Sunday sprints, Tomonobu Fujii completed D'station Racing’s sweep of the GT300 races, while Nirei Fukuzumi extended Toyota’s winning streak to nine after the Supras dominated the weekend.

== Race 1 (Combined) ==
=== Race results ===
Class winners denoted in bold.

Pos	No	Entrant	Driver	Chassis	Tyre	Laps	Time/Retired
GT500
1	**1**	**(Japan) TGR Team au TOM'S**	**(Japan) Sho Tsuboi**	**Toyota GR Supra GT500**	B	**35**	**57:40.012**
2	38	(Japan) TGR Team KeePer Cerumo	(Japan) Toshiki Oyu	Toyota GR Supra GT500	B	35	+2.529
3	37	(Japan) TGR Team Deloitte TOM'S	(Japan) Ukyo Sasahara	Toyota GR Supra GT500	B	35	+23.453
4	19	(Japan) TGR Team WedsSport Bandoh	(Japan) Sena Sakaguchi	Toyota GR Supra GT500	Y	35	+27.464
5	39	(Japan) TGR Team SARD	(Argentina) Sacha Fenestraz	Toyota GR Supra GT500	B	35	+27.986
6	12	(Japan) Team Impul	(Belgium) Bertrand Baguette	Nissan Z NISMO GT500	B	35	+29.209
7	100	(Japan) Stanley Team Kunimitsu	(Japan) Tadasuke Makino	Honda Civic Type R-GT	B	35	+32.722
8	3	(Japan) NISMO NDDP	(Japan) Daiki Sasaki	Nissan Z NISMO GT500	B	35	+35.875
9	17	(Japan) Astemo Real Racing	(Japan) Syun Koide	Honda Civic Type R-GT	B	35	+37.629
10	8	(Japan) ARTA	(Japan) Tomoki Nojiri	Honda Civic Type R-GT	B	35	+43.394
11	23	(Japan) NISMO	(Japan) Mitsunori Takaboshi	Nissan Z NISMO GT500	B	35	+47.489
12	24	(Japan) Kondo Racing	(Japan) Tsugio Matsuda	Nissan Z NISMO GT500	Y	35	+53.428
13	16	(Japan) ARTA	(Japan) Hiroki Otsu	Honda Civic Type R-GT	B	35	+54.885
14	64	(Japan) Modulo Nakajima Racing	(Japan) Takuya Izawa	Honda Civic Type R-GT	D	35	+55.683
DNF	14	(Japan) TGR Team ENEOS ROOKIE	(Japan) Kazuya Oshima	Toyota GR Supra GT500	B	–	Crash
GT300
1	**777**	**(Japan) D'station Racing**	**(United Kingdom) Charlie Fagg**	**Aston Martin Vantage AMR GT3 Evo**	D	**33**	**59:06.170**
2	4	(Japan) Goodsmile Racing & TeamUkyo	(Japan) Tatsuya Kataoka	Mercedes-AMG GT3 Evo	Y	33	+0.785
3	65	(Japan) K2 R&D LEON Racing	(Japan) Naoya Gamou	Mercedes-AMG GT3 Evo	B	33	+1.235
4	7	(Japan) CarGuy MKS Racing	(Japan) Rikuto Kobayashi	Ferrari 296 GT3	Y	33	+1.778
5	52	(Japan) Saitama Green Brave	(Japan) Hiroki Yoshida	Toyota GR Supra GT300	B	33	+4.828
6	2	(Japan) Hyper Water Racing Inging	(Japan) Hibiki Taira	Toyota GR86 GT300	B	33	+5.638
7	5	(Japan) Team Mach	(Japan) Yusuke Shiotsu	Toyota 86 MC GT300	Y	33	+7.998
8	61	(Japan) R&D Sport	(Japan) Hideki Yamauchi	Subaru BRZ GT300 (ZD8)	D	33	+8.876
9	666	(Japan) Seven x Seven Racing	(Japan) Tsubasa Kondo	Porsche 911 GT3 R (992)	Y	32	+1 Lap
10	18	(Japan) Team UpGarage	(Japan) Takashi Kobayashi	Mercedes-AMG GT3 Evo	Y	32	+1 Lap
11	56	(Japan) Kondo Racing	(Brazil) João Paulo de Oliveira	Nissan GT-R Nismo GT3	Y	32	+1 Lap
12	11	(Japan) GAINER	(Japan) Ryuichiro Tomita	Nissan Fairlady Z GT300 (RZ34)	D	32	+1 Lap
13	45	(Japan) Ponos Racing	(Japan) Takuro Shinohara	Ferrari 296 GT3	D	32	+1 Lap
14	26	(Japan) Anest Iwata Racing	(Brazil) Igor Omura Fraga	Lexus RC F GT3	Y	32	+1 Lap
15	6	(Japan) Velorex	(Spain) Roberto Merhi Muntan	Ferrari 296 GT3	Y	32	+1 Lap
16	20	(Japan) SHADE Racing	(Japan) Eijiro Shimizu	Toyota GR86 GT300	MI	32	+1 Lap
17	31	(Japan) apr	(Denmark) Oliver Rasmussen	Lexus LC 500h GT	B	32	+1 Lap
18	60	(Japan) LM corsa	(Japan) Shunsuke Kohno	Lexus LC 500 GT	D	32	+1 Lap
19	62	(Japan) HELM Motorsports	(Japan) Yuya Hiraki	Nissan GT-R Nismo GT3	Y	32	+1 Lap
20	360	(Japan) Tomei Sports	(Japan) Rin Arakawa	Nissan GT-R Nismo GT3	Y	32	+1 Lap
21	87	(Japan) JLOC	(Japan) Kosuke Matsuura	Lamborghini Huracán GT3 Evo 2	Y	32	+1 Lap
22	9	(Japan) Pacific Racing Team	(Japan) Ryohei Sakaguchi	Mercedes-AMG GT3 Evo	Y	32	+1 Lap
23	22	(Japan) R'Qs Motor Sports	(Japan) Masaki Kano	Mercedes-AMG GT3 Evo	Y	32	+1 Lap
24	30	(Japan) apr	(Japan) Manabu Orido	Toyota GR86 GT300	MI	32	+1 Lap
25	25	(Japan) Hoppy Team Tsuchiya	(Japan) Kimiya Sato	Toyota GR Supra GT300	Y	32	+1 Lap
26	48	(Japan) Nilzz Racing	(Japan) Taiyo Ida	Nissan GT-R Nismo GT3	Y	32	+1 Lap
DNF	0	(Japan) JLOC	(Japan) Takashi Kogure	Lamborghini Huracán GT3 Evo 2	Y	17	Mechanical
DNF	96	(Japan) K-tunes Racing	(Japan) Morio Nitta	Lexus RC F GT3	D	4	Did not finish

== Race 2 (GT300) ==
=== Race results ===
Winner denoted in bold.

Pos	No	Entrant	Driver	Chassis	Tyre	Laps	Time/Retired
1	**777**	**(Japan) D'station Racing**	**(Japan) Tomonobu Fujii**	**Aston Martin Vantage AMR GT3 Evo**	D	**31**	**50:58.204**
2	2	(Japan) Hyper Water Racing Inging	(Japan) Yuui Tsutsumi	Toyota GR86 GT300	B	31	+1.271
3	65	(Japan) K2 R&D LEON Racing	(Japan) Togo Suganami	Mercedes-AMG GT3 Evo	B	31	+3.160
4	5	(Japan) Team Mach	(Japan) Iori Kimura	Toyota 86 MC GT300	Y	31	+11.490
5	4	(Japan) Goodsmile Racing & TeamUkyo	(Japan) Nobuteru Taniguchi	Mercedes-AMG GT3 Evo	Y	31	+14.111
6	52	(Japan) Saitama Green Brave	(Japan) Seita Nonaka	Toyota GR Supra GT300	B	31	+14.880
7	18	(Japan) Team UpGarage	(Japan) Yuto Nomura	Mercedes-AMG GT3 Evo	Y	31	+15.144
8	666	(Japan) Seven x Seven Racing	(United Kingdom) Harry King	Porsche 911 GT3 R (992)	Y	31	+17.587
9	45	(Japan) Ponos Racing	(Japan) Kei Cozzolino	Ferrari 296 GT3	D	31	+22.359
10	56	(Japan) Kondo Racing	(Japan) Kohei Hirate	Nissan GT-R Nismo GT3	Y	31	+23.832
11	0	(Japan) JLOC	(Japan) Yuya Motojima	Lamborghini Huracán GT3 Evo 2	Y	31	+26.046
12	62	(Japan) HELM Motorsports	(Japan) Reiji Hiraki	Nissan GT-R Nismo GT3	Y	31	+48.190
13	9	(Japan) Pacific Racing Team	(Japan) Yusuke Tomibayashi	Mercedes-AMG GT3 Evo	Y	31	+48.906
14	87	(Japan) JLOC	(Japan) Natsu Sakaguchi	Lamborghini Huracán GT3 Evo 2	Y	31	+49.401
15	96	(Japan) K-tunes Racing	(Japan) Shinichi Takagi	Lexus RC F GT3	D	31	+50.149
16	60	(Japan) LM corsa	(Japan) Hiroki Yoshimoto	Lexus LC 500 GT	D	31	+51.947
17	7	(Japan) CarGuy MKS Racing	(United Kingdom) Zak O'Sullivan	Ferrari 296 GT3	Y	31	+57.423
18	26	(Japan) Anest Iwata Racing	(Japan) Hironobu Yasuda	Lexus RC F GT3	Y	31	+57.713
19	11	(Japan) GAINER	(Japan) Kazuki Oki	Nissan Fairlady Z GT300 (RZ34)	D	31	+59.374
20	360	(Japan) Tomei Sports	(Japan) Hironobu Shimizu	Nissan GT-R Nismo GT3	Y	31	+1:04.621
21	20	(Japan) SHADE Racing	(Japan) Katsuyuki Hiranaka	Toyota GR86 GT300	MI	31	+1:14.900
22	48	(Japan) Nilzz Racing	(Japan) Yusaku Shibata	Nissan GT-R Nismo GT3	Y	31	+1:15.295
23	25	(Japan) Hoppy Team Tsuchiya	(Japan) Takamitsu Matsui	Toyota GR Supra GT300	Y	31	+1:15.618
24	30	(Japan) apr	(Japan) Hiroaki Nagai	Toyota GR86 GT300	MI	31	+1:50.987
25	22	(Japan) R'Qs Motor Sports	(Japan) Masaki Jyonai	Mercedes-AMG GT3 Evo	Y	30	+1 Lap
DNF	61	(Japan) R&D Sport	(Japan) Takuto Iguchi	Subaru BRZ GT300 (ZD8)	D	4	Mechanical
DNF	31	(Japan) apr	(Japan) Miki Koyama	Lexus LC 500h GT	B	2	Accident
DNF	6	(Japan) Velorex	(Japan) Yoshiaki Katayama	Ferrari 296 GT3	Y	1	Accident

== Race 3 (GT500) ==
=== Race results ===
Winner denoted in bold.

Pos	No	Entrant	Driver	Chassis	Tyre	Laps	Time/Retired
1	**14**	**(Japan) TGR Team ENEOS ROOKIE**	**(Japan) Nirei Fukuzumi**	**Toyota GR Supra GT500**	B	**34**	**50:22.936**
2	1	(Japan) TGR Team au TOM'S	(Japan) Kenta Yamashita	Toyota GR Supra GT500	B	34	+0.728
3	38	(Japan) TGR Team KeePer Cerumo	(Japan) Hiroaki Ishiura	Toyota GR Supra GT500	B	34	+20.508
4	39	(Japan) TGR Team SARD	(Japan) Yuhi Sekiguchi	Toyota GR Supra GT500	B	34	+33.636
5	12	(Japan) Team Impul	(Japan) Kazuki Hiramine	Nissan Z NISMO GT500	B	34	+44.733
6	3	(Japan) NISMO NDDP	(Japan) Atsushi Miyake	Nissan Z NISMO GT500	B	34	+49.279
7	37	(Japan) TGR Team Deloitte TOM'S	(France) Giuliano Alesi	Toyota GR Supra GT500	B	34	+49.601
8	64	(Japan) Modulo Nakajima Racing	(Japan) Riki Okusa	Honda Civic Type R-GT	D	34	+50.137
9	23	(Japan) NISMO	(Japan) Katsumasa Chiyo	Nissan Z NISMO GT500	B	34	+53.614
10	24	(Japan) Kondo Racing	(Japan) Teppei Natori	Nissan Z NISMO GT500	Y	34	+53.765
11	8	(Japan) ARTA	(Japan) Nobuharu Matsushita	Honda Civic Type R-GT	B	34	+57.478
12	100	(Japan) Stanley Team Kunimitsu	(Japan) Naoki Yamamoto	Honda Civic Type R-GT	B	34	+57.800
13	17	(Japan) Astemo Real Racing	(Japan) Koudai Tsukakoshi	Honda Civic Type R-GT	B	34	+59.811
14	16	(Japan) ARTA	(Japan) Ren Sato	Honda Civic Type R-GT	B	33	+1 Lap
15	19	(Japan) TGR Team WedsSport Bandoh	(Japan) Yuji Kunimoto	Toyota GR Supra GT500	Y	33	+1 Lap

Super GT Series
Previous race: 2025 Super GT Malaysia Festival	2025 season	Next race: 2025 Suzuka GT 300km
