= Toshiki Oyu =

Japanese racing driver (born 1998)

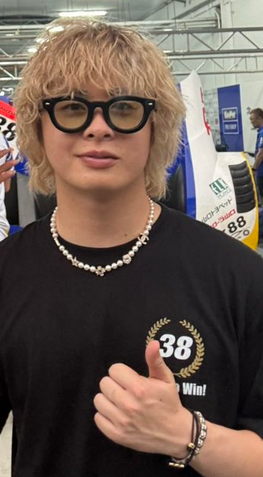
- Oyu at the 2025 Super GT Malaysia Festival
- Nationality: (Japan) Japanese
- Born: 4 August 1998 (age 28) Sapporo, Hokkaido, Japan

Super Formula career
- Debut season: 2020
- Current team: Sanki Vertex Partners Cerumo・INGING
- Car number: 39
- Former teams: TGM Grand Prix, Nakajima Racing
- Starts: 51
- Wins: 1
- Podiums: 7
- Poles: 3
- Fastest laps: 4
- Best finish: 5th in 2021

Super GT career
- Debut season: 2021
- Current team: TGR Team KeePer Cerumo
- Car number: 38
- Former teams: Team Mugen, ARTA
- Starts: 41
- Wins: 2
- Podiums: 9
- Poles: 4
- Fastest laps: 2
- Best finish: 3rd in 2025

Previous series
- 2020 2019 2018–19 2016–17: Super GT - GT300; Euroformula Open Championship; Japanese Formula 3 Championship; F4 Japanese Championship

Toshiki Oyu (大湯都史樹, Ōyu Toshiki; born 4 August 1998) is a Japanese racing driver for Toyota Gazoo Racing who currently competes in Super GT for Team Cerumo and in Super Formula for INGING. He was previously a factory driver for Honda until 2023.

== Career ==
=== Early career ===
Oyu made his motorsport debut in karting in 2007, racing in local championships on his home island of Hokkaido. He would go on to win the All-Japan Junior Kart Championship in 2010, his first year of national-level competition, and would compete in the All-Japan Karting Championship and Suzuka series between 2011 and 2015 against the likes of Ritomo Miyata, Sena Sakaguchi, and Kazuto Kotaka, finishing in third behind the former two in 2013.

Oyu made his formula racing debut in 2015 after gaining the support of fellow Sapporo native Katsuyuki Hiranaka, racing in the Super FJ Okayama Challenge Cup for Rn-sports. After moving to Suzuka to further his racing career, he moved into Formula 4, remaining with Rn-sports to contest the JAF Formula 4 Championship and F4 Japanese Championship. In an extraordinarily successful year, Oyu became champion of both the West and East divisions in JAF F4, and took two race wins at Sportsland SUGO and Suzuka to finish third in the latter championship behind Miyata and Sakaguchi. In November 2016, Oyu graduated from Honda's Suzuka Circuit Racing School, defeating Ukyō Sasahara, Yuki Tsunoda, and Teppei Natori to claim the first-place Honda Formula Dream Project scholarship. Oyu continued in the F4 Japanese Championship for the 2017 season as a Honda protégé, racing for the Honda Formula Dream Project's eponymous team, but would ultimately finish fourth behind reigning champion Miyata, Sasahara, and Tsunoda despite claiming victories at Autopolis, Fuji Speedway, and Twin Ring Motegi.

=== Formula 3 ===
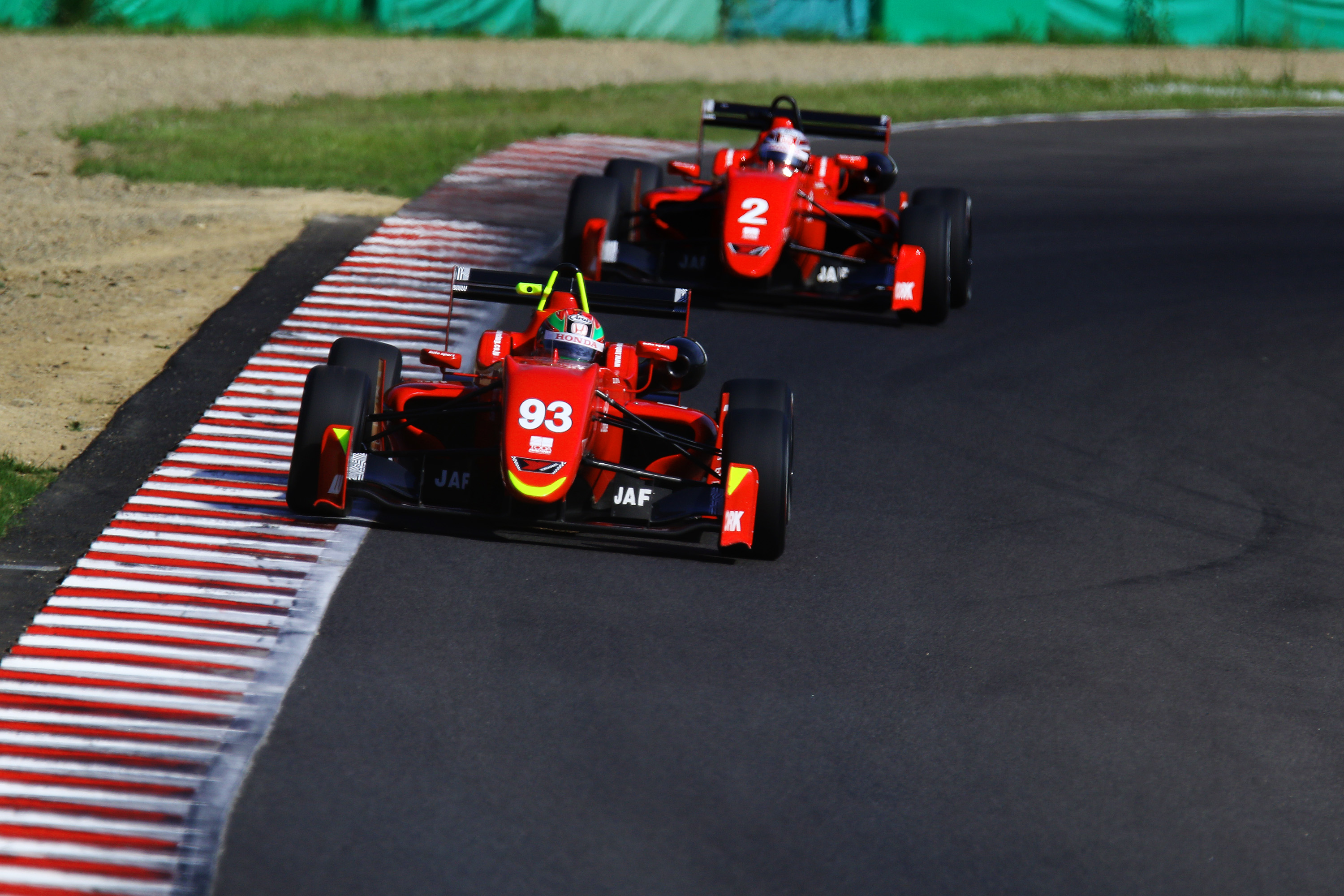
Oyu leading Sena Sakaguchi in the 2018 Japanese Formula 3 Championship at Sportsland SUGO

Oyu stepped up to Formula Three for 2018, racing in the Japanese Formula 3 Championship for Toda Racing. He took four podium finishes at SUGO, Okayama, and Motegi, and finished sixth in the overall standings with 39 points. At the end of the season, he made his debut for Toda in the Macau Grand Prix, finishing sixteenth.

Oyu remained with Toda for the 2019 season, taking his first race victory at the fourth round in Sugo and six podiums throughout the season to claim fourth in the standings behind Sacha Fenestraz, Ritomo Miyata and Enaam Ahmed. Oyu gained his first international opportunity in September 2019, standing in for compatriot Yuki Tsunoda at Team Motopark for the Silverstone round of the 2019 Euroformula Open Championship, due to Tsunoda's commitments in the FIA Formula 3 Championship. Oyu went on to stun on his European debut, taking pole position and victory in both races and shattering the track's lap record by over seven tenths. However, despite garnering praise from Motopark boss Timo Rumpfkeil and being assessed for a spot in the Red Bull Junior Team, Oyu ultimately returned to Japan and has not raced internationally since.

=== Super Formula ===
==== 2020 ====
In December 2019, amid uncertainties over his future, Oyu received a last-minute call-up from TCS Nakajima Racing to drive in the Super Formula Championship's post-season test at Suzuka. Impressive test results and the departure of incumbent Álex Palou to the IndyCar Series prompted team director and former Formula One driver Satoru Nakajima to sign Oyu for the 2020 season, partnering Formula 2 race winner and former karting rival Tadasuke Makino. Oyu impressed on debut at Twin Ring Motegi, going fastest in free practice and qualifying in fourth position - the highest of any Honda-powered driver, but suffered a puncture on the first lap and was relegated to the back of the field. He qualified well again at the next round in Okayama, taking fifth position behind Makino, but locked up his brakes into the race's first corner and crashed into Makino and Kondō Racing's Sacha Fenestraz, dashing the team's hopes of any results. His struggles continued at the third race in Sugo, where his weekend was curtailed by an early crash in qualifying, and at the fourth round in Autopolis, where he scored his first point but suffered clutch problems and a resulting drive-through penalty at the race start.

The season's fifth and sixth rounds were held in a double-header at Suzuka. Oyu qualified in seventh and second for the two races respectively, finishing the second qualifying session two tenths shy of polesitter Nick Cassidy. After finishing eighth in the first race, a sudden engine failure for Cassidy saw Oyu seize the lead. Oyu would go on to hold off Nirei Fukuzumi following a safety car restart to claim a breakthrough maiden victory. His performances continued at the final round at Fuji, where he benefited from other drivers' late-race struggles to go from sixth to second at the flag. Oyu's late-season results ultimately led to a sixth-place finish in the championship.

==== 2021 ====
Oyu remained with Nakajima Racing for the 2021 season, and was joined by reigning champion Naoki Yamamoto, who switched seats with Tadasuke Makino at docomo Team Dandelion Racing.

==== 2022 ====
Oyu remained at Nakajima Racing for the 2022 season alongside Yamamoto.

==== 2023 ====
Despite his strong results in the latter half of 2022, Oyu was dropped by Nakajima at the end of the year and was absent from the Super Formula entry list released by Honda in 2022, with his seat taken by former Red Bull junior Ren Satō, who moved over from Team Goh. In March 2023, Oyu was announced to be remaining in Super Formula, taking the place of Satō at the newly rebranded TGM Grand Prix team and partnering former Formula 2 driver Cem Bölükbaşı.

Prior to the season-ending double-header at Suzuka, Oyu announced that funding issues had curtailed his season prematurely despite his performances. He was replaced by Super GT driver and series debutant Riki Okusa.

==== 2024 and Toyota switch ====
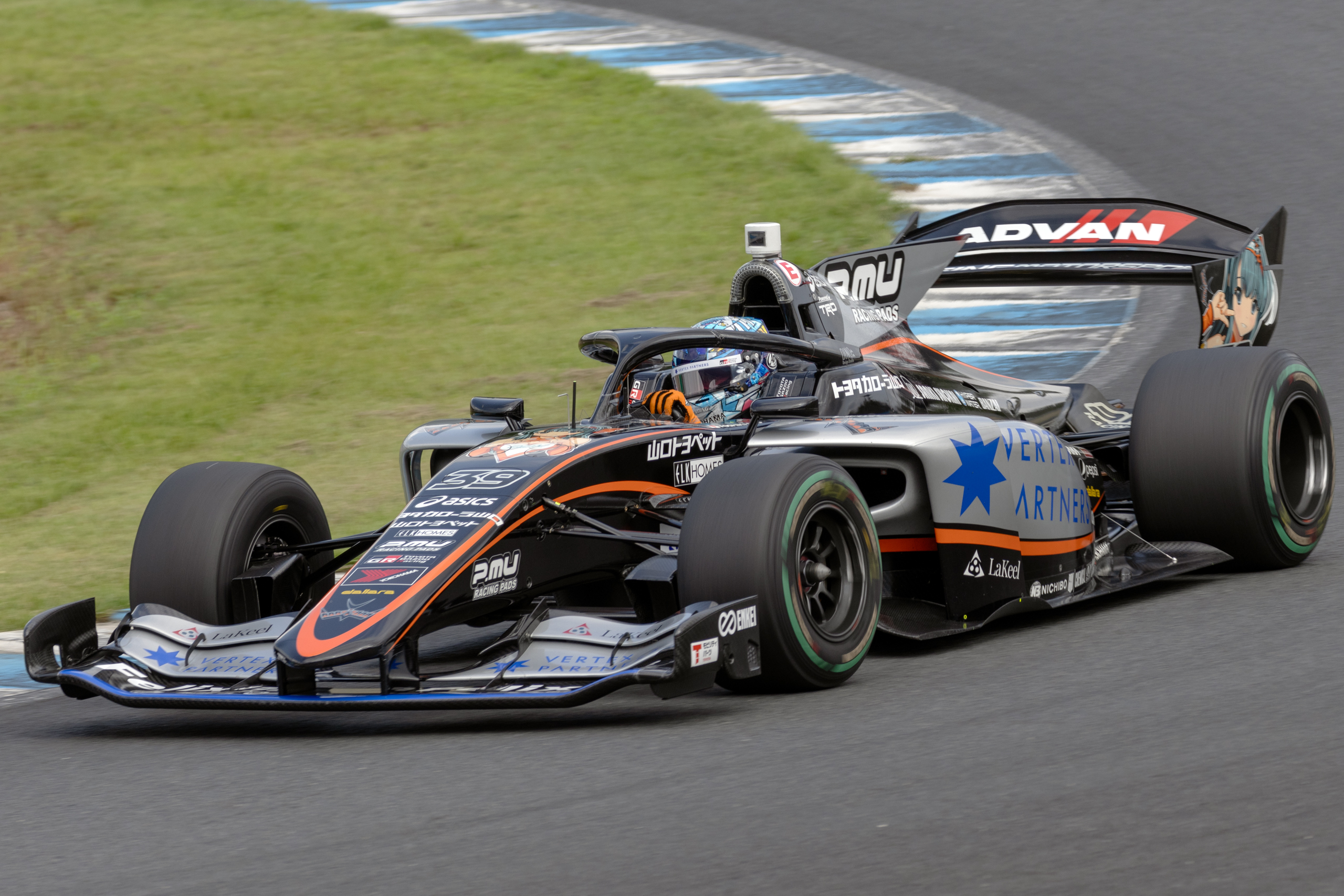
Oyu driving the Dallara SF23 at Mobility Resort Motegi

In December 2023, Oyu partook in the Super Formula post-season test at Suzuka for the Toyota-powered P.mu/Cerumo INGING team, prompting surprise from within the paddock. The following month, Oyu's departure from Honda to Toyota was confirmed with the release of Toyota's 2024 motorsport entry list, with Oyu being set to join Vertex Partners Cerumo・INGING for the 2024 season, taking the place of TOM'S-bound Shō Tsuboi alongside former rival Sena Sakaguchi.

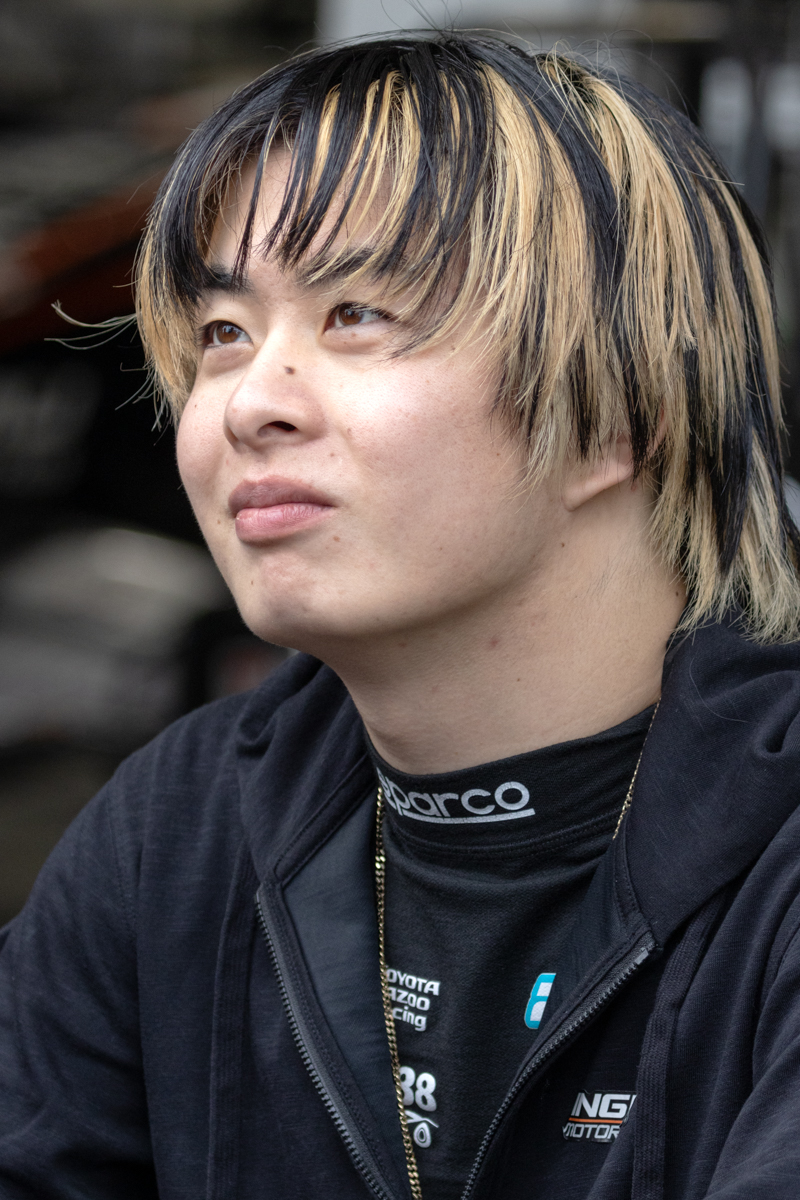
Oyu in the 2024 Super Formula Championship at Suzuka Circuit

=== Super GT ===
Oyu made his debut in Super GT in 2020, racing for ARTA in a Honda NSX GT300 alongside veteran and two-time series champion Shinichi Takagi. The team was later joined by Formula 2 graduate Nobuharu Matsushita for the final two rounds.

Oyu moved up to the top-flight GT500 class for the 2021 season, partnering Ukyō Sasahara at Red Bull Team Mugen.

Following his switch to Toyota at the end of 2023, Oyu joined Team KeePer Cerumo for the 2024 Super GT season, partnering longtime Cerumo driver Hiroaki Ishiura.

== Personal life ==
Oyu is known in Japan as an online personality and automotive YouTuber, producing videos about his racing career and his personal Honda S2000. He has made numerous appearances on the Hot-Version video series (formerly Best Motoring) alongside racing driver and longtime host Keiichi Tsuchiya, often featuring his own car. He has cited Kimi Räikkönen as his favourite racing driver.

Oyu has one younger brother. His parents own a curry-focused food processing company in Otaru which sponsored him throughout his junior career and sells a themed curry aimed at his fans.

== Racing record ==
=== Career summary ===
| Season | Series | Team | Races | Wins | Poles | FLaps | Podiums | Points | Position |
|---|---|---|---|---|---|---|---|---|---|
| 2015 | Super-FJ Okayama Challenge Cup | Rn-sports TANZEN | 4 | 3 | 1 | 2 | 4 | 75 | **1st** |
| 2015 | Super-FJ All-Japan Final | Rn-sports TANZEN | 1 | 0 | 0 | 0 | 1 | N/A | **2nd** |
| 2016 | F4 Japanese Championship | Rn-sports | 13 | 2 | 1 | 2 | 3 | 126 | **3rd** |
| 2016 | JAF Formula 4 - West | TANZEN Rn-sports | 7 | 5 | 4 | 5 | 6 | 115 | **1st** |
| 2016 | JAF Formula 4 - East | TANZEN Rn-sports | 6 | 6 | 6 | 6 | 6 | 120 | **1st** |
| 2017 | F4 Japanese Championship | Honda Formula Dream Project | 13 | 3 | 4 | 2 | 7 | 166 | 4th |
| 2018 | Japanese Formula 3 Championship | Toda Racing | 19 | 0 | 0 | 0 | 4 | 39 | 6th |
| 2018 | Macau Grand Prix | Toda Racing | 1 | 0 | 0 | 0 | 0 | N/A | 16th |
| 2019 | Japanese Formula 3 Championship | Toda Racing | 20 | 1 | 0 | 0 | 6 | 60 | 4th |
| 2019 | Euroformula Open Championship | Motopark | 2 | 2 | 2 | 0 | 2 | 52 | 13th |
| 2020 | Super Formula | TCS Nakajima Racing | 7 | 1 | 0 | 0 | 2 | 41 | 6th |
| 2020 | Super GT - GT300 | ARTA | 8 | 0 | 0 | 0 | 2 | 45 | 4th |
| 2021 | Super Formula | TCS Nakajima Racing | 7 | 0 | 0 | 2 | 2 | 41 | 5th |
| 2021 | Super GT - GT500 | Team Red Bull Mugen | 8 | 0 | 1 | 0 | 0 | 20 | 16th |
| 2022 | Super Formula | TCS Nakajima Racing | 10 | 0 | 1 | 1 | 1 | 43 | 8th |
| 2022 | Super GT - GT500 | Team Red Bull Mugen | 8 | 0 | 0 | 0 | 1 | 16.5 | 14th |
| 2023 | Super GT - GT500 | ARTA | 8 | 1 | 1 | 1 | 2 | 38 | 8th |
| 2023 | Super Formula | TGM Grand Prix | 6 | 0 | 2 | 1 | 1 | 22 | 9th |
| 2024 | Super GT - GT500 | TGR Team KeePer Cerumo | 8 | 0 | 1 | 0 | 2 | 54 | 4th |
| 2024 | Super Formula | Vertex Partners Cerumo・INGING | 9 | 0 | 0 | 0 | 1 | 27 | 9th |
| 2025 | Super GT - GT500 | TGR Team KeePer Cerumo | 8 | 1 | 2 | 1 | 3 | 56 | **3rd** |
| 2025 | Super Formula | Sanki Vertex Partners Cerumo・INGING | 12 | 0 | 0 | 0 | 0 | 21.5 | 12th |
| 2026 | Super Formula | Sanki Vertex Partners Cerumo・INGING | | | | | | | |
| 2026 | Super GT - GT500 | TGR Team KeePer Cerumo | 8 | 0 | 1 | 1 | 2 | 51 | 5th |

^{*} Season still in progress.
‡ Team standings

=== Complete F4 Japanese Championship results ===
(key) (Races in bold indicate pole position) (Races in italics indicate fastest lap)

| Year | Team | 1 | 2 | 3 | 4 | 5 | 6 | 7 | 8 | 9 | 10 | 11 | 12 | 13 | 14 | DC | Pts |
|---|---|---|---|---|---|---|---|---|---|---|---|---|---|---|---|---|---|
| 2016 | Rn-sports | OKA; 1; 8 | OKA; 2; 4 | FUJ1; 1 Ret | FUJ1; 2; 14 | SUG; 1; 1 | SUG; 2; 4 | FUJ2; 1; 6 | FUJ2; 2; 4 | FUJ2; 3; 24 | SUZ; 1; 4 | **SUZ**; **2**; **1** | **MOT**; **1**; **13** | **MOT**; **2**; **3** | MOT; 3; 10 | 3rd | 126 |
| 2017 | Honda Formula Dream Project | OKA; 1; 24 | OKA; 2; 5 | **FUJ1**; **1**; **2** | FUJ1; 2; 2 | **AUT**; **1**; **2** | **AUT**; **2**; **1** | SUG; 1 Ret | SUG; 2 Ret | FUJ2; 1 DNS | FUJ2; 2; 1 | SUZ; 1; 3 | SUZ; 2; 4 | MOT; 1 Ret | MOT; 2; 1 | 4th | 166 |

=== Complete Japanese Formula 3 Championship results ===
(key) (Races in bold indicate pole position) (Races in italics indicate fastest lap)

| Year | Team | Engine | 1 | 2 | 3 | 4 | 5 | 6 | 7 | 8 | 9 | 10 | 11 | 12 | 13 | 14 | 15 | 16 | 17 | 18 | 19 | 20 | 21 | DC | Pts |
|---|---|---|---|---|---|---|---|---|---|---|---|---|---|---|---|---|---|---|---|---|---|---|---|---|---|
| 2018 | Toda Racing | Toda Racing | SUZ; 1; 14 | SUZ; 2; 9 | SUG; 1; 3 | SUG; 2; 4 | FUJ; 1; 4 | FUJ; 2 Ret | OKA; 1; 9 | OKA; 2; 3 | OKA; 3 C | MOT; 1; 3 | MOT; 2; 6 | MOT; 3; 3 | OKA; 1 Ret | OKA; 2; 5 | OKA; 3 C | SUG; 1; 6 | SUG; 2; 4 | SUG; 3 Ret | SUG; 4 DNS | FUJ; 1; 4 | FUJ; 2; 4 | 6th | 39 |
| 2019 | Toda Racing | Toda Racing | SUZ; 1; 5 | SUZ; 2; 4 | AUT; 1; 2 | AUT; 2; 2 | AUT; 3; 2 | OKA; 1; 6 | OKA; 2; 6 | OKA; 3; 6 | SUG; 1; 5 | SUG; 2; 1 | FUJ; 1; 3 | FUJ; 2; 6 | SUG; 1; 6 | SUG; 2; 7 | SUG; 3; 6 | MOT; 1; 3 | MOT; 2; 5 | MOT; 3; 7 | OKA; 1; 5 | OKA; 2; 5 | | 4th | 60 |

=== Complete Macau Grand Prix results ===
| Year | Team | Car | Qualifying | Quali Race | Main race |
|---|---|---|---|---|---|
| 2018 | (Japan) Toda Racing | Dallara F317 | 26th | 21st | 16th |

=== Complete Super GT results ===
(key) (Races in bold indicate pole position) (Races in italics indicate fastest lap)

| Year | Team | Car | Class | 1 | 2 | 3 | 4 | 5 | 6 | 7 | 8 | 9 | DC | Pts |
|---|---|---|---|---|---|---|---|---|---|---|---|---|---|---|
| 2020 | ARTA | Honda NSX GT3 Evo | GT300 | FUJ; 7 | FUJ; 3 | SUZ; 26 | MOT; 7 | FUJ; 2 | SUZ; 7 | MOT; 8 | FUJ; 7 | | 4th | 45 |
| 2021 | Team Red Bull Mugen | Honda NSX-GT | GT500 | OKA; 11 | FUJ; 11 | SUZ; 4 | MOT; 9 | SUG; 9 | **AUT**; Ret | MOT; 5 | FUJ; 10 | | 16th | 20 |
| 2022 | Team Red Bull Mugen | Honda NSX-GT | GT500 | OKA; 12 | FUJ; 10‡ | SUZ; 13 | FUJ; 13 | SUZ; 6 | SUG; 3 | AUT; 12 | MOT; 11 | | 14th | 16.5 |
| 2023 | ARTA | Honda NSX-GT | GT500 | OKA; 3 | FUJ; 11 | SUZ; 12 | FUJ; 14 | SUZ; 14 | **SUG**; 1 | AUT; Ret | MOT; 5 | | 8th | 38 |
| 2024 | TGR Team KeePer Cerumo | Toyota GR Supra GT500 | GT500 | OKA; 4 | FUJ; 5 | SUZ; Ret | FUJ; 3 | **SUZ**; 2^{1} | SUG; 10 | AUT; 3 | MOT; 9 | | 4th | 54 |
| 2025 | TGR Team KeePer Cerumo | Toyota GR Supra GT500 | GT500 | OKA; Ret | **FUJ**; 1 | SEP; 8 | FS1; 2 | FS2 (3) | SUZ; 5 | SUG; 11 | AUT; 4 | **MOT**; 7 | 3rd | 56 |
| 2026 | TGR Team KeePer Cerumo | Toyota GR Supra GT500 | GT500 | **OKA**; 2 | FUJ; 13† | FUJ; 6 | SUZ; 5 | SUG; 10 | AUT; 2 | MOT; 11 | MOT; 4 | | 5th | 51 |

^{†} Driver did not finish, but was classified as he completed over 90% of the race distance.
^{‡} Half points awarded as less than 75% of race distance was completed.
^{(Number)} Driver did not take part in this sprint race, points are still awarded for the teammate's result.
^{*} Season still in progress.

=== Complete Super Formula results ===
(key) (Races in bold indicate pole position) (Races in italics indicate fastest lap)

| Year | Team | Engine | 1 | 2 | 3 | 4 | 5 | 6 | 7 | 8 | 9 | 10 | 11 | 12 | DC | Points |
|---|---|---|---|---|---|---|---|---|---|---|---|---|---|---|---|---|
| 2020 | TCS Nakajima Racing | Honda | MOT; 15 | OKA; 15 | SUG; 12 | AUT; 10 | SUZ; 8 | SUZ; 1^{2} | FUJ; 2 | | | | | | 6th | 41 |
| 2021 | TCS Nakajima Racing | Honda | FUJ; 2^{2} | SUZ; 10^{3} | AUT; 7 | SUG; 2 | MOT; 6 | MOT; 14 | SUZ; 11^{2} | | | | | | 5th | 41 |
| 2022 | TCS Nakajima Racing | Honda | FUJ; 7 | FUJ; 11 | SUZ; 13 | AUT; Ret | SUG; 2 | FUJ; 10 | MOT; Ret^{3} | **MOT**; 5^{1} | SUZ; 4^{3} | SUZ; 7 | | | 8th | 43 |
| 2023 | TGM Grand Prix | Honda | FUJ; 7 | FUJ; 20^{3} | **SUZ**; Ret^{1} | AUT; Ret | **SUG**; Ret^{1} | FUJ | MOT; 3 | SUZ | SUZ | | | | 9th | 22 |
| 2024 | Vertex Partners Cerumo・INGING | Toyota | SUZ; 16 | AUT; 15 | SUG; 5 | FUJ; 2^{3} | MOT; 6^{3} | FUJ; Ret | FUJ; 10 | SUZ; 10 | SUZ; 16 | | | | 9th | 27 |
| 2025 | Sanki Vertex Partners Cerumo・INGING | Toyota | SUZ; Ret | SUZ; 7 | MOT; Ret | MOT; 7 | AUT; 10 | FUJ; 8 | FUJ; 7 | SUG; 12 | FUJ; 6‡ | SUZ; 12 | SUZ; 8 | SUZ; Ret | 12th | 21.5 |
| 2026 | Sanki Vertex Partners Cerumo・INGING | Toyota | MOT | MOT | AUT | SUZ | SUZ | FUJ | FUJ | SUG | FUJ | FUJ | SUZ | SUZ | | |

^{‡} Half points awarded as less than 75% of race distance was completed.
* Season still in progress.

Sporting positions
| Preceded by Álex Palou | Super Formula; Rookie Champion; 2020 | Succeeded by Hiroki Otsu |
