= Honda Formula Dream Project =

Program to support young racing drivers through their careers

- Founded: 2006
- Base: Suzuka, Japan
- Team principal(s): Takuma Sato
- Current drivers: (Japan) Taito Kato (Japan) Syo Momose (Japan) Rintaro Sato (Japan) Kotaro Shimbara (Japan) Kota Tsuchihashi

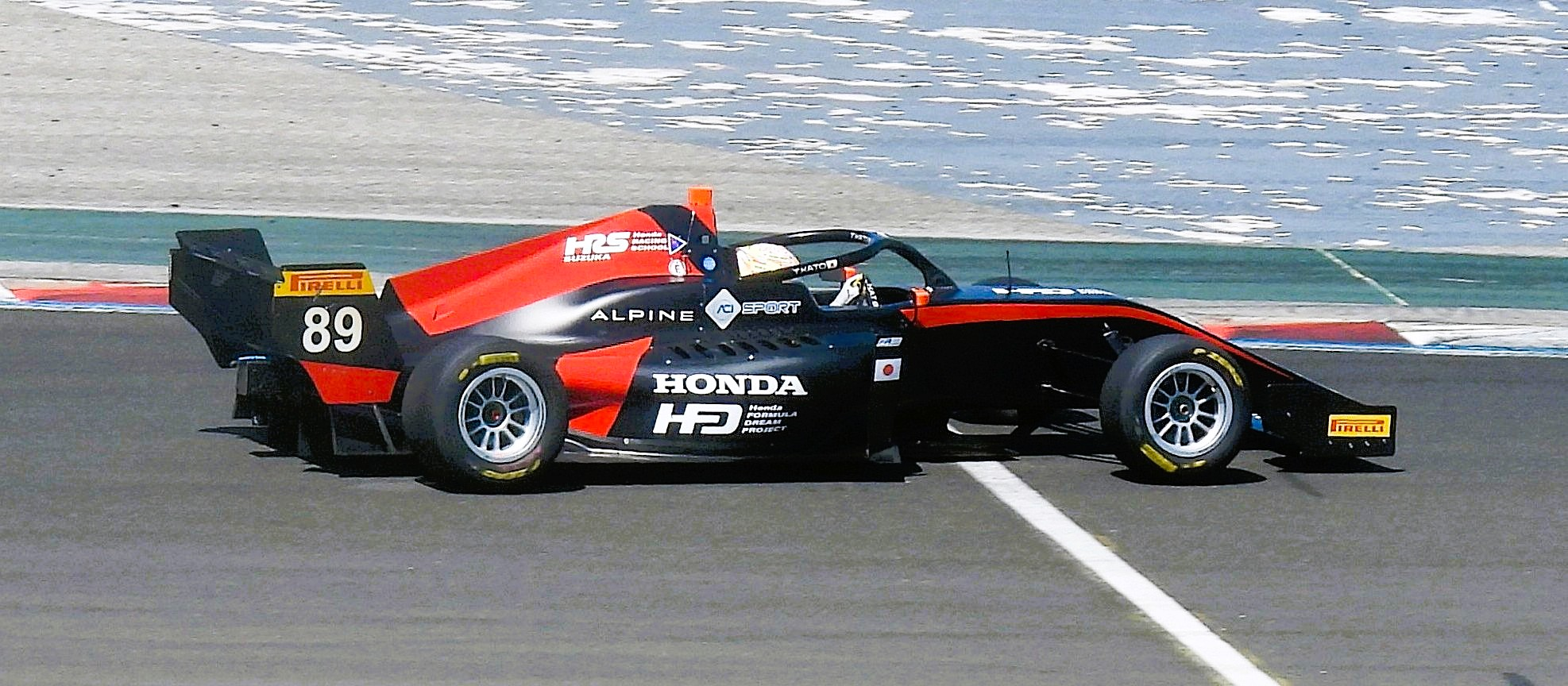
Taito Kato driving for ART Grand Prix during the 2025 Formula Regional European Championship by Alpine season.

The Honda Formula Dream Project (HFDP) is a driver development programme by Honda Racing. It is meant to promote talent in different racing series by helping them with funds, hoping to find drivers who will race for the team in the future. Notable graduates of the scheme are Yuki Tsunoda, who made his F1 debut for Scuderia Alpha Tauri.

== Current drivers ==
Driver	Years	Current Series	Titles as HFDP driver
(Japan) Taito Kato	2024–	Formula Regional Middle East Trophy; FIA Formula 3 Championship	**French F4 Championship (2024)**
(Japan) Syo Momose	2025–	F4 Japanese Championship	None
(Japan) Kotaro Shimbara	2025–	Super Formula Lights; Super GT - GT300	None
(Japan) Kazuma Kurosawa	2026–	F4 Japanese Championship	None
(Japan) Kota Tsuchihashi	2026–	French F4 Championship	None

- Championship titles highlighted in **bold**.

== Former drivers ==
Driver	Years	Series competed
(Japan) Takuya Izawa	2006–2007	Japanese Formula 3 Championship (2006–2007)
(Japan) Koudai Tsukakoshi	2006–2010	Japanese Formula 3 Championship (2006–2007); Formula 3 Euro Series (2008); Formula Nippon Championship (2008–2010); Super GT – GT500 (2008–2010)
(Japan) Yuhki Nakayama	2007–2008	Japanese Formula 3 Championship (2007–2008)
(Japan) Naoki Yamamoto	2007–2009	Formula Challenge Japan (2007); Japanese Formula 3 Championship (2009–2010)
(Japan) Kazuma Kokubu	2008	Formula Challenge Japan (2008)
(Japan) Ryoji Motojima	2008	Formula Challenge Japan (2008)
(Japan) Takashi Kobayashi	2008–2010	Formula Challenge Japan (2008); Japanese Formula 3 Championship (2009–2010)
(Japan) Kazuki Miura	2008–2011	Formula Challenge Japan (2008–2009); Japanese Formula 3 Championship (2010–2011)
(Japan) Tomoki Nojiri	2009–2013	Formula Challenge Japan (2009–2010); Japanese Formula 3 Championship (2011–2013)
(Japan) Shinji Nakamura	2010	Formula Challenge Japan (2010)
(Japan) Kazuki Hiramine	2010–2012	Formula Challenge Japan (2010–2011); Japanese Formula 3 Championship (2012)
(Japan) Shota Kiyohara	2011, 2013–2014	Formula Challenge Japan (2011); Japanese Formula 3 Championship (2013–2014)
(Japan) Yuya Motojima	2011	Formula Challenge Japan (2011)
(Japan) Shinnosuke Yamada	2011	Formula Challenge Japan (2011)
(Japan) Nobuharu Matsushita (Note: Matsushita was simultaneously a member of the McLaren Driver Development Programme for 2016.)	2013–2017, 2019	**Japanese Formula 3 Championship** (2013–**2014**); GP2 Series (2015–2016); FIA Formula 2 Championship (2017, 2019); Euroformula Open Championship (2019)
(Japan) Tsubasa Takahashi	2014–2015	Japanese Formula 3 Championship (2014–2015)
(Japan) Nirei Fukuzumi (Note: Fukuzumi was simultaneously a member of the McLaren Driver Development Programme and Red Bull Junior Team.)	2014–2018	**JAF Formula 4** (**2014**); Japanese Formula 3 Championship (2015); GP3 Series (2016–2017); FIA Formula 2 Championship (2018); Super Formula Championship (2018)
(Japan) Keishi Ishikawa	2015	Japanese Formula 3 Championship (2015)
(Japan) Katsuhide Kaneishi	2015	F4 Japanese Championship (2015)
(Japan) Mizuki Ishizaka	2015–2016	F4 Japanese Championship (2015–2016)
(Japan) Yuta Kamimura	2015–2016	F4 Japanese Championship (2015–2016)
(Japan) Hiroki Otsu	2015–2017	F4 Japanese Championship (2015); Japanese Formula 3 Championship (2016–2017)
(Japan) Takuya Otaki	2016–2017	F4 Japanese Championship (2016–2017)
(Japan) Tadasuke Makino	2016–2018	Japanese Formula 3 Championship (2016); FIA Formula 3 European Championship (2016); FIA Formula 2 Championship (2018)
(Japan) Sena Sakaguchi	2016–2018	F4 Japanese Championship (2016); Japanese Formula 3 Championship (2016–2018)
(Japan) Toshiki Oyu	2016–2019	F4 Japanese Championship (2016–2017); Japanese Formula 3 Championship (2018–2019); Euroformula Open Championship (2019)
(Japan) Ukyo Sasahara	2017–2018	F4 Japanese Championship (2017); Japanese Formula 3 Championship (2018)
(Japan) Yuki Tsunoda (Note: Tsunoda was simultaneously a member of the Red Bull Junior Team from 2019 to 2020.)	2017–2020	**F4 Japanese Championship** (2017–**2018**); FIA Formula 3 Championship (2019); Euroformula Open Championship (2019); Toyota Racing Series (2020); FIA Formula 2 Championship (2020)
(Japan) Teppei Natori	2018–2020	F4 Japanese Championship (2018); FIA Formula 3 Championship (2019); Euroformula Open Championship (2019); Super Formula Lights (2020)
(Japan) Ren Sato (Note: Sato was simultaneously a member of the Red Bull Junior Team for 2022)	2018–2022	**F4 Japanese Championship** (2018–**2019**); French F4 Championship (2019–2020); Super Formula Lights (2021); Super GT - GT300 (2021); Super Formula Championship (2022)
(Japan) Miki Koyama	2019	F4 Japanese Championship (2019)
(Japan) Atsushi Miyake	2019	F4 Japanese Championship (2019)
(Japan) Kakunoshin Ohta	2019, 2021–2022	**F4 Japanese Championship** (2019, 2021); French F4 Championship (2019); Super Formula Lights (2022); Super GT - GT300 (2022)
(Japan) Ayumu Iwasa (Note: Iwasa was simultaneously a member of the Red Bull Junior Team.)	2020–2023	**French F4 Championship** (**2020**); F3 Asian Championship (2021); FIA Formula 3 Championship (2021); FIA Formula 2 Championship (2022–2023)
(Japan) Syun Koide	2021–2024	**F4 Japanese Championship** (2020–**2023**); **Super Formula Lights** (2023–**2024**); Super GT - GT300 (2023–2024)
(Japan) Kazuma Nishimura	2022	F4 Japanese Championship (2022)
(Japan) Souta Arao (Note: Arao was simultaneously a member of the Red Bull Junior Team from 2022 to 2023.)	2022–2024	French F4 Championship (2022); GB3 Championship (2023); Super Formula Lights (2024)
(Japan) Yuto Nomura	2022–2025	French F4 Championship (2022); **F4 Japanese Championship** (2023–**2024**); **Super Formula Lights** (**2025)**; Super GT - GT300 (2025)
(Japan) Iori Kimura	2021–2023	F4 Japanese Championship (2021); **Super Formula Lights** (2022–**2023**); Super GT - GT300 (2022)
(Japan) Yusuke Mitsui	2022–2023	F4 Japanese Championship (2022–2023)
(Japan) Tosei Moriyama	2023	F4 Japanese Championship (2023)
(Japan) Ryota Horachi	2024	F4 Japanese Championship (2024)
(Japan) Rintaro Sato	2025	French F4 Championship (2025)

- Championship titles highlighted in **bold**.

== See also ==
- TGR Driver Challenge Program
