= 2025 Super GT Malaysia Festival =

Layout of Sepang International Circuit, where the race was held

The 2025 Super GT Malaysia Festival was the third round of the 2025 Super GT Series. It was held at the Sepang International Circuit in Sepang, Selangor, Malaysia on June 28, 2025.

The GT500 category was won by Giuliano Alesi and Ukyo Sasahara in the #37 TGR Team Deloitte TOM'S Toyota GR Supra, whilst Takashi Kobayashi and Yuto Nomura won the GT300 category in the #18 Team UpGarage Mercedes-AMG GT3 Evo.

== Race ==
=== Race results ===
Pos	Class	No	Entrant	Drivers	Chassis	Tyre	Laps	Time/Retired
1	GT500	37	(Japan) TGR Team Deloitte TOM'S	(France) Giuliano Alesi (Japan) Ukyo Sasahara	Toyota GR Supra GT500	B	55	1:48:01.698
2	GT500	8	(Japan) ARTA	(Japan) Nobuharu Matsushita (Japan) Tomoki Nojiri	Honda Civic Type R-GT	B	55	+19.046
3	GT500	12	(Japan) Team Impul	(Belgium) Bertrand Baguette (Japan) Kazuki Hiramine	Nissan Z NISMO GT500	B	55	+23.582
4	GT500	17	(Japan) Astemo Real Racing	(Japan) Syun Koide (Japan) Koudai Tsukakoshi	Honda Civic Type R-GT	B	55	+25.107
5	GT500	19	(Japan) TGR Team WedsSport Bandoh	(Japan) Yuji Kunimoto (Japan) Sena Sakaguchi	Toyota GR Supra GT500	Y	55	+31.207
6	GT500	100	(Japan) Stanley Team Kunimitsu	(Japan) Tadasuke Makino (Japan) Naoki Yamamoto	Honda Civic Type R-GT	B	55	+31.410
7	GT500	1	(Japan) TGR Team au TOM'S	(Japan) Sho Tsuboi (Japan) Kenta Yamashita	Toyota GR Supra GT500	B	55	+32.239
8	GT500	38	(Japan) TGR Team KeePer Cerumo	(Japan) Hiroaki Ishiura (Japan) Toshiki Oyu	Toyota GR Supra GT500	B	55	+39.206
9	GT500	14	(Japan) TGR Team ENEOS ROOKIE	(Japan) Kazuya Oshima (Japan) Nirei Fukuzumi	Toyota GR Supra GT500	B	55	+39.233
10	GT500	64	(Japan) Modulo Nakajima Racing	(Japan) Takuya Izawa (Japan) Riki Okusa	Honda Civic Type R-GT	D	55	+41.716
11	GT500	3	(Japan) NISMO NDDP	(Japan) Atsushi Miyake (Japan) Daiki Sasaki	Nissan Z NISMO GT500	B	55	+52.115
12	GT500	16	(Japan) ARTA	(Japan) Hiroki Otsu (Japan) Ren Sato	Honda Civic Type R-GT	B	55	+52.403
13	GT500	23	(Japan) NISMO	(Japan) Katsumasa Chiyo (Japan) Mitsunori Takaboshi	Nissan Z NISMO GT500	B	55	+55.938
14	GT500	39	(Japan) TGR Team SARD	(Japan) Yuhi Sekiguchi (Argentina) Sacha Fenestraz	Toyota GR Supra GT500	B	55	+1:22.722
15	GT300	18	(Japan) Team UpGarage	(Japan) Takashi Kobayashi (Japan) Yuto Nomura	Mercedes-AMG GT3 Evo	Y	51	+4 laps
16	GT300	52	(Japan) Saitama Green Brave	(Japan) Hiroki Yoshida (Japan) Seita Nonaka	Toyota GR Supra GT300	B	51	+4 laps
17	GT300	4	(Japan) Goodsmile Racing & TeamUkyo	(Japan) Yuhki Nakayama (Japan) Shunji Okumoto	Mercedes-AMG GT3 Evo	Y	51	+4 laps
18	GT300	0	(Japan) JLOC	(Japan) Takashi Kogure (Japan) Yuya Motojima	Lamborghini Huracán GT3 Evo 2	Y	51	+4 laps
19	GT300	2	(Japan) Hyper Water Racing Inging	(Japan) Yuui Tsutsumi (Japan) Hibiki Taira	Toyota GR86 GT300	B	51	+4 laps
20	GT300	777	(Japan) D'station Racing	(Japan) Tomonobu Fujii (United Kingdom) Charlie Fagg	Aston Martin Vantage AMR GT3 Evo	D	51	+4 laps
21	GT300	65	(Japan) K2 R&D LEON Racing	(Japan) Naoya Gamou (Japan) Togo Suganami	Mercedes-AMG GT3 Evo	B	51	+4 laps
22	GT300	61	(Japan) R&D Sport	(Japan) Takuto Iguchi (Japan) Hideki Yamauchi	Subaru BRZ GT300 (ZD8)	D	51	+4 laps
23	GT300	56	(Japan) Kondo Racing	(Japan) Kohei Hirate (Japan) Yu Kanamaru	Nissan GT-R Nismo GT3	Y	51	+4 laps
24	GT300	87	(Japan) JLOC	(Japan) Kosuke Matsuura (Japan) Natsu Sakaguchi	Lamborghini Huracán GT3 Evo 2	Y	51	+4 laps
25	GT300	62	(Japan) HELM Motorsports	(Japan) Yuya Hiraki (Japan) Reiji Hiraki	Nissan GT-R Nismo GT3	Y	50	+5 laps
26	GT300	31	(Japan) apr	(Japan) Miki Koyama (Denmark) Oliver Rasmussen	Lexus LC 500h GT	B	50	+5 laps
27	GT300	6	(Japan) Velorex	(Japan) Yoshiaki Katayama (Spain) Roberto Merhi	Ferrari 296 GT3	Y	50	+5 laps
28	GT300	45	(Japan) Ponos Racing	(Japan) Kei Cozzolino (Japan) Takuro Shinohara	Ferrari 296 GT3	D	50	+5 laps
29	GT300	60	(Japan) LM corsa	(Japan) Hiroki Yoshimoto (Japan) Shunsuke Kohno	Lexus LC 500 GT	D	50	+5 laps
30	GT300	96	(Japan) K-tunes Racing	(Japan) Morio Nitta (Japan) Shinichi Takagi	Lexus RC F GT3	D	50	+5 laps
31	GT300	611	(New Zealand) EBM Giga Racing	(France) Dorian Boccolacci (Malaysia) Adrian D'Silva	Porsche 911 GT3 R (992)	MI	50	+5 laps
32	GT300	360	(Japan) Tomei Sports	(Japan) Takayuki Aoki (Japan) Rin Arakawa	Nissan GT-R Nismo GT3	Y	49	+6 laps
33	GT300	333	(New Zealand) EBM Giga Racing	(Malaysia) Jazeman Jaafar (China) Kerong Li	Aston Martin Vantage AMR GT3 Evo	D	49	+6 laps
DNS	GT500	24	(Japan) Kondo Racing	(Japan) Tsugio Matsuda (Japan) Teppei Natori	Nissan Z NISMO GT500	Y	0	Did not start

Super GT Series
Previous race: 2025 Fuji GT 3 Hours	2025 season	Next race: 2025 Fuji GT Sprint
