= 2018 F4 Japanese Championship =

Motor racing competition

The 2018 F4 Japanese Championship season was the fourth season of the F4 Japanese Championship. It began on 7 April in Okayama and finished on 11 November on Twin Ring Motegi after seven double header rounds.

== Teams and drivers ==
All teams and drivers were Japanese-registered

Team	No.	Driver	Class	Rounds
TOM'S Spirit	1	Kazuto Kotaka		2–7
TOM'S Spirit	36	Sota Ogawa		All
Team Right Way	2	Keiji Nakao	I	All
Yuichi Sasaki	4	Yuichi Sasaki	I	2, 4–5, 7
Honda Formula Dream Project	5	Yuki Tsunoda		All
Honda Formula Dream Project	6	Teppei Natori		All
Honda Formula Dream Project	7	Takuya Otaki		All
Honda Formula Dream Project	8	Ren Sato		All
Rn-sports	10	Ayumu Iwasa		3
Rn-sports	10	Toshihito Funai	I	7
Rn-sports	11	Masayuki Ueda	I	All
M2 Engineering	12	"Ryo"	I	3
B-MAX Engineering	13	"Syuji"	I	2–3
B-MAX Engineering	13	Motoyoshi Yoshida	I	4
B-MAX Engineering	13	"Dragon"	I	7
B-MAX Engineering	27	"Syuji"	I	4, 7
Media Do Kageyama Racing	15	Hiromichi Hayase		1–5, 7
Media Do Kageyama Racing	15	Yuui Tsutsumi		6
Media Do Kageyama Racing	16	Shinji Sawada		All
Ateam Buzz Motorsport	17	Yusuke Shiotsu		All
Ateam Buzz Motorsport	18	Daichi Okamoto		1, 3
Ateam Buzz Motorsport	18	Hideki Hirota	I	4, 6–7
Corse Ceramiche Racing	20	Hiroyuki Honda	I	2
N-Speed	23	"Yugo"	I	All
Field Motorsports	25	Kiryu Hosoda		All
Field Motorsports	55	Rikiya Kanazawa		All
Field Motorsports	95	Miki Koyama		All
Eagle Sports	28	Makio Saito	I	1–3
Eagle Sports	28	Yasushi Ide	I	4
Eagle Sports	28	Atsushi Miyake		7
Eagle Sports	29	Yasushi Ide	I	1–3
MYST	31	Kakunoshin Ohta		4
Inging Motorsport	38	Reiji Hiraki		All
Saccess Racing	39	Yuki Urata		1, 3–4
Saccess Racing	39	Miku Ikejima	I	2
Saccess Racing	39	Daichi Okamoto		7
Succeed Sports	88	Sena Kuronuma		All
Bionic Jack Racing	44	Sho Onodera		2–5
Bionic Jack Racing	44	"Ikari"	I	7
Bionic Jack Racing	98	Mizuki Ishizaka		All
Le Beausset Motorsports	62	Shota Ogura		All
Le Beausset Motorsports	63	Kohta Kawaai		All
leprix sport with SSR	70	Ryohei Tanaka		1–2
leprix sport with SSR	70	Norio Kubo	I	3
C.S.I.-Reon Kids Racing	73	Shunsuke Hanawa		1–5, 7
Skill Speed	77	Takuya Okada		1–3
Skill Speed	77	Takeshi Ohi		4–7
OTG Motor Sports	80	Yuko Tamaki		All
OTG Motor Sports	81	Togo Suganami		All
OTG Motor Sports	82	Yuma Shoji		All
NRS	83	Kazuki Hirokawa		4
Zap Speed Racing Team	86	Hachiro Osaka	I	All

Icon	Class
I	Independent Cup

== Race calendar and results ==
All rounds were held in Japan and were part of the Super GT events.

Round		Circuit	Date	Pole position	Fastest lap	Winning driver	Winning team	Independent Cup winner
1	R1	Okayama International Circuit, Mimasaka	7 April	Yuki Tsunoda	Kohta Kawaai	Teppei Natori	Honda Formula Dream Project	Keizi Nakao
1	R2	Okayama International Circuit, Mimasaka	8 April	Yuki Tsunoda	Yuki Tsunoda	Yuki Tsunoda	Honda Formula Dream Project	Masayuki Ueda
2	R1	Fuji Speedway, Oyama	3 May	Yuki Tsunoda	Ren Sato	Yuki Tsunoda	Honda Formula Dream Project	Miku Ikejima
2	R2	Fuji Speedway, Oyama	4 May	Yuki Tsunoda	Togo Suganami	Yuki Tsunoda	Honda Formula Dream Project	Miku Ikejima
3	R1	Suzuka Circuit, Suzuka	19 May	Yuki Tsunoda	Kazuto Kotaka	Yuki Tsunoda	Honda Formula Dream Project	Keizi Nakao
3	R2	Suzuka Circuit, Suzuka	20 May	Yuki Tsunoda	Teppei Natori	Yuki Tsunoda	Honda Formula Dream Project	Norio Kubo
4	R1	Fuji Speedway, Oyama	4 August	Teppei Natori	Yuki Tsunoda	Kazuto Kotaka	TOM'S Spirit	Yasushi Ide
4	R2	Fuji Speedway, Oyama	5 August	Teppei Natori	Kazuto Kotaka	Kazuto Kotaka	TOM'S Spirit	Masayuki Ueda
5	R1	Sportsland SUGO, Murata	15 September	Yuki Tsunoda	Ren Sato	Teppei Natori	Honda Formula Dream Project	Yuichi Sasaki
5	R2	Sportsland SUGO, Murata	16 September	Yuki Tsunoda	Yuki Tsunoda	Yuki Tsunoda	Honda Formula Dream Project	Keizi Nakao
6	R1	Autopolis, Hita	20 October	Togo Suganami	Togo Suganami	Togo Suganami	OTG Motor Sports	Keizi Nakao
6	R2	Autopolis, Hita	21 October	Togo Suganami	Togo Suganami	Togo Suganami	OTG Motor Sports	Keizi Nakao
7	R1	Twin Ring Motegi, Motegi	10 November	Teppei Natori	Yuki Tsunoda	Yuki Tsunoda	Honda Formula Dream Project	Keizi Nakao
7	R2	Twin Ring Motegi, Motegi	11 November	Teppei Natori	Kazuto Kotaka	Teppei Natori	Honda Formula Dream Project	Hideki Hirota

== Championship standings ==
Points are awarded as follows:

Position	**1st**	**2nd**	**3rd**	**4th**	**5th**	**6th**	**7th**	**8th**	**9th**	**10th**
Points	25	18	15	12	10	8	6	4	2	1

=== Drivers' standings ===
Pos	Driver	OKA		FUJ1		SUZ		FUJ2		SUG		AUT		MOT		Points
1	Yuki Tsunoda	**Ret**	**1**	**1**	**1**	**1**	**1**	2	3	**3**	**1**	8	11	1	2	245
2	Teppei Natori	1	4	2	17	3	4	**3**	**2**	1	2	3	3	**2**	**1**	231
3	Kazuto Kotaka			3	2	2	2	1	1	5	6	2	2	21	3	188
4	Kohta Kawaai	8	8	4	4	5	7	5	7	2	3	4	6	5	6	135
5	Togo Suganami	10	10	Ret	3	8	Ret	6	4	9	9	**1**	**1**	4	4	119
6	Shinji Sawada	3	3	Ret	Ret	12	8	7	26	16	4	6	10	10	9	64
7	Ren Sato	15	9	6	Ret	4	5	10	6	10	8	14	13	7	7	58
8	Takuya Otaki	19	DNS	20	20	16	3	8	11	6	14	5	4	6	Ret	57
9	Sota Ogawa	5	6	11	21	9	9	4	5	8	10	9	12	8	24	55
10	Mizuki Ishizaka	11	11	10	Ret	7	6	30	33	7	7	Ret	5	9	5	49
11	Shota Ogura	13	14	9	7	33	10	11	10	4	5	10	15	3	DNS	48
12	Rikiya Kanazawa	4	5	8	6	11	16	31	13	13	Ret	7	7	16	25	46
13	Reiji Hiraki	7	7	5	5	Ret	12	28	8	12	11	12	9	Ret	Ret	38
14	Kiryu Hosoda	2	2	Ret	Ret	18	11	13	14	11	12	13	17	13	14	36
15	Miki Koyama	16	12	7	14	14	13	9	9	15	17	11	16	12	Ret	10
16	Yuki Urata	6	Ret			10	14	16	12							9
17	Ayumu Iwasa					6	Ret									8
18	Yuko Tamaki	20	18	Ret	11	25	31	12	19	20	13	Ret	8	Ret	8	8
19	Takuya Okada	12	13	12	8	21	17									4
20	Sena Kuronuma	17	17	13	9	15	19	15	20	Ret	15	18	26	18	13	2
21	Daichi Okamoto	9	15			20	Ret							14	20	2
22	Sho Onodera			14	10	19	18	DNQ	DNQ							1
23	Takeshi Ohi							29	15	17	16	19	18	15	10	1
24	Atsushi Miyake													11	11	0
25	Yusuke Shiotsu	14	16	Ret	Ret	13	15	18	18	14	21	17	19	Ret	12	0
26	Yuma Shoji	18	19	16	12	17	20	14	16	22	Ret	16	20	WD	WD	0
27	Miku Ikejima			15	13											0
28	Yuui Tsutsumi											15	14			0
29	Hiromichi Hayase	23	Ret	17	15	24	23	17	23	21	23			20	15	0
30	Shunsuke Hanawa	24	22	19	19	22	22	19	30	18	22			17	16	0
31	Masayuki Ueda	22	21	18	16	Ret	25	26	21	Ret	19	21	22	22	23	0
32	Hideki Hirota							Ret	27			22	23	23	17	0
33	Kazuki Hirokawa							Ret	17							0
34	Keizi Nakao	21	Ret	25	18	28	21	Ret	22	Ret	18	20	21	19	Ret	0
35	Hachiro Osaka	28	24	22	Ret	27	24	22	28	23	24	23	24	26	18	0
36	Yuichi Sasaki			24	22			24	24	19	20					0
37	Toshihito Funai													25	19	0
38	Yasushi Ide	26	26	27	25	26	27	20	25							0
39	Ryohei Tanaka	25	20	DNQ	DNQ											0
40	"Syuji"			26	23	32	30	21	29					Ret	21	0
41	Makio Saito	27	23	21	24	31	29									0
42	"Yugo"	29	25	23	26	29	28	25	31	Ret	25	24	25	27	22	0
43	Motoyoshi Yoshida							23	32							0
44	Norio Kubo					23	Ret									0
45	"Ikari"													24	Ret	0
46	"Ryo"					30	26									0
47	Kakunoshin Ohta							27	Ret							0
—	"Dragon"													Ret	Ret	0
—	Hiroyuki Honda			DNQ	DNQ											0
Pos	Driver	OKA		FUJ1		SUZ		FUJ2		SUG		AUT		MOT		Points

Colour	Result
Gold	Winner
Silver	Second place
Bronze	Third place
Green	Points classification
Blue	Non-points classification
Blue	Non-classified finish (NC)
Purple	Retired, not classified (Ret)
Red	Did not qualify (DNQ)
Red	Did not pre-qualify (DNPQ)
Black	Disqualified (DSQ)
White	Did not start (DNS)
White	Withdrew (WD)
White	Race cancelled (C)
Blank	Did not practice (DNP)
Blank	Did not arrive (DNA)
Blank	Excluded (EX)

**Bold** – Pole
Italics – Fastest Lap
† — Did not finish, but classified

=== Teams' standings ===
Pos	Team	Pts.
1	Honda Formula Dream Project	316
2	TOM'S Spirit	210
3	Le Beausset Motorsports	140
4	OTG Motor Sports	119
5	Field Motorsports	69
6	Media Do Kageyama Racing	64
7	Bionic Jack Racing	50
8	Inging Motorsports	38
9	Saccess Racing	9
10	Rn-sports	8
11	Skill Speed	5
12	Ateam Buzz Motorsport	2
13	Succeed Sports	2

=== Independent Cup Standings ===
Pos	Driver	OKA		FUJ1		SUZ		FUJ2		SUG		AUT		MOT		Points
1	Masayuki Ueda	22	21	18	16	Ret	25	26	21	Ret	19	21	22	22	23	207
2	Keizi Nakao	21	Ret	25	18	28	21	Ret	22	Ret	18	20	21	19	Ret	201
3	Hachiro Osaka	28	24	22	Ret	27	24	22	28	23	24	23	24	26	18	177
4	"Yugo"	29	25	23	26	29	28	25	31	Ret	25	24	25	27	22	116
5	Yasushi Ide	26	26	27	25	26	27	20	25							98
6	Yuichi Sasaki			24	22			24	24	19	20					85
7	Hideki Hirota							Ret	27			22	23	23	17	80
8	Makio Saito	27	23	21	24	31	29									65
9	"Syuji"			26	23	32	30	21	29					Ret	21	61
10	Miku Ikejima			15	13											50
11	Norio Kubo					23	Ret									25
12	"Ryo"					30	26									20
13	Motoyoshi Yoshida							23	32							14
