= 2017 F4 Japanese Championship =

The 2017 F4 Japanese Championship was the third season of the F4 Japanese Championship. It began on 7 April in Okayama and finished on 12 November on Twin Ring Motegi after seven double header rounds. Ritomo Miyata defended his drivers' title successfully, continuing with TOM'S Spirit.

== Teams and drivers ==
The teams were announced on 11 March 2017.

Team	No.	Driver	Rounds
(Japan) TOM'S Spirit	1	(Japan) Ritomo Miyata	All
(Japan) TOM'S Spirit	36	(Japan) Sota Ogawa	7
(Japan) Team Right Way	2	(Japan) Keiji Nakao	1–2, 4–7
(Japan) Sutekina Racing Team	3	(Japan) Mizuki Ishizaka	1–6
(Japan) Yuichi Sasaki	4	(Japan) Yuichi Sasaki	2, 4–5
(Japan) Honda Formula Dream Project	5	(Japan) Toshiki Oyu	All
(Japan) Honda Formula Dream Project	6	(Japan) Ukyo Sasahara	All
(Japan) Honda Formula Dream Project	7	(Japan) Takuya Otaki	All
(Japan) Honda Formula Dream Project	8	(Japan) Yuki Tsunoda	All
(Japan) Field Motorsport	9	(Japan) Toshiki Haruyama	1–3
(Japan) Field Motorsport	9	(Japan) Takashi Hata	5–7
(Japan) Field Motorsport	25	(Japan) Tomoki Takahashi	All
(Japan) Field Motorsport	55	(Japan) Kiryu Hosoda	All
(Japan) Rn-sports	11	(Japan) Toshiki Komura	1–2
(Japan) B-MAX Racing Team	13	(Japan) Motoyoshi Yoshida	2–3
(Japan) B-MAX Racing Team	13	(Japan) Ayumu Iwasa	7
(Japan) B-MAX Racing Team	50	(Japan) Shinji Sawada	All
(Japan) B-MAX Racing Team	68	(Malaysia) Chia Wing Hoong	All
(Japan) Media Do Kageyama Racing	15	(Japan) Hiromichi Hayase	All
(Japan) Media Do Kageyama Racing	16	(Japan) Takuro Shinohara	All
(Japan) Buzz International	17	(Japan) Turbo Asahi	All
(Japan) Buzz International	18	(Japan) Junpei Kato	1–4, 7
(Japan) Buzz International	18	(Japan) Teppei Natori	5–6
(Japan) Buzz International	30	(Japan) "Dragon"	3
(Italy) VSR Lamborghini S.C. Formula Jr.	19	(India) Akash Gowda	1–6
(Italy) VSR Lamborghini S.C. Formula Jr.	63	(Japan) Rikiya Kanazawa	All
(Japan) RSS	21	(Japan) Seiya Jin	1–6
(Japan) N-SPEED	23	(Japan) "Yugo"	All
(Japan) Eagle Sport	27	(Japan) Wataru Yamaki	6
(Japan) Automotive Team MYST	29	(Japan) Tatsuya Ota	6
(Japan) HubAuto Racing	35	(Japan) Shunsuke Kohno	All
(Japan) HubAuto Racing	89	(Japan) Yuma Shoji	7
(Japan) Saccess Racing	38	(Japan) Miku Ikejima	2
(Japan) Saccess Racing	39	(Japan) Miku Ikejima	1
(Japan) Saccess Racing	39	(Japan) Yuki Urata	2–7
(Japan) NRS	44	(Japan) Sho Onodera	All
(Japan) NRS	83	(Japan) Takumi Ueki	1–3, 5–6
(Japan) NRS	83	(Japan) "Rising"	7
(Japan) Silver Star Racing	51	(Japan) Hiroyuki Kojima	1
(Japan) ARN Racing	54	(Germany) Gerhard Rickert	All
(Japan) Le Beausset Motorsports	60	(Japan) Kohta Kawaai	All
(Japan) Le Beausset Motorsports	61	(Japan) Reiji Hiraki	All
(Japan) Le Beausset Motorsports	62	(Japan) Yuya Hiraki	All
(Japan) leprix sport	70	(Japan) Miki Koyama	All
(Japan) C.S.I.-Reon Kids Racing	73	(Japan) Kotoka Goibuchi	1–2, 4–5
(Japan) Garage Chabatake	77	(Japan) Takeshi Ohi	All
(Japan) OTG Motor Sports	80	(Japan) Togo Suganami	All
(Japan) Zap Speed Racing Team	86	(Japan) Hachiro Osaka	1–2, 5–7
(Japan) Zap Speed Racing Team	99	(Singapore) Danial Frost	7

== Race calendar and results ==
All rounds were held in Japan and were part of the Super GT events.

Round		Circuit	Date	Pole position	Fastest lap	Winning driver	Winning team
1	R1	Okayama International Circuit, Mimasaka	7 April	(Japan) Ritomo Miyata	(Japan) Ritomo Miyata	(Japan) Ukyo Sasahara	(Japan) Honda Formula Dream Project
1	R2	Okayama International Circuit, Mimasaka	8 April	(Japan) Ritomo Miyata	(Japan) Toshiki Oyu	(Japan) Yuki Tsunoda	(Japan) Honda Formula Dream Project
2	R1	Fuji Speedway, Oyama	3 May	(Japan) Toshiki Oyu	(Japan) Tomoki Takahashi	(Japan) Ritomo Miyata	(Japan) TOM'S Spirit
2	R2	Fuji Speedway, Oyama	4 May	(Japan) Ritomo Miyata	(Japan) Ukyo Sasahara	(Japan) Ritomo Miyata	(Japan) TOM'S Spirit
3	R1	Autopolis, Hita	20 May	(Japan) Ukyo Sasahara	(Japan) Toshiki Oyu	(Japan) Ukyo Sasahara	(Japan) Honda Formula Dream Project
3	R2	Autopolis, Hita	21 May	(Japan) Toshiki Oyu	(Japan) Togo Suganami	(Japan) Toshiki Oyu	(Japan) Honda Formula Dream Project
4	R1	Sportsland SUGO, Murata	22 July	(Japan) Yuki Tsunoda	(Japan) Ukyo Sasahara	(Japan) Ukyo Sasahara	(Japan) Honda Formula Dream Project
4	R2	Sportsland SUGO, Murata	23 July	(Japan) Yuki Tsunoda	(Japan) Ritomo Miyata	(Japan) Takuya Otaki	(Japan) Honda Formula Dream Project
5	R1	Fuji Speedway, Oyama	5 August	(Japan) Toshiki Oyu	(Japan) Ritomo Miyata	(Japan) Yuki Tsunoda	(Japan) Honda Formula Dream Project
5	R2	Fuji Speedway, Oyama	6 August	(Japan) Toshiki Oyu	(Japan) Ukyo Sasahara	(Japan) Toshiki Oyu	(Japan) Honda Formula Dream Project
6	R1	Suzuka Circuit, Suzuka	26 August	(Japan) Yuki Tsunoda	(Japan) Yuki Tsunoda	(Japan) Yuki Tsunoda	(Japan) Honda Formula Dream Project
6	R2	Suzuka Circuit, Suzuka	27 August	(Japan) Yuki Tsunoda	(Japan) Ritomo Miyata	(Japan) Ritomo Miyata	(Japan) TOM'S Spirit
7	R1	Twin Ring Motegi, Motegi	11 November	(Japan) Ritomo Miyata	(Japan) Ritomo Miyata	(Japan) Ritomo Miyata	(Japan) TOM'S Spirit
7	R2	Twin Ring Motegi, Motegi	12 November	(Japan) Ritomo Miyata	(Japan) Ritomo Miyata	(Japan) Toshiki Oyu	(Japan) Honda Formula Dream Project

== Championship standings ==
Only the best thirteen results counted towards the championship. Points were awarded to the top 10 classified finishers in each race. No points are awarded for pole position or fastest lap.

Position	**1st**	**2nd**	**3rd**	**4th**	**5th**	**6th**	**7th**	**8th**	**9th**	**10th**
Points	25	18	15	12	10	8	6	4	2	1

=== Drivers' standings ===
Pos	Driver	OKA		FUJ1		AUT		SUG		FUJ2		SUZ		MOT		Points
1	(Japan) Ritomo Miyata	**2**	**6**	1	**1**	3	4	Ret	3	3	3	2	1	**1**	**3**	231
2	(Japan) Ukyo Sasahara	1	2	3	3	**1**	3	1	Ret	2	2	4	2	5	5	224
3	(Japan) Yuki Tsunoda	3	1	11	5	9	2	**5**	**Ret**	1	4	**1**	**3**	8	4	173
4	(Japan) Toshiki Oyu	24	5	**2**	2	2	**1**	Ret	Ret	**DNS**	**1**	3	4	Ret	1	166
5	(Japan) Takuya Otaki	7	3	14	13	Ret	12	2	1	6	9	7	8	7	8	94
6	(Japan) Shinji Sawada	5	4	Ret	7	13	23	4	4	25	Ret	18	14	3	2	85
7	(Japan) Shunsuke Kohno	11	11	6	6	5	8	8	6	4	5	5	5	10	12	85
8	(Japan) Kohta Kawaai	Ret	7	7	9	4	5	9	Ret	7	21	6	7	4	7	76
9	(Japan) Takuro Shinohara	8	Ret	5	12	6	14	6	Ret	8	6	9	9	2	6	72
10	(Japan) Tomoki Takahashi	4	9	4	4	7	19	7	5	13	27	Ret	13	11	13	60
11	(Japan) Yuya Hiraki	6	8	10	8	8	6	10	7	5	7	8	DSQ	12	11	56
12	(Japan) Mizuki Ishizaka	10	NC	20	10	27	7	3	2	12	17	11	15			41
13	(Japan) Teppei Natori									9	8	Ret	6			14
14	(Japan) Sota Ogawa													6	9	10
15	(Japan) Togo Suganami	9	10	9	11	DNS	15	14	9	11	10	19	25	17	29	8
16	(Japan) Reiji Hiraki	15	13	8	15	11	11	11	10	10	11	13	16	14	16	6
17	(Japan) Kiryu Hosoda	17	22	Ret	Ret	14	Ret	12	8	15	15	23	11	32	10	5
18	(Japan) Turbo Asahi	13	21	12	18	20	10	15	24	17	12	12	26	9	17	3
19	(Japan) Yuki Urata			Ret	14	16	9	Ret	21	19	13	Ret	10	31	14	3
20	(Japan) Seiya Jin	12	Ret	13	17	10	18	13	22	14	16	10	12			2
21	(Japan) Junpei Kato	16	14	Ret	29	12	13	Ret	11					19	19	0
22	(Japan) Rikiya Kanazawa	18	17	16	Ret	15	17	16	12	22	14	16	Ret	16	23	0
23	(Japan) Hirokuni Kojima	14	12													0
24	(India) Akash Gowda	21	18	17	20	Ret	16	23	13	16	20	15	Ret			0
25	(Japan) Yuma Shoji													13	18	0
26	(Japan) Kotoka Goibuchi	19	15	19	30			19	14	23	24					0
27	(Japan) Wataru Yamaki											14	18			0
28	(Japan) Ayumu Iwasa													15	15	0
29	(Japan) Takeshi Ohi	20	16	18	23	Ret	20	17	15	18	18	17	19	21	24	0
30	(Japan) Toshiki Haruyama	23	24	15	16	WD	WD									0
31	(Malaysia) Chia Wing Hoong	29	20	21	19	17	Ret	18	16	21	19	22	20	26	22	0
32	(Japan) Tatsuya Ota											20	17			0
33	(Japan) Yuichi Sasaki			WD	WD			21	17	26	25					0
34	(Japan) Miki Koyama	33	DSQ	23	22	18	21	Ret	DNS	20	30	21	21	20	20	0
35	(Singapore) Danial Frost													18	21	0
36	(Germany) Gerhard Rickert	30	28	30	30	24	27	Ret	18	28	31	28	29	30	Ret	0
37	(Japan) Keiji Nakao	27	19	24	24			DNS	19	Ret	23	25	23	23	32	0
38	(Japan) Sho Onedera	26	25	25	Ret	19	Ret	Ret	DNS	24	26	24	22	24	26	0
39	(Japan) Hiromichi Hayase	28	23	27	25	22	25	20	23	Ret	22	26	24	25	28	0
40	(Japan) "Yugo"	32	30	29	28	26	28	22	20	27	28	27	28	29	31	0
41	(Japan) Miku Ikejima	22	26	22	21											0
42	(Japan) Takumi Ueki	WD	WD	Ret	Ret	21	24			WD	WD	WD	WD			0
43	(Japan) "Dragon"					23	22									0
44	(Japan) Takashi Hata									WD	WD	WD	WD	22	25	0
45	(Japan) Motoyoshi Yoshida			26	26	25	26									0
46	(Japan) Toshiki Komura	25	29	WD	WD											0
47	(Japan) Hachiro Osaka	31	27	28	27					29	29	29	27	27	30	0
48	(Japan) "Rising"													28	27	0
Pos	Driver	OKA		FUJ1		AUT		SUG		FUJ2		SUZ		MOT		Points

Colour	Result
Gold	Winner
Silver	Second place
Bronze	Third place
Green	Points classification
Blue	Non-points classification
Blue	Non-classified finish (NC)
Purple	Retired, not classified (Ret)
Red	Did not qualify (DNQ)
Red	Did not pre-qualify (DNPQ)
Black	Disqualified (DSQ)
White	Did not start (DNS)
White	Withdrew (WD)
White	Race cancelled (C)
Blank	Did not practice (DNP)
Blank	Did not arrive (DNA)
Blank	Excluded (EX)

**Bold** – Pole
Italics – Fastest Lap
† — Did not finish, but classified

=== Teams' standings ===
Pos	Tean	Pts.
1	(Japan) Honda Formula Dream Project	314
2	(Japan) TOM'S Spirit	231
3	(Japan) Le Beausset Motorsports	102
4	(Japan) B-Max Racing Team	85
5	(Japan) HubAuto Racing	85
6	(Japan) Media Do Kageyama Racing	72
7	(Japan) Field Motorsport	61
8	(Japan) Sutekina Racing Team	41
9	(Japan) Buzz International	17
10	(Japan) OTG Motor Sports	8
11	(Japan) Saccess Racing	3
12	(Japan) RSS	2
