= Reiji Hiraki =

Japanese racing driver

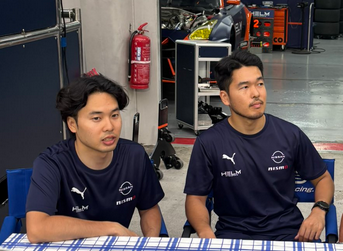
- Hiraki (right) at the 2025 Super GT Malaysia Festival
- Nationality: (Japan) Japanese
- Born: 24 January 1998 (age 28) Mito, Ibaraki, Japan

Super GT - GT300 career
- Debut season: 2018
- Current team: HELM Motorsports
- Car number: 62
- Former teams: Team Mach
- Starts: 29
- Wins: 0
- Podiums: 1
- Poles: 0
- Fastest laps: 0
- Best finish: 18th in 2022

Previous series
- 2022 2022 2016-2020: Super Taikyu - ST-X; Super Formula Lights; F4 Japanese Championship

Championship titles
- 2022: Super Taikyu - ST-X

Reiji Hiraki (平木 玲次, Hiraki Reiji; born 24 January 1998) is a Japanese racing driver currently competing in Super GT as a third driver for HELM Motorsports.

== Career ==
=== Formula 4 ===
Hiraki competed in F4 Japanese Championship from 2016 to 2020. He ended his last F4 season as a runner up while Hibiki Taira won the title.

=== Super GT ===
Hiraki joined Team Mach alongside his brother Yuya in 2021. Reiji continued the next season with Sim-racer Yusuke Tomobayashi.

HELM Motorsports made their season debut in the GT300 class of Super GT in 2024. With Kohei Hirate as the main driver, alongside Yuya Hiraki, and Hiraki himself as the third driver.

=== Super Formula Lights ===
In 2022, Hiraki, alongside his older brother Yuya, joined Super Formula Lights with their own team HELM Motorsports.

=== Super Taikyu ===
Hiraki, alongside his older brother Yuya's HELM Motorsports, made their debut in 2022 in Super Taikyu ST-X Class, with Yutaka Toriba as the third driver. In that season, they won the ST-X Class.

== Racing record ==
=== Career summary ===
Season	Series	Team	Races	Wins	Poles	FLaps	Podiums	Points	Position
2016	F4 Japanese Championship	Le Beausset Motorsports	14	0	0	0	0	8	20th
2017	F4 Japanese Championship	Le Beausset Motorsports	14	0	0	0	0	6	16th
2018	F4 Japanese Championship	Inging Motorsport	14	0	0	0	0	38	13th
2019	F4 Japanese Championship	Media Do Kageyama Racing	14	0	0	2	3	129	4th
2020	F4 Japanese Championship	HELM Motorsports	12	2	2	2	7	180.5	**2nd**
2020	Super Taikyu - ST-3	HELM Motorsports	2	1	1	0	2	44‡	5th‡
2021	Super GT - GT300	Team Mach	8	0	0	0	0	6	22nd
2021	Super Taikyu - ST-3	HELM Motorsports	6	1	1	0	3	101.5‡	**3rd‡**
2022	Super Taikyu - ST-X	HELM Motorsports	7	2	1	0	3	134.5	**1st‡**
2022	Super Formula Lights	HELM Motorsports	12	0	0	0	1	9	9th
2022	Super GT - GT300	Team Mach	8	0	0	0	1	15	18th
2023	Super Taikyu - ST-X	HELM Motorsports	7	0	2	0	3	117	**3rd**
2024	Super GT - GT300	HELM Motorsports	5	0	0	0	0	1	20th
2025	Super GT - GT300	HELM Motorsports	8	0	0	0	0	18	23rd
2026	Super GT - GT300	HELM Motorsports	8	0	0	0	0	19	29th

=== Complete F4 Japanese Championship results ===
(key) (Races in bold indicate pole position) (Races in italics indicate fastest lap)

Year	Team	1	2	3	4	5	6	7	8	9	10	11	12	13	14	DC	Pts
2016	Le Beausset Motorsports	OKA; 1; 25	OKA; 2; 13	FUJ1; 1; 12	FUJ1; 2; 11	SUG; 1 Ret	SUG; 2; 7	FUJ2; 1; 32	FUJ2; 2; 23	FUJ2; 3 Ret	SUZ; 1; 11	SUZ; 2; 20	MOT; 1; 21	MOT; 2; 12	MOT; 3; 9	20th	8
2017	Le Beausset Motorsports	OKA; 1; 15	OKA; 2; 13	FUJ1; 1; 8	FUJ1; 2; 15	AUT; 1; 11	AUT; 2; 11	SUG; 1; 11	SUG; 2; 10	FUJ2; 1; 10	FUJ2; 2; 11	SUZ; 1; 13	SUZ; 2; 16	MOT; 1; 14	MOT; 2; 16	16th	6
2018	Inging Motorsport	OKA; 1; 7	OKA; 2; 7	FUJ1; 1; 5	FUJ1; 2; 5	SUZ; 1 Ret	SUZ; 2; 12	FUJ2; 1; 28	FUJ2; 2; 8	SUG; 1; 12	SUG; 2; 11	AUT; 1; 12	AUT; 2; 9	MOT; 1 Ret	MOT; 2 Ret	13th	38
2019	Media Do Kageyama Racing	OKA; 1; 5	OKA; 2; 7	FUJ1; 1; 10	FUJ1; 2; 2	SUZ; 1; 8	SUZ; 2; 8	FUJ2; 1 Ret	FUJ2; 2; 2	AUT; 1; 8	AUT; 2; 4	SUG; 1; 4	SUG; 2; 5	MOT; 1; 2	MOT; 2; 4	4th	129
2020	HELM Motorsports	FUJ1; 1; 1	FUJ1; 2; 4	FUJ1; 3; 4	SUZ; 1; 4	SUZ; 2; 3	SUZ; 3; 2	MOT; 1; 2	MOT; 2; 3	MOT; 3; 5	FUJ2; 1; 6	FUJ2; 2; 2	FUJ2; 3; 1			2nd	180.5

==== Complete Super GT results ====
Year	Team	Car	Class	1	2	3	4	5	6	7	8	9	DC	Pts
2021	Team Mach	Toyota 86 MC GT300	GT300	OKA; 25	FUJ1; 12	MOT; 27	SUZ; 5	SUG; 22	AUT; 21	MOT2; 18	FUJ2; 25		22nd	6
2022	Team Mach	Toyota 86 MC GT300	GT300	OKA; 18	FUJ; 24	SUZ; 2	FUJ; 17	SUZ; 19	SUG; 21	AUT; 25	MOT; Ret		18th	15
2024	HELM Motorsports	Nissan GT-R Nismo GT3	GT300	OKA	FUJ; 10	SUZ; 11	FUJ; 13	SUG	AUT; 17	MOT	SUZ; 16		20th	1
2025	HELM Motorsports	Nissan GT-R Nismo GT3	GT300	OKA; 19	FUJ; Ret	SEP; 11	FS1 (19)	FS2; 12	SUZ; 15	SUG; 10	AUT; 13	MOT; 15	23rd	18
2026	HELM Motorsports	Nissan GT-R Nismo GT3	GT300	OKA; 24	FUJ; 13	FUJ; 8	SUZ; 19	SUG; 19	AUT; 8	MOT; 17	MOT; 20		29th	19

^{‡} Half points awarded as less than 75% of race distance was completed.
^{(Number)} Driver did not take part in this sprint race, points are still awarded for the teammate's result.
^{*} Season still in progress.

==== Complete Super Formula Lights results ====
(key) (Races in bold indicate pole position) (Races in italics indicate fastest lap)

Year	Entrant	1	2	3	4	5	6	7	8	9	10	11	12	13	14	15	16	17	18	Pos	Points
2022	HELM Motorsports	FUJ; 1; 6	FUJ; 2; 8	FUJ; 3; 8	SUZ; 1; 9	SUZ; 2; 7	SUZ; 3; 9	AUT; 1; 7	AUT; 2; 4	AUT; 3; 8	SUG; 1; 3	SUG; 2; 12	SUG; 3; 7	MOT; 1 WD	MOT; 2 WD	MOT; 3 WD	OKA; 1	OKA; 2	OKA; 3	9th	9
