= Miki Koyama =

Japanese racing driver

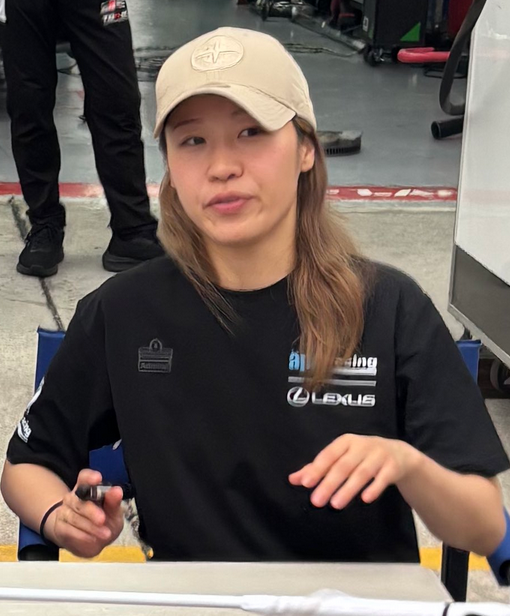
- Koyama at the 2025 Super GT Malaysia Festival
- Nationality: (Japan) Japanese
- Born: 5 September 1997 (age 29) Yokohama, Kanagawa Prefecture

Super GT Series career
- Debut season: 2023
- Current team: apr
- Car number: 31
- Former teams: Anest Iwata Racing with Arnage, R'Qs Motor Sports
- Starts: 24
- Championships: 0
- Wins: 0
- Podiums: 2
- Poles: 0
- Fastest laps: 0
- Best finish: 17th in 2026

Previous series
- 2015–2019 2017, 2024 2019–2020 2019, 2021 2020, 2022 2023 2024: F4 Japanese Championship; Super Taikyu Series; F3 Asian Championship; W Series; Formula Regional Japanese Championship; Macau Formula 4 Race; Lamborghini Super Trofeo Asia

Championship titles
- 2022 2017–2018: Formula Regional Japanese Championship; Kyojo Cup

Miki Koyama (小山 美姫, Koyama Miki; born 5 September 1997 in Yokohama) is a Japanese racing driver, currently racing in the Super GT Series GT300 class for äpr. She is best known for her time racing in the W Series from 2019 to 2021, and for becoming the first woman to win an FIA-sanctioned, all-gender single-seater championship when she won the 2022 Formula Regional Japanese Championship. She is part of the Toyota Gazoo Racing Driver Challenge program.

== Biography ==
=== Early career ===
Having started racing in karts, Koyama attended the Formula Toyota Racing School before moving to Japanese F4 in 2015. She was the first champion of the all-women's Kyojo Cup series in 2017, and repeated as champion in 2018.

=== W Series ===
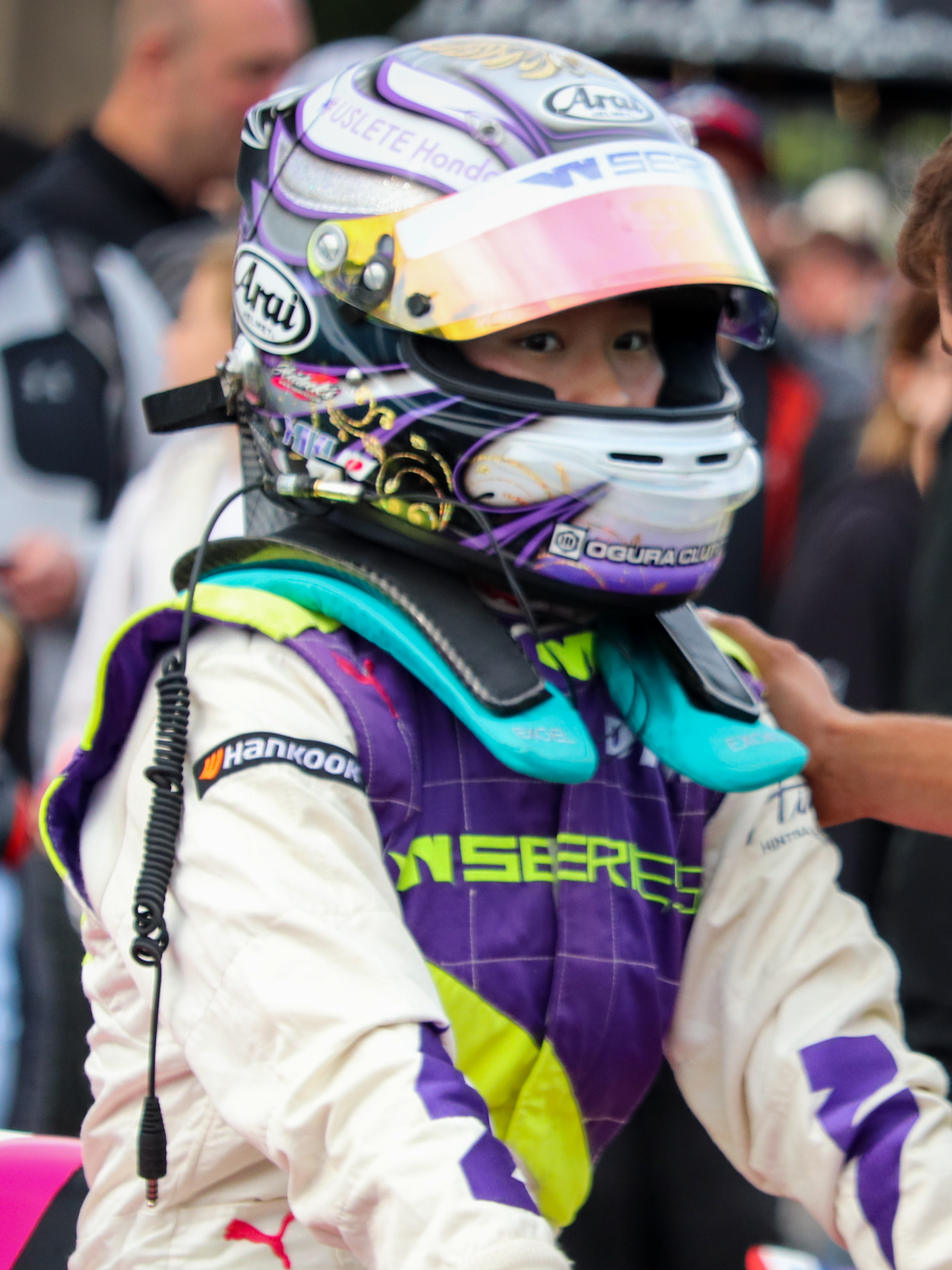
Koyama in 2019

In 2019, Koyama was announced as one of the 18 permanent drivers for the inaugural season of the W Series. At the first W Series round at Hockenheim, Koyama qualified 17th and finished seventh after setting the fastest lap of the race. During the remainder of the season, Koyama earned three more points finishes en route to seventh in the championship, and was named as a returning competitor for the 2020 W Series. While the 2020 season was abandoned due to the onset of the COVID-19 pandemic, Koyama returned to the series when it resumed in 2021. She also made a one-off entry into the Super Formula Lights championship at Fuji Speedway.

=== Formula Regional Japanese Championship ===
After two seasons in the W Series, Koyama was named as a Toyota Gazoo Racing Driver Challenge (TGR-DC) academy driver for the 2022 season. She raced full-time in the Formula Regional Japanese Championship for Super License, with backing from Toyota. Koyama won seven races and clinched the series title at the September meeting at Fuji.

=== Super GT ===
On 7 February 2023, Koyama was announced as the third driver for Anest Iwata Racing with Arnage in the 2023 Super GT Series. Koyama became the first woman to race in the championship since Cyndie Allemann in 2012. She successfully passed her rookie orientation test at Fuji Speedway on 21 April, and competed for the first time in the fourth round at Fuji where she finished 19th in class.

Koyama moved to Arnage Racing-affiliated R'Qs Motor Sports in 2024, and made three appearances in their Mercedes-AMG GT3 Evo.

For 2025, Koyama would join apr, driving the Lexus LC500h GT300 alongside series rookie Oliver Rasmussen and third driver Yuki Nemoto.

=== Other Series ===
In 2024, Koyama drove the apr Lexus RC F GT3 in the Super Taikyu Series. In the fifth round of the championship at Suzuka, Koyama became the second female driver to take an overall victory in a Super Taikyu race, and the first since Kumi Sato in 1993.

That same year, Koyama made her Lamborghini Super Trofeo Asia debut for Iron Lynx Theodore Racing. Koyama and co-driver Hon Chio Leong scored five second-place finishes en route to second in the Pro class standings behind Dan Wells.

At the end of 2024, Koyama entered the Toyota Gazoo Racing GR Cup North America finale at Indianapolis, driving for Hattori Motorsports. She took part in Formula E's all-female pre-season test with Lola Yamaha ABT, and the Super Formula post-season winter test at Suzuka with KCMG.

== Racing record ==
=== Career summary ===
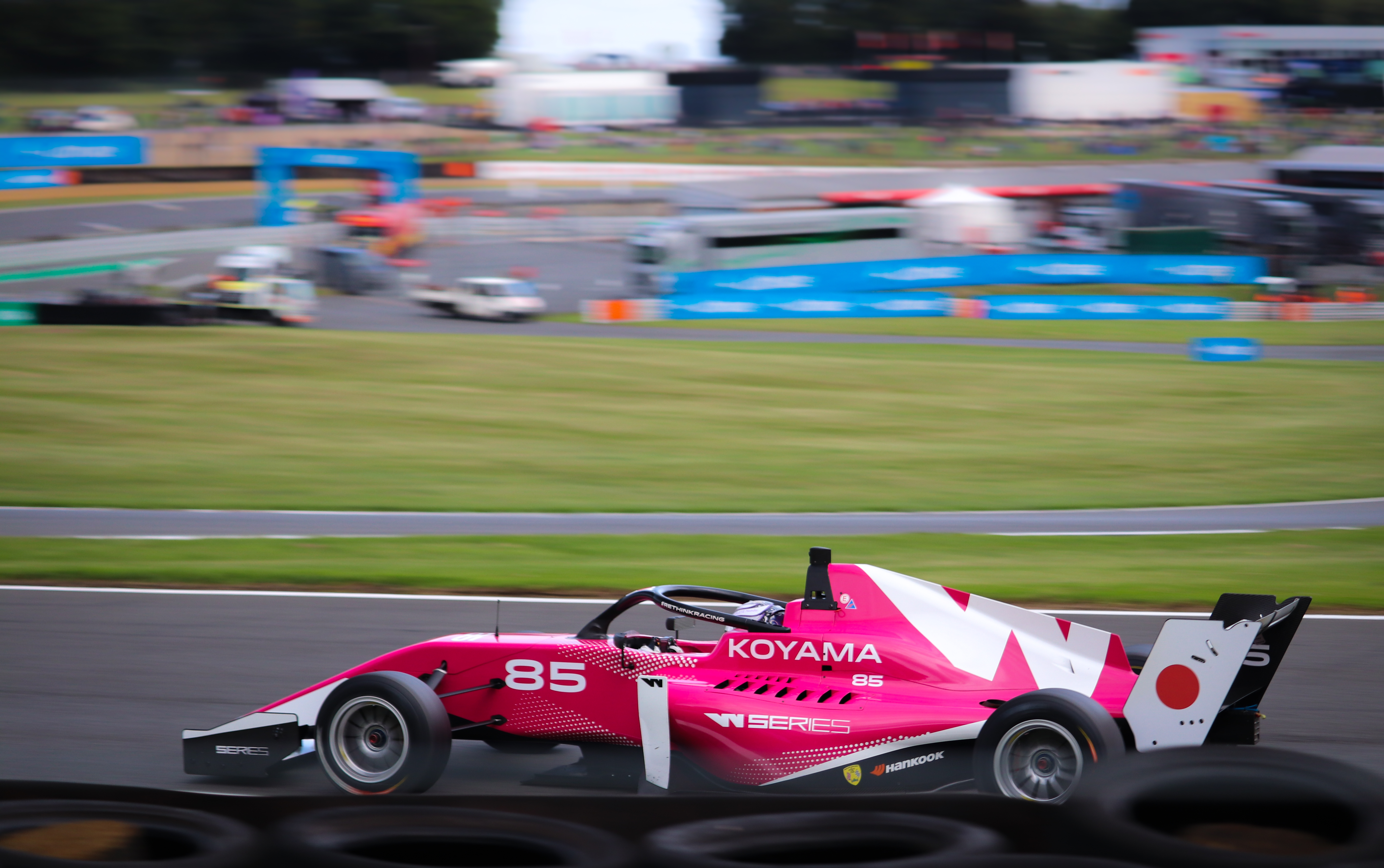
Koyama competing in the 2019 W Series Brands Hatch round.

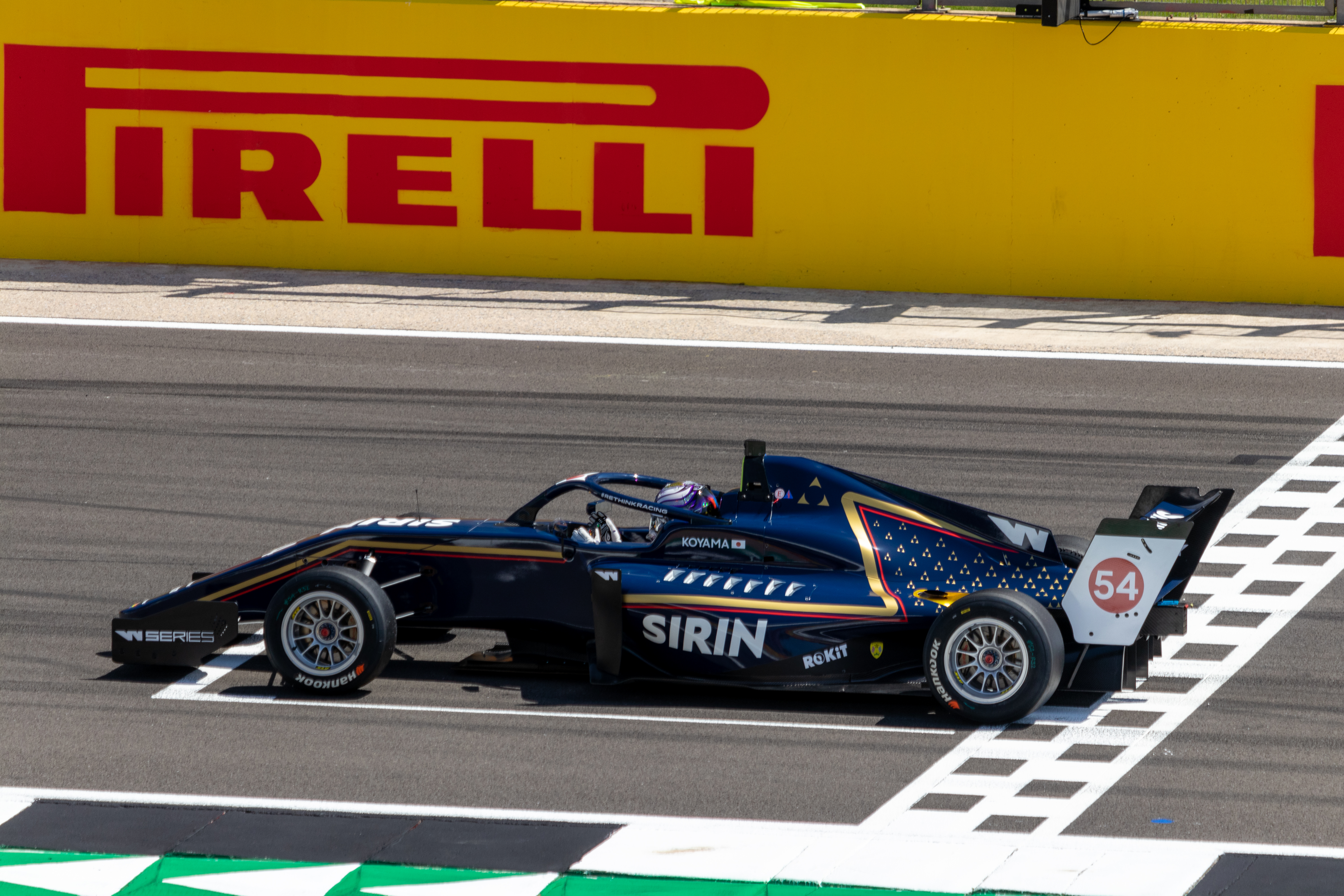
Koyama competing in the 2021 W Series Silverstone round.

Season	Series	Team	Races	Wins	Poles	F/Laps	Podiums	Points	Position
2015	F4 Japanese Championship	miNami aoYama with SARD	4	0	0	0	0	0	50th
2016	F4 Japanese Championship	miNami aoYama Project	3	0	0	0	0	0	32nd
2016	F4 Japanese Championship	Saitama Toyopet GreenBrave	3	0	0	0	0	0	32nd
2017	F4 Japanese Championship	leprix sport	13	0	0	0	0	0	34th
2017	Super Taikyu Series – ST-4	T's Concept	1	0	0	0	0	0	NC
2017	Kyojo Cup	J-Gear	2	2	1	2	2	40	**1st**
2018	F4 Japanese Championship	Field Motorsports	14	0	0	0	0	10	15th
2018	Kyojo Cup	Wildcat Competition	4	3	4	4	3	75	**1st**
2019	W Series	Hitech GP	6	0	0	1	0	30	7th
2019	F4 Japanese Championship	Honda Formula Dream Project	10	0	0	0	0	7	17th
2019	F3 Asian Winter Series	B-Max Racing	3	0	0	0	0	0	NC
2019	F3 Asian Championship	B-Max Racing	3	0	0	0	0	18	15th
2019	F3 Asian Championship	BlackArts Racing Team	3	0	0	0	0	18	15th
2019–20	F3 Asian Championship	BlackArts Racing Team	3	0	0	0	0	3	16th
2020	Formula Regional Japanese Championship	Zap Speed	2	0	0	0	0	16	20th
2021	W Series	Sirin Racing	8	0	0	0	0	14	14th
2021	Super Formula Lights	B-Max Engineering	3	0	0	0	0	0	13th
2022	Formula Regional Japanese Championship	Super License	17	7	5	8	17	349	**1st**
2023	Super GT – GT300	Anest Iwata Racing with Arnage	5	0	0	0	0	0	NC
2023	Macau Formula 4 Race	Super License	2	0	0	0	0	N/A	DNF
2023	TGR GR86/BRZ Cup	Kobe Toyopet Motor Sports	6	0	0	0	0	0	NC
2024	Super GT – GT300	R'Qs Motor Sports	3	0	0	0	0	0	NC
2024	Super Taikyu – ST-X	apr	6	1	1	0	5	116	4th‡
2024	Lamborghini Super Trofeo Asia - Pro	SJM Iron Lynx Theodore Racing	10	0	1	0	10	127	**2nd**
2024	Toyota Gazoo Racing GR Cup North America	Hattori Motorsports	2	0	0	0	0	0	NC
2025	Super GT – GT300	apr	8	0	0	0	0	4	28th
2025	Nürburgring Langstrecken-Serie – SP8T	Toyota Gazoo Racing	2	0	0	0	0	NC^{†}	NC^{†}
2025	Nürburgring Langstrecken-Serie – SP8T	Toyo Tires with Ring Racing	5	0	0	0	0	NC^{†}	NC^{†}
2025	NLS-Light – SP8T	Toyo Tires with Ring Racing	1	0	0	0	0	NC^{†}	NC^{†}
2026	Super GT – GT300	apr	8	0	0	0	2	41	17th
2026	Nürburgring Langstrecken-Serie – SP10	Toyo Tires with Ring Racing	1	0	0	0	0	NC*^{†}	NC*^{†}

* Season still in progress.
^{†} As Koyama was a guest driver, she was ineligible for points.

=== Complete F4 Japanese Championship Results ===
(key) (Races in bold indicate pole position) (Races in italics indicate fastest lap)

Year	Team	1	2	3	4	5	6	7	8	9	10	11	12	13	14	Rank	Points
2015	miNami aoYama with SARD	OKA; 1	OKA; 2	FSW; 1	FSW; 2	FSW; 1	FSW; 2	SUZ; 1	SUZ; 2	SUG; 1	SUG; 2	AUT; 1; 28	AUT; 2; 26	MOT; 1; 26	MOT; 2; 26	50th	0
2016	miNami aoYama Project	OKA; 1 Ret	OKA; 2; 11	FUJ; 1	FUJ; 2	SUG; 1	SUG; 2	FUJ; 1	FUJ; 2	FUJ; 3	SUZ; 1	SUZ; 2				32nd	0
2016	Saitama Toyopet GreenBrave												MOT; 1; 28	MOT; 2; 21	MOT; 3; 24	32nd	0
2017	leprix sport	OKA; 1; 33	OKA; 2 DSQ	FUJ; 1; 23	FUJ; 2; 22	AUT; 1; 18	AUT; 2; 21	SUG; 1 Ret	SUG; 2 DNS	FUJ; 1; 20	FUJ; 2; 30	SUZ; 1; 21	SUZ; 2; 21	MOT; 1; 20	MOT; 2; 20	34th	0
2018	Field Motorsports	OKA; 1; 16	OKA; 2; 12	FUJ1; 1; 7	FUJ1; 2; 14	SUZ; 1; 14	SUZ; 2; 13	FUJ2; 1; 9	FUJ2; 2; 9	SUG; 1; 15	SUG; 2; 17	AUT; 1; 11	AUT; 2; 16	MOT; 1; 12	MOT; 2 Ret	15th	10
2019	Honda Formula Dream Project	OKA; 1	OKA; 2	FUJ; 1	FUJ; 2	SUZ; 1; 17	SUZ; 2 Ret	FUJ; 1; 8	FUJ; 2; 13	AUT; 1; 13	AUT; 2; 14	SUG; 1; 13	SUG; 2; 9	MOT; 1; 10	MOT; 2; 11	17th	7

=== Complete F3 Asian Championship results ===
(key) (Races in bold indicate pole position) (Races in italics indicate fastest lap)

Year	Team	1	2	3	4	5	6	7	8	9	10	11	12	13	14	15	DC	Points
2019	B-Max Racing Team	SEP; 1	SEP; 2	SEP; 3	CHA; 1; 9	CHA; 2; 8	CHA; 3; 11										15th	18
2019	BlackArts Racing Team							SUZ; 1; 12	SUZ; 2; 7	SUZ; 3; 7	SIC; 1	SIC; 2	SIC; 3	SIC; 1	SIC; 2	SIC; 3	15th	18
2019–20	BlackArts Racing Team	SEP; 1	SEP; 2	SEP; 3	DUB; 1	DUB; 2	DUB; 3	ABU; 1	ABU; 2	ABU; 3	SEP; 1; 10	SEP; 2; 10†	SEP; 3; 9	CHA; 1	CHA; 2	CHA; 3	16th	6

=== Complete W Series results ===
(key) (Races in bold indicate pole position) (Races in italics indicate fastest lap)

Year	Team	1	2	3	4	5	6	7	8	DC	Points
2019	Hitech GP	HOC; 7	ZOL; 8	MIS; 4	NOR; 6	ASS; Ret	BRH; 20			7th	30
2021	Sirin Racing	RBR; 5	RBR; 18	SIL; Ret	HUN; 12	SPA; 9	ZAN; 10	COA; 10	COA; 12	14th	14

=== Complete Formula Regional Japanese Championship results ===
(key) (Races in bold indicate pole position) (Races in italics indicate fastest lap)

Year	Entrant	1	2	3	4	5	6	7	8	9	10	11	12	13	14	15	16	17	Pos	Points
2020	Zap Speed	FUJ; 1	FUJ; 2	FUJ; 3	SUG; 1	SUG; 2	SUG; 3	FUJ; 1; 7	FUJ; 2; 5	MOT; 1	MOT; 2	OKA; 1	OKA; 2	AUT; 1	AUT; 2				20th	16
2022	Super License	FUJ1; 1; 2	FUJ1; 2; 2	FUJ1; 3; 3	OKA; 1; 2	OKA; 2; 1	OKA; 3; 1	**MOT**; **1**; 1	**MOT**; **2**; 1	**MOT**; **3**; 1	SUG; 1; 2	SUG; 2; 2	SUG; 3; 1	**FUJ2**; **1**; 2	**FUJ2**; **2**; 1	FUJ2; 3; 2	SUZ; 1; 2	SUZ; 2; 3	1st	349

=== Complete Super Formula Lights results ===
(key) (Races in bold indicate pole position) (Races in italics indicate fastest lap)

Year	Entrant	1	2	3	4	5	6	7	8	9	10	11	12	13	14	15	16	17	18	Pos	Points
2021	B-Max Engineering	FUJ; 1; 7	FUJ; 2; 8	FUJ; 3; 7	SUZ; 1	SUZ; 2	SUZ; 3	AUT; 1	AUT; 2	AUT; 3	SUG; 1	SUG; 2	SUG; 3	MOT; 1	MOT; 2	MOT; 3	MOT; 1	MOT; 2	MOT; 3	13th	0

=== Complete Super GT results ===
(key) (Races in bold indicate pole position) (Races in italics indicate fastest lap)

Year	Team	Car	Class	1	2	3	4	5	6	7	8	9	DC	Points
2023	Anest Iwata Racing with Arnage	Lexus RC F GT3	GT300	OKA	FUJ; 14	SUZ; 17	FUJ; 19	SUZ; 10‡	SUG	AUT; 11	MOT		NC	0
2024	R'Qs Motor Sports	Mercedes-AMG GT3 Evo	GT300	OKA	FUJ	SUZ; 24	FUJ; 21	SUG	AUT; 23	MOT	SUZ		NC	0
2025	apr	Lexus LC 500h GT	GT300	OKA; 22	FUJ; 19	SEP; 12	FS1 (17)	FS2; Ret	SUZ; 17	SUG; 23†	AUT; DSQ	MOT; 18	28th	4
2026	apr	Lexus LC 500h GT	GT300	OKA; 3	FUJ; 3	FUJ; 14	SUZ; 11	SUG; 15	AUT; Ret	MOT; Ret	MOT; 15		17th	41

^{‡} Did not run during the race as a third driver and was ineligible for championship points.
^{(Number)} Driver did not take part in this sprint race, points are still awarded for the teammate's result.
^{†} Driver did not finish, but was classified as she completed over 90% of the race distance.

=== Complete Formula 4 South East Asia Championship results ===
(key) (Races in bold indicate pole position; races in italics indicate fastest lap)

Year	Entrant	1	2	3	4	5	6	7	8	9	10	11	Pos	Points
2023	Super License	ZHU; 1	ZHU; 2	ZHU; 3	MAC; 1; 11	MAC; 2 Ret	SEP; 1	SEP; 2	SEP; 3	SEP; 1	SEP; 2	SEP; 3	NC†	0

† As Koyama was a guest driver, she was ineligible for points

== See also ==
- List of female racing drivers
