= Teppei Natori =

Japanese racing driver

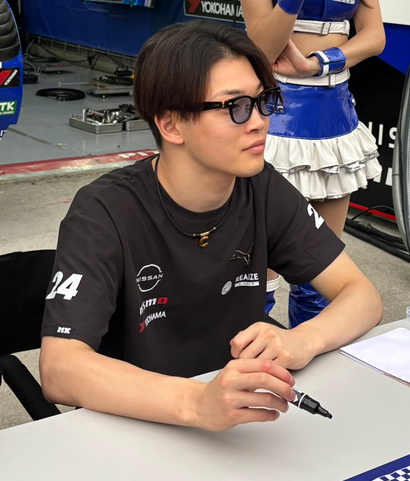
- Natori at the 2025 Super GT Malaysia Festival
- Nationality: (Japan) Japanese
- Born: 11 September 2000 (age 26) Shōwa, Yamanashi, Japan

Super GT - GT500 career
- Debut season: 2024
- Current team: Kondo Racing
- Car number: 24
- Former teams: Team UpGarage; Tomei Sports
- Starts: 24
- Wins: 1
- Podiums: 1
- Poles: 1
- Fastest laps: 1
- Best finish: 13th in 2026

Previous series
- 2021–2023 2020–2021 2019 2019 2017–2018: Super GT - GT300; Super Formula Lights; FIA Formula 3 Euroformula Open; Formula 4 Japan

Championship titles
- 2021: Super Formula Lights

Teppei Natori (名取鉄平, Natori Teppei; born 11 September 2000) is a Japanese racing driver who currently competes in Super GT for Kondo Racing in the GT500 class. He is best known for becoming Super Formula Lights champion in 2021.

== Career ==
=== Karting ===
Natori started karting in 2014 when he was fourteen. He finished sixth in the ROK Cup International Final.

=== Japanese F4 ===
In 2017, Natori made his single seater debut with Buzz International in the Japanese F4 series. He finished three of the four races he competed at in the points, gaining him fourteen points and 13th in the standings. In 2018, Natori got a full-time drive with the Honda Formula Dream Project, where he would finish on the podium eleven times, three of those times being wins. Natori finished runner up to teammate and Red Bull Junior driver Yuki Tsunoda.

=== European Racing ===
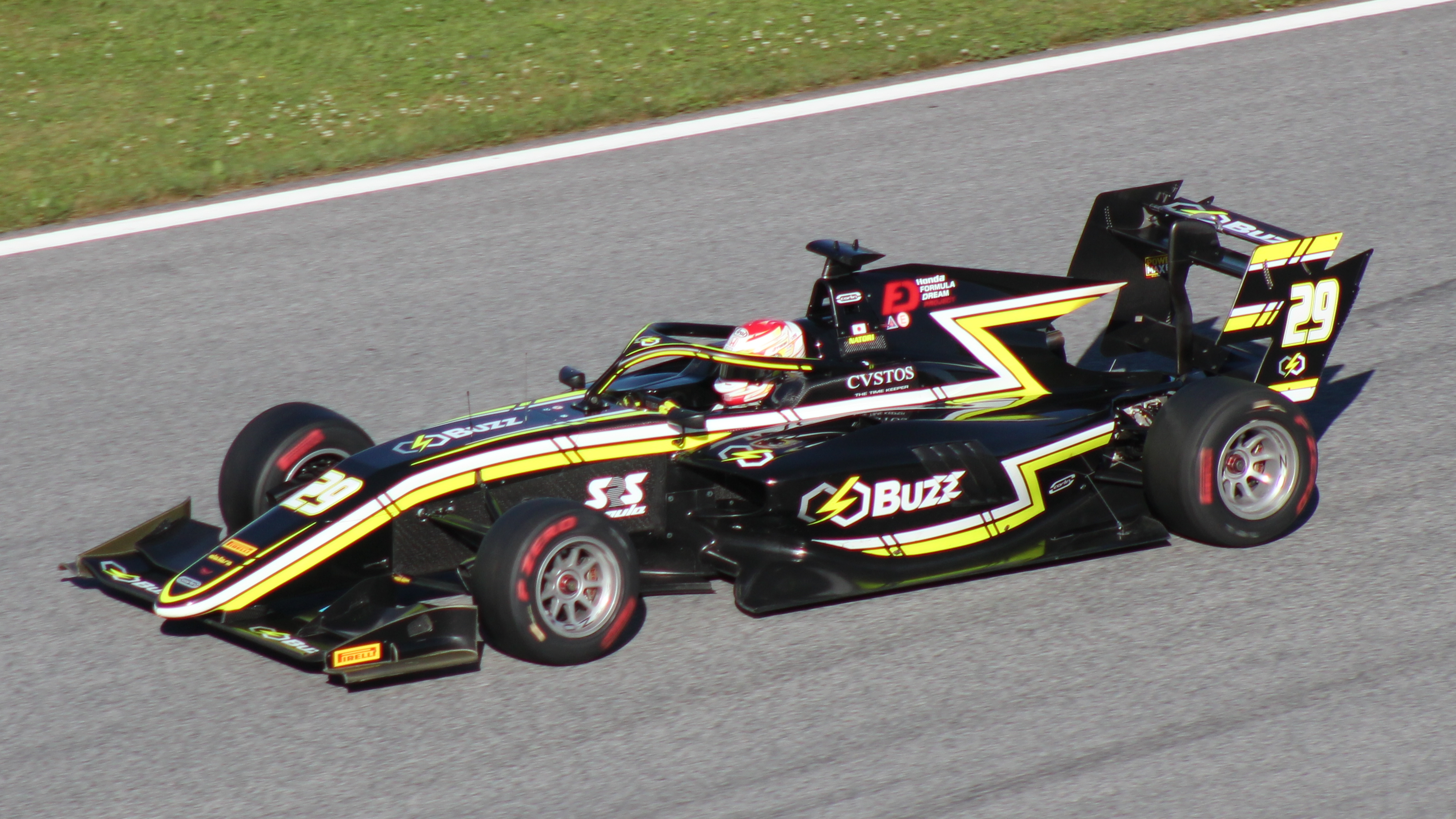
Natori in 2019

Following his Japanese F4 success, Natori re-joined Carlin Buzz for the 2019 FIA F3 season. Natori finished the season with one point after an eighth place at Circuit de Spa-Francorchamps. Natori also drove for Carlin in the Euroformula Open Championship. He finished on the podium three times and at the second race in Circuit de Barcelona-Catalunya Natori took pole, fastest lap and the race win. The only other driver to do this that season was the champion, Marino Sato.

=== Super Formula & Super Formula Lights ===
In 2020, Natori returned to his native Japan to contest the inaugural season of the newly rebranded Super Formula Lights championship with Toda Racing, and he claimed fourth. The next season, Natori's season was in doubt after being dropped by Honda works Factory. But he managed to get the necessary funding after settled a fundraiser. He competed with B-Max Racing for 2021 season, and he won the title off from Giuliano Alesi.

Natori also had one cameo race in 2020 in Super Formula with B-Max Racing, but unfortunately, he could not compete due to medical reason.

== Racing record ==
=== Career summary ===
Season	Series	Team	Races	Wins	Poles	F/Laps	Podiums	Points	Position
2017	F4 Japanese Championship	Buzz International	4	0	0	0	0	14	13th
2018	F4 Japanese Championship	Honda Formula Dream Project	14	4	4	1	11	231	**2nd**
2019	FIA Formula 3 Championship	Carlin Buzz Racing	16	0	0	0	0	1	24th
2019	Euroformula Open Championship	Carlin	13	1	2	1	3	115	6th
2019	Euroformula Open Winter Series	Carlin	2	0	0	0	2	30	**3rd**
2020	Super Formula Lights	Toda Racing	17	0	1	0	6	54	4th
2020	Super Formula	Buzz Racing with B-MAX	0	0	0	0	0	0	NC
2021	Super Formula Lights	B-Max Racing	17	6	6	5	11	109	**1st**
2021	Super GT - GT300	Team UpGarage	8	0	1	0	0	4	25th
2021	Super Taikyu - ST-Z	B-Max Engineering	1	0	0	0	0	14‡	13th‡
2022	Super GT - GT300	Tomei Sports	1	0	0	0	0	1	36th
2022	Super Taikyu - ST-Q	Max Racing							
2022	Super Taikyu - ST-3	Team ZeroOne	6	0	0	0	2	49‡	5th‡
2023	Super GT - GT300	Kondō Racing	8	1	1	0	1	50	**3rd**
2023	Super Taikyu - ST-Z	Team ZeroOne	6	0	1	1	3	77.5‡	4th‡
2024	Super GT - GT500	Kondo Racing	8	0	1	1	0	8	14th
2024	Super Taikyu - ST-Z	Team ZeroOne	7	1	0	0	2	63.5‡	8th‡
2025	Super GT - GT500	Kondo Racing	8	1	0	0	1	21.5	14th
2025	Super Taikyu - ST-Z	Team ZeroOne	6	1	1	0	2	77‡	4th‡
2026	Super GT - GT500	Kondo Racing	8	0	0	0	0	20	13th

‡ Team standings

=== Complete F4 Japanese Championship results ===
(key) (Races in bold indicate pole position; races in italics indicate points for the fastest lap of top ten finishers)

Year	Team	1	2	3	4	5	6	7	8	9	10	11	12	13	14	DC	Points
2017	Buzz International	OKA; 1	OKA; 2	FUJ1; 1	FUJ1; 2	AUT; 1	AUT; 2	SUG; 1	SUG; 2	FUJ2; 1; 9	FUJ2; 2; 8	SUZ; 1 Ret	SUZ; 2; 6	MOT; 1	MOT; 2	13th	14
2018	Honda Formula Dream Project	OKA; 1; 1	OKA; 2; 4	FUJ1; 1; 2	FUJ1; 2; 17	SUZ; 1; 3	SUZ; 2; 4	**FUJ2**; **1**; 3	**FUJ2**; **2**; 2	SUG; 1; 1	SUG; 2; 2	AUT; 1; 3	AUT; 2; 3	**MOT**; **1**; 2	**MOT**; **2**; 1	2nd	231

=== Complete Euroformula Open Championship results ===
(key) (Races in bold indicate pole position) (Races in italics indicate fastest lap)

Year	Team	1	2	3	4	5	6	7	8	9	10	11	12	13	14	15	16	17	18	Pos	Points
2019	Carlin Motorsport	LEC; 1; 6	LEC; 2; 8	PAU; 1 DNS	PAU; 2; 7	HOC; 1; 11	HOC; 2; 8	SPA; 1; 8	SPA; 2; 6	HUN; 1; 6	HUN; 2; 6	RBR; 1	RBR; 2	SIL; 1	SIL; 2	CAT; 1; 9	**CAT**; **2**; 1	MNZ; 1; 2	**MNZ**; **2**; 3	6th	115

=== Complete FIA Formula 3 Championship results ===
(key) (Races in bold indicate pole position; races in italics indicate points for the fastest lap of top ten finishers)

Year	Entrant	1	2	3	4	5	6	7	8	9	10	11	12	13	14	15	16	DC	Points
2019	Carlin Buzz Racing	CAT; FEA; 24	CAT; SPR; 15	LEC; FEA; Ret	LEC; SPR; Ret	RBR; FEA; Ret	RBR; SPR; 22	SIL; FEA; 25	SIL; SPR; 16	HUN; FEA; 20	HUN; SPR; Ret	SPA; FEA; 11	SPA; SPR; 8	MNZ; FEA; 11	MNZ; SPR; 29†	SOC; FEA; 20	SOC; SPR; 19	24th	1

^{†} Driver did not finish the race, but was classified as he completed over 90% of the race distance.

=== Complete Super Formula Lights results ===
(key) (Races in bold indicate pole position) (Races in italics indicate fastest lap)

Year	Entrant	1	2	3	4	5	6	7	8	9	10	11	12	13	14	15	16	17	18	Pos	Points
2020	Toda Racing	MOT; 1; 3	MOT; 2; 7	MOT; 3; 5	OKA; 1; 4	OKA; 2; 4	SUG; 1 Ret	SUG; 2; 3	SUG; 3; 5	AUT; 1; 3	AUT; 2; 2	AUT; 3; 3	SUZ; 1; 5	SUZ; 2; 3	SUZ; 3; 5	FUJ; 1; 4	FUJ; 2; 4	FUJ; 3; 4		4th	54
2021	B-Max Racing	**FUJ**; **1**; 1	**FUJ**; **2**; 2	FUJ; 3; 2	**SUZ**; **1**; 1	**SUZ**; **2**; 1	SUZ; 3; 1	AUT; 1; 5	AUT; 2; 1	AUT; 3 C	SUG; 1; 2	**SUG**; **2**; 1	SUG; 3; 2	MOT1; 1; 2	MOT1; 2; 4	MOT1; 3; 7	**MOT2**; **1**; 4	MOT2; 2; 10	MOT2; 3; 8	1st	109

=== Complete Super Formula results ===
(key) (Races in bold indicate pole position) (Races in italics indicate fastest lap)

Year	Team	Engine	1	2	3	4	5	6	7	DC	Points
2020	Buzz Racing with B-Max	Honda	MOT; DNS	OKA	SUG	AUT	SUZ	SUZ	FUJ	NC	0

=== Complete Super GT results ===
(key) (Races in bold indicate pole position; races in italics indicate fastest lap)

Year	Team	Car	Class	1	2	3	4	5	6	7	8	9	DC	Points
2021	Team UpGarage	Honda NSX GT3 Evo	GT300	OKA; 11	FUJ; 9	MOT; 10	SUZ; DNS	SUG; 12	AUT; 16	**MOT**; Ret	FUJ; Ret		25th	4
2022	Tomei Sports	Nissan GT-R NISMO GT3	GT300	OKA	FUJ	SUZ	FUJ	SUZ	SUG	AUT	MOT; 10		36th	1
2023	Kondo Racing	Nissan GT-R NISMO GT3	GT300	OKA; 10	**FUJ**; 1	SUZ; 4	FUJ; 4	SUZ; Ret	SUG; 10	AUT; 5	MOT; 6		3rd	50
2024	Kondo Racing	Nissan Z NISMO GT500	GT500	OKA; 12	FUJ; 13	SUZ; 9	FUJ; 14	SUG; 13	**AUT**; 12†	MOT; 8	SUZ; 15		14th	8
2025	Kondo Racing	Nissan Z NISMO GT500	GT500	OKA; 11†	FUJ; 15	SEP; Ret	FS1 (12)	FS2; 10	SUZ; 13	SUG; 1	AUT; Ret	MOT; 10	14th	21.5
2026	Kondo Racing	Nissan Z NISMO GT500	GT500	OKA; 9	FUJ; 6	FUJ; 11	SUZ; 7	SUG; 7	AUT; 11	MOT; 9	MOT; 8		13th	20

^{†} Driver did not finish, but was classified as he completed over 90% of the race distance. ^{(Number)} Driver did not take part in this sprint race, points are still awarded for the teammate's result.

Sporting positions
Preceded by Ritomo Miyata	Super Formula Lights; Champion; 2021	Succeeded by Kazuto Kotaka
