= Naoya Gamou =

Japanese racing driver

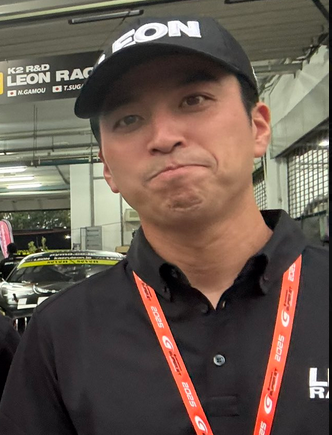
- Gamou at the 2025 Super GT Malaysia Festival
- Nationality: (Japan) Japanese
- Born: 11 November 1989 (age 36) Kurashiki, Okayama, Japan

Super GT career
- Debut season: 2011
- Current team: K2 R&D LEON Racing
- Categorisation: FIA Gold
- Car number: 65
- Former teams: Hankook KTR, Okinawa-IMP Racing with SHIFT
- Starts: 92
- Wins: 8
- Podiums: 18
- Poles: 4
- Fastest laps: 7
- Best finish: 1st in 2018, 2025

Previous series
- 2010–12 2009: Japanese Formula 3 Championship; Formula Challenge Japan

Championship titles
- 2025 2023 2020 2018 2017: Super GT - GT300; Super Taikyū - ST-X; Super Taikyū - ST-1; Super GT - GT300; Super Taikyū - ST-4

Naoya Gamou (蒲生尚弥, Gamō Naoya; born 11 November 1989) is a Japanese professional racing driver who currently competes in Super GT for K2 R&D LEON Racing in the GT300 class. He has won the Super GT championship twice, in 2018 and 2025, in the GT300 class.

== History ==
=== Formula career ===
Gamou started his formula career in 2008, as he competed in Formula Challenge Japan

Gamou then competed in Japanese Formula 3 Championship in 2010 in the national class as the TDP Toyota Junior driver, where he finished runner-up behind Takashi Kobayashi. Gamou then promoted to the championship class with TOM'S., as he finished fourth in the standings. He made a one off appearance with KCMG for 2012.

=== GT racing ===
Gamou started his GT300 career in 2011 with Hankook KTR for two rounds. He then made a one off appearance in 2013 with Okinawa-IMP Racing with SHIFT. Gamou then made another one appearance in 2014 with LEON Racing, as the next year he promoted to be the team's full-time driver. Gamou raced with K2 R&D LEON Racing brand team since 2014, and in 2018 where he won his first title with Haruki Kurosawa. Then he won in 2025 with Togo Suganami.

== Racing record ==
=== Career summary ===
Season	Series	Team	Races	Wins	Poles	FLaps	Podiums	Points	Position
2009	Formula Challenge Japan	FTRS FCJ	10	3	3	0	7	36	**3rd**
2009	Super Taikyū - ST2	T'Z Racing Varis	2	0	0	0	0	0	NC
2010	Japanese Formula 3 Championship - National	TOM'S Spirit	16	8	7	5	12	121	**2nd**
2011	Japanese Formula 3 Championship	Petronas Team TOM'S	14	1	0	1	10	71	4th
2011	Super GT - GT300	Hankook KTR	2	0	0	0	0	0	NC
2012	Japanese Formula 3 Championship - National	SGC by KCMG	2	0	0	0	0	7	7th
2012	Super Taikyū - ST-4	GAZOO Racing Spirit	2	0	0	0	1	16‡	10th‡
2013	Super GT - GT300	Okinawa-IMP Racing with SHIFT	1	0	0	0	1	18	16th
2013	Super Taikyū - ST-4	GAZOO Racing Spirit	4	1	0	0	1	49.5‡	6th‡
2013	24 Hours of Nürburgring - SP3	Toyota Gazoo Racing	1	0	0	0	0	N/A	NC
2014	Super GT - GT300	LEON Racing	1	0	0	0	0	5	29th
2014	Super Taikyū - ST-4	GAZOO Racing Spirit	5	1	0	0	3	61.5‡	4th‡
2014	24 Hours of Nürburgring - SP3	Toyota Gazoo Racing	1	1	1	1	1	N/A	**1st**
2015	Super GT - GT300	LEON Racing	8	0	0	1	1	41	9th
2015	Super Taikyū - ST-4	Toyota Team TOM'S Spirit						55.5‡	6th‡
2015	24 Hours of Nürburgring - SP3T	Team Toyota Gazoo Racing	1	0	0	0	0	N/A	4th
2016	Super GT - GT300	K2 R&D LEON Racing	8	1	0	0	1	26	12th
2016	Super Taikyū - ST-4	Toyota Team TOM'S Spirit						96‡	**2nd‡**
2016	24 Hours of Nürburgring - SP3T	Toyota Gazoo Racing	1	0	0	0	0	N/A	NC
2017	Super GT - GT300	K2 R&D LEON Racing	8	2	1	3	3	72	**2nd**
2017	Super Taikyū - ST-4	TOM'S Spirit	6	5	4	3	6	135‡	**1st‡**
2018	Super GT - GT300	K2 R&D LEON Racing	8	1	1	0	1	68	**1st**
2018	Super Taikyū - ST-4	TOM'S Spirit	1	0	1	0	0	159‡	**1st‡**
2019	Super GT - GT300	K2 R&D LEON Racing	8	0	0	0	2	46.5	5th
2019	Super Taikyū - ST-4	Endless Sports						89‡	4th‡
2020	Super GT - GT300	K2 R&D LEON Racing	8	1	0	0	2	59	**3rd**
2020	Super Taikyū - ST-1	ROOKIE Racing	4	4	4	4	4	121‡	**1st‡**
2021	Super GT - GT300	K2 R&D LEON Racing	8	0	0	0	2	43	6th
2021	Super Taikyū - ST-Q	ROOKIE Racing						N/A	NC
2022	Super GT - GT300	K2 R&D LEON Racing	8	0	1	1	2	33	9th
2022	Super Taikyū - ST-Q	ORC ROOKIE Racing						N/A	NC
2023	Super GT - GT300	K2 R&D LEON Racing	8	0	1	1	2	44	4th
2023	Super Taikyū - ST-X	Zhongsheng ROOKIE Racing	7	3	2	1	5	136‡	**1st‡**
2023	TGR GR86/BRZ Cup	Netz Hyōgo Racing Team	7	0	0	0	1	21	11th
2024	Super GT - GT300	K2 R&D LEON Racing	8	2	2	1	4	92	**2nd**
2024	Super Taikyu - ST-X	Zhongsheng ROOKIE Racing	7	3	1	0	4	134.4‡	**1st‡**
2024	TGR GR86/BRZ Cup	Netz Hyōgo Racing Team	6	0	0	0	1	45	7th
2025	Super GT - GT300	K2 R&D LEON Racing	8	1	0	1	2	86	**1st**
2025	GT World Challenge Asia	Porsche Centre Okazaki	1	0	0	0	0	2	44th
2025	Super Taikyu - ST-X	apr	6	1	1	0	3	114‡	**3rd‡**
2025	Nürburgring Langstrecken-Serie - SP8T	TOYOTA GAZOO ROOKIE Racing							
2025	TGR GR86/BRZ Cup	Netz Hyōgo Racing Team	6	1	1	0	3	48	5th
2026	Super Taikyu - ST-X	apr							
2026	Super GT - GT300	K2 R&D LEON Racing							
2026	Nürburgring Langstrecken-Serie - SP9	KCMG							
2026	TGR GR86/BRZ Cup	Netz Hyōgo Racing Team							

‡ Team standings

=== Complete Super GT results ===
(key) (Races in bold indicate pole position) (Races in italics indicate fastest lap)

Year	Team	Car	Class	1	2	3	4	5	6	7	8	9	DC	Pts
2011	Hankook KTR	Porsche 911 GT3 RSR	GT300	OKA	FSW; 10	SEP	SUG	SUZ; Ret	FSW	AUT	TRM		NC	0
2013	Okinawa-IMP Racing with SHIFT	Mercedes-Benz SLS AMG GT3	GT300	OKA	FSW	SEP	SUG	SUZ; 2	FSW	AUT	TRM		16th	18
2014	LEON Racing	Mercedes-Benz SLS AMG GT3	GT300	OKA	FSW	AUT	SUG	FSW	SUZ	CHA	TRM; 6		29th	5
2015	LEON Racing	Mercedes-Benz SLS AMG GT3	GT300	OKA; 22	FSW; 7	CHA; 5	FSW; 2	SUZ; 6	SUG; 7	AUT; 12	TRM; 5		9th	41
2016	K2 R&D LEON Racing	Mercedes-AMG GT3	GT300	OKA; 1	FSW; Ret	SUG; 16	FSW; 23	SUZ; 8	CHA; 11	TRM; 9	TRM; 24		12th	26
2017	K2 R&D LEON Racing	Mercedes-AMG GT3	GT300	**OKA**; 2	FSW; 5	AUT; 10	SUG; 7	FSW; 13	SUZ; 1	CHA; 13	TRM; 1		**2nd**	**72**
2018	K2 R&D LEON Racing	Mercedes-AMG GT3	GT300	OKA; 4	FSW; 4	SUZ; 7	**CHA**; 4	FSW; 4	SUG; 8	AUT; 5	TRM; 1		**1st**	**68**
2019	K2 R&D LEON Racing	Mercedes-AMG GT3	GT300	OKA; 6	FSW; 5	SUZ; 14	CHA; 3	FSW; Ret	AUT; 7	SUG; 4	TRM; 2		5th	46.5
2020	K2 R&D LEON Racing	Mercedes-AMG GT3 Evo	GT300	FSW; 6	FSW; 4	SUZ; 6	TRM; 1	FSW; 3	SUZ; 10	TRM; 19	FSW; 4		**3rd**	**59**
2021	K2 R&D LEON Racing	Mercedes-AMG GT3 Evo	GT300	OKA; 2	FSW; 4	SUZ; 9	TRM; 15	SUG; 14	AUT; 8	TRM; Ret	FSW; 2		6th	43
2022	K2 R&D LEON Racing	Mercedes-AMG GT3 Evo	GT300	OKA; 3	FUJ; 15	SUZ; 13	**FUJ**; Ret	SUZ; 6	SUG; 6	AUT; 3	MOT; 18		9th	33
2023	K2 R&D LEON Racing	Mercedes-AMG GT3 Evo	GT300	**OKA**; 2	FUJ; 4	SUZ; 12	FUJ; 25	SUZ; Ret	SUG; 6	AUT; 12	MOT; 2		4th	44
2024	K2 R&D LEON Racing	Mercedes-AMG GT3 Evo	GT300	**OKA**; **2^{1}**	FUJ; 26	SUZ; 8	**FUJ**; **1^{1}**	SUG; 1	AUT; 6	MOT; 2	SUZ; 4		2nd	92
2025	K2 R&D LEON Racing	Mercedes-AMG GT3 Evo	GT300	OKA; 1	FUJ; 5	SEP; 7	FS1; 3	FS2 (3)	SUZ; 13	SUG; 11	AUT; 6	MOT; 6	1st	86
2026	K2 R&D LEON Racing	Mercedes-AMG GT3 Evo	GT300	OKA; 5	FUJ; 2	FUJ; 10	SUZ; 17	SUG; 16	AUT; 3	MOT; 13	MOT; 7		5th	65

^{*} Season still in progress.
