= 2017 Super Taikyu Series =

Japanese endurance car racing series

The 2017 Super Taikyu Series was the 26th season of the Super Taikyu Series. The season started on 1 April at Twin Ring Motegi and ended on 15 October at Okayama International Circuit.

== Teams and drivers ==
=== ST–X ===
Team	Car	No.	Drivers	Rounds
(Japan) Kondō Racing	Nissan GT-R Nismo GT3	1	(Japan) Tomonobu Fujii	All
(Japan) Kondō Racing	Nissan GT-R Nismo GT3	1	(Japan) Kazuki Hiramine	All
(Japan) Kondō Racing	Nissan GT-R Nismo GT3	1	(Japan) Yudai Uchida	All
(Japan) Endless Sports	Nissan GT-R Nismo GT3	3	(Japan) Yuya Motojima	All
(Japan) Endless Sports	Nissan GT-R Nismo GT3	3	(Japan) Yukinori Taniguchi	All
(Japan) Endless Sports	Nissan GT-R Nismo GT3	3	(Japan) Hideki Yamauchi	All
(Japan) ARN RACING	Ferrari 488 GT3	8	(Japan) Hiroaki Nagai	All
(Japan) ARN RACING	Ferrari 488 GT3	8	(Japan) Kota Sasaki	All
(Japan) ARN RACING	Ferrari 488 GT3	8	(Japan) Yuki Shiraishi	3
(Japan) ARN RACING	Ferrari 488 GT3	8	(Japan) Tsubasa Mekaru	5
(Japan) K's Frontier	Porsche 997 GT3-R	25	(Japan) Taiyō Iida	1–2, 5–6
(Japan) K's Frontier	Porsche 997 GT3-R	25	(Japan) Tetsuo Ogino	1–2, 5–6
(Japan) K's Frontier	Porsche 997 GT3-R	25	(Japan) Shinichi Takagi	1
(Japan) K's Frontier	Porsche 997 GT3-R	25	(Japan) Tomoki Nojiri	2, 5–6
(Chinese Taipei) HubAuto Racing	Ferrari 488 GT3	89	(Chinese Taipei) Morris Chen	1–5
(Chinese Taipei) HubAuto Racing	Ferrari 488 GT3	89	(Japan) Yuya Sakamoto	1–5
(Chinese Taipei) HubAuto Racing	Ferrari 488 GT3	89	(Japan) Hiroki Yoshimoto	1–4
(Chinese Taipei) HubAuto Racing	Ferrari 488 GT3	89	(Japan) Daiki Yoshimoto	5
(Chinese Taipei) HubAuto Racing	Ferrari 488 GT3	89	(Japan) Shunsuke Kohno	5
(Japan) GTNET MOTOR SPORTS	Nissan GT-R Nismo GT3	99	(Japan) Kiyoto Fujinami	All
(Japan) GTNET MOTOR SPORTS	Nissan GT-R Nismo GT3	99	(Japan) Kazuki Hoshino	All
(Japan) GTNET MOTOR SPORTS	Nissan GT-R Nismo GT3	99	(Japan) Tadao Uematsu	All
(Japan) Rn-sports	Mercedes-Benz SLS AMG GT3	112	(Japan) Nobuo Kubo	3–6
(Japan) Rn-sports	Mercedes-Benz SLS AMG GT3	112	(Japan) Atsushi Sato	3–6
(Japan) Rn-sports	Mercedes-Benz SLS AMG GT3	112	(Japan) Ryōsei Yamashita	3–6
(Japan) Rn-sports	Mercedes-Benz SLS AMG GT3	112	(Japan) Masayuki Ueda	5
(Japan) D'Station Racing	Porsche 911 GT3 R	777	(Japan) Seiji Ara	All
(Japan) D'Station Racing	Porsche 911 GT3 R	777	(Japan) Satoshi Hoshino	All
(Japan) D'Station Racing	Porsche 911 GT3 R	777	(Japan) Tsubasa Kondo	All
(Japan) CarGuy Racing	Lamborghini Huracán GT3	999	(Japan) Takeshi Kimura	3–6
(Japan) CarGuy Racing	Lamborghini Huracán GT3	999	(Malaysia) Afiq Yazid	3–6
(Japan) CarGuy Racing	Lamborghini Huracán GT3	999	(Japan) Naoki Yokomizo	3–5
(Japan) CarGuy Racing	Lamborghini Huracán GT3	999	(Italy) Kei Cozzolino	5–6

=== ST–TCR ===
Team	Car	No.	Drivers	Rounds
(Japan) Adenau	Volkswagen Golf GTI TCR	10	(France) Philippe Devesa	3, 5–6
(Japan) Adenau	Volkswagen Golf GTI TCR	10	(Japan) Shōgo Mitsuyama	3, 5–6
(Japan) Adenau	Volkswagen Golf GTI TCR	10	(Japan) Toshikazu Wakisaka	5
(Japan) Birth Racing Project	Audi RS 3 LMS TCR	19	(Japan) Kei Akiyoshi	All
(Japan) Birth Racing Project	Audi RS 3 LMS TCR	19	(Japan) Kōichi Okumura	All
(Japan) Birth Racing Project	Audi RS 3 LMS TCR	19	(Japan) Yūsaku Shibata	2
(Japan) Birth Racing Project	Audi RS 3 LMS TCR	19	(Japan) Yoshimitsu Ueno	4–5
(Japan) Birth Racing Project	Audi RS 3 LMS TCR	19	(Japan) Daisuke Yamawaki	1, 3, 5–6
(Japan) Audi Team DreamDrive	Audi RS 3 LMS TCR	45	(Japan) Takuya Shirakasa	All
(Japan) Audi Team DreamDrive	Audi RS 3 LMS TCR	45	(Japan) Shōzo Tagahara	All
(Japan) Audi Team DreamDrive	Audi RS 3 LMS TCR	45	(Japan) Naoto Takeda	All
(Japan) Audi Team DreamDrive	Audi RS 3 LMS TCR	45	(Japan) Toshihiro Arai	5
(Japan) Modulo Racing Project	Honda Civic Type-R TCR	97	(Japan) Shinichi Ebisawa	1–4
(Japan) Modulo Racing Project	Honda Civic Type-R TCR	97	(Japan) Shinichi Ito	All
(Japan) Modulo Racing Project	Honda Civic Type-R TCR	97	(Japan) Shinji Nakano	All
(Japan) Modulo Racing Project	Honda Civic Type-R TCR	97	(Japan) Hidenori Konai	5–6
(Japan) Modulo Racing Project	Honda Civic Type-R TCR	97	(Japan) Ryō Michigami	5
(Japan) MOTUL DOME RACING PROJECT	Honda Civic Type-R TCR	98	(Japan) Keishi Ishikawa	All
(Japan) MOTUL DOME RACING PROJECT	Honda Civic Type-R TCR	98	(Japan) Hiroki Kato	All
(Japan) MOTUL DOME RACING PROJECT	Honda Civic Type-R TCR	98	(Japan) Takuya Kurosawa	All
(Japan) MOTUL DOME RACING PROJECT	Honda Civic Type-R TCR	98	(Japan) Hiroki Yoshida	5

=== ST–1 ===
Team	Car	No.	Drivers	Rounds
(Japan) apr	Porsche 911 GT3 Cup	31	(Japan) Masami Kageyama	All
(Japan) apr	Porsche 911 GT3 Cup	31	(Japan) Katsuhito Ogawa	All
(Japan) apr	Porsche 911 GT3 Cup	31	(Japan) Ryūichirō Tomita	All
(Japan) BEND	BMW Z4M Coupe	51	(Japan) Shinya Hosokawa	1, 5
(Japan) BEND	BMW Z4M Coupe	51	(Japan) Daisuke Ikeda	1, 5
(Japan) BEND	BMW Z4M Coupe	51	(Japan) Masamitsu Ishihara	1, 5
(Japan) BEND	BMW Z4M Coupe	51	(Japan) Atsushi Yogō	5

=== ST–2 ===
Team	Car	No.	Drivers	Rounds
(Japan) Shinryo Racing Team	Mitsubishi Lancer Evolution X	6	(Japan) Yasushi Kikuchi	All
(Japan) Shinryo Racing Team	Mitsubishi Lancer Evolution X	6	(Japan) Masazumi Ohashi	All
(Japan) Shinryo Racing Team	Mitsubishi Lancer Evolution X	6	(Japan) Tomohiro Tomimasu	All
(Japan) Shinryo Racing Team	Mitsubishi Lancer Evolution X	7	(Japan) Atsushi Ishizaki	All
(Japan) Shinryo Racing Team	Mitsubishi Lancer Evolution X	7	(Japan) Masato Narisawa	All
(Japan) Shinryo Racing Team	Mitsubishi Lancer Evolution X	7	(Japan) Soichiro Yoshida	All
(Japan) Shinryo Racing Team	Mitsubishi Lancer Evolution X	7	(Japan) Genki Nishimura	5
(Japan) RS OGAWA	Mitsubishi Lancer Evolution X	20	(Japan) Sesshū Kondō	All
(Japan) RS OGAWA	Mitsubishi Lancer Evolution X	20	(Japan) Takeshi Matsumoto	All
(Japan) RS OGAWA	Mitsubishi Lancer Evolution X	20	(Japan) Kazuya Shimogaki	All
(Japan) RS OGAWA	Mitsubishi Lancer Evolution X	20	(Japan) Junji Ueda	5
(Japan) RS OGAWA	Mitsubishi Lancer Evolution IX	30	(Japan) Katsuichi Ito	1–3
(Japan) RS OGAWA	Mitsubishi Lancer Evolution IX	30	(Japan) Hajime Oami	1–3
(Japan) RS OGAWA	Mitsubishi Lancer Evolution IX	30	(Japan) Shinya Sato	1–3
(Japan) TOWAINTEC Racing	Subaru WRX STi	59	(Japan) Hitoshi Goto	All
(Japan) TOWAINTEC Racing	Subaru WRX STi	59	(Japan) Manabu Osawa	All
(Japan) TOWAINTEC Racing	Subaru WRX STi	59	(Japan) Nobuteru Taniguchi	5

=== ST–3 ===
Team	Car	No.	Drivers	Rounds
(Japan) OKABEJIDOSHA motorsport	Nissan Fairlady Z (Z34)	14	(Japan) Yasuhiro Arai	All
(Japan) OKABEJIDOSHA motorsport	Nissan Fairlady Z (Z34)	14	(Japan) Toshiaki Koshimizu	All
(Japan) OKABEJIDOSHA motorsport	Nissan Fairlady Z (Z34)	14	(Japan) Manabu Yamazaki	All
(Japan) OKABEJIDOSHA motorsport	Nissan Fairlady Z (Z34)	14	(Japan) Yoshinobu Masuda	5
(Japan) OKABEJIDOSHA motorsport	Nissan Fairlady Z (Z34)	15	(Japan) Masaaki Nagashima	All
(Japan) OKABEJIDOSHA motorsport	Nissan Fairlady Z (Z34)	15	(Japan) Tetsuya Tanaka	All
(Japan) OKABEJIDOSHA motorsport	Nissan Fairlady Z (Z34)	15	(Japan) Toru Tanaka	All
(Japan) OKABEJIDOSHA motorsport	Nissan Fairlady Z (Z34)	15	(Japan) Kazumi Komatsu	5
(Japan) OKABEJIDOSHA motorsport	Nissan Fairlady Z (Z34)	23	(Japan) Mitsunori Atake	All
(Japan) OKABEJIDOSHA motorsport	Nissan Fairlady Z (Z34)	23	(Japan) Masaya Kōno	All
(Japan) OKABEJIDOSHA motorsport	Nissan Fairlady Z (Z34)	23	(Japan) Manabu Oohara	All
(Japan) OKABEJIDOSHA motorsport	Nissan Fairlady Z (Z34)	23	(Japan) Takahiko Shimazawa	5
(Japan) Team Nopro	Mazda Axela Diesel Turbo	17	(Japan) Tatsuya Nogami	All
(Japan) Team Nopro	Mazda Axela Diesel Turbo	17	(Japan) Toshihiko Nogami	All
(Japan) Team Nopro	Mazda Axela Diesel Turbo	17	(Japan) Tatsuya Tanigawa	All
(Japan) Team Nopro	Mazda Axela Diesel Turbo	17	(Japan) Hiroki Yamada	5
(Japan) TECHNO FIRST	Nissan Fairlady Z	34	(Japan) Satoshi Matsubara	All
(Japan) TECHNO FIRST	Nissan Fairlady Z	34	(Japan) Satoshi Motoyama	All
(Japan) TECHNO FIRST	Nissan Fairlady Z	34	(Japan) Hironobu Yasuda	All
(Japan) TECHNO FIRST	Nissan Fairlady Z	34	(Japan) Masaki Kano	5
(Japan) Tracy Sports	Lexus IS350	38	(Japan) Makoto Hotta	All
(Japan) Tracy Sports	Lexus IS350	38	(Japan) Ryōhei Sakaguchi	All
(Japan) Tracy Sports	Lexus IS350	38	(Japan) Morio Nitta	5
(Japan) Tracy Sports	Lexus RC350	39	(Japan) Syuji Maejima	All
(Japan) Tracy Sports	Lexus RC350	39	(Japan) Yūya Tezuka	All
(Japan) Tracy Sports	Lexus RC350	39	(Japan) Akira Suzuki	All
(Japan) Tracy Sports	Lexus RC350	39	(Japan) Taketoshi Matsui	5
(Japan) Le Beausset Motorsports	Lexus RC350	62	(Japan) Yūya Hiraki	1, 5
(Japan) Le Beausset Motorsports	Lexus RC350	62	(Japan) Yuichi Nakayama	All
(Japan) Le Beausset Motorsports	Lexus RC350	62	(Japan) Koki Saga	All
(Japan) Le Beausset Motorsports	Lexus RC350	62	(Japan) Kenta Yamashita	2–6
(Japan) Saitama Toyopet GreenBrave	Toyota Mark X	68	(Japan) Naoki Hattori	All
(Japan) Saitama Toyopet GreenBrave	Toyota Mark X	68	(Japan) Takayuki Hiranuma	All
(Japan) Saitama Toyopet GreenBrave	Toyota Mark X	68	(Japan) Shigekazu Wakisaka	All
(Japan) NDS Racing Section	Nissan Fairlady Z (Z33)	118	(Japan) Yosunari Fujiwara	4
(Japan) NDS Racing Section	Nissan Fairlady Z (Z33)	118	(Japan) Yuji Kiitaki	4
(Japan) NDS Racing Section	Nissan Fairlady Z (Z33)	118	(Japan) Toshirō Tsukada	4

=== ST–4 ===
Team	Car	No.	Drivers	Rounds
(Japan) RIKU	Honda Civic Type-R	12	(Japan) Hayato Date	1–2, 5–6
(Japan) RIKU	Honda Civic Type-R	12	(Japan) "Riku"	1–2, 5–6
(Japan) RIKU	Honda Civic Type-R	12	(Japan) Takayuki Matsui	1–2, 5–6
(Japan) RIKU	Honda Civic Type-R	12	(Japan) Shigekazu Namiki	5
(Japan) Endless Sports	Toyota 86	13	(Japan) Masaya Hanazato	All
(Japan) Endless Sports	Toyota 86	13	(Japan) Ryō Ogawa	All
(Japan) Endless Sports	Toyota 86	13	(Japan) Tsubasa Takahashi	All
(Japan) Asano Racing Service	Toyota 86	18	(Japan) Takeo Asano	All
(Japan) Asano Racing Service	Toyota 86	18	(Japan) Masataka Inoue	All
(Japan) Asano Racing Service	Toyota 86	18	(Japan) Kazunori Nishimura	1, 5
(Japan) Asano Racing Service	Toyota 86	18	(Japan) Daiji Yamada	2, 4
(Japan) Asano Racing Service	Toyota 86	18	(Japan) Teruyuki Kasahara	5
(Japan) Asano Racing Service	Toyota 86	18	(Japan) Shukukazu Shiba	6
(Japan) Tarmac Pro Racing Team	Toyota Vitz GRMN Turbo	26	(Japan) Kazuhiko Kawanago	1–5
(Japan) Tarmac Pro Racing Team	Toyota Vitz GRMN Turbo	26	(Japan) Mitsuaki Matsuo	All
(Japan) Tarmac Pro Racing Team	Toyota Vitz GRMN Turbo	26	(Japan) Tobio Ohtani	All
(Japan) Makiguchi Technique	Subaru BRZ	27	(Japan) Masaki Baba	All
(Japan) Makiguchi Technique	Subaru BRZ	27	(Japan) Isao Ihashi	All
(Japan) Makiguchi Technique	Subaru BRZ	27	(Japan) Takahiro Muraji	All
(Japan) T's Concept	Toyota 86	28	(Japan) Tohjiro Azuma	6
(Japan) T's Concept	Toyota 86	28	(Japan) Masayuki Ueda	6
(Japan) T's Concept	Toyota 86	28	(Japan) Tetsuya Moriyama	6
(Japan) T's Concept	Toyota 86	29	(Japan) Tohjiro Azuma	1–5
(Japan) T's Concept	Toyota 86	29	(Japan) Daisuke Matsunaga	1–5
(Japan) T's Concept	Toyota 86	29	(Japan) Tetsuya Moriyama	1, 5
(Japan) T's Concept	Toyota 86	29	(Japan) Yasuhiro Ogura	2–3, 5–6
(Japan) T's Concept	Toyota 86	29	(Japan) Yuji Takahashi	6
(Japan) T's Concept	Toyota 86	29	(Japan) Miki Koyama	6
(Japan) TRACYSPORTS	Toyota 86	40	(Japan) Ryuju Fujita	All
(Japan) TRACYSPORTS	Toyota 86	40	(Japan) Teruhiko Hamano	All
(Japan) TRACYSPORTS	Toyota 86	40	(Japan) Akiya Yoshimoto	All
(Japan) TRACYSPORTS	Toyota 86	40	(Japan) Yukihiko Yamamoto	5
(Japan) TC CORSE	Mazda Roadster	54	(Japan) Teruaki Kato	All
(Japan) TC CORSE	Mazda Roadster	54	(Japan) Yuui Tsutsumi	All
(Japan) AUTOFACTORY	Toyota 86	55	(Japan) Takashi Ito	All
(Japan) AUTOFACTORY	Toyota 86	55	(Japan) Masayuki Tanaka	All
(Japan) AUTOFACTORY	Toyota 86	55	(Japan) Jun Tashiro	All
(Japan) G-motion with KRP	Honda Integra Type-R	58	(Japan) Kōichi Kobayashi	6
(Japan) G-motion with KRP	Honda Integra Type-R	58	(Japan) Retsushu Shioya	6
(Japan) G-motion with KRP	Honda Integra Type-R	58	(Japan) Sakiko Tsuji	6
(Japan) G-motion with KRP	Honda Integra Type-R	60	(Japan) Kazuyuki Matsumoto	1–3, 5–6
(Japan) G-motion with KRP	Honda Integra Type-R	60	(Japan) Takahiro Matsuzawa	1–3, 5–6
(Japan) G-motion with KRP	Honda Integra Type-R	60	(Japan) Hajime Suzuki	1–3, 6
(Japan) G-motion with KRP	Honda Integra Type-R	60	(Japan) Toshirō Tsukada	5
(Japan) G-motion with KRP	Honda Integra Type-R	60	(China) Su Wuxi	5
(Japan) amuse & SPV Racing	Toyota 86	74	(Japan) Ryūta Uketa	5–6
(Japan) amuse & SPV Racing	Toyota 86	74	(Malaysia) Kenny Lee	5
(Japan) amuse & SPV Racing	Toyota 86	74	(Japan) Tetsuya Hibino	6
(Japan) amuse & SPV Racing	Toyota 86	74	(Japan) Hitoshi Matsui	6
(Japan) amuse & SPV Racing	Toyota 86	100	(Japan) Hachiro Osaka	1–4
(Japan) amuse & SPV Racing	Toyota 86	100	(Japan) Takashi Shibuya	All
(Japan) amuse & SPV Racing	Toyota 86	100	(Japan) Tadashi Watanabe	All
(Japan) amuse & SPV Racing	Toyota 86	100	(Japan) Nanami Tsukamoto	6
(Japan) CUSCO RACING	Toyota 86	77	(Japan) Kōji Endō	All
(Japan) CUSCO RACING	Toyota 86	77	(Japan) Yasunori Nakajima	All
(Japan) CUSCO RACING	Toyota 86	77	(Japan) Eiji Yamada	All
(Japan) TOM'S Spirit	Toyota 86	86	(Japan) Naoya Gamou	All
(Japan) TOM'S Spirit	Toyota 86	86	(Japan) Takamitsu Matsui	All
(Japan) TOM'S Spirit	Toyota 86	86	(Japan) Takuto Iguchi	1, 5
(Japan) TOM'S Spirit	Toyota 86	86	(Japan) Sho Tsuboi	2–6
(Japan) SKR ENGINEERING	Honda S2000	93	(Japan) Yuya Ohta	All
(Japan) SKR ENGINEERING	Honda S2000	93	(Japan) Masahiro Sasaki	All
(Japan) SKR ENGINEERING	Honda S2000	93	(Japan) Yūsaku Shibata	5
(Japan) ASTMIL Racing	Honda Integra Type-R	96	(Japan) Keiichi Inoue	1
(Japan) ASTMIL Racing	Honda Integra Type-R	96	(Japan) Yuki Nemoto	1
(Japan) W.S. ENGINEERING	Honda S2000	116	(Japan) Yasuhiro Ogushi	4, 6
(Japan) W.S. ENGINEERING	Honda S2000	116	(Japan) Tetsuya Shuto	4, 6
(Japan) W.S. ENGINEERING	Honda S2000	116	(Japan) Yoshida Yasuyuki	4, 6
(Japan) Yukari Yukari Racing	Honda Integra Type-R	220	(Japan) Yoshiyuki Tsuruga	6
(Japan) Yukari Yukari Racing	Honda Integra Type-R	220	(Japan) Takahiro Watanabe	6
(Japan) Yukari Yukari Racing	Honda Integra Type-R	220	(Japan) Kōsuke Watari	6
(Japan) GLORYRACING with A-ONE	Honda Civic Type-R Euro	333	(Japan) Kizuku Hirota	1, 3, 5–6
(Japan) GLORYRACING with A-ONE	Honda Civic Type-R Euro	333	(Japan) Yuya Nakajima	1, 3, 5–6
(Japan) GLORYRACING with A-ONE	Honda Civic Type-R Euro	333	(Japan) Kazuhisa Shimoyama	1, 3, 5
(Japan) GLORYRACING with A-ONE	Honda Civic Type-R Euro	333	(Japan) Inouchi Tomohiro	5

=== ST–5 ===
Team	Car	No.	Drivers	Rounds
(Japan) TEAM221 BOMEX with Auto Laboratory ND5RC	Mazda Roadster	2	(Japan) Katsuhiko Tsutsui	1–5
(Japan) TEAM221 BOMEX with Auto Laboratory ND5RC	Mazda Roadster	2	(Japan) Junichirou Yamashita	1–5
(Japan) TEAM221 BOMEX with Auto Laboratory ND5RC	Mazda Roadster	2	(Japan) Kōji Yamanishi	1–4
(Japan) TEAM221 BOMEX with Auto Laboratory ND5RC	Mazda Roadster	2	(Japan) Yamanishi Yasuji	5
(Japan) TEAM221 BOMEX with Auto Laboratory ND5RC	Mazda Roadster	2	(Japan) Takahiro Tanaka	5
(Japan) TEAM BRIDE	Honda Fit 3 RS	4	(Japan) Seijiro Aihara	2
(Japan) TEAM BRIDE	Honda Fit 3 RS	4	(Japan) Karurosu Honda	4, 6
(Japan) TEAM BRIDE	Honda Fit 3 RS	4	(Japan) Toshiya Ito	1, 3, 5
(Japan) TEAM BRIDE	Honda Fit 3 RS	4	(Japan) Susumu Nakamura	All
(Japan) TEAM BRIDE	Honda Fit 3 RS	4	(Japan) Junzo Shibatani	All
(Japan) TEAM BRIDE	Honda Fit 3 RS	4	(Japan) Kurosu Souichi	5
(Japan) Team Blood Sports	Toyota Vitz RS	11	(Japan) Takahiro Miki	All
(Japan) Team Blood Sports	Toyota Vitz RS	11	(Japan) Takao Ohnishi	All
(Japan) Team Blood Sports	Toyota Vitz RS	11	(Japan) Hiroyuki Itagaki	2
(Japan) Team Blood Sports	Toyota Vitz RS	11	(Japan) Koki Oiwa	1, 4–5
(Japan) Team Blood Sports	Toyota Vitz RS	11	(Japan) Kazuya Ōshima (Note: Born 10 June 1997; not to be confused with Kazuya Oshima.)	5
(Japan) Team Blood Sports	Toyota Vitz RS	11	(Japan) Masashi Tojo	3, 6
(Japan) apr	Mazda Roadster	32	(Japan) Akihiro Harashima	1–2, 5–6
(Japan) apr	Mazda Roadster	32	(Japan) Akie Iinuma	1–2, 5
(Japan) apr	Mazda Roadster	32	(Japan) Tatsuya Okahara	1–2, 5
(Japan) apr	Mazda Roadster	32	(Japan) Naoya Kawashima	6
(Japan) apr	Mazda Roadster	32	(Japan) Junko Takahashi	6
(Japan) apr	Mazda Roadster	32	(Japan) Hideki Kobayashi	5
(Japan) TEAM NOPRO	Mazda Demio Diesel Turbo	37	(Japan) Kaoru Ijiri	All
(Japan) TEAM NOPRO	Mazda Demio Diesel Turbo	37	(Japan) Yutaka Seki	All
(Japan) TEAM NOPRO	Mazda Demio Diesel Turbo	37	(Japan) Go Umeda	All
(Japan) Dijon Racing	Honda Fit 3 RS	48	(Japan) Genki Nishimura	1–4
(Japan) Dijon Racing	Honda Fit 3 RS	48	(Japan) Zene Okazaki	All
(Japan) Dijon Racing	Honda Fit 3 RS	48	(Japan) Dr.Takamori	All
(Japan) Dijon Racing	Honda Fit 3 RS	48	(Japan) Keiichi Inoue	5–6
(Japan) LOVE DRIVE RACING	Mazda Roadster	50	(Japan) Marie Iwaoka	All
(Japan) LOVE DRIVE RACING	Mazda Roadster	50	(Japan) Enami Kitahira	1–3
(Japan) LOVE DRIVE RACING	Mazda Roadster	50	(Japan) Hiroko Komatsu	1, 3–6
(Japan) LOVE DRIVE RACING	Mazda Roadster	50	(Japan) Eriko Yamamoto	2
(Japan) LOVE DRIVE RACING	Mazda Roadster	50	(Japan) Anna Innaumi	5–6
(Japan) LOVE DRIVE RACING	Mazda Roadster	50	(Japan) Yumiko Sekasaki	5
(Japan) M&K Management Co., Ltd.	Honda Fit 3 RS	57	(Japan) Mitsuhiro Endo	All
(Japan) M&K Management Co., Ltd.	Honda Fit 3 RS	57	(Japan) Ryusuke Masumoto	All
(Japan) M&K Management Co., Ltd.	Honda Fit 3 RS	57	(Japan) Kenta Harada	1–3, 5–6
(Japan) M&K Management Co., Ltd.	Honda Fit 3 RS	57	(Japan) Yasunori Matsumoto	4
(Japan) M&K Management Co., Ltd.	Honda Fit 3 RS	57	(Japan) Shinichi Morimoto	5
(Japan) OVER DRIVE	Mazda Demio	66	(Japan) Ric Hashimoto	All
(Japan) OVER DRIVE	Mazda Demio	66	(Japan) Ryuichiro Ohtsuka	All
(Japan) OVER DRIVE	Mazda Demio	66	(Japan) Takayuki Takechi	All
(Japan) OVER DRIVE	Mazda Demio	66	(Japan) Nishiyama Takashi	5
(Japan) TEAM YAMATO	Honda Fit 3 RS	67	(Japan) Ryō Nakagawa	6
(Japan) TEAM YAMATO	Honda Fit 3 RS	67	(Japan) Ryōhei Yasui	6
(Japan) J'S RACING	Honda Fit 3 RS	69	(Japan) Takahisa Ohno	All
(Japan) J'S RACING	Honda Fit 3 RS	69	(Japan) Junichi Umemoto	All
(Japan) J'S RACING	Honda Fit 3 RS	69	(Japan) Hideaki Yamada	1–4
(Japan) J'S RACING	Honda Fit 3 RS	69	(Japan) Hirokazu Takahashi	5
(Japan) J'S RACING	Honda Fit 3 RS	69	(Japan) Tomomitsu Senoo	5–6
(Japan) J'S RACING	Honda Fit 3 RS	700	(Japan) "Hirobon"	All
(Japan) J'S RACING	Honda Fit 3 RS	700	(Japan) Seiji Imuta	2, 3–6
(Japan) J'S RACING	Honda Fit 3 RS	700	(Japan) Yusuke Ohga	2, 5
(Japan) J'S RACING	Honda Fit 3 RS	700	(Japan) Hirokazu Takahashi	1
(Japan) J'S RACING	Honda Fit 3 RS	700	(Japan) Leo Teranishi	1, 3–6
(Japan) Murakami Motors	Mazda Roadster	88	(Japan) Hiroyuki Murakami	All
(Japan) Murakami Motors	Mazda Roadster	88	(Japan) Takeshi Wakitani	All
(Japan) Murakami Motors	Mazda Roadster	88	(Japan) Masato Kato	4–6
(Japan) Murakami Motors	Mazda Roadster	88	(Japan) Keiji Amemiya	5
(Japan) Apurosu Racing	Toyota Vitz RS	213	(Japan) Takashi Azuma	All
(Japan) Apurosu Racing	Toyota Vitz RS	213	(Japan) Futoshi Omeya	1–4
(Japan) Apurosu Racing	Toyota Vitz RS	213	(Japan) Yuichi Yokoo	1, 3, 5–6

== Calendar and results ==
Rnd.	Class	Circuit	Date	Pole Position	Fastest Lap	Winners
1	ST–X	Twin Ring Motegi, Motegi	1-2 April	(Japan) No. 8 ARN RACING	(Japan) No. 1 Kondō Racing	(Japan) No. 1 Kondō Racing
1	ST–X	Twin Ring Motegi, Motegi	1-2 April	(Japan) Hiroaki Nagai (Japan) Kota Sasaki	(Japan) Tomonobu Fujii (Japan) Kazuki Hiramine (Japan) Yudai Uchida	(Japan) Tomonobu Fujii (Japan) Kazuki Hiramine (Japan) Yudai Uchida
1	ST–TCR	Twin Ring Motegi, Motegi	1-2 April	(Japan) No. 45 Audi Team DreamDrive	(Japan) No. 98 MOTUL DOME RACING PROJECT	(Japan) No. 98 MOTUL DOME RACING PROJECT
1	ST–TCR	Twin Ring Motegi, Motegi	1-2 April	(Japan) Takuya Shirakasa (Japan) Shozo Tagahara (Japan) Naoto Takeda	(Japan) Keishi Ishikawa (Japan) Hiroki Kato (Japan) Takuya Kurosawa	(Japan) Keishi Ishikawa (Japan) Hiroki Kato (Japan) Takuya Kurosawa
1	ST–1	Twin Ring Motegi, Motegi	1-2 April	(Japan) No. 31 apr	(Japan) No. 31 apr	(Japan) No. 51 BEND
1	ST–1	Twin Ring Motegi, Motegi	1-2 April	(Japan) Masami Kageyama (Japan) Katsuhito Ogawa (Japan) Ryūichirō Tomita	(Japan) Masami Kageyama (Japan) Katsuhito Ogawa (Japan) Ryūichirō Tomita	(Japan) Shinya Hosokawa (Japan) Daisuke Ikeda (Japan) Masamitsu Ishihara
1	ST–2	Twin Ring Motegi, Motegi	1-2 April	(Japan) No. 59 TOWAINTEC Racing	(Japan) No. 59 TOWAINTEC Racing	(Japan) No. 20 RS OGAWA
1	ST–2	Twin Ring Motegi, Motegi	1-2 April	(Japan) Hitoshi Goto (Japan) Manabu Osawa	(Japan) Hitoshi Goto (Japan) Manabu Osawa	(Japan) Sesshū Kondō (Japan) Takeshi Matsumoto (Japan) Kazuya Shimogaki
1	ST–3	Twin Ring Motegi, Motegi	1-2 April	(Japan) No. 38 TRACYSPORTS	(Japan) No. 38 TRACYSPORTS	(Japan) No. 38 TRACYSPORTS
1	ST–3	Twin Ring Motegi, Motegi	1-2 April	(Japan) Makoto Hotta (Japan) Ryōhei Sakaguchi	(Japan) Makoto Hotta (Japan) Ryōhei Sakaguchi	(Japan) Makoto Hotta (Japan) Ryōhei Sakaguchi
1	ST–4	Twin Ring Motegi, Motegi	1-2 April	(Japan) No. 93 SKR ENGINEERING	(Japan) No. 93 SKR ENGINEERING	(Japan) No. 93 SKR ENGINEERING
1	ST–4	Twin Ring Motegi, Motegi	1-2 April	(Japan) Yuya Ohta (Japan) Masahiro Sasaki	(Japan) Yuya Ohta (Japan) Masahiro Sasaki	(Japan) Yuya Ohta (Japan) Masahiro Sasaki
1	ST–5	Twin Ring Motegi, Motegi	1-2 April	(Japan) No. 700 J'S RACING	(Japan) No. 48 Dijon Racing	(Japan) No. 700 J'S RACING
1	ST–5	Twin Ring Motegi, Motegi	1-2 April	(Japan) "Hirobon" (Japan) Hirokazu Takahashi (Japan) Leo Teranishi	(Japan) Genki Nishimura (Japan) Zene Okazaki (Japan) Dr.Takamori	(Japan) "Hirobon" (Japan) Hirokazu Takahashi (Japan) Leo Teranishi
2	ST–X	Sportsland SUGO, Murata	29-30 April	(Japan) No. 8 ARN RACING	(Japan) No. 3 ENDLESS SPORTS	(Japan) No. 1 Kondō Racing
2	ST–X	Sportsland SUGO, Murata	29-30 April	(Japan) Hiroaki Nagai (Japan) Kota Sasaki	(Japan) Yūya Motojima (Japan) Yukinori Taniguchi (Japan) Hideki Yamauchi	(Japan) Tomonobu Fujii (Japan) Kazuki Hiramine (Japan) Yudai Uchida
2	ST–TCR	Sportsland SUGO, Murata	29-30 April	(Japan) No. 45 Audi Team DreamDrive	(Japan) No. 98 MOTUL DOME RACING PROJECT	(Japan) No. 97 Modulo Racing Project
2	ST–TCR	Sportsland SUGO, Murata	29-30 April	(Japan) Takuya Shirakasa (Japan) Shozo Tagahara (Japan) Naoto Takeda	(Japan) Keishi Ishikawa (Japan) Hiroki Kato (Japan) Takuya Kurosawa	(Japan) Shinichi Ebisawa (Japan) Shinichi Ito (Japan) Shinji Nakano
2	ST–1	Sportsland SUGO, Murata	29-30 April	(Japan) No. 31 apr	(Japan) No. 31 apr	(Japan) No. 31 apr
2	ST–1	Sportsland SUGO, Murata	29-30 April	(Japan) Masami Kageyama (Japan) Katsuhito Ogawa (Japan) Ryūichirō Tomita	(Japan) Masami Kageyama (Japan) Katsuhito Ogawa (Japan) Ryuichiro Tomita	(Japan) Masami Kageyama (Japan) Katsuhito Ogawa (Japan) Ryūichirō Tomita
2	ST–2	Sportsland SUGO, Murata	29-30 April	(Japan) No. 59 TOWAINTEC Racing	(Japan) No. 59 TOWAINTEC Racing	(Japan) No. 59 TOWAINTEC Racing
2	ST–2	Sportsland SUGO, Murata	29-30 April	(Japan) Hitoshi Goto (Japan) Manabu Osawa	(Japan) Hitoshi Goto (Japan) Manabu Osawa	(Japan) Hitoshi Goto (Japan) Manabu Osawa
2	ST–3	Sportsland SUGO, Murata	29-30 April	(Japan) No. 62 Le Beausset Motorsports	(Japan) No. 38 TRACYSPORTS	(Japan) No. 15 OKABEJIDOSHA motorsport
2	ST–3	Sportsland SUGO, Murata	29-30 April	(Japan) Yuichi Nakayama (Japan) Koki Saga (Japan) Kenta Yamashita	(Japan) Makoto Hotta (Japan) Ryōhei Sakaguchi	(Japan) Masaaki Nagashima (Japan) Tetsuya Tanaka (Japan) Toru Tanaka
2	ST–4	Sportsland SUGO, Murata	29-30 April	(Japan) No. 86 TOM'S SPIRIT	(Japan) No. 86 TOM'S SPIRIT	(Japan) No. 86 TOM'S SPIRIT
2	ST–4	Sportsland SUGO, Murata	29-30 April	(Japan) Naoya Gamou (Japan) Takamitsu Matsui (Japan) Sho Tsuboi	(Japan) Naoya Gamou (Japan) Takamitsu Matsui (Japan) Sho Tsuboi	(Japan) Naoya Gamou (Japan) Takamitsu Matsui (Japan) Sho Tsuboi
2	ST–5	Sportsland SUGO, Murata	29-30 April	(Japan) No. 88 Murakami Motors	(Japan) No. 2 TEAM221 BOMEX with Auto Laboratory ND5RC	(Japan) No. 88 Murakami Motors
2	ST–5	Sportsland SUGO, Murata	29-30 April	(Japan) Hiroyuki Murakami (Japan) Takeshi Wakitani	(Japan) Katsuhiko Tsutsui (Japan) Koji Yamanishi (Japan) Junichirou Yamashita	(Japan) Hiroyuki Murakami (Japan) Takeshi Wakitani
3	ST–X	Suzuka Circuit, Suzuka City	10-11 June	(Japan) No. 8 ARN RACING	(Japan) No. 8 ARN RACING	(Japan) No. 99 GTNET MOTOR SPORTS
3	ST–X	Suzuka Circuit, Suzuka City	10-11 June	(Japan) Hiroaki Nagai (Japan) Kota Sasaki	(Japan) Hiroaki Nagai (Japan) Kota Sasaki	(Japan) Kiyoto Fujinami (Japan) Kazuki Hoshino (Japan) Tadao Uematsu
3	ST–TCR	Suzuka Circuit, Suzuka City	10-11 June	(Japan) No. 45 Audi Team DreamDrive	(Japan) No. 45 Audi Team DreamDrive	(Japan) No. 98 MOTUL DOME RACING PROJECT
3	ST–TCR	Suzuka Circuit, Suzuka City	10-11 June	(Japan) Takuya Shirakasa (Japan) Shozo Tagahara (Japan) Naoto Takeda	(Japan) Takuya Shirakasa (Japan) Shozo Tagahara (Japan) Naoto Takeda	(Japan) Keishi Ishikawa (Japan) Hiroki Kato (Japan) Takuya Kurosawa
3	ST–1	Suzuka Circuit, Suzuka City	10-11 June	(Japan) No. 31 apr	(Japan) No. 31 apr	(Japan) No. 31 apr
3	ST–1	Suzuka Circuit, Suzuka City	10-11 June	(Japan) Masami Kageyama (Japan) Katsuhito Ogawa (Japan) Ryūichirō Tomita	(Japan) Masami Kageyama (Japan) Katsuhito Ogawa (Japan) Ryūichirō Tomita	(Japan) Masami Kageyama (Japan) Katsuhito Ogawa (Japan) Ryūichirō Tomita
3	ST–2	Suzuka Circuit, Suzuka City	10-11 June	(Japan) No. 6 Shinryo Racing Team	(Japan) No. 20 RS OGAWA	(Japan) No. 59 TOWAINTEC Racing
3	ST–2	Suzuka Circuit, Suzuka City	10-11 June	(Japan) Yasushi Kikuchi (Japan) Masazumi Ohashi (Japan) Tomohiro Tomimasu	(Japan) Sesshū Kondō (Japan) Takeshi Matsumoto (Japan) Kazuya Shimogaki	(Japan) Hitoshi Goto (Japan) Manabu Osawa
3	ST–3	Suzuka Circuit, Suzuka City	10-11 June	(Japan) No. 62 Le Beausset Motorsports	(Japan) No. 38 TRACYSPORTS	(Japan) No. 62 Le Beausset Motorsports
3	ST–3	Suzuka Circuit, Suzuka City	10-11 June	(Japan) Yuichi Nakayama (Japan) Koki Saga (Japan) Kenta Yamashita	(Japan) Makoto Hotta (Japan) Ryōhei Sakaguchi	(Japan) Yuichi Nakayama (Japan) Koki Saga (Japan) Kenta Yamashita
3	ST–4	Suzuka Circuit, Suzuka City	10-11 June	(Japan) No. 86 TOM'S SPIRIT	(Japan) No. 55 AUTOFACTORY	(Japan) No. 86 TOM'S SPIRIT
3	ST–4	Suzuka Circuit, Suzuka City	10-11 June	(Japan) Naoya Gamou (Japan) Takamitsu Matsui (Japan) Sho Tsuboi	(Japan) Takashi Ito (Japan) Masayuki Tanaka (Japan) Jun Tashiro	(Japan) Naoya Gamou (Japan) Takamitsu Matsui (Japan) Sho Tsuboi
3	ST–5	Suzuka Circuit, Suzuka City	10-11 June	(Japan) No. 88 Murakami Motors	(Japan) No. 4 TEAM BRIDE	(Japan) No. 88 Murakami Motors
3	ST–5	Suzuka Circuit, Suzuka City	10-11 June	(Japan) Hiroyuki Murakami (Japan) Takeshi Wakitani	(Japan) Toshiya Ito (Japan) Susumu Nakamura (Japan) Junzo Shibatani	(Japan) Hiroyuki Murakami (Japan) Takeshi Wakitani
4	ST–X	Autopolis, Kamitsue	15–16 July	(Japan) No. 8 ARN RACING	(Taiwan) No. 89 HubAuto Racing	(Japan) No. 8 ARN RACING
4	ST–X	Autopolis, Kamitsue	15–16 July	(Japan) Hiroaki Nagai (Japan) Kota Sasaki	(Taiwan) Morris Chen (Japan) Yuya Sakamoto (Japan) Hiroki Yoshimoto	(Japan) Hiroaki Nagai (Japan) Kota Sasaki
4	ST–TCR	Autopolis, Kamitsue	15–16 July	(Japan) No. 45 Audi Team DreamDrive	(Japan) No. 98 MOTUL DOME RACING PROJECT	(Japan) No. 98 MOTUL DOME RACING PROJECT
4	ST–TCR	Autopolis, Kamitsue	15–16 July	(Japan) Takuya Shirakasa (Japan) Shozo Tagahara (Japan) Naoto Takeda	(Japan) Keishi Ishikawa (Japan) Hiroki Kato (Japan) Takuya Kurosawa	(Japan) Keishi Ishikawa (Japan) Hiroki Kato (Japan) Takuya Kurosawa
4	ST–1	Autopolis, Kamitsue	15–16 July	(Japan) No. 31 apr	(Japan) No. 31 apr	(Japan) No. 31 apr
4	ST–1	Autopolis, Kamitsue	15–16 July	(Japan) Masami Kageyama (Japan) Katsuhito Ogawa (Japan) Ryūichirō Tomita	(Japan) Masami Kageyama (Japan) Katsuhito Ogawa (Japan) Ryūichirō Tomita	(Japan) Masami Kageyama (Japan) Katsuhito Ogawa (Japan) Ryūichirō Tomita
4	ST–2	Autopolis, Kamitsue	15–16 July	(Japan) No. 59 TOWAINTEC Racing	(Japan) No. 59 TOWAINTEC Racing	(Japan) No. 6 Shinryo Racing Team
4	ST–2	Autopolis, Kamitsue	15–16 July	(Japan) Hitoshi Goto (Japan) Manabu Osawa	(Japan) Hitoshi Goto (Japan) Manabu Osawa	(Japan) Yasushi Kikuchi (Japan) Masazumi Ohashi (Japan) Tomohiro Tomimasu
4	ST–3	Autopolis, Kamitsue	15–16 July	(Japan) No. 39 TRACYSPORTS	(Japan) No.15 OKABEJIDOSHA motorsport	(Japan) No. 39 TRACYSPORTS
4	ST–3	Autopolis, Kamitsue	15–16 July	(Japan) Syuji Maejima (Japan) Yuya Tezuka (Japan) Akira Suzuki	(Japan) Masaaki Nagashima (Japan) Tetsuya Tanaka (Japan) Toru Tanaka	(Japan) Syuji Maejima (Japan) Yuya Tezuka (Japan) Akira Suzuki
4	ST–4	Autopolis, Kamitsue	15–16 July	(Japan) No. 86 TOM'S SPIRIT	(Japan) No. 86 TOM'S SPIRIT	(Japan) No. 86 TOM'S SPIRIT
4	ST–4	Autopolis, Kamitsue	15–16 July	(Japan) Naoya Gamou (Japan) Takamitsu Matsui (Japan) Sho Tsuboi	(Japan) Naoya Gamou (Japan) Takamitsu Matsui (Japan) Sho Tsuboi	(Japan) Naoya Gamou (Japan) Takamitsu Matsui (Japan) Sho Tsuboi
4	ST–5	Autopolis, Kamitsue	15–16 July	(Japan) No. 88 Murakami Motors	(Japan) No. 2 TEAM221 BOMEX with Auto Laboratory ND5RC	(Japan) No. 88 Murakami Motors
4	ST–5	Autopolis, Kamitsue	15–16 July	(Japan) Hiroyuki Murakami (Japan) Takeshi Wakitani (Japan) Masato Kato	(Japan) Katsuhiko Tsutsui (Japan) Koji Yamanishi (Japan) Junichirou Yamashita	(Japan) Hiroyuki Murakami (Japan) Takeshi Wakitani (Japan) Masato Kato
5	ST–X	Fuji Speedway, Oyama	2-3 September	(Japan) No. 8 ARN RACING	(Japan) No. 8 ARN RACING	(Japan) No. 8 ARN RACING
5	ST–X	Fuji Speedway, Oyama	2-3 September	(Japan) Hiroaki Nagai (Japan) Kota Sasaki	(Japan) Hiroaki Nagai (Japan) Kota Sasaki	(Japan) Hiroaki Nagai (Japan) Kota Sasaki
5	ST–TCR	Fuji Speedway, Oyama	2-3 September	(Japan) No. 10 Adenau	(Japan) No. 10 Adenau	(Japan) No. 10 Adenau
5	ST–TCR	Fuji Speedway, Oyama	2-3 September	(France) Philippe Devesa (Japan) Shogo Mitsuyama	(France) Philippe Devesa (Japan) Shogo Mitsuyama	(France) Philippe Devesa (Japan) Shogo Mitsuyama
5	ST–1	Fuji Speedway, Oyama	2-3 September	(Japan) No. 31 apr	(Japan) No. 31 apr	(Japan) No. 31 apr
5	ST–1	Fuji Speedway, Oyama	2-3 September	(Japan) Masami Kageyama (Japan) Katsuhito Ogawa (Japan) Ryūichirō Tomita	(Japan) Masami Kageyama (Japan) Katsuhito Ogawa (Japan) Ryūichirō Tomita	(Japan) Masami Kageyama (Japan) Katsuhito Ogawa (Japan) Ryūichirō Tomita
5	ST–2	Fuji Speedway, Oyama	2-3 September	(Japan) No. 59 TOWAINTEC Racing	(Japan) No. 59 TOWAINTEC Racing	(Japan) No. 59 TOWAINTEC Racing
5	ST–2	Fuji Speedway, Oyama	2-3 September	(Japan) Hitoshi Goto (Japan) Manabu Osawa	(Japan) Hitoshi Goto (Japan) Manabu Osawa	(Japan) Hitoshi Goto (Japan) Manabu Osawa
5	ST–3	Fuji Speedway, Oyama	2-3 September	(Japan) No. 39 TRACYSPORTS	(Japan) No. 62 Le Beausset Motorsports	(Japan) No. 62 Le Beausset Motorsports
5	ST–3	Fuji Speedway, Oyama	2-3 September	(Japan) Syuji Maejima (Japan) Yuya Tezuka (Japan) Akira Suzuki	(Japan) Yuichi Nakayama (Japan) Koki Saga (Japan) Kenta Yamashita	(Japan) Yuichi Nakayama (Japan) Koki Saga (Japan) Kenta Yamashita
5	ST–4	Fuji Speedway, Oyama	2-3 September	(Japan) No. 93 SKR ENGINEERING	(Japan) No. 93 SKR ENGINEERING	(Japan) No. 86 TOM'S SPIRIT
5	ST–4	Fuji Speedway, Oyama	2-3 September	(Japan) Yuya Ohta (Japan) Masahiro Sasaki	(Japan) Yuya Ohta (Japan) Masahiro Sasaki	(Japan) Naoya Gamou (Japan) Takamitsu Matsui (Japan) Sho Tsuboi
5	ST–5	Fuji Speedway, Oyama	2-3 September	(Japan) No. 88 Murakami Motors	(Japan) No. 4 TEAM BRIDE	(Japan) No. 37 TEAM NOPRO
5	ST–5	Fuji Speedway, Oyama	2-3 September	(Japan) Hiroyuki Murakami (Japan) Takeshi Wakitani (Japan) Masato Kato	(Japan) Toshiya Ito (Japan) Susumu Nakamura (Japan) Junzo Shibatani	(Japan) Kaoru Ijiri (Japan) Yutaka Seki (Japan) Go Umeda
6	ST–X	Okayama International Circuit, Mimasaka	14-15 October	(Japan) No. 777 D'Station Racing	(Japan) No. 777 D'Station Racing	(Japan) No. 777 D'Station Racing
6	ST–X	Okayama International Circuit, Mimasaka	14-15 October	(Japan) Seiji Ara (Japan) Satoshi Hoshino (Japan) Tsubasa Kondō	(Japan) Seiji Ara (Japan) Satoshi Hoshino (Japan) Tsubasa Kondō	(Japan) Seiji Ara (Japan) Satoshi Hoshino (Japan) Tsubasa Kondō
6	ST–TCR	Okayama International Circuit, Mimasaka	14-15 October	(Japan) No. 97 Modulo Racing Project	(Japan) No. 97 Modulo Racing Project	(Japan) No. 97 Modulo Racing Project
6	ST–TCR	Okayama International Circuit, Mimasaka	14-15 October	(Japan) Shinichi Ito (Japan) Shinji Nakano (Japan) Hidenori Konai	(Japan) Shinichi Ito (Japan) Shinji Nakano (Japan) Hidenori Konai	(Japan) Shinichi Ito (Japan) Shinji Nakano (Japan) Hidenori Konai
6	ST–1	Okayama International Circuit, Mimasaka	14-15 October	(Japan) No. 31 apr	(Japan) No. 31 apr	(Japan) No. 31 apr
6	ST–1	Okayama International Circuit, Mimasaka	14-15 October	(Japan) Masami Kageyama (Japan) Katsuhito Ogawa (Japan) Ryūichirō Tomita	(Japan) Masami Kageyama (Japan) Katsuhito Ogawa (Japan) Ryūichirō Tomita	(Japan) Masami Kageyama (Japan) Katsuhito Ogawa (Japan) Ryūichirō Tomita
6	ST–2	Okayama International Circuit, Mimasaka	14-15 October	(Japan) No. 6 Shinryo Racing Team	(Japan) No. 6 Shinryo Racing Team	(Japan) No. 6 Shinryo Racing Team
6	ST–2	Okayama International Circuit, Mimasaka	14-15 October	(Japan) Yasushi Kikuchi (Japan) Masazumi Ohashi (Japan) Tomohiro Tomimasu	(Japan) Yasushi Kikuchi (Japan) Masazumi Ohashi (Japan) Tomohiro Tomimasu	(Japan) Yasushi Kikuchi (Japan) Masazumi Ohashi (Japan) Tomohiro Tomimasu
6	ST–3	Okayama International Circuit, Mimasaka	14-15 October	(Japan) No. 39 TRACYSPORTS	(Japan) No. 38 TRACYSPORTS	(Japan) No. 39 TRACYSPORTS
6	ST–3	Okayama International Circuit, Mimasaka	14-15 October	(Japan) Syuji Maejima (Japan) Yuya Tezuka (Japan) Akira Suzuki	(Japan) Makoto Hotta (Japan) Ryōhei Sakaguchi	(Japan) Syuji Maejima (Japan) Yuya Tezuka (Japan) Akira Suzuki
6	ST–4	Okayama International Circuit, Mimasaka	14-15 October	(Japan) No. 86 TOM'S SPIRIT	(Japan) No. 86 TOM'S SPIRIT	(Japan) No. 86 TOM'S SPIRIT
6	ST–4	Okayama International Circuit, Mimasaka	14-15 October	(Japan) Naoya Gamou (Japan) Takamitsu Matsui (Japan) Sho Tsuboi	(Japan) Naoya Gamou (Japan) Takamitsu Matsui (Japan) Sho Tsuboi	(Japan) Naoya Gamou (Japan) Takamitsu Matsui (Japan) Sho Tsuboi
6	ST–5	Okayama International Circuit, Mimasaka	14-15 October	(Japan) No. 4 TEAM BRIDE	(Japan) No. 4 TEAM BRIDE	(Japan) No. 37 TEAM NOPRO
6	ST–5	Okayama International Circuit, Mimasaka	14-15 October	(Japan) Karurosu Honda (Japan) Susumu Nakamura (Japan) Susumu Nakamura	(Japan) Karurosu Honda (Japan) Susumu Nakamura (Japan) Susumu Nakamura	(Japan) Kaoru Ijiri (Japan) Yutaka Seki (Japan) Go Umeda

== Championship standings ==
Pos.	Driver	MOT	SUG	SUZ	AUT	FUJ	OKA	Pts.
ST–X
1	(Japan) No. 8 ARN RACING	**5**	**3**	**3**	**1**	**1**	5	101
2	(Japan) No. 1 Kondō Racing	1	1	7†	6†	3	4	84
3	(Japan) No. 777 D'Station Racing	DNS	6	4	2	2	**1**	79.5
4	(Japan) No. 3 ENDLESS SPORTS	2	2	2	Ret	7†	2	71
5	(Japan) No. 99 GTNET MOTOR SPORTS	3	7†	1	4	8†	3	68.5
6	(Taiwan) No. 89 HubAuto Racing	4	4	5†	3	9†		48
7	(Japan) No. 25 K's Frontier	6	5			5	6	36
8	(Japan) No. 999 CARGUY RACING			6†	7†	4	8	32
9	(Japan) No. 112 Rn-sports			Ret	5	6	7	24
ST–TCR
1	(Japan) No. 98 MOTUL DOME RACING PROJECT	1	2	1	1	4†	5†	104
2	(Japan) No. 97 Modulo Racing Project	2	1	4	4	3†	**1**	100
3	(Japan) No. 19 Birth Racing Project	3	4	3	3	2	4	84.5
4	(Japan) No. 45 Audi Team DreamDrive	**4**	**3**	**2**	**2**	Ret	3	73
5	(Japan) No. 10 Adenau			5		**1**	2	57
ST–1
1	(Japan) No. 31 apr	**2**	**1**	**1**	**1**	**1**	**1**	137
2	(Japan) No. 51 BEND	1				2		44.5
ST–2
1	(Japan) No. 59 TOWAINTEC Racing	**2**	**1**	1	**3**	**1**	2	122
2	(Japan) No. 6 Shinryo Racing Team	Ret	Ret	**2**	1	2	**1**	83.5
3	(Japan) No. 7 Shinryo Racing Team	4	2	4	4†	3	4	79
4	(Japan) No. 20 RS OGAWA	1	Ret	3	2	Ret	3	63
5	(Japan) No. 30 RS OGAWA	3	Ret	5†				22
ST–3
1	(Japan) No. 39 TRACYSPORTS	2	4	4	**1**	**3**	**1**	102
2	(Japan) No. 62 Le Beausset Motorsports	5	**2**	**1**	2	1	DNS	95
3	(Japan) No. 68 Saitama Toyopet GreenBrave	3	7	2	3	2	3	83.5
4	(Japan) No. 38 TRACYSPORTS	**1**	5	3	5	6	2	79
5	(Japan) No. 15 OKABEJIDOSHA motorsport	4	1	Ret	4	4	4	70
6	(Japan) No. 23 OKABEJIDOSHA motorsport	7	6	6	6	5	6	46
7	(Japan) No. 34 TECHNO FIRST	6	3	5	7	Ret	5	43
8	(Japan) No. 14 OKABEJIDOSHA motorsport	8	8	7	8	8†	7	27.5
9	(Japan) No. 17 TEAM NOPRO	9†	Ret	DNS	9†	7†	8	17
10	(Japan) No. 118 NDS Racing Section				Ret			0
ST–4
1	(Japan) No. 86 TOM'S SPIRIT	2	**1**	**1**	**1**	1	**1**	135
2	(Japan) No. 13 ENDLESS SPORTS	3	2	3	2	2	3	94.5
3	(Japan) No. 93 SKR ENGINEERING	**1**	3	2	3	**4**	5	90
4	(Japan) No. 55 AUTOFACTORY	5	6	6	6	3	6	56
5	(Japan) No. 54 TC CORSE	6	Ret	5	4	11†	4	39
6	(Japan) No. 40 TRACYSPORTS	Ret	4	7	7	5	Ret	34
7	(Japan) No. 60 G-motion with KRP	9	11	4		6	7	30
8	(Japan) No. 27 Makiguchi Technique	4	Ret	Ret	5	7	12†	28
9	(Japan) No. 333 GLORYRACING with A-ONE	7		Ret		13†	2	22
10	(Japan) No. 29 T's Concept	8	9	9†	11	8	Ret	16.5
11	(Japan) No. 77 CUSCO RACING	11	5	Ret	8	Ret	Ret	14
12	(Japan) No. 18 Asano Racing Service	14†	7	DNS	9	12†	9	13
13	(Japan) No. 26 Tarmac Pro Racing Team	10	10	8	10	DNS	11	11
14	(Japan) No. 12 RIKU	12	8			9	Ret	9
15	(Japan) No. 100 amuse & SPV Racing	13	12	Ret	12	Ret	8	7
16	(Japan) No. 116 W.S. ENGINEERING				13		10	3
17	(Japan) No. 74 amuse & SPV Racing					10		2.5
—	(Japan) No. 96 ASTMIL Racing	Ret						0
–	(Japan) No. 29 T's Concept						Ret	0
–	(Japan) No. 58 G-motion with KRP						Ret	0
–	(Japan) No. 220 Yukari Yukari Racing						Ret	0
ST–5
1	(Japan) No. 88 Murakami Motors	3	**1**	**1**	**1**	**2**	8	107.5
2	(Japan) No. 37 TEAM NOPRO	5	4	DNS	3	1	1	85
3	(Japan) No. 700 J'S RACING	**1**	8	3	4	4	7	71
4	(Japan) No. 48 Dijon Racing	4	6	4	7	3	9	56
5	(Japan) No. 4 TEAM BRIDE	11	7	2	6	8†	**4**	46.5
6	(Japan) No. 2 TEAM221 BOMEX with Auto Laboratory ND5RC	7	3	6	2	9†		45
7	(Japan) No. 11 Team Blood Sports	2	9	7	9	6	6	44
8	(Japan) No. 66 OVER DRIVE	6	5	10	5	11†	2	44
9	(Japan) No. 57 M&K Management Co., Ltd.	9	2	8	8	10†	10	31.5
10	(Japan) No. 69 J'S RACING	10	Ret	5	10	7	5	29
11	(Japan) No. 32 apr	8	11			5	Ret	18
12	(Japan) No. 67 TEAM YAMATO						3	13
13	(Japan) No. 50 LOVE DRIVE RACING	Ret	Ret	9	Ret	13†	11	5
14	(Japan) No. 213 Apurosu Racing	12	10	DNS	11†	12†	Ret	4
Pos.	Driver	MOT	SUG	SUZ	AUT	FUJ	OKA	Pts.

Colour	Result
Gold	Winner
Silver	Second place
Bronze	Third place
Green	Points classification
Blue	Non-points classification
Blue	Non-classified finish (NC)
Purple	Retired, not classified (Ret)
Red	Did not qualify (DNQ)
Red	Did not pre-qualify (DNPQ)
Black	Disqualified (DSQ)
White	Did not start (DNS)
White	Withdrew (WD)
White	Race cancelled (C)
Blank	Did not practice (DNP)
Blank	Did not arrive (DNA)
Blank	Excluded (EX)

**Bold** – Pole
Italics – Fastest Lap

Notes:

- † – Drivers did not finish the race, but were classified as they completed over 75% of the race distance.
