= Apr (racing team) =

Japanese racing team

apr
- Founded: 2000
- Base: Atsugi, Kanagawa Prefecture
- Team principal(s): Hiroto Kaneso
- Current series: Super GT; Super Taikyu
- Current drivers: Super GT - GT300 (Car #30): (Japan) Hiroaki Nagai; (Japan) Hibiki Taira; (Japan) Manabu Orido; Super GT - GT300 (Car #31): (Japan) Kazuto Kotaka; (Japan) Miki Koyama; (Austria) Charlie Wurz; Super Taikyu ST-X: (Japan) Hiroaki Nagai; (Japan) Naoya Gamou; (Japan) Ryo Ogawa; (Japan) Koki Saga
- Teams' Championships: Super Taikyu ST-1: 2017
- Drivers' Championships: JGTC - GT300: 1999, 2002; Super GT - GT300: 2005, 2007; Super Taikyu ST-1: 2017
- Website: www.apr-racing.com

apr Co., Ltd. stylized as äpr, is a Japanese racing team competing in the GT300 class of Super GT as well as in Super Taikyu. The team also manufactures and sells parts for automobiles and motorcycles.

== History ==
Originally it was the racing division of Apex company, but as its business expanded, it became a fully independent corporation in 2000 and was rebranded as "apr".

=== Super GT ===
In 1998, the company began participating in the GT300 class of the JGTC (All Japan GT Championship) (Super GT from 2005) as a constructor with the Toyota MR2. After winning the championship in 1999, the following year, the company began developing cars with the support of TRD. In 2001, the company was also in charge of operations for ARTA's GT300 team. In 2003, the company was also responsible for the design and development of the ASL Garaiya GT300 car when the car participated in the race. The contract with ARTA ended at the end of the 2010 season. In 2012, the company entered the Toyota Prius, the first hybrid car in Super GT, and the Audi R8 LMS Ultra.

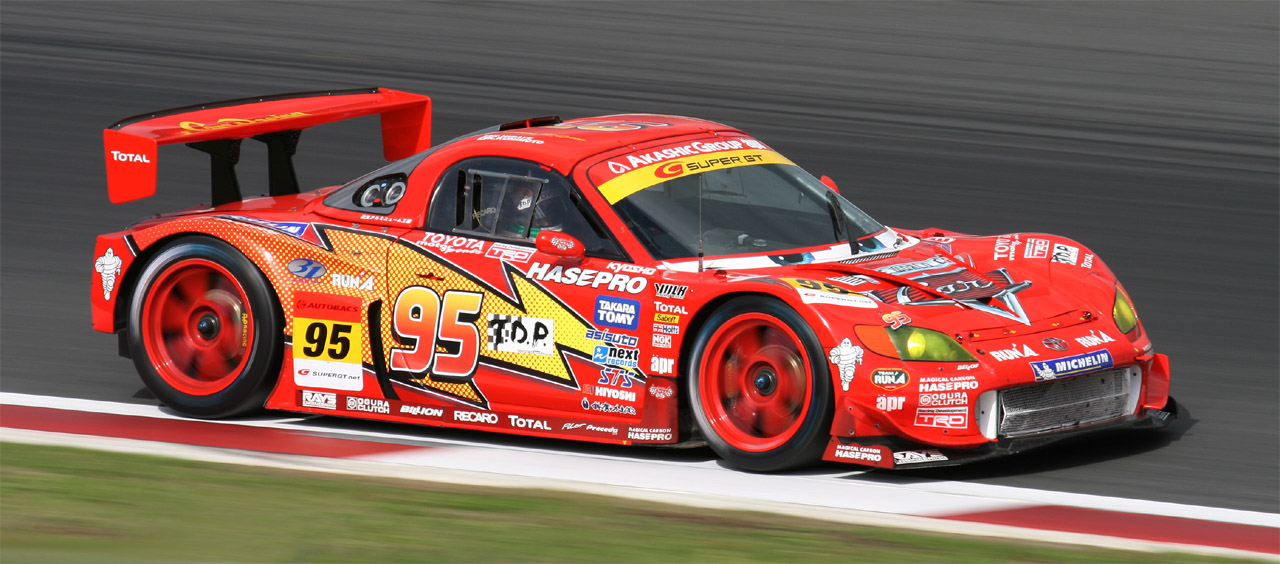
apr Toyota MR-S in the 2008 Super GT Series, driven by Kohei Hirate

Since 2000, it has been active in the GT300 class of JGTC to SUPER GT as a Toyota semi-works team. However, it is not entirely Toyota-focused, and operates other companies' machines in parallel as a privateer team. It won the championship in 1999, 2002, 2005, and 2007. A characteristic of the team is that it has used a large number of mid-ship engine cars in its history. Hiroto Kaneso, the first president and still the team's representative till now, once worked as an apprentice under Haruo Tsuchiya of Tsuchiya Engineering.

In 2013, the team competed with two cars, a Prius and an R8, until the third race, as in the previous year. However, since Bonds Racing took a break after only two races, the team took over the Nissan GT-R Nismo GT3, the team's vehicle, from the fourth race and competed until 2015. This GT-R was equipped with ADAS (Advanced Driver Assistance System) development equipment, with the special approval of the GTA, under the sponsor's wishes. In 2016, with the introduction of the new Prius, the team switched to a two-car Prius team. The No. 31 car had a conventional supercapacitor battery, while the No. 30 car had a lithium-ion battery. In 2019, due to changes in vehicle regulations, the base vehicle was changed to the Prius PHV GR SPORT, and the engine position was changed from midship to front. They are also using these engine components to develop the GR Supra and GR86 for use by other GT300 teams.

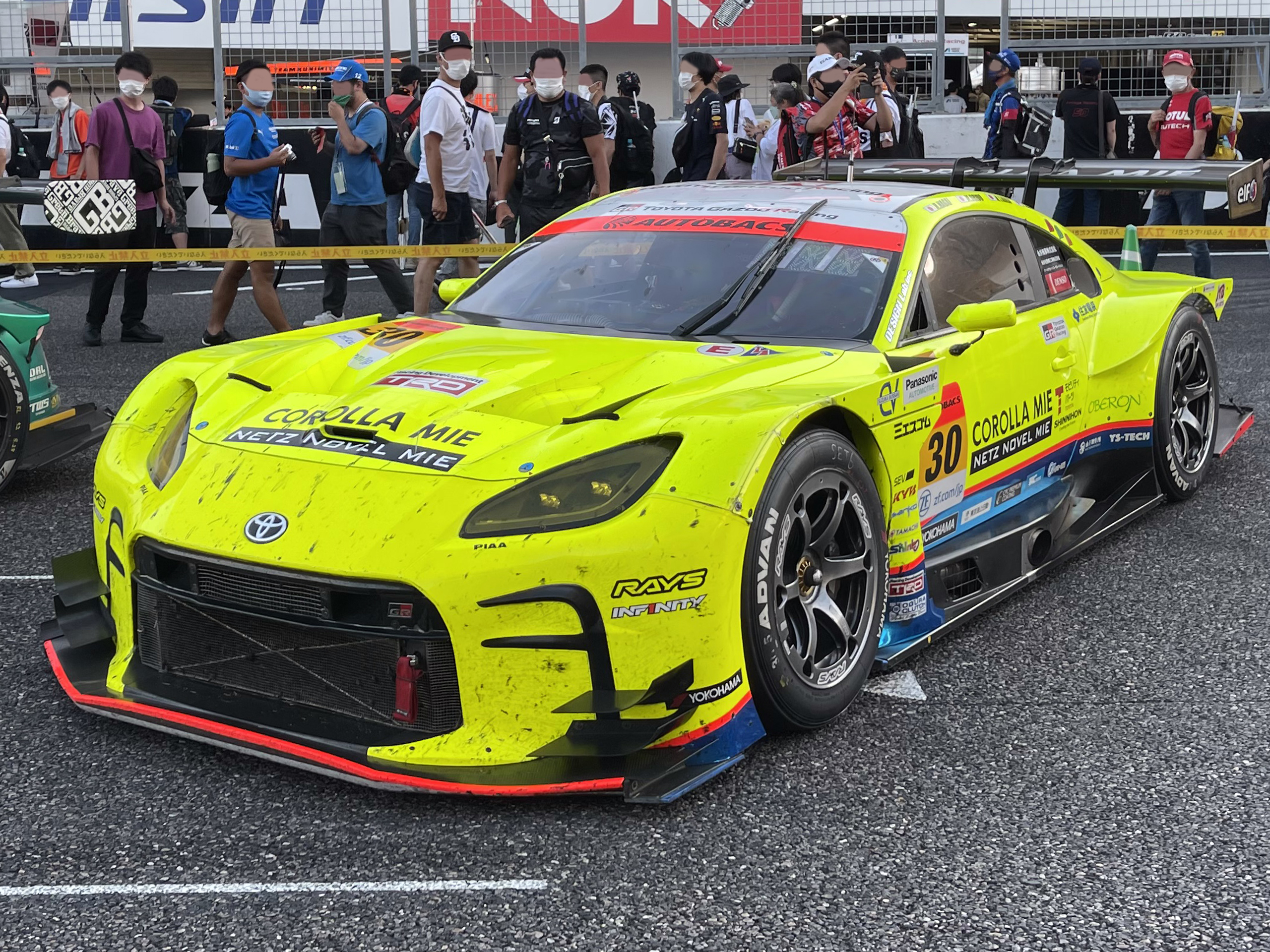
The No.30 GR86 GT raced by apr since 2021

In 2021, apr launched the Toyota GR86 GT, constructed to GT300 specifications and based on the second-generation Toyota 86 (ZN8) model. apr's number 30 team, INGING Motorsport and series newcomers SHADE Racing each field the car in 2022. apr replaced their Toyota GR Sport Prius PHV with a new hybrid GT300 car, the Lexus LC500h GT.

=== Super Taikyu ===
In 2020, they returned to Super Taikyu with a Lexus RC F GT3, and compete in the ST-X class.
