= Super Taikyu Series =

Auto racing championship in Japan

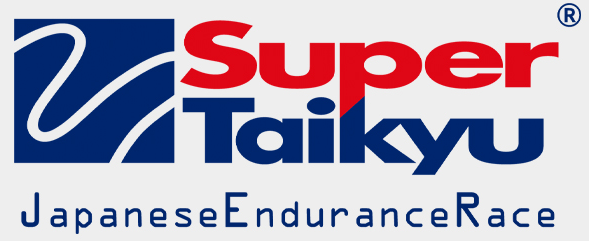
- Category: GT3, GT4, TCR, Group N
- Country: Japan
- Inaugural season: 1991
- Classes: ST-X, ST-Z, ST-TCR, ST-Q, ST-1, ST-2, ST-3, ST-4, ST-5
- Tyre suppliers: Bridgestone
- Official website: SuperTaikyu.com

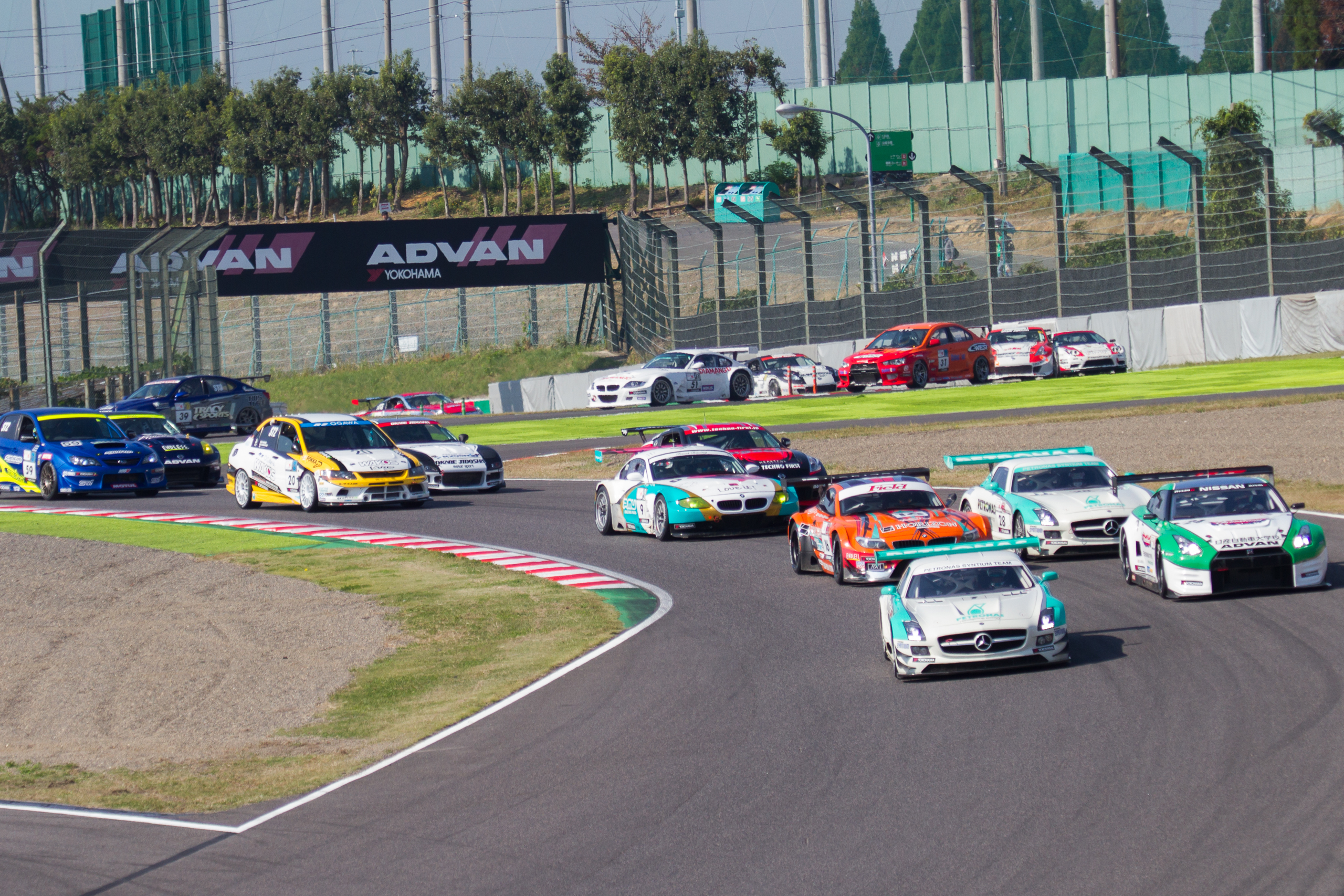
Formation lap of the 2012 Super Taikyu Suzuka 300km

Super Taikyu (スーパー耐久, Super Endurance), formerly known as the Super N1 Taikyu Series prior to 2005 and N1 Endurance Series prior to 1995, and currently named the Eneos Super Taikyu Series Empowered by Bridgestone for sponsorship reasons, is a Japanese endurance racing series that began in 1991. In contrast to the Super GT series, Super Taikyu is a pro-am racing series for commercially available racing vehicles such as GT3, GT4, and TCR cars, and minimally modified production vehicles mainly from the Japanese domestic market.

Super Taikyu races are held across all of Japan's major motor racing circuits, with formats including a single five-hour race, and a double-header format of two three-hour races. The series' largest event is the Fuji Super TEC 24 Hours, which is held annually at Fuji Speedway since its revival in 2018. Prior to that, the Tokachi 24 Hours was the series' largest event, held annually from 1994 until 2008.

Currently, Eneos and Bridgestone are the title sponsors of the main Super Taikyu series.

From 2026, Super Taikyu's organizers created a new racing series for national amateur drivers, titled "Super Taikyu Challenge", also, organizers announced a long-term for a third-tier for entry drivers tilted "My First Super Taikyu".

== Classes ==
The series has five domestic classes of vehicles originally based on the FIA Group N regulations and four international classes, two based on SRO Motorsports Group and one class each from regulations of WSC Group and ADAC.

The original Group N-based ST-1 to ST-4 classes are the four original classes, with a fifth production class, ST-5, launched in 2010. As is the case with the original Group N, displacement and drivetrain layouts distinguish theses classes.

In 2011, the series began adding cars from SRO Motorsports Group's internationally recognised Group GT3, originally called ST-GT3 but currently labeled as ST-X. In 2017, two other international classes, ST-Z for the SRO GT4 and ST-TCR for touring cars class homologated for the international TCR class. In 2021, the ADAC-based ST-Q was added. For November 2025, in association with the Automobile Competition Committee for the United States, ST-USA, for General Motors and Ford Motor Company GT cars such as the Chevrolet Corvette GT3 and Ford Mustang Dark Horse R (used in IMSA for a one-make series), will be introduced at Fuji.

=== ST-Q ===
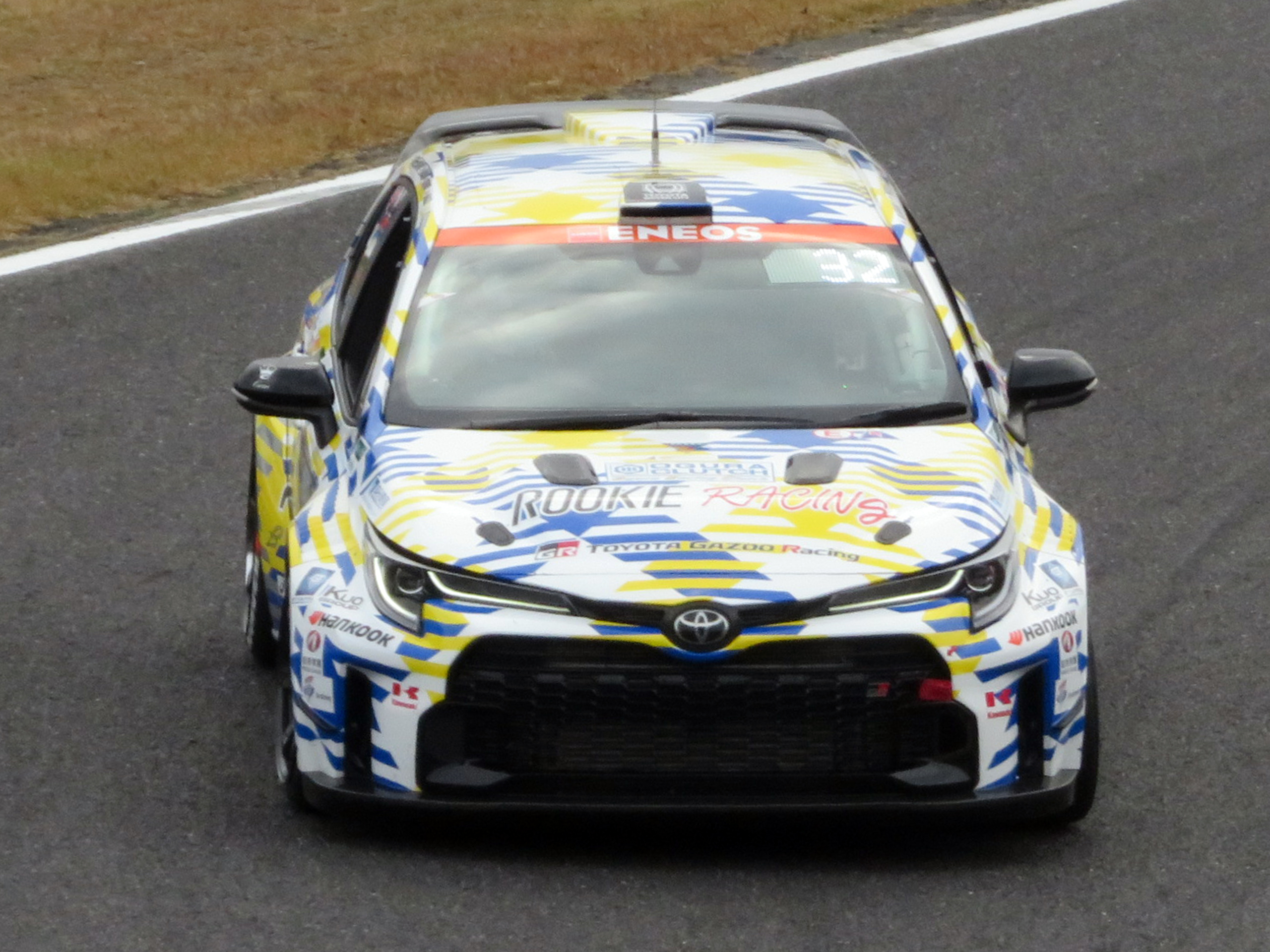
A Toyota GR Corolla ST-Q in 2022

In 2021, the ST-Q class was introduced for manufacturer-developed, non-homologated special racing vehicles, following with rules based on the ADAC NLS SP-X class. Toyota and ROOKIE Racing entered a modified Corolla Sport (GR Corolla) hatchback, equipped with a hydrogen-powered internal combustion engine, in ST-Q beginning in 2021. In the 2021 season finale, Mazda entered a modified version of their Demio (Mazda2) subcompact, powered by biofuel.

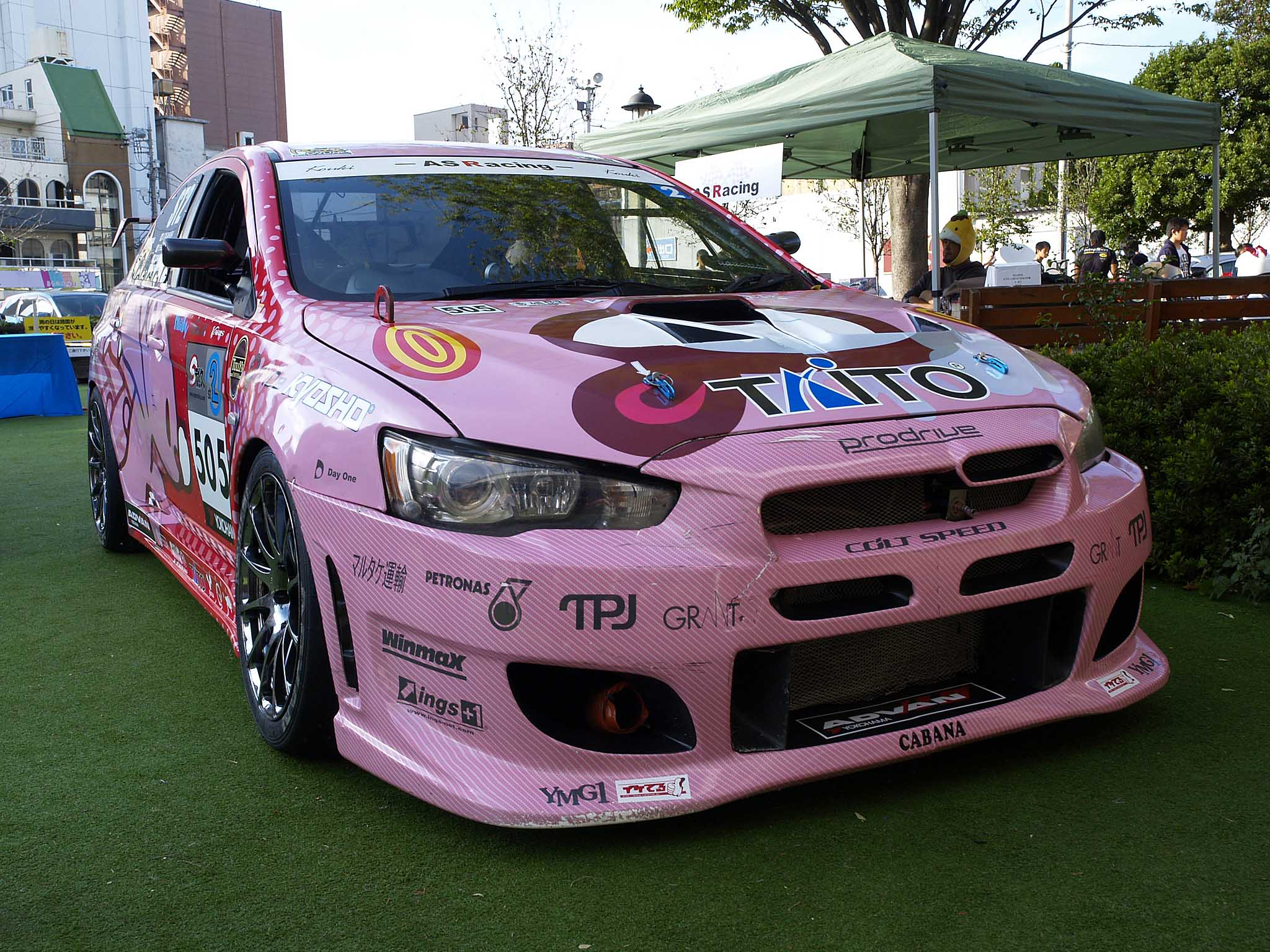
Mitsubishi Lancer Evo X ST-2 in 2013

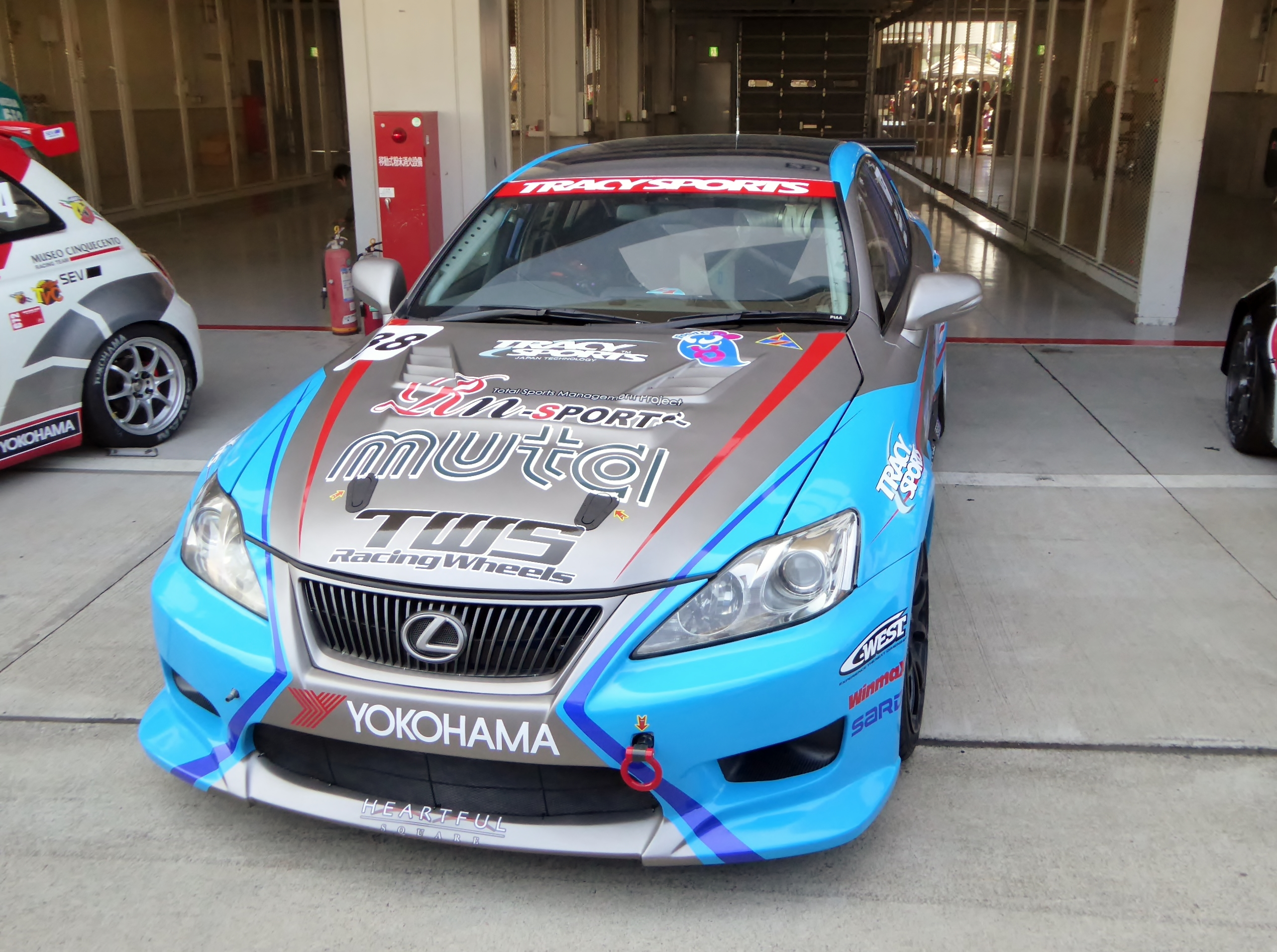
Lexus IS350 T-3 in 2015

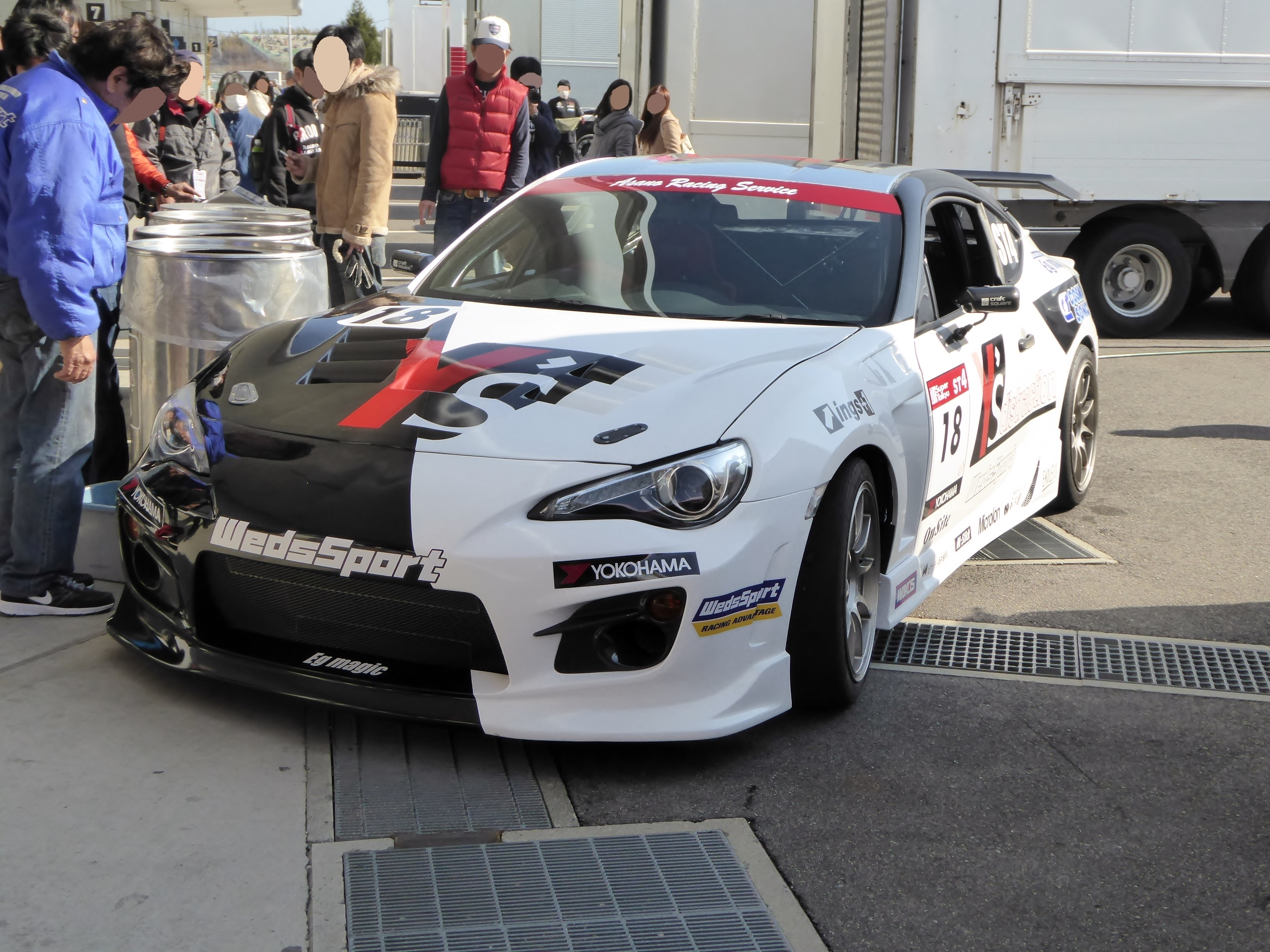
Toyota 86 ST-4 in 2015

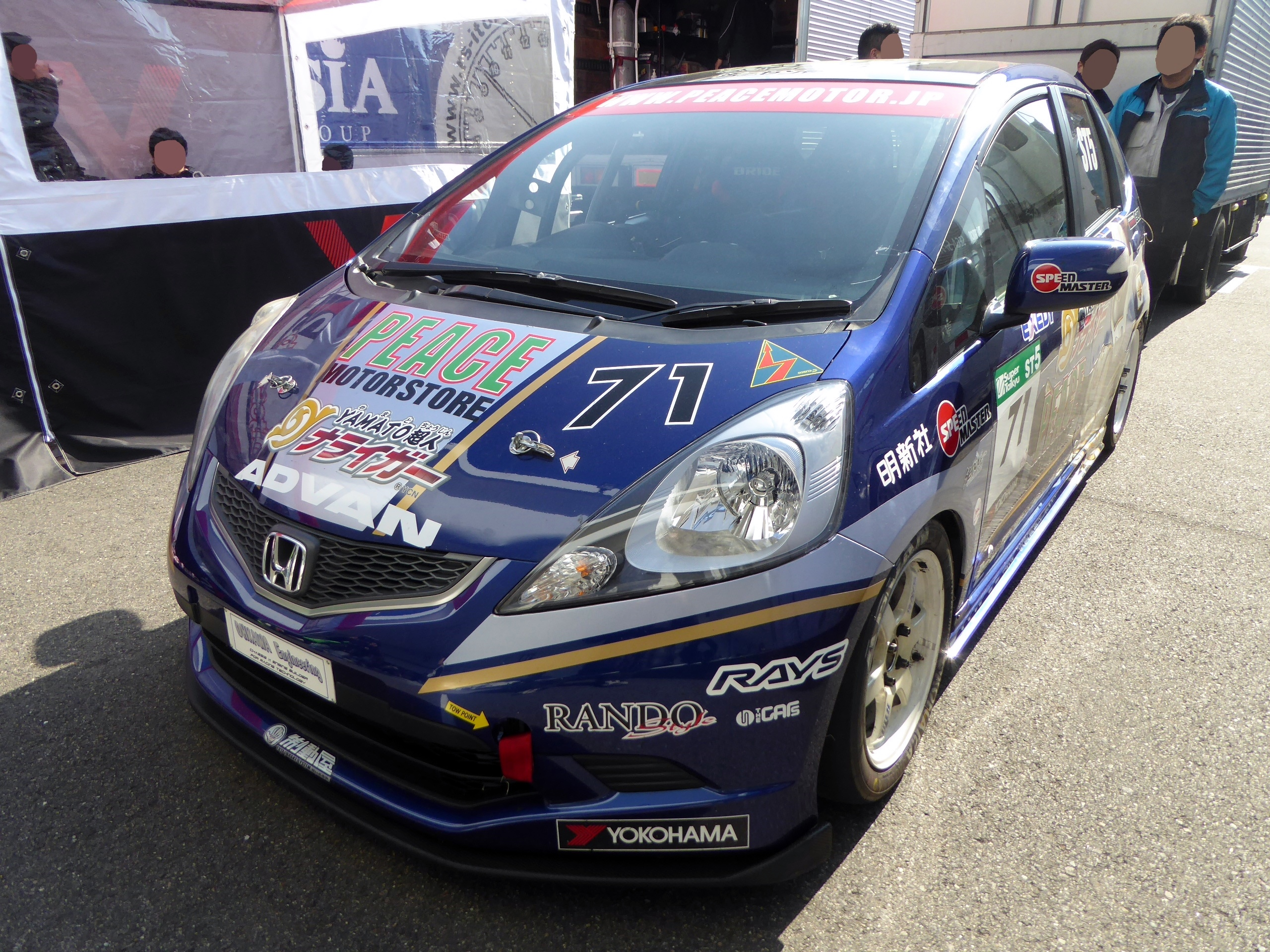
Honda Fit ST-5 in 2015

In 2022, Toyota and Subaru entered special versions of their GR86 and BRZ sports cars, adapted to run on carbon-neutral synthetic fuel. That same year, Nissan entered a "Racing Concept" version of their new Fairlady Z (RZ34) sports car, which served as the prototype for the Nissan Z GT4. Mazda introduced a new biodiesel concept, the Mazda3 Bio Concept, at the end of 2022.

The hydrogen GR Corolla will adopt the use of liquid hydrogen in 2023 - the first race car in the world to do so. Honda introduced a carbon-neutral fuel compatible version of the Civic Type R in 2023.

Name	Regulation	Example Vehicles
ST-X	SRO GT3 homologated vehicles	Nissan GT-R NISMO GT3; Lexus RC F GT3; Honda NSX GT3; Mercedes-AMG GT3; Aston Martin Vantage AMR GT3
ST-USA	SRO GT3 homologated, and one-make series cars exclusively from General Motors and Ford Motor Company.	Chevrolet Corvette; Ford Mustang
ST-Z	SRO GT4 homologated vehicles	Mercedes-AMG GT4; Porsche 718 Cayman GT4 Clubsport RS; Toyota GR Supra GT4; Nissan Z GT4; Audi R8 LMS GT4
ST-TCR	TCR homologated vehicles (must have current licence)	Audi RS3 LMS TCR; Honda Civic Type R TCR
ST-Q	NLS SPX based class. Approved racing vehicles not belonging to any other category	Toyota GR Corolla H2 Concept; Toyota GR86 / Subaru BRZ CNF Concept; Mazda3 Bio Concept; Mazda Demio / Mazda2 Bio Concept (2021–22); Nissan Z Racing Concept; Honda Civic Type R CNF-R
ST-1	Approved vehicles other than ST-2 through ST-5	Porsche 911 GT3 Cup; KTM X-Bow GTX; Toyota GR Supra; Aston Martin Vantage AMR GT8R
ST-2	2,400 cc - 3,500 cc 4WD and front-wheel drive vehicles	Mitsubishi Lancer Evolution; Subaru Impreza WRX STI; Toyota GR Yaris; Honda Civic Type R FK8/FL5
ST-3	2,400 cc - 3,500 cc rear-wheel drive vehicles	Lexus RC 350; Nissan Fairlady Z34/Z33; Toyota Crown RS
ST-4	1,500 cc - 2,500 cc vehicles	Toyota GR86 (ZN8); Toyota 86 / Subaru BRZ (ZN6/ZC6); Honda Integra Type R Honda S2000
ST-5 F/R	1,500 cc or below. Front and Rear wheel drive vehicles are in separate classes.	Honda Fit RS; Mazda Demio / Mazda2; Toyota Vitz / Yaris; Mazda Roadster (ND5RC)

NOTE: GT3, GT4, and TCR classes require homologation be current. GT4 and TCR classes must have had an FIA member club approved Balance of Performance test.

== Tyres ==
Yokohama was the series' official tyre supplier until the end of 2017. In 2018, Pirelli became the series' new tyre supplier as part of a three-year contract. In 2021, Hankook became the series' new tyre supplier. Their contract was to last for three years, ending in 2023, with the option to extend the contract through the end of the 2025 season.

Due to the fire at Hankook's manufacturing plant in Daejeon on 12 March 2023, Bridgestone signed a new three-year contract to take over as the tyre supplier of Super Taikyu beginning in 2024. On 24 April, it was announced that Bridgestone would take over as the series' tyre supplier with immediate effect on 24 April, prior to the second round of the 2023 season.

== Champions ==
=== ST-X/GT3 Class (2011–present) ===
Bold drivers indicate a driver that entered scored every possible point for their respective teams. Drivers listed in italics competed in a select number of rounds for their respective team.

Year	Team	Vehicle	Drivers
2024	(Japan) Zhongsheng ROOKIE Racing	Mercedes-AMG GT3 Evo	(France) Giuliano Alesi (Japan) Naoya Gamou (Japan) Tatsuya Kataoka (Japan) Ryūta Ukai
2023	(Japan) Zhongsheng ROOKIE Racing	Mercedes-AMG GT3 Evo	(Japan) Naoya Gamou (Japan) Tatsuya Kataoka (Japan) Hibiki Taira (Japan) Ryūta Ukai
2022	(Japan) HELM Motorsports	Nissan GT-R NISMO GT3	(Japan) Yutaka Toriba (Japan) Yūya Hiraki (Japan) Reiji Hiraki (Hong Kong) Shaun Thong (Rd.2)
2021	(Japan) D'station Racing	Aston Martin AMR Vantage GT3	(Japan) Satoshi Hoshino (Japan) Tomonobu Fujii (Japan) Tsubasa Kondō
2020	(Japan) Mercedes-AMG Team Hirix Racing	Mercedes-AMG GT3 Evo	(Japan) Daisuke Yamawaki (Hong Kong) Shaun Thong (Japan) Shinichi Takagi (Rd. 1–3) (Japan) Yūki Nemoto (Rd. 1, 4–5)
2019	(Japan) GTNET Motor Sports (Rd. 1–4, 6)	Nissan GT-R NISMO GT3	(Japan) Teruhiko Hamano (Japan) Kazuki Hoshino (Japan) Kiyoto Fujinami (Japan) Kazuki Hiramine (Rd. 3)
2018	(Japan) GTNET Motor Sports	Nissan GT-R NISMO GT3	(Japan) Teruhiko Hamano (Japan) Kazuki Hoshino (Japan) Kiyoto Fujinami (Japan) Hironobu Yasuda (Rd. 3) (China) Sun Zheng (Rd. 3)
2017	(Japan) ARN Racing	Ferrari 488 GT3	(Japan) Hiroaki Nagai (Japan) Kōta Sasaki (Japan) Tsubasa Mekaru (Rd. 5)
2016	(Japan) Kondo Racing	Nissan GT-R NISMO GT3	(Japan) Yūdai Uchida (Japan) Tomonobu Fujii (Japan) Kazuki Hiramine
2015	(Japan) Endless Sports	Nissan GT-R NISMO GT3	(Japan) Yukinori Taniguchi (Japan) Kyōsuke Mineo (Japan) Yūya Motojima
2014	(Japan) GTNET Motor Sports (Rd. 2–6)	Nissan GT-R NISMO GT3	(Japan) Kazuki Hoshino (Japan) Naofumi Omoto (Japan) Takayuki Aoki
2013	(Malaysia) Petronas Syntium Team	Mercedes-Benz SLS AMG GT3	(Malaysia) Melvin Moh (Japan) Nobuteru Taniguchi (Rd. 1-6) (Malaysia) Dominic Ang (Rd. 1-4, 6-7)
2012	(Malaysia) Petronas Syntium Team	Mercedes-Benz SLS AMG GT3	(Japan) Nobuteru Taniguchi (Malaysia) Dominic Ang (Malaysia) Fariqe Hairuman
2011	(Japan) Audi Team Hitotsuyama (Rd. 1–3)	Audi R8 LMS GT3	(Japan) Tomonobu Fujii (Japan) Akihiro Tsuzuki (United States) Michael Kim

=== ST-Z/GT4 Class (2017–present) ===
Bold drivers indicate a driver that was entered in every race for their respective team. Drivers listed in italics competed in a select number of rounds for their respective team.

Year	Team	Vehicle	Drivers
2023	(Japan) Saitama Toyopet GreenBrave	Toyota GR Supra GT4	(Japan) Rin Arakawa (Rd. 2, 7) (Japan) Naoki Hattori (Japan) Seita Nonaka (Rd. 1–6) (Japan) Manabu Yamazaki (Japan) Hiroki Yoshida
2023	(Japan) Saitama Toyopet GreenBrave	Toyota GR Supra GT4	(Japan) Naoki Hattori (Japan) Kohta Kawaai (Japan) Manabu Yamazaki (Japan) Hiroki Yoshida (Japan) Seita Nonaka (Rd. 2)
2022	(Japan) Team 5Zigen (Rd. 1-6)	Mercedes-AMG GT4	(Japan) Ryūichirō Otsuka (Japan) Kakunoshin Ohta (Japan) Toshihiro Kaneishi (Japan) Iori Kimura (Rd. 2)
2021	(Japan) Endless Sports	Mercedes-AMG GT4	(Japan) Yūdai Uchida (Japan) Hideki Yamauchi (Japan) Togo Suganami (Japan) Ryo Ogawa (Rd. 1, 3–5)
2020	(Japan) Endless Sports	Mercedes-AMG GT4	(Japan) Yūdai Uchida (Japan) Hideki Yamauchi (Japan) Tsubasa Takahashi (Japan) Shinnosuke Yamada (Rd. 1) (Japan) Ryūichirō Tomita (Rd. 1) (Japan) Togo Suganami (Rd. 4-5)
2019	(Japan) Endless Sports	Mercedes-AMG GT4	(Japan) Yūdai Uchida (Japan) Hideki Yamauchi (Japan) Tsubasa Takahashi (Japan) Shinnosuke Yamada (Rd. 3)
2018	(Japan) BEND (Rd. 3, 5)	Porsche Cayman GT4	(Japan) Masamitsu Ishihara (Japan) Daisuke Ikeda (Japan) Yūya Sakamoto (Japan) Shinya Hosokawa (Rd. 3) (Japan) Atsushi Yogō (Rd. 3)
2017	No entries		

=== ST-TCR Class (2017–present) ===
Year	Team	Vehicle	Drivers
2024	(Japan) M&K Racing	Honda Civic Type R TCR (FL5)	(South Korea) Lee Jung Woo (Japan) "Kizuna" (Japan) Sena Yamamoto
2023	(Japan) M&K Racing	Honda Civic Type R TCR (FL5)	(Japan) Mitsuhiro Endō (Japan) Yūsuke Mitsui (Rd. 4) (Japan) Tōsei Moriyama (Rd. 4–5) (Japan) Shinji Nakano (Rd. 5–7) (Japan) Takashi Kobayashi (Rd. 7)
2022	(Japan) Team Noah (Rd. 1-2, 4-5, 7)	Honda Civic Type R TCR	(Japan) Yoshikazu Sobu (Japan) Toshiro Tsukada (Rd. 1-2, 4) (Japan) Shigetomo Shimono (Rd. 1, 7) (Japan) Shingo Wada (Rd. 1, 7) (Japan) Yu Kanamaru (Rd. 2) (Japan) Koji Miura (Rd. 2) (Japan) "J" Antonio (Rd. 2, 5, 7) (Japan) Yuji Kiyotaki (Rd. 2, 4-5) (Japan) Yasuhiro Ogushi (Rd. 4) (Japan) Kuniyuki Haga (Rd. 5)
2021	(Japan) Team Noah	Honda Civic Type R TCR	(Japan) Yoshikazu Sobu (Japan) Shigetomo Shimono (Japan) Kuniyuki Haga (Rd. 1, 3, 5) (Japan) Riki Tanioka (Rd. 1, 3) (Japan) Toshiro Tsukada (Rd. 2–4, 6) (Japan) Yuji Kiyotaki (Rd. 2–4, 6) (Japan) Shingo Wada (Rd. 5)
2020	(Japan) Floral Racing with Uematsu	Honda Civic Type R TCR	(Japan) Tadao Uematsu (Japan) Yuji Ide (Japan) Shintaro Kawabata (Japan) Tomoki Nojiri (Rd. 1)
2019	(Japan) Birth Racing Project	Audi RS 3 LMS TCR	(Japan) Takeshi Matsumoto (Japan) Takuro Shinohara (Japan) "Hirobon" (Rd.1) (Japan) Yuya Ohta (Rd. 2–6) (Japan) Kouichi Okumura (Rd. 3)
2018	(Japan) Modulo Racing with Dome	Honda Civic Type R TCR	(Japan) Tadao Uematsu (Japan) Shinji Nakano (Japan) Hiroki Otsu (Japan) Takashi Kobayashi (Rd. 1, 3–6) (Japan) Keishi Ishikawa (Rd. 3)
2017	(Japan) Motul Dome Racing Project	Honda Civic Type R TCR	(Japan) Takuya Kurosawa (Japan) Keishi Ishikawa (Japan) Hiroki Katoh (Japan) Hiroki Yoshida (Rd. 5)

=== ST-1 Class (1991–present) ===
Bold drivers indicate a driver that entered scored every possible point for their respective teams. Drivers listed in italics competed in a select number of rounds for their respective team.

Year	Team	Vehicle	Drivers
2024	(Japan) K's Frontier KTM Cars	KTM X-Bow GTX	(Japan) Taiyō Iida (Japan) Hiroki Katoh (Japan) Kazuho Takahashi (Japan) Hiroki Yoshimoto (Japan) Takashi Kobayashi (Rd. 2)
2023	(Japan) K's Frontier KTM Cars	KTM X-Bow GTX	(Japan) Taiyō Iida (Japan) Hiroki Katoh (Japan) Kazuho Takahashi (Japan) Hiroki Yoshimoto (Japan) Takashi Kobayashi (Rd. 2)
2022	(Japan) K's Frontier KTM Cars	KTM X-Bow GTX	(Japan) Taiyō Iida (Japan) Hiroki Katoh (Japan) Kazuho Takahashi (Japan) Hiroki Yoshimoto (Japan) Takashi Kobayashi (Rd. 2)
2021	KTM Cars Japan	KTM X-Bow GTX	(Japan) Taiyō Iida (Japan) Hiroki Katoh (Japan) Kazuho Takahashi (Japan) Takashi Kobayashi (Rd. 3) (Japan) Hiroki Yoshimoto (Rd. 3–6)
2020	(Japan) ROOKIE Racing	Toyota GR Supra	(Japan) Naoya Gamou (Japan) Daisuke Toyoda (Japan) Yasuhiro Ogura (Japan) Shunsuke Kohno (Japan) Hisashi Yabuki (Rd. 1) (Japan) Kazuya Oshima (Rd. 1)
2019	(Japan) D'station Racing	Porsche 911 GT3 Cup	(Japan) Kenji Hama (Japan) Tatsuya Hoshino (Japan) Manabu Orido (Japan) Kenji Kobayashi (Rd. 3) (Japan) Tsubasa Kondō (Rd. 3)
2018	(Japan) D'station Racing	Porsche 911 GT3 Cup	(Japan) Kenji Hama (Japan) Tatsuya Hoshino (Japan) Manabu Orido (Japan) Kenji Kobayashi (Rd. 3) (Japan) Ryūichirō Tomita (Rd. 3) (South Korea) Lee Jung-woo (Rd. 3)
2017	(Japan) apr	Porsche 911 GT3 Cup	(Japan) Masami Kageyama (Japan) Katsuhito Ogawa (Japan) Ryūichirō Tomita
2016	(Japan) D'station Racing	Porsche 911 GT3 Cup	(Japan) Seiji Ara (Japan) Satoshi Hoshino (Japan) Tatsuya Hoshino (Rd. 4) (South Korea) Lee Jung-woo (Rd. 4)
2015	(Japan) BEND	BMW Z4 (E86)	(Japan) Daisuke Ikeda (Japan) Masamitsu Ishihara (Japan) Yūya Sakamoto (Japan) Atsushi Yogō
2014	(Japan) Tomei Sports	IPS kuruma01	(Japan) Osamu Hatakenaka (Rd. 1–5) (Japan) Ryō Hirakawa (Rd. 1–5) (Japan) Yuichi Nakayama (Rd. 1–5) (Italy) Andrea Caldarelli (Rd. 6) (Japan) Kenta Yamashita (Rd. 6)
2013	(Japan) Faust Racing Team	BMW Z4 (E86)	(Japan) Kazutomo Robert Hori (Japan) Shigeru Satō (Japan) Naoya Yamano (Rd. 1–5)
2012	(Japan) Endless Sports	NISMO Amuse 380RS	(Japan) Kyōsuke Mineo (Japan) Shinichi Takagi (Japan) Yukinori Taniguchi
2011	(Malaysia) Petronas Syntium Team	BMW Z4 (E86)	(Malaysia) Dominic Ang (Japan) Nobuteru Taniguchi (Japan) Masataka Yanagida
2010	(Malaysia) Petronas Syntium Team	BMW Z4 (E86)	(Malaysia) Imran Shaharom (Japan) Nobuteru Taniguchi (Japan) Masataka Yanagida
2009	(Malaysia) Petronas Syntium Team	BMW Z4 (E86)	(Malaysia) Fariqe Hairuman (Japan) Nobuteru Taniguchi (Japan) Masataka Yanagida
2008	(Malaysia) Petronas Syntium Team	BMW Z4 (E86)	(Malaysia) Johan bin Azdmi (Japan) Tatsuya Kataoka (Japan) Nobuteru Taniguchi

=== ST-3 Class (1991–present) ===
Bold drivers indicate a driver that entered scored every possible point for their respective teams. Drivers listed in italics competed in a select number of rounds for their respective team.

Year	Team	Vehicle	Drivers
2023	(Japan) TRACYSPORTS with DELTA	Lexus RC 350	(Japan) Shunsuke Ozaki (Japan) Yoshiyuki Tsuruga (Japan) Toshiki Ishimori (Japan) Takanobu Ishizuka (Rd. 2, 4–7) (Japan) Sesshū Kondō (Rd. 2)
2022	(Japan) TRACYSPORTS with DELTA	Lexus RC 350	(Japan) Yūsuke Tomibayashi (Japan) Takashi Itō (Japan) Hirotaka Ishii (Japan) Takuya Ōtaki (Rd. 1–2, 4) (Japan) Dai Mizuno (Rd. 2) (Japan) Gento Miyashita (Rd. 2)
2021	(Japan) TRACY SPORTS with Delta	Lexus RC 350	(Japan) Yūsuke Tomibayashi (Japan) Kazuya Ōshima (Japan) Hirotaka Ishii (Rd. 2–6) (Japan) Yoshiyuki Tsuruga (Rd. 3) (Japan) Ryūta Ukai (Rd. 3) (Japan) Akira Tuchida (Rd. 3)
2020	(Japan) TRACY SPORTS	Lexus RC 350	(Japan) Kazuya Ōshima (Japan) Yūsuke Tomibayashi (Japan) Hirotaka Ishii (Japan) Sesshū Kondō (Rd. 1) (Japan) Hirohito Itō (Rd. 1) (Japan) Yoshihiro Itō (Rd. 4)
2019	(Japan) TECHNO FIRST	Lexus RC 350	(Japan) Yūya Tezuka (Japan) Riki Ōkusa (Japan) Shūji Maejima (Japan) Takao Ohnishi (Rd. 3)
2018	(Japan) TRACY SPORTS	Lexus RC 350	(Japan) Makoto Hotta (Japan) Ryohei Sakaguchi (Japan) Morio Nitta (Rd. 3–4)
2017	(Japan) TRACYSPORTS	Lexus IS 350	(Japan) Yūya Tezuka (Japan) Shūji Maejima (Japan) Akira Suzuki (Japan) Taketoshi Matsui (Rd. 5)
2016	(Japan) TRACYSPORTS	Lexus IS 350	(Japan) Makoto Hotta (Japan) Ryohei Sakaguchi (Japan) Yūhi Sekiguchi (Rd. 4)
2015	(Japan) OKABEJIDOSHA motorsport	Nissan Fairlady Z (Z34)	(Japan) Masaaki Nagashima (Japan) Tooru Tanaka (Japan) Tetsuya Tanaka (Japan) Daisuke Imamura (Rd. 3)
2014	(Japan) Techno First Racing Team	Nissan Fairlady Z (Z34)	(Japan) Shūji Maejima (Japan) Masahiro Sasaki (Japan) Kazuki Hirokawa (Japan) Hironobu Yasuda (Rd. 3)
2013	(Japan) OTG Motor Sports	Lexus GS 350 (GRS191)	(Japan) Shinya Satō (Japan) Hiroki Yoshimoto (Rd. 1–2, 4–7) (Japan) Shigekazu Wakisaka (Rd. 3–7)
2012	(Japan) OKABE JIDOSHA motor sport	Mazda RX-7 (FD3S)	(Japan) Kazuomi Komatsu (Japan) Kenichi Sugibayashi (Japan) Yoshinobu Masuda
2011	(Japan) KOTA RACING	Honda NSX (NA2)	(Japan) Kōta Sasaki (Japan) Hiromasa Kitano (Japan) Tatsuya Hashimoto (Rd. 1, 3–4) (Japan) Tohjirō Azuma (Rd. 2, 5–6)
2010	(Japan) MAKIGUCHI ENGINEERING	BMW M3 (E46)	(Japan) Isao Ihashi (Japan) Hideki Hirota (Japan) Yoshihisa Namekata (Rd. 1–2) (Japan) Shinsuke Misawa (Rd. 3–7)
2009	(Japan) TEAM 5ZIGEN	Honda NSX (NA2)	(Japan) Katsuyuki Hiranaka (Japan) Kōsuke Matsuura (Japan) Hiroki Yoshimoto
2008	(Japan) EXEDY H.I.S. ings	Nissan Fairlady Z (Z33)	(Japan) Shūji Maejima (Japan) Masahiro Sasaki (Japan) Subaru Yamamoto (Rd. 4)

== Incidents ==
During a 2012 race at Suzuka Circuit (a support event for the 2012 FIA WTCC Race of Japan), Osamu Nakajima, driving a Nissan Fairlady Z (Z33), died after crashing into a barrier at the first corner of the circuit.

== Bibliography ==
=== Books ===
- Kotsu Times Sha (1992). Touring Car Race Tengoku: F1 yori N1 — N1耐久＆ワンメイクN1マシン図鑑 [Touring Car Race Heaven: N1 Over F1 — N1 Endurance & One-Make N1 Machine Illustrated Encyclopedia] (Comprehensive illustrated encyclopedia detailing the technical specifications of early 1990s N1 Endurance machinery.) (in Japanese). Tokyo: Kotsu Times Sha (交通タイムス社).
- Super Taikyu Organization (STO) (1991–1999). スーパー耐久シリーズ 規則、技術規則書 [Super Taikyu Series Official Sporting & Technical Regulations] (Official annual rulebooks detailing vehicle homologation, weight limits, and class restrictions for early Group N showroom-spec cars.) (in Japanese). Tokyo: Super Taikyu Organization.

=== Magazines ===
- "Saikyou N1 Machine徹底解剖 [Thorough Analysis of the Strongest N1 Machines]". AUTO SPORT (オートスポーツ) (Magazine issue documenting the launch and technical details of the inaugural racing season.) (in Japanese). No. 583. Tokyo: San-ei Shobo (三栄書房). June 15, 1991.
- "N1-spec Toyota Supra Debut". AUTO SPORT (オートスポーツ) (Contains technical reports on the introduction of the Class 1 Toyota Supra challenging the dominant R32 Nissan Skyline GT-R.) (in Japanese). No. 645. Tokyo: San-ei Shobo (三栄書房). December 15, 1993.
- "N1 Series Independent Tuning Shop Feature". Racing On (レーシングオン) (Cultural and background features focusing on independent tuning shops like Spoon Sports and HKS entering the N1 series.) (in Japanese). Tokyo: San-ei Shobo (formerly News Publishing). 1991–1994.

=== Audiovisual media ===
- Video Option (ビデオオプション) / Best Motoring Archives (VHS yearbooks and digital archives) (in Japanese). Tokyo: Sunpros / San-ei Group. 1991–1995 – via Sunpros.
