= 2013 SUGO GT 300km =

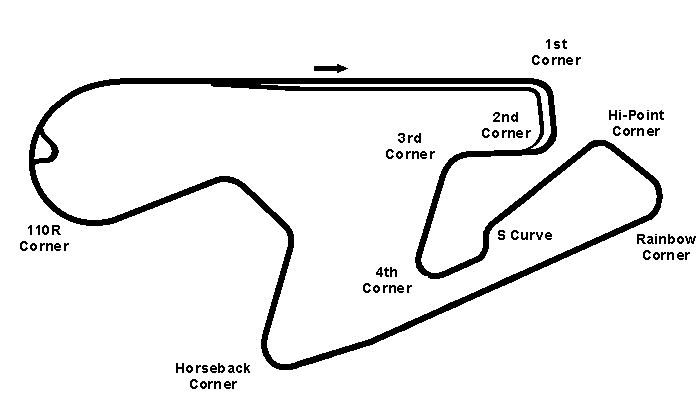
Layout of the Sugo

The 2013 SUGO GT 300km was the fourth round of the 2013 Super GT season. It took place on July 28, 2013.

== Race result ==
Race result is as follows.

Pos	No	Team	Drivers	Chassis	Tyre	Time/Difference	Laps
GT500
1	8	Autobacs Racing Team Aguri	(Republic of Ireland) Ralph Firman (Japan) Kosuke Matsuura	Honda HSV-010 GT	B	1:51:41.342	81
2	37	Lexus Team KeePer TOM'S	(Italy) Andrea Caldarelli (Japan) Daisuke Ito	Lexus SC430	B	+2.534	81
3	23	Motul Autech NISMO	(Italy) Ronnie Quintarelli (Japan) Masataka Yanagida	Nissan GT-R	MI	+5.536	81
4	39	Lexus Team DENSO SARD	(Japan) Hiroaki Ishiura (Japan) Juichi Wakisaka	Lexus SC430	B	+1 Lap	80
5	24	D'Station ADVAN Kondo Racing	(Germany) Michael Krumm (Japan) Hironobu Yasuda	Nissan GT-R	Y	+1 Lap	80
6	6	Lexus Team LeMans ENEOS	(Japan) Yuji Kunimoto (Japan) Kazuya Oshima	Lexus SC430	B	+1 Lap	80
7	1	S-Road REITO MOLA	(Japan) Satoshi Motoyama (Japan) Yuhi Sekiguchi	Nissan GT-R	MI	+2 Laps	79
8	32	Epson Nakajima Racing	(Japan) Ryo Michigami (Japan) Daisuke Nakajima	Honda HSV-010 GT	D	+2 Laps	79
9	19	Lexus Team WedsSport Bandoh	(Japan) Seiji Ara (Portugal) Andre Couto	Lexus SC430	Y	+2 Laps	79
10	36	Lexus Team Petronas TOM'S	(Japan) Kazuki Nakajima (United Kingdom) James Rossiter	Lexus SC430	B	+2 Laps	79
11	38	Lexus Team Zent Cerumo	(Japan) Kohei Hirate (Japan) Yuji Tachikawa	Lexus SC430	B	+8 Laps	73
12	100	Raybrig Team Kunimitsu	(Japan) Takuya Izawa (Japan) Takashi Kogure	Honda HSV-010 GT	B	+11 Laps	70
13	18	Weider Dome Racing	(France) Frédéric Makowiecki (Japan) Naoki Yamamoto	Honda HSV-010 GT	MI	+12 Laps	67
Ret	17	Keihin Real Racing	(Japan) Toshihiro Kaneishi (Japan) Koudai Tsukakoshi	Honda HSV-010 GT	B	+75 Laps	6
Ret	12	Calsonic Team Impul	(Brazil) João Paulo de Oliveira (Japan) Tsugio Matsuda	Nissan GT-R	B	+77 Laps	4
GT300
1	55	Autobacs Racing Team Aguri	(Japan) Takashi Kobayashi (Japan) Shinichi Takagi	Honda CR-Z	B	1:51:41.527	77
2	16	Team Mugen	(Japan) Hideki Mutoh (Japan) Yuhki Nakayama	Honda CR-Z	B	+8.958	77
3	0	Team Taisan Ken Endless	(Japan) Kyosuke Mineo (Japan) Naoki Yokomizo	Porsche 997 GT3	Y	+1:08.380	77
4	52	OKINAWA-IMP RACING with SHIFT	(Japan) Hironori Takeuchi (Japan) Takeshi Tsuchiya	Mercedes-Benz SLS AMG GT3	Y	+1 Lap	76
5	87	JLOC	(Japan) Hideki Yamauchi (Japan) Hiroki Yoshimoto	Lamborghini Gallardo GT3	Y	+1 Lap	76
6	61	R&D Sport	(Japan) Kota Sasaki (Japan) Tetsuya Yamano	Subaru BRZ	MI	+1 Lap	76
7	62	Leon Racing	(Japan) Haruki Kurosawa (Japan) Tsubasa Kurosawa	Mercedes-Benz SLS AMG GT3	Y	+1 Lap	76
8	21	Hitotsuyama Racing	(United Kingdom) Richard Lyons (Japan) Akihiro Tsuzuki	Audi R8 LMS ultra	HK	+1 Lap	76
9	3	NDDP Racing	(Japan) Kazuki Hoshino (Japan) Daiki Sasaki	Nissan GT-R GT3	Y	+1 Lap	76
10	10	Gainer	(Japan) Tetsuya Tanaka (Japan) Masayuki Ueda	Mercedes-Benz SLS AMG GT3	D	+1 Lap	76
11	48	Dijon Racing	(Japan) Katsumasa Chiyo (Japan) Hiroshi Takamori	Nissan GT-R GT3	Y	+1 Lap	76
12	86	JLOC	(Japan) Shinya Hosokawa (Japan) Koji Yamanishi	Lamborghini Gallardo GT3	Y	+2 Laps	75
13	11	Gainer	(Japan) Katsuyuki Hiranaka (Sweden) Björn Wirdheim	Mercedes-Benz SLS AMG GT3	D	+2 Laps	75
14	50	Arnage Racing	(Japan) Masaki Kano (Japan) Hideto Yasuoka	Aston Martin V12 Vantage GT3	Y	+3 Laps	74
15	4	GSR Hatsune Miku	(Japan) Tatsuya Kataoka (Japan) Nobuteru Taniguchi	BMW Z4 GT3	Y	+3 Laps	74
16	2	Cars Tokai Dream28	(Japan) Hiroki Katoh (Japan) Kazuho Takahashi	McLaren MP4-12C GT3	Y	+3 Laps	74
17	33	Hankook KTR	(Japan) Tomonobu Fujii (Japan) Masami Kageyama	Porsche 911 GT3-R	HK	+3 Laps	74
18	88	JLOC	(Japan) Takayuki Aoki (Japan) Manabu Orido	Lamborghini Gallardo GT3	Y	+3 Laps	74
19	22	R'Qs MotorSports	(Japan) Masaki Jyonai (Japan) Hisashi Wada	Mercedes-Benz SLS AMG GT3	Y	+4 Laps	73
20	30	apr	(Japan) Yuki Iwasaki (United States) Igor Sushko	Nissan GT-R GT3	Y	+3 Laps	74
21	9	Pacific Direction Racing	(Japan) Shogo Mitsuyama (Japan) You Yokomaku	Porsche 911 GT3-R	Y	+4 Laps	73
22	31	apr	(Japan) Morio Nitta (Japan) Koki Saga	Toyota Prius	Y	+6 Laps	71
23	360	Tomei Sports	(Japan) Takuya Shirasaka (Japan) Atsushi Tanaka	Nissan GT-R GT3	Y	+6 Laps	71
24	96	Dijon Racing	(Japan) Shin Ikegami (Japan) Masaki Tanaka	Callaway Corvette Z06.R GT3	Y	+7 Laps	70

Super GT
Previous race: International Series Malaysia	2013 season	Next race: Suzuka 1000km
