= 2018 Okayama GT 300km =

Motor racing meeting

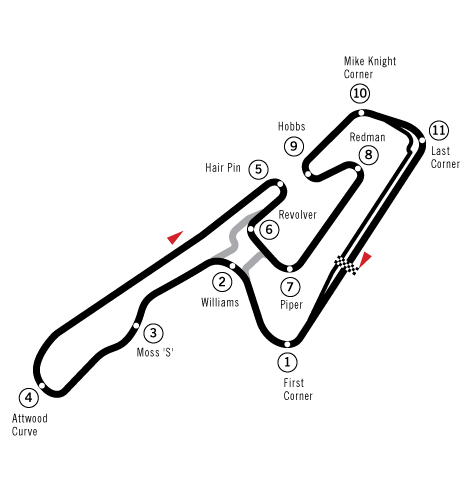
Layout of the Okayama International Circuit

The 2018 Okayama GT 300km was the first round of the 2018 Super GT Series. It was held at the Okayama International Circuit in Mimasaka, Okayama Prefecture, Japan.

The GT500 category was won by Koudai Tsukakoshi and Takashi Kogure in the #17 Real Racing Honda NSX-GT, whilst Yuhki Nakayama and Takashi Kobayashi won the GT300 category in the #18 Team UpGarage Toyota 86.

== Race Report ==
=== Qualifying ===
Rain affected both qualifying sessions for the GT500 and GT300 categories, which shuffled the grid owing to changing track conditions.

==== GT500 ====
In a what was tumultuous qualifying session, the #17 Real Racing outfit piloted by Koudai Tsukakoshi and Takashi Kogure achieved pole position, after the #24 Kondō Racing Nissan GT-R of Mitsunori Takaboshi and João Paulo de Oliveira had set the pace in the first qualifying session. 2009 Formula One World Champion Jenson Button qualified fifth on his Super GT debut, whilst Swede Felix Rosenqvist qualified in fourth place, cementing a solid run in his debut. One of the biggest shocks to come out of qualifying was the defending champions Ryō Hirakawa and Nick Cassidy failing to get into the second part of qualifying.

Pos	No	Team	Vehicle	Qualifying 1	Qualifying 2	Grid
1	17	Real Racing	Honda NSX-GT	1:18.351	1:26.905	1
2	8	Autobacs Racing Team Aguri	Honda NSX-GT	1:18.696	1:27.058	2
3	3	NDDP by B-Max Racing	Nissan GT-R	1:18.605	1:27.486	3
4	6	Lexus Team LeMans Wako's	Lexus LC 500	1:18.576	1:27.570	4
5	100	Team Kunimitsu	Honda NSX-GT	1:18.332	1:27.985	5
6	24	Kondō Racing	Nissan GT-R	1:18.160	1:28.659	6
7	19	Lexus Team WedsSport Bandoh	Lexus LC 500	1:18.619	1:29.793	7
8	23	NISMO	Nissan GT-R	1:18.370	1:35.248	8
9	1	Lexus Team KeePer Tom's	Lexus LC 500	1:18.796		9
10	38	Lexus Team ZENT Cerumo	Lexus LC 500	1:18.877		10
11	12	Team Impul	Nissan GT-R	1:18.944		11
12	16	Team Mugen	Honda NSX-GT	1:18.992		12
13	64	Nakajima Racing	Honda NSX-GT	1:18.994		13
14	36	Lexus Team au Tom's	Lexus LC 500	1:19.108		14
15	39	Lexus Team SARD	Lexus LC 500	1:19.315		15

==== GT300 ====
The qualifying session for the GT300 category was just as hectic. The Toyota 86 MC entries in the GT300 class appeared to be the pace setters throughout the weekend, with the #25 Tsuchiya Engineering entry of Takamitsu Matsui and Sho Tsuboi set the initial pace in Q1 with a time of 1:25.232. But, it was ultimately the #88 JLOC Lamborghini Huracán GT3 of Marco Mapelli and Kazuki Hiramine took the pole with a time of 1:33.925 in Q2.

Pos	No	Team	Vehicle	Qualifying 1	Qualifying 2	Grid
1	88	JLOC	Lamborghini Huracán GT3	1:26.220	1:33.925	16
2	21	Audi Team Hitotsuyama	Audi R8 LMS	1:25.966	1:34.082	17
3	11	Gainer	Nissan GT-R Nismo GT3	1:25.619	1:34.798	18
4	65	K2 R&D LEON Racing	Mercedes-AMG GT3	1:26.173	1:34.804	19
5	25	Tsuchiya Engineering	Toyota 86 MC	1:25.232	1:35.154	20
6	96	LM corsa	Lexus RC F GT3	1:26.043	1:35.236	21
7	31	apr	Toyota Prius apr GT	1:25.770	1:35.543	22
8	55	Autobacs Racing Team Aguri	BMW M6 GT3	1:26.307	1:35.729	23
9	18	Team UpGarage	Toyota 86 MC	1:25.926	1:35.756	24
10	61	R&D Sport	Subaru BRZ R&D Sport	1:25.674	1:36.623	25
11	777	CarGuy Racing	Honda NSX GT3	1:26.008	1:36.623	26
12	5	Team Mach	Toyota 86 MC	1:26.029	1:36.990	27
13	26	Team Taisan	Audi R8 LMS	1:26.141	1:37.176	28
14	2	Cars Tokai Dream28	Lotus Evora MC	1:25.492	1:43.462	29
15	0	Good Smile Racing with Team Ukyo	Mercedes-AMG GT3	1:26.316		30
16	34	Modulo Drago Corse	Honda NSX GT3	1:26.505		31
17	10	Gainer	Nissan GT-R Nismo GT3	1:26.524		32
18	52	Saitama Toyopet GreenBrave	Toyota Mark X MC	1:26.604		33
19	360	Tomei Sports	Nissan GT-R Nismo GT3	1:26.646		34
20	7	D'station Racing	Porsche 911 GT3-R	1:26.730		35
21	9	Pacific with Gulf Racing	Porsche 911 GT3-R	1:26.730		36
22	87	JLOC	Lamborghini Huracán GT3	1:26.880		37
23	50	Arnage Racing	Mercedes-AMG GT3	1:26.971		38
24	60	LM corsa	Lexus RC F GT3	1:27.001		39
25	30	apr	Toyota Prius apr GT	1:27.009		40
26	117	EIcars Bentley	Bentley Continental GT3	1:27.070		41
27	22	R'Qs Motor Sports	Mercedes-AMG GT3	1:27.339		42
28	35	Arto Panther Team Thailand	Lexus RC F GT3	1:27.587		43
29	48	Dijon Racing	Nissan GT-R Nismo GT3	1:27.779		44

=== Race ===
GT500 entries

Pos	Class	No	Entrant	Drivers	Vehicle	Laps	Time / Retired	Grid
1	GT500	17	Real Racing	(Japan) Koudai Tsukakoshi (Japan) Takashi Kogure	Honda NSX-GT	82	1hr 55min 14.381sec	1
2	GT500	100	Team Kunimitsu	(United Kingdom) Jenson Button (Japan) Naoki Yamamoto	Honda NSX-GT	82	+ 1.610 s	5
3	GT500	1	Lexus Team KeePer Tom's	(Japan) Ryō Hirakawa (New Zealand) Nick Cassidy	Lexus LC 500	82	+ 5.582 s	9
4	GT500	6	Lexus Team LeMans Wako's	(Japan) Kazuya Oshima (Sweden) Felix Rosenqvist	Lexus LC 500	82	+ 5.759 s	4
5	GT500	23	NISMO	(Japan) Tsugio Matsuda (Italy) Ronnie Quintarelli	Nissan GT-R	82	+ 36.990 s	8
6	GT500	24	Kondō Racing	(Japan) Mitsunori Takaboshi (Brazil) João Paulo de Oliveira	Nissan GT-R	82	+ 48.375 s	6
7	GT500	3	NDDP by B-Max Racing	(Japan) Satoshi Motoyama (Japan) Katsumasa Chiyo	Nissan GT-R	82	+ 59.362 s	3
8	GT500	38	Lexus Team ZENT Cerumo	(Japan) Hiroaki Ishiura (Japan) Yuji Tachikawa	Lexus LC 500	82	+ 1:00.357 s	10
9	GT500	19	Lexus Team WedsSport Bandoh	(Japan) Yuji Kunimoto (Japan) Kenta Yamashita	Lexus LC 500	82	+ 1:05.532 s	7
10	GT500	16	Team Mugen	(Japan) Hideki Mutoh (Japan) Daisuke Nakajima	Honda NSX-GT	82	+ 1:06.532 s	12
11	GT500	8	Autobacs Racing Team Aguri	(Japan) Tomoki Nojiri (Japan) Takuya Izawa	Honda NSX-GT	82	+ 1:07.199 s	2
12	GT500	39	Lexus Team SARD	(Finland) Heikki Kovalainen (Japan) Kamui Kobayashi	Lexus LC 500	82	+ 1:10.110 s	15
13	GT500	36	Lexus Team au Tom's	(Japan) Yuhi Sekiguchi (Japan) Kazuki Nakajima	Lexus LC 500	82	+ 1:11.410 s	14
14	GT500	12	Team Impul	(United Kingdom) Jann Mardenborough (Japan) Daiki Sasaki	Nissan GT-R	82	+ 1:11.838 s	11
15	GT500	64	Nakajima Racing	(Japan) Kosuke Matsuura (Belgium) Bertrand Baguette	Honda NSX-GT	81	+ 1 lap	13
16	GT300	18	Team UpGarage	(Japan) Yuhki Nakayama (Japan) Takashi Kobayashi	Toyota 86 MC	77	+ 5 laps	
17	GT300	7	D'station Racing	(Japan) Tomonobu Fujii (Germany) Sven Müller	Porsche 911 GT3 R	77	+ 5 laps	
18	GT300	25	Tsuchiya Engineering	(Japan) Takamitsu Matsui (Japan) Sho Tsuboi	Toyota 86 MC	77	+ 5 laps	
19	GT300	65	K2 R&D LEON Racing	(Japan) Haruki Kurosawa (Japan) Naoya Gamou	Mercedes-AMG GT3	77	+ 5 laps	
20	GT300	11	Gainer	(Japan) Katsuyuki Hiranaka (Japan) Hironobu Yasuda	Nissan GT-R Nismo GT3 (2018)	76	+ 6 laps	
21	GT300	55	Autobacs Racing Team Aguri	(Japan) Shinichi Takagi (United Kingdom) Sean Walkinshaw	BMW M6 GT3	76	+ 6 laps	
22	GT300	88	JLOC	(Japan) Kazuki Hiramine (Italy) Marco Mapelli	Lamborghini Huracán GT3	76	+ 6 laps	
23	GT300	0	Goodsmile Racing by Team Ukyo	(Japan) Nobuteru Taniguchi (Japan) Tatsuya Kataoka	Mercedes-AMG GT3	76	+ 6 laps	
24	GT300	26	Team Taisan	(Japan) Shinnosuke Yamada (Japan) Shintaro Kawabata	Audi R8 LMS	76	+ 6 laps	
25	GT300	50	Arnage Racing	(Japan) Masaki Kano (Japan) Hideto Yasuoka	Mercedes-AMG GT3	76	+ 6 laps	
26	GT300	52	Saitama Toyopet GreenBrave	(Japan) Taku Bamba (Japan) Shigekazu Wakisaka	Toyota Mark X MC	76	+ 6 laps	
27	GT300	87	JLOC	(Japan) Yuya Motojima (Japan) Kimiya Sato	Lamborghini Huracán GT3	76	+ 6 laps	
28	GT300	10	Gainer	(Japan) Kazuki Hoshino (Japan) Hiroki Yoshida	Nissan GT-R Nismo GT3 (2018)	76	+ 6 laps	
29	GT300	96	K-Tunes Racing LM Corsa	(Japan) Yuichi Nakayama (Japan) Morio Nitta	Lexus RC F GT3	76	+ 6 laps	
30	GT300	777	CarGuy Racing	(Japan) Takeshi Kimura (Japan) Naoki Yokomizo	Honda NSX GT3	76	+ 6 laps	
31	GT300	9	Pacific with Gulf Racing	(Japan) Rintaro Kubo (Japan) Keishi Ishikawa	Porsche 911 GT3 R	76	+ 6 laps	
32	GT300	60	LM Corsa – OTG Motor Sports	(Japan) Hiroki Yoshimoto (Japan) Ritomo Miyata	Lexus RC F GT3	75	+ 7 laps	
33	GT300	61	R&D Sport	(Japan) Takuto Iguchi (Japan) Hideki Yamauchi	Subaru BRZ R&D Sport	75	+ 7 laps	
34	GT300	22	R'Qs Motor Sports	(Japan) Masaki Jyonai (Japan) Hisashi Wada	Mercedes-AMG GT3	75	+ 7 laps	
35	GT300	30	apr Racing	(Japan) Hiroaki Nagai (Japan) Kota Sasaki	Toyota Prius apr GT	75	+ 7 laps	
36	GT300	117	Elcars Bentley	(Japan) Yuji Ide (Japan) Ryohei Sakaguchi	Bentley Continental GT3 (2016)	74	+ 8 laps	
37	GT300	48	Dijon Racing	(Japan) Masaki Tanaka (Japan) Taiyou Iida	Nissan GT-R Nismo GT3 (2017)	74	+ 8 laps	
38	GT300	2	Cars Tokai Dream28	(Japan) Kazuho Takahashi (Japan) Hiroki Katoh	Lexus Evora MC	74	+ 8 laps	
39	GT300	35	Arto Panther Team Thailand	(Thailand) Nattavude Charoensukhawatana (Thailand) Nattapong Horthongkum	Lexus RC F GT3	74	+ 8 laps	
Ret	GT300	21	Audi Team Hitotsuyama	(United Kingdom) Richard Lyons (Japan) Ryuichiro Tomita	Audi R8 LMS	42	Retired	
Ret	GT300	5	Team Mach	(Japan) Natsu Sakaguchi (Japan) Yuya Hiraki	Toyota 86 MC	41	Retired	
Ret	GT300	31	apr Racing	(Japan) Natsu Sakaguchi (Japan) Yuya Hiraki	Toyota Prius apr GT	30	Retired	
Ret	GT300	34	Modulo Drago Corse	(Japan) Ryo Michigami (Japan) Hiroki Otsu	Honda NSX GT3	18	Retired	
Ret	GT300	360	Tomei Sports	(Japan) Yusaku Shibata (Japan) Takayuki Aoki	Honda NSX GT3	17	Retired	

Preceded by 2017 Motegi GT 250km	Super GT; 2018	Succeeded by 2018 Fuji GT 500km
