= 2018 Super GT Series =

Japanese motorsport racing season

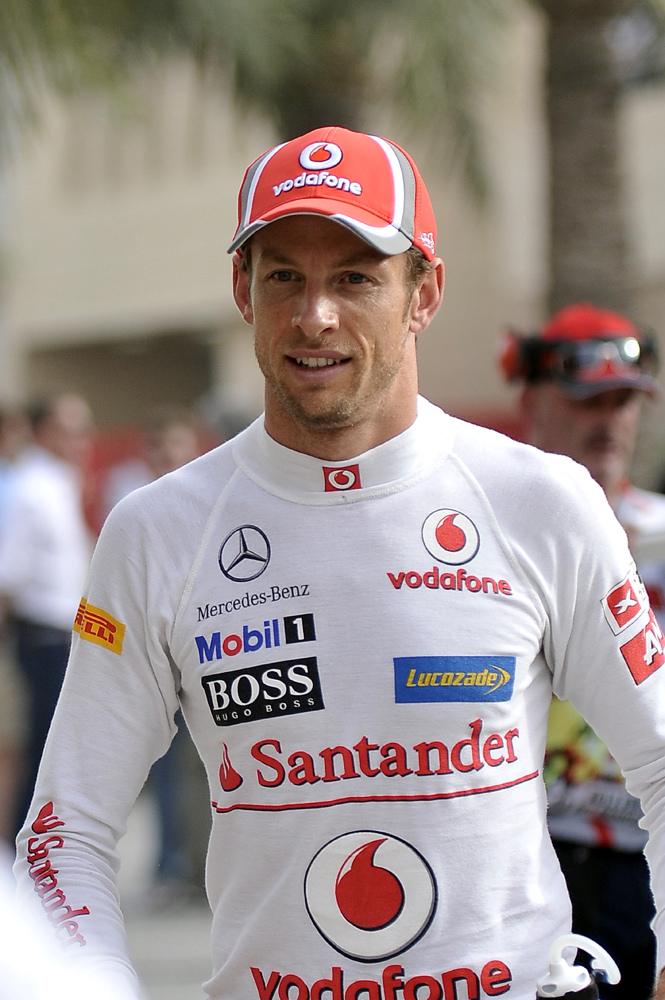
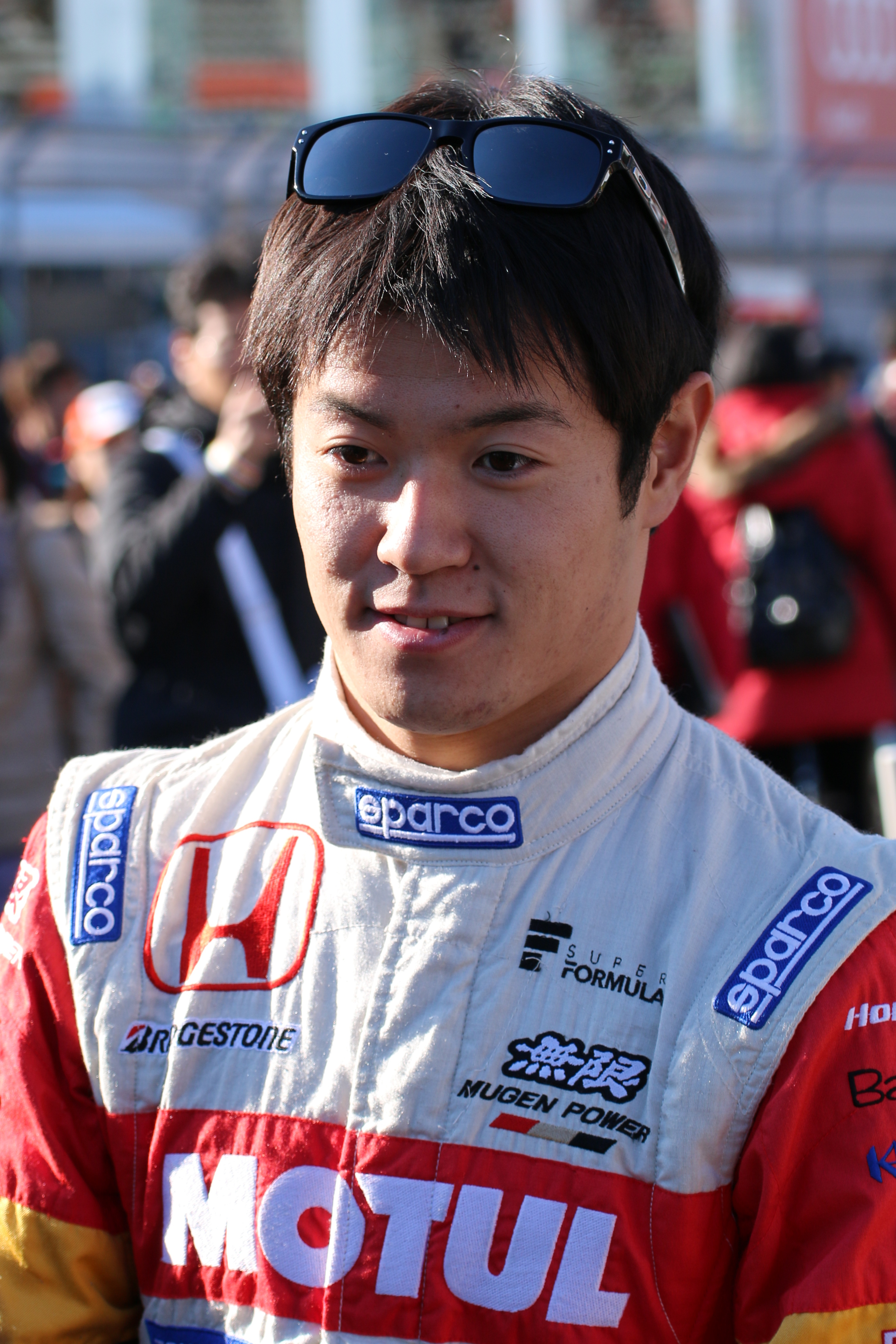
Jenson Button and Naoki Yamamoto (pictured in 2012 and 2013, respectively) won the GT500 title.

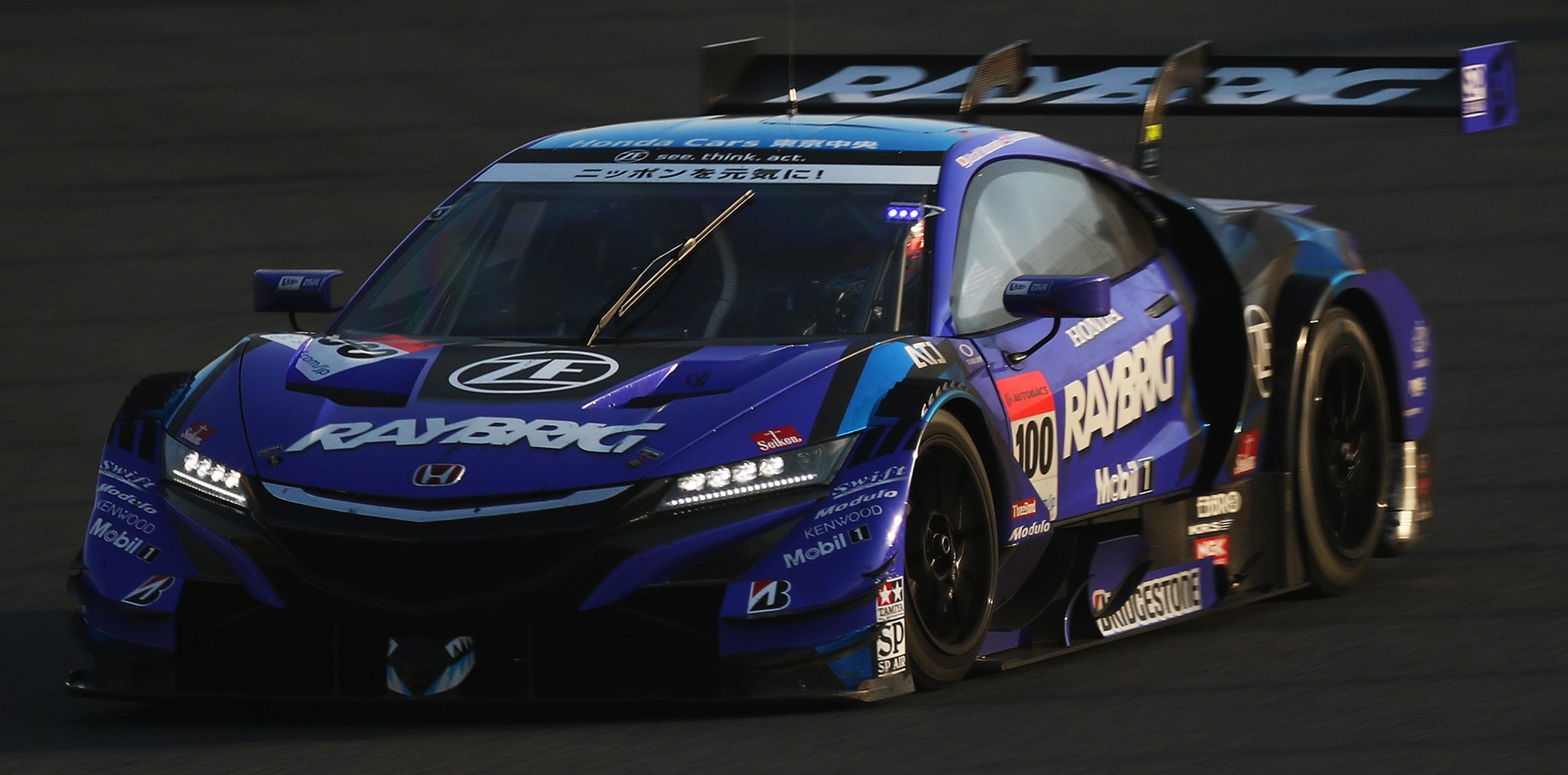
2018 GT500 champions, No. 100 Raygtbrig Team Kunimitsu Honda NSX-GT

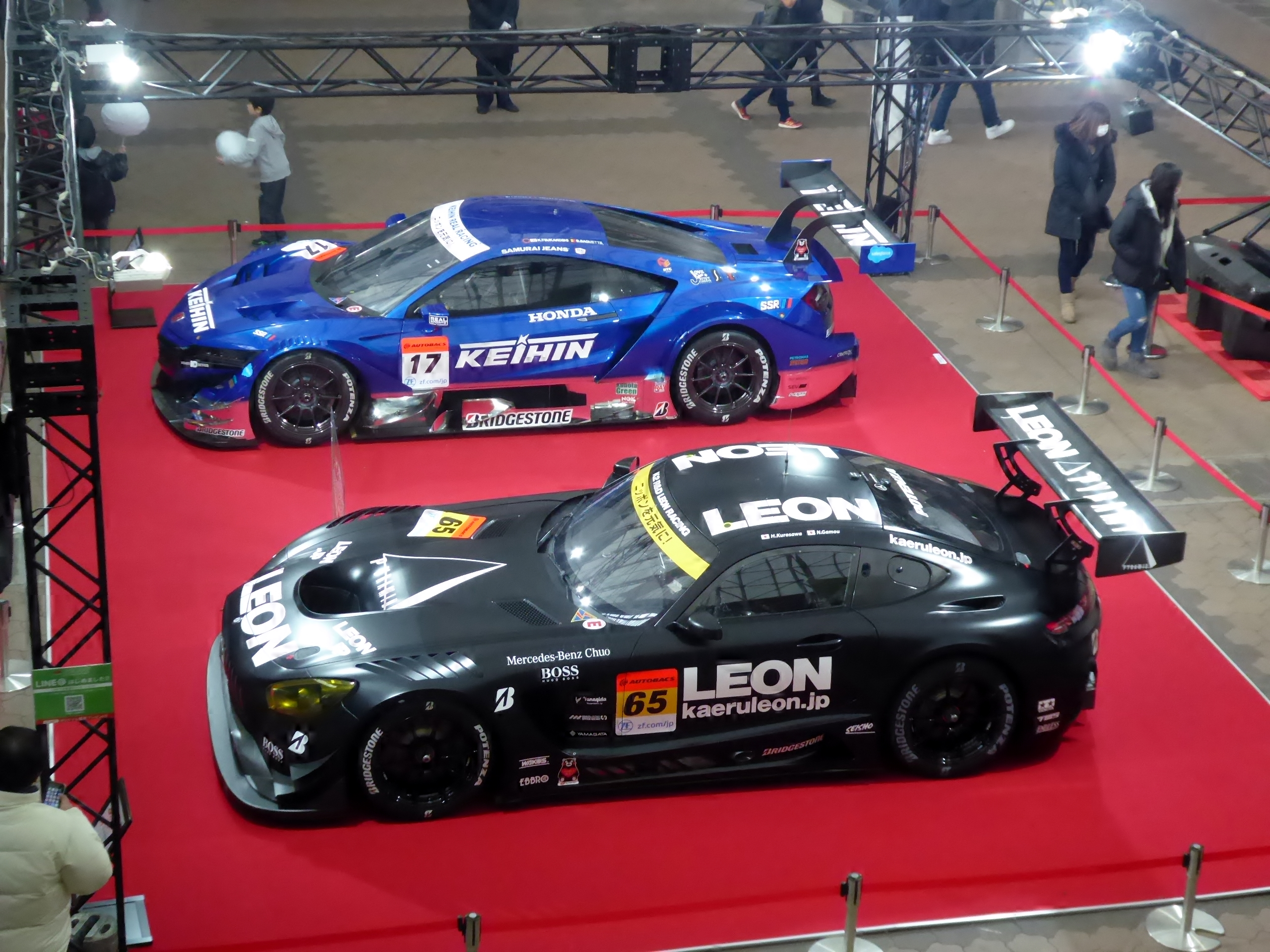
Both 2018 GT500 and GT300 championship-winning vehicles at the Osaka Auto Messe

The 2018 Autobacs Super GT Series was the twenty-sixth season of the Japan Automobile Federation Super GT Championship including the All Japan Grand Touring Car Championship (JGTC) era and the fourteenth season the series has competed under the Super GT name. It was the thirty-sixth overall season of a national JAF sportscar championship dating back to the All Japan Sports Prototype Championship. The season began on April 8 and ended on November 11, after 8 races.

In the GT500 class, Team Kunimitsu won their first-ever championship with the all-star lineup of series veteran Naoki Yamamoto and 2009 Formula One champion Jenson Button, narrowly beating defending champions Ryō Hirakawa and Nick Cassidy at the final race in Motegi to clinch the title after both teams came in to the race tied in points. It was the first championship title for Honda in the GT500 class since 2010. Yamamoto, who had won the 2018 Super Formula title before the season finale, became just the fourth driver to win both the GT500 and Super Formula titles in the same year, while Button became the first rookie to win the GT500 title since Tora Takagi in 2005.

In the GT300 class, the No. 65 LEON CVSTOS AMG fielded by K2 R&D LEON Racing won the championship in Motegi after overcoming a 12-point deficit over the then-points leader No. 55 ARTA BMW, giving series veteran Haruki Kurosawa and Naoya Gamou their first championship title in the series. The No. 55 ARTA team, despite winning two races in the season, were ultimately too inconsistent in their championship challenge, as two races without scoring a point coupled with poor performance in both Sugo and Motegi ultimately cost them the championship over the more consistent LEON AMG. The No. 31 Toyota Prius apr GT of Koki Saga and Kohei Hirate would finish third, just one point behind the ARTA BMW, while defending champions Goodsmile Racing finished fourth after a poor start to the season and a tire issue in Autopolis ultimately cost them the chance to defend the title.

== Schedule ==
Round	Race	Circuit	Date
1	Okayama GT; 300 km	(Japan) Okayama International Circuit	April 7–8
2	Fuji GT; 500 km	(Japan) Fuji Speedway	May 3–4
3	Suzuka GT; 300 km	(Japan) Suzuka Circuit	May 19–20
4	Buriram United Super GT Race; 300 km	(Thailand) Chang International Circuit	June 30 – July 1
5	Fuji GT; 500 miles	(Japan) Fuji Speedway	August 4–5
6	Sugo GT; 300 km	(Japan) Sportsland Sugo	September 15–16
7	Autopolis GT; 300 km	(Japan) Autopolis	October 20–21
8	Motegi GT; 250 km	(Japan) Twin Ring Motegi	November 10–11

=== Schedule changes ===
- On March 4, 2017, Suzuka Circuit, the Stéphane Ratel Organisation, and the GT Association announced that the Suzuka 1000km would become the Suzuka 10 Hours from 2018, and moves to the Intercontinental GT Challenge. The Super GT championship round at Suzuka moves to May 19–20 and will be a 300km race, as it was from 1995 to 2010.
- To replace the Suzuka 1000km as the series' endurance round, the Fuji GT 300km, held in early August, was lengthened to a 500 mile (804 kilometer) race. The Fuji 500 Mile Race was originally held from 1977 to 1992.
- The race at Buriram United International Circuit in Thailand was moved from the seventh to the fourth round of the championship, on June 30 – July 1.
- The race at Sportsland Sugo was moved from the fourth to the sixth round of the championship, on September 15–16.
- The race at Autopolis was moved from the third to the seventh round of the championship, on October 20–21.

== Teams and drivers ==
=== GT500 ===
Team	Car	Engine	Make	No.	Drivers	Tyre	Rounds
(Japan) Lexus Team KeePer TOM'S	Lexus	Lexus LC500 GT500	Lexus RI4AG 2.0 L Turbo I4	1	(Japan) Ryō Hirakawa	B	All
(Japan) Lexus Team KeePer TOM'S	Lexus	Lexus LC500 GT500	Lexus RI4AG 2.0 L Turbo I4	1	(New Zealand) Nick Cassidy	B	All
(Japan) Lexus Team au TOM'S	Lexus	Lexus LC500 GT500	Lexus RI4AG 2.0 L Turbo I4	36	(Japan) Kazuki Nakajima	B	1, 3–8
(Japan) Lexus Team au TOM'S	Lexus	Lexus LC500 GT500	Lexus RI4AG 2.0 L Turbo I4	36	(Japan) Yuhi Sekiguchi	B	All
(Japan) Lexus Team au TOM'S	Lexus	Lexus LC500 GT500	Lexus RI4AG 2.0 L Turbo I4	36	(United Kingdom) James Rossiter	B	2
(Japan) NDDP by B-Max Racing	Nissan	Nissan GT-R NISMO GT500	Nissan NR20A 2.0 L Turbo I4	3	(Japan) Satoshi Motoyama	M	All
(Japan) NDDP by B-Max Racing	Nissan	Nissan GT-R NISMO GT500	Nissan NR20A 2.0 L Turbo I4	3	(Japan) Katsumasa Chiyo	M	All
(Japan) Lexus Team LeMans Wako's	Lexus	Lexus LC500 GT500	Lexus RI4AG 2.0 L Turbo I4	6	(Japan) Kazuya Oshima	B	All
(Japan) Lexus Team LeMans Wako's	Lexus	Lexus LC500 GT500	Lexus RI4AG 2.0 L Turbo I4	6	(Sweden) Felix Rosenqvist	B	1–2, 4–8
(Japan) Lexus Team LeMans Wako's	Lexus	Lexus LC500 GT500	Lexus RI4AG 2.0 L Turbo I4	6	(United Kingdom) James Rossiter	B	3
(Japan) Autobacs Racing Team Aguri	Honda	Honda NSX-GT	Honda HR-417E 2.0 L Turbo I4	8	(Japan) Tomoki Nojiri	B	All
(Japan) Autobacs Racing Team Aguri	Honda	Honda NSX-GT	Honda HR-417E 2.0 L Turbo I4	8	(Japan) Takuya Izawa	B	All
(Japan) Team Impul	Nissan	Nissan GT-R NISMO GT500	Nissan NR20A 2.0 L Turbo I4	12	(Japan) Daiki Sasaki	B	All
(Japan) Team Impul	Nissan	Nissan GT-R NISMO GT500	Nissan NR20A 2.0 L Turbo I4	12	(United Kingdom) Jann Mardenborough	B	All
(Japan) Team Mugen	Honda	Honda NSX-GT	Honda HR-417E 2.0 L Turbo I4	16	(Japan) Hideki Mutoh	Y	All
(Japan) Team Mugen	Honda	Honda NSX-GT	Honda HR-417E 2.0 L Turbo I4	16	(Japan) Daisuke Nakajima	Y	All
(Japan) REAL Racing	Honda	Honda NSX-GT	Honda HR-417E 2.0 L Turbo I4	17	(Japan) Koudai Tsukakoshi	B	All
(Japan) REAL Racing	Honda	Honda NSX-GT	Honda HR-417E 2.0 L Turbo I4	17	(Japan) Takashi Kogure	B	All
(Japan) Lexus Team WedsSport Bandoh	Lexus	Lexus LC500 GT500	Lexus RI4AG 2.0 L Turbo I4	19	(Japan) Yuji Kunimoto	Y	All
(Japan) Lexus Team WedsSport Bandoh	Lexus	Lexus LC500 GT500	Lexus RI4AG 2.0 L Turbo I4	19	(Japan) Kenta Yamashita	Y	All
(Japan) NISMO	Nissan	Nissan GT-R NISMO GT500	Nissan NR20A 2.0 L Turbo I4	23	(Japan) Tsugio Matsuda	M	All
(Japan) NISMO	Nissan	Nissan GT-R NISMO GT500	Nissan NR20A 2.0 L Turbo I4	23	(Italy) Ronnie Quintarelli	M	All
(Japan) Kondo Racing	Nissan	Nissan GT-R NISMO GT500	Nissan NR20A 2.0 L Turbo I4	24	(Brazil) João Paulo de Oliveira	Y	All
(Japan) Kondo Racing	Nissan	Nissan GT-R NISMO GT500	Nissan NR20A 2.0 L Turbo I4	24	(Japan) Mitsunori Takaboshi	Y	All
(Japan) Lexus Team ZENT Cerumo	Lexus	Lexus LC500 GT500	Lexus RI4AG 2.0 L Turbo I4	38	(Japan) Yuji Tachikawa	B	All
(Japan) Lexus Team ZENT Cerumo	Lexus	Lexus LC500 GT500	Lexus RI4AG 2.0 L Turbo I4	38	(Japan) Hiroaki Ishiura	B	All
(Japan) Lexus Team SARD	Lexus	Lexus LC500 GT500	Lexus RI4AG 2.0 L Turbo I4	39	(Finland) Heikki Kovalainen	B	All
(Japan) Lexus Team SARD	Lexus	Lexus LC500 GT500	Lexus RI4AG 2.0 L Turbo I4	39	(Japan) Kamui Kobayashi	B	1, 3–8
(Japan) Lexus Team SARD	Lexus	Lexus LC500 GT500	Lexus RI4AG 2.0 L Turbo I4	39	(Japan) Sho Tsuboi	B	2
(Japan) Nakajima Racing	Honda	Honda NSX-GT	Honda HR-417E 2.0 L Turbo I4	64	(Belgium) Bertrand Baguette	D	All
(Japan) Nakajima Racing	Honda	Honda NSX-GT	Honda HR-417E 2.0 L Turbo I4	64	(Japan) Kosuke Matsuura	D	All
(Japan) Team Kunimitsu	Honda	Honda NSX-GT	Honda HR-417E 2.0 L Turbo I4	100	(Japan) Naoki Yamamoto	B	All
(Japan) Team Kunimitsu	Honda	Honda NSX-GT	Honda HR-417E 2.0 L Turbo I4	100	(United Kingdom) Jenson Button	B	All

=== GT300 ===
Team	Make	Car	Engine	No.	Drivers	Tyre	Rounds
(Japan) Goodsmile Racing with Team Ukyo	Mercedes-AMG	Mercedes-AMG GT3	Mercedes-AMG M159 6.2 L V8	0	(Japan) Nobuteru Taniguchi	Y	All
(Japan) Goodsmile Racing with Team Ukyo	Mercedes-AMG	Mercedes-AMG GT3	Mercedes-AMG M159 6.2 L V8	0	(Japan) Tatsuya Kataoka	Y	All
(Japan) Cars Tokai Dream28	Lotus	Lotus Evora MC	GTA V8 4.5 L V8	2	(Japan) Kazuho Takahashi	Y	All
(Japan) Cars Tokai Dream28	Lotus	Lotus Evora MC	GTA V8 4.5 L V8	2	(Japan) Hiroki Katoh	Y	All
(Japan) Team Mach	Toyota	Toyota 86 MC	GTA V8 4.5 L V8	5	(Japan) Natsu Sakaguchi	Y	1–3, 5–8
(Japan) Team Mach	Toyota	Toyota 86 MC	GTA V8 4.5 L V8	5	(Japan) Yuya Hiraki	Y	1–3, 5–8
(Japan) Team Mach	Toyota	Toyota 86 MC	GTA V8 4.5 L V8	5	(Japan) Tetsuji Tamanaka	Y	2
(Japan) Team Mach	Toyota	Toyota 86 MC	GTA V8 4.5 L V8	5	(Japan) Kiyoto Fujinami	Y	5
(Japan) D'station Racing	Porsche	Porsche 911 GT3 R	Porsche M97/80 4.0 L F6	7	(Japan) Tomonobu Fujii	Y	All
(Japan) D'station Racing	Porsche	Porsche 911 GT3 R	Porsche M97/80 4.0 L F6	7	(Germany) Sven Müller	Y	All
(Japan) Pacific with Gulf Racing	Porsche	Porsche 911 GT3 R	Porsche M97/80 4.0 L F6	9	(Japan) Rintaro Kubo	Y	All
(Japan) Pacific with Gulf Racing	Porsche	Porsche 911 GT3 R	Porsche M97/80 4.0 L F6	9	(Japan) Keishi Ishikawa	Y	All
(Japan) Pacific with Gulf Racing	Porsche	Porsche 911 GT3 R	Porsche M97/80 4.0 L F6	9	(Japan) Kyosuke Mineo	Y	5
(Japan) GAINER	Nissan	Nissan GT-R Nismo GT3 (2018)	Nissan VR38DETT 3.8 L Twin Turbo V6	10	(Japan) Kazuki Hoshino	Y	All
(Japan) GAINER	Nissan	Nissan GT-R Nismo GT3 (2018)	Nissan VR38DETT 3.8 L Twin Turbo V6	10	(Japan) Hiroki Yoshida	Y	All
(Japan) GAINER	Nissan	Nissan GT-R Nismo GT3 (2018)	Nissan VR38DETT 3.8 L Twin Turbo V6	11	(Japan) Katsuyuki Hiranaka	D	All
(Japan) GAINER	Nissan	Nissan GT-R Nismo GT3 (2018)	Nissan VR38DETT 3.8 L Twin Turbo V6	11	(Japan) Hironobu Yasuda	D	All
(Japan) Team UpGarage	Toyota	Toyota 86 MC	GTA V8 4.5 L V8	18	(Japan) Yuhki Nakayama	Y	All
(Japan) Team UpGarage	Toyota	Toyota 86 MC	GTA V8 4.5 L V8	18	(Japan) Takashi Kobayashi	Y	All
(Japan) Audi Team Hitotsuyama	Audi	Audi R8 LMS	Audi DAR 5.2 L V10	21	(United Kingdom) Richard Lyons	D	All
(Japan) Audi Team Hitotsuyama	Audi	Audi R8 LMS	Audi DAR 5.2 L V10	21	(Japan) Ryuichiro Tomita	D	All
(Japan) Audi Team Hitotsuyama	Audi	Audi R8 LMS	Audi DAR 5.2 L V10	21	(Japan) Takuro Shinohara	D	2
(Japan) R'Qs Motor Sports	Mercedes-AMG	Mercedes-AMG GT3	Mercedes-AMG M159 6.2 L V8	22	(Japan) Hisashi Wada	Y	1–3, 5–8
(Japan) R'Qs Motor Sports	Mercedes-AMG	Mercedes-AMG GT3	Mercedes-AMG M159 6.2 L V8	22	(Japan) Masaki Jyonai	Y	1–3, 5–8
(Japan) R'Qs Motor Sports	Mercedes-AMG	Mercedes-AMG GT3	Mercedes-AMG M159 6.2 L V8	22	(Japan) Masayuki Ueda	Y	5
(Japan) Arnage Racing	Mercedes-AMG	Mercedes-AMG GT3	Mercedes-AMG M159 6.2 L V8	50	(Japan) Masaki Kano	Y	All
(Japan) Arnage Racing	Mercedes-AMG	Mercedes-AMG GT3	Mercedes-AMG M159 6.2 L V8	50	(Japan) Hideto Yasuoka	Y	All
(Japan) Arnage Racing	Mercedes-AMG	Mercedes-AMG GT3	Mercedes-AMG M159 6.2 L V8	50	(Japan) Yūya Sakamoto	Y	2
(Japan) Tsuchiya Engineering	Toyota	Toyota 86 MC	GTA V8 4.5 L V8	25	(Japan) Takamitsu Matsui	Y	All
(Japan) Tsuchiya Engineering	Toyota	Toyota 86 MC	GTA V8 4.5 L V8	25	(Japan) Sho Tsuboi	Y	1, 3–8
(Japan) Tsuchiya Engineering	Toyota	Toyota 86 MC	GTA V8 4.5 L V8	25	(Japan) Tsubasa Kondo	Y	2, 5
(Japan) Tsuchiya Engineering	Toyota	Toyota 86 MC	GTA V8 4.5 L V8	25	(Japan) Takeshi Tsuchiya	Y	2
(Japan) Team Taisan	Audi	Audi R8 LMS	Audi DAR 5.2 L V10	26	(Japan) Shinnosuke Yamada	Y	1–3, 5–8
(Japan) Team Taisan	Audi	Audi R8 LMS	Audi DAR 5.2 L V10	26	(Japan) Shintarō Kawabata	Y	1–3, 5–8
(Japan) Team Taisan	Audi	Audi R8 LMS	Audi DAR 5.2 L V10	26	(Japan) Shinji Nakano	Y	2
(Japan) apr	Toyota	Toyota Prius apr GT	Toyota RV8KLM 3.4 L Hybrid V8	30	(Japan) Hiroaki Nagai	Y	All
(Japan) apr	Toyota	Toyota Prius apr GT	Toyota RV8KLM 3.4 L Hybrid V8	30	(Japan) Kota Sasaki	Y	1-5
(Japan) apr	Toyota	Toyota Prius apr GT	Toyota RV8KLM 3.4 L Hybrid V8	30	(Japan) Manabu Orido	Y	6-8
(Japan) apr	Toyota	Toyota Prius apr GT	Toyota RV8KLM 3.4 L Hybrid V8	31	(Japan) Koki Saga	B	All
(Japan) apr	Toyota	Toyota Prius apr GT	Toyota RV8KLM 3.4 L Hybrid V8	31	(Japan) Kohei Hirate	B	All
(Thailand) est cola by AAS Motorsport	Bentley	Bentley Continental GT3 (2016)	Bentley CND 4.0 L Twin Turbo V8	32	(France) Maxime Jousse	M	4
(Thailand) est cola by AAS Motorsport	Bentley	Bentley Continental GT3 (2016)	Bentley CND 4.0 L Twin Turbo V8	32	(Thailand) Kantadhee Kusiri	M	4
(Japan) Modulo Drago Corse	Honda	Honda NSX GT3	Honda JNC1 3.5 L Twin Turbo V6	34	(Japan) Ryō Michigami	Y	All
(Japan) Modulo Drago Corse	Honda	Honda NSX GT3	Honda JNC1 3.5 L Twin Turbo V6	34	(Japan) Hiroki Otsu	Y	All
Arto Panther Team Thailand	Lexus	Lexus RC F GT3	Lexus 2UR-GSE 5.4 L V8	35	(Thailand) Nattavude Charoensukhawatana	Y	All
Arto Panther Team Thailand	Lexus	Lexus RC F GT3	Lexus 2UR-GSE 5.4 L V8	35	(Thailand) Nattapong Horthongkum	Y	All
Arto Panther Team Thailand	Lexus	Lexus RC F GT3	Lexus 2UR-GSE 5.4 L V8	35	(Japan) Koji Yamanishi	Y	5
(Japan) Dijon Racing	Nissan	Nissan GT-R Nismo GT3 (2017)	Nissan VR38DETT 3.8 L Twin Turbo V6	48	(Japan) Masaki Tanaka	Y	1–3, 5–8
(Japan) Dijon Racing	Nissan	Nissan GT-R Nismo GT3 (2017)	Nissan VR38DETT 3.8 L Twin Turbo V6	48	(Japan) Taiyō Iida	Y	1–2, 5
(Japan) Dijon Racing	Nissan	Nissan GT-R Nismo GT3 (2017)	Nissan VR38DETT 3.8 L Twin Turbo V6	48	(United Kingdom) Richard Bradley	Y	2–3, 7–8
(Japan) Dijon Racing	Nissan	Nissan GT-R Nismo GT3 (2017)	Nissan VR38DETT 3.8 L Twin Turbo V6	48	(Japan) Hiroshi Takamori	Y	6
(Japan) Saitama Toyopet GreenBrave	Toyota	Toyota Mark X MC	GTA V8 4.5 L V8	52	(Japan) Taku Bamba	Y	All
(Japan) Saitama Toyopet GreenBrave	Toyota	Toyota Mark X MC	GTA V8 4.5 L V8	52	(Japan) Shigekazu Wakisaka	Y	All
(Japan) Autobacs Racing Team Aguri	BMW	BMW M6 GT3	BMW P63 4.4 L Twin Turbo V8	55	(Japan) Shinichi Takagi	B	All
(Japan) Autobacs Racing Team Aguri	BMW	BMW M6 GT3	BMW P63 4.4 L Twin Turbo V8	55	(United Kingdom) Sean Walkinshaw	B	All
(Japan) LM Corsa	Lexus	Lexus RC F GT3	Lexus 2UR-GSE 5.4 L V8	60	(Japan) Hiroki Yoshimoto	Y	All
(Japan) LM Corsa	Lexus	Lexus RC F GT3	Lexus 2UR-GSE 5.4 L V8	60	(Japan) Ritomo Miyata	Y	All
(Japan) K-tunes Racing LM Corsa	Lexus	Lexus RC F GT3	Lexus 2UR-GSE 5.4 L V8	96	(Japan) Morio Nitta	B	All
(Japan) K-tunes Racing LM Corsa	Lexus	Lexus RC F GT3	Lexus 2UR-GSE 5.4 L V8	96	(Japan) Yuichi Nakayama	B	All
(Japan) R&D Sport	Subaru	Subaru BRZ R&D Sport	Subaru EJ20 2.0 L Turbo F4	61	(Japan) Takuto Iguchi	D	All
(Japan) R&D Sport	Subaru	Subaru BRZ R&D Sport	Subaru EJ20 2.0 L Turbo F4	61	(Japan) Hideki Yamauchi	D	All
(Japan) K2 R&D LEON Racing	Mercedes-AMG	Mercedes-AMG GT3	Mercedes-AMG M159 6.2 L V8	65	(Japan) Haruki Kurosawa	B	All
(Japan) K2 R&D LEON Racing	Mercedes-AMG	Mercedes-AMG GT3	Mercedes-AMG M159 6.2 L V8	65	(Japan) Naoya Gamou	B	All
(Japan) JLOC	Lamborghini	Lamborghini Huracán GT3	Lamborghini DFJ 5.2 L V10	87	(Japan) Kimiya Sato	Y	All
(Japan) JLOC	Lamborghini	Lamborghini Huracán GT3	Lamborghini DFJ 5.2 L V10	87	(Japan) Yuya Motojima	Y	All
(Japan) JLOC	Lamborghini	Lamborghini Huracán GT3	Lamborghini DFJ 5.2 L V10	87	(Japan) Tsubasa Takahashi	Y	2
(Japan) JLOC	Lamborghini	Lamborghini Huracán GT3	Lamborghini DFJ 5.2 L V10	88	(Japan) Kazuki Hiramine	Y	All
(Japan) JLOC	Lamborghini	Lamborghini Huracán GT3	Lamborghini DFJ 5.2 L V10	88	(Italy) Marco Mapelli	Y	1–3, 6–8
(Japan) JLOC	Lamborghini	Lamborghini Huracán GT3	Lamborghini DFJ 5.2 L V10	88	(Italy) Andrea Caldarelli	Y	4
(United Kingdom) EIcars Bentley	Bentley	Bentley Continental GT3	Bentley CND 4.0 L Twin Turbo V8	117	(Japan) Yuji Ide	Y	1–3, 5–8
(United Kingdom) EIcars Bentley	Bentley	Bentley Continental GT3	Bentley CND 4.0 L Twin Turbo V8	117	(Japan) Ryohei Sakaguchi	Y	1–3, 5–8
(United Kingdom) EIcars Bentley	Bentley	Bentley Continental GT3	Bentley CND 4.0 L Twin Turbo V8	117	(France) Jules Gounon	Y	5
(Japan) Tomei Sports	Nissan	Nissan GT-R Nismo GT3 (2017)	Nissan VR38DETT 3.8 L Twin Turbo V6	360	(Japan) Yusaku Shibata	Y	1–2, 5–8
(Japan) Tomei Sports	Nissan	Nissan GT-R Nismo GT3 (2017)	Nissan VR38DETT 3.8 L Twin Turbo V6	360	(Japan) Takayuki Aoki	Y	1–3, 6, 8
(Japan) Tomei Sports	Nissan	Nissan GT-R Nismo GT3 (2017)	Nissan VR38DETT 3.8 L Twin Turbo V6	360	(Japan) Atsushi Tanaka	Y	3, 5, 7
(Japan) Tomei Sports	Nissan	Nissan GT-R Nismo GT3 (2017)	Nissan VR38DETT 3.8 L Twin Turbo V6	360	(Japan) Masataka Yanagida	Y	5
(Japan) CarGuy Racing	Honda	Honda NSX GT3	Honda JNC1 3.5 L Twin Turbo V6	777	(Japan) Naoki Yokomizo	Y	1–3, 5, 7–8
(Japan) CarGuy Racing	Honda	Honda NSX GT3	Honda JNC1 3.5 L Twin Turbo V6	777	(Japan) Takeshi Kimura	Y	1–3, 5, 7–8
(Japan) CarGuy Racing	Honda	Honda NSX GT3	Honda JNC1 3.5 L Twin Turbo V6	777	(Italy) Kei Cozzolino	Y	2

=== Vehicle Changes ===
==== GT300 ====
- Panther Team Thailand switched from the Dome-built Toyota 86 MC to the Lexus RC F GT3.
- GAINER switched to a full-on effort with Nissan, fielding two brand-new 2018 Nissan GT-R NISMO GT3s.
- Arnage Racing separated from INGING Motorsport after one season, and also switch vehicles to the Mercedes-AMG GT3.

=== Entrant changes ===
==== GT500 ====
- Honda:
  - 2009 Formula 1 World Champion Jenson Button, who made his series debut with Team Mugen at the 2017 Suzuka 1000km, will run full-time with Honda and Team Kunimitsu in 2018.
  - Takuya Izawa moves from Team Kunimitsu to Autobacs Racing Team Aguri, replacing Takashi Kobayashi.
- Toyota:
  - Former F1, and current WEC and Super Formula driver Kamui Kobayashi will make his full-time GT500 debut with Lexus Team SARD
  - James Rossiter stepped away from full-time Super GT racing in 2018, but will continue to race in Japan in the Super Formula championship. Yuhi Sekiguchi replaces Rossiter at Lexus Team au TOM's
  - Toyota young driver Kenta Yamashita moves up to GT500 full-time with Lexus Team WedsSport BANDOH, replacing Sekiguchi.
  - Formula E standout Felix Rosenqvist will make his Super GT debut in the GT500 class for Lexus Team Wako's LeMans. Replaces Andrea Caldarelli who confirmed that he would leave Toyota and Super GT this season, focusing solely on his commitments as a factory driver at Lamborghini Squadra Corse.
- Nissan:
  - Reigning All-Japan Formula 3 Champion Mitsunori Takaboshi steps up to GT500 full-time with Kondo Racing, replacing Daiki Sasaki, who moves over to Team Impul to drive the Calsonic GT-R.
  - NDDP Racing moved up to the GT500 class for 2018, entering as NDDP Racing with B-Max. They take the place of MOLA, who withdrew from the series at the end of 2017. Satoshi Motoyama and Katsumasa Chiyo stays to the new team.

==== GT300 ====
- Former GT500 driver Hironobu Yasuda and two-time GT300 champion Kazuki Hoshino move to Gainer, from Team Impul and NDDP Racing respectively, to drive their new Nissan GT-R NISMO GT3s.
- Takashi Kobayashi moves to Team UpGarage, replacing Shintaro Kawabata.
- VivaC Team Tsuchiya reverted to their original name, Tsuchiya Engineering, following the withdrawal of their title sponsor VivaC. Toyota young driver Sho Tsuboi will replace Kenta Yamashita at Tsuchiya Engineering.
- Akira Iida will step away from full-time driving duties, and became team director of the #60 LM Corsa Lexus RC F GT3. Two-time FIA F4 Japanese Champion Ritomo Miyata makes his series debut with LM Corsa.
- The #51 LM Corsa Lexus RC F GT3 changes its number to #96, and has a new title sponsor in Okayama Toyopet / K-Tunes Racing. The team will be officially known as K-Tunes Racing LM Corsa from 2018. Three-time GT300 champion Morio Nitta moves to K-Tunes LM Corsa Lexus RC F GT3 to replace Sho Tsuboi.
- Jono Lester was released from Pacific with Gulf Racing after the 2017 season, and will not return to Super GT in 2018. Pacific with Gulf Racing recruit Rintaro Kubo from apr, and Keishi Ishikawa who moves from Rn-sports. Kyosuke Mineo become the third driver.
- Two-time GT500 champion Kohei Hirate moves out of GT500 to drive the #31 Toyota Prius for apr Racing. And two-time GT300 champion Manabu Orido joined apr Racing midseason to replace Kota Sasaki.
- Drago Corse, who competed from 2015 to 2016 as Drago Modulo Honda Racing, return to the series in GT300 with another Honda NSX GT3. They will be known as Modulo Drago Corse. 2000 GT500 Champion Ryō Michigami returns to the series as a full-time driver owner, after racing in the World Touring Car Championship in 2017. Former All-Japan Formula 3 race winner Hiroki Otsu makes his series debut with Modulo Drago Corse.
- FIA F4 Japanese graduate Yuya Hiraki makes his series debut with Team Mach, replacing Kiyoto Fujinami as Natsu Sakaguchi's co-driver.
- Audi Team Hitotsuyama recruit Ryuichiro Tomita to replace Masataka Yanagida
- Masaki Kano and Hideto Yasuoka both return to the series with Arnage Racing.
- CarGuy Racing makes their Super GT debut with the all-new Honda NSX GT3. They previously competed in the Super Taikyu Series and Blancpain GT Series Asia. Gentleman racer Takeshi Kimura makes his series debut with CarGuy Racing. Naoki Yokomizo, the 2012 GT300 Champion, returns after a year-long hiatus to drive for the new CarGuy Racing team.
- BMW Team Studie, the 2011 GT300 class Champion (by then co-joint with Goodsmile Racing) announced in January that they would switch to the Blancpain GT Series Asia GT4 category, and suspended operations in Super GT for the foreseeable future.
- Bentley factory driver Jules Gounon makes his Super GT debut in a one-off for EIcars Bentley at the Fuji 500-mile race.

== Results ==
Round	Circuit	Date	Class	Pole position	Race winner
1	(Japan) Okayama International Circuit; Report	7–8 April	GT500	No. 17 REAL Racing	No. 17 REAL Racing
1	(Japan) Okayama International Circuit; Report	7–8 April	GT500	(Japan) Koudai Tsukakoshi (Japan) Takashi Kogure	(Japan) Koudai Tsukakoshi (Japan) Takashi Kogure
1	(Japan) Okayama International Circuit; Report	7–8 April	GT300	No. 88 JLOC	No. 18 Team UpGarage
1	(Japan) Okayama International Circuit; Report	7–8 April	GT300	(Japan) Kazuki Hiramine (Italy) Marco Mapelli	(Japan) Yuhki Nakayama (Japan) Takashi Kobayashi
2	(Japan) Fuji Speedway; Report	3–4 May	GT500	No. 38 Lexus Team ZENT Cerumo	No. 23 NISMO
2	(Japan) Fuji Speedway; Report	3–4 May	GT500	(Japan) Yuji Tachikawa (Japan) Hiroaki Ishiura	(Japan) Tsugio Matsuda (Italy) Ronnie Quintarelli
2	(Japan) Fuji Speedway; Report	3–4 May	GT300	No. 55 Autobacs Racing Team Aguri	No. 55 Autobacs Racing Team Aguri
2	(Japan) Fuji Speedway; Report	3–4 May	GT300	(Japan) Shinichi Takagi (United Kingdom) Sean Walkinshaw	(Japan) Shinichi Takagi (United Kingdom) Sean Walkinshaw
3	(Japan) Suzuka Circuit; Report	19–20 May	GT500	No. 8 Autobacs Racing Team Aguri	No. 8 Autobacs Racing Team Aguri
3	(Japan) Suzuka Circuit; Report	19–20 May	GT500	(Japan) Tomoki Nojiri (Japan) Takuya Izawa	(Japan) Tomoki Nojiri (Japan) Takuya Izawa
3	(Japan) Suzuka Circuit; Report	19–20 May	GT300	No. 96 K-Tunes LM Corsa	No. 96 K-Tunes LM Corsa
3	(Japan) Suzuka Circuit; Report	19–20 May	GT300	(Japan) Yuichi Nakayama (Japan) Morio Nitta	(Japan) Yuichi Nakayama (Japan) Morio Nitta
4	(Thailand) Chang International Circuit; Report	30 June-1 July	GT500	No. 16 Team Mugen	No. 39 Lexus Team SARD
4	(Thailand) Chang International Circuit; Report	30 June-1 July	GT500	(Japan) Hideki Mutoh (Japan) Daisuke Nakajima	(Finland) Heikki Kovalainen (Japan) Kamui Kobayashi
4	(Thailand) Chang International Circuit; Report	30 June-1 July	GT300	No. 65 K2 R&D LEON Racing	No. 11 GAINER
4	(Thailand) Chang International Circuit; Report	30 June-1 July	GT300	(Japan) Haruki Kurosawa (Japan) Naoya Gamou	(Japan) Katsuyuki Hiranaka (Japan) Hironobu Yasuda
5	(Japan) Fuji Speedway; Report	4–5 August	GT500	No. 23 NISMO	No. 36 Lexus Team au TOM'S
5	(Japan) Fuji Speedway; Report	4–5 August	GT500	(Japan) Tsugio Matsuda (Italy) Ronnie Quintarelli	(Japan) Kazuki Nakajima (Japan) Yuhi Sekiguchi
5	(Japan) Fuji Speedway; Report	4–5 August	GT300	No. 25 Tsuchiya Engineering	No. 55 Autobacs Racing Team Aguri
5	(Japan) Fuji Speedway; Report	4–5 August	GT300	(Japan) Takamitsu Matsui (Japan) Sho Tsuboi (Japan) Tsubasa Kondo	(Japan) Shinichi Takagi (United Kingdom) Sean Walkinshaw
6	(Japan) Sportsland Sugo; Report	15–16 September	GT500	No. 100 Team Kunimitsu	No. 100 Team Kunimitsu
6	(Japan) Sportsland Sugo; Report	15–16 September	GT500	(United Kingdom) Jenson Button (Japan) Naoki Yamamoto	(United Kingdom) Jenson Button (Japan) Naoki Yamamoto
6	(Japan) Sportsland Sugo; Report	15–16 September	GT300	No. 61 R&D Sport	No. 61 R&D Sport
6	(Japan) Sportsland Sugo; Report	15–16 September	GT300	(Japan) Takuto Iguchi (Japan) Hideki Yamauchi	(Japan) Takuto Iguchi (Japan) Hideki Yamauchi
7	(Japan) Autopolis; Report	20–21 October	GT500	No. 8 Autobacs Racing Team Aguri	No. 1 Lexus Team KeePer TOM'S
7	(Japan) Autopolis; Report	20–21 October	GT500	(Japan) Tomoki Nojiri (Japan) Takuya Izawa	(New Zealand) Nick Cassidy (Japan) Ryō Hirakawa
7	(Japan) Autopolis; Report	20–21 October	GT300	No. 25 Tsuchiya Engineering	No. 96 K-Tunes Racing LM Corsa
7	(Japan) Autopolis; Report	20–21 October	GT300	(Japan) Takamitsu Matsui (Japan) Sho Tsuboi	(Japan) Yuichi Nakayama (Japan) Morio Nitta
8	(Japan) Twin Ring Motegi; Report	10–11 November	GT500	No. 8 Autobacs Racing Team Aguri	No. 8 Autobacs Racing Team Aguri
8	(Japan) Twin Ring Motegi; Report	10–11 November	GT500	(Japan) Tomoki Nojiri (Japan) Takuya Izawa	(Japan) Tomoki Nojiri (Japan) Takuya Izawa
8	(Japan) Twin Ring Motegi; Report	10–11 November	GT300	No. 88 JLOC	No. 65 K2 R&D LEON Racing
8	(Japan) Twin Ring Motegi; Report	10–11 November	GT300	(Japan) Kazuki Hiramine (Italy) Marco Mapelli	(Japan) Haruki Kurosawa (Japan) Naoya Gamou

== Championship standings ==
=== Drivers' championships ===
Scoring system

Position	1st	2nd	3rd	4th	5th	6th	7th	8th	9th	10th	Pole
Points	20	15	11	8	6	5	4	3	2	1	1
Fuji 500 mile	25	18	13	10	8	6	5	4	3	2	1

==== GT500 ====
Driver Ranking GT500 2018 Series
Rank	Driver	Team	OKA (Japan)	FUJ (Japan)	SUZ (Japan)	CHA (Thailand)	FUJ (Japan)	SUG (Japan)	AUT (Japan)	MOT (Japan)	Points
1	(Japan) Naoki Yamamoto (United Kingdom) Jenson Button	(Japan) No. 100 Team Kunimitsu	2	9	2	11	5	1	5	3	78
2	(Japan) Ryō Hirakawa (New Zealand) Nick Cassidy	(Japan) No. 1 Lexus Team KeePer TOM'S	3	7	3	8	2	14	1	4	75
3	(Japan) Tomoki Nojiri (Japan) Takuya Izawa	(Japan) No. 8 Autobacs Racing Team Aguri	11	8	1	Ret	4	2	12	1	71
4	(Japan) Yuji Tachikawa (Japan) Hiroaki Ishiura	(Japan) No. 38 Lexus Team ZENT Cerumo	8	3	8	4	8	5	4	2	59
5	(Japan) Yuhi Sekiguchi	(Japan) No. 36 Lexus Team au TOM'S	13	4	5	10	1	12	2	13	55
6	(Japan) Kazuki Nakajima	(Japan) No. 36 Lexus Team au TOM'S	13		5	10	1	12	2	13	47
7	(Japan) Koudai Tsukakoshi (Japan) Takashi Kogure	(Japan) No. 17 REAL Racing	1	11	11	7	3	9	6	15	45
8	(Japan) Tsugio Matsuda (Italy) Ronnie Quintarelli	(Japan) No. 23 NISMO	5	1	6	12	9	7	15	7	43
9	(Finland) Heikki Kovalainen	(Japan) No. 39 Lexus Team SARD	12	2	Ret	1	11	10	8	8	42
10	(Japan) Kazuya Oshima	(Japan) No. 6 Lexus Team LeMans Wako's	4	5	12	2	7	11	9	6	41
10	(Sweden) Felix Rosenqvist	(Japan) No. 6 Lexus Team LeMans Wako's	4	5		2	7	11	9	6	41
11	(Japan) Yuji Kunimoto (Japan) Kenta Yamashita	(Japan) No. 19 Lexus Team WedsSport Bandoh	9	12	13	3	10	Ret	3	5	32
12	(Japan) Daiki Sasaki (United Kingdom) Jann Mardenborough	(Japan) No. 12 Team Impul	14	6	4	6	12	3	11	11	29
13	(Japan) Kamui Kobayashi	(Japan) No. 39 Lexus Team SARD	12		Ret	1	11	10	8	8	27
14	(Brazil) Joao Paulo de Oliveira (Japan) Mitsunori Takaboshi	(Japan) No. 24 Kondo Racing	6	13	9	Ret	6	6	7	10	23
15	(Japan) Hideki Mutoh (Japan) Daisuke Nakajima	(Japan) No. 16 Team Mugen	10	14	Ret	5	14	4	14	14	16
16	(Japan) Sho Tsuboi	(Japan) No. 39 Lexus Team SARD		2							15
17	(Japan) Satoshi Motoyama (Japan) Katsumasa Chiyo	(Japan) No. 3 NDDP by B-Max Racing	7	10	7	13	15	8	13	9	14
18	(United Kingdom) James Rossiter	(Japan) No. 6 Lexus Team LeMans Wako's		4	12						8
19	(Belgium) Bertrand Baguette (Japan) Kosuke Matsuura	(Japan) No. 64 Nakajima Racing	15	Ret	10	9	13	13	10	12	4
Rank	Driver	Team	OKA (Japan)	FUJ (Japan)	SUZ (Japan)	CHA (Thailand)	FUJ (Japan)	SUG (Japan)	AUT (Japan)	MOT (Japan)	Points

Colour	Result
Gold	Winner
Silver	Second place
Bronze	Third place
Green	Points classification
Blue	Non-points classification
Blue	Non-classified finish (NC)
Purple	Retired, not classified (Ret)
Red	Did not qualify (DNQ)
Red	Did not pre-qualify (DNPQ)
Black	Disqualified (DSQ)
White	Did not start (DNS)
White	Withdrew (WD)
White	Race cancelled (C)
Blank	Did not practice (DNP)
Blank	Did not arrive (DNA)
Blank	Excluded (EX)

==== GT300 ====
Driver Ranking GT300 2018 Series
Rank	Driver	Team	OKA (Japan)	FUJ (Japan)	SUZ (Japan)	CHA (Thailand)	FUJ (Japan)	SUG (Japan)	AUT (Japan)	MOT (Japan)	Points
1	(Japan) Haruki Kurosawa (Japan) Naoya Gamou	(Japan) No. 65 K2 R&D LEON Racing	4	4	7	4	4	8	5	1	68
2	(Japan) Shinichi Takagi (United Kingdom) Sean Walkinshaw	(Japan) No. 55 ARTA	6	1	20	11	1	10	4	9	62
3	(Japan) Koki Saga (Japan) Kohei Hirate	(Japan) No. 31 apr	Ret	2	9	2	3	25	10	2	61
4	(Japan) Nobuteru Taniguchi (Japan) Tatsuya Kataoka	(Japan) No. 0 Goodsmile Racing with Team Ukyo	8	5	8	7	2	3	19	3	56
5	(Japan) Katsuyuki Hiranaka (Japan) Hironobu Yasuda	(Japan) No. 11 GAINER	5	3	16	1	22	19	6	5	48
6	(Japan) Morio Nitta (Japan) Yuichi Nakayama	(Japan) No.96 K-tunes Racing LM Corsa	14	14	1	10	10	14	1	10	45
7	(Japan) Takamitsu Matsui	(Japan) No. 25 Tsuchiya Engineering	3	Ret	2	19	5	24	24	8	39
7	(Japan) Sho Tsuboi	(Japan) No. 25 Tsuchiya Engineering	3		2	19	5	24	24	8	39
8	(Japan) Takuto Iguchi (Japan) Hideki Yamauchi	(Japan) No. 61 R&D Sport	18	Ret	3	Ret	Ret	1	15	6	37
9	(Japan) Tomonobu Fujii (Germany) Sven Müller	(Japan) No. 7 D'station Racing	2	6	11	8	7	12	8	7	35
10	(Japan) Kazuki Hiramine	(Japan) No. 88 JLOC	7	9	4	6	6	5	13	27	33
11	(Japan) Kimiya Sato (Japan) Yuya Motojima	(Japan) No. 87 JLOC	12	16	12	5	Ret	13	2	4	29
12	(Japan) Yuhki Nakayama (Japan) Takashi Kobayshi	(Japan) No. 18 Team UpGarage	1	13	6	18	9	11	27	Ret	28
13	(Italy) Marco Mapelli	(Japan) No. 88 JLOC	7	9	4		6	5	13	27	28
14	(Japan) Ryō Michigami (Japan) Hiroki Otsu	(Japan) No. 34 Modulo Drago Corse	Ret	8	26	9	DNS	4	3	14	24
15	(Japan) Ritomo Miyata (Japan) Hiroki Yoshimoto	(Japan) No. 60 LM Corsa	17	7	5	3	Ret	9	12	24	23
16	(Japan) Kazuki Hoshino (Japan) Hiroki Yoshida	(Japan) No. 10 GAINER	13	11	10	Ret	8	2	9	15	22
17	(Japan) Rintaro Kubo (Japan) Keishi Ishikawa	(Japan) No. 9 Pacific with Gulf Racing	16	17	15	16	15	6	11	12	5
18	(Italy) Andrea Caldarelli	(Japan) No. JLOC				6					5
19	(Japan) Taku Bamba (Japan) Shigekazu Wakisaka	(Japan) No. 52 Saitama Toyopet GreenBrave	11	19	14	17	Ret	7	17	13	4
20	(Japan) Natsu Sakaguchi (Japan) Yuya Hiraki	(Japan) No. 5 Team Mach	Ret	12	Ret		19	22	7	18	4
21	(Japan) Shintaro Kawabata (Japan) Shinnosuke Yamada	(Japan) No. 26 Team Taisan	9	15	28		Ret	20	20	16	2
22	(United Kingdom) Richard Lyons (Japan) Ryuichiro Tomita	(Japan) No. 21 Audi Team Hitotsuyama	Ret	10	23	Ret	14	23	14	11	1
23	(Japan) Masaki Kano (Japan) Hideto Yasuoka	(Japan) No. 50 Arnage Racing	10	20	19	13	11	17	16	20	1
24	(Japan) Tsubasa Kondo	(Japan) No. 25 Tsuchiya Engineering		Ret			5				1
-	(Japan) Takuro Shinohara	(Japan) No. 21 Audi Team Hitotsuyama		10 (Note: Takuro Shinohara did not run during the race as a third driver and was ineligible for championship points.)			14				0
-	(Japan) Yuya Sakamoto	(Japan) No. 50 Arnage Racing		20			11				0
-	(Japan) Kazuho Takahashi (Japan) Hiroki Katoh	(Japan) No. 2 Cars Tokai Dream28	23	23	13	12	20	Ret	21	22	0
-	(Japan) Yusaku Shibata	(Japan) No. 360 Tomei Sports	Ret				12	Ret	23	17	0
-	(Japan) Takayuki Aoki	(Japan) No. 360 Tomei Sports	Ret	Ret	27		12	Ret		17	0
-	(Japan) Masataka Yanagida	(Japan) No. 360 Tomei Sports					12				0
-	(Japan) Tetsuji Tamanaka	(Japan) No. 5 Team Mach		12							0
-	(Japan) Yuji Ide (Japan) Ryohei Sakaguchi	(Japan) No. 117 EIcars Bentley	21	22	18		13	15	18	19	0
-	(France) Jules Gounon	(United Kingdom) No. 117 EIcars Bentley					13				0
-	(France) Maxime Jousse (Thailand) Kantadhee Kusiri	(Thailand) No. 32 est cola by AAS Motorsport				14					0
-	(Thailand) Nattavude Charoensukhawatana (Thailand) Nattapong Horthongkum	No. 35 Arto Panther Team Thailand	24	24	24	15	16	18	22	25	0
-	(Japan) Takeshi Kimura (Japan) Naoki Yokomizo	(Japan) No. CarGuy Racing	15	26	21		17		Ret	23	0
-	(Japan) Kyosuke Mineo	(Japan) No. 9 Pacific with Gulf Racing					15				0
-	(Japan) Shinji Nakano	(Japan) No. 26 Team Taisan		15			Ret				0
-	(Japan) Hiroaki Nagai	(Japan) No. 30 apr	20	18	17	Ret	Ret	16	26	21	0
-	(Japan) Manabu Orido	(Japan) No. 30 apr					Ret	16	26	21	0
-	(Japan) Koji Yamanishi	(Japan) No. 35 Arto Panther Team Thailand					16				0
-	(Japan) Tsubasa Takahashi	(Japan) No. 87 JLOC		16			Ret				0
-	(Japan) Kota Sasaki	(Japan) No. 30 apr	20	18	17	Ret	Ret				0
-	(Japan) Masaki Tanaka	(Japan) No. 48 Dijon Racing	22	21	22		18	21	28	26	0
-	(United Kingdom) Richard Bradley	(Japan) No. 48 Dijon Racing		21	22		18		28	26	0
-	(Japan) Taiyou Iida	(Japan) No. 48 Dijon Racing	22	21			18				0
-	(Japan) Masaki Jyonai (Japan) Hisashi Wada	(Japan) No. 22 R'Qs Motor Sports	19	25	25		21		25	28	0
-	(Japan) Kiyoto Fujinami	(Japan) No. 5 Team Mach					19				0
-	(Japan) Masayuki Ueda	(Japan) No. 22 R'Qs Motor Sports					21				0
-	(Japan) Hiroshi Takamori	(Japan) No. 48 Dijon Racing						21			0
-	(Japan) Atsushi Tanaka	(Japan) No. 360 Tomei Sports		Ret	27				23		0
-	(Italy) Kei Cozzolino	(Japan) No. 777 CarGuy Racing		26							0
-	(Japan) Takeshi Tsuchiya	(Japan) No. 25 Tsuchiya Engineering		Ret							0
Rank	Driver	Team	OKA (Japan)	FUJ (Japan)	SUZ (Japan)	CHA (Thailand)	FUJ (Japan)	SUG (Japan)	AUT (Japan)	MOT (Japan)	Points
