= Ryo Hirakawa =

Japanese racing driver (born 1994)

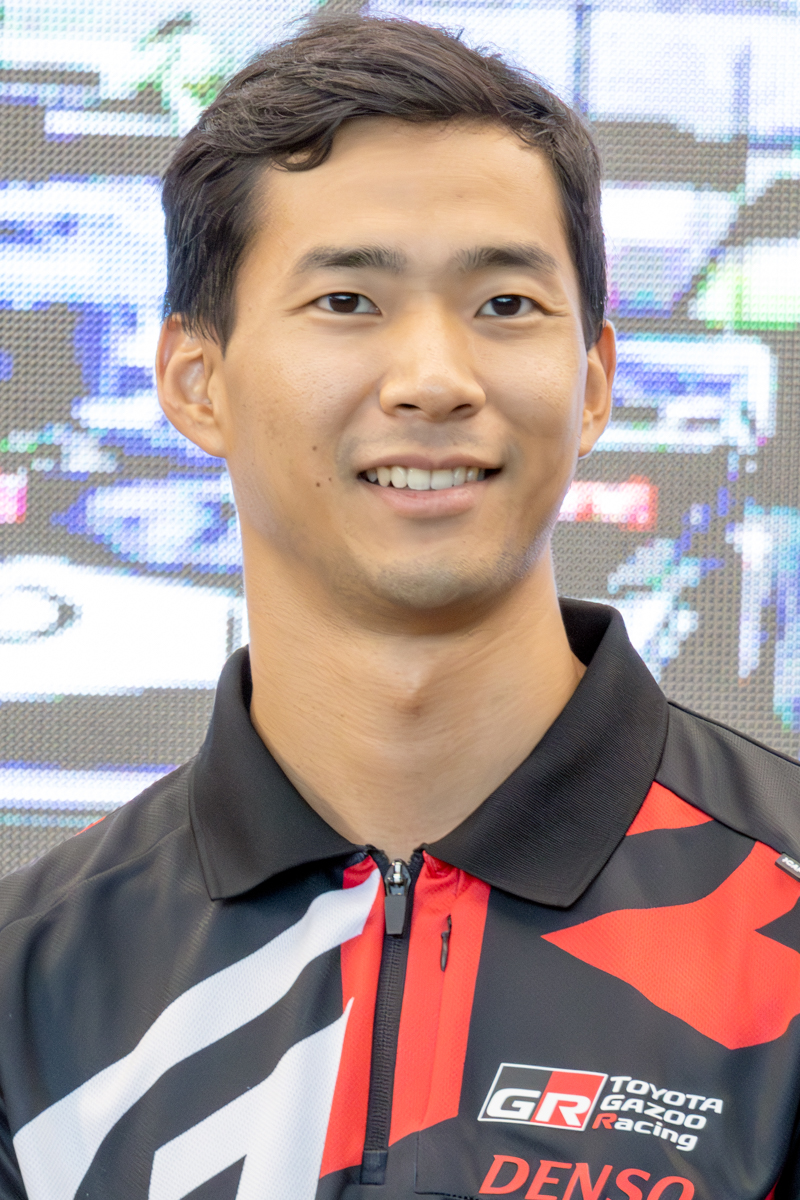
- Hirakawa at the 2024 6 Hours of Fuji
- Born: 7 March 1994 (age 32) Kure, Hiroshima, Japan

FIA World Endurance Championship career
- Debut season: 2022
- Current team: Toyota Racing GmbH
- Categorisation: FIA Gold (2013–2021); FIA Platinum (2022–)
- Car number: 8
- Starts: 39
- Championships: 3 (2022, 2023, 2026)
- Wins: 9
- Poles: 5
- Best finish: 1st in 2022, 2023, 2026 (HY)

Formula One World Championship career
- Nationality: (Japan) Japanese
- 2026 team: Haas-Ferrari
- Car number: 50
- Entries: 1 (1 start)
- Championships: 0
- Wins: 0
- Podiums: 0
- Career points: 1
- Pole positions: 0
- Fastest laps: 0
- First entry: 2026 Mexico City Grand Prix
- Last entry: 2026 Mexico City Grand Prix

Super Formula career
- Debut season: 2013
- Former teams: Team LeMans, Team Impul
- Starts: 71
- Championships: 0
- Wins: 4
- Podiums: 14
- Poles: 4
- Fastest laps: 5
- Best finish: 2nd in 2020

Super GT career
- Debut season: 2013
- Former teams: TOM'S
- Starts: 58
- Championships: 1 (2017)
- Wins: 7
- Podiums: 21
- Poles: 7
- Fastest laps: 5
- Best finish: 1st in 2017 (GT500)

24 Hours of Le Mans career
- Years: 2016–2017, 2022–
- Teams: TDS, G-Drive, Toyota
- Best finish: 1st (2022)
- Class wins: 1 (2022)

Previous series
- 2012 2010–12 2010: Japanese F3; Formula Challenge Japan; Formula BMW Pacific

Championship titles
- 2012 2012: Japanese F3; Porsche Carrera Cup Japan

Ryo Hirakawa (Japanese: 平川 亮, Hepburn: Hirakawa Ryō; born 7 March 1994) is a Japanese racing driver who competes in the FIA World Endurance Championship for Toyota Racing, and serves as a reserve driver in Formula One for Haas.

Born in Kure, Hirakawa began competitive kart racing aged thirteen, racing in various local series, including winning the All-Japan Junior Kart Championship in 2008. Graduating to junior formulae in 2010, he won the Super FJ Okayama Series that same year; successive championships won from the JAF Japan F4 West Series in 2011 and the Japanese Formula 3 Championship in 2012 earned him a promotion to Super Formula in 2013 with Team LeMans. Hirakawa debuted in sports car racing in 2012 after earning a scholarship from Porsche, winning that year's Porsche Carrera Cup Japan title. He debuted in Super GT two years later in 2014 with TOM'S.

A graduate of the TGR Driver Challenge Program, he won the Super GT GT500 class championship in 2017 and finished runner-up in Super Formula in 2020. Hirakawa is a three-time Hypercar class champion in the FIA World Endurance Championship; he has raced in the series since 2022 with Toyota, winning the 24 Hours of Le Mans in his debut season and the championship title in 2022, 2023, and 2026 alongside co-drivers Sébastien Buemi and Brendon Hartley. He made his Formula One Grand Prix debut at the 2026 Mexico City Grand Prix for Haas, scoring a points finish.

== Early career ==
Hirakawa began his racing career in karting at the age of thirteen and raced in various local championships. In just his second year of karting, he won the 2008 All-Japan Junior Kart Championship, before progressing to the KF2 category in 2009, where he finished third in the All-Japan Kart Championship and 32nd in the Asia-Pacific Championship.

After graduating from the Formula Toyota Racing School, Hirakawa graduated to single-seaters in 2010, competing primarily in the Formula Challenge Japan series. In his first season, he finished sixth in the series standings, finishing on the podium two times in eleven races. He won his first race in the Super FJ category, and won the JAF Regional Championship Super FJ Okayama Series title at 16 years, 8 months of age. Hirakawa also contested the final three rounds in the 2010 Formula BMW Pacific season, as a guest driver. He recorded a best finish of fourth place at Okayama.

Hirakawa remained in Formula Challenge Japan for 2011, winning his first race in the sixth round at Fuji Speedway. He finished the year second in the championship standings behind future Toyota Gazoo Racing WRT driver Takamoto Katsuta. That same year, Hirakawa won the JAF Formula 4 West Series Championship, becoming the youngest champion at 17 years, 8 months of age. In 2012, Hirakawa competed for a third season in Formula Challenge Japan, and simultaneously stepped up to the All-Japan Formula Three Championship with Team RSS, as well as the Porsche Carrera Cup Japan with a Porsche junior scholarship.

Hirakawa won his debut race in Japanese F3, and seven of the first nine races of the season, en route to clinching the championship at the twelfth round in Sportsland Sugo. After the Japanese F3 season concluded, Hirakawa made his debut in the Macau Grand Prix with RSS, qualifying 24th and retiring from the race due to a collision. In Porsche Carrera Cup Japan, Hirakawa won seven consecutive races, and clinched the series championship with two races remaining. He became the youngest ever champion in Japanese F3 and Carrera Cup Japan, at 18 years of age. And in his third FCJ season, Hirakawa won five races, and finished second in the championship to Nobuharu Matsushita, after both drivers finished with the same number of points and race wins.

== Super Formula and Super GT career ==
=== Super Formula ===
==== 2013–2015 ====
Hirakawa joined the Toyota Young Driver Program (TDP) and made his Super Formula Championship debut in 2013 with the Toyota-powered Team LeMans. At 19 years of age, Hirakawa was the youngest driver in the championship. He finished his debut season 11th in the championship standings, with a best finish of fourth at the double-header finale at Suzuka Circuit. That same year, Hirakawa tested an IndyCar for Dale Coyne Racing at Sonoma Raceway.

In 2014, Hirakawa scored his first Super Formula podium finish in the 13 July race at Fuji Speedway, finishing second after running off track while leading on the final lap. Kazuki Nakajima claimed the race victory. Hirakawa improved to eighth in the championship. Hirakawa remained at Team LeMans for 2015, joined by ex-Formula One driver Kamui Kobayashi. Hirakawa finished eighth in the championship for the second consecutive season, recording five top-eight finishes.

==== 2018–present ====
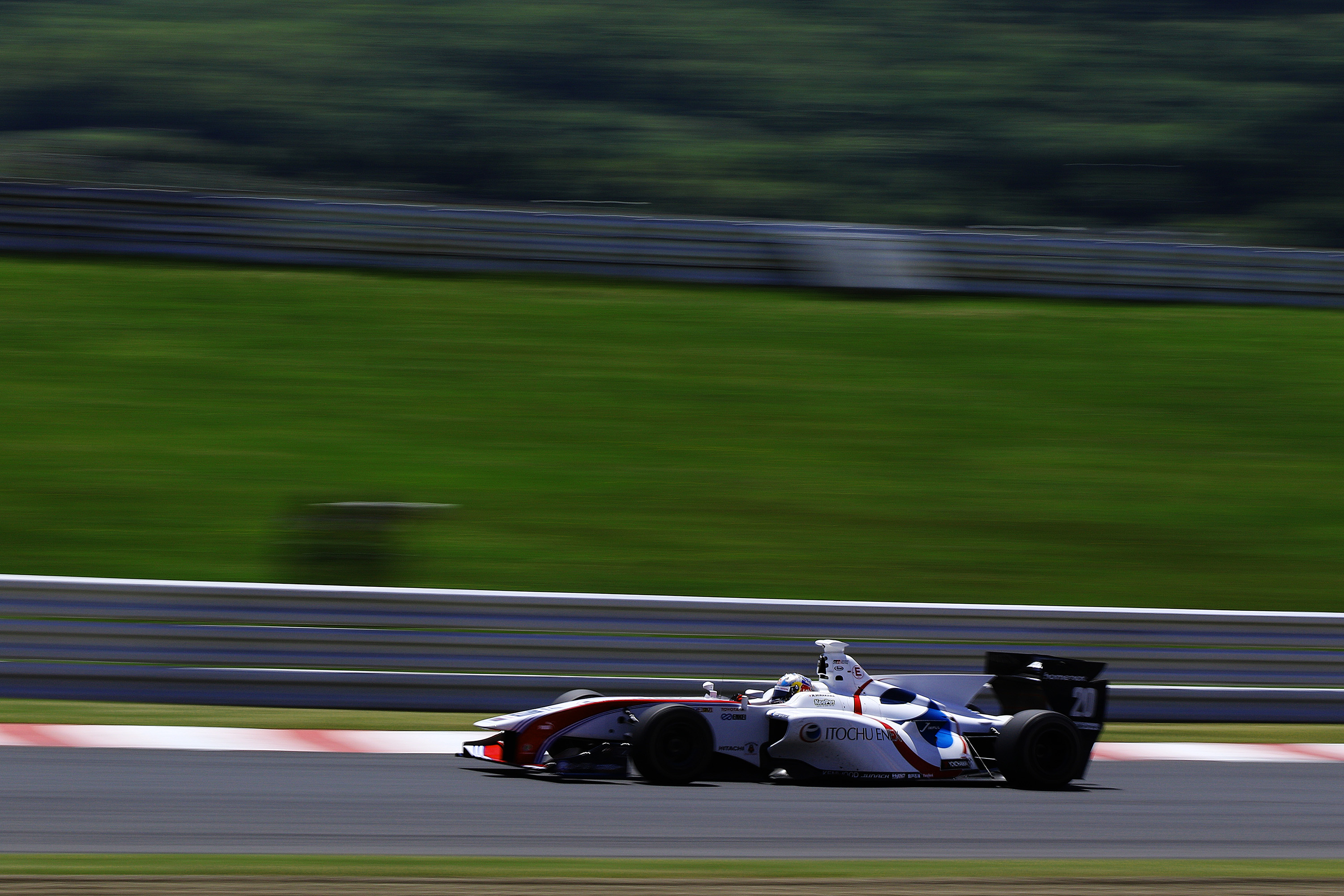
Hirakawa driving for Team Impul at Autopolis in 2018, where he took his first Super Formula pole position.

After two seasons away from the series, Hirakawa rejoined the Super Formula grid in 2018, driving for Team Impul alongside Yuhi Sekiguchi. He won his first pole position at the second round in Autopolis, but the race was cancelled due to heavy rain and fog. He went on to record consecutive podium finishes at Motegi and Okayama, and finished a career-best fifth in the drivers' championship. In the fifth round of the 2019 season, Hirakawa scored his first career victory at Motegi. Despite the breakthrough victory, he failed to score points in five out of the first six races, and dropped to tenth in the championship standings.

The start of the 2020 season was delayed until September due to the effects of the COVID-19 pandemic, but Hirakawa won the first race of the season from pole at Motegi. He finished fourth and second in the following races at Okayama and Sugo, respectively, to build an early points lead. But after two consecutive non-scoring results, Hirakawa conceded the points lead, and would finish runner-up in the championship to Naoki Yamamoto by just two points.

Hirakawa failed to win a race in 2021, but scored two second place finishes at Suzuka and finished fourth in the championship, helping Team Impul win the teams' title. He began the 2022 season by winning the opening round at Fuji, and the fourth round at Autopolis. He went on to finish third in the drivers' championship.

=== Super GT ===
==== 2014–2016 ====
Hirakawa made his Super GT debut in 2014 with Lexus team TOM'S, substituting for Kazuki Nakajima in the team's No. 36 car for two races as Nakajima fulfilled commitments for Toyota in the World Endurance Championship. He recorded top-ten finishes in his two races at Fuji and Autopolis.

Hirakawa made his full-time debut in 2015 for TOM'S, driving the No. 37 KeePer-sponsored car alongside Andrea Caldarelli. He won his first race in just his third career start at Okayama, then won again in the season finale at Motegi. Hirakawa and Caldarelli finished fifth in the championship. Hirakawa would be joined by James Rossiter for the 2016 season. They recorded podium finishes in the first two rounds of the season, but finished ninth in the drivers' championship.

==== 2017–2019 ====
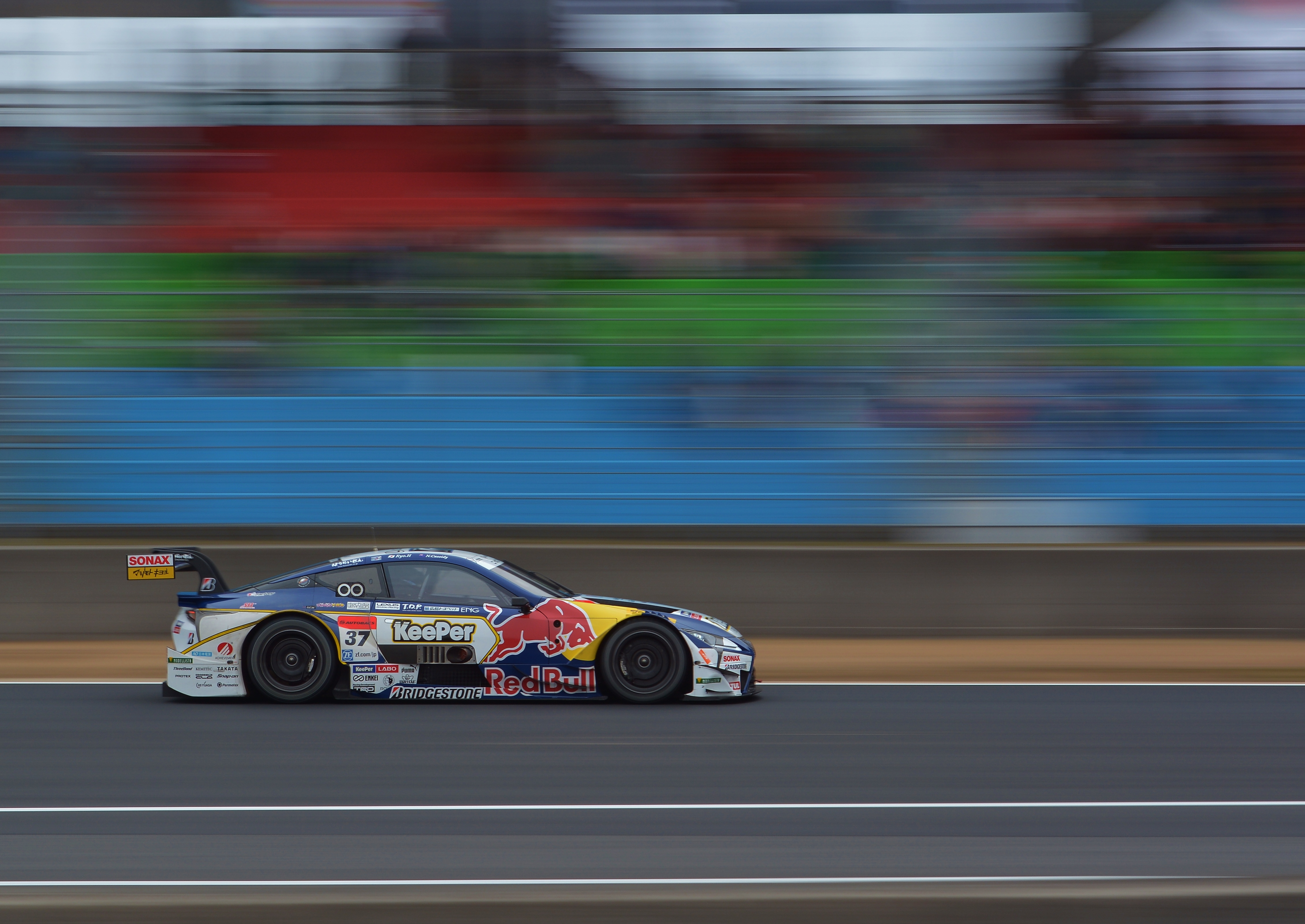
Hirakawa became the youngest Japanese-born GT500 champion aboard the Lexus LC500 GT500 of TOM'S in 2017.

For 2017, Toyota changed models to the new Lexus LC 500, and Hirakawa was joined at the No. 37 TOM'S car by Nick Cassidy. The duo of Hirakawa and Cassidy won the opening round at Okayama, leading an all-Lexus sweep of the top six positions. They won again from pole position in the penultimate round at Chang International Circuit in Thailand, before clinching the GT500 championship with a second-place finish at the finale at Motegi. Hirakawa and Cassidy finished the year with four podiums, and a perfect record of eight points-paying finishes. At 23 years of age, both Hirakawa and Cassidy became the youngest GT500 champions in series history, with Hirakawa holding the record for the youngest Japanese born GT500 champion.

Hirakawa and Cassidy would seek to defend their championships in 2018, but faced strong competition from an improved Honda fleet led by Team Kunimitsu and their drivers, Naoki Yamamoto and newcomer Jenson Button. The reigning champions won the penultimate round in Autopolis, but fell short of the championship by three points, as Team Kunimitsu, Yamamoto, and Button won their first titles.

In 2019, Hirakawa and Cassidy once again finished second in the drivers' championship, just two points behind manufacturer stablemates Kazuya Oshima and Kenta Yamashita at Team LeMans. But the No. 37 TOM'S crew were able to win the teams' championship by one point over Team LeMans, after another strong season for Hirakawa and Cassidy that saw them win the final round at Motegi, and record another four podium finishes. That same year, Hirakawa appeared at the 2019 DTM season finale at the Hockenheimring, finishing 13th in the weekend's first race. He finished eighth during the second Super GT x DTM Dream Race at Fuji Speedway on 24 November.

==== 2020–2021 ====
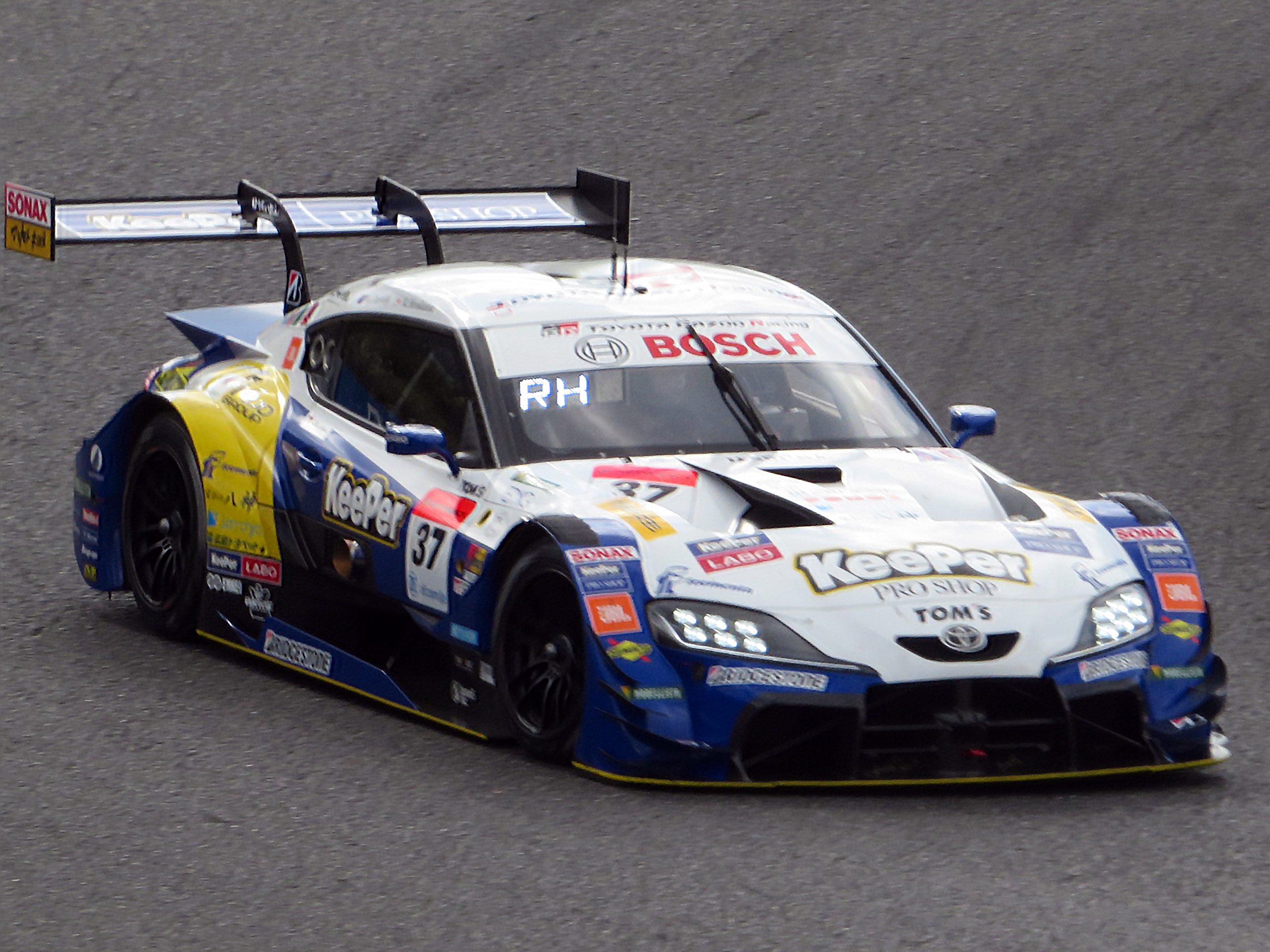
Hirakawa missed out on the 2020 title after running out of fuel on the final corner of the final lap of the final race of the season.

The start of the 2020 Super GT season was delayed until July due to the COVID-19 pandemic. Hirakawa and Cassidy won the opening round at Fuji Speedway from pole position, giving the new Toyota GR Supra GT500 a win in its debut race. After retiring from the sixth round at Suzuka due to a pit entry collision, Cassidy left the series in order to focus on his new role as a driver for Envision Virgin Racing in Formula E. Hirakawa and his new co-driver Kenta Yamashita won pole for the final round at Fuji Speedway. They led the majority of the race, with Hirakawa in position to win the championship, but increasingly faced pressure from Naoki Yamamoto in the latter stages of the race. Hirakawa ran out of fuel on the final corner of the final lap, allowing Yamamoto to overtake him to win the race and the championship alongside new Team Kunimitsu co-driver Tadasuke Makino. Hirakawa coasted to a second-place finish, and again missed out on a second championship by just two points.

Hirakawa was meant to drive the 2021 season alongside Sacha Fenestraz, but Fenestraz's ongoing visa issues meant that Sena Sakaguchi would drive in his place for the first five rounds. Hirakawa and Sakaguchi finished on the podium in the first two rounds at Okayama and Fuji. Fenestraz returned for the sixth round at Autopolis, and the duo finished second in the final round at Fuji Speedway. Hirakawa finished the year seventh in the drivers' championship.

== Prototype career ==
=== European Le Mans Series (2016–2017) ===
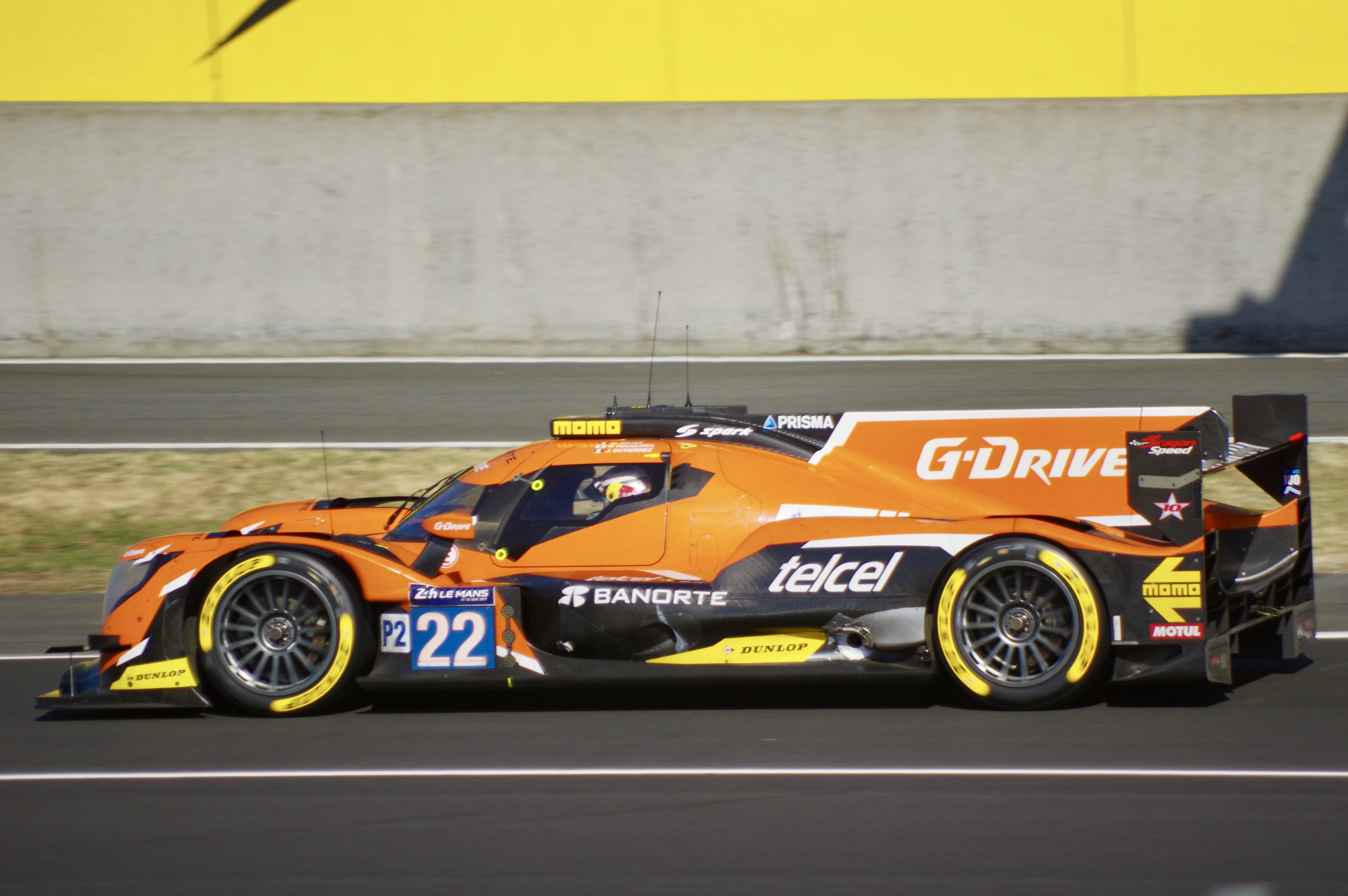
Hirakawa at the 2017 24 Hours of Le Mans.

On 4 February 2016, Toyota Gazoo Racing announced that Hirakawa would be competing in the LMP2 class of the European Le Mans Series. On 4 March, Hirakawa was confirmed as the third driver at Thiriet by TDS Racing alongside Pierre Thiriet and Mathias Beche. He won his first race in the ELMS at the 2016 4 Hours of Imola on 15 May, then won the following 4 Hours of Red Bull Ring on 17 July. He also competed in the 24 Hours of Le Mans for the first time in 2016, and was in contention for an LMP2 class podium finish before Thiriet suffered an accident early in the morning on Sunday.

For 2017, Hirakawa joined the number 22 G-Drive Racing entry operated by DragonSpeed, partnering Memo Rojas and Léo Roussel. The trio won the second round, the 4 Hours of Monza, on 14 May, and the G-Drive/DragonSpeed team won the LMP2 Teams' championship that season.

=== FIA World Endurance Championship (2022–present) ===
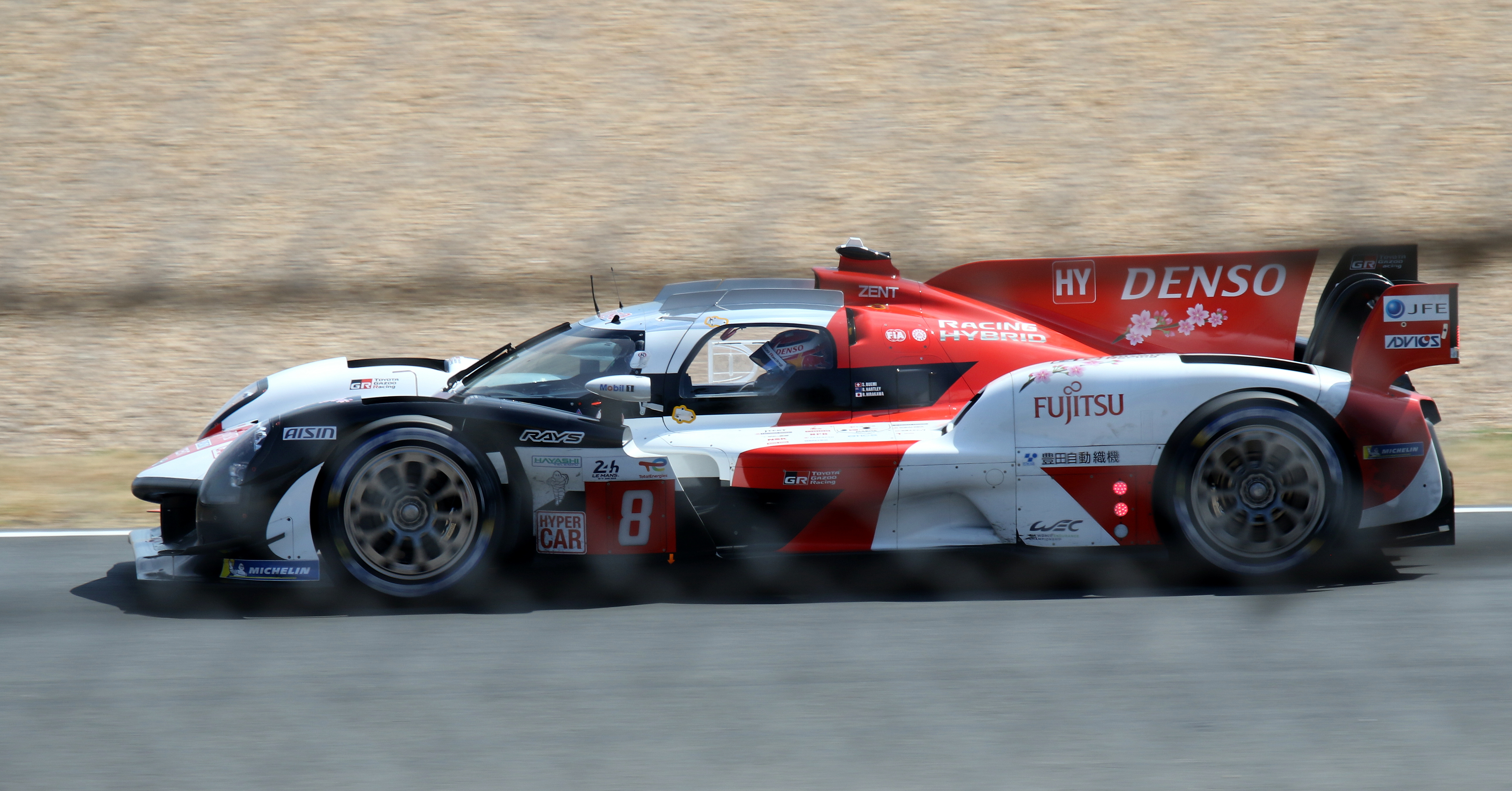
Hirakawa driving the No. 8 GR010 Hybrid at the 2023 24 Hours of Le Mans where the car finished second.

On 7 December 2021, Hirakawa was announced as a driver of the No. 8 Toyota GR010 Hybrid in the 2022 FIA World Endurance Championship, partnering veteran drivers Sébastien Buemi and Brendon Hartley. He replaced Kazuki Nakajima, who took on a managerial role at Toyota Gazoo Racing after retiring from driving. In his debut for the factory Hypercar team, Hirakawa scored his first career podium at the 1000 Miles of Sebring. After a technical issue at Spa resulted in a retirement, the No. 8 car won the 24 Hours of Le Mans. In his first time challenging for the overall victory, Hirakawa became only the sixth Japanese driver to win a leg of the Triple Crown of Motorsport, succeeding fellow Le Mans winners Masanori Sekiya, Seiji Ara, Kamui Kobayashi, and Nakajima, and Indianapolis 500 winner Takuma Sato.

After finishing second at Monza, winning the 6 Hours of Fuji, and finishing second again in Bahrain, Hirakawa won the Hypercar World Endurance Drivers' Championship. He succeeded Nakajima, Kobayashi, and Toshihiro Arai as the fourth Japanese driver to win an FIA-sanctioned world championship.

Hirakawa returned to partner Buemi and Hartley in 2023. They started out with another second place at Sebring, before winning at Portimão when the sister car had a technial issue. Hirakawa and his teammates started from the back at Spa following a crash for Hartley in qualifying, but recovered to second by the end. They then finished second at the Centenary 24 Hours of Le Mans, where Hirakawa spun into the wall at Arnage during the penultimate hour while chasing the No. 51 Ferrari; the team had been battling brake problems in the final hours. After placing sixth in Monza following a post-race penalty, Hirakawa charged up to the lead during the middle stints at Fuji, before team orders forced Hartley to cede first position to teammate Kobayashi in the fifth hour. The No. 8 dominated the season finale at Bahrain, earning the crew a second successive championship title.

At the 2024 season opener in Qatar, the No. 8 crew finished fifth; they placed fifth again in round two at Imola. Sixth place at Spa was followed by another fifth place at Le Mans. Hirakawa and his teammates dominated the 6 Hours of São Paulo, winning by over a minute. A collision penalty for Buemi caused the No. 8 to finish outside the points in Austin, before the team finished tenth at Fuji. Thanks to a charging final stint from Buemi in Bahrain, the No. 8 team won the race and earned Toyota their fourth manufacturers' championship in the hypercar class.

Hirakawa and Toyota suffered a step back in 2025, with just one podium finish, a second place in Bahrain to close out the season. The No. 8 crew finished seventh in the drivers' standings.

Driving the redesigned No. 8 Toyota TR010 Hybrid in 2026, Hirakawa, Buemi, and Hartley won the car's first-ever race at the 6 Hours of Imola. A badly-timed pit stop caused the trio to fall down the order at Spa, before climbing back to tenth at the end. Hirakawa and his team battled for the lead throughout the 24 Hours of Le Mans, though the No. 8 was held back with a drive-through penalty Hirakawa earned with a full-course yellow infringement. The No. 8 later lost the lead to the sister car due to a longer stop; after further battles, Hirakawa and his teammates placed third overall. A difficult race in São Paulo followed, as the Toyota crews failed to score. They finished sixth in Austin. At Fuji, Hirakawa shuffled into the lead ahead of the final restart by not taking tyres at the final pit stop. He managed to hold off the Alpine of Victor Martins, who was on fresher tyres, taking the race win and championship lead. They extended their championship advantage at Barcelona by winning dominantly.

== Formula One ==
=== McLaren (2023–2024) ===
In September 2023, McLaren announced that Hirakawa had joined the McLaren Driver Development Programme and would be the team's reserve driver for the 2024 season. On 12 October 2023, Hirakawa tested Formula One machinery for the first time, driving the team's 2021-spec MCL35M at the Circuit de Barcelona-Catalunya alongside Pato O'Ward.

Hirakawa made his debut in a Formula One race weekend at the 2024 Abu Dhabi Grand Prix, driving the McLaren MCL38 in the first practice session in place of Oscar Piastri. Hirakawa also participated in the post-season test in Abu Dhabi for Haas due to his links with Toyota. Hirakawa was paired with Esteban Ocon in order to fulfill FIA requirements for Young Driver participation (those with two or fewer F1 starts) as Oliver Bearman was ineligible after competing in three Grand Prix events in 2024.

=== Alpine (2025) ===
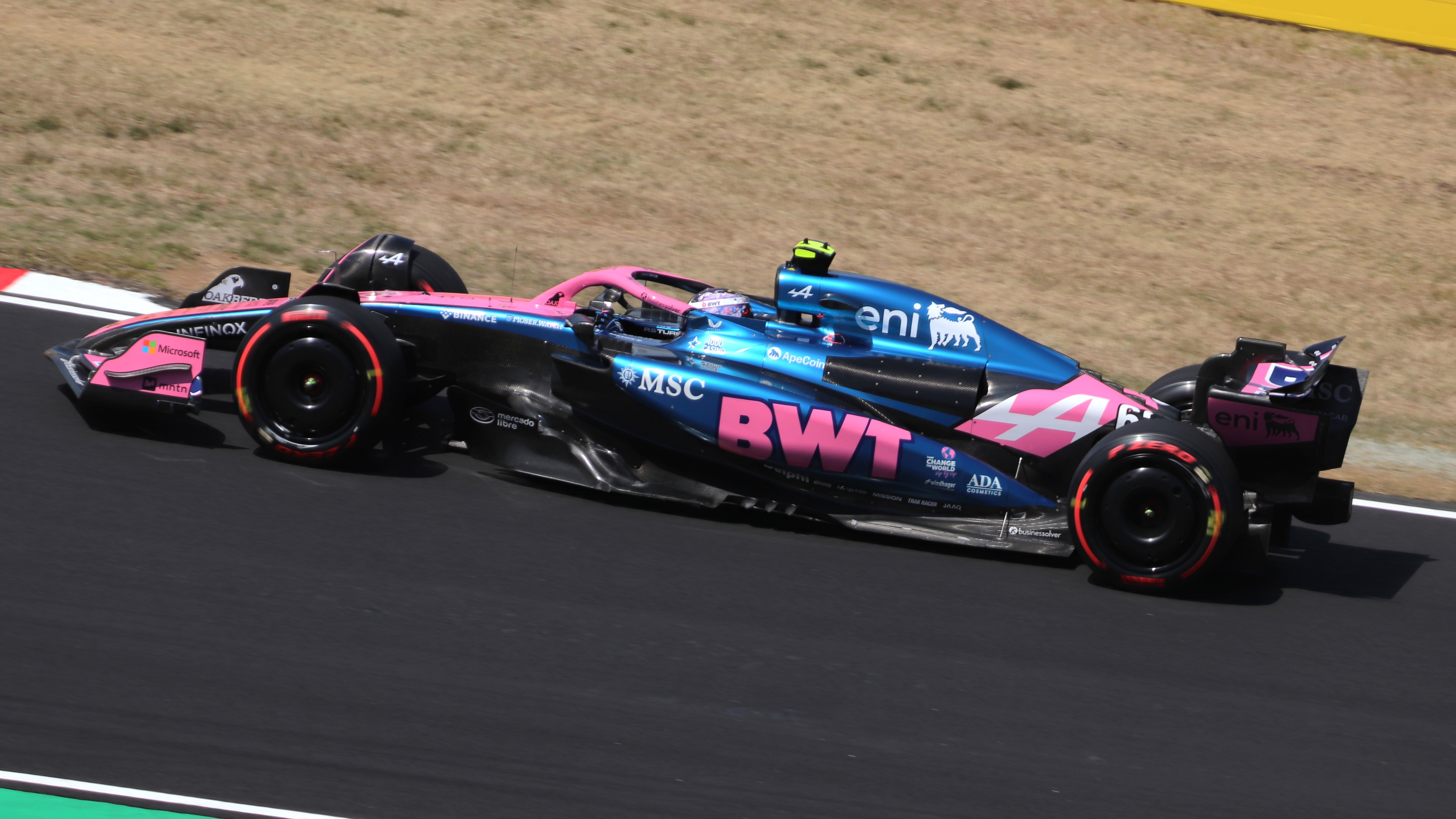
Hirakawa (pictured at the Japanese Grand Prix) served as a reserve driver for Alpine in 2025 for the opening three races.

In January 2025, Alpine F1 Team announced that Hirakawa joined the team and served as test driver along with reserve driver. He participated with the team in FP1 at the Japanese GP.

=== Haas (2025–present) ===
Due to his strong ties with Toyota, however, Hirakawa switched to Haas F1 Team as reserve driver and participated in FP1 for the Bahrain GP. He later made more free practice appearances with the team at the Italian and Mexico City Grand Prix. On the Monday following the United States Grand Prix, Hirakawa suffered a crash while partaking in a private test with Haas at Circuit Zandvoort. Hirakawa returned to the Haas car for young driver tests after the Abu Dhabi Grand Prix, but crashed at turn one.

==== 2026: Grand Prix debut ====
Hirakawa (pictured at the Austrian Grand Prix) made his Formula One debut with Haas in 2026, substituting Esteban Ocon.

Hirakawa continued to make further Friday free practice appearances for Haas in 2026, taking part in the Austrian, Hungarian and Mexico City Grands Prix; the day after his Friday appearance in the latter, Haas announced that he would substitute for regular driver Esteban Ocon for the remainder of the weekend, making him the oldest driver to make their Formula One debut since André Lotterer in 2014. Hirakawa qualified in 18th place, and finished in 13th place in the race after passing the two Williams drivers in the closing laps. However, he was promoted three places following post-race penalties applied to other drivers and was classified in tenth, scoring a point on debut.

== Racing record ==
=== Career summary ===
| Season | Series | Team | Races | Wins | Poles | F/Laps | Podiums | Points | Position |
|---|---|---|---|---|---|---|---|---|---|
| 2010 | Formula Challenge Japan | Clarion FCJ | 11 | 0 | 0 | 1 | 2 | 17 | 6th |
| 2010 | Super-FJ Okayama Series | Clarion RS Serizawa | 4 | 4 | 3 | 4 | 4 | 80 | **1st** |
| 2010 | Super-FJ – All-Japan Masters Race | Clarion RS Serizawa | 1 | 1 | 1 | 1 | 1 | N/A | **1st** |
| 2010 | Formula BMW Pacific | Asia Racing Team | 3 | 0 | 0 | 0 | 0 | 0 | NC† |
| 2011 | Formula Challenge Japan | FTRS Clarion FCJ | 13 | 1 | 1 | 0 | 10 | 73 | **2nd** |
| 2011 | JAF Formula 4 – West Series | Clarion JSS ZAP | 6 | 4 | 4 | 6 | 6 | 110 | **1st** |
| 2011 | JAF Formula 4 – East Series | Clarion JSS ZAP | 1 | 1 | 1 | 1 | 1 | 20 | 7th |
| 2012 | Japanese Formula 3 Championship | RSS | 15 | 7 | 7 | 5 | 13 | 118 | **1st** |
| 2012 | Formula Challenge Japan | FTRS Clarion Hiroshima Toyopet | 12 | 5 | 4 | 4 | 10 | 91 | **2nd** |
| 2012 | Macau Grand Prix | KCMG by RSS | 1 | 0 | 0 | 0 | 0 | N/A | NC |
| 2012 | Porsche Carrera Cup Japan | GARMIN Porsche | 12 | 7 | 6 | ? | 9 | ? | **1st** |
| 2013 | Super Formula | Kygnus Sunoco Team LeMans | 7 | 0 | 0 | 2 | 0 | 9 | 11th |
| 2013 | Gazoo Racing 86/BRZ Race | Hiroshima Toyopet Racing Team | 1 | 0 | 0 | 1 | 0 | 10 | 12th |
| 2014 | Super Formula | Kygnus Sunoco Team LeMans | 9 | 0 | 0 | 0 | 1 | 16.5 | 8th |
| 2014 | Super GT – GT500 | Lexus Team Petronas TOM'S | 2 | 0 | 0 | 0 | 0 | 8 | 11th |
| 2014 | Super Taikyu – ST-1 | KeePer Tomei Sports | 5 | 3 | 2 | 3 | 4 | 111‡ | **1st‡** |
| 2015 | Super Formula | Kygnus Sunoco Team LeMans | 8 | 0 | 0 | 0 | 0 | 13 | 8th |
| 2015 | Super GT – GT500 | Lexus Team KeePer TOM'S | 8 | 2 | 2 | 0 | 2 | 56 | 5th |
| 2016 | Super GT – GT500 | Lexus Team KeePer TOM's | 8 | 0 | 1 | 0 | 2 | 27 | 9th |
| 2016 | European Le Mans Series - LMP2 | Thiriet by TDS Racing | 5 | 2 | 1 | 0 | 3 | 70 | 5th |
| 2017 | Super GT – GT500 | Lexus Team KeePer TOM'S | 8 | 2 | 1 | 0 | 4 | 84 | **1st** |
| 2017 | European Le Mans Series – LMP2 | G-Drive Racing | 4 | 2 | 0 | 0 | 3 | 73 | 4th |
| 2018 | Super GT – GT500 | Lexus Team KeePer TOM'S | 8 | 1 | 0 | 0 | 4 | 75 | **2nd** |
| 2018 | Super Formula | Itochu Enex Team Impul | 6 | 0 | 1 | 0 | 2 | 17 | 5th |
| 2019 | Super GT – GT500 | Lexus Team KeePer TOM'S | 8 | 1 | 0 | 0 | 4 | 83 | **2nd** |
| 2019 | Deutsche Tourenwagen Masters | Lexus Team KeePer TOM'S | 1 | 0 | 0 | 0 | 0 | 0 | NC† |
| 2019 | Super Formula | Itochu Enex Team Impul | 7 | 1 | 1 | 0 | 1 | 12 | 10th |
| 2019 | Super Taikyu - ST-3 | Le Beausset Motorsports | 2 | 0 | 0 | 0 | 1 | 92‡ | 4th‡ |
| 2020 | Super GT – GT500 | TGR Team KeePer TOM'S | 8 | 1 | 2 | 2 | 2 | 67 | **2nd** |
| 2020 | Super Formula | Itochu Enex Team Impul | 7 | 1 | 2 | 0 | 2 | 60 | **2nd** |
| 2021 | Super GT – GT500 | TGR Team KeePer TOM'S | 8 | 0 | 1 | 1 | 3 | 46 | 7th |
| 2021 | Super Formula | Carenex Team Impul | 6 | 0 | 0 | 0 | 2 | 46 | 4th |
| 2021 | Super Taikyu - ST-Z | Hiroshima Toyopet Racing | 4 | 0 | 0 | 0 | 1 | 35‡ | 10th‡ |
| 2022 | FIA World Endurance Championship - Hypercar | Toyota Gazoo Racing | 6 | 2 | 2 | 0 | 5 | 149 | **1st** |
| 2022 | 24 Hours of Le Mans - Hypercar | Toyota Gazoo Racing | 1 | 1 | 1 | 0 | 1 | N/A | **1st** |
| 2022 | Super Formula | Carenex Team Impul | 10 | 2 | 0 | 1 | 4 | 87 | **3rd** |
| 2023 | FIA World Endurance Championship - Hypercar | Toyota Gazoo Racing | 7 | 2 | 2 | 0 | 6 | 172 | **1st** |
| 2023 | 24 Hours of Le Mans - Hypercar | Toyota Gazoo Racing | 1 | 0 | 0 | 0 | 1 | N/A | **2nd** |
| 2023 | Super Formula | Itochu Enex Team Impul | 9 | 0 | 0 | 2 | 3 | 58 | 5th |
| 2024 | FIA World Endurance Championship - Hypercar | Toyota Gazoo Racing | 8 | 2 | 1 | 0 | 2 | 109 | 4th |
| 2024 | Formula One | McLaren F1 Team | Test/Reserve driver | | | | | | |
| 2025 | FIA World Endurance Championship - Hypercar | Toyota Gazoo Racing | 8 | 0 | 0 | 0 | 1 | 66 | 7th |
| 2025 | Formula One | BWT Alpine F1 Team | Test/Reserve driver | | | | | | |
| 2025 | Formula One | MoneyGram Haas F1 Team | Test/Reserve driver | | | | | | |
| 2026 | FIA World Endurance Championship - Hypercar | Toyota Racing | 8 | 3 | 0 | 1 | 4 | 115 | **1st** |
| 2026 | Formula One | TGR Haas F1 Team | 1 | 0 | 0 | 0 | 0 | 1* | 21st* |

† – As Hirakawa was a guest driver, he was ineligible for points.

‡ Teams' standings.
^{*} Season still in progress.

=== Complete Formula Challenge Japan results ===
(Races in bold indicate pole position)(Races in italics indicate fastest lap)

| Year | Team | 1 | 2 | 3 | 4 | 5 | 6 | 7 | 8 | 9 | 10 | 11 | 12 | 13 | 14 | DC | Points |
|---|---|---|---|---|---|---|---|---|---|---|---|---|---|---|---|---|---|
| 2010 | Clarion FCJ | MOT; 1; 4 | MOT; 2; 8 | FUJ; 1; 14 | FUJ; 2; 4 | FUJ; 1; 3 | FUJ; 2; 3 | MOT; 1; 12 | MOT; 2 Ret | SUZ; Ret | SUZ; 1; 13 | SUZ; 2; 10 | SUZ; 3; 10 | | | 6th | 17 |
| 2011 | FTRS Scholarship | FUJ; 1; 2 | FUJ; 2; 2 | SUZ; 1; 7 | SUZ; 2; 3 | FUJ; 1; 2 | FUJ; 2; 1 | FUJ; 3; 3 | SUZ; C | SUZ; 1; 4 | SUZ; 2; 5 | **MOT**; **1**; 2 | MOT; 2; 3 | MOT; 3; 2 | MOT; 4; 2 | 2nd | 73 |
| 2012 | FTRS Scholarship | **FUJ**; **1**; 1 | **FUJ**; **2**; 1 | MOT; 1; 1 | MOT; 2; 3 | FUJ; 1; 2 | FUJ; 2; 2 | FUJ; 3; 3 | **SUZ**; **1**; 2 | SUZ; 2; 1 | **SUZ**; **1**; 1 | SUZ; 2 Ret | SUZ; 3; 5 | | | 2nd | 91 |

=== Complete All-Japan Formula Three Championship results ===
(Races in bold indicate pole position)(Races in italics indicate fastest lap)

| Year | Team | Chassis | Engine | Class | 1 | 2 | 3 | 4 | 5 | 6 | 7 | 8 | 9 | 10 | 11 | 12 | 13 | 14 | 15 | DC | Points |
|---|---|---|---|---|---|---|---|---|---|---|---|---|---|---|---|---|---|---|---|---|---|
| 2012 | RSS | Dallara F312 | Toyota 1AZ-FE | C | SUZ; 1; 1 | **SUZ**; **2**; 1 | **MOT**; **1**; 2 | **MOT**; **2**; 2 | **FUJ**; **1**; 1 | FUJ; 2; 1 | **MOT**; **1**; 1 | **MOT**; **2**; 1 | **OKA**; **1**; 1 | OKA; 2; 2 | SUG; 1 Ret | SUG; 2; 3 | SUG; 3 Ret | FUJ; 1; 3 | FUJ; 2; 3 | 1st | 118 |

=== Complete Super Formula results ===
(Races in bold indicate pole position)(Races in italics indicate fastest lap)

| Year | Team | Engine | 1 | 2 | 3 | 4 | 5 | 6 | 7 | 8 | 9 | 10 | DC | Points |
|---|---|---|---|---|---|---|---|---|---|---|---|---|---|---|
| 2013 | Kygnus Sunoco Team LeMans | Toyota | SUZ; 8 | AUT; 7 | FUJ; 11 | MOT; 7 | SUG; Ret | SUZ; 6 | SUZ; 4 | | | | 11th | 9 |
| 2014 | Kygnus Sunoco Team LeMans | Toyota | SUZ; 4 | FUJ1; Ret | FUJ2; 8 | FUJ; 2 | MOT; 10 | AUT; 13 | SUG; 8 | SUZ; 16 | SUZ; 5 | | 8th | 16.5 |
| 2015 | Kygnus Sunoco Team LeMans | Toyota | SUZ; 12 | OKA; 9 | FUJ; 6 | MOT; 7 | AUT; 4 | SUG; 8 | SUZ; 10 | SUZ; 5 | | | 8th | 13 |
| 2018 | Itochu Enex Team Impul | Toyota | SUZ; Ret | **AUT**; C | SUG; 9 | FUJ; 4 | MOT; 2 | OKA; 3 | SUZ; Ret | | | | 5th | 17 |
| 2019 | Itochu Enex Team Impul | Toyota | SUZ; Ret | AUT; 14 | SUG; 11 | FUJ; 12 | MOT; 1 | **OKA**; 12 | SUZ; 8 | | | | 10th | 12 |
| 2020 | Itochu Enex Team Impul | Toyota | **MOT**; 1^{1} | **OKA**; 4^{1} | SUG; 2^{2} | AUT; 12 | SUZ; Ret | SUZ; 7 | FUJ; 6 | | | | 2nd | 60 |
| 2021 | Carenex Team Impul | Toyota | FUJ; 4 | SUZ; 2 | AUT; Ret | SUG | MOT; 4 | MOT; Ret | SUZ; 2 | | | | 4th | 46 |
| 2022 | Carenex Team Impul | Toyota | FUJ; 1^{3} | FUJ; 2 | SUZ; 7 | AUT; 1 | SUG; 7 | FUJ; Ret | MOT; Ret | MOT; 2 | SUZ; 9 | SUZ; 5 | 3rd | 87 |
| 2023 | Itochu Enex Team Impul | Toyota | FUJ; 3 | FUJ; 21† | SUZ; 3 | AUT; 5 | SUG; 11 | FUJ; 4 | MOT; 2 | SUZ; 7‡ | SUZ; 6 | | 5th | 58 |

^{†} Did not finish the race, but was classified as he completed over 90% of the race distance. ^{‡} Half points awarded as less than 75% of race distance was completed.

=== Complete Super GT results ===
| Year | Team | Car | Class | 1 | 2 | 3 | 4 | 5 | 6 | 7 | 8 | DC | Points |
|---|---|---|---|---|---|---|---|---|---|---|---|---|---|
| 2014 | Lexus Team Petronas TOM'S | Lexus RC F | GT500 | OKA | FUJ; 9 | AUT; 5 | SUG | FUJ | SUZ | BUR | MOT | 20th | 8 |
| 2015 | Lexus Team KeePer TOM'S | Lexus RC F | GT500 | **OKA**; 1 | FUJ; 6 | BUR; 6 | FUJ; 12 | SUZ; 8 | SUG; 9 | AUT; 12 | **MOT**; 1 | 5th | 56 |
| 2016 | Lexus Team KeePer TOM'S | Lexus RC F | GT500 | **OKA**; 2 | FUJ; 3 | SUG; 8 | FUJ; 12 | SUZ; Ret | CHA; 9 | MOT; Ret | MOT; 5 | 9th | 38 |
| 2017 | Lexus Team KeePer TOM'S | Lexus LC 500 | GT500 | OKA; 1 | FUJ; 3 | AUT; 6 | SUG; 10 | FUJ; 6 | SUZ; 6 | **CHA**; 1 | MOT; 2 | 1st | 84 |
| 2018 | Lexus Team KeePer TOM'S | Lexus LC 500 | GT500 | OKA; 3 | FUJ; 7 | SUZ; 3 | CHA; 8 | FUJ; 2 | SUG; 14 | AUT; 1 | MOT; 4 | 2nd | 75 |
| 2019 | Lexus Team KeePer TOM'S | Lexus LC 500 | GT500 | OKA; 12 | FUJ; 7 | SUZ; 2 | CHA; 2 | FUJ; 4 | AUT; 3 | SUG; 4 | MOT; 1 | 2nd | 83 |
| 2020 | TGR Team KeePer TOM'S | Toyota GR Supra | GT500 | **FUJ**; 1 | FUJ; 4 | SUZ; 7 | MOT; 6 | FUJ; 4 | SUZ; Ret | MOT; 6 | **FUJ**; 2 | 2nd | 67 |
| 2021 | TGR Team KeePer TOM'S | Toyota GR Supra | GT500 | **OKA**; 3 | FUJ; 3 | SUZ; 7 | MOT; 10 | SUG; 11 | AUT; 9 | MOT; 10 | FUJ; 2 | 7th | 46 |

=== Complete European Le Mans Series results ===
| Year | Entrant | Class | Chassis | Engine | 1 | 2 | 3 | 4 | 5 | 6 | Rank | Points |
|---|---|---|---|---|---|---|---|---|---|---|---|---|
| 2016 | Thiriet by TDS Racing | LMP2 | Oreca 05 | Nissan VK45DE 4.5 L V8 | **SIL**; Ret | IMO; 1 | RBR; 1 | LEC | SPA; 3 | EST; 8 | 5th | 70 |
| 2017 | G-Drive Racing | LMP2 | Oreca 07 | Gibson GK428 4.2 L V8 | SIL; 2 | MNZ; 1 | RBR | LEC | SPA; 2 | ALG; 4 | 4th | 73 |

=== 24 Hours of Le Mans results ===
| Year | Team | Co-Drivers | Car | Class | Laps | Pos. | Class Pos. |
|---|---|---|---|---|---|---|---|
| 2016 | (France) Thiriet by TDS Racing | (Switzerland) Mathias Beche (France) Pierre Thiriet | Oreca 05-Nissan | LMP2 | 241 | DNF | DNF |
| 2017 | (Russia) G-Drive Racing | (Mexico) Memo Rojas (Mexico) José Gutiérrez | Oreca 07-Gibson | LMP2 | 327 | 39th | 17th |
| 2022 | (Japan) Toyota Gazoo Racing | (Switzerland) Sébastien Buemi (New Zealand) Brendon Hartley | Toyota GR010 Hybrid | Hypercar | 380 | **1st** | **1st** |
| 2023 | (Japan) Toyota Gazoo Racing | (Switzerland) Sébastien Buemi (New Zealand) Brendon Hartley | Toyota GR010 Hybrid | Hypercar | 342 | **2nd** | **2nd** |
| 2024 | (Japan) Toyota Gazoo Racing | (Switzerland) Sébastien Buemi (New Zealand) Brendon Hartley | Toyota GR010 Hybrid | Hypercar | 311 | 5th | 5th |
| 2025 | (Japan) Toyota Gazoo Racing | (Switzerland) Sébastien Buemi (New Zealand) Brendon Hartley | Toyota GR010 Hybrid | Hypercar | 380 | 15th | 15th |
| 2026 | (Japan) Toyota Racing | (Switzerland) Sébastien Buemi (New Zealand) Brendon Hartley | Toyota TR010 Hybrid | Hypercar | 381 | **3rd** | **3rd** |

=== Complete Deutsche Tourenwagen Masters results ===
| Year | Team | Car | 1 | 2 | 3 | 4 | 5 | 6 | 7 | 8 | 9 | 10 | 11 | 12 | 13 | 14 | 15 | 16 | 17 | 18 | Pos | Points |
|---|---|---|---|---|---|---|---|---|---|---|---|---|---|---|---|---|---|---|---|---|---|---|
| 2019 | Lexus Team KeePer TOM'S | Lexus LC500 GT500 | HOC; 1 | HOC; 2 | ZOL; 1 | ZOL; 2 | MIS; 1 | MIS; 2 | NOR; 1 | NOR; 2 | ASS; 1 | ASS; 2 | BRH; 1 | BRH; 2 | LAU; 1 | LAU; 2 | NÜR; 1 | NÜR; 2 | HOC; 1; 13 | HOC; 2 | NC† | 0† |

^{†} As Hirakawa was a guest driver, he was ineligible to score championship points.

=== Complete FIA World Endurance Championship results ===
| Year | Entrant | Class | Car | Engine | 1 | 2 | 3 | 4 | 5 | 6 | 7 | 8 | 9 | Rank | Points |
|---|---|---|---|---|---|---|---|---|---|---|---|---|---|---|---|
| 2016 | Thiriet by TDS Racing | LMP2 | Oreca 05 | Nissan VK45DE 4.5 L V8 | SIL | SPA | LMS; Ret | NÜR | MEX | COA | FUJ | SHA | BHR | NC | 0 |
| 2017 | G-Drive Racing | LMP2 | Oreca 07 | Gibson GK428 4.2 L V8 | SIL | SPA | LMS; 17 | NÜR | MEX | COA | FUJ | SHA | BHR | 34th | 4 |
| 2022 | Toyota Gazoo Racing | Hypercar | Toyota GR010 Hybrid | Toyota H8909 3.5 L Turbo V6 (Hybrid) | SEB; 2 | SPA; Ret | **LMS**; 1 | MNZ; 2 | FUJ; 1 | **BHR**; 2 | | | | 1st | 149 |
| 2023 | Toyota Gazoo Racing | Hypercar | Toyota GR010 Hybrid | Toyota H8909 3.5 L Turbo V6 (Hybrid) | SEB; 2 | **ALG**; 1 | SPA; 2 | LMS; 2 | MNZ; 6 | FUJ; 2 | **BHR**; 1 | | | 1st | 172 |
| 2024 | Toyota Gazoo Racing | Hypercar | Toyota GR010 Hybrid | Toyota H8909 3.5 L Turbo V6 (Hybrid) | QAT; 8 | IMO; 5 | SPA; 6 | LMS; 5 | SÃO; 1 | COA; 15 | FUJ; 10 | **BHR**; 1 | | 4th | 109 |
| 2025 | Toyota Gazoo Racing | Hypercar | Toyota GR010 Hybrid | Toyota H8909 3.5 L Turbo V6 (Hybrid) | QAT; 5 | IMO; 5 | SPA; 4 | LMS; 14 | SÃO; 15 | COA; 9 | FUJ; 16 | BHR; 2 | | 7th | 66 |
| 2026 | Toyota Racing | Hypercar | Toyota TR010 Hybrid | Toyota H8909 3.5 L Turbo V6 (Hybrid) | IMO; 1 | SPA; 10 | LMS; 3 | SÃO; 17 | COA; 6 | FUJ; 1 | CAT; 1 | MNZ; 10 | | 1st | 115 |

=== Complete Formula One results ===
(key) (Races in bold indicate pole position) (Races in italics indicate fastest lap)

| Year | Entrant | Chassis | Engine | 1 | 2 | 3 | 4 | 5 | 6 | 7 | 8 | 9 | 10 | 11 | 12 | 13 | 14 | 15 | 16 | 17 | 18 | 19 | 20 | 21 | 22 | 23 | 24 | WDC | Points |
|---|---|---|---|---|---|---|---|---|---|---|---|---|---|---|---|---|---|---|---|---|---|---|---|---|---|---|---|---|---|
| 2024 | McLaren F1 Team | McLaren MCL38 | Mercedes-AMG M15 E Performance 1.6 V6 t | BHR | SAU | AUS | JPN | CHN | MIA | EMI | MON | CAN | ESP | AUT | GBR | HUN | BEL | NED | ITA | AZE | SIN | USA | MXC | SAP | LVG | QAT | ABU; TD | – | – |
| 2025 | BWT Alpine F1 Team | Alpine A525 | Renault E-Tech RE25 1.6 V6 t | AUS | CHN | JPN; TD | | | | | | | | | | | | | | | | | | | | | | – | – |
| 2025 | MoneyGram Haas F1 Team | Haas VF-25 | Ferrari 066/10 1.6 V6 t | | | | BHR; TD | SAU | MIA | EMI | MON | ESP; TD | CAN | AUT | GBR | BEL | HUN | NED | ITA | AZE | SIN | USA | MXC; TD | SAP | LVG | QAT | ABU; TD | – | – |
| 2026 | TGR Haas F1 Team | Haas VF-26 | Ferrari 067/6 1.6 V6 t | AUS | CHN | JPN | MIA | CAN | MON | BCN | AUT; TD | GBR | BEL | HUN; TD | NED | ITA | ESP | AZE | BHR | SIN | USA | MXC; 10 | SAP | LVG; TD | QAT | ABU | | 21st* | 1* |

* Season still in progress.

Sporting positions
| Preceded by Yuhi Sekiguchi | All-Japan Formula Three Championship; Champion; 2012 | Succeeded by Yuichi Nakayama |
| Preceded by Hideto Yasuoka | Porsche Carrera Cup Japan; Champion; 2012 | Succeeded by Ryo Ogawa |
| Preceded by Heikki Kovalainen; Kohei Hirate | Super GT; GT500 Champion; 2017; With: Nick Cassidy | Succeeded by Naoki Yamamoto; Jenson Button |
| Preceded by Mike Conway; Kamui Kobayashi; José María López | Winner of the 24 Hours of Le Mans; 2022; With: Sébastien Buemi & Brendon Hartley | Succeeded by James Calado; Antonio Giovinazzi; Alessandro Pier Guidi |
| Preceded by Mike Conway; Kamui Kobayashi; José María López | World Endurance Drivers' Champion; 2022-2023; With: Sébastien Buemi & Brendon Hartley | Succeeded by Kévin Estre; André Lotterer; Laurens Vanthoor |
| Preceded by James Calado; Antonio Giovinazzi; Alessandro Pier Guidi | World Endurance Drivers Champion; 2026; With: Sébastien Buemi & Brendon Hartley | Succeeded by Incumbent |
