= 2023 6 Hours of Fuji =

Endurance sports car race

(Japan) 2023 6 Hours of Fuji
Event information
- Round 6 of 7 in the 2023 FIA World Endurance Championship
- Date: 10 September 2023
- Location: Oyama, Shizuoka
- Venue: Fuji Speedway
- Duration: 6 Hours

Results
- Laps completed: 229
- Distance (km): 1044.927
- Distance (miles): 649.215
- Hypercar

Pole position
- Time: 1:27.794
- Team: Toyota Gazoo Racing

Winners
- Team: Toyota Gazoo Racing
- Drivers: (United Kingdom) Mike Conway (Japan) Kamui Kobayashi (Argentina) José María López
- LMP2

Winners
- Team: (Belgium) Team WRT
- Drivers: (Angola) Rui Andrade (Switzerland) Louis Delétraz (Poland) Robert Kubica
- LMGTE Am

Winners
- Team: (Italy) AF Corse
- Drivers: (Italy) Francesco Castellacci (Switzerland) Thomas Flohr (Italy) Davide Rigon

The 2023 6 Hours of Fuji was an endurance sports car race held at Fuji Speedway on 10 September 2023. It was the sixth round of the 2023 FIA World Endurance Championship, and the tenth running of the event in its current format.

== Entry list ==
The entry list was released on 20 July 2023. The entry list consisted of 12 Hypercar entries, 11 LMP2 entries, and 13 LMGTE Am entries. In Hypercar, Stoffel Vandoorne replaced Nico Müller in the No. 94 Peugeot 9X8, due to Müller still recovering from a collarbone injury. Furthermore, Glickenhaus was absent for the race, due to a lack of funds.
In LMP2, Juan Manuel Correa returned to the No. 9 Prema Racing machine, with Andrea Caldarelli taking Mathias Beche's place at the No. 63 Prema Racing machine. Furthermore, Ben Hanley replaced Tom Blomqvist at the No. 23 United Autosports machine.
In LMGTE Am, Kei Cozzolino and Hiroshi Koizumi took place besides Simon Mann in the No. 21 AF Corse machine. Ritomo Miyata made his debut in the No. 57 Kessel Racing machine, replacing Daniel Serra due to Serra being unable to enter Japan. Lastly, the No. 98 NorthWest AMR machine returned to the entry list, after conflicts with the 2023 IMSA SportsCar Championship's 2023 Chevrolet Grand Prix at Mosport Park in Canada.

== Schedule ==
Date	Time (local: JST)	Event
Friday, 8 September	11:00	Free Practice 1
Friday, 8 September	15:30	Free Practice 2
Saturday, 9 September	10:20	Free Practice 3
Saturday, 9 September	14:40	Qualifying - LMGTE Am
Saturday, 9 September	15:05	Qualifying - LMP2
Saturday, 9 September	15:30	Qualifying - Hypercar
Sunday, 10 September	11:00	Race

== Free practice ==
- Only the fastest car in each class is shown.

Free Practice 1	Class	No.	Entrant	Driver	Time
Free Practice 1	Hypercar	50	(Italy) Ferrari AF Corse	(Italy) Antonio Fuoco	1:35.649
Free Practice 1	LMP2	28	(United Kingdom) Jota	(Denmark) Oliver Rasmussen	1:40.781
Free Practice 1	LMGTE Am	77	(Germany) Dempsey-Proton Racing	(Denmark) Mikkel O. Pedersen	1:43.538
Free Practice 2	Class	No.	Entrant	Driver	Time
Free Practice 2	Hypercar	8	(Japan) Toyota Gazoo Racing	(Switzerland) Sébastien Buemi	1:29.523
Free Practice 2	LMP2	41	(Belgium) Team WRT	(Switzerland) Louis Delétraz	1:33.131
Free Practice 2	LMGTE Am	54	(Italy) AF Corse	(Italy) Davide Rigon	1:38.239
Free Practice 3	Class	No.	Entrant	Driver	Time
Free Practice 3	Hypercar	7	(Japan) Toyota Gazoo Racing	(Japan) Kamui Kobayashi	1:30.068
Free Practice 3	LMP2	23	(United Kingdom) United Autosports	(United Kingdom) Oliver Jarvis	1:34.258
Free Practice 3	LMGTE Am	54	(Italy) AF Corse	(Italy) Davide Rigon	1:39.074

== Qualifying ==
Pole position winners in each class are marked in bold.

Pos	Class	No.	Team	Time	Gap	Grid
1	**Hypercar**	**7**	**(Japan) Toyota Gazoo Racing**	**1:27.794**	-	**1**
2	Hypercar	8	(Japan) Toyota Gazoo Racing	1:28.418	+0.624	2
3	Hypercar	6	(Germany) Porsche Penske Motorsport	1:28.687	+0.893	3
4	Hypercar	5	(Germany) Porsche Penske Motorsport	1:28.717	+0.923	4
5	Hypercar	2	(United States) Cadillac Racing	1:28.770	+0.976	5
6	Hypercar	51	(Italy) Ferrari AF Corse	1:28.991	+1.197	6
7	Hypercar	50	(Italy) Ferrari AF Corse	1:29.063	+1.269	7
8	Hypercar	38	(United Kingdom) Hertz Team Jota	1:29.111	+1.317	8
9	Hypercar	99	(Germany) Proton Competition	1:29.338	+1.544	9
10	Hypercar	93	(France) Peugeot TotalEnergies	1:29.898	+2.104	10
11	Hypercar	94	(France) Peugeot TotalEnergies	1:31.822	+4.028	11
12	**LMP2**	**22**	**(United Kingdom) United Autosports**	**1:32.182**	**+4.388**	**12**
13	Hypercar	4	(Austria) Floyd Vanwall Racing Team	1:32.199	+4.405	13
14	LMP2	41	(Belgium) Team WRT	1:32.273	+4.479	14
15	LMP2	23	(United Kingdom) United Autosports	1:32.453	+4.659	15
16	LMP2	28	(United Kingdom) Jota	1:32.778	+4.984	16
17	LMP2	34	(Poland) Inter Europol Competition	1:32.846	+5.052	17
18	LMP2	10	(United Kingdom) Vector Sport	1:32.876	+5.082	18
19	LMP2	31	(Belgium) Team WRT	1:32.893	+5.099	19
20	LMP2	9	(Italy) Prema Racing	1:32.917	+5.123	20
21	LMP2	36	(France) Alpine Elf Team	1:33.027	+5.233	21
22	LMP2	63	(Italy) Prema Racing	1:33.086	+5.292	22
23	LMP2	35	(France) Alpine Elf Team	1:33.400	+5.606	23
24	**LMGTE Am**	**33**	**(United States) Corvette Racing**	**1:38.338**	**+10.544**	**24**
25	LMGTE Am	85	(Italy) Iron Dames	1:38.373	+10.579	25
26	LMGTE Am	777	(Japan) D'Station Racing	1:38.875	+11.081	26
27	LMGTE Am	98	(Canada) NorthWest AMR	1:38.881	+11.087	27
28	LMGTE Am	57	(Switzerland) Kessel Racing	1:39.011	+11.217	28
29	LMGTE Am	83	(Italy) Richard Mille AF Corse	1:39.173	+11.379	29
30	LMGTE Am	56	(Germany) Project 1 – AO	1:39.179	+11.385	30
31	LMGTE Am	77	(Germany) Dempsey-Proton Racing	1:39.183	+11.389	31
32	LMGTE Am	86	(United Kingdom) GR Racing	1:39.202	+11.408	32
33	LMGTE Am	54	(Italy) AF Corse	1:39.283	+11.489	33
34	LMGTE Am	25	(Oman) ORT by TF	1:39.344	+11.550	34
35	LMGTE Am	21	(Italy) AF Corse	1:39.566	+11.772	35
36	LMGTE Am	60	(Italy) Iron Lynx	1:40.292	+12.498	36

== Race ==
The minimum number of laps for classification (70% of overall winning car's distance) was 160 laps. Class winners are in bold and ‡.

Final race classification
Pos	Class	No	Team	Drivers	Chassis	Tyre	Laps	Time/Retired
Pos	Class	No	Team	Drivers	Engine	Tyre	Laps	Time/Retired
1	**Hypercar**	**7**	**(Japan) Toyota Gazoo Racing**	**(United Kingdom) Mike Conway (Japan) Kamui Kobayashi (Argentina) José María López**	**Toyota GR010 Hybrid**	M	**229**	**6:01:17.551‡**
1	**Hypercar**	**7**	**(Japan) Toyota Gazoo Racing**	**(United Kingdom) Mike Conway (Japan) Kamui Kobayashi (Argentina) José María López**	**Toyota H8909 3.5 L Turbo V6**	M	**229**	**6:01:17.551‡**
2	Hypercar	8	(Japan) Toyota Gazoo Racing	(Switzerland) Sébastien Buemi (New Zealand) Brendon Hartley (Japan) Ryo Hirakawa	Toyota GR010 Hybrid	M	229	+39.119
2	Hypercar	8	(Japan) Toyota Gazoo Racing	(Switzerland) Sébastien Buemi (New Zealand) Brendon Hartley (Japan) Ryo Hirakawa	Toyota H8909 3.5 L Turbo V6	M	229	+39.119
3	Hypercar	6	(Germany) Porsche Penske Motorsport	(France) Kévin Estre (Germany) André Lotterer (Belgium) Laurens Vanthoor	Porsche 963	M	229	+47.768
3	Hypercar	6	(Germany) Porsche Penske Motorsport	(France) Kévin Estre (Germany) André Lotterer (Belgium) Laurens Vanthoor	Porsche 9RD 4.6 L Turbo V8	M	229	+47.768
4	Hypercar	50	(Italy) Ferrari AF Corse	(Italy) Antonio Fuoco (Spain) Miguel Molina (Denmark) Nicklas Nielsen	Ferrari 499P	M	228	+1 Lap
4	Hypercar	50	(Italy) Ferrari AF Corse	(Italy) Antonio Fuoco (Spain) Miguel Molina (Denmark) Nicklas Nielsen	Ferrari F163 3.0 L Turbo V6	M	228	+1 Lap
5	Hypercar	51	(Italy) Ferrari AF Corse	(United Kingdom) James Calado (Italy) Antonio Giovinazzi (Italy) Alessandro Pier Guidi	Ferrari 499P	M	228	+1 Lap
5	Hypercar	51	(Italy) Ferrari AF Corse	(United Kingdom) James Calado (Italy) Antonio Giovinazzi (Italy) Alessandro Pier Guidi	Ferrari F163 3.0 L Turbo V6	M	228	+1 Lap
6	Hypercar	38	(United Kingdom) Hertz Team Jota	(Portugal) António Félix da Costa (United Kingdom) Will Stevens (China) Yifei Ye	Porsche 963	M	228	+1 Lap (Note: The Nos. 38, 57, 93, and 777 received a 10-second post-race penalty for not reducing speed to 80 km/h within the required time under FCY. The position of Nos. 38, 93, and 777 were unaffected. The No. 57 dropped from 2nd to 3rd in LMGTE Am.)
6	Hypercar	38	(United Kingdom) Hertz Team Jota	(Portugal) António Félix da Costa (United Kingdom) Will Stevens (China) Yifei Ye	Porsche 9RD 4.6 L Turbo V8	M	228	+1 Lap
7	Hypercar	94	(France) Peugeot TotalEnergies	(France) Loïc Duval (United States) Gustavo Menezes (Belgium) Stoffel Vandoorne	Peugeot 9X8	M	228	+1 Lap
7	Hypercar	94	(France) Peugeot TotalEnergies	(France) Loïc Duval (United States) Gustavo Menezes (Belgium) Stoffel Vandoorne	Peugeot X6H 2.6 L Turbo V6	M	228	+1 Lap
8	Hypercar	93	(France) Peugeot TotalEnergies	(Denmark) Mikkel Jensen (United Kingdom) Paul di Resta (France) Jean-Éric Vergne	Peugeot 9X8	M	226	+3 Laps
8	Hypercar	93	(France) Peugeot TotalEnergies	(Denmark) Mikkel Jensen (United Kingdom) Paul di Resta (France) Jean-Éric Vergne	Peugeot X6H 2.6 L Turbo V6	M	226	+3 Laps
9	Hypercar	99	(Germany) Proton Competition	(Italy) Gianmaria Bruni (Switzerland) Neel Jani (United Kingdom) Harry Tincknell	Porsche 963	M	221	+8 Laps
9	Hypercar	99	(Germany) Proton Competition	(Italy) Gianmaria Bruni (Switzerland) Neel Jani (United Kingdom) Harry Tincknell	Porsche 9RD 4.6 L Turbo V8	M	221	+8 Laps
10	Hypercar	2	(United States) Cadillac Racing	(New Zealand) Earl Bamber (United Kingdom) Alex Lynn (United Kingdom) Richard Westbrook	Cadillac V-Series.R	M	219	+10 Laps
10	Hypercar	2	(United States) Cadillac Racing	(New Zealand) Earl Bamber (United Kingdom) Alex Lynn (United Kingdom) Richard Westbrook	Cadillac LMC55R 5.5 L V8	M	219	+10 Laps
11	**LMP2**	**41**	**(Belgium) Team WRT**	**(Angola) Rui Andrade (Switzerland) Louis Delétraz (Poland) Robert Kubica**	**Oreca 07**	G	**219**	**+10 Laps‡**
11	**LMP2**	**41**	**(Belgium) Team WRT**	**(Angola) Rui Andrade (Switzerland) Louis Delétraz (Poland) Robert Kubica**	**Gibson GK428 4.2 L V8**	G	**219**	**+10 Laps‡**
12	LMP2	22	(United Kingdom) United Autosports	(Portugal) Filipe Albuquerque (United Kingdom) Philip Hanson (United Kingdom) Frederick Lubin	Oreca 07	G	218	+11 Laps
12	LMP2	22	(United Kingdom) United Autosports	(Portugal) Filipe Albuquerque (United Kingdom) Philip Hanson (United Kingdom) Frederick Lubin	Gibson GK428 4.2 L V8	G	218	+11 Laps
13	LMP2	31	(Belgium) Team WRT	(Netherlands) Robin Frijns (Indonesia) Sean Gelael (Austria) Ferdinand Habsburg	Oreca 07	G	218	+11 Laps
13	LMP2	31	(Belgium) Team WRT	(Netherlands) Robin Frijns (Indonesia) Sean Gelael (Austria) Ferdinand Habsburg	Gibson GK428 4.2 L V8	G	218	+11 Laps
14	LMP2	23	(United Kingdom) United Autosports	(United Kingdom) Ben Hanley (United Kingdom) Oliver Jarvis (United States) Josh Pierson	Oreca 07	G	218	+11 Laps
14	LMP2	23	(United Kingdom) United Autosports	(United Kingdom) Ben Hanley (United Kingdom) Oliver Jarvis (United States) Josh Pierson	Gibson GK428 4.2 L V8	G	218	+11 Laps
15	LMP2	36	(France) Alpine Elf Team	(France) Julien Canal (France) Charles Milesi (France) Matthieu Vaxivière	Oreca 07	G	218	+11 Laps
15	LMP2	36	(France) Alpine Elf Team	(France) Julien Canal (France) Charles Milesi (France) Matthieu Vaxivière	Gibson GK428 4.2 L V8	G	218	+11 Laps
16	LMP2	28	(United Kingdom) Jota	(Brazil) Pietro Fittipaldi (Denmark) David Heinemeier Hansson (Denmark) Oliver Rasmussen	Oreca 07	G	218	+11 Laps
16	LMP2	28	(United Kingdom) Jota	(Brazil) Pietro Fittipaldi (Denmark) David Heinemeier Hansson (Denmark) Oliver Rasmussen	Gibson GK428 4.2 L V8	G	218	+11 Laps
17	LMP2	10	(United Kingdom) Vector Sport	(France) Gabriel Aubry (Republic of Ireland) Ryan Cullen (Liechtenstein) Matthias Kaiser	Oreca 07	G	217	+12 Laps
17	LMP2	10	(United Kingdom) Vector Sport	(France) Gabriel Aubry (Republic of Ireland) Ryan Cullen (Liechtenstein) Matthias Kaiser	Gibson GK428 4.2 L V8	G	217	+12 Laps
18	LMP2	9	(Italy) Prema Racing	(United States) Juan Manuel Correa (Romania) Filip Ugran (Netherlands) Bent Viscaal	Oreca 07	G	217	+12 Laps
18	LMP2	9	(Italy) Prema Racing	(United States) Juan Manuel Correa (Romania) Filip Ugran (Netherlands) Bent Viscaal	Gibson GK428 4.2 L V8	G	217	+12 Laps
19	LMP2	34	(Poland) Inter Europol Competition	(Spain) Albert Costa (Switzerland) Fabio Scherer (Poland) Jakub Śmiechowski	Oreca 07	G	217	+12 Laps
19	LMP2	34	(Poland) Inter Europol Competition	(Spain) Albert Costa (Switzerland) Fabio Scherer (Poland) Jakub Śmiechowski	Gibson GK428 4.2 L V8	G	217	+12 Laps
20	LMP2	63	(Italy) Prema Racing	(Italy) Andrea Caldarelli; Daniil Kvyat (France) Doriane Pin	Oreca 07	G	216	+13 Laps
20	LMP2	63	(Italy) Prema Racing	(Italy) Andrea Caldarelli; Daniil Kvyat (France) Doriane Pin	Gibson GK428 4.2 L V8	G	216	+13 Laps
21	LMP2	35	(France) Alpine Elf Team	(United Kingdom) Olli Caldwell (Brazil) André Negrão (Mexico) Memo Rojas	Oreca 07	G	216	+13 Laps
21	LMP2	35	(France) Alpine Elf Team	(United Kingdom) Olli Caldwell (Brazil) André Negrão (Mexico) Memo Rojas	Gibson GK428 4.2 L V8	G	216	+13 Laps
22	Hypercar	4	(Austria) Floyd Vanwall Racing Team	(Argentina) Esteban Guerrieri (Brazil) João Paulo de Oliveira (France) Tristan Vautier	Vanwall Vandervell 680	M	211	+18 Laps
22	Hypercar	4	(Austria) Floyd Vanwall Racing Team	(Argentina) Esteban Guerrieri (Brazil) João Paulo de Oliveira (France) Tristan Vautier	Gibson GL458 4.5 L V8	M	211	+18 Laps
23	**LMGTE Am**	**54**	**(Italy) AF Corse**	**(Italy) Francesco Castellacci (Switzerland) Thomas Flohr (Italy) Davide Rigon**	**Ferrari 488 GTE Evo**	M	**210**	**+19 Laps‡**
23	**LMGTE Am**	**54**	**(Italy) AF Corse**	**(Italy) Francesco Castellacci (Switzerland) Thomas Flohr (Italy) Davide Rigon**	**Ferrari F154CB 3.9 L Turbo V8**	M	**210**	**+19 Laps‡**
24	LMGTE Am	33	(United States) Corvette Racing	(Netherlands) Nicky Catsburg (United States) Ben Keating (Argentina) Nicolás Varrone	Chevrolet Corvette C8.R	M	210	+19 Laps
24	LMGTE Am	33	(United States) Corvette Racing	(Netherlands) Nicky Catsburg (United States) Ben Keating (Argentina) Nicolás Varrone	Chevrolet 5.5 L V8	M	210	+19 Laps
25	LMGTE Am	57	(Switzerland) Kessel Racing	(United States) Scott Huffaker (Japan) Takeshi Kimura (Japan) Ritomo Miyata	Ferrari 488 GTE Evo	M	210	+19 Laps
25	LMGTE Am	57	(Switzerland) Kessel Racing	(United States) Scott Huffaker (Japan) Takeshi Kimura (Japan) Ritomo Miyata	Ferrari F154CB 3.9 L Turbo V8	M	210	+19 Laps
26	LMGTE Am	85	(Italy) Iron Dames	(Belgium) Sarah Bovy (Switzerland) Rahel Frey (Denmark) Michelle Gatting	Porsche 911 RSR-19	M	210	+19 Laps
26	LMGTE Am	85	(Italy) Iron Dames	(Belgium) Sarah Bovy (Switzerland) Rahel Frey (Denmark) Michelle Gatting	Porsche 4.2 L Flat-6	M	210	+19 Laps
27	LMGTE Am	56	(Germany) Project 1 – AO	(Italy) Matteo Cairoli (United States) P.J. Hyett (United States) Gunnar Jeannette	Porsche 911 RSR-19	M	210	+19 Laps
27	LMGTE Am	56	(Germany) Project 1 – AO	(Italy) Matteo Cairoli (United States) P.J. Hyett (United States) Gunnar Jeannette	Porsche 4.2 L Flat-6	M	210	+19 Laps
28	LMGTE Am	77	(Germany) Dempsey-Proton Racing	(France) Julien Andlauer (Germany) Christian Ried (Denmark) Mikkel O. Pedersen	Porsche 911 RSR-19	M	210	+19 Laps
28	LMGTE Am	77	(Germany) Dempsey-Proton Racing	(France) Julien Andlauer (Germany) Christian Ried (Denmark) Mikkel O. Pedersen	Porsche 4.2 L Flat-6	M	210	+19 Laps
29	LMGTE Am	98	(Canada) NorthWest AMR	(United States) Ian James (Italy) Daniel Mancinelli (Spain) Alex Riberas	Aston Martin Vantage AMR	M	210	+19 Laps
29	LMGTE Am	98	(Canada) NorthWest AMR	(United States) Ian James (Italy) Daniel Mancinelli (Spain) Alex Riberas	Aston Martin 4.0 L Turbo V8	M	210	+19 Laps
30	LMGTE Am	86	(United Kingdom) GR Racing	(United Kingdom) Ben Barker (Italy) Riccardo Pera (United Kingdom) Michael Wainwright	Porsche 911 RSR-19	M	210	+19 Laps
30	LMGTE Am	86	(United Kingdom) GR Racing	(United Kingdom) Ben Barker (Italy) Riccardo Pera (United Kingdom) Michael Wainwright	Porsche 4.2 L Flat-6	M	210	+19 Laps
31	LMGTE Am	83	(Italy) Richard Mille AF Corse	(Argentina) Luis Pérez Companc (Italy) Alessio Rovera (France) Lilou Wadoux	Ferrari 488 GTE Evo	M	209	+20 Laps
31	LMGTE Am	83	(Italy) Richard Mille AF Corse	(Argentina) Luis Pérez Companc (Italy) Alessio Rovera (France) Lilou Wadoux	Ferrari F154CB 3.9 L Turbo V8	M	209	+20 Laps
32	LMGTE Am	777	(Japan) D'Station Racing	(Japan) Tomonobu Fujii (Japan) Satoshi Hoshino (United Kingdom) Casper Stevenson	Aston Martin Vantage AMR	M	209	+20 Laps
32	LMGTE Am	777	(Japan) D'Station Racing	(Japan) Tomonobu Fujii (Japan) Satoshi Hoshino (United Kingdom) Casper Stevenson	Aston Martin 4.0 L Turbo V8	M	209	+20 Laps
33	LMGTE Am	60	(Italy) Iron Lynx	(Italy) Matteo Cressoni (Belgium) Alessio Picariello (Italy) Claudio Schiavoni	Porsche 911 RSR-19	M	209	+20 Laps
33	LMGTE Am	60	(Italy) Iron Lynx	(Italy) Matteo Cressoni (Belgium) Alessio Picariello (Italy) Claudio Schiavoni	Porsche 4.2 L Flat-6	M	209	+20 Laps
34	LMGTE Am	21	(Italy) AF Corse	(Japan) Kei Cozzolino (Japan) Hiroshi Koizumi (United States) Simon Mann	Ferrari 488 GTE Evo	M	208	+21 Laps
34	LMGTE Am	21	(Italy) AF Corse	(Japan) Kei Cozzolino (Japan) Hiroshi Koizumi (United States) Simon Mann	Ferrari F154CB 3.9 L Turbo V8	M	208	+21 Laps
35	LMGTE Am	25	(Oman) ORT by TF	(Oman) Ahmad Al Harthy (United States) Michael Dinan (Republic of Ireland) Charlie Eastwood	Aston Martin Vantage AMR	M	206	+23 Laps
35	LMGTE Am	25	(Oman) ORT by TF	(Oman) Ahmad Al Harthy (United States) Michael Dinan (Republic of Ireland) Charlie Eastwood	Aston Martin 4.0 L Turbo V8	M	206	+23 Laps
36	Hypercar	5	(Germany) Porsche Penske Motorsport	(United States) Dane Cameron (Denmark) Michael Christensen (France) Frédéric Makowiecki	Porsche 963	M	182	+47 Laps (Note: The No. 6 Porsche Penske Motorsport Porsche 963 received a 3-lap penalty and an additional 55.067 seconds of race time because Frédéric Makowiecki did not complete his minimum of 1-hour driving time. Their final position was unaffected.)
36	Hypercar	5	(Germany) Porsche Penske Motorsport	(United States) Dane Cameron (Denmark) Michael Christensen (France) Frédéric Makowiecki	Porsche 9RD 4.6 L Turbo V8	M	182	+47 Laps

Tyre manufacturers
Key
Symbol	Tyre manufacturer
**G**	Goodyear
**M**	Michelin

== Notes ==
FIA World Endurance Championship
Previous race: 6 Hours of Monza	2023 season	Next race: 8 Hours of Bahrain
