= Takeshi Kimura (racing driver) =

Japanese racing driver (born 1970)

- Kimura at Silverstone Circuit in 2026.
- Nationality: (Japan) Japanese
- Born: 22 October 1970 (age 56) Matsudo, Japan
- Categorisation: FIA Bronze

Championship titles
- 2022 2018–19: GT World Challenge Asia; Asian Le Mans Series – GT

Takeshi Kimura (木村 武史, Kimura Takeshi; born 22 October 1970 in Matsudo) is a Japanese racing driver who last competed in the European Le Mans Series for Kessel Racing. He is an Asian Le Mans Series class champion and also won 2022 GT World Challenge Asia overall.

Kimura founded Ruf Co., Ltd. in 2001 and still serves as its CEO as of 2026.

In February 2015, Kimura founded CarGuy Racing and also launched SeaGuy in 2024.

== Career ==
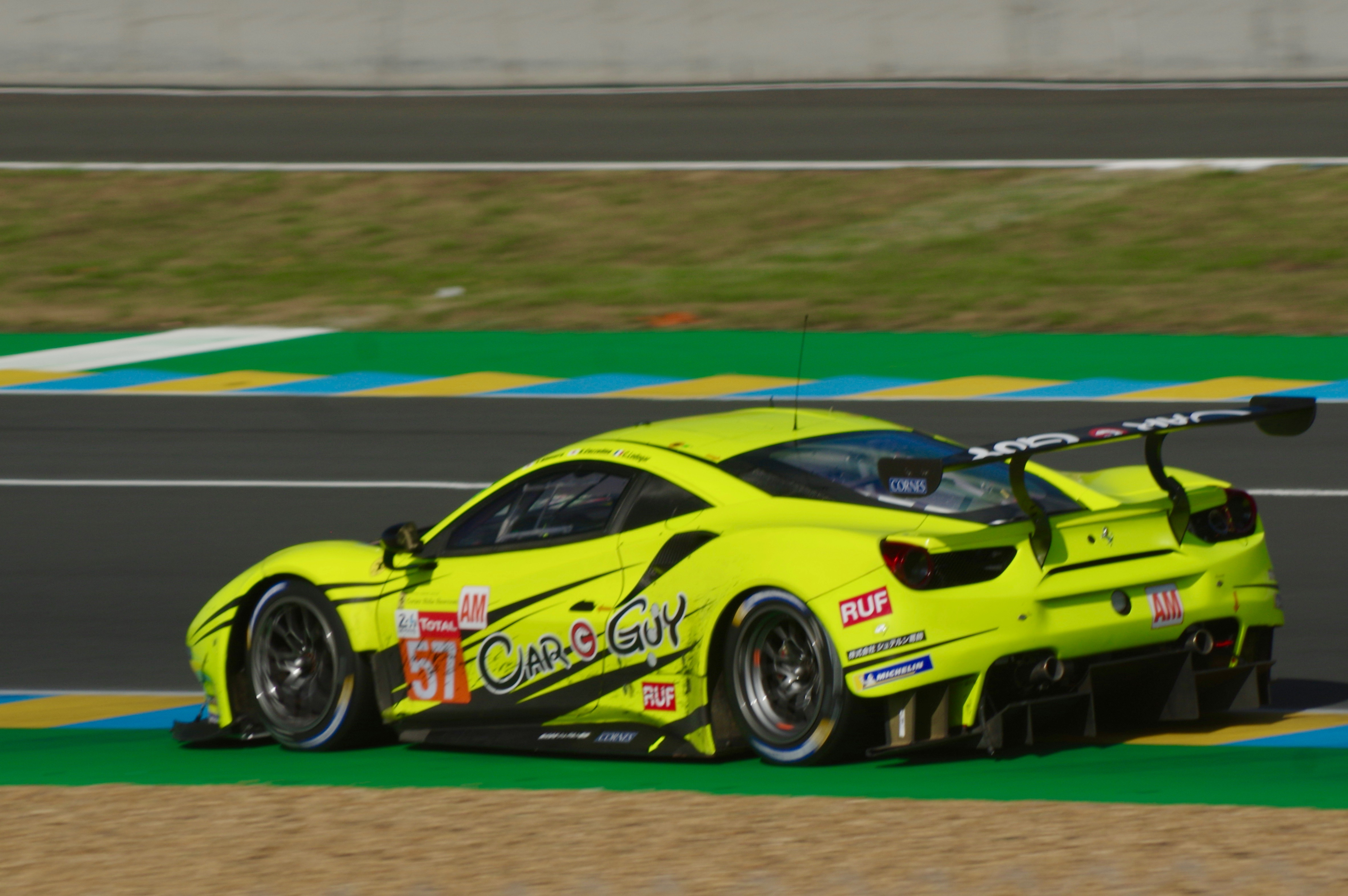
Kimura's CarGuy-branded Ferrari at the 2019 24 Hours of Le Mans

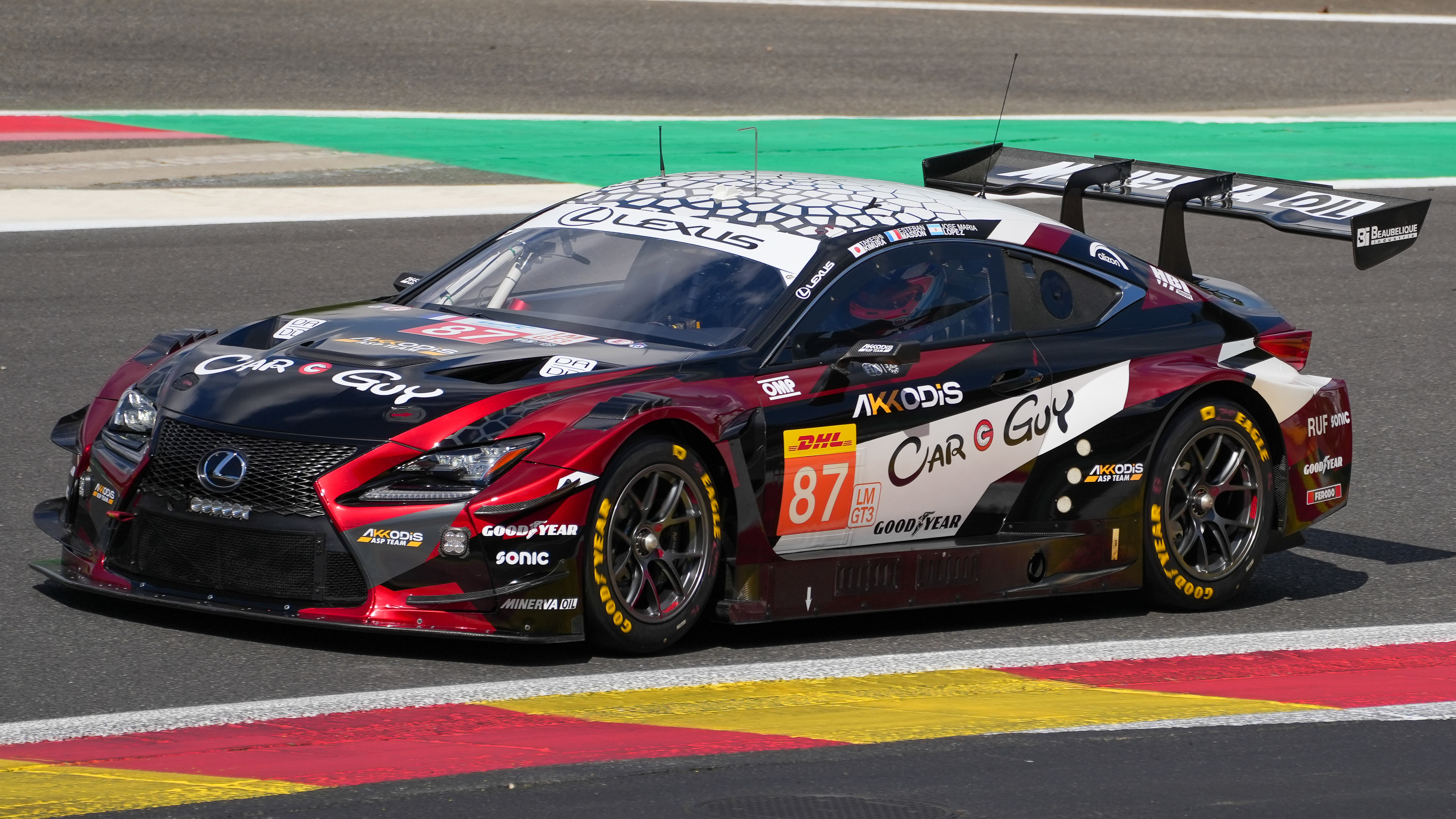
Kimura driving a Lexus for Akkodis ASP at the 2024 6 Hours of Spa-Francorchamps

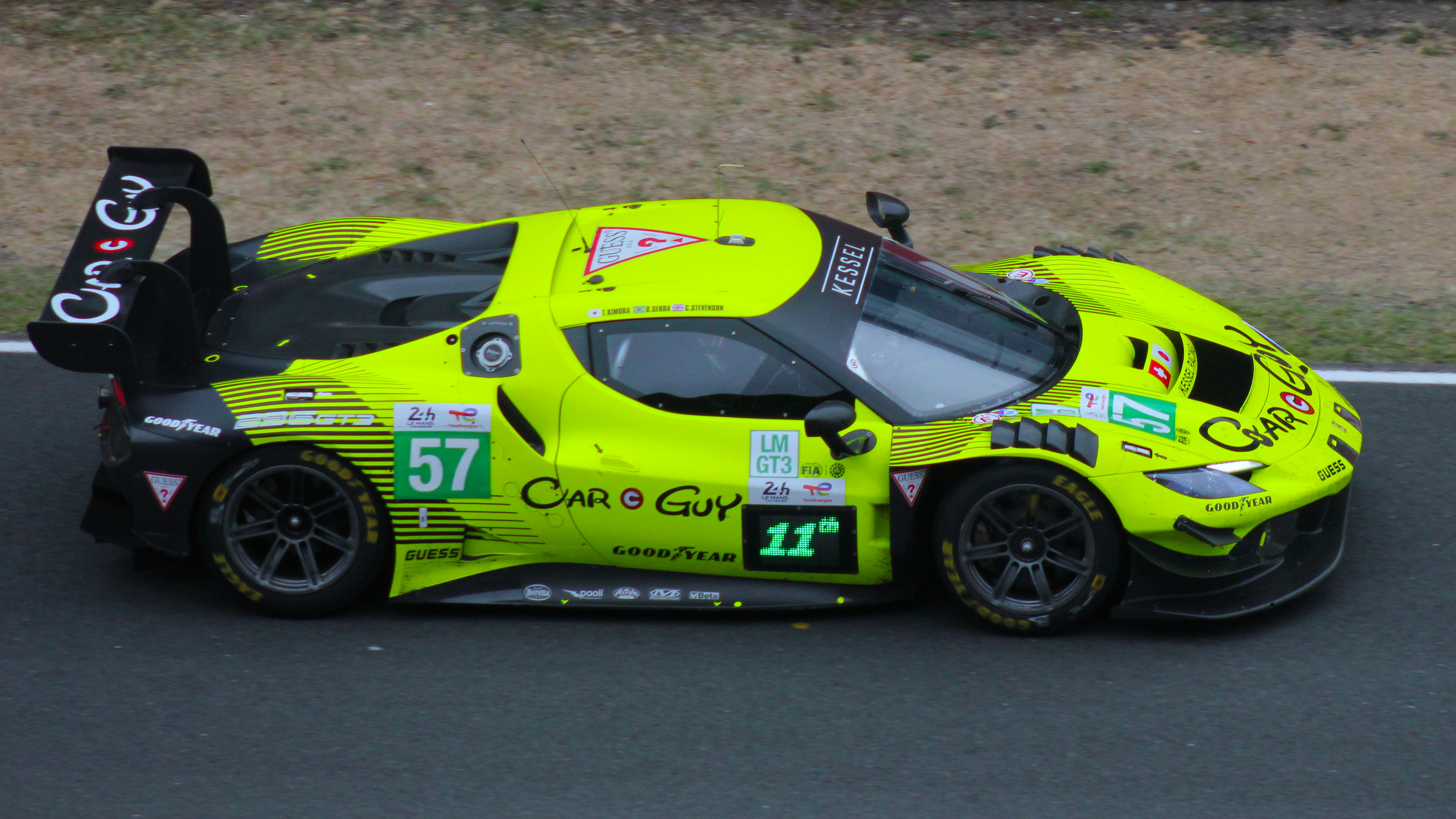
Kimura driving for Kessel Racing at the 2025 24 Hours of Le Mans

Kimura made his car racing debut in 2015, racing in the Lamborghini Super Trofeo Asia, scoring a lone AM class win at Kuala Lumpur and ending the year fifth in points. After racing part-time in Lamborghin Super Trofeo Asia and Super Taikyu the following year, Kimura began expanding CarGuy Racing's operations in 2017 as he made select starts in Lamborghini Super Trofeo Asia, Super Taikyu and Blancpain GT Series Asia.

The following year, Kimura and CarGuy Racing made their debut in Super GT, scoring a best result of 15th at Okayama on debut. During 2018, Kimura also competed in select rounds of the Blancpain GT Series Asia for the same team. At the end of the year, Kimura raced in the GT class of the 2018–19 Asian Le Mans Series, winning all four races to secure the title. After making a one-off appearance in Blancpain GT World Challenge Asia and finishing fifth in the LMGTE Am class at the 24 Hours of Le Mans in 2019, Kimura and CarGuy Racing returned to the Asian Le Mans Series for the 2019–20 season. In his sophomore year in the series, Kimura won at The Bend and finished second at Sepang to end the year runner-up in points.

In 2020, Kimura made starts in the GT300 class of Super GT for X Works, as well as an appearance at the 24 Hours of Le Mans for MR Racing. The following year, Kimura returned to the GT class of the Asian Le Mans Series, scoring a lone win at Abu Dhabi and ending the season sixth in points. For the rest of the year, Kimura competed in select appearances in Super GT's GT300 class for Pacific/CarGuy Racing, taking a best result of ninth at Autopolis, as well as racing in the 24 Hours of Le Mans and Super Taikyu.

The following year, Kimura competed in a dual campaign in both the LMGTE class of the European Le Mans Series, and the newly relaunched GT World Challenge Asia. In ELMS, Kimura scored third-place finishes at Monza and Algarve to end the year sixth in points despite missing one round. In GTWC Asia, Kimura won at Suzuka and Fuji and took four more podiums to secure the overall and Pro-am titles. During 2022, Kimura also raced in select rounds of Super GT in the GT300 class for Pacific CarGuy Racing, as well as making a one-off appearance in the FIA World Endurance Championship at Fuji for Team Project 1. Continuing with Kessel Racing for 2023, Kimura drove with them for a dual campaign in the LMGTE Am class of the FIA World Endurance Championship and the LMGTE class of the European Le Mans Series. In the former, Kimura scored podiums at Sebring and Fuji to end the year seventh in the class standings. In the latter, Kimura scored his maiden series win at Aragón en route to a fourth-place points finish. During 2023, Kimura also raced for CarGuy Racing in both the Asian Le Mans Series, and in select rounds of GT World Challenge Asia.

Switching to Akkodis ASP Team for his second full-time season in the FIA World Endurance Championship, Kimura scored a best result of eighth at the 24 Hours of Le Mans to end the year a lowly 27th in the LMGT3 standings. In parallel to his WEC campaign, Kimura also continued with Kessel Racing to competed in the European Le Mans Series, a season in which he won at Spa and Mugello to secure runner-up honors in LMGT3. At the start of 2025, Kimura competed in the final two rounds of the 2024–25 Asian Le Mans Series for CarGuy Racing, scoring a best result of sixth at Abu Dhabi to end the winter 20th in points. Returning to the European Le Mans Series with Kessel Racing for 2025, Kimura scored two podiums with a best result of second at Barcelona en route to a fifth-place finish.

Kimura continued with Kessel Racing for his fifth full-time campaign in the European Le Mans Series the following year. Racing alongside Mathys Jaubert and Daniel Serra, Kimura began the season by finishing third at Barcelona and then winning at Le Castellet, en route to sixth in points. At the end of the year, Kimura returned to CarGuy to race in the newly-renamed GT3 class of the 2026–27 Asian Le Mans Series.

== Racing record ==
=== Racing career summary ===
Season	Series	Team	Races	Wins	Poles	F/Laps	Podiums	Points	Position
2015	Lamborghini Super Trofeo Asia - Am		9	1	0	0	6	10	5th
2016	Lamborghini Super Trofeo Asia	CarGuy Racing	2	0	0	0	0	0	NC
2016	Super Taikyu - ST-X	DirectionRacing	1	0	0	0	1	15.5‡	11th‡
2017	Lamborghini Super Trofeo Asia - Am	CarGuy Racing	2	0	1	0	2	25	8th
2017	Blancpain GT Series Asia - GT3 Pro-Am	CarGuy Racing	2	0	0	0	0	12	19th
2017	Super Taikyu - ST-X	CarGuy Racing	4	0	0	0	0	32‡	8th‡
2018	Super GT Series - GT300	CarGuy Racing	6	0	0	0	0	0	NC
2018	Blancpain GT Series Asia - GT3 Pro-Am	CarGuy Racing	4	0	0	0	1	25	20th
2018	Suzuka 10 Hours	CarGuy Racing	1	0	0	0	0	N/A	23rd
2018	Super Taikyu - ST-X	CarGuy Racing	1	0	0	0	0	7‡	10th‡
2018–19	Asian Le Mans Series - GT	CarGuy Racing	4	4	1	0	4	101	**1st**
2019	Blancpain GT World Challenge Asia - Am	CarGuy Racing	2	0	1	2	1	30	6th
2019	24 Hours of Le Mans - LMGTE Am	CarGuy Racing	1	0	0	0	0	N/A	5th
2019-20	Asian Le Mans Series - GT	CarGuy Racing	4	1	1	0	2	64	**2nd**
2019-20	FIA World Endurance Championship - LMGTE Am	MR Racing	1	0	0	0	0	0	NC
2020	Super GT - GT300	X Works	2	0	0	0	0	0	NC
2021	Asian Le Mans Series - GT	Car Guy Racing	4	1	0	0	1	31.5	6th
2021	FIA World Endurance Championship – LMGTE Am	Car Guy Racing	4	0	0	0	0	0	NC†
2021	24 Hours of Le Mans - LMGTE Am	Car Guy Racing	1	0	0	0	0	N/A	DNF
2021	Super Taikyu - ST-X	Car Guy Racing	1	0	0	0	0	23‡	7th‡
2021	Super Taikyu - ST-Z	Comet Racing	1	0	0	0	0	1‡	16th‡
2021	Super GT - GT300	Pacific – Car Guy Racing	5	0	0	0	0	2	27th
2022	European Le Mans Series - LMGTE	Car Guy Racing by Kessel Racing	5	0	0	0	2	52	6th
2022	FIA World Endurance Championship - LMGTE Am	Team Project 1	1	0	0	0	0	4	25th
2022	GT World Challenge Asia	CarGuy Racing	8	2	4	7	6	126	**1st**
2022	Super GT - GT300	Pacific Car Guy Racing	6	0	0	0	0	0	NC
2023	Asian Le Mans Series - GT	Car Guy Racing	4	0	0	0	0	1	19th
2023	GT World Challenge Asia – Pro-Am	Car Guy Racing	6	0	0	0	0	18	30th
2023	FIA World Endurance Championship - LMGTE Am	Kessel Racing	7	0	0	0	2	58	7th
2023	European Le Mans Series - LMGTE	Kessel Racing	6	1	0	2	1	65	4th
2024	FIA World Endurance Championship - LMGT3	Akkodis ASP Team	8	0	0	0	0	8	27th
2024	European Le Mans Series - LMGT3	Kessel Racing	6	2	0	2	2	74	**2nd**
2024–25	Asian Le Mans Series - GT	CarGuy Racing	4	0	0	0	0	9	20th
2025	European Le Mans Series - LMGT3	Kessel Racing	6	0	0	0	2	53	5th
2025	24 Hours of Le Mans – LMGT3	Kessel Racing	1	0	0	0	0	—N/a	8th
2025	Ligier European Series - JS P4	Pegasus Racing	2	0	0	0	0	0	24th
2026	European Le Mans Series – LMGT3	Kessel Racing	6	1	0	0	2	52	6th
2026	24 Hours of Le Mans – LMGT3	Kessel Racing	1	0	0	0	0	—N/a	10th
2026	SRO Japan Cup – GT3 Am	CarGuy Racing	2	0	0	0	1	15	7th
2026–27	Asian Le Mans Series – GT3	CarGuy Racing						*	*

‡ Team standings

=== Complete GT World Challenge Asia results ===
(key) (Races in bold indicate pole position) (Races in italics indicate fastest lap)

Year	Team	Car	Class	1	2	3	4	5	6	7	8	9	10	11	12	DC	Pts
2017	Car Guy Racing	Lamborghini Huracán GT3	Pro-Am	SEP; 1	SEP; 2	BUR; 1	BUR; 2	SUZ; 1; 8	SUZ; 2; 6	FUJ; 1	FUJ; 2	SHA; 1	SHA; 2	ZHE; 1	ZHE; 2	19th	12
2018	Car Guy Racing	Lamborghini Huracán GT3	Pro-Am	SEP; 1	SEP; 2	BUR; 1	BUR; 2	SUZ; 1; 6	SUZ; 2; 3	FUJ; 1; 11	FUJ; 2; 9	SHA; 1	SHA; 2	ZHE; 1	ZHE; 2	20th	25
2019	CarGuy Racing	Ferrari 488 GT3	Am	SEP; 1	SEP; 2	CHA; 1	CHA; 2	SUZ; 1	SUZ; 2	FUJ; 1; 2	**FUJ**; **2**; 4	KOR; 1	KOR; 2	SHA; 1	SHA; 2	6th	30
2022	Car Guy Racing	Ferrari 488 GT3 Evo 2020	Pro-Am	SEP; 1	SEP; 2	**SUZ**; **1**; 1	**SUZ**; **2**; 5	**FUJ**; **1**; 1	**FUJ**; **2**; 3	SUG; 1; 2	**SUG**; **2**; 3	OKA; 1; 2	OKA; 2; 12			2nd	153
2023	Car Guy Racing	Ferrari 296 GT3	Pro-Am	BUR; 1	BUR; 2	FUJ; 1; 12	FUJ; 2; 9	SUZ; 1	SUZ; 2	MOT; 1; 7	MOT; 2; 24	OKA; 1; 6	OKA; 2; 16	SEP; 1	SEP; 2	30th	18

=== Complete Super GT results ===
(key) (Races in bold indicate pole position) (Races in italics indicate fastest lap)

Year	Team	Car	Class	1	2	3	4	5	6	7	8	DC	Pts
2018	Car Guy Racing	Honda NSX GT3	GT300	OKA; 15	FUJ; 26	SUZ; 21	CHA	FUJ; 17	SUG	AUT; Ret	MOT; 23	NC	0
2020	X Works	Audi R8 LMS EVO	GT300	FUJ	FUJ	SUZ; 24	MOT; 27	FUJ	SUZ	MOT	FUJ	NC	0
2021	Pacific - Car Guy Racing	Ferrari 488 GT3 EVO 2020	GT300	OKA; 23	FUJ1; 25	SUZ	MOT1	SUG; 15	AUT; 9	MOT2	FUJ2; 13	27th	2
2022	Pacific Car Guy Racing	Ferrari 488 GT3 EVO 2020	GT300	OKA	FUJ; 23	SUZ; 17	FUJ; 12	SUZ	SUG; Ret	AUT; 13	MOT; 15	NC	0

=== Complete Asian Le Mans Series results ===
(key) (Races in bold indicate pole position) (Races in italics indicate fastest lap)

Year	Team	Class	Car	Engine	1	2	3	4	5	6	Pos.	Points
2018–19	Car Guy Racing	GT	Ferrari 488 GT3	Ferrari F154CB 3.9 L Turbo V8	SHA; 1	**FUJ**; 1	CHA; 1	SEP; 1			1st	101
2019–20	Car Guy Racing	GT	Ferrari 488 GT3	Ferrari F154CB 3.9 L Turbo V8	SHA; 5	BEN; 1	**CHA**; 5	SEP; 2			2nd	64
2021	Car Guy Racing	GT	Ferrari 488 GT3 Evo 2020	Ferrari F154CB 3.9 L Turbo V8	DUB; 1; 9	DUB; 2; 8	ABU; 1; 13	ABU; 2; 1			6th	31.5
2023	Car Guy Racing	GT	Ferrari 488 GT3 Evo 2020	Ferrari F154CB 3.9 L Turbo V8	DUB; 1; 14	DUB; 2 Ret	ABU; 1; 10	ABU; 2; 14			19th	1
2024–25	CarGuy Racing	GT	Ferrari 296 GT3	Ferrari F163 3.0 L Turbo V6	SEP; 1	SEP; 2	DUB; 1; 11	DUB; 2; 11	ABU; 1 Ret	ABU; 2; 6	20th	9

=== Complete FIA World Endurance Championship results ===
(key) (Races in bold indicate pole position; races in italics indicate fastest lap)

Year	Entrant	Class	Car	Engine	1	2	3	4	5	6	7	8	Rank	Points
2019-20	MR Racing	LMGTE Am	Ferrari 488 GTE Evo	Ferrari F154CB 3.9 L Turbo V8	SIL	FUJ	SHA	BHR	COA	SPA	LMS; Ret	BHR	NC	0
2021	Kessel Racing	LMGTE Am	Ferrari 488 GTE Evo	Ferrari F154CB 3.9L Turbo V8	SPA	POR; 4	MON	LMS; Ret	BHR; 9	BHR; 5			NC†	0†
2022	Team Project 1	LMGTE Am	Porsche 911 RSR-19	Porsche 4.2 L Flat-6	SEB	SPA	LMS	MNZ	FUJ; 8	BHR			25th	4
2023	Kessel Racing	LMGTE Am	Ferrari 488 GTE Evo	Ferrari F154CB 3.9 L Turbo V8	SEB; 3	PRT; 10	SPA; 8	LMS; Ret	MNZ; Ret	FUJ; 3	BHR; 5		7th	58
2024	Akkodis ASP Team	LMGT3	Lexus RC F GT3	Lexus 2UR-GSE 5.0 L V8	QAT; 16	IMO; 15	SPA; 14	LMS; 8	SÃO; 11	COA; 11	FUJ; 12	BHR; Ret	27th	8

^{†} As Kimura was a guest driver, he was ineligible for championship points.

=== Complete 24 Hours of Le Mans results ===
Year	Team	Co-Drivers	Car	Class	Laps	Pos.	Class Pos.
2019	(Japan) Car Guy Racing	(Japan) Kei Cozzolino (France) Côme Ledogar	Ferrari 488 GTE	GTE; Am	332	35th	5th
2020	(Japan) MR Racing	(Monaco) Vincent Abril (Japan) Kei Cozzolino	Ferrari 488 GTE Evo	GTE; Am	172	DNF	DNF
2021	(Switzerland) Kessel Racing	(Australia) Scott Andrews (Denmark) Mikkel Jensen	Ferrari 488 GTE Evo	GTE; Am	128	DNF	DNF
2022	(Switzerland) Kessel Racing	(Denmark) Mikkel Jensen (Denmark) Frederik Schandorff	Ferrari 488 GTE Evo	GTE; Am	336	45th	12th
2023	(Switzerland) Kessel Racing	(United States) Scott Huffaker (Brazil) Daniel Serra	Ferrari 488 GTE Evo	GTE; Am	254	DNF	DNF
2024	(France) Akkodis ASP Team	(United Kingdom) Jack Hawksworth (France) Esteban Masson	Lexus RC F GT3	LMGT3	279	37th	10th
2025	(Switzerland) Kessel Racing	(Brazil) Daniel Serra (United Kingdom) Casper Stevenson	Ferrari 296 GT3	LMGT3	339	40th	8th
2026	(Switzerland) Kessel Racing	(Denmark) Conrad Laursen (Brazil) Daniel Serra	Ferrari 296 GT3 Evo	LMGT3	334	42nd	10th

=== Complete European Le Mans Series results ===
(key) (Races in bold indicate pole position; results in italics indicate fastest lap)

Year	Entrant	Class	Chassis	Engine	1	2	3	4	5	6	Rank	Points
2022	Car Guy Racing by Kessel Racing	LMGTE	Ferrari 488 GTE Evo	Ferrari F154CB 3.9 L Turbo V8	LEC; 5	IMO; DSQ	MNZ; 3	CAT; 4	SPA	ALG; 3	6th	52
2023	Kessel Racing	LMGTE	Ferrari 488 GTE Evo	Ferrari F154CB 3.9 L Turbo V8	BAR; 7	LEC; 4	ARA; 1	SPA; 5	POR; 4	ALG; 12	4th	65
2024	Kessel Racing	LMGT3	Ferrari 296 GT3	Ferrari F163 3.0 L Turbo V6	CAT; 9	LEC; Ret	IMO; 4	SPA; 1	MUG; 1	ALG; 5	2nd	74
2025	Kessel Racing	LMGT3	Ferrari 296 GT3	Ferrari F163CE 3.0 L Turbo V6	CAT; 2	LEC; 9	IMO; Ret	SPA; 3	SIL; 4	ALG; 7	5th	53
2026	Kessel Racing	LMGT3	Ferrari 296 GT3 Evo	Ferrari F163CE 3.0 L Turbo V6	CAT; 3	LEC; 1	IMO; 11	SPA; Ret	SIL; 4	ALG; 13	6th	52

^{*} Season still in progress.
