= 2007 Formula Toyota season =

2007 Formula Toyota

Seasons
- ← 2006 none →

The 2007 Formula Toyota season was the 18th and last season for this racing class.

== Drivers and teams ==
All cars are Bridgestone shod Toyota FT30 cars with a Toyota 4A-GE engine.

Team	No.	Driver	Note
(Japan) Aim Sports	72	(Japan) Kanai AkiraTadashi	
(Japan) Forward Racing	2	(Japan) Maekawa Tadahiro	
(Japan) Team Le Beauset	62	(Japan) Jiro AzumaToru	
(Japan) Team Le Beauset	63	(Italy) Kei Cozzolino	
(Japan) Team Le Beauset		(Japan) Abiko Kiyofumi	
(Japan) Ma Racing	32	(Japan) Keisuke Kunimoto	Toyota Driver Program Scholarship
(Japan) Ma Racing	45	(Japan) Matsubara Ryoji	
(Japan) Ma Racing	71	(Japan) Masuda Teishin	
(Japan) Motorsports Field	1	(Japan) Matsushita Akira	
(Japan) Motorsports Field	3	(Japan) Inagaki Tomohiko	
(Japan) Motorsports Field		(Japan) Yoshifumi Kubota	
(Japan) Motorsports Field	39	(Japan) Toru Sato	
(Japan) Motorsports Field	7	(Japan) Matsui Takayoshi	
(Japan) Replication Sports	10	(Japan) Kobayashi Ichiumi	
(Japan) Replication Sports	24	(Japan) Okamoto Takenouchi	
(Japan) Replication Sports	70	(Japan) Shirasaka Takuya	
(Japan) Tom's Spirit	8	(Japan) Takuto Iguchi	Toyota Driver Program Scholarship
(Japan) Tom's Spirit		(Japan) Matsui Takayoshi	Toyota Driver Program Scholarship
(Japan) Tom's Spirit	7	(Japan) Yuji Kunimoto	Toyota Driver Program Scholarship
(Japan) Winds garage	82	(Japan) Yoshikawa Hideaki	
(Japan) Winds garage	83	(Japan) Yuki Nishioka	
(Japan) Winds garage		(Japan) Achiwa Hideaki	
(Japan) Winds garage	84	(Japan) Asai Yuya	
(Japan) Winds garage	82	(Japan) Nakamura Shinya	
(Japan) ZAP SPEED	14	(Japan) Adachi Genki	

== Event calendar and results ==
Round	Circuit	Location	Date	Pole position	Fastest lap	Winning driver
1	Fuji International Speedway	Oyama, Shizuoka	April 8	(Japan) Takuto Iguchi	(Japan) Matsui Takayoshi	(Japan) Keisuke Kunimoto
2	Suzuka Circuit	Suzuka, Mie	May 13	(Italy) Kei Cozzolino	(Japan) Masuda Teishin	(Japan) Keisuke Kunimoto
3	Twin Ring Motegi	Motegi, Tochigi	July 1	(Japan) Takuto Iguchi	(Japan) Takuto Iguchi	(Japan) Takuto Iguchi
4	Sendai Hi-Land Raceway	Aoba-ku, Sendai	October 6	(Japan) Takuto Iguchi	(Japan) Takuto Iguchi	(Japan) Takuto Iguchi
5	Sendai Hi-Land Raceway	Aoba-ku, Sendai	October 7		(Italy) Kei Cozzolino	(Italy) Kei Cozzolino
6	Sports Land SUGO	Murata, Miyagi	October 28	(Italy) Kei Cozzolino	(Japan) Keisuke Kunimoto	(Italy) Kei Cozzolino
7	Fuji International Speedway	Oyama, Shizuoka	November 25	(Japan) Takuto Iguchi	(Japan) Takuto Iguchi	(Italy) Kei Cozzolino

== Final standings ==
Position	Driver	Points
1	(Italy) Kei Cozzolino	103
2	(Japan) Keisuke Kunimoto	98
3	(Japan) Takuto Iguchi	82
4	(Japan) Masuda Teishin	48
5	(Japan) Matsushita Akira	48
6	(Japan) Kanai AkiraTadashi	45
7	(Japan) Jiro AzumaToru	30
8	(Japan) Shirasaka Takuya	27
9	(Japan) Matsui Takayoshi	21
10	(Japan) Kunimoto Press	18
11	(Japan) Adachi Genki	9
12	(Japan) Kobayashi Ichiumi	9
13	(Japan) Inagaki Tomohiko	9
14	(Japan) Yoshifumi Kubota	6
15	(Japan) Nakamura Shinya	6
16	(Japan) Matsubara Ryoji	2
17	(Japan) Ishii Zenta	1
18	(Japan) Abiko Kiyofumi	1
19	(Japan) Maekawa Tadahiro	1
20	(Japan) Okamoto Takenouchi	
21	(Japan) Yoshikawa Hideaki	
22	(Japan) Achiwa Tsutomu	
23	(Japan) Sato Naotaira	
24	(Japan) Yuki Nishioka	
25	(Japan) Asai Yuya	
26	(Japan) Toru Sato	
