= 2021 Super GT Series =

Motor racing championship

The 2021 Autobacs Super GT Series was a motor racing championship based in Japan for grand touring cars. The series is sanctioned by the Japan Automobile Federation (JAF) and run by the GT Association (GTA). It was the twenty-ninth season of the Japan Automobile Federation Super GT Championship which includes the All Japan Grand Touring Car Championship (JGTC) era, and the seventeenth season under the Super GT name. It was the thirty-ninth overall season of a national JAF sportscar championship, dating back to the All Japan Sports Prototype Championship.

TGR Team au TOM'S and drivers Yuhi Sekiguchi and Sho Tsuboi won the GT500 class championships, driving the Toyota Supra, after overcoming a 16-point deficit in the final round of the season. The titles were secured in controversial circumstances as championship leader Naoki Yamamoto of Team Kunimitsu was taken out from a title-clinching position by GT300 class driver Ren Sato with 15 laps remaining in the final race of the season. Driving the new Subaru BRZ, Takuto Iguchi and Hideki Yamauchi won the GT300 class championships for R&D Sport, giving Subaru their first-ever title in Super GT competition. It was also the first drivers' title for both Iguchi and Yamauchi, and the first for the R&D Sport team.

== Calendar ==
A provisional eight-round 2021 calendar was announced on 7 August 2020. Autopolis, Okayama International Circuit, and Sportsland Sugo returned to the calendar after a year's absence. The Fuji GT 500km Race also returned to its traditional calendar slot on the Golden Week holiday of 3-4 May.

On 9 February 2021, the planned rounds at Chang International Circuit in Thailand and Sepang International Circuit in Malaysia were cancelled due to travel restrictions. A revised schedule was released on the same day with all eight rounds being held in Japan, and with the addition of an additional round at Fuji Speedway in November and Twin Ring Motegi in July. On 11 May 2021, the third round at Suzuka International Racing Course, which had been set to take place on 30 May as the third round of the championship, was postponed indefinitely due to a renewed wave of COVID-19 cases in Japan. The race was subsequently rescheduled to 22 August.

=== Circuits and dates ===
Round	Event	Circuit	Dates
1	Takanokono Hotel Okayama GT 300km Race	Okayama International Circuit	10-11 April
2	Takanokono Hotel Fuji GT 500km Race	Fuji Speedway	3-4 May
3	Motegi GT 300km Race	Twin Ring Motegi	17-18 July
4	Fujimaki Group Suzuka GT 300km Race	Suzuka Circuit	21-22 August
5	Sugo GT 300km Race	Sportsland Sugo	11-12 September
6	Autopolis GT 300km Race	Autopolis	23-24 October
7	Motegi GT 300km Race	Twin Ring Motegi	6-7 November
8	Fujimaki Group Fuji GT 300km Race	Fuji Speedway	27-28 November

== Teams and drivers ==
=== GT500 ===
Team	Make	Car	Engine	No.	Drivers	Tyre	Rounds
(Japan) Team Kunimitsu	Honda	Honda NSX-GT	Honda HR-420E 2.0 L Turbo I4	1	(Japan) Naoki Yamamoto	B	All
(Japan) Team Kunimitsu	Honda	Honda NSX-GT	Honda HR-420E 2.0 L Turbo I4	1	(Japan) Hideki Mutoh	B	1–2
(Japan) Team Kunimitsu	Honda	Honda NSX-GT	Honda HR-420E 2.0 L Turbo I4	1	(Japan) Tadasuke Makino	B	2–8
(Japan) NDDP Racing with B-Max	Nissan	Nissan GT-R NISMO GT500	Nissan NR4S21 2.0 L Turbo I4	3	(Japan) Kohei Hirate	M	All
(Japan) NDDP Racing with B-Max	Nissan	Nissan GT-R NISMO GT500	Nissan NR4S21 2.0 L Turbo I4	3	(Japan) Katsumasa Chiyo	M	All
(Japan) ARTA	Honda	Honda NSX-GT	Honda HR-420E 2.0 L Turbo I4	8	(Japan) Tomoki Nojiri	B	All
(Japan) ARTA	Honda	Honda NSX-GT	Honda HR-420E 2.0 L Turbo I4	8	(Japan) Nirei Fukuzumi	B	All
(Japan) Team Impul	Nissan	Nissan GT-R NISMO GT500	Nissan NR4S21 2.0 L Turbo I4	12	(Japan) Kazuki Hiramine	B	All
(Japan) Team Impul	Nissan	Nissan GT-R NISMO GT500	Nissan NR4S21 2.0 L Turbo I4	12	(Japan) Nobuharu Matsushita	B	All
(Japan) TGR Team Eneos ROOKIE	Toyota GR	Toyota GR Supra GT500	Toyota RI4AG 2.0 L Turbo I4	14	(Japan) Kazuya Oshima	B	All
(Japan) TGR Team Eneos ROOKIE	Toyota GR	Toyota GR Supra GT500	Toyota RI4AG 2.0 L Turbo I4	14	(Japan) Kenta Yamashita	B	All
(Japan) Team Red Bull Mugen	Honda	Honda NSX-GT	Honda HR-420E 2.0 L Turbo I4	16	(Japan) Ukyo Sasahara	D	All
(Japan) Team Red Bull Mugen	Honda	Honda NSX-GT	Honda HR-420E 2.0 L Turbo I4	16	(Japan) Toshiki Oyu	D	All
(Japan) Astemo REAL Racing	Honda	Honda NSX-GT	Honda HR-420E 2.0 L Turbo I4	17	(Japan) Koudai Tsukakoshi	B	All
(Japan) Astemo REAL Racing	Honda	Honda NSX-GT	Honda HR-420E 2.0 L Turbo I4	17	(Belgium) Bertrand Baguette	B	All
(Japan) TGR Team WedsSport Bandoh	Toyota GR	Toyota GR Supra GT500	Toyota RI4AG 2.0 L Turbo I4	19	(Japan) Yuji Kunimoto	Y	All
(Japan) TGR Team WedsSport Bandoh	Toyota GR	Toyota GR Supra GT500	Toyota RI4AG 2.0 L Turbo I4	19	(Japan) Ritomo Miyata	Y	All
(Japan) NISMO	Nissan	Nissan GT-R NISMO GT500	Nissan NR4S21 2.0 L Turbo I4	23	(Japan) Tsugio Matsuda	M	All
(Japan) NISMO	Nissan	Nissan GT-R NISMO GT500	Nissan NR4S21 2.0 L Turbo I4	23	(Italy) Ronnie Quintarelli	M	All
(Japan) Kondo Racing	Nissan	Nissan GT-R NISMO GT500	Nissan NR4S21 2.0 L Turbo I4	24	(Japan) Mitsunori Takaboshi	Y	All
(Japan) Kondo Racing	Nissan	Nissan GT-R NISMO GT500	Nissan NR4S21 2.0 L Turbo I4	24	(Japan) Daiki Sasaki	Y	All
(Japan) TGR Team au TOM'S	Toyota GR	Toyota GR Supra GT500	Toyota RI4AG 2.0 L Turbo I4	36	(Japan) Yuhi Sekiguchi	B	All
(Japan) TGR Team au TOM'S	Toyota GR	Toyota GR Supra GT500	Toyota RI4AG 2.0 L Turbo I4	36	(Japan) Sho Tsuboi	B	All
(Japan) TGR Team KeePer TOM'S	Toyota GR	Toyota GR Supra GT500	Toyota RI4AG 2.0 L Turbo I4	37	(Japan) Ryō Hirakawa	B	All
(Japan) TGR Team KeePer TOM'S	Toyota GR	Toyota GR Supra GT500	Toyota RI4AG 2.0 L Turbo I4	37	(Japan) Sena Sakaguchi	B	1–5
(Japan) TGR Team KeePer TOM'S	Toyota GR	Toyota GR Supra GT500	Toyota RI4AG 2.0 L Turbo I4	37	(France) Sacha Fenestraz	B	6–8
(Japan) TGR Team ZENT Cerumo	Toyota GR	Toyota GR Supra GT500	Toyota RI4AG 2.0 L Turbo I4	38	(Japan) Yuji Tachikawa	B	All
(Japan) TGR Team ZENT Cerumo	Toyota GR	Toyota GR Supra GT500	Toyota RI4AG 2.0 L Turbo I4	38	(Japan) Hiroaki Ishiura	B	All
(Japan) TGR Team SARD	Toyota GR	Toyota GR Supra GT500	Toyota RI4AG 2.0 L Turbo I4	39	(Finland) Heikki Kovalainen	B	All
(Japan) TGR Team SARD	Toyota GR	Toyota GR Supra GT500	Toyota RI4AG 2.0 L Turbo I4	39	(Japan) Yuichi Nakayama	B	All
(Japan) Modulo Nakajima Racing	Honda	Honda NSX-GT	Honda HR-420E 2.0 L Turbo I4	64	(Japan) Takuya Izawa	D	All
(Japan) Modulo Nakajima Racing	Honda	Honda NSX-GT	Honda HR-420E 2.0 L Turbo I4	64	(Japan) Hiroki Otsu	D	All

=== GT300 ===
Team	Make	Car	Engine	No.	Drivers	Tyre	Rounds
(Japan) muta Racing INGING	Lotus	Lotus Evora MC GT300	GTA V8 4.5 L V8	2	(Japan) Hiroki Katoh	B	All
(Japan) muta Racing INGING	Lotus	Lotus Evora MC GT300	GTA V8 4.5 L V8	2	(Japan) Ryohei Sakaguchi	B	All
(Japan) muta Racing INGING	Lotus	Lotus Evora MC GT300	GTA V8 4.5 L V8	2	(Japan) Kazuto Kotaka	B	2
(Japan) Goodsmile Racing & Team UKYO	Mercedes-AMG	Mercedes-AMG GT3 Evo	Mercedes-AMG M159 6.2 L V8	4	(Japan) Nobuteru Taniguchi	Y	All
(Japan) Goodsmile Racing & Team UKYO	Mercedes-AMG	Mercedes-AMG GT3 Evo	Mercedes-AMG M159 6.2 L V8	4	(Japan) Tatsuya Kataoka	Y	All
(Japan) Team Mach	Toyota	Toyota 86 MC GT300	GTA V8 4.5 L V8	5	(Japan) Yuya Hiraki	Y	All
(Japan) Team Mach	Toyota	Toyota 86 MC GT300	GTA V8 4.5 L V8	5	(Japan) Reiji Hiraki	Y	All
(Japan) Team LeMans with Motoyama Racing	Audi	Audi R8 LMS Evo	Audi DAR 5.2 L V10	6	(Japan) Satoshi Motoyama	Y	All
(Japan) Team LeMans with Motoyama Racing	Audi	Audi R8 LMS Evo	Audi DAR 5.2 L V10	6	(Japan) Yoshiaki Katayama	Y	All
(Japan) BMW Team Studie × CSL (Note: Car No. 7 entered as BMW Team Studie × CSL, car No. 18 entered as Team UpGarage, and car No. 55 entered as ARTA)	BMW	BMW M6 GT3	BMW S63B44 4.4 L Twin Turbo V8	7	(Japan) Seiji Ara	Y	All
(Japan) BMW Team Studie × CSL	BMW	BMW M6 GT3	BMW S63B44 4.4 L Twin Turbo V8	7	(Japan) Tomohide Yamaguchi	Y	All
(Japan) Pacific - Car Guy Racing	Ferrari	Ferrari 488 GT3 Evo 2020	Ferrari F154CB 3.9 L Twin Turbo V8	9	(Japan) Kei Cozzolino	Y	All
(Japan) Pacific - Car Guy Racing	Ferrari	Ferrari 488 GT3 Evo 2020	Ferrari F154CB 3.9 L Twin Turbo V8	9	(Japan) Takeshi Kimura	Y	1–2, 5–6, 8
(Japan) Pacific - Car Guy Racing	Ferrari	Ferrari 488 GT3 Evo 2020	Ferrari F154CB 3.9 L Twin Turbo V8	9	(Japan) Naoki Yokomizo	Y	3–4, 7
(Japan) GAINER	Nissan	Nissan GT-R Nismo GT3	Nissan VR38DETT 3.8 L Twin Turbo V6	10	(Japan) Kazuki Hoshino	D	All
(Japan) GAINER	Nissan	Nissan GT-R Nismo GT3	Nissan VR38DETT 3.8 L Twin Turbo V6	10	(Japan) Keishi Ishikawa	D	All
(Japan) GAINER	Nissan	Nissan GT-R Nismo GT3	Nissan VR38DETT 3.8 L Twin Turbo V6	11	(Japan) Katsuyuki Hiranaka	D	All
(Japan) GAINER	Nissan	Nissan GT-R Nismo GT3	Nissan VR38DETT 3.8 L Twin Turbo V6	11	(Japan) Hironobu Yasuda	D	All
(Japan) Team UpGarage (Note: Car No. 18 entered as Team UpGarage, and car No. 55 entered as ARTA)	Honda	Honda NSX GT3 Evo	Honda JNC1 3.5 L Twin Turbo V6	18	(Japan) Takashi Kobayashi	Y	All
(Japan) Team UpGarage	Honda	Honda NSX GT3 Evo	Honda JNC1 3.5 L Twin Turbo V6	18	(Japan) Teppei Natori	Y	All
(Japan) ARTA	Honda	Honda NSX GT3 Evo	Honda JNC1 3.5 L Twin Turbo V6	55	(Japan) Shinichi Takagi	B	All
(Japan) ARTA	Honda	Honda NSX GT3 Evo	Honda JNC1 3.5 L Twin Turbo V6	55	(Japan) Ren Sato	B	All
(Japan) Audi Team Hitotsuyama	Audi	Audi R8 LMS Evo	Audi DAR 5.2 L V10	21	(Japan) Shintaro Kawabata	Y	All
(Japan) Audi Team Hitotsuyama	Audi	Audi R8 LMS Evo	Audi DAR 5.2 L V10	21	(Japan) Takuro Shinohara	Y	All
(Japan) R'Qs Motor Sports	Mercedes-AMG	Mercedes-AMG GT3 Evo	Mercedes-AMG M159 6.2 L V8	22	(Japan) Hisashi Wada	Y	1–4, 6
(Japan) R'Qs Motor Sports	Mercedes-AMG	Mercedes-AMG GT3 Evo	Mercedes-AMG M159 6.2 L V8	22	(Japan) Masaki Jyonai	Y	1–4, 6
(Japan) R'Qs Motor Sports	Mercedes-AMG	Mercedes-AMG GT3 Evo	Mercedes-AMG M159 6.2 L V8	22	(Japan) Ryosei Yamashita	Y	2
(Japan) Arnage Racing	Mercedes-AMG	Mercedes-AMG GT3 Evo	Mercedes-AMG M159 6.2 L V8	50	(Japan) Masaki Kano	Y	All
(Japan) Arnage Racing	Mercedes-AMG	Mercedes-AMG GT3 Evo	Mercedes-AMG M159 6.2 L V8	50	(Japan) Masataka Yanagida	Y	All
(Japan) / Hoppy Team Tsuchiya (Note: Car No. 25 entered as Team Tsuchiya, and car No. 244 entered as Max Racing); (Japan) / Max Racing	Porsche	Porsche 911 GT3 R	Porsche M97/80 4.2 L F6	25	(Japan) Takamitsu Matsui	Y	All
(Japan) / Hoppy Team Tsuchiya; (Japan) / Max Racing	Porsche	Porsche 911 GT3 R	Porsche M97/80 4.2 L F6	25	(Japan) Kimiya Sato	Y	All
(Japan) / Hoppy Team Tsuchiya; (Japan) / Max Racing	Toyota GR	Toyota GR Supra GT300	Toyota 2UR-GSE 5.4 L V8	244	(Japan) Atsushi Miyake	Y	All
(Japan) / Hoppy Team Tsuchiya; (Japan) / Max Racing	Toyota GR	Toyota GR Supra GT300	Toyota 2UR-GSE 5.4 L V8	244	(Japan) Yuui Tsutsumi	Y	All
(Japan) apr	Toyota GR	Toyota GR Sport Prius PHV apr GT	Toyota 2UR-GSE 5.4 L V8	30	(Japan) Hiroaki Nagai	Y	All
(Japan) apr	Toyota GR	Toyota GR Sport Prius PHV apr GT	Toyota 2UR-GSE 5.4 L V8	30	(Japan) Manabu Orido	Y	All
(Japan) apr	Toyota GR	Toyota GR Sport Prius PHV apr GT	Toyota 2UR-GSE 5.4 L V8	30	(Japan) Yuta Kamimura	Y	2
(Japan) apr	Toyota GR	Toyota GR Sport Prius PHV apr GT	Toyota 2UR-GSE 5.4 L Hybrid V8	31	(Japan) Koki Saga	B	All
(Japan) apr	Toyota GR	Toyota GR Sport Prius PHV apr GT	Toyota 2UR-GSE 5.4 L Hybrid V8	31	(Japan) Yuhki Nakayama	B	All
(Japan) Yogibo Drago Corse	Honda	Honda NSX GT3 Evo	Honda JNC1 3.5 L Twin Turbo V6	34	(Japan) Ryō Michigami	Y	All
(Japan) Yogibo Drago Corse	Honda	Honda NSX GT3 Evo	Honda JNC1 3.5 L Twin Turbo V6	34	(Japan) Shogo Mitsuyama	Y	All
arto Team Thailand (Note: For the first 2 rounds of the series the team run under arto Ping An Team Thailand, and for the rest of season under arto Team Thailand.)	Lexus	Lexus RC F GT3	Lexus 2UR-GSE 5.4 L V8	35	(United Kingdom) Sean Walkinshaw	Y	All
arto Team Thailand	Lexus	Lexus RC F GT3	Lexus 2UR-GSE 5.4 L V8	35	(France) Giuliano Alesi	Y	All
(Japan) NILZZ Racing	Nissan	Nissan GT-R Nismo GT3	Nissan VR38DETT 3.8 L Twin Turbo V6	48	(Japan) Yuki Tanaka	Y	All
(Japan) NILZZ Racing	Nissan	Nissan GT-R Nismo GT3	Nissan VR38DETT 3.8 L Twin Turbo V6	48	(Japan) Ryuichiro Tomita	Y	1, 4
(Japan) NILZZ Racing	Nissan	Nissan GT-R Nismo GT3	Nissan VR38DETT 3.8 L Twin Turbo V6	48	(Japan) Taiyou Iida	Y	2, 3, 5, 7–8
(Japan) NILZZ Racing	Nissan	Nissan GT-R Nismo GT3	Nissan VR38DETT 3.8 L Twin Turbo V6	48	(Japan) Yudai Uchida	Y	6
(Japan) Arnage Racing	Mercedes-AMG	Mercedes-AMG GT3 Evo	Mercedes-AMG M159 6.2 L V8	50	(Japan) Masaki Kano	Y	All
(Japan) Arnage Racing	Mercedes-AMG	Mercedes-AMG GT3 Evo	Mercedes-AMG M159 6.2 L V8	50	(Japan) Masataka Yanagida	Y	All
(Japan) Saitama Toyopet GreenBrave	Toyota GR	Toyota GR Supra GT300	Toyota 2UR-GSE 5.4 L V8	52	(Japan) Hiroki Yoshida	B	All
(Japan) Saitama Toyopet GreenBrave	Toyota GR	Toyota GR Supra GT300	Toyota 2UR-GSE 5.4 L V8	52	(Japan) Kohta Kawaai	B	1–3, 5–8
(Japan) Saitama Toyopet GreenBrave	Toyota GR	Toyota GR Supra GT300	Toyota 2UR-GSE 5.4 L V8	52	(Japan) Taku Bamba	B	4
(Japan) Kondo Racing	Nissan	Nissan GT-R Nismo GT3	Nissan VR38DETT 3.8 L Twin Turbo V6	56	(Japan) Kiyoto Fujinami	Y	All
(Japan) Kondo Racing	Nissan	Nissan GT-R Nismo GT3	Nissan VR38DETT 3.8 L Twin Turbo V6	56	(Brazil) João Paulo de Oliveira	Y	All
(Japan) LM Corsa	Toyota GR	Toyota GR Supra GT300	Toyota 2UR-GSE 5.4 L V8	60	(Japan) Hiroki Yoshimoto	D	All
(Japan) LM Corsa	Toyota GR	Toyota GR Supra GT300	Toyota 2UR-GSE 5.4 L V8	60	(Japan) Shunsuke Kohno	D	All
(Japan) R&D Sport	Subaru	Subaru BRZ GT300 (ZD8)	Subaru EJ20 2.0 L Turbo F4	61	(Japan) Takuto Iguchi	D	All
(Japan) R&D Sport	Subaru	Subaru BRZ GT300 (ZD8)	Subaru EJ20 2.0 L Turbo F4	61	(Japan) Hideki Yamauchi	D	All
(Japan) K2 R&D LEON Racing	Mercedes-AMG	Mercedes-AMG GT3 Evo	Mercedes-AMG M159 6.2 L V8	65	(Japan) Naoya Gamou	B	All
(Japan) K2 R&D LEON Racing	Mercedes-AMG	Mercedes-AMG GT3 Evo	Mercedes-AMG M159 6.2 L V8	65	(Japan) Togo Suganami	B	All
(Japan) JLOC	Lamborghini	Lamborghini Huracán GT3 Evo	Lamborghini DGF 5.2 L V10	87	(Japan) Kosuke Matsuura	Y	All
(Japan) JLOC	Lamborghini	Lamborghini Huracán GT3 Evo	Lamborghini DGF 5.2 L V10	87	(Japan) Natsu Sakaguchi	Y	All
(Japan) JLOC	Lamborghini	Lamborghini Huracán GT3 Evo	Lamborghini DGF 5.2 L V10	88	(Japan) Takashi Kogure	Y	All
(Japan) JLOC	Lamborghini	Lamborghini Huracán GT3 Evo	Lamborghini DGF 5.2 L V10	88	(Japan) Yuya Motojima	Y	All
(Japan) K-tunes Racing	Lexus	Lexus RC F GT3	Lexus 2UR-GSE 5.4 L V8	96	(Japan) Morio Nitta	D	All
(Japan) K-tunes Racing	Lexus	Lexus RC F GT3	Lexus 2UR-GSE 5.4 L V8	96	(Japan) Hibiki Taira	D	1–3
(Japan) K-tunes Racing	Lexus	Lexus RC F GT3	Lexus 2UR-GSE 5.4 L V8	96	(Japan) Kazuto Kotaka	D	4–5
(Japan) K-tunes Racing	Lexus	Lexus RC F GT3	Lexus 2UR-GSE 5.4 L V8	96	(Japan) Sena Sakaguchi	D	6–8
(Japan) Tomei Sports	Nissan	Nissan GT-R Nismo GT3	Nissan VR38DETT 3.8 L Twin Turbo V6	360	(Japan) Takayuki Aoki	Y	All
(Japan) Tomei Sports	Nissan	Nissan GT-R Nismo GT3	Nissan VR38DETT 3.8 L Twin Turbo V6	360	(Japan) Yudai Uchida	Y	1–5
(Japan) Tomei Sports	Nissan	Nissan GT-R Nismo GT3	Nissan VR38DETT 3.8 L Twin Turbo V6	360	(Japan) Atsushi Tanaka	Y	2, 6, 8
(Japan) Tomei Sports	Nissan	Nissan GT-R Nismo GT3	Nissan VR38DETT 3.8 L Twin Turbo V6	360	(Japan) Takuya Otaki	Y	7

=== Vehicle changes ===
==== GT300 Class ====
- INGING Motorsport and Cars Tokai Dream28 merged into a collaborative entry in 2021, known as muta Racing INGING. The team retained the Lotus Evora MC GT300 vehicle, driver Hiroki Katoh, chief engineer Shintaro Watanabe, and the number 2 plate of Cars Tokai Dream28's entry. INGING brought on their Bridgestone tyre contract, title sponsor muta, and driver Ryohei Sakaguchi.
- Both LM Corsa and Max Racing switched from the FIA-GT3 specification Lexus RC F GT3 to the GT300 specification fifth-generation Toyota GR Supra for the 2021 season.
- Team LeMans returned to Super GT after a one-year absence, fielding an Audi R8 LMS Evo under the 'Team LeMans with Motoyama Racing' banner while also transfer from the GT500 to GT300 class.
- R&D Sport changed from the first-generation Subaru BRZ (ZC6) to the new second-generation BRZ (ZD8) for the 2021 season.
- Car Guy Racing returned to Super GT after a two-year absence, partnering with Pacific Racing Team to field a Ferrari 488 GT3 under the Pacific CarGuy Racing banner.

=== Entrant changes ===
==== GT500 Class ====
- Honda: Honda announced their Super GT driver line-up on On 15 January 2020.
  - Toshiki Oyu will be stepping up to GT500 to join Team Red Bull Mugen, replacing Hideki Mutoh. Team Red Bull Mugen changed tyre suppliers from Yokohama to Dunlop. Dunlop will supply multiple GT500 teams for the first time since 2010. Hirokatsu Tanaka replaced Shinji Nakano as team director.
  - Stanley Electric replaced the defunct Raybrig brand as the title sponsor for Team Kunimitsu.
  - Astemo, a joint venture between Hitachi and Honda, replaced the defunct Keihin brand as title sponsor for Astemo Real Racing.
- Nissan: Nissan's GT500 line-up was announced on 18 January 2020.
  - Nobuharu Matsushita, who made his series debut as a replacement driver for the injured Shinichi Takagi last year, signed with Nissan to compete for Team Impul alongside Kazuki Hiramine.
  - Daiki Sasaki joined Kondo Racing for the first time since 2016, partnering with Mitsunori Takaboshi.
  - Jann Mardenborough was not retained by Nissan for the 2021 season.
- Toyota: Toyota Gazoo Racing announced their Super GT driver line-up on 22 January 2020.
  - At TOM's Racing, Sacha Fenestraz transferred from the number 36 to the number 37 entry, replacing Nick Cassidy, who left the series to compete in Formula E with Envision Virgin Racing. Sho Tsuboi transferred from TGR Team ROOKIE to the number 36 TOM's team.
  - TGR Team ROOKIE became a self-sufficient team after being operated by Team Cerumo in 2020. Eneos replaced Wako's as their title sponsor. 2019 champion Kenta Yamashita returned to Super GT full-time, replacing Tsuboi at TGR Team ROOKIE - and reunited with former Team LeMans teammate Kazuya Oshima in the No. 14 car.

==== GT300 Class ====
- Three-time GT500 champion Satoshi Motoyama returned to the series after retiring from GT500 at the end of 2018, driving for the newly incorporated Team LeMans with Motoyama Racing.
- Two-time GT500 and GT300 champion Masataka Yanagida joined pro-am Mercedes-AMG customer team Arnage Racing, racing alongside amateur driver Masaki Kano.
- Former Ferrari Driver Academy prospect and Formula 2 driver Giuliano Alesi made his GT300 debut with arto Team Thailand. Alesi was initially signed as the team's third driver, but competed in all eight rounds after Nattapong Hortongkum was unable to enter Japan for a second consecutive year.
- 2019 F4 Japanese champion and 2020 French F4 Championship runner-up Ren Sato made his GT300 debut with Autobacs Racing Team Aguri, replacing Toshiki Oyu.
- Super Formula Lights driver Teppei Natori made his GT300 debut, replacing Kosuke Matsuura at Honda customer Team UPGarage.
- Yuui Tsutsumi, signed with Max Racing to compete full-time in 2021, after driving for three different teams (including Max Racing) as a substitute driver throughout 2020.
- 2020 TCR Japan Series champion Takuro Shinohara made his full-time GT300 debut with Audi Team Hitotsuyama, after competing part-time in 2020 for two different teams.
- JLOC signed GT500 veteran Kosuke Matsuura and GT300 podium finisher Natsu Sakaguchi to drive their number 87 Lamborghini Huracán GT3.
- Misato Haga, former team principal of Direxiv and the first woman to win a GT300 Championship as a team director, became the new team director of Drago Corse. Yogibo became the team's new title sponsor. Veteran GT300 driver Shogo Mitsuyama joined Yogibo Drago Corse, alongside owner/driver Ryō Michigami.
- Japanese F4 runner-up Reiji Hiraki made his GT300 debut with Team Mach, driving alongside his older brother Yuya.
- Super Formula Lights graduate Yoshiaki Katayama made his GT300 debut with Team LeMans with Motoyama Racing.
- D'station Racing withdrew from Super GT at the end of the 2020 season, as the team concentrate on FIA World Endurance Championship campaign. While Pacific Racing Team linked up with CarGuy Racing, the owner Takeshi Kimura race with Kei Cozzolino.
- After 2 years in the series, Hong Kong team X Works discontinue their Japanese campaign.

=== Mid-season changes ===
==== GT500 Class ====
- Sacha Fenestraz missed the first five races of the season due to difficulties acquiring a Japanese visa. Sena Sakaguchi replaced him at TGR Team KeePer TOM's for these five races, before Fenestraz returned for the sixth round at Autopolis.
- Tadasuke Makino missed the first race of the season due to meningitis. Hideki Mutoh replaced him at Team Kunimitsu for the first race at Okayama. Makino returned for the Fuji 500km in May, entered as a third driver alongside Yamamoto and Mutoh. From the following round at Motegi, Makino returned to the cockpit on a full-time basis.
- From the third race of the season at Motegi, TGR Team ZENT Cerumo chief engineer Kotaro Tanaka had taken over as team director from ace driver Yuji Tachikawa.

==== GT300 Class ====
- With Sena Sakaguchi driving in GT500, reigning FIA F4 Japanese Champion Hibiki Taira was called up to replace Sakaguchi at K-Tunes Racing. Taira drove in the first three races of the season.
- Before the fourth race at Suzuka, Taira was replaced at K-tunes Racing by Kazuto Kotaka, due to an undisclosed illness, which was later revealed to be a COVID-19 infection. Kotaka also drove in the fifth race at Sugo.
- Kohta Kawaai missed the fourth race of the season at Suzuka due to a positive COVID-19 test. 2011 GT300 champion Taku Bamba replaced Kawaai at Saitama Toyopet GreenBrave.
- 2012 GT300 champion Naoki Yokomizo replaced Takeshi Kimura at Pacific CarGuy Racing for rounds three, four, and seven due to Kimura's driving commitments in the FIA World Endurance Championship.
- arto Ping An Team Thailand changed its entry name back to arto Team Thailand after the first two races of the season, after Ping An Insurance abruptly ended its sponsorship of the team.
- R'Qs Motor Sports withdrew from the final two rounds after their car was heavily damaged in an accident during the sixth round at Autopolis.

== Results ==
The race at Suzuka Circuit was still promoted as the third round of the season, despite taking place after the July race at Twin Ring Motegi and being the fourth race of the season chronologically. Likewise, the July race at Motegi was still promoted as the fourth round of the championship, even though it was now the third race of the season chronologically. Drivers credited with winning Pole Position for their respective teams are indicated in bold text.

Round	Circuit	Date	Class	Pole position	Race winner
1	Okayama International Circuit	11 April	GT500	No. 37 TGR Team Keeper TOM'S	No. 14 TGR Team Eneos ROOKIE
1	Okayama International Circuit	11 April	GT500	(Japan) Ryo Hirakawa **(Japan) Sena Sakaguchi**	**(Japan) Kazuya Oshima** **(Japan) Kenta Yamashita**
1	Okayama International Circuit	11 April	GT300	No. 11 GAINER	No. 56 Kondo Racing
1	Okayama International Circuit	11 April	GT300	**(Japan) Katsuyuki Hiranaka** (Japan) Hironobu Yasuda	**(Japan) Kiyoto Fujinami** **(Brazil) Joao Paulo de Oliveira**
2	Fuji Speedway	4 May	GT500	No. 19 TGR Team WedsSport Bandoh	No. 17 Astemo REAL Racing
2	Fuji Speedway	4 May	GT500	(Japan) Yuji Kunimoto **(Japan) Ritomo Miyata**	**(Belgium) Bertrand Baguette** **(Japan) Koudai Tsukakoshi**
2	Fuji Speedway	4 May	GT300	No. 61 R&D Sport	No. 60 LM Corsa
2	Fuji Speedway	4 May	GT300	(Japan) Takuto Iguchi **(Japan) Hideki Yamauchi**	**(Japan) Shunsuke Kohno** **(Japan) Hiroki Yoshimoto**
3	Twin Ring Motegi	18 July	GT500	No. 1 Team Kunimitsu	No. 1 Team Kunimitsu
3	Twin Ring Motegi	18 July	GT500	**(Japan) Naoki Yamamoto** (Japan) Tadasuke Makino	**(Japan) Naoki Yamamoto** **(Japan) Tadasuke Makino**
3	Twin Ring Motegi	18 July	GT300	No. 10 GAINER	No. 2 muta Racing INGING
3	Twin Ring Motegi	18 July	GT300	(Japan) Katsuyuki Hiranaka **(Japan) Hironobu Yasuda**	**(Japan) Hiroki Katoh** **(Japan) Ryohei Sakaguchi**
4	Suzuka Circuit	22 August	GT500	No. 64 Modulo Nakajima Racing	No. 23 NISMO
4	Suzuka Circuit	22 August	GT500	**(Japan) Takuya Izawa** (Japan) Hiroki Otsu	**(Japan) Tsugio Matsuda** **(Italy) Ronnie Quintarelli**
4	Suzuka Circuit	22 August	GT300	No. 61 R&D Sport	No. 244 Max Racing
4	Suzuka Circuit	22 August	GT300	(Japan) Takuto Iguchi **(Japan) Hideki Yamauchi**	**(Japan) Atsushi Miyake** **(Japan) Yuui Tsutsumi**
5	Sportsland Sugo	12 September	GT500	No. 8 ARTA	No. 12 Team Impul
5	Sportsland Sugo	12 September	GT500	(Japan) Tomoki Nojiri **(Japan) Nirei Fukuzumi**	**(Japan) Kazuki Hiramine** **(Japan) Nobuharu Matsushita**
5	Sportsland Sugo	12 September	GT300	No. 61 R&D Sport	No. 61 R&D Sport
5	Sportsland Sugo	12 September	GT300	(Japan) Takuto Iguchi **(Japan) Hideki Yamauchi**	**(Japan) Takuto Iguchi** **(Japan) Hideki Yamauchi**
6	Autopolis	24 October	GT500	No. 16 Team Red Bull Mugen	No. 8 ARTA
6	Autopolis	24 October	GT500	**(Japan) Ukyo Sasahara** (Japan) Toshiki Oyu	**(Japan) Tomoki Nojiri** **(Japan) Nirei Fukuzumi**
6	Autopolis	24 October	GT300	No. 31 apr	No. 31 apr
6	Autopolis	24 October	GT300	(Japan) Yuhki Nakayama **(Japan) Koki Saga**	**(Japan) Yuhki Nakayama** **(Japan) Koki Saga**
7	Twin Ring Motegi	7 November	GT500	No. 19 TGR Team WedsSport Bandoh	No. 8 ARTA
7	Twin Ring Motegi	7 November	GT500	(Japan) Yuji Kunimoto **(Japan) Ritomo Miyata**	**(Japan) Tomoki Nojiri** **(Japan) Nirei Fukuzumi**
7	Twin Ring Motegi	7 November	GT300	No. 18 Team UpGarage	No. 21 Audi Sport Team Hitotsuyama
7	Twin Ring Motegi	7 November	GT300	(Japan) Takashi Kobayashi **(Japan) Teppei Natori**	**(Japan) Shintaro Kawabata** **(Japan) Takuro Shinohara**
8	Fuji Speedway	28 November	GT500	No. 14 TGR Team Eneos ROOKIE	No. 36 TGR Team au TOM'S
8	Fuji Speedway	28 November	GT500	(Japan) Kazuya Oshima **(Japan) Kenta Yamashita**	**(Japan) Yuhi Sekiguchi** **(Japan) Sho Tsuboi**
8	Fuji Speedway	28 November	GT300	No. 61 R&D Sport	No. 60 LM Corsa
8	Fuji Speedway	28 November	GT300	(Japan) Takuto Iguchi **(Japan) Hideki Yamauchi**	**(Japan) Shunsuke Kohno** **(Japan) Hiroki Yoshimoto**

== Championship standings ==
=== Drivers' championships ===
Scoring system

Position	1st	2nd	3rd	4th	5th	6th	7th	8th	9th	10th	Pole
Points	20	15	11	8	6	5	4	3	2	1	1

==== GT500 ====
Driver Ranking GT500 2021 Series
Rank	Driver	Team	OKA	FUJ	MOT	SUZ	SUG	AUT	MOT	FUJ	Points
1	(Japan) Yuhi Sekiguchi (Japan) Sho Tsuboi	(Japan) No. 36 TGR Team au TOM'S	2	13	3	5	4	10	8	1	64
2	(Japan) Nirei Fukuzumi (Japan) Tomoki Nojiri	(Japan) No. 8 ARTA	7	8	5	11	10	1	1	6	60
3	(Japan) Naoki Yamamoto	(Japan) No. 1 Team Kunimitsu	8	4	1	4	2	6	12	14	60
4	(Japan) Tadasuke Makino	(Japan) No. 1 Team Kunimitsu		4	1	4	2	6	12	14	57
5	(Japan) Kazuya Oshima (Japan) Kenta Yamashita	(Japan) No. 14 TGR Team Eneos ROOKIE	1	2	13	12	12†	11	6	3	52
6	(Belgium) Bertrand Baguette (Japan) Koudai Tsukakoshi	(Japan) No. 17 Astemo REAL Racing	5	1	14	7	3	8	4	Ret	52
7	(Japan) Ryo Hirakawa	(Japan) No. 37 TGR Team KeePer TOM'S	3	3	7	10	11	9	10	2	46
8	(Japan) Kazuki Hiramine (Japan) Nobuharu Matsushita	(Japan) No. 12 Team Impul	10	9	11	6	1	7	3	9	45
9	(Japan) Tsugio Matsuda (Italy) Ronnie Quintarelli	(Japan) No. 23 NISMO	Ret	Ret	9	1	7	3	15	7	41
10	(Japan) Kohei Hirate (Japan) Katsumasa Chiyo	(Japan) No. 3 NDDP Racing with B-Max	9	5	6	2	Ret	4	14	8	39
11	(Japan) Yuji Kunimoto (Japan) Ritomo Miyata	(Japan) No. 19 TGR Team WedsSport Bandoh	12	7	2	13	Ret	13	2	13	36
12	(Japan) Hiroaki Ishiura (Japan) Yuji Tachikawa	(Japan) No. 38 TGR Team ZENT Cerumo	6	Ret	8	8	Ret	2	9	5	34
13	(Finland) Heikki Kovalainen (Japan) Yuichi Nakayama	(Japan) No. 39 TGR Team SARD	4	6	10	14	5	5	11	4	34
14	(Japan) Sena Sakaguchi	(Japan) No. 37 TGR Team KeePer TOM'S	3	3	7	10	11				28
15	(Japan) Mitsunori Takaboshi (Japan) Daiki Sasaki	(Japan) No. 24 Kondo Racing	14	12	12	3	6	14	7	11	20
16	(Japan) Ukyo Sasahara (Japan) Toshiki Oyu	(Japan) No. 16 Team Red Bull Mugen	11	11	4	9	9	Ret	5	10	20
17	(France) Sacha Fenestraz	(Japan) No. 37 TGR Team KeePer TOM'S						9	10	2	18
18	(Japan) Takuya Izawa (Japan) Hiroki Otsu	(Japan) No. 64 Modulo Nakajima Racing	13	10	Ret	Ret	8	12	13	12	5
19	(Japan) Hideki Mutoh	(Japan) No. 1 Team Kunimitsu	8	4							3
Rank	Driver	Team	OKA	FUJ	MOT	SUZ	SUG	AUT	MOT	FUJ	Points

Colour	Result
Gold	Winner
Silver	Second place
Bronze	Third place
Green	Points classification
Blue	Non-points classification
Blue	Non-classified finish (NC)
Purple	Retired, not classified (Ret)
Red	Did not qualify (DNQ)
Red	Did not pre-qualify (DNPQ)
Black	Disqualified (DSQ)
White	Did not start (DNS)
White	Withdrew (WD)
White	Race cancelled (C)
Blank	Did not practice (DNP)
Blank	Did not arrive (DNA)
Blank	Excluded (EX)

==== GT300 ====
Driver Ranking GT300 2021 Series
Rank	Driver	Team	OKA	FUJ	MOT	SUZ	SUG	AUT	MOT	FUJ	Points
1	(Japan) Takuto Iguchi (Japan) Hideki Yamauchi	(Japan) No. 61 R&D Sport	15	2	11	10	1	3	6	3	67
2	(Japan) Kiyoto Fujinami (Brazil) João Paulo de Oliveira	(Japan) No. 56 Kondo Racing	1	7	26	8	3	11	3	5	55
3	(Japan) Hiroki Yoshimoto (Japan) Shunsuke Kohno	(Japan) No. 60 LM Corsa	8	1	12	14	5	19	11	1	49
4	(Japan) Shinichi Takagi (Japan) Ren Sato	(Japan) No. 55 ARTA	26	3	23	7	2	20	2	24	45
5	(Japan) Atsushi Miyake (Japan) Yuui Tsutsumi	(Japan) No. 244 Max Racing	5	11	4	1	9	17	7	7	44
6	(Japan) Naoya Gamou (Japan) Togo Suganami	(Japan) No. 65 K2 R&D LEON Racing	2	4	9	15	14	8	Ret	2	43
7	(Japan) Katsuyuki Hiranaka (Japan) Hironobu Yasuda	(Japan) No. 11 GAINER	4	16	2	26	10	5	8	8	38
8	(Japan) Takashi Kogure (Japan) Yuya Motojima	(Japan) No. 88 JLOC	9	6	24	2	7	12	4	23	34
9	(Japan) Hiroki Yoshida	(Japan) No. 52 Saitama Toyopet GreenBrave	3	27	3	18	21	3	9	9	34
9	(Japan) Kohta Kawaai	(Japan) No. 52 Saitama Toyopet GreenBrave	3	27	3		21	3	9	9	34
10	(Japan) Nobuteru Taniguchi (Japan) Tatsuya Kataoka	(Japan) No. 4 Goodsmile Racing & Team UKYO	14	8	5	3	23	6	Ret	4	33
11	(Japan) Hiroki Katoh (Japan) Ryohei Sakaguchi	(Japan) No. 2 muta Racing INGING	Ret	10	1	9	16	18	24	12	23
12	(Japan) Morio Nitta	(Japan) No. 96 K-tunes Racing	6	14	13	17	8	2	14	19	23
13	(Japan) Koki Saga (Japan) Yuhki Nakayama	(Japan) No. 31 apr	19	28	18	24	13	1	22	14	21
14	(Japan) Takamitsu Matsui (Japan) Kimiya Sato	(Japan) No. 25 Hoppy Team Tsuchiya	7	13	6	23	19	10	5	6	21
15	(Japan) Shintaro Kawabata (Japan) Takuro Shinohara	(Japan) No. 21 Audi Team Hitotsuyama	13	17	16	21	25	15	1	17	20
16	(Japan) Sena Sakaguchi	(Japan) No. 96 K-tunes Racing						2	14	19	15
17	(Japan) Kei Cozzolino	(Japan) No. 9 Pacific - Car Guy Racing	23	25	6	4	15	9	19	13	14
18	(Japan) Kazuki Hoshino (Japan) Keishi Ishikawa	(Japan) No. 10 GAINER	10	5	14	11	26	7	10	10	13
19	(Japan) Naoki Yokomizo	(Japan) No. 9 Pacific - Car Guy Racing			6	4			19		12
20	(Japan) Kosuke Matsuura (Japan) Natsu Sakaguchi	(Japan) No. 87 JLOC	21	15	Ret	16	4	25	Ret	15	8
21	(Japan) Hiroaki Nagai (Japan) Manabu Orido	(Japan) No. 30 apr	Ret	18	8	6	20	23	16	16	8
22	(Japan) Yuya Hiraki (Japan) Reiji Hiraki	(Japan) No. 5 Team Mach	25	12	27	5	22	21	18	25	6
23	(Japan) Ryō Michigami (Japan) Shogo Mitsuyama	(Japan) No. 34 Yogibo Drago Corse	16	19	17	13	6	22	12	11	5
24	(Japan) Hibiki Taira	(Japan) No. 96 K-tunes Racing	6	14	13						5
25	(Japan) Takashi Kobayashi (Japan) Teppei Natori	(Japan) No. 18 Team UpGarage	11	9	10	DNS	12	16	Ret	Ret	4
26	(Japan) Kazuto Kotaka	(Japan) No. 2 muta Racing INGING		10							3
26	(Japan) Kazuto Kotaka	(Japan) No. 96 K-tunes Racing				17	8				3
27	(Japan) Takeshi Kimura	(Japan) No. 9 Pacific - Car Guy Racing	23	25			15	9		13	2
–	(Japan) Seiji Ara (Japan) Tomohide Yamaguchi	(Japan) No. 7 BMW Team Studie × CSL	17	20	25	25	11	13	15	Ret	0
–	(Japan) Satoshi Motoyama (Japan) Yoshiaki Katayama	(Japan) No. 6 Team LeMans with Motoyama Racing	22	23	19	12	18	24	20	18	0
–	(Japan) Yuki Tanaka	(Japan) No. 48 NILZZ Racing	12	26	20	27	27	Ret	23	21	0
–	(Japan) Ryuichiro Tomita	(Japan) No. 48 NILZZ Racing	12			27					0
–	(Japan) Takayuki Aoki	(Japan) No. 360 Tomei Sports	Ret	24	15	22	DSQ	26	13	22	0
–	(Japan) Takuya Otaki	(Japan) No. 360 Tomei Sports							13		0
–	(Japan) Masaki Kano (Japan) Masataka Yanagida	(Japan) No. 50 Arnage Racing	18	21	22	19	24	14	21	DNS	0
–	(Japan) Yudai Uchida	(Japan) No. 360 Tomei Sports	Ret	24	15	22	DSQ				0
–	(Japan) Yudai Uchida	(Japan) No. 48 NILZZ Racing						Ret			0
–	(United Kingdom) Sean Walkinshaw (France) Giuliano Alesi	No. 35 arto Team Thailand	24	22	Ret	20	17	Ret	17	20	0
–	(Japan) Yuta Kamimura	(Japan) No. 30 apr		18							0
–	(Japan) Taku Bamba	(Japan) No. 52 Saitama Toyopet GreenBrave				18					0
–	(Japan) Taiyou Iida	(Japan) No. 48 NILZZ Racing		26		20	27		23	21	0
–	(Japan) Hisashi Wada (Japan) Masaki Jyonai	(Japan) No. 22 R'Qs Motor Sports	20	Ret	21	28		Ret			0
–	(Japan) Atsushi Tanaka	(Japan) No. 360 Tomei Sports		24				26		22	0
–	(Japan) Ryosei Yamashita	(Japan) No. 22 R'Qs Motor Sports		Ret							0
Rank	Driver	Team	OKA	FUJ	MOT	SUZ	SUG	AUT	MOT	FUJ	Points
