= Kei Cozzolino =

Italian racing driver (born 1987)

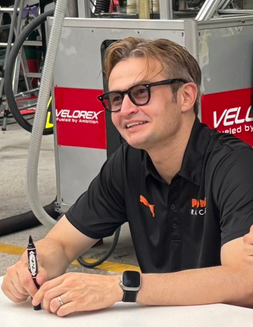
- Cozzolino at the 2025 Super GT Malaysia Festival
- Nationality: (Japan) Japanese (Italy) Italian
- Born: Kei Francesco Cozzolino; 9 November 1987 (age 39) Shinjuku, Tokyo, Japan

FIA World Endurance Championship
- Categorisation: FIA Silver (until 2019); FIA Gold (2020–)
- Years active: 2019 – 2023
- Teams: AF Corse

Championship titles
- GT World Challenge Asia; Asian Le Mans Series; Lamborghini Super Trofeo; Esso Formula Toyota

Awards
- 2022 GT World Challenge Asia Overall Champion; 2018 Asian Le Mans GT Champion; 2017 Lamborghini Super Trofeo Asia Champion; 2007 Esso Formula Toyota Champion

Kei Francesco Cozzolino (born 9 November 1987 in Shinjuku, Tokyo) is a Japanese-Italian professional racing driver. A Ferrari specialist, he competes in sports car racing events including the FIA World Endurance Championship (WEC), 24 Hours of Le Mans, 24 Hours of Daytona and the Asian Le Mans Series with AF Corse. Cozzolino joined the 2024 Super GT series, driving a Ferrari 296 GT3 for Ponos Racing.

== Early life ==
Cozzolino was born in Ichigaya, Shinjuku by Japanese mother and Italian father. He grew up in Japan and had his first experience with racing at eight years old, thanks to his dad's passion for cars. When Cozzolino turned 14, they moved to Florence, Italy, where he studied at an international school.

== Racing career ==
=== Karting ===
Cozzolino started karting at the age of nine. He competed and won in various competitions in classes in Japan and around the world. His karting career ended in 2005 when he switched to racing cars.

=== Junior Formula ===
In 2006, Cozzolino made his debut in auto racing, in the Formula Toyota series, during the second round of the championship at Sendai Hi-Land Raceway. Cozzolino finished tenth out of eleven finishers.

In 2007, Cozzolino competed in the Formula Challenge Japan and the Formula Toyota classes. In the Formula Challenge Japan, supported by Nissan, Toyota and Honda, he won one race. All the drivers who entered both the Formula Toyota and Formula Challenge Japan series were supported by Toyota. This was to promote the Formula Challenge Japan as a replacement of the Formula Toyota after the series disbandment. In the final season of the Formula Toyota, Cozzolino won the title. He was strong all season long, but Keisuke Kunimoto had the lead before the final round of the season. At the final round of the season at Fuji International Speedway, Cozzolino qualified second and Kunimoto sixth. After a strong race, Cozzolino won the race, Kunimoto did not finish the race, thus the championship was decided in Cozzolino's favour.

=== Formula 3 ===
After his 2007 Formula Toyota championship, Cozzolino graduated to the All-Japan Formula Three Championship driving Now Motor Sport in a Dallara F308. As a result of winning the championship, he also tested for the Toyota Tom's Formula Nippon factory team. In his debut year in Formula 3, Cozzolino achieved four podium finishes and a ninth place in the championship. He also participated in the 2008 Macau Grand Prix Formula Three where he finished fifteenth.

For the 2009 season, Cozzolino switched to the only Honda powered entry Toda Racing. He achieved his first win in Formula Three during the round at Twin Ring Motegi. But with the Toyota Tom's team dominating the championship, Cozzolino was best of the rest finishing fourth.

=== Formula Nippon (Super Formula) ===
For the 2010 season, Cozzolino graduated to the Formula Nippon, the highest racing class in Japan. Cozzolino participated in a Toyota powered Swift FN09 entered by Team LeMans. His best finish was a fourth place at Autopolis. During the non-championship Fuji Sprint Cup, he achieved his first pole-position and eventually finished tenth in the standings.

=== World Touring Car Championship ===
After more than a year without racing, Cozzolino was announced as a replacement of Alberto Cerqui for the Guia Race of Macau. 29 drivers attempted to qualify for the event of which 23 could start the race, Cozzolino qualified 22nd. In the first race, he had an accident after seven laps but he was qualified 20th. In the second race, he was the last running driver in 19th place, two laps behind the winning driver.

=== Asian Le Mans Series ===
In 2018–2019, Cozzolino drove the Ferrari 488 GT3 of the privately run CAR GUY team, with teammates Takeshi Kimura and James Calado, won all four legs of the 2018–19 Asian Le Mans Series. The team achieved an auto-invitation to enter into the 2019 24 hours of Le Mans. Cozzolino returned to the series with AF Corse teaming up with Emmanuel Collard and Charlie Samani.

=== 24 Hours of Le Mans ===
Cozzolino has made three appearances in Le Mans (2019, 2020 and 2023). In 2019, he finished fifth in class. At his second attempt in 2020, the Ferrari 488 GTE EVO of the MR Racing team, suffered a mechanical problem early on the race and was forced to be seven laps behind the leader. In the end, the team retired due to a gearbox failure on lap 172. In the 2023 edition, this time with the Kessel Racing's Ferrari 488 GTE EVO number 74, he finished ninth in class.

=== FIA World Endurance Championship ===
Following his remarkable achievement in 2019, Cozzolino secured a contract to compete for the MR Racing team during the FIA WEC 2019–2020 season. He teamed up with Olivier Beretta and Motoaki Ishikawa, and their best performance came in the form of a third-place finish in the opening round at Silverstone. Unfortunately, as the season progressed, MR Racing was forced to withdraw from the series due to the impact of the COVID-19 pandemic. Cozzolino made a return to the series for the final round in Bahrain, this time with Red River Sport.

In 2023, Cozzolino joined forces with Kessel Racing for the 24 Hours of Le Mans and Monza events. Subsequently, he made a comeback with AF Corse to participate in the Fuji and Bahrain rounds.

=== Super GT ===
In 2016, Cozzolino made his debut in the Super GT series upon being promoted as a Lamborghini Young Driver. During that year, he participated in only two rounds, driving the Lamborghini Huracan GT3 as a member of the Direction Racing team.

Cozzolino's return to the series took place in 2020 when he stepped in to replace Nicki Thiim for the Pacific - D'station Racing team, driving the Aston Martin Vantage GT3 alongside the team's star driver, Tomonobu Fujii.

In the year 2021, Cozzolino embarked on a new venture, debuting the Ferrari 488 GT3 Evo with the PACIFIC NAC CARGUY Racing Team, forming a partnership with the 2012 Super GT 300 Champion, Naoki Yokomizo.

Looking ahead to 2024, Cozzolino rejoined the series as part of the PONOS Racing team, piloting the Ferrari 296 GT3. He would team up with Ferrari Factory Driver, Lilou Wadoux.

Following the announcement of Kawabata Shintaro's return to Super GT on June 5, 2026, Kei Cozzolino's profile was removed from the PONOS Racing website. It was later confirmed that he had departed the team.

Later, according to team owner and driver Tsujiko Yorikatsu, the team decided to strengthen its lineup midway through the season in order to improve its competitiveness. The team believed that, in order to make a leap to the front of the field, it needed "new stimulation" and a "different technical approach."

As a result, the team decided to replace its driver lineup, believing that Kawabata Shintaro would be able to extract more performance from the car and enhance the team's overall competitiveness.

Following PONOS Racing's announcement of a driver lineup change, Kei Cozzolino officially confirmed through his personal website that he would be leaving the team.

He expressed his gratitude to the team for providing him with opportunities to compete in various championships, including Super GT, the Asian Le Mans Series, the 24 Hours of Le Mans, and the SRO Japan Cup. Cozzolino also wished PONOS Racing success as it continues the season under its new structure.

Furthermore, he stated his intention to continue his career as a racing driver both in Japan and internationally while contributing to the development of motorsport.

== Racing record ==
=== Racing career summary ===
Season	Series	Team	Races	Wins	Poles	F/Laps	Podiums	Points	Position
2007	Formula Toyota	Le Beausset Motorsports	7	3	3	?	6	96	**1st**
2008	Japanese Formula 3 Championship	Now Motor Sports	18	0	0	1	3	133	6th
2008	Macau Grand Prix	Now Motor Sports	1	0	0	0	0	N/A	15th
2009	Japanese Formula 3 Championship	Toda Racing	16	1	2	1	4	66	4th
2009	Macau Grand Prix	Toda Racing	1	0	0	0	0	N/A	DNF
2010	Formula Nippon	Team LeMans	8	0	0	0	0	8	10th
2012	World Touring Car Championship	ROAL Motorsport	2	0	0	0	0	0	44th
2016	Super GT - GT300	Lamborghini Team Direction Shift	2	0	0	0	0	0	NC
2016–17	Asian Le Mans Series - GT	VS Racing	3	0	0	0	1	27	9th
2017	Blancpain GT Series Asia - GT3	Car Guy Racing	4	1	0	0	1	25	20th
2017	Super Taikyu Series - ST-X	Car Guy Racing	2	0	0	0	0	32‡	8th‡
2017	Lamborghini Super Trofeo Asia - Pro	Clazzio Racing	12	10	12	9	12	186	**1st**
2018	Super GT - GT300	Car Guy Racing	1	0	1	1	0	0	NC
2018	Super Taikyu Series - ST-X	Car Guy Racing	1	0	0	0	0	7‡	10th‡
2018	Blancpain GT Series Asia - GT3	Car Guy Racing	4	0	0	0	0	0	NC
2018	Lamborghini Super Trofeo Asia - Pro	Clazzio Racing	8	5	5	5	7	110	4th
2018–19	Asian Le Mans Series - GT	Car Guy Racing	4	4	1	0	4	101	**1st**
2019	Lamborghini Super Trofeo Asia - Pro-Am	YH Racing							
2019	24 Hours of Le Mans - LMGTE Am	Car Guy Racing	1	0	0	0	0	N/A	5th
2019–20	FIA World Endurance Championship - LMGTE Am	MR Racing	6	0	0	0	1	45	14th
2019–20	FIA World Endurance Championship - LMGTE Am	Red River Sport	1	0	0	0	0	45	14th
2019–20	Asian Le Mans Series - GT	Car Guy Racing	3	1	1	0	1	46	7th
2020	Super GT - GT300	Pacific – D'station Racing AMR	7	0	0	0	0	2	28th
2020	24 Hours of Le Mans - LMGTE Am	MR Racing	1	0	0	0	0	N/A	DNF
2021	Super GT - GT300	Pacific – Car Guy Racing	8	0	0	0	0	17	14th
2021	Super Taikyu Series - ST-X	Car Guy Racing	1	0	0	0	0	23‡	7th‡
2022	Super GT - GT300	Pacific Car Guy Racing	8	0	0	0	0	8	24th
2022	Le Mans Cup - GT3	AF Corse	1	1	0	0	1	25	11th
2022	GT World Challenge Asia - GT3	Car Guy Racing	8	2	4	6	6	126	**1st**
2023	Le Mans Cup - GT3	AF Corse	7	1	0	1	2	77	**2nd**
2023	FIA World Endurance Championship - LMGTE Am	AF Corse	2	0	0	0	0	0	28th
2023	FIA World Endurance Championship - LMGTE Am	Kessel Racing	1	0	0	0	0	0	28th
2023	24 Hours of Le Mans - LMGTE Am	Kessel Racing	1	0	0	0	0	N/A	9th
2023	GT World Challenge Asia - GT3	Car Guy Racing	6	0	0	0	0	16	27th
2023–24	Asian Le Mans Series - GT	AF Corse	5	0	0	0	0	8	22nd
2024	IMSA SportsCar Championship - GTD	AF Corse	1	0	0	0	1	340	49th
2024	Super GT - GT300	PONOS Racing	8	0	0	0	1	22	12th
2025	IMSA SportsCar Championship - GTD	AF Corse	1	0	0	0	0	167	83rd
2025	Super GT - GT300	PONOS Racing	8	0	0	0	0	34	17th
2025	SRO Japan Cup - GT3 Pro-Am	PONOS Racing	8	2	1	0	5	108	**2nd**
2025	Intercontinental GT Challenge	PONOS Racing	1	0	0	0	0	0	NC
2025–26	Asian Le Mans Series - LMP2	PONOS Racing	5	0	0	0	0	2	18th
2026	Super GT - GT300	PONOS Racing	2	0	0	0	0	0	NC

‡ Team score

=== Complete Formula Toyota results ===
(key) (Races in bold indicate pole position; races in italics indicate fastest lap)

Year	Team	1	2	3	4	5	6	7	Pos.	Points
2007	Le Beausset Motorsports	FUJ; 5	SUZ; 2	MOT; 3	SEN1; 2	**SEN2**; 1	**SUG**; 1	**FUJ**; 1	1st	103

=== Complete Japanese Formula 3 Championship results ===
(key) (Races in bold indicate pole position; races in italics indicate fastest lap)

Year	Team	Engine	1	2	3	4	5	6	7	8	9	10	11	12	13	14	15	16	17	18	Pos.	Points
2008	Now Motor Sports	Toyota	FUJ; 1; 3	FUJ; 2; 5	AUT; 1; 2	AUT; 2; 4	SUZ; 1; 6	SUZ; 2; 3	MOT; 1; 8	MOT; 2; 4	OKA; 1; 7	OKA; 2; 7	SUZ; 1; 5	SUZ; 2 Ret	MOT; 1; 6	MOT; 2; 6	FUJ; 1; 3	FUJ; 2; 4	SUG; 1; 6	SUG; 2 Ret	6th	133
2009	Toda Racing	Honda	FUJ; 1; 4	FUJ; 2; 4	OKA; 1; 4	OKA; 2; 4	SUZ; 1; 5	SUZ; 2; 5	FUJ; 1; 5	FUJ; 2 Ret	**OKA**; **1**; 2	OKA; 2; 5	MOT; 1; 2	**MOT**; **2**; 1	AUT; 1; 4	AUT; 2; 3	SUG; 1; 4	SUG; 2; 4			4th	66

=== Complete Formula Nippon results ===
(key) (Races in bold indicate pole position; races in italics indicate fastest lap)

Year	Entrant	1	2	3	4	5	6	7	8	Pos.	Points
2010	Team LeMans	SUZ; Ret	MOT; 10	FUJ; 8	MOT; 13	SUG; 7	AUT; 4	SUZ1; 13	SUZ2; 14	10th	8

=== Complete World Touring Car Championship results ===
(key) (Races in bold indicate pole position; races in italics indicate fastest lap)

Year	Team	Car	1	2	3	4	5	6	7	8	9	10	11	12	13	14	15	16	17	18	19	20	21	22	23	24	DC	Points
2012	ROAL Motorsport	BMW 320 TC	ITA; 1	ITA; 2	ESP; 1	ESP; 2	MAR; 1	MAR; 2	SVK; 1	SVK; 2	HUN; 1	HUN; 2	AUT; 1	AUT; 2	POR; 1	POR; 2	BRA; 1	BRA; 2	USA; 1	USA; 2	JPN; 1	JPN; 2	CHN; 1	CHN; 2	MAC; 1; 20†	MAC; 2; 19†	44th	0

=== Complete Super GT Series results ===
(key) (Races in bold indicate pole position; races in italics indicate fastest lap)

Year	Team	Car	Class	1	2	3	4	5	6	7	8	9	DC	Points
2016	Lamborghini Team Direction Shift	Lamborghini Huracán GT3	GT300	OKA; 16	FUJ; 17	SUG	FUJ	SUZ	CHA	MOT	MOT		NC	0
2018	CarGuy Racing	Honda NSX GT3	GT300	OKA	**FUJ**; 26	SUZ	BUR	FUJ	SUG	AUT	MOT		NC	0
2020	Pacific – D'station Racing AMR	Aston Martin Vantage AMR GT3	GT300	FUJ; 10	FUJ; 19	SUZ; 10	MOT; 18	FUJ; 24	SUZ; 24	MOT; 25	FUJ		28th	2
2021	Pacific – Car Guy Racing	Ferrari 488 GT3 Evo 2020	GT300	OKA; 23	FUJ; 25	SUZ; 6	MOT; 4	SUG; 15	AUT; 9	MOT; 19	FUJ; 13		14th	17
2022	Pacific Car Guy Racing	Ferrari 488 GT3 Evo 2020	GT300	OKA; 4	FUJ; 23	SUZ; 17	FUJ; 12	SUZ; 11	SUG; Ret	AUT; 13	MOT; 15		24th	8
2024	PONOS Racing	Ferrari 296 GT3	GT300	OKA; 11	FUJ; 9	SUZ; 6	FUJ; 11	SUG; 2	AUT; 24	MOT; 15	SUZ; 21		12th	22
2025	PONOS Racing	Ferrari 296 GT3	GT300	OKA; 12	FUJ; 6	SEP; 14	FS1 (13)	FS2; 9	SUZ; 4	SUG; 21	AUT; 16	MOT; 21	17th	34
2026	PONOS Racing	Ferrari 296 GT3 Evo	GT300	OKA; 20	FUJ; Ret	FUJ	SUZ	SUG	AUT	MOT	MOT		NC	0

^{*} Season still in progress.

=== Complete Asian Le Mans Series results ===
(key) (Races in bold indicate pole position; races in italics indicate fastest lap)

Year	Team	Class	Car	Engine	1	2	3	4	5	6	Pos.	Points
2016–17	VS Racing	GT	Lamborghini Huracán GT3	Lamborghini 5.2 L V10	ZHU; 3	FUJ; 4	CHA; Ret	SEP			9th	27
2018–19	Car Guy Racing	GT	Ferrari 488 GT3	Ferrari F154CB 3.9 L Turbo V8	SHA; 1	**FUJ**; 1	CHA; 1	SEP; 1			1st	101
2019–20	Car Guy Racing	GT	Ferrari 488 GT3	Ferrari F154CB 3.9 L Turbo V8	SHA; 5	BEN; 1	**CHA**; 5	SEP			7th	46
2023–24	AF Corse	GT	Ferrari 296 GT3	Ferrari F163CE 3.0 L Turbo V6	SEP; 1; 21	SEP; 2; 12	DUB; 11	ABU; 1; 16	ABU; 2; 6		22nd	8
2025–26	PONOS Racing	LMP2	Oreca 07	Gibson GK428 4.2 L V8	SEP; 1; 15	SEP; 2 WD	DUB; 1; 12	DUB; 2; 11	ABU; 1; 12	ABU; 2; 9	18th	2

=== Complete GT World Challenge Asia results ===
(key) (Races in bold indicate pole position; races in italics indicate fastest lap)

Year	Team	Car	1	2	3	4	5	6	7	8	9	10	11	12	Pos.	Points
2017	Car Guy Racing	Lamborghini Huracán GT3	SEP 1	SEP 2	BUR 1	BUR 2	SUZ 1; 15	SUZ 2; 12	FUJ 1; 1	FUJ 2; 15	SHA 1	SHA 2	ZHE 1	ZHE 2	20th	25
2018	Car Guy Racing	Lamborghini Huracán GT3	SEP 1	SEP 2	BUR 1	BUR 2	SUZ 1; 16	SUZ 2; 12	FUJ 1; 30	FUJ 2; 18	SHA 1	SHA 2	NIN 1	NIN 2	NC	0
2022	Car Guy Racing	Ferrari 488 GT3 Evo 2020	SEP 1	SEP 2	SUZ 1; 1	**SUZ 2**; 5	**FUJ 1**; 1	**FUJ 2**; 3	SUG 1; 2	**SUG 2**; 3	OKA 1; 2	OKA 2; 12			1st	126
2023	Car Guy Racing	Ferrari 296 GT3	BUR 1	BUR 2	FUJ 1; 12	FUJ 2; 9	SUZ 1	SUZ 2	MOT 1; 7	MOT 2; 24	OKA 1; 6	OKA 2; 16	SEP 1	SEP 2	27th	16

^{*} Season still in progress.

=== Complete FIA World Endurance Championship results ===
(key) (Races in bold indicate pole position; races in italics indicate fastest lap)

Year	Entrant	Class	Car	Engine	1	2	3	4	5	6	7	8	Pos.	Points
2019–20	MR Racing	LMGTE Am	Ferrari 488 GTE Evo	Ferrari F154CB 3.9 L Turbo V8	SIL; 3	FUJ; 4	SHA; 7	BHR; 7	COA; 10	SPA	LMS; Ret		14th	45
2019–20	Red River Sport	LMGTE Am	Ferrari 488 GTE Evo	Ferrari F154CB 3.9 L Turbo V8								BHR; 10	14th	45
2023	Kessel Racing	LMGTE Am	Ferrari 488 GTE Evo	Ferrari F154CB 3.9 L Turbo V8	SEB	POR	SPA	LMS	MNZ; Ret				28th	0
2023	AF Corse	LMGTE Am	Ferrari 488 GTE Evo	Ferrari F154CB 3.9 L Turbo V8						FUJ; 12	BHR; 11		28th	0

=== 24 Hours of Le Mans results ===
Year	Team	Co-Drivers	Car	Class	Laps	Pos.	Class Pos.
2019	(Japan) Car Guy Racing	(Japan) Takeshi Kimura (France) Côme Ledogar	Ferrari 488 GTE	GTE; Am	332	35th	5th
2020	(Japan) MR Racing	(Monaco) Vincent Abril (Japan) Takeshi Kimura	Ferrari 488 GTE Evo	GTE; Am	172	DNF	DNF
2023	(Switzerland) Kessel Racing	(Japan) Yorikatsu Tsujiko (Japan) Naoki Yokomizo	Ferrari 488 GTE Evo	GTE; Am	303	38th	9th

=== Complete IMSA SportsCar Championship results ===
(key) (Races in bold indicate pole position; races in italics indicate fastest lap)

Year	Entrant	Class	Make	Engine	1	2	3	4	5	6	7	8	9	10	Pos.	Points
2024	AF Corse	GTD	Ferrari 296 GT3	Ferrari F163 3.0 L Turbo V6	DAY; 2	SEB	LBH	LGA	WGL	MOS	ELK	VIR	IMS	PET	49th	340
2025	AF Corse	GTD	Ferrari 296 GT3	Ferrari F163 3.0 L Turbo V6	DAY; 16	SEB	LBH	LGA	WGL	MOS	ELK	VIR	IMS	PET	83rd	167

Sporting positions
Preceded by Yuhi Sekiguchi	Formula Toyota; Champion; 2007	Succeeded by None (Series ended)
Preceded by Jesse Krohn; Jun-San Chen	Asian Le Mans Series; GT Champion; 2018–19; With: James Calado & Takeshi Kimura	Succeeded by Incumbent
