= CarGuy Racing =

Japanese auto racing team

(Japan) CarGuy Racing
- Founded: 2015
- Base: Kikugawa
- Team principal(s): Takeshi Kimura
- Current series: Super GT; GT World Challenge Asia; European Le Mans Series; Asian Le Mans Series; 24 Hours of Le Mans
- Former series: FIA World Endurance Championship; Super Taikyu
- Current drivers: (United Kingdom) Zak O'Sullivan; (Japan) Kiyoshi Umegaki; (Japan) Takeshi Kimura; (Japan) Kei Cozzolino
- Teams' Championships: Asian Le Mans Series: 1 (2018–19)

CarGuy Racing is an auto racing team based in Shizuoka Prefecture, Japan, established by Takeshi Kimura in 2015. The team currently competes in the European Le Mans Series under collaboration with Kessel Racing, fielding the No. 9 Ferrari 488 GT3 Evo in the GT300 class and the No. 57 Ferrari 488 GTE Evo in the LMGTE class respectively. Car Guy is also scheduled to compete in GT World Challenge Asia with a Ferrari 488 GT3 Evo in the GT3 class.

The team qualified for the 2019 24 Hours of Le Mans race in the GTE Am category using a Ferrari 488.

== History ==
In 2016, Car Guy Racing entered a Lamborghini Huracán GT3 driven by team owner Takeshi Kimura, Manabu Orido and Malaysian driver Afiq Yazid in the fifth round of that year's Super Taikyu championship, achieving a third place finish on the team's debut. Car Guy later moved to the Super Car Race championship the following year with Car Guy acting as one of the series' primary partners for the season. The team also competed as a wildcard in the Blancpain GT Asia round at Fuji Speedway that year, securing an overall victory with drivers Naoki Yokomizo and Kei Cozzolino.

In 2018, the team first entered into the Super GT championship, where they became one of the first teams to compete with the new Honda NSX GT3 in the GT300 class with Kimura and Cozzolino acting as the team's primary drivers. The team finished 26th out of 29 entrants in the team standings with a best finish of 15th in the opening round at Okayama. Later that year, the team competed in the Asian Le Mans Series with a Ferrari 488 GT3 in the GT class with Kimura, Cozzolino, and British driver James Calado driving for the team. Car Guy went on to dominate the GT class that year, scoring a total of 101 points after winning all four races and gaining an additional point for pole position at their home circuit Fuji Speedway.

In 2023, Car Guy have switched to a new Ferrari 296 GT3 for GT World Challenge Asia, but will continue to campaign various versions of the Ferrari 488 with confirmed entry to Asian Le Mans Series and a "likely" entry to European Le Mans Series.

== Results ==
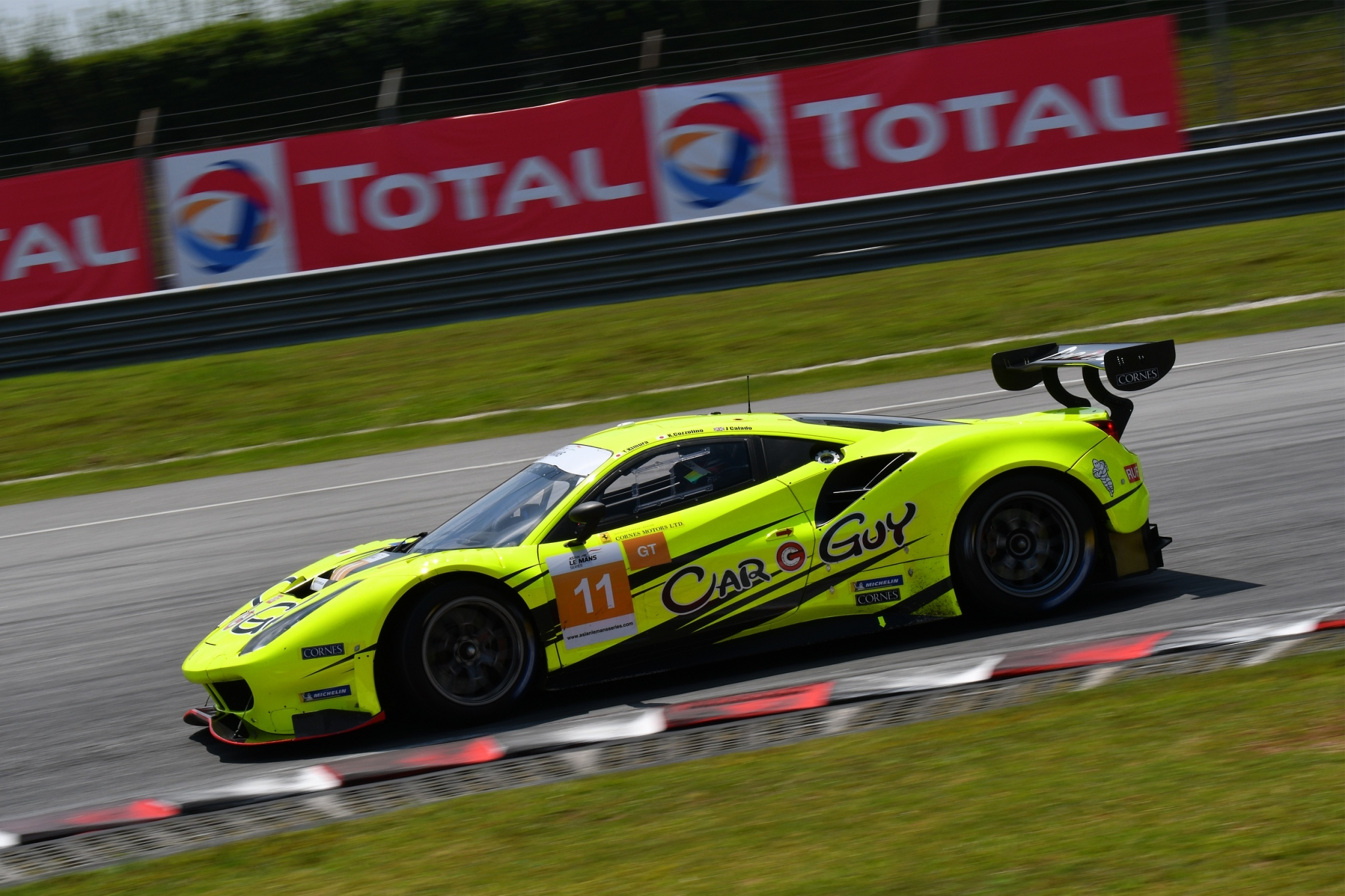
Kei Cozzolino and Takeshi Kimura's Ferrari 488 GT3 for Car Guy Racing that was in the 2019–20 AsLMS series at the Sepang International Circuit.

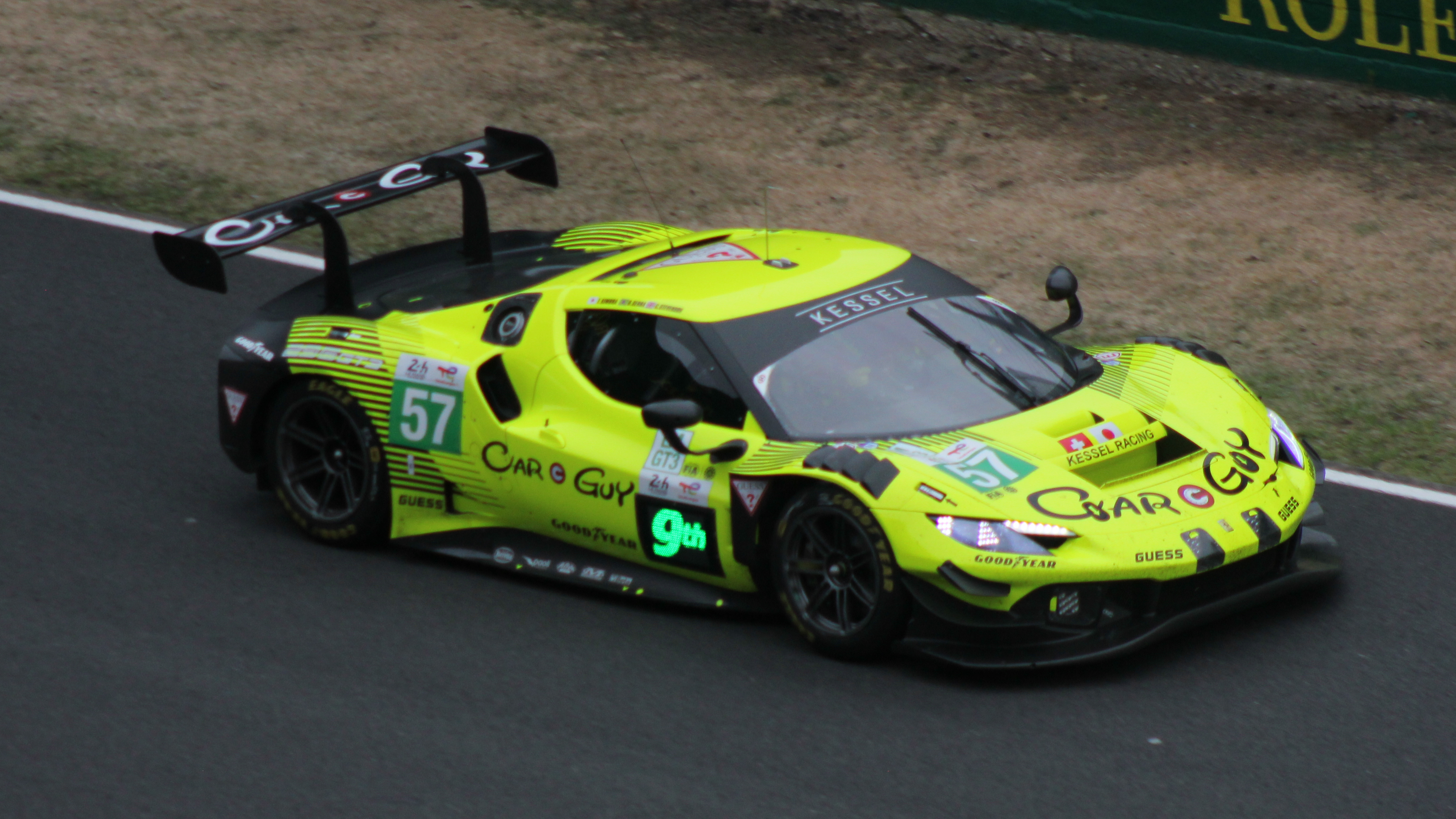
Takeshi Kimura, Daniel Serra and Casper Stevenson's Ferrari 296 GT3 for Car Guy Racing (ran by Kessel Racing) in the 2025 24 Hours of Le Mans at the Circuit de la Sarthe.

=== Asian Le Mans Series results ===
Year	Series	Entrant	Race	Car	Drivers	Group	Pos.
2018	Asian Le Mans	(Japan) Car Guy Racing	1. Shanghai	Ferrari 488	(Italy) Kei Cozzolino (Japan) Takeshi Kimura (United Kingdom) James Calado	GT	**1st**
2018	Asian Le Mans	(Japan) Car Guy Racing	2. Fuji	Ferrari 488	(Italy) Kei Cozzolino (Japan) Takeshi Kimura (United Kingdom) James Calado	GT	**1st**
2019	Asian Le Mans	(Japan) Car Guy Racing	3. Buriram	Ferrari 488	(Italy) Kei Cozzolino (Japan) Takeshi Kimura (United Kingdom) James Calado	GT	**1st**
2019	Asian Le Mans	(Japan) Car Guy Racing	4. Sepang	Ferrari 488	(Italy) Kei Cozzolino (Japan) Takeshi Kimura (United Kingdom) James Calado	GT	**1st**

=== Complete Super GT results ===
(key) (Races in bold indicate pole position) (Races in italics indicate fastest lap)

Year	Entrant	Car	Class	No.	Drivers	1	2	3	4	5	6	7	8	Pos.	Points
2018	Car Guy Racing	Honda NSX GT3	GT300	777	(Japan) Takeshi Kimura (Italy) Kei Cozzolino (Japan) Naoki Yokomizo	OKA; 15	FUJ; 26	SUZ; 21	CHA	FUJ; 17	SUG	AUT; Ret	MOT; 23	26th	11
2021	Pacific - Car Guy Racing	Ferrari 488 GT3 Evo	GT300	9	(Japan) Takeshi Kimura (Japan) Kei Cozzolino (Japan) Naoki Yokomizo	OKA; 23	FUJ; 25	MOT; 6	SUZ; 4	SUG; 15	AUT; 9	MOT; 19	FUJ; 13	16th	35
2022	Pacific hololive Car Guy Racing	Ferrari 488 GT3 Evo	GT300	9	(Japan) Takeshi Kimura (Japan) Kei Cozzolino (Japan) Naoki Yokomizo	OKA; 4	FUJ; 23	SUZ; 17	FUJ; 12	SUZ; 11	SUG; Ret	AUT; 13	MOT; 15	19th	26.5

=== 24 Hours of Le Mans results ===
Year	Entrant	No.	Car	Drivers	Class	Laps	Pos.	Class Pos.
2019	(Japan) Car Guy Racing	57	Ferrari 488 GTE	(Italy) Kei Cozzolino (Japan) Takeshi Kimura (France) Côme Ledogar	LMGTE Am	332	35th	5th
2020	(Japan) MR Racing	70	Ferrari 488 GTE Evo	(Monaco) Vincent Abril (Japan) Kei Cozzolino (Japan) Takeshi Kimura	LMGTE Am	172	DNF	DNF
2021	(Switzerland) Kessel Racing	57	Ferrari 488 GTE Evo	(Australia) Scott Andrews (Denmark) Mikkel Jensen (Japan) Takeshi Kimura	LMGTE Am	128	DNF	DNF
2022	(Switzerland) Kessel Racing	57	Ferrari 488 GTE Evo	(Denmark) Mikkel Jensen (Japan) Takeshi Kimura (Denmark) Frederik Schandorff	LMGTE Am	336	45th	12th
2023	(Switzerland) Kessel Racing	57	Ferrari 488 GTE Evo	(United States) Scott Huffaker (Japan) Takeshi Kimura (Brazil) Daniel Serra	LMGTE Am	254	DNF	DNF
2024	(France) Akkodis ASP Team	87	Lexus RC F GT3	(United Kingdom) Jack Hawksworth (Japan) Takeshi Kimura (France) Esteban Masson	LMGT3	279	37th	10th
2025	(Switzerland) Kessel Racing	57	Ferrari 296 GT3	(Japan) Takeshi Kimura (Brazil) Daniel Serra (United Kingdom) Casper Stevenson	LMGT3	339	40th	8th
2026	(Switzerland) Kessel Racing	57	Ferrari 296 GT3 Evo	(Japan) Takeshi Kimura (Denmark) Conrad Laursen (Brazil) Daniel Serra	LMGT3	334	42nd	10th
