= Takamitsu Matsui =

Japanese racing driver (born 1987)

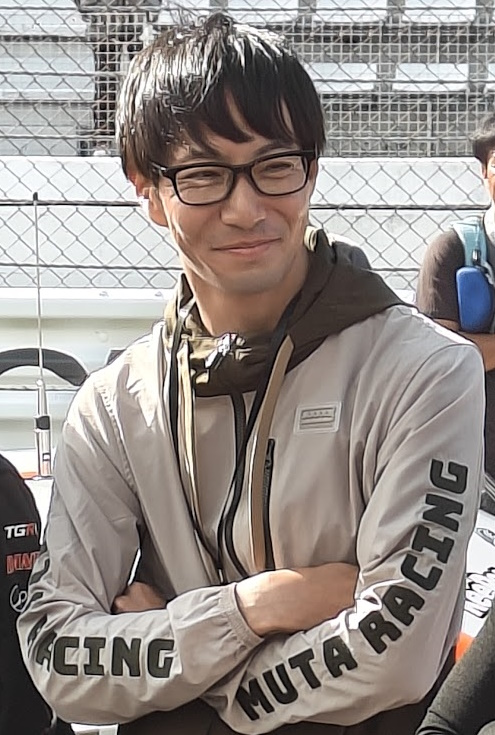
- Matsui in 2026
- Nationality: (Japan) Japanese
- Born: 15 December 1987 (age 38) Fukuyama, Hiroshima, Japan

Super GT - GT300 career
- Debut season: Super GT
- Current team: Hoppy Team Tsuchiya
- Categorisation: FIA Gold
- Car number: 25
- Former teams: Team Mach
- Starts: 69
- Wins: 4
- Podiums: 9
- Poles: 12
- Fastest laps: 4
- Best finish: 1st in 2016

Previous series
- 2014–16 2007–08 2007: Asian Le Mans Series; Formula Challenge Japan; Formula Toyota

Championship titles
- 2009, 2017, 2018, 2022 2016: Super Taikyū - ST-4 Super GT - GT300

Takamitsu Matsui (松井孝允, Matsui Takamitsu; born 15 December 1987) is a Japanese racing driver affiliated with Toyota Gazoo Racing who currently competes in Super GT for Hoppy Team Tsuchiya. A longtime competitor in the series, he is best known for winning the 2016 championship in the GT300 class, driving alongside Takeshi Tsuchiya. He is also a four-time class champion in the Super Taikyū endurance racing series, winning the title in 2009, 2017, 2018, and 2022, as well as a two-time class winner at the Nürburgring 24 Hours.

== Career ==
=== Early career ===
Matsui began his racing career in kart racing in 2001, and competed primarily in regional championships in Okayama until his move up to single-seaters in 2006. He made his debut in the Okayama FJ1600 series in 2006, taking four wins and the championship, and made cameos in the national FJ1600 series at Motegi and Formula Toyota at Fuji Speedway. After catching the attention of Naohiro Fujita, a retired racing driver and director of Okayama International Circuit, Matsui joined the Toyota Young Driver Program (TDP) the following year and moved to the Formula Challenge Japan series with Toyota support, but was released from the programme after the 2008 season.

In 2009, Matsui switched to endurance racing following his departure from Toyota, competing in the Super Taikyū Series in a Honda Civic Type R for Tatsuya Tanigawa's BOLD Motor Sports and winning the class title despite claiming only one victory. He returned to Formula Challenge Japan for 2010, this time with manufacturer support from Nissan, and finished runner-up to the dominant Yūichi Nakayama. Despite this, he left Nissan at the end of the year and would not drive full-time for the next two years, instead getting a job in the shipping industry. However, after being contacted by Takeshi Tsuchiya, who had previously worked with him during his time as a Toyota junior, Matsui returned to his full-time racing career in 2014, competing for Tsuchiya's teams in the Asian Le Mans Series and the newly introduced Japan Formula 4. With the exception of a one-round cameo in the All-Japan Formula Three Championship in 2016, where he won both races in the somewhat poorly contested National class, Matsui has competed exclusively in sports car racing since 2014.

=== Super GT ===
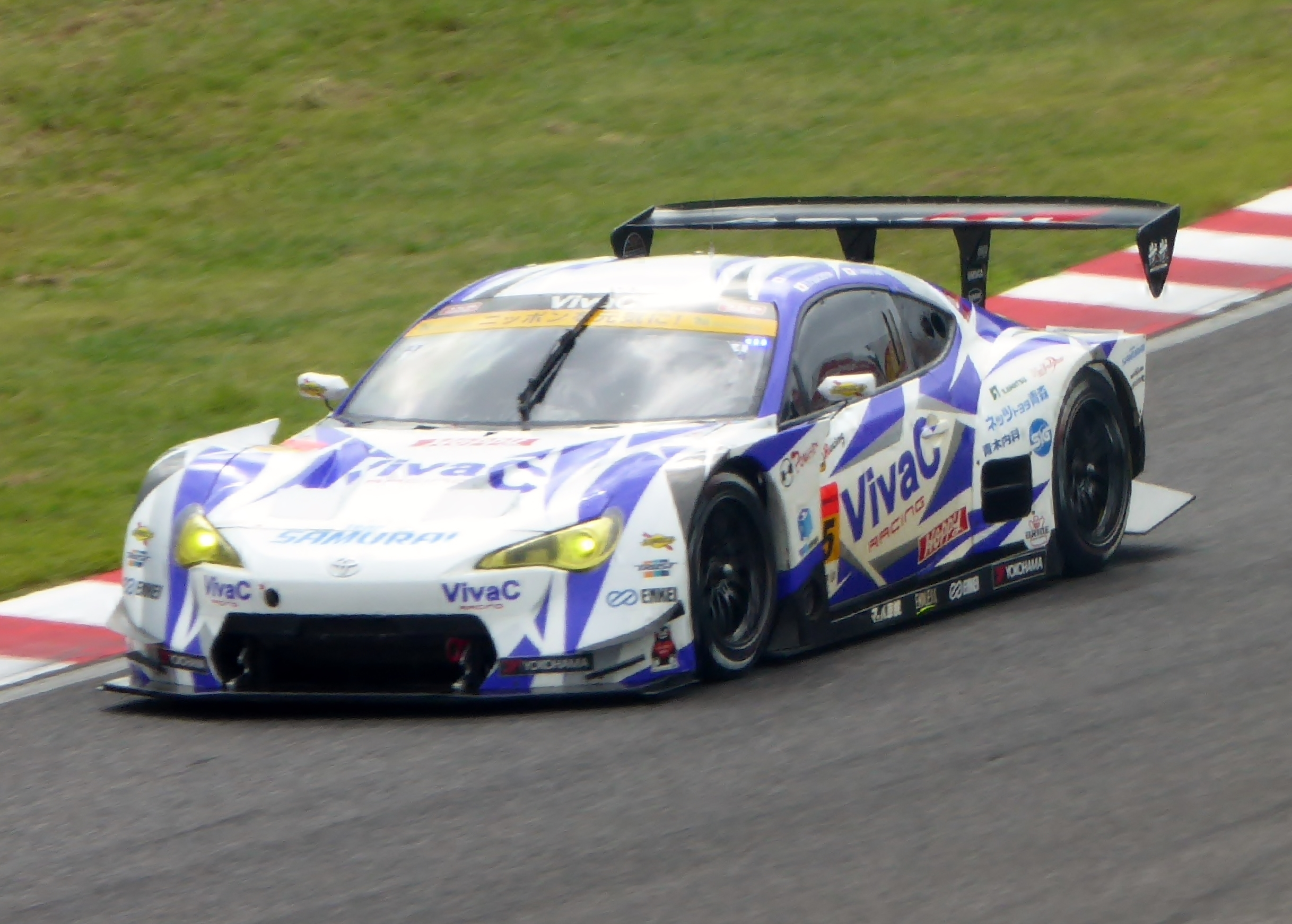
Matsui racing at Suzuka during his championship-winning 2016 season

Matsui made his debut in the top-flight Super GT series' GT300 category in 2015, driving a Dome-developed Toyota 86 MC alongside Takeshi Tsuchiya for Tsuchiya's VivaC Team Tsuchiya, which returned to the series for the first time since 2008. Matsui would rejoin Toyota in 2015 alongside his Super GT commitments after being recommended by Naoya Gamou, returning to Super Taikyū for the TOM'S-run Toyota Gazoo Racing team and making his international debut with TGR at the 2015 Nürburgring 24 Hours.

After claiming one race victory at Sugo during his 2015 campaign, Matsui remained with the team for 2016 to contest what would be his most successful season in the category, taking a dominant victory at Chang (now Buriram) and charging from the midfield at Motegi to emerge as series champion alongside his teammate Tsuchiya, who retired from full-time driving duties at the end of the year to focus on team management.

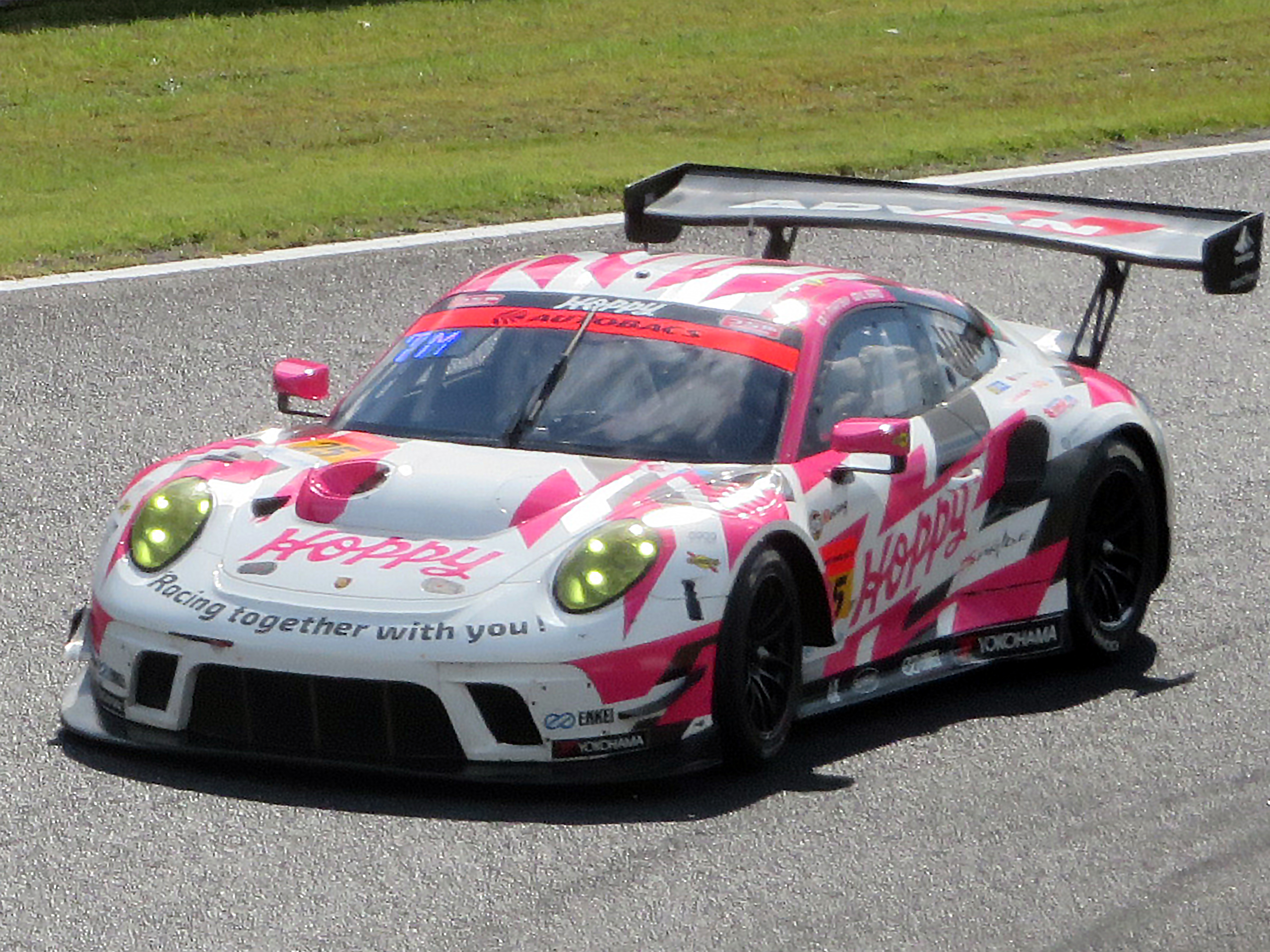
Matsui during the 2020 Super GT season

Despite his performances, Matsui did not move up to GT500, and instead remained with Tsuchiya's team in the GT300 class for 2017, partnered by Super Formula driver Kenta Yamashita. Alongside Yamashita and fellow Toyota-supported formula racers Sho Tsuboi and Kimiya Sato, Matsui would spend 2017, 2018, and 2019 in inconsistent form, demonstrating exceptional qualifying pace and taking pole positions but more frequently finishing towards the end of the field. Results would dip further after the team's switch to the Porsche 911 GT3 R for the 2020 season, and remained unremarkable until Matsui's departure at the end of the 2022 season.

Matsui joined Team Mach alongside professional sim racer Yusuke Tomibayashi for the 2023 season, driving the familiar Toyota 86 MC. However, the team would ultimately fail to score a single point over the course of the year.

== Racing record ==
=== Career summary ===
Season	Series	Team	Races	Wins	Poles	F/Laps	Podiums	Points	Position
2006	Formula Toyota	Wako's Scholarship	1	0	0	0	0	1	NC
2007	Formula Challenge Japan	FTRS Scholarship	18	0	0	0	2	50	12th
2007	Formula Toyota	TOM'S Spirit	7	0	0	1	0	21	9th
2008	Formula Challenge Japan	TDP Scholarship	16	3	3	4	5	129	4th
2009	Super Taikyū - ST-4	BOLD Motor Sports	7	1	3	5	6	100‡	**1st‡**
2010	Formula Challenge Japan	NDDP FCJ	12	1	0	0	8	56	**2nd**
2012	Super Taikyū - ST-1	Team Samurai	1	1	1	1	1	50‡	**3rd‡**
2013	Porsche Carrera Cup Japan	Racing X-Road Service	3	1	1	2	2	47	8th
2014	Asian Le Mans Series - GT	AAI-RStrada	4	0	0	0	1	48	6th
2014	Japan Formula 4 - East	Samurai Supporters	6	1	1	1	5	81	**2nd**
2014	Japan Formula 4 - West	Samurai Supporters	3	0	0	1	2	33	6th
2015	Super GT - GT300	VivaC Team Tsuchiya	6	1	1	0	1	35	10th
2015	Super Taikyū - ST-4	Gazoo Racing TOM'S Spirit	6	0	0	2	3	55.5‡	6th‡
2015	24 Hours of Nürburgring - SP3T	Team Toyota Gazoo Racing	1	0	0	0	0	N/A	4th
2015-16	Asian Le Mans Series - LMP3	Team AAI	1	0	0	0	0	0	6th
2016	Super GT - GT300	VivaC Team Tsuchiya	8	2	3	0	4	78	**1st**
2016	Japanese Formula 3 Championship - National	Team Samurai	2	2	2	2	2	24	6th
2016	Super Taikyū - ST-4	TOM'S Spirit	6	1	4	1	3	96‡	**2nd‡**
2016	24 Hours of Nürburgring - SP3T	Toyota Gazoo Racing	1	0	0	0	0	N/A	NC
2017	Super GT - GT300	VivaC Team Tsuchiya	8	1	3	1	2	48	5th
2017	Super Taikyū - ST-4	TOM'S Spirit	6	5	4	3	6	135‡	**1st‡**
2017	24 Hours of Nürburgring - SP3T	Toyota Gazoo Racing	1	0	0	1	1	N/A	**2nd**
2018	Super GT - GT300	Tsuchiya Engineering	8	0	2	1	2	39	7th
2018	Super Taikyū - ST-4	TOM'S Spirit	6	4	5	2	5	159‡	**1st‡**
2018	24 Hours of Nürburgring - SP-Pro	Toyota Gazoo Racing	1	1	1	1	1	N/A	**1st**
2019	Super GT - GT300	Tsuchiya Engineering	8	0	3	2	0	17	19th
2019	Super Taikyū - ST-4	TOM'S Spirit	6	2	5	2	4	123.5‡	**2nd‡**
2019	24 Hours of Nürburgring - SP-Pro	Toyota Gazoo Racing	1	1	1	1	1	N/A	**1st**
2020	Super GT - GT300	Hoppy Team Tsuchiya	8	0	0	0	0	10	20th
2020	Super Taikyū - ST-4	Endless Sports	4	0	0	0	0	74‡	4th‡
2021	Super GT - GT300	Hoppy Team Tsuchiya	8	0	0	0	0	21	14th
2021	Super Taikyū - ST-2	ROOKIE Racing	2	0	2	2	0	23‡	8th‡
2021	Super Taikyū - ST-Q	ROOKIE Racing	3	0	0	0	3	N/A	NC
2022	Super GT - GT300	Hoppy Team Tsuchiya	8	0	0	0	0	1	34th
2022	Super Taikyū - ST-4	TOM'S Spirit	6	5	5	3	6	177.5‡	**1st‡**
2022	Nürburgring Endurance Series - SP-Pro	Toyota Gazoo Racing	1						
2022	Nürburgring Endurance Series - SP4	Toyota Gazoo Racing	1						
2023	Super GT - GT300	Team Mach	8	0	0	0	0	0	NC
2023	Super Taikyū - ST-4	TOM'S Spirit	6	1	0	5	5	100.5‡	**3rd‡**
2023	Nürburgring Endurance Series - SP8	Team HAL	1	1	1	1	1	N/A	N/A
2023	TGR GR86/BRZ Cup	Netz Toyama Racing	5	1	0	0	1	20	12th
2024	Super GT - GT300	Hoppy Team Tsuchiya	8	0	0	0	0	0	NC
2024	Super Taikyu - ST-Q	GR Team Spirit							
2024	TGR GR86/BRZ Cup	Netz Toyama Racing	6	1	0	0	1	51	6th
2025	Super Taikyu - ST-Q	GR Team Spirit							
2025	Super GT - GT300	Hoppy Team Tsuchiya	6	0	0	0	0	2	31st
2025	Nürburgring Langstrecken-Serie - SP8T	TOYOTA GAZOO ROOKIE Racing							
2025	TGR GR86/BRZ Cup	Netz Toyama Racing	7	0	0	0	0	6	18th
2026	Super Taikyu - ST-Q	GR Team ORC Field							
2026	Super GT - GT300	Hoppy Team Tsuchiya	8	0	0	0	0	3	41st
2026	TGR GR86/BRZ Cup	Netz Toyama Racing							

* Season still in progress.

=== Complete Super GT results ===
(key) (Races in bold indicate pole position) (Races in italics indicate fastest lap)

Year	Team	Car	Class	1	2	3	4	5	6	7	8	9	Pos.	Points
2015	VivaC Team Tsuchiya	Toyota 86 MC	GT300	OKA; 6	FUJ; Ret	**CHA**; 7	FUJ; 5	SUZ; 23	SUG; 1	AUT	MOT		10th	35
2016	VivaC Team Tsuchiya	Toyota 86 MC	GT300	**OKA**; 6	FUJ; 3	**SUG**; 2	FUJ; 13	SUZ; 22	**CHA**; 1	MOT; 7	MOT; 1		1st	78
2017	VivaC Team Tsuchiya	Toyota 86 MC	GT300	OKA; 4	FUJ; 15	**AUT**; 1	**SUG**; 3	FUJ; 29	**SUZ**; 18	CHA; 15	MOT; 5		5th	48
2018	Tsuchiya Engineering	Toyota 86 MC	GT300	OKA; 3	FUJ; Ret	SUZ; 2	CHA; 19	**FUJ**; 5	SUG; 24	**AUT**; 24	MOT; 8		7th	39
2019	Tsuchiya Engineering	Toyota 86 MC	GT300	OKA; Ret	FUJ; 18	**SUZ**; 5	**CHA**; 4	FUJ; 26	**AUT**; 16	SUG; 27	MOT; 18		19th	17
2020	Hoppy Team Tsuchiya	Porsche 911 GT3 R	GT300	FUJ; 19	FUJ; 20	SUZ; 14	MOT; 8	FUJ; 11	SUZ; 9	MOT; 6	FUJ; 14		20th	10
2021	Hoppy Team Tsuchiya	Porsche 911 GT3 R	GT300	OKA; 7	FUJ; 13	MOT; 6	SUZ; 23	SUG; 19	AUT; 10	MOT; 5	FUJ; 6		14th	21
2022	Hoppy Team Tsuchiya	Toyota GR Supra GT300	GT300	OKA; 22	FUJ1; 11	SUZ1; Ret	FUJ2; WD	SUZ2; 15	SUG; 10	AUT; 16	MOT; Ret		34th	1
2023	Team Mach	Toyota 86 MC GT300	GT300	OKA; 15	FUJ1; 22	SUZ1; 19	FUJ2; 18	SUZ2; 21	SUG; 22	AUT; 18	MOT; 18		NC	0
2024	Hoppy Team Tsuchiya	Toyota GR Supra GT300	GT300	OKA; 14	FUJ; 23	SUZ; 18	FUJ; Ret	SUG; Ret	AUT; 11	MOT; Ret	SUZ; 15		NC	0
2025	Hoppy Team Tsuchiya	Toyota GR Supra GT300	GT300	OKA; 15	FUJ; 22	SEP	FS1 (25)	FS2; 23	SUZ; 20	SUG; 20	AUT; 15	MOT; DNS	31st	2
2026	Hoppy Team Tsuchiya	Toyota GR Supra GT300	GT300	OKA; 27	FUJ; 17	FUJ; 20	SUZ; 16	SUG; 14	AUT; 15	MOT; 18	MOT; 22		41st	3

Sporting positions
Preceded by André Couto	Super GT; GT300 Champion; 2016; With: Takeshi Tsuchiya	Succeeded by Nobuteru Taniguchi; Tatsuya Kataoka
