= 2022 Super GT Series =

Sports car racing season in Japan

The 2022 Autobacs Super GT Series was a motor racing championship based in Japan for grand touring cars, sanctioned by the Japan Automobile Federation (JAF) and run by the GT Association (GTA). It was the thirtieth season of the JAF Super GT Championship which includes the All Japan Grand Touring Car Championship era, and the eighteenth season under the Super GT name. It was also the fortieth overall season of a national JAF sportscar championship dating back to the All Japan Endurance/Sports Prototype Championship.

Team Impul won the GT500 championship for the first time since 1995, as Kazuki Hiramine and Bertrand Baguette won the Drivers' Championship. It was the first Teams' Championship for Impul since the inaugural 1994 season, and the first championship for the new Nissan Z GT500 which made its debut this season. In GT300, Kondo Racing, Kiyoto Fujinami, and João Paulo de Oliveira won their second set of Drivers' and Teams' Championships in three years.

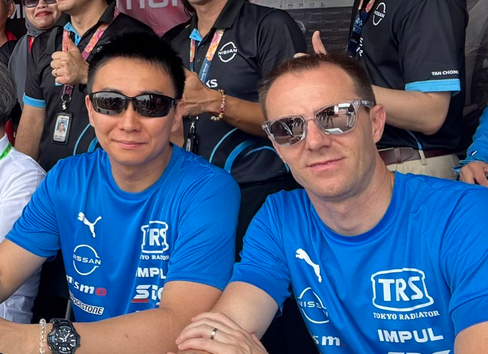
Kazuki Hiramine, and Bertrand Baguette were the GT500 driver's champion, driving for Team Impul, who were the GT500 teams' champions

== Calendar ==
A confirmed eight round provisional 2022 calendar was announced on 6 August 2021. The calendar was updated on 20 October 2021, with the sixth round at Sportsland Sugo moving from the weekend of 10–11 September to 17–18 September, avoiding a clash of dates with the 2022 FIA WEC 6 Hours of Fuji. Distances for all events were confirmed on 5 March 2022: Rounds two and four at Fuji Speedway, and round five at Suzuka Circuit, were 450 kilometre races, while all other rounds were 300 kilometres.

Round	Race	Circuit	Dates
1	Okayama GT 300 km Race	Okayama International Circuit	16–17 April
2	FAV Hotel Fuji GT 450 km Race	Fuji Speedway	3–4 May
3	Takanokono Hotel Suzuka GT 300 km Race	Suzuka Circuit	28–29 May
4	Fujimaki Group Fuji GT 100 Lap Race	Fuji Speedway	6–7 August
5	Fujimaki Group Suzuka GT 450 km Race	Suzuka Circuit	27–28 August
6	Sugo GT 300 km Race	Sportsland Sugo	17–18 September
7	FAV Hotel Autopolis GT 300 km Race	Autopolis	1–2 October
8	Motegi GT 300 km Race	Mobility Resort Motegi	5–6 November

== Teams and drivers ==
All teams competed under a Japanese license.

=== GT500 ===
Team	Make	Car	Engine	No.	Drivers	Tyre	Rounds
NDDP Racing	Nissan	Nissan Z GT500	Nissan NR4S21 2.0 L Turbo I4	3	(Japan) Katsumasa Chiyo	MI	All
NDDP Racing	Nissan	Nissan Z GT500	Nissan NR4S21 2.0 L Turbo I4	3	(Japan) Mitsunori Takaboshi	MI	All
NISMO	Nissan	Nissan Z GT500	Nissan NR4S21 2.0 L Turbo I4	23	(Japan) Tsugio Matsuda	MI	All
NISMO	Nissan	Nissan Z GT500	Nissan NR4S21 2.0 L Turbo I4	23	(Italy) Ronnie Quintarelli	MI	All
ARTA	Honda	Honda NSX-GT	Honda HR-420E 2.0 L Turbo I4	8	(Japan) Tomoki Nojiri	B	All
ARTA	Honda	Honda NSX-GT	Honda HR-420E 2.0 L Turbo I4	8	(Japan) Nirei Fukuzumi	B	All
Team Impul	Nissan	Nissan Z GT500	Nissan NR4S21 2.0 L Turbo I4	12	(Japan) Kazuki Hiramine	B	All
Team Impul	Nissan	Nissan Z GT500	Nissan NR4S21 2.0 L Turbo I4	12	(Belgium) Bertrand Baguette	B	All
TGR Team Eneos ROOKIE	Toyota GR	Toyota GR Supra GT500	Toyota RI4AG 2.0 L Turbo I4	14	(Japan) Kazuya Oshima	B	All
TGR Team Eneos ROOKIE	Toyota GR	Toyota GR Supra GT500	Toyota RI4AG 2.0 L Turbo I4	14	(Japan) Kenta Yamashita	B	All
Team Red Bull Mugen	Honda	Honda NSX-GT	Honda HR-420E 2.0 L Turbo I4	16	(Japan) Ukyo Sasahara	D	All
Team Red Bull Mugen	Honda	Honda NSX-GT	Honda HR-420E 2.0 L Turbo I4	16	(Japan) Toshiki Oyu	D	All
Astemo REAL Racing	Honda	Honda NSX-GT	Honda HR-420E 2.0 L Turbo I4	17	(Japan) Koudai Tsukakoshi	B	All
Astemo REAL Racing	Honda	Honda NSX-GT	Honda HR-420E 2.0 L Turbo I4	17	(Japan) Nobuharu Matsushita	B	All
TGR Team WedsSport Bandoh	Toyota GR	Toyota GR Supra GT500	Toyota RI4AG 2.0 L Turbo I4	19	(Japan) Yuji Kunimoto	Y	All
TGR Team WedsSport Bandoh	Toyota GR	Toyota GR Supra GT500	Toyota RI4AG 2.0 L Turbo I4	19	(Japan) Sena Sakaguchi	Y	All
Kondo Racing	Nissan	Nissan Z GT500	Nissan NR4S21 2.0 L Turbo I4	24	(Japan) Daiki Sasaki	Y	All
Kondo Racing	Nissan	Nissan Z GT500	Nissan NR4S21 2.0 L Turbo I4	24	(Japan) Kohei Hirate	Y	All
TGR Team au TOM'S	Toyota GR	Toyota GR Supra GT500	Toyota RI4AG 2.0 L Turbo I4	36	(Japan) Sho Tsuboi	B	All
TGR Team au TOM'S	Toyota GR	Toyota GR Supra GT500	Toyota RI4AG 2.0 L Turbo I4	36	(France) Giuliano Alesi	B	All
TGR Team KeePer TOM'S	Toyota GR	Toyota GR Supra GT500	Toyota RI4AG 2.0 L Turbo I4	37	(France) Sacha Fenestraz	B	All
TGR Team KeePer TOM'S	Toyota GR	Toyota GR Supra GT500	Toyota RI4AG 2.0 L Turbo I4	37	(Japan) Ritomo Miyata	B	All
TGR Team ZENT Cerumo	Toyota GR	Toyota GR Supra GT500	Toyota RI4AG 2.0 L Turbo I4	38	(Japan) Yuji Tachikawa	B	All
TGR Team ZENT Cerumo	Toyota GR	Toyota GR Supra GT500	Toyota RI4AG 2.0 L Turbo I4	38	(Japan) Hiroaki Ishiura	B	All
TGR Team SARD	Toyota GR	Toyota GR Supra GT500	Toyota RI4AG 2.0 L Turbo I4	39	(Japan) Yuhi Sekiguchi	B	All
TGR Team SARD	Toyota GR	Toyota GR Supra GT500	Toyota RI4AG 2.0 L Turbo I4	39	(Japan) Yuichi Nakayama	B	All
Modulo Nakajima Racing	Honda	Honda NSX-GT	Honda HR-420E 2.0 L Turbo I4	64	(Japan) Takuya Izawa	D	All
Modulo Nakajima Racing	Honda	Honda NSX-GT	Honda HR-420E 2.0 L Turbo I4	64	(Japan) Hiroki Otsu	D	All
Team Kunimitsu	Honda	Honda NSX-GT	Honda HR-420E 2.0 L Turbo I4	100	(Japan) Naoki Yamamoto	B	All
Team Kunimitsu	Honda	Honda NSX-GT	Honda HR-420E 2.0 L Turbo I4	100	(Japan) Tadasuke Makino	B	All

=== GT300 ===
Team	Make	Car	Engine	No.	Drivers	Tyre	Rounds
muta Racing INGING	Toyota GR	Toyota GR86 GT300	Toyota 2UR-GSE 5.4 L V8	2	(Japan) Hiroki Katoh	B	All
muta Racing INGING	Toyota GR	Toyota GR86 GT300	Toyota 2UR-GSE 5.4 L V8	2	(Japan) Yuui Tsutsumi	B	All
Goodsmile Racing & Team UKYO	Mercedes-AMG	Mercedes-AMG GT3 Evo	Mercedes-AMG M159 6.2 L V8	4	(Japan) Nobuteru Taniguchi	Y	All
Goodsmile Racing & Team UKYO	Mercedes-AMG	Mercedes-AMG GT3 Evo	Mercedes-AMG M159 6.2 L V8	4	(Japan) Tatsuya Kataoka	Y	All
Team Mach	Toyota	Toyota 86 MC GT300	GTA V8 4.5 L V8	5	(Japan) Yusuke Tomibayashi	Y	All
Team Mach	Toyota	Toyota 86 MC GT300	GTA V8 4.5 L V8	5	(Japan) Reiji Hiraki	Y	All
Motoyama Racing with Team LeMans	Audi	Audi R8 LMS Evo II	Audi DAR 5.2 L V10	6	(Japan) Satoshi Motoyama	Y	1
Motoyama Racing with Team LeMans	Audi	Audi R8 LMS Evo II	Audi DAR 5.2 L V10	6	(Japan) Yoshiaki Katayama	Y	1
Team LeMans (Note: For the first round the team entered as Motoyama Racing with Team LeMans, and the team rebranded as Team LeMans for the rest of season.)	Audi	Audi R8 LMS Evo II	Audi DAR 5.2 L V10	6	(Japan) Yoshiaki Katayama	Y	2–8
Team LeMans	Audi	Audi R8 LMS Evo II	Audi DAR 5.2 L V10	6	(Spain) Roberto Merhi Muntan	Y	2–8
Team LeMans	Audi	Audi R8 LMS Evo II	Audi DAR 5.2 L V10	6	(Japan) Shintaro Kawabata	Y	2
BMW Team Studie × CSL	BMW	BMW M4 GT3	BMW P58 3.0 L Twin Turbo I6	7	(Japan) Seiji Ara	MI	All
BMW Team Studie × CSL	BMW	BMW M4 GT3	BMW P58 3.0 L Twin Turbo I6	7	(Brazil) Augusto Farfus	MI	1–2, 4–6, 8
BMW Team Studie × CSL	BMW	BMW M4 GT3	BMW P58 3.0 L Twin Turbo I6	7	(Japan) Tsubasa Kondo	MI	2–3, 5, 7
Pacific CarGuy Racing	Ferrari	Ferrari 488 GT3 Evo 2020	Ferrari F154CB 3.9 L Twin Turbo V8	9	(Japan) Kei Cozzolino	Y	All
Pacific CarGuy Racing	Ferrari	Ferrari 488 GT3 Evo 2020	Ferrari F154CB 3.9 L Twin Turbo V8	9	(Japan) Naoki Yokomizo	Y	1, 5
Pacific CarGuy Racing	Ferrari	Ferrari 488 GT3 Evo 2020	Ferrari F154CB 3.9 L Twin Turbo V8	9	(Japan) Takeshi Kimura	Y	2–4, 6–8
Pacific CarGuy Racing	Ferrari	Ferrari 488 GT3 Evo 2020	Ferrari F154CB 3.9 L Twin Turbo V8	9	(Japan) Shintaro Kawabata	Y	4
GAINER	Nissan	Nissan GT-R Nismo GT3	Nissan VR38DETT 3.8 L Twin Turbo V6	10	(Japan) Riki Okusa	D	All
GAINER	Nissan	Nissan GT-R Nismo GT3	Nissan VR38DETT 3.8 L Twin Turbo V6	10	(Japan) Ryuichiro Tomita	D	1–6, 8
GAINER	Nissan	Nissan GT-R Nismo GT3	Nissan VR38DETT 3.8 L Twin Turbo V6	10	(Japan) Yusuke Shiotsu	D	2, 4–5, 7
GAINER	Nissan	Nissan GT-R Nismo GT3	Nissan VR38DETT 3.8 L Twin Turbo V6	11	(Japan) Hironobu Yasuda	D	All
GAINER	Nissan	Nissan GT-R Nismo GT3	Nissan VR38DETT 3.8 L Twin Turbo V6	11	(Japan) Keishi Ishikawa	D	All
Team UpGarage (Note: Car No. 18 entered as Team UpGarage, and car No. 55 entered as ARTA)	Honda	Honda NSX GT3 Evo22	Honda JNC1 3.5 L Twin Turbo V6	18	(Japan) Takashi Kobayashi	Y	All
Team UpGarage	Honda	Honda NSX GT3 Evo22	Honda JNC1 3.5 L Twin Turbo V6	18	(Japan) Kakunoshin Ohta	Y	All
ARTA	Honda	Honda NSX GT3 Evo22	Honda JNC1 3.5 L Twin Turbo V6	55	(Japan) Hideki Mutoh	B	All
ARTA	Honda	Honda NSX GT3 Evo22	Honda JNC1 3.5 L Twin Turbo V6	55	(Japan) Iori Kimura	B	All
SHADE Racing	Toyota GR	Toyota GR86 GT300	Toyota 2UR-GSE 5.4 L V8	20	(Japan) Katsuyuki Hiranaka	D	All
SHADE Racing	Toyota GR	Toyota GR86 GT300	Toyota 2UR-GSE 5.4 L V8	20	(Japan) Eijiro Shimizu	D	All
SHADE Racing	Toyota GR	Toyota GR86 GT300	Toyota 2UR-GSE 5.4 L V8	20	(Japan) Shinnosuke Yamada	D	5
R'Qs Motor Sports (Note: Car No. 22 entered as R'Qs Motor Sports, and car No. 50 entered as Arnage Racing) Arnage Racing	Mercedes-AMG	Mercedes-AMG GT3 Evo	Mercedes-AMG M159 6.2 L V8	22	(Japan) Hisashi Wada	Y	1–2, 4–8
R'Qs Motor Sports Arnage Racing	Mercedes-AMG	Mercedes-AMG GT3 Evo	Mercedes-AMG M159 6.2 L V8	22	(Japan) Masaki Jyonai	Y	1–2, 4–8
R'Qs Motor Sports Arnage Racing	Toyota	Toyota 86 MC GT300	GTA V8 4.5 L V8	50	(Japan) Ryohei Sakaguchi	Y	All
R'Qs Motor Sports Arnage Racing	Toyota	Toyota 86 MC GT300	GTA V8 4.5 L V8	50	(Japan) Masaki Kano	Y	1–2, 4–7
R'Qs Motor Sports Arnage Racing	Toyota	Toyota 86 MC GT300	GTA V8 4.5 L V8	50	(Japan) Takeshi Suehiro	Y	2, 4–5
R'Qs Motor Sports Arnage Racing	Toyota	Toyota 86 MC GT300	GTA V8 4.5 L V8	50	(Japan) Ryosei Yamashita	Y	3, 8
Hoppy Team Tsuchiya	Toyota GR	Toyota GR Supra GT300	Toyota 2UR-GSE 5.4 L V8	25	(Japan) Takamitsu Matsui	Y	1–3, 5–8
Hoppy Team Tsuchiya	Toyota GR	Toyota GR Supra GT300	Toyota 2UR-GSE 5.4 L V8	25	(Japan) Seita Nonaka	Y	1–3, 5–8
Max Racing	Toyota GR	Toyota GR Supra GT300	Toyota 2UR-GSE 5.4 L V8	244	(Japan) Kimiya Sato	Y	2–8
Max Racing	Toyota GR	Toyota GR Supra GT300	Toyota 2UR-GSE 5.4 L V8	244	(Japan) Atsushi Miyake	Y	2–8
apr	Toyota GR	Toyota GR86 GT300	Toyota 2UR-GSE 5.4 L V8	30	(Japan) Manabu Orido	Y	All
apr	Toyota GR	Toyota GR86 GT300	Toyota 2UR-GSE 5.4 L V8	30	(Japan) Hiroaki Nagai	Y	1–4, 6–8
apr	Toyota GR	Toyota GR86 GT300	Toyota 2UR-GSE 5.4 L V8	30	(Japan) Hibiki Taira	Y	2, 4–5
apr	Toyota GR	Toyota GR86 GT300	Toyota 2UR-GSE 5.4 L V8	30	(Japan) Yuta Kamimura	Y	5
apr	Toyota GR	Toyota GR Sport Prius PHV apr GT	Toyota 2UR-GSE 5.4 L Hybrid V8	31	(Japan) Koki Saga	B	All
apr	Toyota GR	Toyota GR Sport Prius PHV apr GT	Toyota 2UR-GSE 5.4 L Hybrid V8	31	(Japan) Yuhki Nakayama	B	All
apr	Toyota GR	Toyota GR Sport Prius PHV apr GT	Toyota 2UR-GSE 5.4 L Hybrid V8	31	(Japan) Kazuto Kotaka	B	4–5
Busou Drago Corse	Nissan	Nissan GT-R Nismo GT3	Nissan VR38DETT 3.8 L Twin Turbo V6	34	(Japan) Masataka Yanagida	D	1–3
Busou Drago Corse	Nissan	Nissan GT-R Nismo GT3	Nissan VR38DETT 3.8 L Twin Turbo V6	34	(Japan) Yuji Ide	D	1–3
NILZZ Racing	Nissan	Nissan GT-R Nismo GT3	Nissan VR38DETT 3.8 L Twin Turbo V6	48	(Japan) Taiyo Ida	Y	All
NILZZ Racing	Nissan	Nissan GT-R Nismo GT3	Nissan VR38DETT 3.8 L Twin Turbo V6	48	(Japan) Yuki Tanaka	Y	1–2, 4–8
NILZZ Racing	Nissan	Nissan GT-R Nismo GT3	Nissan VR38DETT 3.8 L Twin Turbo V6	48	(Japan) Yuya Hiraki	Y	3
NILZZ Racing	Nissan	Nissan GT-R Nismo GT3	Nissan VR38DETT 3.8 L Twin Turbo V6	48	(Japan) Masaya Kohno	Y	4–5
Saitama Toyopet GreenBrave	Toyota GR	Toyota GR Supra GT300	Toyota 2UR-GSE 5.4 L V8	52	(Japan) Kohta Kawaai	B	All
Saitama Toyopet GreenBrave	Toyota GR	Toyota GR Supra GT300	Toyota 2UR-GSE 5.4 L V8	52	(Japan) Hiroki Yoshida	B	1, 3–8
Saitama Toyopet GreenBrave	Toyota GR	Toyota GR Supra GT300	Toyota 2UR-GSE 5.4 L V8	52	(Japan) Togo Suganami	B	2
Kondo Racing	Nissan	Nissan GT-R Nismo GT3	Nissan VR38DETT 3.8 L Twin Turbo V6	56	(Japan) Kiyoto Fujinami	Y	All
Kondo Racing	Nissan	Nissan GT-R Nismo GT3	Nissan VR38DETT 3.8 L Twin Turbo V6	56	(Brazil) João Paulo de Oliveira	Y	All
LM Corsa	Toyota GR	Toyota GR Supra GT300	Toyota 2UR-GSE 5.4 L V8	60	(Japan) Hiroki Yoshimoto	D	All
LM Corsa	Toyota GR	Toyota GR Supra GT300	Toyota 2UR-GSE 5.4 L V8	60	(Japan) Shunsuke Kohno	D	All
R&D Sport	Subaru	Subaru BRZ GT300 (ZD8)	Subaru EJ20 2.0 L Turbo F4	61	(Japan) Takuto Iguchi	D	All
R&D Sport	Subaru	Subaru BRZ GT300 (ZD8)	Subaru EJ20 2.0 L Turbo F4	61	(Japan) Hideki Yamauchi	D	All
K2 R&D LEON Racing	Mercedes-AMG	Mercedes-AMG GT3 Evo	Mercedes-AMG M159 6.2 L V8	65	(Japan) Naoya Gamou	B	All
K2 R&D LEON Racing	Mercedes-AMG	Mercedes-AMG GT3 Evo	Mercedes-AMG M159 6.2 L V8	65	(Japan) Takuro Shinohara	B	All
JLOC	Lamborghini	Lamborghini Huracán GT3 Evo	Lamborghini DGF 5.2 L V10	87	(Japan) Kosuke Matsuura	Y	All
JLOC	Lamborghini	Lamborghini Huracán GT3 Evo	Lamborghini DGF 5.2 L V10	87	(Japan) Natsu Sakaguchi	Y	All
JLOC	Lamborghini	Lamborghini Huracán GT3 Evo	Lamborghini DGF 5.2 L V10	88	(Japan) Takashi Kogure	Y	All
JLOC	Lamborghini	Lamborghini Huracán GT3 Evo	Lamborghini DGF 5.2 L V10	88	(Japan) Yuya Motojima	Y	All
K-tunes Racing	Lexus	Lexus RC F GT3	Lexus 2UR-GSE 5.4 L V8	96	(Japan) Morio Nitta	D	All
K-tunes Racing	Lexus	Lexus RC F GT3	Lexus 2UR-GSE 5.4 L V8	96	(Japan) Shinichi Takagi	D	All
Tomei Sports	Nissan	Nissan GT-R Nismo GT3	Nissan VR38DETT 3.8 L Twin Turbo V6	360	(Japan) Takayuki Aoki	Y	All
Tomei Sports	Nissan	Nissan GT-R Nismo GT3	Nissan VR38DETT 3.8 L Twin Turbo V6	360	(Japan) Atsushi Tanaka	Y	1–2, 4–5, 7
Tomei Sports	Nissan	Nissan GT-R Nismo GT3	Nissan VR38DETT 3.8 L Twin Turbo V6	360	(Japan) Yusaku Shibata	Y	2–6
Tomei Sports	Nissan	Nissan GT-R Nismo GT3	Nissan VR38DETT 3.8 L Twin Turbo V6	360	(Japan) Teppei Natori	Y	8

=== Vehicle changes ===
==== GT500 Class ====
- After 14 seasons, Nissan replaced the Nissan GT-R Nismo GT500 with the new Nissan Z GT500 (RZ34). Nissan last used the Fairlady Z as their flagship GT500 vehicle from 2004 to 2007.
- Honda updated their NSX-GT race car, which is now styled after the limited edition Honda NSX Type S model.

==== GT300 Class ====
- Tsuchiya Engineering constructed their own version of the Toyota GR Supra to GT300 regulations, replacing their previous Porsche 911 GT3-R.
- apr launched the Toyota GR86 GT, constructed to GT300 specifications and based on the second-generation Toyota 86 (ZN8) model. apr's number 30 team and series newcomers SHADE Racing each field the car in 2022. Subsequently, muta Racing INGING announced that they also field the new Toyota GR86 GT, replacing their previous Lotus Evora MC.
- The new BMW M4 GT3 (G82) makes its Japanese racing debut via BMW Team Studie x CSL.
- Arnage Racing changed vehicles from the Mercedes-AMG GT3, to the Dome-constructed Toyota MC86.
- Drago Corse with their new collaboration with Busou (see Entrant Changes below), changed vehicles to the Nissan GT-R Nismo GT3.
- ARTA and Team UPGarage entered the upgraded Honda NSX GT3 Evo22.
- Team LeMans (Motoyama Racing with Team LeMans in Round 1) have the upgraded Audi R8 LMS GT3 Evo II.

=== Entrant changes ===
==== GT500 Class ====
- Toyota: Toyota Gazoo Racing announced their GT500 class driver line-ups on 6 December 2021.
  - Reigning GT500 champion Yuhi Sekiguchi transferred to TGR Team SARD, replacing 2016 champion Heikki Kovalainen, who announced on 30 November 2021 that he would not return to the series in 2022.
  - Giuliano Alesi stepped up to GT500 and replaced Sekiguchi at TGR Team au TOM's. 2017 GT500 champion Ryo Hirakawa left the series after eight years to compete in the FIA World Endurance Championship Hypercar with Toyota Gazoo Racing. To replace Hirakawa, Ritomo Miyata transferred to TGR Team KeePer TOM's after two seasons at TGR Team WedsSport Bandoh.
  - Sena Sakaguchi, who split time between GT500 and GT300 classes in 2021, replaced Miyata at Team WedsSport Bandoh.
- Honda: Honda announced their Super GT driver line-ups on 14 January.
  - Nobuharu Matsushita, who made his GT500 debut with Nissan in 2021, rejoined Honda as a factory driver and signed with Astemo Real Racing. Matsushita replaced Bertrand Baguette, who announced his departure from Honda on 1 December 2021.
- Nissan: NISMO announced their GT500 class drivers on 25 January 2022.
  - Bertrand Baguette transferred to Nissan and joined Team Impul, taking the place of Honda-bound Nobuharu Matsushita.
  - Mitsunori Takaboshi transferred from Kondo Racing to NDDP Racing, who were now wholly operated by NISMO. In exchange, two-time GT500 champion Kohei Hirate moved to Kondo Racing.

==== GT300 Class ====
- Audi Team Hitotsuyama and Toyota Team Thailand, who competed as arto Team Thailand in 2021, both announced that they would not take part in the 2022 Super GT season.
- Super Taikyu Series team SHADE Racing entered Super GT for the first time, with a Toyota GR86 GT300 riding on Dunlop tyres. Three-time GT300 championship runner-up Katsuyuki Hiranaka who had spent the previous 13 seasons at GAINER, and F4 Japanese Championship graduate Eijiro Shimizu were announced as the team's driver line-up.
- Takuro Shinohara transferred from Audi Team Hitotsuyama to K2 R&D LEON Racing, taking the place of Togo Suganami who switch to Super Formula Lights with B-Max Racing Team.
- ARTA saw two-time GT300 champion Shinichi Takagi and Ren Sato left the team, as Takagi moved to K-tunes Racing and Sato focus on Super Formula career. The team signed 2013 GT300 champion Hideki Mutoh, and Japanese F4 graduate Iori Kimura.
- Another Japanese F4 graduate, Kakunoshin Ohta, joined Team UpGarage, replacing reigning Super Formula Lights champion Teppei Natori.
- GAINER saw Kazuki Hoshino and Katsuyuki Hiranaka leaves the team as Hoshino retires and become Team Impul team principal, and Hiranaka moves to new team Shade Racing. The team signed Ryuichiro Tomita who previously raced for the team between 2015 and 2017 and Formula Regional Japanese Championship graduate Riki Okusa to drive their number 10 Nissan GT-R NISMO GT3. Formula Regional Japan driver Yusuke Shiotsu signed as the number 10 team's third driver. Keishi Ishikawa moved into their number 11 Nissan.
- Two-time GT300 champion Shinichi Takagi joined K-tunes Racing from ARTA, replacing GT500-bound Sena Sakaguchi. Takagi reuniting with three-time GT300 champion Morio Nitta in a driver pairing for the first time since 2010.
- BMW Team Studie × CSL changed to Michelin tyres for the 2022 season, the first GT300 team to use Michelin tyres since 2020. Studie announced BMW factory driver Augusto Farfus as one of their main drivers for 2022. GT300 race winner and reigning Super Taikyu ST-X class champion Tsubasa Kondo was signed as a third driver for the 450 km races, and replaced Farfus for the third round at Suzuka and at Autopolis.
- Yuui Tsutsumi, a first time race winner in 2021, transferred from Max Racing to muta Racing INGING.
- Reigning FIA F4 Japanese Champion, Seita Nonaka, joined Hoppy Team Tsuchiya in their new Toyota GR Supra.
- Kimiya Sato transferred to Max Racing after three seasons with Hoppy Team Tsuchiya. Max Racing withdrew from the first round following the death of team owner Tsuyoshi Oono, and began their season in the second round at Fuji Speedway
- Ryohei Sakaguchi transferred from muta Racing INGING to Arnage Racing. Ryosei Yamashita was announced as the team's third driver, and replaced Kano for the third round at Suzuka and the final round at Motegi.
- Drago Corse and vehicle customisation company Busou formed a collaborative entry, Busou Drago Corse. Two-time GT500 and GT300 champion Masataka Yanagida, and GT500 race winner Yuji Ide were named as the drivers. Drago Corse founder Ryo Michigami stepped away from driving duties to become the new team director, and Dunlop became the new tyre supplier, replacing Yokohama.
- Two-time Super Taikyu ST-3 champion and sim racer Yusuke Tomibayashi joined Team Mach for his Super GT debut, partnering the returning Reiji Hiraki.

=== Mid-season changes ===
==== GT300 Class ====
- Team LeMans terminated their contract with driver Satoshi Motoyama after the opening round of the season. The name of the team reverted from "Motoyama Racing with Team LeMans" back to Team LeMans. Former Formula 1 driver Roberto Merhi and GT300 race winner Shintaro Kawabata joined the team for the Fuji GT 450 km Race. Merhi would contest the remainder of the season alongside Yoshiaki Katayama.
- Drago Corse and Busou terminated their partnership, and the team did not return for the remainder of the season.
- Due to Takeshi Kimura's commitments in the European Le Mans Series, 2012 GT300 Champion Naoki Yokomizo joined Pacific CarGuy Racing for the opening round at Okayama. Yokomizo was the team's third driver in the Fuji 450 km in May. For the Fuji 100 Lap race in August, Shintaro Kawabata became the team's third driver. Yokomizo again replaced Kimura for the Suzuka 450 km.
- 2020 FIA F4 Japanese Champion Hibiki Taira joined apr for the two races at Fuji Speedway, as a third driver in the number 30 Toyota GR86 GT. Taira also joined the team for the Suzuka 450 km, while Hiroaki Nagai was replaced by Yuta Kamimura just before the Suzuka 450 km due to illness.
- Super Formula Lights driver Kazuto Kotaka joined apr for the Fuji 100 Lap race and Suzuka 450 km, as a third driver in the number 31 Toyota GR Sport Prius PHV GT.
- 2019 TCR Japan Sunday Series Champion Takeshi Suehiro joined Arnage Racing as a third driver for the three long-distance races at Fuji and Suzuka.
- Togo Suganami replaced Hiroki Yoshida for the Fuji GT 450 km Race, after Yoshida tested positive for COVID-19.
- Yusaku Shibata rejoined Tomei Sports as a third driver for the three long-distance races at Fuji and Suzuka. Shibata also took part in the Suzuka 300 km and in the sixth round at Sugo, replacing Atsushi Tanaka.
- Yuya Hiraki joined NILZZ Racing for the Suzuka 300 km, replacing Yuki Tanaka. For the following Fuji GT 100 Lap Race, Tanaka rejoined the team. Masaya Kohno made his series debut in the Fuji 100 Lap race and also competed in the Suzuka 450 km as a third driver.
- Yusuke Shiotsu replace Ryuichiro Tomita at Autopolis round as Tomita prioritise on GT World Challenge Europe campaign.
- Former Team UpGarage driver Teppei Natori joined Tomei Sports for the final round at Motegi.

== Results ==
Drivers credited with winning Pole Position for their respective teams are indicated in bold text.

Round	Circuit	Class	Pole position	Race winner
1	Okayama International Circuit	GT500	No. 14 TGR Team ENEOS ROOKIE	No. 14 TGR Team ENEOS ROOKIE
1	Okayama International Circuit	GT500	**(Japan) Kazuya Oshima** (Japan) Kenta Yamashita	(Japan) Kazuya Oshima (Japan) Kenta Yamashita
1	Okayama International Circuit	GT300	No. 61 R&D Sport	No. 56 Kondo Racing
1	Okayama International Circuit	GT300	(Japan) Takuto Iguchi **(Japan) Hideki Yamauchi**	(Japan) Kiyoto Fujinami (Brazil) Joao Paulo de Oliveira
2	Fuji Speedway	GT500	No. 19 TGR Team WedsSport Bandoh	No. 8 ARTA
2	Fuji Speedway	GT500	(Japan) Yuji Kunimoto **(Japan) Sena Sakaguchi**	(Japan) Tomoki Nojiri (Japan) Nirei Fukuzumi
2	Fuji Speedway	GT300	No. 61 R&D Sport	No. 10 GAINER
2	Fuji Speedway	GT300	(Japan) Takuto Iguchi **(Japan) Hideki Yamauchi**	(Japan) Ryuichiro Tomita (Japan) Riki Okusa (Japan) Yusuke Shiotsu (Note: Yusuke Shiotsu did not run during the race as a third driver and was ineligible for championship points.)
3	Suzuka Circuit	GT500	No. 19 TGR Team WedsSport Bandoh	No. 3 NDDP Racing
3	Suzuka Circuit	GT500	**(Japan) Yuji Kunimoto** (Japan) Sena Sakaguchi	(Japan) Katsumasa Chiyo (Japan) Mitsunori Takaboshi
3	Suzuka Circuit	GT300	No. 7 BMW Team Studie × CSL	No. 7 BMW Team Studie × CSL
3	Suzuka Circuit	GT300	(Japan) Seiji Ara (Japan) **Tsubasa Kondo**	(Japan) Seiji Ara (Japan) Tsubasa Kondo
4	Fuji Speedway	GT500	No. 19 TGR Team WedsSport Bandoh	No. 37 TGR Team KeePer TOM'S
4	Fuji Speedway	GT500	(Japan) Yuji Kunimoto **(Japan) Sena Sakaguchi**	(France) Sacha Fenestraz (Japan) Ritomo Miyata
4	Fuji Speedway	GT300	No. 65 K2 R&D LEON Racing	No. 61 R&D Sport
4	Fuji Speedway	GT300	(Japan) **Naoya Gamou** (Japan) Takuro Shinohara	(Japan) Takuto Iguchi (Japan) Hideki Yamauchi
5	Suzuka Circuit	GT500	No. 23 NISMO	No. 12 Team Impul
5	Suzuka Circuit	GT500	(Japan) Tsugio Matsuda **(Italy) Ronnie Quintarelli**	(Japan) Kazuki Hiramine (Belgium) Bertrand Baguette
5	Suzuka Circuit	GT300	No. 10 GAINER	No. 4 Goodsmile Racing & Team UKYO
5	Suzuka Circuit	GT300	(Japan) Ryuichiro Tomita (Japan) **Riki Okusa** (Japan) Yusuke Shiotsu	(Japan) Nobuteru Taniguchi (Japan) Tatsuya Kataoka
6	Sportsland Sugo	GT500	No. 19 TGR Team WedsSport Bandoh	No. 3 NDDP Racing
6	Sportsland Sugo	GT500	(Japan) Yuji Kunimoto **(Japan) Sena Sakaguchi**	(Japan) Katsumasa Chiyo (Japan) Mitsunori Takaboshi
6	Sportsland Sugo	GT300	No. 61 R&D Sport	No. 2 muta Racing INGING
6	Sportsland Sugo	GT300	(Japan) Takuto Iguchi **(Japan) Hideki Yamauchi**	(Japan) Hiroki Katoh (Japan) Yuui Tsutsumi
7	Autopolis	GT500	No. 24 Kondo Racing	No. 17 Astemo Real Racing
7	Autopolis	GT500	**(Japan) Daiki Sasaki** (Japan) Kohei Hirate	(Japan) Koudai Tsukakoshi (Japan) Nobuharu Matsushita
7	Autopolis	GT300	No. 61 R&D Sport	No. 52 Saitama Toyopet GreenBrave
7	Autopolis	GT300	(Japan) Takuto Iguchi **(Japan) Hideki Yamauchi**	(Japan) Hiroki Yoshida (Japan) Kohta Kawaai
8	Mobility Resort Motegi	GT500	No. 100 Team Kunimitsu	No. 100 Team Kunimitsu
8	Mobility Resort Motegi	GT500	(Japan) Naoki Yamamoto **(Japan) Tadasuke Makino**	(Japan) Naoki Yamamoto (Japan) Tadasuke Makino
8	Mobility Resort Motegi	GT300	No. 55 ARTA	No. 55 ARTA
8	Mobility Resort Motegi	GT300	(Japan) Hideki Mutoh **(Japan) Iori Kimura**	(Japan) Hideki Mutoh (Japan) Iori Kimura

== Championship standings ==
=== Drivers' championships ===
Scoring system

Position	1st	2nd	3rd	4th	5th	6th	7th	8th	9th	10th	Pole
Points	20	15	11	8	6	5	4	3	2	1	1

==== GT500 ====
Driver Ranking GT500 2022 Series
Rank	Driver	Team	OKA	FUJ1 (Note: Half points were awarded as 62 of 100 laps were completed when the race reached the time certain finish at 18:20 local time (75 laps needed for full points) as the race was stopped twice, for crash barrier damage on Lap 49 and Lap 58.)	SUZ1	FUJ2	SUZ2	SUG	AUT	MOT	Points
1	(Japan) Kazuki Hiramine (Belgium) Bertrand Baguette	No. 12 Team Impul	7	3	Ret	2	1	5	6	2	70.5
2	(Japan) Katsumasa Chiyo (Japan) Mitsunori Takaboshi	No. 3 NDDP Racing	5	15	1	12	4	1	7	4	66
3	(Japan) Naoki Yamamoto (Japan) Tadasuke Makino	No. 100 Team Kunimitsu	2	5	9	8	11	8	2	**1**	62
4	(Japan) Koudai Tsukakoshi (Japan) Nobuharu Matsushita	No. 17 Astemo Real Racing	9	9	2	10	2	12	1	5	60
5	(Japan) Kazuya Oshima (Japan) Kenta Yamashita	No. 14 TGR Team ENEOS ROOKIE	**1**	7	8	7	14	11	4	3	49
6	(France) Sacha Fenestraz (Japan) Ritomo Miyata	No. 37 TGR Team KeePer TOM'S	11	14	3	1	8	9	9	6	43
7	(Japan) Tsugio Matsuda (Italy) Ronnie Quintarelli	No. 23 NISMO	3	4	12	14	**5**	2	14	13	37
8	(Japan) Yuhi Sekiguchi (Japan) Yuichi Nakayama	No. 39 TGR Team SARD	8	13	4	6	3	6	10	Ret	33
9	(Japan) Daiki Sasaki (Japan) Kohei Hirate	No. 24 Kondo Racing	14	8	6	3	10	14	**3**	Ret	30.5
10	(Japan) Sho Tsuboi (France) Giuliano Alesi	No. 36 TGR Team au TOM'S	6	2	10	4	9	10	8	9	29.5
11	(Japan) Yuji Kunimoto (Japan) Sena Sakaguchi	No. 19 TGR Team WedsSport Bandoh	13	**6**	**5**	**9**	7	**15**	5	7	28.5
12	(Japan) Tomoki Nojiri (Japan) Nirei Fukuzumi	No. 8 ARTA	10	1	7	5	13	13	11	8	24
13	(Japan) Yuji Tachikawa (Japan) Hiroaki Ishiura	No. 38 TGR Team ZENT Cerumo	4	12	Ret	Ret	Ret	4	Ret	10	17
14	(Japan) Ukyo Sasahara (Japan) Toshiki Oyu	No. 16 Team Red Bull Mugen	12	10	13	13	6	3	12	11	16.5
15	(Japan) Takuya Izawa (Japan) Hiroki Otsu	No. 64 Modulo Nakajima Racing	15	11	11	11	12	7	13	12	4
Rank	Driver	Team	OKA	FUJ1	SUZ1	FUJ2	SUZ2	SUG	AUT	MOT	Points

Colour	Result
Gold	Winner
Silver	Second place
Bronze	Third place
Green	Points classification
Blue	Non-points classification
Blue	Non-classified finish (NC)
Purple	Retired, not classified (Ret)
Red	Did not qualify (DNQ)
Red	Did not pre-qualify (DNPQ)
Black	Disqualified (DSQ)
White	Did not start (DNS)
White	Withdrew (WD)
White	Race cancelled (C)
Blank	Did not practice (DNP)
Blank	Did not arrive (DNA)
Blank	Excluded (EX)

**Bold** – Pole
† — Did not finish but classified

==== GT300 ====
Driver Ranking GT300 2022 Series
Rank	Driver	Team	OKA	FUJ1 (Note: The race was ended after less than 75% of laps were completed. Therefore, half points were awarded.)	SUZ1	FUJ2	SUZ2	SUG	AUT	MOT	Points
1	(Japan) Kiyoto Fujinami (Brazil) Joao Paulo de Oliveira	No. 56 Kondo Racing	1	7	3	6	13	4	5	19	52
2	(Japan) Takuto Iguchi (Japan) Hideki Yamauchi	No. 61 R&D Sport	**9**	**3**	12	1	18	**8**	**2**	20	49.5
3	(Japan) Riki Okusa	No. 10 GAINER	6	1	15	22	**2**	3	7	8	49
4	(Japan) Kohta Kawaai	No. 52 Saitama Toyopet GreenBrave	Ret	9	4	14	4	18	1	3	48
5	(Japan) Hiroki Yoshida	No. 52 Saitama Toyopet GreenBrave	Ret		4	14	4	18	1	3	47
6	(Japan) Ryuichiro Tomita	No. 10 GAINER	6	1	15	22	**2**	3		8	45
7	(Japan) Hironobu Yasuda (Japan) Keishi Ishikawa	No. 11 GAINER	10	4	Ret	2	16	2	14	14	35
8	(Japan) Takashi Kobayashi (Japan) Kakunoshin Ohta	No. 18 Team UpGarage	2	13	Ret	3	14	11	19	4	34
9	(Japan) Nobuteru Taniguchi (Japan) Tatsuya Kataoka	No. 4 Goodsmile Racing & Team UKYO	7	16	11	13	1	Ret	6	7	33
10	(Japan) Naoya Gamou (Japan) Takuro Shinohara	No. 65 K2 R&D LEON Racing	3	15	13	**Ret**	6	6	3	18	33
11	(Japan) Seiji Ara	No. 7 BMW Team Studie × CSL	Ret	Ret	**1**	21	12	5	12	9	29
12	(Japan) Hideki Mutoh (Japan) Iori Kimura	No. 55 ARTA	15	Ret	10	Ret	24	7	18	**1**	26
13	(Japan) Takashi Kogure (Japan) Yuya Motojima	No. 88 JLOC	17	5	5	9	17	13	4	5	25
14	(Japan) Hiroki Katoh (Japan) Yuui Tsutsumi	No. 2 muta Racing INGING	20	8	14	18	8	1	Ret	12	24.5
15	(Japan) Kosuke Matsuura (Japan) Natsu Sakaguchi	No. 87 JLOC	8	12	16	8	9	19	11	2	23
16	(Japan) Morio Nitta (Japan) Shinichi Takagi	No. 96 K-tunes Racing	Ret	6	7	5	25	9	8	6	22.5
17	(Japan) Tsubasa Kondo	No. 7 BMW Team Studie × CSL		Ret	**1**		12		12		21
18	(Japan) Yusuke Tomibayashi (Japan) Reiji Hiraki	No. 5 Team Mach	18	24	2	17	19	21	25	Ret	15
19	(Japan) Manabu Orido	No. 30 apr	13	18	8	15	3	20	17	Ret	14
20	(Japan) Masataka Yanagida (Japan) Yuji Ide	No. 34 Busou Drago Corse	11	2	6						12.5
21	(Japan) Yoshiaki Katayama	No. 6 Team LeMans	5	14	18	16	5	16	20	13	12
22	(Japan) Hibiki Taira	No. 30 apr		18		15	3				11
22	(Japan) Yuta Kamimura	No. 30 apr					3				11
23	(Japan) Hiroki Yoshimoto (Japan) Shunsuke Kohno	No. 60 LM Corsa	12	17	9	4	10	15	22	11	11
24	(Japan) Kei Cozzolino	No. 9 Pacific CarGuy Racing	4	23	17	12	11	Ret	13	15	8
24	(Japan) Naoki Yokomizo	No. 9 Pacific CarGuy Racing	4				11				8
25	(Brazil) Augusto Farfus	No. 7 BMW Team Studie × CSL	Ret	Ret		21	12	5		9	8
26	(Spain) Roberto Merhi Muntan	No. 6 Team LeMans		14	18	16	5	16	20	13	6
26	(Japan) Satoshi Motoyama	No. 6 Team LeMans	5								6
27	(Japan) Katsuyuki Hiranaka (Japan) Eijiro Shimizu	No. 20 SHADE Racing	14	20	Ret	Ret	7	23	9	21	6
28	(Japan) Yusuke Shiotsu	No. 10 GAINER		1		22	**2** (Note: Yusuke Shiotsu did not run during the race as a third driver and was ineligible for championship points.)		7		5
29	(Japan) Ryohei Sakaguchi	No. 50 Arnage Racing	16	25	20	7	23	22	21	16	4
29	(Japan) Masaki Kano	No. 50 Arnage Racing	16	25		7	23	22	21		4
29	(Japan) Takeshi Suehiro	No. 50 Arnage Racing		25		7	23				4
30	(Japan) Hiroaki Nagai	No. 30 apr	13	18	8	15		20	17	Ret	3
31	(Japan) Takayuki Aoki	No. 360 Tomei Sports	21	10	19	10	20	12	23	10	2.5
32	(Japan) Yusaku Shibata	No. 360 Tomei Sports		10	19	10	20	12	23		1.5
33	(Japan) Togo Suganami	No. 52 Saitama Toyopet GreenBrave		9							1
34	(Japan) Takamitsu Matsui (Japan) Seita Nonaka	No. 25 Hoppy Team Tsuchiya	22	11	Ret		15	10	16	Ret	1
35	(Japan) Kimiya Sato (Japan) Atsushi Miyake	No. 244 Max Racing		19	22	Ret	Ret	14	10	17	1
36	(Japan) Teppei Natori	No. 360 Tomei Sports								10	1
37	(Japan) Atsushi Tanaka	No. 360 Tomei Sports	21	10		10 (Note: Atsushi Tanaka did not run during the race as a third driver and was ineligible for championship points.)	20				0.5
-	(Japan) Shinnosuke Yamada	No. 20 SHADE Racing					7 (Note: Shinnosuke Yamada did not run during the race as a third driver and was ineligible for championship points.)				0
-	(Japan) Koki Saga (Japan) Yuhki Nakayama	No. 31 apr	19	22	23	11	26	17	15	Ret	0
-	(Japan) Kazuto Kotaka	No. 31 apr				11	26				0
-	(Japan) Takeshi Kimura	No. 9 Pacific CarGuy Racing		23	17	12		Ret	13	15	0
-	(Japan) Shintaro Kawabata	No. 6 Team LeMans		14							0
-	(Japan) Shintaro Kawabata	No. 9 Pacific CarGuy Racing				12					0
-	(Japan) Ryosei Yamashita	No. 50 Arnage Racing			20					16	0
-	(Japan) Taiyo Ida	No. 48 NILZZ Racing	23	21	21	19	22	25	26	23	0
-	(Japan) Yuki Tanaka	No. 48 NILZZ Racing	23	21		19	22	25	26	23	0
-	(Japan) Masaya Kohno	No. 48 NILZZ Racing				19	22				0
-	(Japan) Masaki Jyonai (Japan) Hisashi Wada	No. 22 R'Qs Motor Sports	Ret	Ret		20	21	24	24	22	0
-	(Japan) Yuya Hiraki	No. 48 NILZZ Racing			21						0
Rank	Driver	Team	OKA	FUJ1	SUZ1	FUJ2	SUZ2	SUG	AUT	MOT	Points
