= 2008 Formula Challenge Japan =

Japanese formula racing season

The 2008 Formula Challenge Japan was a multi-event motor racing championship for open-wheel formula racing cars, and the third season of the Formula Challenge Japan racing series, a young driver development series jointly supported by Honda, Toyota, and Nissan. The championship featured a mix of manufacturer-affiliated drivers and independent entries, and commenced on 5 April and ended on 21 September. All but one of the race weekends were run in support of the Formula Nippon Championship.

Toyota junior driver Yūji Kunimoto, whose brother Keisuke had won the previous year's title, dominated the championship in his second year of competition. Kunimoto took eight wins and seven pole positions from the season's sixteen races, and finished all but one race on the podium to secure a 101-point lead over his nearest rival, Nissan junior and former Formula BMW UK driver Kimiya Satō. Nissan stablemate Katsumasa Chiyo won thrice to finish third in the standings, while Takamitsu Matsui and Tsubasa Mekaru took the remaining race victories.

== Teams and drivers ==
Team	No.	Driver	Rounds
XGamut Mitsuba-ya FCJ	1	(Japan) Hikaru Abe	All
C-SPAN San-M FCJ	2	(Japan) Kazuumi Kobayashi	All
Rêve RT FCJ	3	(Japan) Kazuki Kawamura	All
SRS-F Scholarship; SRS-F SANAI FCJ	4	(Japan) Takashi Kobayashi	All
SRS-F Scholarship; SRS-F SANAI FCJ	6	(Japan) Shigetomo Shimono	All
SRS-F Scholarship; SRS-F SANAI FCJ	15	(Japan) Kazuki Miura	All
SRS-F Scholarship; SRS-F SANAI FCJ	26	(Japan) Kazuma Kokubu	All
FTRS; TDP Scholarship; Sugamata Sekkotsuin FTRS; Café Julia FTRS; Team Samurai FTRS; FTRS Team NATS; Citykart FTRS	5	(Japan) Naoya Gamou	All
FTRS; TDP Scholarship; Sugamata Sekkotsuin FTRS; Café Julia FTRS; Team Samurai FTRS; FTRS Team NATS; Citykart FTRS	8	(Japan) Yūji Kunimoto	All
FTRS; TDP Scholarship; Sugamata Sekkotsuin FTRS; Café Julia FTRS; Team Samurai FTRS; FTRS Team NATS; Citykart FTRS	9	(Japan) Tsubasa Mekaru	All
FTRS; TDP Scholarship; Sugamata Sekkotsuin FTRS; Café Julia FTRS; Team Samurai FTRS; FTRS Team NATS; Citykart FTRS	13	(Japan) Toshihiro Hinata	All
FTRS; TDP Scholarship; Sugamata Sekkotsuin FTRS; Café Julia FTRS; Team Samurai FTRS; FTRS Team NATS; Citykart FTRS	17	(Japan) Tohjirō Azuma	All
FTRS; TDP Scholarship; Sugamata Sekkotsuin FTRS; Café Julia FTRS; Team Samurai FTRS; FTRS Team NATS; Citykart FTRS	20	(Japan) Takamitsu Matsui	All
FTRS; TDP Scholarship; Sugamata Sekkotsuin FTRS; Café Julia FTRS; Team Samurai FTRS; FTRS Team NATS; Citykart FTRS	21	(Japan) Makoto Kanai	All
FTRS; TDP Scholarship; Sugamata Sekkotsuin FTRS; Café Julia FTRS; Team Samurai FTRS; FTRS Team NATS; Citykart FTRS	22	(Japan) Yūichi Nakayama	All
FTRS; TDP Scholarship; Sugamata Sekkotsuin FTRS; Café Julia FTRS; Team Samurai FTRS; FTRS Team NATS; Citykart FTRS	23	(Japan) Kōta Matsui	All
Iwasaki Industry	7	(Japan) Yūki Iwasaki	All
NDDP; NDDP MyBrans	10	(Japan) Kimiya Satō	All
NDDP; NDDP MyBrans	12	(Japan) Daiki Sasaki	All
NDDP; NDDP MyBrans	18	(Japan) Katsumasa Chiyo	All
NDDP; NDDP MyBrans	19	(Japan) Masayuki Yamashita	All
DL Team Naoki	11	(Japan) Mika Kagoshima	All
Broval.jp NAC	14	(Japan) Kenji Hosokawa	All
A-Project FCJ	16	(Japan) Kōta Lee	All
H.I.S. Travel FCJ	24	(Ukraine) Igor Sushko	All
Winds Nikoya FCJ	25	(Japan) Kōtarō Hatano	All

== Race calendar and results ==
All races were held in Japan. All rounds, with the exception of rounds 7–8, were run in support of Formula Nippon.

Round	Circuit	Date	Pole position	Fastest lap	Winning driver
1	Fuji Speedway, Oyama	5 April	(Japan) Takamitsu Matsui	(Japan) Yūji Kunimoto	(Japan) Takamitsu Matsui
2	Fuji Speedway, Oyama	6 April	(Japan) Yūji Kunimoto	(Japan) Takamitsu Matsui	(Japan) Yūji Kunimoto
3	Suzuka Circuit, Suzuka	10 May	(Japan) Takamitsu Matsui	(Japan) Kenji Hosokawa	(Japan) Katsumasa Chiyo
4	Suzuka Circuit, Suzuka	11 May	(Japan) Katsumasa Chiyo	(Japan) Katsumasa Chiyo	(Japan) Katsumasa Chiyo
5	Twin Ring Motegi, Motegi	24 May	(Japan) Takamitsu Matsui	(Japan) Yūji Kunimoto	(Japan) Yūji Kunimoto
6	Twin Ring Motegi, Motegi	25 May	(Japan) Yūji Kunimoto	(Japan) Takamitsu Matsui	(Japan) Katsumasa Chiyo
7	Fuji Speedway, Oyama	28 June	(Japan) Yūji Kunimoto	(Japan) Yūji Kunimoto	(Japan) Yūji Kunimoto
8	Fuji Speedway, Oyama	29 June	(Japan) Yūji Kunimoto	(Japan) Takamitsu Matsui	(Japan) Takamitsu Matsui
9	Suzuka Circuit, Suzuka	12 July	(Japan) Yūji Kunimoto	(Japan) Kimiya Satō	(Japan) Yūji Kunimoto
10	Suzuka Circuit, Suzuka	13 July	(Japan) Naoya Gamou	(Japan) Kimiya Satō	(Japan) Kimiya Satō
11	Twin Ring Motegi, Motegi	9 August	(Japan) Tsubasa Mekaru	(Japan) Takashi Kobayashi	(Japan) Tsubasa Mekaru
12	Twin Ring Motegi, Motegi	10 August	(Japan) Kimiya Satō	(Japan) Takashi Kobayashi	(Japan) Takamitsu Matsui
13	Fuji Speedway, Oyama	30 August	(Japan) Masayuki Yamashita	(Japan) Kimiya Satō	(Japan) Yūji Kunimoto
14	Fuji Speedway, Oyama	31 August	(Japan) Makoto Kanai	(Japan) Yūji Kunimoto	(Japan) Yūji Kunimoto
15	Sportsland SUGO, Murata	20 September	(Japan) Yūji Kunimoto	(Japan) Yūji Kunimoto	(Japan) Yūji Kunimoto
16	Sportsland SUGO, Murata	21 September	(Japan) Yūji Kunimoto	(Japan) Takamitsu Matsui	(Japan) Yūji Kunimoto

== Championship standings ==
=== Drivers' Championship ===
Points were awarded to the top ten classified finishers, with one point awarded for pole position and fastest lap respectively.

1	2	3	4	5	6	7	8	9	10	PP	FL
20	15	12	10	8	6	4	3	2	1	**1**	1

Pos.	Driver	FUJ		SUZ		MOT		FUJ		SUZ		MOT		FUJ		SUG		Points
1	(Japan) Yūji Kunimoto	2	**1**	3	3	1	**2**	**1**	**4**	**1**	3	3	3	1	1	**1**	**1**	272
2	(Japan) Kimiya Satō	4	6	4	6	6	7	2	2	2	1	14	**2**	3	3	6	2	171
3	(Japan) Katsumasa Chiyo	3	14	1	**1**	2	1	7	9	7	5	15	4	2	21	7	Ret	136
4	(Japan) Takamitsu Matsui	**1**	2	**DNS**	22	**23**	6	3	1	10	16	6	1	4	14	9	4	129
5	(Japan) Makoto Kanai	16	15	6	5	13	16	13	5	21	10	2	5	9	**2**	5	6	78
6	(Japan) Masayuki Yamashita	14	10	Ret	2	12	4	4	3	3	6	Ret	24	**17**	12	18	17	67
7	(Japan) Tsubasa Mekaru	7	5	Ret	4	4	Ret	9	Ret	12	19	**1**	6	16	9	DNS	15	63
8	(Japan) Naoya Gamou	13	12	13	7	24	Ret	6	Ret	4	**2**	10	10	15	22	3	3	62
9	(Japan) Takashi Kobayashi	5	3	Ret	16	Ret	9	26	13	11	9	7	8	8	Ret	2	21	51
10	(Japan) Kazuki Miura	6	19	11	Ret	25	3	23	6	5	4	22	17	Ret	24	10	8	46
11	(Japan) Kōta Lee	17	Ret	7	14	7	8	5	24	Ret	12	17	11	5	6	12	10	34
12	(Japan) Tohjirō Azuma	11	13	Ret	8	5	18	10	11	18	18	8	7	14	4	11	7	33
13	(Japan) Yūichi Nakayama	10	4	8	13	20	Ret	12	8	6	Ret	5	Ret	11	10	13	13	32
14	(Japan) Kenji Hosokawa	18	8	2	18	11	Ret	14	7	13	11	21	12	7	7	15	Ret	31
15	(Japan) Daiki Sasaki	9	11	Ret	12	10	DNS	15	21	15	14	Ret	18	12	5	4	5	29
16	(Japan) Kazuma Kokubu	23	21	5	Ret	8	Ret	8	10	16	21	4	9	13	13	14	12	27
17	(Japan) Yūki Iwasaki	8	9	9	11	3	12	11	14	14	13	12	14	18	11	16	16	19
18	(Japan) Toshihiro Hinata	12	7	Ret	9	18	5	17	16	9	Ret	Ret	21	10	18	19	9	19
19	(Japan) Shigetomo Shimono	15	16	DNS	20	9	10	16	15	Ret	7	11	15	22	8	22	14	10
20	(Japan) Hikaru Abe	20	24	15	Ret	15	14	21	12	8	22	9	13	19	19	8	18	8
21	(Japan) Kōtarō Hatano	26	22	10	15	14	13	19	20	17	15	Ret	23	6	15	20	11	7
22	(Ukraine) Igor Sushko	22	18	12	10	19	15	22	19	Ret	8	13	16	24	16	17	22	4
-	(Japan) Kazuumi Kobayashi	21	23	14	19	17	11	18	18	19	20	18	19	20	17	24	20	0
-	(Japan) Mika Kagoshima	25	20	16	21	16	Ret	24	17	23	23	16	Ret	21	20	23	24	0
-	(Japan) Kōta Matsui	19	17	Ret	Ret	21	17	25	22	22	24	19	22	23	23	21	23	0
-	(Japan) Kazuki Kawamura	24	25	Ret	17	22	Ret	20	23	20	17	20	20	Ret	25	Ret	19	0
Pos.	Driver	FUJ		SUZ		MOT		FUJ		SUZ		MOT		FUJ		SUG		Points

Key
Colour	Result
Gold	Race winner
Silver	2nd place
Bronze	3rd place
Green	Points finish
Blue	Non-points finish
Blue	Non-classified finish (NC)
Purple	Did not finish (Ret)
Black	Disqualified (DSQ)
Black	Excluded (EX)
White	Did not start (DNS)
White	Race cancelled (C)
White	Withdrew (WD)
Blank	Did not participate

**Bold** – Pole
Italics – Fastest Lap
