= General Motors proving grounds =

General Motors operates several proving grounds.

== North America ==
=== Desert Proving Ground Yuma ===
32.919818°N 114.323366°W

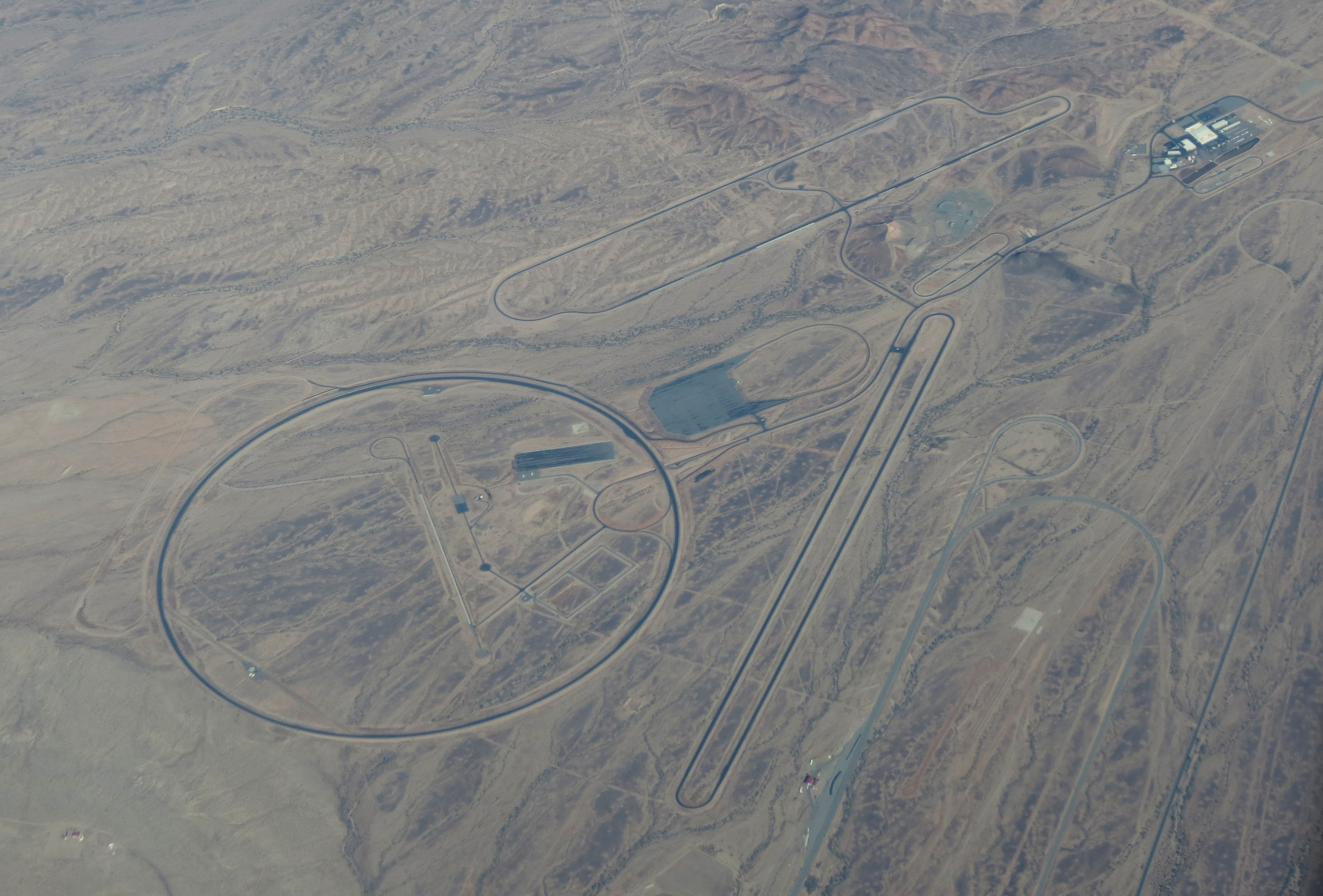
General Motors Desert Proving Ground in Yuma County, Arizona

Desert Proving Ground Yuma is a facility co-built and leased by General Motors located within the US Army's Yuma Proving Ground, near Yuma, Arizona. The facility came fully online as of July 2009. The site contains an inner facility sitting on 2,400 acres (970 ha) with a 24-acre (9.7 ha) campus containing 98,000 square feet (9,100 m^{2}) of building area and also has 40 miles (64 km) of roadway. One of the main reasons that this site was chosen was the already imposed no fly zone which helps prevent unwanted photography of pre-production prototypes undergoing testing. The facility is also used by the US Army for their own testing requirements.

Other such features are:

- 3.5 miles (5.6 km) circle track (3 lanes)
- 1.4 miles (2.3 km) straight track (2–3 lanes)
- 3.1 miles (5.0 km) Ride Road (2–4 lanes)
- 1,000 by 1,000 feet (300 m × 300 m) Dynamics Pad
- Interior Noise Road
- Noise Pass-by Facility
- Misc. grades
- 72,000-square-foot (6,700 m^{2}) main building
- Garage (40 hoists)
- Office (120 residents/visitors)
- Product Electronics/Instrumentation Lab
- Alignment/Tire facilities
- Transmission Build Room
- Machine/Fab shop
- Parts Crib
- Warehouse 14,000 square feet (1,300 m^{2})
- Sundrella (40 hoists)
- Covered parking
- Fuel facility
- Car wash
- Scale House / Ballast Station

=== Milford Proving Ground ===
42.583603°N 83.684449°W

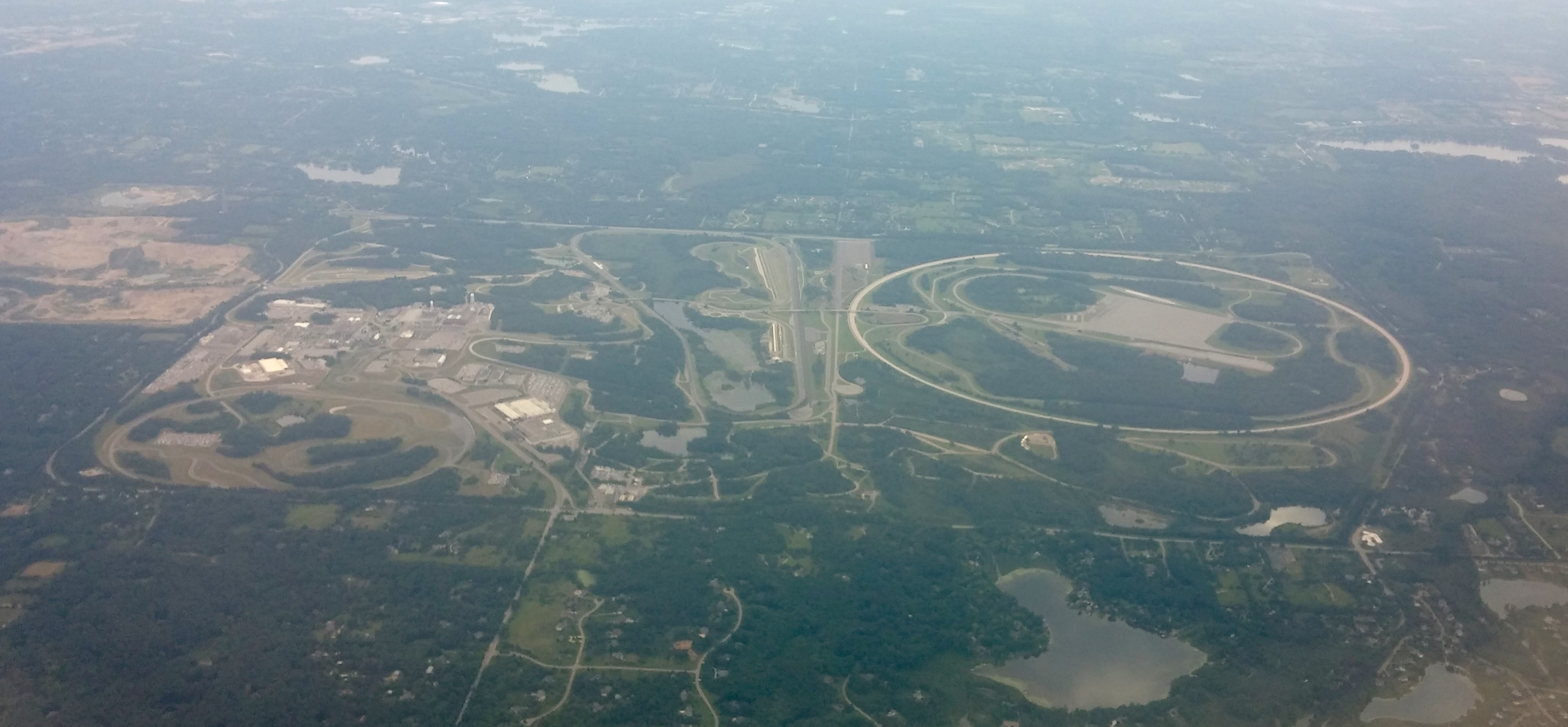
Aerial photograph of the GM proving grounds in Milford, Michigan

The General Motors Milford Proving Ground was the industry's first dedicated automobile testing facility when it opened in 1924. It is the longest continuously operating proving ground in the world. It is located in Milford, Michigan and covers 4,000 acres (1,600 ha). 4,800 staff work in its 142 buildings today, The proving ground includes the equivalent of 132 miles (212 km) of roads representative of conditions found on public roadways and other specialty surfaces for vehicle testing. Some roads are open only to drivers who have passed special performance driving training.

Facilities

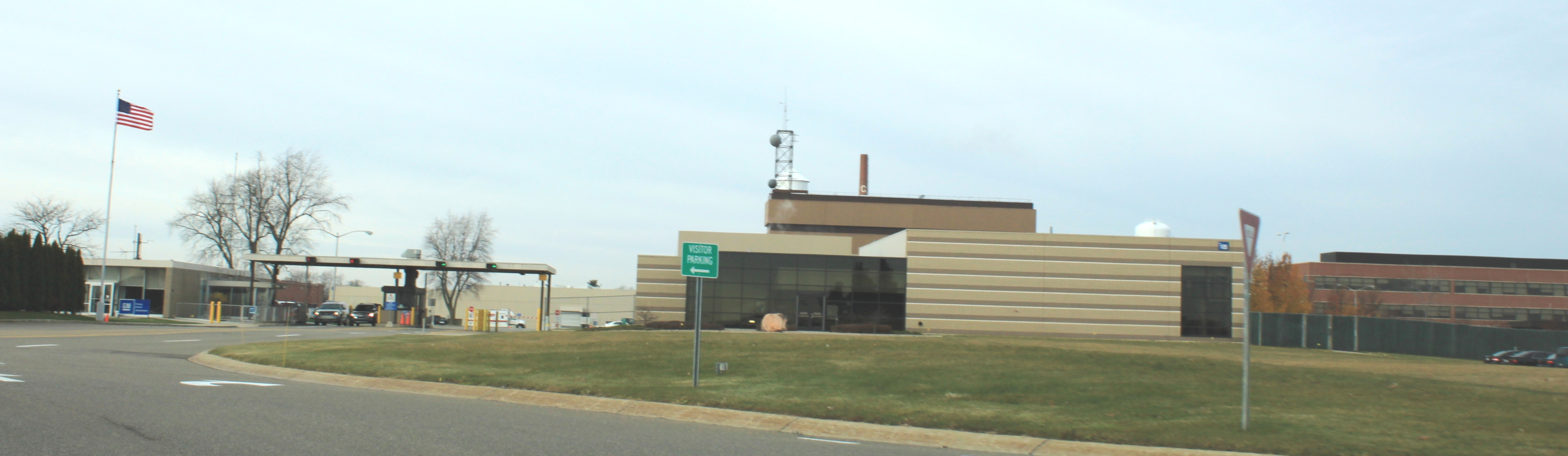
Milford Proving Ground main gate, General Motors Rd.

- The VDTA ("Vehicle Dynamics Test Area"), also known as "Black Lake", is a 67-acre (270,000 m^{2}) pad of blacktop for vehicle dynamics testing. Waterfowl have been known to try to land on this "lake" of asphalt. At the ends of the VDTA are two semicircle tracks used for accelerating vehicles up to high speed before entering the pad. A controlled low-friction area made of ceramic tiles is on one side of the pad. Another area is coated with the asphalt sealant Jennite and can be watered down to produce a low friction surface.
- The Oval Track is a 3.8 miles (6.1 km) circuit
- The Circle Track encloses the VDTA and is a 4.5 miles (7.2 km) banked circle. It has five lanes posted with speed limits increasing towards the outermost lane. The speed limit for the outermost lane is 100+ MPH (160+ km/h). Due to the banking, each lane can be driven at its posted speed all the way around the circle without needing to touch the steering wheel, given proper wheel alignment and tire pressures. The track surface is extremely hard "dolomite" concrete for wear resistance.
- The North/South Straightaway is 6.225 miles (10.018 km) in total length and includes two 2.5 miles (4.0 km) straightaways
- The East/West Straightaway is 3.1 miles (5.0 km) around and includes two 1.2 mi (1.9 km)straightaways
- "Seven Sisters" is a short course featuring seven tight curves, some level, some banked. It is one lane that can be driven in both directions, so only one car is allowed on the course at a time. This is used for testing vehicles under transient lateral acceleration loads.
- 12 Mile Road is a straight section of pavement which duplicates the historical surface texture of a section of 12 Mile Road near Detroit.
- The Ride and Handling loop is enclosed by the Circle Track and has varied surfaces and turns.
- The Vehicle Safety & Crashworthiness Lab includes a recently added rollover test facility.

=== Cupuán Proving Ground ===
18.783056°N 102.168611°W

General Motors Proving Ground Cupuan del Rio is situated between Lázaro Cárdenas and Uruapan, Michoacán, Mexico. The facility opened in 2006 and features a circle track, several off-road courses, and is primarily used for testing HVAC systems.

As of 2011 the grounds are mostly abandoned, and only a local security staff remains. This is due to the volatile, potentially unsafe situation in the region and the access routes to/from Cupuán.

== South America ==
=== Cruz Alta Proving Ground, Brazil ===
23.1425°S 47.269444°W

General Motors Cruz Alta Proving Ground at Indaiatuba, Brazil

- Founded in 1974
- Proving Ground facilities
- It is the largest and most comprehensive proving ground in Latin America, and the second largest in the General Motors Corporation. It comprises the most advanced test tracks, which precisely replicate the most varied and demanding road conditions.
- GM do Brasil is committed to the preservation of forests and the animal species that live there. Cruz Alta Proving Ground for example, has test roads and tracks that sit amid a forest reserve of 4,600,000 square meters (50,000,000 sq ft), including 22,270,000 square meters (239,700,000 sq ft) of reforested trees. The Proving Ground also features 100,000 square meters (1,100,000 sq ft) of Atlantic Forest original vegetation; 10,000 planted fruit trees and more than 1,000,000 square meters (11,000,000 sq ft) of lawns. In addition, GM do Brasil recently partnered with IBAMA, the Brazilian Environment Protection Agency, to monitor the abundant proliferation of capybaras at that location.

== Europa ==
=== Testzentrum Dudenhofen ===
49.992777°N 8.923055°E

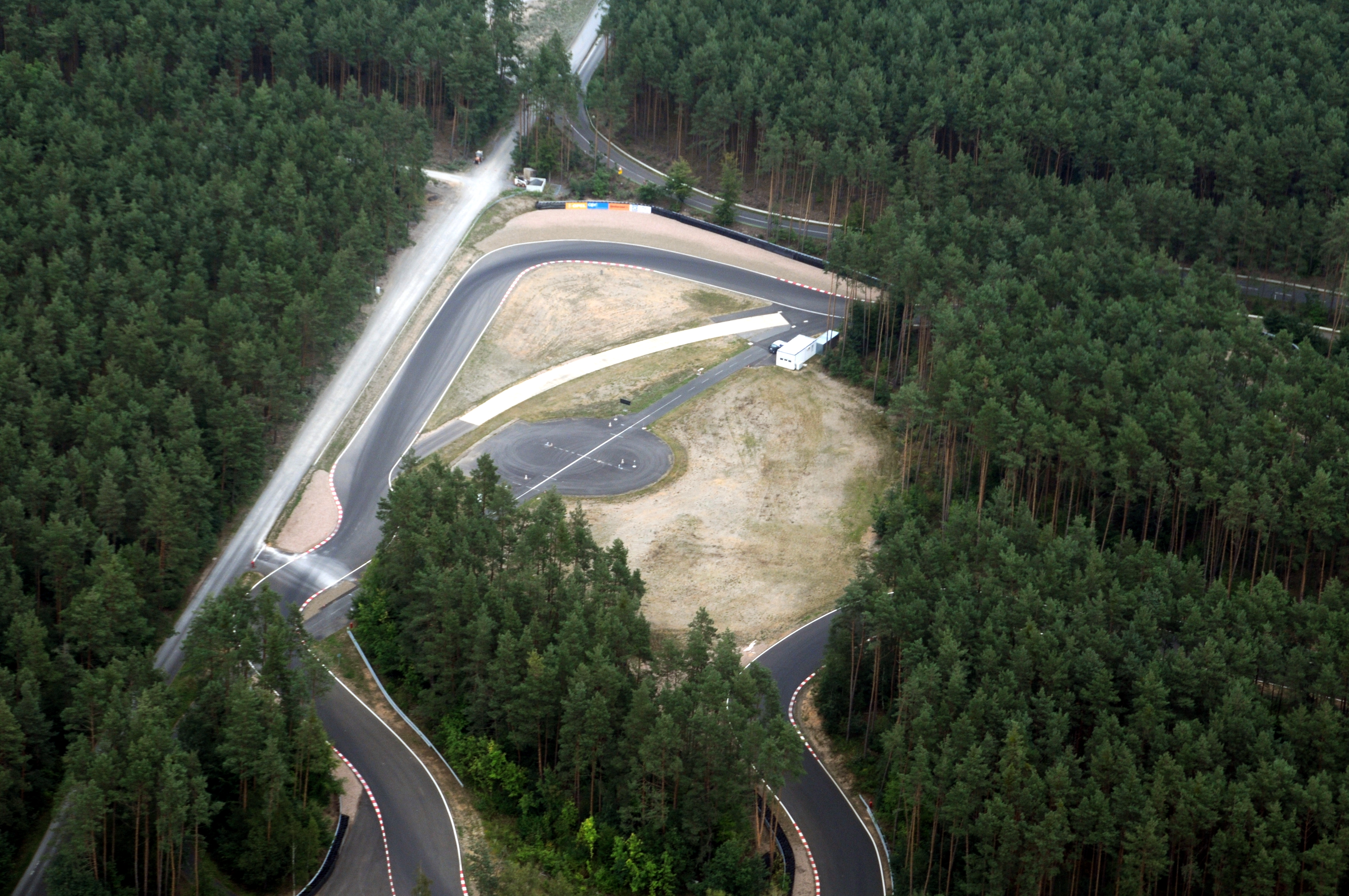
Opel test track in Dudenhofen

Opel, which since 2017 is not owned by General Motors, operates a proving ground near Dudenhofen, Germany , opened in 1964. Facilities include a 4.8 kilometers (3.0 mi) high-speed circuit, a 900 meters (980 yd) section of Belgian pavé and a hill circuit with gradients up to 30%.

=== Arjeplog ===
66°4′10″N 17°58′58″E

Opel, which since 2017 is not owned by General Motors, operates a winter climate proving ground near Arjeplog, Sweden. Most of the tracks are on the lake ice. Arjeplog has an average temperature of −11 °C (12 °F) in January.

== Australia ==
=== Lang Lang Proving Ground ===
38.353889°S 145.590833°E

The Lang Lang Proving Ground is a vehicle testing facility located at Lang Lang, Victoria, Australia, approximately 90 kilometers (56 mi) south-east of Melbourne.

It was opened in 1957 by Holden on a 2,152 acres (871 ha) site off the Bass Highway. It was used to test every Holden model from the Holden FC onwards. It is a dedicated 877-hectare site with 44 kilometers (27 mi) of road systems, including a 4.7 kilometers (2.9 mi) 4 lane circular track (speed bowl), 5.5 kilometers (3.4 mi) and handling course, a 1.8 kilometers (1.1 mi) noise road and 98 meters (107 yd) diameter skid pan. It is also equipped with an Emissions Laboratory and Safety Test Facility with crash barrier and HYGE sled.

In February 2020 GM announced the test track and design centre would close with all jobs being redundant to reflect the GM decision to quit global right hand drive vehicle production. In September 2020, it was sold to VinFast for around AU$35,000,000. It will continue to be used by GM Specialty Vehicles. In October 2021, VinFast disbanded its local engineering operations and put the Lang Lang Proving Ground test track up for sale. As of 2024, VinFast has not found a buyer for the track. In 2025, Great Wall Motors (GWM) began using the facility. GWM is considering purchasing the proving ground as of October 2025. It was sold in 2026 to an Australian defence contractor, DefendTex for AU$20,350,000.

== Asia ==
=== Guangde County, Anhui, China ===
31.044266°N 119.425751°E

Shanghai GM (SGM) and Pan Asia Technical Automotive Center (PATAC), both joint-ventures of SAIC Motor with GM China, opened in September 2012 China's largest proving ground in Guangde County, Anhui, China.

== Proposed / Closed Proving Grounds Facilities ==
=== Mezcala Proving Ground ===
GM's proposed facility at Mezcala, Mexico was terminated in the planning phase due to breakdown in land negotiations. The facility was to take over Desert Proving Ground (DPG) tasks when GM announced DPG's closing in 2000. DPG was closed in 2009 and replaced with a new facility in Yuma, Arizona.

=== Desert (Mesa) Proving Ground ===
33.324265°N 111.620192°W

GM Desert Proving Ground in Mesa, Arizona, USA was a General Motors facility for the testing of HVAC, propulsion, and various automotive systems in a harsh climate. Opened in 1953, the closure of this facility was completed in 2009. It was replaced by a new facility in Yuma, Arizona, known as the Desert Proving Ground Yuma.

== See also ==
- Nardò Ring
- Ehra-Lessien (Volkswagen)
- Fiorano Circuit (Ferrari)
- Ford Proving Grounds
- Mazda Proving Grounds
- Nissan Proving Grounds
