= Sasaharada Station =

Railway station in Ichikai, Tochigi Prefecture, Japan

Sasaharada Station 笹原田駅
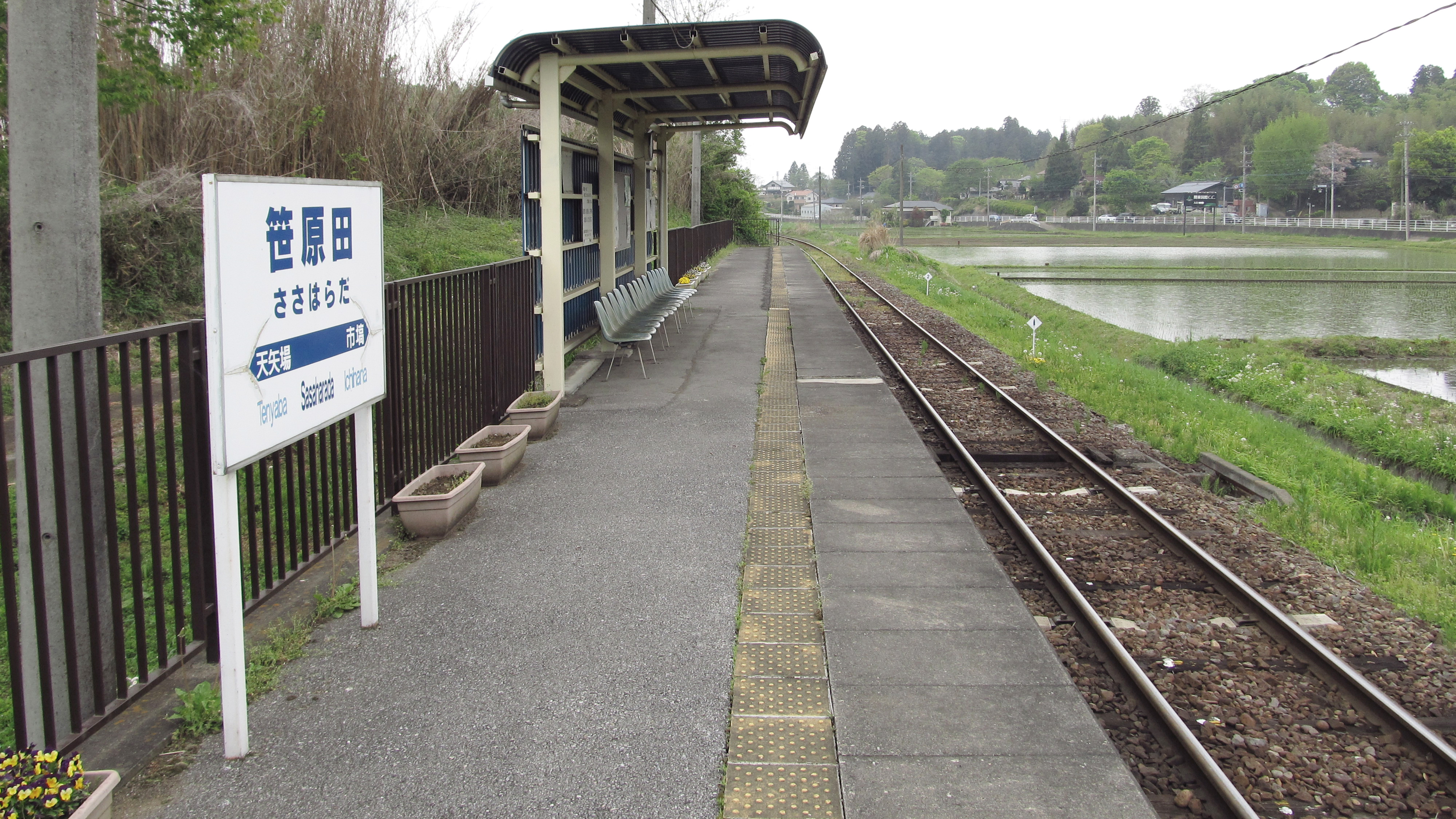
- Sasaharada Station (May 2014)

General information
- Location: Sasaharada, Ichikai, Haga, Tochigi （栃木県芳賀郡市貝町笹原田） Japan
- Coordinates: 36°32′02″N 140°08′41″E
- Operator: Mooka Railway
- Line: Mooka Line
- Platforms: 1 (1 side platform)

History
- Opened: March 14, 1992

Passengers
- FY 2012: 3 daily

Services
Preceding station	Mooka Railway	Following station
Ichihana towards Shimodate	Mooka Line	Ten'yaba towards Motegi
Location

Sasaharada Station (笹原田駅, Sasaharada-eki) is a railway station in Ichikai, Tochigi Prefecture, Japan, operated by the Mooka Railway.

== Lines ==
Sasaharada Station is a station on the Mooka Line, and is located 38.1 rail kilometers from the terminus of the line at Shimodate Station.

== Station layout ==
Sasaharada Station has one side platform. There is no station building, but there is a small shelter built onto the platform. The station is unattended.

== History ==
Sasaharada Station opened on 14 March 1992.

== Surrounding area ==
- Ichikai Country Club
- Kanto Kokusai Country Club
- Kumano Jinja
