= Ten'yaba Station =

Railway station in Motegi, Tochigi Prefecture, Japan

Ten'yaba Station 天矢場駅
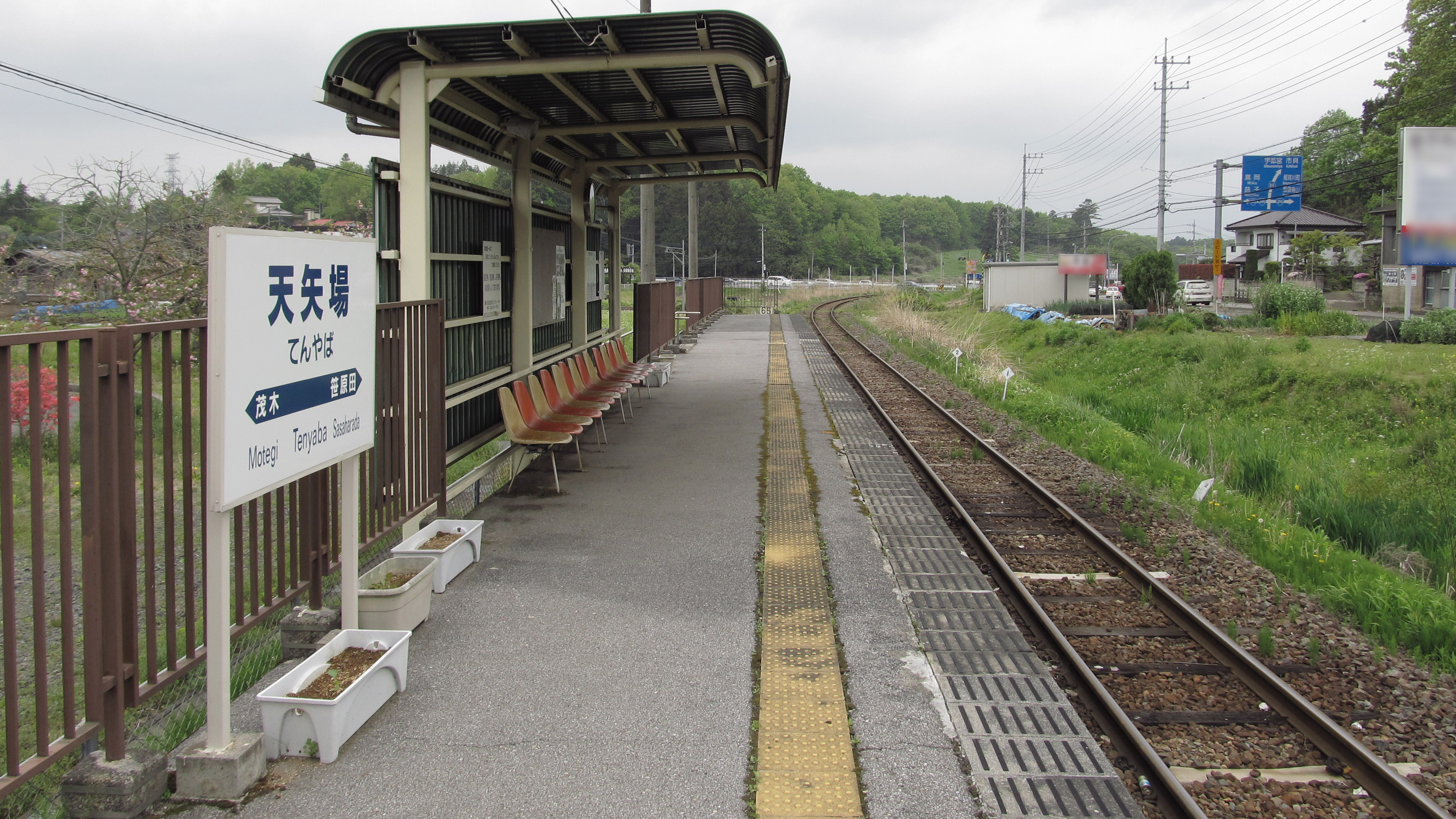
- Ten'yaba Station (May 2014)

General information
- Location: Kitatakaoka, Motegi, Haga, Tochigi （栃木県芳賀郡茂木町北高岡） Japan
- Coordinates: 36°31′45″N 140°09′23″E
- Operator: Mooka Railway
- Line: Mooka Line
- Platforms: 1 (1 side platform)

History
- Opened: 14 March 1992

Passengers
- FY 2015: 11 daily

Services
Preceding station	Mooka Railway	Following station
Sasaharada towards Shimodate	Mooka Line	Motegi Terminus
Location

Ten'yaba Station (天矢場駅, Ten'yaba-eki) is a railway station in Motegi, Tochigi Prefecture, Japan, operated by the Mooka Railway.

== Lines ==
Ten'yaba Station is a station on the Mooka Line, and is located 39.2 rail kilometers from the terminus of the line at Shimodate Station.

== Station layout ==
Ten'yaba Station has one side platform. There is no station building, but there is a small shelter built onto the platform. The station is unattended.

== History ==
Ten'yaba Station opened on 14 March 1992.

== Surrounding area ==
- Japan National Route 123
- Japan National Route 294
