= Kimiya Sato =

Japanese racing driver

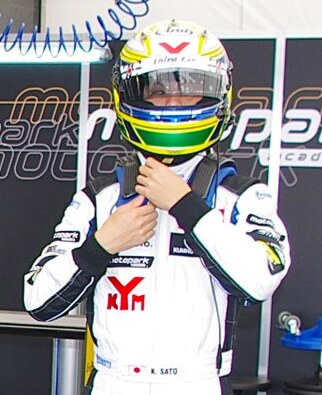
- Sato in 2011
- Nationality: (Japan) Japanese
- Born: 5 October 1989 (age 37) Kobe, Hyōgo Prefecture, Japan

GP2 Series career
- Debut season: 2014
- Current team: Campos Racing
- Categorisation: FIA Gold (until 2022); FIA Silver (2023–)
- Car number: 27
- Starts: 20
- Wins: 0
- Poles: 0
- Fastest laps: 0
- Best finish: 27th in 2014

Previous series
- 2013-14 2012 2011 2011 2009–10 2008 2008 2006–07 2004: Auto GP; German Formula Three; Formula 3 Euro Series; FIA Formula 3 International Trophy; All Japan Formula Three; Formula Challenge Japan; Formula BMW Pacific; Formula BMW UK; Asia-Pacific Championship ICA

Championship titles
- 2014: Auto GP

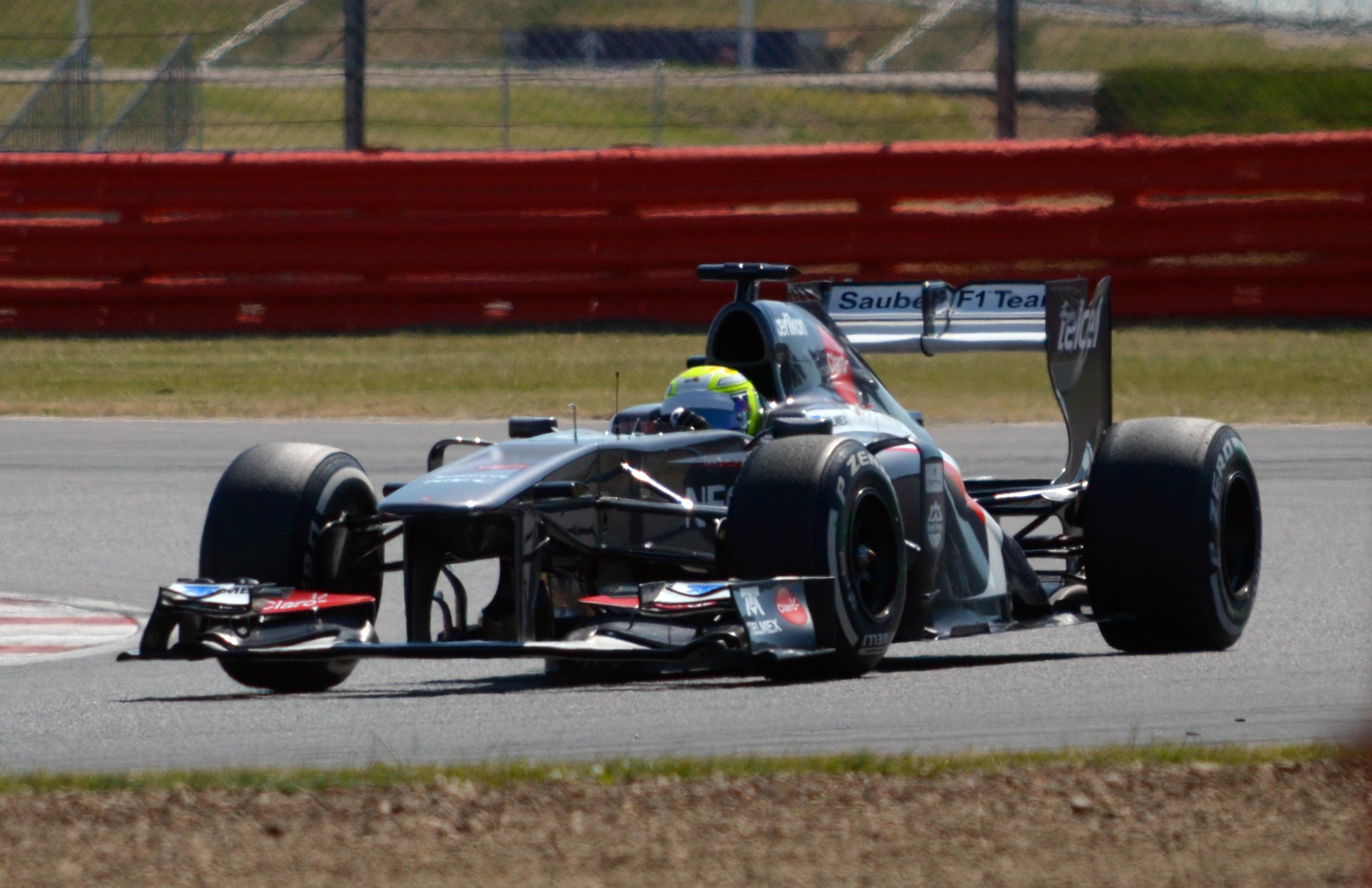
Sato testing for Sauber in 2013.

Kimiya Sato (佐藤 公哉, Satō Kimiya; born 5 October 1989 in Japan, Kobe) is a Japanese racing driver. He currently competes in Super GT.

== Career ==
After competing in karting in Asia, Sato spent two seasons in Formula BMW UK, ending fourth in 2007. He returned to Japan and resulted runner-up in the 2008 Formula Challenge Japan, then second and fourth in the 2009 and 2010 National Class of the All-Japan Formula Three Championship.

Back in Europe, Sato was tenth in the 2011 Formula 3 Euro Series and third in the 2012 German Formula Three. He climbed to Auto GP in 2013, where he ended second in the championship. Also in 2013, he drove for Sauber at the Formula One Young Driver Test, finishing 13th fastest on day 3 of the test. Sato was the 25th fastest of 31 drivers overall.

For the 2014 season, Sato entered the GP2 Series with Campos Racing.

== Racing record ==
=== Career summary ===
Season	Series	Team	Races	Wins	Poles	F/Laps	Podiums	Points	Position
2006	Formula BMW UK	Rowan Motorsport	20	0	0	0	0	39	10th
2007	Formula BMW UK	Nexa Racing	18	1	1	1	1	510	4th
2007	Formula BMW World Final	Team Loctite	1	0	0	0	0	N/A	13th
2008	Formula Challenge Japan	NDDP	16	1	1	3	8	171	**2nd**
2008	Formula BMW Pacific	Eurasia Motorsport	1	0	0	0	1	N/A	NC†
2009	All-Japan Formula 3 Championship - National Class	Team Nova	16	3	2	2	10	89	**2nd**
2010	All-Japan Formula 3 Championship - National Class	Team Nova	16	1	0	1	5	43	4th
2010	Macau Grand Prix	Motopark Academy	1	0	0	0	0	N/A	24th
2011	Formula 3 Euro Series	Motopark Academy	27	1	0	0	2	86	10th
2011	FIA Formula 3 International Trophy	Motopark Academy	6	0	0	0	0	7	9th
2011	Macau Grand Prix	Motopark Academy	1	0	0	0	0	N/A	12th
2011	Masters of Formula 3	Motopark Academy	1	0	0	0	0	N/A	12th
2012	German Formula 3 Championship	Lotus	27	4	3	7	12	86	**3rd**
2013	Auto GP	Euronova Racing	16	5	0	5	9	213	**2nd**
2013	Formula One	Sauber F1 Team	Test driver						
2014	GP2 Series	Campos Racing	20	0	0	0	0	2	27th
2014	Auto GP	Euronova Racing	12	6	1	7	10	221	**1st**
2015	Super GT - GT300	JLOC	6	0	0	0	0	4	22nd
2016	Super GT - GT300	JLOC	8	0	0	0	0	6	19th
2017	Super GT - GT300	JLOC	8	0	0	0	1	21	14th
2018	Super GT - GT300	JLOC	8	0	0	0	1	29	11th
2018	Super Taikyu - ST-X	MAX Racing	5	0	0	0	0	56‡	6th‡
2019	Super GT - GT300	Tsuchiya Engineering	8	0	3	1	0	17	19th
2019	Super Taikyu - ST-X	MAX Racing	5	0	1	0	2	67.5‡	4th‡
2019	Super Taikyu - ST-4	TOM'S Spirit	1	1	1	0	1	123.5‡	**2nd‡**
2020	Super GT - GT300	Hoppy Team Tsuchiya	8	0	0	0	0	10	20th
2020	Super Taikyu - ST-3	Max Racing	1	0	0	0	0	72.5‡	4th‡
2021	Super GT - GT300	Hoppy Team Tsuchiya	8	0	0	0	0	21	14th
2021	Super Taikyu - ST-Z	C.S.I Racing	5	1	4	0	2	73.5‡	5th‡
2021	Super Taikyu - ST-3	Max Racing	1	0	0	0	0	104‡	**2nd‡**
2022	Super GT - GT300	Max Racing	7	0	0	0	0	1	35th
2022	Super Taikyu - ST-3	FKS Team Fukushima	1	0	0	0	0	76‡	4th‡
2022	Super Taikyu - ST-3	Team ZeroOne	2	0	0	0	1	49‡	5th‡
2023	Super GT - GT300	Max Racing	4	0	0	0	1	11	19th
2023	Super Taikyu - ST-3	Team ZeroOne	5	1	1	0	1	86‡	5th‡
2024	Super Taikyu - ST-Z	Team ZeroOne							
2024	Super GT - GT300	Hoppy Team Tsuchiya	6	0	0	0	0	0	NC
2025	Super GT - GT300	Hoppy Team Tsuchiya	8	0	0	0	0	2	31st
2025	Super Taikyu - ST-Z	Team ZeroOne							
2026	Super Taikyu - ST-Z	Aoyama Gakuin Automobile Club							
2026	GT World Challenge Asia	Team 5ZIGEN	2	0	0	0	0	1	39th
2026	Super GT - GT300	Team Mach	1	0	0	0	0	0	NC

† – As Sato was a guest driver, he was ineligible for points. ‡ Team standings.

=== Complete Formula 3 Euro Series results ===
(key)

Year	Entrant	Chassis	Engine	1	2	3	4	5	6	7	8	9	10	11	12	13	14	15	16	17	18	19	20	21	22	23	24	25	26	27	DC	Points
2011	Motopark Academy	Dallara F308/098	Volkswagen	LEC; 1 Ret	LEC; 2; 6	LEC; 3; 8	HOC; 1 Ret	HOC; 2; 12	HOC; 3; 10	ZAN; 1; 7	ZAN; 2; 1	ZAN; 3; 10	RBR; 1; 11	RBR; 2; 4	RBR; 3; 10	NOR; 1; 6	NOR; 2 Ret	NOR; 3; 8	NÜR; 1; 8	NÜR; 2; 5	NÜR; 3; 12	SIL; 1; 8	SIL; 2; 4	SIL; 3 DSQ	VAL; 1; 8	VAL; 2; 2	VAL; 3; 9	HOC; 1 Ret	HOC; 2; 7	HOC; 3; 9	10th	86

=== Complete Auto GP results ===
(key) (Races in bold indicate pole position) (Races in italics indicate fastest lap)

Year	Entrant	1	2	3	4	5	6	7	8	9	10	11	12	13	14	15	16	Pos	Points
2013	Euronova Racing	MNZ; 1; 2	MNZ; 2; 1	MAR; 1; 3	MAR; 2; 3	HUN; 1; 1	HUN; 2; 6	SIL; 1; 6	SIL; 2; 1	MUG; 1 Ret	MUG; 2; 3	NÜR; 1; 4	NÜR; 2; 1	DON; 1; 14†	DON; 2; 5	BRN; 2; 4	BRN; 2; 1	2nd	213
2014	Euronova Racing	MAR; 1; 1	MAR; 2; 2	LEC; 1; 3	LEC; 2; 3	HUN; 1; 1	HUN; 2; 1	MNZ; 1	MNZ; 2	IMO; 1; 1	IMO; 2; 4	**RBR**; **1**; 1	RBR; 2; 8†	NÜR; 1; 1	NÜR; 2; 3	EST; 1	EST; 2	1st	221

^{†} Driver did not finish the race, but was classified as he completed over 90% of the race distance.

=== Complete GP2 Series results ===
(key) (Races in bold indicate pole position) (Races in italics indicate fastest lap)

Year	Entrant	1	2	3	4	5	6	7	8	9	10	11	12	13	14	15	16	17	18	19	20	21	22	DC	Points
2014	Campos Racing	BHR; FEA; Ret	BHR; SPR; 19	CAT; FEA; 19	CAT; SPR; 15	MON; FEA; 15	MON; SPR; 14	RBR; FEA; Ret	RBR; SPR; 19	SIL; FEA; 23	SIL; SPR; 20	HOC; FEA	HOC; SPR	HUN; FEA; Ret	HUN; SPR; Ret	SPA; FEA; 17	SPA; SPR; 18	MNZ; FEA; Ret	MNZ; SPR; 12	SOC; FEA; 13	SOC; SPR; 7	YMC; FEA; 14	YMC; SPR; 22	27th	2

=== Complete Super GT results ===
(key) (Races in bold indicate pole position) (Races in italics indicate fastest lap)

Year	Team	Car	Class	1	2	3	4	5	6	7	8	9	DC	Points
2015	JLOC	Lamborghini Gallardo GT3	GT300	OKA	FUJ; Ret	CHA; 17	FUJ; 7	SUZ; 4†	SUG; 18	AUT	MOT; 16		22nd	4
2016	JLOC	Lamborghini Huracan GT3	GT300	OKA; 13	FUJ; 8	SUG; 22	FUJ; 19	SUZ; 17	CHA; 21	MOT; 8	MOT; 11		19th	6
2017	JLOC	Lamborghini Huracan GT3	GT300	OKA; 11	FUJ; 4	AUT; 18	SUG; 19	FUJ; 12	SUZ; 3	CHA; 12	MOT; 11		14th	21
2018	JLOC	Lamborghini Huracan GT3	GT300	OKA; 12	FUJ; 16	SUZ; 12	CHA; 5	FUJ; Ret	SUG; 13	AUT; 2	MOT; 4		11th	29
2019	Tsuchiya Engineering	Toyota 86 MC	GT300	OKA; Ret	FUJ; 18	**SUZ**; 5	**CHA**; 4	FUJ; 26	**AUT**; 16	SUG; 27	MOT; 18		19th	17
2020	Hoppy Team Tsuchiya	Porsche 911 GT3 R	GT300	FUJ; 19	FUJ; 20	SUZ; 14	MOT; 8	FUJ; 11	SUZ; 9	MOT; 6	FUJ; 14		20th	10
2021	Hoppy Team Tsuchiya	Porsche 911 GT3 R	GT300	OKA; 7	FUJ; 13	MOT; 6	SUZ; 23	SUG; 19	AUT; 10	MOT; 5	FUJ; 6		14th	21
2022	Max Racing	Toyota GR Supra GT300	GT300	OKA	FUJ; 19	SUZ; 22	FUJ; Ret	SUZ; Ret	SUG; 14	AUT; 10	MOT; 17		35th	1
2023	Max Racing	Toyota GR Supra GT300	GT300	OKA; 3	FUJ; 16	SUZ; 16	FUJ; Ret	SUZ	SUG	AUT	MOT		19th	11
2024	Hoppy Team Tsuchiya	Toyota GR Supra GT300	GT300	OKA	FUJ; 23	SUZ; 18	FUJ; Ret	SUG; Ret	AUT; 11	MOT	SUZ; 15		27th	0
2025	Hoppy Team Tsuchiya	Toyota GR Supra GT300	GT300	OKA; 15	FUJ; 22	SEP	FS1; 25	FS2 (23)	SUZ; 20	SUG; 20	AUT; 15	MOT; DNS	31st	2
2026	Team Mach	Toyota 86 MC GT300	GT300	OKA	FUJ	FUJ	SUZ	SUG; 26	AUT	MOT	MOT		NC	0

^{†} Sato was ineligible for points at the Suzuka round. ^{(Number)} Driver did not take part in this sprint race, points are still awarded for the teammate's result.

Sporting positions
Preceded by Vittorio Ghirelli	Auto GP; Drivers' Champion; 2014	Succeeded by Luis Michael Dörrbecker (2016)
