= Motegi, Tochigi =

Motegi 茂木町
- Town
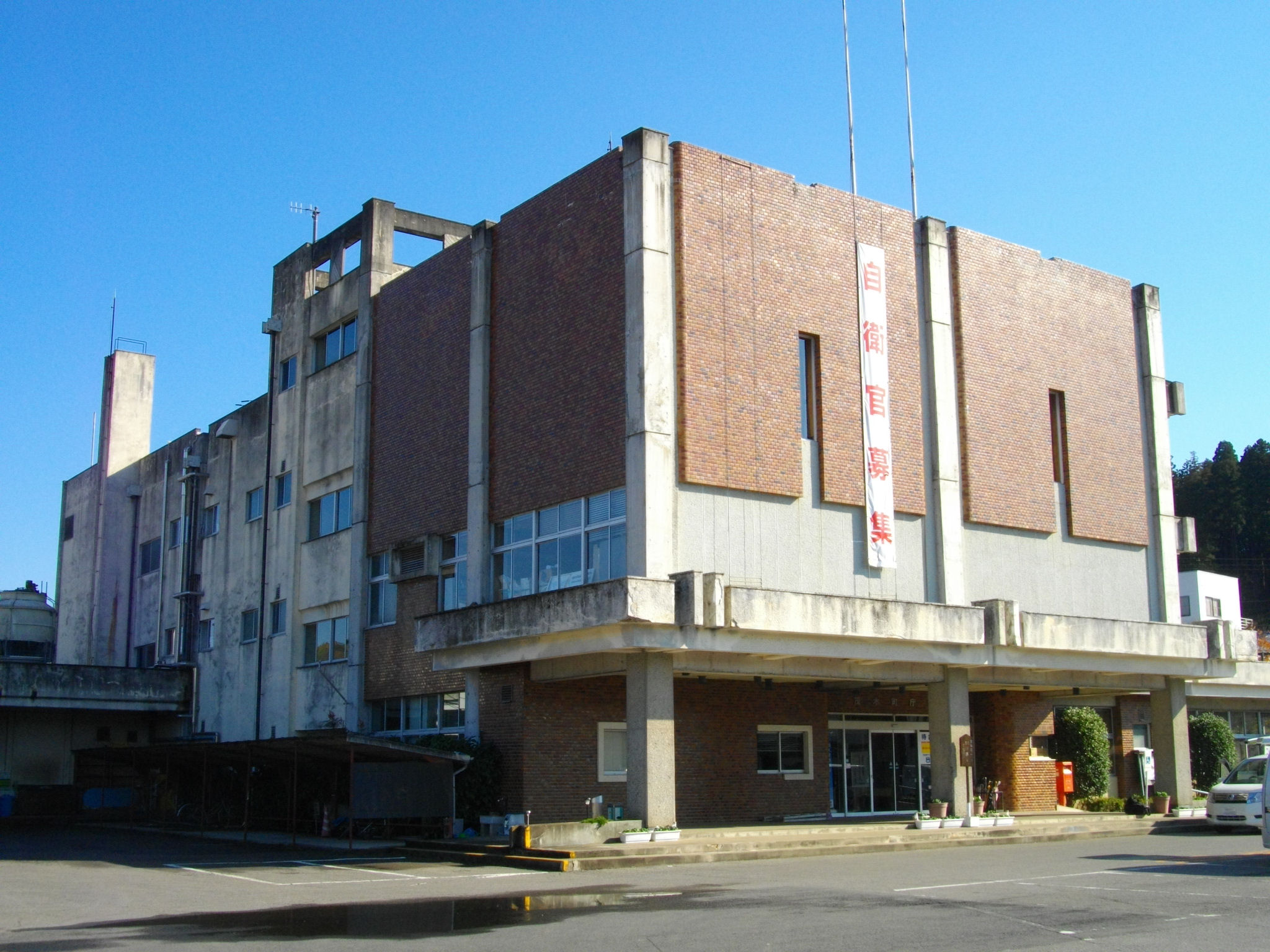
- Motegi Town Office

- Flag Seal

- Location of Motegi in Tochigi Prefecture

- Coordinates: 36°31′55.6″N 140°11′15.2″E
- Country: Japan
- Region: Kantō
- Prefecture: Tochigi
- District: Haga

Area
  - Total: 172.69 km^{2} (66.68 sq mi)

Population (August 2020)
  - Total: 11,777
  - Density: 68.197/km^{2} (176.63/sq mi)
- Time zone: UTC+9 (Japan Standard Time)
- Tree: Zelkova serrata
- Flower: Kikyo
- Bird: Japanese bush warbler
- Phone number: 0285-63-1111
- Address: Ōaza Motegi 155, Motegi-machi, Haga -gun, Tochigi-ken 321-3598
- Website: Official website

Motegi (茂木町, Motegi-machi) is a town located in Tochigi Prefecture, Japan. As of 1 August 2020, the town had an estimated population of 11,777 in 4503 households, and a population density of 68 persons per km^{2}. The total area of the town is 172.69 square kilometres (66.68 sq mi).

== Geography ==
Motegi is located on the far eastern border of Tochigi Prefecture.

=== Surrounding municipalities ===
Ibaraki Prefecture

- Hitachiōmiya
- Kasama
- Sakuragawa
- Shirosato

Tochigi Prefecture

- Ichikai
- Mashiko
- Nasukarasuyama

=== Climate ===
Motegi has a humid subtropical climate (Köppen Cfa) characterized by warm summers and cold winters with heavy snowfall. The average annual temperature in Motegi is 13.1 °C. The average annual rainfall is 1410 mm with September as the wettest month. The temperatures are highest on average in August, at around 25.1 °C, and lowest in January, at around 2.0 °C.

== Demographics ==
Per Japanese census data, the population of Motegi peaked in the 1950s and has declined steadily over the past 70 years. It is now less than half what it was a century ago.

Historical population
Year	Pop.	±%
1920	23,018	—
1930	23,896	+3.8%
1940	24,696	+3.3%
1950	30,973	+25.4%
1960	26,786	−13.5%
1970	21,978	−17.9%
1980	20,051	−8.8%
1990	18,934	−5.6%
2000	17,466	−7.8%
2010	15,023	−14.0%
2020	11,891	−20.8%

== History ==
The town of Motegi, and the villages of Sakagawa, Nakagawa and Sudo were created within Haga District on April 1, 1889 with the creation of the modern municipalities system. The three villages were annexed by Motegi on August 1, 1954.

== Government ==
Motegi has a mayor-council form of government with a directly elected mayor and a unicameral town council of 14 members. Motegi, together with the other municipalities in Haga District collectively contributes two members to the Tochigi Prefectural Assembly. In terms of national politics, the town is part of Tochigi 4th district of the lower house of the Diet of Japan.

== Education ==
Motegi has four public primary schools and one public middle school operated by the town government. The town has one public high school operated by the Tochigi Prefectural Board of Education.

== Transportation ==
=== Railway ===
- Mooka Railway – Mooka Line
  - Ten'yaba - Motegi

=== Highway ===
- National Route 123
- National Route 294

== Local attractions ==
Motegi is the site of the Mobility Resort Motegi, a complex built by Honda which hosts all types of car and go-cart racing, the Honda Collection Hall transport museum, a resort-style hotel, and the "Hello Woods" camping and nature area.

The Nissan Proving Grounds for testing off-road vehicles are also located in Motegi.
