= Nissan Proving Grounds =

Automobile proving ground in Japan

Coordinates: 36.497963°N 140.191585°E

Nissan Motors operates a proving ground in Motegi, Haga District, Tochigi Prefecture, Japan. The track includes an off-road facility for testing trucks and SUVs. The Motegi test center (茂木試験場) is located at 555 Aida-Ōaza, Haga-gun, Motegi (栃木県茂木町大字鮎田555). The track was built by Tobishima Corporation and completed in 1997.
