= Hoppy (drink) =

Low-alcohol beer-flavored beverage

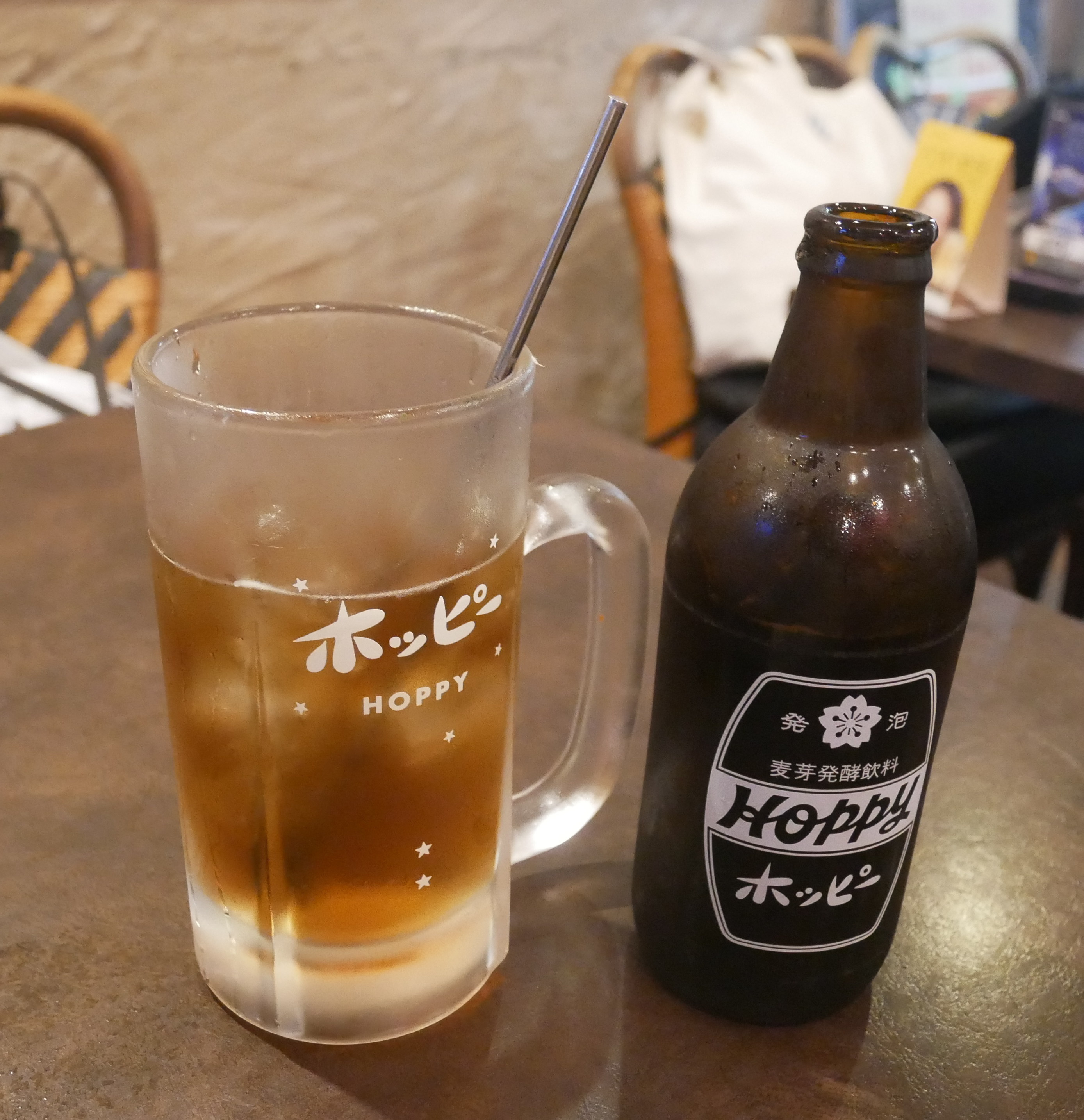
A glass of Hoppy mixed with shōchū

Hoppy (ホッピー, Hoppii) is a beer-flavored almost non-alcoholic drink (0.8% alcohol) that Kokuka Beverage Company began producing and selling in Japan in 1948; it is most available in and associated with Tokyo. Kokuka subsequently changed its name to Hoppy Beverage Co., Ltd. Hoppy is a registered trademark of Hoppy Beverage Co., Ltd.

Despite its beer-like flavor, Hoppy contains no purine bases.

At the time of its launch, Hoppy mixed with shōchū (a Japanese distilled beverage) was considered a substitute for beer, which was beyond the reach of ordinary people. The mixed drink is referred to as Hoppy as well. It is still a staple among some Tokyo residents, and has experienced a retro revival of late. It is a popular item at izakaya (Japanese-style pubs), especially within the suburban old town area along the Keisei Main Line.

== Products ==
- Hoppy (original)
- Black Hoppy (tastes bitter and sweet with aroma)
- 55 Hoppy (memorialized with its 55th birthday)
- Hoppy 330 (bottled in a single-use bottle for home use)
- Hoppy Black (same as Black Hoppy for home use)

== Recommended use ==
Legally speaking, Hoppy is a non-alcoholic drink; however, it does contain about 0.8 percent alcohol. It is often added to shōchū, a Japanese distilled beverage. The company recommends a detailed way of using it as follows:

1. Shōchū should be kōrui shōchū (or shōchū kōrui, 焼酎甲類), which is distilled two or more times, and should contain 25 percent alcohol.
2. Beforehand, the Hoppy and shōchū should be chilled in a refrigerator, and glasses should be chilled in a freezer. The company calls this "sanrei" (三冷, literally "three coolings").
3. Five parts Hoppy should be added to one part shōchū. This will give a resultant drink which has about 5 percent alcohol.
4. The Shōchū should be ready in glasses first, and Hoppy should be added vigorously so that the drink foams up, without stirring, which is not recommended.
5. Ice should not be added, because it detracts from the taste of the drink.

When Hoppy is ordered at a pub, a glass or mug of shōchū is brought along with a bottle of Hoppy. The shochu will be referred to as "naka" (中, lit. "inside"), and the Hoppy will be called "soto" (外, lit. "outside"). If another bottle of Hoppy is needed, the phrase "another 'soto'" is used. It is also possible to order just "naka," in which case a shōchū shot will be served on its own.

Some establishments will place the mug and shōchū in a freezer and allow it to turn into a frozen slush before serving it with Hoppy. The use of ice is sometimes looked down upon, but it is possible to find places that serve Hoppy and shōchū with ice.

== See also ==
- Happoshu
