= 2013 Motegi GT 250km =

Final championship round of the 2013 Super GT season

Layout of the Twin Ring Motegi

The 2013 Motegi GT 250km was the final round of the 2013 Super GT season, the 8th points scoring race for GT500 cars and the 9th for GT300 cars. It took place on November 3, 2013 at Twin Ring Motegi in Motegi, Tochigi, Japan.

== Background ==
Kohei Hirate and Yuji Tachikawa led the championship for Team Cerumo, having scored 58 points. Following their win at the previous race, TOM'S drivers Kazuki Nakajima and James Rossiter were 2nd in the championship, four points behind Cerumo. Eight teams in GT500 had a theoretical chance at winning the championship entering the Motegi round. In GT300 Team Mugen had an eight-point lead over Goodsmile Racing's Tatsuya Kataoka and Nobuteru Taniguchi, while in GT300 only five teams had a possibility of winning the championship. The Balance of Performance was re-adjusted in GT300, the air restrictor sizes for the Honda CR-Z and Subaru BRZ were returned to their sizes that were at the Fuji 300km round.

Because Motegi was the final round of the championship, teams that competed in all rounds of the championship had their weight ballast removed, all cars with the exception of the #5 Team Mach Nissan GT-R GT3 ran without weight ballast. Unlike other rounds which are normally 300km in length, Motegi is only a 250km race. 38 cars entered the final round at Motegi, the #360 Tomei Sports Nissan GT-R GT3 not entering Motegi was the only change from the Autopolis entry list.

== Report ==
=== Practice ===
The #38 Team Cerumo Lexus SC430 was fastest GT500 car in practice while the #100 Team Kunimitsu Honda HSV-010 GT was second fastest. In GT300 The #11 Gainer Mercedes-Benz SLS AMG GT3 set the fastest time from the #16 Team Mugen Honda CR-Z. The #37 TOM'S SC430 caused the first red flag 17 minutes into the session after spinning off at the final turn. A second red flag came out 40 minutes in after the car that was fastest at the end of the session, #38 Team Cerumo SC430 spun off at turn 2. The #19 Bandoh SC430 also had a problem and stopped on circuit with 20 minutes remaining.

=== Qualifying ===
Qualifying was held on November 2, 2013. In the first session for all GT300 cars the championship leader, the Team Mugen Honda CR-Z with Yuhki Nakayama was fastest from the #11 Gainer SLS. The session was red flagged as Takashi Kobayashi spun off at the hairpin and was unable to rejoin the circuit, and would have to start the race from the rear of the grid. The only championship-contending team eliminated in Q1 for GT300 was the #52 SLS with Hironori Takeuchi driving. In the first GT500 session Masataka Yanagida was fastest for NISMO, 2nd went to Takashi Kogure. Both Frédéric Makowiecki and James Rossiter, driving for teams that entered Motegi 3rd and 4th in the championship respectively failed to make the cutoff for the second session.

In the second GT300 session Kota Sasaki was fastest in the #61 Subaru BRZ, scoring the team's 5th pole position of the season and Sasaki's 10th in his career. Three of the 4 championship contending teams started in the top three, the GSR Hatsune Miku BMW that was 2nd in the championship would start 7th. Kazuya Oshima was fastest in the second GT500 qualifying session, setting a time a tenth faster than Koudai Tsukakoshi. The championship leading team would start 4th.

=== Race ===
The race was held on November 3, 2013. Oshima started the #6 SC430 from pole position and kept his lead while Tetsuya Yamano was able to lead from the start in GT300, but on lap 4, Björn Wirdheim had overtaken Yamano for the lead, Wirdheim in the #11 Gainer SLS being able to lap much faster than anyone else in the class. On lap 4 in GT500 Kohei Hirate in the #38 SC430 passed Toshihiro Kaneishi in the #17 HSV-010 for 2nd and was then under attack from multiple cars behind. Oshima and Wirdheim kept extending their leads in their respective classes throughout the first stint, Oshima building nearly 20 seconds over Hirate and Wirdheim had nearly 40 seconds on 2nd.

The first pitstops occurred as early as lap 19, Kaneishi in the #17 being the first of the lead group to pit with Tsugio Matsuda, Juichi Wakisaka and Naoki Yamamoto pitting as well. Cerumo pitted a lap after and Yuji Tachikawa managed to keep his position over the #17, now with Koudai Tsukakoshi driving. On lap 32 Hiroaki Ishiura passed Tsukakoshi for 3rd, but 3 laps later Tsukakoshi re-passed Ishiura and began closing on Tachikawa again. Andre Couto and Ralph Firman made contact on lap 38, sending Firman into the wall and Couto receiving a drive-through penalty for the incident. Tsukakoshi overtook Tachikawa for 2nd on lap 38 but Tachikawa still held a 2-point lead in the championship and with other Lexus SC430's behind there was no change in position for the rest of the race, giving Team Cerumo, Tachikawa and Hirate the championship. Yuji Kunimoto won his first GT500 race for Team LeMans and Oshima won his 3rd GT500 race.

Kota Sasaki was catching Yuhki Nakayama for 2nd in GT300 in the closing laps but with two laps to go Sasaki spun, which assured Nakayama would finish 2nd, which was enough for Team Mugen to win the GT300 championship by five points over the race winners of Katsuyuki Hiranaka and Björn Wirdheim, who were well ahead of anyone else in their class.

== Results ==
=== Qualifying ===
Pos	No	Team	Q1 Driver	Q2 Driver	Qualifying 1	Qualifying 2	Tyre
GT500
1	6	Lexus Team LeMans ENEOS	(Japan) Yuji Kunimoto	(Japan) Kazuya Oshima	1:42.117	1:41.367	B
2	17	Keihin Real Racing	(Japan) Toshihiro Kaneishi	(Japan) Koudai Tsukakoshi	1:42.292	1:41.490	B
3	23	Motul Autech NISMO	(Japan) Masataka Yanagida	(Italy) Ronnie Quintarelli	1:41.821	1:41.514	MI
4	38	Lexus Team Zent Cerumo	(Japan) Kohei Hirate	(Japan) Yuji Tachikawa	1:42.022	1:41.582	B
5	39	Lexus Team DENSO SARD	(Japan) Juichi Wakisaka	(Japan) Hiroaki Ishiura	1:42.062	1:41.598	B
6	100	Raybrig Team Kunimitsu	(Japan) Takashi Kogure	(Japan) Takuya Izawa	1:41.996	1:42.144	B
7	37	Lexus Team KeePer TOM'S	(Japan) Daisuke Ito	(Italy) Andrea Caldarelli	1:42.305	1:42.323	B
8	12	Calsonic Team Impul	(Brazil) João Paulo de Oliveira	(Japan) Tsugio Matsuda	1:42.208	1:42.374	B
9	1	S-Road REITO MOLA	(Japan) Yuhi Sekiguchi	(Japan) Satoshi Motoyama	1:42.364		MI
10	18	Weider Dome Racing	(France) Frédéric Makowiecki	(Japan) Naoki Yamamoto	1:42.399		MI
11	24	D'Station ADVAN Kondo Racing	(Japan) Hironobu Yasuda	(Germany) Michael Krumm	1:42.463		Y
12	19	Lexus Team WedsSport Bandoh	(Portugal) Andre Couto	(Japan) Seiji Ara	1:42.558		Y
13	36	Lexus Team Petronas TOM'S	(United Kingdom) James Rossiter	(Japan) Kazuki Nakajima	1:42.564		B
14	8	Autobacs Racing Team Aguri	(Republic of Ireland) Ralph Firman	(Japan) Kosuke Matsuura	1:42.679		B
15	32	Epson Nakajima Racing	(Japan) Daisuke Nakajima	(Japan) Ryo Michigami	1:43.547		D
GT300
1	61	R&D Sport	(Japan) Tetsuya Yamano	(Japan) Kota Sasaki	1:49.156	1:48.264	MI
2	11	Gainer	(Sweden) Björn Wirdheim	(Japan) Katsuyuki Hiranaka	1:49.090	1:48.354	D
3	16	Team Mugen	(Japan) Yuhki Nakayama	(Japan) Hideki Mutoh	1:48.636	1:48.389	B
4	3	NDDP Racing	(Japan) Kazuki Hoshino	(Japan) Daiki Sasaki	1:49.377	1:48.900	Y
5	62	Leon Racing	(Japan) Tsubasa Kurosawa	(Japan) Haruki Kurosawa	1:49.813	1:48.970	Y
6	88	JLOC	(Japan) Manabu Orido	(Japan) Takayuki Aoki	1:49.621	1:49.241	Y
7	4	GSR Hatsune Miku	(Japan) Tatsuya Kataoka	(Japan) Nobuteru Taniguchi	1:49.717	1:49.518	Y
8	87	JLOC	(Japan) Hiroki Yoshimoto	(Japan) Hideki Yamauchi	1:49.641	1:49.551	Y
9	33	Hankook KTR	(Japan) Tomonobu Fujii	(Japan) Masami Kageyama	1:49.826	1:49.600	HK
10	0	Team Taisan Ken Endless	(Japan) Naoki Yokomizo	(Japan) Kyosuke Mineo	1:49.702	1:49.789	Y
11	10	Gainer	(Japan) Tetsuya Tanaka	(Japan) Masayuki Ueda	1:49.215	1:50.240	D
12	2	Cars Tokai Dream28	(Japan) Hiroki Katoh	(Japan) Kazuho Takahashi	1:49.893	1:52.238	Y
13	48	Dijon Racing	(Japan) Katsumasa Chiyo	(Japan) Hiroshi Takamori	1:49.530	1:52.276	Y
14	31	apr	(Japan) Morio Nitta	(Japan) Koki Saga	1:50.063		Y
15	21	Hitotsuyama Racing	(United Kingdom) Richard Lyons	(Japan) Akihiro Tsuzuki	1:50.162		HK
16	30	apr	(Japan) Yuki Iwasaki	(United States) Igor Sushko	1:50.420		Y
17	50	Arnage Racing	(Japan) Hideto Yasuoka	(Japan) Masaki Kano	1:50.440		Y
18	86	JLOC	(Japan) Shinya Hosokawa	(Japan) Koji Yamanishi	1:50.446		Y
19	22	R'Qs MotorSports	(Japan) Hisashi Wada	(Japan) Masaki Jyonai	1:50.544		Y
20	52	OKINAWA-IMP RACING with SHIFT	(Japan) Hironori Takeuchi	(Japan) Takeshi Tsuchiya	1:50.632		Y
21	5	Team Mach	(Japan) Tetsuji Tamanaka	(Japan) Junichiro Yamashita	1:51.337		Y
22	9	Pacific Direction Racing	(Japan) Shogo Mitsuyama	(Japan) You Yokomaku	1:51.707		Y
23	55	Autobacs Racing Team Aguri	(Japan) Takashi Kobayashi	(Japan) Shinichi Takagi	No Time		B

=== Race ===
Race result is as follows.

Pos	No	Team	Drivers	Chassis	Tyre	Time/Difference	Laps
GT500
1	6	Lexus Team LeMans ENEOS	(Japan) Yuji Kunimoto (Japan) Kazuya Oshima	Lexus SC430	B	1:35:34.873	53
2	17	Keihin Real Racing	(Japan) Toshihiro Kaneishi (Japan) Koudai Tsukakoshi	Honda HSV-010 GT	B	+11.640	53
3	38	Lexus Team Zent Cerumo	(Japan) Kohei Hirate (Japan) Yuji Tachikawa	Lexus SC430	B	+32.220	53
4	39	Lexus Team DENSO SARD	(Japan) Hiroaki Ishiura (Japan) Juichi Wakisaka	Lexus SC430	B	+33.293	53
5	36	Lexus Team Petronas TOM'S	(Japan) Kazuki Nakajima (United Kingdom) James Rossiter	Lexus SC430	B	+33.405	53
6	37	Lexus Team KeePer TOM'S	(Italy) Andrea Caldarelli (Japan) Daisuke Ito	Lexus SC430	B	+43.352	53
7	18	Weider Dome Racing	(France) Frédéric Makowiecki (Japan) Naoki Yamamoto	Honda HSV-010 GT	MI	+43.980	53
8	23	Motul Autech NISMO	(Italy) Ronnie Quintarelli (Japan) Masataka Yanagida	Nissan GT-R	MI	+46.982	53
9	24	D'Station ADVAN Kondo Racing	(Germany) Michael Krumm (Japan) Hironobu Yasuda	Nissan GT-R	Y	+47.690	53
10	19	Lexus Team WedsSport Bandoh	(Japan) Seiji Ara (Portugal) Andre Couto	Lexus SC430	Y	+57.947	53
11	32	Epson Nakajima Racing	(Japan) Ryo Michigami (Japan) Daisuke Nakajima	Honda HSV-010 GT	D	+1:03.938	53
12	100	Raybrig Team Kunimitsu	(Japan) Takuya Izawa (Japan) Takashi Kogure	Honda HSV-010 GT	B	+1:05.040	53
13	12	Calsonic Team Impul	(Brazil) João Paulo de Oliveira (Japan) Tsugio Matsuda	Nissan GT-R	B	+1 Lap	52
14	1	S-Road REITO MOLA	(Japan) Satoshi Motoyama (Japan) Yuhi Sekiguchi	Nissan GT-R	MI	+6 Laps	47
15	8	Autobacs Racing Team Aguri	(Republic of Ireland) Ralph Firman (Japan) Kosuke Matsuura	Honda HSV-010 GT	B	+15 Laps	38
GT300
1	11	Gainer	(Japan) Katsuyuki Hiranaka (Sweden) Björn Wirdheim	Mercedes-Benz SLS AMG GT3	D	1:36:39.089	51
2	16	Team Mugen	(Japan) Hideki Mutoh (Japan) Yuhki Nakayama	Honda CR-Z	B	+1 Lap	50
3	61	R&D Sport	(Japan) Kota Sasaki (Japan) Tetsuya Yamano	Subaru BRZ	MI	+1 Lap	50
4	4	GSR Hatsune Miku	(Japan) Tatsuya Kataoka (Japan) Nobuteru Taniguchi	BMW Z4 GT3	Y	+1 Lap	50
5	88	JLOC	(Japan) Takayuki Aoki (Japan) Manabu Orido	Lamborghini Gallardo GT3	Y	+1 Lap	50
6	62	Leon Racing	(Japan) Haruki Kurosawa (Japan) Tsubasa Kurosawa	Mercedes-Benz SLS AMG GT3	Y	+1 Lap	50
7	52	OKINAWA-IMP RACING with SHIFT	(Japan) Hironori Takeuchi (Japan) Takeshi Tsuchiya	Mercedes-Benz SLS AMG GT3	Y	+1 Lap	50
8	87	JLOC	(Japan) Hideki Yamauchi (Japan) Hiroki Yoshimoto	Lamborghini Gallardo GT3	Y	+1 Lap	50
9	3	NDDP Racing	(Japan) Kazuki Hoshino (Japan) Daiki Sasaki	Nissan GT-R GT3	Y	+1 Lap	50
10	0	Team Taisan Ken Endless	(Japan) Kyosuke Mineo (Japan) Naoki Yokomizo	Porsche 997 GT3	Y	+1 Lap	50
11	33	Hankook KTR	(Japan) Tomonobu Fujii (Japan) Masami Kageyama	Porsche 911 GT3-R	HK	+1 Lap	50
12	10	Gainer	(Japan) Tetsuya Tanaka (Japan) Masayuki Ueda	Mercedes-Benz SLS AMG GT3	D	+1 Lap	50
13	86	JLOC	(Japan) Shinya Hosokawa (Japan) Koji Yamanishi	Lamborghini Gallardo GT3	Y	+1 Lap	50
14	30	apr	(Japan) Yuki Iwasaki (United States) Igor Sushko	Nissan GT-R GT3	Y	+1 Lap	50
15	55	Autobacs Racing Team Aguri	(Japan) Takashi Kobayashi (Japan) Shinichi Takagi	Honda CR-Z	B	+1 Lap	50
16	22	R'Qs MotorSports	(Japan) Masaki Jyonai (Japan) Hisashi Wada	Mercedes-Benz SLS AMG GT3	Y	+1 Lap	50
17	2	Cars Tokai Dream28	(Japan) Hiroki Katoh (Japan) Kazuho Takahashi	McLaren MP4-12C GT3	Y	+1 Lap	50
18	48	Dijon Racing	(Japan) Katsumasa Chiyo (Japan) Hiroshi Takamori	Nissan GT-R GT3	Y	+1 Lap	50
19	9	Pacific Direction Racing	(Japan) Shogo Mitsuyama (Japan) You Yokomaku	Porsche 911 GT3-R	Y	+1 Lap	50
20	31	apr	(Japan) Morio Nitta (Japan) Koki Saga	Toyota Prius	Y	+2 Laps	49
21	21	Hitotsuyama Racing	(United Kingdom) Richard Lyons (Japan) Akihiro Tsuzuki	Audi R8 LMS ultra	HK	+3 Laps	48
22	5	Team Mach	(Japan) Tetsuji Tamanaka (Japan) Junichiro Yamashita	Nissan GT-R GT3	Y	+3 Laps	48
Ret	50	Arnage Racing	(Japan) Masaki Kano (Japan) Hideto Yasuoka	Aston Martin V12 Vantage GT3	Y	+45 Laps	6

- GT500 Fastest Lap – Kazuya Oshima, #6 Lexus Team LeMans ENEOS Lexus SC430 – 1:44.056
- GT300 Fastest Lap – Kota Sasaki, #61 R&D Sport Subaru BRZ – 1:50.728

== Point rankings after the event ==
GT500 Driver Point rankings

Rank	Driver	Points
1	(Japan) Kohei Hirate (Japan) Yuji Tachikawa	69
2	(Japan) Toshihiro Kaneishi (Japan) Koudai Tsukakoshi	67
3	(Japan) Kazuki Nakajima (United Kingdom) James Rossiter	60
4	(France) Frédéric Makowiecki (Japan) Naoki Yamamoto	56
5	(Japan) Yuji Kunimoto (Japan) Kazuya Oshima	52

GT300 Driver Point rankings

Rank	Driver	Points
1	(Japan) Hideki Mutoh (Japan) Yuhki Nakayama	85
2	(Japan) Katsuyuki Hiranaka (Sweden) Björn Wirdheim	80
3	(Japan) Tatsuya Kataoka (Japan) Nobuteru Taniguchi	70
4	(Japan) Kota Sasaki (Japan) Tetsuya Yamano	66
5	(Japan) Hironori Takeuchi (Japan) Takeshi Tsuchiya	60

- Note: Only the top five positions are included for both GT500 and GT300 classes.

Super GT
Previous race: Autopolis GT 300km	2013 season	Next race: Fuji Sprint Cup (Non-championship race)
