= 2013 JAF Grand Prix =

Racing event

Track map of the Fuji Speedway

The 2013 JAF Grand Prix Fuji Sprint Cup was the final racing event for both the 2013 Super GT season and the 2013 Super Formula season. It took place over November 23 and November 24, 2013 at the Fuji Speedway in Oyama, Shizuoka, Japan.

== Background ==
The JAF Grand Prix would be the last time the current model GT500 and the current model Super Formula cars would race, as Super GT would move to unified regulations with the Deutsche Tourenwagen Masters, while the Swift SF13 would be replaced by the Dallara SF14 for the 2014 Super Formula season.

The Balance of Performance in GT300 was once again adjusted, the GTA decided to adopt the balance of performance for GT3 cars from the Blancpain Endurance Series.

Unlike the eight points-scoring races in Super GT, the Fuji Sprint Cup was run under slightly different rules.

- The GT500 and GT300 classes were split into their own set of two races.
- Each driver in GT500 and GT300 would have their own 22 lap (100 km) sprint race without any mandatory pitstop.
- Standing starts were also implemented for each of the four races instead of the rolling start normally seen.
- There would be no weight ballast for any of the cars in either class.

38 cars were entered in the two Super GT classes, 15 in GT500 and 23 in GT300. The #96 Dijon Racing Callaway Corvette Z06.R GT3 returning to the series after having last raced in the 2013 Fuji GT 300km, while the #35 Nismo Global Athlete Team made its only appearance of the season, with Alex Buncombe and Lucas Ordóñez driving. Neither the #52 OKINAWA-IMP RACING with SHIFT Mercedes-Benz SLS AMG GT3 or the #87 JLOC Lamborghini Gallardo GT3 were entered for the JAF Grand Prix, however JLOC put Hideki Yamauchi and Hiroki Yoshimoto, the drivers of the #87 car into their #88 car.

In Super Formula with the exception of André Lotterer and Loïc Duval returning to the cars they had driven for part of the season, there were no other driver changes.

== GT300 Race 1 results ==
The first GT300 race was held on November 23, 2013. Race result is as follows.

Pos	No	Team	Driver	Chassis	Tyre	Time/Difference	Laps
1	3	NDDP Racing	(Japan) Daiki Sasaki	Nissan GT-R GT3	Y	36:38.256	22
2	11	Gainer	(Sweden) Björn Wirdheim	Mercedes-Benz SLS AMG GT3	D	+1.200	22
3	55	Autobacs Racing Team Aguri	(Japan) Takashi Kobayashi	Honda CR-Z	B	+9.302	22
4	48	Dijon Racing	(Japan) Katsumasa Chiyo	Nissan GT-R GT3	Y	+11.301	22
5	62	Leon Racing	(Japan) Haruki Kurosawa	Mercedes-Benz SLS AMG GT3	Y	+19.163	22
6	16	Team Mugen	(Japan) Hideki Mutoh	Honda CR-Z	B	+20.418	22
7	0	Team Taisan Ken Endless	(Japan) Kyosuke Mineo	Porsche 997 GT3	Y	+21.522	22
8	88	JLOC	(Japan) Hideki Yamauchi	Lamborghini Gallardo GT3	Y	+26.037	22
9	22	R'Qs MotorSports	(Japan) Masaki Jyonai	Mercedes-Benz SLS AMG GT3	Y	+26.794	22
10	5	Team Mach	(Japan) Junichiro Yamashita	Nissan GT-R GT3	Y	+35.969	22
11	10	Gainer	(Japan) Masayuki Ueda	Mercedes-Benz SLS AMG GT3	D	+39.908	22
12	31	apr	(Japan) Koki Saga	Toyota Prius	Y	+42.109	22
13	21	Hitotsuyama Racing	(United Kingdom) Richard Lyons	Audi R8 LMS ultra	H	+45.122	22
14	2	Cars Tokai Dream28	(Japan) Kazuho Takahashi	McLaren MP4-12C GT3	Y	+52.081	22
15	86	JLOC	(Japan) Koji Yamanishi	Lamborghini Gallardo GT3	Y	+52.438	22
16	50	Arnage Racing	(Japan) Masaki Kano	Aston Martin V12 Vantage GT3	Y	+54.827	22
17	9	Pacific Direction Racing	(Japan) You Yokomaku	Porsche 911 GT3-R	Y	+1:16.367	22
18	96	Dijon Racing	(Japan) Keiichi Inoue	Callaway Corvette Z06.R GT3	Y	+1 Lap	21
19	35	Nismo Athlete Global Team	(United Kingdom) Alex Buncombe	Nissan GT-R GT3	Y	+2 Laps	20
20	30	apr	(United States) Igor Sushko	Nissan GT-R GT3	Y	+3 Laps	19
Ret	61	R&D Sport	(Japan) Kota Sasaki	Subaru BRZ	M	+9 Laps	13
Ret	4	GSR Hatsune Miku	(Japan) Tatsuya Kataoka	BMW Z4 GT3	Y	+16 Laps	6
Ret	33	Hankook KTR	(Japan) Masami Kageyama	Porsche 911 GT3-R	H	+21 Laps	1

- Fastest Lap – Alex Buncombe, #35 Nismo Athlete Global Team Nissan GT-R GT3 – 1:38.438

== GT500 Race 1 results ==
The first GT500 race was held on November 23, 2013. Race result is as follows.

Pos	No	Team	Driver	Chassis	Tyre	Time/Difference	Laps
1	17	Keihin Real Racing	(Japan) Koudai Tsukakoshi	Honda HSV-010 GT	B	34:37.791	22
2	38	Lexus Team Zent Cerumo	(Japan) Yuji Tachikawa	Lexus SC430	B	+3.285	22
3	100	Raybrig Team Kunimitsu	(Japan) Takashi Kogure	Honda HSV-010 GT	B	+4.439	22
4	18	Weider Dome Racing	(Japan) Naoki Yamamoto	Honda HSV-010 GT	M	+6.223	22
5	36	Lexus Team Petronas TOM'S	(United Kingdom) James Rossiter	Lexus SC430	B	+9.947	22
6	19	Lexus Team WedsSport Bandoh	(Portugal) Andre Couto	Lexus SC430	Y	+11.218	22
7	23	Motul Autech NISMO	(Italy) Ronnie Quintarelli	Nissan GT-R	M	+14.904	22
8	12	Calsonic Team Impul	(Japan) Tsugio Matsuda	Nissan GT-R	B	+15.007	22
9	39	Lexus Team DENSO SARD	(Japan) Juichi Wakisaka	Lexus SC430	B	+16.582	22
10	24	D'Station ADVAN Kondo Racing	(Japan) Hironobu Yasuda	Nissan GT-R	Y	+21.778	22
11	6	Lexus Team LeMans ENEOS	(Japan) Yuji Kunimoto	Lexus SC430	B	+1:16.698	22
12	32	Epson Nakajima Racing	(Japan) Daisuke Nakajima	Honda HSV-010 GT	D	+1:33.909	22
13	8	Autobacs Racing Team Aguri	(Japan) Kosuke Matsuura	Honda HSV-010 GT	B	+4 Laps	18
Ret	1	S-Road REITO MOLA	(Japan) Yuhi Sekiguchi	Nissan GT-R	M	+9 Laps	13
Ret	37	Lexus Team KeePer TOM'S	(Italy) Andrea Caldarelli	Lexus SC430	B	+14 Laps	8

- Fastest Lap – Yuji Kunimoto, #6 Lexus Team LeMans ENEOS Lexus SC430 – 1:32.847

== Super Formula results ==
The Super Formula race was held on November 24, 2013. Race result is as follows.

Pos	No	Team	Driver	Engine	Time/Difference	Laps
1	39	P.mu/cerumo・Inging	(Japan) Yuji Kunimoto	Toyota RV8K	31:27.103	22
2	8	Kygnus Sunoco Team LeMans	(France) Loïc Duval	Toyota RV8K	+1.632	22
3	20	Lenovo Team Impul	(Japan) Tsugio Matsuda	Toyota RV8K	+2.548	22
4	1	Petronas Team TOM'S	(Japan) Kazuki Nakajima	Toyota RV8K	+3.750	22
5	16	Team Mugen	(Japan) Naoki Yamamoto	Honda HR12E	+4.661	22
6	19	Lenovo Team Impul	(Brazil) João Paulo de Oliveira	Toyota RV8K	+5.257	22
7	2	Petronas Team TOM'S	(Germany) André Lotterer	Toyota RV8K	+6.209	22
8	7	Kygnus Sunoco Team LeMans	(Japan) Ryō Hirakawa	Toyota RV8K	+9.293	22
9	38	P.mu/cerumo・Inging	(Japan) Kohei Hirate	Toyota RV8K	+10.307	22
10	10	HP Real Racing	(Japan) Koudai Tsukakoshi	Honda HR12E	+17.589	22
11	3	Kondo Racing	(Japan) Hironobu Yasuda	Toyota RV8K	+24.256	22
12	41	Docomo Team Dandelion Racing	(Japan) Hideki Mutoh	Honda HR12E	+24.764	22
13	11	HP Real Racing	(Japan) Yuhki Nakayama	Honda HR12E	+27.569	22
14	15	Team Mugen	(Japan) Takuma Sato	Honda HR12E	+30.807	22
15	40	Docomo Team Dandelion Racing	(Japan) Takuya Izawa	Honda HR12E	+36.873	22
16	62	Tochigi Le Beausset Motorsports	(Japan) Koki Saga	Toyota RV8K	+37.662	22
17	18	KCMG	(United Kingdom) Richard Bradley	Toyota RV8K	+41.490	22
18	32	Nakajima Racing	(Japan) Takashi Kogure	Honda HR12E	+1 Lap	21
Ret	31	Nakajima Racing	(Japan) Daisuke Nakajima	Honda HR12E	+22 Laps	0

- Fastest Lap – Takuya Izawa, #40 Docomo Team Dandelion Racing – 1:25.043

== GT300 Race 2 results ==
The second GT300 race was held on November 23, 2013. Race result is as follows.

Pos	No	Team	Driver	Chassis	Tyre	Time/Difference	Laps
1	2	Cars Tokai Dream28	(Japan) Hiroki Katoh	McLaren MP4-12C GT3	Y	36:42.791	22
2	11	Gainer	(Japan) Katsuyuki Hiranaka	Mercedes-Benz SLS AMG GT3	D	+0.576	22
3	4	GSR Hatsune Miku	(Japan) Nobuteru Taniguchi	BMW Z4 GT3	Y	+4.053	22
4	55	Autobacs Racing Team Aguri	(Japan) Shinichi Takagi	Honda CR-Z	B	+4.522	22
5	16	Team Mugen	(Japan) Hideki Mutoh	Honda CR-Z	B	+10.500	22
6	10	Gainer	(Japan) Tetsuya Tanaka	Mercedes-Benz SLS AMG GT3	D	+18.933	22
7	3	NDDP Racing	(Japan) Kazuki Hoshino	Nissan GT-R GT3	Y	+19.172	22
8	88	JLOC	(Japan) Hiroki Yoshimoto	Lamborghini Gallardo GT3	Y	+25.357	22
9	33	Hankook KTR	(Japan) Tomonobu Fujii	Porsche 911 GT3-R	H	+27.053	22
10	62	Leon Racing	(Japan) Tsubasa Kurosawa	Mercedes-Benz SLS AMG GT3	Y	+27.397	22
11	30	apr	(Japan) Yuki Iwasaki	Nissan GT-R GT3	Y	+28.107	22
12	50	Arnage Racing	(Japan) Hideto Yasuoka	Aston Martin V12 Vantage GT3	Y	+29.712	22
13	0	Team Taisan Ken Endless	(Japan) Naoki Yokomizo	Porsche 997 GT3	Y	+30.242	22
14	22	R'Qs MotorSports	(Japan) Hisashi Wada	Mercedes-Benz SLS AMG GT3	Y	+31.067	22
15	31	apr	(Japan) Morio Nitta	Toyota Prius	Y	+40.680	22
16	86	JLOC	(Japan) Shinya Hosokawa	Lamborghini Gallardo GT3	Y	+47.873	22
17	9	Pacific Direction Racing	(Japan) Shogo Mitsuyama	Porsche 911 GT3-R	Y	+49.718	22
18	35	Nismo Athlete Global Team	(Spain) Lucas Ordóñez	Nissan GT-R GT3	Y	+50.010	22
19	21	Hitotsuyama Racing	(Japan) Akihiro Tsuzuki	Audi R8 LMS ultra	H	+54.581	22
20	48	Dijon Racing	(Japan) Hiroshi Takamori	Nissan GT-R GT3	Y	+56.431	22
21	96	Dijon Racing	(Japan) Masaki Tanaka	Callaway Corvette Z06.R GT3	Y	+1 Lap	21
22	61	R&D Sport	(Japan) Tetsuya Yamano	Subaru BRZ	M	+2 Laps	20
Ret	5	Team Mach	(Japan) Tetsuji Tamanaka	Nissan GT-R GT3	Y	+16 Laps	6

- Fastest Lap – Kazuki Hoshino, #3 NDDP Racing Nissan GT-R GT3 – 1:38.432

== GT500 Race 2 results ==
The second GT500 race was held on November 23, 2013. Race result is as follows.

Pos	No	Team	Driver	Chassis	Tyre	Time/Difference	Laps
1	6	Lexus Team LeMans ENEOS	(Japan) Kazuya Oshima	Lexus SC430	B	34:31.193	22
2	36	Lexus Team Petronas TOM'S	(Japan) Kazuki Nakajima	Lexus SC430	B	+0.229	22
3	12	Calsonic Team Impul	(Brazil) João Paulo de Oliveira	Nissan GT-R	B	+11.921	22
4	38	Lexus Team Zent Cerumo	(Japan) Kohei Hirate	Lexus SC430	B	+13.093	22
5	100	Raybrig Team Kunimitsu	(Japan) Takuya Izawa	Honda HSV-010 GT	B	+18.078	22
6	17	Keihin Real Racing	(Japan) Toshihiro Kaneishi	Honda HSV-010 GT	B	+19.611	22
7	39	Lexus Team DENSO SARD	(Japan) Hiroaki Ishiura	Lexus SC430	B	+20.137	22
8	18	Weider Dome Racing	(France) Frédéric Makowiecki	Honda HSV-010 GT	M	+30.479	22
9	19	Lexus Team WedsSport Bandoh	(Japan) Seiji Ara	Lexus SC430	Y	+31.473	22
10	24	D'Station ADVAN Kondo Racing	(Germany) Michael Krumm	Nissan GT-R	Y	+32.681	22
11	37	Lexus Team KeePer TOM'S	(Japan) Daisuke Ito	Lexus SC430	B	+38.937	22
12	32	Epson Nakajima Racing	(Japan) Ryo Michigami	Honda HSV-010 GT	D	+42.993	22
13	8	Autobacs Racing Team Aguri	(Republic of Ireland) Ralph Firman	Honda HSV-010 GT	B	+43.116	22
14	23	Motul Autech NISMO	(Japan) Masataka Yanagida	Nissan GT-R	M	+43.634	22
15	1	S-Road REITO MOLA	(Japan) Satoshi Motoyama	Nissan GT-R	M	+1:33.225	22

- Fastest Lap – Kazuya Oshima, #6 Lexus Team LeMans ENEOS Lexus SC430 – 1:32.627

== JAF Grand Prix point rankings ==
Super GT
Previous race: Motegi GT 250km	2013 season	Next race: none
