= 2013 Super GT Series =

21st season of sports car racing series

The 2013 Autobacs Super GT Series was the twenty-first season of the Japan Automobile Federation Super GT Championship including the All Japan Grand Touring Car Championship (JGTC) era, and the ninth season under the name Super GT. It marked the thirty-first season overall of a Japanese professional sportscar championship dating back to the All Japan Sports Prototype Championship. It was the final year of the GT500 regulations introduced in 2010 as the 2014 season would see unified technical regulations with the Deutsche Tourenwagen Masters. The season began on April 7 and ended on November 17, 2013 after 8 regular races and 1 non championship event.

Apart the series' 8 points-scoring races, the 3 Hours of Fuji, a part of 2013 Asian Le Mans Series organized by Automobile Club de l'Ouest, also counted for points towards the GT300 class.

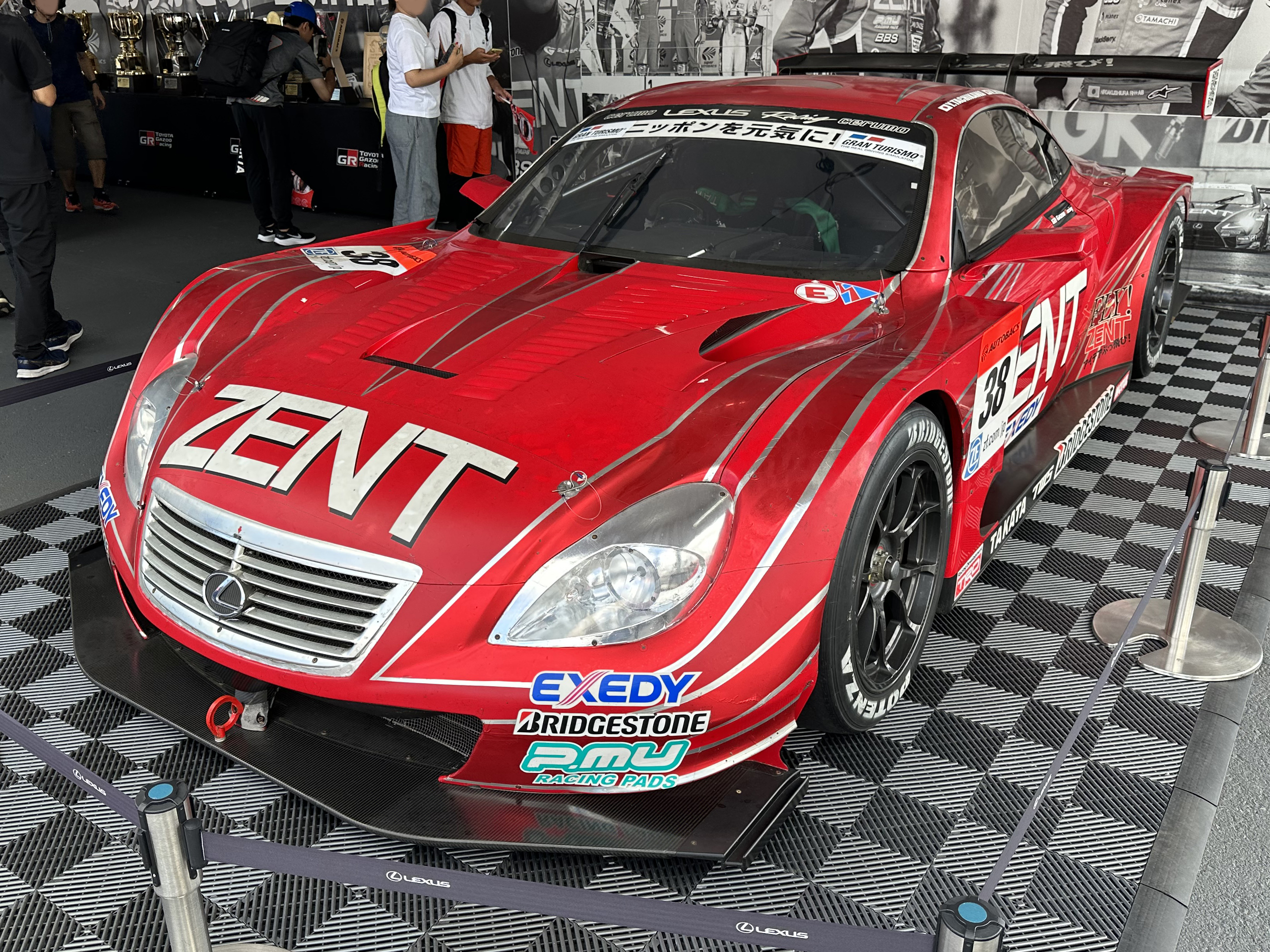
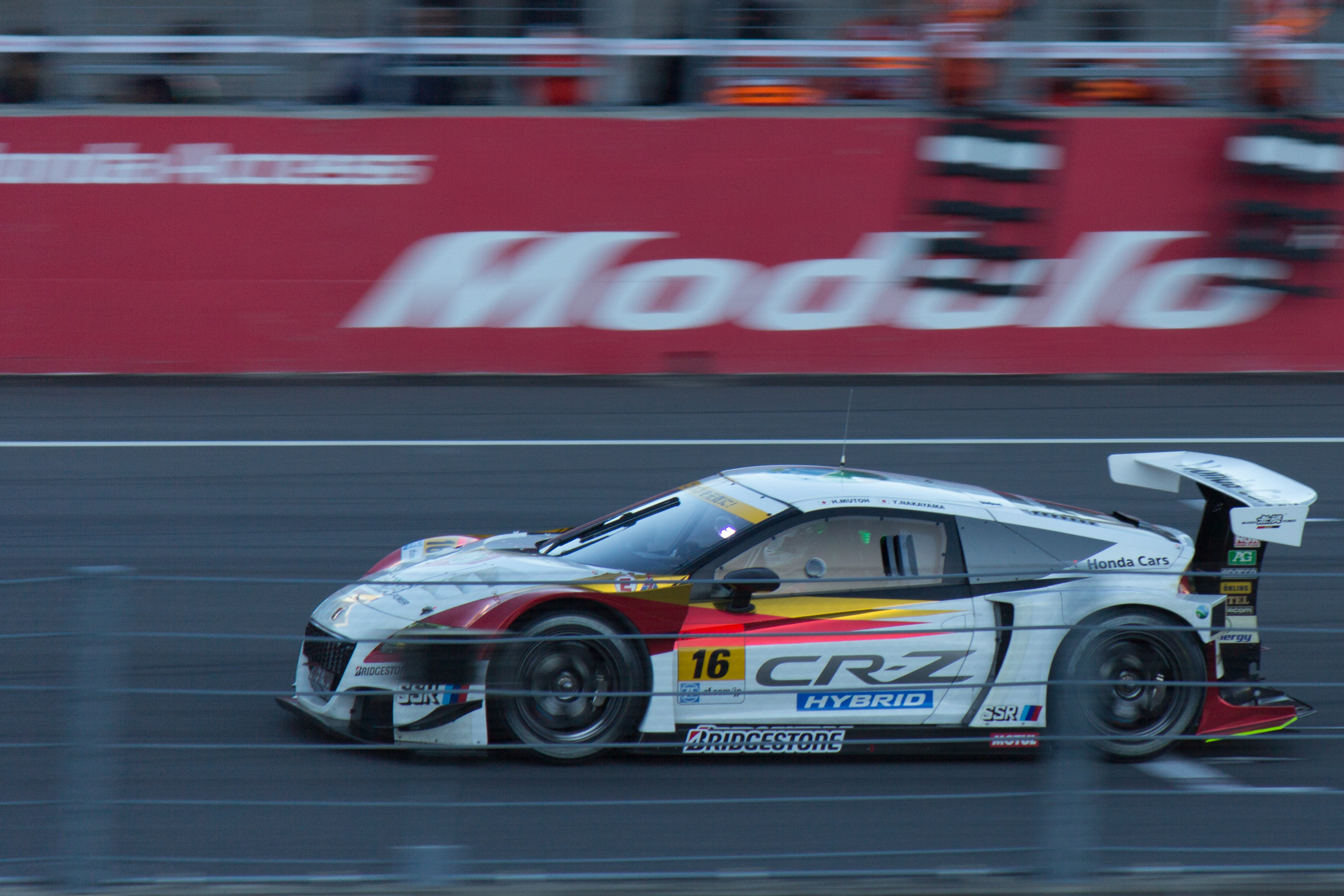
The No. 38 Cerumo car won the GT500 Drivers' and Teams' Championship title (pictured in 2023). The No. 16 Team Mugen car won the GT300 Drivers' and Teams' championship title.

== Schedule ==
An updated provisional calendar was released on November 1, 2012.

2013 Japanese venues

Round	Race	Circuit	Date
1	Okayama GT; 300 km	(Japan) Okayama International Circuit	April 7
2	Fuji GT 1; 500 km	(Japan) Fuji Speedway	April 29
3	Super GT International Series Malaysia; 300 km	(Malaysia) Sepang International Circuit	June 16
4	Sugo GT; 300 km	(Japan) Sportsland SUGO	July 28
5	42nd International Pokka Sapporo 1000km 1000 km	(Japan) Suzuka Circuit	August 18
6	Fuji GT 2; 300 km	(Japan) Fuji Speedway	September 8
Asian LMS	2013 Asian Le Mans Series; 3 Hours of Fuji^{1}	(Japan) Fuji Speedway	September 22
7	Autopolis GT; 300 km	(Japan) Autopolis	October 6
8	Motegi GT; 250 km	(Japan) Twin Ring Motegi	November 3
NC	Fuji Sprint Cup	(Japan) Fuji Speedway	November 23^{2}
NC	Fuji Sprint Cup	(Japan) Fuji Speedway	November 24^{2}

Notes:

- There was originally a non-championship race to be held at the Korea International Circuit scheduled for May 19 but was postponed and not held during the season.
- ^1 — The 3 Hours of Fuji is an optional points-scoring round that is only open to teams competing in the GT300 class, held as a part of the 2013 Asian Le Mans Series season, where the cars were reclassified as "SGT". Points and success ballast were to be counted if points were awarded to the top 10 finishers in the SGT class; no penalty was to be imposed on success ballast reduction if entrants miss the race.
- ^2 — Originally scheduled for November 16 and 17 but rescheduled to November 23 and 24.

== Drivers and teams ==
=== GT500 ===
Team	Make	Car	Engine	No.	Drivers	Tyre	Rounds
(Japan) MOLA	Nissan	Nissan GT-R GT500	Nissan VRH34B 3.4 L V8	1	(Japan) Satoshi Motoyama	M	All
(Japan) MOLA	Nissan	Nissan GT-R GT500	Nissan VRH34B 3.4 L V8	1	(Japan) Yuhi Sekiguchi	M	All
(Japan) Lexus Team LeMans ENEOS	Lexus	Lexus SC430 GT500	Lexus RV8KG 3.4 L V8	6	(Japan) Kazuya Oshima	B	All
(Japan) Lexus Team LeMans ENEOS	Lexus	Lexus SC430 GT500	Lexus RV8KG 3.4 L V8	6	(Japan) Yuji Kunimoto	B	All
(Japan) Autobacs Racing Team Aguri	Honda	Honda HSV-010 GT	Honda HR10EG 3.4 L V8	8	(Republic of Ireland) Ralph Firman	B	All
(Japan) Autobacs Racing Team Aguri	Honda	Honda HSV-010 GT	Honda HR10EG 3.4 L V8	8	(Japan) Kosuke Matsuura	B	All
(Japan) Team Impul	Nissan	Nissan GT-R GT500	Nissan VRH34B 3.4 L V8	12	(Japan) Tsugio Matsuda	B	All
(Japan) Team Impul	Nissan	Nissan GT-R GT500	Nissan VRH34B 3.4 L V8	12	(Brazil) João Paulo de Oliveira	B	All
(Japan) Keihin Real Racing	Honda	Honda HSV-010 GT	Honda HR10EG 3.4 L V8	17	(Japan) Toshihiro Kaneishi	B	All
(Japan) Keihin Real Racing	Honda	Honda HSV-010 GT	Honda HR10EG 3.4 L V8	17	(Japan) Koudai Tsukakoshi	B	All
(Japan) Weider Modulo Dome Racing	Honda	Honda HSV-010 GT	Honda HR10EG 3.4 L V8	18	(Japan) Naoki Yamamoto	M	All
(Japan) Weider Modulo Dome Racing	Honda	Honda HSV-010 GT	Honda HR10EG 3.4 L V8	18	(France) Frédéric Makowiecki	M	All
(Japan) Lexus Team WedsSport Bandoh	Lexus	Lexus SC430 GT500	Lexus RV8KG 3.4 L V8	19	(Japan) Seiji Ara	Y	All
(Japan) Lexus Team WedsSport Bandoh	Lexus	Lexus SC430 GT500	Lexus RV8KG 3.4 L V8	19	(Portugal) André Couto	Y	All
(Japan) Nismo	Nissan	Nissan GT-R GT500	Nissan VRH34B 3.4 L V8	23	(Japan) Masataka Yanagida	M	All
(Japan) Nismo	Nissan	Nissan GT-R GT500	Nissan VRH34B 3.4 L V8	23	(Italy) Ronnie Quintarelli	M	All
(Japan) Kondo Racing	Nissan	Nissan GT-R GT500	Nissan VRH34B 3.4 L V8	24	(Japan) Hironobu Yasuda	Y	All
(Japan) Kondo Racing	Nissan	Nissan GT-R GT500	Nissan VRH34B 3.4 L V8	24	(Germany) Michael Krumm	Y	All
(Japan) Nakajima Racing	Honda	Honda HSV-010 GT	Honda HR10EG 3.4 L V8	32	(Japan) Ryō Michigami	D	All
(Japan) Nakajima Racing	Honda	Honda HSV-010 GT	Honda HR10EG 3.4 L V8	32	(Japan) Daisuke Nakajima	D	All
(Japan) Lexus Team Petronas TOM'S	Lexus	Lexus SC430 GT500	Lexus RV8KG 3.4 L V8	36	(Japan) Kazuki Nakajima	B	All
(Japan) Lexus Team Petronas TOM'S	Lexus	Lexus SC430 GT500	Lexus RV8KG 3.4 L V8	36	(United Kingdom) James Rossiter	B	All
(Japan) Lexus Team KeePer TOM'S	Lexus	Lexus SC430 GT500	Lexus RV8KG 3.4 L V8	37	(Japan) Daisuke Ito	B	All
(Japan) Lexus Team KeePer TOM'S	Lexus	Lexus SC430 GT500	Lexus RV8KG 3.4 L V8	37	(Italy) Andrea Caldarelli	B	All
(Japan) Lexus Team ZENT Cerumo	Lexus	Lexus SC430 GT500	Lexus RV8KG 3.4 L V8	38	(Japan) Yuji Tachikawa	B	All
(Japan) Lexus Team ZENT Cerumo	Lexus	Lexus SC430 GT500	Lexus RV8KG 3.4 L V8	38	(Japan) Kohei Hirate	B	All
(Japan) Lexus Team SARD	Lexus	Lexus SC430 GT500	Lexus RV8KG 3.4 L V8	39	(Japan) Juichi Wakisaka	B	All
(Japan) Lexus Team SARD	Lexus	Lexus SC430 GT500	Lexus RV8KG 3.4 L V8	39	(Japan) Hiroaki Ishiura	B	All
(Japan) Team Kunimitsu	Honda	Honda HSV-010 GT	Honda HR10EG 3.4 L V8	100	(Japan) Takuya Izawa	B	All
(Japan) Team Kunimitsu	Honda	Honda HSV-010 GT	Honda HR10EG 3.4 L V8	100	(Japan) Takashi Kogure	B	All

=== GT300 ===
Team	Make	Car	Engine	No.	Drivers	Tyre	Rounds
(Japan) Team Taisan Ken Endless	Porsche	Porsche 997 GT3	Porsche M97/79 4.0 L F6	0	(Japan) Kyosuke Mineo	Y	All
(Japan) Team Taisan Ken Endless	Porsche	Porsche 997 GT3	Porsche M97/79 4.0 L F6	0	(Japan) Naoki Yokomizo	Y	All
(Japan) Cars Tokai Dream28	McLaren	McLaren MP4-12C GT3	McLaren M838T 3.8 L Twin Turbo V8	2	(Japan) Kazuho Takahashi	Y	All
(Japan) Cars Tokai Dream28	McLaren	McLaren MP4-12C GT3	McLaren M838T 3.8 L Twin Turbo V8	2	(Japan) Hiroki Katoh	Y	All
(Japan) Cars Tokai Dream28	McLaren	McLaren MP4-12C GT3	McLaren M838T 3.8 L Twin Turbo V8	2	(Netherlands) Carlo van Dam	Y	5
(Japan) NDDP Racing	Nissan	Nissan GT-R GT3	Nissan VR38DETT 3.8 L Twin Turbo V6	3	(Japan) Kazuki Hoshino	Y	1–8, FSC
(Japan) NDDP Racing	Nissan	Nissan GT-R GT3	Nissan VR38DETT 3.8 L Twin Turbo V6	3	(Japan) Daiki Sasaki	Y	1–8, FSC
(Japan) NDDP Racing	Nissan	Nissan GT-R GT3	Nissan VR38DETT 3.8 L Twin Turbo V6	3	(Spain) Lucas Ordóñez	Y	5
(Japan) GSR & Studie with Team Ukyo	BMW	BMW Z4 GT3	BMW P65B44 4.4 L V8	4	(Japan) Nobuteru Taniguchi	Y	1–8, FSC
(Japan) GSR & Studie with Team Ukyo	BMW	BMW Z4 GT3	BMW P65B44 4.4 L V8	4	(Japan) Tatsuya Kataoka	Y	1–8, FSC
(Japan) GSR & Studie with Team Ukyo	BMW	BMW Z4 GT3	BMW P65B44 4.4 L V8	4	(Germany) Jörg Müller	Y	5
(Japan) Team Mach	Ferrari	Ferrari 458 Italia GT3	Ferrari F136F 4.5 L V8	5	(Japan) Tetsuji Tamanaka	Y	1–3
(Japan) Team Mach	Ferrari	Ferrari 458 Italia GT3	Ferrari F136F 4.5 L V8	5	(Japan) Junichiro Yamashita	Y	1–3
(Japan) Team Mach	Ferrari	Ferrari 458 Italia GT3	Ferrari F136F 4.5 L V8	5	(Japan) Naofumi Omoto	Y	2
(Japan) Team Mach	Nissan	Nissan GT-R GT3	Nissan VR38DETT 3.8 L Twin Turbo V6	5	(Japan) Tetsuji Tamanaka	Y	5–8, LMS, FSC
(Japan) Team Mach	Nissan	Nissan GT-R GT3	Nissan VR38DETT 3.8 L Twin Turbo V6	5	(Japan) Junichiro Yamashita	Y	5–8, FSC
(Japan) Team Mach	Nissan	Nissan GT-R GT3	Nissan VR38DETT 3.8 L Twin Turbo V6	5	(Japan) Naofumi Omoto	Y	5
(Japan) Team Mach	Nissan	Nissan GT-R GT3	Nissan VR38DETT 3.8 L Twin Turbo V6	5	(Japan) Naoya Yamano	Y	LMS
(Japan) Bonds Racing	Nissan	Nissan GT-R GT3	Nissan VR38DETT 3.8 L Twin Turbo V6	7	(United States) Igor Sushko	Y	1–2
(Japan) Bonds Racing	Nissan	Nissan GT-R GT3	Nissan VR38DETT 3.8 L Twin Turbo V6	7	(Japan) Ryo Orime	Y	1
(Japan) Bonds Racing	Nissan	Nissan GT-R GT3	Nissan VR38DETT 3.8 L Twin Turbo V6	7	(Japan) Yuji Ide	Y	2
(Japan) Pacific Direction Racing	Porsche	Porsche 911 GT3-R	Porsche M97/79 4.0 L F6	9	(Japan) Shogo Mitsuyama	Y	1–8, FSC
(Japan) Pacific Direction Racing	Porsche	Porsche 911 GT3-R	Porsche M97/79 4.0 L F6	9	(Japan) You Yokomaku	Y	1–2, 4–8, FSC
(Japan) Pacific Direction Racing	Porsche	Porsche 911 GT3-R	Porsche M97/79 4.0 L F6	9	(Japan) Hisao Shigeta	Y	3
(Japan) Pacific Direction Racing	Porsche	Porsche 911 GT3-R	Porsche M97/79 4.0 L F6	9	(Japan) Yuya Sakamoto	Y	5
(Japan) Pacific Direction Racing	Porsche	Porsche 911 GT3-R	Porsche M97/79 4.0 L F6	9	(Japan) Akira Mizutani	Y	LMS
(Japan) Gainer	Mercedes-Benz	Mercedes-Benz SLS AMG GT3	Mercedes-Benz M159 6.2 L V8	10	(Japan) Tetsuya Tanaka	D	1–8, FSC
(Japan) Gainer	Mercedes-Benz	Mercedes-Benz SLS AMG GT3	Mercedes-Benz M159 6.2 L V8	10	(Japan) Masayuki Ueda	D	1–8, FSC
(Japan) Gainer	Mercedes-Benz	Mercedes-Benz SLS AMG GT3	Mercedes-Benz M159 6.2 L V8	10	(Japan) Masataka Kawaguchi	D	5
(Japan) Gainer	Mercedes-Benz	Mercedes-Benz SLS AMG GT3	Mercedes-Benz M159 6.2 L V8	11	(Japan) Katsuyuki Hiranaka	D	All
(Japan) Gainer	Mercedes-Benz	Mercedes-Benz SLS AMG GT3	Mercedes-Benz M159 6.2 L V8	11	(Sweden) Björn Wirdheim	D	All
(Japan) Team Mugen	Honda	Honda CR-Z GT	Honda HR28TT 2.8 L Twin Turbo Hybrid V6	16	(Japan) Hideki Mutoh	B	All
(Japan) Team Mugen	Honda	Honda CR-Z GT	Honda HR28TT 2.8 L Twin Turbo Hybrid V6	16	(Japan) Yuhki Nakayama	B	All
(Japan) Hitotsuyama Racing	Audi	Audi R8 LMS ultra	Audi CJJ 5.2 L V10	21	(Japan) Akihiro Tsuzuki	H	1–8, FSC
(Japan) Hitotsuyama Racing	Audi	Audi R8 LMS ultra	Audi CJJ 5.2 L V10	21	(United Kingdom) Richard Lyons	H	1–8, FSC
(Japan) R'Qs MotorSports	Mercedes-Benz	Mercedes-Benz SLS AMG GT3	Mercedes-Benz M159 6.2 L V8	22	(Japan) Hisashi Wada	Y	1–8, FSC
(Japan) R'Qs MotorSports	Mercedes-Benz	Mercedes-Benz SLS AMG GT3	Mercedes-Benz M159 6.2 L V8	22	(Japan) Masaki Jyonai	Y	1–8, FSC
(Japan) apr	Audi	Audi R8 LMS ultra	Audi CJJ 5.2 L V10	30	(Japan) Yuki Iwasaki	Y	1–3
(Japan) apr	Audi	Audi R8 LMS ultra	Audi CJJ 5.2 L V10	30	(Malaysia) Fairuz Fauzy	Y	1–2
(Japan) apr	Audi	Audi R8 LMS ultra	Audi CJJ 5.2 L V10	30	(Japan) Kenji Kobayashi	Y	2
(Japan) apr	Audi	Audi R8 LMS ultra	Audi CJJ 5.2 L V10	30	(United States) Igor Sushko	Y	3
(Japan) apr	Nissan	Nissan GT-R GT3	Nissan VR38DETT 3.8 L Twin Turbo V6	30	(Japan) Yuki Iwasaki	Y	4–8, LMS, FSC
(Japan) apr	Nissan	Nissan GT-R GT3	Nissan VR38DETT 3.8 L Twin Turbo V6	30	(United States) Igor Sushko	Y	4–8, LMS, FSC
(Japan) apr	Nissan	Nissan GT-R GT3	Nissan VR38DETT 3.8 L Twin Turbo V6	30	(Japan) Kenji Kobayashi	Y	5, LMS
(Japan) apr	Toyota	Toyota Prius apr GT	Toyota RV8KLM 3.4 L Hybrid V8	31	(Japan) Morio Nitta	Y	1–8, FSC
(Japan) apr	Toyota	Toyota Prius apr GT	Toyota RV8KLM 3.4 L Hybrid V8	31	(Japan) Koki Saga	Y	1–8, FSC
(Japan) apr	Toyota	Toyota Prius apr GT	Toyota RV8KLM 3.4 L Hybrid V8	31	(Japan) Yuichi Nakayama	Y	5
(Japan) Hankook KTR	Porsche	Porsche 911 GT3-R	Porsche M97/79 4.0 L F6	33	(Japan) Masami Kageyama	H	1–8, FSC
(Japan) Hankook KTR	Porsche	Porsche 911 GT3-R	Porsche M97/79 4.0 L F6	33	(Japan) Tomonobu Fujii	H	1–8, FSC
(Australia) Nismo Athlete Global Team	Nissan	Nissan GT-R GT3	Nissan VR38DETT 3.8 L Twin Turbo V6	35	(United Kingdom) Alex Buncombe	Y	FSC
(Australia) Nismo Athlete Global Team	Nissan	Nissan GT-R GT3	Nissan VR38DETT 3.8 L Twin Turbo V6	35	(Spain) Lucas Ordóñez	Y	FSC
(Japan) Dijon Racing	Nissan	Nissan GT-R GT3	Nissan VR38DETT 3.8 L Twin Turbo V6	48	(Japan) Hiroshi Takamori	Y	1–8, FSC
(Japan) Dijon Racing	Nissan	Nissan GT-R GT3	Nissan VR38DETT 3.8 L Twin Turbo V6	48	(Japan) Katsumasa Chiyo	Y	1–8, FSC
(Japan) Dijon Racing	Nissan	Nissan GT-R GT3	Nissan VR38DETT 3.8 L Twin Turbo V6	48	(Japan) Masaki Tanaka	Y	5
(Japan) Dijon Racing	Callaway	Callaway Corvette Z06.R GT3	Callaway LS7.R 7.0 L V8	96	(Japan) Masaki Tanaka	Y	2, 4, 6, FSC
(Japan) Dijon Racing	Callaway	Callaway Corvette Z06.R GT3	Callaway LS7.R 7.0 L V8	96	(Japan) Keiichi Inoue	Y	2, FSC
(Japan) Dijon Racing	Callaway	Callaway Corvette Z06.R GT3	Callaway LS7.R 7.0 L V8	96	(Japan) Shin Ikegami	Y	4, 6
(Japan) Arnage Racing	Aston Martin	Aston Martin V12 Vantage GT3	Aston Martin AM11 5.9 L V12	50	(Japan) Masaki Kano	Y	1–8, FSC
(Japan) Arnage Racing	Aston Martin	Aston Martin V12 Vantage GT3	Aston Martin AM11 5.9 L V12	50	(Japan) Hideto Yasuoka	Y	1–8, FSC
(Japan) Arnage Racing	Aston Martin	Aston Martin V12 Vantage GT3	Aston Martin AM11 5.9 L V12	50	(Japan) Ryohei Sakaguchi	Y	2, 5
(Japan) Okinawa-IMP Racing with Shift	Mercedes-Benz	Mercedes-Benz SLS AMG GT3	Mercedes-Benz M159 6.2 L V8	52	(Japan) Hironori Takeuchi	Y	1–8, LMS
(Japan) Okinawa-IMP Racing with Shift	Mercedes-Benz	Mercedes-Benz SLS AMG GT3	Mercedes-Benz M159 6.2 L V8	52	(Japan) Takeshi Tsuchiya	Y	1–8, LMS
(Japan) Okinawa-IMP Racing with Shift	Mercedes-Benz	Mercedes-Benz SLS AMG GT3	Mercedes-Benz M159 6.2 L V8	52	(Japan) Naoya Gamou	Y	5
(Japan) Okinawa-IMP Racing with Shift	Mercedes-Benz	Mercedes-Benz SLS AMG GT3	Mercedes-Benz M159 6.2 L V8	52	(Japan) Motoyoshi Yoshida	Y	LMS
(Japan) Autobacs Racing Team Aguri	Honda	Honda CR-Z GT	Honda HR28TT 2.8 L Twin Turbo Hybrid V6	55	(Japan) Shinichi Takagi	B	All
(Japan) Autobacs Racing Team Aguri	Honda	Honda CR-Z GT	Honda HR28TT 2.8 L Twin Turbo Hybrid V6	55	(Japan) Takashi Kobayashi	B	All
(Japan) Autobacs Racing Team Aguri	Honda	Honda CR-Z GT	Honda HR28TT 2.8 L Twin Turbo Hybrid V6	55	(Japan) Tomoki Nojiri	B	5, LMS
(Japan) R&D Sport	Subaru	Subaru BRZ GT300	Subaru EJ20 2.0 L Turbo F4	61	(Japan) Tetsuya Yamano	M	All
(Japan) R&D Sport	Subaru	Subaru BRZ GT300	Subaru EJ20 2.0 L Turbo F4	61	(Japan) Kota Sasaki	M	All
(Japan) R&D Sport	Subaru	Subaru BRZ GT300	Subaru EJ20 2.0 L Turbo F4	61	(Japan) Takuto Iguchi	M	5
(Japan) Leon Racing	Mercedes-Benz	Mercedes-Benz SLS AMG GT3	Mercedes-Benz M159 6.2 L V8	62	(Japan) Haruki Kurosawa	Y	All
(Japan) Leon Racing	Mercedes-Benz	Mercedes-Benz SLS AMG GT3	Mercedes-Benz M159 6.2 L V8	62	(Japan) Masanobu Kato	Y	1–2
(Japan) Leon Racing	Mercedes-Benz	Mercedes-Benz SLS AMG GT3	Mercedes-Benz M159 6.2 L V8	62	(Japan) Tsubasa Kurosawa	Y	2–8, LMS
(Japan) Leon Racing	Mercedes-Benz	Mercedes-Benz SLS AMG GT3	Mercedes-Benz M159 6.2 L V8	62	(Japan) Akihiko Nakaya	Y	5
(Japan) JLOC	Lamborghini	Lamborghini Gallardo GT3	Lamborghini CEH 5.2 L V10	86	(Japan) Koji Yamanishi	Y	1–8, FSC
(Japan) JLOC	Lamborghini	Lamborghini Gallardo GT3	Lamborghini CEH 5.2 L V10	86	(Japan) Shinya Hosokawa	Y	1–8, FSC
(Japan) JLOC	Lamborghini	Lamborghini Gallardo GT3	Lamborghini CEH 5.2 L V10	86	(Japan) Yuya Sakamoto	Y	2, 5
(Japan) JLOC	Lamborghini	Lamborghini Gallardo GT3	Lamborghini CEH 5.2 L V10	87	(Japan) Hideki Yamauchi	Y	1–8
(Japan) JLOC	Lamborghini	Lamborghini Gallardo GT3	Lamborghini CEH 5.2 L V10	87	(Japan) Hiroki Yoshimoto	Y	1–8
(Japan) JLOC	Lamborghini	Lamborghini Gallardo GT3	Lamborghini CEH 5.2 L V10	88	(Japan) Manabu Orido	Y	1–8
(Japan) JLOC	Lamborghini	Lamborghini Gallardo GT3	Lamborghini CEH 5.2 L V10	88	(Japan) Takayuki Aoki	Y	1–8
(Japan) JLOC	Lamborghini	Lamborghini Gallardo GT3	Lamborghini CEH 5.2 L V10	88	(Japan) Hideki Yamauchi	Y	FSC
(Japan) JLOC	Lamborghini	Lamborghini Gallardo GT3	Lamborghini CEH 5.2 L V10	88	(Japan) Hiroki Yoshimoto	Y	FSC
(Japan) Tomei Sports	Nissan	Nissan GT-R GT3	Nissan VR38DETT 3.8 L Twin Turbo V6	360	(Japan) Takuya Shirasaka	Y	1–4, 6–7
(Japan) Tomei Sports	Nissan	Nissan GT-R GT3	Nissan VR38DETT 3.8 L Twin Turbo V6	360	(Japan) Atsushi Tanaka	Y	1–4, 6–7

=== Entrant Changes ===
==== GT500 Class ====
- Nissan: Two-time and defending GT500 champions Masataka Yanagida and Ronnie Quintarelli, transferred from MOLA to the flagship NISMO team, who also switched from Bridgestone to Michelin tyres. Three-time GT500 champion Satoshi Motoyama transferred to MOLA, joining first-year GT500 driver Yuhi Sekiguchi in an all-new lineup. Two-time GT500 champion Michael Krumm transferred to Kondo Racing.
- Lexus: TOM's Racing expanded to a two-car team, with the number 37 Lexus Team KeePer TOM's squad taking over the entry vacated by Team Kraft's departure. Loïc Duval departed Super GT to drive full-time for Audi in the FIA World Endurance Championship, and was replaced by former Force India F1 reserve driver James Rossiter. Daisuke Ito and Andrea Caldarelli were named as the drivers for Lexus Team KeePer TOM's, while Yuji Kunimoto transferred to Lexus Team Eneos LeMans to replace Ito. Lexus Team SARD switched to Bridgestone tyres after two seasons with Michelin.
- Honda: FIA GT1 World Championship runner-up Frédéric Makowiecki replaced Carlo Van Dam at Weider Modulo Dome Racing, joined by Naoki Yamamoto, who transferred from Team Kunimitsu after four seasons. Dome also changed tyre suppliers from Bridgestone to Michelin. 2010 GT500 champion Takashi Kogure was transferred to Team Kunimitsu to replace Yamamoto. Kosuke Matsuura returned to the GT500 class with ARTA, and Daisuke Nakajima stepped up to GT500 for the first time with Nakajima Racing.

==== GT300 Class ====
- Team Taisan Ken Endless inherited the number 0 from last year's champions, Goodsmile Racing & Studie with Team UKYO. This began an informal tradition of GT300 teams designating the number 0 as the champion's number plate.
- Goodsmile Racing & Studie with Team UKYO consolidated their programme into a single-car operation, fielding the number 4 BMW Z4 GT3 for Nobuteru Taniguchi and Tatsuya Kataoka.
- For their first full-season effort since 2005, Team Mugen replaced GT500-bound Daisuke Nakajima with former Honda GT500 driver Yuhki Nakayama in their hybrid-powered Honda CR-Z GT300.
- Subaru and R&D Sport changed tyre suppliers from Yokohama to Michelin for their second season with the BRZ GT300.
- Autobacs Racing Team Aguri changed vehicles from the ASL Garaiya to the Honda CR-Z GT300. Takashi Kobayashi joined ARTA's GT300 squad after two seasons in their GT500 team. The team also changed its number from 43 to 55.
- Two-time GT300 champion Kazuki Hoshino and reigning All-Japan Formula 3 National Class champion Daiki Sasaki, formed an all-new driver lineup at NDDP Racing.
- Bonds Racing, a new team established by members of the former Lexus Team Kraft, entered the series for the first time with a Nissan GT-R NISMO GT3 driven in the first round by Igor Sushko and Ryo Orime.
- Tomei Sports changed vehicles from the Callaway Corvette Z06.R GT3 to the Nissan GT-R NISMO GT3.
- Dijon Racing changed their primary number 48 team's vehicle to the Nissan GT-R NISMO GT3, and signed NDDP graduate Katsumasa Chiyo as their pro driver to partner amateur driver Hiroshi Takamori. Dijon Racing would continue to enter their Callaway Corvette Z06.R GT3 in select races with the number 96, driven by Masaki Tanaka and Keiichi Inoue.
- Team a Speed withdrew from the series after the 2012 season. Arnage Racing, the garage responsible for vehicle maintenance, took over the programme under their own name, fielding the number 50 Aston Martin V12 Vantage GT3 for drivers Masaki Kano and Hideto Yasuoka.
- Cars Tokai Dream28 changed vehicles from the Mooncraft Shiden to the newest McLaren MP4-12C GT3.
- Gainer switched allegiances from Audi to Mercedes-Benz, and expanded back to a two-car team with two SLS AMG GT3s. The all-pro number 11 car added former GT500 driver Björn Wirdheim as team mate to Katsuyuki Hiranaka, while Tetsuya Tanaka moved to the pro-am number 10 car alongside Masayuki Ueda.
- LEON Racing spun off from Shift after the 2012 season. Operated by K2 R&D Co. Ltd., LEON Racing fielded the number 62 Mercedes-Benz SLS AMG GT3 for Haruki Kurosawa and Masanobu Kato. Shift would partner with Okinawa-IMP (International Motorsports Project), fielding the number 52 Mercedes-Benz SLS AMG for team founder Hironori Takeuchi and Takeshi Tsuchiya.
- R'Qs Motor Sports changed vehicles from the Vemac RD320R to the Mercedes-Benz SLS AMG GT3.
- Hitotsuyama Racing scaled back to a single-car programme with their number 21 Audi R8 LMS Ultra driven by Akihiro Tsuzuki and 2004 GT500 champion Richard Lyons. The team also changed tyre suppliers from Yokohama to Hankook.
- Fairuz Fauzy began the season driving apr's number 30 Audi R8 LMS Ultra, alongside Yuki Iwasaki.
- JLOC consolidated their entry from four cars to three cars, all fielding the latest Lamborghini Gallardo GT3. Hiroki Yoshimoto transferred from the defunct Team a Speed to the number 87 JLOC entry alongside Hideki Yamauchi. Koji Yamanishi transferred to the number 86 car, joined by Shinya Hosokawa, who rejoined JLOC after a year away from the series.
- LMP Motorsport withdrew from the series after the 2012 season. Pacific Racing Team and the Nakanihon Automotive College (NAC), who supported their efforts in 2012, partnered with Direction Racing (who themselves returned to the series after a year's absence) and entered as Pacific Direction Racing. Their number 9 Porsche 911 GT3-R, promoting the new animated series Ghost in the Shell: ARISE, was driven by Shogo Mitsuyama and Yu Yokomaku.
- Team SGC and their Lexus IS 350 withdrew from the series after the 2012 season.

=== Mid-season changes ===
==== GT300 Class ====
- Bonds Racing withdrew from the series after Igor Sushko and Yuji Ide finished fifth in the Fuji 500km. Sushko joined the number 30 apr crew from the third round in Sepang. In the fourth round, apr switched vehicles to Bonds' former Nissan GT-R NISMO GT3, and gained Freescale as a sponsor for the rest of the season.
- Tsubasa Kurosawa, the younger brother of Haruki, joined LEON Racing as a third driver for the Fuji 500km, then replaced Masanobu Kato for the rest of the season.
- After the third round, Team Mach replaced their Ferrari 458 GT3 with a Nissan GT-R NISMO GT3 from the Suzuka 1000km onwards.
- Third drivers for the Suzuka 1000km included Jörg Müller (GSR&Studie with Team UKYO), Carlo van Dam (Cars Tokai Dream28), Lucas Ordoñez (NDDP Racing), Tomoki Nojiri (ARTA), Yuichi Nakayama (apr #31), Akihiko Nakaya (LEON Racing), Naoya Gamou (Okinawa-IMP with Shift), Ryohei Sakaguchi (Arnage Racing), Naofumi Omoto (Team Mach), and Takuto Iguchi, who won the race as the third driver for R&D Sport.
- The NISMO Athlete Global Team entered as a one-off in the non-championship Fuji Sprint Cup race, with Ordoñez and Alex Buncombe driving the number 35 Nissan GT-R NISMO GT3.
- JLOC entered only a single Lamborghini Gallardo GT3 for Yoshimoto and Yamauchi in the Fuji Sprint Cup.

== Calendar ==
Round	Circuit	Date	Pole position	Race winner
1	(Japan) Okayama International Circuit; Report	7 April	#23 Nismo	#100 Team Kunimitsu
1	(Japan) Okayama International Circuit; Report	7 April	(Japan) Masataka Yanagida (Italy) Ronnie Quintarelli	(Japan) Takuya Izawa (Japan) Takashi Kogure
1	(Japan) Okayama International Circuit; Report	7 April	#61 R&D Sport	#11 Gainer
1	(Japan) Okayama International Circuit; Report	7 April	(Japan) Tetsuya Yamano (Japan) Kota Sasaki	(Japan) Katsuyuki Hiranaka (Sweden) Björn Wirdheim
2	(Japan) Fuji Speedway; Report	29 April	#36 Lexus Team Petronas TOM'S	#36 Lexus Team Petronas TOM'S
2	(Japan) Fuji Speedway; Report	29 April	(Japan) Kazuki Nakajima (United Kingdom) James Rossiter	(Japan) Kazuki Nakajima (United Kingdom) James Rossiter
2	(Japan) Fuji Speedway; Report	29 April	#61 R&D Sport	#31 apr
2	(Japan) Fuji Speedway; Report	29 April	(Japan) Tetsuya Yamano (Japan) Kota Sasaki	(Japan) Morio Nitta (Japan) Koki Saga
3	(Malaysia) Sepang International Circuit; Report	16 June	#12 Team Impul	#12 Team Impul
3	(Malaysia) Sepang International Circuit; Report	16 June	(Brazil) João Paulo de Oliveira (Japan) Tsugio Matsuda	(Brazil) João Paulo de Oliveira (Japan) Tsugio Matsuda
3	(Malaysia) Sepang International Circuit; Report	16 June	#55 ARTA	#55 ARTA
3	(Malaysia) Sepang International Circuit; Report	16 June	(Japan) Takashi Kobayashi (Japan) Shinichi Takagi	(Japan) Takashi Kobayashi (Japan) Shinichi Takagi
4	(Japan) Sportsland SUGO; Report	28 July	#1 MOLA	#8 ARTA
4	(Japan) Sportsland SUGO; Report	28 July	(Japan) Satoshi Motoyama (Japan) Yuhi Sekiguchi	(Japan) Kousuke Matsuura (Republic of Ireland) Ralph Firman
4	(Japan) Sportsland SUGO; Report	28 July	#61 R&D Sport	#55 ARTA
4	(Japan) Sportsland SUGO; Report	28 July	(Japan) Tetsuya Yamano (Japan) Kota Sasaki	(Japan) Takashi Kobayashi (Japan) Shinichi Takagi
5	(Japan) Suzuka Circuit; Report	18 August	#23 Nismo	#18 Dome Racing
5	(Japan) Suzuka Circuit; Report	18 August	(Japan) Masataka Yanagida (Italy) Ronnie Quintarelli	(Japan) Naoki Yamamoto (France) Frédéric Makowiecki
5	(Japan) Suzuka Circuit; Report	18 August	#61 R&D Sport	#61 R&D Sport
5	(Japan) Suzuka Circuit; Report	18 August	(Japan) Tetsuya Yamano (Japan) Kota Sasaki (Japan) Takuto Iguchi	(Japan) Tetsuya Yamano (Japan) Kota Sasaki (Japan) Takuto Iguchi
6	(Japan) Fuji Speedway; Report	8 September	#38 Lexus Team ZENT Cerumo	#38 Lexus Team ZENT Cerumo
6	(Japan) Fuji Speedway; Report	8 September	(Japan) Yuji Tachikawa (Japan) Kohei Hirate	(Japan) Yuji Tachikawa (Japan) Kohei Hirate
6	(Japan) Fuji Speedway; Report	8 September	#55 ARTA	#4 GSR & Studie with Team UKYO
6	(Japan) Fuji Speedway; Report	8 September	(Japan) Takashi Kobayashi (Japan) Shinichi Takagi	(Japan) Nobuteru Taniguchi (Japan) Tatsuya Kataoka
Asian LMS	(Japan) Fuji Speedway; Report	22 September	#16 Team Mugen	#16 Team Mugen
Asian LMS	(Japan) Fuji Speedway; Report	22 September	(Japan) Hideki Mutoh (Japan) Yuhki Nakayama	(Japan) Hideki Mutoh (Japan) Yuhki Nakayama
7	(Japan) Autopolis; Report	6 October	#38 Lexus Team ZENT Cerumo	#36 Lexus Team Petronas TOM'S
7	(Japan) Autopolis; Report	6 October	(Japan) Yuji Tachikawa (Japan) Kohei Hirate	(Japan) Kazuki Nakajima (United Kingdom) James Rossiter
7	(Japan) Autopolis; Report	6 October	#3 NDDP Racing	#4 GSR & Studie with Team UKYO
7	(Japan) Autopolis; Report	6 October	(Japan) Kazuki Hoshino (Japan) Daiki Sasaki	(Japan) Nobuteru Taniguchi (Japan) Tatsuya Kataoka
8	(Japan) Twin Ring Motegi; Report	3 November	#6 Lexus Team LeMans ENEOS	#6 Lexus Team LeMans ENEOS
8	(Japan) Twin Ring Motegi; Report	3 November	(Japan) Yuji Kunimoto (Japan) Kazuya Oshima	(Japan) Yuji Kunimoto (Japan) Kazuya Oshima
8	(Japan) Twin Ring Motegi; Report	3 November	#61 R&D Sport	#11 Gainer
8	(Japan) Twin Ring Motegi; Report	3 November	(Japan) Tetsuya Yamano (Japan) Kota Sasaki	(Japan) Katsuyuki Hiranaka (Sweden) Björn Wirdheim
NC	(Japan) Fuji Speedway; Report	23 November	#18 Dome Racing	#17 Keihin Real Racing
NC	(Japan) Fuji Speedway; Report	23 November	(Japan) Naoki Yamamoto	(Japan) Koudai Tsukakoshi
NC	(Japan) Fuji Speedway; Report	23 November	#3 NDDP Racing	#3 NDDP Racing
NC	(Japan) Fuji Speedway; Report	23 November	(Japan) Daiki Sasaki	(Japan) Daiki Sasaki
NC	(Japan) Fuji Speedway; Report	24 November	#6 Lexus Team LeMans ENEOS	#6 Lexus Team LeMans ENEOS
NC	(Japan) Fuji Speedway; Report	24 November	(Japan) Kazuya Oshima	(Japan) Kazuya Oshima
NC	(Japan) Fuji Speedway; Report	24 November	#3 NDDP Racing	#2 Cars Tokai Dream28
NC	(Japan) Fuji Speedway; Report	24 November	(Japan) Kazuki Hoshino	(Japan) Hiroki Katoh

== Standings ==
=== GT500 Drivers ===
Scoring system

Position	1st	2nd	3rd	4th	5th	6th	7th	8th	9th	10th
Points	20	15	11	8	6	5	4	3	2	1
Suzuka	25	18	13	10	8	6	5	4	3	2

Rank	Driver	No.	OKA (Japan)	FUJ (Japan)	SEP (Malaysia)	SUG (Japan)	SUZ (Japan)	FUJ (Japan)	AUT (Japan)	MOT (Japan)	Pts.
1	(Japan) Kohei Hirate (Japan) Yuji Tachikawa	38	4	2	14	11	11	1	2	3	69
2	(Japan) Toshihiro Kaneishi (Japan) Koudai Tsukakoshi	17	2	Ret	5	Ret	7	2	3	2	67
3	(Japan) Kazuki Nakajima (United Kingdom) James Rossiter	36	12	1	11	10	3	12	1	5	60
4	(France) Frédéric Makowiecki (Japan) Naoki Yamamoto	18	5	10	4	13	1	5	5	7	56
5	(Japan) Yuji Kunimoto (Japan) Kazuya Oshima	6	7	3	7	6	Ret	4	11	1	52
6	(Italy) Ronnie Quintarelli (Japan) Masataka Yanagida	23	3	Ret	9	3	2	9	8	8	50
7	(Japan) Hiroaki Ishiura (Japan) Juichi Wakisaka	39	8	4	2	4	9	11	7	4	49
8	(Italy) Andrea Caldarelli (Japan) Daisuke Ito	37	15	6	10	2	5	3	9	6	47
9	(Brazil) João Paulo de Oliveira (Japan) Tsugio Matsuda	12	6	5	1	Ret	4	6	Ret	13	46
10	(Japan) Takuya Izawa (Japan) Takashi Kogure	100	1	7	3	12	10	Ret	12	12	37
11	(Republic of Ireland) Ralph Firman (Japan) Kosuke Matsuura	8	9	8	8	1	12	8	14	15	31
12	(Japan) Satoshi Motoyama (Japan) Yuhi Sekiguchi	1	10	9	6	7	8	7	4	14	28
13	(Germany) Michael Krumm (Japan) Hironobu Yasuda	24	13	12	13	5	Ret	10	6	9	14
14	(Japan) Seiji Ara (Portugal) André Couto	19	14	11	15	9	6	Ret	13	10	9
15	(Japan) Ryō Michigami (Japan) Daisuke Nakajima	32	11	13	12	8	13	Ret	10	11	4
Rank	Driver	No.	OKA (Japan)	FUJ (Japan)	SEP (Malaysia)	SUG (Japan)	SUZ (Japan)	FUJ (Japan)	AUT (Japan)	MOT (Japan)	Pts.

Colour	Result
Gold	Winner
Silver	Second place
Bronze	Third place
Green	Points classification
Blue	Non-points classification
Blue	Non-classified finish (NC)
Purple	Retired, not classified (Ret)
Red	Did not qualify (DNQ)
Red	Did not pre-qualify (DNPQ)
Black	Disqualified (DSQ)
White	Did not start (DNS)
White	Withdrew (WD)
White	Race cancelled (C)
Blank	Did not practice (DNP)
Blank	Did not arrive (DNA)
Blank	Excluded (EX)

==== GT500 Teams' standings ====
Rank	Team	No.	OKA (Japan)	FUJ (Japan)	SEP (Malaysia)	SUG (Japan)	SUZ (Japan)	FUJ (Japan)	AUT (Japan)	MOT (Japan)	FUJ (Japan)	FUJ (Japan)	Pts.
1	Lexus Team ZENT Cerumo	38	4	2	14	11	11	1	2	3	2	4	89
2	Keihin Real Racing	17	2	Ret	5	Ret	7	2	3	2	1	6	85
3	Lexus Team Petronas TOM'S	36	12	1	11	10	3	12	1	5	5	2	80
4	Weider Modulo Dome Racing	18	5	10	4	13	1	5	5	7	4	8	77
5	Lexus Team LeMans ENEOS	6	7	3	7	6	Ret	4	11	1	11	1	72
6	Nismo	23	3	Ret	9	3	2	9	8	8	7	14	71
7	Lexus Team SARD	39	8	4	2	4	9	11	7	4	9	7	70
8	Lexus Team KeePer TOM'S	37	15	6	10	2	5	3	9	6	Ret	11	69
9	Team Impul	12	6	5	1	Ret	4	6	Ret	13	8	3	63
10	Team Kunimitsu	100	1	7	3	12	10	Ret	12	12	3	5	55
11	Autobacs Racing Team Aguri	8	9	8	8	1	12	8	14	15	13	13	49
12	MOLA	1	10	9	6	7	8	7	4	14	Ret	15	47
13	Kondo Racing	24	13	12	13	5	Ret	10	6	9	10	10	32
14	Lexus Team WedsSport Bandoh	19	14	11	15	9	6	Ret	13	10	6	9	25
15	Nakajima Racing	32	11	13	12	8	13	Ret	10	11	12	12	19
Rank	Team	No.	OKA (Japan)	FUJ (Japan)	SEP (Malaysia)	SUG (Japan)	SUZ (Japan)	FUJ (Japan)	AUT (Japan)	MOT (Japan)	FUJ (Japan)	FUJ (Japan)	Pts.

=== GT300 Drivers ===
Scoring system

Position	1st	2nd	3rd	4th	5th	6th	7th	8th	9th	10th
Points	20	15	11	8	6	5	4	3	2	1
Suzuka	25	18	13	10	8	6	5	4	3	2
AsLMS Fuji	8	6	5	4	3	2	1	1	1	1

Rank	Driver	No.	OKA (Japan)	FUJ (Japan)	SEP (Malaysia)	SUG (Japan)	SUZ (Japan)	FUJ (Japan)	FUJ (Japan)	AUT (Japan)	MOT (Japan)	Pts.
1	(Japan) Hideki Mutoh (Japan) Yuhki Nakayama	16	7	2	2	2	5	8	1	9	2	85
2	(Japan) Katsuyuki Hiranaka (Sweden) Björn Wirdheim	11	1	6	3	13	6	7	2	4	1	80
3	(Japan) Tatsuya Kataoka (Japan) Nobuteru Taniguchi	4	2	9	6	15	DSQ	1		1	4	70
4	(Japan) Kota Sasaki (Japan) Tetsuya Yamano	61	5	Ret	4	6	1	9	3	7	3	66
5	(Japan) Hironori Takeuchi (Japan) Takeshi Tsuchiya	52	4	4	12	4	2	10	6	3	7	60
6	(Japan) Haruki Kurosawa	62	6	8	8	7	3	4	8	18	6	42
7	(Japan) Takashi Kobayashi (Japan) Shinichi Takagi	55	12	19	1	1	Ret	16	Ret	16	15	40
8	(Japan) Koki Saga (Japan) Morio Nitta	31	Ret	1	Ret	22	15	2		15	20	35
9	(Japan) Tsubasa Kurosawa	62			8	7	3	4	8	18	6	34
10	(Japan) Takuto Iguchi	61					1					25
11	(Japan) Hideki Yamauchi (Japan) Hiroki Yoshimoto	87/88	3	7	Ret	5	Ret	20		10	8	25
12	(Japan) Kyosuke Mineo (Japan) Naoki Yokomizo	0	10	NC	11	3	7	19	4	8	10	25
13	(Japan) Shinya Hosokawa (Japan) Koji Yamanishi	86	11	3	9	12	Ret	3		13	13	24
14	(Japan) Takayuki Aoki (Japan) Manabu Orido	88	Ret	12	5	18	4	Ret		12	5	22
15	(Japan) Masaki Kano (Japan) Hideto Yasuoka	50	20	Ret	20	14	8	18		2	Ret	19
16	(Japan) Naoya Gamou	52					2					18
17	(Japan) Kazuki Hoshino (Japan) Daiki Sasaki	3	Ret	Ret	10	9	9	5		Ret	9	14
18	(United States) Igor Sushko	7/30	13	5	17	20	17	12	Ret	6	14	11
19	(Japan) Tomonobu Fujii (Japan) Masami Kageyama	33	8	16	Ret	17	10	15		5	11	11
20	(Japan) Tetsuya Tanaka (Japan) Masayuki Ueda	10	15	10	7	10	13	6		20	12	11
21	(Japan) Masanobu Kato	62	6	8								8
22	(Japan) Yuji Ide	7		5								6
23	(Japan) Yuki Iwasaki	30	14	15	17	20	17	12	Ret	6	14	5
24	(Japan) Ryohei Sakaguchi	50		Ret			8					4
25	(Japan) Hiroki Katoh (Japan) Kazuho Takahashi	2	Ret	18	15	16	18	14	5	11	17	3
26	(United Kingdom) Richard Lyons (Japan) Akihiro Tsuzuki	21	16	Ret	14	8	11	13		21	21	3
27	(Spain) Lucas Ordóñez	3					9					3
28	(Japan) Katsumasa Chiyo (Japan) Hiroshi Takamori	48	9	11	13	11	16	Ret		17	18	2
29	(Japan) Tetsuji Tamanaka	5	17	17	16		19	11	9	22	22	1
30	(Japan) Naoya Yamano	5							9			1
-	(Japan) Junichiro Yamashita	5	17	17	16		19	11		22	22	0
-	(Japan) Masaki Jyonai (Japan) Hisashi Wada	22	Ret	13	Ret	19	13	17		14	16	0
-	(Japan) Ryo Orime	7	13									0
-	(Malaysia) Fairuz Fauzy	30	14	15								0
-	(Japan) Shogo Mitsuyama	9	19	14	19	21	14	21		19	19	0
-	(Japan) You Yokomaku	9	19	14		21	14	21		19	19	0
-	(Japan) Yuya Sakamoto	9					14					0
-	(Japan) Yuichi Nakayama	31					15					0
-	(Japan) Masaki Tanaka	96/48		Ret		24	16	22				0
-	(Japan) Kenji Kobayashi	30		15			17		Ret			0
-	(Japan) Takuya Shirasaka (Japan) Atsushi Tanaka	360	18	Ret	18	23		23		23		0
-	(Netherlands) Carlo van Dam	2					18					0
-	(Japan) Hisao Shigeta	9			19							0
-	(Japan) Naofumi Omoto	5		17			19					0
-	(Japan) Shin Ikegami	96				24		22				0
-	(Japan) Keiichi Inoue	96		Ret								0
-	(Japan) Yuya Sakamoto	86		3			Ret					0
-	(Japan) Akihiko Nakaya	62					3					0
-	(Japan) Motoyoshi Yoshida	52							6			0
-	(Japan) Masataka Kawaguchi	10					13					0
-	(Japan) Tomoki Nojiri	55					Ret		Ret			0
-	(Germany) Jörg Müller	4					DSQ					0
Rank	Driver	No.	OKA (Japan)	FUJ (Japan)	SEP (Malaysia)	SUG (Japan)	SUZ (Japan)	FUJ (Japan)	FUJ (Japan)	AUT (Japan)	MOT (Japan)	Pts.

Colour	Result
Gold	Winner
Silver	Second place
Bronze	Third place
Green	Points classification
Blue	Non-points classification
Blue	Non-classified finish (NC)
Purple	Retired, not classified (Ret)
Red	Did not qualify (DNQ)
Red	Did not pre-qualify (DNPQ)
Black	Disqualified (DSQ)
White	Did not start (DNS)
White	Withdrew (WD)
White	Race cancelled (C)
Blank	Did not practice (DNP)
Blank	Did not arrive (DNA)
Blank	Excluded (EX)

=== GT300 Drivers' championship ===
==== GT300 Teams' standings ====
Rank	Team	No.	OKA (Japan)	FUJ (Japan)	SEP (Malaysia)	SUG (Japan)	SUZ (Japan)	FUJ (Japan)	FUJ (Japan)	AUT (Japan)	MOT (Japan)	FUJ (Japan)	FUJ (Japan)	Pts.
1	Team Mugen	16	7	2	2	2	5	8	1	9	2	6	5	103
2	Gainer	11	1	6	3	13	6	7	2	4	1	2	2	94
3	GSR & Studie with Team Ukyo	4	2	9	6	15	DSQ	1		1	4	Ret	3	89
4	R&D Sport	61	5	Ret	4	6	1	9	3	7	3	Ret	22	73
5	Okinawa-IMP Racing with Shift	52	4	4	12	4	2	10	6	3	7			71
6	Leon Racing	62	6	8	8	7	3	4	8	18	6	5	10	65
7	Autobacs Racing Team Aguri	55	12	19	1	1	Ret	16	Ret	16	15	3	4	52
8	apr	31	Ret	1	Ret	22	15	2		15	20	12	15	51
9	Team Taisan ENDLESS	0	10	NC	11	3	7	19	4	8	10	7	13	38
10	JLOC	86	11	3	9	12	Ret	3		13	13	15	16	35
11	JLOC	87	3	7	Ret	5	Ret	20		10	8			35
12	JLOC	88	Ret	12	5	18	4	Ret		12	5	8	8	33
13	Arnage Racing	50	20	Ret	20	14	8	18		2	Ret	16	12	28
14	NDDP Racing	3	Ret	Ret	10	9	9	5		Ret	9	1	7	23
15	Gainer	10	15	10	7	10	13	6		20	12	11	6	22
16	Hankook KTR	33	8	16	Ret	17	10	15		5	11	Ret	9	22
17	apr	30	14	15	17	20	17	12	Ret	6	14	20	11	21
18	Hitotsuyama Racing	21	16	Ret	14	8	11	13		21	21	13	19	19
19	Cars Tokai Dream28	2	Ret	18	15	16	18	14	5	11	17	14	1	11
20	Dijon Racing	48	9	11	13	11	16	Ret		17	18	4	20	11
21	Bonds Racing	7	13	5										6
22	Team Mach	5	17	17	16		19	11	9	22	22	10	Ret	6
23	R'QS Motorsports	22	Ret	13	Ret	19	13	17		14	16	9	14	6
24	Pacific Direction Racing	9	19	14	19	21	14	21		19	19	17	17	5
25	Tomei Sports	360	18	Ret	18	23		23		23				4
26	Dijon Racing	96		Ret		24		22				18	21	3
-	Nismo Athlete Global Team	35										19	18	2
Rank	Team	No.	OKA (Japan)	FUJ (Japan)	SEP (Malaysia)	SUG (Japan)	SUZ (Japan)	FUJ (Japan)	FUJ (Japan)	AUT (Japan)	MOT (Japan)	FUJ (Japan)	FUJ (Japan)	Pts.

== JAF Grand Prix ==
=== GT500 Drivers ===
Rank	No.	Team	Race 1 Driver	Race 2 Driver	Race 1	Race 2	PTS
1	17	Keihin Real Racing	(Japan) Koudai Tsukakoshi	(Japan) Toshihiro Kaneishi	1	6	25
2	38	Lexus Team Zent Cerumo	(Japan) Yuji Tachikawa	(Japan) Kohei Hirate	2	4	23
3	36	Lexus Team Petronas TOM'S	(United Kingdom) James Rossiter	(Japan) Kazuki Nakajima	5	2	21
4	6	Lexus Team LeMans ENEOS	(Japan) Yuji Kunimoto	(Japan) Kazuya Oshima	11	1	20
5	100	Raybrig Team Kunimitsu	(Japan) Takashi Kogure	(Japan) Takuya Izawa	3	5	17
6	12	Calsonic Team Impul	(Japan) Tsugio Matsuda	(Brazil) João Paulo de Oliveira	8	3	14
7	18	Weider Dome Racing	(Japan) Naoki Yamamoto	(France) Frédéric Makowiecki	4	8	11
8	19	Lexus Team WedsSport Bandoh	(Portugal) Andre Couto	(Japan) Seiji Ara	6	9	7
9	39	Lexus Team DENSO SARD	(Japan) Juichi Wakisaka	(Japan) Hiroaki Ishiura	9	7	6
10	23	Motul Autech NISMO	(Italy) Ronnie Quintarelli	(Japan) Masataka Yanagida	7	14	4
11	24	D'Station ADVAN Kondo Racing	(Japan) Hironobu Yasuda	(Germany) Michael Krumm	10	10	2
	37	Lexus Team KeePer TOM'S	(Italy) Andrea Caldarelli	(Japan) Daisuke Ito	Ret	11	0
	32	Epson Nakajima Racing	(Japan) Daisuke Nakajima	(Japan) Ryō Michigami	12	12	0
	8	Autobacs Racing Team Aguri	(Japan) Kosuke Matsuura	(Republic of Ireland) Ralph Firman	13	13	0
	1	S-Road REITO MOLA	(Japan) Yuhi Sekiguchi	(Japan) Satoshi Motoyama	Ret	15	0

=== GT300 Drivers ===
Rank	No.	Team	Race 1 Driver	Race 2 Driver	Race 1	Race 2	PTS
1	11	Gainer	(Sweden) Björn Wirdheim	(Japan) Katsuyuki Hiranaka	2	2	30
2	3	NDDP Racing	(Japan) Daiki Sasaki	(Japan) Kazuki Hoshino	1	7	24
3	2	Cars Tokai Dream28	(Japan) Kazuho Takahashi	(Japan) Hiroki Katoh	14	1	20
4	55	Autobacs Racing Team Aguri	(Japan) Takashi Kobayashi	(Japan) Shinichi Takagi	3	4	19
5	4	GSR Hatsune Miku	(Japan) Tatsuya Kataoka	(Japan) Nobuteru Taniguchi	Ret	3	11
6	16	Team Mugen	(Japan) Hideki Mutoh	(Japan) Yuhki Nakayama	6	5	11
7	48	Dijon Racing	(Japan) Katsumasa Chiyo	(Japan) Hiroshi Takamori	4	20	8
8	62	Leon Racing	(Japan) Haruki Kurosawa	(Japan) Tsubasa Kurosawa	5	10	7
9	88	JLOC	(Japan) Hideki Yamauchi	(Japan) Hiroki Yoshimoto	8	8	6
10	10	Gainer	(Japan) Masayuki Ueda	(Japan) Tetsuya Tanaka	11	6	5
11	0	Team Taisan Ken Endless	(Japan) Kyosuke Mineo	(Japan) Naoki Yokomizo	7	13	4
12	22	R'Qs MotorSports	(Japan) Masaki Jyonai	(Japan) Hisashi Wada	9	14	2
13	33	Hankook KTR	(Japan) Masami Kageyama	(Japan) Tomonobu Fujii	Ret	9	2
14	5	Team Mach	(Japan) Junichiro Yamashita	(Japan) Tetsuji Tamanaka	10	Ret	1
	30	apr	(United States) Igor Sushko	(Japan) Yuki Iwasaki	20	11	0
	31	apr	(Japan) Koki Saga	(Japan) Morio Nitta	12	15	0
	50	Arnage Racing	(Japan) Masaki Kano	(Japan) Hideto Yasuoka	16	12	0
	21	Hitotsuyama Racing	(United Kingdom) Richard Lyons	(Japan) Akihiro Tsuzuki	13	19	0
	86	JLOC	(Japan) Koji Yamanishi	(Japan) Shinya Hosokawa	15	16	0
	9	Pacific Direction Racing	(Japan) You Yokomaku	(Japan) Shogo Mitsuyama	17	17	0
	35	Nismo Athlete Global Team	(United Kingdom) Alex Buncombe	(Spain) Lucas Ordóñez	19	18	0
	96	Dijon Racing	(Japan) Keiichi Inoue	(Japan) Masaki Tanaka	18	21	0
	61	R&D Sport	(Japan) Kota Sasaki	(Japan) Tetsuya Yamano	Ret	22	0
