= Real Racing =

Real Racing may refer to:

- Real Racing (racing team), a Japanese racing team
- Real Racing (video game), a 2009 racing game
