= Masaki Jyonai =

Japanese racing driver and businessman

- Nationality: Japanese
- Born: 9 September 1962 (age 64) Aichi Prefecture, Japan

Super GT career
- Debut season: 1997
- Current team: R'Qs Motor Sports
- Categorisation: FIA Bronze
- Car number: 22
- Former teams: SigmaTec Racing Team, Team Gaikokuya, Arktech Motorsports, Team LeyJun, A&S Racing, Tomei Sports
- Starts: 153
- Wins: 2
- Podiums: 5
- Poles: 0
- Fastest laps: 0
- Best finish: 5th in 1997

Masaki Jyonai (城内 政樹, Jōnai Masaki; born 9 September 1962) is a Japanese businessman and former racing driver.

== Racing career ==
Jyonai started karting in 1988; he is noted for his extensive experience in kart racing, having won numerous karting championships. He moved to car racing in 1993, racing in the Suzuka 1000 km in the Proto 2 class; he won on his debut.

Jyonai began competing in Super GT in 1997 with the SigmaTec Racing Team. As of 2023, he has won two races; his best finish in the championship is fifth, achieved in his first year in the series. Outside of racing, Jyonai is the CEO and President of Marusho Co. Ltd., a company involved in the lighting, security and construction sectors. He is also a lecturer at the karting classes of Honda Racing School Suzuka as well as a color commentator for various television programs.

Jyonai occasionally competes using the pseudonym Guts Jyonai (Guts城内, Gattsu Jōnai); Jyonai says he took the name from comedian Guts Ishimatsu. In more recent years, he has reverted to using his real name. Jyonai retired from racing following the 2026 Super GT Series.

== Racing record ==
=== Complete Super GT results ===
(key) (Races in bold indicate pole position) (Races in italics indicate fastest lap)

Year	Team	Car	Class	1	2	3	4	5	6	7	8	9	DC	Points
1997	SigmaTec Racing Team	Porsche 911 GT2	GT300	SUZ	FUJ; 6	SEN; 7	FUJ; 6	MIN; 2	SUG; 1				5th	51
1998	SigmaTec Racing Team	Porsche 911 GT2	GT300	SUZ; Ret	FUJ; C	SEN; 9	FUJ; 4	MOT	MIN	SUG; 16			21st	12
1999	SigmaTec Racing Team	Porsche 911 GT2	GT300	SUZ; DSQ	FUJ; 3	SUG; 6	MIN; 11	FUJ; 19	TAI; Ret	MOT; DNS			15th	18
2000	SigmaTec Racing Team	Porsche 911 GT2	GT300	MOT	FUJ; 12	SUG; 4	FUJ; Ret	TAI; 4	MIN; 7	SUZ; 5			11th	32
2001	SigmaTec Racing Team	Toyota MR-S	GT300	TAI; Ret	FUJ	SUG; Ret	FUJ; Ret	MOT; Ret	SUZ; 11	MIN; 1			14th	20
2002	SigmaTec Racing Team	Toyota MR-S	GT300	TAI; 14	FUJ; 2	SUG; Ret	SEP	FUJ; Ret	MOT; 10	MIN; 13	SUZ; 6		15th	24
2003	SigmaTec Racing Team	Toyota MR-S	GT300	TAI; 4	FUJ; 7	SUG; Ret	FUJ; 18	FUJ	MOT	AUT	SUZ		16th	16
2003	SigmaTec Racing Team	Toyota Celica	GT300	TAI	FUJ	SUG	FUJ	FUJ; Ret	MOT	AUT	SUZ		16th	16
2004	Team Gaikokuya	Porsche 911 GT3-R	GT300	TAI; 13	SUG; 21	SEP	TOK	MOT	AUT	SUZ			20th	2
2004	Arktech Motorsports	Porsche 911 GT3	GT300	TAI	SUG	SEP	TOK; 20	MOT; 9	AUT	SUZ; 17			20th	2
2005	Team LeyJun	Porsche 968 GT4	GT300	OKA; Ret	FUJ; Ret	SEP; NC	SUG; 16	MOT; DSQ	FUJ; 14	AUT; Ret	SUZ; Ret		NC	0
2006	Team LeyJun	Porsche 911 GT3	GT300	SUZ; Ret	OKA	FUJ; 16	SEP	SUG	SUZ; 15	MOT; 23	AUT	FUJ; 25	37th	1
2007	A&S Racing	Mosler MT900R	GT300	SUZ; Ret	OKA; 23	FUJ; Ret	SEP	SUG	SUZ	MOT	AUT	FUJ	NC	0
2007	Arktech Motorsports	Porsche Boxster	GT300	SUZ	OKA	FUJ	SEP	SUG; 17	SUZ; Ret	MOT	AUT; 17	FUJ; 19	NC	0
2008	Arktech Motorsports	Porsche Boxster	GT300	SUZ; 15	OKA	FUJ	SEP	SUG	SUZ	MOT	AUT	FUJ	NC	0
2008	Tomei Sports	Porsche 911 GT3	GT300	SUZ	OKA	FUJ	SEP	SUG	SUZ; 16	MOT	AUT; 16	FUJ; 15	NC	0
2010	R'Qs Motor Sports	Vemac RD350R	GT300	SUZ	OKA	FUJ	SEP	SUG	SUZ; 13	FUJ; C	MOT; 18		NC	0
2011	R'Qs Motor Sports	Vemac RD350R	GT300	OKA; 13	FUJ; 13	SEP; 16	SUG; Ret	SUZ; 19	FUJ	AUT; 14	MOT		NC	0
2012	R'Qs Motor Sports	Vemac RD350R	GT300	OKA; 16	FUJ; 12	SEP; 18	SUG; DNQ	SUZ; 12	FUJ; 16	AUT; 18	MOT		NC	0
2013	R'Qs Motor Sports	Mercedes-Benz SLS AMG GT3	GT300	OKA; Ret	FUJ; 13	SEP; Ret	SUG; 19	SUZ; 12	FUJ; 17	FSW	AUT; 14	MOT; 16	NC	0
2014	R'Qs Motor Sports	Mercedes-Benz SLS AMG GT3	GT300	OKA	FUJ	AUT	SUG	FUJ; 11	SUZ; 15	CHA; 9	MOT; 14		35th	2
2015	R'Qs Motor Sports	Mercedes-Benz SLS AMG GT3	GT300	OKA; DNS	FUJ	CHA; 15	FUJ; 10	SUZ; 16	SUG; 10	AUT; 22	MOT; 24		32nd	2
2016	R'Qs Motor Sports	Mercedes-Benz SLS AMG GT3	GT300	OKA; 19	FUJ; Ret	SUG; 20	FUJ; Ret	SUZ; 23	CHA; 18	MOT; 21	MOT; 21		NC	0
2017	R'Qs Motor Sports	Mercedes-Benz SLS AMG GT3	GT300	OKA; 24	FUJ; 23	AUT; 26	SUG	FUJ; 26	SUZ; 21	CHA	MOT; 25		NC	0
2018	R'Qs Motor Sports	Mercedes-AMG GT3	GT300	OKA; 19	FUJ; 25	SUZ; 25	CHA	FUJ; 21	SUG; DNQ	AUT; 25	MOT; 28		NC	0
2019	R'Qs Motor Sports	Mercedes-AMG GT3	GT300	OKA; 17	FUJ; 20	SUZ; 26	CHA	FUJ; 23	AUT; Ret	SUG	MOT; 26		NC	0
2020	R'Qs Motor Sports	Mercedes-AMG GT3	GT300	FUJ; 24	FUJ; 28	SUZ; 23	MOT; Ret	FUJ	SUZ; 26	MOT; 28	FUJ; 27		NC	0
2021	R'Qs Motor Sports	Mercedes-AMG GT3 EVO 2020	GT300	OKA; 20	FUJ; Ret	SUZ; 28	MOT; 21	SUG	AUT; Ret	MOT	FUJ		NC	0
2022	R'Qs Motor Sports	Mercedes-AMG GT3 EVO 2020	GT300	OKA; 25	FUJ; Ret	SUZ	FUJ; 20	SUZ; 21	SUG; 24	AUT; 24	MOT; 22		NC	0
2023	R'Qs Motor Sports	Mercedes-AMG GT3 EVO 2020	GT300	OKA; 20	FUJ; 21	SUZ; 26	FUJ; 24	SUZ; 20	SUG; 16	AUT; 21	MOT; 22		NC	0
2024	R'Qs Motor Sports	Mercedes-AMG GT3 EVO 2020	GT300	OKA	FUJ; 25	SUZ; 24	FUJ	SUG; 19	AUT	MOT; 20	SUZ		NC	0
2025	R'Qs Motor Sports	Mercedes-AMG GT3 EVO 2020	GT300	OKA	FUJ; 20	SEP	FS1 (23)	FS2; 25	SUZ	SUG	AUT; 19	MOT	NC	0
2026	R'Qs Motor Sports	Mercedes-AMG GT3 EVO 2020	GT300	OKA	FUJ; 20	FUJ	SUZ	SUG	AUT	MOT; 21	MOT		NC	0

* Season still in progress.
