= Hideki Mutoh =

Japanese racing driver (born 1982)

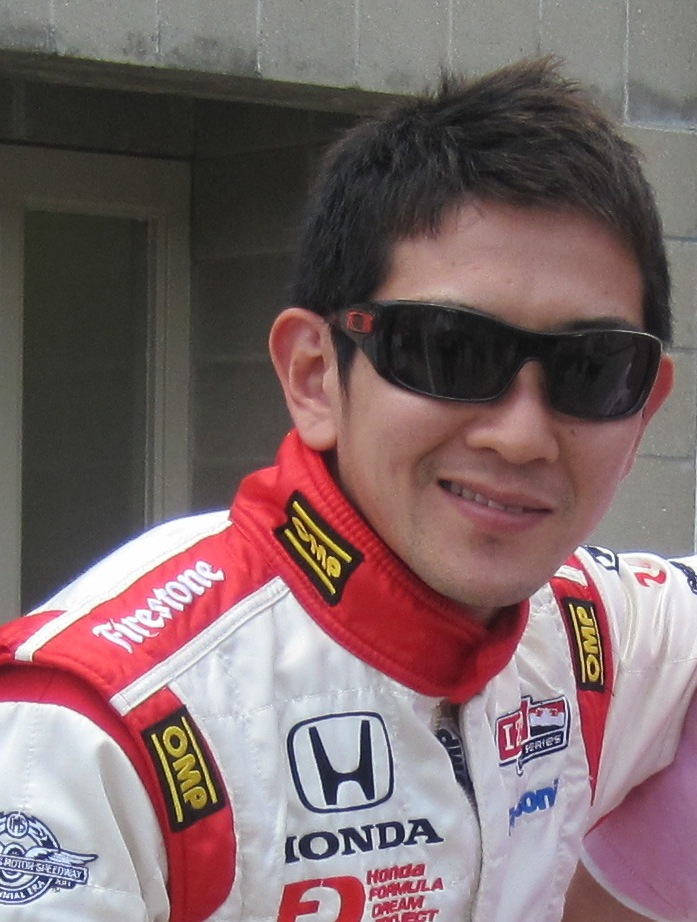
- Mutoh at the Indianapolis Motor Speedway in 2010
- Nationality: Japanese
- Born: October 6, 1982 (age 44) Tokyo, Japan

Super GT career
- Debut season: 2006
- Car number: 55
- Former teams: Nakajima Racing, Team Mugen, Team Kunimitsu, Real Racing, Autobacs Racing Team Aguri
- Starts: 83
- Wins: 3
- Poles: 3
- Fastest laps: 0
- Best finish: 1st in 2013

Previous series
- 2003–2004 2006, 2011 2007 2008-2011 2012-2013 2013-2014: Japan Formula 3 Formula Nippon; Indy Pro Series; IndyCar Series; Super GT GT300; Super Formula

Championship titles
- 2013 2002: Super GT - GT300; Formula Dream

Awards
- 2008: IndyCar Series Rookie of the Year

Hideki Mutoh (武藤 英紀, Mutō Hideki; born October 6, 1982) is a Japanese race car driver from Tokyo who last raced in the 2022 Super GT Season for Autobacs Racing Team Aguri.

== Career ==
=== Profile ===
Mutoh is 172 cm (5 ft 8 in) tall and weighs 64 kg (141 lb). His blood type is AB Rh-positive. His hobbies include tennis, driving, and darts. He drives a Honda CR-V. He has two older sisters. He was expected to inherit his family's seafood wholesale business, Hotei Tora (布袋寅), in Tsukiji, becoming the sixth generation owner, but instead chose to become a race car driver. Upon returning from the UK without sufficient funds, he borrowed money from his grandfather, Kazuyori Mutoh (武藤和順), the fourth-generation owner of Hotei Tora, after writing an IOU.

=== History ===
Mutoh began karting at the age of twelve in 1995. In 1997, he won the East Series of the Karting Kanto Championship. The following day after graduating junior high school in 1998, he went to study in England. He made his racing debut in 1999, competing in Formula Vauxhall Junior Winter Series. In 2000, he competed in the British Formula Ford, finishing ninth in the series and seventh in the Formula Ford Festival. In 2001, he again finished ninth in the British Formula Ford series, and also finished third in the Formula Ford European Championship. He returned to Asia in 2002 to compete in Asian Formula 2000 and Formula Dream, where he finished second in the Formula Dream series in his rookie season. He won the Formula Dream championship in 2003.

In 2004, Mutoh moved to the Japan Formula 3, finishing ninth in the series. In 2005, he finished third in the Japan Formula 3 championship. In 2006, he drove in Formula Nippon and Super GT 500–class for Nakajima Racing. He achieved his first Super GT victory in the final round at Fuji Speedway, starting from pole position. He also recorded the fastest lap in the seventh round of Formula Nippon at Sportsland SUGO.

=== 2007 ===
In 2007, Autobacs Racing Team Aguri (ARTA) announced that Mutoh had been signed to drive their new entry in the Indy Pro Series in a car prepared by Panther Racing, who had last competed in IPS in 2003, winning the championship with driver Mark Taylor. Mutoh captured his first win in Liberty Challenge Race 1 at the Indianapolis Motor Speedway road course on United States Grand Prix weekend, starting from pole position. He went on to win another race at Kentucky Speedway and finished second in the championship standings, earning Rookie of the Year honors.

On September 9, Mutoh made his Indy Racing League IndyCar Series debut with Panther Racing at Chicagoland Speedway in the Peak Antifreeze Indy 300 in the one-off entry No. 60 car, sponsored by the Formula Dream Project. Mutoh finished eighth and clocked the fastest lap of the race despite it being his debut. On October 31, 2007, it was announced Mutoh would replace 2007 IndyCar Series champion Dario Franchitti at Andretti Green Racing in the team's full-time No. 27 IndyCar for 2008.

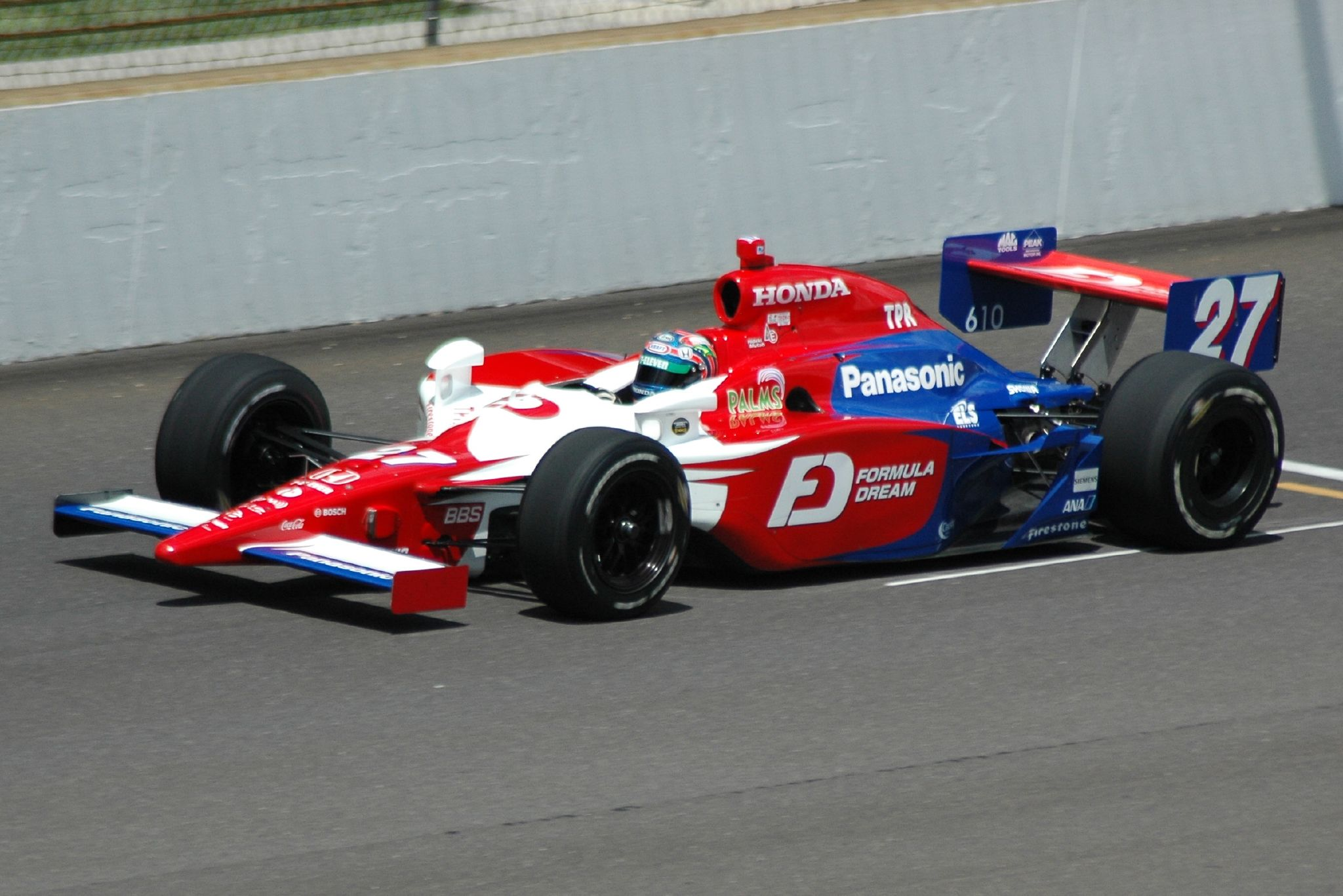
Mutoh practicing for the 2008 Indianapolis 500.

=== 2008 ===
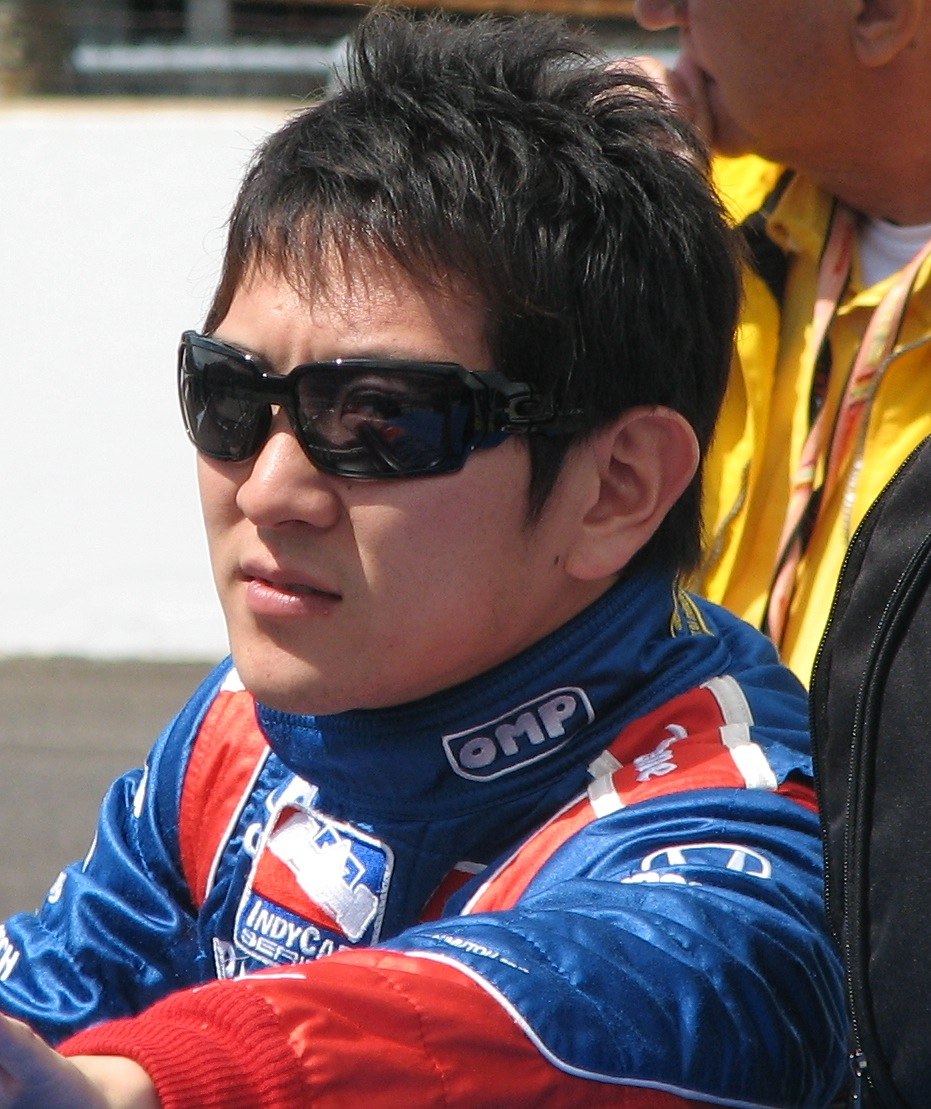
Mutoh at the Indianapolis Motor Speedway in 2009.

Mutoh made his debut for Andretti Green Racing at Homestead-Miami Speedway in March and in May was the highest qualifying rookie for the 2008 Indianapolis 500, starting from ninth. He finished seventh in the race, the second best finishing position for a Japanese driver in the history of the race. He was also the highest finishing rookie in the race, but the Rookie of the Year award for the race was given to Ryan Hunter-Reay.

Mutoh scored his best finish of his IndyCar Series career in June at the Iowa Speedway, finishing second to Dan Wheldon, setting a new mark for best IndyCar finish by a Japanese driver, surpassing the third place of Tora Takagi at Texas Motor Speedway in 2003. He failed to finish higher than sixth in the remainder of the season, but beat transitional driver Justin Wilson to the Rookie of the Year title and tenth place overall in the series. He was also awarded the "Fastest Rookie of the Year" award.

=== 2009 ===
Mutoh continued with Andretti Green Racing for the 2009 IndyCar Series season. The start of the season was marked by misfortune and mechanical issues. For the 2009 Indianapolis 500, his second attempt, he qualified in sixteenth position. During the race, he demonstrated a pace comparable to the leading drivers, improving his position. However, slower pit stops hampered his progress, and he ultimately finished in tenth place out of twenty finishers. His best result of the season came at Iowa Speedway, where he finished third, securing his second consecutive podium finish at the track. At Richmond International Raceway, he led 74 laps, his first time leading laps in the IndyCar Series, and finished fourth. He also achieved two fifth-place finishes on road courses, at Mid-Ohio and Sonoma. He finished the season eleventh in the points standings, just one point behind ninth place.

=== 2010 ===
Mutoh participated in the 2010 IndyCar Series season with Newman/Haas Racing. Despite showing flashes of speed, he struggled to achieve consistent results. At the Kansas Speedway race, he qualified a season-best fourth and was running in a podium position towards the end of the race. However, on a restart with fourteen laps remaining, Mutoh, running fifth, made contact with Takuma Sato, who was in sixth, resulting in both drivers retiring. At the Indianapolis 500, he qualified ninth, matching his 2008 effort, but retired from the race due to handling issues. He ultimately finished eighteenth in the final point standings without achieving a top-ten finish, with a best result of twelfth.

=== 2011 ===
Mutoh has been announced as an Aguri Suzuki Honda driver in the Super GT series in Japan for 2011, alongside Takashi Kobayashi.

On September 1, Mutoh confirmed he would be part of the 2011 Indy Japan: The Final race at Motegi to drive No. 17 for Sam Schmidt Motorsports/AFS Racing. Mutoh finished nineteenth on the lead lap.

== Motorsports career results ==
=== Complete Formula Nippon/Super Formula results ===
(key)

Year	Team	Engine	1	2	3	4	5	6	7	8	9	DC	Points
2006	Nakajima Racing	Honda	FUJ; 19	SUZ; 6	MOT; 8	SUZ; Ret	AUT; 17	FUJ; 16	SUG; 10	MOT; 10	SUZ; Ret	14th	1
2011	Real Racing	Honda	SUZ	AUT	FUJ	MOT; 10	SUZ	SUG	MOT1; Ret	MOT2; 9		15th	0
2013	Docomo Team Dandelion Racing	Honda	SUZ; 13	AUT; Ret	FUJ; 13	MOT; 12	SUG; 10	SUZ1; 12	SUZ2; 10			20th	0
2014	Docomo Team Dandelion Racing	Honda	SUZ; 10	FUJ1; 10	FUJ2; 12	FUJ; 11	MOT; 5	AUT; 10	SUG; 12	SUZ1; 13	SUZ2; 12	15th	4

=== Complete Super GT results ===
Year	Team	Car	Class	1	2	3	4	5	6	7	8	9	DC	Points
2006	Nakajima Racing	Honda NSX	GT500	SUZ; 15	OKA; Ret	FUJ; 7	SEP; 9	SUG; 5	SUZ; 4	MOT; 8	AUT; 12	FUJ; 1	11th	51
2011	Autobacs Racing Team Aguri	Honda HSV-010 GT	GT500	OKA; 9	FUJ; 12	SEP; 9	SUG; 10	SUZ; 9	FUJ; 14	AUT; 12	MOT; 13		15th	7
2012	Team Mugen	Honda CR-Z	GT300	OKA	FUJ	SEP	SUG; 16	SUZ; 11	FUJ; 3	AUT; 10	MOT; 11		15th	12
2013	Team Mugen	Honda CR-Z	GT300	OKA; 7	FUJ; 2	SEP; 2	SUG; 2	SUZ; 5	FUJ; 8	FUJ; 1	AUT; 9	MOT; 2	1st	85
2014	Team Kunimitsu	Honda NSX-GT	GT500	OKA; 9	FUJ; Ret	AUT; 6	SUG; 11	FUJ; 7	SUZ; 6	BUR; 8	MOT; 8		14th	23
2015	Keihin Real Racing	Honda NSX-GT	GT500	OKA; 12	FUJ; 4	CHA; 3	FUJ; 8	SUZ; Ret	SUG; 8	AUT; 3	MOT; 8		8th	39
2016	Drago Modulo Honda Racing	Honda NSX-GT	GT500	OKA; 12	FUJ; 13	SUG; 7	FUJ; Ret	**SUZ**; Ret	CHA; 2	MOT; 12	MOT; 15		13th	20
2017	Team Mugen	Honda NSX-GT	GT500	OKA; 9	FUJ; 15	AUT; 11	SUG; 6	FUJ; Ret	SUZ; 12	CHA; 13	MOT; 11		18th	7
2018	Team Mugen	Honda NSX-GT	GT500	OKA; 10	FUJ; 14	SUZ; Ret	**CHA**; 5	FUJ; 14	SUG; 4	AUT; 14	MOT; 14		15th	16
2019	Team Mugen	Honda NSX-GT	GT500	OKA; 7‡	FUJ; 11	SUZ; 12	CHA; Ret	FUJ; 6	AUT; 14	SUG; 9	MOT; 9		15th	12
2020	Team Mugen	Honda NSX-GT	GT500	FUJ; 12	FUJ; 10	SUZ; Ret	MOT; 3	FUJ; 6	SUZ; 13	MOT; 4	FUJ; 12		15th	25
2021	Team Kunimitsu	Honda NSX-GT	GT500	OKA; 8	FUJ; 4	MOT	SUZ	SUG	AUT	MOT	FUJ		19th	11
2022	Autobacs Racing Team Aguri	Honda NSX GT3 Evo22	GT300	OKA; 15	FUJ; Ret	SUZ; 10	FUJ; Ret	SUZ; 24	SUG; 7	AUT; 18	**MOT**; 1		12th	26

^{‡} Half points awarded as less than 75% of race distance was completed.

=== American open–wheel racing results ===
(key) (Races in bold indicate pole position)

==== Indy Lights ====
Year	Team	1	2	3	4	5	6	7	8	9	10	11	12	13	14	15	16	Rank	Points	Ref
2007	Super Aguri Panther Racing	HMS; 3	STP1; 2	STP2; 4	INDY; 5	MIL; Ret	**IMS1**; 1	IMS2; 3	IOW; 3	WGL1; 2	WGL2; 6	NSH; 6	MOH; 5	**KTY**; 1	SNM1; 19	SNM2; 10	CHI	**2nd**	**481**	

==== IndyCar Series ====
Year	Team	No.	Chassis	Engine	1	2	3	4	5	6	7	8	9	10	11	12	13	14	15	16	17	18	19	Rank	Points	Ref
2007	Panther Racing	60	Dallara IR-05	Honda HI7R V8	HMS	STP	MOT	KAN	INDY	MIL	TXS	IOW	RIR	WGL	NSH	MOH	MIS	KTY	SNM	DET	CHI; 8			25th	24	
2008	Andretti Green Racing	27	Dallara IR-05	Honda HI7R V8	HMS; 24	STP; 6	MOT^{1} 11	LBH^{1} DNP	KAN; 6	INDY; 7	MIL; 12	TXS; 6	IOW; 2	RIR; 13	WGL; 9	NSH; 14	MOH; 9	EDM; 27	KTY; 18	SNM; 13	DET; 11	CHI; 22	SRF^{2} 8	10th	346	
2009	Andretti Green Racing	27	Dallara IR-05	Honda HI7R V8	STP; 15	LBH; 20	KAN; 8	INDY; 10	MIL; 8	TXS; 21	IOW; 3	RIR; 4	WGL; 18	TOR; 12	EDM; 14	KTY; 13	MOH; 5	SNM; 5	CHI; 23	MOT; 14	HMS; 6			11th	353	
2010	Newman/Haas Racing	06	Dallara IR-05	Honda HI7R V8	SAO; 20	STP; 14	ALA; 15	LBH; 13	KAN; 23	INDY; 28	TXS; 12	IOW; 20	WGL; 12	TOR; 12	EDM; 17	MOH; 18	SNM; 17	CHI; 13	KTY; 17	MOT; 14	HMS; 20			18th	250	
2011	Sam Schmidt Motorsports AFS Racing	17	Dallara IR-05	Honda HI7R V8	STP	ALA	LBH	SAO	INDY	TXS1	TXS2	MIL	IOW	TOR	EDM	MOH	NHM	SNM	BAL	MOT; 18	KTY	LVS		43rd	12	

^{1} Run on same day.
^{2} Non-points race.

Years	Teams	Races	Poles	Wins	Podiums (Non-win)**	Top 10s (Non-podium)***	Indianapolis 500 Wins	Championships
5	4	54	0	0	2	15	0	0

** Podium (Non-win) indicates 2nd or 3rd place finishes.
*** Top 10s (Non-podium) indicates 4th through 10th place finishes.

==== Indianapolis 500 ====
Year	Chassis	Engine	Start	Finish	Team	Note
2008	Dallara	Honda	9	7	Andretti Green	Fastest rookie qualifier 2nd best rookie finisher
2009	Dallara	Honda	16	10	Andretti Green	Completed every lap
2010	Dallara	Honda	9	28	Newman/Haas Racing	Completed 76 laps

Sporting positions
Preceded by Ryan Hunter-Reay	IndyCar Series Rookie of the Year; 2008	Succeeded by Raphael Matos
