= Kazuho Takahashi =

Japanese businessman and amateur racing driver

- Nationality: Japanese
- Born: 18 January 1953 (age 73) Aichi Prefecture, Japan

Previous series
- 2001–19: Super GT
24 Hours of Le Mans career
- Years: 2008
- Teams: Terramos
- Best finish: NC (2008)
- Class wins: 0

Kazuho Takahashi (高橋 一穂, Takahashi Kazuho; born 18 January 1953) is a Japanese businessman and semi-retired amateur racing driver. He is the CEO, president and founder of VT Holdings and Honda Cars Tokai, a chain of Honda dealerships found across Aichi Prefecture.

== Racing career ==
Takahashi's first known form of racing was in 1994 in the Tokachi 24 Hours; he would race intermittently in that series, last competing in that series in 2001. Takahashi also competed in two editions of the Suzuka 1000 km as a privateer; it was around 1998 when he started Cars Tokai Dream28 as the racing arm of his family of dealerships.

Takahashi first competed in what was then known as the All Japan Grand Touring Car Championship in 2001; being a Honda-based team thanks to his dealerships he would drive a Honda NSX. Initially paired up with Hiroshi Kimura, for 2002 he would pair up with Akira Watanabe. The team switched from a Honda NSX to a Vemac RD320R in 2005, the series now being known as Super GT.

2006 would see Takahashi with a new teammate, Hiroki Katoh, and a new car, the Mooncraft Shiden. 2006 and 2007 were both strong years for the team, achieving wins and podiums; both years would have the team fighting for the Drivers's and Constructors's championships at the end of the year. Despite tying with other teams in points, Cars Tokai Dream28 would lose both the 2006 and 2007 Drivers's Championships on countback, although they would win the 2007 Constructors's Championship.

Takahashi retired from full-time competition after the 2019 Super GT Series but vowed to continue racing in other categories.

== Racing record ==
=== Complete Super GT results ===
(key) (Races in bold indicate pole position) (Races in italics indicate fastest lap)

Year	Team	Car	Class	1	2	3	4	5	6	7	8	9	DC	Points
2001	Verno Tokai Dream28	Honda NSX	GT300	TAI	FUJ	SUG	FUJ	MOT; 13	SUZ; 13	MIN			NC	0
2002	Verno Tokai Dream28	Honda NSX	GT300	TAI; 9	FUJ; 14	SUG; 4	SEP; 8	FUJ; 10	MOT; Ret	MIN; Ret	SUZ; 9		16th	22
2003	Verno Tokai Dream28	Honda NSX	GT300	TAI; 5	FUJ; Ret	SUG; 5	FUJ; 21	FUJ; 9	MOT; 19	AUT; 13	SUZ; 8		14th	22
2004	Verno Tokai Dream28	Honda NSX	GT300	TAI; 18	SUG; Ret	SEP; 17	TOK; 17	MOT; 14	AUT; 20	SUZ; 22			NC	0
2005	Verno Tokai Dream28	Vemac RD320R	GT300	OKA; 14	FUJ; 13	SEP; 14	SUG; 9	MOT; 6	FUJ; Ret	AUT; 14	SUZ; 6		14th	12
2006	Cars Tokai Dream28	Mooncraft Shiden	GT300	SUZ; 6	OKA; 11	**FUJ**; 4	**SEP**; 4	SUG; 3	SUZ; 5	MOT; 21	**AUT**; 1	FUJ; 12	**2nd**	**89**
2007	Cars Tokai Dream28	Mooncraft Shiden	GT300	SUZ; 2	**OKA**; 2	FUJ; 5	SEP; 11	**SUG**; 4	**SUZ**; 1	MOT; 6	AUT; 10	FUJ; 3	**2nd**	**89**
2008	Cars Tokai Dream28	Mooncraft Shiden	GT300	**SUZ**; 2	OKA; 9	FUJ; 3	SEP; 5	SUG; 10	SUZ; Ret	MOT; 2	AUT; 3	FUJ; 11	4th	68
2009	Cars Tokai Dream28	Mooncraft Shiden	GT300	OKA; 6	SUZ	FUJ	SEP	SUG	SUZ	FUJ	AUT	MOT	20th	5
2010	Cars Tokai Dream28	Mooncraft Shiden	GT300	SUZ	OKA	FUJ	SEP	SUG	SUZ; 18	FUJ	MOT		NC	0
2011	Cars Tokai Dream28	Mooncraft Shiden	GT300	OKA; 7	FUJ; Ret	SEP; 10	SUG; 13	SUZ; 6	FUJ; 3	AUT; 4	MOT; 8		10th	32
2012	Cars Tokai Dream28	Mooncraft Shiden	GT300	OKA; 7	FUJ; 2	SEP; DNS	SUG; Ret	SUZ; 15	FUJ; 13	AUT; DNQ	MOT; 16		11th	25
2013	Cars Tokai Dream28	McLaren MP4-12C GT3	GT300	OKA; Ret	FUJ; 18	SEP; 15	SUG; 16	SUZ; 18	FUJ; 14	FUJ; 5	AUT; 11	MOT; 17	25th	3
2014	Cars Tokai Dream28	McLaren MP4-12C GT3	GT300	OKA; 14	FUJ; 7	AUT; 13	SUG; 21	FUJ; 12	SUZ; 12	CHA; 15	MOT; 19		33rd	4
2015	Cars Tokai Dream28	Lotus Evora MC GT300	GT300	OKA; 16	FUJ; Ret	CHA; 11	FUJ; 22	**SUZ**; 7	SUG; Ret	**AUT**; 21	MOT; 13		24th	5
2016	Cars Tokai Dream28	Lotus Evora MC GT300	GT300	OKA; 17	FUJ; 13	SUG; 23	FUJ; Ret	SUZ; Ret	CHA; DNS	MOT; 19	MOT; Ret		NC	0
2017	Cars Tokai Dream28	Lotus Evora MC GT300	GT300	OKA; 26	FUJ; 22	AUT; 24	SUG; Ret	FUJ; 24	SUZ; 23	CHA; 20	MOT; Ret		NC	0
2018	Cars Tokai Dream28	Lotus Evora MC GT300	GT300	OKA; 23	FUJ; 23	SUZ; 13	CHA; 12	FUJ; 20	SUG; Ret	AUT; 21	MOT; 22		NC	0
2019	Cars Tokai Dream28	Lotus Evora MC GT300	GT300	OKA; 14	FUJ; 23	SUZ; 23	CHA; 21	FUJ; 12	AUT; 23	SUG; 17	MOT; 29		NC	0

=== 24 Hours of Le Mans results ===
Year	Team	Co-Drivers	Car	Class	Laps	Pos.	Class Pos.
2008	(Japan) Terramos	(Japan) Yojiro Terada (Japan) Hiroki Katoh	Courage LC70	LMP1	224	NC	NC
