= Tomonobu Fujii =

Japanese racing driver (born 1980)

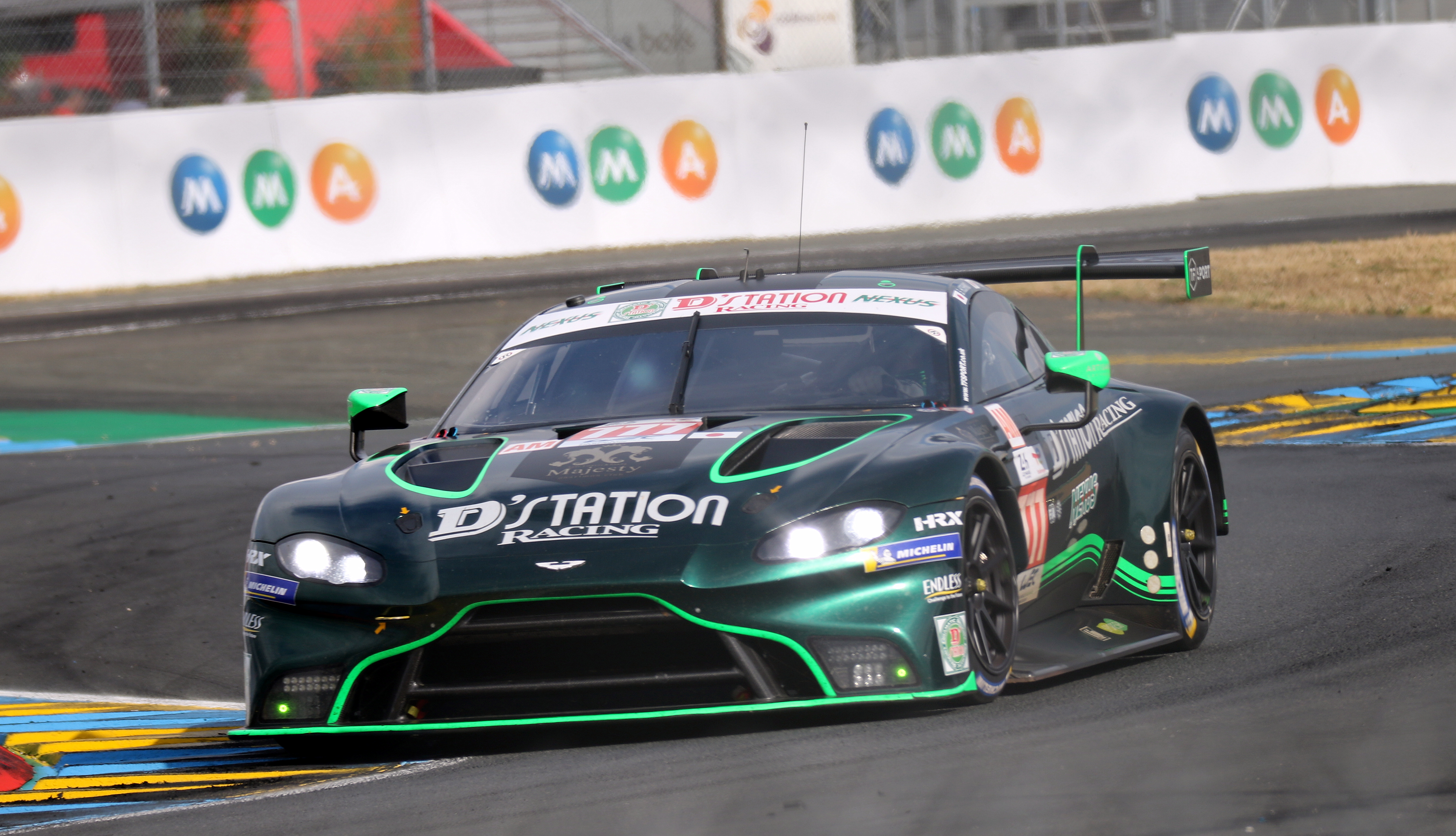
- Fujii at the 2023 24 Hours of Le Mans
- Nationality: Japanese
- Born: 17 December 1980 (age 45) Tokyo
- Categorisation: FIA Gold

Championship titles
- 2006 2007 2007 2011 2012: All Japan Endurance Championship, LMP2 Class; SuperTaikyu, ST1 Class; All Japan Endurance Championship, LMGT1 Class; SuperTaikyu, ST-X Class; SuperGT Jaf Grand Prix, GT300 Class

Tomonobu Fujii (藤井 誠暢, Fujii Tomonobu; born 17 December 1980, in Tokyo) is a Japanese racing driver.

== Racing Kart / Formula race ==
Fujii entered the second-hand Racing Kart in 1994 and made his debut in local races when he was 13 years old. He won the championship right away and continued to display his talent in local races. He continued to achieve many victories won the Series Championships twice. He stepped up to Formula races soon after, that but was forced to suspend his participation in the races due to lack of funds. Fujii went to seek sponsors in this one year of interval. He then participated in Japan Formula 4 in 2002 where he won two victories in a year and obtained second championship as well as MVP. Fujii received a scholarship and participated in Formula Dream by HONDA for two years from 2003. He accumulated more experience, eventually winning the fourth series championship in 2004.

== Super GT ==
Fujii made his debut in Super GT, which is the top category in Japan, in 2005. Once he started to race with a Nissan 350Z, he reached the podium four times and won the fourth position in 2006. He won his first championship in the opening race of Super GT in 2007 and competed for the Series Championship. He then received a contract with NISMO as a factory driver in 2008, although he continued to race with a Nissan 350Z in Super GT till 2008. He obtained fifth place in 2007 and 2008. From 2010 to 2013, he contracted with Hankook as a factory driver and raced with a Porsche GT3R (RSR) during that four years. He reached 3rd Series in 2011 and 2nd Series in 2012. He has been racing with an Audi R8 LMS Ultra since 2014.

== Super GT / JAF Grand Prix Fuji Sprint Cup ==
Fujii obtained third place with a Porsche GT3R in 2010, second place in 2011, and he won the championship in 2012 in the JAF Grand Prix Fuji Sprint Cup held at Fuji Speedway.

== Endurance race ==
Fujii has been participating in the Super Taikyu race along with the Super GT in Japan for many years. He raced with Nissan a 350Z from 2006 to 2009 and won the Series Championship in 2007. He won the victory as a development driver of a Nissan 370Z NISMO RC in 2010. He won three victories with an Audi R8 LMS in 2011 and won the Series Championship for the GT3 Class. He raced with a Nissan GT-R NISMO GT3 from 2012 to 2014. Fujii also joined the All Japan Endurance Championship held in Japan in both 2006 and 2007. He won the Series Championship in the LMP2 class in 2006 and in the LMGT1 class with a Ferrari 550 GT1 in 2007.

Fujii also has experience in overseas races, mainly participating in craft racing in Hong Kong with an Aston Martin Vantage GT3. He has participated in the Asian Lemans, Merdeka Millennium Endurance Race, and the Dubai 24Hrs race. He achieved third place in Dubai 24Hrs in 2013. He has also placed 53rd in the Rolex 24 AT Daytona 2015, driving with Flying Lizard Motorsports.

== Racing Record ==
=== Super GT results ===
(key) (Races in bold indicate pole position) (Races in italics indicate fastest lap)

Year	Team	Car	Class	1	2	3	4	5	6	7	8	9	DC	Pts
2005	MOLA	Nissan 350Z	GT300	OKA; 15	FUJ; 10	SEP; 17	SUG; 17	MOT; 15	FUJ; Ret	AUT; 9	SUZ; 15		18th	3
2006	ENDLESS SPORTS	Nissan 350Z	GT300	SUZ; 16	OKA; 4	FUJ; 13	SEP; 18	SUG; 2	SUZ; 16	MOT; 2	AUT; 11	FUJ; 3	4th	62
2007	ENDLESS SPORTS	Nissan 350Z	GT300	SUZ; 1	OKA; 7	FUJ; 4	SEP; 6	SUG; 12	SUZ; 5	MOT; 23	AUT; 3	FUJ; 5	5th	59
2008	TEAM DAISHIN	Nissan 350Z	GT300	SUZ; 4	OKA; 6	FUJ; 5	SEP; 10	SUG; 2	SUZ; 6	MOT; 11	AUT; 1	FUJ; 7	5th	62
2009	TEAM DAISHIN	Ferrari F430GT	GT300	OKA; 12	SUZ; 6	FUJ; 2	SEP; DNS	SUG; 4	SUZ; 8	FUJ; 1	AUT; 18	MOT; 1	4th	71
2010	HANKOOK KTR	Porsche 911 GT3RSR	GT300	SUZ	OKA	**FUJ**; Ret	SEP	SUG		FUJ; C	MOT		NC	0
2010	A speed	Aston Martin Vantage GT2	GT300						SUZ; Ret				NC	0
2011	HANKOOK KTR	Porsche 911 GT3R	GT300	OKA; 14	FUJ; 1	SEP; 9	SUG; 5	SUZ; 2	FUJ; 11	AUT; 17	MOT; 2		**3rd**	**58**
2012	HANKOOK KTR	Porsche 911 GT3R	GT300	OKA; 5	FUJ; Ret	SEP; 1	SUG; 4	SUZ; 6	FUJ; 1	AUT; 3	MOT; 7		**2nd**	**75**
2013	HANKOOK KTR	Porsche 911 GT3R	GT300	OKA; 8	FUJ; 16	SEP; Ret	SUG; 17	SUZ; 10	FUJ; 15	FUJ	AUT; 5	MOT; 11	19th	11
2014	Audi Team Hitotsuyama	Audi R8 LMS ultra	GT300	OKA; 8	FUJ; 14	AUT; 18	SUG; 3	FUJ; 23	SUZ; Ret	BUR; Ret	MOT; 4		14th	22
2015	Audi Team Hitotsuyama	Audi R8 LMS ultra	GT300	OKA; 3	FUJ; Ret	CHA; 19	FUJ; 20	SUZ; 5	SUG; 13	AUT; 5	MOT; 8		13th	28
2016	Audi Team Hitotsuyama	Audi R8 LMS ultra	GT300	OKA; 7	FUJ; 7	SUG; Ret	FUJ; 2	SUZ; 6	CHA; 24	MOT; 1	MOT; 4		3rd	57
2017	D'station Racing	Porsche 911 GT3	GT300	OKA; 9	FUJ; 3	AUT; 7	SUG; 15	FUJ; 8	SUZ; 10	CHA; 3	MOT; 9		7th	35
2018	D'station Racing	Porsche 911 GT3	GT300	OKA; 2	FUJ; 6	SUZ; 11	CHA; 8	FUJ; 7	SUG; 12	AUT; 8	MOT; 7		9th	35
2019	D'station Racing AMR	Aston Martin Vantage AMR GT3	GT300	OKA; Ret	FUJ; 27	SUZ; Ret	CHA; 19	FUJ; 11	AUT; 18	SUG; 24	MOT; 17		NC	0
2020	Pacific – D'station Racing AMR	Aston Martin Vantage AMR GT3	GT300	FUJ; 10	FUJ; 19	SUZ; 10	MOT; 18	FUJ; 24	SUZ; 24	MOT; 25	FUJ; 5		21st	8
2024	D'station Racing	Aston Martin Vantage AMR GT3 Evo	GT300	OKA; 19	FUJ; 16	**SUZ**; 1^{1}	FUJ; 4	SUG; 3^{3}	AUT; 5^{3}	MOT; 6	SUZ; 6		4th	59
2025	D'station Racing	Aston Martin Vantage AMR GT3 Evo	GT300	OKA; 24	**FUJ**; 2	SEP; 6	FS1 (1)	**FS2**; 1	SUZ; 24	SUG; Ret	AUT; 21	MOT; 12	12th	60.5
2026	D'station Racing	Aston Martin Vantage AMR GT3 Evo	GT300	**OKA**; 1	FUJ; 7	FUJ; 24	SUZ; 4	SUG; 21	AUT; 20	MOT	MOT		12th	48

^{‡} Half points awarded as less than 75% of race distance was completed.
^{(Number)} Driver did not take part in this sprint race, points are still awarded for the teammate's result.
^{*} Season still in progress.

=== 24 Hours of Dubai results ===
(key) (Races in bold indicate pole position) (Races in italics indicate fastest lap)

Year	Team	Co-Drivers	Car	Class	ClassPos.
2013	(Hong Kong) Craft Racing AMR	(Hong Kong) Frank Yu (Hong Kong) Darryl O'Young (United Kingdom) Darren Turner (Germany) Stefan Mücke	Aston Martin Vantage GT3	A6-Pro	3rd
2014	(Hong Kong) Craft Racing AMR	(Germany) Stefan Mücke (United Kingdom) Darren Turner (Hong Kong) Darryl O'Young	Aston Martin Vantage GT3	A6-Pro	DNF

=== 24 Hours of Daytona results ===
(key) (Races in bold indicate pole position) (Races in italics indicate fastest lap)

Year	Team	Co-Drivers	Car	Class	ClassPos.
2015	(United States) Flying Lizard Motorsports	(Germany) Markus Winkelhock (United States) Robert Thorne (Japan) Satoshi Hoshino	Audi R8 LMS	GTD	10th

=== Complete 24 Hours of Le Mans results ===
Year	Team	Co-Drivers	Car	Class	Laps	Pos.	Class Pos.
2021	(Japan) D'station Racing	(United Kingdom) Andrew Watson (Japan) Satoshi Hoshino	Aston Martin Vantage AMR	GTE; Am	333	33rd	6th
2022	(Japan) D'station Racing	(United Kingdom) Charlie Fagg (Japan) Satoshi Hoshino	Aston Martin Vantage AMR	GTE; Am	112	DNF	DNF
2023	(Japan) D'station Racing	(Japan) Satoshi Hoshino (United Kingdom) Casper Stevenson	Aston Martin Vantage AMR	GTE; Am	163	DNF	DNF

=== Complete FIA World Endurance Championship results ===
(key) (Races in bold indicate pole position) (Races in italics indicate fastest lap)

Year	Entrant	Class	Car	Engine	1	2	3	4	5	6	7	Rank	Pts
2021	D'station Racing	LMGTE Am	Aston Martin Vantage AMR	Aston Martin 4.0 L Turbo V8	SPA; 7	ALG; Ret	MNZ; 3	LMS; 5	BHR; 10	BHR; 7		9th	51
2022	D'station Racing	LMGTE Am	Aston Martin Vantage AMR	Aston Martin 4.0 L Turbo V8	SEB; 6	SPA; 7	LMS; Ret	MNZ; 11	FUJ; 3	BHR; 10		14th	35
2023	D'Station Racing	LMGTE Am	Aston Martin Vantage AMR	Aston Martin 4.0 L Turbo V8	SEB; 10	PRT; NC	SPA; 10	LMS; Ret	MNZ; Ret	FUJ; 10	BHR; 2	14th	31

^{*} Season still in progress.
