= Igor Sushko =

- Born: January 10, 1986 (age 40)

Igor Sushko (born 10 January 1986) is a Ukrainian former racing driver who last competed in the 2013 Super GT Series with Apr. He is also known for microblogging about the Ukraine War. He translated emails purportedly between an FSB agent and Vladimir Osechkin, and shared the e-mails with Newsweek.

== Early life ==
Sushko moved from Ukraine to Kyoto, Japan when he was five years old, then to Tsukuba. He later moved to Lexington, Kentucky, and started the website AutomotiveForums.com at age fourteen.

== Racing career ==
He first competed in the 2006 GT World Challenge America series, under the number 69. He started the Long Beach race in the twenty-fourth position, and finished in seventeenth.

In 2009, his team – which included Michito Kamizumi, Yoshihiro Ito, and Subaru Yamamoto – had a best result of thirteenth place.

== Microblogging ==
Vice accused Sushko of spreading misinformation in 2023. The publication pointed to Sushko's analysis of a Russian livestream as an example of the dangers of paid verification for social media accounts when the threat of a nuclear strike on Kyiv never materialized.

Based on his posts on X, Sushko has been quoted by L'Indépendant and El Mundo as an analyst of the Russo-Ukraine War. His posts have also been used in news reporting from The Toronto Sun, The Peninsula, Milenio, Al Bawaba, and Business Insider.

In 2025, Sushko accused Sergio Gor of being a spy for Russia, posting a link to a New York Post article, as well as an investigation by Brian Krebs that was later retracted. Elon Musk responded to Sushko's posts directly, stating Gor had lied about his place of birth in federal documents.
