= 2006 24 Hours of Nürburgring =

Endurance motor race in Germany

2006 ADAC 24 Hours of Nürburgring

Seasons
- ← 2005 2007 →

Nürburgring 24h track (Nordschleife+GP Circuit without Mercedes-Arena)

The 2006 ADAC Zurich 24 Hours of Nürburgring was the 34th running of the 24 Hours of Nürburgring. It took place on June 18, 2006. Manthey Racing's #28 Porsche claimed honours in the SP7 class and was the overall victor, completing 151 laps over the 24 hours. Zakspeed Racing and their #33 Dodge Viper claimed third overall and finished as top runner in the SP8 GT3 class.

== Race results ==
Class winners in bold.

34. ADAC Zurich 24h Rennen
Pos	Class	No	Team	Drivers	Car	Laps
1	**SP7**	**28**	**(Germany) Manthey Racing GmbH**	**(Germany) Lucas Luhr (Germany) Timo Bernhard (Germany) Mike Rockenfeller (Germany) Marcel Tiemann**	**Porsche 911 GT3**	**151**
2	SP7	2	(Germany) H & R Spezialfedern GmbH & Co KG	(Germany) Jürgen Alzen (Germany) Uwe Alzen (Germany) Klaus Ludwig (Germany) Christian Abt	Porsche 997 GT3	151
3	**SP8**	**33**	**(Germany) Zakspeed Racing GmbH & Co. KG**	**(Germany) Hans-Peter Huppert-Nieder (Germany) Christopher Gerhard (Germany) Dirk Riebensahm (Germany) Werner Mohr**	**Dodge Viper GTS-R**	**142**
4	SP7	30	(Germany) Manthey Racing GmbH	(Belgium) Bert Lambrecht (Belgium) Jean-François Hemroulle (Belgium) Dirk Schoysman	Porsche 911 GT3	140
5	**S1**	**263**	**(Germany) Motorsport Arena Oschersleben**	**(Germany) Claudia Hürtgen (Germany) Marc Hennerici (Austria) Johannes Stuck (Germany) Torsten Schubert**	**BMW 120d**	**138**
6	SP7	42	(Germany) steam-racing GmbH	(Germany) Michael Schratz (Germany) Johannes Siegler (Germany) Arno Klasen (Germany) Jörg Viebahn	Porsche 996 GT3-RS	138
7	**SP6**	**69**		**(Germany) Rudi Adams (Germany) Rainer Dörr (Germany) Marc Hennerici (Germany) Gregor Vogler**	**BMW M3 CSL**	**137**
8	SP7	29	(Germany) Manthey Racing GmbH	(Germany) Gary Williams (United Kingdom) Julian Perry (Germany) Daniel Cooke (United Kingdom) Trevor Reeves	Porsche 911 GT3	137
9	SP7	24	(Australia) VIP Petfoods	(United Kingdom) Tony Quinn (Australia) Klark Quinn (New Zealand) Craig Baird (New Zealand) Kevin Bell	Porsche 996 GT3	137
10	SP6	61		(Germany) Wolf Silvester (United Kingdom) Tom Dill (United Kingdom) Matthew Marsh (Germany) Michael Bonk	Porsche 996 GT3	136
11	SP7	32		(Germany) Shane Fox (Germany) Wolfgang Weber (Germany) Lothar Diederich	Porsche GT3	136
12	**SP5**	**72**		**(Germany) Willi Obermann (Italy) Ivano Giuliani (Germany) Ulrich Gallade (Italy) Roberto Ragazzi**	**BMW M3**	**135**
13	**SP3**	**189**	**(Germany) Kissling Motorsport**	**(Germany) Stefan Kissling (Germany) Siegfried Sträwe (Germany) Rainer Bastuck (Germany) Volker Strycek**	**Opel Astra GTC**	**133**
14	SP3	137	(Germany) Kissling Motorsport	(Germany) Stefan Kissling (Finland) Hannu Luostarinen (Finland) Rauno Nuoramo (Germany) Wolfgang Haugg	Opel Astra GTC	133
15	SP3	146		(Germany) Kai Riemer (Germany) Jörg Chmiela (Germany) Franz Fabian (Germany) Peter Venn	Honda Civic Type R	125
16	SP7	11		(Germany) Jörg Otto (Germany) Georg Weiss (Germany) Peter-Paul Pietsch (United States) Michael Jacobs	Porsche GT3	133
17	SP6	65	(Germany) Team Ehrl Sport	(Germany) Marco Schelp (Switzerland) Marcel Blomer (Germany) Martin Baumgartner (Germany) Paul Waser	BMW M3 CSL	132
18	**SP4**	**94**	**(Germany) Team DMV**	**(Germany) Jürgen Schumann (Germany) Peter Schumann (Germany) Christian Hohenadel**	**Hyundai Coupé GK**	**132**
19	SP7	27		(United Kingdom) Bill Cameron (United Kingdom) Barry Horne (United Kingdom) Marino Franchitti	Porsche GT3	131
20	SP8	12	(Germany) Lambo-Racing GmbH	(Germany) Stephan Rösler (Germany) Andreas Kitzerow (Germany) Georg Silbermayr (Germany) Florian Scholze	Lamborghini Gallardo	131
21	**V5**	**214**	**(Germany) Bonnfinanz Motorsport**	**(Germany) Oliver Rövenich (Germany) Thomas Brügmann (Germany) Thomas Ambiel (Germany) René Wolff**	**BMW M3**	**130**
22	SP6	62	(Germany) MSC Rhön e.V. im AvD	(France) Pierre de Thoisy (France) Philippe Haezebrouck (France) Thierry Depoix	BMW M3	130
23	SP8	5		(Germany) Uwe Bleck (Germany) Timo Schupp (Germany) Christian Kohlhaas (Italy) Giampaolo Tenchini	Audi RS 4	130
24	SP8	8		(Germany) Wolfgang Schuhbauer (Germany) Horst von Saurma-Jeltsch (Germany) Ulrich Bez (United Kingdom) Chris Porritt	Aston Martin V8 Vantage	130
25	SP8	22		(Germany) Michael Tischner (Sweden) Ulf Karlsson (Germany) Joachim Kiesch (Germany) Klaus Engelbrecht-Schnür	BMW M3	129
26	SP6	59	(Germany) Raeder Motorsport GmbH	(Germany) Elgar Deegener (Germany) Sven Fisch (Germany) Jürgen Wohlfahrt (Germany) Bernd Schneider	Mitsubishi Lancer Evo VIII	129
27	SP6	52		(Switzerland) Peter Wyss (Germany) Meinhard Rittenmeier (Germany) Stefan Schlesack (Germany) Klaus Niedzwiedz	Honda NSX	128
28	SP7	46		(Italy) Francesco Ciani (Italy) Marco Polani (Italy) Giorgio Piodi (Italy) Giuliano Bottazzi	Porsche GT3	128
29	S1	245		(Germany) Kai Jordan (Germany) Ralph Bohnhorst (Germany) Sven Koch (Austria) Andreas Waldherr	Volkswagen Golf TDi	128
30	SP5	80		(Germany) Rudi Seher (Germany) Ronny Mai (Germany) Frank Jelinski (Germany) Werner Fischer	BMW Compact	128
31	SP7	25	(Germany) Agon Motorsport GbR	(Germany) Jörn Staade-Schmidt (Germany) Stefan Peters (Germany) Thomas Koll (Germany) Klaus Hahn	Porsche GT3	127
32	**V4**	**200**	**(Germany) Der Stern von Willich Motorsport**	**(Germany) Thomas Schmid (Germany) Lars Hieronymus (Germany) Carsten Welschar (Germany) Andreas Hoff**	**Mercedes-Benz 190 E Evo 1**	**126**
33	**SPC1**	**232**	**(Germany) VLN-Honda Junior Team-FH Köln Motorsport**	**(Germany) Christoph Breuer (Germany) Benjamin Koske (Germany) Demian Schaffert**	**Honda Civic Type R**	**126**
34	**SP3T**	**106**	**(Germany) Motorsportzentrum Rhein-Ruhr**	**(Finland) Jarkko Venäläinen (Germany) Andre Picker (Germany) Matthias Pahlke (Germany) Markus Mauer**	**SEAT León Supercopa**	**126**
35	SP7	66	(Germany) Kruse Motorsport	(Germany) Christopher Brück (Germany) Leonhard Schiller (Germany) Nicole Lütticke (Germany) Günter Lüttecke	Porsche GT3	126
36	SP8	9		(France) Jacques Laffite (United Kingdom) Richard Meaden (United States) Patrick Hong (Italy) Gianni Giudici	Maserati GranSport Light T	126
37	V4	196	(Germany) Team-Black-Falcon.com	(Germany) Thomas Mundorf (Germany) Dirk Baur (Germany) Christian Senz (Germany) Michael Rebhan	BMW 325i	125
38	V5	211	(Germany) Dürener Motorsport Club e.V. im ADAC	(Germany) Bernd Küpper (Germany) Klaus Koch (Germany) Benjamin Weidner	BMW M3	125
39	SP3	112		(Japan) Kotaro Yamamoto (Germany) Cyril Kalbassi (Germany) Oluf Bendixen	Honda Accord Euro R	122
40	V4	201	(Germany) Pistenclub e.V.	(Germany) Sascha Hancke (Germany) Jürgen Peter (Germany) Jörg Klinkhammer (Germany) Achim Berg	BMW M3	125
41	V4	207		(Germany) Johannes Reuter (Germany) Philipp Wlazik (Austria) Erich Trinkl (Germany) Karl-Heinz Wlazik	BMW 325i	125
42	V4	197	(Germany) Team-Black-Falcon.com	(Germany) Matthias Unger (Germany) Winfried Bär (Switzerland) Dieter Lehner (Germany) Heiko Heidemann	BMW 325i	124
43	V5	209	(Germany) Team-Black-Falcon.com	(Germany) Michael Luther (Germany) Daniel Zils (Germany) Alexander Böhm (Germany) Franz Brenauer	BMW M3 GT	123
44	**V2**	**111**		**(Germany) Jürgen Glath (Germany) Axel Nolde (Germany) Bojan Ferk**	**Opel Corsa**	**123**
45	SP3T	103	(Germany) Jörg van Ommen Autosport	(Germany) Dierk Möller Sonntag (Germany) Otto Hofmayer (Germany) Thorsten Unger (Germany) Hans-Martin Gass	Audi A3 2.0T FSI	123
46	SP6	49		(Luxembourg) Antoine Feidt (Germany) Michael Klein (France) Gérard Tremblay (France) Eric van de Vyver	BMW M3	123
47	V2	174		(Germany) Frank Möller (Germany) Alexander Schula (Germany) Jens Schäfer	BMW 318ti	123
48	S1	249		(Italy) Giuseppe Arlotti (Italy) Simone Stanguellini (Italy) Bruno Barbaro	SEAT León 1.9 TDi	123
49	SP3	128	(Germany) MSC Ruhr-Blitz Bochum e.V. im ADAC	(Italy) Gianni Biava (Italy) Emilio Melloni (Italy) Luca Zoppini (Italy) Giovanni Bottazzi	BMW 320i	122
50	SP3	134		(Germany) Michael Wellmann (Germany) Markus Leger (Germany) Uwe Reich (Germany) Patrick Hinte	Renault Clio RS	122
51	S1	257		(France) Franck Grossetéte (France) Philippe Géhin (France) Christophe Porcher	Renault Megane	122
52	S1	253		(Switzerland) Paul Hunsperger (Germany) Hubert Nacken (Germany) Terry Britschford (Germany) Roland Mühlbauer	Alfa Romeo 147 JTD	122
53	V5	213	(Germany) MSC Rhön e.V. im AvD	(Germany) Christian Leithauser (Germany) Ulli Rossaro (Germany) Torsten Krey (Germany) Florian Scholze	BMW M3 GT	121
54	SP3	110		(Germany) Christian Benz (Germany) Stefan Benz	Renault Clio RS	121
55	SPC1	233		(Germany) Michael Ecker (Germany) Uwe Unteroberdörster (Belgium) Marcel Engels (Germany) Wilfried Schmitz	Honda Civic Type R	120
56	SP6	64		(Sweden) Anders Levin (Sweden) Martin Morin (Sweden) Peter Thelin (Sweden) Carl Rydquist	Porsche GT3	120
57	V4	202		(Germany) Heinz-Willi Delzepich (Germany) Uwe Krumscheid (Germany) Matthias Ritgen (Germany) Andreas Krause	BMW 325i	119
58	SPC1	238	(Germany) Fleper Motorsport	(Germany) Norbert Bermes (Germany) Harald Thönnes (Germany) Daniel Ortmann (Germany) Meik Utsch	Honda Civic Type R	119
59	V4	199	(Germany) Harosa-Motorsport	(Germany) Hans-Rolf Salzer (Germany) Sascha Salzer	BMW M3	119
60	V2	183		(Germany) Markus Giese (Germany) Ralf Scheibner (Germany) Guido Majewski (Germany) Thilo Winkler	BMW 318is	119
61	V2	176		(Switzerland) Stefan Abegg (Switzerland) Benedikt Frei (Germany) Michael Jestädt (Germany) Hendrik Strauch	BMW 318ti	119
62	SP3T	105	(Germany) Motorsportzentrum Rhein-Ruhr	(Germany) Kathrin Droste (Germany) Katharina König (Germany) Catharina Felser (Switzerland) Christina Surer	SEAT León Supercopa	119
63	**SP1**	**165**		**(Germany) Christian Tschornia (Germany) Sebastian Tschornia (Germany) Guido Janzen (Germany) Martin Becker**	**Suzuki Swift**	**118**
64	**SP2**	**151**	**(Germany) Pistenclub e.V.**	**(Germany) Frank Aust (Germany) Rudolf Rank (Germany) Robert Thiele (Germany) Guy Hoffeld**	**Ford Fiesta**	**118**
65	SP3	130	(Germany) Kissling Motorsport	(Germany) Olaf Beckmann (Germany) Volker Strycek (Germany) Bernhard Schmittner (Germany) Peter Hass	Opel Manta B2	117
66	S1	251		(Germany) Heiko Hahn (Germany) Tom Robson (Germany) Kristian Vetter (Germany) Gregor Vogler	BMW 120d	117
67	V2	182		(Germany) Ralf Grass (Germany) Torsten Kratz (Germany) Ulrich Ehret (Germany) Peter Heckmann	BMW 318is	116
68	SP5	78		(Germany) Sebastian Stahl (Germany) Marcel Lasée (Spain) "Pedro Passyutu" (Germany) Thomas Wirtz	BMW M3 GT	116
69	**N2**	**222**		**(New Zealand) John McIntyre (New Zealand) Timothy Martin (New Zealand) Mike Eady (New Zealand) Gregory Taylor**	**Honda Civic Type R**	**116**
70	SP3	122		(Germany) Andreas Dingert (Germany) Andreas Konrath (Germany) Fritz Köhler (Germany) Reiner Zimmermann	Volkswagen Golf GTi	116
71	V2	180		(Germany) Sebastian Krell (Germany) Johann-Georg Riecker (Germany) Hanjo Hillmann (Germany) Stefan Viehmann	BMW 318is	116
72	SPC1	240		(Germany) Mark Giesbrecht (Germany) Dino Drössiger (Germany) Rolf Scheuring (United States) Spencer Trenery	Honda Civic Type R	116
73	SP3	127		(Germany) Dirk Lehn (Germany) Christoph Ecker (Germany) Carsten Rooch (Germany) Matthias Teich	BMW 320i	116
74	SP6	47		(France) Patrick Prieur (France) Daniel Oger (France) Dominique Piel (France) Thierry Guitton	BMW Z3 M Coupé	116
75	S1	256	Classic Driver	(United Kingdom) "Fred" (United Kingdom) "Barney" (Germany) Tillmann Gante (United Kingdom) Stephen Archer	Alfa Romeo 147 JTD	116
76	SP4	120		(Germany) Andreas Mäder (Switzerland) Ralf Schmid (Germany) Marius Offermanns (Germany) Reiner Schönauer	Honda S2000	116
77	SP3	13		(Australia) Colin Osborne (Australia) Trevor Keene (Australia) John Teulan	Toyota Corolla	115
78	V5	17		(Hungary) Franjo Kovac (Denmark) Kurt Thiim (Germany) Martin Tschornia (Germany) Ulf Giljohann	BMW M3	115
79	SP5	71		(Germany) Frank Nöhring (Germany) Ulrich Becker (United Kingdom) Colin White	BMW M3	115
80	V2	177		(Germany) Nicole Müllenmeister (Switzerland) Petra Beyrer (Germany) Jutta Beisiegel (Germany) Carola Feyen-Esser	Honda Civic 1.8 Sport	114
81	SP7	40		(Germany) Peter Schmidt (Germany) Jan-Erik Slooten (United Kingdom) Rupert Douglas-Pennant (United Kingdom) Nick Jacobs	Porsche GT3	114
82	SP2	153		(Australia) Robert Rubis (Australia) Stephen Borness (Australia) Mal Rose (Australia) Dane Rudolph	Mitsubishi Mirage	113
83	SP6	58	(Sweden) Carlsson Racing	(Germany) Rainer Brückner (Sweden) Ingvar Carlsson (Germany) Wolfgang Kaufmann (Germany) Frank Diefenbacher	Mercedes-Benz SLK 350	113
84	SP2	155	(Germany) MSC Konz e.V.	(Germany) Eric Freichels (Germany) Michael Klotz (Germany) Uwe Meuren (Germany) Arndt Hallmanns	Honda Civic Type R	112
85	SP6	68	(Germany) Motorsport Arena Oschersleben	(Germany) Peter Posavac (Germany) Jürgen Steiner (Germany) Christian Feineis (Germany) Thomas Neumann	BMW Z3 M Coupé	112
86	SP2	158		(Germany) Maike Suhr (Germany) Udo Schütt (Germany) Lars Döhmann (France) Philippe Godet	Suzuki Ignis Sport	112
87	V4	188		(Germany) Ralph Caba (Germany) Volker Lange (Germany) Olaf Hansen (Germany) Karlheinz Hostenbach	Ford Fiesta	112
88	SPC1	220	(Germany) Pistenclub e.V.	(Germany) Andre Krumbach (Germany) Andreas Teichmann (Japan) Ikuma Takahashi (Finland) Niko Nurminen	Honda Civic Type R	112
89	S1	252		(Germany) Traudl Klink (Germany) Elmar Jurek (Germany) Jens Borghoff	Volkswagen Golf TDI	112
90	SP7	39		(Germany) Dirk Gerhardy (Luxembourg) Georges Kuhn (Germany) Peter Göhringer (Germany) Dietmar Schmid	Porsche 911 RS	112
91	SP3	131	(Germany) MSC Ruhr-Blitz Bochum e.V. im ADAC	(Norway) Hakon Schjaerin (Norway) Roger Sandberg (Norway) Atle Gulbrandsen	Audi A4	111
92	S1	270	(Germany) Pro Handicap e.V.	(Germany) Wolfgang Müller (Germany) Frank Breidenstein (Germany) Petra Diederich	Opel Astra Caravan	111
93	SPC1	237	(Germany) Fleper Motorsport	(Germany) Joachim Steidel (Germany) Herbert von Danwitz (Germany) Marcel Hoppe	Honda Civic Type R	110
94	**SP4T**	**89**		**(Germany) Patrick Brenndörfer (Germany) Martin Müller (Germany) Frank Eickholt**	**Volvo S4**	**110**
95	V4	203		(Germany) Gerhard Molzberger (Germany) Frank Lohmann (Germany) André Mühlenbruch	Honda Accord Type R	110
96	V2	179		(Germany) Martin Zybon (Germany) Michael Rank (Netherlands) Ernst Berg (Germany) Klaus Ebbing	BMW 318ti	110
97	SP1	163		(Germany) Dietrich Dimmler (Germany) Axel Potthast (Germany) Klaus Weigner (Germany) Holger Münster	Volkswagen Polo 16V	110
98	S1	250	(Germany) MCS Rottenegg	(Germany) Franz Berndorfer (Germany) Christoph Eglau (Germany) Helmut Walkolbinger (Germany) Christian Swoboda	Volkswagen Golf TDI	110
99	SP3	147		(Germany) Armin Holz (France) Philippe Godet (Germany) Lars Döhmann (Germany) Aaron Burkart	Volkswagen Golf GTi	109
100	V4	204		(Germany) Marco Keller (Denmark) Kurt Thiel (Denmark) Holger Knudsen (United Kingdom) Jeff Orford	BMW M3	109
101	S1	254		(United Kingdom) Giles Groombridge (United Kingdom) Dave Ashford (United Kingdom) Steven Griffin (United Kingdom) David Smith	Alfa Romeo 147 JTD	109
102	**VD**	**215**		**(Germany) Andreas Mansfeld (Germany) Frank Herrmann (Germany) Werner Kather (Germany) Andreas Leue**	**Honda Civic D**	**108**
103	SP8	15	(Germany) Derichs Rennwagen e.V.	(Germany) Erwin Derichs (Austria) Manfred Kubik (Germany) Markus Sedlmaier (Germany) Alfred Schweiger	Audi V8	108
104	SP3	119		(Austria) Daniel Weber (Germany) Stephan Lenzen (Germany) Marian Winz	Opel Kadett GSi	108
105	SP3	108		(United States) Mike Rimmer (United Kingdom) Robin Ward (Australia) Llynden Riethmuller	Honda Civic Type R	108
106	SP3	144		(Germany) Frank Allendorf (Germany) Robert Lommel (Germany) Gerd Sieves (Switzerland) Alexander Wetzlich	Ford Puma	107
107	V4	186		(Germany) Marc Kippschull (Germany) Falko L'Hounneux (Germany) Norbert Werner (Germany) Jana Meiswinkel	Opel Astra	106
108	**S2**	**269**		**(Germany) Heribert Steiner (Germany) Norman Starke (Germany) Jochen Lutz (Germany) Bernd Albrecht**	**BMW 335d**	**106**
109	V2	175		(United States) Michael David (Germany) Reiner Bardenheuer (Germany) Thomas Simon	BMW 318ti	106
110	SP3	124		(Germany) Christian Schmidt (Germany) Marcus Mann (Germany) Yves Bucher (Germany) André Kunz	Ford Focus	106
111	SP5	73		(France) Daniel Dupont (France) Alain Giavedoni (France) Jean Louis Juchault	Porsche 968	106
112	SP3	133	(Switzerland) Ecurie Biennoise	(Switzerland) Christoph Lötscher (Switzerland) Jean-Francois Stoeckli (Switzerland) Steve Zacchia (Switzerland) Peter Rikli	Honda Integra	106
113	SP8	14	(Germany) Derichs Rennwagen e.V.	(Germany) Matthias Schenzle (Germany) Andrea Kammerl (Germany) Erwin Derichs (Germany) Helmut Undorf	Mercedes-Benz 500 SEC	106
114	SP4T	88		(Germany) Stephan Wölflick (Germany) Stefan Terkatz (Germany) Urs Bressan (Germany) Sebastian Asch	Ford Focus ST	106
115	V5	212		(Germany) Michael Bonk (Germany) Peter Bonk (Switzerland) Urs Schild (Germany) Stefan Aust	BMW 130i	105
116	SP6	53		(United Kingdom) Phillip Bennett (Switzerland) Alan van der Merwe (United Kingdom) Jonathan Price (Australia) Chris Atkinson	Subaru Impreza STi	105
117	S1	262		(Italy) Piero Rissone (Italy) Mauro Demichelis (Italy) Alberto Vescovi (Italy) Vincenzo Panacci	Fiat Grande Punto	105
118	SP3	126	(Germany) MSRT Freiamt	(Germany) Sven Fisch (Germany) Axel Duffner (Germany) Jochen Vollmer (Germany) Michael Überall	Opel Astra GSi	105
119	SP8	271		(Germany) Ralf Kraus (Germany) Bernd Schlee (Germany) Marc Christoffel	Volkswagen Golf R32	104
120	SP5	77		(Germany) Holger Fuchs (Germany) Andreas Beier (Greece) Athanasios Karageorgos (Germany) Jochen Krumbach	BMW M3	103
121	V4	187		(Germany) Michael Auert (Switzerland) Stefan Neuhorn (Germany) Heinrich Schneebeli	Opel Astra OPC	102
122	S1	261		(Italy) Giancarlo Coia (Italy) Andrea Vizzini (Italy) Alberto Richard (Italy) David Raseri	Fiat Grande Punto	102
123	SP3	117		(Germany) Matthias Behr (Germany) Gerald Dietz (Germany) Jochen Werner	BMW 320is	101
124	SP3T	104	(Germany) Jörg van Ommen Autosport	(Germany) Stefan Gies (Germany) Holger Eckhardt (Germany) Stefan Küster (Germany) Thomas Kroher	Audi A3 2.0T FSI	100
125	S2	273		(Germany) Zoran Radulovic (Germany) Gert Butenhof (Germany) Markus Großmann	BMW 330d	98
126	SP3T	102	(Germany) Jörg van Ommen Autosport	(Germany) Bernd Ostmann (Germany) Ulrich Hackenberg (Italy) Guglielmo Fiocchi (Germany) Mark Warnecke	Audi A3 2.0T FSI	98
127	SP3	140		(Sweden) Christer Folkesson (Sweden) Thomas Sjöö (Sweden) Bengt Bengtzon	Toyota MR2	96
128	S1	265	(Germany) MSC Wahlscheid e.V. im ADAC	(Germany) Ralf Zensen (Germany) Marcus Bierlein (Germany) Victor Smolski (Germany) Christopher Peters	Alfa Romeo 147 JTD	96
129	S2	274	(Italy) Lanza Motorsport	(Italy) Mauro Simoncini (Italy) Luigi Scalini (Italy) Riccardo Bachiorri (Italy) Raffaele Blasi	BMW 330d	95
130	V2	143	(Germany) Team DMV	(Germany) Manfred Beckers (Germany) Axel Duffner (Germany) Ralf Glatzel (Germany) Deniz Islek	BMW 318is	92
131	V4	193		(Germany) Peter Meyer (Germany) Michael Pingel (Germany) Christian Flessa (Germany) Uwe Seuser	BMW 325i	91
132	SP2	152		(Australia) Richard Gartner (Australia) Ric Shaw (Australia) Phil Alexander	Mitsubishi Mirage	90
133	SP1	166		(Japan) Hiroyuki Kishimoto (Japan) Akihiko Fujioka (Japan) Akigo Kurata (Germany) Jürgen Bussmann	Suzuki Swift	89
134	V4	195		(Germany) Hans Keutmann (United States) Bruce Trenery (United States) Steve Pfeifer (Germany) Frank Kuhlmann	Honda Accord Type R	88
135	SP3	107		(Germany) Walter Nawotka (Germany) Gerd Grundmann	Honda S2000	87
136	S2	267	(Germany) Pistenclub e.V.	(Germany) Giuseppe Timperanza (Germany) Hans-Werner Wüst (Germany) Franz Groß (United States) Jim Briody	BMW 135D GTR	86
137	SP3	125		(Germany) Markus Fugel (Germany) Ruben Zeltner (Germany) Uwe Wächtler (Germany) Steve Kirsch	Honda S2000	84
138	S2	266		(Germany) Thomas Haider (Germany) Rainer Kutsch (Germany) Marc Hiltscher	BMW 330d	82
139	S1	259		(Germany) Dirk Kremp (Germany) Karl Brinker (Germany) Sven Böckman (Germany) Marcel Leipert	Ford Fiesta ST	82
140	SP3	142	(Germany) Team DMV	(Germany) Deniz Islek (Germany) Michael Kallscheid (Germany) Gustav Edelhoff (Germany) Christian Kosbu	SEAT Ibiza	75
141	SP3	115		(Germany) Kurt Lotz (Germany) Mayk Wienkötter (Luxembourg) Patrick Dubois (Germany) Michael Weykopf	Honda S2000	75

=== Not Classified ===
Pos	Class	No	Team	Drivers	Car	Laps
NC	SP3	141	(Germany) Team DMV	(Germany) Hans-Christoph Schäfer (Germany) Dirk Leßmeister (Germany) Burkhard Scheffler (Germany) Maik Pötzl	SEAT Ibiza	73
NC	S2	244		(Germany) Christian Eigen (Germany) Julia Drewes (Germany) Marc Hoyer (Germany) Timo Frings	Volkswagen Golf	70
NC	SP5	81		(United Kingdom) Adrian Watt (United Kingdom) Peter Duke (United Kingdom) Robert Bishop	BMW M3	69
NC	V4	206		(Germany) Jörg Wiskirchen (Germany) Rudi Wiskirchen (Germany) Oliver Schmidt (Germany) Martin Mechtersheimer	BMW M3	64
NC	SP1	162		(Switzerland) Walter Kaufmann (Switzerland) Gregor Nick (Sweden) Hans Söderholm	Rover Mini Cooper	60
NC	SP1	161		(Germany) Eberhard Schreckert (Germany) Uwe Köthe (Germany) Marco Fragale (Germany) Andreas Steep	Toyota Yaris RS	55
NC	SP3	116		(Germany) Jörg Winterhagen (Germany) Horst Walther (Germany) André Somberg (Germany) Franz Schütte	Honda S2000	53
NC	SP4	98		(Australia) Gary Lucas (Australia) Denis Cribbin (United States) Paul Jenkins (Australia) Jamie McIntyre	Honda Prelude	41
NC	SP4T	86		(Germany) Björn Herrmann (Germany) Mike Martin (Germany) Michael Schumann (Austria) Wolfgang Treml	Ford Focus	17

=== DNF ===
Pos	Class	No	Team	Drivers	Car	Laps
DNF	SP7	36	(Germany) Land-Motorsport PZK	(Germany) Marc Basseng (Germany) Patrick Simon (Germany) Timo Scheider (Germany) Frank Stippler	Porsche GT3	133
DNF	SP6	67		(Germany) Michael Funke (Austria) Frank Schmickler (United Kingdom) Richard Meins (Germany) Henry Walkenhorst	BMW M3 GTR	115
DNF	SP5	76		(Sweden) Hans Andreasson (Sweden) Mikael Redsäter (Sweden) Inge Andersson (Sweden) Christer Pernvall	Porsche 944 S2	112
DNF	SP4	93		(Germany) Werner Bauer (Germany) Philipp Brunn (Germany) Ulfried Baumert (Germany) Florian Hildner	BMW M3	98
DNF	SP3	118		(Germany) Stefan Schmelter (Germany) Andreas Telker (Germany) Ralf Klein (Germany) Peter Wichmann	Opel Astra	96
DNF	S2	272		(Germany) Dietrich Hueck (Germany) Werner Habermehl (Germany) Ellen Lohr (Germany) Tom Schwister	Alfa Romeo 147 JTD	95
DNF	SP7	97		(Germany) Klaus Abbelen (Germany) Sabine Schmitz (Germany) Andy Bovensiepen (Germany) Heinz Dieter Schornstein	Porsche GT3	87
DNF	SP1	164		(Austria) Karl-Heinz Teichmann (Germany) Michael Schneider (Germany) Walter Schneider (Germany) Peter Kreuer	Suzuki Swift	86
DNF	SP5	101	(Germany) Motorsportzentrum Rhein-Ruhr	(Germany) Kenneth Heyer (Germany) Thomas Mühlenz (Germany) Michael Schrey (Italy) Luca Moro	SEAT León Supercopa	85
DNF	V5	217		(Germany) Alfred Backer (Germany) Marc Bronzel (Germany) Michael Koch (Germany) Jörg Wilhelm	BMW 130i	85
DNF	SP7	26		(Germany) Michael Bäder (Germany) Tobias Hagenmeyer (Germany) Ralf Schall (Germany) Markus Gedlich	BMW M3	83
DNF	SP6	56		(United Kingdom) Dave Cox (United Kingdom) Nick Barrow (United Kingdom) Willie Moore	BMW M3	82
DNF	SP7	37	(Germany) Cargraphic-Birkart-RDM-Racing	(Germany) Steffen Schlichenmeier (Germany) Kurt Ecke (Germany) Fred Scheunemann	Porsche 911	81
DNF	SP3	145		(Germany) Peter Venn (United Kingdom) Dave Allan (United Kingdom) Peter Cate (Germany) Kai Riemer	Honda Civic Type R	81
DNF	SPC1	223	(Germany) Fuchs-Personal-Team-Nett	(Germany) Jürgen Nett (Germany) Rolf Schütz (Germany) Thomas Reuter	Peugeot 206 RC	80
DNF	SP4	96		(Germany) Ullrich Andree (Germany) Heinz-Josef Bermes (Germany) Stephan Herter (Germany) Andy Middendorf	Volvo S60	76
DNF	SP3	135		(Italy) Luigi Emiliani (Italy) Francesco Ragozzino (Italy) Umberto Nacamuli (Italy) Stefano Bucci	Renault Clio RS	70
DNF	SPC1	239	(Germany) MSC Mühlheim e.V. im ADAC	(Germany) Michael Marsani (Germany) Olaf Neunkirchen (Germany) Roland Lotzmann (Germany) Kai von Schauroth	Honda Civic Type R	70
DNF	SP5	82		(Germany) Franz Rohr (Germany) Tom Nack (Germany) Michael Zehe (Germany) Felix Kinzer	Audi A3	68
DNF	SP7	35		(Germany) Wolfgang Destree (Germany) Kersten Jodexnis (Germany) Dietmar Binkowska (Germany) Dieter Köll	Porsche GT3	67
DNF	SP6	55	(Germany) Gotcha Racing Team	(Germany) Franz Graf zu Ortenburg (Germany) Christian Graf von Wedel (United Kingdom) Charles Dean	BMW Z3 M Coupé - BMW	63
DNF	SP8	3	(Germany) Zakspeed Racing GmbH & Co. KG	(Germany) Peter Zakowski (Germany) Sascha Bert (Netherlands) Patrick Huisman (Germany) Hans-Peter Huppert-Nieder	Dodge Viper GTS-R	59
DNF	SP3	109		(Switzerland) Jürg Hügli (Germany) Kurt Vogel (Germany) Eric Christen (Switzerland) Alfredo Saligari	Alfa Romeo 156	58
DNF	SP2	154		(France) Denis Gaessler (France) Francis Fabbri (France) "Segolen" (France) Etienne Smulevici	Peugeot 206 CC	58
DNF	SP6	70		(Germany) Willi Friedrichs (Germany) Leo Löwenstein (Germany) Werner Riess (Germany) Josef Wenger	BMW M3	57
DNF	SP2	156		(Germany) Michael Milz (Germany) Bernd Erdmann (Germany) Theo Milz	Citroën AX	57
DNF	SPC1	235		(Germany) Gerd Schumacher (Germany) Bernd Schneider (Germany) Heinz-Peter Schumacher (Germany) René Gassen	Honda Civic Type R	56
DNF	SP2	132	(Germany) TLM Team Lauderbach Motorsport	(Germany) Ralf Martin (Germany) Thomas Klenke (Germany) Patrick Bernhardt (Germany) Moritz Bahlsen	Ford Fiesta	54
DNF	SPC1	236	(Germany) Fleper Motorsport	(Ukraine) Alex Kikireshko (Ukraine) Alexgi Mochanov (Ukraine) Valeriy Gorban	Honda Civic Type R	54
DNF	S1	260	(Germany) MSC Ruhr-Blitz Bochum e.V. im ADAC	(Netherlands) Martin De Groot (Germany) Rüdiger Förster (Germany) Uwe Degner (Germany) Uwe Göbel	Alfa Romeo 147 JTD	54
DNF	SP6	60	(Germany) Duller Motorsport	(Austria) Dieter Quester (Germany) Hans-Joachim Stuck (Germany) Dirk Werner (Germany) Artur Deutgen	BMW M3	53
DNF	SP8	6		(Germany) Hans Russwurm (Germany) Marcus Schurig (Germany) Simon Englerth (Germany) Ralf Weiner	Audi RS 4	50
DNF	SP5	74		(Germany) Rudi Speich (Germany) Roland Waschkau (Germany) Klaus Hormes	Audi A3	50
DNF	SP3	121		(Germany) Andreas Mäder (Switzerland) Harald Jacksties (Germany) Reinhold Renger (Germany) Nils Bartels	Honda S2000	50
DNF	SPC1	234		(Germany) Thomas Frank (United Kingdom) Christer Hallgren (United Kingdom) Meyrick Cox (Germany) Michael Ecker	Honda Civic Type R	50
DNF	S1	258		(Germany) Gerrie Williams (Netherlands) Ivo Breukers (Netherlands) Johan Jansen	SEAT León 2.0 TDi	50
DNF	SP5	79		(Germany) Kornelius Hoffmann (Germany) Iris Hoffmann (Germany) Peter Seher (Germany) Hans Schütt	BMW M3	47
DNF	SP3	210		(Germany) Bora Bölck (Germany) Christoph Esser (Germany) Marc Viebahn	Audi TT 2.0	46
DNF	SP8	20	(Germany) AC Radevormwald e.V. im ADAC	(Germany) Martin Wagenstetter (Germany) Florian Fricke (Germany) Andreas Barthlomeyczik (Switzerland) Mathias Schläppi	BMW 840 ci	45
DNF	SP4	95		(Germany) Carsten Spengemann (Germany) Frank Schmitz (Germany) Friedrike Moritz (Germany) Anja Wassertheurer	Honda S2000	43
DNF	SP8	21	(Germany) Jörg van Ommen Autosport	(Germany) Jörg van Ommen (Germany) Tim Schrick (Germany) Markus Lungstrass (Germany) Thomas Mutsch	Wiesmann R-GT	42
DNF	V4	205		(Germany) Nikolaus Wegeler (Germany) Stephan Rössel (Germany) Hans-Robert Holzer	BMW M3	40
DNF	V2	181	(Germany) MSC Wahlscheid e.V. im ADAC	(Germany) Rolf Derscheid (Germany) Michael Flehmer (Germany) Werner Schlehecker (Germany) Ralph Moog	BMW 318is	39
DNF	SP8	41	(Germany) Motorsportzentrum Rhein-Ruhr	(Germany) Gerd Niemeyer (Austria) Michael Prym (Germany) Oliver Louisoder (Germany) Andreas Gülden	Chevrolet Corvette (C5)	37
DNF	SP4	92		(Germany) Hans-Hatto Karl (Germany) Udo Förster (Germany) Arnd Meier (Germany) "Wolf Silvester"	BMW M3	37
DNF	SP6	57		(Austria) Hannes Ressl (Austria) Harald Egger (Austria) Reinhard Wenger (Germany) Manfred Vallant	Porsche Boxster	36
DNF	SPC1	231		(Germany) Andreas Weiland (Germany) Martin Hütter (Germany) Stefan Gosch (Germany) Frank Brakel	Honda Civic Type R	35
DNF	S2	268		(Germany) Henning Meyersrenken (Germany) Reik Kleinherbers (Germany) "Michael Langer" (Germany) Patrick Kentenich	BMW 335d	33
DNF	SP6	51		(Germany) Stefan Schlesack (Germany) Klaus Niedzwiedz (Japan) Takayuki Kinoshita (Germany) Werner Kather	Honda NSX	30
DNF	E1XP	7	(Italy) Maserati SPA	(Italy) Andrea Bertolini (Germany) Michael Bartels (Belgium) Eric van de Poele (Italy) Gianni Giudici	Maserati Gransport Light GT3	26
DNF	S1	264	(Germany) Motorsport Arena Oschersleben	(Germany) Reinhard Huber (Germany) Guido Thierfelder (Germany) Jochen Übler (Germany) Claudia Hürtgen	BMW 120d	24
DNF	S1	255		(Germany) Eberhard Rattunde (New Zealand) Wayne Moore (New Zealand) Maurice O'Reilly (Germany) Heiner Immig	Volkswagen Golf TDI	23
DNF	SP6	48		(Germany) Klaus Müller (Germany) Helmut Abels (Germany) Peter Friedrichs (Czech Republic) Robert Šenkýř	BMW M3	22
DNF	SP6	63	(Germany) Kelleners Motorsport	(Germany) Ralf Kelleners (United States) Forest Barber (Germany) Sven Kehl	BMW M3	22
DNF	SP5	75		(France) Jean Baptiste Chretien (France) Fabrice Reicher (France) Arnaud Peyroles	BMW M3	22
DNF	SP3	113		(Germany) Matthias Holle (Germany) Uwe Nittel (Germany) Wolfgang Weber (Germany) Timo Kluck	Honda S2000	22
DNF	SP6	50	(Germany) Rheydter Club für Motorsport	(Germany) Walter Prüser (Germany) Rolf Jansen (Germany) Walter Prüser Jr. (Germany) Sascha Kremers	BMW Z3 M Coupé	21
DNF	SP7	44		(Germany) Pius Tschümpelin (Germany) Stefan Beil (Germany) Dirk Müller (Germany) Marko Hartung	Porsche GT3	20
DNF	SP4T	87		(Germany) Hans-Georg Ströter (Germany) Erwin Kallies (Germany) Gregor Morawitz (Germany) Christoph Knour	Ford Focus	17
DNF	SP7	10	(Germany) Scuderia Augustusburg Brühl e.V. im ADAC	(Germany) Johannes Scheid (Germany) Oliver Kanz (Germany) Dennis Rostek (Germany) Christian Menzel	BMW M3	12
DNF	SP8	16		(Australia) Mal Rose (Australia) Adam Wallis (Australia) Kevin Burton (Australia) Anthony Robson	Holden Commodore	12
DNF	V5	216		(Germany) Frank Schrumm (Bahrain) Jabel Al Khalifa (Germany) Werner Gusenbauer (Germany) Andreas Herwerth	BMW M3	12
DNF	SP2	157		(Germany) Jörg Kosmalla (Germany) Uwe Karp (Germany) Michael Daum (Germany) Alfred Mertens	Opel Corsa	11
DNF	SP3	139	(Germany) paragon AG	(Germany) Klaus Dieter Frers (Austria) Armin Zumtobel (Germany) Patrick Bernhardt	Ford Fiesta	10
DNF	SP3	114		(Germany) Markus Horn (Germany) Karl Pflanz (Germany) Christian Steffens (Germany) Michael Hofmann	Honda S2000	9
DNF	S1	248	(Germany) PSP Racing Team	(Germany) "Smudo" (Germany) Thomas von Löwis of Menar (Germany) Thorsten Stadler (Germany) Lutz Wolzenburg	Ford Mustang GT	5
DNF	V2	178		(Germany) Lutz Kögel (Germany) Titus Dittmann (Germany) Julius Dittmann (Germany) Michael Schlüter	BMW 318is	4
DNF	SP7	99		(Germany) Stefan Beil (Germany) Norbert Fischer (Germany) Edgar Althoff (Germany) Paul Hulverscheid	Porsche Cayman RS	3
DNF	V4	198		(Germany) Wolfgang Wegner-Bscher (Germany) Stefan Müller (Germany) Heiner Weiss (Germany) Nicolaus Hatzfeld	BMW 325i	3
DNF	SP7	45	(Germany) Vertu-Racing	(Germany) Harald Weiland (Germany) Matthias Weiland (Germany) Friedrich Ungnadner (Germany) Gerd Winter	Porsche GT3	2
DNF	SPC1	225	(Germany) Schirra Motoring	(Germany) Philipp Stange (Germany) Marco Wolf (Germany) Michael Hess (Germany) Bernhard Laber	Peugeot 206 RC	2
DNF	SP8	4	(Germany) Raeder Motorsport GmbH	(Germany) Dirk Adorf (Germany) Hermann Tilke (Germany) Peter Oberndorfer	Lamborghini Gallardo	1

=== DNS ===
Pos	Class	No	Team	Drivers	Car	Laps
DNS	SP7	23		(Germany) Peter Mies (Germany) Thomas Sluis (Austria) Michael Prym	Porsche 911 Carrera RSR	0
DNS	SP7	38	(Germany) Dolate Motorsport	(Denmark) Kurt Thiim (Germany) Guido Wirtz (Germany) Jürgen Meyer (Germany) Hans-Robert Holzer	BMW M3	0
DNS	SP8	168	(Germany) Team DMV	(Germany) Wolfgang Förster (Germany) Hagen Schwarze (Germany) Elmar Braunsch (Germany) Frank Kräling	Ford Focus ST	0
DNS	S2	275		(Venezuela) Johnny Cecotto (Germany) Thomas Riethmüller (Italy) Diego Romanini	Subaru Impreza STi	0

== Bibliography ==
- Jörg-Richard Ufer & Deborah Ufer. 24 Stunden Nürburgring Nordschleife 2006 (in German). Gruppe C Motorsport Verlag. ISBN 978-3-928540-48-3.
