= 2003 German Formula Three Championship =

Seasons
- ← 2002 2004 →

The 2003 ATS Formel 3 Cup was a multi-event motor racing championship for single-seat open wheel formula racing cars that held across Europe. The championship featured drivers competing in two-litre Formula Three racing cars built by Dallara which conform to the technical regulations, or formula, for the championship. It was the inaugural edition of the ATS F3 Cup. It commenced on 3 May at Oschersleben and ended at the same place on 12 October after eight double-header rounds.

JB Motorsport driver João Paulo de Oliveira became the first and only Brazilian champion. He dominated the season, winning all but three races. Sven Barth won Rookie title and one of the races to finish the season as runner-up with 138-point gap to de Oliveira. The third place went to Hannes Neuhauser, who won both races of the opening round.

The original German Formula 3 Championship series came to an end at the close of the 2002 season, when the French and German Formula 3 series merged to form the Formula 3 Euro Series.

However, some teams did not agree with this merger, and the original promoters of the series decided to establish a new national German Formula 3 series, starting in 2003, to replace the original German Formula 3. This new series continued until 2014, consistently utilizing chassis models from previous years, which caused it to lose some of its relevance on the international stage.

== Teams and drivers ==
All drivers competed in Dallara chassis; model listed.

Team	No.	Driver	Chassis	Status	Rounds
(Belgium) JB Motorsport	1	(Switzerland) Adrian Wolf	F302/010	R	7–8
(Belgium) JB Motorsport	2	(Brazil) João Paulo de Oliveira	F302/072		All
(Germany) Trella Motorsport	3	(Germany) Catharina Felser	F302/007		All
(Germany) Trella Motorsport	4	(Germany) Thomas Holzer	F302/087	R	4–8
(Germany) EMS Motorsport	5	(Germany) Markus Mann	F300/041	R	All
(Austria) Franz Wöss Racing	8	(Belgium) Olivier Muytjens	F302/087		1–2
(Austria) Franz Wöss Racing	8	(Austria) Franz Wöss	F302/087		3
(Austria) Franz Wöss Racing	9	(Germany) Sven Barth	F399/072	R	All
(Austria) Franz Wöss Racing	10	(Germany) André Fibier	F399/011		2
(Austria) Franz Wöss Racing	10	(Germany) Marcel Lasée	F399/011		3
(Austria) Franz Wöss Racing	10	(Germany) Ina Fabry	F399/011		4–6
(Austria) Franz Wöss Racing	10	(Germany) David Hemkemeyer	F399/011		7–8
(Germany) Christian Zeller	11	(Germany) Christian Zeller	F300/050		3, 7
(France) Remy Striebig	12	(France) Remy Striebig	F399/009		3
(Czech Republic) KFR Team F3	14	(Czech Republic) Tomáš Kostka	F302/044		All
(Austria) Petutschnig Engineering	16	(Austria) Denis G. Watt	F302/074		1
(Austria) Petutschnig Engineering	16	(Austria) Franz Wöss	F302/074		2
(Austria) Petutschnig Engineering	16	(Slovakia) Tomáš Tóth	F302/074	R	6–8
(Germany) JMS Jenichen Motorsport	17	(Germany) Michael Herich	F399/068	R	2
(Germany) JMS Jenichen Motorsport	18	(Italy) Luca Iannaccone	F301/010		All
(Germany) JMS Jenichen Motorsport	19	(Italy) Diego Romanini	F399/007		1–6, 8
(Austria) Achleitner Motorsport	20	(Austria) Hannes Neuhauser	F302/068		All
(Germany) Rennsport Rössler	21	(Switzerland) Adrian Wolf	F399/068		4
(Germany) Rennsport Rössler	21	(Germany) Dennis Melcher	F399/068		5
(Germany) Rennsport Rössler	21	(Germany) Florian Stoll	F399/068		7
(Germany) Rennsport Rössler	21	(Croatia) Marin Čolak	F399/068		8
(Germany) Rennsport Rössler	22	(Germany) Thomas Rössler	F301/031		All
(Germany) Brendecke Motorsport	23	(Germany) Frank Brendecke	F300/023		All
(Germany) FS Motorsport	24	(Germany) Franz Schmöller	F302/050	R	All
(Switzerland) Bordoli Motorsport	25	(Switzerland) Tobias Blättler	F301/026		3
(Switzerland) Bordoli Motorsport	25	(Switzerland) Michel Frey	F300/011		4, 6, 8
(Switzerland) Bordoli Motorsport	25	(Switzerland) Jakob Bordoli	F300/011		7
(Switzerland) Jo Zeller Racing	26	(Switzerland) Jo Zeller	F301/006		3
(Switzerland) Jo Zeller Racing	26	(Switzerland) Tobias Blättler	F301/026		7
(Switzerland) Jo Zeller Racing	31	(Switzerland) Urs Rüttimann	F396/023		7
(Sweden) Performance Racing	27	(United Kingdom) Justin Sherwood	F300/019		4–5
(Sweden) Performance Racing	28	(Canada) Jesse Mason	F399/042		4
(Sweden) Performance Racing	28	(Netherlands) Ross Zwolsman	F399/042		5
(Sweden) Performance Racing	28	(Pakistan) Adam Langley-Khan	F399/042		7
(Austria) HS Technik Motorsport	29	(Austria) Roman Hoffmann	F301/016		6–7
(Hungary) Tomas Muskát	32	(Hungary) Tomas Muskát	F397/051		7
(Poland) Jacek Sadkiewicz	34	(Poland) Jacek Sadkiewicz	F397/046		7

Icon	Class
R	Rookie

== Race calendar and results ==
With the exception of two rounds at A1-Ring in Austria, all rounds took place on German soil.

Round		Circuit	Date	Pole position	Fastest lap	Winning driver	Winning team
1	R1	Motorsport Arena Oschersleben	3 May	(Austria) Hannes Neuhauser	(Brazil) João Paulo de Oliveira	(Austria) Hannes Neuhauser	(Austria) Achleitner Motorsport
1	R2	Motorsport Arena Oschersleben	4 May	(Austria) Hannes Neuhauser	(Austria) Hannes Neuhauser	(Austria) Hannes Neuhauser	(Austria) Achleitner Motorsport
2	R1	EuroSpeedway Lausitz	10 May	(Brazil) João Paulo de Oliveira	(Brazil) João Paulo de Oliveira	(Brazil) João Paulo de Oliveira	(Belgium) JB Motorsport
2	R2	EuroSpeedway Lausitz	11 May	(Brazil) João Paulo de Oliveira	(Brazil) João Paulo de Oliveira	(Brazil) João Paulo de Oliveira	(Belgium) JB Motorsport
3	R1	Hockenheimring	14 June	(Switzerland) Jo Zeller	(Brazil) João Paulo de Oliveira	(Brazil) João Paulo de Oliveira	(Belgium) JB Motorsport
3	R2	Hockenheimring	15 June	(Brazil) João Paulo de Oliveira	(Brazil) João Paulo de Oliveira	(Brazil) João Paulo de Oliveira	(Belgium) JB Motorsport
4	R1	Nürburgring	12 July	(Brazil) João Paulo de Oliveira	(Brazil) João Paulo de Oliveira	(Brazil) João Paulo de Oliveira	(Belgium) JB Motorsport
4	R2	Nürburgring	13 July	(Brazil) João Paulo de Oliveira	(Brazil) João Paulo de Oliveira	(Brazil) João Paulo de Oliveira	(Belgium) JB Motorsport
5	R1	EuroSpeedway Lausitz	19 July	(Brazil) João Paulo de Oliveira	(Brazil) João Paulo de Oliveira	(Brazil) João Paulo de Oliveira	(Belgium) JB Motorsport
5	R2	EuroSpeedway Lausitz	20 July	(Brazil) João Paulo de Oliveira	(Brazil) João Paulo de Oliveira	(Brazil) João Paulo de Oliveira	(Belgium) JB Motorsport
6	R1	A1-Ring	23 August	(Brazil) João Paulo de Oliveira	(Brazil) João Paulo de Oliveira	(Brazil) João Paulo de Oliveira	(Belgium) JB Motorsport
6	R2	A1-Ring	24 August	(Brazil) João Paulo de Oliveira	(Brazil) João Paulo de Oliveira	(Brazil) João Paulo de Oliveira	(Belgium) JB Motorsport
7	R1	A1-Ring	20 September	(Austria) Hannes Neuhauser	(Brazil) João Paulo de Oliveira	(Germany) Sven Barth	(Austria) Franz Wöss Racing
7	R2	A1-Ring	21 September	(Brazil) João Paulo de Oliveira	(Brazil) João Paulo de Oliveira	(Brazil) João Paulo de Oliveira	(Belgium) JB Motorsport
8	R1	Motorsport Arena Oschersleben	11 October	(Brazil) João Paulo de Oliveira	(Brazil) João Paulo de Oliveira	(Brazil) João Paulo de Oliveira	(Belgium) JB Motorsport
8	R2	Motorsport Arena Oschersleben	12 October	(Brazil) João Paulo de Oliveira	(Brazil) João Paulo de Oliveira	(Brazil) João Paulo de Oliveira	(Belgium) JB Motorsport

== Championship standings ==
=== Cup ===
- Points were awarded as follows:

1	2	3	4	5	6	7	8	9	10	PP
20	15	12	10	8	6	4	3	2	1	3

Pos	Driver	OSC1		LAU1		HOC		NÜR		LAU2		A1R1		A1R2		OSC2		Pts
1	(Brazil) João Paulo de Oliveira	2	2	**1**	**1**	1	**1**	**1**	**1**	**1**	**1**	**1**	**1**	8	**1**	**1**	**1**	329
2	(Germany) Sven Barth	7	5	2	3	2	2	2	2	4	3	6	3	1	3	4	4	191
3	(Austria) Hannes Neuhauser	**1**	**1**	3	2	6	Ret	7	3	2	7	5	2	**Ret**	2	2	2	185
4	(Germany) Markus Mann	5	6	4	4	3	4	DNS	DNS	5	13	Ret	7	3	6	3	3	110
5	(Germany) Franz Schmöller	4	9	5	8	4	7	6	6	Ret	4	2	5	7	Ret	6	Ret	92
6	(Germany) Catharina Felser	3	4	7	5	14	6	Ret	10	10	10	3	6	5	4	9	10	82
7	(Germany) Thomas Holzer							4	5	6	6	7	8	2	5	5	7	72
8	(Czech Republic) Tomáš Kostka	9	3	9	6	8	Ret	9	8	8	5	4	Ret	Ret	7	8	6	64
9	(Switzerland) Adrian Wolf							3	7					4	8	7	5	41
10	(Italy) Diego Romanini	6	7	6	7	5	Ret	14†	15	9	8	9	9			10	8	41
11	(Netherlands) Ross Zwolsman									3	2							27
12	(Switzerland) Michel Frey							5	4			14	11			Ret	9	20
13	(Switzerland) Jo Zeller					**7**	3											19
14	(Austria) Roman Hoffmann											8	4	6	12			19
15	(United Kingdom) Justin Sherwood							8	DSQ	7	9							9
16	(Germany) Marcel Lasée					Ret	5											8
17	(Belgium) Olivier Muytjens	8	8	15	Ret													6
18	(Germany) Andre Fibier			8	9													5
19	(Switzerland) Tobias Blättler					9	8							14	15			5
20	(Germany) Frank Brendecke	10	13	11	11	10	9	13	13	12	14	13	12	19	13	13	13	4
21	(Slovakia) Tomáš Tóth											Ret	10	10	9	11	Ret	4
22	(Germany) Ina Fabry							10	9	11	11	12	15					3
23	(Pakistan) Adam Langley-Khan													9	19			2
24	(Germany) Michael Herich			10	10													2
25	(Austria) Denis Watt	Ret	10															1
26	(Austria) Franz Wöss			12	12	12	10											1
27	(Algeria) Nassim Sidi Said											10	13					1
28	(Germany) Florian Stoll													12	10			1
29	(Germany) Thomas Rössler	11	11	14	14	11	12	12	12	14	15	11	14	Ret	14	DNS	DNS	0
30	(Canada) Jesse Mason							11	11									0
31	(Switzerland) Jacob Bordoli													11	11			0
32	(Germany) Christian Zeller					13	11							17	16			0
33	(Germany) David Hemkemeyer													13	17	12	12	0
34	(Italy) Luca Iannaccone	12	13	13	13	Ret	13	Ret	14	15	16	15	16	16	20	DNS	DNS	0
35	(Germany) Dennis Melcher									13	12							0
36	(France) Remy Striebig					Ret	14											0
37	(Switzerland) Urs Rüttimann													15	18			0
38	(Poland) Jacek Sadkiewicz													Ret	22			0
	(Croatia) Marin Čolak															DNQ	DNQ	0
Pos	Driver	OSC1		LAU1		HOC		NÜR		LAU2		A1R1		A1R2		OSC2		Pts

Colour	Result
Gold	Winner
Silver	Second place
Bronze	Third place
Green	Points classification
Blue	Non-points classification
Blue	Non-classified finish (NC)
Purple	Retired, not classified (Ret)
Red	Did not qualify (DNQ)
Red	Did not pre-qualify (DNPQ)
Black	Disqualified (DSQ)
White	Did not start (DNS)
White	Withdrew (WD)
White	Race cancelled (C)
Blank	Did not practice (DNP)
Blank	Did not arrive (DNA)
Blank	Excluded (EX)

**Bold** – Pole
Italics – Fastest Lap

- † — Drivers did not finish the race, but were classified as they completed over 90% of the race distance.

=== Junior-Pokal (Rookie) standings ===
	Driver	Points
1	(Germany) Sven Barth	258
2	(Germany) Markus Mann	154
3	(Germany) Franz Schmöller	104
4	(Germany) Thomas Holzer	80
5	(Switzerland) Adrian Wolf	26
6	(Slovakia) Tomáš Tóth	10
7	(Belgium) Olivier Muytjens	4
8	(Germany) Michael Herich	4
