= 2002 German Formula Three Championship =

2002 racing championship

Seasons
- ← 2001 2003 →

The 2002 German Formula Three Championship (German: 2002 Deutsche Formel-3-Meisterschaft) was a multi-event motor racing championship for single-seat open wheel formula racing cars that was held across Europe. The championship featured drivers competing in two-litre Formula Three racing cars built by Dallara which conformed to the technical regulations, or formula, for the championship. It commenced on 20 April at Hockenheim and ended at the same place on 6 October after ten double-header rounds.

Team Rosberg driver Gary Paffett became the first and only British champion. He won the title, securing seven race wins. Kosuke Matsuura finished as runner-up with wins at Hockenheim and Zandvoort. Timo Glock won the Rookie title and three races with a one-point gap to Matsuura in the main championship. The other race winners were Frank Diefenbacher, Jeffrey van Hooydonk, Norbert Siedler, Markus Winkelhock and Kimmo Liimatainen.

The scoring system consisted of 10-6-4-3-2-1 points awarded to the top six finishers in the race, with 1 (one) extra point for the driver who took pole position.

The second race at the EuroSpeedway Lausitz, at July 14th, did not count towards the championship, due to the irregular stop-and-go penalty against Gary Paffett. However, the bonus point for the pole position was granted to Kosuke Matsuura.

For safety reasons, the Saturday race of the 2002 German International Formula 3 Championship was cancelled. Consequently, the third round of the championship was removed from the calendar, with no replacement scheduled. It was not possible to hold the race on Saturday afternoon (May 4, 2002) on the Nürburgring Grand Prix circuit, as the track was blanketed in dense fog. The safety risk—given the extremely limited visibility—was deemed too high for a race in Germany’s premier single-seater category. Anyway, sincer the qualifying sessions took place normally, Gary Paffett and Markus Winkelock were awarded the bonus point for pole position.

== Teams and drivers ==
All drivers competed in Dallara chassis; model listed.

Team	No.	Driver	Chassis	Engine	Status	Rounds
(Germany) Opel Team BSR	1	(Austria) Bernhard Auinger	F302/005	Opel		All
(Germany) Opel Team BSR	2	(Italy) Vitantonio Liuzzi	F302/006	Opel	R	All
(Germany) Opel Team BSR	3	(Germany) Frank Diefenbacher	F302/073	Opel		All
(Germany) Mücke Motorsport	4	(Germany) Sven Heidfeld	F302/032	Mercedes		All
(Germany) Mücke Motorsport	5	(Germany) Markus Winkelhock	F302/079	Mercedes		All
(Germany) Mücke Motorsport	35	(Germany) Marcel Lasée	F302/012	Mercedes	R	All
(Germany) Team Kolles Racing	6	(Brazil) João Paulo de Oliveira	F302/076	Mugen-Honda		1-7
(Germany) Team Kolles Racing	6	(Japan) Sakon Yamamoto	F302/076	Mugen-Honda		8-10
(Germany) Team Kolles Racing	7	(Netherlands) Charles Zwolsman Jr.	F302/038	Mugen-Honda	R	1-5
(Germany) Team Kolles Racing	7	(Netherlands) Ross Zwolsman	F302/038	Mugen-Honda	R	6-10
(Germany) Team Kolles Racing	8	(Italy) Stefano Proetto	F399/005	Mugen-Honda	R	1-7
(Germany) Team Rosberg	9	(Finland) Kimmo Liimatainen	F302/068	Opel		All
(Germany) Team Rosberg	10	(United Kingdom) Gary Paffett	F302/030	Opel		All
(Switzerland) Swiss Racing Team	11	(Austria) Norbert Siedler	F302/011	Opel		All
(Switzerland) Swiss Racing Team	12	(Switzerland) Marc Benz	F302/062	Opel	R	1-8
(Switzerland) Swiss Racing Team	12	(Italy) Stefano Proetto	F302/062	Opel	R	9-10
(Switzerland) Swiss Racing Team	14	(Switzerland) Gilles Tinguely	F302/061	Opel		All
(Italy) Prema Powerteam	15	(Portugal) César Campaniço	F302/016	Opel		All
(Italy) Prema Powerteam	16	(Japan) Kousuke Matsuura	F302/044	Opel		All
(Italy) Prema Powerteam	41	(Australia) Ryan Briscoe	F302/089	Opel		5-10
(Germany) GM Motorsport	18	(Japan) Sakon Yamamoto	F302/088	Toyota		1-7
(Germany) GM Motorsport	18	(Germany) Jörg Hardt	F302/088	Toyota	R	8-10
(Germany) GM Motorsport	19	(Austria) Clemens Stadler	F302/083	Toyota		All
(Belgium) JB Motorsport	21	(Netherlands) Stefan de Groot	F302/072	Opel	R	1-7
(Belgium) JB Motorsport	21	(Brazil) João Paulo de Oliveira	F302/072	Opel		9
(Belgium) JB Motorsport	22	(Malaysia) Rizal Ramli	F302/072	Opel	R	1-4
(Belgium) JB Motorsport	22	(Japan) Shigeki Ebihara	F302/010	Opel	R	9-10
(Germany) Trella Motorsport	24	(Germany) Christopher Brück	F302/007	Opel	R	1-4
(Germany) Trella Motorsport	24	(Malaysia) Rizal Ramli	F302/007	Opel	R	5-10
(Austria) Palfinger F3 Racing Team	25	(Austria) Marco Schärf	F302/033	Opel		All
(Austria) Palfinger F3 Racing Team	26	(Austria) Richard Lietz	F302/011	Opel	R	All
(Switzerland) Opel Team KMS	27	(Germany) Timo Glock	F302/009	Opel	R	All
(Switzerland) Opel Team KMS	28	(Italy) Mirko Venturi	F302/050	Opel	R	1-3
(Switzerland) Opel Team KMS	28	(Brazil) Juliano Moro	F302/050	Opel		5
(Switzerland) Opel Team KMS	28	(Germany) Catharina Felser	F302/050	Opel	R	7-10
(Netherlands) Van Amersfoort Racing	29	(Netherlands) Jaap van Lagen	F302/087	Opel	R	7
(Netherlands) Van Amersfoort Racing	29	(Japan) Kaichi Sato	F302/087	Opel		8-10
(Netherlands) Van Amersfoort Racing	30	(Germany) Catharina Felser	F300/001	Opel	R	1-5
(Austria) CCT Racing	32	(Colombia) Camilo Zurcher	F302/074	Opel		8
(Germany) Josef Kaufmann Racing	33	(Germany) Marco Knauf	F300/041	Opel	R	1-7, 9-10
(Germany) SLR Motorsport	34	(Germany) Markus Lehmann	F399/068	Opel		1, 3
(Italy) Team Ghinzani	97	(Netherlands) Robert Doornbos	F302/052	Mugen-Honda		All
(Italy) Team Ghinzani	98	(Austria) Gottfried Grasser	F302/042	Mugen-Honda		All
(Italy) Team Ghinzani	99	(Belgium) Jeffrey van Hooydonk	F302/003	Mugen-Honda		All

Icon	Class
R	Rookie

== Calendar ==
Round		Location	Circuit	Date	Supporting
1	R1	Hockenheim, Germany	Hockenheimring	20 April	ADAC Preis Hockenheim
1	R2	Hockenheim, Germany	Hockenheimring	21 April	ADAC Preis Hockenheim
2	R1	Nürburg, Germany	Nürburgring	4 May	64. ADAC Eifelrennen
2	R2	Nürburg, Germany	Nürburgring	5 May	64. ADAC Eifelrennen
3	R1	Saxony, Germany	Sachsenring	1 June	ADAC Preis Sachsenring
3	R2	Saxony, Germany	Sachsenring	2 June	ADAC Preis Sachsenring
4	R1	Nuremberg, Germany	Norisring	29 June	60. Norisring Speedweekend
4	R2	Nuremberg, Germany	Norisring	30 June	60. Norisring Speedweekend
5	R1	Klettwitz, Germany	EuroSpeedway Lausitz	13 July	ADAC-Rundstreckenrennen Lausitz 200
5	R2	Klettwitz, Germany	EuroSpeedway Lausitz	14 July	ADAC-Rundstreckenrennen Lausitz 200
6	R1	Hockenheim, Germany	Hockenheimring	27 July	German Grand Prix
6	R2	Hockenheim, Germany	Hockenheimring	28 July	German Grand Prix
7	R1	Nürburg, Germany	Nürburgring	3 August	ADAC Großer Preis der Tourenwagen
7	R2	Nürburg, Germany	Nürburgring	4 August	ADAC Großer Preis der Tourenwagen
8	R1	Spielberg, Austria	A1-Ring	7 September	Deutsche Tourenwagen Masters
8	R2	Spielberg, Austria	A1-Ring	8 September	Deutsche Tourenwagen Masters
9	R1	Zandvoort, Netherlands	Circuit Park Zandvoort	28 September	AvD Rundstreckenrennen Zandvoort
9	R2	Zandvoort, Netherlands	Circuit Park Zandvoort	29 September	AvD Rundstreckenrennen Zandvoort
10	R1	Hockenheim, Germany	Hockenheimring	5 October	DMV-Preis Hockenheim
10	R2	Hockenheim, Germany	Hockenheimring	6 October	DMV-Preis Hockenheim

== Results ==
Round		Circuit	Pole position	Fastest lap	Winning driver	Winning team
1	R1	(Germany) Hockenheimring	(Netherlands) Charles Zwolsman Jr.	(United Kingdom) Gary Paffett	(United Kingdom) Gary Paffett	(Germany) Team Rosberg
1	R2	(Germany) Hockenheimring	(Germany) Timo Glock	(Germany) Frank Diefenbacher	(Germany) Frank Diefenbacher	(Germany) Opel Team BSR
2	R1	(Germany) Nürburgring	(Germany) Markus Winkelhock	cancelled due to snow and fog conditions		
2	R2	(Germany) Nürburgring	(United Kingdom) Gary Paffett	cancelled due to snow and fog conditions		
3	R1	(Germany) Sachsenring	(United Kingdom) Gary Paffett	(United Kingdom) Gary Paffett	(United Kingdom) Gary Paffett	(Germany) Team Rosberg
3	R2	(Germany) Sachsenring	(Japan) Kosuke Matsuura	(Germany) Timo Glock	(Germany) Timo Glock	(Switzerland) Opel Team KMS
4	R1	(Germany) Norisring	(United Kingdom) Gary Paffett	(United Kingdom) Gary Paffett	(United Kingdom) Gary Paffett	(Germany) Team Rosberg
4	R2	(Germany) Norisring	(Japan) Kosuke Matsuura	(United Kingdom) Gary Paffett	(United Kingdom) Gary Paffett	(Germany) Team Rosberg
5	R1	(Germany) EuroSpeedway Lausitz	(United Kingdom) Gary Paffett	(United Kingdom) Gary Paffett	(United Kingdom) Gary Paffett	(Germany) Team Rosberg
5	NC	(Germany) EuroSpeedway Lausitz	(Japan) Kosuke Matsuura	(Germany) Timo Glock	(Germany) Frank Diefenbacher	(Germany) Opel Team BSR
6	R1	(Germany) Hockenheimring	(Japan) Kosuke Matsuura	(Germany) Markus Winkelhock	(Japan) Kosuke Matsuura	(Italy) Prema Powerteam
6	R2	(Germany) Hockenheimring	(Japan) Kosuke Matsuura	(Belgium) Jeffrey van Hooydonk	(Belgium) Jeffrey van Hooydonk	(Italy) Team Ghinzani
7	R1	(Germany) Nürburgring	(Italy) Vitantonio Liuzzi	(Belgium) Jeffrey van Hooydonk	(Germany) Timo Glock	(Switzerland) Opel Team KMS
7	R2	(Germany) Nürburgring	(Germany) Markus Winkelhock	(Germany) Markus Winkelhock	(Germany) Markus Winkelhock	(Germany) Mücke Motorsport
8	R1	(Austria) A1-Ring	(United Kingdom) Gary Paffett	(United Kingdom) Gary Paffett	(United Kingdom) Gary Paffett	(Germany) Team Rosberg
8	R2	(Austria) A1-Ring	(United Kingdom) Gary Paffett	(Belgium) Jeffrey van Hooydonk	(Germany) Timo Glock	(Switzerland) Opel Team KMS
9	R1	(Netherlands) Circuit Park Zandvoort	(Japan) Kosuke Matsuura	(Japan) Kosuke Matsuura	(Japan) Kosuke Matsuura	(Italy) Prema Powerteam
9	R2	(Netherlands) Circuit Park Zandvoort	(Finland) Kimmo Liimatainen	(Japan) Kosuke Matsuura	(Finland) Kimmo Liimatainen	(Germany) Team Rosberg
10	R1	(Germany) Hockenheimring	(Italy) Vitantonio Liuzzi	(Germany) Timo Glock	(United Kingdom) Gary Paffett	(Germany) Team Rosberg
10	R2	(Germany) Hockenheimring	(Germany) Timo Glock	(Germany) Markus Winkelhock	(Austria) Norbert Siedler	(Switzerland) Swiss Racing Team

== Championship standings ==
=== Championship ===
- Points were awarded as follows:

1	2	3	4	5	6	PP
10	6	4	3	2	1	1

Pos	Driver	HOC1 (Germany)		NÜR1 (Germany)		SAC (Germany)		NOR (Germany)		LAU (Germany)		HOC2 (Germany)		NÜR2 (Germany)		A1R (Austria)		ZAN (Netherlands)		HOC3 (Germany)		Pts
1	(United Kingdom) Gary Paffett	1	16	C	**C**	**1**	EX	**1**	1	**1**	11	2	6	7	7	**1**	**10**	Ret	Ret	1	7	83
2	(Japan) Kosuke Matsuura	7	DNQ	C	C	3	**4**	Ret	**3**	4	**25**	**1**	**2**	Ret	3	6	3	12	**1**	Ret	13	55
3	(Germany) Timo Glock	17	**6**	C	C	Ret	1	Ret	9	3	4	7	19	1	2	Ret	1	Ret	11	2	**4**	52
4	(Germany) Frank Diefenbacher	2	1	C	C	Ret	6	3	2	5	1	8	23†	4	14	Ret	12	4	5	5	Ret	39
5	(Belgium) Jeffrey van Hooydonk	10	2	C	C	8	12	5	10	24	3	3	1	3	5	Ret	4	Ret	Ret	Ret	23	31
6	(Austria) Norbert Siedler	4	Ret	C	C	Ret	7	Ret	7	6	19	20†	22†	Ret	26	2	5	2	8	Ret	1	28
7	(Germany) Markus Winkelhock	5	5	**C**	C	5	Ret	7	19	10	6	4	21†	21	**1**	4	15	10	13	Ret	3	28
8	(Austria) Bernhard Auinger	6	3	C	C	4	3	2	5	9	2	5	4	6	10	Ret	Ret	6	12	Ret	Ret	27
9	(Italy) Vitantonio Liuzzi	14	Ret	C	C	9	8	9	4	Ret	7	23†	25†	**2**	27	Ret	2	5	9	**Ret**	2	25
10	(Finland) Kimmo Liimatainen	15	7	C	C	EX	EX	8	13	17	8	10	9	10	9	3	7	**1**	2	6	10	22
11	(Netherlands) Robert Doornbos	23	10	C	C	6	5	Ret	6	2	23	22†	3	9	15	22†	8	Ret	4	7	Ret	17
12	(Brazil) João Paulo de Oliveira	Ret	Ret	C	C	2	2	11	21†	7	Ret	6	18	22	4			Ret	7			16
13	(Australia) Ryan Briscoe									11	15	Ret	7	23	11	5	Ret	3	3	3	5	16
14	(Portugal) César Campaniço	13	17	C	C	7	9	6	11	12	5	11	5	5	6	10	9	11	14	4	8	9
15	(Netherlands) Charles Zwolsman Jr.	**3**	4	C	C	21	13	DNQ	15	19	18											8
16	(Germany) Sven Heidfeld	16	12	C	C	10	Ret	4	8	15	16	25†	10	8	12	12	24	8	10	16	9	3
17	(Germany) Marcel Lasée	DNQ	8	C	C	23	Ret	12	14	8	12	9	17	16	8	Ret	6	7	6	Ret	15	2
18	(Japan) Kaichi Sato															17	21	Ret	20	Ret	6	1
19	(Austria) Richard Lietz	8	14	C	C	Ret	Ret	Ret	17	DNS	9	Ret	DNS	7	11	Ret	15			Ret	Ret	0
20	(Japan) Sakon Yamamoto	22	Ret	C	C	11	20†	14	Ret	18	25	17	8	DNQ	Ret	16	Ret	Ret	21	9	18	0
21	(Netherlands) Ross Zwolsman											21	12	20	13	8	18	9	Ret	Ret	21	0
22	(Austria) Clemens Stadler	18	15	C	C	17	22†	15	16	23	22	13	16	19	21	15	23	Ret	18	8	16	0
23	(Switzerland) Marc Benz	Ret	Ret	C	C	Ret	21†	10	12	13	10	26†	20†	DNS	17	9	Ret					0
24	(Austria) Gottfried Grasser	12	9	C	C	12	10	DNQ	DNQ	14	Ret	12	Ret	17	16	11	13	15	23	11	Ret	0
25	(Netherlands) Stefan de Groot	9	21	C	C	15	11	16	23	21	Ret	14	11	11	DNS							0
26	(Germany) Jörg Hardt															13	14	13	Ret	10	12	0
27	(Germany) Christopher Brück	11	11	C	C	14	18	Ret	DNS													0
28	(Germany) Catharina Felser	20	Ret	C	C	18	16	Ret	DNQ	26	26			Ret	23	21†	19	DNQ	22	14	11	0
29	(Switzerland) Gilles Tinguely	Ret	Ret	C	C	22	17	17	18	Ret	20	15	14	12	24	14	20	Ret	Ret	Ret	20	0
30	(Italy) Stefano Proetto	Ret	21	C	C	16	14	Ret	22	16	21	24†	Ret	Ret	20			Ret	17	12	17	0
31	(Germany) Marco Knauf	19	20	C	C	20	19	18	20	20	13	16	24	13	22	19	17	14	16	DNS	19	0
32	(Austria) Marco Schärf	Ret	Ret	C	C	19	Ret	13	Ret	25	Ret	18	13	14	18	20	16	16	19	Ret	Ret	0
33	(Malaysia) Rizal Ramli	21	19	C	C	25	15	DNQ	Ret	DNS	24	19	15	18	19	Ret	25	18	24	13	14	0
34	(Italy) Mirko Venturi	24	18	C	C	13	23†															0
35	(Japan) Shigeki Ebihara																	Ret	25	15	22	0
36	(Netherlands) Jaap van Lagen													15	25							0
37	(Brazil) Juliano Moro									22	17											0
38	(Colombia) Camilo Zurcher															18	22					0
39	(Germany) Markus Lehmann	Ret	21			24	DNQ															0
	(Brazil) Fábio Carbone											DNS	DNS									0
Pos	Driver	HOC1 (Germany)		NÜR1 (Germany)		SAC (Germany)		NOR (Germany)		LAU (Germany)		HOC2 (Germany)		NÜR2 (Germany)		A1R (Austria)		ZAN (Netherlands)		HOC3 (Germany)		Pts

Colour	Result
Gold	Winner
Silver	Second place
Bronze	Third place
Green	Points classification
Blue	Non-points classification
Blue	Non-classified finish (NC)
Purple	Retired, not classified (Ret)
Red	Did not qualify (DNQ)
Red	Did not pre-qualify (DNPQ)
Black	Disqualified (DSQ)
White	Did not start (DNS)
White	Withdrew (WD)
White	Race cancelled (C)
Blank	Did not practice (DNP)
Blank	Did not arrive (DNA)
Blank	Excluded (EX)

**Bold** – Pole
Italics – Fastest Lap

- † — Drivers did not finish the race, but were classified as they completed over 90% of the race distance.

=== Junior-Pokal (Rookie) standings ===
	Driver	Points
1	(Germany) Timo Glock	237
2	(Italy) Vitantonio Liuzzi	206
3	(Germany) Marcel Lasée	128
4	(Switzerland) Marc Benz	71
5	(Austria) Richard Lietz	57
6	(Netherlands) Charles Zwolsman Jr.	53
7	(Netherlands) Stefan de Groot	47
8	(Netherlands) Ross Zwolsman	29
9	(Germany) Jörg Hardt	29
10	(Germany) Christopher Brück	23
11	(Italy) Stefano Proetto	22
12	(Germany) Marco Knauf	22
13	(Malaysia) Rizal Ramli	15
14	(Germany) Catharina Felser	9
15	(Italy) Mirko Venturi	7
16	(Netherlands) Jaap van Lagen	5
17	(Japan) Shigeki Ebihara	1
