= Marcel Lasée =

German racing driver (born 1980)

- Nationality: (Germany) German
- Born: 10 January 1982 (age 44) Düsseldorf, Germany
- Categorisation: FIA Silver

Championship titles
- 2001 1999: Formula Renault 2.0 Germany; Formula Ford 1800 Germany

Marcel Lasée (born 10 January 1982) is a German racing driver. Twice a national champion in junior single-seaters, Lasée reached the Formula 3 Euro Series and was a test driver for Jordan in Formula One. He has most recently driven for Subaru at the 24 Hours of Nürburgring, twice winning the SP3T class.

== Career ==
Lasée began his single-seater career in 1999, winning the Formula Ford 1800 Germany title on debut. Moving to Formula Renault in 2000, Lasée placed eighth in Formula Renault 2000 Eurocup for Walter Lechner Racing, before winning the German series in 2001, ahead of Vitantonio Liuzzi. Stepping up to the German Formula Three Championship in 2002 with Mücke Motorsport, Lasée scored a best result of sixth at the A1-Ring and Zandvoort to end the year 17th in points. In parallel, Lasée became a test driver for Jordan Grand Prix in Formula One, sampling the EJ11 and EJ12 in a two-day test at Barcelona in January, before conducting aerodynamic work at Elvington Airfield for the team ahead of the 2002 European Grand Prix.

After completing his mandatory military service in 2003 with the Sportfördergruppe Köln-Longerich in Cologne, Lasée made a brief return to German F3 for Franz Wöss Racing, before joining Swiss Racing Team for select rounds of the Formula 3 Euro Series and the Masters of Formula 3. He notably scored a dual points finish at Nürburgring. Lasée spent the next three seasons in SEAT León Supercopa Germany, collecting three wins for a best championship finish of fourth in 2004. During 2006, Lasée also made his 24 Hours of Nürburgring debut, finishing third in the SP5 class.

Lasée then raced at the 24 Hour of Cologne kart race in 2009, before making an ADAC GT Masters cameo in the 2012 finale with Porsche-fielding Mühlner Motorsport. Following that, Lasée raced at the next five editions of the 24 Hours of Nürburgring for Subaru Tecnica International in SP3T, winning in class in both 2015 and 2016 alongside Carlo van Dam, Tim Schrick and Hideki Yamauchi. In 2022, Lasée made a one-off return to the race with Subaru, driving alongside Van Dam, Schrick and Kota Sasaki.

== Karting record ==
=== Karting career summary ===
| Season | Series | Team | Position |
|---|---|---|---|
| 1996 | Andrea Margutti Trophy – 100 Junior | | |
| 1996 | Karting World Cup – Junior A | | |
| 1998 | Deutsche Kart-Meisterschaft – Senior | | 1st |

== Racing record ==
=== Racing career summary ===
| Season | Series | Team | Races | Wins | Poles | F/Laps | Podiums | Points | Position |
|---|---|---|---|---|---|---|---|---|---|
| 1999 | Formula Ford 1800 Germany | | | | | | | | **1st** |
| 2000 | Formula Renault 2000 Eurocup | Walter Lechner Racing | | | | | | 54 | 8th |
| 2001 | Formula Renault 2.0 Germany | | 8 | 2 | 2 | 3 | 5 | 145 | **1st** |
| 2001 | Formula Renault 2000 Eurocup | Walter Lechner Racing | 2 | 0 | 0 | 0 | 0 | 52 | 11th |
| 2001 | Formula Renault 2000 Eurocup | JD Motorsport | 3 | 0 | 0 | 0 | 1 | 52 | 11th |
| 2002 | German Formula Three Championship | Mücke Motorsport | 17 | 0 | 0 | 0 | 0 | 2 | 17th |
| 2002 | Formula One | DHL Jordan Honda | Test driver | | | | | | |
| 2003 | German Formula Three Championship | Franz Wöss Racing | 2 | 0 | 0 | 0 | 0 | 8 | 16th |
| 2003 | Formula 3 Euro Series | Swiss Racing Team | 8 | 0 | 0 | 0 | 0 | 3 | 23rd |
| 2003 | Masters of Formula 3 | Swiss Racing Team | 1 | 0 | 0 | 0 | 0 | —N/a | 28th |
| 2004 | SEAT León Supercopa Germany | | 12 | 2 | 1 | 0 | 6 | 163 | 4th |
| 2005 | SEAT León Supercopa Germany | | 12 | 1 | 1 | 1 | 4 | 104 | 6th |
| 2006 | SEAT León Supercopa Germany | | 5 | 0 | 0 | 0 | 0 | 16 | 16th |
| 2006 | 24 Hours of Nürburgring – SP5 | | 1 | 0 | 0 | 0 | 1 | —N/a | **3rd** |
| 2012 | ADAC GT Masters | Mühlner Motorsport | 2 | 0 | 0 | 0 | 0 | 0 | NC |
| 2013 | 24 Hours of Nürburgring – SP3T | Subaru Tecnica International | 1 | 0 | 0 | 0 | 1 | —N/a | **2nd** |
| 2014 | 24 Hours of Nürburgring – SP3T | Subaru Tecnica International | 1 | 0 | 0 | 0 | 0 | —N/a | 4th |
| 2015 | 24 Hours of Nürburgring – SP3T | Subaru Tecnica International | 1 | 1 | 0 | 0 | 1 | —N/a | **1st** |
| 2016 | 24 Hours of Nürburgring – SP3T | Subaru Tecnica International | 1 | 1 | 0 | 0 | 1 | —N/a | **1st** |
| 2017 | 24 Hours of Nürburgring – SP3T | Subaru Tecnica International | 1 | 0 | 0 | 0 | 0 | —N/a | DNF |
| 2022 | 24 Hours of Nürburgring – SP3T | Subaru Tecnica International | 1 | 0 | 0 | 0 | 0 | —N/a | DNF |

* Season still in progress.

^{†} As Lasée was a guest driver, he was ineligible for points.

=== Complete German Formula Three Championship results ===
(key) (Races in bold indicate pole position) (Races in italics indicate fastest lap)

| Year | Entrant | Chassis | Engine | 1 | 2 | 3 | 4 | 5 | 6 | 7 | 8 | 9 | 10 | 11 | 12 | 13 | 14 | 15 | 16 | 17 | 18 | 19 | 20 | DC | Points |
|---|---|---|---|---|---|---|---|---|---|---|---|---|---|---|---|---|---|---|---|---|---|---|---|---|---|
| 2002 | Mücke Motorsport | Dallara F302/012 | Mercedes | HOC1; 1 DNQ | HOC1; 2; 8 | NÜR1; 1 C | NÜR1; 2 C | SAC; 1; 23 | SAC; 2 Ret | NOR; 1; 12 | NOR; 2; 14 | LAU; 1; 8 | LAU; 2; 12 | HOC2; 1; 9 | HOC2; 2; 17 | NÜR2; 1; 16 | NÜR2; 2; 8 | A1R; 1 Ret | A1R; 2; 6 | ZAN; 1; 7 | ZAN; 2; 6 | HOC3; 1 Ret | HOC3; 2; 15 | 17th | 2 |
| 2003 | Franz Wöss Racing | Dallara F399/011 | Opel | OSC1; 1 | OSC1; 2 | LAU1; 1 | LAU1; 2 | HOC; 1 Ret | HOC; 2; 5 | NÜR; 1 | NÜR; 2 | LAU2; 1 | LAU2; 2 | A1R1; 1 | A1R1; 2 | A1R2; 1 | A1R2; 2 | OSC2; 1 | OSC2; 2 | | | | | 16th | 8 |

=== Complete Formula Three Euro Series results ===
(key) (Races in bold indicate pole position) (Races in italics indicate fastest lap)

| Year | Entrant | Chassis | Engine | 1 | 2 | 3 | 4 | 5 | 6 | 7 | 8 | 9 | 10 | 11 | 12 | 13 | 14 | 15 | 16 | 17 | 18 | 19 | 20 | DC | Points |
|---|---|---|---|---|---|---|---|---|---|---|---|---|---|---|---|---|---|---|---|---|---|---|---|---|---|
| 2003 | Swiss Racing Team | Dallara F302/062 | Opel | HOC; 1 | HOC; 2 | ADR; 1 | ADR; 2 | PAU; 1 | PAU; 2 | NOR; 1 | NOR; 2 | LMS; 1; 19 | LMS; 2; 12 | NÜR; 1; 7 | NÜR; 2; 8 | A1R; 1; 17 | A1R; 2 Ret | ZAN; 1 | ZAN; 2 | HOC; 1; 11 | HOC; 2 Ret | MAG; 1 | MAG; 2 | 23rd | 8 |

=== Complete 24 Hours of Nürburgring results ===
| Year | Team | Co-Drivers | Car | Class | Laps | Pos. | Class Pos. |
|---|---|---|---|---|---|---|---|
| 2006 | | (Germany) Sebastian Stahl (Spain) "Pedro Passyutu" (Germany) Thomas Wirtz | BMW M3 | SP5 | 116 | 68th | **3rd** |
| 2013 | (Japan) Subaru Tecnica International | (Japan) Toshihiro Yoshida (Japan) Kota Sasaki (Netherlands) Carlo van Dam | Subaru GVB | SP3T | 80 | 26th | **2nd** |
| 2014 | (Japan) Subaru Tecnica International | (Japan) Toshihiro Yoshida (Japan) Kota Sasaki (Netherlands) Carlo van Dam | Subaru WRX STi | SP3T | 138 | 32nd | 4th |
| 2015 | (Japan) Subaru Tecnica International | (Netherlands) Carlo van Dam (Germany) Tim Schrick (Japan) Hideki Yamauchi | Subaru WRX STi | SP3T | 143 | 18th | **1st** |
| 2016 | (Japan) Subaru Tecnica International | (Netherlands) Carlo van Dam (Germany) Tim Schrick (Japan) Hideki Yamauchi | Subaru WRX STi | SP3T | 121 | 20th | **1st** |
| 2017 | (Japan) Subaru Tecnica International | (Netherlands) Carlo van Dam (Germany) Tim Schrick (Japan) Hideki Yamauchi | Subaru WRX STi | SP3T | 126 | DNF | DNF |
| 2022 | (Japan) Subaru Tecnica International | (Netherlands) Carlo van Dam (Japan) Kota Sasaki (Germany) Tim Schrick | Subaru WRX STI GT N24 | SP3T | 64 | DNF | DNF |

=== Complete ADAC GT Masters results ===
(key) (Races in bold indicate pole position) (Races in italics indicate fastest lap)

| Year | Team | Car | 1 | 2 | 3 | 4 | 5 | 6 | 7 | 8 | 9 | 10 | 11 | 12 | 13 | 14 | 15 | 16 | DC | Points |
|---|---|---|---|---|---|---|---|---|---|---|---|---|---|---|---|---|---|---|---|---|
| 2012 | Mühlner Motorsport | Porsche 911 GT3 R | OSC; 1 | OSC; 2 | ZAN; 1 | ZAN; 2 | SAC; 1 | SAC; 2 | NÜR; 1 | NÜR; 2 | RBR; 1 | RBR; 2 | LAU; 1 | LAU; 2 | NÜR; 1 | NÜR; 2 | HOC; 1; 20 | HOC; 2 Ret | NC | 0 |
