= 2000 Formula Renault 2000 Eurocup =

Motor racing competition

Seasons
- ← 1999 2001 →

The 2000 Formula Renault 2000 Eurocup season was the tenth Eurocup Formula Renault 2.0 season. The season began with non-championship round at Mugello Circuit on 16 April and finished at the Circuit Ricardo Tormo in Valencia on 10 December, after ten races. Cram Competition driver Felipe Massa claimed the championship title, taking three victories at Monza, Valencia and Magny-Cours. Charles Zwolsman Jr. finished as runner-up, losing 16 points to Massa. J.D. Motorsport's Matteo Grassotto won race at Circuit Park Zandvoort. His teammate Richard Antinucci took the first place in the next race at Spa. Other wins were scored by Markus Winkelhock, Kimi Räikkönen and Jörg Hardt.

== Calendar ==
Round	Circuit	Date	Fastest lap	Winning driver	Winning team
1	(Italy) Mugello Circuit	16 April	(United Kingdom) Danny Watts	(Italy) Matteo Grassotto	(Italy) JD Motorsport
2	(Netherlands) Circuit Park Zandvoort	14 May	(Italy) Matteo Grassotto	(Italy) Matteo Grassotto	(Italy) JD Motorsport
3	(Belgium) Circuit de Spa-Francorchamps	11 June	(Netherlands) Charles Zwolsman Jr.	(United States) Richard Antinucci	(Italy) JD Motorsport
4	(Italy) Autodromo Nazionale Monza	25 June	(Italy) Fabrizio del Monte	(Brazil) Felipe Massa	(Italy) Cram Competition
5	(United Kingdom) Donington Park	16 July	(Finland) Kimi Räikkönen	(Finland) Kimi Räikkönen	(United Kingdom) Manor Motorsport
6	(Germany) Nürburgring	27 August	(France) Eric Salignon	(Germany) Markus Winkelhock	(Germany) SL Formula Racing
7	(Belgium) Circuit de Spa-Francorchamps	24 September	(France) Renaud Derlot	(Finland) Kimi Räikkönen	(United Kingdom) Manor Motorsport
8	(Spain) Circuit Ricardo Tormo, Valencia	8 October	(Brazil) Felipe Massa	(Brazil) Felipe Massa	(Italy) Cram Competition
9	(France) Circuit de Nevers Magny-Cours	22 October	(Brazil) Felipe Massa	(Brazil) Felipe Massa	(Italy) Cram Competition
10	(Spain) Circuit Ricardo Tormo, Valencia	10 December	(Italy) Ronnie Quintarelli	(Germany) Jörg Hardt	(Austria) Walter Lechner Racing

== Driver Standings ==
Pos	Driver	Team	Points
1	(Brazil) Felipe Massa	(Italy) Cram Competition	140
2	(Netherlands) Charles Zwolsman Jr.	(Germany) Team Lauderbach	124
3	(Italy) Matteo Grassotto	(Italy) JD Motorsport	116
4	(United States) Richard Antinucci	(Italy) JD Motorsport	108
5	(Germany) Mike Schmidt	(Germany) GM Motorsport	94
6	(Germany) Markus Winkelhock	(Germany) SL Formula Racing	78
7	(Finland) Kimi Räikkönen	(United Kingdom) Manor Motorsport	62
8	(Germany) Marcel Lasée	(Austria) Walter Lechner Racing	54
9	(Netherlands) Hugo van der Ham	(Netherlands) AR Motorsport	48
10	(South Africa) Toby Scheckter	(Netherlands) AR Motorsport	40
11	(Italy) Fabrizio del Monte	(Italy) RC Motorsport	28
12	(United Kingdom) Darren Malkin	(Switzerland) Jenzer Motorsport	28
13	(France) Jean de Pourtales	(Italy) JD Motorsport	26
14	(Italy) Thomas Pichler	(Germany) GM Motorsport	24
15	(United Kingdom) Tom Sisley	(United Kingdom) Motaworld Racing	24
16	(United Kingdom) Danny Watts	(United Kingdom) Manor Motorsport	20
17	(France) Eric Salignon	(France) Graff Racing	20
18	(Italy) Andrea Belicchi	(Italy) RC Motorsport	12
19	(France) Nicolas Lapierre	(France) Tech 1 Racing	12
20	(Brazil) Augusto Farfus	(Italy) Cram Competition	10
21	(Austria) Walter Lechner Jr.	(Austria) Walter Lechner Racing	8
22	(United Kingdom) Mark McLoughlin	(United Kingdom) Motaworld Racing	8
23	(France) Julien Mélis		8
24	(Netherlands) Sebastian Visser	(Netherlands) AR Motorsport	6
25	(France) Arnaud Biet		6
26	(United States) Jason Workman	KP Motorsport	4
27	(Switzerland) Fabian Eggenberger	(Germany) Schranz Motorsport	4
28	(United Kingdom) Anthony Davidson		4
29	(France) Renaud Derlot	(France) Graff Racing	4
30	(France) Nicolas Poulain		2
