= Markus Winkelhock =

German racing driver (born 1980)

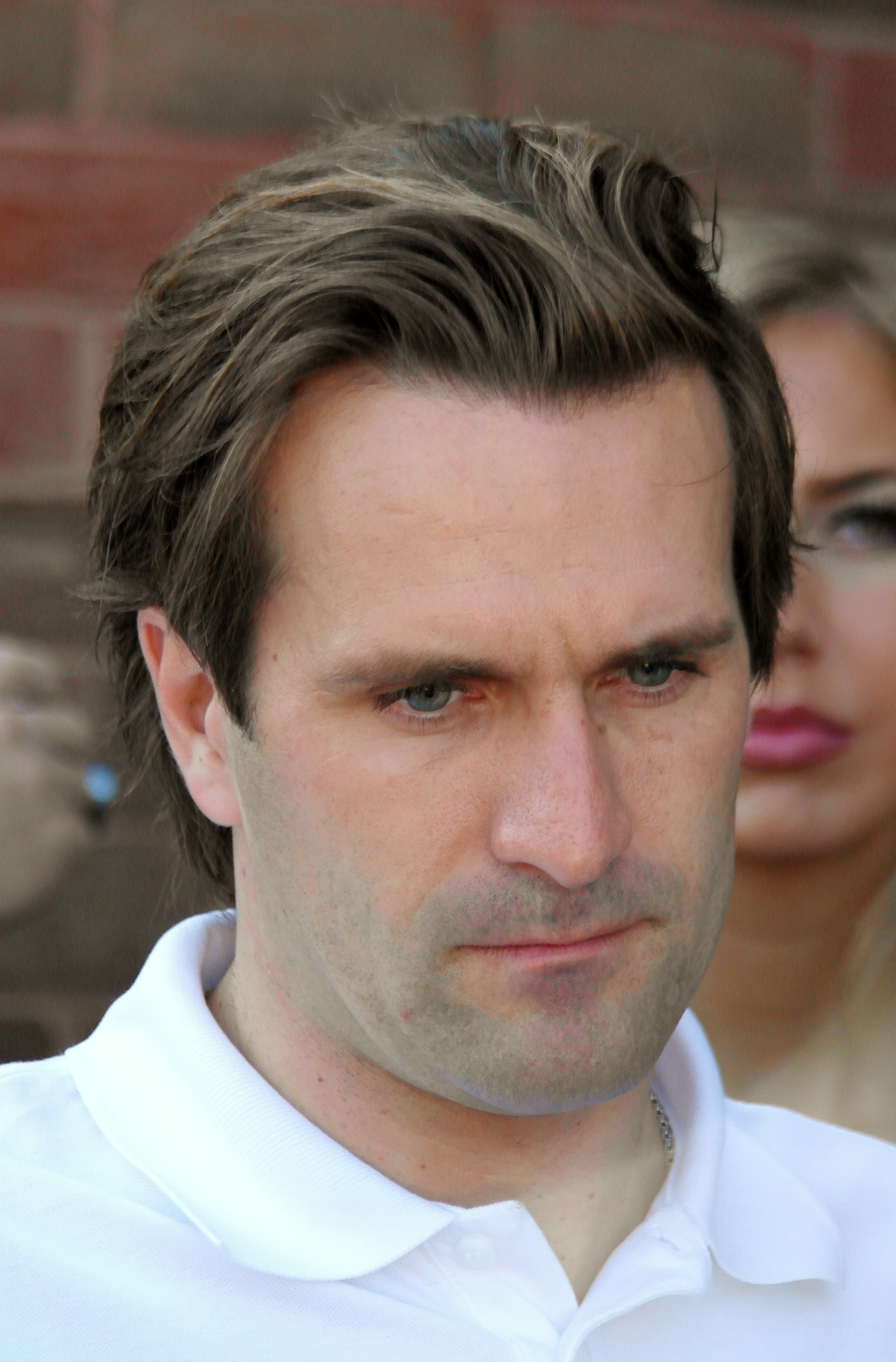
- Winkelhock at the Brands Hatch round of the 2014 Blancpain Sprint Series season.
- Born: 13 June 1980 (age 46) Stuttgart, West Germany
- Relatives: Manfred Winkelhock (father); Joachim Winkelhock (uncle); Thomas Winkelhock (uncle)

Formula One World Championship career
- Nationality: (Germany) German
- Active years: 2007
- Team: Spyker
- Entries: 1
- Championships: 0
- Wins: 0
- Podiums: 0
- Career points: 0
- Pole positions: 0
- Fastest laps: 0
- First entry: 2007 European Grand Prix

GT World Challenge Asia career
- Debut season: 2024
- Current team: Audi Sport Asia Team Phantom
- Categorisation: FIA Platinum
- Car number: 46
- Former teams: Audi Sport Asia Team Absolute
- Starts: 18
- Wins: 1
- Poles: 0
- Fastest laps: 0
- Best finish: 9th in 2024

Previous series
- 2011–12 2007 2006 2005 2004, 2007–2010 2003 2001, 2003 2001–2002 2000 2000 1999 1998: FIA GT1 World Championship; Formula One; Porsche Supercup; Formula Renault 3.5 Series; DTM; Formula 3 Euro Series; Masters of Formula 3 German F3 Championship; Formula Renault 2000 Italy; Formula Renault 2000 Eurocup; Formula Renault Germany; Formula König

Championship titles
- 2018 2017 2012: Blancpain GT Series Sprint Cup - Pro-Am; Intercontinental GT Challenge; FIA GT1 World Championship

Markus Winkelhock (German pronunciation: [ˈmaʁ.kʊs ˈvɪŋ.kl̩.hɔk]; born 13 June 1980) is a German professional racing driver. He made one Formula One start for Spyker at the 2007 European Grand Prix, where he led for several laps under heavy rain before retiring with hydraulic issues. As an Audi factory driver, Winkelhock raced in DTM, won the Nürburgring 24 Hours three times and was Intercontinental GT Challenge champion in 2017. He also won the FIA GT1 World Championship in 2012 driving a Mercedes.

He is the son of Manfred Winkelhock and nephew of Joachim Winkelhock, both of whom were Formula One drivers in the 1980s.

== Early career ==
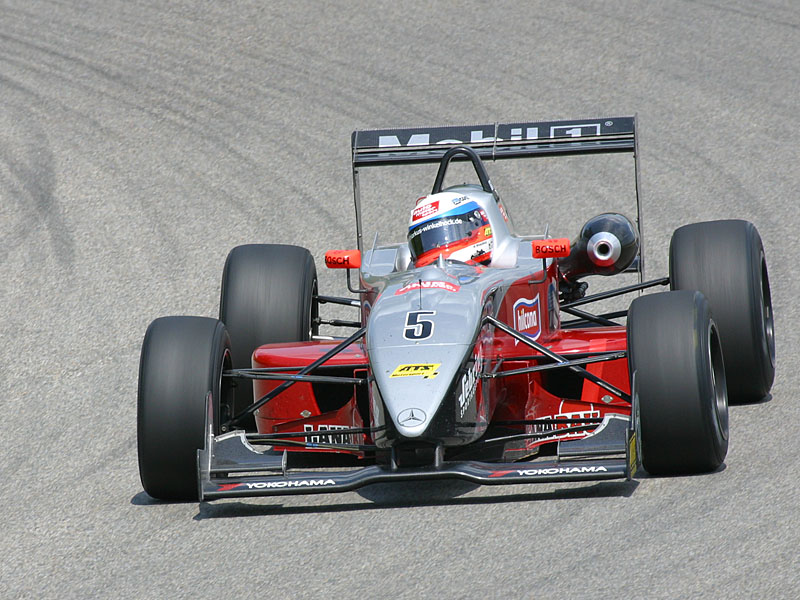
Winkelhock driving in the German F3 series in 2002.

Born in Stuttgart, Winkelhock won races in a string of junior formulae including Formula König, German Formula Renault and the Formula Renault Eurocup from 1998 to 2000.

In 2001, Winkelhock joined the German Formula 3 Championship, where he remained until the championship became the F3 Euroseries in 2003. His record was fifth overall in 2001 (three wins), seventh in 2002 (one win) and fourth in 2003 (two wins).

Winkelhock switched to touring car racing in 2004, with a season in the DTM in an AMG-Mercedes CLK. But he failed to score a point all year with the Persson team.

Winkelhock switched back to single-seater racing in 2005, joining the World Series by Renault with Draco. He won three times but there were also some less than shining moments – notably when he crashed at Monaco in qualifying and on the first lap of the race.

== Formula One ==
On 24 January 2006, Winkelhock was confirmed as a test and reserve driver for the Midland F1 team (formerly Jordan Grand Prix) for the 2006 Formula One season. He participated in Friday test sessions for the team at the Bahrain, Australian, German and Hungarian Grands Prix.

Winkelhock was re-signed for 2007 by the team, which by then had been renamed as Spyker F1. He also made a brief return to the DTM in 2007, starting three races.

Following Christijan Albers's departure from Spyker after the 2007 British Grand Prix, Winkelhock was confirmed as his replacement for the European Grand Prix on 18 July. The deal was only for one race with Sakon Yamamoto set to race for Spyker for the rest of the season.

=== 2007 European Grand Prix ===
In the race, Winkelhock started last on the 22-car grid alongside teammate Adrian Sutil. On the formation lap, with the rest of the field on dry-weather tyres, the team made a last-second decision to call Winkelhock into the pits to switch to full wet tyres. When pouring rain forced almost all the others to pit at the end of the first lap, Winkelhock was able to move into the lead, passing some cars as they pitted, and even passing Kimi Räikkönen on the track as the Finn tip-toed around to the pits, eventually building a lead of 19 seconds by the end of the second lap. By lap 4, he had a lead of 33 seconds over Ferrari's Felipe Massa in second place. As the rain got heavier, the stewards first sent out the safety car and then suspended the race following a series of spins in the first corner behind the safety car. The race restarted after the rain had eased. Winkelhock and his team chose to start on full wet tyres on a drying track in the hope of further showers, as the team expected he would be overtaken by faster cars anyway. The gamble failed and, having restarted the race from the lead, Winkelhock quickly fell down the order. He retired on lap 15 with hydraulic problems that caused a small fire. He had led for a total of six laps.

According to Bob Varsha of the Speed Channel commentary team, Winkelhock is the only driver in Formula One history to start last on the grid and lead the race in his first Grand Prix, and due to the red flag and restart, is also the only driver in Formula One history to start both last and first on the grid in the same Grand Prix. Despite his performance in the race, the Spyker team opted against giving Winkelhock a drive for the remainder of the 2007 season, instead opting for Super Aguri test driver Sakon Yamamoto.

== Post-Formula One career ==
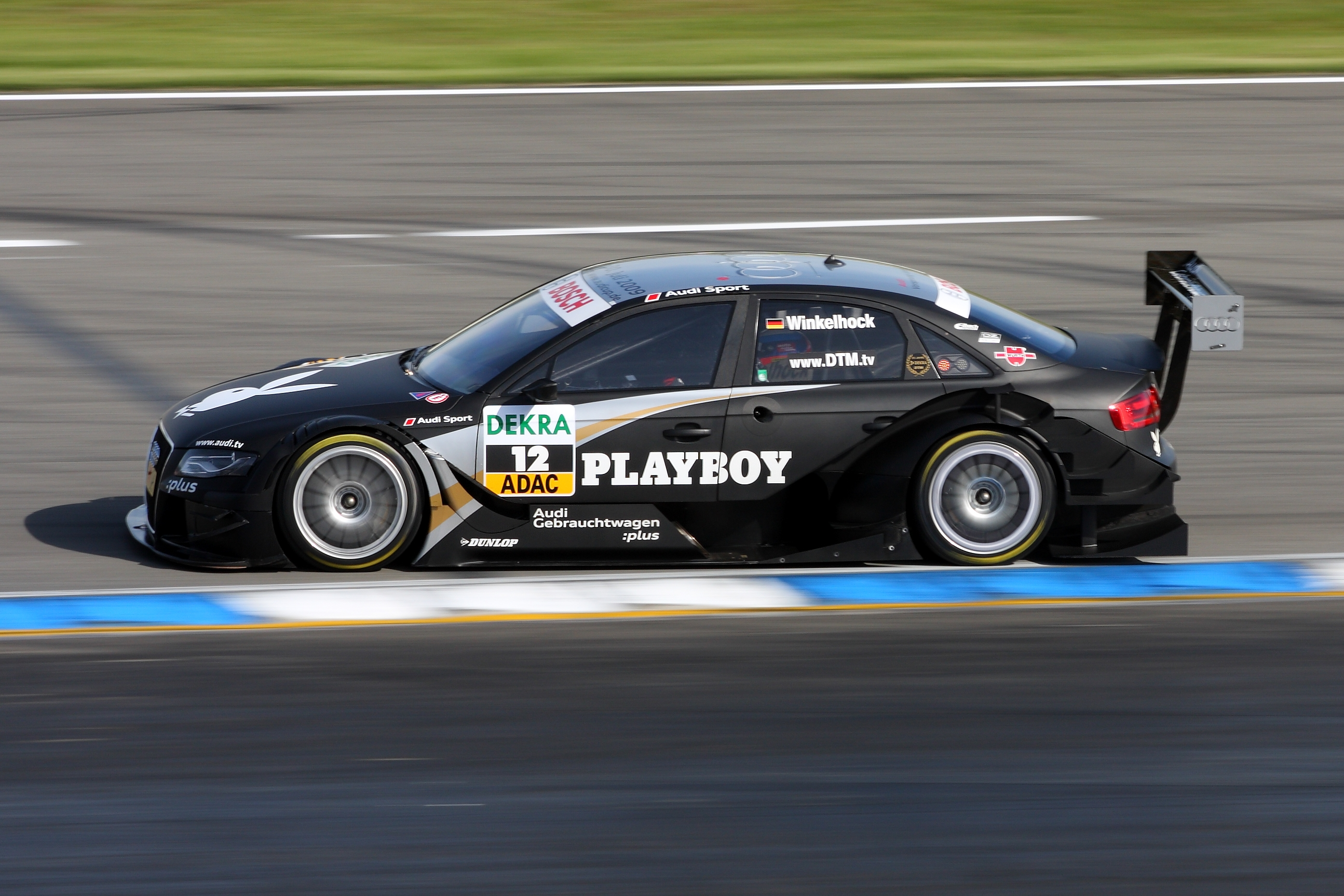
Winkelhock driving for Audi (Team Rosberg) in the 2009 Deutsche Tourenwagen Masters season at the Hockenheimring.

Winkelhock returned to the Deutsche Tourenwagen Masters after he lost his Spyker seat, and has remained in the series, driving for Team Rosberg, for 2008 (12th), 2009 (tenth) and 2010 (12th).

In 2011, Winkelhock competed in the FIA GT1 World Championship for the All-Inkl.com Münnich Motorsport team alongside team manager Marc Basseng driving a Lamborghini. They won the championship the following year, the team having switched to the Mercedes SLS due to a change in the regulations.

Winkelhock was to move with Münnich Motorsport to the World Touring Car Championship for 2013, however he left the team before the start of the season in order to focus on his GT racing commitments, and was replaced by defending champion Robert Huff.

Since 2013, Winkelhock has more or less settled in the Blancpain Endurance Series and also won the 2017 24 Hours of Nürburgring sportscar race.

Winkelhock also made a brief DTM comeback midway through the 2021 season with Abt Sportsline, where he replaced Sophia Flörsch for the Nürburgring round due to her Le Mans commitments.

== Racing record ==
=== Career summary ===
Season	Series	Team	Races	Wins	Poles	Points	Position
1998	Formula König	?	9	3	2	161	**2nd**
1999	Formula Renault Germany	SL Formula Racing	8	2	1	72	4th
1999	Formula Renault Germany	Lechner Racing	8	2	1	72	4th
2000	Formula Renault 2000 Eurocup	SL Formula Racing	?	1	?	78	6th
2000	Formula Renault 2000 Italy	SL Racing	4	0	0	8	21st
2001	German Formula 3 Championship	Mücke Motorsport	20	3	2	141	5th
2001	Masters of Formula 3	ADAC Berlin-Brandenburg	1	0	0	N/A	36th
2002	German Formula 3 Championship	Mücke Motorsport	18	1	2	28	7th
2003	Formula 3 Euro Series	Mücke Motorsport	20	2	1	71	4th
2003	Masters of Formula 3	ADAC Berlin-Brandenburg	1	0	0	N/A	6th
2004	Deutsche Tourenwagen Masters	Persson Motorsport	10	0	0	0	19th
2005	Formula Renault 3.5 Series	Draco Multiracing USA	17	3	1	114	**3rd**
2006	Formula One	MF1 Racing	Test driver				
2006	Porsche Supercup	Porsche AG	1	0	0	0	NC
2007	Formula One	Etihad Aldar Spyker F1 Team	1	0	0	0	NC
2007	Deutsche Tourenwagen Masters	Abt Sportsline	2	0	0	0	19th
2007	Deutsche Tourenwagen Masters	Futurecom TME	5	0	0	0	19th
2008	Deutsche Tourenwagen Masters	Team Rosberg	11	0	0	6	11th
2009	Deutsche Tourenwagen Masters	Team Rosberg	10	0	0	11	10th
2010	Deutsche Tourenwagen Masters	Team Rosberg	11	0	0	7	12th
2010	24 Hours of Nürburgring - SP9	Phoenix Racing	1	1	0	N/A	**1st**
2011	GT1 World Championship	All-Inkl.com Münnich Motorsport	20	3	0	102	5th
2011	ADAC GT Masters	Novidem Swissracing Team	8	0	0	0	NC
2011	24 Hours of Nürburgring - SP9	Audi Sport Team Phoenix	1	0	?	N/A	**2nd**
2012	GT1 World Championship	All-Inkl.com Münnich Motorsport	18	1	0	145	**1st**
2012	24 Hours of Nürburgring - SP9	Audi Sport Team Phoenix	1	1	0	N/A	**1st**
2013	Blancpain Endurance Series	Phoenix Racing	5	0	0	12	23rd
2013	FIA GT Series	Phoenix Racing	2	0	0	0	NC†
2013	ADAC GT Masters	Prosperia C.Abt Racing	14	0	1	110	10th
2013	Rolex Sports Car Series - GT	Audi Sport Customer Racing	1	0	0	24	54th
2013	24 Hours of Nürburgring - SP9	G-Drive Racing by Phoenix	1	0	0	N/A	5th
2014	Blancpain Sprint Series	Phoenix Racing	14	0	0	32	11th
2014	Blancpain Endurance Series	Phoenix Racing	1	1	0	43	10th
2014	24 Hours of Nürburgring - SP9	Phoenix Racing	1	1	0	N/A	**1st**
2014	United SportsCar Championship - GTD	Flying Lizard Motorsports	2	0	0	34	56th
2014	World Rallycross Championship	EKS RX	1	0	0	0	56th
2015	Blancpain Sprint Series	Phoenix Racing	14	0	0	48	9th
2015	Blancpain Endurance Series	Phoenix Racing	4	0	0	0	NC
2015	Blancpain Endurance Series	Audi Sport Team WRT	1	0	0	0	NC
2015	United SportsCar Championship - GTD	Flying Lizard Motorsports	1	0	0	1	58th
2015	FFSA GT Championship	Saintéloc Junior Team	2	0	0	0	NC
2015	24 Hours of Nürburgring - SP9	Audi Sport Team Phoenix	1	0	0	N/A	DNF
2016	ADAC GT Masters	Phoenix Racing	10	0	0	22	30th
2016	Blancpain GT Series Sprint Cup	Phoenix Racing	8	0	0	0	NC
2016	Blancpain GT Series Endurance Cup	Phoenix Racing	1	0	0	18	21st
2016	Intercontinental GT Challenge	Phoenix Racing	1	0	0	33	5th
2016	Intercontinental GT Challenge	Audi Sport Team Phoenix	2	0	0	33	5th
2016	24H Series - A6	Car Collection Motorsport					
2016	24 Hours of Nürburgring - SP9	Audi Sport Team Phoenix	1	0	0	N/A	DNF
2017	ADAC GT Masters	BWT Mücke Motorsport	12	0	0	14	33rd
2017	Blancpain GT Series Sprint Cup	Belgian Audi Club Team WRT	9	1	0	74	**2nd**
2017	Blancpain GT Series Endurance Cup	Belgian Audi Club Team WRT	1	0	0	30	8th
2017	Blancpain GT Series Endurance Cup	Audi Sport Team Saintéloc	2	1	0	30	8th
2017	Intercontinental GT Challenge	Jamec Pem Racing	1	0	0	50	**1st**
2017	Intercontinental GT Challenge	Audi Sport Team Saintéloc	1	1	0	50	**1st**
2017	Intercontinental GT Challenge	Audi Sport Team Magnus	1	1	0	50	**1st**
2017	24 Hours of Nürburgring - SP9	Audi Sport Team Land / Land-Motorsport	1	1	0	N/A	**1st**
2018	ADAC GT Masters	BWT Mücke Motorsport	14	0	0	42	14th
2018	24H GT Series - A6	BWT Mücke Motorsport					
2018	Blancpain GT Series Sprint Cup	Saintéloc Racing	10	0	0	1	25th
2018	Blancpain GT Series Sprint Cup - Pro-Am	Saintéloc Racing	10	5	2	134.5	**1st**
2018	Blancpain GT Series Endurance Cup	Saintéloc Racing	5	0	0	27	18th
2018	Blancpain GT Series Endurance Cup - Pro-Am	Saintéloc Racing	3	0	0	36	12th
2018	IMSA SportsCar Championship - GTD	Magnus Racing	1	0	0	25	52nd
2018	Intercontinental GT Challenge	Audi Sport Team MPC	1	0	0	58	4th
2018	Intercontinental GT Challenge	Audi Sport Team Saintéloc	1	1	0	58	4th
2018	Intercontinental GT Challenge	Audi Sport Team Absolute Racing	1	0	0	58	4th
2018	Intercontinental GT Challenge	Audi Sport Team WRT	1	0	0	58	4th
2018	24 Hours of Nürburgring - SP9	Audi Sport Team BWT	1	0	0	N/A	11th
2019	ADAC GT Masters	BWT Mücke Motorsport	14	0	0	80	12th
2019	Blancpain GT World Challenge Europe	Saintéloc Racing	9	0	0	3	22nd
2019	Blancpain GT Series Endurance Cup	Saintéloc Racing	4	0	0	12	19th
2019	Blancpain GT Series Endurance Cup - Pro-Am	Saintéloc Racing	3	0	0	30	11th
2019	IMSA SportsCar Championship - GTD	Moorespeed	1	0	0	20	56th
2019	Intercontinental GT Challenge	Audi Sport Team Valvoline	1	0	0	40	11th
2019	Intercontinental GT Challenge	Audi Sport Team Land	2	0	0	40	11th
2019	Intercontinental GT Challenge	Audi Sport Team Saintéloc	1	0	0	40	11th
2019	Intercontinental GT Challenge	Audi Sport Team Absolute Racing	1	0	0	40	11th
2019	24H GT Series - A6	BWT Mücke Motorsport					
2019	24H GT Series - A6	Car Collection Motorsport					
2019	24 Hours of Nürburgring - SP9	Audi Sport Team Car Collection	1	0	0	N/A	**3rd**
2020	GT World Challenge Europe Endurance Cup	Saintéloc Racing	4	0	0	22	15th
2020	ADAC GT Masters	EFP Car Collection by TECE	6	0	0	0	NC†
2020	IMSA SportsCar Championship - GTD	Team Hardpoint	1	0	0	18	54th
2020	Intercontinental GT Challenge	Audi Sport Team Valvoline	1	0	0	26	9th
2020	Intercontinental GT Challenge	Audi Sport Team Hardpoint WRT	1	0	0	26	9th
2020	Intercontinental GT Challenge	Audi Sport Team Saintéloc Racing	1	0	0	26	9th
2020	Intercontinental GT Challenge	Audi Sport Team WRT	1	0	0	26	9th
2020	24H GT Series - GT3	Car Collection Motorsport					
2020	24 Hours of Nürburgring - SP9	Audi Sport Team Car Collection	1	0	0	N/A	**2nd**
2021	ADAC GT Masters	Car Collection Motorsport	14	0	0	29	25th
2021	GT World Challenge Europe Sprint Cup	ROFGO Racing with Team WRT	2	0	0	1	33rd
2021	GT World Challenge Europe Sprint Cup	Saintéloc Racing	4	0	0	1	33rd
2021	GT World Challenge Europe Endurance Cup	Saintéloc Racing	5	0	0	11	20th
2021	Deutsche Tourenwagen Masters	Team Abt Sportsline	2	0	0	0	23rd
2021	Intercontinental GT Challenge	Audi Sport Team Saintéloc Racing	3	1	0	50	**2nd**
2021	24H GT Series - GT3	Attempto Racing					
2021	24H GT Series - GT3	Rutronik Racing by TECE					
2021	24 Hours of Nürburgring - SP9	Audi Sport Team Car Collection	1	0	0	N/A	5th
2022	ADAC GT Masters	Car Collection Motorsport	14	0	0	26	26th
2022	GT World Challenge Europe Endurance Cup	Attempto Racing	5	0	0	19	20th
2022	Intercontinental GT Challenge	The Bend Motorsport Park Team Valvoline					
2022	Intercontinental GT Challenge	Audi Sport Team Attempto					
2022	24 Hours of Nürburgring - SP9	Scherer Sport Team Phoenix	1	0	0	N/A	5th
2023	GT Winter Series	Phoenix Racing	?	?	?	8	85th
2023	24 Hours of Nürburgring - SP9	Scherer Sport PHX	1	0	0	N/A	11th
2023-24	Middle East Trophy - GT3	Goroyan RT by Car Collection Motorsport					
2023-24	Middle East Trophy - GT3	Eastalent Racing Team					
2024	GT World Challenge Asia	Audi Sport Asia Team Absolute	10	1	0	68	9th
2024	Nürburgring Langstrecken-Serie - SP9	Scherer Sport PHX	2	0	0		
2024	24 Hours of Nürburgring - SP9	Scherer Sport PHX	1	0	0	N/A	8th
2025	GT World Challenge Asia	Audi Sport Asia Team Phantom	10	0	0	24	24th
2025	Nürburgring Langstrecken-Serie - SP9	Scherer Sport PHX					
2025	24 Hours of Nürburgring - SP9	Scherer Sport PHX	1	0	0	N/A	DNF
2026	GT World Challenge Europe Endurance Cup	Eastalent Racing	5	0	0	12	22nd
2026	Nürburgring Langstrecken-Serie - SP-X	HWA Engineering Speed					

† As Winkelhock was a guest driver, he was ineligible for points.
^{*} Season still in progress.

=== Complete German Formula Three Championship results ===
(key) (Races in bold indicate pole position) (Races in italics indicate fastest lap)

Year	Entrant	Chassis	Engine	1	2	3	4	5	6	7	8	9	10	11	12	13	14	15	16	17	18	19	20	DC	Points
2001	ADAC Berlin-Brandenburg	Dallara F301	Opel	HOC1; 1; 7	HOC1; 2; 6	NÜR1; 1; 3	NÜR1; 2; 3	**OSC**; **1**; 3	OSC; 2; 13	SAC; 1; 1	SAC; 2 Ret	NOR; 1; 11	NOR; 2 Ret	HOC2; 1; 21	HOC2; 2; 21	LAU; 1; 1	LAU; 2; 6	NÜR2; 1; 3	NÜR2; 2; 2	**A1R**; **1** Ret	A1R; 2 Ret	HOC3; 1; 1	HOC3; 2 Ret	5th	141
2002	Mücke Motorsport	Dallara F302	Mercedes	HOC1; 1; 5	HOC1; 2; 5	**NÜR1**; **1** C	NÜR1; 2 C	SAC; 1; 5	SAC; 2 Ret	NOR; 1; 7	NOR; 2; 19	LAU; 1; 10	LAU; 2; 6	HOC2; 1; 4	HOC2; 2; 21†	NÜR2; 1; 21	**NÜR2**; **2**; 1	A1R; 1; 4	A1R; 2; 15	ZAN; 1; 10	ZAN; 2; 13	HOC3; 1 Ret	HOC3; 2; 3	7th	28

=== Complete Formula 3 Euro Series results ===
(key) (Races in bold indicate pole position) (Races in italics indicate fastest lap)

Year	Entrant	Chassis	Engine	1	2	3	4	5	6	7	8	9	10	11	12	13	14	15	16	17	18	19	20	DC	Points
2003	ADAC Berlin-Brandenburg	Dallara F302/012	HWA-Mercedes	HOC; 1; 3	HOC; 2; 4	ADR; 1 Ret	ADR; 2; 17	PAU; 1; 21	PAU; 2 Ret	NOR; 1 Ret	NOR; 2; 5	LMS; 1; 8	LMS; 2; 18	NÜR; 1; 1	NÜR; 2; 2	A1R; 1; 4	A1R; 2; 6	ZAN; 1; 4	ZAN; 2; 4	**HOC**; **1** Ret	HOC; 2; 2	MAG; 1; 1	MAG; 2; 9	4th	71

=== Complete Formula Renault 3.5 Series results ===
(key) (Races in bold indicate pole position) (Races in italics indicate fastest lap)

Year	Entrant	1	2	3	4	5	6	7	8	9	10	11	12	13	14	15	16	17	DC	Points
2005	Draco Multiracing USA	ZOL; 1 NC	ZOL; 2; 3	MON; 1 DNS	VAL; 1; 11	VAL; 2; 12	**LMS**; **1**; 1	LMS; 2; 5	BIL; 1 Ret	BIL; 2; 7	OSC; 1 Ret	OSC; 2; 3	DON; 1; 5	DON; 2; 1	EST; 1; 4	EST; 2; 2	MNZ; 1; 3	MNZ; 2; 1	3rd	114

=== Complete Formula One results ===
(key)

Year	Entrant	Chassis	Engine	1	2	3	4	5	6	7	8	9	10	11	12	13	14	15	16	17	18	WDC	Points
2006	MF1 Racing	Midland M16	Toyota RVX-06 2.4 V8	BHR; TD	MAL	AUS; TD	SMR	EUR	ESP	MON	GBR	CAN	USA	FRA	GER; TD	HUN; TD	TUR	ITA	CHN	JPN	BRA	–	–
2007	Etihad Aldar Spyker F1 Team	Spyker F8-VII	Ferrari 056H 2.4 V8	AUS	MAL	BHR	ESP	MON	CAN	USA	FRA	GBR	EUR; Ret	HUN	TUR	ITA	BEL	JPN	CHN	BRA		NC	0

=== Complete Deutsche Tourenwagen Masters results ===
(key) (Races in bold indicate pole position) (Races in italics indicate fastest lap)

Year	Team	Car	1	2	3	4	5	6	7	8	9	10	11	12	13	14	15	16	Pos.	Points
2004	Persson Motorsport	AMG-Mercedes CLK-DTM 2003	HOC; 15	EST; 17	ADR; Ret	LAU; 13	NOR; Ret	SHA; 9‡	NÜR; Ret	OSC; 16	ZAN; 14	BRN; 18	HOC; 13						19th	0
2007	Abt Sportsline	Audi A4 DTM 2007	HOC	OSC	LAU; Ret	BRH; 14	NOR												19th	0
2007	Futurecom TME	Audi A4 DTM 2005						MUG; 9	ZAN; 13	NÜR; Ret	CAT; 12†	HOC; 13							19th	0
2008	Team Rosberg	Audi A4 DTM 2007	HOC; 12	OSC; 6	MUG; 7	LAU; Ret	NOR; 11	ZAN; 8	NÜR; 9	BRH; 11	CAT; 12	BUG; 11	HOC; Ret						11th	6
2009	Team Rosberg	Audi A4 DTM 2008	HOC; 4	LAU; Ret	NOR; 13	ZAN; DSQ	OSC; Ret	NÜR; 4	BRH; 18†	CAT; Ret	DIJ; 10	HOC; 8							10th	11
2010	Team Rosberg	Audi A4 DTM 2008	HOC; 15	VAL; 15†	LAU; 10	NOR; Ret	NÜR; Ret	ZAN; DNS	BRH; 15†	OSC; Ret	HOC; Ret	ADR; 4	SHA; 7						12th	7
2021	Abt Sportsline	Audi R8 LMS Evo	MNZ; 1	MNZ; 2	LAU; 1	LAU; 2	ZOL; 1	ZOL; 2	NÜR; 1; 16	NÜR; 2; 14	RBR; 1	RBR; 2	ASS; 1	ASS; 2	HOC; 1	HOC; 2	NOR; 1	NOR; 2	23rd	0

^{†} - Driver did not finish, but completed 90% of the race distance. ^{‡} - Shanghai was a non-championship round.

=== Complete GT1 World Championship results ===
Year	Team	Car	1	2	3	4	5	6	7	8	9	10	11	12	13	14	15	16	17	18	19	20	Pos	Points
2011	All-Inkl.com Münnich Motorsport	Lamborghini Murciélago LP670 R-SV	ABU; QR; 6	ABU; CR; 3	ZOL; QR; 1	ZOL; CR; 1	ALG; QR; 7	ALG; CR; 6	SAC; QR; 9	SAC; CR; Ret	SIL; QR; Ret	SIL; CR; 5	NAV; QR; 1	NAV; CR; 2	PRI; QR; 7	PRI; CR; 8	ORD; QR; DSQ	ORD; CR; 8	BEI; QR; 12	BEI; CR; Ret	SAN; QR; 6	SAN; CR; Ret	5th	102
2012	All-Inkl.com Münnich Motorsport	Mercedes-Benz SLS AMG GT3	NOG; QR; 6	NOG; CR; 3	ZOL; QR; 6	ZOL; CR; 9	NAV; QR; 5	NAV; QR; 2	SVK; QR; 4	SVK; CR; 3	ALG; QR; 1	ALG; CR; 2	SVK; QR; 3	SVK; CR; 2	MOS; QR; 2	MOS; CR; 5	NUR; QR; 3	NUR; CR; 2	DON; QR; 5	DON; CR; DSQ			1st	145

=== Complete GT World Challenge Europe results ===
==== GT World Challenge Europe Endurance Cup ====
Year	Team	Car	Class	1	2	3	4	5	6	7	Pos.	Points
2013	Phoenix Racing	Audi R8 LMS ultra	Pro	MNZ; 6	SIL; 9	LEC; 12	SPA; 6H; 14	SPA; 12H; 16	SPA; 24H; Ret	NÜR; 29	23rd	12
2014	Belgian Audi Club Team WRT	Audi R8 LMS ultra	Pro	MNZ	SIL	LEC	SPA; 6H; 4	SPA; 12H; 1	SPA; 24H; 1	NÜR	10th	43
2015	Phoenix Racing	Audi R8 LMS ultra	Pro	MNZ; 21	SIL; 34	LEC; 40				NÜR; 30	NC	0
2015	Audi Sport Team WRT	Audi R8 LMS ultra	Pro				SPA; 6H; 28	SPA; 12H; 21	SPA; 24H; 21		NC	0
2016	Audi Sport Team Phoenix	Audi R8 LMS	Pro	MNZ	SIL	LEC	SPA; 6H; 2	SPA; 12H; 2	SPA; 24H; 50	NÜR	21st	18
2017	Belgian Audi Club Team WRT	Audi R8 LMS	Pro	MNZ; 12	SIL						8th	30
2017	Audi Sport Team Saintéloc	Audi R8 LMS	Pro			LEC; 9	SPA; 6H; 7	SPA; 12H; 13	SPA; 24H; 1	CAT	8th	30
2018	Saintéloc Racing	Audi R8 LMS	Pro-Am	MNZ; 27	SIL; 35					CAT; 24	12th	36
2018	Audi Sport Team Saintéloc	Audi R8 LMS	Pro			LEC; 6	SPA; 6H; 16	SPA; 12H; 4	SPA; 24H; 4		18th	27
2019	Saintéloc Racing	Audi R8 LMS Evo	Pro-Am	MNZ; 29	SIL; Ret	LEC; 30				CAT	11th	30
2019	Audi Sport Team Saintéloc	Audi R8 LMS Evo	Pro				SPA; 6H; 12	SPA; 12H; 10	SPA; 24H; 4		19th	12
2020	Saintéloc Racing	Audi R8 LMS Evo	Pro	IMO; 5	NÜR; 9	SPA; 6H; 15	SPA; 12H; 8	SPA; 24H; 6	LEC; 12		15th	22
2021	Saintéloc Racing	Audi R8 LMS Evo	Pro	MNZ; 9	LEC; 10	SPA; 6H; 17	SPA; 12H; 11	SPA; 24H; 6	NÜR; 17		20th	11
2021	Saintéloc Racing	Audi R8 LMS Evo II	INV							CAT; 9	NC‡	0‡
2022	Attempto Racing	Audi R8 LMS Evo II	Pro	IMO; Ret	LEC; 10	SPA; 6H; 36	SPA; 12H; 26	SPA; 24H; 12	HOC; 2	CAT; Ret	20th	19
2026	Eastalent Racing	Audi R8 LMS Evo II	Pro	LEC; 15	MNZ; 20	SPA; 6H; 1	SPA; 12H; 51	SPA; 24H; Ret	NÜR; Ret	ALG; Ret	22nd	12

^{‡} As Winkelhock was a guest driver, he was ineligible to score points.

==== GT World Challenge Europe Sprint Cup ====
Year	Team	Car	Class	1	2	3	4	5	6	7	8	9	10	11	12	13	14	Pos.	Points
2013	Phoenix Racing	Audi R8 LMS ultra	Pro	NOG; QR	NOG; CR	ZOL; QR	ZOL; CR	ZAN; QR	ZAN; CR	SVK; QR	SVK; CR	NAV; QR	NAV; CR	BAK; QR; 9	BAK; CR; 12			NC‡	0‡
2014	Phoenix Racing	Audi R8 LMS ultra	Pro	NOG; QR; 2	NOG; CR; Ret	BRH; QR; 5	BRH; CR; Ret	ZAN; QR; Ret	ZAN; CR; 11	SVK; QR; 15	SVK; CR; Ret	ALG; QR; Ret	ALG; CR; 6	ZOL; QR; 16	ZOL; CR; 18	BAK; QR; 6	BAK; CR; 3	11th	32
2015	Phoenix Racing	Audi R8 LMS ultra	Pro	NOG; QR; Ret	NOG; CR; 8	BRH; QR; 6	BRH; CR; 8	ZOL; QR; 4	ZOL; CR; 5	MOS; QR; 10†	MOS; CR; 6†	ALG; QR; 3	ALG; CR; 2	MIS; QR; 12	MIS; CR; 12	ZAN; QR; 3	ZAN; CR; Ret	9th	48
2016	Phoenix Racing	Audi R8 LMS	Pro	MIS; QR; 15	MIS; CR; 27	BRH; QR; 13	BRH; CR; 11	NÜR; QR; 21	NÜR; CR; 22	HUN; QR; WD	HUN; CR; WD	CAT; QR; Ret	CAT; CR; 16					NC	0
2017	Belgian Audi Club Team WRT	Audi R8 LMS	Pro	MIS; QR; Ret	MIS; CR; DNS	BRH; QR; 11	BRH; CR; 3	ZOL; QR; 3	ZOL; CR; 1	HUN; QR; 7	HUN; CR; 5	NÜR; QR; 5	NÜR; CR; 2					2nd	74
2018	Saintéloc Racing	Audi R8 LMS	Pro-Am	ZOL; 1; 15	ZOL; 2; 15	BRH; 1; 17	**BRH**; **2**; 11	MIS; 1; 11	**MIS**; **2**; 9	HUN; 1; 18	HUN; 2; 19	NÜR; 1; 12	NÜR; 2; 15					1st	134.5
2019	Saintéloc Racing	Audi R8 LMS	Pro	BRH; 1 Ret	BRH; 2 Ret	MIS; 1 Ret	MIS; 2 Ret	ZAN; 1 Ret	ZAN; 2 DNS	NÜR; 1; 18	NÜR; 2; 7	HUN; 1; 19	HUN; 2; 12					22nd	3
2021	ROFGO Racing with Team WRT	Audi R8 LMS Evo	Pro	MAG; 1	MAG; 2	ZAN; 1; 16	ZAN; 2; 18											33rd	1
2021	Saintéloc Racing	Audi R8 LMS Evo	Pro					MIS; 1; 15	MIS; 2; 15	BRH; 1	BRH; 2	VAL; 1; 13	VAL; 2; 9					33rd	1

^{‡} As Winkelhock was a guest driver, he was ineligible to score points.
^{†} Winkelhock was ineligible to score points during the Moscow weekend due to Nikolaus Mayr-Melnhof's absence.

=== Complete FIA World Rallycross Championship results ===
==== Supercar ====
Year	Entrant	Car	1	2	3	4	5	6	7	8	9	10	11	12	Pos	Points
2014	EKS RX	Audi S1	POR	GBR	NOR	FIN; 24	SWE	BEL	CAN	FRA	GER	ITA	TUR	ARG	57th	0

=== Complete IMSA SportsCar Championship results ===
(key) (Races in bold indicate pole position; races in italics indicate fastest lap)

Year	Entrant	Class	Make	Engine	1	2	3	4	5	6	7	8	9	10	11	Rank	Points
2014	Flying Lizard Motorsports	GTD	Audi R8 LMS ultra	Audi 5.2L V10	DAY; 2	SEB; 8	LGA	DET	WGL	MOS	IND	ELK	VIR	COA	COA	56th	34
2015	Flying Lizard Motorsports	GTD	Audi R8 LMS ultra	Audi 5.2L V10	DAY; 10†	SEB	LGA	BEL	WGL	LIM	ELK	VIR	AUS	ATL		58th	1
2018	Magnus Racing	GTD	Audi R8 LMS	Audi 5.2 L V10	DAY; 6	SEB	MOH	BEL	WGL	MOS	LIM	ELK	VIR	LGA	PET	52nd	26
2019	Moorespeed	GTD	Audi R8 LMS Evo	Audi 5.2 L V10	DAY; 11	SEB	MDO	DET	WGL	MOS	LIM	ELK	VIR	LGA	PET	56th	20
2020	Team Hardpoint	GTD	Audi R8 LMS Evo	Audi 5.2 L V10	DAY	DAY	SEB	ELK	VIR	ATL	MDO	CLT	PET; 13	LGA	SEB	54th	18

^{†} Winkelhock did not complete sufficient laps in order to score full points.

Sporting positions
Preceded by Michael Krumm; Lucas Luhr	FIA GT1 World Championship; Champion; 2012; With: Marc Basseng	Succeeded by None (Series ended)
Preceded by Laurens Vanthoor	Intercontinental GT Challenge; Champion; 2017	Succeeded by Tristan Vautier
Preceded by Daniel Keilwitz; Alexander Mattschull	Blancpain GT Series Sprint Cup; Pro-Am Champion; 2018; With: Nyls Stievenart	Succeeded by Phil Keen; Hiroshi Hamaguchi (GT World Challenge Europe)
Preceded by Alexander Mattschull	Blancpain GT Series; Pro-Am Champion; 2018; With: Nyls Stievenart	Succeeded by Andrea Bertolini; Louis Machiels
