= Mercedes-Benz 500 E =

Mercedes-Benz 500 E / E 500
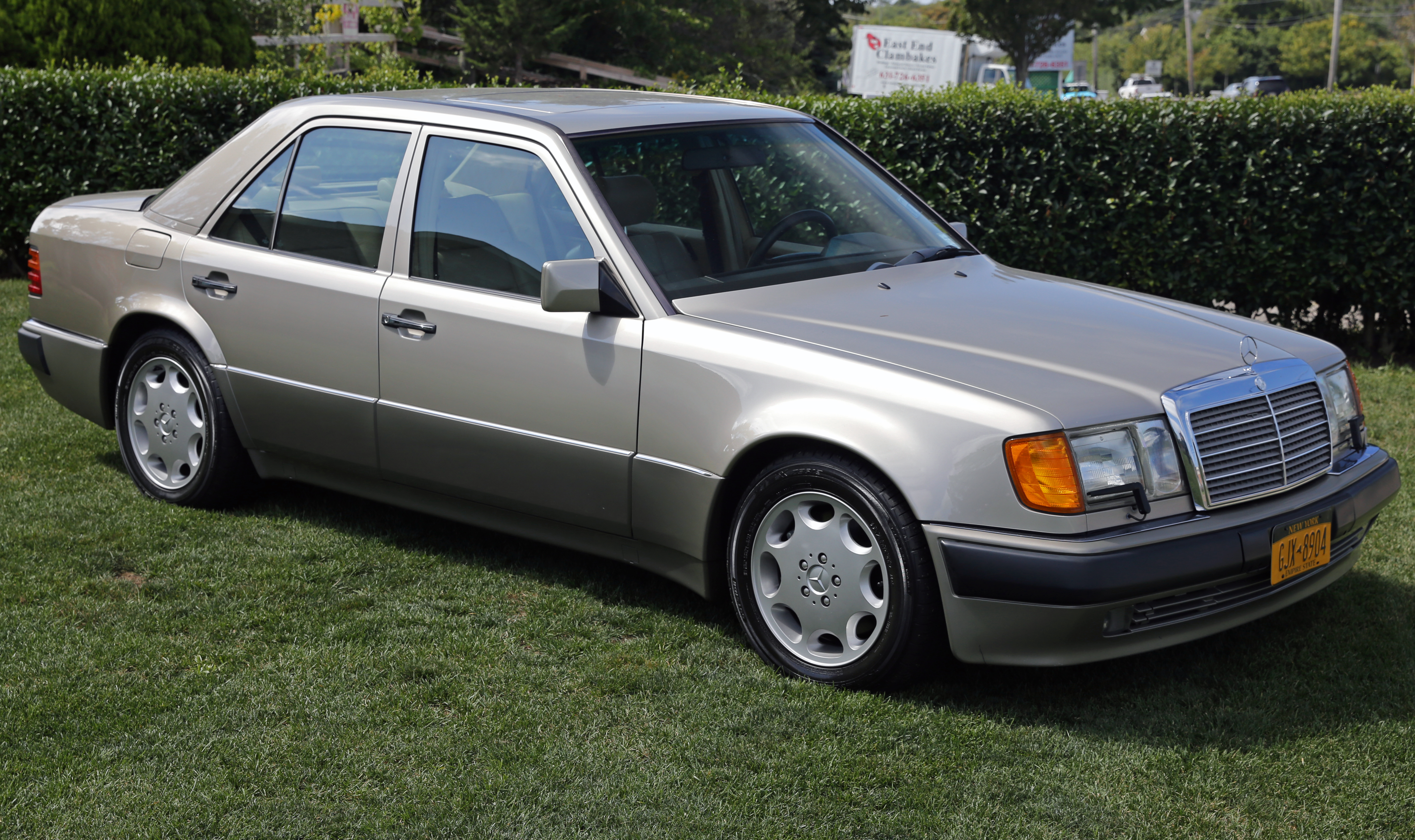

Overview
- Manufacturer: Daimler-Benz and Porsche
- Production: February 1991–1994
- Assembly: Sindelfingen and Zuffenhausen, Germany
- Designer: Bruno Sacco, Michael Hölscher, Michael Mönig

Body and chassis
- Class: Executive car
- Body style: 4-door sedan
- Related: Mercedes-Benz W124

Powertrain
- Engine: 5.0 L M119 V8
- Transmission: 4-speed automatic

Dimensions
- Wheelbase: 2,800 mm (110.2 in)
- Length: 4,750 mm (187.0 in)
- Width: 1,796 mm (70.7 in)
- Height: 1,410 mm (55.5 in)
- Curb weight: 1,710 kg (3,770 lb)

Chronology
- Successor: Mercedes-Benz E 50/55/63 AMG

The Mercedes-Benz 500 E (1991–1993; 1993–1995 sold as E 500; type W124.036) is a high-performance version of the W124 sold by Mercedes-Benz from 1991 to 1995. The 500 E was created in close cooperation with Porsche. With its engineering department being fully occupied with the development of the new W140 S-Class, Mercedes-Benz commissioned Porsche in 1989 to redesign the W124 chassis along with the necessary changes to the suspension system and drivetrain as to accommodate the wider 5-litre M119 V8. A problem was discovered on the W124 assembly line in Sindelfingen: the redesigned front wings were too wide to fit through certain stations along the assembly line. Rather than do the expensive physical changes, Mercedes-Benz organised the new assembly line at Porsche‘s manufacturing plants specifically for 500 E. This arrangement had a strong benefit for Porsche during its financial crisis brought on from the crippling metalworker strikes and costly engineering and development work on 959.

The 500 E production was divided into two assembly lines at separate locations. The components for assembling the chassis was shipped to Porsche‘s "Reutter-Bau" plant in Zuffenhausen to be assembled by hand. The completed chassis was shipped to the Sindelfingen plants to be painted; once the painted chassis was inspected and signed off, they were shipped again to Zuffenhausen for the final assembly. The completed 500 E were shipped to Sindelfingen for the final inspection and prepared to be delivered to the customers. This process took full eighteen days.

Design began in 1989. Called '500 E' through to model year 1993, for model year 1994 it was face-lifted along with the rest of the range and renamed to 'E 500'. The chassis constructed by Porsche was also used to produce the 400 E (W124.034), that was technically identical to its big brother, save its 4.2L V8 also used in the S-Class and some other minor changes. The 400 E (later renamed 'E 420') was produced in Sindelfingen, since it lacked the widened wings and thus was perfectly understated as it looked like one of its lesser siblings.

In Germany, the 500 E customer ordering began in late 1990, making its first appearance in the Mercedes-Benz 1 October 1990 pricelist, with a retail price of DM134,520. Production began in February 1991, with German sales starting in the spring of 1991. 2 January 1993, the price had risen to DM145,590, and would stay at it until the car went off the market in late 1994, it was last available in the 1 August 1994 pricelist. In the United States, the car first became available as a 1992 model with a retail price of $81,800 and was available until May 1994.

== Specifications and general information ==
The 500 E had a naturally aspirated 5.0L V8 engine derived from the 500 SL (R129) roadster. Sports car braking performance also came from SL components: front SL 500 300 mm disks with 4-piston calipers came installed on the 1992 and early 1993 cars. The later 1993, and all 1994 cars came with the upgraded 320 mm set taken from the 600 SL. Rear brakes on all years were 278 mm brakes from the 500 SL. In the USA, the 500 E came fully equipped, with the only options available to the buyer being a dealer-installed CD changer and an integrated cellular telephone. The 500 E only came in left hand drive, and had four leather sport seats supplied by Recaro (the front seats were generally heated).

Called the "Wolf in Sheep's Clothing" by the press, performance tests of the day yielded results that were widely considered impressive: 0–100 km/h (0–62 mph) times of 5.5 to 6.0 seconds and acceleration through the quarter-mile (0.4 km) in 14.1 seconds at 163 km/h (101 mph). The top speed was mechanically, gear-ratio limited to 250 km/h (155.3 mph) by a final drive ratio that put the engine at redline when the limited speed was reached. To increase the speed past what Mercedes limited the vehicle to, different gear sets must be installed changing the final drive ratio. It was rated at 16.8 L/100 km (14 mpg) in the city and 13.8 L/100 km (17 mpg) on the highway.

=== Engine ===
Displacement, type, valvetrain	Power	Torque	Acceleration	Top speed
4,973 cc M119 V8; 32 valve, 2×DOHC	240 kW (326 PS; 322 bhp) @ 5,700 rpm	480 N⋅m (354 lbf⋅ft) @ 3,900 rpm	0-100 km/h (62.1 mph) in 6.1 seconds	250 km/h (155.3 mph)

=== Production figures and yearly changes ===
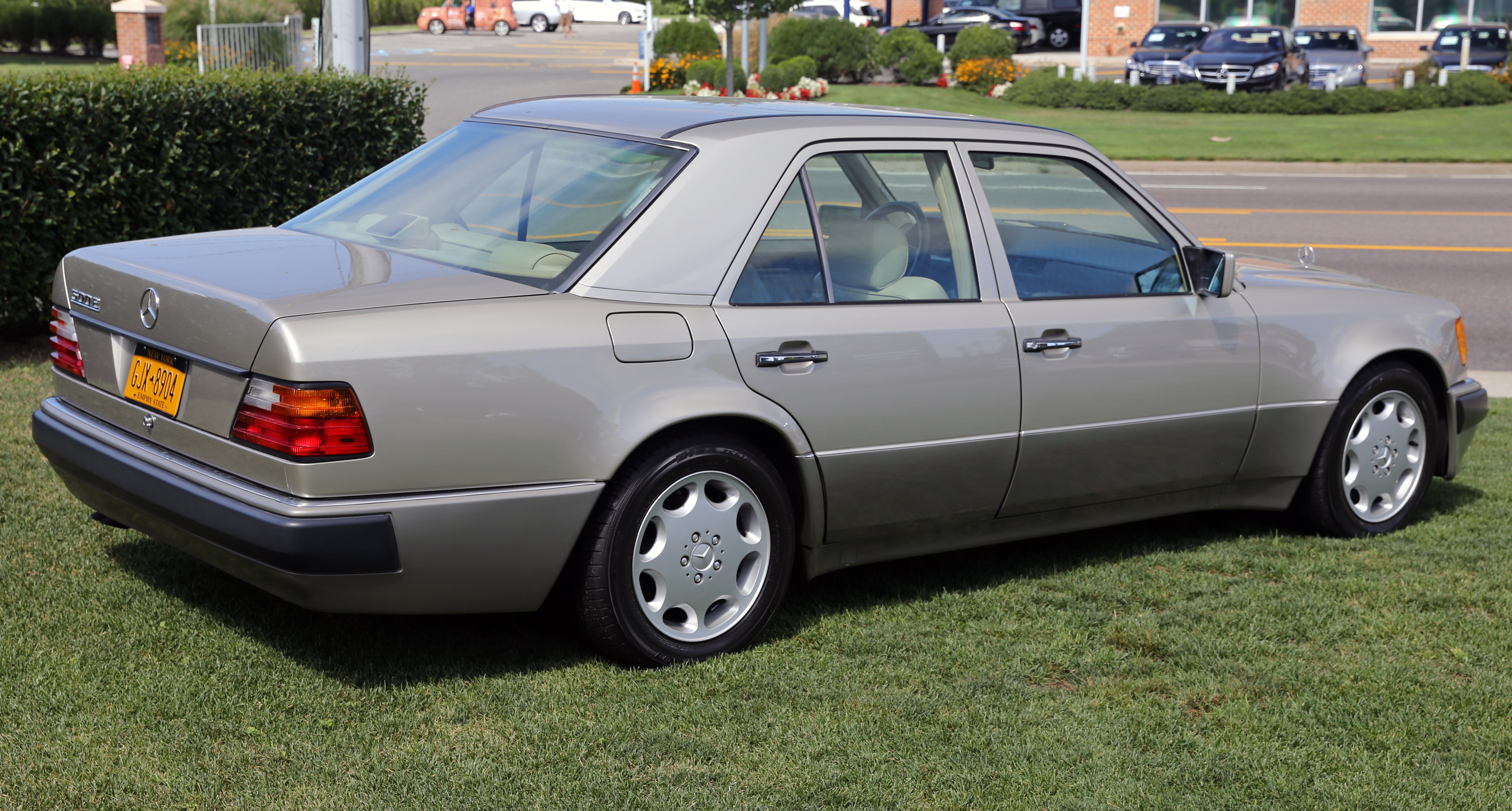
500E sedan

1528 of the "super" sports sedans were imported into the USA from late 1991 to late 1994, or roughly 500 cars per year of importation.

==== Production figures ====
Year	Units
1990	46
1991	2,566
1992	4,416
1993	1,596
1994	1,735
1995	120
total production = 10,479

==== Import numbers by key countries ====
Country	Units
USA	1,528
Japan	1,184
UK	29
Canada	85
Major country total = 2,826

I120 cars were produced between January and May 1995, as last-request cars for special customers before the series ceased production. These last cars were produced in Porsche's Rössle building alongside Audi RS2 sport wagons, as that production contract went into full swing with the same work-staff that built the 500E and E500.
The 500 E/E 500 underwent few significant changes during its three-year production run. Models from 1992 and 1993 are virtually indistinguishable from each other on the exterior, with the most notable change being a slightly less powerful (-7 HP) engine in the 1993 and 1994 model for USA. The 1994 E 500 model is more easily identified because of the cosmetic changes that affected all E-Class cars that year (updated headlights, grille, and trunk-lid; the bumper scuff bars were painted the same color as the car). The engine, however, remained unchanged from the 1993 500 E. 1994 models carried an upgraded sound system made by Becker or Alpine, replacing the two-piece Becker 1432 unit used in model year 1992 and 1993 cars. Significantly, 1994 models had larger front and rear brakes than 1992 and 1993 models, courtesy of the R129 SL600 roadster. Numerous running changes were made to the car's mechanical systems during its production life. In the early 1990s, California in the U.S. introduced many measures, including gasoline reformations to reduce emissions to control the state's air quality. All 500 E and E 500 models imported to the United States and Canada were compliant with the more stringent California emissions (a so-called "50-state car", legal for sale in all 50 states).
The 500E and E500 were known by Porsche as Type 2758 in that company's official nomenclature. As of June 2011, an example of a 1995 E500 Limited is on display in the new Porsche Museum in Zuffenhausen, Germany.

== E 60 AMG ==
There was also a specialised E 60 AMG model built in very limited numbers from 1994 to 1995 which had the 6.0L V8 engine. The vehicle made 381 bhp and can reach 0-60 mph in 5.3 seconds. The vehicle was equipped with the "Limited" sports interior, 17" EVO-II alloys together with uprated AMG sports suspension and AMG twin outlet exhaust system. Otherwise, the brakes and body remained the same. The E500 and E 60 AMG both came with the flared front and rear wheel arches with larger front bumpers and front foglights. The "957" AMG Technology Package in the data card of the vehicle almost guarantees the vehicle is an original E 60 as left the factory. A number of E500s have also been converted to E 60s by replacing the engine with a 6.0L V8, but do not carry the "957" code on their MB factory data cards. Another giveaway is the AMG engine is stamped "M 119 E 60" together with "AMG" written along the airbox, instead of "Mercedes-Benz".

- M119 6.0L V-8 Engine producing 381BHP
- EVO-II 17" alloy wheels
- Some with Sportline two-tone interior
- Birds-eye maple dark trim
- AMG Suspension
- AMG Exhaust
- E 60 AMG lettering and AMG engine stamps
- 957 "AMG Technology Package" in data card
