= Catharina Felser =

German race car driver

Catharina Felser (born 2 October 1982) is a German race car driver born in Siegburg, North Rhine-Westphalia. Catharina started her career in karting in 1997, moving up to Austrian Formula Ford in 2000. Her performances there resulted in one race in German Formula Ford, also during 2000. In 2001, she competed in German Formula BMW.

Felser continued to advance her career, stepping up to German Formula Three in 2002, driving for the van Amersfoort and KMS teams. She moved to the Trella team in 2003 before leaving the series and single-seater racing in 2004, joining the German Seat Leon Cupra Cup to drive the number 16 car.

In 2008 Catharina Felser drove a KTM X-Bow in the GT4 European Series for Team Reiter Engineering.
