= 2013 Fuji GT 300km =

Track map of the Fuji Speedway

The 2013 Fuji GT 300km was the sixth round of the 2013 Super GT season. It took place on September 8, 2013 at the Fuji Speedway in Oyama, Shizuoka, Japan.

== Background ==
NISMO drivers Ronnie Quintarelli and Masataka Yanagida led the GT500 championship standings by one point over Impul's João Paulo de Oliveira and Tsugio Matsuda, while Team Mugen led the GT300 championship over R&D Sport's Subaru BRZ.

A total of 40 cars were entered for the race, all 38 cars that raced at Suzuka were in the Fuji race with their normal 2-driver lineups, while the Tomei Sports Nissan GT-R GT3 returned to the series after missing Suzuka, as did the Dijon Racing Callaway Corvette Z06.R GT3.

== Report ==
=== Practice ===
The #1 MOLA Nissan GT-R was the fastest car in the GT500 class, while the #6 Team LeMans Lexus SC430 was 2nd fastest. In GT300 the #30 apr Nissan GT-R GT3 was fastest from two other Nissan GT-R's, the #3 NDDP Racing in 2nd and the #5 Team Mach in 3rd. The #50 Arnage Aston Martin V12 Vantage GT3 had suspension trouble during the session and only managed 23rd fastest.

=== Qualifying ===
Qualifying was held on September 7, 2013. Daiki Sasaki was the fastest driver in the first session for the GT300 cars from Yuhki Nakayama and Katsumasa Chiyo. The team ranked 4th in points, the #52 with Takeshi Tsuchiya driving only managed 16th fastest in the session. In the first session for GT500 cars Kohei Hirate was fastest from Yuhi Sekiguchi and Yuji Kunimoto. Neither the NISMO team or the Impul teams, ranked 1st and 2nd in the championship made the second session for the top 8 cars, Yanagida put in a laptime good enough for only 9th place, Oliveira was 14th fastest for Impul.

In the second GT300 qualifying session Shinichi Takagi was fastest with a 1:38.773, giving the #55 ARTA Honda CR-Z its second pole position of the season and the third for the Honda CR-Z. Kazuki Hoshino was 2nd fastest in the #3 NDDP Racing Nissan GT-R GT3, 0.425 seconds slower than Takagi's laptime. Hideki Mutoh qualified the championship leading car in 3rd place despite carrying 114 kg of weight ballast from the team's results during the season. The team that won the 500km race earlier in the season, the #31 apr Toyota Prius was 9th fastest. In the second session for GT500 cars the #38 Team ZENT Cerumo Lexus SC430 with Yuji Tachikawa driving was again fastest in Q2 and gave Tachikawa his 18th pole position in Super GT, and his 8th at Fuji Speedway. Tachikawa's lap of a 1:32.548 was 0.272 seconds faster than Andrea Caldarelli in 2nd. Kazuki Nakajima was 6th fastest in the team that won the 500 km race earlier in the year.

=== Race ===
The race was held on September 8, 2013, starting at 2:00pm local time. Kohei Hirate led the field from pole position in GT500 while in GT300 Daiki Sasaki passed Shinichi Takagi for the race lead, the polesitting car having to change its engine before the race. Takagi would drop to fourth place but contact with Björn Wirdheim caused bodywork on the CR-Z to rub on the rear wheels, forcing the team to make a pitstop. On lap 19 Ryo Michigami driving the #32 Nakajima Racing Honda HSV-010 GT had a left-rear tyre puncture while travelling down the main straight, spun and crashed into the guardrail. With debris scattered over the circuit the safety car was brought out on lap 21. During the safety car all the GT500 teams with the exception of the #24 Kondo Racing Nissan GT-R decided to make their pitstops.

The #1 MOLA GT-R managed to get Yuhi Sekiguchi into the lead in the pitstops, from the #17 HSV-010 with Koudai Tsukakoshi driving and Daisuke Ito in the #37 SC430 in 4th, however Sekiguchi was deemed to have been in violation of the restart procedure and were later given a drive-through penalty. The #4 GSR Hatsune Miku BMW started 5th in GT300 but were able to take the lead of the cars that had made their pitstop under the safety car. The #100 Team Kunimitsu HSV-010 retired following the restart due to radiator damage, while the #19 Bandoh SC430 retired from steering rod damage due to contact with a GT300 car. Juichi Wakisaka in the #39 SARD SC430 was given a drive-through penalty for a collision with Kazuki Nakajima in the #36 TOM'S SC430. On lap 43 Yuji Tachikawa managed to get the #38 back into the race lead after passing Tsukakoshi and the lead #24 GT-R with Hironobu Yasuda, who was slowing to make his pitstop. Tachikawa would hold off Tsukakoshi in the slippery conditions for the remaining 22 laps and win his 15th GT500 race. Nobuteru Taniguchi in the #4 BMW was unchallenged following the safety car, once the cars ahead pitted he was in the lead, and won by a margin of over 47 seconds over the #31 apr Toyota Prius.

== Results ==
=== Qualifying ===
Pos	No	Team	Q1 Driver	Q2 Driver	Qualifying 1	Qualifying 2	Tyre
GT500
1	38	Lexus Team Zent Cerumo	(Japan) Kohei Hirate	(Japan) Yuji Tachikawa	1:32.480	1:32.548	B
2	37	Lexus Team KeePer TOM'S	(Japan) Daisuke Ito	(Italy) Andrea Caldarelli	1:32.909	1:32.820	B
3	18	Weider Dome Racing	(France) Frédéric Makowiecki	(Japan) Naoki Yamamoto	1:32.858	1:32.824	MI
4	100	Raybrig Team Kunimitsu	(Japan) Takashi Kogure	(Japan) Takuya Izawa	1:33.137	1:32.842	B
5	36	Lexus Team Petronas TOM'S	(United Kingdom) James Rossiter	(Japan) Kazuki Nakajima	1:33.049	1:32.925	B
6	6	Lexus Team LeMans ENEOS	(Japan) Yuji Kunimoto	(Japan) Kazuya Oshima	1:32.812	1:33.047	B
7	1	S-Road REITO MOLA	(Japan) Yuhi Sekiguchi	(Japan) Satoshi Motoyama	1:32.683	1:33.062	MI
8	17	Keihin Real Racing	(Japan) Koudai Tsukakoshi	(Japan) Toshihiro Kaneishi	1:33.228	1:33.271	B
9	23	Motul Autech NISMO	(Japan) Masataka Yanagida	(Italy) Ronnie Quintarelli	1:33.330		MI
10	24	D'Station ADVAN Kondo Racing	(Japan) Hironobu Yasuda	(Germany) Michael Krumm	1:33.391		Y
11	8	Autobacs Racing Team Aguri	(Republic of Ireland) Ralph Firman	(Japan) Kosuke Matsuura	1:33.396		B
12	39	Lexus Team DENSO SARD	(Japan) Juichi Wakisaka	(Japan) Hiroaki Ishiura	1:33.434		B
13	19	Lexus Team WedsSport Bandoh	(Portugal) Andre Couto	(Japan) Seiji Ara	1:33.478		Y
14	12	Calsonic Team Impul	(Brazil) João Paulo de Oliveira	(Japan) Tsugio Matsuda	1:33.610		B
15	32	Epson Nakajima Racing	(Japan) Ryo Michigami	(Japan) Daisuke Nakajima	1:33.714		D
GT300
1	55	Autobacs Racing Team Aguri	(Japan) Takashi Kobayashi	(Japan) Shinichi Takagi	1:39.824	1:38.773	B
2	3	NDDP Racing	(Japan) Daiki Sasaki	(Japan) Kazuki Hoshino	1:39.478	1:39.198	Y
3	16	Team Mugen	(Japan) Yuhki Nakayama	(Japan) Hideki Mutoh	1:39.713	1:39.237	B
4	61	R&D Sport	(Japan) Tetsuya Yamano	(Japan) Kota Sasaki	1:40.052	1:39.403	MI
5	4	GSR Hatsune Miku	(Japan) Nobuteru Taniguchi	(Japan) Tatsuya Kataoka	1:39.861	1:39.598	Y
6	11	Gainer	(Japan) Katsuyuki Hiranaka	(Sweden) Björn Wirdheim	1:40.170	1:39.644	D
7	5	Team Mach	(Japan) Junichiro Yamashita	(Japan) Tetsuji Tamanaka	1:40.186	1:39.873	Y
8	10	Gainer	(Japan) Tetsuya Tanaka	(Japan) Masayuki Ueda	1:40.430	1:39.959	D
9	31	apr	(Japan) Morio Nitta	(Japan) Koki Saga	1:39.926	1:40.065	Y
10	30	apr	(Japan) Yuki Iwasaki	(United States) Igor Sushko	1:40.378	1:40.191	Y
11	2	Cars Tokai Dream28	(Japan) Hiroki Katoh	(Japan) Kazuho Takahashi	1:40.016	1:41.252	Y
12	48	Dijon Racing	(Japan) Katsumasa Chiyo	(Japan) Hiroshi Takamori	1:39.799	1:41.636	Y
13	9	Pacific Direction Racing	(Japan) Shogo Mitsuyama	(Japan) You Yokomaku	1:40.274	1:41.905	Y
14	86	JLOC	(Japan) Koji Yamanishi	(Japan) Shinya Hosokawa	1:40.438		Y
15	88	JLOC	(Japan) Takayuki Aoki	(Japan) Manabu Orido	1:40.522		Y
16	52	OKINAWA-IMP RACING with SHIFT	(Japan) Takeshi Tsuchiya	(Japan) Hironori Takeuchi	1:40.613		Y
17	50	Arnage Racing	(Japan) Hideto Yasuoka	(Japan) Masaki Kano	1:40.640		Y
18	62	Leon Racing	(Japan) Tsubasa Kurosawa	(Japan) Haruki Kurosawa	1:40.642		Y
19	87	JLOC	(Japan) Hideki Yamauchi	(Japan) Hiroki Yoshimoto	1:40.711		Y
20	33	Hankook KTR	(Japan) Masami Kageyama	(Japan) Tomonobu Fujii	1:40.926		HK
21	22	R'Qs MotorSports	(Japan) Masaki Jyonai	(Japan) Hisashi Wada	1:41.185		Y
22	360	Tomei Sports	(Japan) Takuya Shirasaka	(Japan) Atsushi Tanaka	1:41.241		Y
23	0	Team Taisan Ken Endless	(Japan) Naoki Yokomizo	(Japan) Kyosuke Mineo	1:41.325		Y
24	21	Hitotsuyama Racing	(United Kingdom) Richard Lyons	(Japan) Akihiro Tsuzuki	1:41.387		HK
25	96	Dijon Racing	(Japan) Masaki Tanaka	(Japan) Shin Ikegami	1:45.086		Y

=== Race ===
Race result is as follows.

Pos	No	Team	Drivers	Chassis	Tyre	Time/Difference	Laps
GT500
1	38	Lexus Team Zent Cerumo	(Japan) Kohei Hirate (Japan) Yuji Tachikawa	Lexus SC430	B	1:53:20.347	66
2	17	Keihin Real Racing	(Japan) Toshihiro Kaneishi (Japan) Koudai Tsukakoshi	Honda HSV-010 GT	B	+2.862	66
3	37	Lexus Team KeePer TOM'S	(Italy) Andrea Caldarelli (Japan) Daisuke Ito	Lexus SC430	B	+8.247	66
4	6	Lexus Team LeMans ENEOS	(Japan) Yuji Kunimoto (Japan) Kazuya Oshima	Lexus SC430	B	+21.705	66
5	18	Weider Dome Racing	(France) Frédéric Makowiecki (Japan) Naoki Yamamoto	Honda HSV-010 GT	MI	+29.431	66
6	12	Calsonic Team Impul	(Brazil) João Paulo de Oliveira (Japan) Tsugio Matsuda	Nissan GT-R	B	+37.231	66
7	1	S-Road REITO MOLA	(Japan) Satoshi Motoyama (Japan) Yuhi Sekiguchi	Nissan GT-R	MI	+44.094	66
8	8	Autobacs Racing Team Aguri	(Republic of Ireland) Ralph Firman (Japan) Kosuke Matsuura	Honda HSV-010 GT	B	+47.620	66
9	23	Motul Autech NISMO	(Italy) Ronnie Quintarelli (Japan) Masataka Yanagida	Nissan GT-R	MI	+49.414	66
10	24	D'Station ADVAN Kondo Racing	(Germany) Michael Krumm (Japan) Hironobu Yasuda	Nissan GT-R	Y	+1:09.683	66
11	39	Lexus Team DENSO SARD	(Japan) Hiroaki Ishiura (Japan) Juichi Wakisaka	Lexus SC430	B	+1 Lap	65
12	36	Lexus Team Petronas TOM'S	(Japan) Kazuki Nakajima (United Kingdom) James Rossiter	Lexus SC430	B	+1 Lap	65
Ret	19	Lexus Team WedsSport Bandoh	(Japan) Seiji Ara (Portugal) Andre Couto	Lexus SC430	Y	+30 Laps	36
Ret	100	Raybrig Team Kunimitsu	(Japan) Takuya Izawa (Japan) Takashi Kogure	Honda HSV-010 GT	B	+40 Laps	26
Ret	32	Epson Nakajima Racing	(Japan) Ryo Michigami (Japan) Daisuke Nakajima	Honda HSV-010 GT	D	+46 Laps	18
GT300
1	4	GSR Hatsune Miku	(Japan) Tatsuya Kataoka (Japan) Nobuteru Taniguchi	BMW Z4 GT3	Y	1:54:00.235	62
2	31	apr	(Japan) Morio Nitta (Japan) Koki Saga	Toyota Prius	Y	+47.884	62
3	86	JLOC	(Japan) Shinya Hosokawa (Japan) Koji Yamanishi	Lamborghini Gallardo GT3	Y	+53.267	62
4	62	Leon Racing	(Japan) Haruki Kurosawa (Japan) Tsubasa Kurosawa	Mercedes-Benz SLS AMG GT3	Y	+54.931	62
5	3	NDDP Racing	(Japan) Kazuki Hoshino (Japan) Daiki Sasaki	Nissan GT-R GT3	Y	+1 Lap	61
10	10	Gainer	(Japan) Tetsuya Tanaka (Japan) Masayuki Ueda	Mercedes-Benz SLS AMG GT3	D	+1 Lap	61
13	11	Gainer	(Japan) Katsuyuki Hiranaka (Sweden) Björn Wirdheim	Mercedes-Benz SLS AMG GT3	D	+1 Lap	61
8	16	Team Mugen	(Japan) Hideki Mutoh (Japan) Yuhki Nakayama	Honda CR-Z	B	+1 Lap	61
9	61	R&D Sport	(Japan) Kota Sasaki (Japan) Tetsuya Yamano	Subaru BRZ	MI	+1 Lap	61
10	52	OKINAWA-IMP RACING with SHIFT	(Japan) Hironori Takeuchi (Japan) Takeshi Tsuchiya	Mercedes-Benz SLS AMG GT3	Y	+1 Lap	61
11	5	Team Mach	(Japan) Tetsuji Tamanaka (Japan) Junichiro Yamashita	Nissan GT-R GT3	Y	+1 Lap	61
12	30	apr	(Japan) Yuki Iwasaki (United States) Igor Sushko	Nissan GT-R GT3	Y	+1 Lap	61
13	21	Hitotsuyama Racing	(United Kingdom) Richard Lyons (Japan) Akihiro Tsuzuki	Audi R8 LMS ultra	HK	+1 Lap	61
14	2	Cars Tokai Dream28	(Japan) Hiroki Katoh (Japan) Kazuho Takahashi	McLaren MP4-12C GT3	Y	+1 Lap	61
15	33	Hankook KTR	(Japan) Tomonobu Fujii (Japan) Masami Kageyama	Porsche 911 GT3-R	HK	+1 Lap	61
16	55	Autobacs Racing Team Aguri	(Japan) Takashi Kobayashi (Japan) Shinichi Takagi	Honda CR-Z	B	+1 Lap	61
17	22	R'Qs MotorSports	(Japan) Masaki Jyonai (Japan) Hisashi Wada	Mercedes-Benz SLS AMG GT3	Y	+1 Lap	61
18	50	Arnage Racing	(Japan) Masaki Kano (Japan) Hideto Yasuoka	Aston Martin V12 Vantage GT3	Y	+2 Laps	60
19	0	Team Taisan Ken Endless	(Japan) Kyosuke Mineo (Japan) Naoki Yokomizo	Porsche 997 GT3	Y	+2 Laps	60
20	87	JLOC	(Japan) Hideki Yamauchi (Japan) Hiroki Yoshimoto	Lamborghini Gallardo GT3	Y	+2 Laps	60
21	9	Pacific Direction Racing	(Japan) Shogo Mitsuyama (Japan) You Yokomaku	Porsche 911 GT3-R	Y	+3 Laps	59
22	96	Dijon Racing	(Japan) Shin Ikegami (Japan) Masaki Tanaka	Callaway Corvette Z06.R GT3	Y	+4 Laps	58
23	360	Tomei Sports	(Japan) Takuya Shirasaka (Japan) Atsushi Tanaka	Nissan GT-R GT3	Y	+9 Laps	53
Ret	48	Dijon Racing	(Japan) Katsumasa Chiyo (Japan) Hiroshi Takamori	Nissan GT-R GT3	Y	+22 Lap	40
Ret	88	JLOC	(Japan) Takayuki Aoki (Japan) Manabu Orido	Lamborghini Gallardo GT3	Y	+29 Laps	33

- GT500 Fastest Lap – Kohei Hirate, #38 Lexus Team Zent Cerumo Lexus SC430 – 1:34.633
- GT300 Fastest Lap – Nobuteru Taniguchi, #4 GSR Hatsune Miku BMW Z4 GT3 – 1:41.666

== Point rankings after the event ==
GT500 Driver Point rankings

Rank	Driver	Points
1	(France) Frédéric Makowiecki (Japan) Naoki Yamamoto	46
2	(Brazil) João Paulo de Oliveira (Japan) Tsugio Matsuda	46
3	(Italy) Ronnie Quintarelli (Japan) Masataka Yanagida	44
4	(Japan) Kohei Hirate (Japan) Yuji Tachikawa	43
5	(Japan) Toshihiro Kaneishi (Japan) Koudai Tsukakoshi	41

GT300 Driver Point rankings

Rank	Driver	Points
1	(Japan) Hideki Mutoh (Japan) Yuhki Nakayama	60
2	(Japan) Katsuyuki Hiranaka (Sweden) Björn Wirdheim	46
3	(Japan) Kota Sasaki (Japan) Tetsuya Yamano	46
4	(Japan) Hironori Takeuchi (Japan) Takeshi Tsuchiya	43
5	(Japan) Tatsuya Kataoka (Japan) Nobuteru Taniguchi	42

- Note: Only the top five positions are included for both GT500 and GT300 classes.

Super GT
Previous race: Suzuka 1000km	2013 season	Next race: 3 Hours of Fuji (GT300 cars only); Autopolis GT 300km (Super GT Round 7)
