= 2000 German Formula Three Championship =

Seasons
- ← 1999 2001 →

The 2000 German Formula Three Championship (German: 2000 Deutsche Formel-3-Meisterschaft) was a multi-event motor racing championship for single-seat open wheel formula racing cars that held across Europe. The championship featured drivers competing in two-litre Formula Three racing cars built by Dallara and Martini which conform to the technical regulations, or formula, for the championship. It commenced on 22 April at Zolder and ended at Hockenheim on 29 October after ten double-header rounds.

Opel Team KMS driver Giorgio Pantano became a champion. He grabbed the title, winning opening race at Zolder and Oschersleben. Alex Müller finished as runner-up with wins at Zolder, Sachsenring, Lausitz and Hockenheim, losing 14 points to Pantano. Pierre Kaffer was victorious at Norisring, Lausitz, Nürburgring and finished third. André Lotterer became a champion in the Rookie's standings with a fourth place in the main championship. The other race winners was Stefan Mücke, Patrick Friesacher, Enrico Toccacelo and Toshihiro Kaneishi, who completed the top eight in the drivers' championship.

The scoring system consisted of 20-15-12-10-8-6-4-3-2-1 points awarded to the top ten finishers in the race, with three extra points for the driver who took pole position.

== Teams and drivers ==
2000 Entry list
Team	No.	Driver	Chassis	Engine	Status	Rounds
(Germany) Opel Team BSR	1	(Austria) Patrick Friesacher	Dallara F300/028	Opel		All
(Germany) Opel Team BSR	2	(Germany) André Lotterer	Dallara F399/021	Opel	R	All
(Germany) Opel Team BSR	3	(Germany) Sven Heidfeld	Dallara F399/023	Opel		1–8
(Germany) Opel Team BSR	3	(Austria) Bernhard Auinger	Dallara F399/023	Opel		9–10
(Switzerland) Opel Team KMS	4	(Italy) Giorgio Pantano	Dallara F300/011	Opel		All
(Switzerland) Opel Team KMS	5	(Germany) Martin Tomczyk	Dallara F300/010	Opel	R	All
(Germany) GM Motorsport	6	(Germany) Tony Schmidt	Dallara F399/073	Opel		All
(Germany) GM Motorsport	7	(Hungary) Zsolt Baumgartner	Dallara F399/042	Opel	R	All
(Germany) GM Motorsport	8	(Japan) Toshihiro Kaneishi	Dallara F300/019	Opel		1–4, 6–10
(Belgium) JB Motorsport	9	(Belgium) Val Hillebrand	Dallara F399/041	Opel	R	1–4, 6–7, 9–10
(Belgium) JB Motorsport	10	(Belgium) Nicolas Stelandre	Dallara F399/003	Opel		1–4, 6–7, 9–10
(Netherlands) Van Amersfoort Racing	11	(Netherlands) Jeroen Bleekemolen	Dallara F300/050	Opel		1–4, 6–10
(Netherlands) Van Amersfoort Racing	12	(Belgium) Tom van Bavel	Dallara F399/058	Opel	R	All
(Germany) Team Rosberg	14	(Finland) Kari Mäenpää	Dallara F399/074	Renault		All
(Germany) Team Rosberg	15	(Finland) Hannu Viinikainen	Dallara F399/065	Renault	R	All
(Germany) ADAC Berlin-Brandenburg	16	(Germany) Stefan Mücke	Dallara F300/001	Opel		All
(Germany) Josef Kaufmann Racing	17	(Germany) Thomas Mutsch	Martini MK79/07	Opel		All
(Germany) Josef Kaufmann Racing	18	(Germany) Andreas Feichtner	Martini MK79/01	Opel		1–2
(Germany) Klaus Trella Motorsport	19	(Germany) Frank Diefenbacher	Dallara F300/012	Opel	R	All
(Germany) Klaus Trella Motorsport	20	(Italy) Marc Caldonazzi	Dallara F399/009	Opel	R	All
(Germany) team hms f3	21	(Germany) Pierre Kaffer	Dallara F300/022	Opel		All
(Germany) team hms f3	22	(Germany) Andreas Gülden	Dallara F300/023	Opel		1–2
(Switzerland) Swiss Racing Team	23	(Switzerland) Giorgio Mecattaf	Dallara F399/068	Opel	R	1–4, 6–10
(Switzerland) Swiss Racing Team	24	(Italy) Armin Pörnbacher	Dallara F399/054	Opel	R	1–4, 6–10
(Germany) Patrick Hildenbrandt	25	(Germany) Patrick Hildenbrandt	Martini MK79/05	Opel		All
(Germany) AIL Team Kolles Racing	26	(United Kingdom) Marc Hynes	Dallara F300/026	Mugen-Honda		1
(Germany) AIL Team Kolles Racing	26	(Sweden) Peter Sundberg	Dallara F300/026	Mugen-Honda		2–4, 6
(Germany) AIL Team Kolles Racing	26	(Germany) Andreas Feichtner	Dallara F300/026	Mugen-Honda		7–10
(Germany) AIL Team Kolles Racing	27	(Netherlands) Elran Nijenhuis	Dallara F300/013	Mugen-Honda		1–4, 6–7, 10
(Germany) AIL Team Kolles Racing	27	(Sweden) Peter Sundberg	Dallara F300/013	Mugen-Honda		8–9
(Italy) Team Ghinzani	28	(Germany) Alex Müller	Dallara F300/025	Mugen-Honda		All
(Italy) Team Ghinzani	99	(Sweden) Björn Wirdheim	Dallara F300/029	Mugen-Honda	R	All
(Italy) Prema Powerteam	30	(Italy) Enrico Toccacelo	Dallara F300/018	Opel		All
(Italy) Prema Powerteam	31	(Belgium) Philip Cloostermans	Dallara F300/021	Opel	R	1–4, 6–10
(Italy) Team VOX / TV Spielfilm	32	(Republic of Ireland) Ken Grandon	Dallara F300/034	Fiat		2–8
(Italy) Team VOX / TV Spielfilm	32	(Italy) Roberto Toninelli	Dallara F300/034	Fiat		9–10
(Italy) Team VOX / TV Spielfilm	33	(Italy) Marino Spinozzi	Dallara F300/033	Fiat	R	2–10
(Switzerland) Jo Zeller Racing	34	(Switzerland) Mirco Schrepfer	Dallara F399/020	Opel		9–10

Icon	Class
R	Rookie

== Calendar ==
With the exception of round at Zolder in Belgium, all rounds took place on German soil.

Round		Location	Circuit	Date	Supporting
1	R1	Heusden-Zolder, Belgium	Circuit Zolder	16 April	New Race Festival
1	R2	Heusden-Zolder, Belgium	Circuit Zolder	16 April	New Race Festival
2	R1	Hockenheim, Germany	Hockenheimring	27 May	AvD/MAC-Rennsportfestival
2	R2	Hockenheim, Germany	Hockenheimring	28 May	AvD/MAC-Rennsportfestival
3	R1	Oschersleben, Germany	Motorsport Arena Oschersleben	17 June	ADAC-Preis der Tourenwagen von "Sachsen-Anhalt"
3	R2	Oschersleben, Germany	Motorsport Arena Oschersleben	18 June	ADAC-Preis der Tourenwagen von "Sachsen-Anhalt"
4	R1	Nuremberg, Germany	Norisring	8 July	ADAC Norisring Speedweekend
4	R2	Nuremberg, Germany	Norisring	9 July	ADAC Norisring Speedweekend
5	R1	Saxony, Germany	Sachsenring	5 August	ADAC Sparkassenpreis Sachsenring
5	R2	Saxony, Germany	Sachsenring	6 August	ADAC Sparkassenpreis Sachsenring
6	R1	Nürburg, Germany	Nürburgring	19 August	ADAC Großer Preis der Tourenwagen
6	R2	Nürburg, Germany	Nürburgring	20 August	ADAC Großer Preis der Tourenwagen
7	R1	Klettwitz, Germany	EuroSpeedway Lausitz	2 September	ADAC-Rundstreckenrennen Lausitz 200
7	R2	Klettwitz, Germany	EuroSpeedway Lausitz	3 September	ADAC-Rundstreckenrennen Lausitz 200
8	R1	Oschersleben, Germany	Motorsport Arena Oschersleben	23 September	ADAC-Preis von Niedersachsen
8	R2	Oschersleben, Germany	Motorsport Arena Oschersleben	24 September	ADAC-Preis von Niedersachsen
9	R1	Nürburg, Germany	Nürburgring	7 October	62. ADAC-Eifelrennen
9	R2	Nürburg, Germany	Nürburgring	8 October	62. ADAC-Eifelrennen
10	R1	Hockenheim, Germany	Hockenheimring	28 October	ADAC-Preis Hockenheim
10	R2	Hockenheim, Germany	Hockenheimring	29 October	ADAC-Preis Hockenheim

== Results ==
Round		Circuit	Pole position	Fastest lap	Winning driver	Winning team
1	R1	Circuit Zolder	(Netherlands) Jeroen Bleekemolen	(Germany) Pierre Kaffer	(Italy) Giorgio Pantano	(Switzerland) Opel Team KMS
1	R2	Circuit Zolder	(Germany) Alex Müller	(Italy) Giorgio Pantano	(Germany) Alex Müller	(Italy) Team Ghinzani
2	R1	Hockenheimring	(Germany) Frank Diefenbacher	(Germany) André Lotterer	(Germany) André Lotterer	(Germany) Opel Team BSR
2	R2	Hockenheimring	(Italy) Giorgio Pantano	(Italy) Giorgio Pantano	(Germany) André Lotterer	(Germany) Opel Team BSR
3	R1	Motorsport Arena Oschersleben	(Germany) André Lotterer	(Germany) Frank Diefenbacher	(Germany) André Lotterer	(Germany) Opel Team BSR
3	R2	Motorsport Arena Oschersleben	(Austria) Patrick Friesacher	(Italy) Giorgio Pantano	(Italy) Giorgio Pantano	(Switzerland) Opel Team KMS
4	R1	Norisring	(Germany) Sven Heidfeld	(Germany) Pierre Kaffer	(Germany) Pierre Kaffer	(Germany) team hms f3
4	R2	Norisring	(Germany) Stefan Mücke	(Germany) André Lotterer	(Germany) Pierre Kaffer	(Germany) team hms f3
5	R1	Sachsenring	(Austria) Patrick Friesacher	(Germany) Alex Müller	(Austria) Patrick Friesacher	(Germany) Opel Team BSR
5	R2	Sachsenring	(Austria) Patrick Friesacher	(Germany) Alex Müller	(Germany) Alex Müller	(Italy) Team Ghinzani
6	R1	Nürburgring	(Germany) Stefan Mücke	(Italy) Giorgio Pantano	(Germany) Stefan Mücke	(Germany) ADAC Berlin-Brandenburg
6	R2	Nürburgring	(Germany) Alex Müller	(Austria) Patrick Friesacher	(Japan) Toshihiro Kaneishi	(Germany) GM Motorsport
7	R1	EuroSpeedway Lausitz	(Italy) Enrico Toccacelo	(Germany) Pierre Kaffer	(Germany) Pierre Kaffer	(Germany) team hms f3
7	R2	EuroSpeedway Lausitz	(Italy) Enrico Toccacelo	(Germany) Frank Diefenbacher	(Germany) Alex Müller	(Italy) Team Ghinzani
8	R1	Motorsport Arena Oschersleben	(Italy) Giorgio Pantano	(Italy) Giorgio Pantano	(Italy) Giorgio Pantano	(Switzerland) Opel Team KMS
8	R2	Motorsport Arena Oschersleben	(Italy) Giorgio Pantano	(Germany) Pierre Kaffer	(Austria) Patrick Friesacher	(Germany) Opel Team BSR
9	R1	Nürburgring	(Germany) Pierre Kaffer	(Germany) Pierre Kaffer	(Germany) Pierre Kaffer	(Germany) team hms f3
9	R2	Nürburgring	(Italy) Enrico Toccacelo	(Japan) Toshihiro Kaneishi	(Italy) Enrico Toccacelo	(Italy) Prema Powerteam
10	R1	Hockenheimring	(Germany) Stefan Mücke	(Germany) Stefan Mücke	(Germany) Stefan Mücke	(Germany) ADAC Berlin-Brandenburg
10	R2	Hockenheimring	(Germany) Frank Diefenbacher	(Austria) Patrick Friesacher	(Germany) Alex Müller	(Italy) Team Ghinzani

== Championship standings ==
=== Championship ===
Pos	Driver	ZOL		HOC1		OSC1		NOR		SAC		NÜR1		LAU		OSC2		NÜR2		HOC2		Points
1	(Italy) Giorgio Pantano	1	2	10	2	4	1	2	Ret	7	2	Ret	10	3	5	1	2	8	11	4	3	205
2	(Germany) Alex Müller	6	1	5	7	5	13	5	9	2	1	4	Ret	8	1	5	6	9	26	2	1	181
3	(Germany) Pierre Kaffer	11	8	2	10	17	3	1	1	5	4	11	7	1	Ret	3	3	1	22	7	Ret	164
4	(Germany) André Lotterer	3	Ret	1	1	1	4	14	13	6	7	5	2	12	2	6	Ret	3	25	Ret	Ret	151
5	(Germany) Stefan Mücke	2	7	Ret	19	6	7	3	Ret	4	8	1	Ret	7	9	2	5	7	Ret	1	20	136
6	(Austria) Patrick Friesacher	8	Ret	3	11	8	18	DNQ	Ret	1	10	8	5	5	13	4	1	5	DNS	6	2	126
7	(Italy) Enrico Toccacelo	14	DNS	7	Ret	21	2	8	DNQ	3	9	2	4	2	3	25	9	6	1	28	13	125
8	(Japan) Toshihiro Kaneishi	18	9	6	6	19	12	7	6			Ret	1	14	16	9	8	4	2	5	19	82
9	(Germany) Sven Heidfeld	Ret	22	11	16	Ret	16	4	2	14	3	20	16	4	4	15	7					64
10	(Germany) Frank Diefenbacher	10	17	16	Ret	2	5	19	DNQ	8	DSQ	14	Ret	9	6	14	10	2	12	13	Ret	57
11	(Belgium) Tom van Bavel	5	14	20	5	Ret	Ret	11	11			3	3	19	8	7	Ret	18	7	10	12	52
12	(Germany) Martin Tomczyk	23	12	9	Ret	11	15	DNQ	DNQ	Ret	5	13	8	6	12	8	4	10	6	12	4	49
13	(Hungary) Zsolt Baumgartner	7	5	4	Ret	22	8	9	4			7	14	18	19	12	Ret	Ret	Ret	15	11	41
14	(Sweden) Björn Wirdheim	16	4	13	4	Ret	DNS	13	DSQ	Ret	6	Ret	6	10	15	19	Ret	9	14	8	Ret	38
15	(Germany) Tony Schmidt	15	10	12	Ret	Ret	20	6	Ret			6	Ret	16	24	11	14	21	4	3	9	37
16	(Netherlands) Jeroen Bleekemolen	4	Ret	18	8	DNS	DNS	12	5			15	12	Ret	7	18	Ret	17	24	18	5	36
17	(Belgium) Nicolas Stelandre	9	DNS	Ret	3	3	10	Ret	10			Ret	Ret	16	24			15	Ret	22	10	29
18	(Netherlands) Elran Nijenhuis	19	3	Ret	Ret	DNS	Ret	DNQ	Ret			Ret	11	15	27					14	6	18
19	(Italy) Armin Pörnbacher	12	15	21	15	18	6	Ret	DNS			9	15	13	20	28	Ret	12	5	19	15	16
20	(Belgium) Val Hillebrand	Ret	18	15	Ret	16	22	Ret	8			21	23	26	26			Ret	3	11	Ret	15
21	(Finland) Kari Mäenpää	17	6	8	9	7	11	17	Ret	Ret	Ret	17	18	17	14	13	12	20	Ret	17	14	15
22	(Germany) Thomas Mutsch	13	11	Ret	17	9	17	10	7	9	DSQ	Ret	Ret	27	11	16	15	13	14	16	Ret	9
23	(Belgium) Philip Cloostermans	DNS	13	DNQ	Ret	14	9	DNQ	Ret			12	9	11	10	24	16	16	13	9	16	7
24	(Germany) Andreas Feichtner	22	19	Ret	14									Ret	22	21	18	28	17	23	7	4
25	(Sweden) Peter Sundberg			DSQ	12	13	14	Ret	Ret			DNS	DNS			10	Ret	26	8			4
26	(Italy) Marc Caldonazzi	21	20	19	DNQ	15	Ret	16	12	11	13	16	17	25	25	26	Ret	19	16	20	8	3
27	(Switzerland) Giorgio Mecattaf	20	Ret	17	Ret	12	19	Ret	DNQ			10	13	Ret	18	17	13	11	10	29	Ret	2
28	(Republic of Ireland) Ken Grandon			DNQ	DNQ	Ret	21	18	15	10	12	Ret	20	22	Ret	20	Ret					1
29	(Finland) Hannu Viinikainen	Ret	16	14	13	10	23	15	14	12	Ret	18	19	20	23	27	Ret	24	18	Ret	Ret	1
30	(Italy) Marino Spinozzi			DNQ	18	23	Ret	DNQ	DNQ	Ret	11	Ret	21	23	Ret	23	19	22	15	26	18	0
31	(Germany) Patrick Hildenbrandt	24	21	DNQ	DNQ	20	24	DNQ	DNQ	13	14	19	22	21	21	22	17	27	19	25	17	0
32	(Austria) Bernhard Auinger																	Ret	20	27	Ret	0
33	(Switzerland) Mirco Schrepfer																	25	21	21	Ret	0
34	(Italy) Roberto Toninelli																	23	23	24	Ret	0
	(Germany) Andreas Gülden	Ret	Ret	Ret	DNQ																	0
	(United Kingdom) Marc Hynes	DNS	DNS																			0
Pos	Driver	ZOL		HOC1		OSC1		NOR		SAC		NÜR1		LAU		OSC2		NÜR2		HOC2		Points

=== Junior-Pokal (Rookie) standings ===
	Driver	Points
1	(Germany) André Lotterer	231
2	(Germany) Frank Diefenbacher	138
3	(Belgium) Tom van Bavel	135
4	(Germany) Martin Tomczyk	116
5	(Sweden) Björn Wirdheim	98
6	(Hungary) Zsolt Baumgartner	92
7	(Belgium) Val Hillebrand	64
8	(Belgium) Philip Cloostermans	57
9	(Italy) Armin Pörnbacher	37
10	(Switzerland) Giorgio Mecattaf	21
11	(Italy) Marc Caldonazzi	20
12	(Finland) Hannu Viinikainen	18
13	(Italy) Marino Spinozzi	9
