= 2001 German Formula Three Championship =

Seasons
- ← 2000 2002 →

The 2001 German Formula Three Championship (German: 2001 Deutsche Formel-3-Meisterschaft) was a multi-event motor racing championship for single-seat open wheel formula racing cars that held across Europe. The championship featured drivers competing in two-litre Formula Three racing cars built by Dallara which conform to the technical regulations, or formula, for the championship. It commenced on 21 April at Hockenheim and ended at the same place on 6 October after ten double-header rounds.

Opel Team BSR driver Toshihiro Kaneishi became the first and only Japanese champion and the first champion from Asia. He clinched the title, winning races at Norisring and A1-Ring. Stefan Mücke finished as runner-up with wins at Nürburgring and Hockenheim, losing just four points to Kaneishi. Frank Diefenbacher and Pierre Kaffer both won four races to end the season third and fourth in the drivers' standings. Markus Winkelhock won Rookie title and three races. The other race winners was Gary Paffett, João Paulo de Oliveira, Kosuke Matsuura and Björn Wirdheim.

The scoring system consisted of 20-15-12-10-8-6-4-3-2-1 points awarded to the top ten finishers in the race, with 1 (one) extra point for the driver who took pole position.

== Teams and drivers ==
All drivers competed in Dallara chassis and used Yokohama tyres; model listed.

| Team | No. | Driver | Chassis | Engine | Status | Rounds |
|---|---|---|---|---|---|---|
| (Switzerland) Opel Team KMS | 1 | (Austria) Robert Lechner | F301/016 | Opel | | 1–3 |
| (Switzerland) Opel Team KMS | 1 | (Italy) Ronnie Quintarelli | F301/016 | Opel | R | 5–8 |
| (Switzerland) Opel Team KMS | 1 | (Brazil) Wagner Ebrahim | F301/016 | Opel | | 9 |
| (Switzerland) Opel Team KMS | 2 | (Italy) Giuseppe Burlotti | F301/010 | Opel | R | 1–3 |
| (Switzerland) Opel Team KMS | 2 | (Italy) Ronnie Quintarelli | F301/010 | Opel | R | 4 |
| (Switzerland) Opel Team KMS | 2 | (Czech Republic) Jaroslav Janiš | F301/010 | Opel | R | 5–10 |
| (Germany) ADAC Berlin-Brandenburg | 5 | (Germany) Markus Winkelhock | F301/001 | Opel | R | All |
| (Germany) ADAC Berlin-Brandenburg | 6 | (Germany) Stefan Mücke | F301/006 | Opel | | All |
| (Germany) Opel Team BSR | 7 | (Austria) Bernhard Auinger | F399/023 | Opel | | All |
| (Germany) Opel Team BSR | 8 | (Japan) Toshihiro Kaneishi | F300/028 | Opel | | All |
| (Germany) Opel Team BSR | 9 | (Germany) Frank Diefenbacher | F301/010 | Opel | | All |
| (Italy) Prema Powerteam | 10 | (Japan) Kosuke Matsuura | F301/009 | Opel | R | All |
| (Italy) Prema Powerteam | 11 | (Sweden) Björn Wirdheim | F301/024 | Opel | | All |
| (Italy) Prema Powerteam | 16 | (Australia) Ryan Briscoe | F399/037 | Opel | | 7 |
| (Germany) GM Motorsport | 12 | (United States) Phil Giebler | F301/007 | Toyota | | 1–3 |
| (Germany) GM Motorsport | 12 | (Denmark) Nicolas Kiesa | F301/007 | Toyota | | 5–10 |
| (Germany) GM Motorsport | 14 | (Germany) Tony Schmidt | F301/026 | Toyota | | All |
| (Germany) GM Motorsport | 15 | (Austria) Hannes Lachinger | F301/031 | Toyota | R | All |
| (Germany) MOL — Trella Motorsport | 17 | (Hungary) Zsolt Baumgartner | F300/012 | Opel | | 1–9 |
| (Netherlands) Van Amersfoort Racing | 18 | (Italy) Marc Caldonazzi | F300/050 | Opel | | 1–5 |
| (Netherlands) Van Amersfoort Racing | 18 | (Germany) André Fibier | F300/050 | Opel | | 6 |
| (Netherlands) Van Amersfoort Racing | 18 | (Denmark) Allan Simonsen | F300/050 | Opel | R | 7–10 |
| (Netherlands) Van Amersfoort Racing | 19 | (Netherlands) Marco du Pau | F399/058 | Opel | | 1–6 |
| (Belgium) JB Motorsport | 20 | (Belgium) Nicolas Stelandre | F399/003 | Opel | | 1–6 |
| (Belgium) JB Motorsport | 20 | (Netherlands) Robert Doornbos | F399/003 | Opel | | 8–10 |
| (Belgium) JB Motorsport | 21 | (Belgium) Tom van Bavel | F399/041 | Opel | | All |
| (Germany) Team Kolles Racing | 22 | (Finland) Kimmo Liimatainen | F300/026 | Mugen-Honda | R | All |
| (Germany) Team Kolles Racing | 23 | (Germany) Pierre Kaffer | F300/013 | Mugen-Honda | | All |
| (Switzerland) Swiss Racing Team | 24 | (United Kingdom) Andrew Kirkaldy | F399/054 | Opel | | 1 |
| (Switzerland) Swiss Racing Team | 24 | (Finland) Kari Maenpaa | F399/054 | Opel | | 2–9 |
| (Switzerland) Swiss Racing Team | 24 | (Switzerland) Gilles Tinguely | F399/054 | Opel | | 10 |
| (Switzerland) Swiss Racing Team | 25 | (Brazil) João Paulo de Oliveira | F399/068 | Opel | | All |
| (Germany) Team Rosberg | 26 | (United Kingdom) Gary Paffett | F301/014 | Opel | | All |
| (Germany) Team Rosberg | 27 | (France) Laurent Delahaye | F301/015 | Renault | | All |
| (Germany) Josef Kaufmann Racing | 28 | (Germany) Thomas Riethmüller | F300/041 | Opel | R | 1–8, 10 |
| (Italy) Cram Competition | 31 | (Italy) Matteo Grassotto | F301/032 | Opel | | 1–7 |
| (Italy) Cram Competition | 31 | (United Kingdom) Mark Mayall | F301/032 | Opel | | 9 |
| (Italy) Cram Competition | 32 | (Italy) Raffaele Giammaria | F301/003 | Opel | | All |
| (Austria) Palfinger F3 Racing Team | 33 | (Austria) Norbert Siedler | F300/011 | Opel | | All |
| (Austria) Petutschnig Engineering | 34 | (Germany) Sven Heidfeld | F399/009 | Opel | | 1–2 |
| (Austria) Petutschnig Engineering | 35 | (Austria) Clemens Stadler | F300/019 | Opel | | 1 |
| (Austria) CCT Racing | 36 | (Austria) Marco Schärf | F300/023 | Opel | | All |
| (Austria) Franz Wöss Racing | 37 | (Austria) Clemens Stadler | F399/021 | Opel | | 9 |
| (Italy) Team Ghinzani | 98 | (Austria) Gottfried Grasser | F300/029 | Mugen-Honda | R | All |
| (Italy) Team Ghinzani | 99 | (Italy) Fabrizio del Monte | F300/025 | Mugen-Honda | R | All |

| Icon | Class |
|---|---|
| R | Rookie |

== Calendar ==
With the exception of round at A1-Ring in Austria, all rounds took place on German soil.

| Round | | Location | Circuit | Date | Supporting |
|---|---|---|---|---|---|
| 1 | R1 | Hockenheim, Germany | Hockenheimring | 21 April | AvD/MAC-Rennsportfestival |
| 1 | R2 | Hockenheim, Germany | Hockenheimring | 22 April | AvD/MAC-Rennsportfestival |
| 2 | R1 | Nürburg, Germany | Nürburgring | 5 May | 63. ADAC Eifelrennen |
| 2 | R2 | Nürburg, Germany | Nürburgring | 6 May | 63. ADAC Eifelrennen |
| 3 | R1 | Oschersleben, Germany | Motorsport Arena Oschersleben | 19 May | ADAC-Preis der Tourenwagen von "Sachsen-Anhalt" |
| 3 | R2 | Oschersleben, Germany | Motorsport Arena Oschersleben | 20 May | ADAC-Preis der Tourenwagen von "Sachsen-Anhalt" |
| 4 | R1 | Saxony, Germany | Sachsenring | 16 June | ADAC-Rundstreckenrennen Sachsenring |
| 4 | R2 | Saxony, Germany | Sachsenring | 17 June | ADAC-Rundstreckenrennen Sachsenring |
| 5 | R1 | Nuremberg, Germany | Norisring | 7 July | 59. Norisring Speedweekend |
| 5 | R2 | Nuremberg, Germany | Norisring | 8 July | 59. Norisring Speedweekend |
| 6 | R1 | Hockenheim, Germany | Hockenheimring | 28 July | German Grand Prix |
| 6 | R2 | Hockenheim, Germany | Hockenheimring | 29 July | German Grand Prix |
| 7 | R1 | Klettwitz, Germany | EuroSpeedway Lausitz | 11 August | ADAC-Rundstreckenrennen Lausitz 200 |
| 7 | R2 | Klettwitz, Germany | EuroSpeedway Lausitz | 12 August | ADAC-Rundstreckenrennen Lausitz 200 |
| 8 | R1 | Nürburg, Germany | Nürburgring | 25 August | ADAC Großer Preis der Tourenwagen |
| 8 | R2 | Nürburg, Germany | Nürburgring | 26 August | ADAC Großer Preis der Tourenwagen |
| 9 | R1 | Spielberg, Austria | A1-Ring | 8 September | ADAC Rundstreckenrennen A1-Ring |
| 9 | R2 | Spielberg, Austria | A1-Ring | 9 September | ADAC Rundstreckenrennen A1-Ring |
| 10 | R1 | Hockenheim, Germany | Hockenheimring | 6 October | DMV-Preis Hockenheim |
| 10 | R2 | Hockenheim, Germany | Hockenheimring | 7 October | DMV-Preis Hockenheim |

== Results ==
| Round | | Circuit | Pole position | Fastest lap | Winning driver | Winning team |
|---|---|---|---|---|---|---|
| 1 | R1 | Hockenheimring | (Germany) Frank Diefenbacher | (Germany) Frank Diefenbacher | (Germany) Frank Diefenbacher | (Germany) Opel Team BSR |
| 1 | R2 | Hockenheimring | (Germany) Frank Diefenbacher | (Germany) Frank Diefenbacher | (Germany) Frank Diefenbacher | (Germany) Opel Team BSR |
| 2 | R1 | Nürburgring | (Germany) Pierre Kaffer | (Germany) Pierre Kaffer | (Germany) Pierre Kaffer | (Germany) Team Kolles Racing |
| 2 | R2 | Nürburgring | (Germany) Frank Diefenbacher | (Germany) Stefan Mücke | (Germany) Stefan Mücke | (Germany) ADAC Berlin-Brandenburg |
| 3 | R1 | Motorsport Arena Oschersleben | (Germany) Markus Winkelhock | (United Kingdom) Gary Paffett | (United Kingdom) Gary Paffett | (Germany) Team Rosberg |
| 3 | R2 | Motorsport Arena Oschersleben | (Japan) Toshihiro Kaneishi | (Japan) Toshihiro Kaneishi | (Germany) Pierre Kaffer | (Germany) Team Kolles Racing |
| 4 | R1 | Sachsenring | (Japan) Toshihiro Kaneishi | (Japan) Kosuke Matsuura | (Germany) Markus Winkelhock | (Germany) ADAC Berlin-Brandenburg |
| 4 | R2 | Sachsenring | (Brazil) João Paulo de Oliveira | (Japan) Toshihiro Kaneishi | (Germany) Pierre Kaffer | (Germany) Team Kolles Racing |
| 5 | R1 | Norisring | (Germany) Pierre Kaffer | (United Kingdom) Gary Paffett | (Germany) Frank Diefenbacher | (Germany) Opel Team BSR |
| 5 | R2 | Norisring | (Germany) Pierre Kaffer | (Germany) Pierre Kaffer | (Japan) Toshihiro Kaneishi | (Germany) Opel Team BSR |
| 6 | R1 | Hockenheimring | (Brazil) João Paulo de Oliveira | (Germany) Tony Schmidt | (Brazil) João Paulo de Oliveira | (Switzerland) Swiss Racing Team |
| 6 | R2 | Hockenheimring | (Brazil) João Paulo de Oliveira | (Germany) Stefan Mücke | (Japan) Kosuke Matsuura | (Italy) Prema Powerteam |
| 7 | R1 | EuroSpeedway Lausitz | (Germany) Frank Diefenbacher | (Germany) Markus Winkelhock | (Germany) Markus Winkelhock | (Germany) ADAC Berlin-Brandenburg |
| 7 | R2 | EuroSpeedway Lausitz | (Germany) Frank Diefenbacher | (Germany) Frank Diefenbacher | (Germany) Frank Diefenbacher | (Germany) Opel Team BSR |
| 8 | R1 | Nürburgring | (Sweden) Björn Wirdheim | (Sweden) Björn Wirdheim | (Sweden) Björn Wirdheim | (Italy) Prema Powerteam |
| 8 | R2 | Nürburgring | (Germany) Pierre Kaffer | (Germany) Markus Winkelhock | (Germany) Pierre Kaffer | (Germany) Team Kolles Racing |
| 9 | R1 | A1-Ring | (Germany) Markus Winkelhock | (Brazil) João Paulo de Oliveira | (Japan) Toshihiro Kaneishi | (Germany) Opel Team BSR |
| 9 | R2 | A1-Ring | (Sweden) Björn Wirdheim | (Japan) Toshihiro Kaneishi | (Sweden) Björn Wirdheim | (Italy) Prema Powerteam |
| 10 | R1 | Hockenheimring | (United Kingdom) Gary Paffett | (Germany) Markus Winkelhock | (Germany) Markus Winkelhock | (Germany) ADAC Berlin-Brandenburg |
| 10 | R2 | Hockenheimring | (Germany) Stefan Mücke | (Denmark) Nicolas Kiesa | (Germany) Stefan Mücke | (Germany) ADAC Berlin-Brandenburg |

== Championship standings ==
=== Championship ===
| Pos | Driver | HOC1 | | NÜR1 | | OSC | | SAC | | NOR | | HOC2 | | LAU | | NÜR2 | | A1R | | HOC3 | | Points |
|---|---|---|---|---|---|---|---|---|---|---|---|---|---|---|---|---|---|---|---|---|---|---|
| 1 | (Japan) Toshihiro Kaneishi | 5 | 3 | 6 | 2 | 2 | **2** | **2** | 11 | 6 | 1 | Ret | 8 | 4 | 2 | 7 | 21 | 1 | 6 | 7 | 6 | 182 |
| 2 | (Germany) Stefan Mücke | 16 | 2 | 2 | 1 | Ret | 9 | Ret | Ret | 3 | Ret | 5 | 3 | 3 | 3 | 8 | 7 | 2 | 2 | 3 | **1** | 178 |
| 3 | (Germany) Frank Diefenbacher | **1** | **1** | 13 | **16** | 8 | 3 | 3 | 13 | 1 | 4 | 4 | 10 | **2** | **1** | 22 | 3 | 12 | 3 | Ret | DSQ | 172 |
| 4 | (Germany) Pierre Kaffer | 9 | 4 | **1** | 7 | 4 | 1 | Ret | **1** | **DSQ** | **2** | 8 | 5 | 6 | 10 | 5 | **1** | 9 | Ret | 8 | 19 | 156 |
| 5 | (Germany) Markus Winkelhock | 7 | 6 | 3 | 3 | **3** | 13 | 1 | Ret | 11 | Ret | 21 | 21 | 1 | 6 | 3 | 2 | **Ret** | Ret | 1 | Ret | 141 |
| 6 | (United Kingdom) Gary Paffett | 2 | Ret | 8 | 10 | 1 | Ret | 22 | Ret | 4 | 3 | Ret | Ret | 5 | 8 | 12 | 15 | 4 | 4 | **2** | 2 | 123 |
| 7 | (Brazil) João Paulo de Oliveira | 19 | 5 | 24† | 11 | 7 | 23 | Ret | **14** | 18 | Ret | **1** | **2** | 8 | Ret | 2 | 4 | 3 | 5 | 4 | 5 | 116 |
| 8 | (Japan) Kosuke Matsuura | Ret | 14 | 4 | 4 | DNS | 12 | 10 | 12 | 8 | 5 | 2 | 1 | 24 | 9 | 4 | 12 | Ret | 7 | Ret | 13 | 83 |
| 9 | (Sweden) Björn Wirdheim | 10 | 10 | Ret | 24† | 5 | 7 | Ret | Ret | 14 | 6 | Ret | Ret | Ret | 4 | **1** | 11 | 7 | **1** | Ret | 7 | 80 |
| 10 | (Germany) Tony Schmidt | 3 | Ret | Ret | 5 | 6 | 5 | 21 | Ret | 2 | 11 | 11 | 12 | 18 | 7 | 13 | Ret | 10 | Ret | 9 | Ret | 56 |
| 11 | (Italy) Matteo Grassotto | DNQ | 12 | 20 | Ret | 13 | 14 | 5 | 3 | 10 | 7 | 3 | 6 | Ret | 12 | | | | | | | 43 |
| 12 | (Italy) Raffaele Giammaria | 20 | 13 | 12 | 23† | Ret | 8 | Ret | Ret | 7 | DNQ | 6 | 9 | 17 | 20 | 18 | 18 | 5 | 9 | 6 | 4 | 41 |
| 13 | (Austria) Hannes Lachinger | Ret | Ret | 14 | Ret | 14 | 19 | 4 | Ret | 13 | 8 | 14 | 7 | 7 | 17 | 6 | 5 | 21 | Ret | 18 | 10 | 36 |
| 14 | (Finland) Kari Maenpaa | | | 11 | 12 | 16 | Ret | 6 | 2 | DNQ | DNQ | 15 | 17 | 14 | 18 | 9 | 6 | 14 | 8 | | | 32 |
| 15 | (Belgium) Tom van Bavel | 6 | 11 | 5 | 6 | 21 | 11 | 8 | 7 | 16 | Ret | 9 | Ret | 16 | Ret | Ret | 17 | 22 | Ret | 12 | 8 | 32 |
| 16 | (Finland) Kimmo Liimatainen | 12 | 9 | 7 | 25† | 15 | 10 | 18 | 8 | DNQ | DNQ | 12 | 15 | 13 | 24 | 11 | 8 | 20 | Ret | Ret | 3 | 25 |
| 17 | (Hungary) Zsolt Baumgartner | 11 | 7 | 9 | 8 | 18 | 18 | 9 | 6 | 9 | 13 | Ret | 13 | 9 | 13 | Ret | 10 | 8 | Ret | | | 25 |
| 18 | (Austria) Norbert Siedler | Ret | 22† | 16 | Ret | Ret | 15 | 12 | 4 | 20 | 18 | 7 | 4 | 11 | 15 | 20 | 13 | Ret | Ret | 14 | Ret | 24 |
| 19 | (Belgium) Nicolas Stelandre | 4 | DNS | 18 | 21 | 10 | 26 | 17 | Ret | 5 | 10 | Ret | Ret | | | | | | | | | 20 |
| 20 | (Denmark) Nicolas Kiesa | | | | | | | | | 15 | 12 | 10 | 14 | Ret | 5 | 24 | Ret | 6 | Ret | 19 | 9 | 17 |
| 21 | (Austria) Bernhard Auinger | Ret | Ret | Ret | 15 | 9 | 4 | 20 | Ret | 21 | 15 | 18 | Ret | 15 | 22 | 21 | 19 | 15 | Ret | 10 | 14 | 13 |
| 22 | (Czech Republic) Jaroslav Janiš | | | | | | | | | DNQ | 16 | 17 | 16 | 12 | Ret | 14 | 9 | 11 | Ret | 5 | 11 | 10 |
| 23 | (Austria) Gottfried Grasser | DNQ | 19 | Ret | 22 | 20 | 24 | 13 | 5 | DNQ | DNQ | 20 | 20 | 21 | 25 | Ret | 20 | 17 | Ret | Ret | 17 | 8 |
| 24 | (Austria) Robert Lechner | 13 | 16 | Ret | 9 | 17 | 6 | | | | | | | | | | | | | | | 8 |
| 25 | (Italy) Ronnie Quintarelli | | | | | | | 7 | Ret | Ret | Ret | Ret | 11 | 10 | 16 | 15 | Ret | | | | | 5 |
| 26 | (France) Laurent Delahaye | 8 | 20 | Ret | 13 | 11 | 21 | 14 | Ret | 12 | 14 | Ret | Ret | Ret | 11 | 10 | Ret | 13 | Ret | 11 | Ret | 4 |
| 27 | (United Kingdom) Andrew Kirkaldy | 17 | 8 | | | | | | | | | | | | | | | | | | | 3 |
| 28 | (Italy) Marc Caldonazzi | 14 | 18 | 22 | 18 | 22 | Ret | 16 | 9 | 22 | 17 | | | | | | | | | | | 2 |
| 29 | (Netherlands) Marco du Pau | Ret | DNQ | 17 | 19 | 12 | 16 | 11 | Ret | 19 | 9 | 13 | Ret | | | | | | | | | 2 |
| 30 | (Italy) Giuseppe Burlotti | 18 | 15 | 10 | 14 | 19 | 17 | | | | | | | | | | | | | | | 1 |
| 31 | (Austria) Marco Schärf | Ret | 21 | Ret | 20 | Ret | 25 | 23 | 10 | DNQ | DNQ | 19 | Ret | 23 | 26 | 23 | Ret | DNQ | Ret | DNS | Ret | 1 |
| 32 | (Italy) Fabrizio del Monte | Ret | 23† | 15 | Ret | Ret | 22 | 19 | Ret | DNQ | Ret | 16 | 18 | 19 | 23 | DNS | Ret | 19 | 10 | DNS | 16 | 1 |
| 33 | (Netherlands) Robert Doornbos | | | | | | | | | | | | | | | 17 | 14 | 16 | 11 | 15 | 15 | 0 |
| 34 | (Denmark) Allan Simonsen | | | | | | | | | | | | | 22 | 19 | 19 | 16 | Ret | Ret | 13 | 12 | 0 |
| 35 | (United Kingdom) Mark Mayall | | | | | | | | | | | | | | | | | Ret | 12 | | | 0 |
| 36 | (Austria) Clemens Stadler | DNQ | DNQ | | | | | | | | | | | | | | | 18 | 13 | | | 0 |
| 37 | (Australia) Ryan Briscoe | | | | | | | | | | | | | Ret | 14 | | | | | | | 0 |
| 38 | (Germany) Thomas Riethmüller | DNQ | 17 | 23 | Ret | Ret | Ret | 15 | Ret | 17 | DNQ | Ret | 19 | 20 | 21 | 16 | Ret | | | 16 | Ret | 0 |
| 39 | (United States) Phil Giebler | 15 | Ret | 19 | 17 | 23 | 20 | | | | | | | | | | | | | | | 0 |
| 40 | (Switzerland) Gilles Tinguely | | | | | | | | | | | | | | | | | | | 17 | 18 | 0 |
| 41 | (Germany) Sven Heidfeld | Ret | DNQ | 21 | Ret | | | | | | | | | | | | | | | | | 0 |
| 42 | (Germany) André Fibier | | | | | | | | | | | 22 | Ret | | | | | | | | | 0 |
| | (Brazil) Wagner Ebrahim | | | | | | | | | | | | | | | | | Ret | Ret | | | 0 |
| Pos | Driver | HOC1 | | NÜR1 | | OSC | | SAC | | NOR | | HOC2 | | LAU | | NÜR2 | | A1R | | HOC2 | | Points |

| Colour | Result |
|---|---|
| Gold | Winner |
| Silver | Second place |
| Bronze | Third place |
| Green | Points classification |
| Blue | Non-points classification |
| Blue | Non-classified finish (NC) |
| Purple | Retired, not classified (Ret) |
| Red | Did not qualify (DNQ) |
| Red | Did not pre-qualify (DNPQ) |
| Black | Disqualified (DSQ) |
| White | Did not start (DNS) |
| White | Withdrew (WD) |
| White | Race cancelled (C) |
| Blank | Did not practice (DNP) |
| Blank | Did not arrive (DNA) |
| Blank | Excluded (EX) |

**Bold** – Pole
Italics – Fastest Lap

- † — Drivers did not finish the race, but were classified as they completed over 90% of the race distance.

=== Junior-Pokal (Rookie) standings ===
| | Driver | Points |
|---|---|---|
| 1 | (Germany) Markus Winkelhock | 265 |
| 2 | (Japan) Kosuke Matsuura | 188 |
| 3 | (Austria) Hannes Lachinger | 145 |
| 4 | (Finland) Kimmo Liimatainen | 133 |
| 5 | (Czech Republic) Jaroslav Janiš | 61 |
| 6 | (Italy) Ronnie Quintarelli | 46 |
| 7 | (Italy) Fabrizio del Monte | 42 |
| 8 | (Italy) Giuseppe Burlotti | 37 |
| 9 | (Austria) Gottfried Grasser | 25 |
| 10 | (Denmark) Allan Simonsen | 18 |
| 11 | (Germany) Thomas Riethmüller | 18 |
