= 2013 Autopolis GT 300km =

Car racing competition

Layout of the Autopolis

The 2013 Autopolis GT 300 km was the seventh round of the 2013 Super GT season and the 8th points scoring race for GT300 cars. It took place on October 6, 2013, at Autopolis near Kamitsue, Oita, Japan.

== Background ==
Dome Racing drivers Frédéric Makowiecki and Naoki Yamamoto were tied on 46 points for the championship lead with Impul's João Paulo de Oliveira and Tsugio Matsuda. Following their win in at the 3 Hours of Fuji Team Mugen extended their championship lead in GT300 to 16 points over the Gainer Mercedes-Benz SLS AMG GT3 of Katsuyuki Hiranaka and Björn Wirdheim. With Autopolis being the 2nd last round of the season, instead of having weight ballast equal to twice the number of points scored in the season, teams that competed in all previous 6 races had their weight ballast reduced to the number of points they scored.

After running a 2013-spec Porsche 997 GT3, Team Taisan reverted to running a 2012-spec Porsche for balance of performance reasons. The GTA adjusted the balance of performance for both JAF-GT and FIA GT3 cars. For the JAF-GT cars the air restrictor sizes were reduced in an effort to reduce power, however The Toyota Prius was not given any adjustments. The Nissan GT-R GT3 was given a slight increase in boost pressure.

39 cars were entered for the race, the only change from the previous round was that the Dijon Racing Callaway Corvette Z06.R GT3 did not enter Autopolis.

== Report ==
=== Practice ===
The practice session began in wet conditions. The #36 Lexus Team Petronas TOM'S Lexus SC430 was the fastest car in GT500 and the #10 Gainer Mercedes-Benz SLS AMG GT3 was the fastest GT300 car. The session was red flagged 13 minutes in after Naoki Yamamoto spun off-road and crashed. The session resumed 9 minutes later but due to worsening conditions few teams completed laps on the circuit. The session was later red flagged 48 minutes in and not restarted due to poor visibility.

=== Qualifying ===
Qualifying was scheduled to be held on October 5, 2013, but due to the heavy rain and fog that cancelled the practice session, qualifying was cancelled and rescheduled to October 6. Instead of the standard 15 and 8 minute knockout sessions for both GT500 and GT300 cars, there would only be a single 25 minute session for both classes.

== Results ==
=== Qualifying ===
Pos	No	Team	Driver	Qualifying	Tyre
GT500
1	38	Lexus Team Zent Cerumo	(Japan) Yuji Tachikawa	1:38.174	B
2	23	Motul Autech NISMO	(Italy) Ronnie Quintarelli	1:38.209	M
3	18	Weider Dome Racing	(France) Frédéric Makowiecki	1:38.220	M
4	1	S-Road REITO MOLA	(Japan) Satoshi Motoyama	1:38.346	M
5	12	Calsonic Team Impul	(Brazil) João Paulo de Oliveira	1:38.385	B
6	100	Raybrig Team Kunimitsu	(Japan) Takashi Kogure	1:38.566	B
7	37	Lexus Team KeePer TOM'S	(Japan) Daisuke Ito	1:38.573	B
8	17	Keihin Real Racing	(Japan) Koudai Tsukakoshi	1:38.661	B
9	8	Autobacs Racing Team Aguri	(Republic of Ireland) Ralph Firman	1:38.725	B
10	36	Lexus Team Petronas TOM'S	(Japan) Kazuki Nakajima	1:38.856	B
11	24	D'Station ADVAN Kondo Racing	(Japan) Hironobu Yasuda	1:39.012	Y
12	6	Lexus Team LeMans ENEOS	(Japan) Kazuya Oshima	1:39.227	B
13	39	Lexus Team DENSO SARD	(Japan) Hiroaki Ishiura	1:39.569	B
14	19	Lexus Team WedsSport Bandoh	(Portugal) Andre Couto	1:39.893	Y
15	32	Epson Nakajima Racing	(Japan) Daisuke Nakajima	1:40.606	D
GT300
1	3	NDDP Racing	(Japan) Kazuki Hoshino	1:47.222	Y
2	48	Dijon Racing	(Japan) Katsumasa Chiyo	1:47.236	Y
3	50	Arnage Racing	(Japan) Hideto Yasuoka	1:48.036	Y
4	61	R&D Sport	(Japan) Kota Sasaki	1:48.408	Y
5	30	apr	(Japan) Yuki Iwasaki	1:48.416	Y
6	11	Gainer	(Japan) Katsuyuki Hiranaka	1:48.564	D
7	21	Hitotsuyama Racing	(United Kingdom) Richard Lyons	1:48.571	H
8	4	GSR Hatsune Miku	(Japan) Tatsuya Kataoka	1:48.906	Y
9	10	Gainer	(Japan) Tetsuya Tanaka	1:49.229	D
10	52	OKINAWA-IMP RACING with SHIFT	(Japan) Takeshi Tsuchiya	1:49.243	Y
11	33	Hankook KTR	(Japan) Masami Kageyama	1:49.363	H
12	87	JLOC	(Japan) Hiroki Yoshimoto	1:49.423	Y
13	22	R'Qs MotorSports	(Japan) Hisashi Wada	1:49.473	Y
14	62	Leon Racing	(Japan) Haruki Kurosawa	1:49.547	Y
15	2	Cars Tokai Dream28	(Japan) Hiroki Katoh	1:49.557	Y
16	16	Team Mugen	(Japan) Hideki Mutoh	1:49.620	B
17	360	Tomei Sports	(Japan) Takuya Shirasaka	1:49.727	Y
18	5	Team Mach	(Japan) Tetsuji Tamanaka	1:49.754	Y
19	86	JLOC	(Japan) Koji Yamanishi	1:50.032	Y
20	88	JLOC	(Japan) Manabu Orido	1:50.125	Y
21	31	apr	(Japan) Morio Nitta	1:50.406	Y
22	9	Pacific Direction Racing	(Japan) Shogo Mitsuyama	1:51.310	Y
23	0	Team Taisan Ken Endless	(Japan) Naoki Yokomizo	1:51.352	Y
24	55	Autobacs Racing Team Aguri	(Japan) Takashi Kobayashi	1:51.402	B

=== Race ===
Race result is as follows.

Pos	No	Team	Drivers	Chassis	Tyre	Time/Difference	Laps
GT500
1	36	Lexus Team Petronas TOM'S	(Japan) Kazuki Nakajima (United Kingdom) James Rossiter	Lexus SC430	B	1:55:03.613	65
2	38	Lexus Team Zent Cerumo	(Japan) Kohei Hirate (Japan) Yuji Tachikawa	Lexus SC430	B	+2.622	65
3	17	Keihin Real Racing	(Japan) Toshihiro Kaneishi (Japan) Koudai Tsukakoshi	Honda HSV-010 GT	B	+2.811	65
4	1	S-Road REITO MOLA	(Japan) Satoshi Motoyama (Japan) Yuhi Sekiguchi	Nissan GT-R	M	+11.227	65
5	18	Weider Dome Racing	(France) Frédéric Makowiecki (Japan) Naoki Yamamoto	Honda HSV-010 GT	M	+11.841	65
6	24	D'Station ADVAN Kondo Racing	(Germany) Michael Krumm (Japan) Hironobu Yasuda	Nissan GT-R	Y	+12.326	65
7	39	Lexus Team DENSO SARD	(Japan) Hiroaki Ishiura (Japan) Juichi Wakisaka	Lexus SC430	B	+12.735	65
8	23	Motul Autech NISMO	(Italy) Ronnie Quintarelli (Japan) Masataka Yanagida	Nissan GT-R	M	+24.134	65
9	37	Lexus Team KeePer TOM'S	(Italy) Andrea Caldarelli (Japan) Daisuke Ito	Lexus SC430	B	+24.474	65
10	32	Epson Nakajima Racing	(Japan) Ryo Michigami (Japan) Daisuke Nakajima	Honda HSV-010 GT	D	+46.935	65
11	6	Lexus Team LeMans ENEOS	(Japan) Yuji Kunimoto (Japan) Kazuya Oshima	Lexus SC430	B	+52.084	65
12	100	Raybrig Team Kunimitsu	(Japan) Takuya Izawa (Japan) Takashi Kogure	Honda HSV-010 GT	B	+1:18.304	65
13	19	Lexus Team WedsSport Bandoh	(Japan) Seiji Ara (Portugal) Andre Couto	Lexus SC430	Y	+1 Lap	64
14	8	Autobacs Racing Team Aguri	(Republic of Ireland) Ralph Firman (Japan) Kosuke Matsuura	Honda HSV-010 GT	B	+4 Laps	61
Ret	12	Calsonic Team Impul	(Brazil) João Paulo de Oliveira (Japan) Tsugio Matsuda	Nissan GT-R	B	+32 Laps	33
GT300
1	4	GSR Hatsune Miku	(Japan) Tatsuya Kataoka (Japan) Nobuteru Taniguchi	BMW Z4 GT3	Y	1:56:59.345	62
2	50	Arnage Racing	(Japan) Masaki Kano (Japan) Hideto Yasuoka	Aston Martin V12 Vantage GT3	Y	+1 Lap	61
3	52	OKINAWA-IMP RACING with SHIFT	(Japan) Hironori Takeuchi (Japan) Takeshi Tsuchiya	Mercedes-Benz SLS AMG GT3	Y	+1 Lap	61
4	11	Gainer	(Japan) Katsuyuki Hiranaka (Sweden) Björn Wirdheim	Mercedes-Benz SLS AMG GT3	D	+1 Lap	61
5	33	Hankook KTR	(Japan) Tomonobu Fujii (Japan) Masami Kageyama	Porsche 911 GT3-R	H	+1 Lap	61
6	30	apr	(Japan) Yuki Iwasaki (United States) Igor Sushko	Nissan GT-R GT3	Y	+1 Lap	61
7	61	R&D Sport	(Japan) Kota Sasaki (Japan) Tetsuya Yamano	Subaru BRZ	M	+1 Lap	61
8	0	Team Taisan Ken Endless	(Japan) Kyosuke Mineo (Japan) Naoki Yokomizo	Porsche 997 GT3	Y	+1 Lap	61
9	16	Team Mugen	(Japan) Hideki Mutoh (Japan) Yuhki Nakayama	Honda CR-Z	B	+2 Laps	60
10	87	JLOC	(Japan) Hideki Yamauchi (Japan) Hiroki Yoshimoto	Lamborghini Gallardo GT3	Y	+2 Laps	60
11	2	Cars Tokai Dream28	(Japan) Hiroki Katoh (Japan) Kazuho Takahashi	McLaren MP4-12C GT3	Y	+2 Laps	60
12	88	JLOC	(Japan) Takayuki Aoki (Japan) Manabu Orido	Lamborghini Gallardo GT3	Y	+2 Laps	60
13	86	JLOC	(Japan) Shinya Hosokawa (Japan) Koji Yamanishi	Lamborghini Gallardo GT3	Y	+2 Laps	60
14	22	R'Qs MotorSports	(Japan) Masaki Jyonai (Japan) Hisashi Wada	Mercedes-Benz SLS AMG GT3	Y	+2 Laps	60
15	31	apr	(Japan) Morio Nitta (Japan) Koki Saga	Toyota Prius	Y	+2 Laps	60
16	55	Autobacs Racing Team Aguri	(Japan) Takashi Kobayashi (Japan) Shinichi Takagi	Honda CR-Z	B	+2 Laps	60
17	48	Dijon Racing	(Japan) Katsumasa Chiyo (Japan) Hiroshi Takamori	Nissan GT-R GT3	Y	+2 Laps	60
18	62	Leon Racing	(Japan) Haruki Kurosawa (Japan) Tsubasa Kurosawa	Mercedes-Benz SLS AMG GT3	Y	+3 Laps	59
19	9	Pacific Direction Racing	(Japan) Shogo Mitsuyama (Japan) You Yokomaku	Porsche 911 GT3-R	Y	+4 Laps	58
20	10	Gainer	(Japan) Tetsuya Tanaka (Japan) Masayuki Ueda	Mercedes-Benz SLS AMG GT3	D	+5 Laps	57
21	21	Hitotsuyama Racing	(United Kingdom) Richard Lyons (Japan) Akihiro Tsuzuki	Audi R8 LMS ultra	H	+5 Laps	57
22	5	Team Mach	(Japan) Tetsuji Tamanaka (Japan) Junichiro Yamashita	Nissan GT-R GT3	Y	+8 Laps	54
23	360	Tomei Sports	(Japan) Takuya Shirasaka (Japan) Atsushi Tanaka	Nissan GT-R GT3	Y	+15 Laps	47
Ret	3	NDDP Racing	(Japan) Kazuki Hoshino (Japan) Daiki Sasaki	Nissan GT-R GT3	Y	+26 Laps	36

- GT500 Fastest Lap – Kohei Hirate, #38 Lexus Team Zent Cerumo Lexus SC430 – 1:40.434
- GT300 Fastest Lap – Tetsuya Yamano, #61 R&D Sport Subaru BRZ – 1:48.799

== Point rankings after the event ==
GT500 Driver Point rankings

Rank	Driver	Points
1	(Japan) Kohei Hirate (Japan) Yuji Tachikawa	58
2	(Japan) Kazuki Nakajima (United Kingdom) James Rossiter	54
3	(France) Frédéric Makowiecki (Japan) Naoki Yamamoto	52
4	(Japan) Toshihiro Kaneishi (Japan) Koudai Tsukakoshi	52
5	(Italy) Ronnie Quintarelli (Japan) Masataka Yanagida	47

GT300 Driver Point rankings

Rank	Driver	Points
1	(Japan) Hideki Mutoh (Japan) Yuhki Nakayama	70
2	(Japan) Tatsuya Kataoka (Japan) Nobuteru Taniguchi	62
3	(Japan) Katsuyuki Hiranaka (Sweden) Björn Wirdheim	60
4	(Japan) Hironori Takeuchi (Japan) Takeshi Tsuchiya	56
5	(Japan) Kota Sasaki (Japan) Tetsuya Yamano	55

- Note: Only the top five positions are included for both GT500 and GT300 classes.

Super GT
Previous race: Fuji GT 300km (Super GT Round 6); 3 Hours of Fuji (GT300 cars only)	2013 season	Next race: Motegi GT 250km
