= Giorgio Pantano =

Italian racing driver (born 1979)

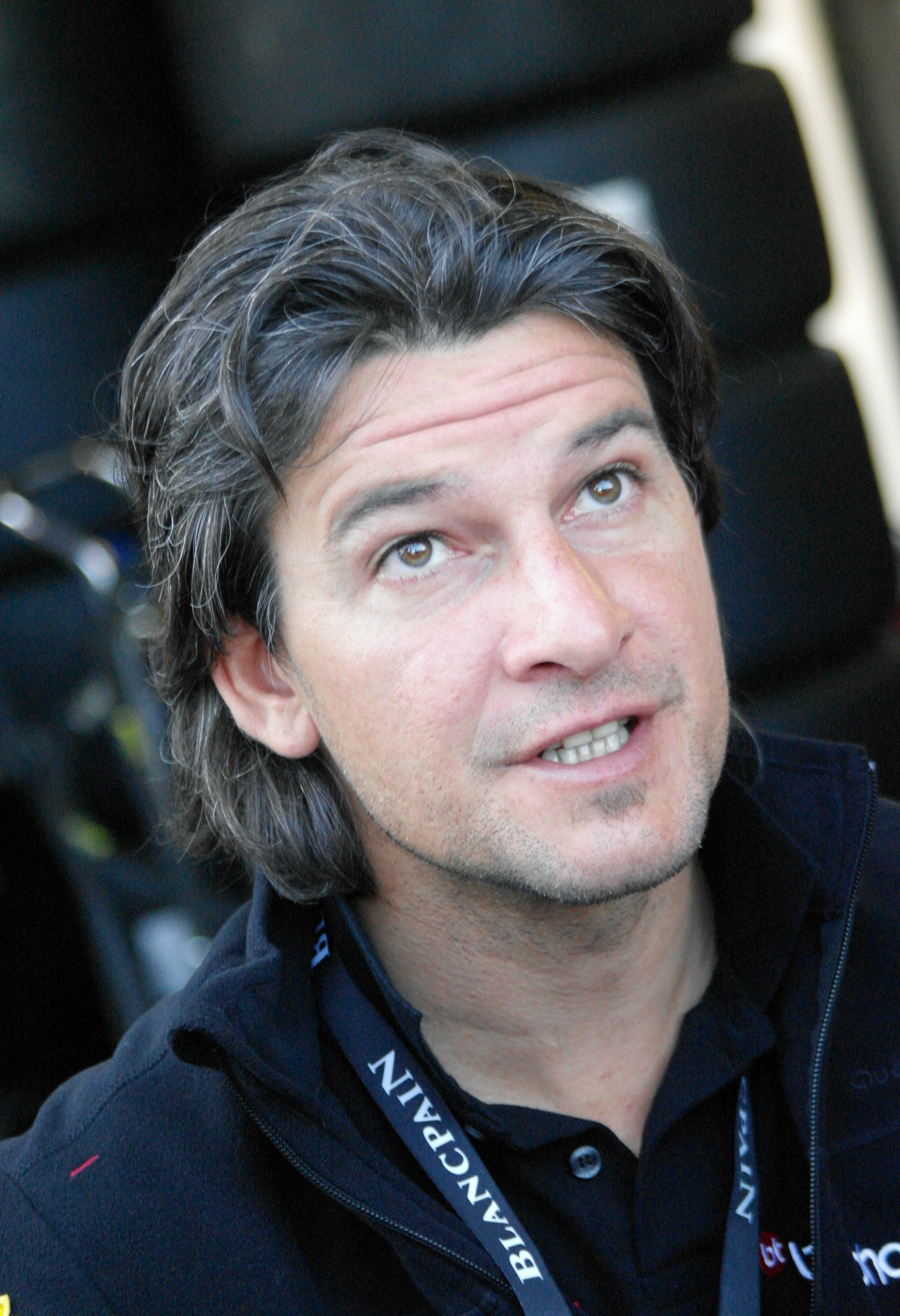
- Pantano in 2014 at Brands Hatch
- Born: 4 February 1979 (age 47) Conselve, Italy
- Categorisation: FIA Platinum
Giorgio Pantano
Formula One World Championship career
- Nationality: (Italy) Italian
- Active years: 2004
- Team: Jordan
- Entries: 14
- Championships: 0
- Wins: 0
- Podiums: 0
- Career points: 0
- Pole positions: 0
- Fastest laps: 0
- First entry: 2004 Australian Grand Prix
- Last entry: 2004 Italian Grand Prix
Giorgio Pantano
Previous series
- 2009 2008 2005–08 2005 2004 2001–03 2000–02 2000 1999 1999 1999: Superleague Formula; International GT Open; GP2 Series; IndyCar Series; Formula One; International Formula 3000; Formula One testing German Formula Three Championship; Formula Palmer Audi Winter Series; Euro Open by Nissan; British Formula 3 Championship
Championship titles
- 2008 2000: GP2 Series; German Formula Three Championship
Giorgio Pantano
IndyCar Series career
- 6 races run over 3 years
- Teams: Chip Ganassi Racing (2005 & 2012), Dreyer & Reinbold Racing (2011)
- Best finish: 26th (2005)
- First race: 2005 Argent Mortgage Indy Grand Prix
- Last race: 2012 Honda Indy 200 at Mid-Ohio

Giorgio Pantano (born 4 February 1979) is an Italian former professional racing driver who drove for the Jordan Formula One team for much of the 2004 season before being replaced by Timo Glock. He also raced in Formula 3000. He retired from racing at the end of 2014.

Pantano raced in the GP2 Series from its inaugural year in 2005 until his championship campaign in 2008, holding the record for most races competed, and most races won in the series. As of 2011, these records have been taken over by Luca Filippi (86 starts) and Pastor Maldonado (10 wins) respectively.

== Career ==
=== Early years ===
Born in Conselve, near Padua, Pantano is the holder of one of the best records ever in karting, where he started at age nine. Nico Rosberg grew up with a poster of Pantano on his bedroom wall and later would describe the Italian as being "probably the best of all time in karts." Fernando Alonso once called Pantano "invincible" and that in karting he had looked up to him as being "a really incredible talent."

In his first year in Cadet karting, Pantano achieved the Italian and European titles. In 1994, he won the Italian and World titles in Junior karting and in 1995 and 1996 won the European Formula A title. In 1996, he was signed by AMG-Mercedes, from where he went through a difficult patch to enter Formula One racing. He entered the winter series of Palmer Audi in 1999 and tested for the Astromega Formula 3000 team before signing for the KMS team that would take him to race in Formula Three in his first year of single-seater racing. He won his first race and went on to win the title.

=== F3000 ===
Pantano's first taste of Formula One came in 2000, when he was tested by Benetton. However, he joined Astromega in Formula 3000 in 2001 and won at Monza. That same year, he tested for McLaren. In 2002, he tested for Williams and Minardi, but was unable to break into Formula One, so he signed for the Durango team and won two races in the International Formula 3000 series in 2003, which earned him third place in the championship. He nearly spent 2003 in Champ Car, but the BC Motorsports team with whom he believed he had a contract proved to be fake.

=== Formula One ===
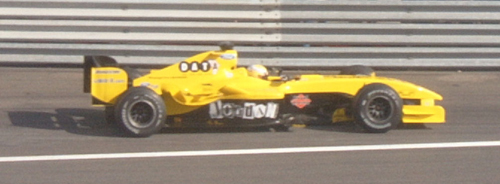
Pantano driving for Jordan at the 2004 French Grand Prix

Pantano had been all set to make his Formula One debut for Jaguar, however, two days before he was due to sign with the squad they concluded a deal with Christian Klien, who was able to bring $10 million of funding from Red Bull. Pantano instead signed for the Jordan Formula One team in early 2004, and after minimal testing his season proved troublesome. He finished last in his first race in Australia, while his more experienced teammate Nick Heidfeld retired with a transmission problem. He continued racing, never managing to qualify or finish any higher than around the back of the field, and retiring on several occasions, failing to grab much attention. He was replaced for a one-off by German debutant Timo Glock (due to financial reasons) at the Canadian Grand Prix, who scored two points finishing seventh, ahead of teammate Nick Heidfeld, who was eighth. Pantano returned to his seat in the team for the next race in United States, but went out at the first corner after colliding with other drivers. He continued with more disappointing results until the Italian Grand Prix at Monza, after which he was replaced by Glock for the remaining three races of the season. Pantano later divulged that it had been his own choice to stop racing with Jordan due to the financial burden placed on his family and his own feelings that the team was favouring his teammate Heidfeld over him. Pantano was linked to returning to Formula One in 2010 with Campos Meta but the team confirmed that Bruno Senna and Karun Chandhok would be joining the team.

=== GP2 and IndyCar ===
After his unsuccessful season in Formula One, Pantano left the series. In 2005, he raced in the inaugural GP2 Series season for the SuperNova team, alongside Adam Carroll of Northern Ireland, who defied expectations by outpacing Pantano. He also drove in the Indy Racing League for Chip Ganassi Racing in the two road-course races in the 2005 season. The team scaled back to two cars for 2006, signing champion Dan Wheldon alongside Scott Dixon. Pantano had several off-season Champ Car tests for PKV Racing and Mi-Jack Conquest Racing, but they failed to result in a ride for the season, and Pantano sat out most of the early part of the new season before finding a new lease of life in Giancarlo Fisichella's GP2 team FMS. After a crash on his first time back, Pantano impressed in the car, his experience gaining him solid points-scoring finishes in the second half of the season, including three wins. He raced for ex-Formula One driver Adrián Campos's team in 2007. On 30 June, he claimed the team's maiden victory in the series, winning a chaotic feature race in Magny-Cours.

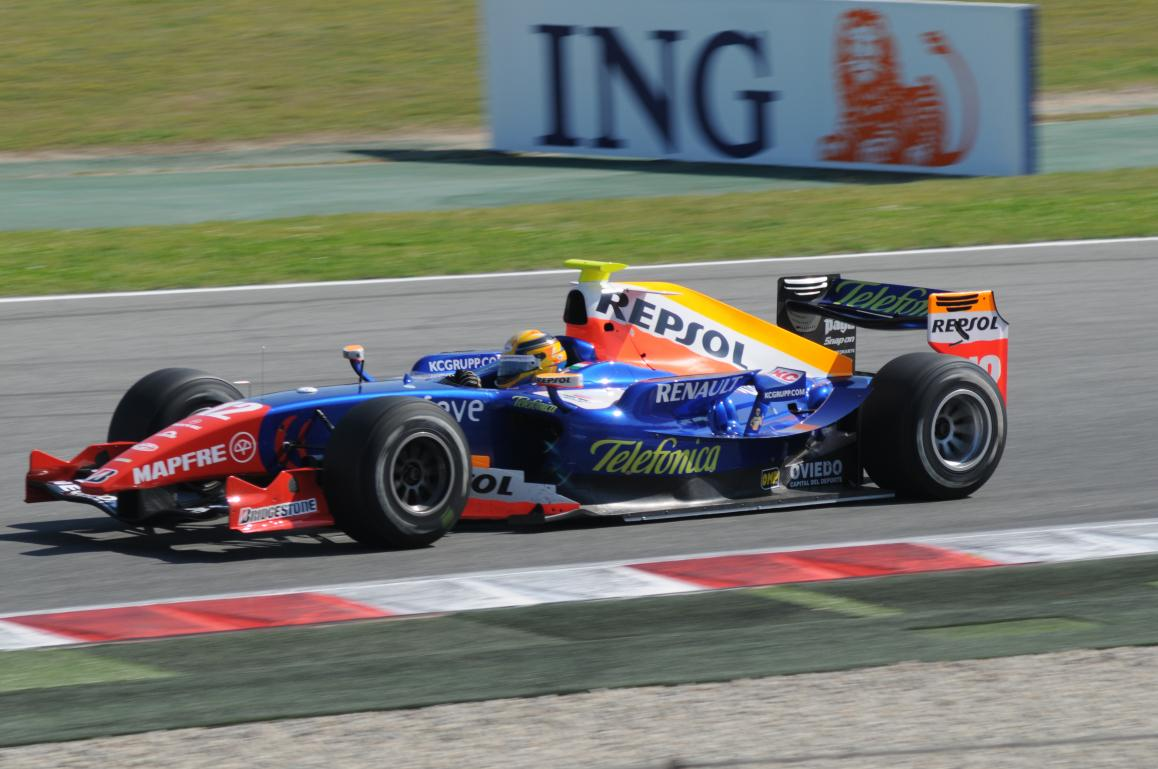
Pantano driving for Racing Engineering in 2008

For the 2008 season, Pantano signed to partner Spaniard Javier Villa at the Racing Engineering team. Pantano started the season well, taking fourth and third positions in the Catalunya feature and sprint races respectively. Things were even better in the Istanbul Park feature race, for which he took pole and won the race. After a measured drive to fourth in the sprint race, Pantano led the championship, but lost the lead to Bruno Senna following two retirements in Monaco. However, he retook the lead following a win at the Magny-Cours feature race, in which Senna retired. Despite retirement in the sprint race, Pantano left Magny-Cours with the championship lead. Following further feature race wins in both Silverstone and Hockenheimring, Pantano increased his championship lead over Senna.

A bad weekend in Hungaroring dented Pantano's advantage but he bounced back with pole for the feature race at the new Valencia. Having led the whole race in dominant style, Pantano faced the heartbreak of running out of fuel on the last lap, handing victory to Vitaly Petrov. However, Senna also ran out of fuel, and thus Pantano's lead was undamaged. With Senna retiring again in the sprint race, where Pantano finished third, the Italian held a thirteen-point lead in the series with two rounds remaining. At Spa-Francorchamps, he qualified fourth, before a mechanical problem under the safety car dropped him down the order. Attempting to fight back, he spun at La Source with two laps to go, before running into Lucas di Grassi at the same corner on the final lap, causing him to be disqualified. At Monza, he took the GP2 crown, in spite of finishing tenth. His nearest rival Bruno Senna only finished fifth, thus handing Pantano the crown.

At the Silverstone race, Pantano became the most successful driver of all time in the F1 feeder championships (F2 / F3000 / GP2). His win in the Saturday race gave him a cumulative F3000/GP2 win tally of fourteen, taking him above the 13 F2/F3000 championship wins of Mike Thackwell and twelve European championship Formula Two wins of Jochen Rindt. (If non-championship wins are included, Rindt and other drivers exceed this total). Pantano's Silverstone win was his eighth in the GP2 Series, making him also the most successful driver in GP2 history.

=== Superleague Formula ===
Unable to find a drive in Formula One and unable to return to GP2 as former champions are not permitted, Pantano joined up with Superleague Formula to drive the A.C. Milan entry. Pantano won one race for A.C. Milan at the Magny-Cours round.

=== After 2010 ===
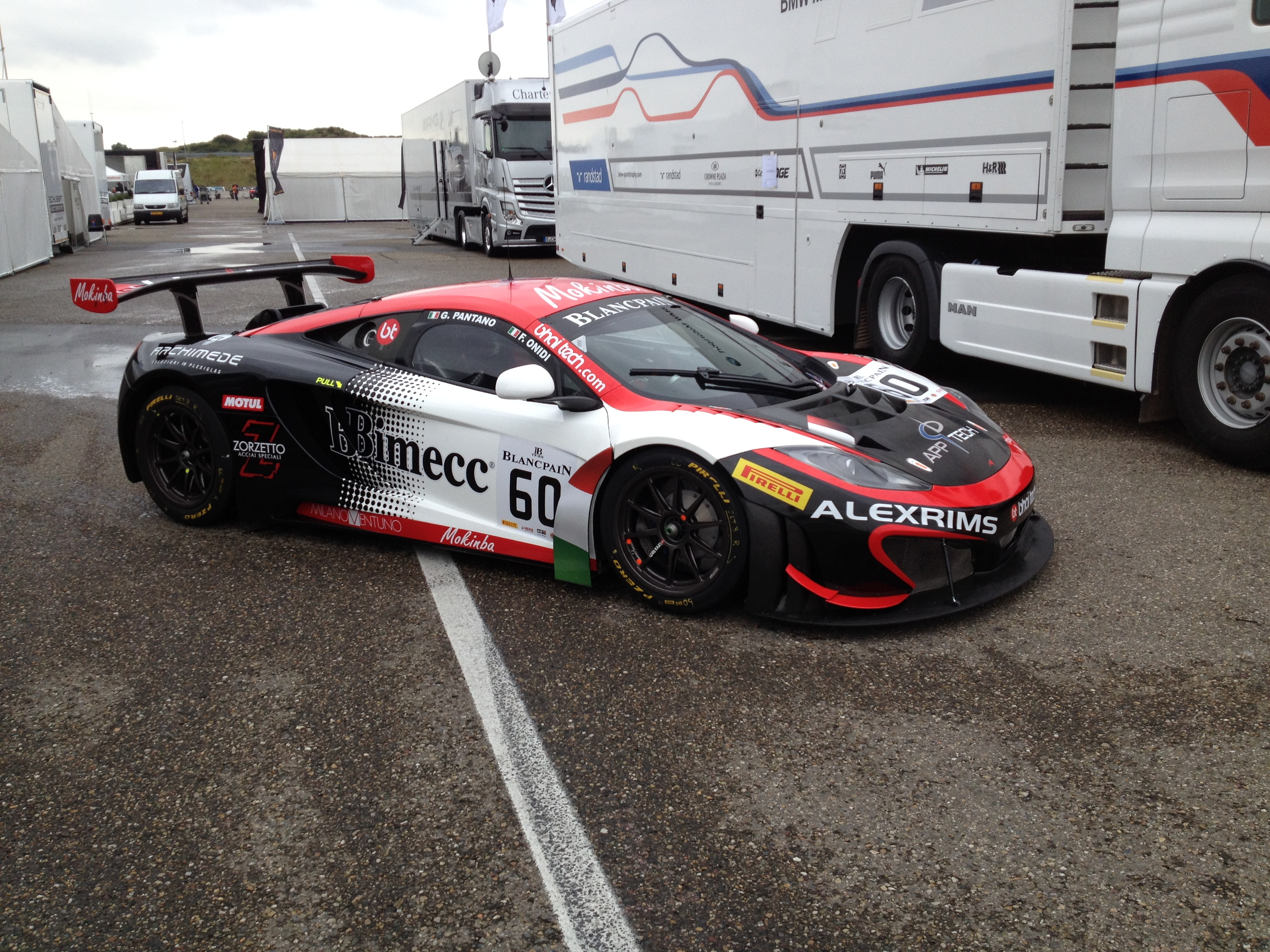
Pantano's McLaren MP4-12C from the 2014 Blancpain Sprint Series

Pantano was linked to a return to the IndyCar Series in 2010, driving a Panther Racing entry. He instead signed on to drive in Auto GP for Super Nova Racing, finishing thirteenth in the championship.

Pantano returned to the IndyCar Series in 2011 as an injury replacement for Justin Wilson in races at Sonoma and Baltimore, and did not consider to racing again in Europe in the near future.

Pantano made a brief return to IndyCar in 2012, racing at the 2012 Honda Indy 200 at Mid-Ohio for Chip Ganassi Racing. He finished fourteenth after qualifying in 24th place. In 2013, Pantano competed in the International GT Open GTS class and won the championship with three wins and five podium finishes in thirteen races. He subsequently switched to the Blancpain Sprint Series for 2014, sharing a Bhaitech-run McLaren MP4-12C with Fabio Onidi, with a view to pursuing a career as a sports car racer. He also secured a drive at the 2014 Spa 24 Hours for Thierry Boutsen's Boutsen Ginion team, sharing a McLaren with Frédéric Vervisch, Olivier Grotz and Karim Ojjeh.

== Racing record ==
=== Career summary ===
Season	Series	Team	Races	Wins	Poles	F.Laps	Podiums	Points	Position
1999	Euro Open by Nissan	Tecno Dinamica Attiva	6	0	0	0	0	7	21st
1999	British Formula Three Championship	Target Racing	1	0	0	0	0	0	NC
1999	Formula Palmer Audi Winter Series		4	0	0	0	2	52	**3rd**
2000	German Formula Three Championship	Opel Team KMS	20	3	3	5	10	205	**1st**
2000	Formula One	Mild Seven Benetton Playlife	Test Driver						
2001	International Formula 3000	Team Astromega	12	1	0	3	1	12	9th
2001	Formula One	West McLaren Mercedes	Test Driver						
2002	International Formula 3000	Coloni F3000	12	3	1	2	7	54	**2nd**
2002	Formula One	BMW WilliamsF1 Team	Test Driver						
2003	International Formula 3000	Durango	10	2	2	2	4	41	**3rd**
2004	Formula One	Jordan Grand Prix	14	0	0	0	0	0	24th
2005	GP2 Series	Super Nova Racing	23	0	1	0	6	49	6th
2005	IndyCar Series	Chip Ganassi Racing	2	0	0	0	0	48	26th
2006	GP2 Series	FMS International	15	3	0	0	4	44	5th
2007	GP2 Series	Campos Racing	21	2	1	1	6	59	**3rd**
2008	GP2 Series	Racing Engineering	19	4	4	4	7	76	**1st**
2008	International GT Open - GTS	Scuderia Latorre	2	0	0	0	1	6	25th
2009	Superleague Formula	A.C. Milan	14	1	0	0	3	286	7th
2009	Eurocup Mégane Trophy	Oregon Team	4	0	0	0	1	28	11th
2010	Auto GP	Super Nova Racing	6	0	0	1	1	8	13th
2010	Auto GP	Euronova Racing	2	0	0	0	0	8	13th
2010	Auto GP	Ombra Racing	2	0	0	0	0	8	13th
2010	Trofeo Abarth Italia	Forza Service	4	2	1	2	3	43	9th
2011	IndyCar Series	Dreyer & Reinbold Racing	3	0	0	1	0	37	36th
2012	IndyCar Series	Chip Ganassi Racing	1	0	0	0	0	16	31st
2013	International GT Open - GTS	Bhaitech	15	3	0	1	5	56	**1st**
2014	Blancpain GT Sprint Series - Pro	Bhaitech	13	0	0	0	0	19	14th
2014	Blancpain Endurance Series - Pro-Am	Boutsen Ginion Racing	1	0	0	0	0	0	NC

=== Complete Euro Open by Nissan results ===
(key)

Year	Entrant	1	2	3	4	5	6	7	8	9	10	11	12	13	14	15	16	DC	Points
1999	Tecno Dinamica Attiva	ALB; 1	ALB; 2	JER; 1	JER; 2	JAR; 1	JAR; 2	MNZ; 1 Ret	MNZ; 2; 10	JAR; 1; 15	JAR; 2; 12	DON; 1; 8	DON; 2; 8	CAT; 1	CAT; 2	VAL; 1	VAL; 2	21st	7

=== Complete German Formula Three Championship results ===
(key)

Year	Entrant	Chassis	Engine	1	2	3	4	5	6	7	8	9	10	11	12	13	14	15	16	17	18	19	20	DC	Points
2000	Opel Team KMS	Dallara F300	Opel	ZOL; 1; 1	ZOL; 2; 2	HOC1; 1; 10	**HOC1**; **2**; 2	OSC1; 1; 4	OSC1; 2; 1	NOR; 1; 2	NOR; 2 Ret	SAC; 1; 7	SAC; 2; 2	NÜR1; 1 Ret	NÜR1; 2; 10	LAU; 1; 3	LAU; 2; 5	**OSC2**; **1**; 1	**OSC2**; **2**; 2	NÜR2; 1; 8	NÜR2; 2; 11	HOC2; 1; 4	HOC2; 2; 3	1st	205

=== Complete International Formula 3000 results ===
(key) (Races in bold indicate pole position; races in italics indicate fastest lap.)

Year	Entrant	1	2	3	4	5	6	7	8	9	10	11	12	DC	Points
2001	Team Astromega	INT; Ret	IMO; 11	CAT; 9	A1R; 15	MON; Ret	NÜR; 21	MAG; 8	SIL; Ret	HOC; 7	HUN; 5	SPA; 11	MNZ; 1	9th	12
2002	Coloni F3000	INT; 8	IMO; 3	CAT; 1	A1R; 4	MON; Ret	NÜR; Ret	SIL; 4	MAG; 3	**HOC**; 1	HUN; 2	SPA; 1	MNZ; 3	**2nd**	**54**
2003	Durango	IMO; Ret	**CAT**; 1	A1R; 3	MON; Ret	NÜR; 16	**MAG**; 1	SIL; 2	HOC; 7	HUN; 4	MNZ; Ret			**3rd**	**41**

=== Complete Formula One results ===
(key)

Year	Entrant	Chassis	Engine	1	2	3	4	5	6	7	8	9	10	11	12	13	14	15	16	17	18	WDC	Points
2004	Jordan Ford	Jordan EJ14	Ford V10	AUS; 14	MAL; 13	BHR; 16	SMR; Ret	ESP; Ret	MON; Ret	EUR; 13	CAN; WD	USA; Ret	FRA; 17	GBR; Ret	GER; 15	HUN; Ret	BEL; Ret	ITA; Ret	CHN	JPN	BRA	24th	0

=== Complete GP2 Series results ===
(key) (Races in bold indicate pole position) (Races in italics indicate fastest lap)

Year	Entrant	1	2	3	4	5	6	7	8	9	10	11	12	13	14	15	16	17	18	19	20	21	22	23	DC	Points
2005	Super Nova International	IMO; FEA; 13^{†}	IMO; SPR; Ret	CAT; FEA; 13	CAT; SPR; 14	MON; FEA; Ret	**NÜR**; **FEA**; 2	NÜR; SPR; 7	MAG; FEA; 10	MAG; SPR; 7	SIL; FEA; 12	SIL; SPR; 7	HOC; FEA; 6	HOC; SPR; 2	HUN; FEA; 3	HUN; SPR; 3	IST; FEA; 2	IST; SPR; 8	MNZ; FEA; 6	MNZ; SPR; 3	SPA; FEA; NC	SPA; SPR; 11	BHR; FEA; 5	BHR; SPR; 5	6th	49
2006	Petrol Ofisi FMS International	VAL; FEA	VAL; SPR	IMO; FEA	IMO; SPR	NÜR; FEA	NÜR; SPR	CAT; FEA; 9	CAT; SPR; 7	MON; FEA; Ret	SIL; FEA; 5	SIL; SPR; 4	MAG; FEA; 6	MAG; SPR; 1	HOC; FEA; 5	HOC; SPR; 5	HUN; FEA; 3	HUN; SPR; 13	IST; FEA; Ret	IST; SPR; Ret	MNZ; FEA; 1	MNZ; SPR; 1			5th	44
2007	Campos Grand Prix	BHR; FEA; DNS	BHR; SPR; Ret	CAT; FEA; Ret	CAT; SPR; 6	MON; FEA; 2	MAG; FEA; 1	MAG; SPR; 3	SIL; FEA; Ret	SIL; SPR; 8	NÜR; FEA; 4	NÜR; SPR; 7	HUN; FEA; Ret	HUN; SPR; 7	IST; FEA; 2	IST; SPR; 12	**MNZ**; **FEA**; 1	MNZ; SPR; DSQ	SPA; FEA; Ret	SPA; SPR; 14	VAL; FEA; 2	VAL; SPR; 5			**3rd**	**59**
2008	Racing Engineering	CAT; FEA; 4	CAT; SPR; 3	**IST**; **FEA**; 1	IST; SPR; 4	MON; FEA; Ret	MON; SPR; Ret	MAG; FEA; 1	MAG; SPR; Ret	SIL; FEA; 1	SIL; SPR; 3	**HOC**; **FEA**; 1	HOC; SPR; Ret	HUN; FEA; 14	HUN; SPR; 5	**VAL**; **FEA**; 14^{†}	VAL; SPR; 3	SPA; FEA; DSQ	SPA; SPR; EX	**MNZ**; **FEA**; 10	MNZ; SPR; 5				**1st**	**76**

=== Complete IndyCar Series results ===
(key) (Races in bold indicate pole position)

Year	Team	No.	Chassis	Engine	1	2	3	4	5	6	7	8	9	10	11	12	13	14	15	16	17	18	Rank	Points	Ref
2005	Target Chip Ganassi Racing	10	Panoz	Toyota	HMS	PHX	STP	MOT	INDY	TXS	RIR	KAN	NSH	MIL	MCH	KTY	PPIR	SNM; 14	CHI	WGL; 4	FON		26th	48	
2011	Dreyer & Reinbold Racing	22	Dallara	Honda	STP	ALA	LBH	SAO	INDY	TXS	TXS	MIL	IOW	TOR	EDM	MDO	NHM	SNM; 17	BAL; 26	MOT; 16	KTY	LVS	36th	37	
2012	Chip Ganassi Racing	83	Dallara DW12	Honda	STP	ALA	LBH	SAO	INDY	DET	TXS	MIL	IOW	TOR	EDM	MDO; 14	SNM	BAL	FON				31st	16	

=== Complete Superleague Formula results ===
Year	Team	1	2	3	4	5	6	7	8	9	10	11	12	Rank	Pts
2009	A.C. Milan Azerti Motorsport	MAG; 1; 12	MAG; 2; 1	ZOL; 1; 5	ZOL; 2; 11	DON; 1; 4	DON; 2; 17	EST; 1; 6	EST; 2; 6	MNZ; 1; 15	MNZ; 2; 11	JAR; 1; 3	JAR; 2; 14	7th	286

==== Super Final Results ====
Year	Team	1	2	3	4	5	6
2009	A.C. Milan Azerti Motorsport	MAG; 2	ZOL; N/A	DON; DNQ	EST; 6	MNZ; N/A	JAR; DNQ

=== Complete Auto GP Results ===
(key) (Races in bold indicate pole position) (Races in italics indicate fastest lap)

Year	Entrant	1	2	3	4	5	6	7	8	9	10	11	12	Pos	Points
2010	Super Nova Racing	BRN; 1 Ret	BRN; 2; 9	IMO; 1; 11	IMO; 2; 9	SPA; 1; 3	SPA; 2; 6							13th	8
2010	Euronova Racing							MAG; 1; 13	MAG; 2; 11	NAV; 1	NAV; 2			13th	8
2010	Ombra Racing											MNZ; 1; 12	MNZ; 2 Ret	13th	8

=== Complete International GT Open results ===
Year	Team	Car	Class	1	2	3	4	5	6	7	8	9	10	11	12	13	14	15	16	Pos.	Points
2013	Bhai Tech Racing	McLaren MP4-12C GT3	GTS	LEC; 1; 22	LEC; 2 DNS	ALG; 1; 10	ALG; 2; 11	NÜR; 1; 6	NÜR; 2; 4	JER; 1; 19	JER; 2; 8	SIL; 1; 5	SIL; 2; 7	SPA; 1; 20	SPA; 2; 9	MNZ; 1; 1	MNZ; 2; 7	CAT; 1; 9	CAT; 2; 3	1st	56

=== Complete Blancpain Sprint Series results ===
Year	Team	Car	Class	1	2	3	4	5	6	7	8	9	10	11	12	13	14	Pos.	Points	Ref
2014	Bhaitech	McLaren MP4-12C GT3	Pro	NOG; QR; 11	NOG; CR; 8	BRH; QR; 8	BRH; CR; 16	ZAN; QR; 13	ZAN; CR; Ret	SVK; QR; Ret	SVK; CR; Ret	ALG; QR; Ret	ALG; CR; 10	ZOL; QR; 7	ZOL; CR; 6	BAK; QR; 12	BAK; CR; 7	14th	19	

Sporting positions
Preceded by Christijan Albers	German Formula Three champion 2000	Succeeded by Toshihiro Kaneishi
Preceded by Timo Glock	GP2 Series; Drivers' Champion; 2008	Succeeded by Nico Hülkenberg
