= 2013 Fuji GT 500km =

Track map of the Fuji Speedway

The 2013 Fuji GT 500km was the second round of the 2013 Super GT season. It took place on April 29, 2013.

== Race result ==
Race result is as follows.

Pos	No	Team	Drivers	Chassis	Tyre	Time/Difference	Laps
GT500
1	36	Lexus Team Petronas TOM'S	(Japan) Kazuki Nakajima (United Kingdom) James Rossiter	Lexus SC430	B	2:56:05.647	110
2	38	Lexus Team Zent Cerumo	(Japan) Kohei Hirate (Japan) Yuji Tachikawa	Lexus SC430	B	+3.373	110
3	6	Lexus Team LeMans ENEOS	(Japan) Yuji Kunimoto (Japan) Kazuya Oshima	Lexus SC430	B	+20.075	110
4	39	Lexus Team DENSO SARD	(Japan) Hiroaki Ishiura (Japan) Juichi Wakisaka	Lexus SC430	B	+24.320	110
5	12	Calsonic Team Impul	(Brazil) João Paulo de Oliveira (Japan) Tsugio Matsuda	Nissan GT-R	B	+41.542	110
6	37	Lexus Team KeePer TOM'S	(Italy) Andrea Caldarelli (Japan) Daisuke Ito	Lexus SC430	B	+42.964	110
7	100	Raybrig Team Kunimitsu	(Japan) Takuya Izawa (Japan) Takashi Kogure	Honda HSV-010 GT	B	+1:32.512	110
8	8	Autobacs Racing Team Aguri	(Republic of Ireland) Ralph Firman (Japan) Kosuke Matsuura	Honda HSV-010 GT	B	+1:33.447	110
9	1	S-Road REITO MOLA	(Japan) Satoshi Motoyama (Japan) Yuhi Sekiguchi	Nissan GT-R	MI	+1 Lap	109
10	18	Weider Dome Racing	(France) Frédéric Makowiecki (Japan) Naoki Yamamoto	Honda HSV-010 GT	MI	+1 Lap	109
11	19	Lexus Team WedsSport Bandoh	(Japan) Seiji Ara (Portugal) Andre Couto	Lexus SC430	Y	+1 Lap	109
12	24	D'Station ADVAN Kondo Racing	(Germany) Michael Krumm (Japan) Hironobu Yasuda	Nissan GT-R	Y	+1 Lap	109
13	32	Epson Nakajima Racing	(Japan) Ryo Michigami (Japan) Daisuke Nakajima	Honda HSV-010 GT	D	+2 Laps	108
Ret	23	Motul Autech NISMO	(Italy) Ronnie Quintarelli (Japan) Masataka Yanagida	Nissan GT-R	MI	+92 Laps	18
Ret	17	Keihin Real Racing	(Japan) Toshihiro Kaneishi (Japan) Koudai Tsukakoshi	Honda HSV-010 GT	B	+107 Laps	3
GT300
1	31	apr	(Japan) Morio Nitta (Japan) Koki Saga	Toyota Prius	Y	2:57:27.210	103
2	16	Team Mugen	(Japan) Hideki Mutoh (Japan) Yuhki Nakayama	Honda CR-Z	B	+17.403	103
3	86	JLOC	(Japan) Shinya Hosokawa (Japan) Koji Yamanishi (Japan) Yuya Sakamoto	Lamborghini Gallardo GT3	Y	+1 Lap	102
4	52	OKINAWA-IMP RACING with SHIFT	(Japan) Hironori Takeuchi (Japan) Takeshi Tsuchiya	Mercedes-Benz SLS AMG GT3	Y	+1 Lap	102
5	7	Bonds Racing	(Japan) Yuji Ide (United States) Igor Sushko	Nissan GT-R GT3	Y	+1 Lap	102
6	11	Gainer	(Japan) Katsuyuki Hiranaka (Sweden) Björn Wirdheim	Mercedes-Benz SLS AMG GT3	D	+1 Lap	102
7	87	JLOC	(Japan) Hideki Yamauchi (Japan) Hiroki Yoshimoto	Lamborghini Gallardo GT3	Y	+1 Lap	102
8	62	Leon Racing	(Japan) Masanobu Kato (Japan) Haruki Kurosawa	Mercedes-Benz SLS AMG GT3	Y	+1 Lap	102
9	4	GSR Hatsune Miku	(Japan) Tatsuya Kataoka (Japan) Nobuteru Taniguchi	BMW Z4 GT3	Y	+2 Laps	101
10	10	Gainer	(Japan) Tetsuya Tanaka (Japan) Masayuki Ueda	Mercedes-Benz SLS AMG GT3	D	+2 Laps	101
11	48	Dijon Racing	(Japan) Katsumasa Chiyo (Japan) Hiroshi Takamori	Nissan GT-R GT3	Y	+2 Laps	101
12	88	JLOC	(Japan) Takayuki Aoki (Japan) Manabu Orido	Lamborghini Gallardo GT3	Y	+2 Laps	101
13	22	R'Qs MotorSports	(Japan) Masaki Jyonai (Japan) Hisashi Wada	Mercedes-Benz SLS AMG GT3	Y	+2 Laps	101
14	9	Pacific Direction Racing	(Japan) Shogo Mitsuyama (Japan) You Yokomaku	Porsche 911 GT3-R	Y	+2 Laps	101
15	30	apr	(Malaysia) Fairuz Fauzy (Japan) Yuki Iwasaki (Japan) Kenji Kobayashi	Audi R8 LMS ultra	Y	+3 Laps	101
16	33	Hankook KTR	(Japan) Tomonobu Fujii (Japan) Masami Kageyama	Porsche 911 GT3-R	HK	+3 Laps	100
17	5	Team Mach	(Japan) Naofumi Omoto (Japan) Tetsuji Tamanaka (Japan) Junichiro Yamashita	Ferrari 458 Italia GT3	Y	+4 Laps	99
18	2	Cars Tokai Dream28	(Japan) Hiroki Katoh (Japan) Kazuho Takahashi	McLaren MP4-12C GT3	Y	+17 Laps	86
19	55	Autobacs Racing Team Aguri	(Japan) Takashi Kobayashi (Japan) Shinichi Takagi	Honda CR-Z	B	+24 Laps	79
NC	0	Team Taisan Ken Endless	(Japan) Kyosuke Mineo (Japan) Naoki Yokomizo	Porsche 997 GT3	Y	+94 Laps	9
Ret	96	DIJON Racing	(Japan) Keiichi Inoue (Japan) Masaki Tanaka	Callaway Corvette Z06.R GT3	Y	+35 Laps	68
Ret	360	Tomei Sports	(Japan) Takuya Shirasaka (Japan) Atsushi Tanaka	Nissan GT-R GT3	Y	+50 Laps	53
Ret	21	Hitotsuyama Racing	(United Kingdom) Richard Lyons (Japan) Akihiro Tsuzuki	Audi R8 LMS ultra	HK	+54 Laps	49
Ret	3	NDDP Racing	(Japan) Kazuki Hoshino (Japan) Daiki Sasaki	Nissan GT-R GT3	Y	+68 Laps	35
Ret	50	Arnage Racing	(Japan) Masaki Kano (Japan) Ryohei Sakaguchi (Japan) Hideto Yasuoka	Aston Martin V12 Vantage GT3	Y	+94 Laps	9
Ret	61	R&D Sport	(Japan) Kota Sasaki (Japan) Tetsuya Yamano	Subaru BRZ	MI	+100 Laps	3

Super GT
Previous race: Okayama GT 300km	2013 season	Next race: International Series Malaysia
