= 2013 3 Hours of Fuji =

Japanese car race in 2013

Track map of the Fuji Speedway

The 2013 3 Hours of Fuji was the second round of the 2013 Asian Le Mans Series season and the seventh points scoring race for GT300 cars in the 2013 Super GT season. It took place on September 22, 2013, at the Fuji Speedway in Oyama, Shizuoka, Japan.

== Race result ==
Race result is as follows. Class winners in bold.

Pos	Class	No	Team	Drivers	Chassis	Tyre	Laps
Pos	Class	No	Team	Drivers	Engine	Tyre	Laps
1	**LMP2**	**18**	**(Hong Kong) KCMG**	**(United Kingdom) Richard Bradley (Japan) Hiroshi Koizumi (United Kingdom) James Winslow**	**Morgan LMP2**	MI	**108**
1	**LMP2**	**18**	**(Hong Kong) KCMG**	**(United Kingdom) Richard Bradley (Japan) Hiroshi Koizumi (United Kingdom) James Winslow**	**Nissan VK45DE 4.5 L V8**	MI	**108**
2	LMP2	24	(France) OAK Racing	(China) Cong Fu Cheng (United States) David Cheng (Taiwan) Jeffrey Lee	Morgan LMP2	MI	108
2	LMP2	24	(France) OAK Racing	(China) Cong Fu Cheng (United States) David Cheng (Taiwan) Jeffrey Lee	Judd HK 3.6 L V8	MI	108
3	**SGT**	**16**	**(Japan) Team Mugen**	**(Japan) Hideki Mutoh (Japan) Yuhki Nakayama**	**Honda CR-Z**	B	**106**
3	**SGT**	**16**	**(Japan) Team Mugen**	**(Japan) Hideki Mutoh (Japan) Yuhki Nakayama**	**Honda J35A 2.8 L V6 Hybrid**	B	**106**
4	SGT	11	(Japan) Gainer	(Japan) Katsuyuki Hiranaka (Sweden) Björn Wirdheim	Mercedes-Benz SLS AMG GT3	D	106
4	SGT	11	(Japan) Gainer	(Japan) Katsuyuki Hiranaka (Sweden) Björn Wirdheim	Mercedes-Benz M159 6.2 L V8	D	106
5	SGT	61	(Japan) R&D Sport	(Japan) Kota Sasaki (Japan) Tetsuya Yamano	Subaru BRZ	MI	105
5	SGT	61	(Japan) R&D Sport	(Japan) Kota Sasaki (Japan) Tetsuya Yamano	Subaru EJ20 2.0 L Turbo Flat-4	MI	105
6	SGT	0	(Japan) Team Taisan Ken Endless	(Japan) Kyosuke Mineo (Japan) Naoki Yokomizo	Porsche 997 GT3	Y	104
6	SGT	0	(Japan) Team Taisan Ken Endless	(Japan) Kyosuke Mineo (Japan) Naoki Yokomizo	Porsche M97/79 4.0 L Flat-6	Y	104
7	SGT	2	(Japan) Cars Tokai Dream28	(Japan) Hiroki Katoh (Japan) Kazuho Takahashi	McLaren MP4-12C GT3	Y	104
7	SGT	2	(Japan) Cars Tokai Dream28	(Japan) Hiroki Katoh (Japan) Kazuho Takahashi	McLaren 3.8 L Turbo V8	Y	104
8	**GTC**	**007**	**(Hong Kong) Craft Racing**	**(United Kingdom) Richard Lyons (Hong Kong) Frank Yu**	**Aston Martin V12 Vantage GT3**	MI	**103**
8	**GTC**	**007**	**(Hong Kong) Craft Racing**	**(United Kingdom) Richard Lyons (Hong Kong) Frank Yu**	**Aston Martin 6.0 L V12**	MI	**103**
9	GTC	77	(Italy) AF Corse	(Italy) Andrea Bertolini (Italy) Michele Rugolo (Australia) Steve Wyatt	Ferrari 458 Italia GT3	MI	103
9	GTC	77	(Italy) AF Corse	(Italy) Andrea Bertolini (Italy) Michele Rugolo (Australia) Steve Wyatt	**Ferrari F142 4.5 L V8**	MI	103
10	SGT	52	(Japan) Gainer	(Japan) Hironori Takeuchi (Japan) Takeshi Tsuchiya (Japan) Motoyoshi Yoshida	Mercedes-Benz SLS AMG GT3	Y	103
10	SGT	52	(Japan) Gainer	(Japan) Hironori Takeuchi (Japan) Takeshi Tsuchiya (Japan) Motoyoshi Yoshida	Mercedes-Benz M159 6.2 L V8	Y	103
11	SGT	5	(Japan) Team Mach	(Japan) Tetsuji Tamanaka (Japan) Naoya Yamano	Nissan GT-R GT3	Y	103
11	SGT	5	(Japan) Team Mach	(Japan) Tetsuji Tamanaka (Japan) Naoya Yamano	Nissan VR38DETT 3.8 L Turbo V6	Y	103
12	**LMGTE**	**70**	**(Japan) Team Taisan Ken Endless**	**(Japan) Akira Iida (Japan) Shogo Mitsuyama (Japan) Shinji Nakano**	**Ferrari 458 Italia GT2**	MI	**101**
12	**LMGTE**	**70**	**(Japan) Team Taisan Ken Endless**	**(Japan) Akira Iida (Japan) Shogo Mitsuyama (Japan) Shinji Nakano**	**Ferrari F142 4.5 L V8**	MI	**101**
13	GTC	9	(Japan) Pacific Direction Racing	(Japan) Akira Mizutani (Japan) Yuya Sakamoto (Japan) You Yokomaku	Porsche 997 GT3	MI	100
13	GTC	9	(Japan) Pacific Direction Racing	(Japan) Akira Mizutani (Japan) Yuya Sakamoto (Japan) You Yokomaku	Porsche M97/79 4.0 L Flat-6	MI	100
14	GTC	26	(Japan) Taisan Ken Endless	(Japan) Akihiro Asai (Japan) Naoya Gamou	Porsche 996 GT3-RS	MI	100
14	GTC	26	(Japan) Taisan Ken Endless	(Japan) Akihiro Asai (Japan) Naoya Gamou	Porsche 3.6 L Flat-6	MI	100
15	GTC	91	(Taiwan) Team AAI Rstrada	(Taiwan) Jun San Chen (Germany) Marco Seefried (Japan) Tatsuya Tanigawa	McLaren MP4-12C GT3	MI	99
15	GTC	91	(Taiwan) Team AAI Rstrada	(Taiwan) Jun San Chen (Germany) Marco Seefried (Japan) Tatsuya Tanigawa	McLaren 3.8 L Turbo V8	MI	99
16	SGT	62	(Japan) Leon Racing	(Japan) Haruki Kurosawa (Japan) Tsubasa Kurosawa	Mercedes-Benz SLS AMG GT3	Y	84
16	SGT	62	(Japan) Leon Racing	(Japan) Haruki Kurosawa (Japan) Tsubasa Kurosawa	Mercedes-Benz M159 6.2 L V8	Y	84
Ret	GTC	37	(China) BBT Racing	(China) Anthony Liu (Italy) Davide Rizzo (Italy) Massimilliano Wiser	Lamborghini Gallardo FLII GT3	MI	98
Ret	GTC	37	(China) BBT Racing	(China) Anthony Liu (Italy) Davide Rizzo (Italy) Massimilliano Wiser	Lamborghini 5.2 L V10	MI	98
Ret	GTC	92	(Taiwan) Team AAI Rstrada	(Taiwan) Morris Chen (Japan) Yasushi Kikuchi	McLaren MP4-12C GT3	MI	63
Ret	GTC	92	(Taiwan) Team AAI Rstrada	(Taiwan) Morris Chen (Japan) Yasushi Kikuchi	McLaren 3.8 L Turbo V8	MI	63
Ret	SGT	30	(Japan) apr	(Japan) Yuki Iwasaki (Japan) Kenji Kobayashi (United States) Igor Sushko	Nissan GT-R GT3	Y	44
Ret	SGT	30	(Japan) apr	(Japan) Yuki Iwasaki (Japan) Kenji Kobayashi (United States) Igor Sushko	Nissan VR38DETT 3.8 L Turbo V6	Y	44
Ret	SGT	55	(Japan) Team Mugen	(Japan) Takashi Kobayashi (Japan) Tomoki Nojiri (Japan) Shinichi Takagi	Honda CR-Z	B	34
Ret	SGT	55	(Japan) Team Mugen	(Japan) Takashi Kobayashi (Japan) Tomoki Nojiri (Japan) Shinichi Takagi	Honda J35A 2.8 L V6 Hybrid	B	34

Asian Le Mans Series
Previous race: 3 Hours of Inje	2013 season	Next race: 3 Hours of Zhuhai

Super GT
Previous race: Fuji GT 300km	2013 season	Next race: Autopolis GT 300km
