= Frank Diefenbacher =

German auto racing driver

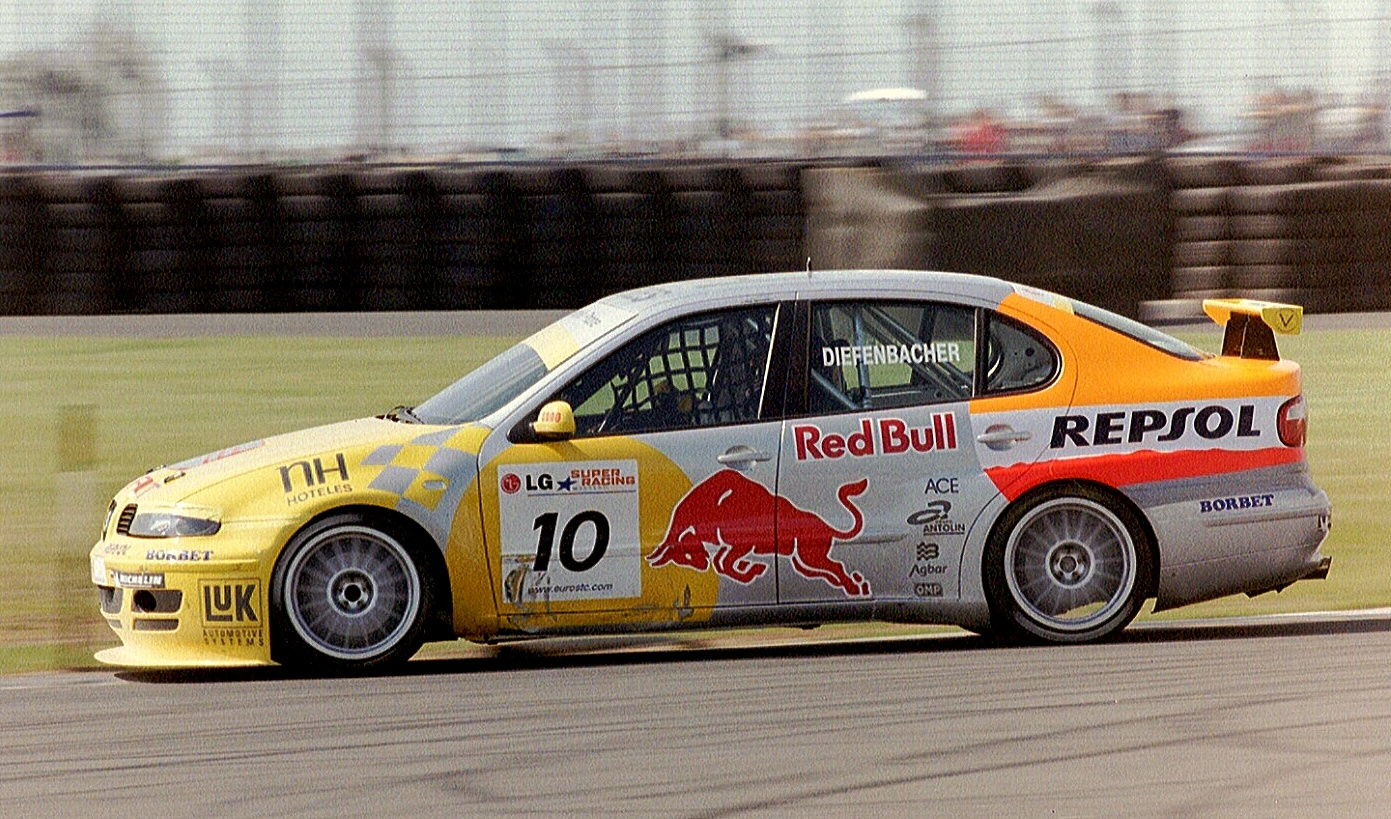
- Diefenbacher at Donington Park during the 2003 European Touring Car Championship.
- Nationality: (Germany) German
- Born: 19 March 1982 (age 44) Pforzheim, Germany
- Categorisation: FIA Gold (until 2011); FIA Silver (2012–2014)

Frank Diefenbacher (born 19 March 1982 in Pforzheim) is a German auto racing driver.

== Career ==
Diefenbacher won the German Junior Kart Championship in 1996. His first steps out of karting were in Formula Ford in Germany in 1998, where he finished third. He finished fourth in Formula König in 1999.

Diefenbacher stepped up to the German Formula Three Championship in 2000. He finished tenth in his first year, but improved in 2001 to finish third, before finishing fourth in 2002.

In 2003, Diefenbacher was signed by SEAT Sport for their European Touring Car Championship campaign. In 2003 he beat teammate Jordi Gené in the final standings to finish 15th, and finished 11th in 2004, tied on points with new teammate and experienced touring car driver Rickard Rydell.

Diefenbacher was not retained by SEAT for their World Touring Car Championship campaign in 2005. He did join the RS Line team to compete in selected rounds. However, Diefenbacher suffered a heavy accident during practice for his first race of the season, the Race of France at Circuit de Nevers Magny-Cours, which kept him on the sidelines for the rest of the year.

Diefenbacher returned to racing in 2006, competing in the first race of the FIA GT Championship for the Race Alliance team, although his car retired on the first lap.
