= Toshihiro Kaneishi =

Japanese racing driver

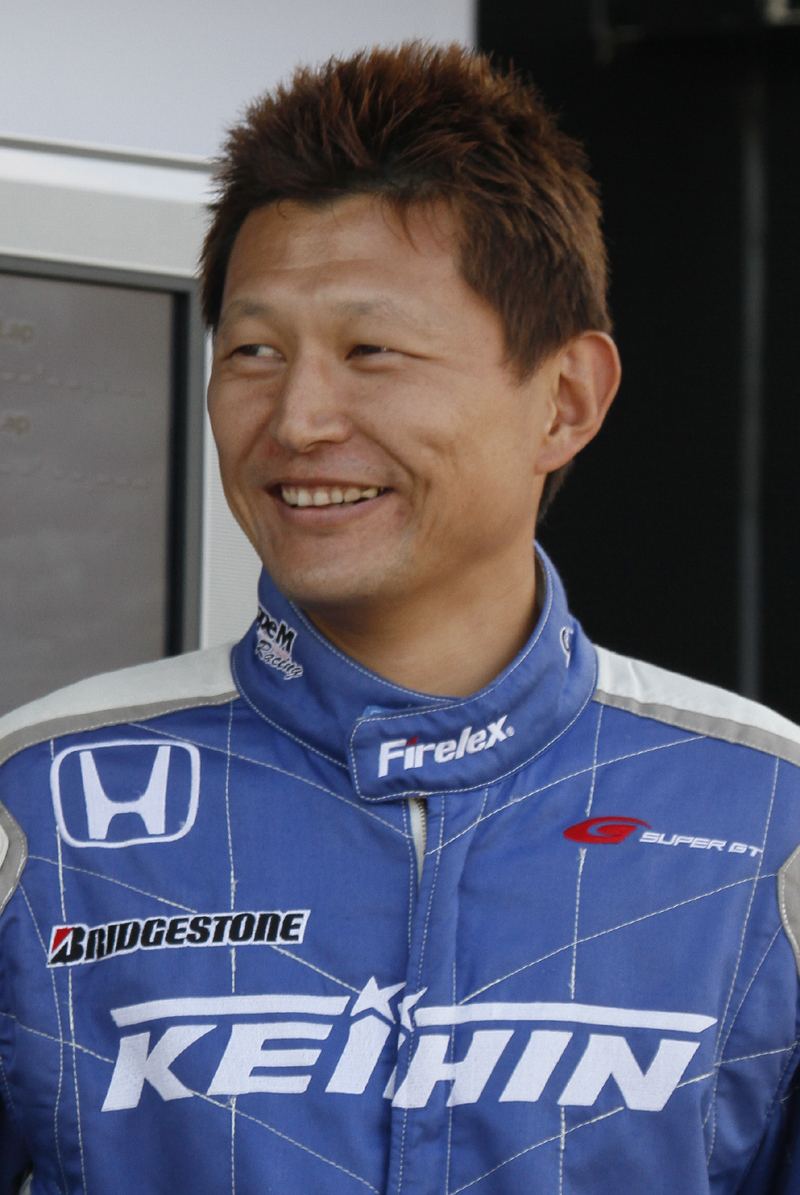
- Kaneishi in 2010.
- Nationality: (Japan) Japanese
- Born: December 19, 1978 (age 47) Osaka Prefecture (Japan)
- Relatives: Katsutomo Kaneishi (cousin)

Super GT career
- Debut season: JGTC
- Current team: Real Racing
- Car number: 17
- Former teams: Autobacs Racing Team Aguri, Hasemi Motorsport, Team Kunimitsu
- Starts: 83
- Wins: 1
- Best finish: 2nd in 2013

Previous series
- 2002–04, 06–08, 12: Formula Nippon

Championship titles
- 2001: German Formula Three Championship

Toshihiro Kaneishi (金石 年弘, Kaneishi Toshihiro; born December 19, 1978 in Osaka Prefecture, Japan) is a Japanese racing driver. He has competed in such series as Formula Nippon and Super GT.

== Racing record ==
=== Complete Japanese Formula 3 results ===
(key) (Races in bold indicate pole position) (Races in italics indicate fastest lap)

Year	Team	engine	1	2	3	4	5	6	7	8	9	10	DC	Pts
1998	Autobacs Racing Team Aguri	Mugen	SUZ; 7	TSU; 7	MIN; 4	FUJ; 11	MOT; 8	SUZ; 3	SUG; 2	TAI; 7	SEN; 5	SUG; 12	6th	15
1999	Dome Ltd.	Mugen	SUZ; 3	TSU; Ret	FUJ; 6	MIN; 5	FUJ; 7	SUZ; 2	SUG; 4	TAI; 7	**MOT**; 1	SUZ; 1	2rd	34

=== Complete German Formula Three results ===
(key) (Races in bold indicate pole position) (Races in italics indicate fastest lap)

Year	Entrant	Engine	1	2	3	4	5	6	7	8	9	10	11	12	13	14	15	16	17	18	19	20	DC	Pts
2000	GM Motorsport	Opel	ZOL; 1; 18	ZOL; 2; 9	HOC; 1; 6	HOC; 2; 6	OSC; 1; 19	OSC; 2; 12	NOR; 1; 7	NOR; 2; 6	SAC; 1	SAC; 2	NÜR; 1 Ret	NÜR; 2; 1	LAU; 1; 14	LAU; 2; 16	OSC; 1; 9	OSC; 2; 8	NÜR; 1; 4	NÜR; 2; 2	HOC; 1; 5	HOC; 2; 19	8th	82
2001	Opel Team BSR	Opel	HOC; 1; 5	HOC; 2; 3	NÜR; 1; 6	NÜR; 2; 2	OSC; 1; 2	**OSC**; **2**; 2	**SAC**; **1**; 2	SAC; 2; 11	NOR; 1; 6	NOR; 2; 1	HOC; 1 Ret	HOC; 2; 8	LAU; 1; 4	LAU; 2; 2	NÜR; 1; 7	NÜR; 2; 21	A1R; 1; 1	A1R; 2; 6	HOC; 1; 7	HOC; 2; 6	1st	182

=== Complete JGTC/Super GT results ===
(key) (Races in bold indicate pole position) (Races in italics indicate fastest lap)

Year	Team	Car	Class	1	2	3	4	5	6	7	8	9	DC	Pts
2002	Team Kunimitsu with Mooncraft	Honda NSX	GT500	TAI	FUJ; 5	SUG	SEP	FUJ	MOT	MIN	SUZ		20th	8
2003	Autobacs Racing Team Aguri	Honda NSX	GT500	TAI; 11	FUJ; Ret	SUG; 11	FUJ	FUJ; 12	MOT; 8	AUT; Ret	SUZ; 6		19th	9
2004	Hasemi Motorsport	Nissan Fairlady Z	GT500	TAI; 6	SUG; 6	SEP; 4	**TOK**; 3	MOT; 7	AUT; Ret	SUZ; 3			4th	50
2005	Hasemi Motorsport	Nissan Fairlady Z	GT500	OKA; 3	FUJ; 9	SEP; Ret	SUG; 15	MOT; 13	FUJ; 4	AUT; 3	SUZ; 4		8th	42
2006	Autobacs Racing Team Aguri	Honda NSX	GT500	SUZ	OKA	FUJ	SEP	SUG	SUZ; 6	MOT	AUT	FUJ	22nd	13
2007	Real Racing	Honda NSX	GT500	SUZ; 6	OKA; 10	FUJ; Ret	SEP; 12	SUG; Ret	SUZ; 5	MOT; 7	AUT; Ret	FUJ; 3	14th	29
2008	Real Racing	Honda NSX	GT500	SUZ; 8	OKA; 16	FUJ; 10	SEP; 6	SUG; 9	SUZ; Ret	MOT; 15	AUT; 11	**FUJ**; 10	19th	16
2009	Real Racing	Honda NSX	GT500	OKA; 5	SUZ; 6	FUJ; 12	SEP; 2	SUG; 6	SUZ; 10	FUJ; 4	AUT; Ret	MOT; 3	5th	51
2010	Real Racing	Honda HSV-010 GT	GT500	SUZ; 7	OKA; 7	FUJ; 5	SEP; 12	SUG; 1	SUZ; 4	FUJ; C	MOT; 3		3rd	53
2011	Real Racing	Honda HSV-010 GT	GT500	**OKA**; 3	FUJ; 8	SEP; 3	SUG; 6	SUZ; 12	FUJ; 3	AUT; 6	MOT; 7		4th	50
2012	Real Racing	Honda HSV-010 GT	GT500	OKA; 3	FUJ; 6	SEP; 7	SUG; 9	SUZ; 10	FUJ; 5	AUT; 14	MOT; Ret		12th	30
2013	Real Racing	Honda HSV-010 GT	GT500	OKA; 2	FUJ; Ret	SEP; 5	SUG; Ret	SUZ; 7	FUJ; 2	AUT; 3	MOT; 2		2nd	67
2014	Real Racing	Honda NSX-GT	GT500	OKA; 6	FUJ; Ret	AUT; Ret	SUG; 3	FUJ; 4	SUZ; Ret	BUR; 12	MOT; 15		12th	24

Sporting positions
Preceded by Giorgio Pantano	German Formula Three champion 2001	Succeeded by Gary Paffett
