= Mercedes-Benz SLS AMG =

2-seater front mid-engine sports car developed by Mercedes-AMG

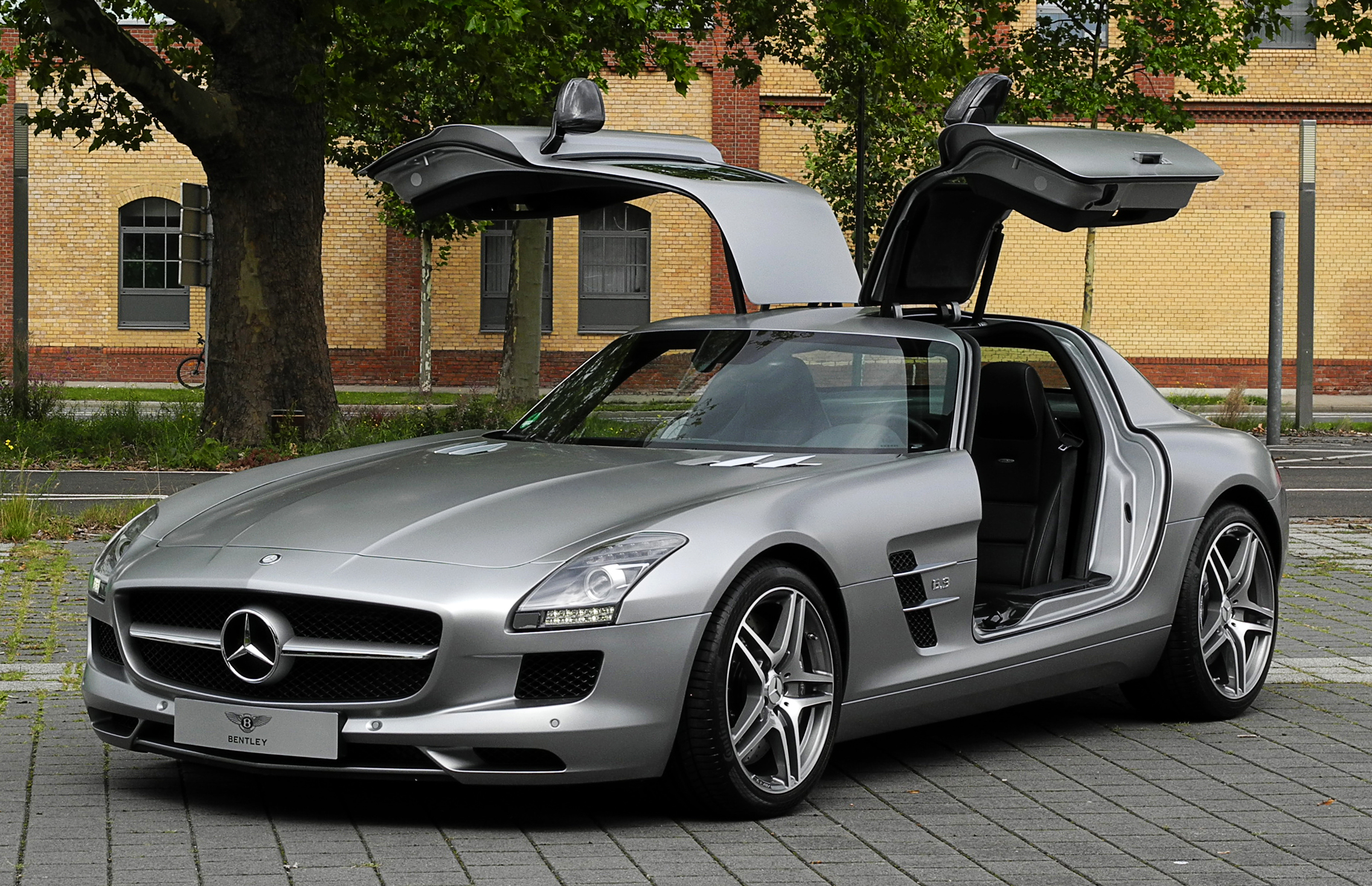

Overview
- Manufacturer: Mercedes-AMG
- Model code: C197 (Coupe); R197 (Roadster)
- Production: January 2010–2014
- Model years: 2010–2015
- Assembly: Germany: Sindelfingen
- Designer: Mark Fetherston (2007)

Body and chassis
- Class: Sports car/Grand Tourer (S)
- Body style: 2-door coupe 2-door roadster (soft top convertible)
- Layout: Front mid-engine, rear-wheel-drive; Quad-motor, all-wheel drive (SLS AMG Electric drive only)
- Doors: Gull-wing; Conventional (roadster)

Powertrain
- Engine: 6.2 L M159 V8
- Transmission: 7-speed Getrag 7DCL750 dual-clutch automatic

Dimensions
- Wheelbase: 2,680 mm (105.5 in)
- Length: 4,638 mm (182.6 in)
- Width: 1,939 mm (76.3 in)
- Height: Coupé: 1,252 mm (49.3 in); Roadster: 1,262 mm (49.7 in)
- Curb weight: 1,619 kg (3,569 lb); 1,659 kg (3,657 lb) (roadster); 1,549 kg (3,415 lb) (Black Series)

Chronology
- Predecessor: Mercedes-Benz 300 SL (spiritual)

The Mercedes-Benz SLS AMG (C197 / R197) is a front mid-engine, 2-seater, limited production sports car developed by the Mercedes-AMG division of German automotive manufacturer Mercedes-Benz, with the assistance of Scottish Formula One driver David Coulthard. SLS stands for "Super Leicht Sport" (Super Light Sport).

The SLS was the first Mercedes-Benz automobile designed and built from scratch entirely by AMG. Upon its introduction at the 2009 Frankfurt Motor Show, the SLS AMG's 420 kW (563 hp) M159 engine was according to AMG "the world's most powerful naturally aspirated production series engine" ever produced.

An electric version of the car, the SLS AMG Electric Drive, was presented at the 2012 Paris Motor Show. Production ended in 2014 with the introduction of the SLS AMG GT Final Edition.

As compared to the SLR McLaren, the SLS is, per Mercedes-AMG head Tobias Moers, the faster car on the track, both in the hands of normal drivers as well as race car drivers. The Mercedes-McLaren SLR came in at 1,750 kg (3,858 lb). The SLS, however, has a curb weight of 1,619 kg (3,569 lb) when equipped with the standard wheels.

== Design ==
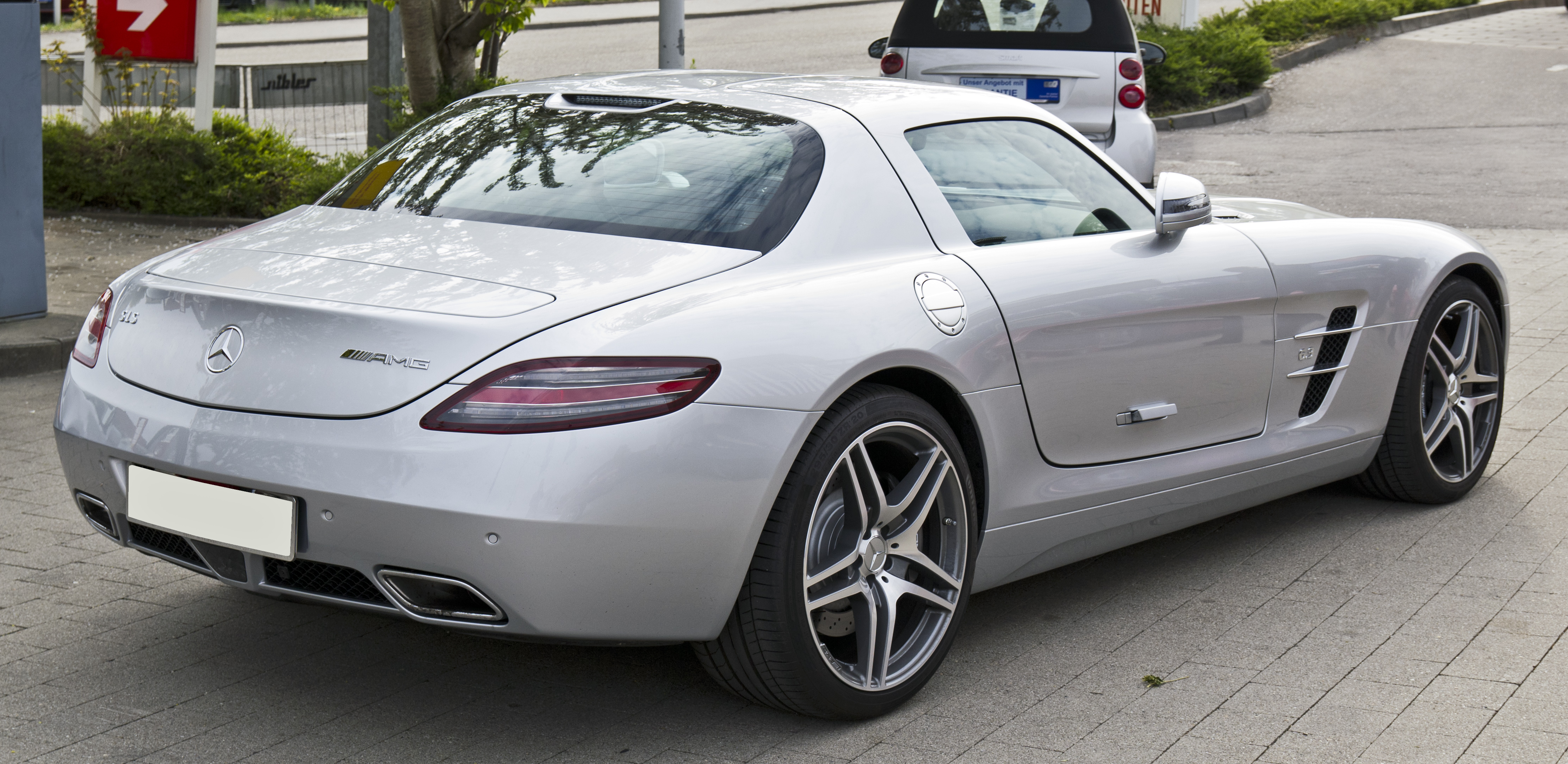
Mercedes-Benz SLS AMG Rear

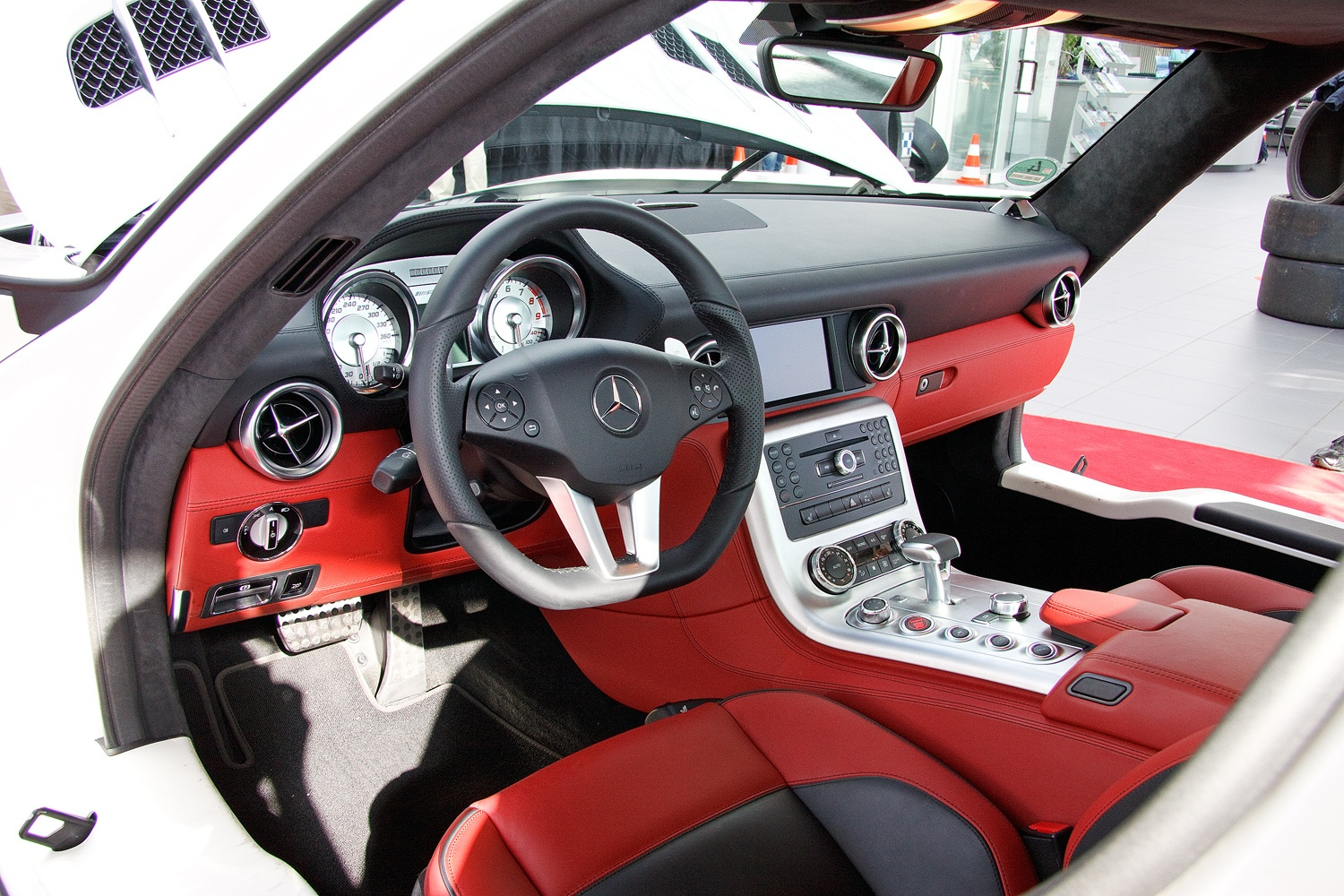
Interior

The SLS AMG was designed by Mark Fetherston from October 2006 to April 2007 to be a modern 300SL Gullwing revival. The SLS AMG has also adapted the feature of the gull-wing doors that swing open upwards on gas struts, and must be closed manually as AMG engineers decided against the 41 kg (90 lb) of additional weight that auto-closing systems would have added to the car. In case of a roll-over, the doors can be fully detached to allow the occupants to leave the vehicle.

Although there is some overlapping in price and performance, the lighter SLS AMG is considered more of a sporty track-oriented car, compared to the heavier and more luxurious Mercedes-Benz SL which is a grand tourer especially with its optional V12 engine. Compared to the SLS AMG Roadster, the SL is a hardtop convertible with technological and comfort amenities, and it also has available heated seats with a massage function.

The SLS AMG has won a number of design awards, including the 2010 red dot "best of the best" award, the iF product design award 2010 for the "Transportation Design" category, and the Auto Bild Design Award 2010 as "Europe's most attractive car". It is also the only automobile to have won the gold Design Award of the Federal Republic of Germany.

== Production and sales ==
=== Body styles (production years) ===
Model	Coupé	Roadster	Worldwide Production
SLS AMG	2010–2015	2011–2015	
SLS AMG GT	2012–2015	2012–2015	350
SLS AMG GT3	2011–2014	N/A	86
SLS AMG Coupé Black Series	2013–2015	N/A	132
SLS AMG Coupé Electric Drive	2013	N/A	9

The SLS AMG was assembled largely by hand, with its chassis and aluminum body shell produced by Magna Steyr in Graz, Austria and then transferred to Sindelfingen, Germany for assembly, with its engine being hand built by AMG in Affalterbach, Germany.

The SLS AMG was officially introduced at the 2009 Frankfurt Motor Show, and sales commenced in mid-2010 in Europe and in mid-2011 in the United States.

== Specifications ==
=== Engine ===
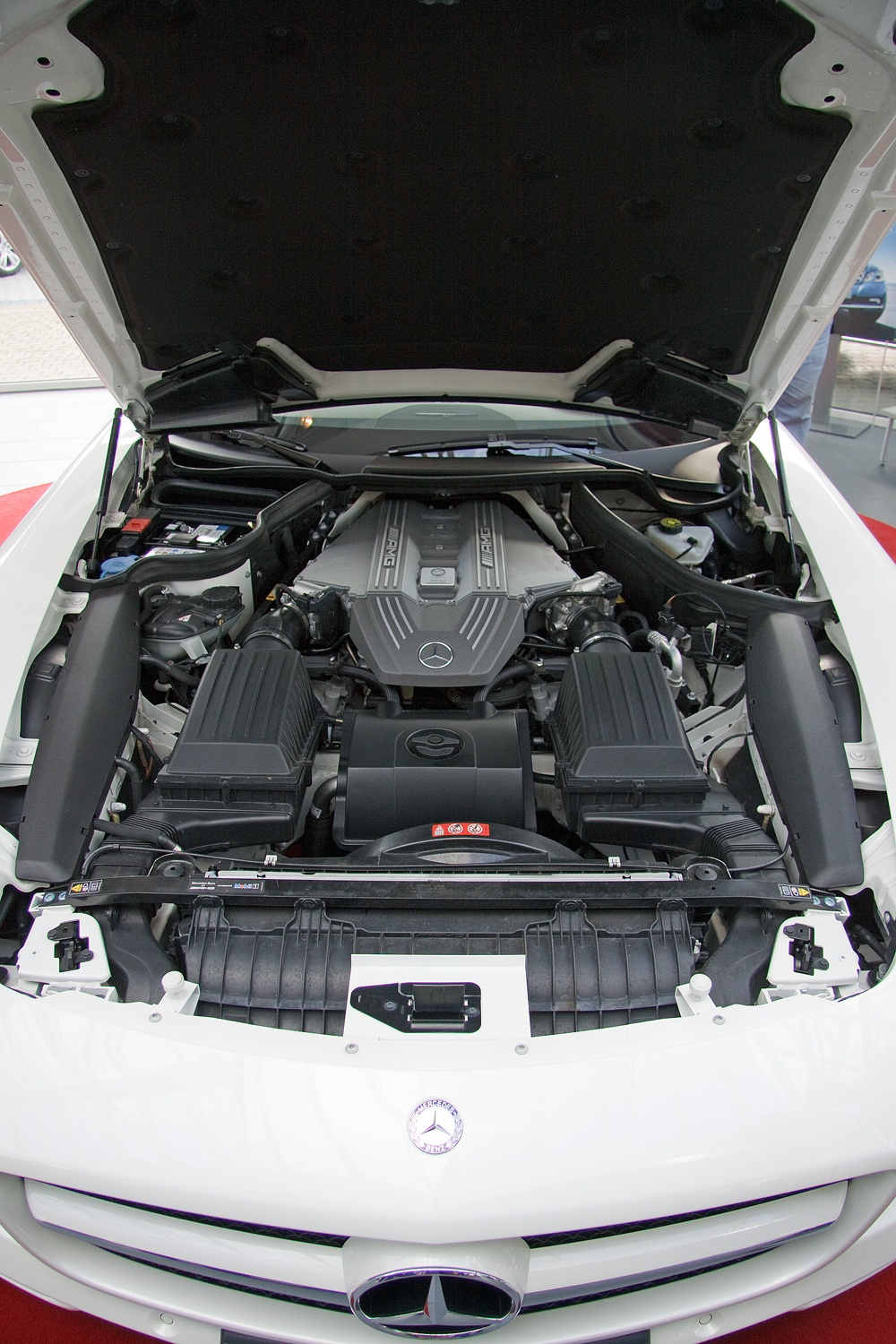
The 6.2-litre M159 V8 engine

Mercedes-Benz SLS AMG

Model	Years	Type/code	Power output	Torque
SLS AMG	2010–2015	6,208 cc (378.8 cu in) V8 (M 159 E 63)	420 kW; 563 hp (571 PS) at 6,800 rpm	650 N⋅m (479 lbf⋅ft) at 4,750 rpm
SLS AMG GT	2012–2015	6,208 cc (378.8 cu in) V8 (M 159 E 63)	435 kW; 583 hp (591 PS) at 6,800 rpm	650 N⋅m (479 lbf⋅ft) at 4,750 rpm
SLS AMG GT3	2011–2014	6,208 cc (378.8 cu in) V8 (M 159 E 63)	405 kW; 543 hp (551 PS) at 6,800 rpm	680 N⋅m (502 lbf⋅ft) at 4,750 rpm
SLS AMG Coupé Black Series	2013–2015	6,208 cc (378.8 cu in) V8 (M 159 E 63)	464 kW; 622 hp (631 PS) at 7,400 rpm	635 N⋅m (468 lbf⋅ft) at 5,500 rpm
SLS AMG Coupé Electric Drive	2013	4 synchronous electric motors	552 kW; 741 hp (751 PS)	1,000 N⋅m (738 lb⋅ft)
SLS AMG Coupé Electric Drive	2013	400 V 60 kWh (220 MJ) lithium-ion battery	600 kW; 805 hp (816 PS)	

The 6.2-litre V8 engine (based on the M156 block) was modified to such an extent that AMG gave it a separate engine code—M159—to signify the more than 120 different modifications done to the engine (as well as the addition of a dry-sump lubrication system to handle the car's high cornering speeds).

=== Transmission ===
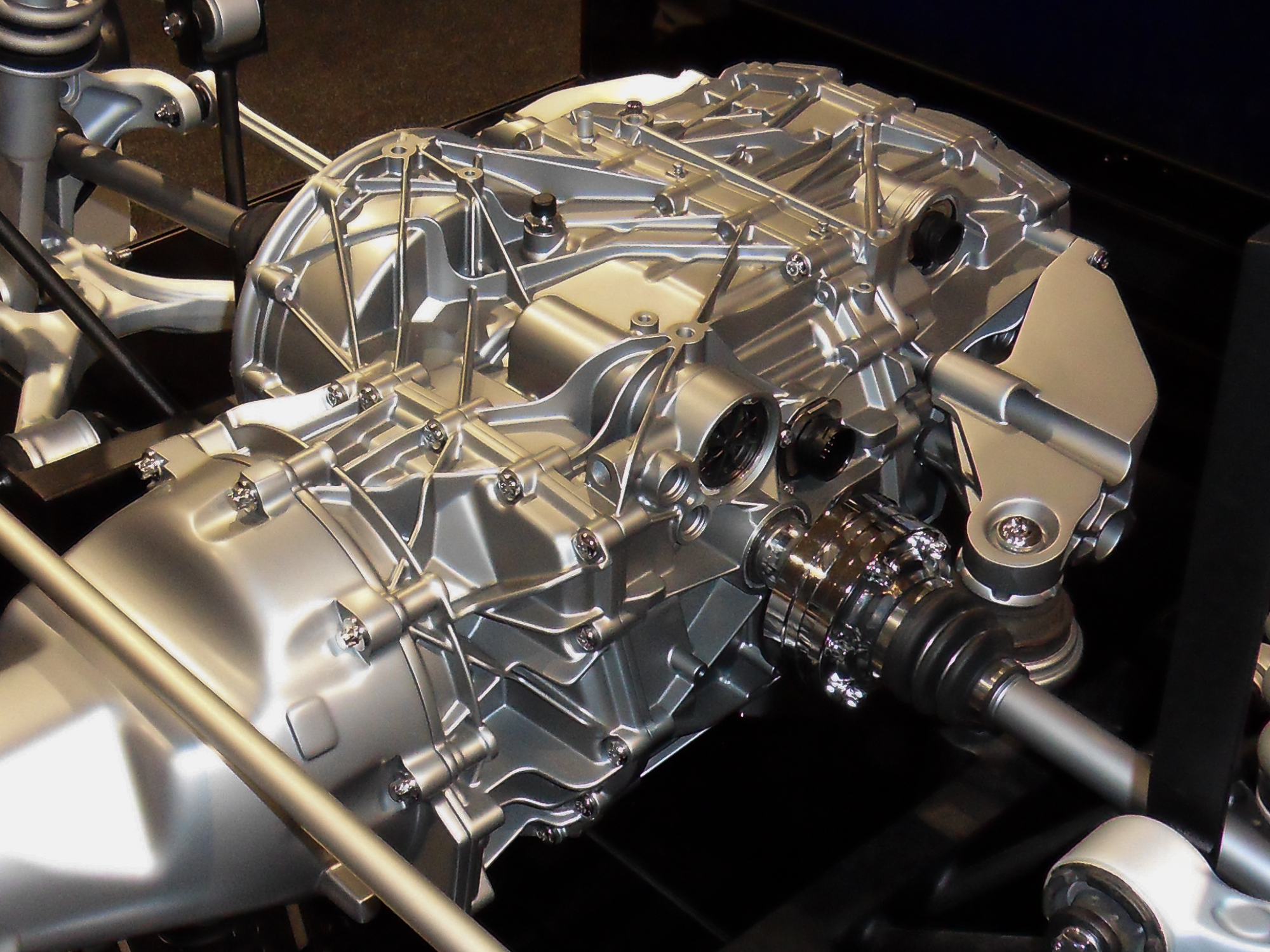
The 7-speed dual-clutch transmission used on the SLS AMG

The rear-mounted AMG SPEEDSHIFT DCT 7-speed dual-clutch automatic transaxle is connected to the engine through a lightweight carbon fibre driveshaft inside a torque tube. Selectable driving modes include "C" (Controlled Efficiency), "S" (Sport), "S+" (Sport plus) or "M" (Manual; allowing the driver to change gears via paddles present on the steering column behind the steering wheel). A true manual transmission is not available. All SLS AMG models except the SLS AMG Electric Drive use the DCT, with the Electric Drive using two single speed transmissions allowing individual distribution of torque to each wheel.

=== Suspension ===
The SLS AMG has double wishbone suspension with forged aluminium control arms and coilovers, front and rear. It is attached with aluminium brackets to the aluminium space frame, which in its entirety weighs 241 kg (531 lb). The steering rack is front-mounted. The rear uses toe links. The stabilizer bars and drop links are steel.

=== Brakes ===
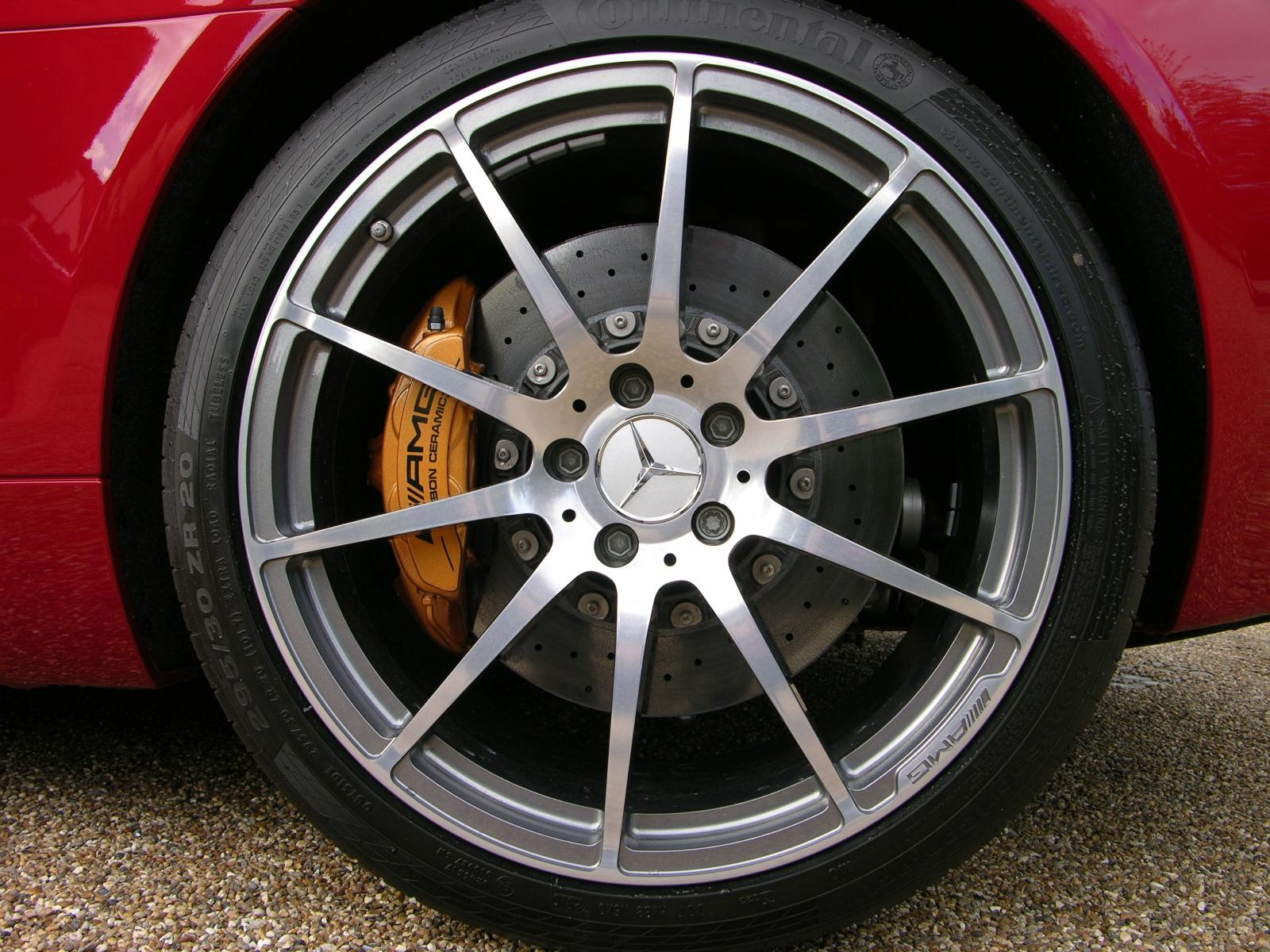
The carbon ceramic brakes were optional on the SLS AMG.

Standard are 390 mm (15.35 in) (front) and 360 mm (14.17 in) (rear) two-piece cast iron ventilated disc brakes with 6-piston aluminium (front) and 4-piston (rear) calipers. Optional on the SLS AMG are carbon-ceramic disc brakes. 402 mm (15.83 in) discs with 6-piston aluminium calipers (front) and 360 mm (14.17 in) discs with 4-piston calipers (rear). These brakes provide increased stopping power with a 40% weight reduction compared to the standard braking system. Front calipers have bridge bolts allowing pad changes without removing the calipers.

=== Fuel consumption ===
The fuel consumption of the SLS AMG is around 13 L/100 km (22 mpg_{‑imp}; 18 mpg_{‑US}) combined driving (NEDC, provisional figure).

=== Performance ===
The SLS AMG is capable of accelerating from 0 to 100 km/h (62 mph) in 3.8 seconds (manufacturer claimed), and can reach a top speed of 315 km/h (196 mph). It can also perform a quarter mile (400 m) time of 11.7 seconds at 201 km/h (125 mph). The SLS AMG achieves a lateral acceleration of 0.99, improving upon the Mercedes-Benz SLR McLaren, which achieves a 0.97 figure.

=== Safety ===
In the June 2010 issue of Car and Driver magazine, safety specifications were revealed pertaining to the safety of the SLS AMG's gullwing doors. Ten to fifteen milliseconds after a detected rollover, explosive bolts situated at the top of the door frame fire and bell cranks separate the doors from the car for easy exit during a serious accident. An anti-lock braking system and a 3-stage electronic stability program (ESP) are standard equipment.

=== Exterior ===
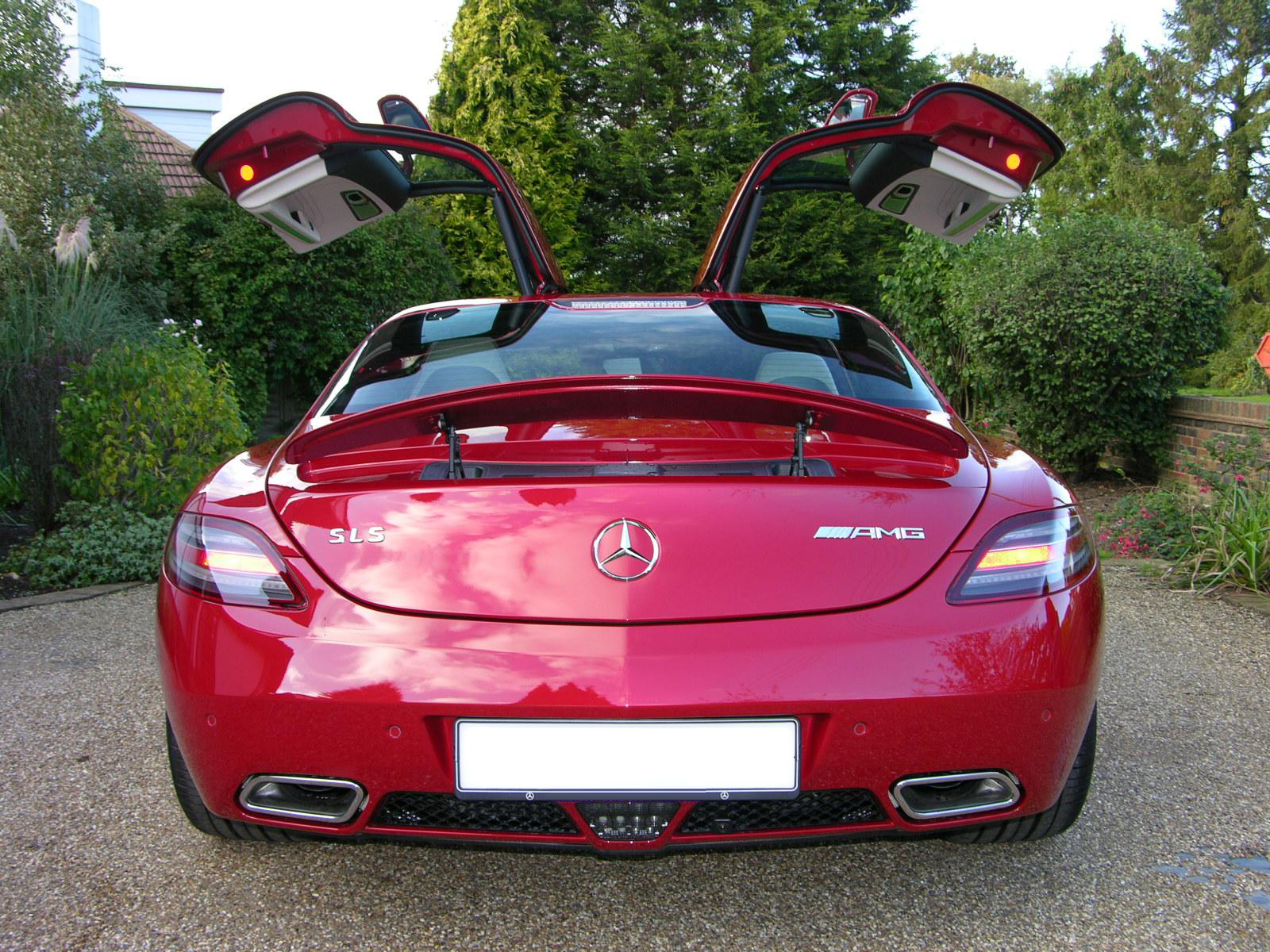
The retractable rear wing of the SLS AMG acts as an airbrake when braking.

The exterior aluminum body is supplied by Magna Steyr. The SLS and the CL65 AMG 40th Anniversary Edition are the only roadgoing Mercedes-Benz automobiles with the AMG Alubeam Silver exterior paint available, at an extra cost of €11,900 in Germany. Other colours include both metallic and matte colours, such as Designo Magno Kashmir, the matte paint known from the SL63 AMG IWC edition.

The SLS AMG has a retractable rear wing which extends at a speed of 120 km/h (75 mph) for stability and handling and acts as an airbrake when braking.

== Models ==
The first model introduced in the SLS lineup was the coupé with gullwing doors. In mid-2010, an FIA-GT3 racing version was introduced; and for 2011–2013, Mercedes introduced a roadster version (with conventional doors and a soft top), an electric E-Cell version (coupé), and the ultimate iteration named the Black Series, which has a reduced weight of 70 kg (154 lb).

=== SLS AMG Coupé (2009) ===
The SLS AMG includes 9.5x19-inch (front) and 11x20-inch (rear) AMG 7-spoke light-alloy wheels with 5-twin-spoke wheels and 10-spoke forged wheels available as an option, 265/35 R 19 front and 295/30 R 20 rear tyres, a tyre pressure monitoring system, Formula-1-style LED fog lamp/reversing light, black diffuser insert, dual exhaust tips with chrome finish, an electronically retractable rear wing automatically deployed at a speed of 120 km/h (75 mph), choice of 9 exterior colours including the AMG ALU-BEAM silver (an approximately US$12,750 option applied at a specialized location in 7 layers by hand after the surface of the car first receives additional polishing and finishing, with each flake of paint aligned to create a gleaming sheen of bluish silver that has the appearance of molten silver, a labour-intensive process that restricted Mercedes to only 2–3 cars finished in that colour per week), designo magno allanite grey (matte), AMG magno sylvanite grey (matte) and Mars Red (metallic), an instrument cluster with LED upshift indicator and two white backlit dials, COMAND APS multimedia system with its 7-inch screen between the two centre air vents, AMG DRIVE UNIT facing the driver, E-SELECT shift lever, Nappa leather upholstery, solid metal and (optional) genuine carbon-fibre trim; choice of five leather colours for the interior upholstery (black, classic red, sand, porcelain and light brown), sports seat backrests made from magnesium, sports seats with two-zone seat cushions and four-way lumbar support and optional Memory package (three configurable individual settings), integrated head restraints and sporty transverse fluting upholstered in designo leather (in optional classic red, sand and porcelain), performance leather steering wheel in a three-spoke design with 365-millimetre rim, a 3.7-litre glove compartment with a spectacles section, a 176-litre luggage compartment, carbon-fibre driveshaft at the rear axle, AMG SPEEDSHIFT DCT 7-speed sports transmission, 3-stage ESP with acceleration skid control system, optional carbon ceramic brakes (an approximately US$12,500 option), and a 1,000 watt stereo system (an approximately US$6,500 option).

The initial introduction took place at the 2009 Frankfurt Motor Show, and later at the 2009 Tokyo Game Show, Auto China 2010, and the second terminal of the Haneda Airport. The production model went on sale in spring 2010. Commercial release of the German model began on 16 November 2009. Pre-orders of the Japanese model began on 14 April 2010 with sales beginning from 10 June 2010 and deliveries beginning on 28 September 2010. Various minor changes and variations ensued, as identified below, with a very small gain in power (though the torque remained identical) and in the case of the final edition in model year 2015, certain visual add-ons (a fixed spoiler and carbon-effect).

=== SLS AMG "AMG Desert Gold" (2010) ===
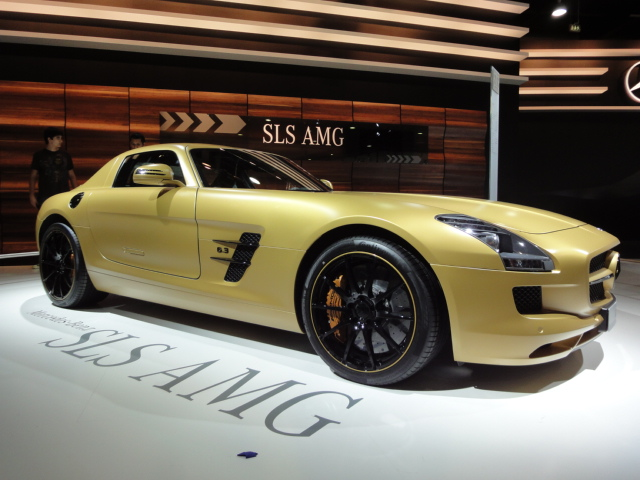
Mercedes-Benz SLS AMG "AMG Desert Gold"

Unveiled at the 2010 Dubai International Motor Show, this variant of the SLS AMG Coupé showcased further customisation options for the SLS AMG including decorative features in shining chrome or Silver Shadow colours, black-painted AMG light-alloy wheels in size 9.5 x 19 at the front and 11.0 x 20 at the rear with a golden ring on the rim flange and a matte gold body colour dubbed "desert gold".

=== SLS AMG "Blackbird" (2010) ===
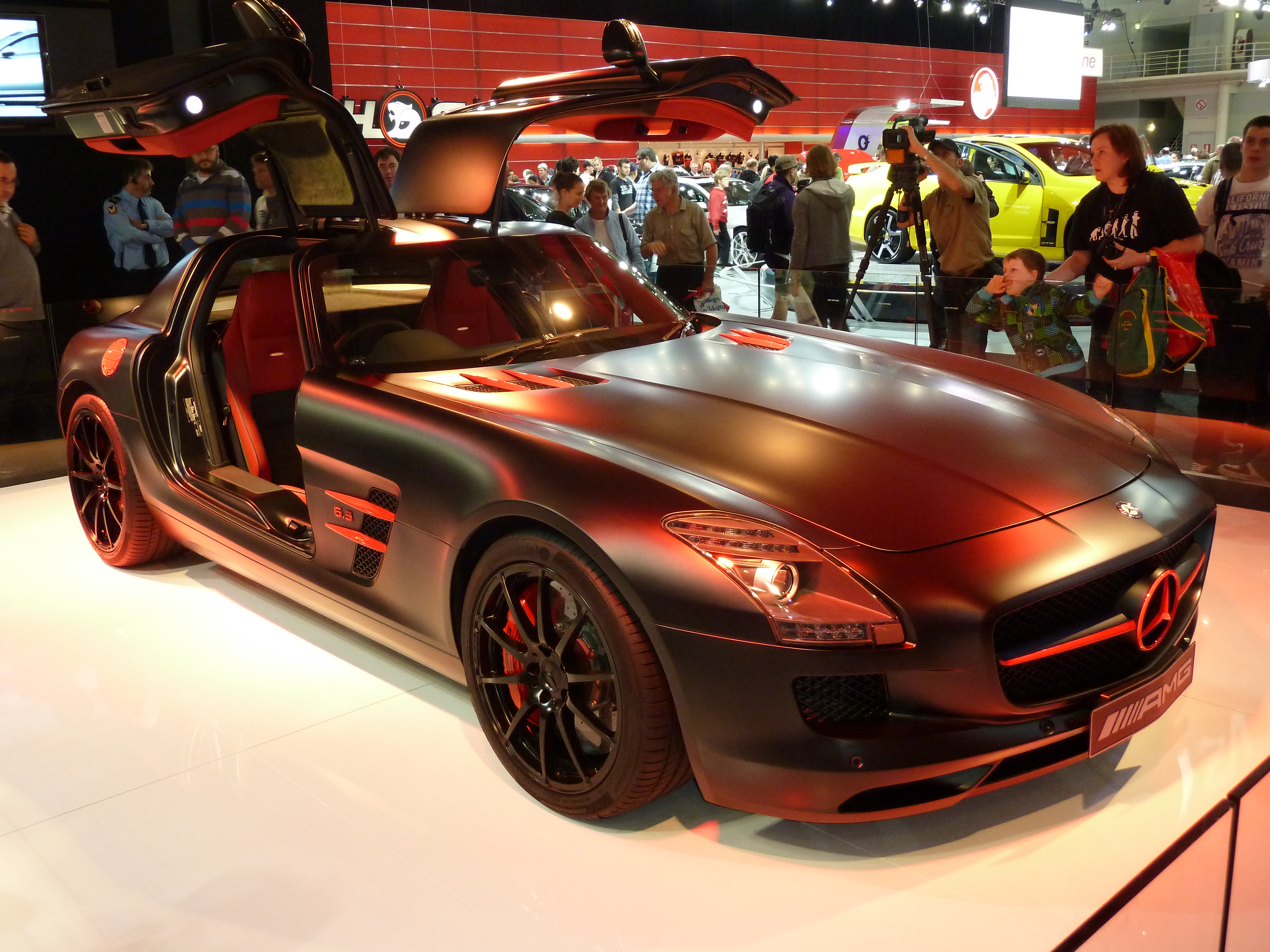

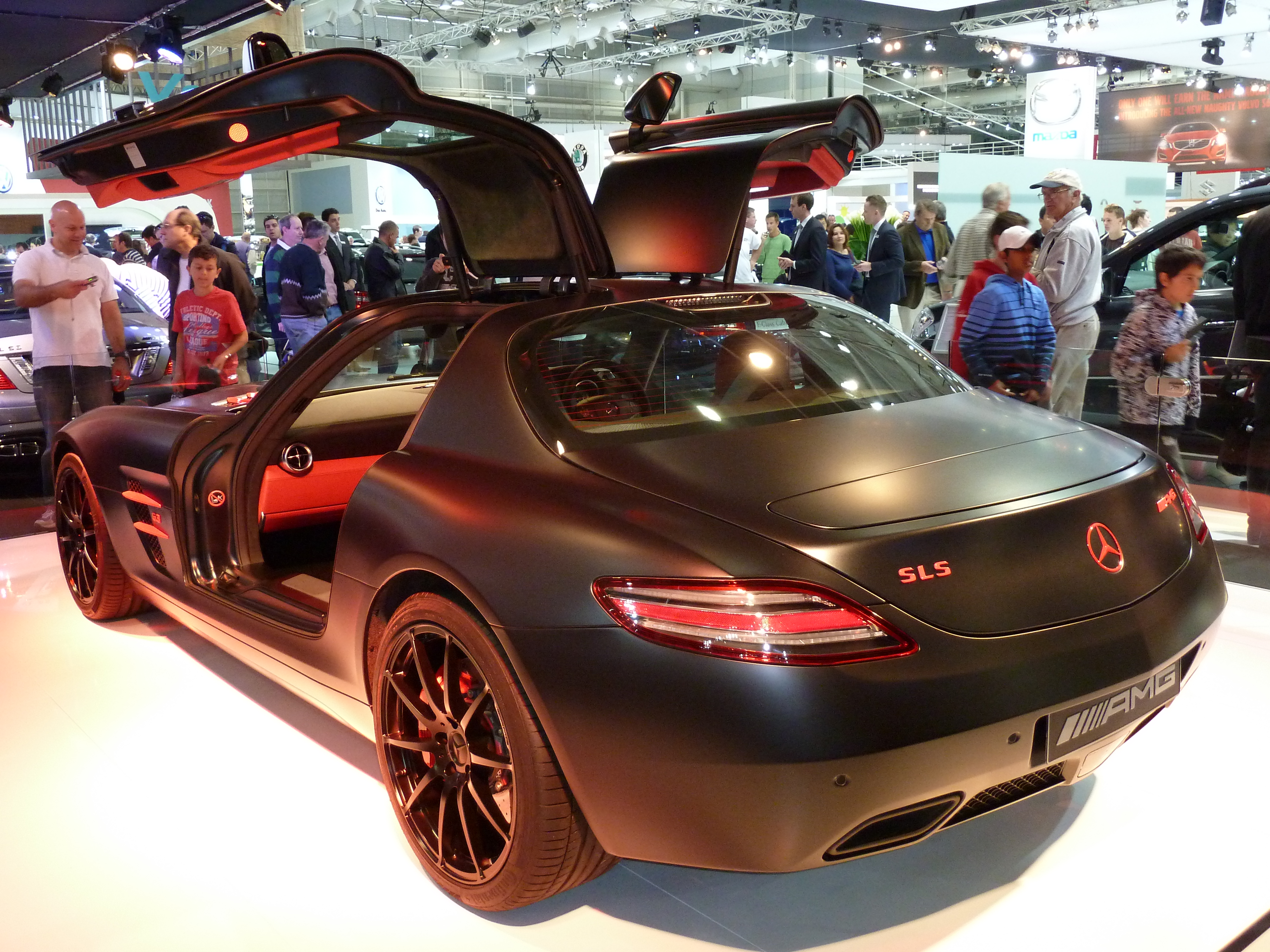
Mercedes SLS AMG Blackbird

Ordered by Mercedes-Benz's Australian subsidiary for the Australian International Motor Show, the Blackbird is a one-off variant of the 2010 Mercedes-Benz SLS AMG Coupé with designo magno Night Black body colour with red highlights.

=== SLS AMG E-CELL prototype (2011) ===
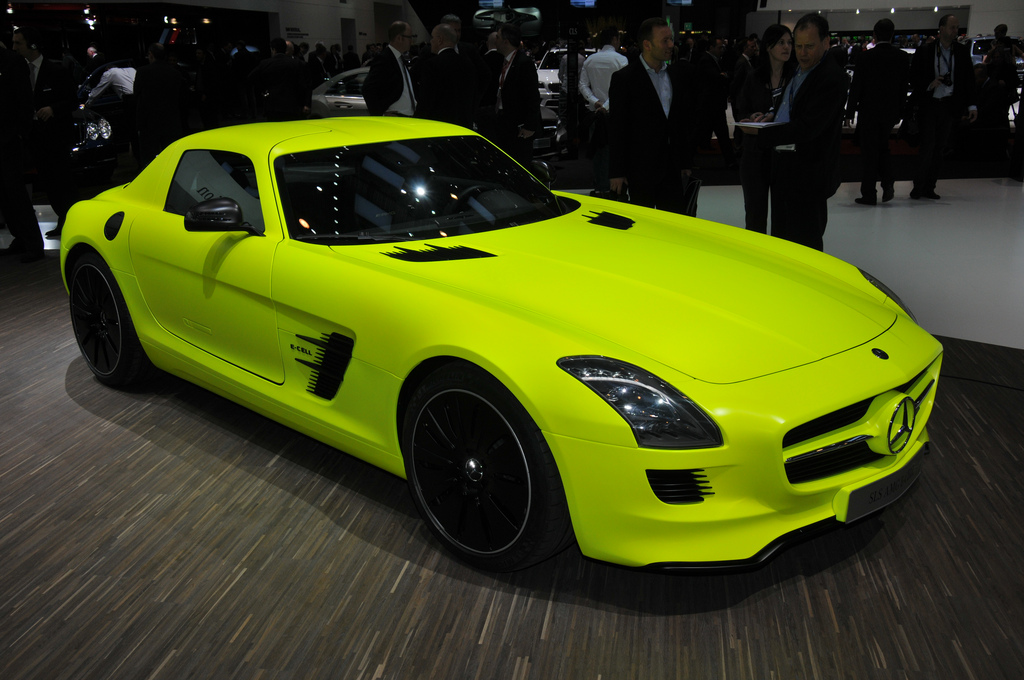

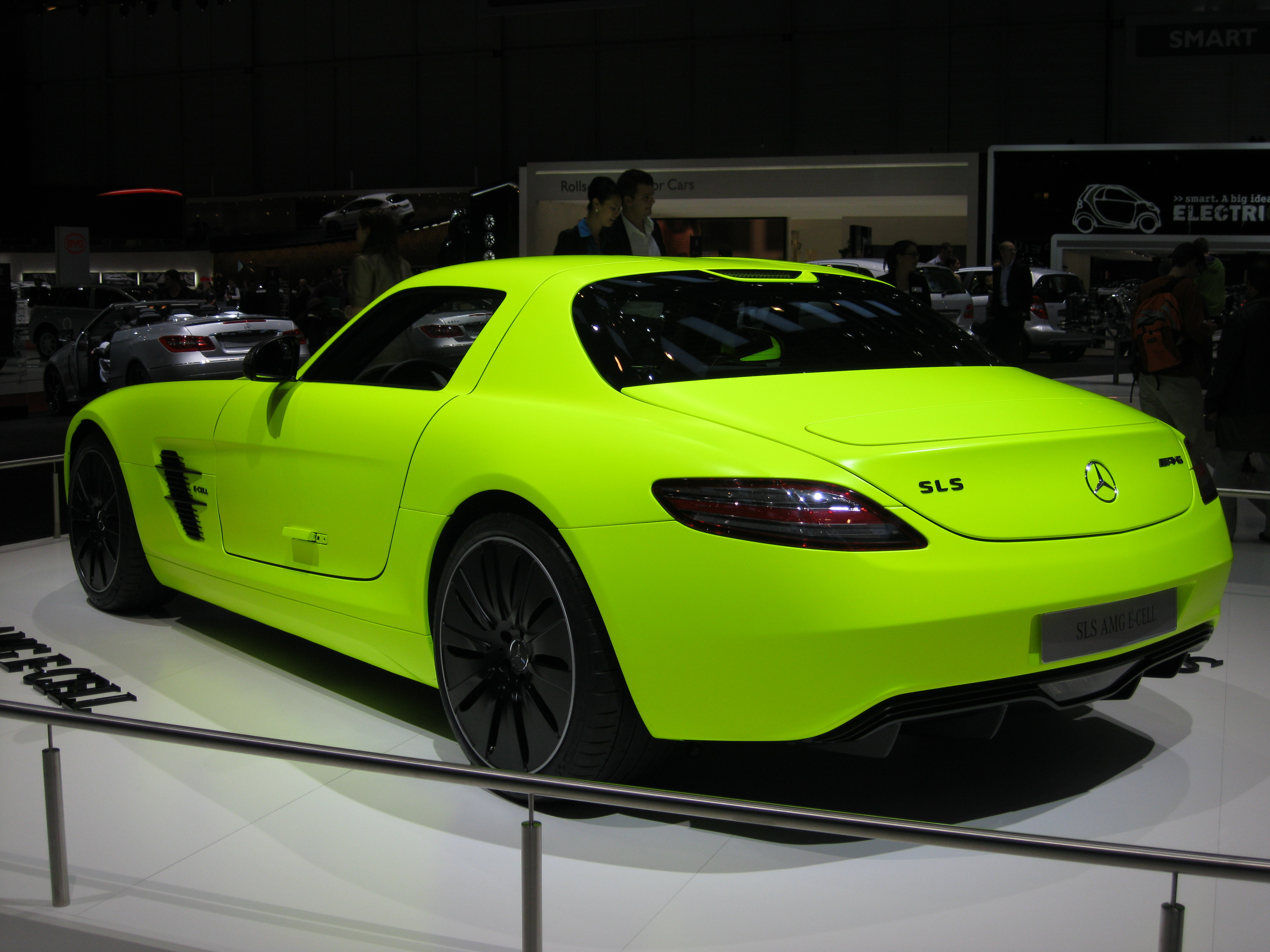
Mercedes SLS AMG E-Cell

Unveiled at the 2011 North American International Auto Show, the SLS AMG E-Cell is based on the SLS AMG Coupé, but is powered by four electric motors that provide a combined power output of 392 kW (533 PS; 526 hp) and 880 N⋅m (649 lb⋅ft). The battery is a 400 Volt lithium unit with a capacity of 48 kWh. Other features include pushrod damper struts, 402 mm × 39 mm (front) and 360 mm × 32 mm (rear) carbon ceramic brake discs. Full-LED headlamps, AMG 10-spoke light-alloy wheels with smooth-surfaced design, 265/35 R 19 (front) and 295/30 R 20 (rear) tyres, AMG Drive Unit angled towards the driver, sports seats made of quality Nappa leather in a black/white colour combination, performance leather/Alcantara steering wheel and the door linings, centre tunnel.

The battery was manufactured by Deutsche Accumotive GmbH & Co. KG, a joint venture between Daimler AG and Evonik Industries AG. The drivetrain has been in development since 2010 as a result of the cooperation between Mercedes-AMG and Mercedes AMG High Performance Powertrains in Brixworth.

=== SLS AMG GT3 (2011–2014) ===
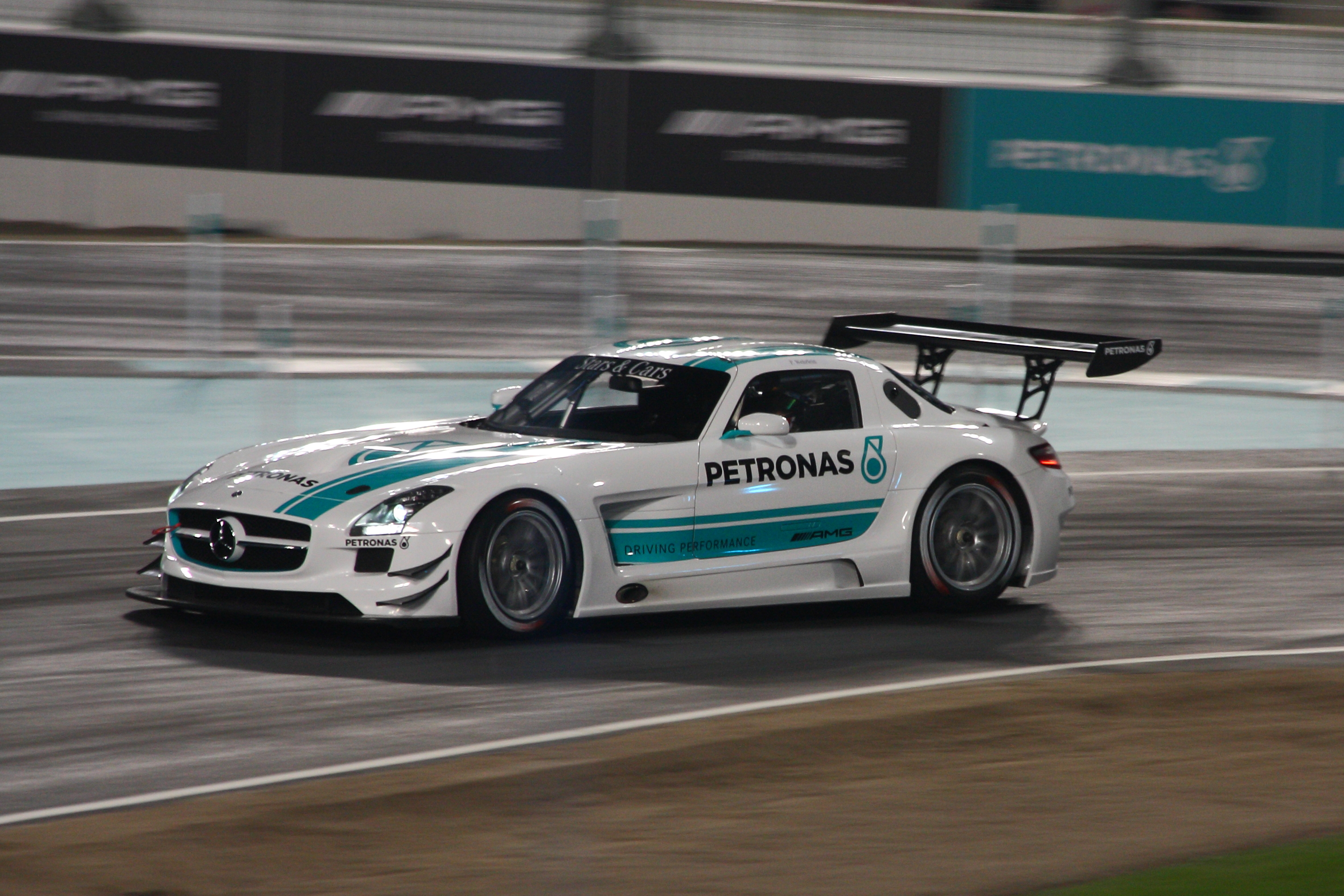
A Mercedes SLS AMG GT3 competing at the 2015 Stars And Cars event

The SLS AMG GT3 is a race version of the SLS AMG Coupé, developed in accordance with the GT3 regulations of the FIA (Fédération Internationale de l'Automobile). Notable changes include a sequential six-speed racing transmission with shift paddles mounted on the steering column, an integrated multi-disc locking differential and traction control, adjustment facilities for the springs and shock absorbers; the suspension height, the stabilisers, the track width and camber; a rack-and-pinion steering with a more direct ratio and servo assistance, AMG 18-inch light-alloy wheels, a steel racing braking system with racing ABS, seat shell (individually foam-padded, featuring the HANS (Head And Neck Support) system located in a high-strength carbon-fibre (CFRP) safety cell, a six-point racing harness, an optimised fire extinguisher system and the central display positioned within the driver's field of vision. The Development of the new Mercedes-Benz SLS AMG GT3 testing programme began on Lausitz Eurospeedway in June 2010.

Official introduction took place at the 2010 New York International Auto Show followed by Puebla in Mexico, and the 2010 Pebble Beach Concours d'Elegance. Deliveries began in February 2011, following homologation by the FIA in accordance with the GT3 regulations.

A total of 86 cars were sold.

=== SLS AMG Roadster (2011–2014) ===
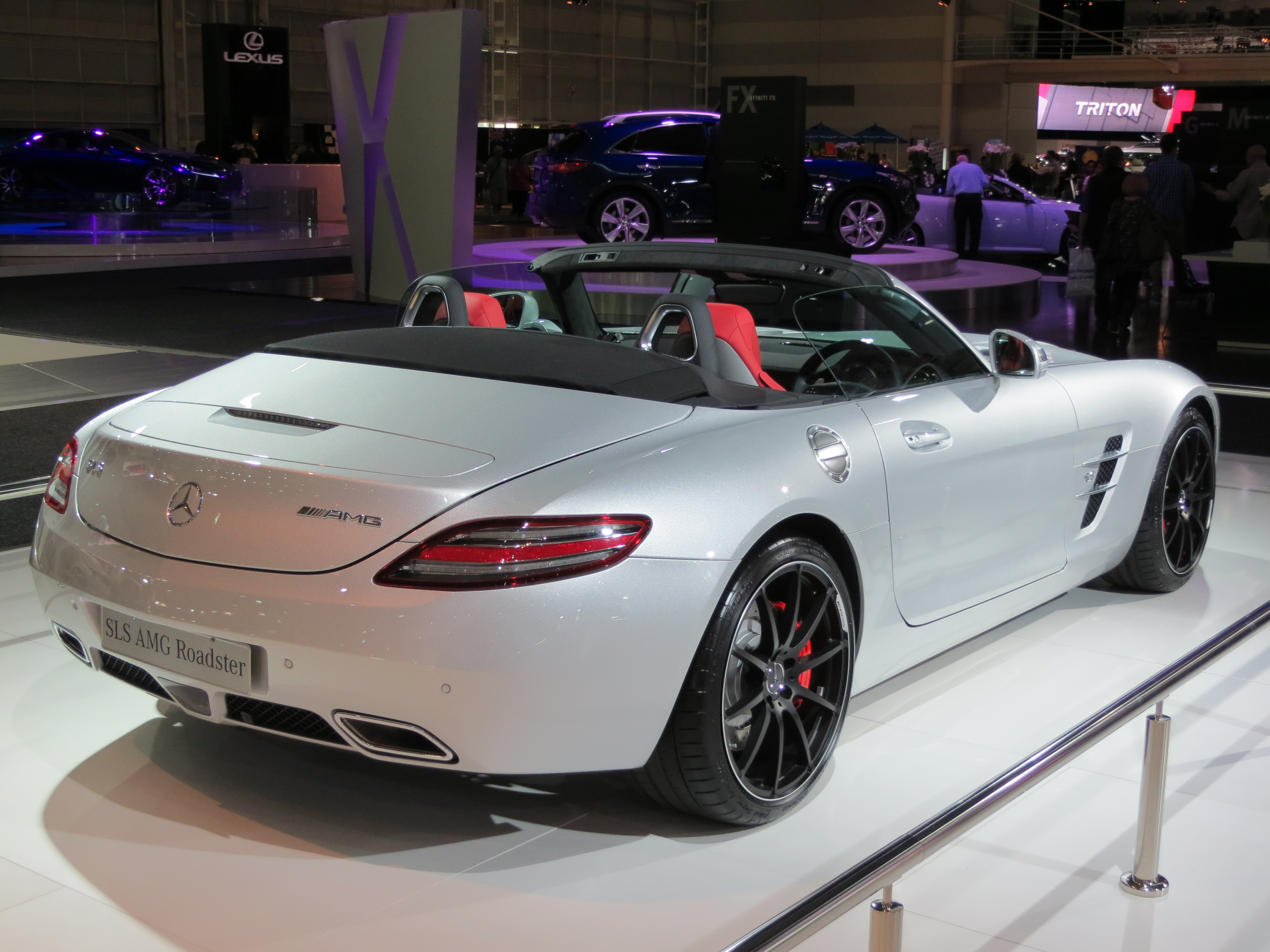
Mercedes-Benz SLS AMG roadster

The SLS AMG Roadster is a convertible variant of the SLS AMG Coupé, with conventional doors and three-layered fabric soft top (having a magnesium, steel and aluminium construction) which opens and closes in 11 seconds, and can be operated on the move at up to 50 km/h (31 mph). The roadster's DIN kerb weight is 40 kg (88 lb) more than the SLS AMG Coupé. Certain reinforcements were made to the roadster in order to compensate for the loss of roof which includes side skirts with greater wall thicknesses and more chambers, a dashboard cross-member is supported against the windscreen frame and centre tunnel by additional struts, a curved strut between the soft top and the tank reinforces the rear axle, a reinforcing cross-member behind the seats to support the fixed roll-over protection system. Other features include 265/35 ZR 19 front and 295/30 ZR 20 rear wheels, optional AMG Sepang brown body colour, optional weight-optimised forged wheels in a 10-spoke design in black with a high-sheen rim flange, optional AMG RIDE CONTROL sports suspension, 175 litres boot capacity, choice of 3 trims (leather, matte-finished solid metal, optional carbon-fibre), black designo leather upholstery, AMG sports seats with heating, a slot-in glass draught-stop, COMAND APS with DVD player, anti-theft alarm system with tow-away protection and interior monitoring, THERMOTRONIC luxury automatic climate control, KEYLESS-GO starting function, optional AIRSCARF ventilation at backrests of the AMG sports seats, leather-lined roll-over bars with integrated mesh in a "Silver Shadow" look with optional designo Exclusive leather, optional electrically folding exterior mirrors, optional Bang & Olufsen BeoSound AMG surround sound system, AMG Performance Media with high-speed mobile internet access (via Android operating system), optional Blind Spot Assist, optional AMG RIDE CONTROL sports suspension, 3-stage ESP with acceleration skid control, optional front AMG ceramic brake discs, AMG 7-spoke light-alloy wheels (optional 5-twin-spoke wheels, weight-optimised 10-spoke forged wheels), 265/35 R 19 front and 295/30 R 20 rear tyres, tyre pressure monitoring system.

The SLS AMG Roadster was unveiled at the 2011 Frankfurt International Motor Show.

Pre-orders began from 1 June 2011, with its market launch took place in Autumn 2011. The Japanese model went on sale on 21 September 2011.

=== SLS AMG Ambulance (2011) ===
The SLS AMG Ambulance concept showcases the sports car as an emergency vehicle. Unveiled at the 2011 RETTmobil emergency vehicle expo, the concept retained the amenities of the standard car. The car was finished in ALU-BEAM silver metallic exterior colour with decals and emergency lights. It wasn't, however, revealed whether the car was fitted with specialised equipment.

=== SLS AMG Matte Black Edition (2011–2013) ===
It is a limited version of the SLS AMG Coupé for the Japanese market, commemorating the first year of Mercedes-Benz SLS AMG. It included designo magno Night Black body colour with red highlights at 3-pointed star, grille fin, bonnet fin, SLS/AMG rear emblems, fuel lid (from the Blackbird car); matte black exhaust tip, high gloss black interior trim, leather upholstery in classic red/black, AMG RIDE CONTROL sports suspension, AMG red brake calliper, 19-inch front and 20-inch rear AMG 10-spoke alloy wheels in matte black, AMG performance steering wheel in leather/Alcantara.

The vehicle went on sale in September.

=== SLS AMG Matte Edition (2012) ===
The SLS AMG Roadster Matte Black Edition is a limited (5 units) version of the left-drive SLS AMG Roadster for the Japanese market. Main highlights include designo magno Night Black body colour, classic red/black interior, black soft top, high gloss black interior trim, red paint metal parts (3-pointed star, grille fin, bonnet fin, fender fin, AMG rear/6.3 emblems, fuel lid), matte black exhaust tip, 19-inch front and 20-inch rear AMG 10-spoke alloy wheels in matte black with red rim, 2-tone leather upholstery, AMG performance steering wheel in leather/Alcantara, Performance Studio floor mat and the AMG RIDE CONTROL sports suspension.

The SLS AMG Coupé Matte White Edition and SLS AMG Roadster Matte White Edition are limited (10 Coupé, 5 Roadster) versions of the left-drive SLS AMG Coupé and SLS AMG Roadster respectively, for the Japanese market. It included designo magno Cashmere White body colour, porcelain/black interior, black soft top (Roadster only), high gloss black interior trim, matte black paint metal parts (3-pointed star, grille fin, bonnet fin, fender fin, AMG rear/6.3 emblems, fuel lid, door mirror cover), matte black exhaust tip, 19-inch front and 20-inch rear AMG 10-spoke alloy wheels in matte black in matte black, 2-tone leather upholstery, AMG performance steering wheel in leather/Alcantara, Performance Studio floor mat, AMG RIDE CONTROL sports suspension.

The models went on sale in May 2012, while deliveries of SLS AMG Roadster Matte Black Edition, SLS AMG Coupé Matte White Edition, SLS AMG Roadster Matte White Edition began in September 2012, October 2012 and October 2012 respectively.

=== SLS AMG GT (2012–2013) ===
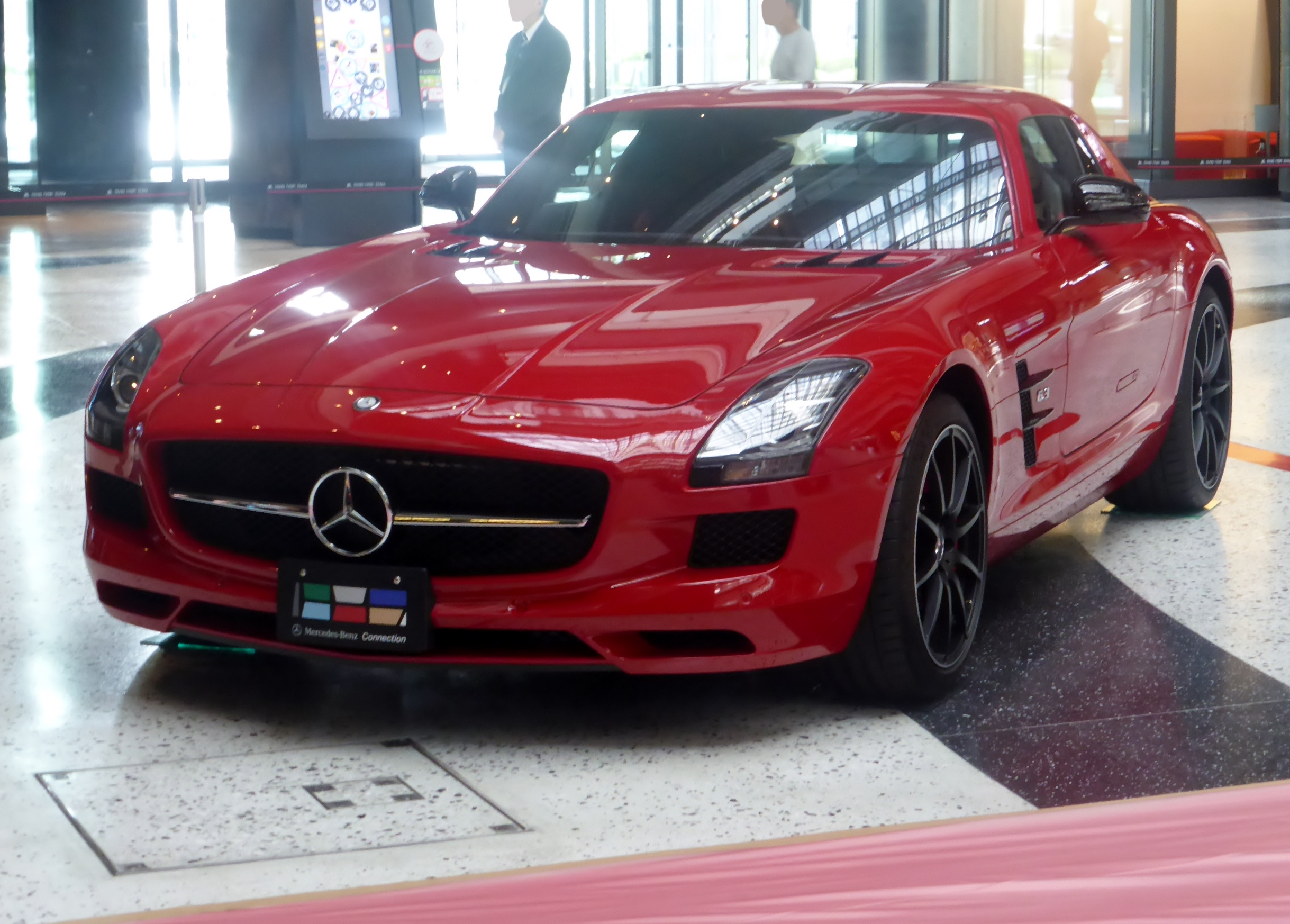

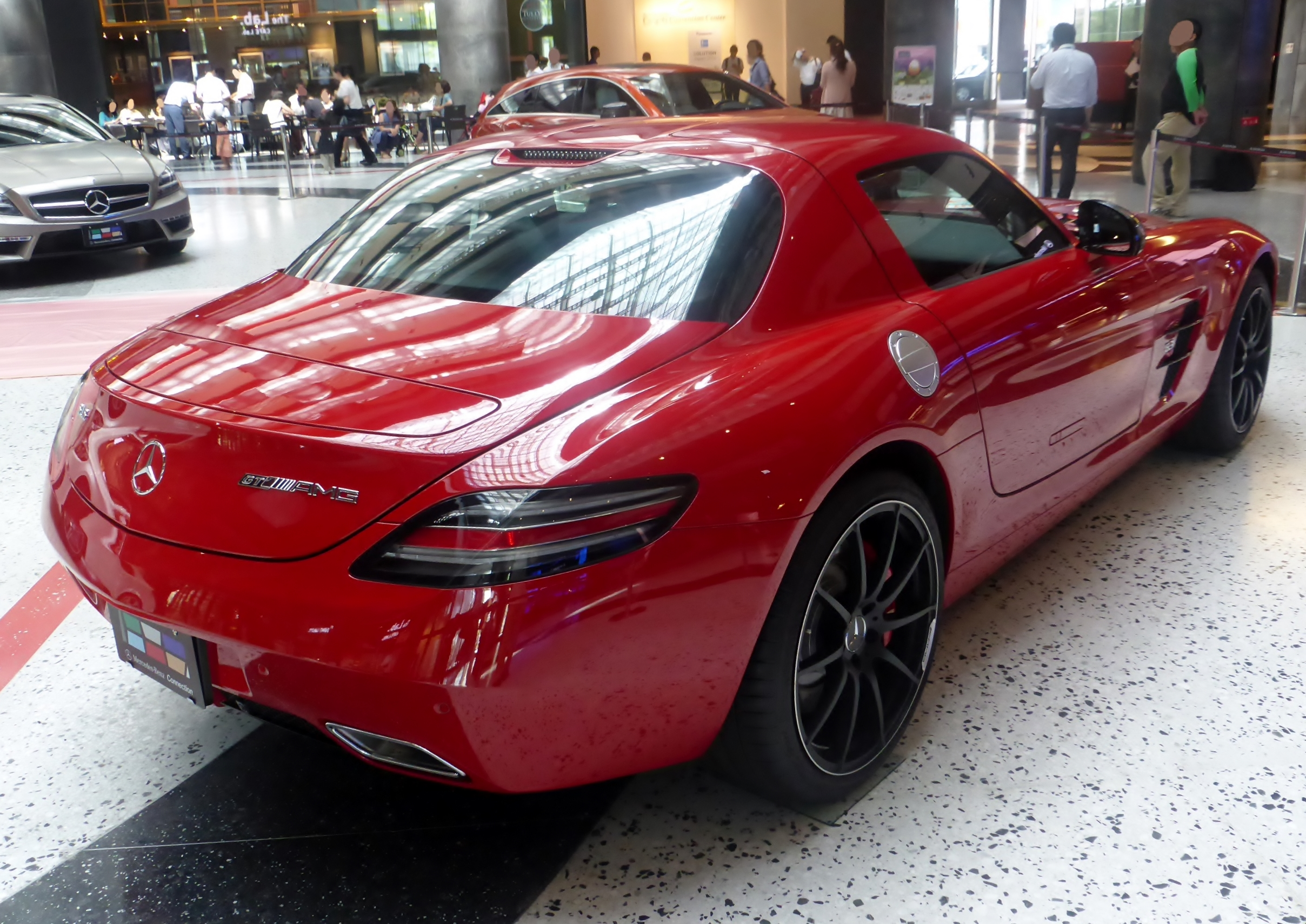
Mercedes SLS AMG GT

Available in Coupé and Roadster body styles, the SLS AMG GT has the same torque (649 N⋅m (479 lb⋅ft) at 4,750 rpm) and the same top speed as the regular SLS AMG but includes increased engine power output to 435 kW; 583 hp (591 PS) at 6,800 rpm and 650 N⋅m (479 lbf⋅ft) of torque at 4,750 rpm, resulting in a slight 1/10 of a second decrease in 0–97 km/h (0–60 mph) acceleration time (3.5 seconds to 3.4 seconds) over the prior year model, a reduced transmission reaction time in the manual "M" transmission mode, AMG RIDE CONTROL Performance suspension, selection of suspension modes via AMG DRIVE UNIT, 3 additional AMG light-alloy wheels options, Alcantara black interior upholstery, red seat belts, contrasting stitching on the AMG sports seats and the centre console and the door panel lining in red, floor mats in red edging, high-gloss black AMG trim on the centre console and door panel, high-gloss black edging on the adjustable cross-shaped air vents and the high-gloss real metal insert on the AMG Performance steering wheel with Alcantara grip, AMG instrument cluster with black faceplate, AMG designo Exclusive Style leather option (a diamond design with contrasting stitching, designo leather finish for the entire dashboard, the beltlines and door armrests, the handrest on the centre console, AMG floor mats in black with porcelain leather edging, roof lining in Alcantara porcelain, and the parcel shelf (Coupé) or roll-over bar (Roadster)) in 3 colour combinations (mocha brown/porcelain, titanium grey pearl/porcelain, mystic red/porcelain). Other options include AMG carbon-fibre exterior mirrors, AMG carbon-fibre engine compartment cover, AMG Interior Carbon-Fibre package (carbon-fibre trim, trim on seat backrest and side, door sill panels), AMG ceramic high-performance composite braking system, AMG Performance Media, AMG 10-spoke forged wheels in various colours, AMG carbon-fibre exterior package, AIRSCARF (Roadster) and Bang & Olufsen BeoSound AMG surround sound system.

The SLS AMG GT completed a lap around the Nürburgring Nordschleife in under 7 minutes 30 seconds.

The market launch began in October 2012. US models went on sale in mid- November 2012 as 2013 model year vehicles, replacing previous SLS AMG versions. Japanese models went on sale on 30 November 2012, with deliveries starting in March 2013.

=== SLS AMG GT Final Edition (2014) ===
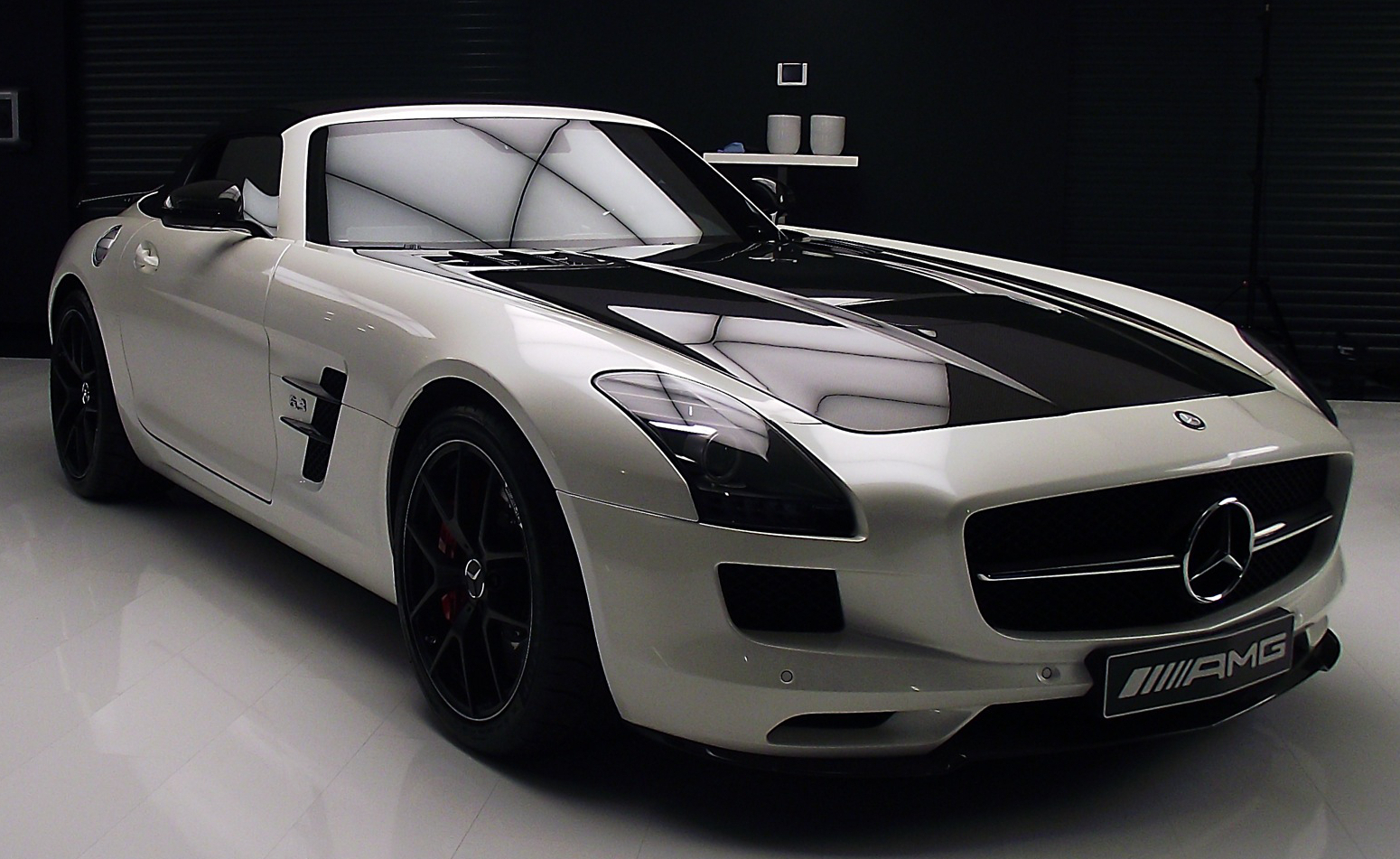
Mercedes-Benz SLS AMG GT Final Edition Roadster

Available in both Coupé and Roadster body styles, the SLS AMG GT final edition is the final limited production iteration (350 units total, 25 in Japan) of the SLS AMG GT. Features includes an exposed carbon fibre hood with central air outlet, carbon fibre front splitter on the front apron, fixed carbon fiber rear spoiler from the SLS AMG Coupé Black Series, the choice of 2 exclusive AMG forged light-alloy wheels (inlaid in matte black with the spokes and rim flange in a high-sheen finish, completely painted matte black highlighted by a pencil thin high-sheen rim flange), designo magno graphite matte body colour (from the SLS AMG GT3 "45th ANNIVERSARY"), struts of the rear apron in high-gloss black, red-painted brake callipers, 265/35 R 19 (front) and 295/30 R 20 (rear) Dunlop Sport Maxx Race Cup tires as a no-cost option, designo Exclusive leather upholstery in a diamond-stitch pattern at centre panels of both the seats and the doors, contrasting topstitching in silver with black leather upholstery, silver seat belts, black floor mats edged in silver leather, high gloss carbon fiber trim, "AMG FINAL EDITION – 1 of 350" badge on the carbon fibre centre console, 3D seam (a fine strip of Alcantara) set into the leather-covered upper dashboard, contrasting topstitching in silver at 3D seam, AMG Performance steering wheel in Alcantara with a silver 12 o'clock marking and black metal inserts, high-gloss black surrounds of the air vents, sports seats with an embossed AMG crest in the head restraints.

The "Final Edition" changes do not result in any quantifiable performance difference over the prior year model. Horsepower, torque, acceleration times and top speed are all identical.

Other options include Carbon Fibre wing mirrors, Extended Interior Carbon Fibre package (additional carbon-fiber trim on seat backrest and side, as well as door sill panels), AMG Carbon-Ceramic High-Performance braking system, AMG Performance Media and Bang & Olufsen BeoSound AMG surround sound system.

The car was unveiled first at the 2013 Los Angeles Auto Show and the 2013 Tokyo Motor Show, followed by the 2013 Osaka Motor Show.

Market launch was set to begin in March 2014.

The Japan model was set to be delivered in June 2014, which included 20 Coupés, 5 Roadsters, the choice of 6 body colours (Fire Opal solid, Obsidian Black metallic, Elysium Silver metallic, AMG Imola Grey (premium), designo Magno Graphite (matte) (premium), designo Mystic White 2 (premium)), black designo Nappa full leather interior upholstery with silver diamond pattern stitching at door centre panel, seat centre; anthracite roof liner, choice of 3 soft top colours for Roadster (black, beige, red), carbon fibre wing mirrors, Bang & Olufsen BeoSound AMG sound system and optional AMG Carbon-Ceramic brake discs.

=== SLS AMG GT3 "45th ANNIVERSARY" (2012) ===
Unveiled at the 2012 São Paulo International Motor Show, the SLS AMG GT3 "45th ANNIVERSARY" is a limited (5 units) version of the SLS AMG GT3 commemorating the 45th anniversary of the AMG brand. Main highlights included designo magno graphite matte body colour, a seat shell in a high-strength carbon-fibre safety cell on the co-driver's side, carbon fibre reinforced plastic doors, bonnet, mudguards, boot lid, rear wings, front and rear apron, front splitter and rear diffuser.

The engines for the SLS AMG GT3 "45th ANNIVERSARY" were installed by Bernd Schneider.

=== SLS AMG Black Series (2013–2015) ===
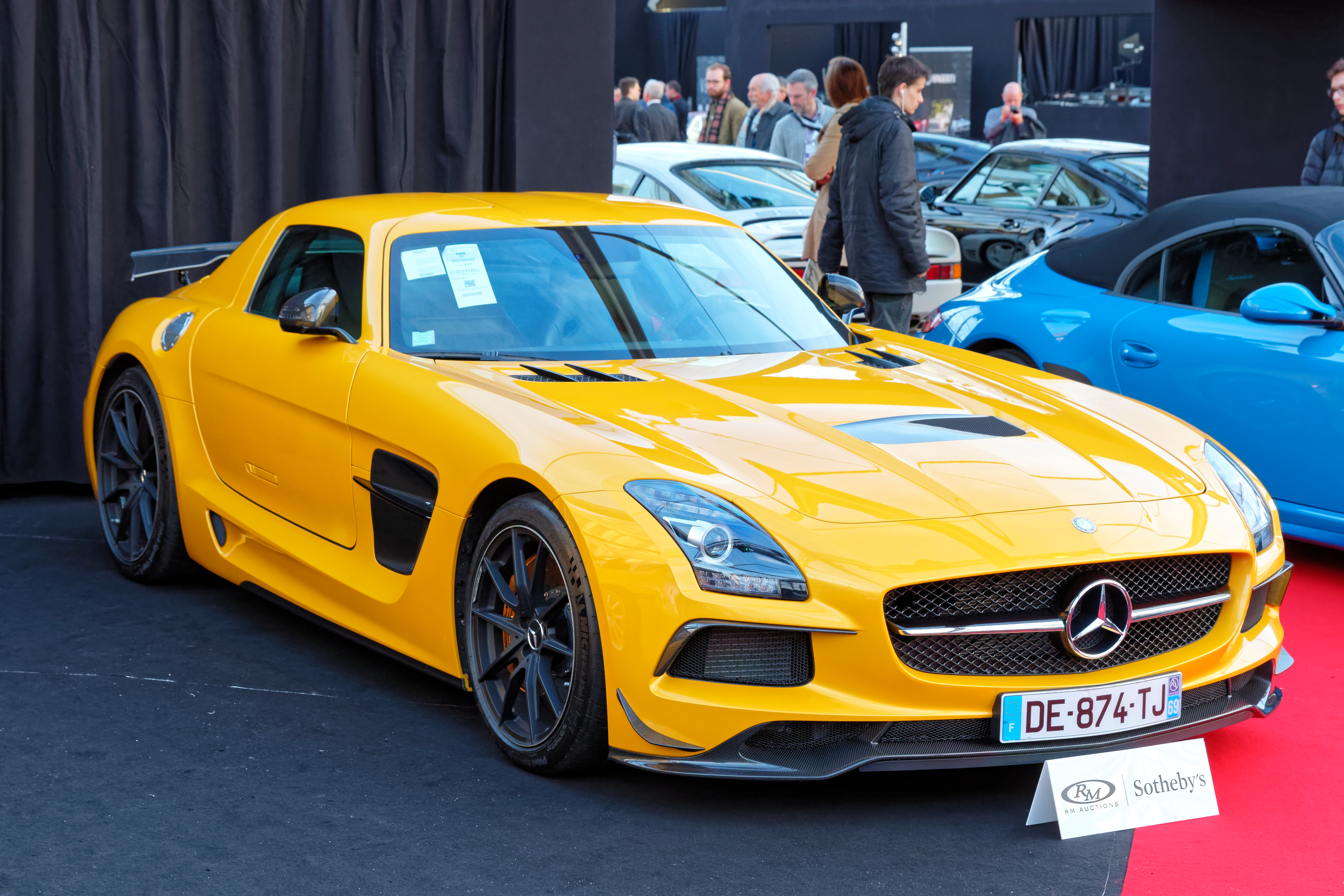

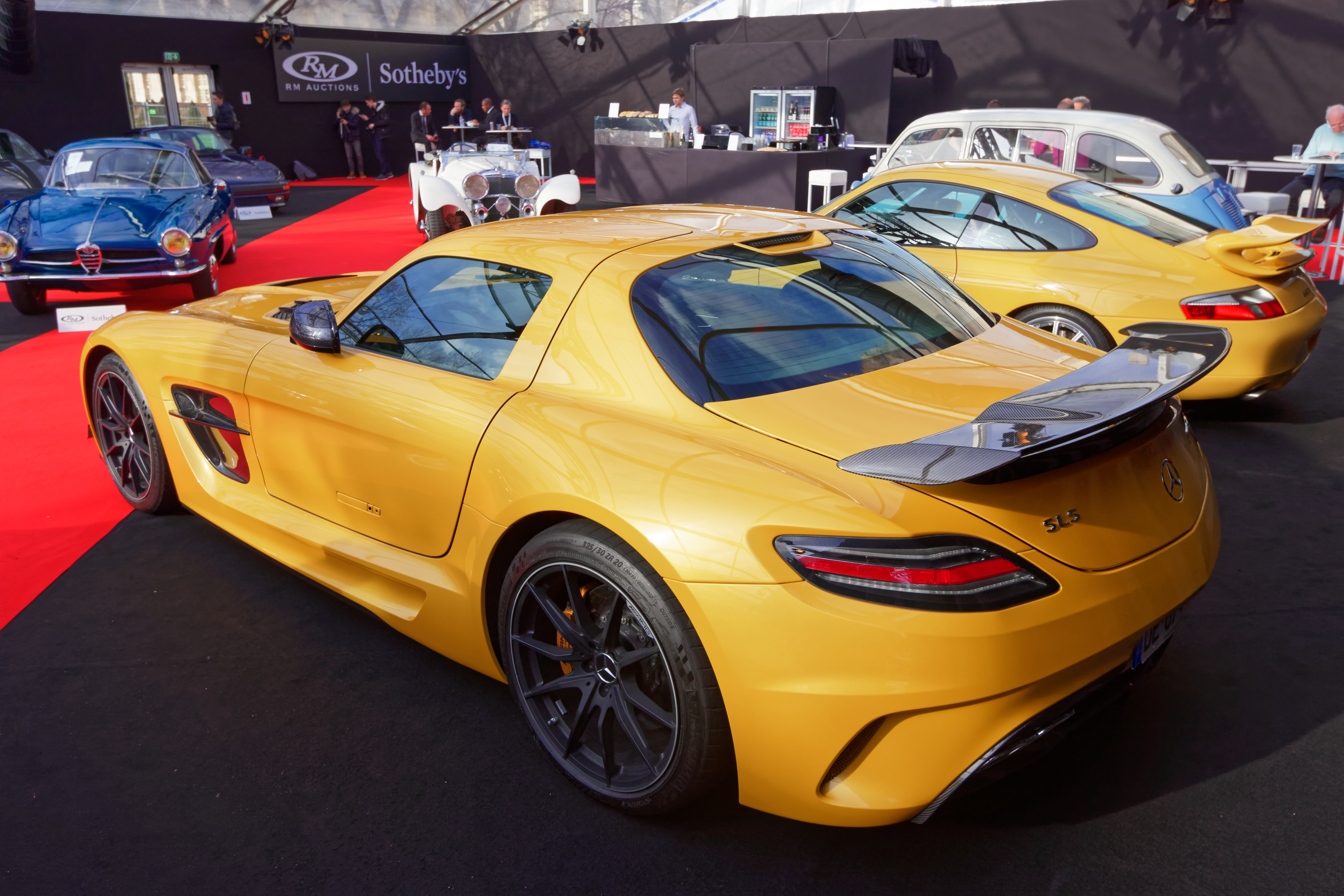
Mercedes-Benz SLS AMG Black Series in Solarbeam Yellow

Unveiled at the 2012 LA Auto Show, with a market launch that began in June 2013. the SLS AMG Black Series is a high-performance variant of the SLS AMG Coupé inspired by the SLS AMG GT3. Notable changes over the SLS AMG include increased engine power to 464 kW; 622 hp (631 PS) at 7,400 rpm and decreased torque to 635 N⋅m (468 lb⋅ft) at 5,500 rpm along with increased engine redline of 8,000 rpm, fully revised high-speed valvetrain with modified camshafts, adapted cam geometry and optimised bucket tappets having a special coating which is otherwise exclusive to racing cars, modification of the intake air ducts (derestriction and adaptation to the new maximum engine speed), adaptation of the engine application and increase in peak pressure. This results in an acceleration time from 0–97 km/h (60 mph) in 3.2 seconds (Car and Driver test) (2/10 of a second faster than the SLS AMG GT), and a top speed of 315 km/h (196 mph). The Black Series engine was, at the time, the most powerful naturally aspirated V8 engine fitted into production cars, until the debut of the Chevrolet Corvette C8 Z06.

The Black Series is 70 kg (154 lb) lighter than the standard model. This is accomplished by increased use of carbon fibre in body panels, mechanical components, and the space frame. Further, a switch from steel to titanium for the exhaust system reduces weight by 13 kg (29 lb). The use of lithium-ion battery reduces weight by 8 kg (18 lb).

The AMG SpeedShift DCT 7-speed sports transmission is installed 10 mm (0.39 in) lower in order to achieve a lower centre of gravity for the car and is braced against the body by gas-filled struts in order to avoid stress cycles. The transmission's "Sport plus" and "Manual" modes have faster shifting speed than the standard model. The downshifting throttle blips are more audible. The new temporary "M" mode enables the driver to activate manual mode without having to remove a hand from the steering wheel, by pressing the "up" or "down" shift paddle once.

Other notable highlights include electronically controlled AMG rear-axle differential lock with a shorter rear-axle ratio, new AMG RIDE CONTROL performance suspension (tauter basic tuning and electronically controlled two-stage damping, coil-over spring retainers to enable adjustment of wheel loads, elastokinematics 50 / 42% more rigid (front/rear axle), track width increased by 20 / 24 mm (0.79 / 0.94 in) (front/rear axle)), new wheel carriers on front axle and new front stabiliser tuning, matte black with high-sheen AMG 10-spoke light-alloy wheels in particularly light forged design with optimised strength (10 in × 19 in (250 mm × 480 mm) front, 12 in × 20 in (300 mm × 510 mm) rear), Michelin Pilot Sport Cup 2 sports tyres (275/35 R 19 front, 325/30 R 20 rear), AMG speed-sensitive steering with newly calibrated power steering characteristics, AMG ceramic brake discs (measuring 402 mm × 39 mm (15.8 in × 1.5 in) at the front and 360 mm × 32 mm (14.2 in × 1.3 in) at the rear) with increased hardness, wide flared wings with an added width of 13 mm (0.51 in) (front) and 26 mm (1.0 in) (rear) on each side, darkened headlamps and black surrounds for the rear lights, front apron and rear apron with diffuser along with side sill panels in Black Series-specific design (carbon fibre-reinforced plastic front splitter, carbon inserts in the side sills and the rear apron made of carbon fibre, enlarged air intakes with carbon-fibre flics), carbon-fibre bonnet with central air outlet, Alcantara black or Alcantara black/red interior AMG Performance steering wheel with Alcantara upholstery, metal bezel features a high-gloss black paint finish to match the high-gloss black surrounds of the air vents, Alcantara strip in anthracite across the entire width of dashboard leather with red contrasting stitching in the leather, designo leather and Alcantara upholstery (including bottom section of the dashboard, door centre panels and on the AMG sports bucket seats in Alcantara), deleted COMAND APS multimedia system replaced by a carbon-fibre trim element (COMAND APS is optionally available), AMG DRIVE UNIT, red seat belts and red contrasting stitching on the AMG sports bucket seats, the upper and lower section of the dashboard and the door panelling; floor mats with red edging and optional Bang & Olufsen BeoSound AMG surround sound system.

Optional AMG Aerodynamics package includes a fixed adjustable carbon-fibre rear aerofoil as installed on the SLS AMG GT3, rear aerofoil braced by aluminium elements on a special insert on the boot lid, additional carbon-fibre flics on the front apron. New body colour choices include AMG solar beam yellow (total 7, including matte paint designo magno alanite grey).

Other options include AMG carbon-fibre wing mirrors, AMG carbon-fibre engine cover, AMG Interior Carbon-Fibre package, AMG infotainment system (incl. COMAND APS, AMG Performance Media and backup camera), Media Interface.

The US model went on sale in summer 2013 as 2014 model year vehicle.

=== SLS AMG Electric Drive (2013) ===
Mercedes-Benz SLS AMG Electric Drive
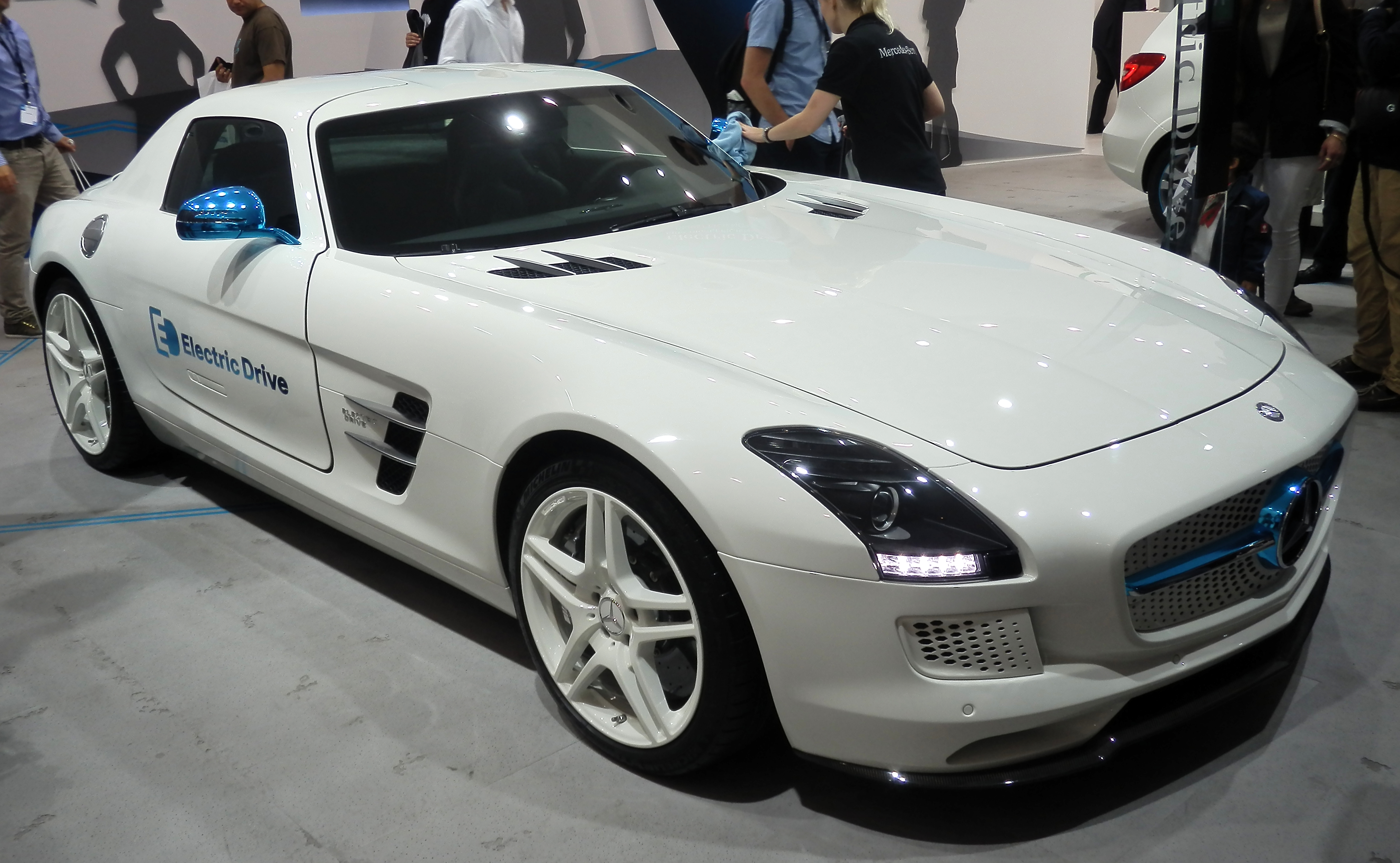

Overview
- Production: 2013; 9 produced

Powertrain
- Electric motor: 4 synchronous motors
- Power output: 552 kW (740 hp); 1,000 N⋅m (740 lb⋅ft)
- Battery: 60 kWh lithium ion
- Electric range: 250 km (160 mi) (NEDC)

The SLS AMG Electric Drive was a limited edition electric variant of the SLS AMG introduced in June 2013. The production version was unveiled at the 2012 Paris Motor Show, with market launch initially scheduled for June 2013. Pricing in Germany began at €416,500 (~ US$544,236). The production number has been officially confirmed: only nine SLS AMG Electric Drive were sold to the customers worldwide.

==== History ====
Following the introduction of the SLS AMG E-CELL prototype, the production of SLS AMG E-CELL was originally announced at the 2011 North American International Auto Show.

==== Powertrain ====
The SLS AMG Electric Drive was powered by four electric motors with combined ratings of 552 kW (751 PS; 740 hp) and 1,000 N⋅m (738 lb⋅ft). Each motor can spin up to 13,000 rpm and weighs 45 kg (99 lb). In addition, the transmission allows each motor to selectively drive all 4 wheels. This enables the car to accelerate from a stand still to 100 km/h (62 mph) in 3.9 seconds.

==== Battery ====
The SLS AMG Electric Drive included a liquid-cooled 400 V lithium-ion battery rated to 60 kWh that had a range of 250 km (160 mi) under the combined New European Driving Cycle. The 548 kg (1,208 lb) battery pack is made up of 12 modules, each comprising 72 lithium-ion cells. The system was designed as a collaboration between Mercedes-AMG and Mercedes AMG High Performance Powertrains Ltd.

== Motorsport ==
=== F1 Safety Car (2010–2014) ===
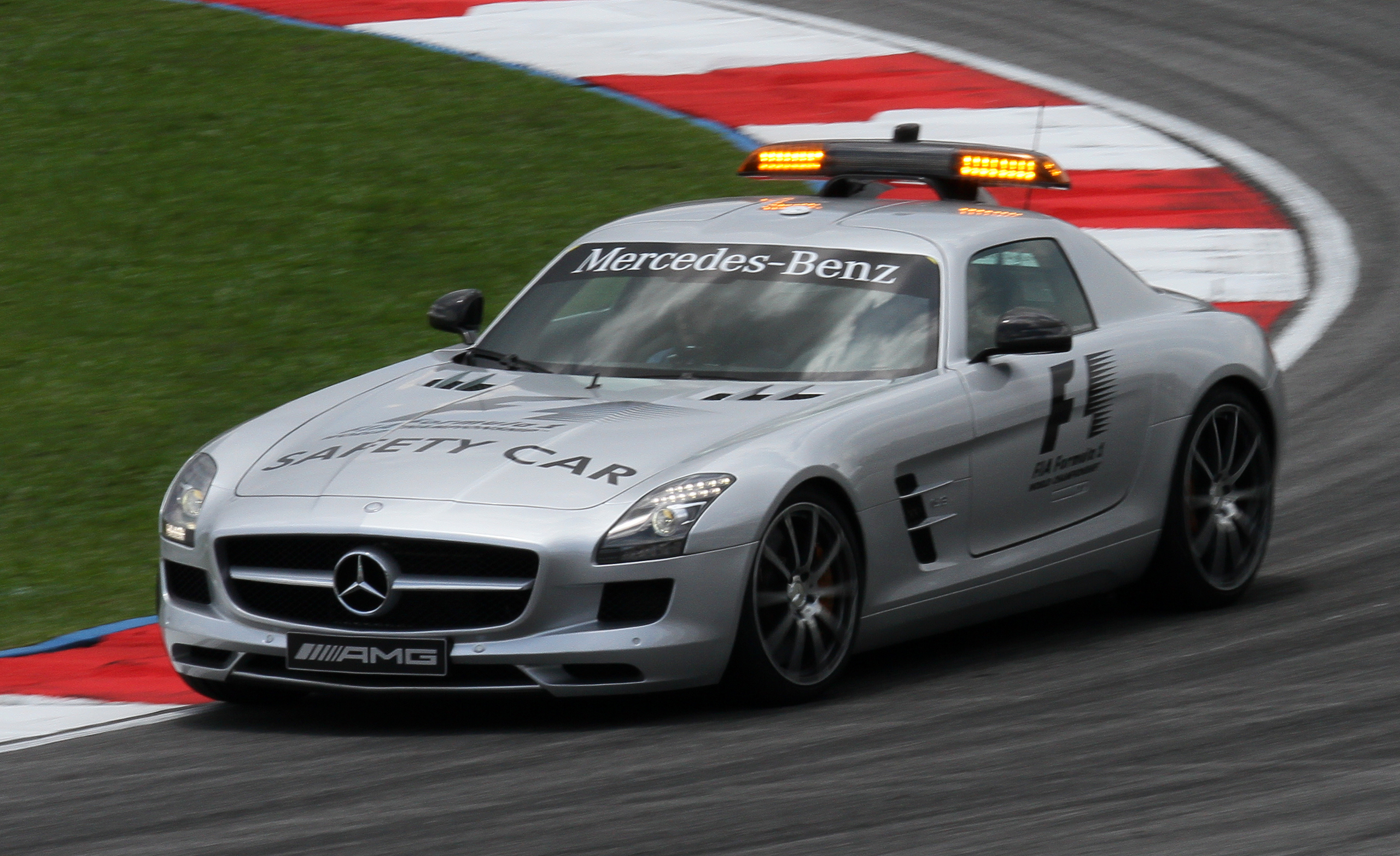
Mercedes-Benz supplied the SLS to the FIA Formula One World Championship as its safety car during its production cycle.

The SLS AMG was used as the official Safety Car in Formula One in the 2010, 2011 seasons and part through the 2012 season when it was replaced by the SLS AMG GT variant, which remained on duty up to the 2014 season coinciding with the end of production of the SLS.

=== SLS AMG E-CELL (2011) ===
The SLS AMG E-CELL competed in the Paul Pietsch Classic 2011 under the 'Classic meets Future' category.

The SLS AMG E-CELL competed in the 2011 Silvretta electric car race that took place in the Montafon region of Austria.

=== SLS AMG GT3 (2011–2015) ===
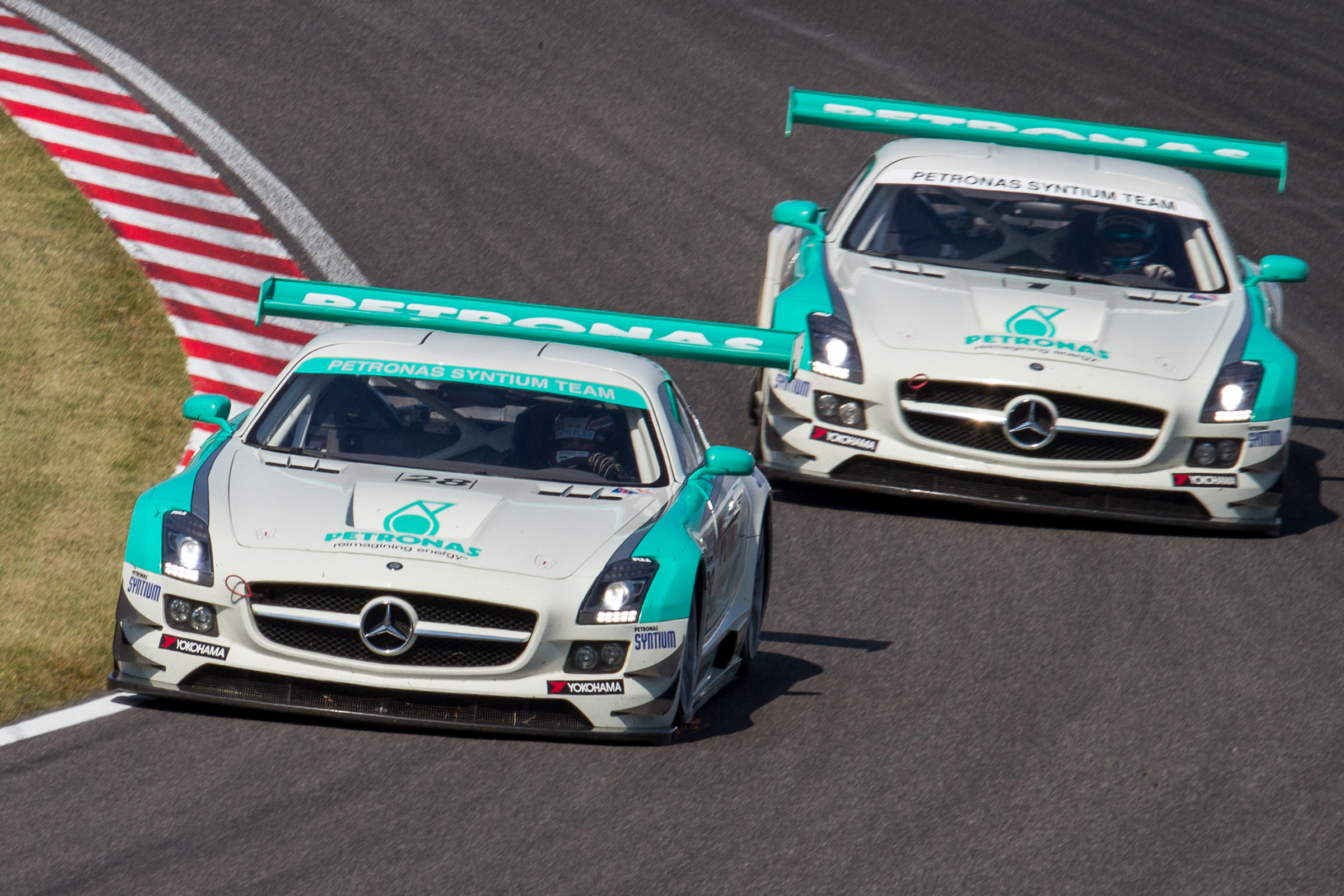
A Pair of the SLS AMG GT3 at Suzuka

SLS AMG GT3 first competed in the 2010 VLN Nürburgring Endurance Championship. At VLN Nürburgring, the SLS AMG GT3 was admitted into the SP9 class with "Balance of Performance" set to 1,350 kg (2,976 lb) and 409 kW; 548 hp (556 PS), and won its first race in October.

Since its launch in 2010, the SLS AMG GT3 has been competing in GT competitions around the world, such as the FIA GT3 European Championship, Blancpain Endurance Series, Blancpain Sprint Series, VLN, 24 Hours of Nürburgring, British GT Championship, Super GT, Australian GT Championship, Bathurst 12 Hour, Dubai 24 Hour, Macau GT Cup and Pirelli World Challenge. Also, the SLS AMG GT3 is used in the AMG Driving Academy programme.

The car won the 2012 and 2013 Dubai 24 Hour under Black Falcon Racing. Black Swan Racing and DragonSpeed currently uses the SLS AMG GT3 in the SCCA Pirelli World Challenge.

Erebus Racing has raced it in the Australian GT Championship, driven by Peter Hackett who is also the Chief Instructor at the Australian Mercedes Benz Driving Academy.

The SLS AMG GT3 competed in the Goodwood Festival of Speed 2011.

The SLS AMG GT3 took part in the 2012 Super GT season, with drivers Haruki Kurosawa and Hironori Takeuchi coming joint 5th in the GT300 drivers' championship. Five cars competed in the 2013 season; one won the 2013 Liqui Moly Bathurst 12 Hour, entered by Erebus Motorsport, while another set the fastest lap in, and won, the 2013 24 Hours of Spa, taking the first Mercedes win in the race since 1964.

== Marketing ==
Mercedes-Benz SLS AMG branded shoes were produced and sold in collaboration with Italian designer Santoni.

As part of the SLS AMG's market launch, a print ad (started in February 2010) featured a red Mercedes-Benz SLS AMG on grey asphalt against a black backdrop. Different variations of the ads feature brief messages including, such as "Oh Lord …" or "A cockpit. An engine. Two wings. Is it still a car?", for example. The print ad appeared in daily newspapers and magazines. A TV advert with Michael Schumacher telling the story of an experiment with the SLS AMG demonstrating its technical highlights from preparation and test phases to the realisation was produced. The TV ad was premiered on 30 January 2010 on all major television channels with a 60-second roadblock, followed by a 45-second version in reruns until the end of March. The Mercedes-Benz SLS AMG website was extended with the addition of an interactive guided tour of the AMG development plant. In addition, three editions of an online magazine provided extensive information on the performance ("Milliseconds"), the lightweight construction ("Milligrams") and the design ("Millimetres") of the SLS AMG. A reporter blog www.sls-amg-reporter.de was launched featuring fictional enthusiast Matthew K. posting reports, pictures and video clips of his travels as an SLS AMG reporter as he follows the global launch of the new gullwing. Starting at February 2010, a new iPhone application called "SLS AMG" was launched, featuring a preview of the car via 360° gameplay using the iPhone's accelerometer. The SLS AMG also appeared in Gran Turismo 5, scheduled for release in 2010.

The Cigarette 46' Rider, a boat inspired by the SLS AMG and built by Cigarette Racing, was unveiled in 2010 at the Miami International Boat Show.

As part of the SLS AMG Roadster launch in the UK, a video featuring David Coulthard catching a speeding golf ball hit by professional golfer Jake Shepherd with a Mercedes-Benz SLS AMG Roadster was produced, and was independently verified by a Guinness World Record adjudicator as title of farthest golf shot caught in a moving car. The SLS AMG was developed with the assistance of Coulthard.

Minichamps produced a limited (197 units) edition of SLS AMG GT3 1:18 scale model car for the IAA 2013. The vehicle includes 88 parts, painted in matt black and features poison green details.

As part of its US marketing, the SLS AMG was also used at the 2009 AMG Driving Academy season for its Stage 1.

== Production ==
Production of the SLS AMG began at Sindelfingen in January 2010. Sales commenced in mid-2010 in Europe and in mid-2011 in the United States. Production ended with the SLS AMG GT Final Edition in early 2014. A total of 2,734 SLS AMGs were sold in the U.S., including both Gullwings and roadsters. According to a post on mbworld.org by a Mercedes-Benz executive, total U.S. sales of SLS AMGs several months earlier were as follows: 1,837 coupés and 884 roadsters.

The production breakdown for the 2014 SLS Black Series Coupe in the USA:

- 132 – total vehicles, of which:
  - 39 (-197 Obsidian Black)
  - 32 (-048 designo Mystic White)
  - 30 (-278 Solarbeam Yellow)
  - 10 (-756 Imola Grey)
  - 7 (-775 Iridium Silver)
  - 7 (-044 Magno Alanite Grey)
  - 5 (-590 Mars Red)
  - 1 (-494 LeMans Red (pre-production car that was built before 494 was cancelled on the SLS platform))
  - 1 (-777 Silver Arrow (one-off car made for internal purposes))

== Successor ==
The SLS AMG was followed in 2014 by the substantially less expensive, and less powerful, Mercedes-AMG GT. Designed to compete against the Porsche 911, it relies on forced induction for its power and is available as a 340 kW; 456 hp (462 PS) GT and 380 kW; 500 hp (510 PS) GT S. Moers was also quoted as follows: "Speaking to Autocar at the (2015) Geneva Motor Show, Mercedes-AMG boss Tobias Moers confirmed that the company has no plans to create a new supercar to replace the SLS. According to Moers, Mercedes is 'not in that league' at this moment in time."

== Reception ==
In his review for Top Gear, Jeremy Clarkson praised the SLS AMG highly, saying it is "the greatest car on earth," noting that "it's more powerful than the Ferrari 458, louder than any Lamborghini, and it's way more fun than the 911RS GT Turbo 3S or whatever this week's ultimate Beetle (i.e., Porsche) is called. This is the thinking man's supercar."

== See also ==
- Mercedes-Benz 300 SL
- Mercedes-Benz 300 SLR
- Mercedes-Benz SLR McLaren
- Mercedes-AMG GT
