= BeoSound 2 =

The BeoSound 2 is a wireless speaker supplied by Bang & Olufsen. Wireless streaming options include Google Cast, Bluetooth, AirPlay and DLNA and B&O Multiroom. The device’s shell is aluminum.

== Beosound 2 MP3 Player ==
Beosound 2 MP3 Player was a portable device from the early third millennium. It played MP3- and WMA-format audio stored on Secure Digital or MMC media of up to 2 GB. It was built of stainless steel.

BeoSound 2 was designed by the British designer David Lewis and appeared on the market in May 2002. The A8 Earphones came as standard accessories to use with BeoSound 2.
