= 2007 Macau Grand Prix =

Formula Three motor race

Race details
Date	18 November 2007	
Official name	54th Polytec Macau Grand Prix
Location	Guia Circuit, Macau
Course	Temporary street circuit 6.120 km (3.803 mi)
Distance	Qualifying Race; 10 laps, 61.200 km (38.028 mi); Main Race; 15 laps, 91.800 km (57.042 mi)
Weather	Qualifying Race: Sunny and dry Main Race: Sunny and dry
- Qualifying Race

Pole
Driver	(United Kingdom) Oliver Jarvis	TOM'S
Time	2:11.696

Fastest Lap
Driver	(United Kingdom) Oliver Jarvis	TOM'S
Time	2:13.831 (on lap 7 of 7)

Podium
First	(United Kingdom) Oliver Jarvis	TOM'S
Second	(Estonia) Marko Asmer	Hitech Racing
Third	(Japan) Kazuya Oshima	TOM'S
- Main Race

Pole
Driver	(United Kingdom) Oliver Jarvis	TOM'S

Fastest Lap
Driver	(Estonia) Marko Asmer	Hitech Racing
Time	2:11.744 (on lap 6 of 15)

Podium
First	(United Kingdom) Oliver Jarvis	TOM'S
Second	(Japan) Koudai Tsukakoshi	Manor Motorsport
Third	(Japan) Kazuya Oshima	TOM'S

The 2007 Macau Grand Prix (formally the 54th Polytec Macau Grand Prix) was a Formula Three (F3) motor race held on the streets of Macau on 18 November 2007. Unlike other races, such as the Masters of Formula 3, the 2007 Macau Grand Prix was not part of any F3 championship, but was open to entries from all F3 championships. The race itself consisted of two races: a ten-lap qualifying race that determined the starting grid for the fifteen-lap main race. The 2007 race was the 54th Macau Grand Prix and the 25th for F3 cars.

TOM'S driver Oliver Jarvis won the Grand Prix after winning the event's Qualification Race the afternoon before. Jarvis started from pole position and led for most of the race, including every lap of the main race, to take his first and only victory in Macau. Koudai Tsukakoshi of Manor Motorsport was second, with another Japanese driver and Jarvis' TOM'S teammate Kazuya Oshima took third.

== Background and entry list ==
The Macau Grand Prix is a Formula Three (F3) race considered to be a stepping stone to higher motor racing categories such as Formula One and has been termed the territory's most prestigious international sporting event. The Macau Grand Prix was held for the 54th time in 2007, and the 25th time under F3 rules. It took place on the 6.2 km (3.9 mi) 22-turn Guia Circuit on 18 November 2007 with three preceding days of practice and qualifying.

Drivers had to compete in a Fédération Internationale de l'Automobile (FIA)-regulated championship meeting in 2007, either in the FIA Formula 3 International Trophy or one of the domestic championships, with the highest-placed drivers receiving priority in being invited to Macau. Each of the major F3 series was represented by its champion on the event's 30-car grid. Romain Grosjean, the Formula Three Euro Series champion, was joined in Macau by British champion Marko Asmer, German series winner Carlo van Dam and Japanese champion Kazuya Oshima. Six non-F3 drivers accepted invitations from the Macau Grand Prix Committee to compete in the Macau Grand Prix. They were GP2 Series driver Bruno Senna, Brendon Hartley of the Eurocup Formula Renault 2.0, and Macau natives Lei Kit Meng, Michael Ho, Rodolfo Ávila and Jo Merszei.

== Practice and qualifying ==
The Sunday race was preceded by two half-hour practice sessions: one on Thursday morning and one on Friday morning. Despite heavy damage to his car's left side from avoiding Stephen Jelley's stricken vehicle at Policeman's Bend, Grosjean set the fastest time for ASM in the first practice session with a late lap of 2 minutes, 14.223 seconds, nearly one-tenth of a second faster than anyone else. Sébastien Buemi was second in front of third-placed Asmer. Prema Powerteam's Roberto Streit, Koudai Tsukakoshi, Edoardo Mortara, Oliver Jarvis, Jelley, Senna and Nico Hülkenberg rounded out the session's top ten drivers. The session was stopped halfway through when Franck Mailleux spun into a barriera lining the track at the R Bend and his car was stranded on the track. Other incidents included Lei spinning at Lisboa corner but avoided damage to his car. Sam Bird later swiped the turn's wall and Walter Grubmüller limped to the pit lane with his front-right suspension bent.

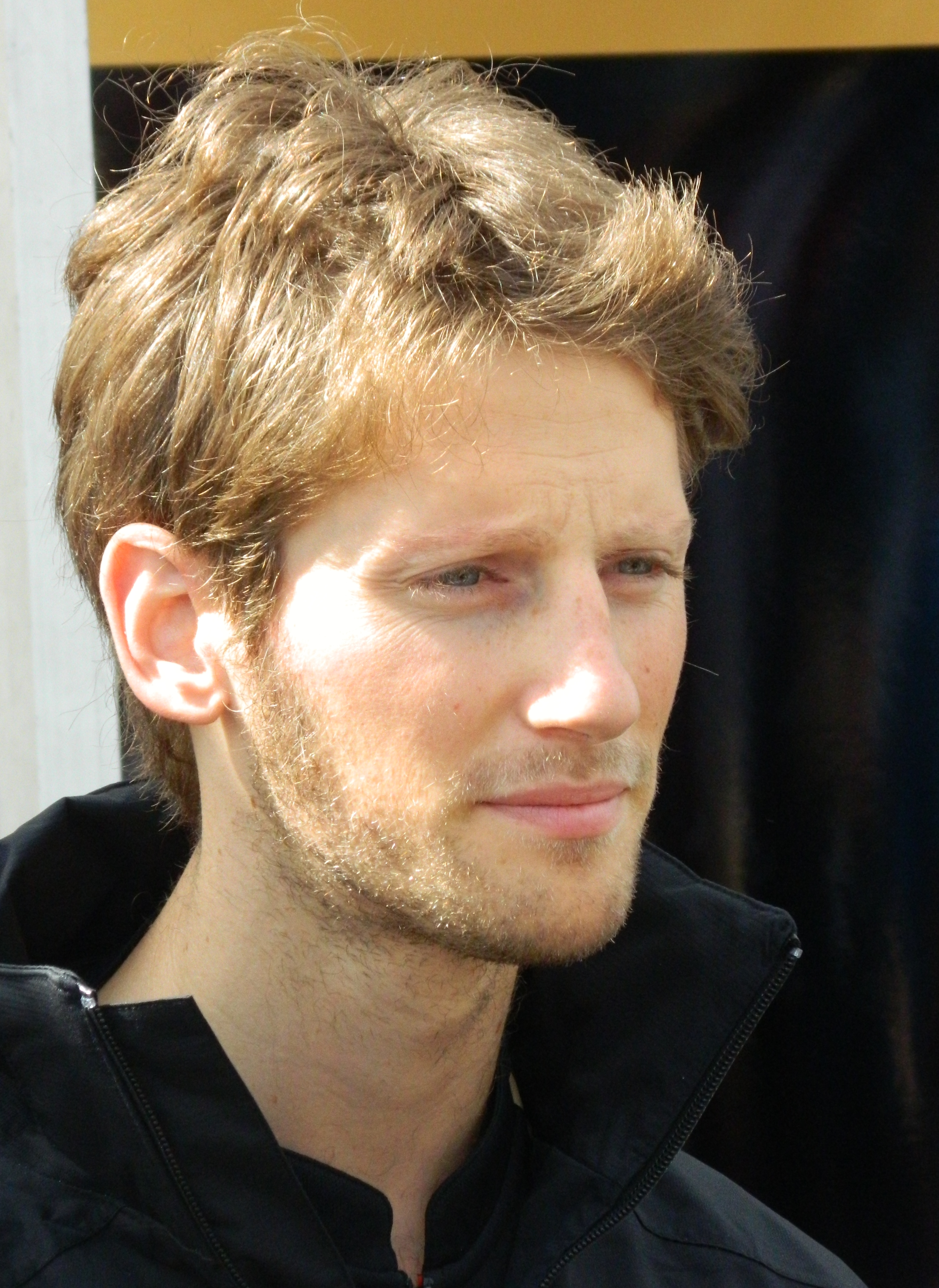
Romain Grosjean (pictured in 2011) crashed heavily in first practice but came back to take provisional second in the first qualifying session.

Qualifying was split into two 45-minute sessions, one on Thursday afternoon and one on Friday afternoon. Each driver's fastest time from either session counted toward their final starting place in the qualification race. The first qualifying session saw Asmer lap fastest at 2 minutes, 13.122 seconds set nine minutes remaining. The heavy damage to Grosjean's car forced him to sit out the session's opening minutes and gradually improved to be two-tenths behind and take provisional second. Despite clipping the wall, Yelmer Buurman ran strongly throughout and finished third. Buemi battled for pole position for most of the session before falling to fourth. Esteban Guerrieri improved late on to go fifth, ahead of Tsukakoshi in sixth and 2006 pole sitter Kamui Kobayashi in seventh. James Jakes, Streit and Jelley rounded out the top ten. Jarvis was the fastest driver who did not finish in the top ten, despite being as high as fourth at one point. Following him were the highest-placed rookie Mortara, Oshima, with Hülkenberg joining the Japanese driver on the seventh row despite a collision with a tyre barrier at Lisboa corner. The rest of the order was completed by Niall Breen, Atte Mustonen, Jonathan Kennard, Van Dam, Renger van der Zande, Senna, Bird, Mailleux, Hartley, Grubmüller, Takuya Izawa, Ávila, Ho, Lei and Cheong Lou Meng. Merszei was the only driver to not lap within 110% of Asmer. Other incidents included Mustonen damaging his suspension against the tyre wall and Bird hitting the Fisherman's Bend barrier. Senna collided with a tyre barrier at San Francisco Bend and Izawa hit him, stopping the session. Numerous penalties were imposed after qualifying. Kobayashi and Mutstonen were penalised three grid positions for entering the pit lane's fast lane before it was declared open. Hülkenberg and Cheong were similarly penalised for ignoring the red light signal at the pit lane exit which required them to enter the weighbridge.

Asmer spent much of the second 30-minute practice session evaluating a new car setup, which improved straightline speed and resulted in the fastest lap of 2 minutes, 12.894 seconds. Tsukakoshi was second-fastest, 0.038 seconds behind Asmer. Jarvis ran consistently near the top of the time sheets and was third. Mortara, Oshima, Grosjean, Buemi, Streit, Jelley and Van Dam occupied positions four to ten. Although the session was not stopped, several drivers came unstuck. Mailleux spun at Lisboa corner and broke his rear wing. Mustonen continued after a spin at the R Bend but crashed at Lisboa after colliding with another car. Jakes' session ended prematurely in a barrier at Moorish Hill with 11 minutes remaining.

The second qualifying session began fifteen minutes later than scheduled due to freight for the Guia Race of Macau being stranded in Beijing, and by crashes in the local touring car support races. When the session finally began, Jarvis set the early pace before being surpassed by Tsukakoshi one minute before the end of second qualifying. Jarvis immediately surpassed this with a lap time of 2 minutes, 11.696 seconds, securing pole position for the qualifying race. Amser set his best time on his final lap to join Jarvis on the grid's front row. Tsukakoshi was third, 0.216 seconds behind. Buemi remained fourth, while Mortara moved up to fifth. Grosjean dropped to sixth, while teammate Kobayashi dropped to seventh. The top ten was completed by Oshima, Streit and Buurman. Behind them the rest of the field consisted of Jakes, Guerrieri, Jelley, Van Dam, Hülkenberg, Bird, Breen, Senna, Kennard, Mustonen, Hartley, Mailleux, Van Der Zande, Izawa, Ho, Ávila, Grubmüller, Cheong, Lei and Merszei. The session was halted three times: Van Der Zande crashed into the barrier exiting Paiol corner, littering debris on the track. Hartley's car was stranded in a dangerous position after colliding with the wall at the exit of the Lisboa turn. The final stoppage was for Grubmüller who hit the barrier on his out-lap. Buemi and Buurman both received penalties after second qualifying: Buemi was summoned to the stewards office for a review of his fastest lap, and they determined that it was recorded under yellow flag conditions. They demoted Buemi demoted five places on the grid. Buurman was penalised three positions for being deemed to have moved onto the pit lane's fast lane before it was declared open.

=== Qualifying classification ===
Each of the driver's fastest lap times from the two qualifying sessions are denoted in bold.

Final qualifying classification
Pos	No.	Driver	Team	Q1 Time	Rank	Q2 Time	Rank	Gap	Grid
1	5	(United Kingdom) Oliver Jarvis	TOM'S	2:14.149	11	**2:11.696**	1		1
2	11	(Estonia) Marko Asmer	Hitech Racing	2:13.122	1	**2:11.888**	2	+ 0.192	2
3	21	(Japan) Koudai Tsukakoshi	Manor Motorsport	2:13.888	6	**2:11.912**	3	+ 0.216	3
4	2	(Switzerland) Sébastien Buemi	Räikkönen-Robertson Racing	2:13.436	4	**2:12.061**	4	+ 0.365	9^{1}
5	24	(Italy) Edoardo Mortara	Signature	2:14.265	12	**2:12.238**	5	+ 0.542	4
6	7	(France) Romain Grosjean	ASM F3	2:13.329	2	**2:12.248**	6	+ 0.552	5
7	9	(Japan) Kamui Kobayashi	ASM F3	2:13.925	7	**2:12.332**	7	+ 0.636	10^{2}
8	6	(Japan) Kazuya Oshima	TOM'S	2:14.353	13	**2:12.477**	8	+ 0.781	6
9	22	(Brazil) Roberto Streit	Prema Powerteam	2:14.128	9	**2:12.560**	9	+ 0.864	7
10	20	(Netherlands) Yelmer Buurman	Manor Motorsport	2:13.405	3	**2:12.895**	10	+ 1.199	13^{2}
11	18	(United Kingdom) James Jakes	Manor Motorsport	2:14.106	8	**2:13.168**	11	+ 1.472	8
12	25	(Argentina) Esteban Guerrieri	Signature	2:13.733	5	**2:13.229**	12	+ 1.533	11
13	1	(United Kingdom) Stephen Jelley	Räikkönen-Robertson Racing	2:14.142	10	**2:13.324**	13	+ 1.628	12
14	18	(Netherlands) Carlo van Dam	HBR Motorsport	2:15.325	18	**2:13.351**	14	+ 1.655	14
15	8	(Germany) Nico Hülkenberg	ASM F3	2:14.570	14	**2:13.735**	15	+ 2.039	15
16	15	(United Kingdom) Sam Bird	Carlin	2:16.231	21	**2:13.736**	16	+ 2.040	16
17	16	(Republic of Ireland) Niall Breen	Carlin	2:14.688	15	**2:13.852**	17	+ 2.156	17
18	3	(Brazil) Bruno Senna	Räikkönen-Robertson Racing	2:16.120	20	**2:13.856**	18	+ 2.160	18
19	4	(United Kingdom) Jonathan Kennard	Räikkönen-Robertson Racing	2:14.843	17	**2:14.432**	19	+ 2.736	19
20	26	(Finland) Atte Mustonen	Signature	**2:14.750**	16	2:14.902	20	+ 3.054	23^{2}
21	14	(New Zealand) Brendon Hartley	Carlin	2:16.442	23	**2:15.031**	21	+ 3.335	20
22	23	(Netherlands) Renger van der Zande	Prema Powerteam	**2:15.551**	19	2:15.910	22	+ 3.855	21
23	19	(France) Franck Mailleux	Manor Motorsport	2:16.292	22	**2:15.750**	23	+ 4.054	22
24	31	(Japan) Takuya Izawa	Fortec Motorsport	2:18.574	25	**2:16.213**	24	+ 4.517	24
25	12	(Macau) Michael Ho	Hitech Racing	2:19.947	27	**2:17.273**	25	+ 5.577	25
26	28	(Macau) Rodolfo Ávila	HBR Motorsport	2:19.758	26	**2:17.392**	26	+ 5.696	26
27	10	(Austria) Walter Grubmüller	Hitech Racing	**2:18.456**	24	2:18.511	27	+ 6.760	27
28	29	(Macau) Cheong Lou Meng	Swiss Racing Team	2:26.254	29	**2:22.154**	28	+ 10.458	28
29	17	(Macau) Lei Kit Meng	Carlin	2:24.360	28	**2:22.154**	29	+ 12.621	29
30	30	(Macau) Jo Merszei	Swiss Racing Team	2:27.440	N/C	**2:24.527**	30	+ 12.831	30
110% qualifying time: 2:24.865
**Bold time** indicates the faster of the two times that determined the grid order.

Notes:

- **^1** – Sébastien Buemi was penalised five places on the grid because of him ignoring yellow flags.
- **^2** – Kamui Kobayashi, Atte Mustonen and Yelmer Buurman were penalised by overspeeding in the pit lane and demoted three places on the grid.

== Qualifying race ==
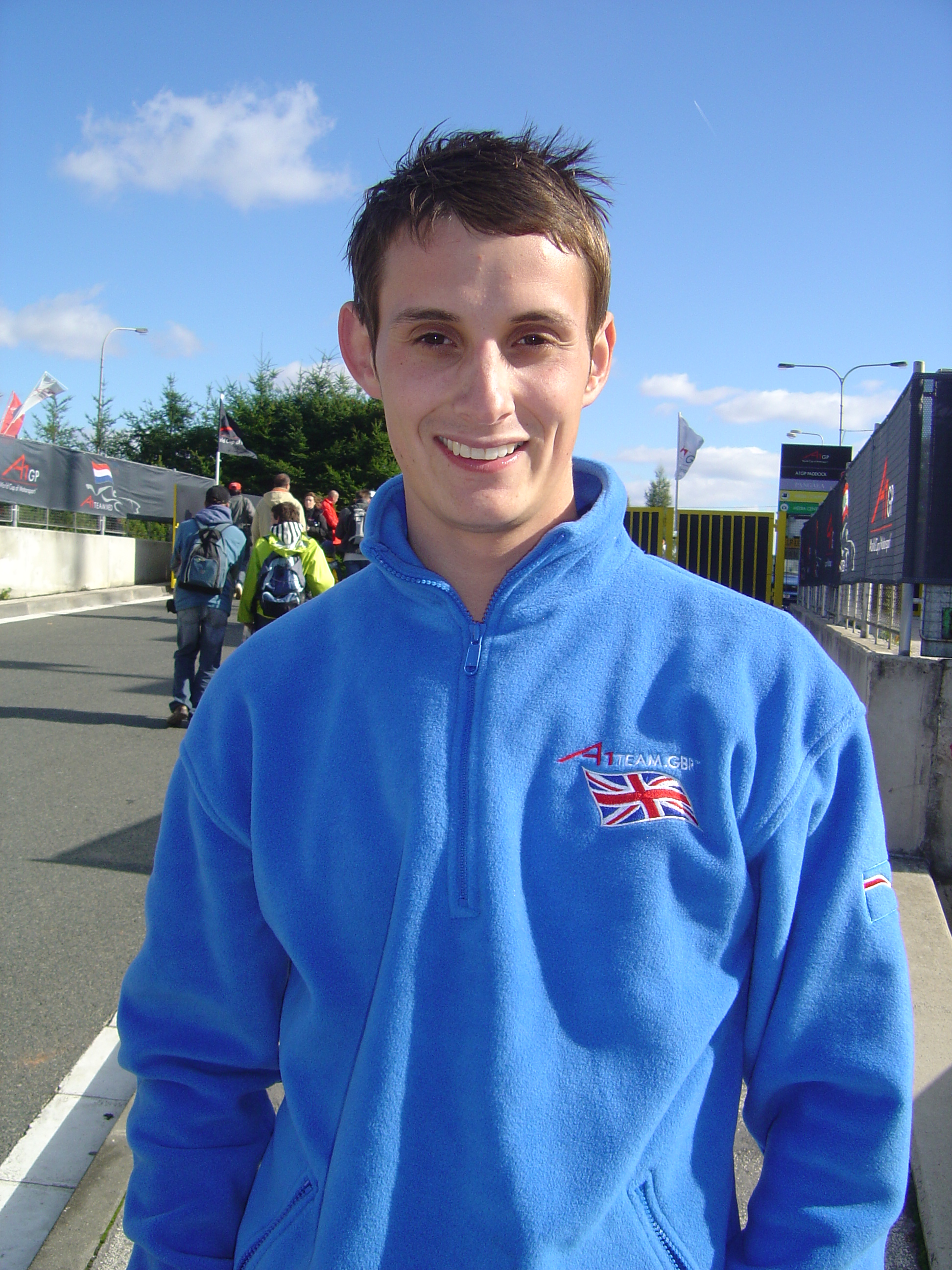
Oliver Jarvis led the majority of the race weekend to win both the qualifying race and the Grand Prix itself.

The qualifying race to set the grid order for the main race started on 17 November at 13:20 Macau Standard Time (UTC+08:00). The weather at the start of the qualifying race was dry and sunny with the air temperature 24 °C (75 °F) and the track temperature 47 °C (117 °F). Kobayashi was unable to begin because he stalled in his grid slot. On the grid, pole position starter Jarvis made a quick getaway, but Asmer, despite initial concerns that he would lose clutch control, accelerated faster and took the lead driving into Mandarin Bend. Further back, separate crashes involving multiple cars prompted the safety car's deployment. Mortara had a slow getaway and collided with Buemi at Lisboa corner and Tsukakoshi was caught up in the melee. Tsukakoshi survived the impact and rejoined the race but Grosjean suffered a puncture, causing Senna to swerve in avoidance. Grosjean drove slowly to pit lane for a replacement wheel but fell a lap behind Asmer. The crash moved Bird up to fifth place, and Oshima to sixth, but Guerrieri's race was ended early when he also crashed. Cheong and Lei each went into the pit lane for debris removal and a replacement front wing.

After three laps, the safety car was withdrawn and racing resumed, with Asmer leading. Jarvis stayed close by, hoping to overtake at Lisboa corner on the next lap. Van Der Zande attempted to pass Kennard as he crossed the start/finish line but he was unable to pass and crashed into the wall at the Lisboa turn, whereas Kennard resumed without trouble. Ho then made a pit stop and retired soon after. Jarvis slipstreamed on the main straight on the fifth lap and passed him on the outside for the lead at Lisboa corner. Two laps later, Senna passed Hülkenberg and started gaining on Buurmann. Hülkenberg then tried to overtook Senna to reclaim the position but lost control of his car and glanced the barrier at the Mandarin Bend corner. Both he and Senna retired. Because debris was scattered across the tarmac surface, localised waved yellow flags neutralised racing in that section of the circuit.

None of these issues bothered Jarvis, who had established a small but healthy lead over Asmer, who had in turn maintained a comfortable lead over Oshima. Jakes and Buurman were fourth and fifth. Mustonen pushed hard as the penultimate lap began, but he struck the outside tyre barrier at Fisherman's Bend, removing the rear wheels. His car had become stuck in the middle of the track. Mustonen's accident ended the qualifying race early and the race result was counted back two laps. This gave Jarvis the victory and pole position for the Grand Prix itself. He was joined on the front row by Asmer. Oshima completed the podium in third position, ahead of the British duo of Jakes and Bird. The final finishers were Buurman, Jelley, Streit, Tsukakoshi, Breen, Kennard, Hartley, Mailleux, Mustonen, Van Dam, Grubmüller, Ávila, Izawa, Merszei, Senna, Hülkenberg and Grosjean.

=== Qualifying race classification ===
Final qualifying race classification
Pos	No.	Driver	Team	Laps	Time/Retired	Grid
1	5	(United Kingdom) Oliver Jarvis	TOM'S	7	20:35.911	1
2	11	(Estonia) Marko Asmer	Hitech Racing	7	+1.687	2
3	6	(Japan) Kazuya Oshima	TOM'S	7	+3.159	6
4	18	(United Kingdom) James Jakes	Manor Motorsport	7	+4.722	8
5	15	(United Kingdom) Sam Bird	Carlin	7	+5.595	16
6	20	(Netherlands) Yelmer Buurman	Manor Motorsport	7	+6.563	13
7	1	(United Kingdom) Stephen Jelley	Räikkönen-Robertson Racing	7	+12.308	12
8	22	(Brazil) Roberto Streit	Prema Powerteam	7	+12.746	7
9	21	(Japan) Koudai Tsukakoshi	Manor Motorsport	7	+15.408	3
10	16	(Republic of Ireland) Niall Breen	Carlin	7	+15.693	17
11	4	(United Kingdom) Jonathan Kennard	Räikkönen-Robertson Racing	7	+16.734	19
12	14	(New Zealand) Brendon Hartley	Carlin	7	+16.984	16
13	19	(France) Franck Mailleux	Manor Motorsport	7	+17.988	23
14	26	(Finland) Atte Mustonen	Signature	7	+18.626	20
15	27	(Netherlands) Carlo van Dam	HBR Motorsport	7	+19.691	14
16	10	(Austria) Walter Grubmüller	Hitech Racing	7	+23.579	27
17	28	(Macau) Rodolfo Ávila	HBR Motorsport	7	+30.999	26
18	31	(Japan) Takuya Izawa	Fortec Motorsport	7	+48.176	24
19	30	(Macau) Jo Merszei	Swiss Racing Team	7	+1:17.613	30
20	3	(Brazil) Bruno Senna	Räikkönen-Robertson Racing	6	+1 Lap	18
21	8	(Germany) Nico Hülkenberg	ASM F3	6	+1 Lap	15
22	7	(France) Romain Grosjean	ASM F3	6	+1 Lap	5
NC	17	(Macau) Lei Kit Meng	Carlin	5	+2 Laps	29
Ret	23	(Netherlands) Renger van der Zande	Prema Powerteam	4	Accident	22
Ret	12	(Macau) Michael Ho	Hitech Racing	4	Accident damage	25
Ret	29	(Macau) Cheong Lou Meng	Swiss Racing Team	1	Accident	28
Ret	24	(Italy) Edoardo Mortara	Signature	0	Accident	4
Ret	2	(Switzerland) Sébastien Buemi	Räikkönen-Robertson Racing	0	Accident	9
Ret	25	(Argentina) Esteban Guerrieri	Signature	0	Accident	11
Ret	9	(Japan) Kamui Kobayashi	ASM F3	0	Stalled	10
Fastest lap: Oliver Jarvis, 2:13.831, 164.62 km/h (102.29 mph) on lap seven
The race was prematurely ended on the seventh lap

== Warm-up ==
A 20-minute warm-up session was held on the morning of the main race. Jarvis lapped fastest with a time of 2 minutes, 11.516 seconds in the session's final minute, with Oshima nearly two-tenths of a second from his time. Grosjean, Hartley, Buemi, Tsukakoshi, Streit, Mortara, Buurman and Asmer followed in positions three to ten. Guerrieri was the only driver who did not set a lap time during the session. Senna's left thumb was bruised from the previous day's qualification race crash, and he was forced to withdraw from the rest of the race meeting after being transported to the hospital for precautionary checks, which revealed his injury.

== Main race ==
The race began on 18 November at 15:35 local time. At the start of the race, the weather was dry and cloudy, with an air temperature of 23 °C (73 °F) and a track temperature of 25 °C (77 °F). Jarvis ran with little wing angle when the Grand Prix began from a standing start to gain an advantage in the highland section of the circuit, allowing him to make a quick getaway and keep the lead into the first corner. Asmer was briefly alongside Jarvis but fell to fourth behind Oshima and Bird. Oshima attempted to pass Jarvis, but the latter resisted, forcing Oshima to slow. Buurman retired on the first lap after attempting to gain ground but being unable to get any further than San Francisco Bend with three wheels attached to his vehicle. Breen was the second driver to withdraw from the race on lap two when another driver hit him from behind and put him into the tyre wall. Jarvis gradually extended his lead over Oshima at the front. Asmer slipstreamed Bird's car down the main straight, retaking third place from him in the braking zone for Lisboa corner at the start of the lap.

Oshima's lead over Asmer had shrunk before he responded by going faster on the next lap to get closer to Jarvis. Further down the field, Jelley was overtaken by Tsukakoshi, and Streit passed Jakes, who was pushing hard early in the race. Streit then gained another position by passing Jelley, while Mailleux overtook Jakes. Grosjean, who was 14th at the time, also advanced through the field, passing Grubmüller without much resistance. On lap three, Streit passed Bird as Grosjean passed Mustonen. Soon after, Mustonen collided with the barrier at Solitude corner, forcing him into the pit lane for repairs before retiring. Buemi and Kobayashi recovered from the back of the grid, with Buemi in 14th after overtaking Grubmüller and Mustonen. Meanwhile, Hartley overtook Kennard to enter the top ten. Grosjean's faster speed moved him past Van Dam for 12th. On the sixth lap, Asmer set a new Guia Circuit lap record of 2 minutes, 11.744 seconds. The safety car was deployed on lap seven after Mailleux crashed heavily at Moorish Hill corner, damaging his car's left side and leaving him stranded in a dangerous position.

The feeling on that cooling down lap was unbelievable. Very rarely am I an emotional guy in the car, but this was something special. I've won some big races and also the McLaren Autosport BRDC Award, but this tops them all I think. It is the biggest race win of my career. It has been a fantastic weekend."

— Oliver Jarvis on winning the 25th Macau Grand Prix held to Formula Three regulations.

The safety car remained on track for three laps, before being withdrawn at the start of lap 11. Jarvis maintained the lead at the restart. Oshima tried to pass Jarvis but became aware of his cold tyres. Tsukakoshi overtook Asmer for third driving into Mandarin Bend, and immediately set about on capitalising on Oshima's error. Grosjean moved to eighth place, while Kennard was the race's final retirement when he collided with the barrier at Lisboa corner, possibly due to being caught off guard on cold tyres. Tsukakoshi overtake Oshima on the outside heading towards Lisboa corner to take second place from his countryman. Tsukakoshi then set himself after Jarvis while Mortara overtook Hartley for tenth.However, Jarvis maintained the lead for the rest of the event to win the Grand Prix, having led every lap of the main race. Tsukakoshi followed 1.7 seconds later in second, while fellow Japanese driver Oshima took third. Off the podium, Asmer could not catch Oshima and settled for fourth. Streit and Bird were close behind each other in fifth and sixth with Jakes seventh. The top ten was completed by Grosjean, Jelley and Mortara. Outside the top ten, Buemi finished 11th, having moved up 17 from his starting position. He was ahead of Hartley, Kobayashi, Van Dam, Guerrieri, Izawa, Van Der Zande, Grubmüller. Local drivers Ávila, Cheong, Lei, Merszei. Jarvis lapped Hülkenberg and Ho, who completed the 24 classified finishers.

=== Main race classification ===
Final main race classification
Pos	No.	Driver	Team	Laps	Time/Retired	Grid
1	5	(United Kingdom) Oliver Jarvis	TOM'S	15	38:29.452	1
2	21	(Japan) Koudai Tsukakoshi	Manor Motorsport	15	+1.767	9
3	6	(Japan) Kazuya Oshima	TOM'S	15	+4.390	3
4	11	(Estonia) Marko Asmer	Hitech Racing	15	+5.331	2
5	22	(Brazil) Roberto Streit	Prema Powerteam	15	+6.558	8
6	15	(United Kingdom) Sam Bird	Carlin	15	+7.148	5
7	18	(United Kingdom) James Jakes	Manor Motorsport	15	+9.573	4
8	7	(France) Romain Grosjean	ASM F3	15	+10.176	22
9	1	(United Kingdom) Stephen Jelley	Räikkönen-Robertson Racing	15	+10.618	7
10	24	(Italy) Edoardo Mortara	Signature	15	+11.317	27
11	2	(Switzerland) Sébastien Buemi	Räikkönen-Robertson Racing	15	+13.055	28
12	14	(New Zealand) Brendon Hartley	Carlin	15	+13.959	12
13	9	(Japan) Kamui Kobayashi	ASM F3	15	+16.854	30
14	27	(Netherlands) Carlo van Dam	HBR Motorsport	15	+17.792	15
15	25	(Argentina) Esteban Guerrieri	Signature	15	+18.521	29
16	31	(Japan) Takuya Izawa	Fortec Motorsport	15	+20.762	18
17	23	(Netherlands) Renger van der Zande	Prema Powerteam	15	+24.806	24
18	10	(Austria) Walter Grubmüller	Hitech Racing	15	+26.631	16
19	28	(Macau) Rodolfo Ávila	HBR Motorsport	15	+45.405	17
20	29	(Macau) Cheong Lou Meng	Swiss Racing Team	15	+1:38.470	26
21	17	(Macau) Lei Kit Meng	Carlin	15	+1:47.359	23
22	30	(Macau) Jo Merszei	Swiss Racing Team	15	+1:47.797	19
23	8	(Germany) Nico Hülkenberg	ASM F3	14	+1 Lap	21
24	7	(Macau) Michael Ho	Hitech Racing	14	+1 Lap	25
Ret	4	(United Kingdom) Jonathan Kennard	Räikkönen-Robertson Racing	11	Accident	11
Ret	19	(France) Franck Mailleux	Manor Motorsport	6	Accident	13
Ret	26	(Finland) Atte Mustonen	Signature	6	Accident	14
Ret	16	(Republic of Ireland) Niall Breen	Carlin Motorsport	1	Retired	10
Ret	20	(Netherlands) Yelmer Buurman	Manor Motorsport	1	Accident	6
DNS	3	(Brazil) Bruno Senna	Räikkönen-Robertson Racing	—	Did not start	—^{3}
Fastest lap: Marko Asmer, 2:11.741, 167.22 km/h (103.91 mph) on lap six

Notes:

- ^3 – Bruno Senna did not start the Grand Prix after being ruled out with a bruised left thumb.
