= Roberto Streit =

Brazilian racing driver (born 1983)

- Nationality: (Brazil) Brazilian
- Born: 17 November 1983 (age 42) Rio de Janeiro (Brazil)

FIA GT – GT1 career
- Debut season: 2009
- Current team: Sangari Team Brazil
- Car number: 8
- Starts: 5
- Wins: 1
- Poles: 0
- Fastest laps: 0
- Best finish: 7th in 2009

Previous series
- 2008 2005–07 2004, 2006 2003 2002–03 2001 2001–03: Formula Nippon; All-Japan Formula Three; Formula 3 Euro Series; Formula Renault 2.0 Germany; Eurocup Formula Renault 2.0; Formula Chevrolet Brazil; Formula Renault 2.0 Italy

Championship titles
- 2001 2001: Formula Chevrolet Brazil; FR 2.0 Italy Winter Series

Roberto Streit (born 17 November 1983, in Rio de Janeiro) is a Brazilian racing driver.

== Career ==
=== Formula Renault ===
Streit debuted in 2001 in Formula Chevrolet Brazil. His first season was a very successful one, with Streit dominating the championship, and winning the title comfortably. That year, he also won the Italian Formula Renault Winter Series.

The following season, Streit competed in both the Eurocup Formula Renault 2.0, and Formula Renault 2.0 Italy championships for Cram Competition. He finished ninth in the Eurocup standings, scoring two podium places. In the Italian Championship, he took fourth place, scoring three podium places.

For the 2003 season, Streit remained in both championships but switched to Prema Powerteam. He once again finished ninth in the Eurocup, and also garnered a fourth-place finish in the Italian Championship.

=== Formula Three ===
In 2004, Streit stepped up to the Formula Three Euroseries with Prema. He finished tenth in the standings, taking nine points-scoring positions in twenty races, including a podium in the final race of the season at Hockenheim.

During the winter of 2004, Streit signed a contract with the Japanese F3 team Inging to compete full-time in the championship for the upcoming season. He finished sixth in the standings, including a win at Suzuka.

For 2006, Streit remained in the championship with Inging, and improved to third place with wins at Suzuka, Twin Ring Motegi and Autopolis. He guested at the two final races at Hockenheimring in the Formula Three Euroseries for Prema Powerteam, finishing seventh and fifth respectively.

In 2007, Streit finished as runner-up with seven wins, as he lost out to Kazuya Oshima by ten points.

=== Formula Nippon ===
In 2008, Streit moved to Formula Nippon with the Stonemarket Blaak Cerumo team. He finished thirteenth with one podium at Fuji Speedway. He returned to Formula Three for the Macau Grand Prix, but was forced to retire on the first lap after a clash with Sam Bird.

=== Sports car racing ===
Streit concentrated on sports car racing for 2009. He drove for Sangari Team Brazil in the FIA GT Championship. He finished seventh in the standings with one win in 2009 FIA GT Paul Ricard 2 Hours.

== Racing career ==
=== Career summary ===
Season	Series	Team	Races	Wins	Poles	F/Laps	Podiums	Points	Position
2001	Formula Chevrolet Brazil	???	11	7	6	?	11	?	1st
2001	FR 2.0 Italy Winter Series	???	4	2	2	?	3	?	1st
2002	Formula Renault 2.0 Italy	Cram Competition	9	1	0	1	3	108	4th
2002	Eurocup Formula Renault 2.0	Cram Competition	9	0	0	0	2	58	9th
2003	Formula Renault 2.0 Italy	Prema Powerteam	12	0	0	0	1	142	4th
2003	Formula Renault 2000 Masters	Prema Powerteam	8	0	0	0	0	44	9th
2003	Formula Renault 2.0 Germany	Prema Powerteam	4	0	0	0	0	20	29th
2004	Formula 3 Euro Series	Prema Powerteam	20	0	0	0	1	28	10th
2004	Masters of Formula 3	Prema Powerteam	1	0	0	0	0	N/A	15th
2005	All-Japan Formula Three	Inging	20	1	1	2	2	143	6th
2006	All-Japan Formula Three	Inging	18	3	1	4	7	182	3rd
2006	Formula 3 Euro Series	Prema Powerteam	2	0	0	0	0	4	17th
2006	Macau Grand Prix	Prema Powerteam	1	0	0	1	0	N/A	15th
2007	All-Japan Formula Three	Inging Motorsport	20	7	5	1	12	252	2nd
2007	Macau Grand Prix	Prema Powerteam	1	0	0	0	0	N/A	5th
2008	Formula Nippon	Stonemarket Blaak Cerumo / Inging	11	0	0	2	1	11	13th
2008	Macau Grand Prix	Räikkönen Robertson Racing	1	0	0	0	0	N/A	NC
2008	Super GT – GT500	Eneos Toyota Team LeMans	1	0	0	0	0	5	23rd
2009	FIA GT – GT1	Sangari Team Brazil	5	1	0	0	2	25	7th
2011	Formula 3 Sudamericana	Cesário Fórmula	1	0	0	0	0	0	NC

Sporting positions
Preceded by none	Italian Formula Renault 2.0 Winter Series; Champion; 2001	Succeeded by Toni Vilander
Preceded by Paulo Bueno	Formula Chevrolet Brazil; Champion; 2001	Succeeded by none
