= Oliver Jarvis =

British racing driver (born 1984)

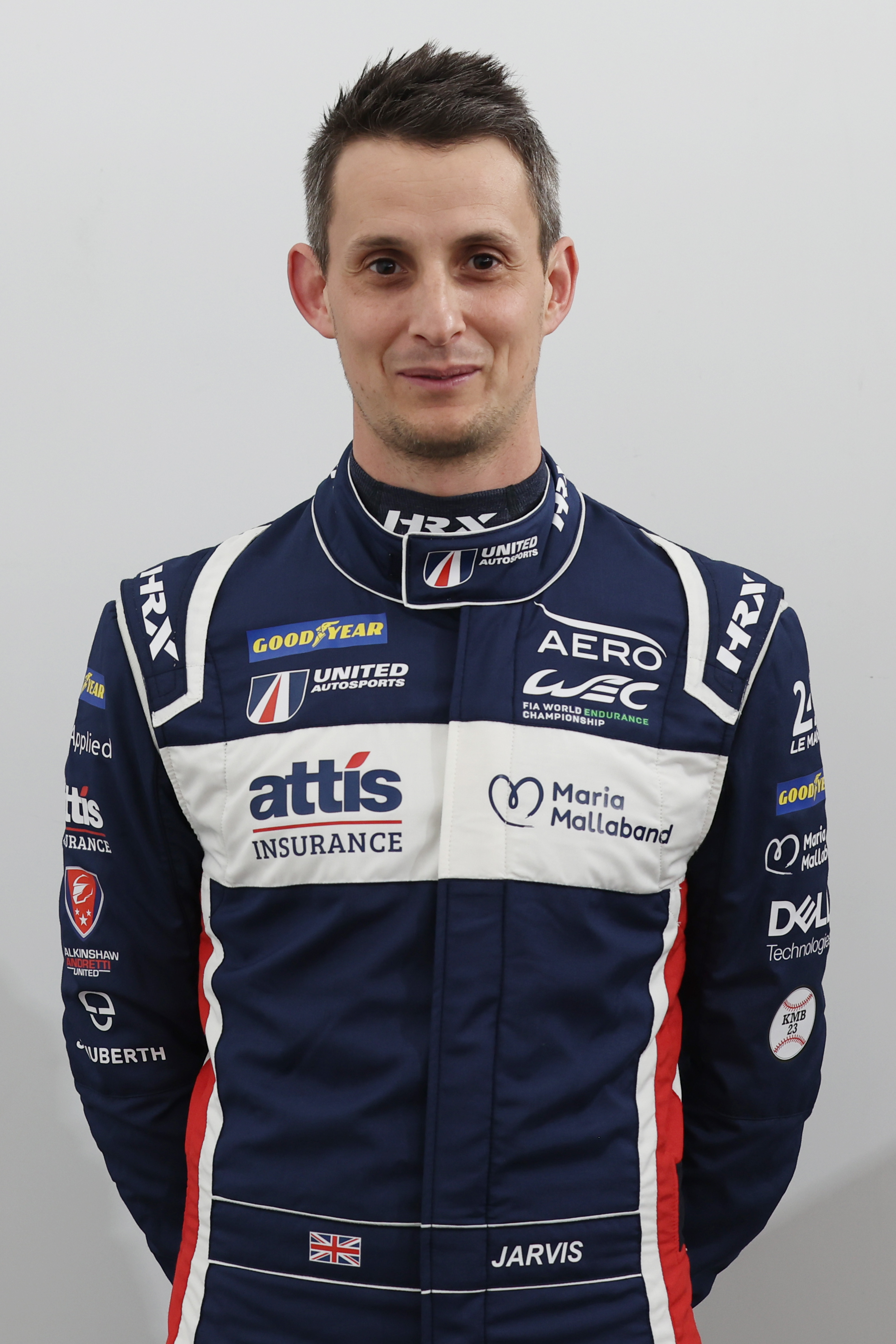
- Jarvis in 2022
- Nationality: (United Kingdom) British
- Born: Oliver Richard Benjamin Jarvis; 9 January 1984 (age 42) Burwell, Cambridgeshire, England
- Categorisation: FIA Platinum

Previous series
- 2009 2007 2007 2007 2006–07, 2007–08 2006 2006 2006 2005 2004–05 2003–04 2002–03: Asian Le Mans Series; Japanese F3; Super GT; Porsche Carrera Cup GB; A1 Grand Prix; Formula Renault 3.5 Series; British F3; Formula Ford 1600; Dutch Formula Renault; Formula Renault UK; FR2.0 UK Winter Series; British Formula Ford

Championship titles
- 2022 2007 2005: IMSA SportsCar Championship; Macau Grand Prix; Formula Renault UK

Awards
- 2005: McLaren Autosport Award
24 Hours of Le Mans career
- Years: 2010, 2012–
- Teams: Kolles, Audi Sport North America, Jackie Chan DC Racing, United Autosports
- Best finish: 2nd (2017)
- Class wins: 2 (2017), (2024)

Oliver Richard Benjamin Jarvis (born 9 January 1984) is a British professional racing driver currently racing in the European Le Mans Series with United Autosports.

Jarvis was an Audi factory driver in DTM and LMP1, and finished runner-up in the FIA World Endurance Championship in 2016. He later raced for Mazda and Acura in DPi, winning both the IMSA SportsCar Championship and the 24 Hours of Daytona in 2022 with Meyer Shank Racing. He is also a two-time LMP2 class winner at the 24 Hours of Le Mans.

== Early life ==
Born in Burwell, Cambridgeshire, Jarvis was educated at King's Ely.

== Early career ==
Jarvis was first introduced to motorsport from an early age when his father Carl was competing in Formula Ford 1600. Keen to try it for himself, and at just six years old, Jarvis enjoyed his first motocross competition, albeit then two wheels not four.

At the age of eight, Jarvis made the transition to race karts. During his ten years in karts, he achieved notable success in British and European events, as well as in World Karting as one of Tony Kart's Works driver.

Jarvis moved from European Karting when he was 18 to the highly competitive British single seater car championships racing in the Formula Ford category for two successful seasons before moving up to Formula Renault.

2005 proved to be an outstanding year of achievements for Jarvis when he became the 2005 Formula Renault UK Champion having gained five wins, seven podiums, four pole positions and three ELF /Atol Driver of the Day Awards. He was also awarded BRDC Rising Star status.

Jarvis' perfect end to the year was receiving the prestigious McLaren Autosport Young Driver of The Year Award that December, presented to him by Formula One legend Sir Stirling Moss.

2006 saw Jarvis move up to the British F3 International Series, racing for the famous Carlin Motorsport team, run by Trevor Carlin. Jarvis was an instant success, and won two races, beating Bruno Senna (nephew of the late Ayrton) to second in the standings. He went on to dominate the end of season Macau F3 Grand Prix in 2007, leading every lap and looking unchallenged throughout to take the biggest victory of his career.

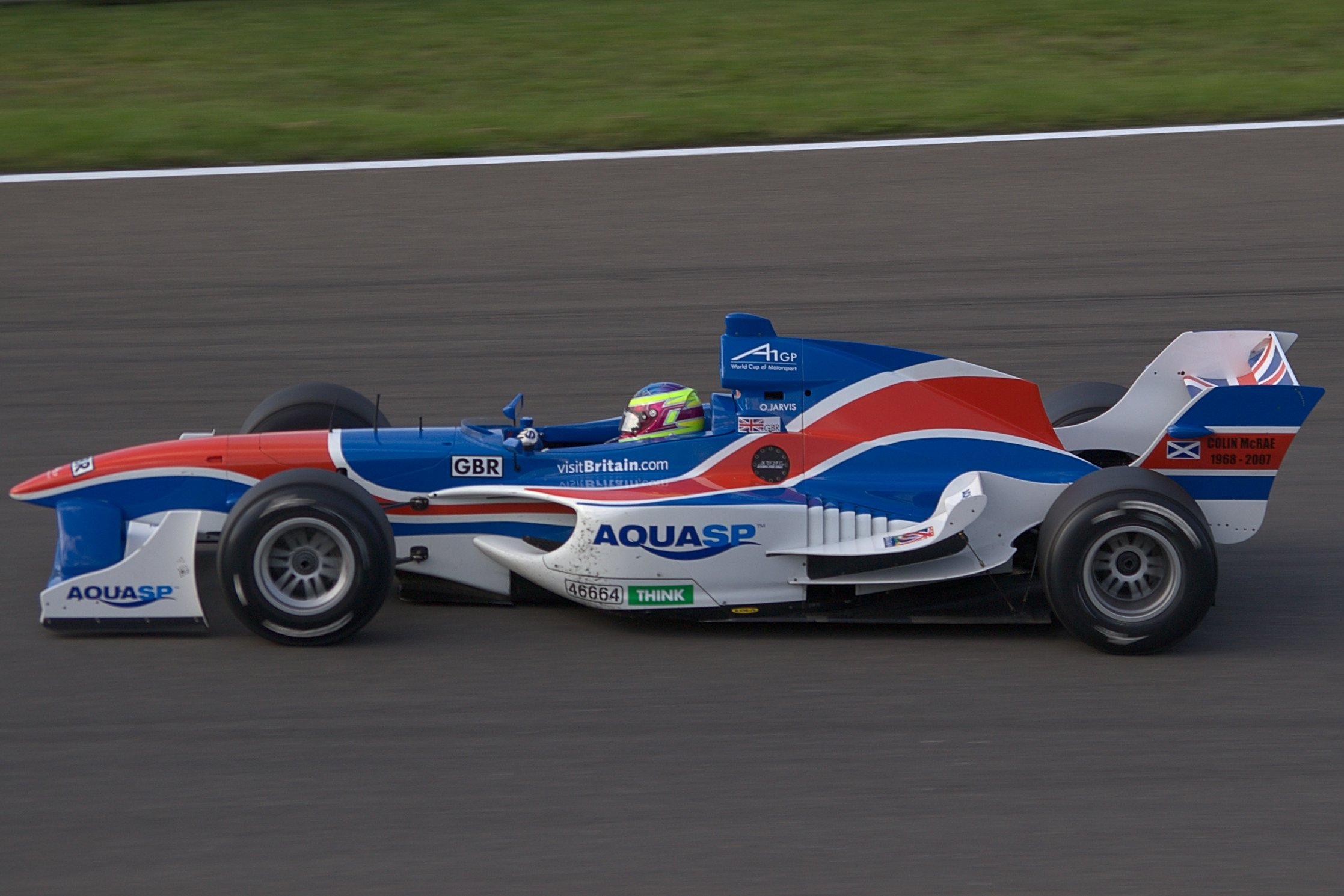
Jarvis competing at Zandvoort, where he would win the feature race.

Jarvis was added to the roster for A1 Team Great Britain in A1 Grand Prix for the 2006-07 season and drove the rounds in China and Mexico.

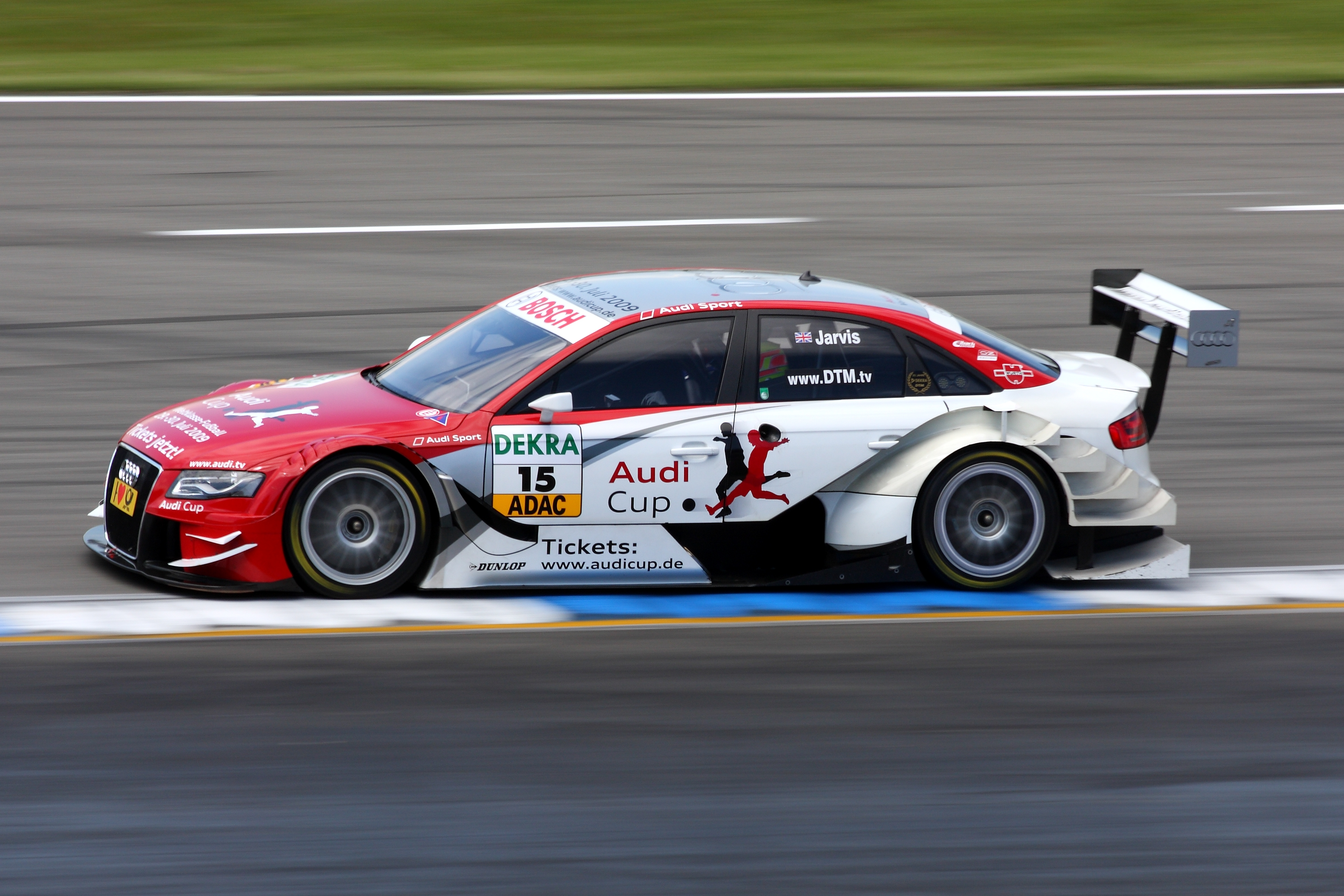
Jarvis driving for Audi (Phoenix) in the 2009 Deutsche Tourenwagen Masters season on the Hockenheimring.

Jarvis did get his first chance at the Beijing International Streetcircuit in China, the third race weekend of the season. Through a problematic weekend, where problems with the track arose, Jarvis started the Sprint race in eighth, and finished in seventh in a race that saw little racing, following seventh-starting South Africa spinning, bringing out the Safety Car for a majority of the race. In the Feature race, Jarvis therefore started seventh. After controversially making his mandatory pitstop on the lap the Safety Car was deployed (A1GP rules state that cars cannot pit during Safety Car periods), Jarvis ended up running eighth for a majority of the race, an eighth that was actually a net fourth, given the cars in the first four places were yet to pit. After they did, Jarvis moved up to fourth, and looked to be heading for that position, until the leading duo, The Netherlands driver Jeroen Bleekemolen and Germany's Nico Hülkenberg both retired on the same lap, leaving Jarvis to finish second, behind Italy's Enrico Toccacelo.

Jarvis' next outing was at the Mexico round. This time Jarvis went one better, winning the Feature race for Great Britain's first ever A1 Grand Prix victory.

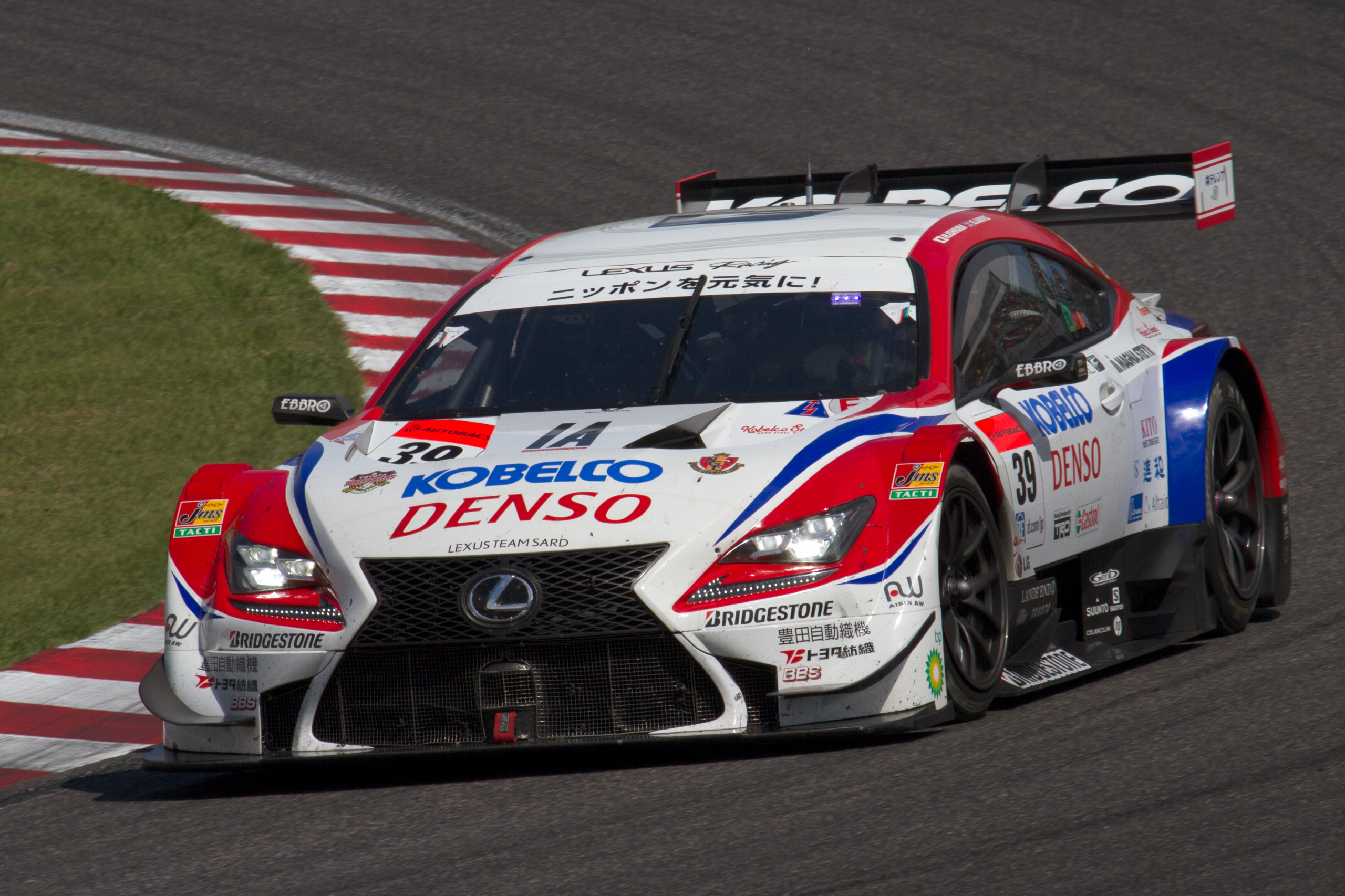
Jarvis competing in the 2014 Super GT season.

== DTM career ==
In 2008, Jarvis progressed to the Deutsche Tourenwagen Masters, racing for Team Phoenix in an Audi A4 DTM 2007. Having finished in the points twice, the Briton ended up 13th in the standings.

The following year, Team Phoenix retained Jarvis in the DTM, where he would partner Alexandre Prémat. A much improved campaign followed, where two podiums, including second at Zandvoort, where he scored his first pole position in the category, elevated Jarvis to ninth overall.

Switching to Abt Sportsline for the 2010 season, five results inside the top six meant that Jarvis would finish ninth in the standings once again.

In 2011, Jarvis remained in the DTM at Abt Sportsline. Despite taking a podium finish at Spielberg, Jarvis ended the season sitting tenth in the championship.

Jarvis would not be retained by Audi for the 2012 DTM season.

== Sportscar career ==
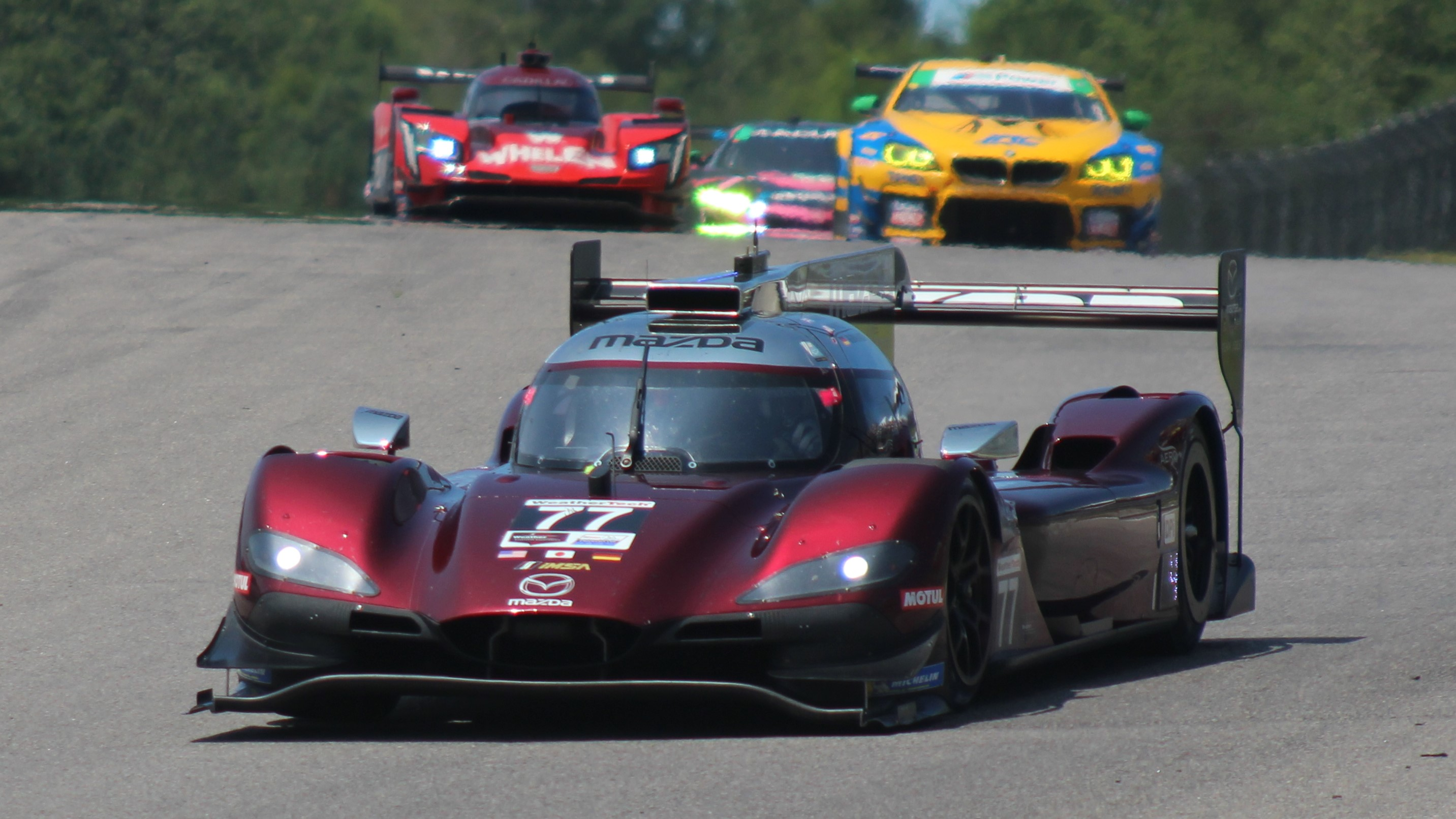
Jarvis would win the 2019 Mobil 1 SportsCar Grand Prix, Mazda's second IMSA win.

During the Pokka 1000km in Suzuka, Jarvis won the race partnering with Juichi Wakisaka and André Lotterer despite not having to drive throughout the race.

Javis would transition to the FIA GT1 World Championship in 2012, driving alongside Frank Stippler for Team WRT. With five podiums across the season, the pairing finished eighth overall. He also competed in that year's 24 Hours of Le Mans for Audi.

In 2013, Jarvis raced for Alex Job Racing with an Audi R8 Grand-Am in the 24 Hours of Daytona. He won the class. He also won the 2013 12 Hours of Sebring and came third at the 2013 24 Hours of Le Mans in an Audi R18 e-tron quattro.

When Audi pulled out of WEC, Jarvis signed a contract to race in the Blancpain GT Series Endurance Cup for Bentley during 2017. He also raced in the WEC under Jackie Chan DC Racing in LMP2. This led to him getting a class victory at Le Mans 24 Hours and second overall. They went on to score second in the championship standings.

For 2018, Jarvis would race in the IMSA SportsCar Championship for Mazda Team Joest.

Jarvis teamed up with Tom Blomqvist at Meyer Shank Racing w/ Curb-Agajanian in the IMSA SportsCar Championship for the 2022 season. The pair would end up winning the title, having taken a pair of victories, including one at the 24 Hours of Daytona.

== Racing record ==
=== Racing career summary ===
Season	Series	Team	Races	Wins	Poles	F/Laps	Podiums	Points	Position
2002	British Formula Ford Championship	Continental Racing	18	0	0	0	0	216	7th
2002	Formula Ford Winter Series UK		4	0	0	?	3	111	**3rd**
2003	British Formula Ford Championship	ComTec Racing	20	0	1	0	3	274	8th
2003	Formula Renault 2.0 UK Winter Series	Motaworld Racing	4	0	0	0	0	15	14th
2003	Formula Ford Festival		1	0	0	0	0	N/A	5th
2004	Formula Renault 2.0 UK Championship	Motaworld Racing	17	0	0	0	0	253	8th
2004	Formula Renault 2.0 UK Winter Series	Manor Motorsport	4	1	0	0	2	99	**3rd**
2005	Formula Renault 2.0 UK Championship	Manor Motorsport	20	5	3	1	12	436	**1st**
2005	Formula Renault 2.0 Netherlands	Manor Motorsport	2	0	0	0	0	21	20th
2006	British Formula 3 International Series	Carlin Motorsport	22	2	5	3	11	250	**2nd**
2006	Masters of Formula 3	Carlin Motorsport	1	0	0	0	0	N/A	8th
2006	Macau Grand Prix	Carlin Motorsport	1	0	0	0	0	N/A	15th
2006	Formula Renault 3.5 Series	Victory Engineering	2	0	0	0	0	0	37th
2006	Formula Ford 1600 – Walter Hayes Trophy		1	0	0	0	0	N/A	18th
2006–07	A1 Grand Prix	A1 Team Great Britain	2	0	0	0	1	92‡	**3rd**‡
2007	Super GT – GT500	Houzan Toyota Team TOM'S	1	1	0	0	1	20	16th
2007	Japanese Formula 3 Championship	TOM'S	20	3	2	4	16	238	**3rd**
2007	Macau Grand Prix	TOM'S	1	1	1	0	1	N/A	**1st**
2007	Porsche Carrera Cup Great Britain	Porsche Motorsport	2	0	0	0	0	0	NC†
2007–08	A1 Grand Prix season	A1 Team Great Britain	10	1	0	1	4	126‡	**3rd**‡
2008	Deutsche Tourenwagen Masters	Team Phoenix	11	0	0	0	0	5	13th
2009	Asian Le Mans Series – LMP1	Kolles	2	0	0	0	1	10	4th
2009	Deutsche Tourenwagen Masters	Team Phoenix	10	0	1	0	2	18	9th
2010	Deutsche Tourenwagen Masters	Abt Sportsline	11	0	0	0	0	18	9th
2010	24 Hours of Le Mans	Kolles	1	0	0	0	0	N/A	DNF
2011	Deutsche Tourenwagen Masters	Abt Sportsline	10	0	0	0	1	14	10th
2012	FIA GT1 World Championship	Belgian Audi Club Team WRT	18	0	0	2	5	81	8th
2012	Blancpain Endurance Series – Pro	Belgian Audi Club WRT	1	0	0	0	1	15	20th
2012	24 Hours of Le Mans	Audi Sport North America	1	0	0	0	1	N/A	**3rd**
2012	24 Hours of Nürburgring – SP9	Speedhunters Team WRT	1	0	0	0	0	N/A	14th
2013	FIA GT Series – Pro	Belgian Audi Club Team WRT	2	0	0	0	0	12	17th
2013	Blancpain Endurance Series – Pro	Phoenix Racing	5	0	0	0	0	24	10th
2013	FIA World Endurance Championship – LMP1	Audi Sport Team Joest	2	0	0	0	2	45	9th
2013	American Le Mans Series – LMP1	Audi Sport Team Joest	1	1	0	0	1	0	NC†
2013	24 Hours of Le Mans	Audi Sport Team Joest	1	0	0	0	1	N/A	**3rd**
2013	Rolex Sports Car Series – GT	Audi Sport customer racing/AJR	1	1	0	0	1	35	46th
2014	FIA World Endurance Championship – LMP1	Audi Sport Team Joest	1	0	0	0	0	0	NC
2014	24 Hours of Le Mans	Audi Sport Team Joest	1	0	0	0	0	N/A	DNF
2014	United SportsCar Championship – GTD	Fall-Line Motorsports	1	0	0	0	0	1	134th
2014	Super GT – GT500	Lexus Team SARD	8	0	0	0	0	24	13th
2015	FIA World Endurance Championship – LMP1	Audi Sport Team Joest	8	0	0	0	1	99	4th
2015	24 Hours of Le Mans	Audi Sport Team Joest	1	0	0	0	0	N/A	4th
2016	FIA World Endurance Championship – LMP1	Audi Sport Team Joest	9	2	3	0	6	147.5	**2nd**
2016	24 Hours of Le Mans	Audi Sport Team Joest	1	0	0	0	1	N/A	**3rd**
2017	Blancpain GT Series Endurance Cup	Bentley Team M-Sport	5	0	0	0	0	2	42nd
2017	Intercontinental GT Challenge	Bentley Team M-Sport	2	0	0	0	1	15	9th
2017	FIA World Endurance Championship – LMP2	Jackie Chan DC Racing	9	3	1	1	6	175	**2nd**
2017	24 Hours of Le Mans – LMP2	Jackie Chan DC Racing	1	1	0	0	1	N/A	**1st**
2018	IMSA SportsCar Championship – Prototype	Mazda Team Joest	10	0	0	1	2	234	8th
2018	Stock Car Brasil Championship	Prati-Donaduzzi	1	0	0	0	0	0	NC†
2018	FIA GT World Cup	KCMG	1	0	0	0	0	N/A	12th
2019	IMSA SportsCar Championship – DPi	Mazda Team Joest	10	1	3	3	4	268	5th
2019	Blancpain GT Series Endurance Cup	KCMG	1	0	0	0	0	0	NC
2019	Intercontinental GT Challenge	KCMG	5	0	0	0	0	18	23rd
2019	24H GT Series – Continents'	KCMG	1	0	0	0	0	0	NC
2019	24 Hours of Le Mans – LMGTE Pro	Risi Competizione	1	0	0	0	0	N/A	11th
2019–20	FIA World Endurance Championship – LMP1	Team LNT	1	0	0	0	0	6.5	22nd
2019–20	FIA World Endurance Championship – LMP2	United Autosports	1	0	0	0	1	15	15th
2020	IMSA SportsCar Championship – DPi	Mazda Team Joest	1	0	0	0	1	247	7th
2020	IMSA SportsCar Championship – DPi	Mazda Motorsports	8	0	0	0	2	247	7th
2020	Intercontinental GT Challenge	Bentley Team M-Sport	2	0	0	0	0	2	20th
2020	24 Hours of Le Mans – LMP2	G-Drive Racing with Algarve	1	0	0	0	0	N/A	DNF
2021	IMSA SportsCar Championship – DPi	Mazda Motorsports	10	0	0	0	6	3264	**3rd**
2021	FIA World Endurance Championship – LMP2	Risi Competizione	2	0	0	0	0	0	NC†
2021	24 Hours of Le Mans – LMP2	Risi Competizione	1	0	0	0	0	N/A	DNF
2022	IMSA SportsCar Championship – DPi	Meyer Shank Racing w/ Curb-Agajanian	10	2	0	0	7	3432	**1st**
2022	FIA World Endurance Championship – LMP2	United Autosports USA	6	1	0	0	2	113	**3rd**
2022	24 Hours of Le Mans – LMP2	United Autosports USA	1	0	0	0	0	N/A	6th
2023	FIA World Endurance Championship – LMP2	United Autosports	7	1	3	1	2	92	5th
2023	Asian Le Mans Series – LMP2	United Autosports	4	0	0	0	1	38	7th
2023	European Le Mans Series – LMP2	United Autosports	6	3	1	0	3	100	**2nd**
2023	24 Hours of Le Mans – LMP2	United Autosports	1	0	0	0	0	N/A	8th
2023	IMSA SportsCar Championship – LMP2	Era Motorsport	1	0	0	0	0	0	NC†
2024	IMSA SportsCar Championship – GTD Pro	Pfaff Motorsports	10	0	0	0	2	2689	7th
2024	European Le Mans Series – LMP2	United Autosports	5	0	0	1	1	39	7th
2024	24 Hours of Le Mans - LMP2	United Autosports	1	1	0	0	1	N/A	**1st**
2025	European Le Mans Series - LMP2 Pro-Am	United Autosports	6	0	0	2	1	62	7th
2025	24 Hours of Le Mans – LMP2 Pro-Am	United Autosports	1	0	0	0	0	N/A	6th
2025	IMSA SportsCar Championship - LMP2	United Autosports USA	1	0	0	0	0	770	32nd
2025	IMSA SportsCar Championship - LMP2	Era Motorsport	2	0	0	0	1	770	32nd
2026	IMSA SportsCar Championship - LMP2	Intersport Racing	5	0	0	0	0	1182	24th
2026	European Le Mans Series - LMP2 Pro-Am	United Autosports	6	0	0	0	2	46	7th
2026	24 Hours of Le Mans – LMP2 Pro-Am	United Autosports	1	0	0	0	0	N/A	7th

^{†} As Jarvis was a guest driver, he was ineligible for points. ^{‡} Teams' standings ^{*} Season still in progress.

=== Complete British Formula 3 International Series results ===
(key) (Races in bold indicate pole position; races in italics indicate fastest lap)

Year	Entrant	Engine	1	2	3	4	5	6	7	8	9	10	11	12	13	14	15	16	17	18	19	20	21	22	DC	Pts
2006	Carlin Motorsport	Mugen	OUL; 1; 3	OUL; 2; 4	DON; 1; 4	DON; 2 Ret	PAU; 1; 3	PAU; 2; 7	MON; 1; 4	**MON**; **2**; 1	SNE; 1; 4	**SNE**; **2**; 2	SPA; 1; 5	SPA; 1; 12	SIL; 1; 4	SIL; 2; 3	BRH; 1; 4	**BRH**; **2**; 1	**MUG**; **1** Ret	**MUG**; **2**; 2	SIL; 1; 2	SIL; 2; 3	**THR**; **1**; 2	THR; 2; 3	2nd	250

=== Complete Japanese Formula 3 Championship results ===
(key) (Races in bold indicate pole position) (Races in italics indicate fastest lap)

Year	Team	Engine	1	2	3	4	5	6	7	8	9	10	11	12	13	14	15	16	17	18	19	20	DC	Pts
2007	DHG Team TOM'S	Toyota	FUJ; 1; 1	FUJ; 2; 3	SUZ; 1; 2	SUZ; 2; 3	MOT; 1; 1	MOT; 2; 5	OKA; 1; 2	OKA; 2; 5	SUZ; 1; 4	SUZ; 2; 2	AUT; 1; 2	AUT; 2; 3	AUT; 3; 2	FUJ; 1; 3	FUJ; 2; 3	SEN; 1; 3	**SEN**; **2**; 1	SEN; 3; 2	MOT; 1; 3	MOT; 2 Ret	3rd	238

=== Complete A1 Grand Prix results ===
(key) (Races in bold indicate pole position) (Races in italics indicate fastest lap)

Year	Entrant	1	2	3	4	5	6	7	8	9	10	11	12	13	14	15	16	17	18	19	20	21	22	DC	Points
2006–07	Great Britain	NED; SPR	NED; FEA	CZE; SPR	CZE; FEA	BEI; SPR; 7	BEI; FEA; 2	MYS; SPR	MYS; FEA	IDN; SPR	IDN; FEA	NZL; SPR	NZL; FEA	AUS; SPR	AUS; FEA	RSA; SPR	RSA; FEA	MEX; SPR; 2	MEX; FEA; 1	SHA; SPR	SHA; FEA	GBR; SPR	GBR; SPR	**3rd**	**92**
2007–08	Great Britain	NED; SPR; 7	NED; FEA; 1	CZE; SPR	CZE; FEA	MYS; SPR; 6	MYS; FEA; 12	ZHU; SPR; 6	ZHU; FEA; 5	NZL; SPR	NZL; FEA	AUS; SPR	AUS; FEA	RSA; SPR; 2	RSA; FEA; 11	MEX; SPR; 2	MEX; FEA; 2	SHA; SPR	SHA; FEA	GBR; SPR	GBR; SPR			3rd	126

=== Complete Super GT results ===
(key) (Races in bold indicate pole position) (Races in italics indicate fastest lap)

Year	Team	Car	Class	1	2	3	4	5	6	7	8	9	DC	Points
2007	Toyota Team TOM'S	Lexus SC430	GT500	SUZ	OKA	FUJ	SEP	SUG	SUZ; 1	MOT	AUT	FUJ	16th	20
2014	Lexus Team SARD	Lexus RC F	GT500	OKA; 4	FUJ; 6	AUT; 11	SUG; 6	FUJ; 12	SUZ; 11	BUR; 7	MOT; 9		13th	24

=== Complete Deutsche Tourenwagen Masters results ===
(key) (Races in bold indicate pole position) (Races in italics indicate fastest lap)

Year	Team	Car	1	2	3	4	5	6	7	8	9	10	11	Pos	Points
2008	Team Phoenix	Audi A4 DTM 2007	HOC; 9	OSC; 15	MUG; 5	LAU; 8	NOR; 12	ZAN; 17†	NÜR; 13	BRH; 12	CAT; 9	BUG; Ret	HOC; 10	13th	5
2009	Team Phoenix	Audi A4 DTM 2008	HOC; 3	LAU; Ret	NOR; Ret	**ZAN**; 2	OSC; 15†	NÜR; Ret	BRH; 8	CAT; 9	DIJ; 15	HOC; 6		9th	18
2010	Abt Sportsline	Audi A4 DTM 2009	HOC; Ret	VAL; 14†	LAU; 11	NOR; 4	NÜR; 11	ZAN; 6	BRH; 6	OSC; 13	HOC; 6	ADR; 5	SHA; 17	9th	18
2011	Abt Sportsline	Audi A4 DTM 2009	HOC; 9	ZAN; 10	SPL; 3	LAU; 5	NOR; 15	NÜR; 10	BRH; 9	OSC; 9	VAL; 6	HOC; 8		10th	14
Sources:

- † — Retired, but was classified as he completed 90 per cent of the winner's race distance.

=== Complete 24 Hours of Le Mans results ===
Year	Team	Co-Drivers	Car	Class	Laps	Pos.	Class Pos.
2010	(Germany) Kolles	(Denmark) Christian Bakkerud (Netherlands) Christijan Albers	Audi R10 TDI	LMP1	331	DNF	DNF
2012	(Germany) Audi Sport North America	(Italy) Marco Bonanomi (Germany) Mike Rockenfeller	Audi R18 ultra	LMP1	375	**3rd**	**3rd**
2013	(Germany) Audi Sport Team Joest	(Spain) Marc Gené (Brazil) Lucas di Grassi	Audi R18 e-tron quattro	LMP1	347	**3rd**	**3rd**
2014	(Germany) Audi Sport Team Joest	(Portugal) Filipe Albuquerque (Italy) Marco Bonanomi	Audi R18 e-tron quattro	LMP1-H	25	DNF	DNF
2015	(Germany) Audi Sport Team Joest	(Brazil) Lucas di Grassi (France) Loïc Duval	Audi R18 e-tron quattro	LMP1	392	4th	4th
2016	(Germany) Audi Sport Team Joest	(Brazil) Lucas di Grassi (France) Loïc Duval	Audi R18	LMP1	372	**3rd**	**3rd**
2017	(China) Jackie Chan DC Racing	(China) Ho-Pin Tung (France) Thomas Laurent	Oreca 07-Gibson	LMP2	366	**2nd**	**1st**
2019	(United States) Risi Competizione	(France) Jules Gounon (Brazil) Pipo Derani	Ferrari 488 GTE Evo	GTE; Pro	329	40th	11th
2020	(Russia) G-Drive Racing with Algarve	(Republic of Ireland) Ryan Cullen (United Kingdom) Nick Tandy	Aurus 01-Gibson	LMP2	105	DNF	DNF
2021	(United States) Risi Competizione	(Republic of Ireland) Ryan Cullen (Brazil) Felipe Nasr	Oreca 07-Gibson	LMP2	275	NC	NC
2022	(United States) United Autosports USA	(United Kingdom) Alex Lynn (United States) Josh Pierson	Oreca 07-Gibson	LMP2	368	10th	6th
2023	(United Kingdom) United Autosports	(United Kingdom) Tom Blomqvist (United States) Josh Pierson	Oreca 07-Gibson	LMP2	323	18th	8th
2024	(United Kingdom) United Autosports	(United States) Bijoy Garg (United States) Nolan Siegel	Oreca 07-Gibson	LMP2	297	15th	**1st**
2025	(United Kingdom) United Autosports	(United Kingdom) Ben Hanley (Brazil) Daniel Schneider	Oreca 07-Gibson	LMP2	363	28th	11th
2025	(United Kingdom) United Autosports	(United Kingdom) Ben Hanley (Brazil) Daniel Schneider	Oreca 07-Gibson	LMP2 Pro-Am	363	28th	6th
2026	(United Kingdom) United Autosports	(United Kingdom) Ben Hanley (Brazil) Daniel Schneider	Oreca 07-Gibson	LMP2	353	29th	15th
2026	(United Kingdom) United Autosports	(United Kingdom) Ben Hanley (Brazil) Daniel Schneider	Oreca 07-Gibson	LMP2 Pro-Am	353	29th	7th

=== Complete GT1 World Championship results ===
Year	Team	Car	1	2	3	4	5	6	7	8	9	10	11	12	13	14	15	16	17	18	Pos	Points
2012	Belgian Audi Club Team WRT	Audi R8 LMS ultra	NOG; QR; 2	NOG; CR; 2	ZOL; QR; 11	ZOL; CR; 10	NAV; QR; 8	NAV; QR; 8	SVK; QR; 6	SVK; CR; 5	ALG; QR; 3	ALG; CR; Ret	SVK; QR; Ret	SVK; CR; 4	MOS; QR; 3	MOS; CR; 3	NUR; QR; 7	NUR; CR; Ret	DON; QR; Ret	DON; CR; 7	8th	81

=== Complete FIA World Endurance Championship results ===
Year	Entrant	Class	Chassis	Engine	1	2	3	4	5	6	7	8	9	Rank	Points
2013	Audi Sport Team Joest	LMP1	Audi R18 e-tron quattro	Audi TDI 3.7L Turbo V6 (Hybrid Diesel)	SIL	SPA; 3	LMS; 3	SÃO	CTA	FUJ	SHA	BHR		9th	45
2014	Audi Sport Team Joest	LMP1	Audi R18 e-tron quattro	Audi TDI 4.0 L Turbo V6 (Hybrid Diesel)	SIL	SPA	LMS; Ret	COA	FUJ	SHA	BHR	SÃO		27th	0
2015	Audi Sport Team Joest	LMP1	Audi R18 e-tron quattro	Audi TDI 4.0 L Turbo V6 (Hybrid Diesel)	SIL; 5	SPA; 7	LMS; 4	NÜR; 4	COA; 3	FUJ; 4	SHA; 4	BHR; 6		4th	99
2016	Audi Sport Team Joest	LMP1	Audi R18	Audi TDI 4.0 L Turbo Diesel V6	SIL; Ret	SPA; 1	LMS; 3	NÜR; 2	**MEX**; 15	COA; 2	**FUJ**; 2	SHA; 5	**BHR**; 1	2nd	147.5
2017	Jackie Chan DC Racing	LMP2	Oreca 07	Gibson GK428 4.2 L V8	SIL; 1	SPA; 3	LMS; 1	**NÜR**; 1	MEX; 9	COA; 4	FUJ; 3	SHA; 4	BHR; 2	2nd	175
2019–20	Team LNT	LMP1	Ginetta G60-LT-P1	AER P60C 2.4 L Turbo V6	SIL; 12									22nd	6.5
2019–20	United Autosports	LMP2	Oreca 07	Gibson GL428 4.2 L V8		FUJ; 3	SHA	BHR	COA	SPA	LMS	BHR		15th	15
2022	United Autosports USA	LMP2	Oreca 07	Gibson GK428 4.2 L V8	SEB; 1	SPA; 6	LMS; 5	MNZ; 5	FUJ; 5	BHR; 2				3rd	113
2023	United Autosports	LMP2	Oreca 07	Gibson GK428 4.2 L V8	**SEB**; Ret	ALG; 1	**SPA**; 2	LMS; 6	MNZ; 4	FUJ; 4	**BHR**; 8			5th	92

=== Complete IMSA SportsCar Championship results ===
Year	Entrant	No.	Class	Chassis	Engine	1	2	3	4	5	6	7	8	9	10	11	Rank	Points	Ref
2014	Fall-Line Motorsports	46	GTD	Audi R8 LMS ultra	Audi 5.2L V10	DAY; 29	SEB	LGA	DET	WGL	MOS	IMS	ELK	VIR	COA	PET	158th	1	
2018	Mazda Team Joest	77	P	Mazda RT24-P	Mazda MZ-2.0T 2.0 L Turbo I4	DAY; 17	SEB; 8	LBH; 4	MDO; 3	DET; 9	WGL; 13	MOS; 6	ELK; 11	LGA; 9	PET; 2		8th	234	
2019	Mazda Team Joest	77	DPi	Mazda RT24-P	Mazda MZ-2.0T 2.0 L Turbo I4	**DAY**; 11	SEB; 11	LBH; 4	**MDO**; 2	DET; 10	WGL; 2	MOS; 1	ELK; 3	LGA; 6	PET; 6		5th	268	
2020	Mazda Team Joest	77	DPi	Mazda RT24-P	Mazda MZ-2.0T 2.0 L Turbo I4	**DAY**; 2											7th	247	
2020	Mazda Motorsports	77	DPi	Mazda RT24-P	Mazda MZ-2.0T 2.0 L Turbo I4		DAY; 2	SEB; 4	ELK; 6	ATL; 7	MDO; 5	PET; 7	LGA; 5	SEB; 3			7th	247	
2021	Mazda Motorsports	55	DPi	Mazda RT24-P	Mazda MZ-2.0T 2.0 L Turbo I4	DAY; 3	SEB; 2	**MDO**; 3	DET; 4	WGL; 1	WGL; 5	ELK; 2	LGA; 5	LBH; 5	**PET**; 1		3rd	3264	
2022	Meyer Shank Racing with Curb-Agajanian	60	DPi	Acura ARX-05	Acura AR35TT 3.5 L Turbo V6	DAY; 1	SEB; 5	LBH; 4	LGA; 2	MDO; 2	DET; 2	**WGL**; 2	**MOS**; 2	ELK; 4	**PET**; 1		1st	3432	
2023	Era Motorsport	18	LMP2	Oreca 07	Gibson GK428 4.2 L V8	DAY; 9	SEB	LGA	WGL	ELK	IMS	PET					NC†	0†	
2024	Pfaff Motorsports	9	GTD Pro	McLaren 720S GT3 Evo	McLaren M840T 4.0 L Turbo V8	DAY; 10	SEB; 12	LGA; 2	DET; 8	WGL; 2	MOS; 6	ELK; 7	VIR; 5	IMS; 10	PET; 9		7th	2689	
2025	United Autosports USA	2	LMP2	Oreca 07	Gibson GK428 4.2 L V8	DAY; 11	SEB	WGL	MOS	ELK							32nd	770	
2025	Era Motorsport	18	LMP2	Oreca 07	Gibson GK428 4.2 L V8						IMS; 12	PET; 3					32nd	770	
2026	Intersport Racing	37	LMP2	Oreca 07	Gibson GK428 4.2 L V8	DAY; 7	SEB; 10	WGL; 11	MOS	ELK; 12	IMS	PET; 7					24th	1182	

^{†} Points only counted towards the Michelin Endurance Cup, and not the overall LMP2 Championship.

=== Complete European Le Mans Series results ===
(key) (Races in bold indicate pole position; results in italics indicate fastest lap)

Year	Entrant	Class	Chassis	Engine	1	2	3	4	5	6	Rank	Points
2023	United Autosports USA	LMP2	Oreca 07	Gibson GK428 V8	CAT; 6	LEC; 7	**ARA**; 1	SPA; 5	POR; 1	ALG; 1	2nd	100
2024	United Autosports	LMP2 Pro-Am	Oreca 07	Gibson GK428 4.2 L V8	CAT; 7	LEC; 3	IMO; 7	SPA	MUG; 4	ALG; Ret	7th	39
2025	United Autosports	LMP2 Pro-Am	Oreca 07	Gibson GK428 4.2 L V8	CAT; 5	LEC; 5	IMO; 6	SPA; 2	SIL; 5	ALG; 7	7th	62
2026	United Autosports	LMP2 Pro-Am	Oreca 07	Gibson GK428 4.2 L V8	CAT; 7	LEC; 8	IMO; 3	SPA; 10	SIL; 2	ALG; 9	7th	46

Sporting positions
Preceded by Mike Conway	Formula Renault UK; Champion; 2005	Succeeded by Sebastian Hohenthal
Preceded by Mike Conway	Macau Grand Prix; Winner; 2007	Succeeded by Keisuke Kunimoto
Preceded by Felipe Nasr; Pipo Derani	IMSA SportsCar Championship; Champion; 2022; With: Tom Blomqvist	Succeeded by Pipo Derani; Alexander Sims
Preceded by Filipe Albuquerque; Ricky Taylor; Alexander Rossi	Michelin Endurance Cup; Champion; 2022; With: Tom Blomqvist	Succeeded by Pipo Derani; Alexander Sims; Jack Aitken
Awards
Preceded by Paul di Resta	McLaren Autosport BRDC Award; 2005	Succeeded by Oliver Turvey
