= 2006 Japanese Formula 3 Championship =

Seasons
- ← 2005 2007 →

The 2006 Japanese Formula 3 Championship was the 27th edition of the Japanese Formula 3 Championship. It began on 1 April at Fuji and ended on 22 October at Motegi. German driver Adrian Sutil took the championship title, winning five from eighteen races.

== Teams and drivers ==
- All teams were Japanese-registered. All cars used Bridgestone tyres.

Team	No	Driver	Chassis	Engine	Rounds
TOM'S	1	(Germany) Adrian Sutil	Dallara F305	Toyota-TOM'S 3S-GE	All
TOM'S	36	(Japan) Kazuya Oshima	Dallara F305	Toyota-TOM'S 3S-GE	All
TOM'S	37	(Japan) Hideto Yasuoka	Dallara F305	Toyota-TOM'S 3S-GE	1–5
TOM'S	37	(Japan) Hiroyuki Matsumura	Dallara F305	Toyota-TOM'S 3S-GE	7–9
Honda Toda Racing	2	(Japan) Takuya Izawa	Dome F107	Toda-Honda MF204C	All
Inging Motorsport	3	(New Zealand) Jonny Reid	Dallara F306	Torii-Toyota 3S-GE	All
Inging Motorsport	4	(Brazil) Roberto Streit	Dallara F306	Torii-Toyota 3S-GE	All
Honda Team M-TEC	10	(Japan) Koudai Tsukakoshi	Dome F107	Mugen-Honda MF204C	All
ThreeBond Racing	12	(Brazil) Fabio Carbone	Dallara F305	ThreeBond Nissan SR20VE	All
ThreeBond Racing	14	(Estonia) Marko Asmer	Dallara F305	ThreeBond Nissan SR20VE	All
Now Motor Sports	33	(Japan) Hiroaki Ishiura	Dallara F305	Toyota-TOM'S 3S-GE	All
Zap Speed	50	(Japan) Motohiko Isozaki	Dallara F305	Toyota-TOM'S 3S-GE	1–7, 9
Autosport with Le Beausset	62	(Japan) Koki Saga	Dallara F306	Toyota-TOM'S 3S-GE	All
Exceed Motorsports	74	(Japan) Satoru Okada	Dallara F306	Torii-Toyota 3S-GE	1–4, 6–9
Exceed Motorsports	74	(Japan) Wataru Kobayakawa	Dallara F306	Torii-Toyota 3S-GE	5
Exceed Motorsports	75	(Japan) Daisuke Ikeda	Dallara F306	Torii-Toyota 3S-GE	All

== Race calendar and results ==
Round		Circuit	Date	Pole position	Fastest lap	Winning driver	Winning team
1	R1	Fuji Speedway, Oyama	1 April	(Japan) Kazuya Oshima	(Japan) Kazuya Oshima	(Germany) Adrian Sutil	TOM'S
1	R2	Fuji Speedway, Oyama	2 April	(Japan) Kazuya Oshima	(Japan) Kazuya Oshima	(Japan) Kazuya Oshima	TOM'S
2	R1	Suzuka Circuit, Suzuka	15 April	(Brazil) Roberto Streit	(Brazil) Roberto Streit	(Brazil) Roberto Streit	Inging Motorsport
2	R2	Suzuka Circuit, Suzuka	16 April	(Brazil) Fabio Carbone	(Japan) Koudai Tsukakoshi	(Japan) Takuya Izawa	Honda Toda Racing
3	R1	Twin Ring Motegi, Motegi	27 May	(Japan) Koudai Tsukakoshi	(Brazil) Roberto Streit	(Brazil) Roberto Streit	Inging Motorsport
3	R2	Twin Ring Motegi, Motegi	28 May	(Germany) Adrian Sutil	(Germany) Adrian Sutil	(Germany) Adrian Sutil	TOM'S
4	R1	Okayama International Circuit	17 June	(Japan) Koudai Tsukakoshi	(Germany) Adrian Sutil	(Germany) Adrian Sutil	TOM'S
4	R2	Okayama International Circuit	18 June	(Germany) Adrian Sutil	(Germany) Adrian Sutil	(Germany) Adrian Sutil	TOM'S
5	R1	Suzuka Circuit, Suzuka	7 July	(Japan) Koudai Tsukakoshi	(Japan) Koudai Tsukakoshi	(Japan) Koudai Tsukakoshi	Honda Team M-TEC
5	R2	Suzuka Circuit, Suzuka	8 July	(Japan) Koudai Tsukakoshi	(Japan) Koudai Tsukakoshi	(Japan) Takuya Izawa	Honda Toda Racing
6	R1	Autopolis, Hita	5 August	(Japan) Kazuya Oshima	(Japan) Kazuya Oshima	(Japan) Kazuya Oshima	TOM'S
6	R2	Autopolis, Hita	6 August	(Japan) Kazuya Oshima	(Japan) Kazuya Oshima	(Brazil) Roberto Streit	Inging Motorsport
7	R1	Fuji Speedway, Oyama	26 August	(Japan) Koudai Tsukakoshi	(Japan) Kazuya Oshima	(Japan) Kazuya Oshima	TOM'S
7	R2	Fuji Speedway, Oyama	27 August	(Japan) Kazuya Oshima	(Brazil) Roberto Streit	(Germany) Adrian Sutil	TOM'S
8	R1	Sportsland SUGO, Murata	16 September	(Brazil) Fabio Carbone	(Germany) Adrian Sutil	(Brazil) Fabio Carbone	ThreeBond Racing
8	R2	Sportsland SUGO, Murata	17 September	(Brazil) Fabio Carbone	(Germany) Adrian Sutil	(Brazil) Fabio Carbone	ThreeBond Racing
9	R1	Twin Ring Motegi, Motegi	21 October	(Japan) Hiroaki Ishiura	(Brazil) Roberto Streit	(Japan) Hiroaki Ishiura	Now Motor Sports
9	R2	Twin Ring Motegi, Motegi	22 October	(Germany) Adrian Sutil	(Brazil) Roberto Streit	(Estonia) Marko Asmer	ThreeBond Racing

== Standings ==
- Points are awarded as follows:

1	2	3	4	5	6	7	8	9	10	PP	FL
20	15	12	10	8	6	4	3	2	1	**1**	1

Pos	Driver	FUJ		SUZ		MOT		OKA		SUZ		AUT		FUJ		SUG		MOT		Pts
1	(Germany) Adrian Sutil	1	4	5	3	3	**1**	1	**1**	3	3	6	3	Ret	1	3	2	Ret	**DSQ**	212
2	(Japan) Kazuya Oshima	**3**	**1**	2	6	5	6	8	Ret	Ret	4	**1**	**2**	1	**2**	2	4	Ret	DSQ	185
3	(Brazil) Roberto Streit	4	Ret	**1**	5	1	4	NC	8	4	7	2	1	4	3	4	3	5	3	182
4	(Brazil) Fabio Carbone	13	3	3	**2**	12	2	4	3	6	6	4	Ret	3	6	**1**	**1**	4	Ret	169
5	(Japan) Koudai Tsukakoshi	2	5	12	9	**7**	3	**2**	4	**1**	**2**	7	4	**13**	11	5	5	2	11	153
6	(Japan) Takuya Izawa	8	Ret	4	1	13	5	3	5	2	1	3	7	6	4	6	7	3	5	151
7	(Estonia) Marko Asmer	5	8	7	4	4	7	6	2	Ret	5	8	6	2	5	8	6	Ret	1	124
8	(New Zealand) Jonny Reid	6	2	6	10	2	Ret	10	Ret	7	Ret	5	5	5	7	9	12	Ret	4	88
9	(Japan) Hiroaki Ishiura	12	Ret	8	7	10	8	5	7	5	Ret	10	8	7	8	Ret	Ret	**1**	6	69
10	(Japan) Daisuke Ikeda	10	6	9	13	6	Ret	7	6	Ret	8	9	10	9	9	7	9	6	7	50
11	(Japan) Koki Saga	9	Ret	14	NC	9	10	9	10	11	9	11	9	8	10	10	8	7	2	39
12	(Japan) Hideto Yasuoka	7	Ret	11	8	8	9	Ret	Ret	8	Ret									15
13	(Japan) Satoru Okada	11	7	10	11	11	11	Ret	9			13	11	12	12	11	11	8	8	13
14	(Japan) Motohiko Isozaki	14	9	13	12	Ret	12	11	11	10	10	12	12	11	13			10	9	7
15	(Japan) Hiroyuki Matsumura													10	Ret	12	10	9	10	5
16	(Japan) Wataru Kobayakawa									9	Ret									2
Pos	Driver	FUJ		SUZ		MOT		OKA		SUZ		AUT		FUJ		SUG		MOT		Pts

Colour	Result
Gold	Winner
Silver	Second place
Bronze	Third place
Green	Points classification
Blue	Non-points classification
Blue	Non-classified finish (NC)
Purple	Retired, not classified (Ret)
Red	Did not qualify (DNQ)
Red	Did not pre-qualify (DNPQ)
Black	Disqualified (DSQ)
White	Did not start (DNS)
White	Withdrew (WD)
White	Race cancelled (C)
Blank	Did not practice (DNP)
Blank	Did not arrive (DNA)
Blank	Excluded (EX)

**Bold** – Pole
Italics – Fastest Lap
