= 2007 Japanese Formula 3 Championship =

Seasons
- ← 2006 2008 →

The 2007 Japanese Formula 3 Championship was the 28th edition of the Japanese Formula 3 Championship. It began on 31 March at Fuji and ended on 21 October at Motegi. Local driver Kazuya Oshima took the championship title, winning six from twenty races.

== Teams and drivers ==
- All teams were Japanese-registered. All cars were powered by Bridgestone tyres.

Team	No	Driver	Chassis (Note: All drivers competed in Dallara chassis; model listed.)	Engine	Rounds
TOM'S	1	(United Kingdom) Oliver Jarvis	F306	Toyota-TOM'S 1AZ-FE	All
TOM'S	36	(Japan) Kazuya Oshima	F306	Toyota-TOM'S 1AZ-FE	All
TOM'S	37	(Japan) Hiroaki Ishiura	F307	Toyota-TOM'S 3S-GE	All
Honda Toda Racing	2	(Japan) Yuhki Nakayama	F307	Toda-Honda MF204C	All
Inging Motorsport	3	(Brazil) Roberto Streit	F306	Torii-Toyota 3S-GE	All
Honda Team Real	10	(Japan) Koudai Tsukakoshi	F307	Mugen-Honda MF204C	All
Honda Team Real	11	(Japan) Takuya Izawa	F307	Mugen-Honda MF204C	All
ThreeBond Racing	12	(Estonia) Marko Asmer	F307	ThreeBond Nissan SR20VE	1–2, 4–5
ThreeBond Racing	12	(United Kingdom) Ben Clucas	F307	ThreeBond Nissan SR20VE	3
ThreeBond Racing	12	(Japan) Taku Bamba	F307	ThreeBond Nissan SR20VE	6–7
ThreeBond Racing	14	(Japan) Hironobu Yasuda	F306	ThreeBond Nissan SR20VE	All
Shion Formula Ltd.	16	(Japan) Motoaki Ishikawa	F306	Toyota-TOM'S 3S-GE	All
Now Motor Sports	33	(Japan) Yuhi Sekiguchi	F305	Toyota-TOM'S 3S-GE	All
Denso Team Le Beausset	62	(Japan) Koki Saga	F306	Toyota-TOM'S 3S-GE	All

== Race calendar and results ==
Round		Circuit	Date	Pole position	Fastest lap	Winning driver	Winning team
1	R1	Fuji Speedway, Oyama	31 March	(Japan) Kazuya Oshima	(United Kingdom) Oliver Jarvis	(United Kingdom) Oliver Jarvis	TOM'S
1	R2	Fuji Speedway, Oyama	1 April	(Japan) Kazuya Oshima	(Japan) Kazuya Oshima	(Japan) Kazuya Oshima	TOM'S
2	R1	Suzuka Circuit, Suzuka	14 April	(Japan) Kazuya Oshima	(Japan) Kazuya Oshima	(Japan) Kazuya Oshima	TOM'S
2	R2	Suzuka Circuit, Suzuka	15 April	(Brazil) Roberto Streit	(Japan) Kazuya Oshima	(Brazil) Roberto Streit	Inging Motorsport
3	R1	Twin Ring Motegi, Motegi	19 May	(Japan) Koudai Tsukakoshi	(United Kingdom) Oliver Jarvis	(United Kingdom) Oliver Jarvis	TOM'S
3	R2	Twin Ring Motegi, Motegi	20 May	(United Kingdom) Oliver Jarvis	(United Kingdom) Oliver Jarvis	(Brazil) Roberto Streit	Inging Motorsport
4	R1	Okayama International Circuit	9 June	(Japan) Hiroaki Ishiura	(Japan) Hiroaki Ishiura	(Japan) Hiroaki Ishiura	TOM'S
4	R2	Okayama International Circuit	10 June	(Japan) Hiroaki Ishiura	(Japan) Koudai Tsukakoshi	(Japan) Koudai Tsukakoshi	TOM'S
5	R1	Suzuka Circuit, Suzuka	7 July	(Brazil) Roberto Streit	(Japan) Koudai Tsukakoshi	(Brazil) Roberto Streit	Inging Motorsport
5	R2	Suzuka Circuit, Suzuka	8 July	(Japan) Koudai Tsukakoshi	(Japan) Kazuya Oshima	(Japan) Koudai Tsukakoshi	Honda Team Real
6	R1	Autopolis, Hita	4 August	(Brazil) Roberto Streit	(Japan) Kazuya Oshima	(Brazil) Roberto Streit	Inging Motorsport
6	R2	Autopolis, Hita	5 August	(Japan) Kazuya Oshima	(Japan) Hiroaki Ishiura	(Brazil) Roberto Streit	Inging Motorsport
6	R3	Autopolis, Hita	5 August	(Japan) Kazuya Oshima	(Japan) Kazuya Oshima	(Japan) Kazuya Oshima	TOM'S
7	R1	Fuji Speedway, Oyama	25 August	(Japan) Kazuya Oshima	(Japan) Kazuya Oshima	(Japan) Kazuya Oshima	TOM'S
7	R2	Fuji Speedway, Oyama	26 August	(Japan) Kazuya Oshima	(Japan) Kazuya Oshima	(Japan) Kazuya Oshima	TOM'S
8	R1	Sendai Hi-Land Raceway, Aoba-ku	6 October	(Brazil) Roberto Streit	(Brazil) Roberto Streit	(Brazil) Roberto Streit	Inging Motorsport
8	R2	Sendai Hi-Land Raceway, Aoba-ku	7 October	(United Kingdom) Oliver Jarvis	(United Kingdom) Oliver Jarvis	(United Kingdom) Oliver Jarvis	TOM'S
8	R3	Sendai Hi-Land Raceway, Aoba-ku	7 October	(Japan) Hiroaki Ishiura	(Japan) Hiroaki Ishiura	(Japan) Hiroaki Ishiura	TOM'S
9	R1	Twin Ring Motegi, Motegi	20 October	(Brazil) Roberto Streit	(Japan) Kazuya Oshima	(Brazil) Roberto Streit	Inging Motorsport
9	R2	Twin Ring Motegi, Motegi	21 October	(Japan) Kazuya Oshima	(Japan) Kazuya Oshima	(Japan) Kazuya Oshima	TOM'S

== Standings ==
- Points are awarded as follows:

1	2	3	4	5	6	7	8	9	10	PP	FL
20	15	12	10	8	6	4	3	2	1	**1**	1

Pos	Driver	FUJ		SUZ		MOT		OKA		SUZ		AUT			FUJ		SEN			MOT		Pts
1	(Japan) Kazuya Oshima	3	**1**	**1**	4	6	9	7	2	2	3	3	**2**	**1**	**1**	**1**	Ret	3	Ret	2	**1**	262
2	(Brazil) Roberto Streit	4	2	3	**1**	2	1	4	3	**1**	4	**1**	1	6	5	4	**1**	4	3	**1**	5	252
3	(United Kingdom) Oliver Jarvis	1	3	2	3	1	5	2	5	4	2	2	3	2	3	3	3	**1**	2	3	Ret	238
4	(Japan) Hiroaki Ishiura	2	4	4	2	4	2	**1**	**7**	10	8	6	11	4	6	5	2	2	**1**	4	3	201
5	(Japan) Koudai Tsukakoshi	7	5	5	6	**3**	4	3	1	3	**1**	5	5	Ret	2	2	6	8	4	5	8	182
6	(Japan) Takuya Izawa	Ret	8	7	8	5	3	5	4	9	6	4	4	3	4	6	Ret	5	7	Ret	6	120
7	(Japan) Yuhi Sekiguchi	5	9	6	7	7	7	6	6	7	5	7	6	5	8	12	Ret	6	5	7	2	101
8	(Japan) Hironobu Yasuda	8	7	Ret	9	9	8	8	10	5	7	8	7	10	7	7	4	10	6	6	4	76
9	(Japan) Yuhki Nakayama	Ret	DNS	10	11	10	Ret	10	11	8	9	9	8	7	11	9	5	7	Ret	7	7	35
10	(Estonia) Marko Asmer	6	6	9	5			11	8	6	Ret											31
11	(Japan) Koki Saga	9	10	8	10	11	10	9	9	12	10	10	10	8	10	10	7	9	8	8	Ret	31
12	(Japan) Motoaki Ishikawa	10	11	11	12	12	11	12	12	11	11	12	Ret	11	12	11	8	11	9	9	9	10
13	(United Kingdom) Ben Clucas					8	6															9
14	(Japan) Taku Bamba											11	9	9	9	8						9
Pos	Driver	FUJ		SUZ		MOT		OKA		SUZ		AUT			FUJ		SEN			MOT		Pts

Colour	Result
Gold	Winner
Silver	Second place
Bronze	Third place
Green	Points classification
Blue	Non-points classification
Blue	Non-classified finish (NC)
Purple	Retired, not classified (Ret)
Red	Did not qualify (DNQ)
Red	Did not pre-qualify (DNPQ)
Black	Disqualified (DSQ)
White	Did not start (DNS)
White	Withdrew (WD)
White	Race cancelled (C)
Blank	Did not practice (DNP)
Blank	Did not arrive (DNA)
Blank	Excluded (EX)

**Bold** – Pole
Italics – Fastest Lap
