= Takuya Izawa =

Japanese racing driver

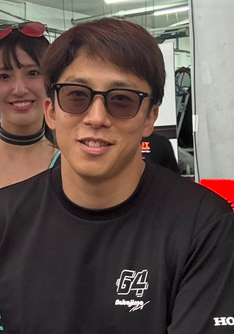
- Izawa at the 2025 Super GT Malaysia Festival
- Nationality: (Japan) Japanese
- Born: 1 June 1984 (age 42) Tokyo, Japan

Super GT - GT500 career
- Debut season: 2007
- Current team: Nakajima Racing
- Car number: 64
- Former teams: Real Racing, ARTA, Team Kunimitsu, Dome Racing
- Starts: 139
- Championships: 0
- Wins: 7
- Podiums: 29
- Poles: 8
- Fastest laps: 7
- Best finish: 2nd in 2009

Previous series
- 2008–18 2006–07 2002–04: Formula Nippon/Super Formula; All-Japan Formula 3 Formula Renault 2.0 Germany

Takuya Izawa (伊沢拓也, Izawa Takuya; born 1 June 1984 in Tokyo) is a Japanese racing driver currently competing in Super GT for Nakajima Racing. He is a race winner in the Super Formula and Super GT championships, as well as a podium finisher in the GP2 Series.

Izawa has also competed in the World Touring Car Championship.

== Racing record ==
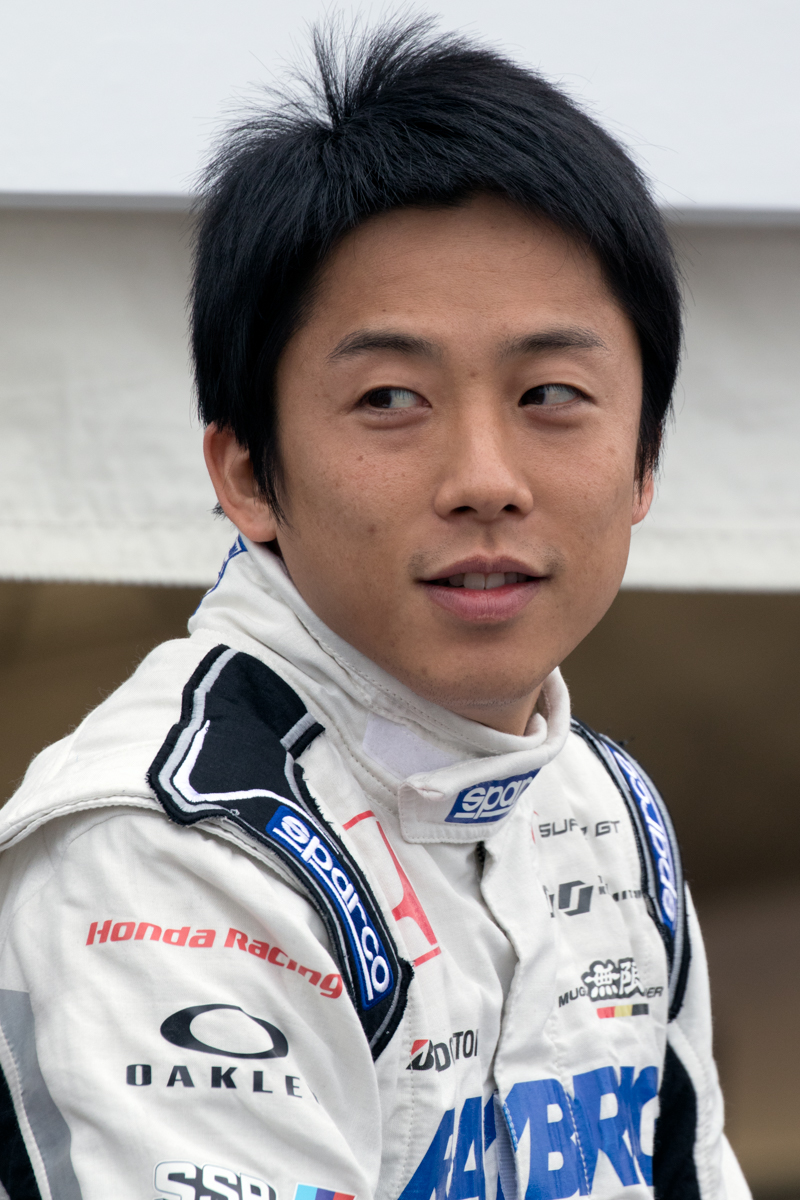
Izawa in 2015

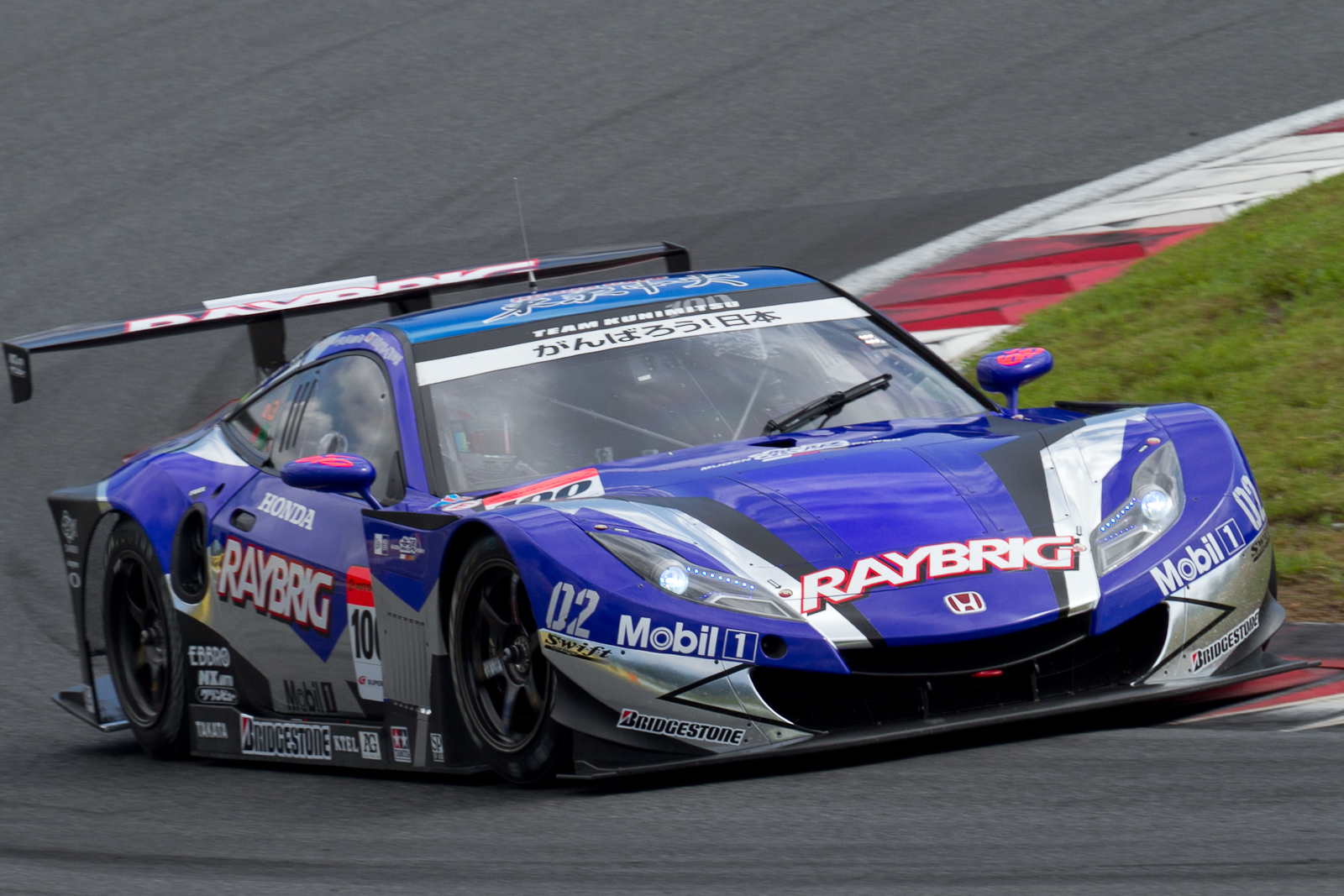
Izawa driving the Honda HSV-010 GT for Team Kunimitsu in 2011.

=== Complete Japanese Formula 3 Championship results ===
(key) (Races in bold indicate pole position) (Races in italics indicate fastest lap)

Year	Team	Engine	1	2	3	4	5	6	7	8	9	10	11	12	13	14	15	16	17	18	19	20	DC	Pts
2006	Honda Toda Racing	Toda	FUJ; 1; 8	FUJ; 2 Ret	SUZ; 1; 4	SUZ; 2; 1	MOT; 1; 13	MOT; 2; 5	OKA; 1; 3	OKA; 2; 5	SUZ; 1; 2	SUZ; 2; 1	AUT; 1; 3	AUT; 2; 7	FUJ; 1; 6	FUJ; 2; 4	SUG; 1; 6	SUG; 2; 7	MOT; 1; 3	MOT; 2; 5			6th	151
2007	Honda Team Real	Mugen	FUJ; 1 Ret	FUJ; 2; 8	SUZ; 1; 7	SUZ; 2; 8	MOT; 1; 5	MOT; 2; 3	OKA; 1; 5	OKA; 2; 4	SUZ; 1; 9	SUZ; 2; 6	AUT; 1; 4	AUT; 2; 4	AUT; 3; 3	FUJ; 1; 4	FUJ; 2; 6	SEN; 1 Ret	SEN; 2; 5	SEN; 3; 7	MOT; 1 Ret	MOT; 2; 6	6th	120

=== Complete Super GT results ===
Year	Team	Car	Class	1	2	3	4	5	6	7	8	9	DC	Points
2007	Rolling Stone Real Racing	Honda NSX	GT500	SUZ	OKA	FUJ	SEP	SUG	SUZ; 5	MOT	AUT	FUJ	22nd	6
2008	Autobacs Racing Team Aguri	Honda NSX	GT500	SUZ; 14	OKA; 3	FUJ; Ret	SEP; 11	SUG; 15	SUZ; 13	MOT; 2	AUT; 3	FUJ; 12	8th	49
2009	Autobacs Racing Team Aguri	Honda NSX	GT500	OKA; 3	SUZ; 14	FUJ; 3	SEP; 3	SUG; 14	SUZ; 12	FUJ; 1	AUT; 4	MOT; 1	**2nd**	**81**
2010	Team Kunimitsu	Honda HSV-010 GT	GT500	SUZ; 3	OKA; 8	FUJ; 10	SEP; 5	SUG; 8	SUZ; 3	FUJ; C	MOT; 6		8th	40
2011	Team Kunimitsu	Honda HSV-010 GT	GT500	OKA; 2	FUJ; 12	SEP; 7	SUG; 7	SUZ; Ret	FUJ; 5	AUT; 14	MOT; 4		9th	37
2012	Team Kunimitsu	Honda HSV-010 GT	GT500	OKA; 2	FUJ; 2	SEP; 6	SUG; 8	SUZ; 11	FUJ; 12	AUT; 8	MOT; 9		5th	43
2013	Team Kunimitsu	Honda HSV-010 GT	GT500	OKA; 1	FUJ; 7	SEP; 3	SUG; 12	SUZ; 10	FUJ; Ret	AUT; 12	MOT; 12		10th	37
2014	Weider Modulo Dome Racing	Honda NSX Concept-GT	GT500	OKA	FUJ	AUT	SUG	FUJ	SUZ	BUR	MOT; 3		18th	11
2015	Team Kunimitsu	Honda NSX Concept-GT	GT500	OKA; 2	FUJ; Ret	CHA; Ret	FUJ; 5	SUZ; 5	SUG; 1	AUT; 11	MOT; 3		3rd	60
2016	Team Kunimitsu	Honda NSX Concept-GT	GT500	OKA; 10	FUJ; Ret	SUG; 10	FUJ; 3	SUZ; 7	CHA; 10	MOT; 10	MOT; 12		14th	20
2017	Team Kunimitsu	Honda NSX-GT	GT500	OKA; Ret	FUJ; 6	**AUT**; 3	SUG; 9	FUJ; 8	SUZ; 3	CHA; 7	MOT; 5		7th	45
2018	Autobacs Racing Team Aguri	Honda NSX-GT	GT500	OKA; 11	FUJ; 8	**SUZ**; 1	CHA; Ret	FUJ; 4	SUG; 2	**AUT**; 12	**MOT**; 1		3rd	71
2019	ARTA	Honda NSX-GT	GT500	OKA; 1‡	FUJ; 9	SUZ; 4	CHA; Ret	FUJ; 7	AUT; 5	SUG; 12	MOT; 13		10th	31
2020	Modulo Nakajima Racing	Honda NSX-GT	GT500	FUJ; 13	FUJ; 13	**SUZ**; 4	MOT; 10	FUJ; 13	SUZ; 6	**MOT**; 2	FUJ; 11		12th	31
2021	Modulo Nakajima Racing	Honda NSX-GT	GT500	OKA; 13	FUJ; 10	MOT; Ret	**SUZ**; Ret	SUG; 8	AUT; 12	MOT; 13	FUJ; 12		18th	5
2022	Modulo Nakajima Racing	Honda NSX-GT	GT500	OKA; 15	FUJ; 11	SUZ; 11	FUJ; 11	SUZ; 12	SUG; 7	AUT; 13	MOT; 12		15th	4
2023	Modulo Nakajima Racing	Honda NSX-GT	GT500	OKA; 10	FUJ; 14	SUZ; 14	FUJ; 2	SUZ; 8	SUG; 11	AUT; 11	MOT; Ret		14th	19
2024	Modulo Nakajima Racing	Honda Civic Type R-GT GT500	GT500	OKA; 10	FUJ; 12	SUZ; 13	FUJ; 6	SUG; 14	AUT; Ret	**MOT**; 10	SUZ; 13		13th	11
2025	Modulo Nakajima Racing	Honda Civic Type R-GT GT500	GT500	OKA; 9	FUJ; 13	SEP; 10	FS1; 14	FS2 (8)	SUZ; 7	SUG; Ret	AUT; 2	MOT; 12	13th	23.5

^{‡} Half points awarded as less than 75% of race distance was completed.
^{(Number)} Driver did not take part in this sprint race, points are still awarded for the teammate's result.

=== Complete Formula Nippon/Super Formula results ===
(key) (Races in bold indicate pole position) (Races in italics indicate fastest lap)

Year	Team	Engine	1	2	3	4	5	6	7	8	9	10	11	DC	Points
2008	Autobacs Racing Team Aguri	Honda	FUJ; Ret	SUZ; 9	MOT; 4	OKA; 5	SUZ; 12	SUZ; Ret	MOT; Ret	MOT; 12	FUJ; 18	FUJ; 17	SUG; 8	10th	19
2009	Docomo Team Dandelion Racing	Honda	FUJ; 2	SUZ; 7	MOT; DNS	FUJ; Ret	SUZ; 8	MOT; 9	AUT; 6	SUG; 11				8th	14
2010	Docomo Team Dandelion Racing	Honda	SUZ; 5	MOT; 11	FUJ; 9	MOT; 11	SUG; 6	AUT; Ret	SUZ; 11	SUZ; 11				11th	7
2011	Docomo Team Dandelion Racing	Honda	SUZ; 4	AUT; 6	FUJ; 10	MOT; 6	SUZ; C	SUG; DSQ	MOT; Ret	MOT; 10				9th	11
2012	Docomo Team Dandelion Racing	Honda	**SUZ**; 6	MOT; 4	AUT; 2	FUJ; 13	MOT; 5	**SUG**; 1	SUZ; 1	SUZ; 6				**3rd**	**41.5**
2013	Docomo Team Dandelion Racing	Honda	**SUZ**; 1	AUT; Ret	FUJ; 5	MOT; Ret	SUG; Ret	SUZ; 10	SUZ; 9					7th	15
2014	Drago Corse	Honda	SUZ	FUJ	FUJ	FUJ	MOT	AUT	SUG; Ret	SUZ; 14	SUZ; 14			21st	0
2015	Real Racing	Honda	SUZ; 7	OKA; 7	FUJ; 11	MOT; 10	AUT; 12	SUG; Ret	SUZ; 8	SUZ; 15				13th	4.5
2016	Real Racing	Honda	SUZ; Ret	OKA; 3	FUJ; 11	MOT; 14	OKA; 16	OKA; 8	SUG; 13	SUZ; 16	SUZ; Ret			16th	3.5
2017	Docomo Team Dandelion Racing	Honda	SUZ; 8	OKA; 14	OKA; Ret	FUJ; 6	MOT; Ret	AUT; 15	SUG; 8	SUZ; C	SUZ; C			13th	5
2018	TCS Nakajima Racing	Honda	SUZ; 5	AUT; C	SUG; 14	FUJ; 15	MOT; 14	OKA; 14	SUZ; 16					16th	4

=== Complete World Touring Car Championship results ===
(key) (Races in bold indicate pole position) (Races in italics indicate fastest lap)

Year	Team	Car	1	2	3	4	5	6	7	8	9	10	11	12	13	14	15	16	17	18	19	20	21	22	23	24	Pos	Pts
2013	Honda Racing Team JAS	Honda Civic WTCC	ITA; 1	ITA; 2	MAR; 1	MAR; 2	SVK; 1	SVK; 2	HUN; 1	HUN; 2	AUT; 1	AUT; 2	RUS; 1	RUS; 2	POR; 1	POR; 2	ARG; 1	ARG; 2	USA; 1	USA; 2	JPN; 1; 12	JPN; 2; 22†	CHN; 1	CHN; 2	MAC; 1	MAC; 2	NC	0

=== Complete GP2 Series results ===
(key) (Races in bold indicate pole position) (Races in italics indicate fastest lap)

Year	Entrant	1	2	3	4	5	6	7	8	9	10	11	12	13	14	15	16	17	18	19	20	21	22	DC	Points
2014	ART Grand Prix	BHR; FEA; 6	BHR; SPR; 12	CAT; FEA; 20	CAT; SPR; 13	MON; FEA; Ret	MON; SPR; Ret	RBR; FEA; 9	RBR; SPR; 8	SIL; FEA; 16	SIL; SPR; 23†	HOC; FEA; 13	HOC; SPR; 19	HUN; FEA; 3	HUN; SPR; 21†	SPA; FEA; 16	SPA; SPR; 22	MNZ; FEA; Ret	MNZ; SPR; 14	SOC; FEA; 20	SOC; SPR; 22	YMC; FEA; 13	YMC; SPR; 10	18th	26

† Driver did not finish the race, but was classified as he completed over 90% of the race distance.
