= Kazuya Oshima =

Japanese racing driver

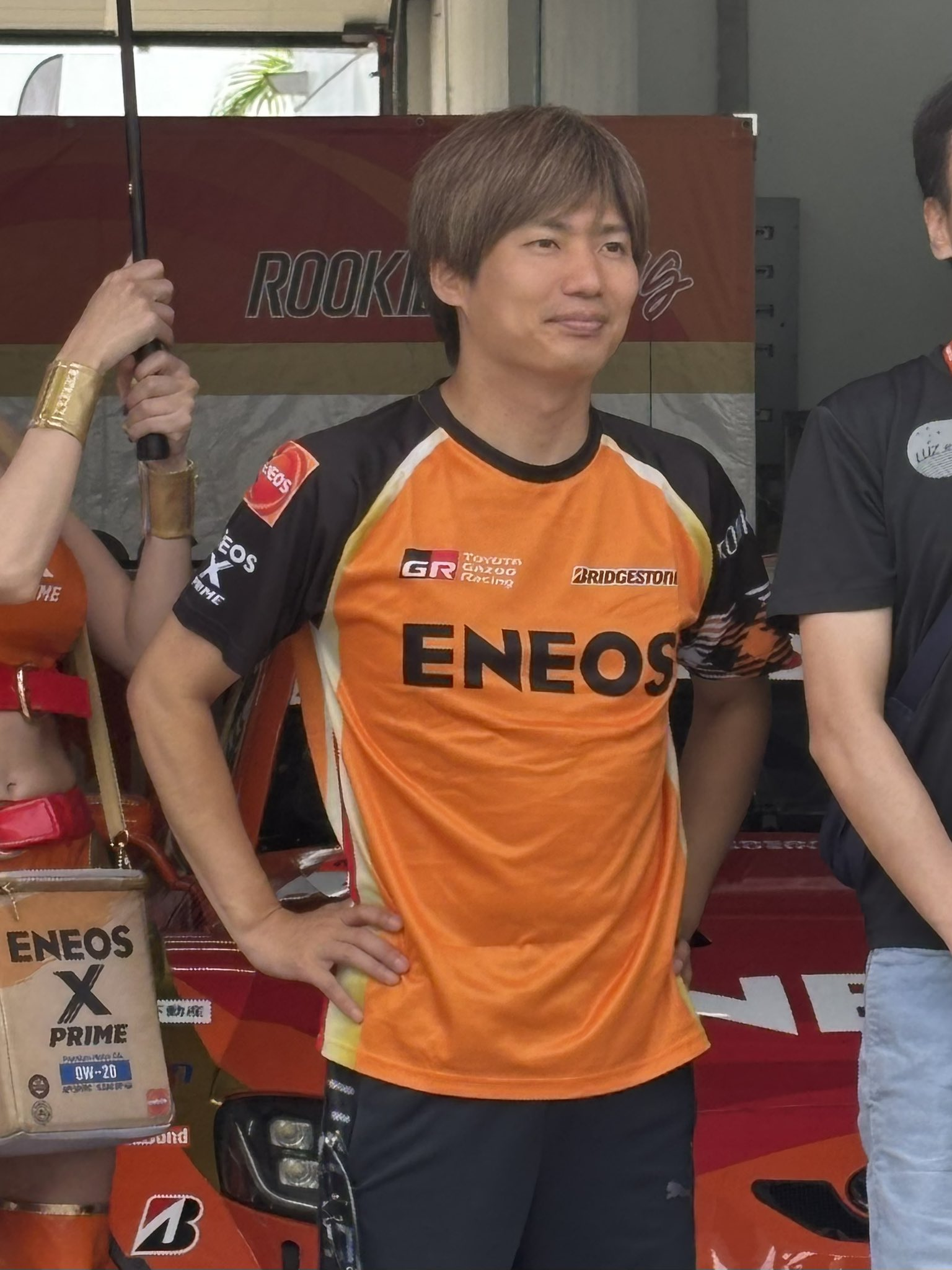
- Oshima at the 2025 Super GT Malaysia Festival
- Nationality: (Japan) Japanese
- Born: 30 April 1987 (age 39) Tomioka, Gunma, Japan

Super GT - GT500 career
- Debut season: 2015
- Current team: ROOKIE Racing
- Categorisation: FIA Platinum
- Car number: 14
- Former teams: Team Kraft, Team LeMans
- Starts: 107
- Wins: 8
- Podiums: 28
- Poles: 9
- Best finish: 1st in 2019
- Former teams: TOM'S, Team LeMans
- Starts: 99
- Wins: 1
- Podiums: 6
- Poles: 1
- Best finish: 5th in 2011

Previous series
- 2009–2025 2008 2007–2009 2006–2007: Super Formula; Formula 3 Euro Series; Super GT - GT300; Japanese Formula 3 Championship

Championship titles
- 2019 2007 2007: Super GT - GT500; Super GT - GT300; Japanese Formula 3 Championship

Kazuya Oshima (大嶋和也, Ōshima Kazuya; born April 30, 1987) is a Japanese racing driver, currently racing in the Super GT Series for TGR Team Rookie Racing. Oshima is one of only three drivers that have won championships in both classes of Super GT, having won the GT300 Drivers' Championship in 2007, and the GT500 Drivers' Championship in 2019.

Until 2025, Oshima raced in the Super Formula Championship for Rookie Racing. He also won the 2009 Suzuka Summer Endurance race. Outside of Japan, he is a five-time class winner at the Nürburgring 24 Hours (2010, 2012, 2014, 2015, 2016) as a member of Gazoo Racing/Toyota Gazoo Racing.

== Career ==
=== Junior career ===
Oshima made his formula series debut in 2005 at Formula Toyota where he won the title. Then he jumped to Japanese Formula 3 Championship with TOM'S. He competed for two seasons, and in 2006, he clinched runners up just lose out to the champion Adrian Sutil, while he managed to get seventh in Macau GP. Then he won the 2007 All-Japan Formula 3 Championship, also finished third in the 2007 Macau Grand Prix Formula 3 race. Then for 2008, Oshima also competed in the 2008 Formula 3 Euro Series with Manor Motorsports as a member of the Toyota Young Driver Program (TDP).

=== Super GT ===
==== GT300 ====
Oshima made his GT300 debut with APR, with Minoru Tanaka in 2006. He then won the title in 2007 with APR alongside Hiroaki Ishiura. For 2008, he made a one-off appearance with APR.

==== GT500 ====
Oshima returns to Japan in 2009, and he stepped into GT500 with Team Kraft alongside his former GT300 Champion teammate Ishiura. He racef there for two seasons where he won two races in each year. After that he moves to Team LeMans to pair with Daisuke Ito for two years, where both pairs only get one win in 2012. Then he paired with Yuji Kunimoto for over three years. From 2016 & 2017, his new teammate Andrea Caldarelli with him clinched runners up, and third place in 16 and 17. Then Oshima paired with Felix Rosenqvist for one season. In 2019 Oshina alongside Kenta Yamashita won the title against the KeePer TOM'S of Ryo Hirakawa and Nick Cassidy.

After won the title, Team LeMans left the series. And Oshima moves to the new entrant Rookie Racing with new teammate Sho Tsuboi. Then he is the mainstay of Rookie Racing, where he paired again with Kenta Yamashita for 2022 & 2023 where they won one race each season. Oshima then paired with former Honda driver Nirei Fukuzumi for 2024.

=== Super Formula ===
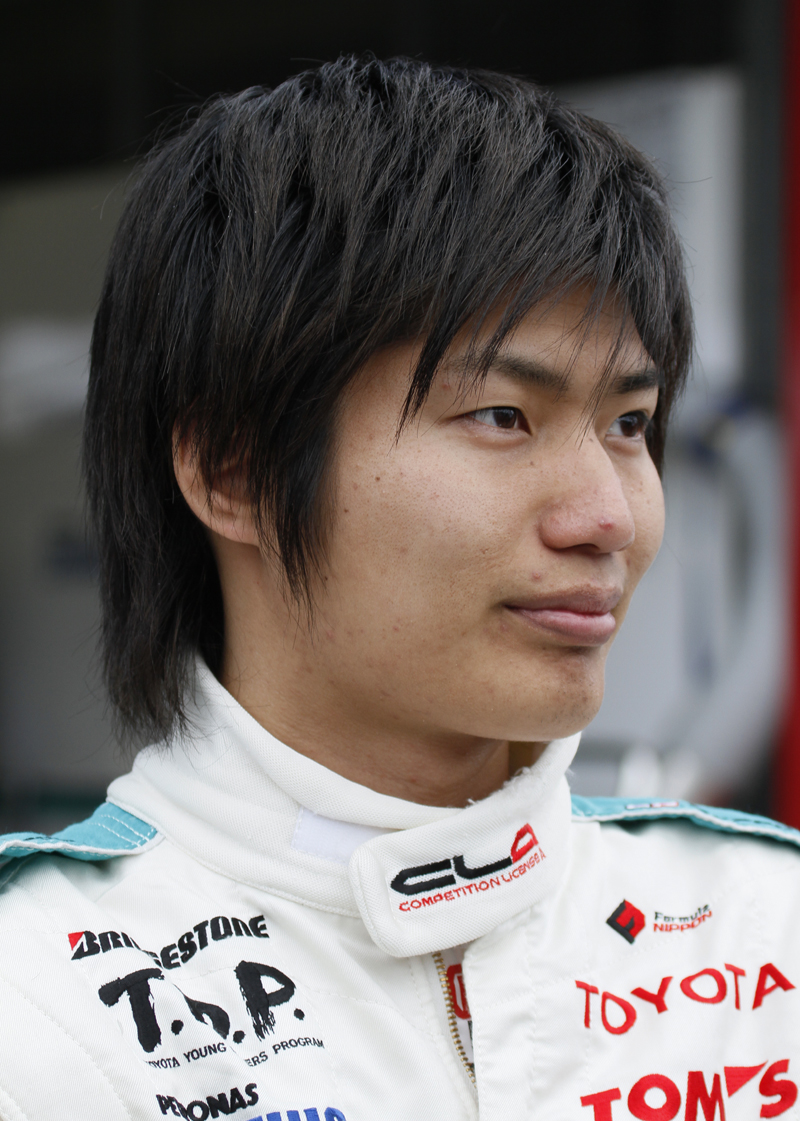
Oshima at the first Motegi round of the 2010 Formula Nippon season.

Oshima made his Formula Nippon debut in 2009 after return from unsuccessful season in Europe, where he moves to Petronas TOM'S for two seasons. In 2010, he won a race. Then in 2011, he moved to Team LeMans for two seasons. After that, he did not compete in the series for four seasons, except one-off appearance in 2015 as he replaced Kazuki Nakajima for one race. Oshima came back to the rebranded Super Formula, as he returned to his former Team LeMans to race for three seasons. After Team LeMans stopped their operation in Super GT & Super Formula, Oshima moved to Rookie Racing. Oshima then stayed with the team for five seasons.

== Racing record ==
=== Career summary ===
Season	Series	Team	Races	Wins	Poles	FLaps	Podiums	Points	Position
2005	Asian Formula Renault Challenge	Asia Racing Team	1	0	0	0	1	0	NC†
2005	Formula Toyota Series	TDP Scholarship	11	3	2	?	9	155	**1st**
2006	Japanese Formula 3 Championship	TOM'S	18	3	5	5	8	185	**2nd**
2006	Macau Grand Prix	TOM'S	1	0	0	0	0	N/A	7th
2006	Super GT Series - GT300	apr	9	0	1	?	0	28	15th
2007	Japanese Formula 3 Championship	TOM'S	20	6	8	10	14	262	**1st**
2007	Macau Grand Prix	TOM'S	1	0	0	0	1	N/A	**3rd**
2007	Super GT - GT300	apr	9	2	1	?	5	89	**1st**
2008	Formula 3 Euro Series	Manor Motorsport	20	1	0	0	1	7	19th
2008	Masters of Formula 3	Manor Motorsport	1	0	0	0	0	N/A	20th
2008	Macau Grand Prix	Manor Motorsport	1	0	0	0	0	N/A	16th
2008	Super GT - GT300	apr	1	0	0	0	1	17	22nd
2009	Super GT - GT500	Lexus Team Kraft	9	1	1	0	1	44	9th
2009	Formula Nippon	Petronas Team TOM'S	8	0	0	0	1	13	9th
2010	Super GT - GT500	Lexus Team Kraft	7	1	1	1	1	45	6th
2010	Formula Nippon	Petronas Team TOM'S	7	1	1	0	1	24	6th
2011	Super GT - GT500	Lexus Team LeMans ENEOS	8	0	0	0	1	28	11th
2011	Formula Nippon	Team LeMans	7	0	1	0	1	19	5th
2011	24 Hours of Nürburgring - SP8	Gazoo Racing	1	0	0	0	0	N/A	4th
2012	Super GT - GT500	Lexus Team LeMans ENEOS	8	1	0	0	2	33	10th
2012	Formula Nippon	Team LeMans	8	0	0	0	1	21.5	7th
2013	Super GT - GT500	Lexus Team LeMans ENEOS	8	1	1	1	2	52	5th
2014	Super GT - GT500	Lexus Team LeMans ENEOS	8	0	1	0	2	44	7th
2014	24 Hours of Nürburgring - SP8	Gazoo Racing	1	1	?	?	1	N/A	**1st**
2015	Super GT - GT500	Lexus Team LeMans ENEOS	8	0	0	0	1	32	9th
2015	Super Formula	Petronas Team TOM'S	1	0	0	0	0	0	20th
2015	24 Hours of Nürburgring - SP-Pro	Team Toyota Gazoo Racing	1	1	?	?	1	N/A	**1st**
2016	Super GT - GT500	Lexus Team LeMans Wako's	8	0	1	0	2	69	**2nd**
2016	24 Hours of Nürburgring - SP-Pro	Toyota Gazoo Racing with Tom's	1	1	?	?	1	N/A	**1st**
2016	24 Hours of Nürburgring - SP8	Toyota Gazoo Racing	1	0	?	?	0	N/A	DNF
2017	Super GT - GT500	Lexus Team LeMans Wako's	8	0	0	1	4	63	**3rd**
2017	Super Formula	Sunoco Team LeMans	7	0	0	0	1	6	12th
2018	Super GT - GT500	Lexus Team LeMans Wako's	8	0	0	0	1	41	10th
2018	Super Formula	UOMO Sunoco Team LeMans	6	0	0	0	0	6	12th
2019	Super GT - GT500	Lexus Team LeMans Wako's	8	2	1	0	4	85	**1st**
2019	Super Formula	UOMO Sunoco Team LeMans	7	0	0	0	1	7	14th
2020	Super GT - GT500	TGR Team Wako's ROOKIE	8	0	0	0	3	47	7th
2020	Super Formula	ROOKIE Racing	7	0	0	0	0	5	19th
2021	Super GT - GT500	TGR Team Eneos ROOKIE	8	1	1	1	3	52	5th
2021	Super Formula	NTT Communications ROOKIE	7	0	0	0	0	2.5	19th
2021	Super Taikyu - ST-Q	ROOKIE Racing						N/A‡	NC‡
2022	Super GT - GT500	TGR Team Eneos ROOKIE	8	1	1	0	2	49	5th
2022	Super Formula	docomo Business ROOKIE	10	0	0	1	0	0	21st
2022	Super Taikyu - ST-Q	ORC ROOKIE Racing						N/A‡	NC‡
2023	Super GT - GT500	TGR Team Eneos ROOKIE	7	0	0	0	1	45	7th
2023	Super Formula	docomo business ROOKIE	9	0	0	0	0	13	14th
2023	Super Taikyu - ST-Q	ORC ROOKIE Racing	5	1	2	2	5	N/A‡	NC‡
2024	Super Formula	docomo business ROOKIE	9	0	0	0	0	0	19th
2024	Super GT - GT500	TGR Team Eneos ROOKIE	8	0	0	0	1	38	11th
2024	Super Taikyu - ST-Q	ORC ROOKIE Racing	5	0	1	0	1	N/A‡	NC‡
2025	Super GT - GT500	TGR Team ENEOS ROOKIE	8	1	2	1	3	54.5	4th
2025	Super Formula	docomo business ROOKIE	12	0	0	0	0	19	14th
2025	Super Taikyu - ST-Q	Toyota Gazoo Rookie Racing						N/A‡	NC‡
2025	Nürburgring Langstrecken-Serie - SP8T	TOYOTA GAZOO ROOKIE Racing							
2026	Super GT - GT500	TGR Team ENEOS ROOKIE	8	0	1	1	1	37	10th
2026	Super Taikyu - ST-Q	Toyota Gazoo Rookie Racing						N/A‡	NC‡
2026	Nürburgring Langstrecken-Serie - SP2T	Toyota Gazoo Rookie Racing							

^{*} Season still in progress.
‡ Team standings

=== Complete Japanese Formula 3 results ===
(key) (Races in bold indicate pole position) (Races in italics indicate fastest lap)

Year	Team	Engine	1	2	3	4	5	6	7	8	9	10	11	12	13	14	15	16	17	18	19	20	DC	Pts
2006	TDP Team TOM'S	Toyota	**FUJ**; **1**; 3	**FUJ**; **2**; 1	SUZ; 1; 2	SUZ; 2; 6	MOT; 1; 5	MOT; 2; 6	OKA; 1; 8	OKA; 2 Ret	SUZ; 1 Ret	SUZ; 2; 4	**AUT**; **1**; 1	**AUT**; **2**; 2	FUJ; 1; 1	**FUJ**; **2**; 2	SUG; 1; 2	SUG; 2; 4	MOT; 1 Ret	MOT; 2 DSQ			2nd	185
2007	TDP Team TOM'S	Toyota	FUJ; 1; 3	**FUJ**; **2**; 1	**SUZ**; **1**; 1	SUZ; 2; 4	MOT; 1; 6	MOT; 2; 9	OKA; 1; 7	OKA; 2; 2	SUZ; 1; 2	SUZ; 2; 3	AUT; 1; 3	**AUT**; **2**; 2	**AUT**; **3**; 1	**FUJ**; **1**; 1	**FUJ**; **2**; 1	SEN; 1 Ret	SEN; 2; 3	SEN; 3 Ret	MOT; 1; 2	**MOT**; **2**; 1	1st	262

=== Complete Super GT results ===
Year	Team	Car	Class	1	2	3	4	5	6	7	8	9	DC	Pts
2006	apr	Toyota MR-S	GT300	SUZ; Ret	OKA; 15	FUJ; 9	SEP; 7	SUG; 7	SUZ; 14	MOT; 9	AUT; 5	FUJ; 4	15th	28
2007	apr	Toyota MR-S	GT300	SUZ; 3	OKA; 1	FUJ; 3	SEP; 1	SUG; 15	SUZ; 14	MOT; 21	AUT; 9	FUJ; 2	**1st**	**89**
2008	apr	Toyota MR-S	GT300	SUZ	OKA	FUJ	SEP	SUG	SUZ; 2	MOT	AUT	FUJ	22nd	17
2009	Lexus Team Kraft	Lexus SC430	GT500	OKA; 9	SUZ; 7	FUJ; 5	SEP; 9	SUG; 12	SUZ; 1	FUJ; 7	AUT; 7	MOT; 9	9th	44
2010	Lexus Team Kraft	Lexus SC430	GT500	SUZ; 6	OKA; 9	FUJ; 1	SEP; 7	SUG; Ret	SUZ; 5	FUJ; C	MOT; 4		6th	45
2011	Team LeMans	Lexus SC430	GT500	OKA; 11	FUJ; 2	SEP; 8	SUG; 5	SUZ; 8	FUJ; 10	AUT; 13	MOT; 15		11th	26
2012	Team LeMans	Lexus SC430	GT500	OKA; 13	FUJ; 10	SEP; 3	SUG; 1	SUZ; Ret	FUJ; 10	AUT; 12	MOT; 12		10th	33
2013	Team LeMans	Lexus SC430	GT500	OKA; 7	FUJ; 3	SEP; 7	SUG; 6	SUZ; Ret	FUJ; 4	AUT; 11	MOT; 1		5th	52
2014	Team LeMans	Lexus RC F	GT500	**OKA**; 2	FUJ; 3	AUT; 9	SUG; 5	FUJ; 13	SUZ; 5	BUR; 9	MOT; 11		7th	44
2015	Team LeMans	Lexus RC F	GT500	OKA; 9	FUJ; 9	BUR; 2	FUJ; 13	SUZ; Ret	SUG; 4	AUT; 8	MOT; 9		9th	32
2016	Team LeMans	Lexus RC F	GT500	OKA; 4	FUJ; 5	**SUG**; 4	FUJ; 9	SUZ; 4	BUR; 3	MOT; 4	MOT; 2		2nd	69
2017	Lexus Team LeMans Wako's	Lexus LC 500	GT500	OKA; 2	FUJ; 2	AUT; 13	**SUG**; 3	FUJ; 9	SUZ; 7	BUR; 2	MOT; 13		3rd	63
2018	Lexus Team LeMans Wako's	Lexus LC 500	GT500	OKA; 4	FUJ; 5	SUZ; 12	BUR; 2	FUJ; 7	AUT; 11	**SUG**; 9	MOT; 6		10th	41
2019	Lexus Team LeMans Wako's	Lexus LC 500 GT500	GT500	OKA; 13	FUJ; 8	SUZ; 3	BUR; 1	FUJ; 1	AUT; 6	**SUG**; 6	MOT; 2		1st	85
2020	TGR Team Wako's ROOKIE	Toyota GR Supra GT500	GT500	FUJ; 3	FUJ; 3	SUZ; 9	MOT; 4	FUJ; 2	SUZ; 12	MOT; 12	FUJ; Ret		7th	47
2021	TGR Team ENEOS ROOKIE	Toyota GR Supra GT500	GT500	OKA; 1	FUJ; 2	MOT; 13	SUZ; 12	SUG; 12†	AUT; 11	MOT; 6	**FUJ**; 3		5th	52
2022	TGR Team ENEOS ROOKIE	Toyota GR Supra GT500	GT500	**OKA**; 1	FUJ; 7‡	SUZ; 8	FUJ; 7	SUZ; 14	SUG; 11	AUT; 4	MOT; 3		5th	49
2023	TGR Team ENEOS ROOKIE	Toyota GR Supra GT500	GT500	OKA; 4	FUJ; 4	SUZ; 6	FUJ; 11	SUZ; 3	SUG; 6	AUT; 8	MOT; 6		7th	45
2024	TGR Team ENEOS ROOKIE	Toyota GR Supra GT500	GT500	OKA; NC	FUJ; 8	SUZ; 2	FUJ; 4	SUG; 9	AUT; 9	MOT; 13†	SUZ; 6		11th	38
2025	TGR Team ENEOS ROOKIE	Toyota GR Supra GT500	GT500	**OKA**; 2	FUJ; 6	SEP; 9	FS1; Ret	**FS2** (1)	SUZ; 2	SUG; 7	AUT; 9	MOT; 14	4th	54.5
2026	TGR Team ENEOS ROOKIE	Toyota GR Supra GT500	GT500	OKA; 4	**FUJ**; 2	FUJ; 7	SUZ; 8	SUG; 11	AUT; 13	MOT; DSQ	MOT; 5		10th	37

^{†} Driver did not finish, but was classified as he completed over 90% of the race distance.
^{‡} Half points awarded as less than 75% of race distance was completed.
^{(Number)} Driver did not take part in this sprint race, points are still awarded for the teammate's result.
^{*} Season still in progress.

=== Complete Formula Nippon/Super Formula results ===
Year	Team	Engine	1	2	3	4	5	6	7	8	9	10	11	12	DC	Pts
2009	Petronas Team TOM'S	Toyota	FUJ; 7	SUZ; 10	MOT; Ret	FUJ; 2	SUZ; 10	MOT; 11	AUT; 9	SUG; 6					9th	13
2010	Petronas Team TOM'S	Toyota	SUZ; 12	MOT; 8	FUJ; 4	MOT; 5	SUG; 1	**AUT**; DNS	SUZ; 5	SUZ; 7					6th	24
2011	Team LeMans	Toyota	SUZ; 5	AUT; 2	FUJ; 12	MOT; 8	SUZ; C	**SUG**; 6	MOT; Ret	MOT; 5					5th	19
2012	Team LeMans	Toyota	SUZ; 4	MOT; 8	AUT; 6	FUJ; 3	MOT; Ret	SUG; 4	SUZ; 8	SUZ; 7					7th	21.5
2015	Petronas Team TOM'S	Toyota	SUZ	OKA; 15	FUJ	MOT	AUT	SUG	SUZ	SUZ					20th	0
2017	SUNOCO Team LeMans	Toyota	SUZ; Ret	OKA; 15	OKA; 12	FUJ; 12	MOT; 10	AUT; 3	SUG; 15	SUZ; C	SUZ; C				12th	6
2018	UOMO Sunoco Team LeMans	Toyota	SUZ; 15	AUT; C	SUG; 15	FUJ; 7	MOT; 5	OKA; 16	SUZ; 14						12th	6
2019	UOMO Sunoco Team LeMans	Toyota	SUZ; 12	AUT; 3	SUG; 17	FUJ; 13	MOT; 11	OKA; 8	SUZ; 17						14th	7
2020	ROOKIE Racing	Toyota	MOT; 10	OKA; 16	SUG; 9	AUT; 17	SUZ; 12	SUZ; 9	FUJ; 14						19th	5
2021	NTT Communications ROOKIE	Toyota	FUJ; 10	SUZ1; 15	AUT; 8	SUG; 18	MOT1; Ret	MOT2; 11	SUZ2; 17						19th	2.5
2022	docomo business ROOKIE	Toyota	FUJ; 15	FUJ; 18	SUZ; 19	AUT; 15	SUG; 14	FUJ; 13	MOT; 17	MOT; 18	SUZ; 19	SUZ; 15			21st	0
2023	docomo business ROOKIE	Toyota	FUJ; 9	FUJ; 11	SUZ; 13	AUT; 12	SUG; 4	FUJ; 12	MOT; 8	SUZ; 19	SUZ; 14				14th	13
2024	docomo business ROOKIE	Toyota	SUZ; 13	AUT; 11	SUG; Ret	FUJ; 16	MOT; 14	FUJ; 15	FUJ; Ret	SUZ; Ret	SUZ; 15				19th	0
2025	docomo business ROOKIE	Toyota	SUZ; 13	SUZ; 10	MOT; 10	MOT; 6	AUT; 15	FUJ; 6	FUJ; 10	SUG; 18	FUJ; 13	SUZ; 6	SUZ; 10	SUZ; 18	14th	19

^{‡} Half points awarded as less than 75% of race distance was completed.
^{*} Season still in progress.

Sporting positions
Preceded by Hideto Yasuoka	Formula Toyota; Champion; 2005	Succeeded by Yuhi Sekiguchi
Preceded by Adrian Sutil	All-Japan Formula Three; Champion; 2007	Succeeded by Carlo van Dam
Preceded by Jenson Button; Naoki Yamamoto	Super GT; GT500 Champion; 2019; With: Kenta Yamashita	Succeeded by Naoki Yamamoto; Tadasuke Makino
