= 2019 Macau Grand Prix =

Formula Three motor race

Race details
Date	17 November 2019
Official name	66th Suncity Group Macau Grand Prix – FIA F3 World Cup
Location	Guia Circuit, Macau
Course	Temporary street circuit 6.120 km (3.803 mi)
Distance	Qualifying Race; 10 laps, 61.200 km (38.028 mi); Main Race; 15 laps, 91.800 km (57.042 mi)
Weather	Qualifying Race: Dry and clear Main Race: Dry and clear
- Qualifying Race

Pole
Driver	(Estonia) Jüri Vips	Hitech Grand Prix
Time	2:04.997

Fastest Lap
Driver	(Estonia) Jüri Vips	Hitech Grand Prix
Time	2:06.317 (on lap 8)

Podium
First	(Estonia) Jüri Vips	Hitech Grand Prix
Second	(Russia) Robert Shwartzman	SJM Prema Theodore Racing
Third	(Denmark) Christian Lundgaard	ART Grand Prix
- Main Race

Pole
Driver	(Estonia) Jüri Vips	Hitech Grand Prix

Fastest Lap
Driver	(United Kingdom) Jake Hughes	HWA Racelab
Time	2:06.419

Podium
First	(Netherlands) Richard Verschoor	MP Motorsport
Second	(Estonia) Jüri Vips	Hitech Grand Prix
Third	(United States) Logan Sargeant	Carlin Buzz Racing

The 2019 Macau Grand Prix (officially the 66th Suncity Group Macau Grand Prix – FIA F3 World Cup) was a Formula Three (F3) motor race held on the streets of Macau on 17 November 2019. Unlike previous races, the event was a non-championship round of the FIA Formula 3 Championship, and drivers from all F3 championships were welcome. The race itself was made up of two races: a ten-lap qualifying race to set the starting grid for the fifteen-lap main event. It was the 66th Macau Grand Prix, and the first for FIA Formula 3, a different specification than the pre-2018 specification now known as Formula Regional.

MP Motorsport driver Richard Verschoor won the event from fourth place. Hitech Grand Prix's Jüri Vips won the qualification race the day before and led the first seven laps of the main race before being passed by Verschoor on the eighth lap. Verschoor held off Vips' several overtake attempts to become the first rookie to win the Macau Grand Prix since Keisuke Kunimoto in 2008. He was the first Dutch driver to win the event and the second overall, after Roberto Moreno, to win the New Zealand Grand Prix and Macau. Vips finished second and Carlin Buzz Racing's Logan Sargeant was third.

== Background and entry list ==
The Macau Grand Prix is a Formula Three (F3) race considered to be a stepping stone to higher motor racing categories such as Formula One and has been termed the territory's most prestigious international sporting event. The event was made a non-championship round of the FIA Formula 3 Championship for the first time in 2019; its head Bruno Michel ensured the season concluded at the Sochi Autodrom and not the Yas Marina Circuit as it had been in the preceding GP3 Series to prevent logistical complications for drivers and teams. It was the 66th Macau Grand Prix, the 37th under F3 rules, and the 4th FIA F3 World Cup. The race was held on the temporary 6.120 km (3.803 mi) 22-turn Guia Circuit in Macau's streets on 17 November 2019 after three days of practice and qualifying.

Drivers with an FIA Grade B licence or higher who raced in the FIA F3 Championship or its regional championships were invited to compete in Macau by motorsport's world governing body, the Fédération Internationale de l'Automobile (FIA), with higher-placed drivers in these respective series receiving priority in earning an invitation to the meeting. The race's 30-car grid featured 2019 FIA Formula 3 champion Robert Shwartzman, two-time Macau Grand Prix winner Dan Ticktum, Deutsche Tourenwagen Masters driver Ferdinand Habsburg, FIA Formula Two competitor Callum Ilott, European Le Mans Series participant Arjun Maini, Japanese Formula 3 Championship racer Enaam Ahmed, and Enzo Fittipaldi and Sophia Flörsch from the Formula Regional European Championship. The Prema team hired Frederik Vesti, the Formula Regional European champion, to drive the injured Jehan Daruvala's car. Alex Peroni had to withdraw from the race due to a broken vertebrae he sustained in an accident at the Autodromo Nazionale di Monza.

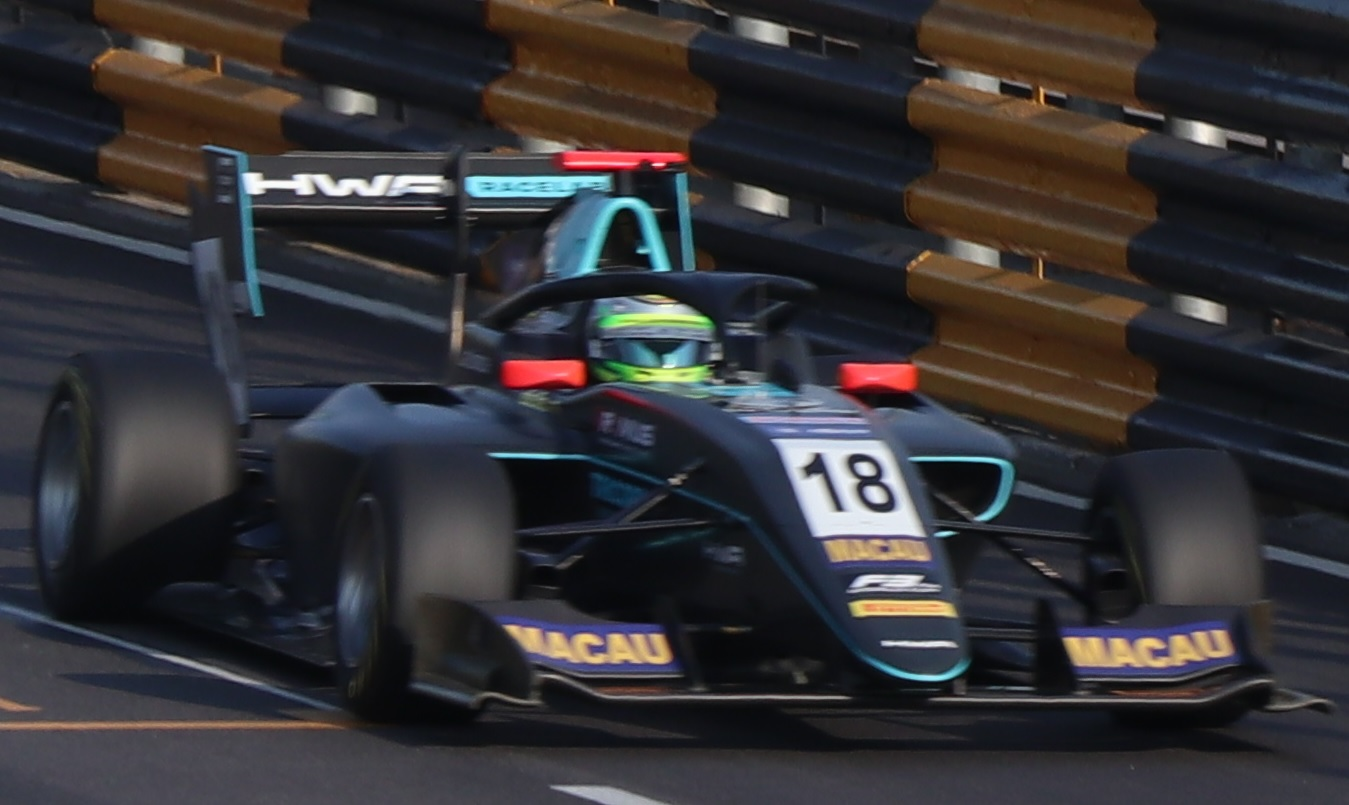
Sophia Flörsch returned to the race after she was involved in a major accident in the 2018 edition.

The replacement of the series' outdated Dallara F317 car with the more powerful Dallara F3 2019 prompted organisers to upgrade the Guia Circuit from an FIA Grade 3 to a Grade 2 homologation. Former FIA race director Charlie Whiting and circuit organisers indicated a desire for such a shift in May 2019. They moved the inside wall at Lisboa turn to guide cars away from its apex kerb and towards a widened run-off area, in response to a major accident involving Flörsch, Daruvala and Sho Tsuboi in the 2018 race. The corner's fencing was supported by a second row of fences on the Hotel Lisboa grounds, a tyre wall was installed, and a photographer's area that had halted Flörsch's car was dismantled. The Reservoir and Mandarin Bend corners were realigned and retrofitted with SAFER barriers. TecPro energy-absorbing walls were erected at the San Francisco, Hospital, and Fisherman's Bend bends, while foam-protection technologies were implemented throughout the track.

Pirelli supplied tyres for the event for the second time after 2016. Cars were installed with drag reduction system (DRS), an adjustable flap at the back of each car that helps with overtaking when activated, at Macau for the first time. It had one activation zone for the race: on the straight between the Mandarin Oriental Bend and Lisboa corners. The FIA Formula 3 Championship rules required entrants to be within a second of each other in order to use DRS. An electronic flag system was implemented and elevated for the first time in ten areas of the circuit to complement the existing flags waved by track marshals. The sections were chosen by the FIA, the Macau Grand Prix Committee, and numerous Macau government ministries, with the goal of expanding its deployment in the future. The Government of Macau's Civil Aviation Authority barred all unmanned aircraft from flying during the race weekend to improve safety and prevent hindrances.

== Practice and qualifying ==
Two 40-minute practice sessions, one on Thursday morning and the other on Friday morning, preceded the race on Sunday. Marcus Armstrong set new unofficial track lap record of 2:08.023 with two minutes remaining in the first session, which took place in clear and warm weather. He was followed by Jake Hughes, Ticktum, Shwartzman, Richard Verschoor, Ilott, Vesti, Ahmed, Logan Sargeant and Christian Lundgaard in positions two through ten. With sixteen minutes remaining, Yuki Tsunoda braked too late and hit a barrier at Hospital Bend, triggering the virtual safety car procedure that dictates vehicles slow down. The Hitech Grand Prix team repaired his car; he could not participate for most of the first qualifying session because of ongoing car work. Jüri Vips had to enter pit lane to have his open rear wing slot fixed after experiencing a DRS failure late in the session.

Two 40-minute sessions were held on Thursday afternoon and Friday afternoon, respectively, for qualifying. Each driver's final qualifying place was determined by the quickest time they recorded from either session. The first session was held in clear and warm weather. Armstrong set a benchmark fastest lap before Shwartzman and then Vips led. Hughes revised the overall fastest lap to 2:06.793 seconds for provisional pole position. David Beckmann was 0.051 seconds slower in second. Vips was third, early pace setter Armstrong fourth, and Sargeant fifth. Ticktum, in his first race driving the new F3 car, came sixth ahead of Ilott, Vesti, Shwartzman and Lundaard. Following them were the Italian duo of Leonardo Pulcini and Alessio Lorandi in 11th and 12th, and Felipe Drugovich, Verschoor, Maini, Sebastián Fernández, Ahmed, Liam Lawson, Habsburg, Keyvan Andres, Hon Chio Leong, David Schumacher, Flörsch, Fittipaldi, Andreas Estner, Lukas Dunner, Olli Caldwell, Alessio Deledda and Max Fewtrell. The top five drivers were separated by 0.619 seconds, while the faster Dallara cars' contributed to an average 3.5-second decrease in lap times. Four red flag stoppages occurred during the session. Fluids from Ahmed's car spilled onto the track en route to the pit lane after he struck a barrier at Lisboa corner. Fewtrell hit the outside barrier at Lisboa turn, and Caldwell stopped on the track after exiting Fisherman's Bend due to engine failure. The race director ended the session early when Tsunoda ran into a barrier at Maternity Bend.

Shwartzman led early in the second practice session, but Ticktum eventually went quicker. After that, with over five minutes left, Vips reset the unofficial circuit record to 2:06.569. Ilott was 0.568 seconds slower in second. Verschoor, Armstrong, Lawson, Ticktum, Maini, Shwartzman, Caldwell and Sargeant were third to tenth. Two different incidents necessitated two stoppages. Flörsch stopped against the barrier following the Melco hairpin due to an understeer. She stalled her car while reversing, which blocked the track. As a crane extricated Flörsch's car, Habsburg spun and stopped the session. Beckmann slid off course while braking for Police Corner with five minutes later. Ticktum was caught off guard and hit the rear of Beckmann's car at high speed, ending the session early. The stewards investigated Ticktum and imposed no penalty; they deemed him to have made "a significant attempt" to avoid Beckmann and a lack of time to notice double waved yellow flags to alert drivers to Ticktum's crash.

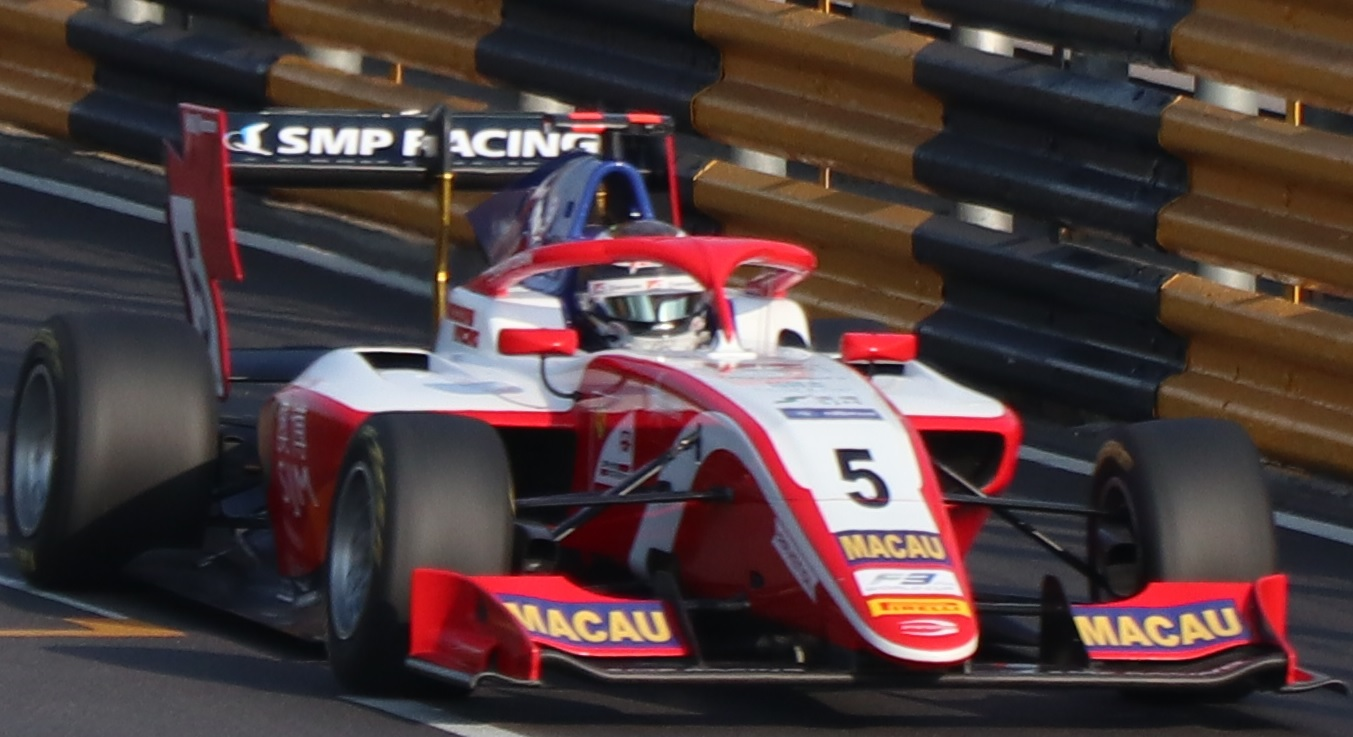
Robert Shwartzman started from second place on the grid

The second qualifying session was held in warmer weather than the first. It was first halted after ten minutes when Pulcini crashed; Fittipaldi was caught off guard by Pulcini's accident and hit the rear of his car. Before Armstrong crashed into an outside wall at Police turn and removed his front wing and right front tyre with 19 minutes remaining, he became the first driver to lap under the 2:06 mark. Vips reset the official track lap record to a 2:04.997—five seconds faster than the 2018 lap record—in the final seven minutes. The session ended with two minutes to go after a third stoppage, when Habsburg crashed and stopped on the circuit. Vips earned the pole position for the qualifying race. Shwartzman was 0.379 seconds slower in second place. Ilott, Lundgaard and Verschoor moved to third, fourth and fifth. Hughes fell from first to sixth, with Vesti and Maini seventh and eighth. Armstrong's crash put him ninth, Sargeant tenth, Habsburg eleventh and Fewtrell twelfth. Carlin mechanics rebuilt Ticktum's car; he had 20 minutes on the track and took 13th. Behind him the rest of the provisional order was Lorandi, Lawson, Drugovich, Caldwell, Fernández, Beckmann, Ahmed, Tsunoda, Andres, Schumacher, Dunner, Pulcini, Estner, Flörsch, Leong, Deledda and Fittipaldi.

=== Post-qualifying ===
After qualifying, the stewards imposed a three-place grid penalty on Tsunoda, deeming him to have reversed in "an unexpected manner" to rejoin the circuit after venturing onto the Lisboa corner run-off area.

=== Qualifying classification ===
Each of the driver's fastest lap times from the two qualifying sessions are denoted in bold.

Final qualifying classification
Pos	No.	Driver	Team	Q1 Time	Rank	Q2 Time	Rank	Gap	Grid
1	6	(Estonia) Jüri Vips	Hitech Grand Prix	2:06.943	3	**2:04.997**	1	—	1
2	5	(Russia) Robert Shwartzman	SJM Prema Theodore Racing	2:08.083	9	**2:05.376**	2	+0.379	2
3	25	(United Kingdom) Callum Ilott	Sauber Junior Team by Charouz	2:07.781	7	**2:05.580**	3	+0.583	3
4	9	(Denmark) Christian Lundgaard	ART Grand Prix	2:08.250	10	**2:05.669**	4	+0.672	4
5	21	(Netherlands) Richard Verschoor	MP Motorsport	2:08.578	14	**2:05.723**	5	+0.726	5
6	16	(United Kingdom) Jake Hughes	HWA Racelab	2:06.793	1	**2:05.774**	6	+0.777	6
7	3	(Denmark) Frederik Vesti	SJM Prema Theodore Racing	2:07.903	8	**2:05.776**	7	+0.779	7
8	22	(India) Arjun Maini	Jenzer Motorsport	2:08.644	15	**2:05.814**	8	+0.817	8
9	2	(New Zealand) Marcus Armstrong	SJM Prema Theodore Racing	2:07.285	4	**2:05.955**	9	+0.958	9
10	28	(United States) Logan Sargeant	Carlin Buzz Racing	2:07.412	5	**2:06.043**	10	+1.046	10
11	10	(Austria) Ferdinand Habsburg	ART Grand Prix	2:09.490	19	**2:06.209**	11	+1.212	11
12	7	(United Kingdom) Max Fewtrell	Hitech Grand Prix	2:16.536	29	**2:06.368**	12	+1.371	12
13	30	(United Kingdom) Dan Ticktum	Carlin Buzz Racing	2:07.600	6	**2:06.406**	13	+1.409	13
14	15	(Italy) Alessio Lorandi	Trident Motorsport	2:08.357	12	**2:06.428**	14	+1.431	14
15	20	(New Zealand) Liam Lawson	MP Motorsport	2:09.296	18	**2:06.455**	15	+1.458	15
16	29	(Brazil) Felipe Drugovich	Carlin Buzz Racing	2:08.487	13	**2:06.637**	16	+1.640	16
17	12	(United Kingdom) Olli Caldwell	Trident Motorsport	2:12.105	27	**2:06.641**	17	+1.644	17
18	11	(Spain) Sebastián Fernández	ART Grand Prix	2:09.052	16	**2:06.717**	18	+1.720	18
19	14	(Germany) David Beckmann	Trident Motorsport	**2:06.844**	2	2:08.273	24	+1.847	19
20	32	(United Kingdom) Enaam Ahmed	Campos Racing	2:09.211	17	**2:07.146**	19	+2.149	20
21	8	(Japan) Yuki Tsunoda	Hitech Grand Prix	—	30	**2:07.307**	20	+2.310	24^{1}
22	17	(Iran) Keyvan Andres	HWA Racelab	2:09.660	20	**2:07.579**	21	+2.582	21
23	26	(Germany) David Schumacher	Sauber Junior Team by Charouz	2:10.381	22	**2:07.587**	22	+2.590	22
24	19	(Austria) Lukas Dunner	MP Motorsport	2:11.129	26	**2:07.892**	23	+2.895	23
25	33	(Italy) Leonardo Pulcini	Campos Racing	**2:08.287**	11	2:10.001	28	+3.290	25
26	24	(Germany) Andreas Estner	Jenzer Motorsport	2:11.006	25	**2:08.651**	25	+3.654	26
27	18	(Germany) Sophia Flörsch	HWA Racelab	2:10.889	23	**2:09.259**	26	+4.262	27
28	23	(Macau) Hon Chio Leong	Jenzer Motorsport	2:09.918	21	**2:09.568**	27	+4.571	28
29	31	(Italy) Alessio Deledda	Campos Racing	2:12.991	28	**2:10.114**	29	+5.117	29
30	27	(Brazil) Enzo Fittipaldi	Sauber Junior Team by Charouz	2:10.894	24	**2:10.124**	30	+5.127	30
**Bold time** indicates the faster of the two times that determined grid order.

- **^1** – Yuki Tsunoda had a three-place grid penalty because he was deemed to have reversed in "an unexpected manner" to rejoin the track.

== Qualification race ==
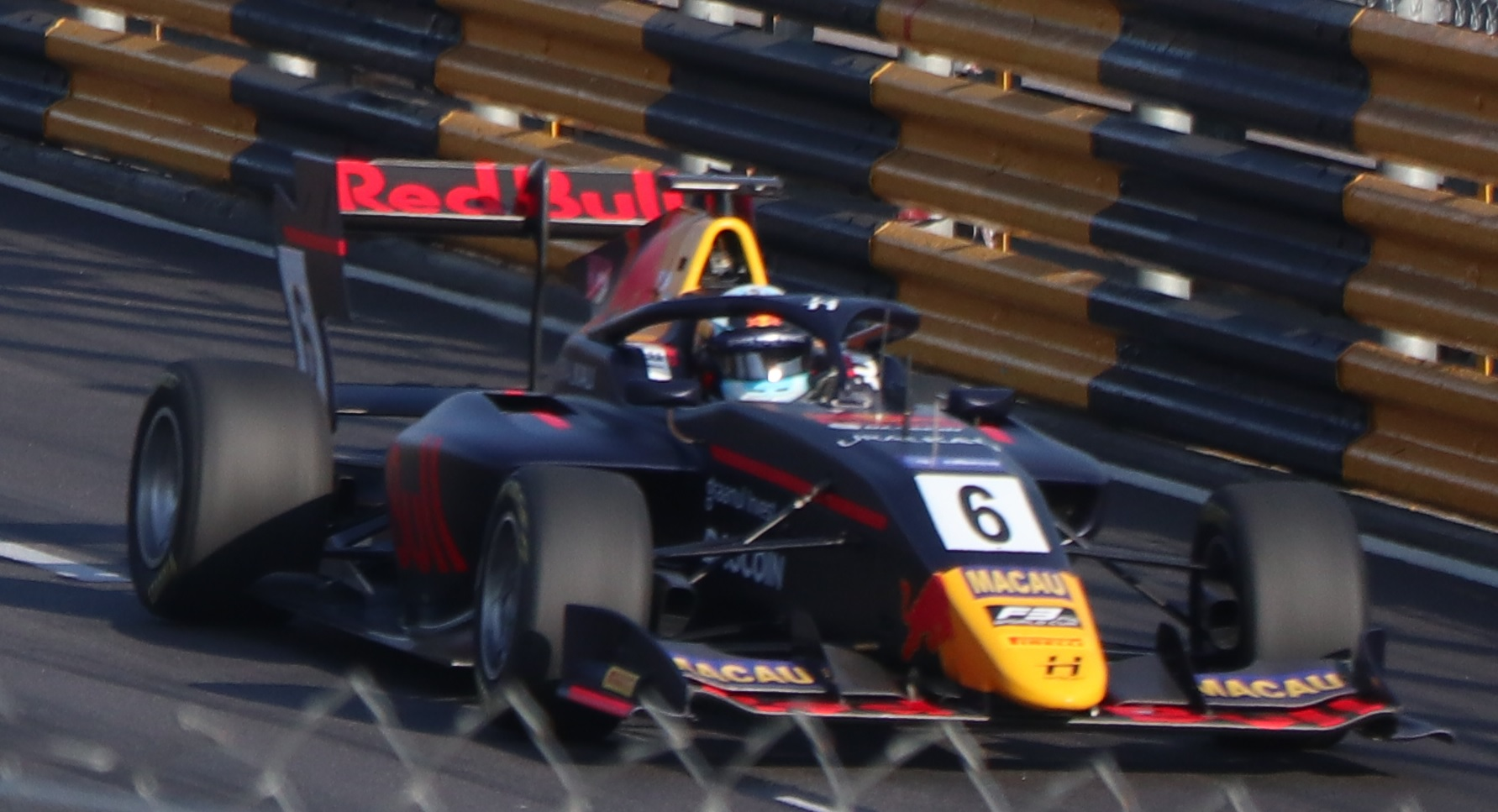
Jüri Vips won the qualification race to begin the Grand Prix from pole position.

The 10-lap qualifying race to set the main race's starting order commenced in dry and clear weather with an air temperature at 24 °C (75 °F) at 09:00 Macau Standard Time (UTC+08:00) on 16 November. Vips kept the lead from Shwartzman heading into Lisboa turn after a slow start. Lundgaard overtook Ilott for third and slipstreamed Shwartzman, who held second from Lundgaard. Further back, Sargeant braked later than other drivers and his front wing glanced Maini's rear-right wheel. Maini was sent into a spin and collided with a trackside wall, causing his vehicle to protrude at the exit of the Lisboa turn. Ticktum attempted to pass Hughes as he navigated his way past Maini's car and they collided. Ticktum was launched into the air and made a repair stop. Hughes and Ahmed were caught up in the crash as Sargeant continued driving. Officials dispatched the safety car to allow track marshals to clear debris. Armstrong and Vesti lost several positions, promoting Lorandi and Schumacher to the top ten; Schumacher made a pit stop for unknown reasons and fell down the order.

The safety car was withdrawn on the fourth lap and Vips maintained the lead from Shwartzman at the rolling restart. Vips began to draw away from the rest of the field to the point where he was able to prevent Shwartzman from overtaking him with DRS. DRS was used by several drivers until it was disabled due to a sensor failure that limited its use. On the eighth lap, Verschoor caught Ilott and used the slipstream from the back of the latter's vehicle to pass him for fourth place on the straight linking the Mandarin Oriental Bend and Lisboa turns. On the same lap, Drugovich in 15th made a braking error for the Lisboa turn and crashed, forcing him to retire. He exited his car unaided and swift work by track marshals to extricate his car before the field passed by eliminated the need for a second safety car deployment. Vips finished the qualification race first to earn pole position for the Grand Prix. Shwartzman was second and Lundgaard third. The final classified finishers were Verschoor, Ilott, Sargeant, Lorandi, Habsburg, Beckmann, Pulcini, Andres, Dunner, Leong, Fittipaldi, Fernández, Tsunoda, Armstrong, Vesti, Estner, Lawson, Flörsch, Fewtrell, Caldwell, Deledda and Schumacher.

=== Qualification race classification ===
Final qualification race classification
Pos	No.	Driver	Team	Laps	Time/Retired	Grid
1	6	(Estonia) Jüri Vips	Hitech Grand Prix	10	25:09.190	1
2	5	(Russia) Robert Shwartzman	SJM Prema Theodore Racing	10	+1.549	2
3	9	(Denmark) Christian Lundgaard	ART Grand Prix	10	+5.625	4
4	21	(Netherlands) Richard Verschoor	MP Motorsport	10	+7.402	5
5	25	(United Kingdom) Callum Ilott	Sauber Junior Team by Charouz	10	+10.767	3
6	28	(United States) Logan Sargeant	Carlin Buzz Racing	10	+11.216	10
7	15	(Italy) Alessio Lorandi	Trident Motorsport	10	+11.900	14
8	10	(Austria) Ferdinand Habsburg	ART Grand Prix	10	+13.200	11
9	14	(Germany) David Beckmann	Trident Motorsport	10	+20.006	19
10	33	(Italy) Leonardo Pulcini	Campos Racing	10	+25.551	25
11	17	(Iran) Keyvan Andres	HWA Racelab	10	+26.416	22
12	19	(Austria) Lukas Dunner	MP Motorsport	10	+28.233	24
13	23	(Macau) Hon Chio Leong	Jenzer Motorsport	10	+32.905	28
14	27	(Brazil) Enzo Fittipaldi	Sauber Junior Team by Charouz	10	+33.676	30
15	11	(Spain) Sebastián Fernández	ART Grand Prix	10	+34.261	18
16	8	(Japan) Yuki Tsunoda	Hitech Grand Prix	10	+34.698	21
17	2	(New Zealand) Marcus Armstrong	SJM Prema Theodore Racing	10	+35.403	9
18	3	(Denmark) Frederik Vesti	SJM Prema Theodore Racing	10	+35.653	7
19	24	(Germany) Andreas Estner	Jenzer Motorsport	10	+36.687	26
20	20	(New Zealand) Liam Lawson	MP Motorsport	10	+37.151	15
21	18	(Germany) Sophia Flörsch	HWA Racelab	10	+38.158	27
22	7	(United Kingdom) Max Fewtrell	Hitech Grand Prix	10	+38.634	12
23	12	(United Kingdom) Olli Caldwell	Trident Motorsport	10	+39.338	17
24	31	(Italy) Alessio Deledda	Campos Racing	10	+58.920	29
25	26	(Germany) David Schumacher	Sauber Junior Team by Charouz	10	+1:37.059	23
NC†	30	(United Kingdom) Dan Ticktum	Carlin Buzz Racing	8	+2 Laps	13^{2}
Ret	29	(Brazil) Felipe Drugovich	Carlin Buzz Racing	8	Accident	16
Ret	16	(United Kingdom) Jake Hughes	HWA Racelab	0	Accident	6
Ret	22	(India) Arjun Maini	Jenzer Motorsport	0	Accident	8
Ret	32	(United Kingdom) Enaam Ahmed	Campos Racing	0	Accident	20
Fastest Lap: Jüri Vips, 2:06.317, 174.4 mph (280.7 km/h) on Lap 8

- ^2 – Dan Ticktum was running at the completion of the race and was not classified because he failed to complete 90 per cent of the total race distance.

== Main race ==
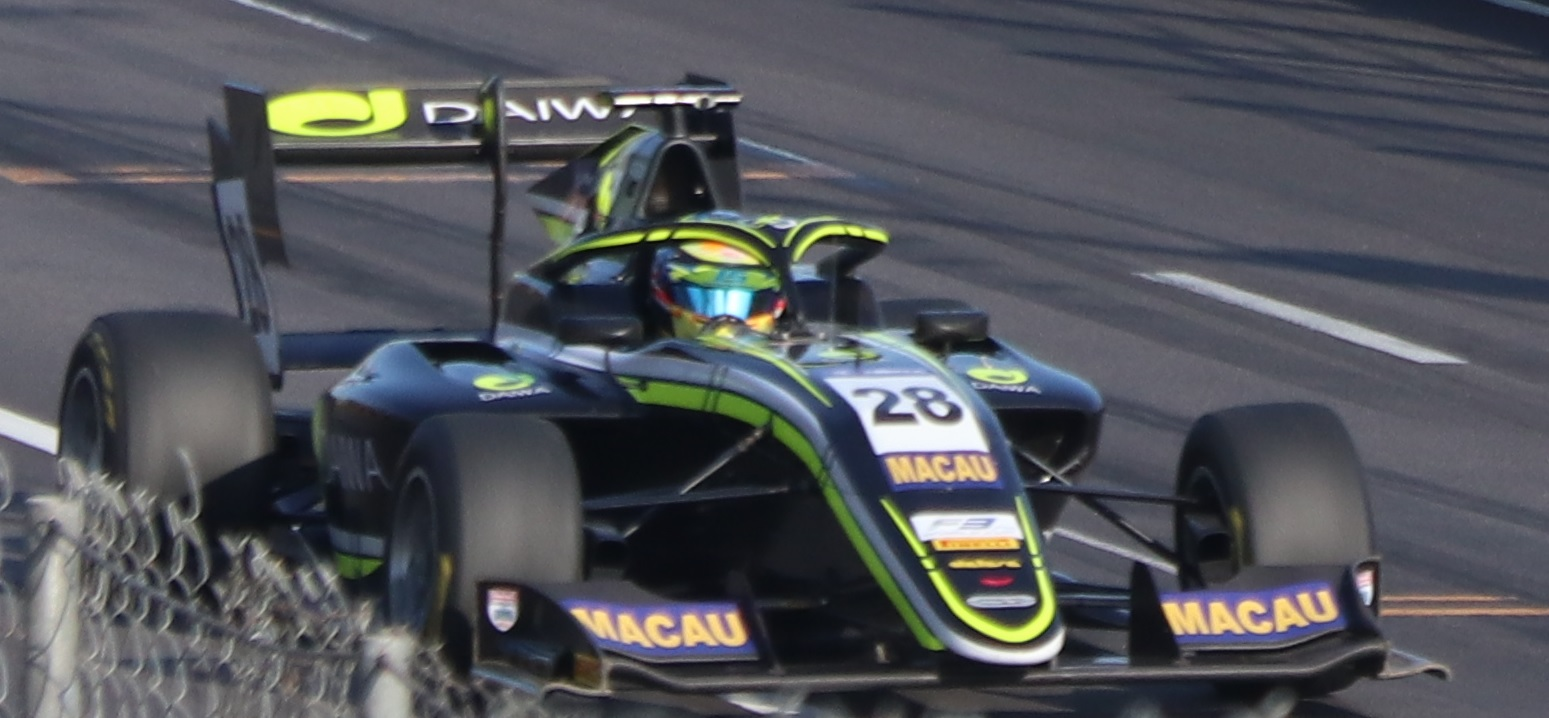
Logan Sargeant finished the Grand Prix in third position from a sixth-place start

The 15-lap race began in dry and clear weather of 25 °C (77 °F) at 15:30 local time on 17 November. Vips maintained the lead into Mandarin Oriental Bend. Shwartzman in second position had a slow start and Lundgaard on the right drew alongside him; Verschoor steered right to go three-abreast as he slipstreamed past Lundgaard and Shwartzman for second. Room on the track lessened and Shwartzman and Lundgaard collided. Shwartzman's front-right wing end-plate collided with Lundgaard's rear-left wheel, causing the latter to drive over the appendage and puncture Shwartzman's front-right tyre. Shwartzman slowed and stopped on Lisboa corner's run-off area to retire. Ilott made a slow getaway and fell to eighth. By the conclusion of lap one Lawson had moved from 20th to 13th as Armstrong had overtaken Vesti for 16th, and Vips led Verschoor by 1.8 seconds.

Caldwell retired on the fourth lap owing to the results of an earlier collision that damaged his front wing and a tyre. Pulcini retired from seventh when he struck a tyre barrier at Lisboa corner. Soon after, the safety car was deployed due to an accident, erasing Vips' lead over Verschoor: Habsburg rushed into the Solitude Esses, ricocheted off a right-hand-side kerb, and struck the wall. Habsburg exited his car unhurt and unaided as both his and Pulicini's cars were extricated from the circuit. At the restart on lap eight, which saw the field return to racing speed, Verschoor prepared to pass Vips while the latter weaved on the track to avoid being slipstreamed by the former. Verschoor had a strong side slipstream, more speed and grip, turned left and braked later than Vips to take the lead before Lisboa corner. Sargeant overtook Lorandi for fourth and an understeer lost Andres eighth to Lawson. On lap nine Sargeant passed Lundgaard at Lisboa corner for third.

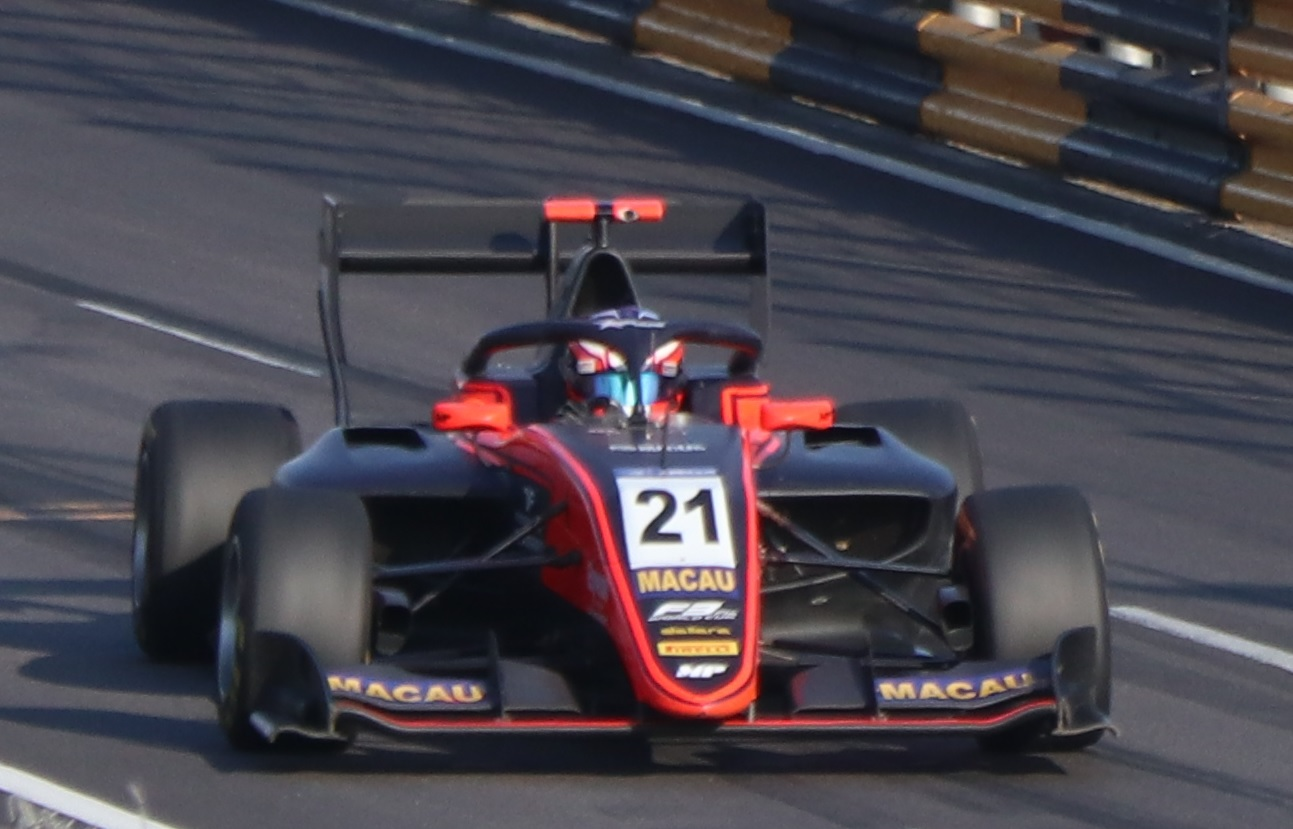
Richard Verschoor won the race to become the first Dutch driver to win the Macau Grand Prix and was the first rookie to win the event since Keisuke Kunimoto in the 2008 edition.

Flörsch experienced an electrical fault on the straight before Mandarin Oriental Bend on lap nine, prompting a virtual safety car period to temporarily stop racing and allow for the recovery of Flörsch's car. When the virtual safety car procedure was lifted, Vips drove on debris and wore his tyres, reducing their grip. He drew close to Verschoor after the latter made an error at Police Bend but could not pass him due to the narrow track. Vips subsequently tried to pass Verschoor into Lisboa turn on lap eleven; the latter swerved to avoid a trackside wall and braked as late as possible to maintain the lead. On the next lap, Vips attempted to pass Verschoor on the entry to Lisboa corner using DRS, but was unsuccessful since Verschoor went left as late as he could. Verschoor caused Vips to run close to the turn's run-off area after Vips flat-spotted his tyres, affecting his car's handling.

Vips was still able to get close to Verschoor, who had adapted to a bent steering arm and was fighting for control of his car. Both Verschoor and Vips made errors on the 14th lap; Verschoor locked his tyres and Vips oversteered at Fisherman's Bend. Vips again used DRS and Verschoor defended the lead. On his first appearance in Macau, it was Verschoor's victory, achieving the first win for a rookie driver in Macau since Keisuke Kunimoto in 2008. He was the first Dutch driver to win the race, and the second to win the Macau and New Zealand Grands Prix after Roberto Moreno in 1982. Vips finished second, surpassing Ralf Aron as the highest-placed Estonian in Macau, and Sargeant third. Off the podium, Lundgaard was fourth after Sargeant held him off. Lorandi finished fifth in his first race back from a thumb injury. Ilott took sixth ahead of Lawson, who gained 13 places after starting 20th. Armstrong, Beckmann, Vesti, Tsunoda, Andres, Ticktum, Dunner, Fernández, Fittipaldi, Hughes, Fewtrell, Leong, Estner, Schumacher, Ahmed, Maini, Drugovich and Deledda were the final finishers.

=== Post-race ===
The top three drivers appeared on the podium to collect their trophies and spoke to the media in a later press conference. Verschoor stated his happiness at winning and declared a desire to return to Macau in 2020: "To be honest, I am not believing the feeling yet! It hasn't sunk in that I have just won the Macau Grand Prix! It was a really busy race and I was under a lot of pressure. I had to concentrate so much towards the end, and I am still recovering a bit. Both the team and myself are maybe not as experienced yet or consistently at the same level as some of the other guys, so this is a huge result for the team, myself and everyone involved." Vips expressed disappointment at not winning and blamed it on a DRS failure and tyre degradation on his car: "I'm just feeling disappointed because I think I did the perfect weekend minus the safety car restart. The DRS was supposed to work but it didn't. I don't know how I managed to keep Richard under pressure in the middle sector because my tyres were finished."

Sargeant thanked his team Carlin for the work they put in for the race: "They have done an absolutely brilliant job this weekend. I think we have come here with full force and full preparation. It's been a difficult year and that's why I want to really thank Carlin, because we've really brought something extra here and we have worked hard for it." Shwartzman declared himself to have had a "very sad" early end to his race: "All weekend we had really good pace and were fighting for the win. Macau is like a gambling game, you never know what is going to happen. Anyways, we did all we could this week, thank you Prema – the car was on the top [level]." Ilott said he had not driven the Dallara car before the race or did any simulator running due to air flight cancellations. He spoke of the car on the race, "We changed a lot on the car after the qualification race and it did work out. But I lost a bit of time from the virtual safety car and trying to work back from that was quite difficult."

=== Race classification ===
Final race classification
Pos	No.	Driver	Team	Laps	Time/Retired	Grid
1	21	(Netherlands) Richard Verschoor	MP Motorsport	15	38:10.330	4
2	6	(Estonia) Jüri Vips	Hitech Grand Prix	15	+0.792	1
3	28	(United States) Logan Sargeant	Carlin Buzz Racing	15	+1.540	6
4	9	(Denmark) Christian Lundgaard	ART Grand Prix	15	+2.241	3
5	15	(Italy) Alessio Lorandi	Trident Motorsport	15	+5.020	7
6	25	(United Kingdom) Callum Ilott	Sauber Junior Team by Charouz	15	+5.922	5
7	20	(New Zealand) Liam Lawson	MP Motorsport	15	+8.954	20
8	2	(New Zealand) Marcus Armstrong	SJM Prema Theodore Racing	15	+9.365	17
9	14	(Germany) David Beckmann	Trident Motorsport	15	+13.239	9
10	3	(Denmark) Frederik Vesti	SJM Prema Theodore Racing	15	+13.633	18
11	8	(Japan) Yuki Tsunoda	Hitech Grand Prix	15	+15.717	16
12	17	(Iran) Keyvan Andres	HWA Racelab	15	+18.665	11
13	30	(United Kingdom) Dan Ticktum	Carlin Buzz Racing	15	+19.230	26
14	19	(Austria) Lukas Dunner	MP Motorsport	15	+20.498	12
15	11	(Spain) Sebastián Fernández	ART Grand Prix	15	+21.705	15
16	27	(Brazil) Enzo Fittipaldi	Sauber Junior Team by Charouz	15	+26.174	14
17	16	(United Kingdom) Jake Hughes	HWA Racelab	15	+26.294	28
18	7	(United Kingdom) Max Fewtrell	Hitech Grand Prix	15	+28.690	22
19	23	(Macau) Hon Chio Leong	Jenzer Motorsport	15	+33.792	13
20	24	(Germany) Andreas Estner	Jenzer Motorsport	15	+34.400	19
21	26	(Germany) David Schumacher	Sauber Junior Team by Charouz	15	+35.894	25
22	32	(United Kingdom) Enaam Ahmed	Campos Racing	15	+36.521	30
23	22	(India) Arjun Maini	Jenzer Motorsport	15	+37.184	29
24	29	(Brazil) Felipe Drugovich	Carlin Buzz Racing	15	+37.621	27
25	31	(Italy) Alessio Deledda	Campos Racing	15	+53.135	24
Ret	18	(Germany) Sophia Flörsch	HWA Racelab	8	Electrics	21
Ret	10	(Austria) Ferdinand Habsburg	ART Grand Prix	3	Crash	8
Ret	33	(Italy) Leonardo Pulcini	Campos Racing	3	Crash	10
Ret	12	(United Kingdom) Olli Caldwell	Trident Motorsport	3	Suspension	23
Ret	5	(Russia) Robert Shwartzman	SJM Prema Theodore Racing	0	Crash	2
Fastest Lap: Jake Hughes, 2:06.419, 174.2 km/h (108.2 mph) on Lap 14

== See also ==
- 2019 FIA GT World Cup
- 2019 Guia Race of Macau
