= Carlo van Dam =

Dutch racing driver

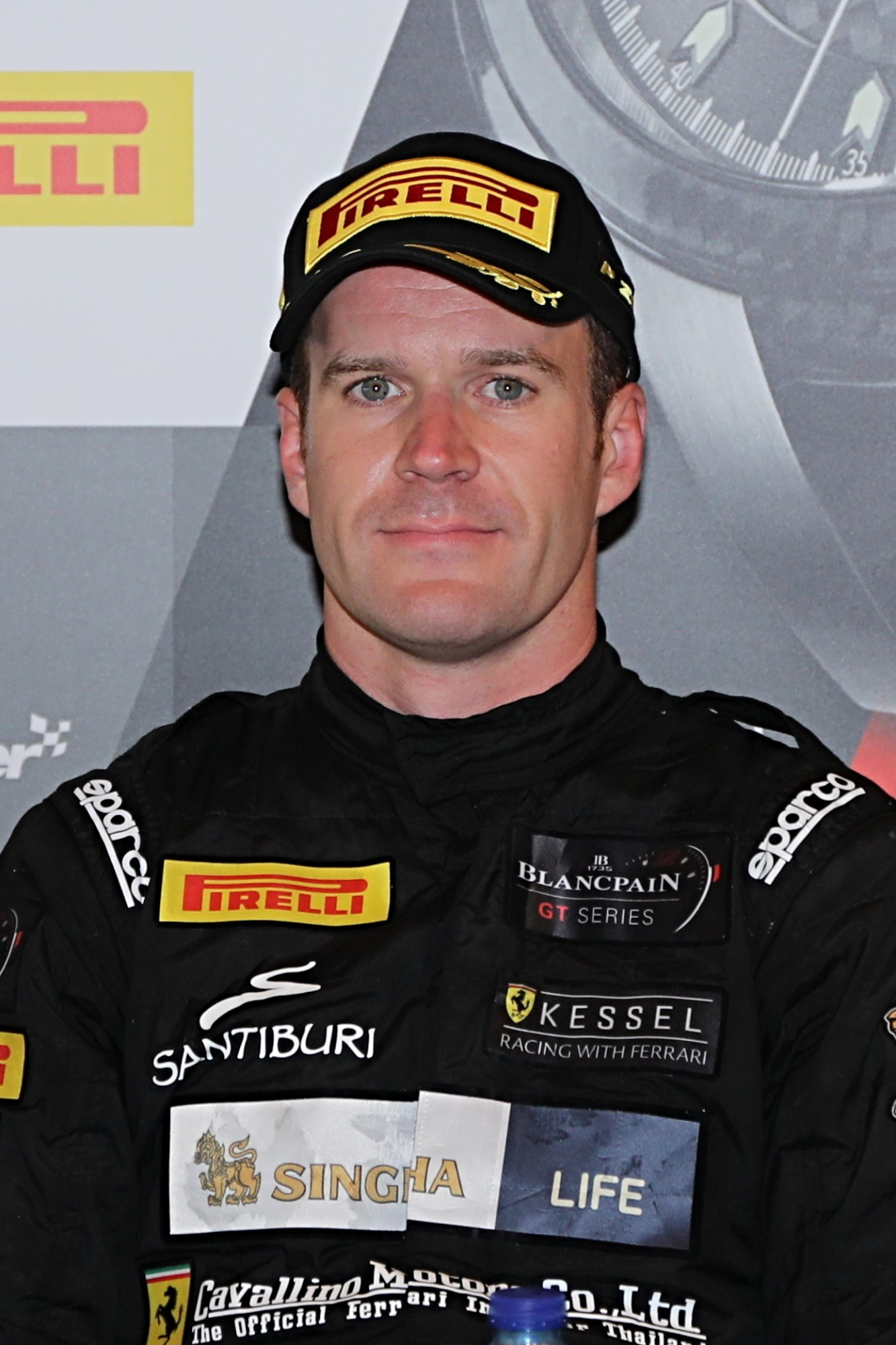
- Nationality: (Netherlands) Dutch
- Born: 27 February 1986 (age 40) Vlaardingen (Netherlands)
- Categorisation: FIA Gold

Previous series
- 2007-09 2009 2008 2008, 10-13 2007 2007 2006 2005–06 2004–05 2004: Formula 3 Euro Series; Superleague Formula; All-Japan Formula Three; Super GT; German F3; Renault Eurocup; French Formula Renault 2.0; Eurocup Formula Renault 2.0; FR2.0 Netherlands; FR2000 Germany

Championship titles
- 2008 2007: All-Japan Formula Three; German F3

Carlo van Dam (born 27 February 1986 in Vlaardingen) is a Dutch racing driver. He is currently a factory driver for Subaru and he is the reserve and test driver for R&D Sport in the Super GT Series while driving for Subaru Tecnica International in the 24 Hours of Nürburgring and the Nürburgring Endurance Series. Also, he is competing in Superrace Championship with AMC Motorsport.

== Career ==
=== Formula Renault ===
A veteran of karting, and a former member of the Renault Driver Development programme, van Dam stepped up into single-seaters in 2004, competing mainly in the Dutch Formula Renault series. In his debut season, he achieved three pole positions and three fastest laps, on his way to fifth in the championship. He also competed in four German Formula Renault races, amassing eighteen points in total. He continued in the Dutch series in 2005, and also moved up to the pan-European championship with SG Formula. With most of his focus on the European series, van Dam finished on the podium four times on his way to fourth in the championship. He ended up seventh in the Dutch series, despite only competing in six races. 2006 saw a second season of European Formula Renault for van Dam, and he added a campaign in the French series, again with SG Formula. Despite only winning one of the first twelve races, van Dam trailed Chris van der Drift by just two points in the Eurocup standings, going into the final round in Barcelona. However, both drivers were overtaken by Filipe Albuquerque as the Portuguese driver won both races to clinch the title. Van Dam was fourteenth overall in the French series, competing in just six of the races due to his Eurocup campaign.

=== Formula Three ===
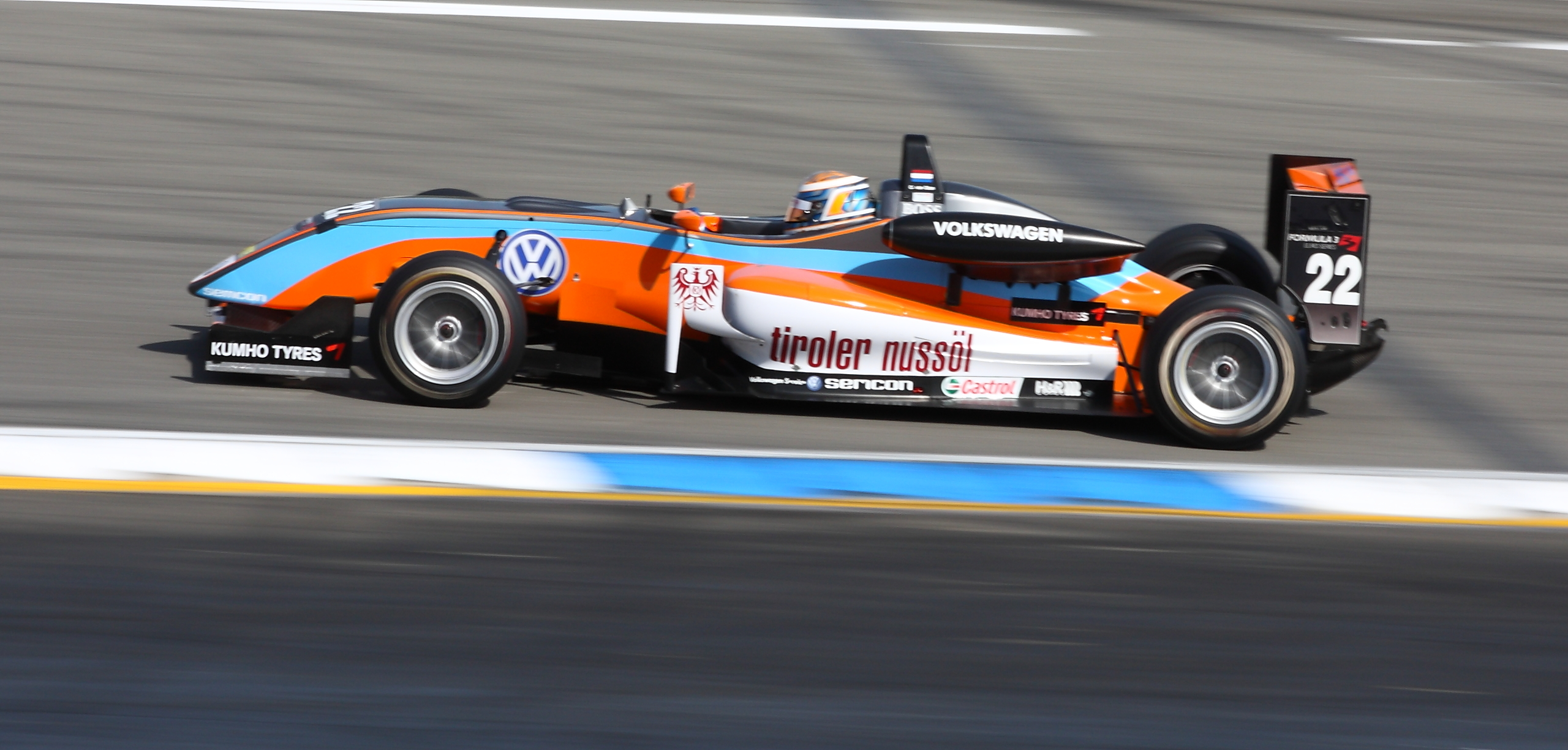
Van Dam on the Formula Three Euroseries at the Hockenheimring (2009)

Van Dam moved up to Formula Three for 2007, competing for Van Amersfoort Racing in the ATS Formel 3 Cup. He was a runaway winner of the championship, clinching the title with a round to spare at the Sachsenring, amassing sixteen podiums from the eighteen races. He also became the youngest championship winner in its history, however this has since been surpassed by Laurens Vanthoor, who won the 2009 championship. Van Dam also tested a GP2 Series car at the end of the season, as a result of winning the title. He also made appearances in the Formula Three Euroseries for RC Motorsport, at the final round at Hockenheim, and the Renault Eurocup for Racing for Belgium. He made his first trip to Macau for the world-famous Macau Grand Prix, but failed to finish the race for HBR Motorsport.

=== Move to Japan ===
After failing to find a suitable drive in Europe, van Dam followed the lead of James Courtney, Adrian Sutil and Oliver Jarvis and moved to Japan to compete in the All-Japan Formula Three series, with the TOM'S team. He dominated the series, winning nine of the eighteen races, finishing every race on the podium en route to a 103-point winning margin over teammate Keisuke Kunimoto. TOM's also won the teams title, winning the championship by 187 points. Van Dam also made three appearances in the Super GT series, competing in the GT500 class at the Suzuka 1000km, and in the GT300 class at Autopolis and Fuji Speedway. At Suzuka, he ended up third overall, teaming up with TOM'S regular Super GT drivers Juichi Wakisaka and André Lotterer. In GT300, van Dam replaced Cusco Racing's Kota Sasaki, and ended up with results of sixth at Autopolis, and third at Fuji.

At the conclusion of the season, van Dam headed to the Macau Grand Prix with TOM's, and took a surprise pole for the team for the qualification race, heading Kunimoto in a TOM's 1-2. A disappointing qualification race saw van Dam retire on the first lap, having suffered a puncture at Mandarin Bend and then collided with fellow Dutchman Renger van der Zande at San Francisco. He retired on lap seven of the Grand Prix, that was eventually won by teammate Kunimoto.

=== Return to Europe ===
A return to the Formula Three Euroseries beckoned for van Dam, with a 2009 campaign for Kolles & Heinz Union, the new team set up by Colin Kolles and Werner Heinz. However, the partnership was not to last, as after the rounds at Lausitz, van Dam parted company with the team. In four races, his best finish was eighteenth during the season-opening race at Hockenheim. Van Dam drove in the 24-hour endurance races at the Nürburgring and at Spa, before agreeing to drive the car of PSV Eindhoven in the Superleague Formula series. He replaced Dominick Muermans in the car, with the team lying eighteenth in the overall standings. However, he returned to the Euroseries, for the Barcelona rounds, rejoining his former team SG Formula.

== Racing record ==
=== Career summary ===
Season	Series	Team name	Races	Wins	Poles	F/Laps	Podiums	Points	Position
2004	Formula Renault 2000 Germany	Van Amersfoort Racing	4	0	0	0	0	18	30th
2004	Dutch Formula Renault 2000		?	0	3	3	3	142	5th
2005	Eurocup Formula Renault 2.0	SG Formula	16	0	0	1	4	100	4th
2005	Dutch Formula Renault 2.0	SG Formula	6	0	0	?	3	74	7th
2006	Eurocup Formula Renault 2.0	SG Formula	14	1	2	1	5	90	**3rd**
2006	French Formula Renault 2.0	SG Formula	7	0	1	2	2	15	13th
2007	ATS Formel 3 Cup	Van Amersfoort Racing	18	9	10	7	16	159	**1st**
2007	Macau Grand Prix	HBR Motorsport	1	0	0	0	0	N/A	14th
2007	Formula 3 Euro Series	RC Motorsport	2	0	0	0	0	0	NC
2007	Eurocup Mégane Trophy	Racing for Belgium	8	0	0	0	0	6	18th
2008	All-Japan Formula Three	TOM'S	18	9	10	6	18	322	**1st**
2008	Macau Grand Prix	TOM'S	1	0	0	0	0	N/A	NC
2008	Super GT GT500	TOM'S	1	0	0	0	1	11	20th
2008	Super GT GT300	Cusco Racing	2	0	1	0	1	16	23rd
2009	Formula 3 Euro Series	Kolles & Heinz Union	6	0	0	0	0	0	31st
2009	Formula 3 Euro Series	SG Formula	6	0	0	0	0	0	31st
2009	Superleague Formula	PSV Eindhoven	6	0	0	0	0	145†	18th†
2009	24 Hours of Spa	Full Speed Racing	1	0	0	0	0	N/A	NC
2009	24 Hours of Nürburgring	Volkswagen Motorsport	1	0	0	0	0	N/A	20th
2010	Super GT	SARD	1	0	0	0	0	0	NC
2011	Super GT	Direction Racing; LMP Motorsport	6	0	0	0	0	1	24th
2012	Super GT	Honda Racing	8	1	0	0	0	40	6th
2013	Super GT	Cars Tokai Dream28	1	0	0	0	0	0	NC
2014	Super GT	Audi Sport Team Hitotsuyama	1	0	0	0	0	0	NC
2014	Asian Le Mans Series	AAI-Rstrada	1	1	?	?	1	?	?
2015	GT Asia Series	Singha Motorsport	9	1	?	?	3	94	8

† - Team standings.

=== Complete Eurocup Formula Renault 2.0 results ===
(key) (Races in bold indicate pole position; races in italics indicate fastest lap)

Year	Entrant	1	2	3	4	5	6	7	8	9	10	11	12	13	14	15	16	DC	Points
2005	SG Formula	ZOL; 1 Ret	ZOL; 2; 7	VAL; 1; 24	VAL; 2; 5	LMS; 1; 4	LMS; 2; 4	BIL; 1; 6	BIL; 2; 3	OSC; 1; 6	OSC; 2; 3	DON; 1; 4	DON; 2; 6	EST; 1; 5	EST; 2; 3	MNZ; 1; 27	MNZ; 2; 2	4th	100
2006	SG Formula	ZOL; 1; 5	ZOL; 2; 24	IST; 1; 2	IST; 2; 3	MIS; 1; 8	MIS; 2; 6	NÜR; 1; 6	NÜR; 2; 8	DON; 1 Ret	DON; 2; 2	**LMS**; **1**; 3	LMS; 2; 1	CAT; 1; 10	CAT; 2; 7			3rd	90

=== Complete Japanese Formula 3 results ===
(key) (Races in bold indicate pole position) (Races in italics indicate fastest lap)

Year	Team	Engine	1	2	3	4	5	6	7	8	9	10	11	12	13	14	15	16	17	18	DC	Pts
2008	Petronas Team TOM'S	Toyota	FUJ; 1; 2	FUJ; 2; 2	AUT; 1; 3	**AUT**; **2**; 3	SUZ; 1; 3	SUZ; 2; 1	**MOT**; **1**; 1	**MOT**; **2**; 2	OKA; 1; 2	**OKA**; **2**; 1	**SUZ**; **1**; 1	**SUZ**; **2**; 1	MOT; 1; 1	MOT; 2; 2	**FUJ**; **1**; 1	**FUJ**; **2**; 2	**SUG**; **1**; 1	**SUG**; **2**; 1	1st	322

=== Superleague Formula record ===
(key)

==== 2009 ====
(Races in bold indicate pole position) (Races in italics indicate fastest lap)

Year	Team	Operator	1	2	3	4		5		6		Position	Points
2009	PSV Eindhoven	Azerti Motorsport	MAG	ZOL	DON	EST		MOZ		JAR		18th	145
2009	PSV Eindhoven	Azerti Motorsport				10	10	16	8	12	17	18th	145

==== 2009 Super Final Results ====
- Super Final results in 2009 did not count for points towards the main championship.

Year	Team	1	2	3	4	5	6
2009	**PSV Eindhoven**; **Azerti Motorsport**	MAG	ZOL	DON	EST; DNQ	MOZ; N/A	JAR; DNQ

=== Complete Super GT results ===
Year	Team	Car	Class	1	2	3	4	5	6	7	8	9	DC	Pts
2008	TOM'S	Lexus SC430	GT500	SUZ	OKA	FUJ	SEP	SUG	SUZ; 3	MOT			20th	11
2008	Cusco Racing	Subaru Impreza WRX STI	GT300								AUT; 6	FUJ; 3	23rd	16
2010	SARD	Lexus SC430	GT500	SUZ	OKA	FUJ	SEP	SUG	SUZ	FUJ	MOT; 11		NC	0
2011	Direction Racing	Porsche 911 GT3-R	GT300	OKA	FUJ; DNQ	SEP	SUG; 14	SUZ; Ret	FUJ; 16				24th	1
2011	LMP Motorsport	Ferrari F430 GTC	GT300							AUT; 10	MOT; 14		24th	1
2012	Honda Racing	Honda HSV-010 GT	GT500	OKA; 7	FUJ; 9	SEP; 1	SUG; 7	SUZ; 8	FUJ; Ret	AUT; 9	MOT; 7		6th	40
2013	Cars Tokai Dream28	McLaren MP4-12C GT3	GT300	OKA	FUJ	SEP	SUG	SUZ; 18	FUJ	FUJ	AUT	MOT	NC	0
2014	Audi Sport Team Hitotsuyama	Audi R8 LMS ultra	GT300	OKA	FUJ; 14	AUT	SUG	FUJ	SUZ	BUR	MOT		NC	0

=== Complete Blancpain GT Series Sprint Cup results ===
Year	Team	Car	Class	1	2	3	4	5	6	7	8	9	10	Pos.	Points
2017	Kessel Racing TP12	Ferrari 488 GT3	Pro-Am	MIS; QR; 17	MIS; CR; 19	BRH; QR; 26	BRH; CR; 20	**ZOL**; **QR**; 18	ZOL; CR; 19	HUN; QR; 19	HUN; CR; 16	NÜR; QR; 26	NÜR; CR; 20	2nd	119
2018	TP 12 - Kessel Racing	Ferrari 488 GT3	Pro-Am	**ZOL**; **1**; 12	**ZOL**; **2**; 10	**BRH**; **1**; 14	BRH; 2; 13	MIS; 1; 13	MIS; 2; 14	**HUN**; **1**; 17	**HUN**; **2**; 21	**NÜR**; **1** Ret	**NÜR**; **2**; 13	2nd	126

=== Complete 24 Hours of Nürburgring results ===
Year	Team	Co-Drivers	Car	Class	Laps	Pos.	Class Pos.
2009	Volkswagen Motorsport	(Germany) Alfrid Heger (China) Cheng Congfu (France) Franck Mailleux	Volkswagen Scirocco GT24	SP3T	149	20th	3rd
2011	Subaru Tecnica International	(Japan) Toshihiro Yoshida (Japan) Kota Sasaki (Germany) Marcel Engels	Subaru Impreza WRX	SP3T	142	21st	1st
2012	Subaru Tecnica International	(Japan) Toshihiro Yoshida (Japan) Kota Sasaki (Germany) Marcel Engels	Subaru GVB	SP3T	133	28th	1st
2013	Subaru Tecnica International	(Japan) Toshihiro Yoshida (Japan) Kota Sasaki (Germany) Marcel Lasée	Subaru GVB	SP3T	80	26th	2nd
2014	Subaru Tecnica International	(Japan) Toshihiro Yoshida (Japan) Kota Sasaki (Germany) Marcel Lasée	Subaru WRX STI	SP3T	138	32nd	4th
2015	Subaru Tecnica International	(Japan) Hideki Yamauchi (Germany) Tim Schrick (Germany) Marcel Lasée	Subaru WRX STI	SP3T	143	18th	1st
2016	Subaru Tecnica International	(Japan) Hideki Yamauchi (Germany) Tim Schrick (Germany) Marcel Lasée	Subaru WRX STI	SP3T	121	20th	1st
2017	Subaru Tecnica International	(Japan) Hideki Yamauchi (Germany) Tim Schrick (Germany) Marcel Lasée	Subaru WRX STI	SP3T	126	Ret.	Ret.
2018	Subaru Tecnica International	(Japan) Hideki Yamauchi (Germany) Tim Schrick (Japan) Takuto Iguchi	Subaru WRX STI	SP3T	112	62nd	1st
2019	Subaru Tecnica International	(Japan) Hideki Yamauchi (Germany) Tim Schrick (Japan) Takuto Iguchi	Subaru WRX STI	SP3T	145	19th	1st

Sporting positions
Preceded by Ho-Pin Tung	German Formula Three Champion; 2007	Succeeded by Frédéric Vervisch
Preceded by Kazuya Oshima	All-Japan Formula Three; Champion; 2008	Succeeded by Marcus Ericsson
