= 2009 Formula Nippon Championship =

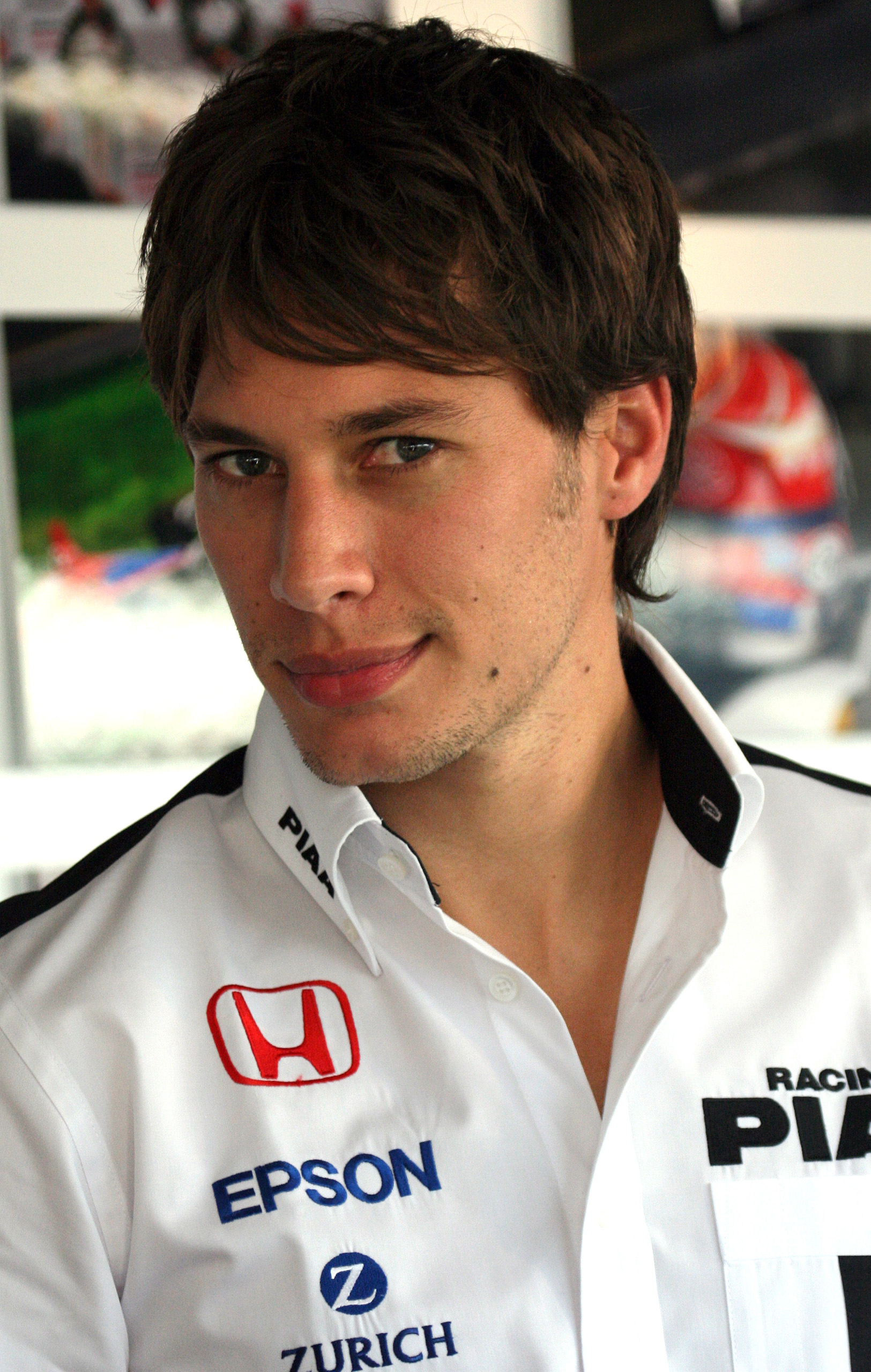
France's Loïc Duval won the title for Nakajima Racing.

The 2009 Formula Nippon Championship was the thirty-seventh season of the premier Japanese open-wheel motor racing series. The series for Formula Nippon racing cars was contested over eight rounds. Nakajima Racing's Loïc Duval claimed four victories en route to the championship, ending a six-year streak of championships by the Impul team.

This season saw a significant reduction in the number of entries compared to the previous season, dropping from around 20 to 13.

== Teams and drivers ==
- All drivers competed in Swift 017.n chassis and Honda HR09E or Toyota RV8K engines.

Team	#	Driver	Engine
Lawson Team Impul	1	(Japan) Tsugio Matsuda	Toyota RV8K
Lawson Team Impul	2	(France) Benoît Tréluyer	Toyota RV8K
Team LeMans	7	(Japan) Keisuke Kunimoto	Toyota RV8K
Team LeMans	8	(Japan) Hiroaki Ishiura	Toyota RV8K
HFPD Racing	10	(Japan) Koudai Tsukakoshi	Honda HR09E
ahead Team Impul	20	(Japan) Kohei Hirate	Toyota RV8K
Nakajima Racing	31	(France) Loïc Duval	Honda HR09E
Nakajima Racing	32	(Japan) Takashi Kogure	Honda HR09E
Petronas Team TOM'S	36	(Germany) André Lotterer	Toyota RV8K
Petronas Team TOM'S	37	(Japan) Kazuya Oshima	Toyota RV8K
DoCoMo Team Dandelion Racing	40	(United Kingdom) Richard Lyons	Honda HR09E
DoCoMo Team Dandelion Racing	41	(Japan) Takuya Izawa	Honda HR09E
Cerumo/Inging	48	(Japan) Yuji Tachikawa	Toyota RV8K

== Race calendar and results ==
2009 venues
- All races held in Japan.
- Okayama was replaced by Autopolis.

Round	Circuit	Date	Pole position	Fastest lap	Winning driver	Winning team
1	Fuji Speedway	5 April	(Japan) Kohei Hirate	(Germany) André Lotterer	(France) Benoît Tréluyer	Lawson Team Impul
2	Suzuka Circuit	17 May	(France) Benoît Tréluyer	(France) Loïc Duval	(France) Loïc Duval	Nakajima Racing
3	Twin Ring Motegi	31 May	(Japan) Takashi Kogure	(Japan) Koudai Tsukakoshi	(Japan) Takashi Kogure	Nakajima Racing
4	Fuji Speedway	28 June	(France) Loïc Duval	(France) Loïc Duval	(France) Loïc Duval	Nakajima Racing
5	Suzuka Circuit	12 July	(France) Loïc Duval	(Japan) Takashi Kogure	(France) Loïc Duval	Nakajima Racing
6	Twin Ring Motegi	9 August	(Japan) Takashi Kogure	(Japan) Takashi Kogure	(Germany) André Lotterer	Petronas Team TOM'S
7	Autopolis	30 August	(Japan) Takashi Kogure	(Japan) Keisuke Kunimoto	(Japan) Takashi Kogure	Nakajima Racing
8	Sportsland SUGO	27 September	(France) Loïc Duval	(France) Loïc Duval	(France) Loïc Duval	Nakajima Racing

== Championship standings ==
=== Drivers' Championship ===
Scoring system

Position	1st	2nd	3rd	4th	5th	6th	7th	8th	Pole
Points	10	8	6	5	4	3	2	1	1

Pos	Driver	FUJ	SUZ	MOT	FUJ	SUZ	MOT	AUT	SUG	Points
1	(France) Loïc Duval	4	1	Ret	**1**	**1**	2	3	**1**	62
2	(France) Benoît Tréluyer	1	**2**	2	Ret	3	3	8	9	40
3	(Germany) André Lotterer	10	3	5	8	7	1	2	2	39
4	(Japan) Takashi Kogure	8	Ret	**1**	7	2	**6**	**1**	10	37
5	(Japan) Kohei Hirate	**3**	4	Ret	5	5	8	4	3	32
6	(Japan) Hiroaki Ishiura	11	8	3	4	4	4	5	5	30
7	(Japan) Koudai Tsukakoshi	6	5	4	6	9	10	Ret	4	20
8	(Japan) Takuya Izawa	2	7	Ret	Ret	8	9	6	11	14
9	(Japan) Kazuya Oshima	7	Ret	Ret	2	10	11	9	6	13
10	(United Kingdom) Richard Lyons	Ret	6	7	3	13	Ret	10	13	11
11	(Japan) Tsugio Matsuda	Ret	Ret	6	Ret	12	5	7	7	11
12	(Japan) Yuji Tachikawa	5	Ret	Ret	9	6	7	Ret	12	9
13	(Japan) Keisuke Kunimoto	9	9	Ret	10	11	Ret	11	8	1
Pos	Driver	FUJ	SUZ	MOT	FUJ	SUZ	MOT	AUT	SUG	Points

Colour	Result
Gold	Winner
Silver	Second place
Bronze	Third place
Green	Points classification
Blue	Non-points classification
Blue	Non-classified finish (NC)
Purple	Retired, not classified (Ret)
Red	Did not qualify (DNQ)
Red	Did not pre-qualify (DNPQ)
Black	Disqualified (DSQ)
White	Did not start (DNS)
White	Withdrew (WD)
White	Race cancelled (C)
Blank	Did not practice (DNP)
Blank	Did not arrive (DNA)
Blank	Excluded (EX)

**Bold** – Pole
Italics – Fastest Lap

=== Teams' Championship ===
Scoring system

Position	1st	2nd	3rd	4th	5th	6th	7th	8th
Points	10	8	6	5	4	3	2	1

Pos	Team	Car	FUJ	SUZ	MOT	FUJ	SUZ	MOT	AUT	SUG	Pts
1	Nakajima Racing	31	4	1	Ret	**1**	**1**	2	3	**1**	93
1	Nakajima Racing	32	8	Ret	**1**	7	2	**6**	**1**	10	93
2	Petronas Team TOM'S	36	10	3	5	8	7	1	2	2	52
2	Petronas Team TOM'S	37	7	Ret	Ret	2	10	11	9	6	52
3	Lawson Team Impul	1	Ret	Ret	6	Ret	12	5	7	7	50
3	Lawson Team Impul	2	1	**2**	2	Ret	3	3	8	9	50
4	ahead Team Impul	20	**3**	4	Ret	5	5	8	4	3	31
5	Team LeMans	7	9	9	Ret	10	11	Ret	11	8	31
5	Team LeMans	8	11	8	3	4	4	4	5	5	31
6	Dandelion Racing	40	Ret	6	7	3	13	Ret	10	13	25
6	Dandelion Racing	41	2	7	Ret	Ret	8	9	6	11	25
7	HFDP Racing	10	6	5	4	6	9	10	Ret	4	20
8	Cerumo/Inging	48	5	Ret	Ret	9	6	7	Ret	12	9
