= 2008 Macau Grand Prix =

Formula Three motor race

Race details
Date	16 November 2008
Official name	55th Windsor Arch Macau Grand Prix
Location	Guia Circuit, Macau
Course	Temporary street circuit 6.120 km (3.803 mi)
Distance	Qualifying Race; 10 laps, 61.200 km (38.028 mi); Main Race; 15 laps, 91.800 km (57.042 mi)
Weather	Qualifying Race: Sunny and dry Main Race: Sunny and dry
- Qualifying Race

Pole
Driver	(Netherlands) Carlo van Dam	TOM'S
Time	2:11.846

Fastest Lap
Driver	(New Zealand) Brendon Hartley	Carlin
Time	2:13.169 (on lap 6 of 10)

Podium
First	(Italy) Edoardo Mortara	Signature-Plus
Second	(Japan) Keisuke Kunimoto	TOM'S
Third	(Brazil) Roberto Streit	Räikkönen Robertson Racing
- Main Race

Pole
Driver	(Italy) Edoardo Mortara	Signature-Plus

Fastest Lap
Driver	(New Zealand) Brendon Hartley	Carlin
Time	2:12.565 (on lap 15 of 15)

Podium
First	(Japan) Keisuke Kunimoto	TOM'S
Second	(Italy) Edoardo Mortara	Signature-Plus
Third	(New Zealand) Brendon Hartley	Carlin

The 2008 Macau Grand Prix (formally the 55th Windsor Arch Macau Grand Prix) was a Formula Three (F3) car race held on the streets of Macau on 16 November 2008. Unlike other races, such as the Masters of Formula 3, the 2008 Macau Grand Prix was not part of any F3 championship, but was open to entries from any F3 championship. The event consisted of two races: a ten-lap qualifying race that set the starting grid for the fifteen-lap main race. The 2008 race was the 55th Macau Grand Prix and the 26th for F3 cars.

TOM'S driver Keisuke Kunimoto won the Grand Prix on his debut in Macau, after finishing second in the previous day's Qualification Race won by Signature-Plus driver Edoardo Mortara. Kunimoto led from the start and held on to become the first Japanese driver to win in Macau since Takuma Sato in 2001, and it was TOM'S second consecutive victory in the Grand Prix. Mortara finished second, with Carlin driver Brendon Hartley in third.

== Background and entry list ==
The Macau Grand Prix is a Formula Three (F3) race considered to be a stepping stone to higher motor racing categories such as Formula One and has been termed the territory's most prestigious international sporting event. The 2008 Macau Grand Prix was the event's 55th running and the 26th time it was held to F3 rules. It took place on the 6.2 km (3.9 mi) 22-turn Guia Circuit on 16 November 2008 with three preceding days of practice and qualifying.

Drivers had to race in a Fédération Internationale de l'Automobile (FIA)-regulated championship meeting in 2008, either in the FIA Formula 3 International Trophy or one of the domestic championships, with the highest-placed drivers earning priority in being invited to the race. Two of the four major F3 series were represented on the 30-car grid by their respective champions. Nico Hülkenberg, the Formula 3 Euro Series champion, missed the race because he was entered in a GP2 Series test session at the Circuit Paul Ricard. Thus, Edoardo Mortara was the highest placed Formula 3 Euro Series competitor in Macau, joined by British champion Jaime Alguersuari and Japanese series winner Carlo van Dam. Laurens Vanthoor was the top performing driver in the German championship, and the Australian Drivers' Championship winner James Winslow accepted an invitation to race in Macau from race organisers. The race featured three drivers from outside of F3: Eurocup Formula Renault 2.0 racer Roberto Merhi, Roberto Streit of Formula Nippon and Formula V6 Asia driver Michael Ho.

== Practice and qualifying ==
The Sunday race was preceded by two half-hour practice sessions: one on Thursday morning and one on Friday morning. Despite making a minor error on the lap, Mortara was fastest for Signature-Plus at 2 minutes, 14.333 seconds late in the session, seven-tenths of a second faster than anyone else on the circuit. He was followed by Renger van der Zande, Streit, Van Dam, James Jakes, Stefano Coletti, Alguersuari, Merhi and the British duo of Jon Lancaster and Sam Bird. During the session, where the top of the time sheets was shared by multiple drivers, Brendon Hartley missed the second half due to a gearbox problem. Mika Mäki crashed heavily at Fisherman's Bend, requiring red flags before the session's halfway point. Kazuya Oshima and Walter Grubmüller went into the wall separately at Maternity Bend. Mäki was transported to the circuit's medical centre for precautionary checks after complaining of abdominal pains and was advised to rest.

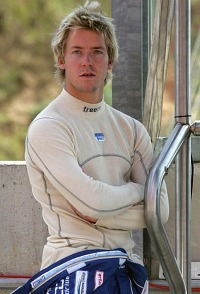
Sam Bird (pictured in 2007) qualified alongside Carlo van Dam on the front row of the grid but was demoted three places because of a grid penalty.

Qualifying was split into two 45-minute sessions, one on Thursday afternoon and one on Friday afternoon. Each driver's fastest time from either session counted toward their final starting place in the qualification race. Mortara was fastest in the first qualifying session, held in warm and sunny weather, with a time of 2 minutes, 12.416 seconds, and led throughout. Van Dam in second was three-tenths of a second slower. Streit was second twice but finished third. Hartley recovered from gearbox problems earlier in the day to run strongly for provisional fourth place. Van Der Zande was consistent and took fifth. He was followed by the highest-placed rookie Alguersuari in sixth. Bird was seventh. Jules Bianchi and his teammate Jakes were eighth and tenth, separated by Oliver Turvey. Marcus Ericsson, eleventh, was high as sixth in the session's opening minutes. Following him were Keisuke Kunimoto, Kei Cozzolino, Coletti, the Hitech Racing duo of Max Chilton and Merhi, Winslow, Grubmüller, Oshima and Daniel Campos-Hull, Laurens Vanthoor, Atte Mustonen, Basil Shaaban, Cheng Congfu, Lancaster, Masaki Matsushita, Ho and Nicola de Marco. The only driver to go under the minimum qualification time was Koki Saga. The session was stopped three times. Jakes' car got unsettled on the tarmac entering Fisherman's Bend on a faster lap and hit the outside barriers, littering the track with debris. De Marco struck the Fisherman's Bend barriers and angled across the circuit. Matsushita spun towards the track's centre after hitting the barriers at Police corner with one minute left. Mortara and Vanthoor could not avoid his stranded car and piled into it. For ignoring the red light signal which mandated he enter the weighbridge, the stewards order Matsushita to start last for the qualification race.

Mäki returned to the circuit on the morning of the second 30-minute practice session and was declared fit to compete. He revealed that he had food poisoning which worsened while driving and combated this by sleeping heavily the previous day. The start was delayed by 50 minutes due to multiple crashes in practice for the touring car support races. Mortara concentrated on race setup and set a benchmark time of 2 minutes, 13.054 seconds by slipstreaming another car into Mandarin Bend. Van Dam was 0.117 seconds slower in second and a full second faster than Cozzolino in third. Alguersuari, Turvey, Merhi, Hartley, Ericsson, Van Der Zande ninth and Streit were in positions four to ten. De Marco spun at Fisherman's Bend, stopping practice as he was adjudged to be in a dangerous place. Alguersuari damaged his car's left side and removed his rear wing in a crash against the San Francisco End barriers which halted the session for a second time. The two other incidents during the session were Mäki suffered a puncture and spent most of the session in the pit lane, while Van Dam braked late for Lisboa corner and stopped on the escape road.

Van Dam improved on Mortara's lap from the first qualifying session until Mustonen went off the track at Police corner and the yellow flags flew. Drivers with new tyres had them fitted and adjusted their cars halfway through the second qualifying session. Matsushita then crashed near Police turn, and his car was removed from the track. Mortara then regained provisional pole, until the session was stopped when Bianchi ran wide exiting the Reservoir Bend and hit the tyre barriers at the end of the turn. His left rear wheel flew onto the track's centre. Bird was the first driver all weekend to go under 2 minutes, 11 seconds, before red flags were needed for Cozzolino whose heavy crash at Fisherman's Bend left debris on the track. Van Dam slightly deranged his steering arm at the restart, but used a clear track to beat Bird and take pole position with a 2-minute, 11.846 second lap. This demoted Bird to second having been delayed by a slow-moving Grubmüller. Kunimoto used the slipstream of another car to take third, while the previous day's provisional pole sitter Mortara was fourth. Streit dropped two spots to fifth, while Merhi climbed nine spots to sixth. Van Der Zande in seventh did not slipstream other cars to avoid being delayed in the track's tight section. Turvey was as high as third but was eighth with Alguersuari ninth and Jakes tenth. The rest of the field lined up as Hartley, Coletti (who crashed at Police turn and blocked the track), Chilton, Mäki, Ericsson, Oshimi, Bianchi, Cozzolino, Grubmüller, Cheng, Campos-Hull, Winslow, Lancaster, Shabban, Saga, Mustonen, Vanthoor (who set no lap time as he crashed on his out-lap), Matsushita, Ho and De Marco. Bird was demoted three positions on the grid after qualifying for failing to signal to enter the weighbridge during second practice.

=== Qualifying classification ===
Each of the driver's fastest lap times from the two qualifying sessions are denoted in bold.

Final qualifying classification
Pos	No.	Driver	Team	Q1 Time	Rank	Q2 Time	Rank	Gap	Grid
1	1	(Netherlands) Carlo van Dam	TOM'S	2:12.772	2	**2:11.846**	1	—	1
2	21	(United Kingdom) Sam Bird	Manor Motorsport	2:13.722	7	**2:11.988**	2	+0.142	5^{1}
3	2	(Japan) Keisuke Kunimoto	TOM'S	2:14.696	12	**2:12.039**	3	+0.293	2
4	7	(Italy) Edoardo Mortara	Signature-Plus	2:12.416	1	**2:12.044**	4	+0.298	3
5	11	(Brazil) Roberto Streit	Räikkönen Robertson Racing	2:13.153	3	**2:12.061**	5	+0.315	4
6	20	(Spain) Roberto Merhi	Hitech Racing	2:15.574	16	**2:12.369**	6	+0.618	6
7	16	(Netherlands) Renger van der Zande	Prema Powerteam	2:13.607	5	**2:12.402**	7	+0.653	7
8	3	(United Kingdom) Oliver Turvey	Carlin	2:14.208	9	**2:12.404**	8	+0.655	8
9	4	(Spain) Jaime Alguersuari	Carlin	2:13.669	6	**2:12.412**	9	+0.661	9
10	15	(United Kingdom) James Jakes	ART Grand Prix	2:14.459	10	**2:12.423**	10	+0.672	10
11	5	(New Zealand) Brendon Hartley	Carlin	2:13.348	4	**2:12.573**	11	+0.722	11
12	17	(Monaco) Stefano Coletti	Prema Powerteam	2:14.788	14	**2:12.835**	12	+0.984	12
13	18	(United Kingdom) Max Chilton	Hitech Racing	2:15.007	15	**2:12.869**	13	+1.018	13
14	9	(Finland) Mika Mäki	Signature-Plus	no time	DNQ	**2:12.942**	14	+1.091	14
15	6	(Sweden) Marcus Ericsson	Carlin	2:14.664	11	**2:12.988**	15	+1.135	15
16	22	(Japan) Kazuya Oshima	Manor Motorsport	2:15.985	19	**2:13.110**	16	+1.157	16
17	14	(France) Jules Bianchi	ART Grand Prix	2:13.840	8	**2:13.124**	17	+1.171	17
18	24	(Italy) Kei Cozzolino	Now Motor Sports	2:14.779	13	**2:13.504**	18	+1.551	18
19	19	(Austria) Walter Grubmüller	Hitech Racing	2:15.731	18	**2:13.710**	19	+1.757	19
20	8	(China) Cheng Congfu	Signature-Plus	2:17.050	24	**2:13.777**	20	+1.844	20
21	28	(Spain) Daniel Campos-Hull	HBR Motorsport	2:16.345	20	**2:14.325**	21	+2.392	21
22	27	(United Kingdom) James Winslow	Ombra Racing	2:15.638	17	**2:14.399**	22	+2.466	22
23	23	(United Kingdom) Jon Lancaster	Manor Motorsport	2:17.490	25	**2:14.620**	23	+2.687	23
24	29	(Lebanon) Basil Shaaban	HBR Motorsport	2:16.939	23	**2:15.412**	24	+3.479	24
25	25	(Japan) Koki Saga	Le Beausset Motorsports	2:26.492	DNQ	**2:15.969**	25	+4.036	25
26	10	(Finland) Atte Mustonen	Räikkönen Robertson Racing	2:16.675	22	**2:16.029**	26	+4.096	26
27	30	(Belgium) Laurens Vanthoor	RC Motorsport	**2:16.464**	21	no time	DNQ	+4.531	27
28	26	(Japan) Masaki Matsushita	PTRS by Ombra	**2:18.059**	26	2:18.667	25	+6.126	30^{2}
29	12	(Macau) Michael Ho	Räikkönen Robertson Racing	2:18.415	27	**2:18.606**	27	+5.078	28
30	31	(Italy) Nicola de Marco	RC Motorsport	**2:18.668**	28	no time	DNQ	+5.140	29
110% qualifying time: 2:25.657
**Bold time** indicates the faster of the two times that determined the grid order.

Notes:

- **^1** – Sam Bird was penalised three places on the grid for failing to obey a signal to enter the weighbridge during the second practice session.
- **^2** – Masaki Matsushita was relegated to the back of the grid after ignoring a signal to enter the weighbridge during the first qualifying session.

== Qualifying race ==
The qualifying race to set the starting order for the main race began on 15 November at Macau Standard Time (UTC+08:00). The weather was dry and sunny at the start of the qualifying race with an air temperature of 23 °C (73 °F) and a track temperature at 37 °C (99 °F). Van Dam made a slow start and Kunimoto passed him for the lead. Van Dam attempted to reclaim the lead from Kunimoto, but ran wide and punctured his left rear tyre due to contact with the barriers through Mandarin corner. Mortara then attempted, but failed, to overtake Kunimoto; the two narrowly avoided a collision. Four more cars overtook Van Dam into Lisboa turn, and he collided with fellow countryman Van Der Zande at San Francisco Bend. Both drivers retired because of the contact. Merhi stalled on the grid and lost several positions. On the second lap, Jakes and Hartley brushed up against each other as they drove towards the Reservoir Bend. Jakes went across Hartley's front and into the wall. Hartley entered the pit lane with suspension damage while Jakes retired.

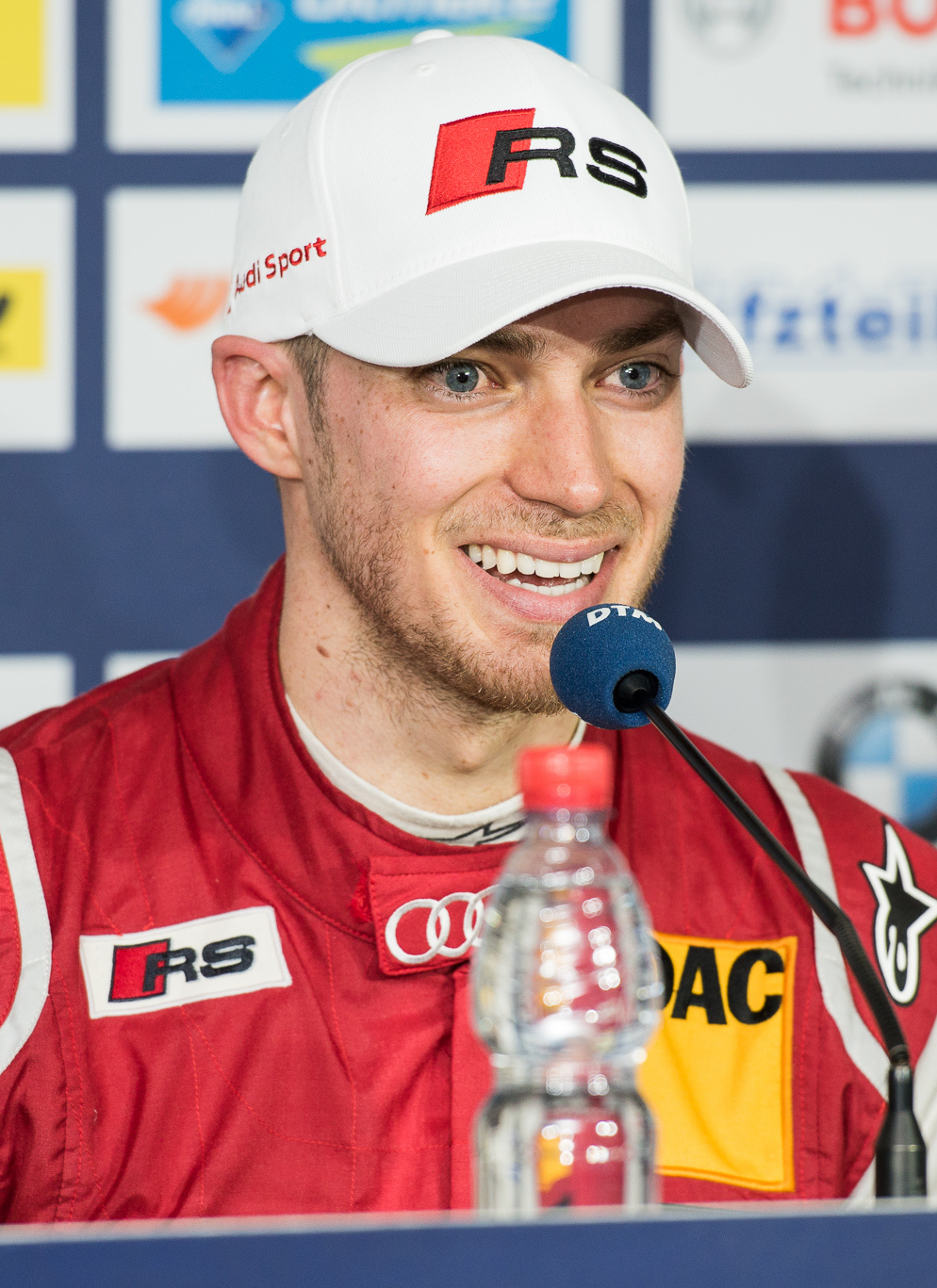
Edoardo Mortara (pictured in 2014) won the qualifying race and pole position in the Grand Prix itself.

When Bianchi spun entering the Lisboa turn, a multi-car collision occurred. He set off a chain reaction involving Grubmüller, Chilton, and Merhi's Hitech cars. Bianchi's spin triggered a secondary accident, which began when Shaaban ran into the rear of his teammate Campos-Hull and was spun into Cheng. Mustonen was pushed into the track barriers by both drivers. While Merhi and Grubmüller rejoined, Chilton, Bianchi, Cheng and Mustonen retired. Because several cars were in the opposite direction and beached on the kerbs, the safety car was deployed so that marshals could clear the wreckage. Merhi made a pit stop and Oshima retired. The safety car remained on track for three laps and Kunimoto led at the restart with Mortara in second. Shaaban set the fastest lap earlier in the race but retired after crashing at Reservoir turn. Mortara began to attack Kunimoto in an attempt to take the lead, but Kunimoto resisted. Streit was close behind the two drivers, defending against Turvey, who was distracted by Bird, who was battling Alguersuari.

At the race's halfway point, Ho lost control of his car at Police corner, but this did not cause a traffic jam because only Matsushita was behind him and easily passed him. Mortara slipstreamed Kunimoto's, steered left onto the outside line, and brake later than him for the lead at the start of lap seven. Mortara began to pull away from Kunimoto, while Streit gained on the latter while observing Turvey behind him. Mäki's car was damaged at the Reservoir Bend on the ninth lap, and debris littered the track. Despite a rear puncture and a detached rear wing, he continued driving and went off the track twice. Mortara kept the lead for the rest of the race to win pole position for the Grand Prix itself. He was joined on the grid's front row by Kunimoto and Streit completed the podium. Turvey, Bird, Alguersuari, Coletti, Ericsson, Campos-Hull and Cozzolino, Winslow, Vanthoor, Lancaster, Saga, Grubmüller, Mäki, Merhi, Matushita, De Marco and Hartley were the last of the 20 classified finishers.

=== Qualification Race classification ===
Final qualifying race classification
Pos	No.	Driver	Team	Laps	Time/Retired	Grid
1	7	(Italy) Edoardo Mortara	Signature-Plus	10	29:20.769	3
2	2	(Japan) Keisuke Kunimoto	TOM'S	10	+1.189	2
3	11	(Brazil) Roberto Streit	Räikkönen Robertson Racing	10	+2.904	4
4	3	(United Kingdom) Oliver Turvey	Carlin	10	+3.364	8
5	21	(United Kingdom) Sam Bird	Manor Motorsport	10	+3.984	5
6	4	(Spain) Jaime Alguersuari	Carlin	10	+4.623	9
7	17	(Monaco) Stefano Coletti	Prema Powerteam	10	+4.952	12
8	6	(Sweden) Marcus Ericsson	Carlin	10	+8.799	15
9	28	(Spain) Daniel Campos-Hull	HBR Motorsport	10	+22.448	21
10	24	(Italy) Kei Cozzolino	Now Motor Sports	10	+23.056	18
11	27	(United Kingdom) James Winslow	Ombra Racing	10	+26.786	22
12	30	(Belgium) Laurens Vanthoor	RC Motorsport	10	+28.090	27
13	25	(Japan) Koki Saga	Le Beausset Motorsports	10	+42.871	25
14	19	(Austria) Walter Grubmüller	Hitech Racing	10	+48.578	19
15	20	(Spain) Roberto Merhi	Hitech Racing	10	+49.439	6
16	23	(United Kingdom) Jon Lancaster	Manor Motorsport	10	+57.740	23
17	26	(Japan) Masaki Matsushita	PTRS by Ombra	10	+1:06.943	30
18	31	(Italy) Nicola de Marco	RC Motorsport	10	+1:31.545	29
19	9	(Finland) Mika Mäki	Signature-Plus	10	+1:44.930	14
NC	5	(New Zealand) Brendon Hartley	Carlin	7	+3 laps	11
Ret	12	(Macau) Michael Ho	Räikkönen Robertson Racing	4	Accident	28
Ret	29	(Lebanon) Basil Shaaban	HBR Motorsport	3	Accident	24
Ret	22	(Japan) Kazuya Oshima	Manor Motorsport	3	Accident	16
Ret	18	(United Kingdom) Max Chilton	Hitech Racing	0	Accident	13
Ret	16	(Netherlands) Renger van der Zande	Prema Powerteam	0	Accident	7
Ret	15	(United Kingdom) James Jakes	ART Grand Prix	0	Accident	10
Ret	10	(Finland) Atte Mustonen	Räikkönen Robertson Racing	0	Accident	26
Ret	8	(China) Cheng Congfu	Signature-Plus	0	Accident	20
Ret	1	(Netherlands) Carlo van Dam	TOM'S	0	Accident	1
Ret	14	(France) Jules Bianchi	ART Grand Prix	0	Accident	17
Fastest lap: Brendon Hartley, 2:13.169, 165.444 km/h (102.802 mph) on lap 6

== Warm-up ==
A 20-minute warm-up session was held on the morning of the main race. Hartley ran faster than in any previous session, topping the time sheets with a new fastest lap of the weekend of 2 minutes, 11.071 seconds. He was six-tenths of a second faster than Van Dam in second. The two were followed by Coletti, Ericsson, Bird, Mortara, Cozzolino, Streit, Alguersuari and Campos-Hull in positions four through ten.

== Main race ==
The race began on 16 November at 15:30 local time. The weather at the start was dry and sunny with an air temperature of 26 °C (79 °F) and a track temperature of 33 °C (91 °F). When the Grand Prix started, Kunimoto accelerated faster than Mortara off the line and passed him driving towards Lisboa corner. Turvey stalled, causing confusion as drivers swerved to avoid hitting him. Vanthoor yielded six places as his clutch slipped but avoided stalling his engine. Streit defended against Bird and they collided in Mandarin Bend. Streit's car crossed over Bird's and slid into the right-band barriers. Entering the corner, he severely damaged his car before rebounding off the wall and veering left. Soon after, Ericsson went off the track into Lisboa corner and several cars piled up behind him or had to negotiate their way past his stricken vehicle. The safety car was immediately deployed to control the race by picking up Kunimoto. The wreckage was cleared in two laps, and Kunimoto led at the restart, followed by Mortara. Saga became the race's fourth retirement when he hit the wall at Lisboa corner. Campos-Hull slipstreamed past Alguersuari for third place into Lisboa corner just as Mortara locked his brakes on the bumpy track.

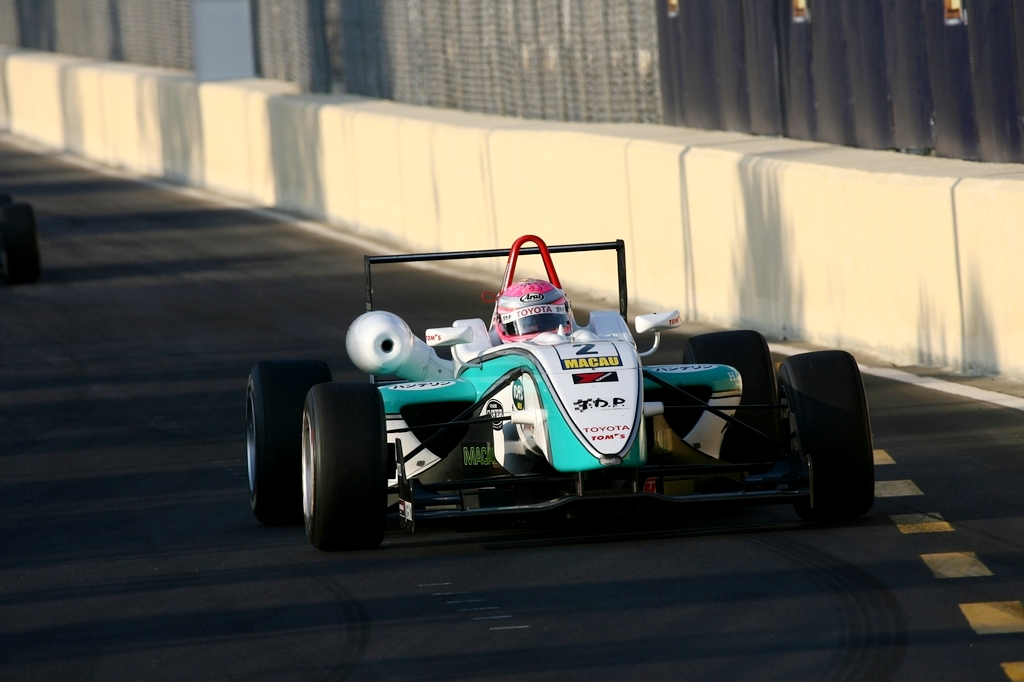
Keisuke Kunimoto (pictured during the race) took the first win for a Japanese driver in Macau since Takuma Sato seven years previously.

Mortara's brake locking dropped him to fourth behind Campos-Hull and Alguersuari. Meanwhile, Kunimoto began to pull away from every driver. Alguersuari re-passed Campos-Hull for second on the fifth lap, and Mortara passed the latter for third the following lap. As he began gaining on Kunimoto, Alguersuari's chances of winning were diminished when he was deemed to have jumped the start and was told he would incur a drive-through penalty. At the end of lap five, Alguersuari took his penalty, and Mortara began reducing Kunimoto's 2.5-second lead. As the race appeared to be settling down, Matsushita crashed into the wall after leaving the Mandarin Bend, temporarily blocking the track. Winslow drifted off the track at Police turn and hit the wall. Lancaster relinquished sixth place to Hartley, while Mäki moved into the top ten. On lap eight, Merhi spun at Reservoir Bend and severely damaged his car, prompting the safety car's deployment. The incident caught the recovering Van Dam off guard who clipped debris and crashed. Kunimoto's lead had faded, and he was followed by Mortara, Campos-Hull, Cozzolino, and Hartley.

The race restarted on the tenth lap, with Kunimoto leading. Mortara could not keep up with Kunimoto because the latter had more straightline speed. In trying to keep up with Kunimoto, Mortara ran wide at Matsuya corner, bending his right-front suspension from contact with the wall, and Campos-Hull challenged him. Further back, Mäki in sixth was holding off Van Der Zande. Shabban was another retiree after crashing off the track and into the barriers at Lisboa corner. Turvey recovered to move into the top ten, while teammate Hartley remained in fifth to observe any of Mortara's, Campos-Hull, and Cozzolino's mistakes. Despite drifting off the track and returning, Coletti crashed into the barriers at Hospital corner and was the race's final retirement. On the 13th lap, Cozzolino tried to overtake Campos-Hull but struck the rear of the latter's car braking for Lisboa corner and dropped out of the top ten. The crash promoted Hartley to third. Hartley and Turvey traded the fastest lap until Hartley claimed it on the final lap by completing a circuit in 2 minutes, 12.565 seconds.

Turvey passed Grubmüller for seventh on the final lap. Kunimoto won on his debut in Macau, achieving the first win for a Japanese driver in Macau since Takuma Sato won the 2001 race, and it was TOM'S second consecutive Macau Grand Prix victory. Mortara finished second, 1.710 seconds later, and Hartley finished third, climbing 17 places from his starting position. Mäki finished fourth, followed by Van Der Zande in fifth, both having been separated from the lead group throughout the race. Vanthoor finished sixth after starting thirteenth, just ahead of seventh-placed Turvey. The top ten was completed by Grubmüller, Bianchi and Alguersuari. Lancaster finished eleventh, two places ahead of his starting position. Jakes Cheng, Chilton. Cozzolino, Oshima, Campos-Hull, Mustonen, De Marco and Ho were the final classified finishers.

=== Main Race classification ===
Final main race classification
Pos	No.	Driver	Team	Laps	Time/Retired	Grid
1	2	(Japan) Keisuke Kunimoto	TOM'S	15	41:01.864	2
2	7	(Italy) Edoardo Mortara	Signature-Plus	15	+1.710	1
3	5	(New Zealand) Brendon Hartley	Carlin	15	+4.006	20
4	9	(Finland) Mika Mäki	Signature-Plus	15	+8.442	19
5	16	(Netherlands) Renger van der Zande	Prema Powerteam	15	+10.276	25
6	30	(Belgium) Laurens Vanthoor	RC Motorsport	15	+12.975	12
7	3	(United Kingdom) Oliver Turvey	Carlin	15	+13.134	4
8	19	(Austria) Walter Grubmüller	Hitech Racing	15	+14.695	14
9	14	(France) Jules Bianchi	ART Grand Prix	15	+18.725	30
10	4	(Spain) Jaime Alguersuari	Carlin	15	+20.801	6
11	23	(United Kingdom) Jon Lancaster	Manor Motorsport	15	+20.898	16
12	15	(United Kingdom) James Jakes	ART Grand Prix	15	+21.418	26
13	8	(China) Cheng Congfu	Signature-Plus	15	+22.404	28
14	18	(United Kingdom) Max Chilton	Hitech Racing	15	+22.604	27
15	24	(Italy) Kei Cozzolino	Now Motor Sports	15	+23.270	10
16	22	(Japan) Kazuya Oshima	Manor Motorsport	15	+23.930	23
17	28	(Spain) Daniel Campos-Hull	HBR Motorsport	15	+24.997	9
18	10	(Finland) Atte Mustonen	Räikkönen Robertson Racing	15	+33.744	29
19	31	(Italy) Nicola de Marco	RC Motorsport	15	+46.527	18
20	12	(Macau) Michael Ho	Räikkönen Robertson Racing	15	+51.739	21
Ret	17	(Monaco) Stefano Coletti	Prema Powerteam	11	Accident	7
Ret	29	(Lebanon) Basil Shaaban	HBR Motorsport	10	Accident	22
Ret	1	(Netherlands) Carlo van Dam	TOM'S	7	Accident	24
Ret	20	(Spain) Roberto Merhi	Hitech Racing	6	Accident	15
Ret	26	(Japan) Masaki Matsushita	PTRS by Ombra	6	Accident	17
Ret	27	(United Kingdom) James Winslow	Ombra Racing	5	Accident	11
Ret	25	(Japan) Koki Saga	Le Beausset Motorsports	2	Accident	13
Ret	21	(United Kingdom) Sam Bird	Manor Motorsport	0	Accident	5
Ret	11	(Brazil) Roberto Streit	Räikkönen Robertson Racing	0	Accident	3
Ret	6	(Sweden) Marcus Ericsson	Carlin	0	Accident	8
Fastest lap: Brendon Hartley, 2:12.565, 166.198 km/h (103.271 mph) on lap 15
