= 2008 Japanese Formula 3 Championship =

Seasons
- ← 2007 2009 →

The 2008 Japanese Formula 3 Championship was the 30th edition of the Japanese Formula 3 Championship. Dutchman Carlo van Dam took the main title, with Hideki Yamauchi taking the National Class. TOM'S took their eighth constructors title in a row.

== Teams and drivers ==
Team	No	Driver	Chassis (Note: All drivers competed in Dallara chassis; model listed.)	Engine	Rounds
Championship Class
(Japan) Team TOM'S	1	(Netherlands) Carlo van Dam	F308	Toyota-TOM'S	All
(Japan) Team TOM'S	36	(Japan) Keisuke Kunimoto	F308	Toyota-TOM'S	All
(Japan) Team TOM'S	37	(Japan) Takuto Iguchi	F308	Toyota-TOM'S	All
(Japan) Toda Racing	2	(Japan) Daisuke Nakajima	F308	Mugen-Honda	All
(Japan) Team Real	7	(Japan) Naoki Yamamoto	F308	Mugen-Honda	All
(Japan) Team Real	8	(Japan) Yuhki Nakayama	F308	Mugen-Honda	All
(Japan) ThreeBond Racing	12	(Japan) Hironobu Yasuda	F308	Nismo Nissan	All
(Japan) Now Motor Sport	33	(Italy) Kei Cozzolino	F308	Toyota-TOM'S	All
(Japan) Denso Team Le Beausset	62	(Japan) Koki Saga	F308	Toyota	All
National Class
(Japan) Hanashima Racing	5	(Japan) Takashi Nagase	F306	Toyota-TOM'S	1–5
(Japan) Hanashima Racing	5	(Japan) Katsuaki Kubota	F306	Toyota-TOM'S	6–9
(Japan) Aim Sports	18	(Japan) Masaki Matsushita	F307/305	Toyota-TOM'S	All
(Hong Kong) PTRS	19	(Indonesia) Zahir Ali	F307	Toyota-TOM'S	All
(Hong Kong) PTRS	20	(Switzerland) Alexandre Imperatori	F307	Toyota-TOM'S	All
(Japan) TOM'S Spirit	38	(Japan) Hideki Yamauchi	F306	Toyota-TOM'S	All
(Japan) Denso Team Le Beausset	63	(Japan) Hideto Yasuoka	F305	Toyota	All
(Japan) Exceed Motor Sports	74	(Japan) Motoki Sakurai	F306	Toyota-TOM'S	All

== Race calendar and results ==
Round		Circuit	Date	Pole position	Fastest lap	Winning driver	Winning team	National Class winner
1	R1	Fuji Speedway	5 April	(Japan) Takuto Iguchi	(Japan) Takuto Iguchi	(Japan) Takuto Iguchi	(Japan) Team TOM'S	(Japan) Hideki Yamauchi
1	R2	Fuji Speedway	6 April	(Japan) Takuto Iguchi	(Japan) Takuto Iguchi	(Japan) Takuto Iguchi	(Japan) Team TOM'S	(Japan) Masaki Matsushita
2	R1	Autopolis	26 April	(Japan) Takuto Iguchi	(Japan) Takuto Iguchi	(Japan) Takuto Iguchi	(Japan) Team TOM'S	(Switzerland) Alexandre Imperatori
2	R2	Autopolis	27 April	(Netherlands) Carlo van Dam	(Japan) Takuto Iguchi	(Japan) Keisuke Kunimoto	(Japan) Team TOM'S	(Japan) Hideto Yasuoka
3	R1	Suzuka Circuit	10 May	(Japan) Hironobu Yasuda	(Japan) Keisuke Kunimoto	(Japan) Hironobu Yasuda	(Japan) ThreeBond Racing	(Japan) Hideki Yamauchi
3	R2	Suzuka Circuit	11 May	(Japan) Hironobu Yasuda	(Netherlands) Carlo van Dam	(Netherlands) Carlo van Dam	(Japan) Team TOM'S	(Japan) Hideki Yamauchi
4	R1	Twin Ring Motegi	24 May	(Netherlands) Carlo van Dam	(Japan) Keisuke Kunimoto	(Netherlands) Carlo van Dam	(Japan) Team TOM'S	(Japan) Hideki Yamauchi
4	R2	Twin Ring Motegi	25 May	(Netherlands) Carlo van Dam	(Italy) Kei Cozzolino	(Japan) Hironobu Yasuda	(Japan) ThreeBond Racing	(Switzerland) Alexandre Imperatori
5	R1	Okayama International Circuit	7 June	(Japan) Takuto Iguchi	(Japan) Takuto Iguchi	(Japan) Naoki Yamamoto	(Japan) Team Real	(Indonesia) Zahir Ali
5	R2	Okayama International Circuit	8 June	(Netherlands) Carlo van Dam	(Netherlands) Carlo van Dam	(Netherlands) Carlo van Dam	(Japan) Team TOM'S	(Switzerland) Alexandre Imperatori
6	R1	Suzuka Circuit	12 July	(Netherlands) Carlo van Dam	(Netherlands) Carlo van Dam	(Netherlands) Carlo van Dam	(Japan) Team TOM'S	(Japan) Hideki Yamauchi
6	R2	Suzuka Circuit	13 July	(Netherlands) Carlo van Dam	(Netherlands) Carlo van Dam	(Netherlands) Carlo van Dam	(Japan) Team TOM'S	(Japan) Masaki Matsushita
7	R1	Twin Ring Motegi	9 August	(Japan) Keisuke Kunimoto	(Netherlands) Carlo van Dam	(Netherlands) Carlo van Dam	(Japan) Team TOM'S	(Switzerland) Alexandre Imperatori
7	R2	Twin Ring Motegi	10 August	(Japan) Keisuke Kunimoto	(Japan) Takuto Iguchi	(Japan) Keisuke Kunimoto	(Japan) Team TOM'S	(Switzerland) Alexandre Imperatori
8	R1	Fuji Speedway	30 August	(Netherlands) Carlo van Dam	(Japan) Hironobu Yasuda	(Netherlands) Carlo van Dam	(Japan) Team TOM'S	(Japan) Hideki Yamauchi
8	R2	Fuji Speedway	31 August	(Netherlands) Carlo van Dam	(Japan) Keisuke Kunimoto	(Japan) Keisuke Kunimoto	(Japan) Team TOM'S	(Japan) Hideki Yamauchi
9	R1	Sportsland SUGO	20 September	(Netherlands) Carlo van Dam	(Netherlands) Carlo van Dam	(Netherlands) Carlo van Dam	(Japan) Team TOM'S	(Japan) Hideki Yamauchi
9	R2	Sportsland SUGO	21 September	(Netherlands) Carlo van Dam	(Japan) Koki Saga	(Netherlands) Carlo van Dam	(Japan) Team TOM'S	(Japan) Hideto Yasuoka

== Standings ==
- Points are awarded as follows:

=== Championship Class ===
1	2	3	4	5	6	7	8	9	10	PP	FL
20	15	12	10	8	6	4	3	2	1	1	1

=== National Class ===
- Points are awarded as follows:

1	2	3	4	5	6
10	6	4	3	2	1

Pos	Driver	FUJ		AUT		SUZ		MOT		OKA		SUZ		MOT		FUJ		SUG		Pts
Championship Class
1	(Netherlands) Carlo van Dam	2	2	3	3	3	1	1	2	2	1	1	1	1	2	1	2	1	1	322
2	(Japan) Keisuke Kunimoto	4	3	10	1	2	Ret	2	Ret	9	2	2	2	2	1	4	1	3	2	219
3	(Japan) Takuto Iguchi	1	1	1	2	8	11	4	Ret	8	3	4	3	3	3	2	3	2	3	216
4	(Japan) Hironobu Yasuda	DNS	4	6	6	1	2	3	1	4	8	6	5	Ret	8	8	5	4	5	152
5	(Japan) Naoki Yamamoto	5	7	5	5	Ret	4	5	Ret	1	4	3	4	5	5	6	6	5	7	138
6	(Italy) Kei Cozzolino	3	5	2	4	6	3	8	4	7	7	5	Ret	6	6	3	4	6	Ret	133
7	(Japan) Koki Saga	6	6	4	7	4	5	9	3	5	6	8	Ret	7	9	11	9	9	4	99
8	(Japan) Yuhki Nakayama	7	8	7	10	7	7	6	10	3	5	Ret	Ret	4	4	5	8	7	6	97
9	(Japan) Daisuke Nakajima	8	9	Ret	11	5	6	7	Ret	6	9	7	Ret	8	7	Ret	7	8	8	54
National Class
1	(Japan) Hideki Yamauchi	9	15	9	14	9	8	10	6	12	13	9	7	10	11	7	10	10	14	121
2	(Switzerland) Alexandre Imperatori	11	11	8	9	14	Ret	11	5	Ret	10	13	8	9	10	10	11	13	11	96
3	(Japan) Masaki Matsushita	13	10	11	15	12	9	14	9	11	12	10	6	11	13	9	12	11	10	85
4	(Indonesia) Zahir Ali	10	12	12	12	Ret	Ret	12	8	10	14	12	9	13	12	12	13	12	12	61
5	(Japan) Hideto Yasuoka	Ret	Ret	Ret	8	11	10	13	7	13	15	11	10	12	14	14	14	14	9	55
6	(Japan) Takashi Nagase	12	13	13	Ret	10	Ret	DNS	DNS	Ret	11									20
7	(Japan) Motoki Sakurai	14	14	14	13	13	12	15	11	14	16	15	Ret	14	16	15	16	16	13	19
8	(Japan) Katsuaki Kubota											14	Ret	15	15	13	15	15	Ret	6
Pos	Driver	FUJ		AUT		SUZ		MOT		OKA		SUZ		MOT		FUJ		SUG		Pts

=== Teams ===
- Points are awarded as follows:

1	2	3	4	5	6	7	8	9	10
20	15	12	10	8	6	4	3	2	1

Pos	Team	FUJ		AUT		SUZ		MOT		OKA		SUZ		MOT		FUJ		SUG		Pts
1	(Japan) Team TOM'S	1	1	1	1	2	1	1	2	2	1	1	1	1	1	1	1	1	1	345
2	(Japan) Team Real	5	7	5	5	7	4	5	10	1	4	3	4	4	4	5	6	5	6	158
3	(Japan) ThreeBond Racing	DNS	4	6	6	1	2	3	1	4	8	6	5	Ret	8	8	5	4	5	149
4	(Japan) Now Motor Sport	3	5	2	4	6	3	8	4	7	7	5	Ret	6	6	3	4	6	Ret	132
5	(Japan) Denso Team Le Beausset	6	6	4	7	4	5	9	3	5	6	8	Ret	7	9	11	9	9	4	98
6	(Japan) Toda Racing	8	9	Ret	11	5	6	7	Ret	6	9	7	Ret	8	7	Ret	7	8	8	54
Pos	Driver	FUJ		AUT		SUZ		MOT		OKA		SUZ		MOT		FUJ		SUG		Pts

=== Engine Tuners ===
- Points are awarded as follows:

1	2	3	4	5	6	7	8	9	10
20	15	12	10	8	6	4	3	2	1

Pos	Team	FUJ		AUT		SUZ		MOT		OKA		SUZ		MOT		FUJ		SUG		Pts
1	Toyota/TOM'S	1	1	1	1	2	1	1	2	2	1	1	1	1	1	1	1	1	1	345
2	Mugen-Honda	5	7	5	5	5	4	5	10	1	4	3	4	4	4	5	6	5	6	162
3	Nismo Nissan	DNS	4	6	6	1	2	3	1	4	8	6	5	Ret	8	8	5	4	5	149
4	Toyota	6	6	4	7	4	5	9	3	5	6	8	Ret	7	9	11	9	9	4	98
Pos	Driver	FUJ		AUT		SUZ		MOT		OKA		SUZ		MOT		FUJ		SUG		Pts
