= Japanese Formula 3 Championship =

Auto racing championship in Japan

- Category: Single seaters
- Country: Japan
- Inaugural season: 1979
- Folded: 2019
- Constructors: Dallara
- Engine suppliers: Toyota-TOM'S; Mugen-Honda; TODA Racing
- Tyre suppliers: Yokohama
- Last Drivers' champion: (France) Sacha Fenestraz
- Last Teams' champion: (Japan) B-Max Racing with Motopark
- Official website: www.j-formula3.com

Japanese Formula 3 Championship (全日本F3選手権, Zen'nihon F3 Senshuken) was a national motor racing championship that takes place in Japan. It is a junior-level feeder formula that uses small single seater Formula Three chassis.

As a result of Formula 3 naming regulations by the FIA, on 13 August 2019, series promoter Japan Race Promotion (jp), split from the FIA Formula Regional regulations and rebranded their series as Super Formula Lights to comply with FIA regulations, and remain as the Super Formula feeder championship since the series is prohibited from using "Formula 3" (which belongs to the FIA for the European-based FIA Formula 3 Championship) and "Formula Regional" (which all regional Formula 3 series are being renamed by the 2020 season, first with the Formula Regional European Championship in 2019 for Europe, and the renaming of the North American F3 championship from Formula 3 Americas to Formula Regional Americas Championship). The Series will adopt Euroformula Open Championship regulations.

Subsequently, the FIA awarded rights to a Formula Regional championship in Japan to K2, promoters of the F4 Japanese Championship, which will name their series the Formula Regional Japanese Championship.

With the rebranding of the series to Super Formula Lights, the Japanese Formula 3 championship officially ended after 41 years. The Japan Formula 3 Association will continue to run the new championship as stated on 28 February 2020.

== History ==
The first Formula Three championship to take place in Japan was held by Nippon Formula 3 Association (Japanese Formula 3 Association) in 1979, which was won by Toshio Suzuki. By 1981, it had evolved into a national-level series, the Japanese Championship, and was organised by the Japan Automobile Federation (JAF).

Foreign drivers' participation has increased since the 1980s and the majority of champions have been foreign since the beginning of the 1990s.

Since 2008 a two-tier championship system was adopted as a bid to increase driver and team participation. The "Championship" class was open to cars conforming to the current three-year cycle, whilst the lower tier "National" class was open to cars meeting the previous three-year cycle and using the spec Toyota engine.

Prior to the changing of super license requirements for the 2016 Formula One season onward, the series used to be one of the four major Formula Three championships that guaranteed the winner an FIA Super Licence. Under the new requirements the winner of the championship earns 10 points towards their super license, with drivers finishing from 2nd to 5th in the final standings receiving a smaller number of points.

== Equipment ==
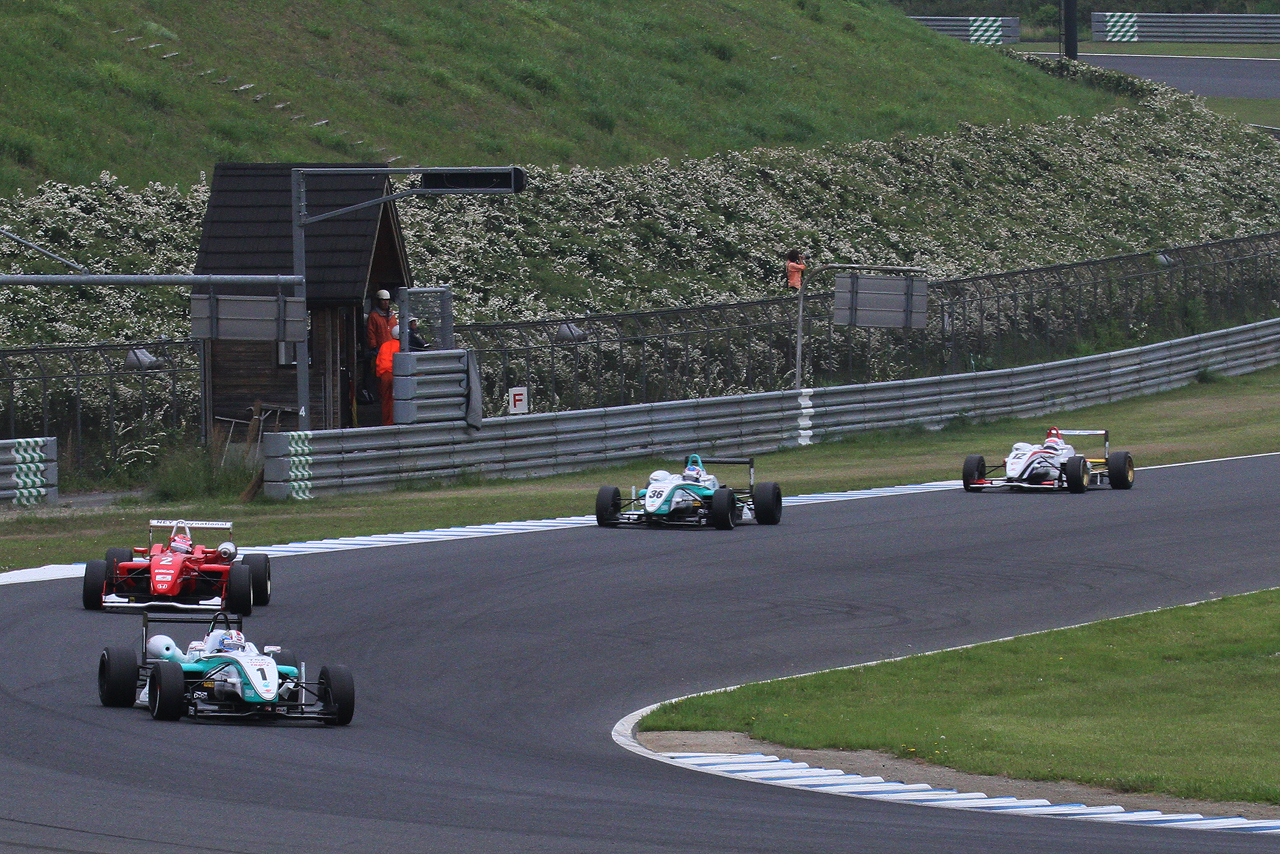
As of 2007, all competitors in the championship used Dallara chassis.

Like most Formula Three championships, competitors in the Japanese Championship are permitted to use only eligible chassis.

- Chassis:
  Only Dallara chassis have been used since 2007. In the past, March, Reynard, Ralt, and Japanese manufacturers like TOM'S and Dome also had supplied chassis.
- Engines:
  Engines are supplied by Toyota-TOM'S, Mugen-Honda, Toda Racing and ThreeBond (Nissan). Volkswagen, HKS (Mitsubishi), Fiat and Opel had previously supplied engines.
- Tyres:
  Hankook supplied tyres in 2009 as the series' sole supplier. Bridgestone, Dunlop and Yokohama had supplied tyres until 1987. In 1988, Bridgestone took place of the series' sole tyre supplier and supplied until 2008.

== Champions ==
| Season | Champion | Team Champion | National Class Champion |
|---|---|---|---|
| 1979 | (Japan) Toshio Suzuki | (Japan) Heros Racing | not held |
| 1980 | (Japan) Shuroko Sasaki | (Japan) Gallop Racing | not held |
| 1981 | (Japan) Osamu Nakako | (Japan) Hayashi Racing | not held |
| 1982 | (Japan) Kengo Nakamoto | (Japan) Hayashi Racing | not held |
| 1983 | (Japan) Yoshimasa Fujiwara | (Japan) Umeda Racing | not held |
| 1984 | (Japan) Shuji Hyoudo | (Japan) Hayashi Racing | not held |
| 1985 | (Japan) Koji Sato | (Japan) Le Garage Cox Racing | not held |
| 1986 | (Japan) Akio Morimoto | (Japan) LeMans Company | not held |
| 1987 | (United States) Ross Cheever | (Japan) TOM'S | not held |
| 1988 | (Japan) Akihiko Nakaya | (Japan) Le Garage Cox Racing | not held |
| 1989 | (Japan) Masahiko Kageyama | (Japan) Leyton House Racing | not held |
| 1990 | (Japan) Naoki Hattori | (Japan) Le Garage Cox Racing | not held |
| 1991 | (Brazil) Paulo Carcasci | (Japan) TOM'S | not held |
| 1992 | (United Kingdom) Anthony Reid | (Japan) Tomei Sport | not held |
| 1993 | (Denmark) Tom Kristensen | (Japan) TOM'S | not held |
| 1994 | (Germany) Michael Krumm | (Japan) TOM'S | not held |
| 1995 | (Spain) Pedro de la Rosa | (Japan) TOM'S | not held |
| 1996 | (Japan) Juichi Wakisaka | (Japan) Nakajima Racing | not held |
| 1997 | (Netherlands) Tom Coronel | (Japan) TOM'S | not held |
| 1998 | (United Kingdom) Peter Dumbreck | (Japan) TOM'S | not held |
| 1999 | (United Kingdom) Darren Manning | (Japan) TOM'S | not held |
| 2000 | (France) Sébastien Philippe | (Japan) Mugen Dome Project | not held |
| 2001 | (France) Benoît Tréluyer | (Japan) TOM'S | not held |
| 2002 | (Japan) Takashi Kogure | (Japan) Dome Racing Team | not held |
| 2003 | (Australia) James Courtney | (Japan) TOM'S | not held |
| 2004 | (Italy) Ronnie Quintarelli | (Japan) Inging | not held |
| 2005 | (Brazil) João Paulo de Oliveira | (Japan) TOM'S | not held |
| 2006 | (Germany) Adrian Sutil | (Japan) TOM'S | not held |
| 2007 | (Japan) Kazuya Oshima | (Japan) TOM'S | not held |
| 2008 | (Netherlands) Carlo van Dam | (Japan) TOM'S | (Japan) Hideki Yamauchi |
| 2009 | (Sweden) Marcus Ericsson | (Japan) TOM'S | (Japan) Naoki Yamamoto |
| 2010 | (Japan) Yuji Kunimoto | (Japan) TOM'S | (Japan) Takashi Kobayashi |
| 2011 | (Japan) Yuhi Sekiguchi | (Japan) ThreeBond Racing | (Japan) Katsumasa Chiyo |
| 2012 | (Japan) Ryo Hirakawa | (Japan) RSS | (Japan) Daiki Sasaki |
| 2013 | (Japan) Yuichi Nakayama | (Japan) TOM'S | (Japan) Mitsunori Takaboshi |
| 2014 | (Japan) Nobuharu Matsushita | (Japan) TOM'S | (Japan) Hiroshi Koizumi |
| 2015 | (New Zealand) Nick Cassidy | (Japan) TOM'S | (Japan) Ryo Ogawa |
| 2016 | (Japan) Kenta Yamashita | (Japan) TOM'S | (Japan) Yoshiaki Katayama |
| 2017 | (Japan) Mitsunori Takaboshi | (Japan) B-MAX Racing Team | (Japan) 'Dragon' |
| 2018 | (Japan) Sho Tsuboi | (Japan) TOM'S | (Australia) Jake Parsons |
| 2019 | (France) Sacha Fenestraz | (Japan) B-Max Racing Team with Motopark | (Japan) 'Dragon' |
