= Keisuke Kunimoto =

Japanese racing driver of Korean descent (born 1989)

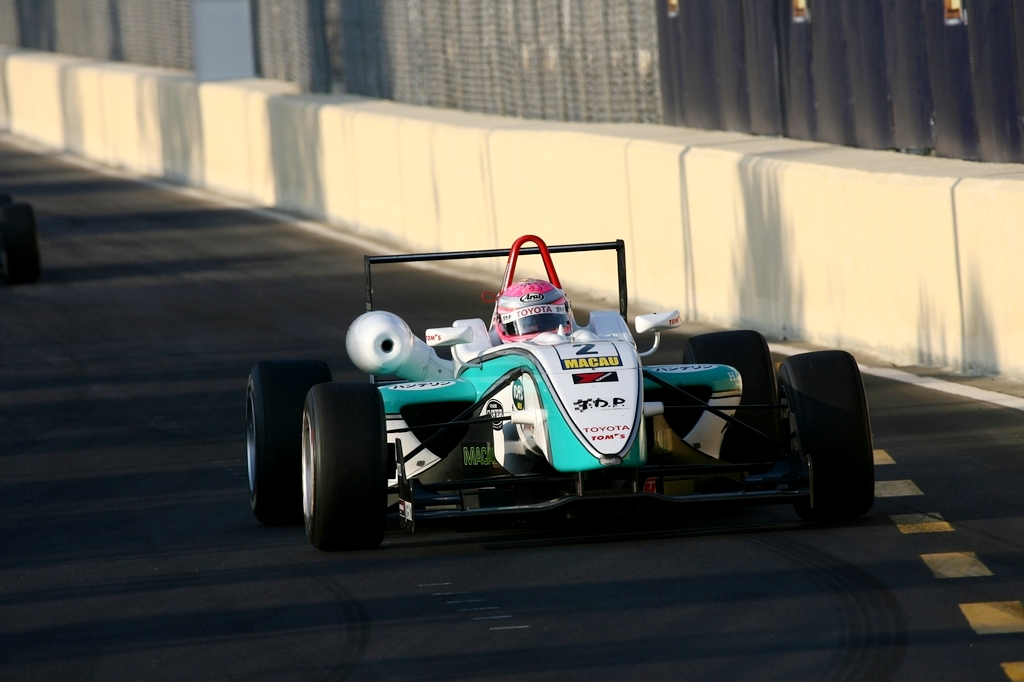
- Kunimoto in 2008
- Nationality: (Japan) Japanese
- Born: 9 January 1989 (age 37) Yokohama, Japan
- Relatives: Yuji Kunimoto (brother)

Keisuke Kunimoto (国本 京佑, Kunimoto Keisuke; born 9 January 1989), also known as Lee Kyung-woo (Korean: 이경우), is a Japanese racing driver of Zainichi Korean descent. A former Toyota junior, Kunimoto won the 2008 Macau Grand Prix for TOM'S. He later competed in Formula Nippon, Formula Renault 3.5 Series and the 24 Hours of Le Mans.

He is the older brother of 2016 Super Formula champion Yuji Kunimoto.

== Personal life ==
Kunimoto's mother is Japanese. His father, Yoshihiro Lee (李好廣、이호광 Lee Ho-gwang), also known as Yoshihiro Kunimoto, is the 1983 All Japan Karting Champion and his uncle, Yoshihiko Lee (이호언 Lee Ho-eon), won the same karting championship twice in 1980 and 1981. His younger brother, Yuji, is also a race car driver in Super Formula and Super GT.

== Racing career ==
Kunimoto began karting in 2001 when he was 12. After winning the All Japan Karting Championship FA Class in 2004, he entered Formula Toyota Racing School and took scholarship of Toyota. He began his car racing career in the 2005 Formula Toyota season, at the seventh round of the season in Tsukuba.

Kunimoto competed in Formula Toyota and Formula Challenge Japan in 2006 and 2007, and won the championship of Formula Challenge Japan with three wins and ended runner-up in Formula Toyota in 2007.

In 2008, Kunimoto raced in the All-Japan Formula Three for TOM'S and in the Super GT for apr, as a Toyota Young Drivers Program (TDP) driver. He finished runner-up in the first Formula Three season.

=== 2008 Macau Grand Prix ===
At the end of the season, Kunimoto went to Macau with TOM'S and won the Macau F3 Grand Prix, becoming the second Japanese driver to win the race after Takuma Sato.

=== Formula Nippon ===
Kunimoto competed in the 2009 Formula Nippon season for Team LeMans, finishing last in the standings with one point.

=== A1 Grand Prix ===
Kunimoto joined A1 Team Korea for the 2008–09 A1 Grand Prix season, and was set to make his debut at the Kyalami round, but issues regarding a political slogan on his car, which stated "Dokdo is a Korean territory", prevented him from racing that weekend. Kunimoto was dropped by Toyota at the end of 2009.

=== Formula Renault 3.5 Series ===
Kunimoto joined Epsilon Euskadi for the last two Formula Renault 3.5 Series rounds of the 2009 season. He replaced Spaniard Dani Clos in the team's line-up at the Nürburgring and at the season finale at the new Ciudad del Motor de Aragón circuit.

Kunimoto returned with the team for the 2010 season, partnering 2009 Eurocup Formula Renault 2.0 champion Albert Costa.

== Racing record ==
=== Career summary ===
Season	Series	Team	Races	Wins	Poles	FLaps	Podiums	Points	Position
2005	Formula Toyota	TDP Scholarship	1	0	0	0	0	0	14th
2006	Formula Toyota	TDP Scholarship FT	10	0	0	0	1	56	7th
2006	Formula Challenge Japan	TDP Scholarship	10	0	0	0	1	47	7th
2007	Formula Challenge Japan	TDP Scholarship	18	3	3	5	9	189	**1st**
2007	Formula Toyota	A Project Hanashima	7	2	0	0	6	98	**2nd**
2008	Japanese Formula 3 Championship	TOM'S	18	3	2	3	12	219	**2nd**
2008	Macau Grand Prix	TOM'S	1	1	0	0	1	N/A	**1st**
2008	Super GT - GT300	apr	9	1	1	0	2	50	9th
2008–09	A1 Grand Prix	A1 Team Korea	0	0	0	0	0	4‡	19th‡
2009	Formula Nippon	Team LeMans	8	0	0	1	0	1	13th
2009	24 Hours of Le Mans - LMP2	Navi Team Goh	1	0	0	0	0	N/A	DNF
2009	Formula Renault 3.5 Series	Epsilon Euskadi	4	0	0	0	0	0	32nd
2010	Formula Renault 3.5 Series	Epsilon Euskadi	18	0	0	0	0	8	22nd

‡ Team standings

=== Complete Japanese Formula 3 results ===
(key) (Races in bold indicate pole position) (Races in italics indicate fastest lap)

Year	Team	Engine	1	2	3	4	5	6	7	8	9	10	11	12	13	14	15	16	17	18	DC	Pts
2008	Petronas Team TOM'S	Toyota	FUJ; 1; 4	FUJ; 2; 3	AUT; 1; 10	AUT; 2; 1	SUZ; 1; 2	SUZ; 2 Ret	MOT; 1; 2	MOT; 2 Ret	OKA; 1; 9	OKA; 2; 2	SUZ; 1; 2	SUZ; 2; 2	**MOT**; **1**; 2	**MOT**; **2**; 1	FUJ; 1; 4	FUJ; 2; 1	SUG; 1; 3	SUG; 2; 2	2nd	219

=== Complete Super GT results ===
Year	Team	Car	Class	1	2	3	4	5	6	7	8	9	DC	Pts
2008	apr	Toyota MR-S	GT300	SUZ; 13	OKA; 12	FUJ; 1	SEP; 9	SUG; 6	SUZ; 2	MOT; 16	AUT; 9	FUJ; Ret	9th	50

=== Complete Formula Nippon results ===
(key) (Races in bold indicate pole position) (Races in italics indicate fastest lap)

Year	Team	Engine	1	2	3	4	5	6	7	8	DC	Points
2009	Team LeMans	Toyota	FUJ; 9	SUZ; 9	MOT; Ret	FUJ; 10	SUZ; 11	MOT; Ret	AUT; 11	SUG; 8	13th	1

=== 24 Hours of Le Mans results ===
Year	Team	Co-Drivers	Car	Class	Laps	Pos.	Class Pos.
2009	(Japan) Navi Team Goh	(Japan) Seiji Ara (Germany) Sascha Maassen	Porsche RS Spyder Evo	LMP2	339	DNF	DNF

=== Complete Formula Renault 3.5 Series results ===
(key) (Races in bold indicate pole position) (Races in italics indicate fastest lap)

Year	Team	1	2	3	4	5	6	7	8	9	10	11	12	13	14	15	16	17	Pos	Points
2009	Epsilon Euskadi	CAT; 1	CAT; 2	SPA; 1	SPA; 2	MON; 1	HUN; 1	HUN; 2	SIL; 1	SIL; 2	BUG; 1	BUG; 2	ALG; 1	ALG; 2	NÜR; 1; 16	NÜR; 2; 13	ALC; 1; 17	ALC; 2; 21	32nd	0
2010	Epsilon Euskadi	ALC; 1 Ret	ALC; 2; 14	SPA; 1; 15	SPA; 2; 16	MON; 1; 18	BRN; 1; 5	BRN; 2 Ret	MAG; 1; 16	MAG; 2; 18	HUN; 1; 9	HUN; 2; 15	HOC; 1; 12	HOC; 2; 13	SIL; 1; 12	SIL; 2; 13	CAT; 1; 11	CAT; 2; 18	22nd	8

Sporting positions
Preceded by Yuhi Sekiguchi	Formula Challenge Japan; Champion; 2007	Succeeded by Yuji Kunimoto
Preceded by Oliver Jarvis	Macau Grand Prix; Winner; 2008	Succeeded by Edoardo Mortara
