= Hideki Yamauchi =

Japanese racing driver (born 1988)

- Nationality: Japanese
- Born: 24 October 1988 (age 38) Nishiwaki, Hyōgo, Japan

Super GT career
- Debut season: 2008
- Current team: R&D Sport
- Categorisation: FIA Gold
- Car number: 61
- Starts: 126
- Wins: 4
- Poles: 14
- Fastest laps: 7
- Best finish: 1st in 2021

Previous series
- 2008, 2010–12 2007 2005–06: All-Japan Formula Three Championship; Formula Challenge Japan; Formula Toyota

Championship titles
- 2008: All-Japan Formula Three Championship - National

Hideki Yamauchi (山内英輝, Yamauchi Hideki; born 24 October 1988) is a Japanese professional racing driver who currently competes in Super GT for R&D Sport. Alongside teammate Takuto Iguchi, he was champion of the 2021 Super GT Series in the GT300 class.

== Complete Super GT Results ==
(key) (Races in bold indicate pole position) (Races in italics indicate fastest lap)

Year	Team	Car	Class	1	2	3	4	5	6	7	8	9	DC	Points
2014	Gainer	Mercedes-Benz SLS AMG GT3	GT300	OKA; 10	FUJ; 20	AUT; 12	SUG; 13	FUJ; 14	SUZ; 4	CHA; 11	MOT; 5		17th	18
2015	R&D SPORT	Subaru BRZ GT300 (ZC6)	GT300	OKA; 17	FUJ; 8	CHA; 6	FUJ; 8	SUZ; 3	SUG; 5	AUT; Ret	MOT; 11		13th	30
2016	R&D SPORT	Subaru BRZ GT300 (ZC6)	GT300	OKA; 23	FUJ; 11	SUG; 3	FUJ; 3	SUZ; 1	CHA; Ret	MOT; 23	MOT; 13		6th	47
2017	R&D SPORT	Subaru BRZ GT300 (ZC6)	GT300	OKA; Ret	FUJ; 13	AUT; 2	SUG; 9	FUJ; 4	SUZ; 7	CHA; Ret	MOT; Ret		9th	30
2018	R&D SPORT	Subaru BRZ GT300 (ZC6)	GT300	OKA; 18	FUJ; Ret	SUZ; 3	CHA; Ret	FUJ; Ret	**SUG**; 1	AUT; 15	MOT; 6		8th	37
2019	R&D SPORT	Subaru BRZ GT300 (ZC6)	GT300	OKA; 4	FUJ; 28	SUZ; 3	CHA; 11	FUJ; 10	AUT; Ret	**SUG**; 28	MOT; 12		18th	17
2020	R&D SPORT	Subaru BRZ GT300 (ZC6)	GT300	FUJ; Ret	FUJ; 2	SUZ; 4	MOT; 3	FUJ; 16	SUZ; 12	**MOT**; 5	FUJ; 8		5th	44
2021	R&D SPORT	Subaru BRZ GT300 (ZD8)	GT300	OKA; 15	**FUJ**; 2	MOT; 11	**SUZ**; 10	**SUG**; 1	AUT; 3	MOT; 6	**FUJ**; 3		1st	67
2022	R&D SPORT	Subaru BRZ GT300 (ZD8)	GT300	**OKA**; 9	**FUJ**; 3	SUZ; 12	FUJ; 1	SUZ; 18	**SUG**; 8	**AUT**; 2	MOT; 20		2nd	49.5
2023	R&D SPORT	Subaru BRZ GT300 (ZD8)	GT300	OKA; 22	FUJ; 11	**SUZ**; 6	FUJ; 6	**SUZ**; 3	SUG; 4	AUT; 4	MOT; 10		8th	40
2024	R&D SPORT	Subaru BRZ GT300 (ZD8)	GT300	OKA; 26^{3}†	FUJ; 15	SUZ; Ret^{2}	FUJ; 24	SUG; 5^{2}	AUT; 25†	MOT; Ret	SUZ; 7^{2}		16th	15
2025	R&D SPORT	Subaru BRZ GT300 (ZD8)	GT300	OKA; 13	FUJ; 8	SEP; 8	FS1; 9	FS2 (Ret)	**SUZ**; 2	SUG; 22†	AUT; 24†	**MOT**; 2	9th	65
2026	R&D SPORT	Subaru BRZ GT300 (ZD8)	GT300	OKA; 17	**FUJ**; 27†	FUJ; 28	SUZ; 28†	SUG; 3	**AUT**; 13	MOT; 22†	MOT; 13		27th	24

^{†} Driver did not finish the race, but were classified as they completed over 75% of the race distance. ^{(Number)} Driver did not take part in this sprint race, points are still awarded for the teammate's result.
^{*} Season still in progress.
