= Gaëtan Jego =

French Formula One engineer

- Education: ESTACA
- Occupation: Engineer
- Employer: Williams Racing
- Known for: Formula One engineer
- Title: Race engineer

Gaëtan Jego is a French Formula One and motorsports engineer. He is currently the race engineer for Carlos Sainz at the Williams Racing Formula One team.

== Career ==
Jego studied engineering at ESTACA. He began his motorsport career in junior single-seaters, working as a race engineer in Formula Renault and the Formula 3 Euro Series. In 2005 he joined ART Grand Prix as a data engineer for the team's GP2 Series programme, and the following year became race engineer to Alexandre Prémat. He subsequently rose to the position of chief race engineer, overseeing trackside engineering operations across ART's GP2 activities. From 2013 to 2014 he served as chief engineer in GT racing, before moving into the same role in the DTM. In 2016 he was appointed technical director of ART's DTM programme, later continuing as technical director when the team expanded into LMP1 competition.

Jego joined Williams Racing in 2020, becoming race engineer to rookie Nicholas Latifi. He remained with the Canadian for three seasons. In 2023 he was paired with another rookie, Logan Sargeant, guiding the American through his debut Formula One campaign and into the early part of the 2024 season. Following a mid-season driver change, Jego engineered Franco Colapinto for the remainder of 2024. For the 2025 season Jego was assigned as Race Engineer to Carlos Sainz, taking responsibility for integrating the Spaniard into the Williams environment and leading race execution and trackside operations. The partnership delivered two podium finishes during the 2025 season.
