= 2004 Masters of Formula 3 =

Race details
Date	8 August 2004
Official name	Marlboro Masters of Formula 3
Location	Circuit Park Zandvoort, Netherlands
Course	4.307 km (2.676 mi)
Distance	25 laps, 107.675 km (66.906 mi)

Pole
Driver	(France) Alexandre Prémat	ASM Formule 3
Time	1.32.767

Fastest Lap
Driver	(France) Eric Salignon	ASM Formule 3
Time	1.34.220 (on lap 7 of 25)

Podium
First	(France) Alexandre Prémat	ASM Formule 3
Second	(France) Eric Salignon	ASM Formule 3
Third	(United Kingdom) Adam Carroll	P1 Motorsport

The 2004 Marlboro Masters of Formula 3 was the fourteenth Masters of Formula 3 race held at Circuit Park Zandvoort on 8 August 2004. It was won by Alexandre Prémat, for ASM Formule 3.

== Drivers and teams ==
2004 Entry List
Team	No	Driver	Chassis	Engine	Main series
(Germany) ASL-Mücke Motorsport	1	(Canada) Bruno Spengler	Dallara F302	Mercedes	Formula 3 Euro Series
(Germany) ASL-Mücke Motorsport	2	(Germany) Daniel la Rosa	Dallara F302	Mercedes	Formula 3 Euro Series
(France) ASM Formule 3	3	(United Kingdom) Jamie Green	Dallara F303	Mercedes	Formula 3 Euro Series
(France) ASM Formule 3	4	(France) Alexandre Prémat	Dallara F303	Mercedes	Formula 3 Euro Series
(France) ASM Formule 3	5	(France) Eric Salignon	Dallara F303	Mercedes	Formula 3 Euro Series
(United Kingdom) Manor Motorsport	7	(United Kingdom) Lewis Hamilton	Dallara F302	Mercedes	Formula 3 Euro Series
(United Kingdom) Manor Motorsport	8	(Netherlands) Charles Zwolsman Jr.	Dallara F302	Mercedes	Formula 3 Euro Series
(France) Opel Team Signature-Plus	9	(Netherlands) Giedo van der Garde	Dallara F302	Opel	Formula 3 Euro Series
(France) Opel Team Signature-Plus	10	(France) Nicolas Lapierre	Dallara F304	Opel	Formula 3 Euro Series
(France) Opel Team Signature	11	(France) Loïc Duval	Dallara F302	Opel	Formula 3 Euro Series
(France) Opel Team Signature	12	(Belgium) Greg Franchi	Dallara F302	Opel	Formula 3 Euro Series
(United Kingdom) P1 Motorsport	14	(United Kingdom) Adam Carroll	Dallara F304	Mugen-Honda	British Formula 3
(United Kingdom) P1 Motorsport	15	(Malaysia) Fairuz Fauzy	Dallara F303	Mugen-Honda	British Formula 3
(Brazil) Piquet Sports	17	(Brazil) Nelson Piquet Jr.	Dallara F303	Mugen-Honda	British Formula 3
(Germany) Team Rosberg	18	(Germany) Nico Rosberg	Dallara F303	Opel	Formula 3 Euro Series
(Germany) Team Rosberg	19	(Austria) Andreas Zuber	Dallara F303	Opel	Formula 3 Euro Series
(United Kingdom) Carlin Motorsport	20	(Monaco) Clivio Piccione	Dallara F302	Mugen-Honda	British Formula 3
(United Kingdom) Carlin Motorsport	21	(Brazil) Danilo Dirani	Dallara F302	Mugen-Honda	British Formula 3
(United Kingdom) Carlin Motorsport	22	(Portugal) Álvaro Parente	Dallara F302	Mugen-Honda	British Formula 3
(Germany) Kolles	23	(United Kingdom) Tom Kimber-Smith	Dallara F302	Mercedes	Formula 3 Euro Series
(Germany) Kolles	24	(Germany) Adrian Sutil	Dallara F303	Mercedes	Formula 3 Euro Series
(Italy) Prema Powerteam	25	(Brazil) Roberto Streit	Dallara F304	Opel	Formula 3 Euro Series
(Italy) Prema Powerteam	26	(France) Franck Perera	Dallara F304	Opel	Formula 3 Euro Series
(Italy) Prema Powerteam	27	(Japan) Katsuyuki Hiranaka	Dallara F303	Opel	Formula 3 Euro Series
(Germany) Vitaphone Racing Team; AB Racing Performance	28	(Greece) Alexandros Margaritis	Dallara F303	Opel	Formula 3 Euro Series
(United Kingdom) Promatecme	29	(United Kingdom) Danny Watts	Lola-Dome F106/04	Mugen-Honda	British Formula 3
(Italy) Ombra	30	(Italy) Paolo Montin	Dallara F304	Mugen-Honda	
(Italy) Ombra	31	(Italy) Matteo Cressoni	Dallara F304	Mugen-Honda	Italian Formula Three
(United Kingdom) Fortec Motorsport	32	(United Kingdom) James Rossiter	Dallara F302	Opel	British Formula 3
(United Kingdom) Fortec Motorsport	33	(Australia) Marcus Marshall	Dallara F302	Opel	British Formula 3
(United Kingdom) Alan Docking Racing	34	(Netherlands) Ferdinand Kool	Dallara F302	Mugen-Honda	British Formula 3
(United Kingdom) Hitech Racing	36	(Estonia) Marko Asmer	Dallara F302	Renault	British Formula 3
(United Kingdom) Hitech Racing	37	(Brazil) Lucas di Grassi	Dallara F302	Renault	British Formula 3
(United Kingdom) Hitech Racing	38	(United Kingdom) James Walker	Dallara F302	Renault	British Formula 3
(United Kingdom) Hitech Racing	39	(United Kingdom) Andrew Thompson	Dallara F302	Renault	British Formula 3
(Austria) HBR Motorsport	40	(Austria) Hannes Neuhauser	Dallara F303	Opel	Formula 3 Euro Series
(Austria) HBR Motorsport	41	(Netherlands) Ross Zwolsman	Dallara F304	Opel	Formula 3 Euro Series
(Italy) Team Ghinzani	42	(Belgium) Philip Cloostermans	Dallara F302	Mugen-Honda	
(Italy) Team Ghinzani	43	(Italy) Marco Bonanomi	Dallara F302	Mugen-Honda	Formula 3 Euro Series
(Switzerland) Swiss Racing Team	44	(Spain) Alejandro Núñez	Dallara F302	Opel	Formula 3 Euro Series
(Switzerland) Swiss Racing Team	45	(Germany) Peter Elkmann	Dallara F302	Opel	Formula 3 Euro Series
(Luxembourg) TME Racing	46	(Germany) Maximilian Götz	Dallara F303	Toyota	Formula 3 Euro Series

== Classification ==
=== Race ===
Pos	No	Driver	Team	Laps	Time/Retired	Grid
1	4	(France) Alexandre Prémat	ASM Formule 3	25	0:43.20.751	1
2	5	(France) Eric Salignon	ASM Formule 3	25	+1.530	2
3	14	(United Kingdom) Adam Carroll	P1 Motorsport	25	+4.105	5
4	32	(United Kingdom) James Rossiter	Fortec Motorsport	25	+9.334	3
5	37	(Brazil) Lucas di Grassi	Hitech Racing	25	+13.270	4
6	18	(Germany) Nico Rosberg	Team Rosberg	25	+14.257	7
7	7	(United Kingdom) Lewis Hamilton	Manor Motorsport	25	+15.103	14
8	17	(Brazil) Nelson Piquet Jr.	Piquet Sports	25	+18.903	6
9	3	(United Kingdom) Jamie Green	ASM Formule 3	25	+21.295	10
10	29	(United Kingdom) Danny Watts	Promatecme	25	+21.507	12
11	26	(France) Franck Perera	Prema Powerteam	25	+24.346	11
12	2	(Germany) Daniel la Rosa	ASL-Mücke Motorsport	25	+31.156	21
13	9	(Netherlands) Giedo van der Garde	Opel Team Signature-Plus	25	+32.139	16
14	11	(France) Loïc Duval	Opel Team Signature	25	+34.703	18
15	25	(Brazil) Roberto Streit	Prema Powerteam	25	+38.377	20
16	36	(Estonia) Marko Asmer	Hitech Racing	25	+38.535	17
17	21	(Brazil) Danilo Dirani	Carlin Motorsport	25	+39.010	24
18	8	(Netherlands) Charles Zwolsman Jr.	Manor Motorsport	25	+41.797	13
19	20	(Monaco) Clivio Piccione	Carlin Motorsport	25	+42.633	19
20	24	(Germany) Adrian Sutil	Kolles	25	+43.311	23
21	28	(Greece) Alexandros Margaritis	Vitaphone Racing; Team AB Racing Performance	25	+48.783	25
22	27	(Japan) Katsuyuki Hiranaka	Prema Powerteam	25	+49.227	34
23	40	(Austria) Hannes Neuhauser	HBR Motorsport	25	+53.040	33
24	33	(Australia) Marcus Marshall	Fortec Motorsport	25	+53.333	28
25	19	(Austria) Andreas Zuber	Team Rosberg	25	+54.147	22
26	41	(Netherlands) Ross Zwolsman	HBR Motorsport	25	+57.758	36
27	20	(United Kingdom) Tom Kimber-Smith	Kolles	25	+1:02.016	32
28	38	(United Kingdom) James Walker	Hitech Racing	25	+1:05.880	37
29	12	(Belgium) Greg Franchi	Opel Team Signature	25	+1:08.389	35
30	1	(Canada) Bruno Spengler	ASL-Mücke Motorsport	25	+1:10.845	8
31	10	(France) Nicolas Lapierre	Opel Team Signature	24	+1 Lap	9
32	46	(Germany) Maximilian Götz	TME Racing	21	+4 Laps	31
33	39	(United Kingdom) Andrew Thompson	Hitech Racing	21	+4 Laps	30
Ret	22	(Portugal) Álvaro Parente	Carlin Motorsport	12	Retired	15
Ret	30	(Italy) Paolo Montin	Ombra	2	Retired	27
Ret	15	(Malaysia) Fairuz Fauzy	P1 Motorsport	0	Accident	26
Ret	34	(Netherlands) Ferdinand Kool	JB Motorsport	0	Accident	29
DNQ	31	(Italy) Matteo Cressoni	Ombra			
DNQ	45	(Germany) Peter Elkmann	Swiss Racing Team			
DNQ	43	(Italy) Marco Bonanomi	Team Ghinzani			
DNQ	44	(Spain) Alejandro Núñez	Swiss Racing Team			
DNQ	42	(Belgium) Philip Cloostermans	Team Ghinzani			
Fastest lap: Eric Salignon, 1.34.220, 164.564 km/h (102.255 mph) on lap 7

== See also ==
- 2004 Formula 3 Euro Series season
- 2004 British Formula 3 season
