= 2004 Formula 3 Euro Series =

Motor racing championship

The 2004 Formula 3 Euro Series season was the second championship year of Europe's premier Formula Three series. The championship consisted of ten rounds – each with two races – held at a variety of European circuits. Each weekend consisted of 1 hour and 30 minutes of free practice on Friday – in either one or two sessions – and two 30-minute qualifying sessions. This was followed by a c.110 km race on Saturday and a c.80 km race on Sunday. Each qualifying session awarded one bonus point for pole position and each race awarded points for the top eight finishers, with ten points per win.

== Teams and drivers ==
2004 Entry List
Team	No.	Driver	Status	Chassis (Note: All drivers competed in Dallara chassis (except Coloni Motorsport drivers, who used Lola-Dome chassis); model listed.)	Engine	Rounds
(Italy) Prema Powerteam	1	(Japan) Katsuyuki Hiranaka		F304/009	Opel	1–5
(Italy) Prema Powerteam	1	(Japan) Katsuyuki Hiranaka		F303/025	Opel	6–10
(Italy) Prema Powerteam	2	(France) Franck Perera		F304/010	Opel	All
(Italy) Prema Powerteam	26	(Brazil) Roberto Streit	R	F304/011	Opel	All
(Italy) Prema Powerteam	41	(Japan) Kohei Hirate	R	F304/009	Opel	8, 10
(Germany) ASL-Mücke Motorsport / ADAC Berlin-Brandenburg	3	(Canada) Bruno Spengler		F302/012	Mercedes	All
(Germany) ASL-Mücke Motorsport / ADAC Berlin-Brandenburg	4	(Poland) Robert Kubica		F302/032	Mercedes	All
(France) ASM Formule 3	5	(France) Alexandre Prémat		F303/015	Mercedes	All
(France) ASM Formule 3	6	(United Kingdom) Jamie Green		F303/016	Mercedes	All
(France) ASM Formule 3	27	(France) Éric Salignon		F303/014	Mercedes	1–8
(France) ASM Formule 3	27	(Germany) Adrian Sutil	R	F303/014	Mercedes	10
(Switzerland) Opel Team KMS	7	(Greece) Alexandros Margaritis		F303/021	Opel	1–6
(Switzerland) Opel Team KMS	7	(Brazil) Ruben Carrapatoso		F303/009	Opel	7–10
(Switzerland) Opel Team KMS	8	(Germany) Robert Kath	R	F303/009	Opel	1–6
(France) Opel Team Signature-Plus	9	(Netherlands) Giedo van der Garde	R	F302/018	Opel	All
(France) Opel Team Signature-Plus	10	(France) Nicolas Lapierre		F304/004	Opel	All
(Germany) Team Rosberg	11	(Germany) Nico Rosberg		F303/006	Opel	All
(Germany) Team Rosberg	12	(Austria) Andreas Zuber		F303/005; F303/206	Opel	All
(Italy) Team Ghinzani	14	(Austria) Philipp Baron		F302/042	Mugen	All
(Italy) Team Ghinzani	15	(United Kingdom) Derek Hayes		F302/003	Mugen	9
(Italy) Team Ghinzani	31	(Italy) Marco Bonanomi	R	F302/052	Mugen	All
(Germany) Maximilian Götz	18	(Germany) Maximilian Götz	R	F303/001	TOM's	1–9
(Netherlands) Ross Zwolsman	19	(Netherlands) Ross Zwolsman	R	F302/088	TOM's	1
(Switzerland) Swiss Racing Team	20	(Brazil) Fernando Rees		F302/061	Opel	1
(Switzerland) Swiss Racing Team	20	(Germany) Peter Elkmann		F302/061	Opel	5–10
(Switzerland) Swiss Racing Team	21	(Germany) Dennis Furchheim	R	F302/011	Opel	1–2
(Switzerland) Swiss Racing Team	21	(Spain) Alejandro Núñez		F302/011	Opel	6–10
(Austria) HBR Motorsport	22	(Germany) Daniel la Rosa		F304/012	Opel	All
(Austria) HBR Motorsport	23	(Austria) Hannes Neuhauser	R	F303/022	Opel	All
(Germany) Team Kolles	24	(Germany) Adrian Sutil	R	F303/012	Mercedes	1–9
(Germany) Team Kolles	24	(Germany) Maximilian Götz	R	F303/012	Mercedes	10
(Germany) Team Kolles	25	(United Kingdom) Tom Kimber-Smith	R	F302/076	Mercedes	All
(France) Opel Team Signature	29	(France) Loïc Duval	R	F302/043	Opel	All
(France) Opel Team Signature	30	(Belgium) Gregory Franchi	R	F302/067	Opel	1–8, 10
(United Kingdom) Manor Motorsport	34	(Netherlands) Charles Zwolsman Jr.	R	F302/090	Mercedes	All
(United Kingdom) Manor Motorsport	35	(United Kingdom) Lewis Hamilton	R	F302/049	Mercedes	All
(Italy) Coloni Motorsport	37	(San Marino) Christian Montanari	R	F106/03/008	Mugen	1–2
(Italy) Coloni Motorsport	38	(Finland) Toni Vilander	R	F106/03/009	Mugen	1–2
(Germany) AB Racing Performance	40	(Greece) Alexandros Margaritis		F303/021	Opel	7–10

Icon	Legend
R	Rookie

=== Driver changes ===
Changed Teams

- Jamie Green: Kolles → ASM Formule 3
- Robert Kubica: Prema Powerteam → Mücke Motorsport
- Alexandros Margaritis: MB Racing Performance → AB Racing Performance
- Daniel la Rosa: MB Racing Performance → HBR Motorsport
- Bruno Spengler: ASM F3 → Mücke Motorsport
- Charles Zwolsman Jr.: Kolles → Manor Motorsport

Entering Formula 3 Euro Series

- Marco Bonanomi: Italian Formula Three Championship (Coloni F3) → Team Ghinzani
- Ruben Carrapatoso: Formula Renault 2000 Italia (Alan Racing) → Opel Team KMS
- Loïc Duval: Championnat de France Formula Renault 2.0 (Graff Racing) → OPEL Team Signature
- Peter Elkmann: International Superkart Series – Division 1 → Swiss Racing Team
- Gregory Franchi: Italian Formula Three Championship (Lucidi Motors) → Opel Team Signature
- Dennis Furchheim: Formula Renault 2000 Germany (Franken Racing) & Spanish Formula Three Championship (Racing Engineering) → Swiss Racing Team
- Giedo van der Garde: Formula Renault 2000 Netherlands & Formula Renault 2000 Masters (van Amersfoort Racing) → Opel Team Signature-Plus
- Maximilian Götz: Formula BMW ADAC (ADAC Berlin-Brandenburg e.V) → TME
- Lewis Hamilton: Formula Renault 2.0 UK (Manor Motorsport) → Manor Motorsport
- Derek Hayes: NASCAR Busch Series (Moy Racing) → Team Ghinzani
- Kohei Hirate: Formula Renault 2000 Italia & Formula Renault 2000 Masters (Prema Powerteam) → Prema Powerteam
- Robert Kath: Formula BMW ADAC (ADAC Sachsen e.V.) → Opel Team KMS
- Tom Kimber-Smith: Formula Ford Great Britain (Panasonic Batteries Racing Team) → Team Kolles
- Christian Montanari: Italian Formula Three Championship (Coloni F3) → Coloni Motorsport
- Hannes Neuhauser: German Formula Three Championship (Achleitner Motorsport) → HBR Motorsport
- Alejandro Núñez: Spanish Formula Three Championship (E.V. Racing & Azteca Motorsport) → Swiss Racing Team
- Franck Perera: Formula Renault 2000 Italia & Formula Renault 2000 Masters (Prema Powerteam) → Prema Powerteam
- Fernando Rees: Formula Three Sudamericana (Cesario F3) → Swiss Racing Team
- Éric Salignon: British Formula 3 Championship (Hitech Racing) → ASM Formule 3
- Roberto Streit: Formula Renault 2000 Italia & Formula Renault 2000 Masters (Prema Powerteam) → Prema Powerteam
- Adrian Sutil: Formula BMW ADAC (HBR Motorsport) → Team Kolles
- Toni Vilander: Formula Renault 2000 Italia & Formula Renault 2000 Masters (RP Motorsport) → Coloni Motorsport
- Ross Zwolsman: Formula Renault 2000 Germany & Formula Renault 2000 Masters (Ma-Con) → TME

Leaving Formula 3 Euro Series

- Simon Abadie: LD Autosport → World Series Light (Epsilon by Graff)
- Nicolas Armindo: Saulnier Racing → Porsche Carrera Cup Germany (Land Motorsport-PZ Koblenz)
- Bernhard Auinger: Superfund TME → Superfund Euro Formula 3000 (Euronova Racing)
- Ryan Briscoe: Prema Powerteam → Formula One (Panasonic Toyota Racing test driver)
- César Campaniço: Signature Plus → Formula Renault V6 Eurocup (Cram Competition)
- Fabio Carbone: Signature Plus → All-Japan Formula Three Championship (Three Bond Racing)
- Adam Carroll: Opel Team KMS → British Formula 3 Championship (P1 Racing)
- Robert Doornbos: Team Ghinzani → International Formula 3000 (Arden International)
- Maro Engel: Opel Team KMS → German Formula Three Championship (SMS Seyffarth Motorsport)
- Timo Glock: Opel Team KMS → Formula One (Jordan Ford)
- Lucas di Grassi: Prema Powerteam → British Formula 3 Championship (Hitech Racing)
- Jan Heylen: Kolles → German Formula Three Championship (JB Motorsport) & International Formula 3000 (Team Astromega)
- Christian Klien: ADAC Berlin-Brandenburg → Formula One (Jaguar Racing)
- Marcel Lasée: Swiss Racing Team → SEAT Leon Supercopa Germany (???)
- Dong-Wook Lee: Drumel Motorsport → Retirement
- Richard Lietz: HBR Motorsport → Porsche Carrera Cup Germany (tolimit Motorsport)
- James Manderson: Swiss Racing Team → Aussie Racing Cars Super Series
- Álvaro Parente: Team Ghinzani → British Formula 3 Championship (Carlin Motorsport)
- Olivier Pla: ASM F3 → World Series by Nissan (RC Motorsport & Carlin Motorsport)
- Harold Primat: Equipe Serge Saulnier → World Series Light (Saulnier Racing)
- Stefano Proetto: Swiss Racing Team → Formula Renault V6 Eurocup (EuroInternational)
- Gilles Tinguely: Swiss Racing Team → Retirement
- Claudio Torre: HBR Motorsport → Retirement
- Hendrick Vieth: Opel Team KMS → Porsche Carrera Cup Germany (Land Motorsport-PZ Koblenz)
- Markus Winkelhock: ADAC Berlin-Brandenburg → German Formula Three Championship (Persson Motorsport)
- Sakon Yamamoto: Superfund TME → All-Japan Formula Three Championship (TOM's)

==== Midseason changes ====
- ASM driver Éric Salignon missed the last two rounds at Brno and Hockenheim, but was not immediately replaced. Adrian Sutil left Team Kolles to take over Salignon's #27 car at Hockenheim, and his Kolles seat was taken by Maximilian Götz.
- At Team KMS, Alexandros Margaritis was replaced by Brazilian Ruben Carrapataso from the Nürburgring onwards. Margaritis returned to the series with a new entry from the German F3 Cup (and former Eurseries) team, AB Racing Performance.
- At Swiss Racing Team, Dennis Furchheim was replaced by Alejandro Núñez, after missing rounds 3 and 5 and failing to qualify at Pau (round 4). His team-mate, Fernando Rees, missed rounds 3 and 4 and the #20 car was later driven by Peter Elkmann.
- Part-time appearances included Britain's Derek Hayes in a third Team Ghinzani entry at Brno
- TME's Ross Zwolsman failed to make any further appearances after the first round
- The Coloni Motorsport drivers returned to the Italian Formula Three Championship after the first two rounds
- Japan's Kohei Hirate made his Euro Series debut in a fourth Prema Powerteam entry at Zandvoort and Hockenheim.

== Calendar ==
- The series supported the Deutsche Tourenwagen Masters at eight rounds, with additional rounds at the Pau Grand Prix and the French Grand Prix.

Round		Circuit/Location	Country	Date
1	R1	Hockenheimring	Germany	17 April
1	R2	Hockenheimring	Germany	18 April
2	R1	Autódromo do Estoril	Portugal	1 May
2	R2	Autódromo do Estoril	Portugal	2 May
3	R1	Adria International Raceway	Italy	15 May
3	R2	Adria International Raceway	Italy	16 May
4	R1	Pau Circuit	France	30 May
4	R2	Pau Circuit	France	31 May
5	R1	Norisring, Nuremberg	Germany	26 June
5	R2	Norisring, Nuremberg	Germany	27 June
6	R1	Circuit de Nevers Magny-Cours	France	3 July
6	R2	Circuit de Nevers Magny-Cours	France	4 July
7	R1	Nürburgring	Germany	31 July
7	R2	Nürburgring	Germany	1 August
8	R1	Circuit Park Zandvoort	Netherlands	4 September
8	R2	Circuit Park Zandvoort	Netherlands	5 September
9	R1	Masaryk Circuit, Brno	Czech Republic	18 September
9	R2	Masaryk Circuit, Brno	Czech Republic	19 September
10	R1	Hockenheimring	Germany	2 October
10	R2	Hockenheimring	Germany	3 October

== Results ==
Round		Circuit	Pole position	Fastest lap	Winning driver	Winning team	Winning rookie
1	R1	(Germany) Hockenheimring	(France) Alexandre Prémat	(France) Alexandre Prémat	(Germany) Nico Rosberg	(Germany) Team Rosberg	(France) Franck Perera
1	R2	(Germany) Hockenheimring	(United Kingdom) Jamie Green	(United Kingdom) Jamie Green	(Germany) Nico Rosberg	(Germany) Team Rosberg	(Netherlands) Giedo van der Garde
2	R1	(Portugal) Autódromo do Estoril	(France) Alexandre Prémat	(United Kingdom) Jamie Green	(France) Alexandre Prémat	(France) ASM Formule 3	(France) Loïc Duval
2	R2	(Portugal) Autódromo do Estoril	(France) Nicolas Lapierre	(France) Éric Salignon	(France) Éric Salignon	(France) ASM Formule 3	(Brazil) Roberto Streit
3	R1	(Italy) Adria International Raceway	(Germany) Adrian Sutil	(United Kingdom) Jamie Green	(United Kingdom) Jamie Green	(France) ASM Formule 3	(Netherlands) Giedo van der Garde
3	R2	(Italy) Adria International Raceway	(United Kingdom) Jamie Green	(Canada) Bruno Spengler	(France) Éric Salignon	(France) ASM Formule 3	(France) Franck Perera
4	R1	(France) Pau Circuit	(France) Éric Salignon	(United Kingdom) Jamie Green	(United Kingdom) Jamie Green	(France) ASM Formule 3	(France) Franck Perera
4	R2	(France) Pau Circuit	(France) Alexandre Prémat	(France) Nicolas Lapierre	(France) Nicolas Lapierre	(France) Opel Team Signature-Plus	(Brazil) Roberto Streit
5	R1	(Germany) Norisring	(United Kingdom) Lewis Hamilton	(France) Alexandre Prémat	(United Kingdom) Lewis Hamilton	(United Kingdom) Manor Motorsport	(France) Loïc Duval
5	R2	(Germany) Norisring	(United Kingdom) Jamie Green	(United Kingdom) Lewis Hamilton	(France) Alexandre Prémat	(France) ASM Formule 3	(Brazil) Roberto Streit
6	R1	(France) Circuit de Nevers Magny-Cours	(United Kingdom) Jamie Green	(United Kingdom) Jamie Green	(United Kingdom) Jamie Green	(France) ASM Formule 3	(France) Loïc Duval
6	R2	(France) Circuit de Nevers Magny-Cours	(Germany) Nico Rosberg	(United Kingdom) Lewis Hamilton	(France) Alexandre Prémat	(France) ASM Formule 3	(Netherlands) Giedo van der Garde
7	R1	(Germany) Nürburgring	(United Kingdom) Jamie Green	(Germany) Nico Rosberg	(Germany) Nico Rosberg	(Germany) Team Rosberg	(Netherlands) Giedo van der Garde
7	R2	(Germany) Nürburgring	(Germany) Nico Rosberg	(United Kingdom) Jamie Green	(United Kingdom) Jamie Green	(France) ASM Formule 3	(France) Franck Perera
8	R1	(Netherlands) Circuit Park Zandvoort	(France) Éric Salignon	(France) Éric Salignon	(France) Éric Salignon	(France) ASM Formule 3	(Netherlands) Giedo van der Garde
8	R2	(Netherlands) Circuit Park Zandvoort	(France) Éric Salignon	(France) Éric Salignon	(United Kingdom) Jamie Green	(France) ASM Formule 3	(Netherlands) Giedo van der Garde
9	R1	(Czech Republic) Brno	(France) Alexandre Prémat	(United Kingdom) Jamie Green	(United Kingdom) Jamie Green	(France) ASM Formule 3	(France) Franck Perera
9	R2	(Czech Republic) Brno	(France) Alexandre Prémat	(United Kingdom) Jamie Green	(United Kingdom) Jamie Green	(France) ASM Formule 3	(Netherlands) Giedo van der Garde
10	R1	(Germany) Hockenheimring	(France) Nicolas Lapierre	(France) Alexandre Prémat	(France) Nicolas Lapierre	(France) Opel Team Signature-Plus	(France) Franck Perera
10	R2	(Germany) Hockenheimring	(Germany) Adrian Sutil	(France) Nicolas Lapierre	(France) Nicolas Lapierre	(France) Opel Team Signature-Plus	(Brazil) Roberto Streit

== Season standings ==
=== Drivers Standings ===
- Points are awarded as follows:

	1	2	3	4	5	6	7	8	PP
Race 1 & 2	10	8	6	5	4	3	2	1	**1**

Pos	Driver	HOC1 (Germany)		EST (Portugal)		ADR (Italy)		PAU (France)		NOR (Germany)		MAG (France)		NÜR (Germany)		ZAN (Netherlands)		BRN (Czech Republic)		HOC2 (Germany)		Pts
1	(United Kingdom) Jamie Green	4	**2**	2	2	1	**8**	1	3	6	**2**	**1**	9	**2**	1	DSQ	1	1	1	10	2	139
2	(France) Alexandre Prémat	**2**	3	**1**	8	8	Ret	DSQ	**DSQ**	18†	1	Ret	1	6	5	5	3	**2**	**2**	18†	4	88
3	(France) Nicolas Lapierre	8	Ret	3	**3**	14	4	2	1	15	5	8	4	8	6	2	4	9	Ret	**1**	1	85
4	(Germany) Nico Rosberg	1	1	Ret	4	5	Ret	Ret	Ret	4	17	6	**2**	1	**3**	Ret	DNS	4	11	8	8	70
5	(United Kingdom) Lewis Hamilton	11	6	Ret	9	Ret	5	4	7	**1**	3	Ret	21	3	4	3	6	7	4	2	6	68
6	(France) Éric Salignon	5	5	Ret	1	22	1	Ret^{1}	4	7	9	2	Ret	11	Ret	**1**	**2**					64
7	(Poland) Robert Kubica	6	7	9	23	17	Ret	3	2	19†	4	9	5	5	2	8	5	10	8	4	7	53
8	(France) Franck Perera	3	19	8	7	DSQ	2	5	6	3	19†	10	8	10	8	6	9	3	6	5	11	48
9	(Netherlands) Giedo van der Garde	9	4	16	6	3	6	12	Ret	Ret	12	18	7	7	12	4	8	5	3	12	22†	37
10	(Brazil) Roberto Streit	12	15	20	5	21†	11	8	5	5	7	7	10	13	15	22†	12	6	7	17	3	28
11	(Canada) Bruno Spengler	7	Ret	10	10	7	20	6	Ret	8	6	5	3	9	7	13	11	11	5	21†	9	27
12	(France) Loïc Duval	16	14	5	20	19	14	7	Ret	2	8	3	Ret	14	23	Ret	Ret	8	13	11	18	22
13	(Greece) Alexandros Margaritis	13	8	6	15	6	9	DSQ	DSQ	16	20†	4	Ret	23	13	11	10	Ret	16	7	5	18
14	(Germany) Daniel la Rosa	25†	9	11	11	18	3	DNS	DNS	10	Ret	15	15	4	Ret	7	7	Ret	15	Ret	12	15
15	(Japan) Katsuyuki Hiranaka	14	13	19	14	2	16	9	8	9	22†	Ret	22	24†	14	10	13	13	12	14	17	9
16	(Netherlands) Charles Zwolsman Jr.	Ret	10	15	12	13	17	10	Ret	Ret	Ret	12	6	12	10	17	20	14	10	3	13	9
17	(Germany) Adrian Sutil	Ret	22	Ret	13	**4**	7	11	Ret	Ret	11	13	11	15	11	15	15	15	17	20†	**Ret**	9
18	(Germany) Dennis Furchheim	18	23†	4	Ret																	5
19	(Germany) Maximilian Götz	10	11	17	Ret	10	13	14	9	11	10	16	13	16	22	9	16	19	24	6	15	3
20	(United Kingdom) Tom Kimber-Smith	21	Ret	7	21	9	Ret	13	10	DSQ	21	Ret	Ret	DSQ	DSQ	14	Ret	18	23	22†	Ret	2
21	(Austria) Andreas Zuber	19	Ret	21	Ret	20	Ret	Ret	Ret	Ret	Ret	20	Ret	19	16	23†	Ret	12	9	Ret	10	0
22	(Austria) Philipp Baron	26†	Ret	22	22	12	19	15	13	12	13	19	14	22	Ret	21	19	16	18	9	Ret	0
23	(Austria) Hannes Neuhauser	23	21	13	18	15	18	Ret	14	13	16	14	16	17	9	Ret	14	Ret	14	DSQ	20	0
24	(Germany) Robert Kath	17	20	18	24	11	10	16	12	Ret	18	11	12									0
25	(Italy) Marco Bonanomi	Ret	24	14	17	DSQ	12	Ret	11	14	Ret	Ret	17	18	17	12	17	Ret	19	16	Ret	0
26	(Finland) Toni Vilander	15	12	Ret	16																	0
27	(San Marino) Christian Montanari	20	16	12	Ret																	0
28	(Japan) Kohei Hirate															16	Ret			13	14	0
29	(Belgium) Gregory Franchi	22	17	23	19	16	15	Ret	Ret	Ret	14	17	20	21	18	Ret	21			Ret	DNS	0
30	(Germany) Peter Elkmann									17	15	Ret	19	Ret	20	18	Ret	17	20	15	16	0
31	(Spain) Alejandro Núñez											21†	18	20	21	20	18	Ret	22	19†	19	0
32	(Netherlands) Ross Zwolsman	24	18																			0
33	(Brazil) Ruben Carrapatoso													Ret	19	19	Ret	21	Ret	Ret	21	0
34	(United Kingdom) Derek Hayes																	20	21			0
	(Brazil) Fernando Rees	Ret	Ret																			0
Pos	Driver	HOC1 (Germany)		EST (Portugal)		ADR (Italy)		PAU (France)		NOR (Germany)		MAG (France)		NÜR (Germany)		ZAN (Netherlands)		BRN (Czech Republic)		HOC2 (Germany)		Pts

Colour	Result
Gold	Winner
Silver	Second place
Bronze	Third place
Green	Points classification
Blue	Non-points classification
Blue	Non-classified finish (NC)
Purple	Retired, not classified (Ret)
Red	Did not qualify (DNQ)
Red	Did not pre-qualify (DNPQ)
Black	Disqualified (DSQ)
White	Did not start (DNS)
White	Withdrew (WD)
White	Race cancelled (C)
Blank	Did not practice (DNP)
Blank	Did not arrive (DNA)
Blank	Excluded (EX)

**Bold** – Pole
Italics – Fastest Lap

† — Drivers did not finish the race, but were classified as they completed over 90% of the race distance.

^{1} Note: Éric Salignon's pole position for race 1 at Pau was initially withdrawn due to a 10-place grid penalty for an engine change after an accident in race 1. Salignon's team successfully claimed force majeure and the pole was reinstated, but the bonus point was not awarded.

=== Rookie Cup ===
Rookie drivers are only eligible for the Rookie Cup title if they have not previously competed in a national or international Formula 3 championship.

Pos	Driver	HOC1 (Germany)		EST (Portugal)		ADR (Italy)		PAU (France)		NOR (Germany)		MAG (France)		NÜR (Germany)		ZAN (Netherlands)		BRN (Czech Republic)		HOC2 (Germany)		Pts
1	(France) Franck Perera	3	19	8	7	DSQ	2	5	6	3	19	10	8	10	8	6	9	3	6	5	11	147
2	(Netherlands) Giedo van der Garde	9	4	16	6	3	6	12	Ret	Ret	12	18	7	7	12	4	8	5	3	12	22	130
3	(Brazil) Roberto Streit	12	15	20	5	21	11	8	5	5	7	7	10	13	15	22	12	6	7	17	3	116
4	(France) Loïc Duval	16	14	5	20	19	14	7	Ret	2	8	3	Ret	14	23	Ret	Ret	8	13	11	18	91
5	(Germany) Maximilian Götz	10	11	17	Ret	10	13	14	9	11	10	16	13	16	22	9	16	19	24	6	15	82
6	(Germany) Adrian Sutil	Ret	22	Ret	13	**4**	7	11	Ret	Ret	11	13	11	15	11	15	15	15	17	20	**Ret**	72
7	(United Kingdom) Tom Kimber-Smith	21	Ret	7	21	9	Ret	13	10	DSQ	21	Ret	Ret	DSQ	DSQ	14	Ret	18	23	22	Ret	36
8	(Germany) Robert Kath	17	20	18	24	11	10	16	12	Ret	18	11	12									36
9	(Germany) Peter Elkmann									17	15	Ret	19	Ret	20	18	Ret	17	20	15	16	28
10	(Japan) Kohei Hirate															16	Ret			13	14	13
Pos	Driver	HOC1 (Germany)		EST (Portugal)		ADR (Italy)		PAU (France)		NOR (Germany)		MAG (France)		NÜR (Germany)		ZAN (Netherlands)		BRN (Czech Republic)		HOC2 (Germany)		Pts

=== Nations Cup ===
	Nation	Points
1	France	256
2	Great Britain	211
3	Germany	107
4	Poland	61
5	Netherlands	50
6	Canada	31
7	Brazil	29
8	Greece	21
9	Japan	13
10	Austria	1

== See also ==
- 2004 Masters of Formula 3
