= Nicolas Lapierre =

French racing driver (born 1984)

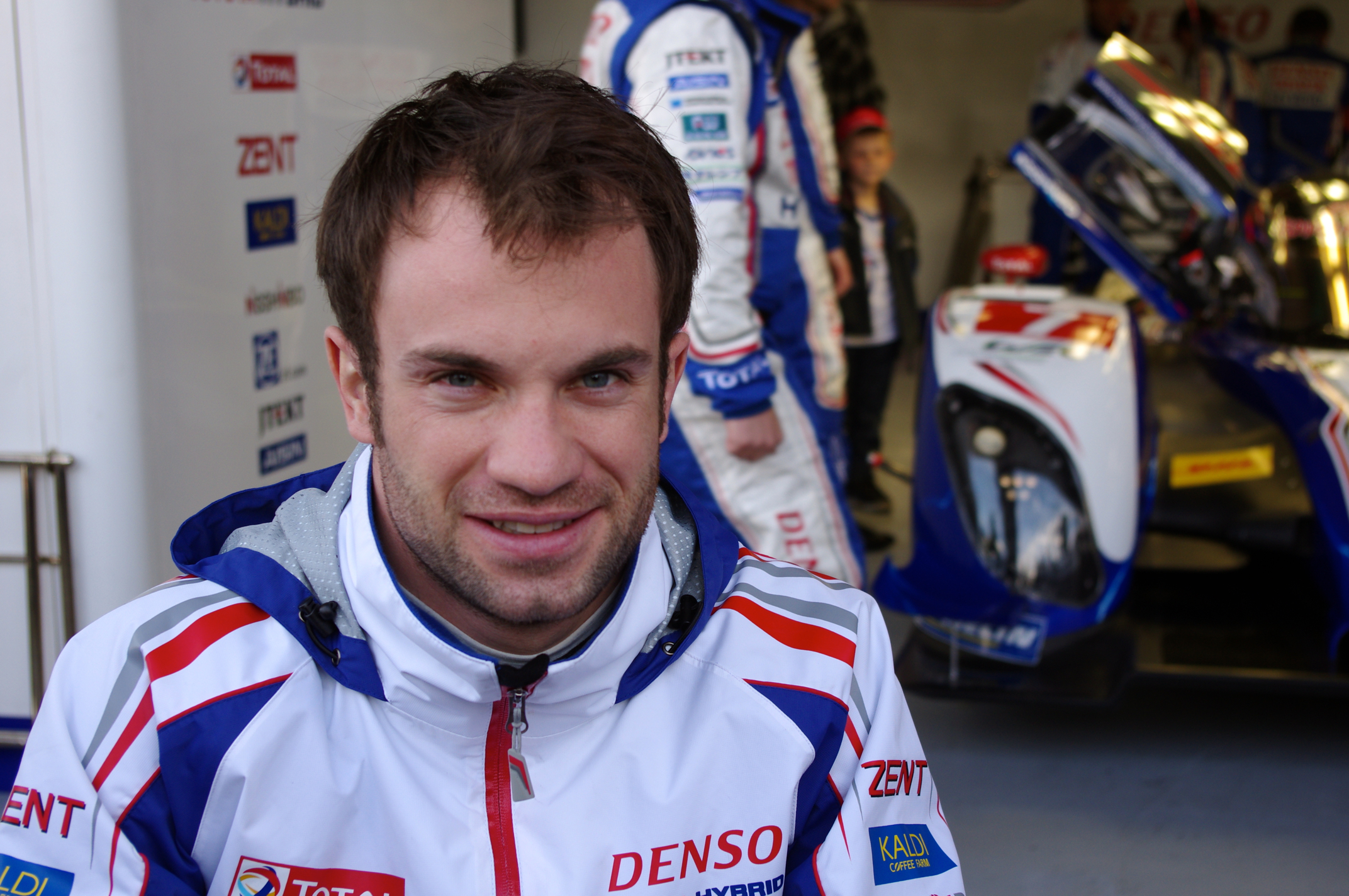
- Lapierre at the 2013 6 Hours of Silverstone
- Nationality: (France) French
- Born: Nicolas Camile Bernard Lapierre; 2 April 1984 (age 42) Thonon-les-Bains, France
- Categorisation: FIA Platinum

Previous series
- 2007 2005–2007 2005–06–2007–08 2004 2003–2004 2002 2001–2002 2000–2002: 24 Hours of Le Mans (GT1); GP2 Series; A1 Grand Prix; British Formula 3 Formula 3 Euroseries; French Formula 3 French Formula Renault 2000; Formula Renault 2000 Eurocup

Championship titles
- 2016, 2018-19 2005–06: FIA Endurance Trophy for LMP2 Drivers; A1 Grand Prix

24 Hours of Le Mans career
- Years: 2007, 2009 – 2024
- Teams: Oreca, Toyota, KCMG, Signatech Alpine, Cool Racing
- Best finish: 3rd (2014 and 2021)
- Class wins: 4 in LMP2 (2015, 2016, 2018, 2019)

Nicolas Camile Bernard Lapierre (born 2 April 1984) is a French former professional racing driver and team principal.

Notable for winning the LMP2 class four times at the 24 Hours of Le Mans, Lapierre was a factory driver at Toyota during the early days of the FIA World Endurance Championship, before becoming a staple of the Alpine team until his retirement in 2024. He later served as Alpine sporting director and CLX Motorsport team principal. Lapierre is also a two-time winner of the 12 Hours of Sebring and the 2003 winner of the Macau Grand Prix.

== Early career ==
=== Formative years ===
Born in Thonon-les-Bains, Lapierre started his career in 1993 in karting, finishing third in the French championship in 1996, 6th in the European Championships in 1997 and reaching the finals of the European Junior Championship in 1998 before moving to French Formula Renault in 1999. He stayed there for 2000 and 2001, 2001 also seeing two races in Formula Renault 2000 Eurocup. He again raced in French Formula Renault in 2002, also driving a full season of 2000 Eurocup and some races of French Formula Three (most of them being in the main class, although he drove two races in the B-Class also).

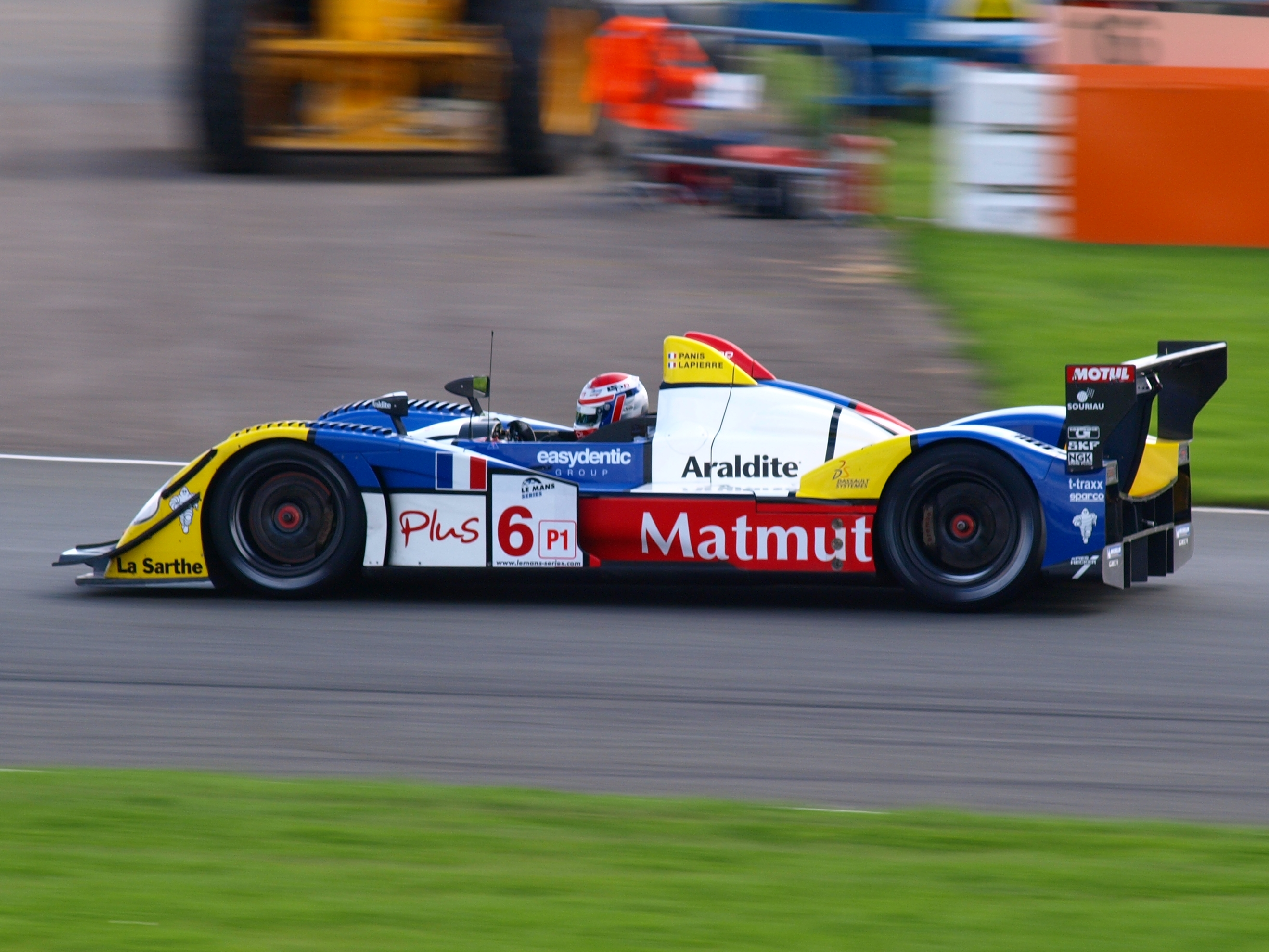
Lapierre competing at the 2008 1000km of Silverstone.

2003 saw Lapierre move to Formula Three Euroseries with the Signature team. Though his campaign only yielded a sole podium finish and pole position respectively, leading him to finish 11th overall, the Frenchman would shine on the streets of Macau, winning the prestigious Macau Grand Prix. He stayed in the Euroseries for 2004, once again driving for Signature. With a victory at Pau and two wins at the Hockenheimring, Lapierre ended up third in the standings.

=== GP2 & A1GP ===
Following his Euro Series success, Lapierre progressed into the newly restructured GP2 Series in 2005, partnering Heikki Kovalainen at Arden International. Lapierre scored the first pole position of the championship's history but was unable to start the race. This led onto a disappointing season for Lapierre, who ended up 12th in the standings after scoring just one podium, whilst teammate Kovalainen came second. Near the end of the year and going into 2006, Lapierre drove for A1 Team France in numerous races of the A1 Grand Prix series. By winning both the sprint and main race events in Germany and Australia, the main race in Dubai and the sprint in Indonesia, he was able to help Team France to win the championship title.

Lapierre continued driving for Arden in 2006, starting the season off well by taking three podium finishes in the opening three rounds. However, a crash caused by a competitor at Monaco resulted in two compressed vertebrae for Lapierre, who was forced to miss two rounds. He returned for the final four events, though his three points results would only bring him to ninth overall by the end of the year. Going into 2007, Lapierre once again drove for the French team in A1 GP whilst signing for DAMS in GP2. In a year plagued with a heap of retirements, Lapierre was able to score his first win in the series during the Bahrain sprint race, meanwhile a victory from pole during the Spa feature race proved to be a bookending one for Lapierre's GP2 career, which he ended sitting 12th in the overall standings.

== Sportscar career ==
Having driven in the GT1 class of the 2007 24 Hours of Le Mans for Team Oreca, Lapierre made a full-time switch to sportscars in 2008, competing in the LMP1 category of the Le Mans Series with Team Oreca-Matmut alongside former F1 driver Olivier Panis. The duo retired from three races, though they were able to claim a podium at the series's crown jewel event: the 1000 km of Spa. The following year saw Lapierre return to Oreca-Matmut, where he and Panis scored two pole positions and won the season-ending race at Silverstone. Lapierre also drove at Le Mans that year, finishing fifth alongside Panis and Soheil Ayari.

For the 2010 season, Lapierre once again drove for Oreca-Matmut, this time piloting a Peugeot 908 HDi FAP. He finished second in the drivers' championship of the Le Mans Series, having won from pole at the Algarve. At Le Mans, Lapierre, Panis, and Loïc Duval were fighting for a spot on the podium until Sunday morning, when a major oil fire caused the team's retirement. Lapierre entered his final year with Oreca-Matmut in 2011, this time focusing on the new Intercontinental Le Mans Cup. Alongside his 2010 Le Mans teammates, Lapierre beat the Peugeot works entry by winning the opening race at Sebring, a result which helped the team, which only entered four of the season's eight events, to finish fourth in the standings.

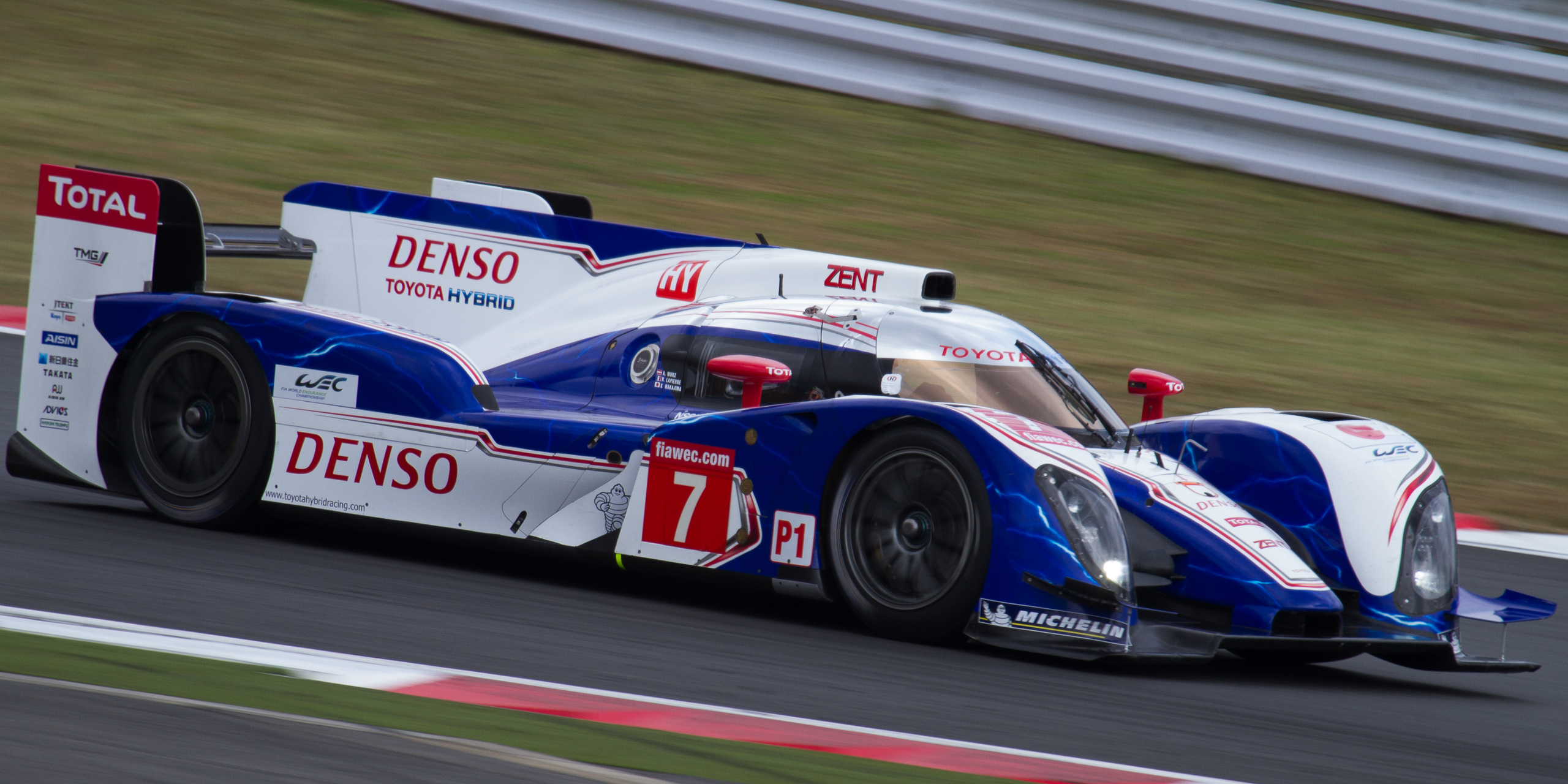
Lapierre took the overall victory of the 2012 6 Hours of Fuji, Toyota's home race.

Lapierre became a factory driver for Toyota in 2012 as part of their programme in the newly-formed FIA World Endurance Championship, where he and Alexander Wurz would be driving the Toyota TS030 Hybrid No. 7 entry from the 24 Hours of Le Mans onwards. Despite retiring at Le Mans, where Lapierre had briefly taken the lead going into the late hours of Saturday evening, due to an engine failure, the team managed to finish third in the standings, as Lapierre and Wurz took wins at São Paulo, Fuji, and Shanghai. In 2013, Lapierre remained in the WEC together with Wurz and Kazuki Nakajima. The season proved to be challenging during its first half, with the car retiring at Spa and not being entered at two races. However, victory in Japan (where the race was abandoned after 16 laps behind the safety car due to wet conditions) and a second place from pole in China put the team back to fourth in the standings. 2014 would be Lapierre's final season with Toyota, as he contested the first four races of the WEC season alongside Anthony Davidson and Sébastien Buemi. Strong showings at Silverstone and Spa yielded two victories for the #8, meanwhile Lapierre scored his best Le Mans result to date with a third place overall. Following another podium at Circuit of the Americas, Toyota decided to drop Lapierre from the lineup, with "personal reasons" — one of Lapierre's family members supposedly fighting against a serious illness — being cited amidst rumours of the manufacturer reacting to two accidents Lapierre suffered in wet conditions at Le Mans and Austin. He was initially confirmed as one of their drivers for the 2015 season, but lost his race seat in January of that year.

Going into 2015, Lapierre stepped down into the LMP2 category, taking part in three races of the WEC with KCMG alongside Richard Bradley and Matthew Howson, replacing Nick Tandy for the Brit's Porsche-related absences. He finished all three races on the class podium, highlighted by a victory at Le Mans where, despite a late off from Lapierre that required marshal assistance to get the car going, KCMG took a controlling victory. The same year also saw Lapierre drive for Thiriet by TDS Racing in the final round of the European Le Mans Series, which he won after a charging performance. Finally, he also drove in the final four events of the World Touring Car Championship as part of the Lada works team.

Lapierre made LMP2 his home for the 2016 season, driving for Signatech Alpine in the WEC and with DragonSpeed in the ELMS. Partnering Gustavo Menezes and Stéphane Richelmi in the former, the Frenchman would distinguish himself by leading the team towards a dominant title; the team scored seven podiums, including a class win at the 24 Hours and three further victories. Two retirements in the latter meanwhile prevented the DragonSpeed crew from fighting for the title, though Lapierre, Ben Hanley, and bronze-ranked Henrik Hedman managed to finish the season fourth overall after winning from pole at Spa. Lapierre returned to Alpine for the 2017 WEC season, though he would be driving the third Toyota entry for the races at Spa and Le Mans. Once he returned to Alpine, Lapierre was able to improve their fortunes, scoring five successive podiums and winning the race in Austin. This late surge propelled the team to third in the standings. Additionally, Lapierre re-joined DragonSpeed in the ELMS in 2017, though his three pole positions could not prevent the team from finishing eighth in the standings.

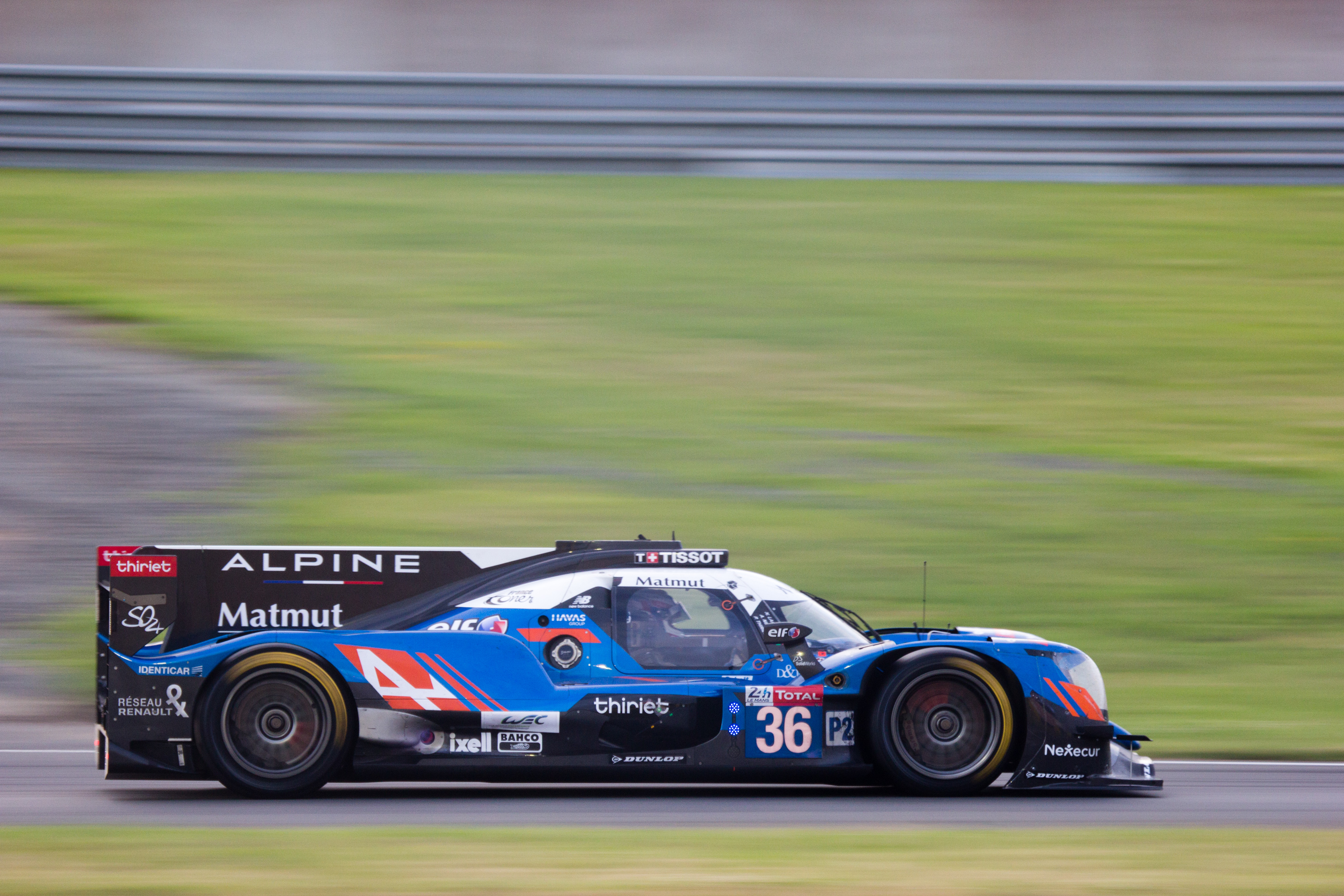
Lapierre took the LMP2 class victory of the 2018 24 Hours of Le Mans

For the 2018–19 WEC "Super Season" Lapierre returned to Alpine on a full-time basis, partnering André Negrão and silver-ranked Pierre Thiriet. Throughout the campaign, the trio proved to be the class of the field, as they finished on the podium in each of the eight races on their way to the LMP2 title. Their two wins that season were both achieved at Le Mans: in 2018, Alpine inherited victory after a disqualification for G-Drive Racing, whereas the 2019 race was won after a secure performance, making Lapierre a four-time class winner at Le Mans in as many races. During this time, the Frenchman kept competing in the ELMS, moving to Cool Racing in 2019 after a final campaign for DragonSpeed. He remained at the team going into the 2019–20 WEC season, helping the team to take their maiden victory at the opening race in Silverstone. At the end of 2020, in a season which the team finished sixth out of eight teams (having fielded a bronze driver with team owner Alexandre Coigny), Lapierre became part of the Cool Racing team as its new team principal, as the outfit was renamed to Cool Racing / CLX Motorsport — the L in CLX standing for Lapierre.

Lapierre entered the Le Mans Hypercar class of the WEC with Alpine in 2021, driving the grandfathered Alpine A480 together with Matthieu Vaxivière and André Negrão. In a year where the only other full-time entrant Toyota dominated, the Alpine trio finished all six races on the podium and ended up third in the championship. The French team returned with a strong performance at the season opener of the 2022 season, winning the shortened event at Sebring. After a challenging Le Mans event the team won at Monza, though they were unable to hold the championship lead, eventually losing out to the No. 8 Toyota. As the usage of former LMP1 machines was disallowed in 2023, Lapierre instead focused on the LMP2 Pro-Am class of the ELMS with Cool Racing, where he had been driving for the past three years parallel to his Alpine exploits. Driving alongside Alexandre Coigny and Peugeot reserve driver Malthe Jakobsen, Lapierre helped the team towards two Pro-Am victories at Spa and Algarve, though the squad narrowly lost out on the title to the AF Corse crew in the season finale. The trio also took part in the same subclass at Le Mans, where they finished second.

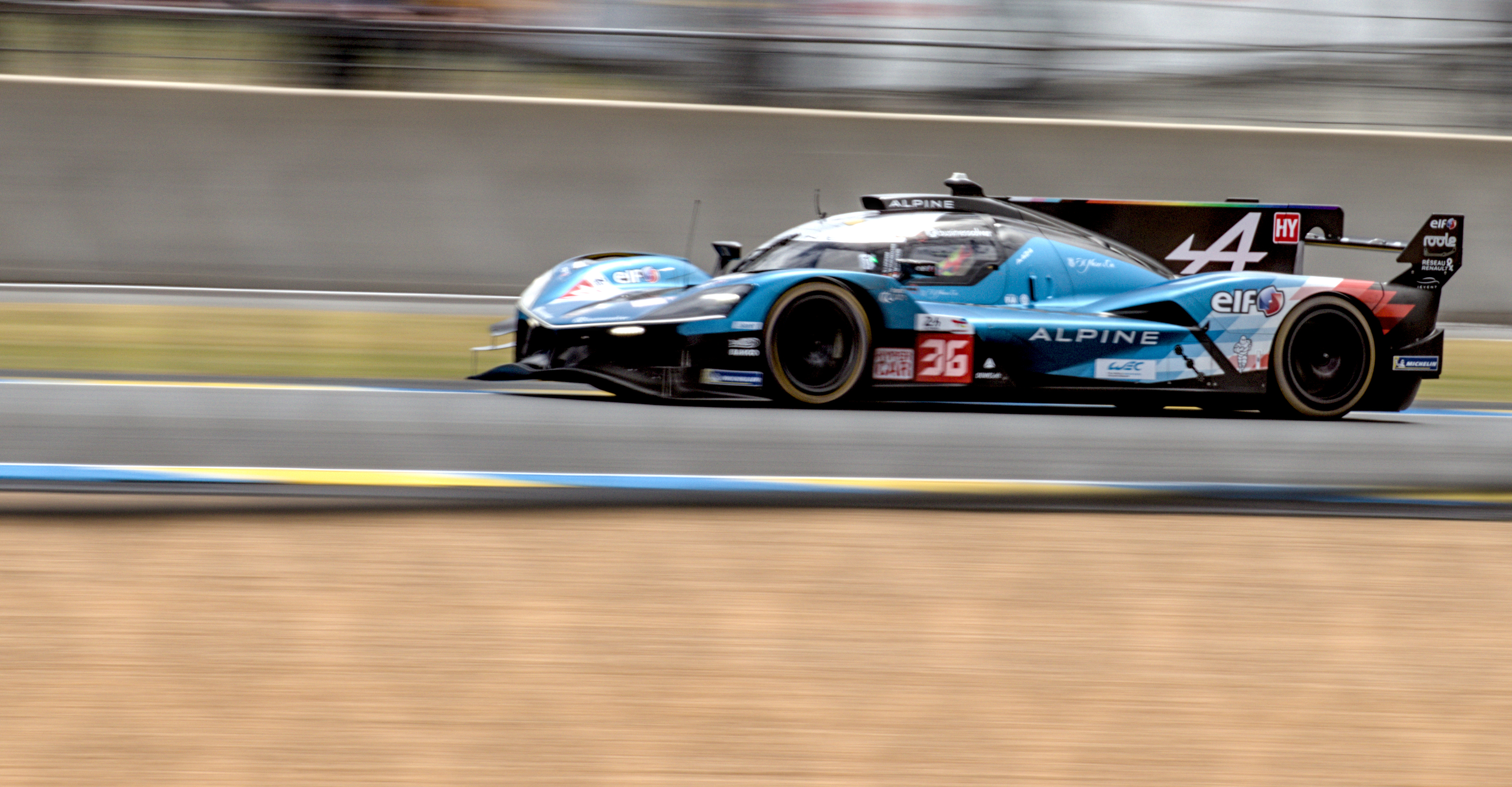
Lapierre's A424 car at the 2024 24 Hours of Le Mans.

Having completed a testing programme for Alpine's Hypercar, the A424, Lapierre became part of their WEC lineup again in 2024, driving the #36 alongside Vaxivière and Mick Schumacher.

Lapierre would announce his retirement on 2 October 2024 prior to the conclusion of the 2024 WEC season in Bahrain. The 2024 6 Hours of Fuji would be his final motor race, completing the event with a podium finish in 3rd with the A424 alongside Vaxivière and Schumacher. Lapierre stated that he would turn his focus towards his team principal role at COOL Racing. Two days later, Lapierre was named Sporting Director for Alpine's endurance team in 2025, working under team principal Philippe Sinault.

== Racing record ==
=== Career summary ===
Season	Series	Team	Races	Wins	Poles	F/Laps	Podiums	Points	Position
2000	Formula Renault 2000 Eurocup	LSP Racing	?	0	?	0	0	12	20th
2000	Formula Renault 2000 France	LSP Racing	8	0	0	0	0	0	NC
2001	Formula Renault 2000 Eurocup	Tech 1 Racing	2	0	0	0	0	4	27th
2001	Formula Renault 2000 France	Tech 1 Racing	11	0	0	1	0	65	8th
2002	French Formula 3 Championship	Signature	4	0	0	0	0	15	13th
2002	French Formula 3 Championship - Class B	Optirace Sport	2	2	0	0	2	40	6th
2002	Formula Renault 2000 Eurocup	Graff Racing	8	0	1	2	3	120	**3rd**
2002	Formula Renault 2000 France	Graff Racing	3	0	0	1	1	24	9th
2003	Formula 3 Euroseries	Signature Plus	20	0	1	0	1	33	11th
2003	Masters of Formula 3	Signature Plus	1	0	0	0	0	N/A	4th
2003	Korea Super Prix	Signature Plus	1	0	0	0	0	N/A	19th
2003	Macau Grand Prix	Signature Team	1	1	0	0	1	N/A	**1st**
2004	Formula 3 Euroseries	Opel Team Signature-Plus	20	3	2	2	7	85	**3rd**
2004	Masters of Formula 3	Opel Team Signature-Plus	1	0	0	0	0	N/A	31st
2004	Formula 3 European Cup	Opel Team Signature-Plus	1	0	0	0	0	N/A	10th
2004	British Formula 3 International Series	Opel Signature	1	0	0	0	0	0	NC†
2005	GP2 Series	Arden International	23	0	1	1	1	21	12th
2005-06	A1 Grand Prix	A1 Team France	11	6	2	4	7	172‡	**1st‡**
2006	GP2 Series	Arden International Ltd	18	0	0	1	3	32	9th
2006-07	A1 Grand Prix	A1 Team France	10	0	0	0	4	67‡	4th‡
2007	GP2 Series	DAMS	20	2	1	2	2	23	12th
2007	24 Hours of Le Mans - GT1	Team Oreca	1	0	0	0	0	N/A	9th
2007-08	A1 Grand Prix	A1 Team France	2	0	0	0	0	118‡	4th‡
2008	Le Mans Series - LMP1	Team Oreca-Matmut	5	0	0	0	1	6	18th
2009	Le Mans Series - LMP1	Team Oreca Matmut - AIM	4	1	2	1	2	22	**3rd**
2009	24 Hours of Le Mans - LMP1	Team Oreca Matmut - AIM	1	0	0	0	0	N/A	5th
2009	American Le Mans Series - LMP1	Team Oreca Matmut - AIM	1	0	0	0	0	18	17th
2009	Asian Le Mans Series - LMP1	Team Oreca Matmut - AIM	2	0	0	0	2	14	**3rd**
2010	Le Mans Series - LMP1	Team Oreca-Matmut	5	1	2	3	2	63	**2nd**
2010	24 Hours of Le Mans - LMP1	Team Oreca-Matmut	1	0	0	0	0	N/A	DNF
2011	Le Mans Series - LMP1	Team Oreca-Matmut	1	0	0	0	0	0	NC
2011	24 Hours of Le Mans - LMP1	Team Oreca-Matmut	1	0	0	0	0	N/A	5th
2011	American Le Mans Series - LMP1	Team Oreca-Matmut	2	1	0	0	2	0	NC†
2011	Intercontinental Le Mans Cup - LMP1	Team Oreca-Matmut	4	1	0	0	2	47‡	4th‡
2011	Blancpain Endurance Series - Pro Am	Graff Racing	1	0	0	0	0	9	20th
2012	FIA World Endurance Championship	Toyota Racing	6	3	3	3	4	96	**3rd**
2012	24 Hours of Le Mans - LMP1	Toyota Racing	1	0	0	0	0	N/A	DNF
2013	FIA World Endurance Championship	Toyota Racing	6	1	2	0	2	69.5	4th
2013	24 Hours of Le Mans - LMP1	Toyota Racing	1	0	0	0	0	N/A	4th
2013	Blancpain Endurance Series	Pro GT by Alméras	1	0	0	0	0	8	28th
2014	FIA World Endurance Championship	Toyota Racing	4	2	1	0	4	96	6th
2014	24 Hours of Le Mans - LMP1	Toyota Racing	1	0	0	0	1	N/A	**3rd**
2014	Blancpain Endurance Series	ART Grand Prix	2	0	0	0	1	18	16th
2015	FIA World Endurance Championship - LMP2	KCMG	3	1	1	1	3	84	5th
2015	24 Hours of Le Mans - LMP2	KCMG	1	1	1	0	1	N/A	**1st**
2015	European Le Mans Series - LMP2	Thiriet by TDS Racing	1	1	0	0	1	25	11th
2015	Blancpain Endurance Series	Von Ryan Racing	2	0	0	0	0	0	NC
2015	World Touring Car Championship	Lada Sport Rosneft	7	0	0	0	0	8	16th
2015-16	Formula E	Team Aguri	Test driver						
2016	FIA World Endurance Championship - LMP2	Signatech Alpine	9	4	2	0	7	199	**1st**
2016	24 Hours of Le Mans - LMP2	Signatech Alpine	1	1	0	0	1	N/A	**1st**
2016	European Le Mans Series - LMP2	DragonSpeed	6	1	3	2	4	76	4th
2016	IMSA SportsCar Championship - Prototype	DragonSpeed	1	0	0	0	0	29	26th
2017	FIA World Endurance Championship	Signatech Alpine Matmut	7	0	0	0	0	60	12th
2017	FIA World Endurance Championship	Toyota Gazoo Racing	2	0	0	0	0	60	12th
2017	FIA World Endurance Championship - LMP2	Signatech Alpine Matmut	7	1	2	2	5	121	6th
2017	24 Hours of Le Mans - LMP1	Toyota Gazoo Racing	1	0	0	0	0	N/A	DNF
2017	European Le Mans Series - LMP2	DragonSpeed	6	0	3	2	1	39	11th
2017	IMSA SportsCar Championship - Prototype	DragonSpeed	1	0	0	0	0	21	39th
2018	European Le Mans Series - LMP2	DragonSpeed	6	0	1	1	2	50.5	7th
2018	IMSA SportsCar Championship - Prototype	Tequila Patrón ESM	3	1	0	0	1	63	32nd
2018	24 Hours of Le Mans - LMP2	Signatech Alpine Matmut	1	1	0	0	1	N/A	**1st**
2018-19	FIA World Endurance Championship - LMP2	Signatech Alpine Matmut	8	2	1	0	8	181	**1st**
2019	24 Hours of Le Mans - LMP2	Signatech Alpine Matmut	1	1	0	0	1	N/A	**1st**
2019	European Le Mans Series - LMP2	Cool Racing	6	0	1	1	2	44.5	10th
2019	IMSA SportsCar Championship - LMP2	DragonSpeed	1	0	1	1	1	30	13th
2019-20	FIA World Endurance Championship - LMP2	Cool Racing	7	1	2	0	2	103	9th
2020	24 Hours of Le Mans - LMP2	Cool Racing	1	0	0	0	0	N/A	4th
2020	European Le Mans Series - LMP2	Cool Racing	5	0	0	0	0	28.5	8th
2020	IMSA SportsCar Championship - LMP2	Tower Motorsport by Starworks	1	0	0	1	0	0	NC†
2021	FIA World Endurance Championship - Hypercar	Alpine Elf Matmut	6	0	1	1	6	128	**3rd**
2021	24 Hours of Le Mans - Hypercar	Alpine Elf Matmut	1	0	0	0	0	N/A	**3rd**
2021	European Le Mans Series - LMP2	Cool Racing	6	0	2	2	0	25	15th
2021	IMSA SportsCar Championship - LMP2	PR1/Mathiasen Motorsports	2	1	2	0	1	0	NC†
2022	FIA World Endurance Championship - Hypercar	Alpine Elf Team	6	2	1	0	5	144	**2nd**
2022	24 Hours of Le Mans - Hypercar	Alpine Elf Team	1	0	0	0	0	N/A	5th
2022	IMSA SportsCar Championship - LMP2	PR1/Mathiasen Motorsports	1	0	1	0	0	0	NC†
2022	European Le Mans Series - LMP2	Cool Racing	6	0	1	0	3	70	5th
2023	European Le Mans Series - LMP2 Pro-Am	Cool Racing	6	2	0	0	5	101	**2nd**
2023	Asian Le Mans Series - LMP2	Cool Racing	2	0	0	1	0	14	12th
2023	24 Hours of Le Mans - LMP2	Cool Racing	1	0	0	0	0	N/A	12th
2023	IMSA SportsCar Championship - LMP2	PR1/Mathiasen Motorsports	1	0	1	1	0	0	NC†
2023	FIA World Endurance Championship - LMP2	Alpine Elf Team	Development driver						
2024	FIA World Endurance Championship - Hypercar	Alpine Endurance Team	7	0	0	0	1	18	23rd

† Ineligible for points ‡ Teams Standings

=== Complete Formula Renault 2.0 Eurocup results ===
(key) (Races in bold indicate pole position) (Races in italics indicate fastest lap)

Year	Entrant	1	2	3	4	5	6	7	8	9	10	DC	Points
2001	Tech 1 Racing	MNZ	BRN	MAG	SIL	ZOL	HUN	SPI; 9	NÜR	JAR	EST; 15	27th	4
2002	Graff Racing	MAG; 5	**SIL**; **2**	JAR; 2	AND; 9	OSC; 7	SPA; 6	IMO; 3	DON; 5	EST		3rd	120

=== Complete French Formula Three Championship results ===
(key) (Races in bold indicate pole position) (Races in italics indicate fastest lap)

Year	Entrant	Chassis	Engine	Class	1	2	3	4	5	6	7	8	9	10	11	12	13	14	DC	Points
2002	Optirace Sport	Dallara F399	Renault	B	NOG; 1	NOG; 2	LÉD; 1	LÉD; 2	DIJ; 1	DIJ; 2	CRO; 1; 8	CRO; 2; 3							6th	40
2002	Signatech	Dallara F302	Renault	A									ALB; 1; 8	ALB; 2; 9	LMS; 1	LMS; 2	MAG; 1; 9	MAG; 2; 10	13th	15

=== Complete Formula 3 Euro Series results ===
(key) (Races in bold indicate pole position) (Races in italics indicate fastest lap)

Year	Entrant	Chassis	Engine	1	2	3	4	5	6	7	8	9	10	11	12	13	14	15	16	17	18	19	20	DC	Points
2003	Signature Plus	Dallara F302/043	Sodemo	HOC; 1; 5	HOC; 2 Ret	ADR; 1; 6	ADR; 2; 11	**PAU**; **1** DSQ	PAU; 2; 15	NOR; 1; 6	NOR; 2; 6	LMS; 1; 13	LMS; 2; 5	NÜR; 1; 11	NÜR; 2 Ret	A1R; 1; 16	A1R; 2; 10	ZAN; 1; 9	ZAN; 2; 9	HOC; 1; 3	HOC; 2; 7	MAG; 1; 5	MAG; 2; 6	11th	33
2004	Opel Team Signature-Plus	Dallara F304/004	Spiess-Opel	HOC; 1; 8	HOC; 2 Ret	EST; 1; 3	**EST**; **2**; 3	ADR; 1; 14	ADR; 1; 4	PAU; 1; 2	PAU; 2; 1	NOR; 1; 15	NOR; 1; 5	MAG; 1; 8	MAG; 2; 4	NÜR; 1; 8	NÜR; 2; 6	ZAN; 1; 2	ZAN; 2; 4	BRN; 1; 9	BRN; 2 Ret	**HOC**; **1**; 1	HOC; 2; 1	**3rd**	**85**

=== Complete GP2 Series results ===
(key) (Races in bold indicate pole position) (Races in italics indicate fastest lap)

Year	Entrant	1	2	3	4	5	6	7	8	9	10	11	12	13	14	15	16	17	18	19	20	21	22	23	DC	Points
2005	Arden International	**IMO**; **FEA**; DNS	IMO; SPR; Ret	CAT; FEA; 11	CAT; SPR; 9	MON; FEA; Ret	NÜR; FEA; 12	NÜR; SPR; Ret	MAG; FEA; 3	MAG; SPR; 5	SIL; FEA; 10	SIL; SPR; Ret	HOC; FEA; 9	HOC; SPR; 7	HUN; FEA; 12	HUN; SPR; 6	IST; FEA; Ret	IST; SPR; 13	MNZ; FEA; 4	MNZ; SPR; Ret	SPA; FEA; Ret	SPA; SPR; 23^{†}	BHR; FEA; 6	BHR; SPR; 20	12th	21
2006	Arden International Ltd	VAL; FEA; 4	VAL; SPR; 3	IMO; FEA; 3	IMO; SPR; 7	NÜR; FEA; 5	NÜR; SPR; 2	CAT; FEA; Ret	CAT; SPR; Ret	MON; FEA; Ret	SIL; FEA	SIL; SPR	MAG; FEA	MAG; SPR	HOC; FEA; 20	HOC; SPR; 7	HUN; FEA; Ret	HUN; SPR; Ret	IST; FEA; 14	IST; SPR; 6	MNZ; FEA; 6	MNZ; SPR; 4			9th	32
2007	DAMS	BHR; FEA; 7	BHR; SPR; 1	CAT; FEA; Ret	CAT; SPR; DNS	MON; FEA; Ret	MAG; FEA; 8	MAG; SPR; Ret	SIL; FEA; Ret	SIL; SPR; DNS	NÜR; FEA; 9	NÜR; SPR; Ret	HUN; FEA; Ret	HUN; SPR; 14	IST; FEA; 15	IST; SPR; Ret	MNZ; FEA; 10	MNZ; SPR; 17^{†}	**SPA**; **FEA**; 1	SPA; SPR; 21	VAL; FEA; Ret	VAL; SPR; 21			12th	23

=== Complete A1 Grand Prix results ===
(key) (Races in bold indicate pole position) (Races in italics indicate fastest lap)

Year	Entrant	1	2	3	4	5	6	7	8	9	10	11	12	13	14	15	16	17	18	19	20	21	22	DC	Points	Ref
2005–06	France	GBR; SPR	GBR; FEA	**GER**; **SPR**; 1	GER; FEA; 1	POR; SPR	POR; FEA	**AUS**; **SPR**; 1	AUS; FEA; 1	MYS; SPR	MYS; FEA	UAE; SPR; 7	UAE; FEA; 1	RSA; SPR	RSA; FEA	IDN; SPR; 1	IDN; FEA; 8	MEX; SPR	MEX; FEA	USA; SPR; 2	USA; FEA; Ret	CHN; SPR	CHN; FEA; 6	**1st**	**172**	
2006–07	France	NED; SPR; 3	NED; FEA; Ret	CZE; SPR; 3	CZE; FEA; Ret	CHN; SPR; 17	CHN; FEA; 4	MYS; SPR; 6	MYS; FEA; 3	IDN; SPR; 7	IDN; FEA; 3	NZL; SPR	NZL; FEA	AUS; SPR	AUS; FEA	RSA; SPR	RSA; FEA	MEX; SPR	MEX; FEA	CHN; SPR	CHN; FEA	GBR; SPR	GBR; SPR	4th	67	
2007–08	France	NED; SPR	NED; FEA	CZE; SPR; 6	CZE; FEA; 5	MYS; SPR	MYS; FEA	CHN; SPR	CHN; FEA	NZL; SPR	NZL; FEA	AUS; SPR	AUS; FEA	RSA; SPR	RSA; FEA	MEX; SPR	MEX; FEA	CHN; SPR	CHN; FEA	GBR; SPR	GBR; FEA			4th	118	

=== Complete 24 Hours of Le Mans results ===
Year	Team	Co-Drivers	Car	Class	Laps	Pos.	Class Pos.
2007	(France) Team Oreca	(Monaco) Stéphane Ortelli (France) Soheil Ayari	Saleen S7-R	GT1	318	16th	9th
2009	(France) Team Oreca-Matmut AIM	(France) Olivier Panis (France) Soheil Ayari	Oreca 01-AIM	LMP1	370	5th	5th
2010	(France) Team Oreca-Matmut	(France) Olivier Panis (France) Loïc Duval	Peugeot 908 HDi FAP	LMP1	373	DNF	DNF
2011	(France) Team Oreca-Matmut	(France) Olivier Panis (France) Loïc Duval	Peugeot 908 HDi FAP	LMP1	339	5th	5th
2012	(Japan) Toyota Racing	(Austria) Alexander Wurz (Japan) Kazuki Nakajima	Toyota TS030 Hybrid	LMP1	134	DNF	DNF
2013	(Japan) Toyota Racing	(Austria) Alexander Wurz (Japan) Kazuki Nakajima	Toyota TS030 Hybrid	LMP1	341	4th	4th
2014	(Japan) Toyota Racing	(United Kingdom) Anthony Davidson (Switzerland) Sébastien Buemi	Toyota TS040 Hybrid	LMP1-H	374	**3rd**	**3rd**
2015	(Hong Kong) KCMG	(United Kingdom) Matthew Howson (United Kingdom) Richard Bradley	Oreca 05-Nissan	LMP2	358	9th	**1st**
2016	(France) Signatech Alpine	(United States) Gustavo Menezes (Monaco) Stéphane Richelmi	Alpine A460-Nissan	LMP2	357	5th	**1st**
2017	(Japan) Toyota Gazoo Racing	(Argentina) José María López (Japan) Yuji Kunimoto	Toyota TS050 Hybrid	LMP1	160	DNF	DNF
2018	(France) Signatech Alpine Matmut	(Brazil) André Negrão (France) Pierre Thiriet	Alpine A470-Gibson	LMP2	367	5th	**1st**
2019	(France) Signatech Alpine Matmut	(Brazil) André Negrão (France) Pierre Thiriet	Alpine A470-Gibson	LMP2	368	6th	**1st**
2020	(Switzerland) Cool Racing	(Switzerland) Antonin Borga (Switzerland) Alexandre Coigny	Oreca 07-Gibson	LMP2	365	12th	8th
2021	(France) Alpine Elf Matmut	(Brazil) André Negrão (France) Matthieu Vaxivière	Alpine A480-Gibson	Hypercar	367	**3rd**	**3rd**
2022	(France) Alpine Elf Team	(Brazil) André Negrão (France) Matthieu Vaxivière	Alpine A480-Gibson	Hypercar	362	23rd	5th
2023	(Switzerland) Cool Racing	(Switzerland) Alexandre Coigny (Denmark) Malthe Jakobsen	Oreca 07-Gibson	LMP2	317	23rd	12th
2023	(Switzerland) Cool Racing	(Switzerland) Alexandre Coigny (Denmark) Malthe Jakobsen	Oreca 07-Gibson	LMP2 Pro-Am	317	23rd	**2nd**
2024	(France) Alpine Endurance Team	(Germany) Mick Schumacher (France) Matthieu Vaxivière	Alpine A424	Hypercar	88	DNF	DNF

=== Complete European Le Mans Series results ===
Year	Entrant	Class	Chassis	Engine	1	2	3	4	5	6	Rank	Points
2008	Team Oreca-Matmut	LMP1	Courage-Oreca LC70	Judd GV5.5 S2 5.5 L V10	CAT; Ret	MNZ; Ret	SPA; 3	NÜR; NC	SIL; 10		12th	6
2009	Team Oreca-Matmut AIM	LMP1	Courage-Oreca LC70E	AIM YS5.5 5.5 L V10	CAT; Ret						3rd	22
2009	Team Oreca-Matmut AIM	LMP1	Oreca 01	AIM YS5.5 5.5 L V10		SPA; 4	**ALG**; 4	NÜR	**SIL**; 1		3rd	22
2010	Team Oreca-Matmut	LMP1	Peugeot 908 HDi FAP	Peugeot 5.5L Turbo V12 (Diesel)	**CAS**; 4	SPA; Ret	**ALG**; 1	HUN; 4	SIL; 2		2nd	63
2011	Team Oreca-Matmut	LMP1	Peugeot 908 HDi FAP	Peugeot 5.5L Turbo V12 (Diesel)	LEC	SPA; 10	IMO	SIL	EST		NC	0
2015	Thiriet by TDS Racing	LMP2	Oreca 05	Nissan VK45DE 4.5 L V8	SIL	IMO	RBR	LEC	EST; 1		11th	25
2016	DragonSpeed	LMP2	Oreca 05	Nissan VK45DE 4.5 L V8	SIL; Ret	**IMO**; 3	RBR; Ret	LEC; 3	**SPA**; 1	**EST**; 2	4th	76
2017	DragonSpeed	LMP2	Oreca 07	Gibson GK428 4.2 L V8	**SIL**; 10	MNZ; 2	RBR; Ret	**LEC**; 7	**SPA**; 5	ALG; 9	11th	40
2018	DragonSpeed	LMP2	Oreca 07	Gibson GK428 4.2 L V8	LEC; Ret	**MNZ**; 4	RBR; 5	SIL; 2	SPA; 2‡	ALG; 13	7th	50.5
2019	Cool Racing	LMP2	Oreca 07	Gibson GK428 4.2 L V8	LEC; 7	**MNZ**; 8	CAT; 3	SIL; Ret	SPA; 2	ALG; 14	10th	44.5
2020	Cool Racing	LMP2	Oreca 07	Gibson GK428 4.2 L V8	LEC; 4	SPA; 10	LEC; 12	MNZ; 4	ALG; 9		8th	28.5
2021	Cool Racing	LMP2	Oreca 07	Gibson GK428 4.2 L V8	CAT; 10	RBR; 10	LEC; 12	MNZ; 12	**SPA**; 4	**ALG**; 6	15th	25
2021	Cool Racing	Pro-Am Cup	Oreca 07	Gibson GK428 4.2 L V8	3	4	3	4	1	1	2nd	106
2022	Cool Racing	LMP2	Oreca 07	Gibson GK428 4.2 L V8	LEC; 5	IMO; 3	MNZ; 8	CAT; 3	**SPA**; 5	ALG; 3	5th	70
2023	Cool Racing	LMP2 Pro-Am	Oreca 07	Gibson GK428 4.2 L V8	CAT; 3	LEC; 2	ARA; Ret	SPA; 1	ALG; 1	ALG; 2	2nd	101

^{‡} Half points awarded as less than 75% of race distance was completed.

=== Complete FIA World Endurance Championship results ===
Year	Entrant	Class	Chassis	Engine	1	2	3	4	5	6	7	8	9	Rank	Points
2012	Toyota Racing	LMP1	Toyota TS030 Hybrid	Toyota 3.4 L V8 (Hybrid)	SEB	SPA	LMS; Ret	SIL; 2	**SÃO**; 1	BHR; Ret	**FUJ**; 1	**SHA**; 1		3rd	96
2013	Toyota Racing	LMP1	Toyota TS030 Hybrid	Toyota 3.4 L V8 (Hybrid)	**SIL**; 4	SPA; Ret	LMS; 4	SÃO	COA	FUJ; 1	**SHA**; 2	**BHR**; Ret		4th	69.5
2014	Toyota Racing	LMP1	Toyota TS040 Hybrid	Toyota 3.7 L V8 (Hybrid)	SIL; 1	SPA; 1	LMS; 3	**COA**; 3	FUJ	SHA	BHR	SÃO		6th	96
2015	KCMG	LMP2	Oreca 05	Nissan VK45DE 4.5 L V8	SIL	SPA; 3	**LMS**; 1	NÜR	COA; 2	FUJ	SHA	BHR		5th	84
2016	Signatech-Alpine	LMP2	Alpine A460	Nissan VK45DE 4.5 L V8	SIL; 4	SPA; 1	LMS; 1	NÜR; 1	MEX; 2	**COA**; 1	FUJ; 3	SHA; 4	**BHR**; 3	1st	199
2017	Signatech Alpine Matmut	LMP2	Alpine A470	Gibson GK428 4.2 L V8	SIL; 4			NÜR; 3	**MEX**; 2	**COA**; 1	FUJ; 2	SHA; 2	**BHR**; 4	6th	121
2017	Toyota Gazoo Racing	LMP1	Toyota TS050 Hybrid	Toyota 2.4 L Turbo V6		SPA; 5	LMS; Ret							12th	60
2018–19	Signatech Alpine Matmut	LMP2	Alpine A470	Gibson GK428 4.2 L V8	**SPA**; 2	LMS; 1	SIL; 3	FUJ; 3	SHA; 3	SEB; 2	SPA; 2	LMS; 1		1st	181
2019–20	Cool Racing	LMP2	Oreca 07	Gibson GK428 4.2 L V8	SIL; 1	FUJ; 5	**SHA**; Ret	BHR; 6	**COA**; 4	SPA; 2	LMS; 4	BHR		9th	103
2021	Alpine Elf Matmut	Hypercar	Alpine A480	Gibson GL458 4.5 L V8	SPA; 2	**ALG**; 3	MNZ; 2	LMS; 3	BHR; 3	BHR; 3				3rd	128
2022	Alpine Elf Team	Hypercar	Alpine A480	Gibson GL458 4.5 L V8	**SEB**; 1	SPA; 2	LMS; 4	MNZ; 1	FUJ; 3	BHR; 3				2nd	144
2024	Alpine Endurance Team	Hypercar	Alpine A424	Alpine 3.4 L Turbo V6	QAT; 11	IMO; 16	SPA; 12	LMS; Ret	SÃO; 10	COA; 9	FUJ; 3	BHR		23rd	18

=== Complete World Touring Car Championship results ===
(key) (Races in bold indicate pole position) (Races in italics indicate fastest lap)

Year	Team	Car	1	2	3	4	5	6	7	8	9	10	11	12	13	14	15	16	17	18	19	20	21	22	23	24	DC	Points
2015	Lada Sport Rosneft	Lada Vesta WTCC	ARG; 1	ARG; 2	MAR; 1	MAR; 2	HUN; 1	HUN; 2	GER; 1	GER; 2	RUS; 1	RUS; 2	SVK; 1	SVK; 2	FRA; 1	FRA; 2	POR; 1	POR; 2	JPN; 1; 11	JPN; 2; 8	CHN; 1 DSQ	CHN; 2; 9	THA; 1 Ret	THA; 2 DNS	QAT; 1; 10	QAT; 2; 10	16th	8

=== Complete IMSA SportsCar Championship results ===
(key) (Races in bold indicate pole position; races in italics indicate fastest lap)

Year	Entrant	Class	Make	Engine	1	2	3	4	5	6	7	8	9	10	Rank	Points	Ref
2016	DragonSpeed	P	Oreca 05	Nissan VK45DE 4.5 L V8	DAY	SEB; 4	LBH	LGA	DET	WGL	MOS	ELK	COA	PET	26th	29	
2017	DragonSpeed	P	Oreca 07	Gibson GK428 4.2 L V8	DAY; 10	SEB	LBH	COA	DET	WGL	MOS	ROA	LAG	PET	39th	21	
2018	Tequila Patrón ESM	P	Nissan Onroak DPi	Nissan VR38DETT 3.8 L Turbo V6	DAY; 18	SEB; 1	LBH	MDO	DET	WGL; 16	MOS	ELK	LGA	PET	32nd	63	
2019	DragonSpeed	LMP2	Oreca 07	Gibson GK428 4.2 L V8	**DAY**; 3	SEB	MDO	WGL	MOS	ELK	LGA	PET			13th	30	
2020	Tower Motorsport by Starworks	LMP2	Oreca 07	Gibson GK428 4.2 L V8	DAY; 4†	SEB	ELK	ATL	PET	LGA	SEB				NC†	0†	
2021	PR1/Mathiasen Motorsports	LMP2	Oreca 07	Gibson GK428 4.2 L V8	**DAY**; 7†	SEB	WGL	WGL	ELK	LGA	PET				NC†	0†	
2022	PR1/Mathiasen Motorsports	LMP2	Oreca 07	Gibson GK428 4.2 L V8	**DAY**; 4†	SEB	LGA	MDO	WGL	ELK	PET				NC†	0†	
2023	PR1/Mathiasen Motorsports	LMP2	Oreca 07	Gibson GK428 4.2 L V8	**DAY**; 7†	SEB	LGA	WGL	ELK	IMS	PET				NC†	0†	

^{†} Points only counted towards the Michelin Endurance Cup, and not the overall LMP2 Championship.

Sporting positions
Preceded by Tristan Gommendy	Macau Grand Prix; Winner; 2003	Succeeded by Alexandre Prémat
Preceded by Inaugural	A1 Grand Prix; Champion (Team France); 2005-06; With: Alexandre Prémat	Succeeded by Nico Hülkenberg; Christian Vietoris (Team Germany)
Preceded by Sam Bird; Julien Canal; Roman Rusinov	FIA Endurance Trophy for LMP2 Drivers; 2016; With: Stephane Richelmi & Gustavo Menezes	Succeeded by Bruno Senna; Julien Canal
Preceded by Bruno Senna; Julien Canal	FIA Endurance Trophy for LMP2 Drivers; 2018-19; With: André Negrão & Pierre Thiriet	Succeeded by Filipe Albuquerque; Phil Hanson
