= Alexandre Prémat =

French racing driver (born 1982)

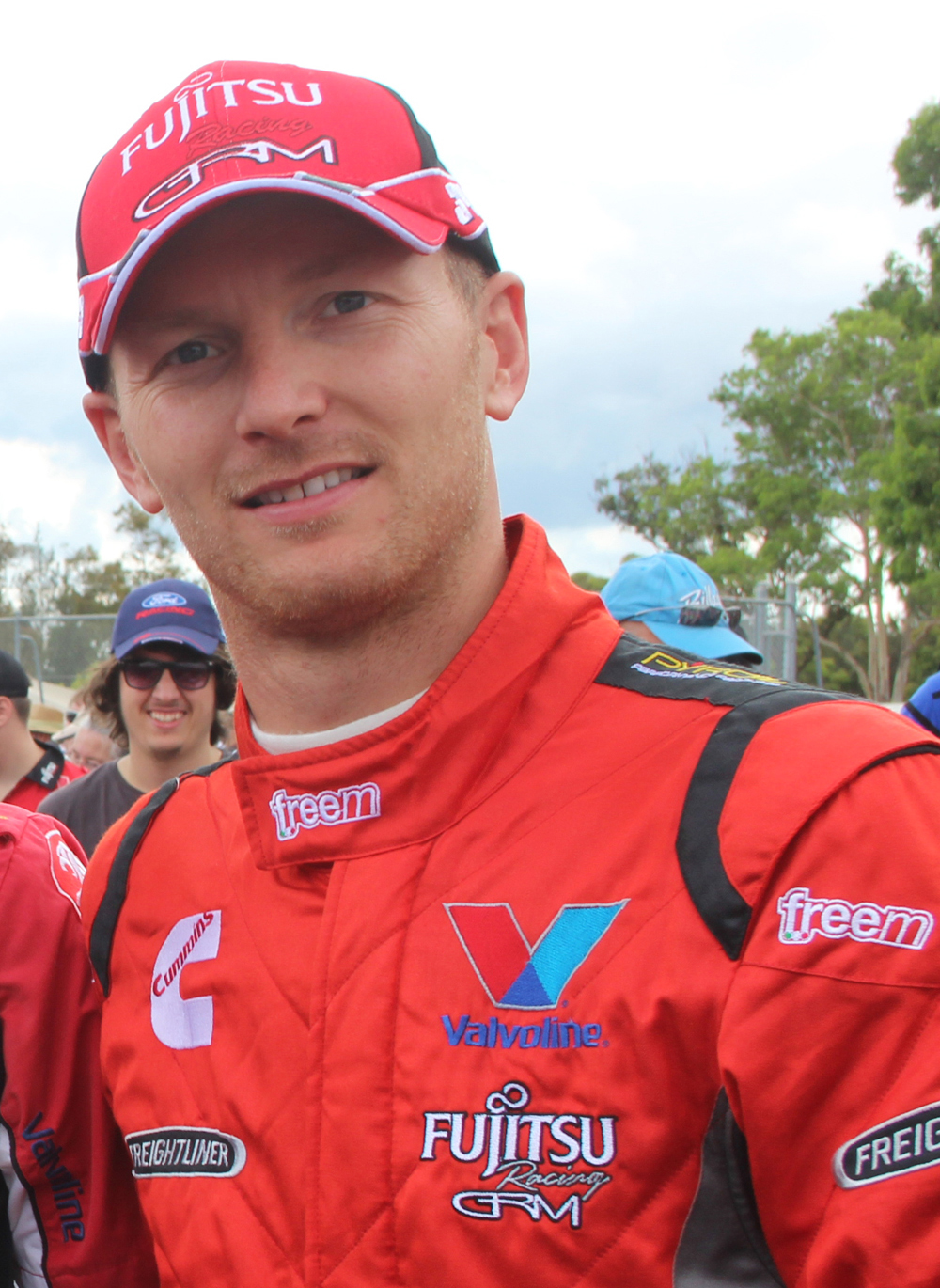
- Prémat in 2013
- Nationality: French
- Born: 5 November 1982 (age 44) Juvisy-sur-Orge, France
- Categorisation: FIA Platinum (until 2017); FIA Gold (2018–)

Supercars Championship career
- Current team: Tickford Racing (Endurance race co-driver)
- Championships: 0
- Races: 85
- Wins: 3
- Podiums: 10
- Pole positions: 4
- 2019 position: 30th

24 Hours of Le Mans career
- Years: 2007–2009, 2011
- Teams: Audi Sport Team Joest
- Best finish: 4th (2008)
- Class wins: 0

Alexandre Prémat (born 5 November 1982) is a French racing driver. He won the Pirtek Enduro Cup for Triple Eight Race Engineering alongside Shane van Gisbergen in 2016. He also won the 2019 Supercheap Auto Bathurst 1000 with Scott McLaughlin, driving for DJR Team Penske.

== Career ==
=== Karting & French Formula Renault Campus ===
In 1999, Prémat won the Coupe du Monde de Karting 125cc ICC. That same year, he finished as vice-champion in the Formule France de Karting ICC, clinching six victories. His success continued in 2000, when Prémat captured the Champion de France FC 125cc title.

Prémat continued karting until 2000, when he moved up to French Formula Campus. He finished the season in second place, securing two victories.

=== Formula Renault ===
Prémat quickly moved up to French Formula Renault for the 2001 season, with his teammate being Simon Pagenaud. In his first season, Prémat finished ninth in the points standings. The following year, in 2002, he won the Formula Renault French title. Also during this year, he raced in part of the Formula Renault 2000 Eurocup.

=== Formula Three ===
With the merger of several national Formula Three championships in 2003, Prémat moved to the Formula 3 Euroseries, joining the ASM team alongside Olivier Pla. That season, he finished the year seventh in the points standings. In 2004, Prémat finished second in the points standings with six wins. He also won in the Marlboro Masters non-championship races and Macau Grand Prix.

=== GP2 Series ===
In 2005, Prémat joined ART Grand Prix to compete in the 2005 GP2 Series, the sister team to his former Formula 3 squad, ASM. Despite two wins that season, Prémat finished fourth in the championship, with his teammate Nico Rosberg claiming the title. The following year, Prémat finished third in the standings despite winning one race. Meanwhile, his new teammate, Lewis Hamilton, went on to dominate the season and win the championship.

=== A1 Grand Prix ===
Prémat also drove the A1 Team France car in A1 Grand Prix in the 2005–06 season, he and team-mate Nicolas Lapierre winning the title for their nation. Prémat did not return to the series for the following season, and the French team's form dropped noticeably.

=== Formula One ===
Prémat drove the third Spyker MF1 Racing car at the 2006 Chinese Grand Prix. He also had an off-season test with Champ Car team Mi-Jack Conquest Racing. Prémat had the quickest time in several sessions and stated that he was targeting a ride in Champ Car for 2007. Another possibility was to drive in Formula One with Spyker, as one of their test drivers, but it did not work out.

=== Deutsche Tourenwagen Masters and Le Mans Series ===
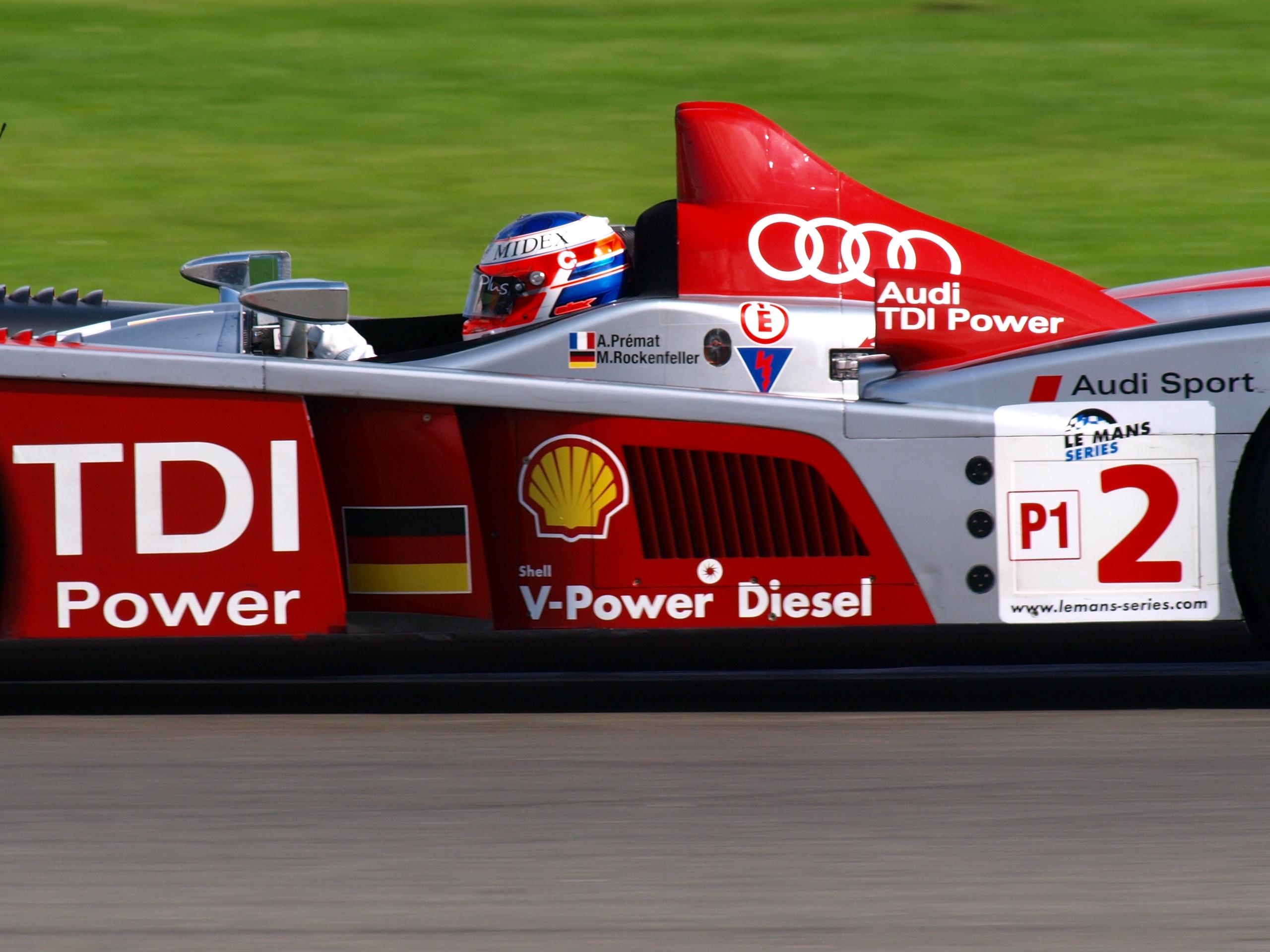
Prémat in the cockpit of an Audi R10 TDI

Eventually, Prémat drove for Audi in the 2007 DTM series and participated in the 24 Hours of Le Mans, also with Audi. In 2008, Prémat again raced in DTM, and also the Le Mans Series with Audi. In 2009, he remained in this series and also participated in 24 Hours of Le Mans. He was fired by Audi before the final race of the 2010 season for running in the New York Marathon instead of recovering from a heavy crash at the previous round. In 2011, he won his class of the Nürburgring 24 Hour race in a Peugeot RCZ.

=== Supercars Championship ===
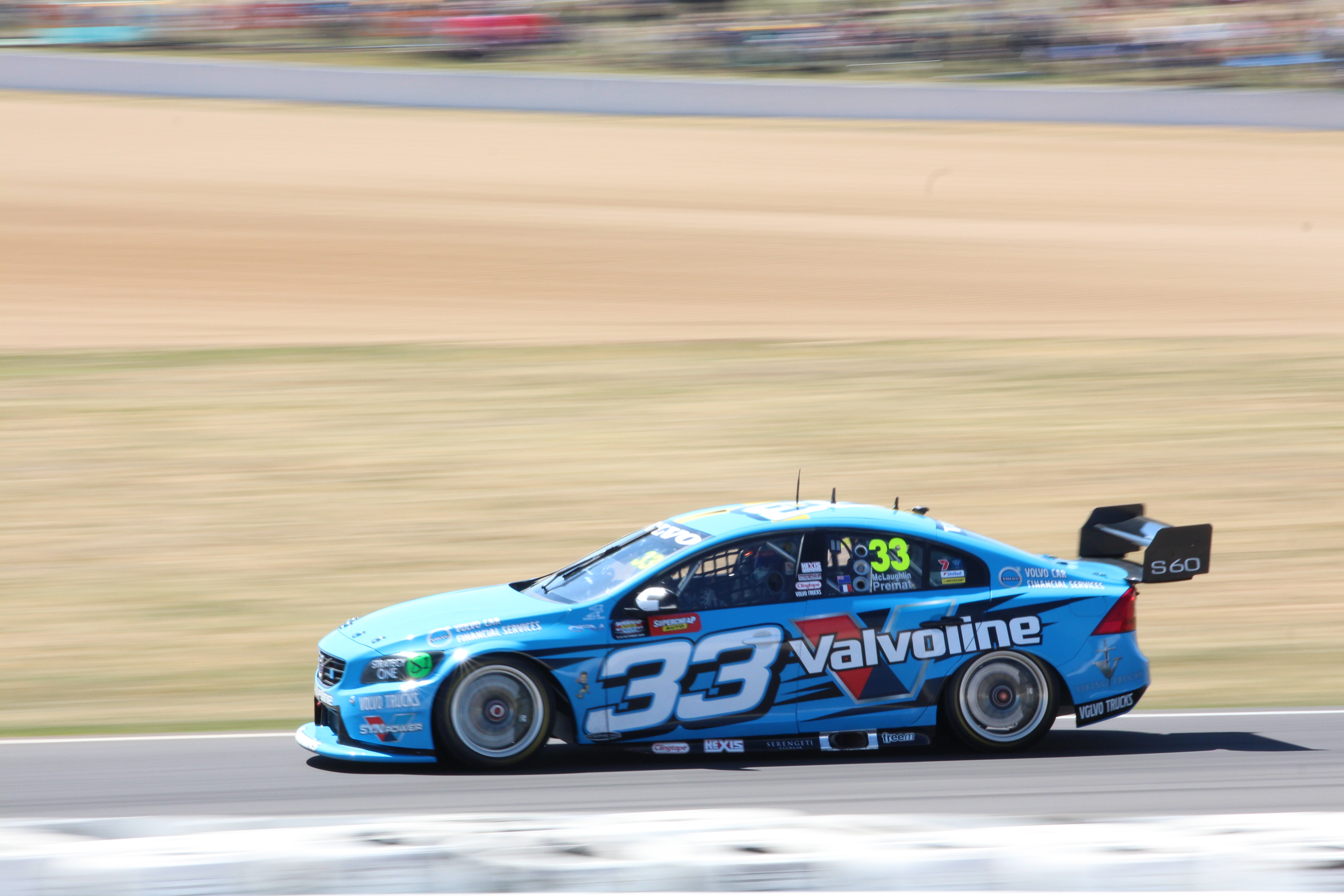
Prémat driving for Garry Rogers Motorsport at the 2014 Bathurst 1000

In 2012, Prémat joined the Australia's leading touring car series, then known as V8 Supercars, driving a Holden VE Commodore for Garry Rogers Motorsport. After a disappointing first half of the season, where he struggled to adapt to the championship, he was rested for the 2012 Armor All Gold Coast 600, with Greg Ritter taking his place. He returned to racing at the following round in Abu Dhabi, and went on to finish the season with a best result of thirteenth place at Symmons Plains Raceway. Prémat remained with the team in 2013, starting the season with fourth place in the 2013 Clipsal 500 Adelaide. Despite showing front-running pace, particularly at the start of the season, he failed to achieve consistent results due to poor qualifying and incidents during the races.

In January 2014, Prémat announced he was leaving the team in a full-time capacity, however he would return to the team, which were now competing in a Volvo S60, for the endurance events, placing fifth in the Enduro Cup with full-time driver Scott McLaughlin. Prémat once again joined McLaughlin in the 2015 Enduro Cup, with a best result of fifth at the 2015 Supercheap Auto Bathurst 1000.

For 2016, Triple Eight Race Engineering poached Prémat to partner with Shane van Gisbergen in the Enduro Cup. The pairing went on to win the 2016 Enduro Cup, including three second-place finishes and Prémat's first race victory in the championship at the 2016 Castrol Gold Coast 600.

== Racing record ==
=== Career summary ===
Season	Series	Team	Races	Wins	Poles	F/laps	Podiums	Points	Position
2000	Formula Renault Campus France	Formula Campus	16	2	2	8	9	396	**2nd**
2001	Championnat de France Formule Renault 2000	ASM	8	0	2	4	3	58	9th
2002	Championnat de France FFSA de Formule Renault	ASM	8	3	2	1	4	120	**1st**
2002	Formula Renault 2000 Eurocup	ASM	4	0	0	0	1	36	10th
2003	Formula Three Euroseries	ASM	20	1	2	2	3	50	7th
2003	Masters of Formula 3	ASM	1	0	0	0	0	N/A	9th
2004	Formula 3 Euroseries	ASM Formule 3	20	4	5	3	9	88	**2nd**
2004	Bahrain Superprix	ASM Formule 3	1	0	0	0	0	N/A	9th
2004	Macau Grand Prix	ASM Formule 3	1	1	0	1	1	N/A	**1st**
2004	Masters of Formula 3	ASM Formule 3	1	1	1	0	1	N/A	**1st**
2005	GP2 Series	ART Grand Prix	23	2	1	2	7	67	4th
2005–06	A1 Grand Prix	A1 Team France	11	7	2	5	8	172	**1st**
2006	GP2 Series	ART Grand Prix	21	1	0	1	8	66	**3rd**
2006	Formula One	Spyker MF1 Racing	Test driver						
2007	Deutsche Tourenwagen Masters	Audi Sport Team Phoenix	9	0	0	2	1	13	11th
2007	24 Hours of Le Mans - LMP1	Audi Sport Team Joest	1	0	0	0	0	N/A	DNF
2008	Deutsche Tourenwagen Masters	Audi Sport Team Phoenix	11	0	0	0	2	10	10th
2008	Le Mans Series - LMP1	Audi Sport Team Joest	5	0	0	2	4	35	**1st**
2008	24 Hours of Le Mans - LMP1	Audi Sport Team Joest	1	0	0	0	0	N/A	4th
2009	Deutsche Tourenwagen Masters	Audi Sport Team Phoenix	10	0	0	1	1	6	13th
2009	24 Hours of Le Mans - LMP1	Audi Sport Team Joest	1	0	0	0	0	N/A	17th
2010	Deutsche Tourenwagen Masters	Audi Sport Team Phoenix	10	0	1	0	1	12	11th
2011	Intercontinental Le Mans Cup - LMP1	OAK Racing	3	0	0	0	1	N/A	6th
2011	24 Hours of Le Mans - LMP2	Team Oreca-Matmut	1	0	0	1	0	N/A	DNF
2011	24 Hours of Nürburgring - D1T	Team Peugeot RCZ Nokia	1	1	0	1	1	N/A	**1st**
2012	International V8 Supercars Championship	Garry Rogers Motorsport	27	0	0	0	0	942	27th
2013	International V8 Supercars Championship	Garry Rogers Motorsport	35	0	0	0	0	1376	19th
2014	International V8 Supercars Championship	Garry Rogers Motorsport	4	0	0	0	1	522	30th
2014	Blancpain Endurance Series - Pro	ART Grand Prix	3	1	0	0	1	31	13th
2015	International V8 Supercars Championship	Garry Rogers Motorsport	4	0	0	0	0	492	35th
2016	International V8 Supercars Championship	Triple Eight Race Engineering	4	1	0	0	4	840	26th
2016	IMSA SportsCar Championship - GTLM	Scuderia Corsa	1	0	0	0	0	29	24th
2016	24H Series - 991	B2F Compétition							
2017	Supercars Championship	DJR Team Penske	4	1	1	0	2	495	34th
2018	Supercars Championship	DJR Team Penske	3	0	1	0	1	609	28th
2018	Continental Tire SportsCar Challenge - GS	Quest Racing	8	0	1	0	0	108	26th
2019	Supercars Championship	DJR Team Penske	4	1	2	0	2	603	30th
2019	Michelin Pilot Challenge - GS	Ramsey Racing/EXR Team Prémat	1	0	0	0	0	10	77th
2019	GT4 America Series - SprintX Pro-Am	Ramsey Racing/EXR Team Prémat	4	0	0	0	1	50	8th
2020	Michelin Pilot Challenge - TCR	Team Prémat	1	0	0	0	0	17	32nd
2022	Michelin Pilot Challenge - GS	RS1	3	0	1	0	1	620	39th
2022	GT4 America Series - Pro-Am	GMG Racing	2	0	0	0	0	8	26th
2023	Lamborghini Super Trofeo North America - Pro-Am	Forte Racing powered by US RaceTronics	10	0	1	2	2	58	10th
2024	Michelin Pilot Challenge - GS	Van der Steur Racing	2	0	0	0	0	420	39th
2024	Lamborghini Super Trofeo North America - Pro-Am	Forte Racing	4	0	0	0	0	12	14th

=== Complete Formula Renault 2.0 Eurocup results ===
(key) (Races in bold indicate pole position) (Races in italics indicate fastest lap)

Year	Entrant	1	2	3	4	5	6	7	8	9	DC	Points
2002	ASM	MAG; 3	SIL; Ret	JAR; 4	AND	OSC	SPA; Ret	IMO	DON	EST	10th	36

=== Complete Formula 3 Euro Series results ===
(key)

Year	Entrant	Chassis	Engine	1	2	3	4	5	6	7	8	9	10	11	12	13	14	15	16	17	18	19	20	DC	Pts
2003	ASM	Dallara F303/015	HWA-Mercedes	HOC; 1 DSQ	HOC; 2; 24	ADR; 1; 7	ADR; 2; 5	PAU; 1; 22	PAU; 2 Ret	**NOR**; **1** Ret	**NOR**; **2**; 1	LMS; 1; 5	LMS; 2; 23	NÜR; 1; 5	NÜR; 2; 11	A1R; 1; 2	A1R; 2; 2	ZAN; 1 Ret	ZAN; 2; 5	HOC; 1; 9	HOC; 2 Ret	MAG; 1 Ret	MAG; 2; 5	7th	50
2004	ASM	Dallara F303/015	HWA-Mercedes	**HOC**; **1**; 2	HOC; 2; 3	**EST**; **1**; 1	EST; 2; 8	ADR; 1; 8	ADR; 1 Ret	PAU; 1 DSQ	**PAU**; **2** DSQ	NOR; 1; 18	NOR; 1 Ret	MAG; 1; 1	MAG; 2 Ret	NÜR; 1; 6	NÜR; 2; 5	ZAN; 1; 5	ZAN; 2; 3	**BRN**; **1**; 2	**BRN**; **2**; 2	HOC; 1; 18	HOC; 2; 4	**2nd**	**88**

=== Complete GP2 Series results ===
(key) (Races in bold indicate pole position) (Races in italics indicate fastest lap)

Year	Entrant	1	2	3	4	5	6	7	8	9	10	11	12	13	14	15	16	17	18	19	20	21	22	23	DC	Points
2005	ART Grand Prix	IMO; FEA; 7	IMO; SPR; 2	CAT; FEA; 10	CAT; SPR; Ret	MON; FEA; Ret	NÜR; FEA; 4	NÜR; SPR; Ret	**MAG**; **FEA**; 9	MAG; SPR; Ret	SIL; FEA; 3	SIL; SPR; 5	HOC; FEA; 2	HOC; SPR; 9	HUN; FEA; 4	HUN; SPR; 1	IST; FEA; 1	IST; SPR; 14	MNZ; FEA; Ret	MNZ; SPR; 18	SPA; FEA; Ret	SPA; SPR; 12	BHR; FEA; 2	BHR; SPR; 3	4th	67
2006	ART Grand Prix	VAL; FEA; 9	VAL; SPR; Ret	IMO; FEA; 4	IMO; SPR; Ret	NÜR; FEA; 2	NÜR; SPR; 17	CAT; FEA; 1	CAT; SPR; 3	MON; FEA; 3	SIL; FEA; 6	SIL; SPR; Ret	MAG; FEA; 2	MAG; SPR; 3	HOC; FEA; 19	HOC; SPR; Ret	HUN; FEA; 6	HUN; SPR; 3	IST; FEA; 3	IST; SPR; 7	MNZ; FEA; 5	MNZ; SPR; Ret			**3rd**	**66**

=== Complete A1 Grand Prix results ===
(key) (Races in bold indicate pole position) (Races in italics indicate fastest lap)

Year	Entrant	1	2	3	4	5	6	7	8	9	10	11	12	13	14	15	16	17	18	19	20	21	22	DC	Points
2005–06	France	GBR; SPR; 2	GBR; FEA; DNS	GER; SPR	GER; FEA	POR; SPR; 1	POR; FEA; 1	AUS; SPR	AUS; FEA	MYS; SPR; 1	MYS; FEA; 1	UAE; SPR	UAE; FEA	**RSA**; **SPR**; 1	RSA; FEA; 8	IDN; SPR	IDN; FEA	**MEX**; **SPR**; 1	MEX; FEA; 1	USA; SPR	USA; FEA	CHN; SPR; 7	CHN; FEA	**1st**	**172**

=== Complete Formula One participations ===
(key)

Year	Entrant	Chassis	Engine	1	2	3	4	5	6	7	8	9	10	11	12	13	14	15	16	17	18	WDC	Points
2006	Spyker MF1 Racing	Spyker M16	Toyota V8	BHR	MAL	AUS	SMR	EUR	ESP	MON	GBR	CAN	USA	FRA	GER	HUN	TUR	ITA	CHN; TD	JPN	BRA	–	–

=== Complete Deutsche Tourenwagen Masters results ===
(key)

Year	Team	Car	1	2	3	4	5	6	7	8	9	10	11	Pos.	Pts
2007	Team Phoenix	Audi A4 DTM 2006	HOC; Ret	OSC	LAU; Ret	BRH; 7	NOR; 8	MUG; 7	ZAN; 2	NÜR; 9	CAT; 10	HOC; 16		11th	13
2008	Team Phoenix	Audi A4 DTM 2007	HOC; 11	OSC; 9	MUG; 8	LAU; DSQ	NOR; 14	ZAN; Ret	NÜR; 14	BRH; 10	CAT; 6	BUG; 3	HOC; 13	10th	10
2009	Team Phoenix	Audi A4 DTM 2008	HOC; Ret	LAU; Ret	NOR; Ret	ZAN; DSQ	OSC; Ret	NÜR; Ret	BRH; 11	CAT; 8	DIJ; 11	HOC; 4		13th	6
2010	Team Phoenix	Audi A4 DTM 2008	HOC; 10	VAL; 3	LAU; Ret	NOR; 7	NÜR; Ret	ZAN; 11	BRH; 8	OSC; 6	HOC; Ret	ADR; Ret	SHA	11th	12

=== Complete Le Mans Series results ===
Year	Entrant	Class	Chassis	Engine	1	2	3	4	5	Rank	Points
2008	Audi Sport Team Joest	LMP1	Audi R10	Audi TDI 5.5 L Turbo V12 (Diesel)	CAT; 2	MON; 2	SPA; 2	NÜR; 3	SIL; 4	1st	27

=== 24 Hours of Le Mans results ===
Year	Team	Co-drivers	Car	Class	Laps	Pos.	Class pos.
2007	(Germany) Audi Sport Team Joest	(Germany) Mike Rockenfeller (Germany) Lucas Luhr	Audi R10 TDI	LMP1	23	DNF	DNF
2008	(Germany) Audi Sport Team Joest	(Germany) Mike Rockenfeller (Germany) Lucas Luhr	Audi R10 TDI	LMP1	374	4th	4th
2009	(Germany) Audi Sport Team Joest	(Germany) Timo Bernhard (France) Romain Dumas	Audi R15 TDI	LMP1	333	17th	13th
2011	(France) Team Oreca-Matmut	(France) David Hallyday (Austria) Dominik Kraihamer	Oreca 03-Nissan	LMP2	200	DNF	DNF

=== Supercars Championship results ===
Supercars results
Year	Team	No.	Car	1	2	3	4	5	6	7	8	9	10	11	12	13	14	15	16	17	18	19	20	21	22	23	24	25	26	27	28	29	30	31	32	33	34	35	36	37	38	39	Position	Points
2012	Garry Rogers Motorsport	33	Holden VE Commodore	ADE; R1; 17	ADE; R2; 18	SYM; R3; 17	SYM; R4; 13	HAM; R5; Ret	HAM; R6; 24	BAR; R7; 17	BAR; R8; 28	BAR; R9; 24	PHI; R10; Ret	PHI; R11; 22	HID; R12; 22	HID; R13; 20	TOW; R14; Ret	TOW; R15; 16	QLD; R16; 19	QLD; R17; 23	SMP; R18; 28	SMP; R19; 27	SAN; Q 23	SAN; R20; 19	BAT; R21; 16	SUR; R22	SUR; R23	YMC; R24; 20	YMC; R25; 25	YMC; R26; 14	WIN; R27; 18	WIN; R28; 21	SYD; R29; Ret	SYD; R30; DNS									27th	942
2013	Garry Rogers Motorsport	34	Holden VF Commodore	ADE; R1; 4	ADE; R2; Ret	SYM; R3; 21	SYM; R4; 21	SYM; R5; 14	PUK; R6; Ret	PUK; R7; 8	PUK; R8; 21	PUK; R9; 12	BAR; R10; 6	BAR; R11; 19	BAR; R12; 11	COA; R13; 17	COA; R14; 12	COA; R15; 28	COA; R16; 11	HID; R17; 21	HID; R18; 15	HID; R19; Ret	TOW; R20; 13	TOW; R21; 19	QLD; R22; 20	QLD; R23; 14	QLD; R24; 26	WIN; R25; 17	WIN; R26; Ret	WIN; R27; 11	SAN; Q 10	SAN; R28; 10	BAT; R29; 23	SUR; R30; 14	SUR; R31; 14	PHI; R32; Ret	PHI; R33; DNS	PHI; R34; DNS	SYD; R35; 13	SYD; R36; 16			19th	1376
2014	Garry Rogers Motorsport	33	Volvo S60	ADE; R1	ADE; R2	ADE; R3	SYM; R4	SYM; R5	SYM; R6	WIN; R7	WIN; R8	WIN; R9	PUK; R10	PUK; R11	PUK; R12	PUK; R13	BAR; R14	BAR; R15	BAR; R16	HID; R17	HID; R18	HID; R19	TOW; R20	TOW; R21	TOW; R22	QLD; R23	QLD; R24	QLD; R25	SMP; R26	SMP; R27	SMP; R28	SAN; Q 12	SAN; R29; 8	BAT; R30; 17	SUR; R31; 7	SUR; R32; 2	PHI; R33	PHI; R34	PHI; R35	SYD; R36	SYD; R37	SYD; R38	30th	522
2015	Garry Rogers Motorsport	33	Volvo S60	ADE; R1	ADE; R2	ADE; R3	SYM; R4	SYM; R5	SYM; R6	BAR; R7	BAR; R8	BAR; R9	WIN; R10	WIN; R11	WIN; R12	HID; R13	HID; R14	HID; R15	TOW; R16	TOW; R17	QLD; R18	QLD; R19	QLD; R20	SMP; R21	SMP; R22	SMP; R23	SAN; Q 22	SAN; R24; 14	BAT; R25; 5	SUR; R26; 21	SUR; R27; 6	PUK; R28	PUK; R29	PUK; R30	PHI; R31	PHI; R32	PHI; R33	SYD; R34	SYD; R35	SYD; R36			35th	492
2016	Triple Eight Race Engineering	97	Holden VF Commodore	ADE; R1	ADE; R2	ADE; R3	SYM; R4	SYM; R5	PHI; R6	PHI; R7	BAR; R8	BAR; R9	WIN; R10	WIN; R11	HID; R12	HID; R13	TOW; R14	TOW; R15	QLD; R16	QLD; R17	SMP; R18	SMP; R19	SAN; Q 8	SAN; R20; 2	BAT; R21; 2	SUR; R22; 1	SUR; R23; 2	PUK; R24	PUK; R25	PUK; R26	PUK; R27	SYD; R28	SYD; R29										26th	840
2017	DJR Team Penske	17	Ford FG X Falcon	ADE; R1	ADE; R2	SYM; R3	SYM; R4	PHI; R5	PHI; R6	BAR; R7	BAR; R8	WIN; R9	WIN; R10	HID; R11	HID; R12	TOW; R13	TOW; R14	QLD; R15	QLD; R16	SMP; R17	SMP; R18	SAN; QR; 2	SAN; R19; 2	BAT; R20; Ret	SUR; R21; 12	SUR; R22; 1	PUK; R23	PUK; R24	NEW; R25	NEW; R26													34th	495
2018	DJR Team Penske	17	Ford FG X Falcon	ADE; R1	ADE; R2	MEL; R3	MEL; R4	MEL; R5	MEL; R6	SYM; R7	SYM; R8	PHI; R9	PHI; R10	BAR; R11	BAR; R12	WIN; R13	WIN; R14	HID; R15	HID; R16	TOW; R17	TOW; R18	QLD; R19	QLD; R20	SMP; R21	BEN; R22	BEN; R23	SAN; QR; 3	SAN; R24; 4	BAT; R25; 3	SUR; R26; 5	SUR; R27; C	PUK; R28	PUK; R29	NEW; R30	NEW; R31								28th	609
2019	DJR Team Penske	17	Ford Mustang S550	ADE; R1	ADE; R2	MEL; R3	MEL; R4	MEL; R5	MEL; R6	SYM; R7	SYM; R8	PHI; R9	PHI; R10	BAR; R11	BAR; R12	WIN; R13	WIN; R14	HID; R15	HID; R16	TOW; R17	TOW; R18	QLD; R19	QLD; R20	BEN; R21	BEN; R22	PUK; R23	PUK; R24	BAT; R25; 1	SUR; R26; 3	SUR; R27; DNS	SAN; QR; **6**	SAN; R28; 9	NEW; R29	NEW; R30									30th	603

=== Complete Bathurst 1000 results ===
Year	Team	Car	Co-driver	Position	Laps
2012	Garry Rogers Motorsport	Holden Commodore VE	(Australia) Jack Perkins	16th	161
2013	Garry Rogers Motorsport	Holden Commodore VF	(Australia) Greg Ritter	23rd	154
2014	Garry Rogers Motorsport	Volvo S60	(New Zealand) Scott McLaughlin	17th	150
2015	Garry Rogers Motorsport	Volvo S60	(New Zealand) Scott McLaughlin	5th	161
2016	Triple Eight Race Engineering	Holden Commodore VF	(New Zealand) Shane van Gisbergen	**2nd**	161
2017	DJR Team Penske	Ford Falcon FG X	(New Zealand) Scott McLaughlin	DNF	74
2018	DJR Team Penske	Ford Falcon FG X	(New Zealand) Scott McLaughlin	**3rd**	161
2019	DJR Team Penske	Ford Mustang GT	(New Zealand) Scott McLaughlin	**1st**	161

Sporting positions
Preceded by Eric Salignon	French Formula Renault 2.0; Champion; 2002	Succeeded by Loïc Duval
Preceded by Christian Klien	Formula Three Masters; Winner; 2004	Succeeded by Lewis Hamilton
Preceded by Nicolas Lapierre	Macau Grand Prix; Winner; 2004	Succeeded by Lucas di Grassi
Preceded by None	A1 Grand Prix Champion; 2005–06; With Nicolas Lapierre (Team France)	Succeeded by Nico Hülkenberg; Christian Vietoris (Team Germany)
Preceded by Stéphane Sarrazin; Pedro Lamy	Le Mans Series Champion; 2008; With Mike Rockenfeller	Succeeded by Tomáš Enge; Jan Charouz; Stefan Mücke
Preceded by Garth Tander; Warren Luff	Winner of the Pirtek Enduro Cup; 2016 (with Shane van Gisbergen)	Succeeded by Chaz Mostert; Steve Owen
Preceded by Craig Lowndes; Steven Richards	Winner of the Bathurst 1000; 2019 (with Scott McLaughlin)	Succeeded by Shane van Gisbergen; Garth Tander
