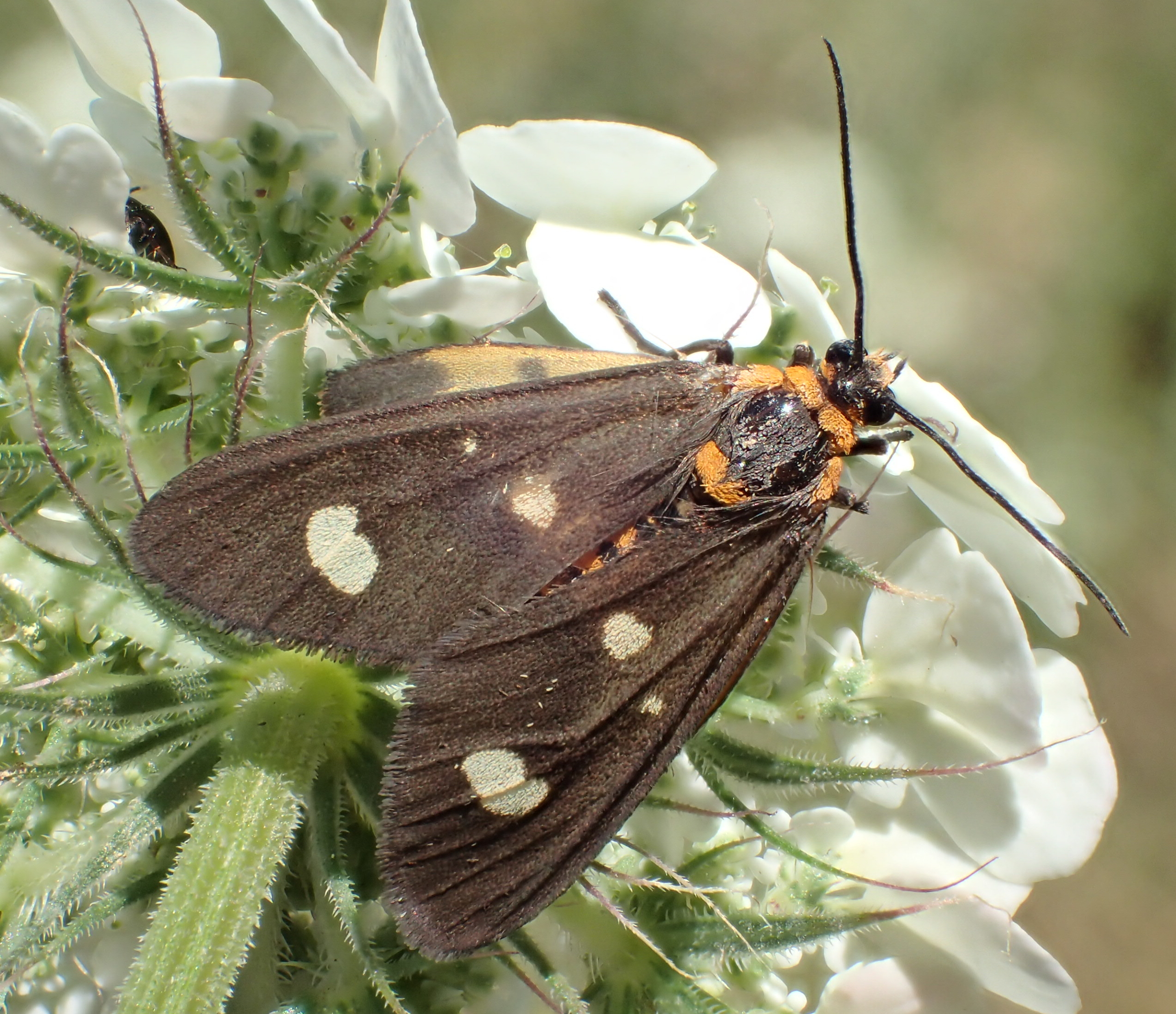

Scientific classification
- Kingdom: Animalia
- Phylum: Arthropoda
- Clade: Pancrustacea
- Class: Insecta
- Order: Lepidoptera
- Superfamily: Noctuoidea
- Family: Erebidae
- Subfamily: Arctiinae
- Genus: Dysauxes
- Species: D. famula

Binomial name
- Dysauxes famula (Freyer, 1836)

Synonyms
- Bombyx famula Freyer, 1836; Lithosia famula; Bombyx hyalina Freyer, 1845; Dysauxes punctata f. taurica Draudt, 1931 in Seitz; Dysauxes punctata f. burgeffi Draudt, 1931 in Seitz; Dysauxes famula pontica Friese, 1959; Dysauxes famula haberhaueri Friese, 1959; Parauxes famula sofiata de Laever, 1983; Parauxes famula lucana de Laever, 1983

= Dysauxes famula =

Species of moth

Dysauxes famula is a moth of the family Erebidae. It was described by Christian Friedrich Freyer in 1836. It is found in the Transcaspian Oblast, the Caucasus, Iran, Asia Minor, Israel, France, Switzerland, Italy, the Balkan Peninsula, Ukraine, as well as on Corsica, Sicily, Crete and Cyprus.

== Subspecies ==
- Dysauxes famula famula
- Dysauxes famula gravis Ignatyev & Zolotuhin, 2006 (Russian Far East)
