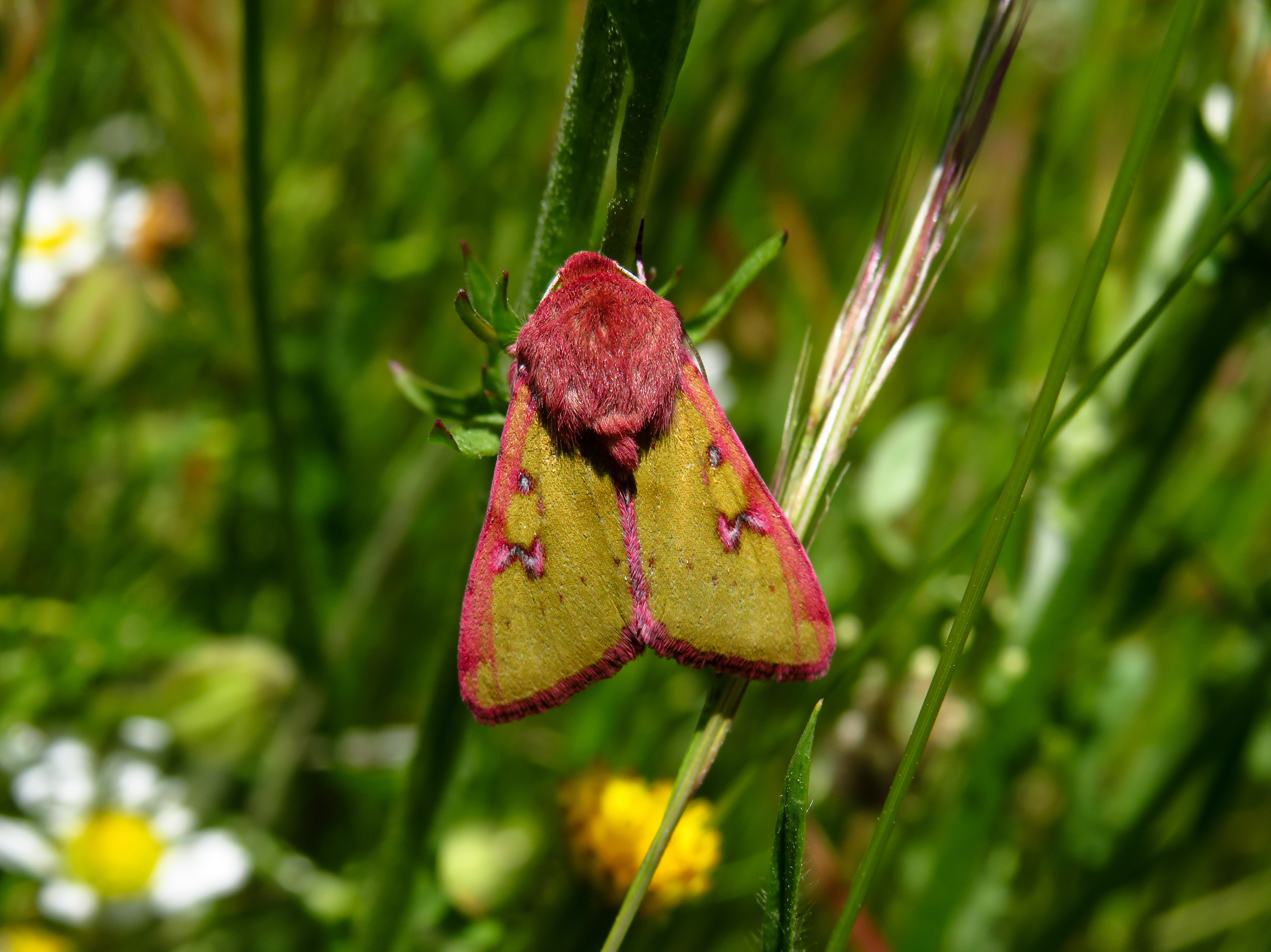

Scientific classification
- Kingdom: Animalia
- Phylum: Arthropoda
- Class: Insecta
- Order: Lepidoptera
- Superfamily: Noctuoidea
- Family: Noctuidae
- Genus: Chazaria
- Species: C. incarnata

Binomial name
- Chazaria incarnata (Freyer, 1838)

Synonyms
- Heliothis incarnata Freyer, 1838

= Chazaria incarnata =

Species of moth

Chazaria incarnata is a species of moth of the family Noctuidae. It is found on the Canary Islands and on the Iberian Peninsula, east to Italy, Serbia, Romania, Bulgaria, North Macedonia and Greece. Further east it is found to southern and eastern Russia in the north and Turkey, the Dead Sea region of Israel and Iran.

Adults are on wing from July to August.
