= Eliezer Trillinger =

Eliezer ben Joseph Yospa Trillinger (Hebrew: אליעזר בן יוסף יוזפא טרילינגר, romanized: Eliʻezer ben Yosef Yozpa Ṭrilinger; fl. late 17th–early 18th centuries), also known as Eliezer Nin of Nikolsburg, was an Austrian rabbi.

The name "Trillinger" likely originates from "Wassertrüdingen," historically known to Jews as "Wassertrilling" or "Trilling." Trillinger served as av beit din in several congregations. At an advanced age he set out for the Land of Israel, but on his way he fell ill at Vilna and died there. He was the author of Mishnat Rabbi Eli'ezer, a collection of derashot on the Pentateuch, published by his son Joseph Yospa at Frankfort-on-the-Oder in 1707.
