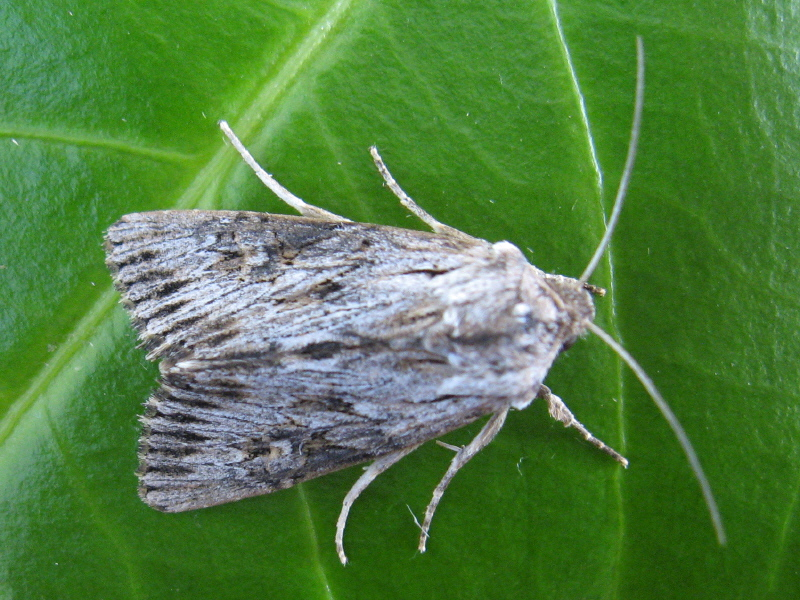

Scientific classification
- Kingdom: Animalia
- Phylum: Arthropoda
- Clade: Pancrustacea
- Class: Insecta
- Order: Lepidoptera
- Superfamily: Noctuoidea
- Family: Noctuidae
- Genus: Aporophyla
- Species: A. australis

Binomial name
- Aporophyla australis (Boisduval, 1829)

Synonyms
- Xylena australis Boisduval, 1829; Aporophyla ingenua var. britannica Staudinger, 1869; Xylina scriptura Freyer, 1838; Xylina ingenua Freyer, 1848; Xylophasia orientalis Herrich-Schäffer, [1850]; Aporophila australis var. morosa Bellier, 1862; Aporophyla albidior Bang-Haas, 1906; Agrotis pascuea Westwood, 1843; Aporophylla australis zeelandica Lempke, 1964

= Aporophyla australis =

Feathered brindle

Species of moth

Aporophyla australis, the feathered brindle, is a moth in the family Noctuidae. The species was first described by Jean Baptiste Boisduval in 1829. It is found in western and southern Europe, North Africa and the Middle East.

== Description ==
The adult has a pattern which ranges from pale grey to light and dark brown, the wingspan is 36-42 mm. It may be confused with the Northern deep-brown dart.

=== Technical description and variation ===
Forewing whitish grey with a slight lilac tinge; the veins darker, the costa, inner margin narrowly, a median shade between the stigmata, some wedge-shaped subterminal blotches in the interspaces before subterminal line, and the dark chequering of the fringe brown; inner and outer lines both strongly dentate, but rarely plain, except as streaks on inner margin; stigmata finely outlined with black, the orbicular narrow, oblique, the reniform broader, both, when clear, with a dark centre; the streak from base on submedian fold brown and indistinct; a brown shade often visible on submedian fold between claviform stigma and outer line; hindwing in male white, in female slightly flushed with brown; for this type form Guenée gives Provence and Corsica as localities; - ab. costata ab. nov. [Warren] is a larger form, with the brown tints of the type replaced by blackish fuscous, the costal area of forewing and the fringe especially darkened; the lines equally indistinct; of this I have seen a pair from Rome, a female marked simply Germany, and a single male from Amasia : - scriptura Frr. is uniform dark grey, with the inner and outer lines distinct and dentate; —of this ingenua Frr. is an extreme dark form with the markings in some cases quite lost in the dark suffusion: these last forms are from Greece, Turkey, and Asia Minor; . — cinerea Stgr., from Morocco, is also described as having the forewings unicolorous grey; — pascuea is the British form, which is nearest the type, but whiter, with all the markings very strongly developed and black in the male, the female pinkish grey; the orbicular stigma varies much in this form from a small round to a long elliptical mark becoming confluent with the reniform. The larva is yellowish green tinged with reddish above; a pale reddish line along the middle of the back has black V-shaped marks upon it, and there is a series of black marks on each side; the line along the spiracles is yellowish. The head iis green, brown freckled.

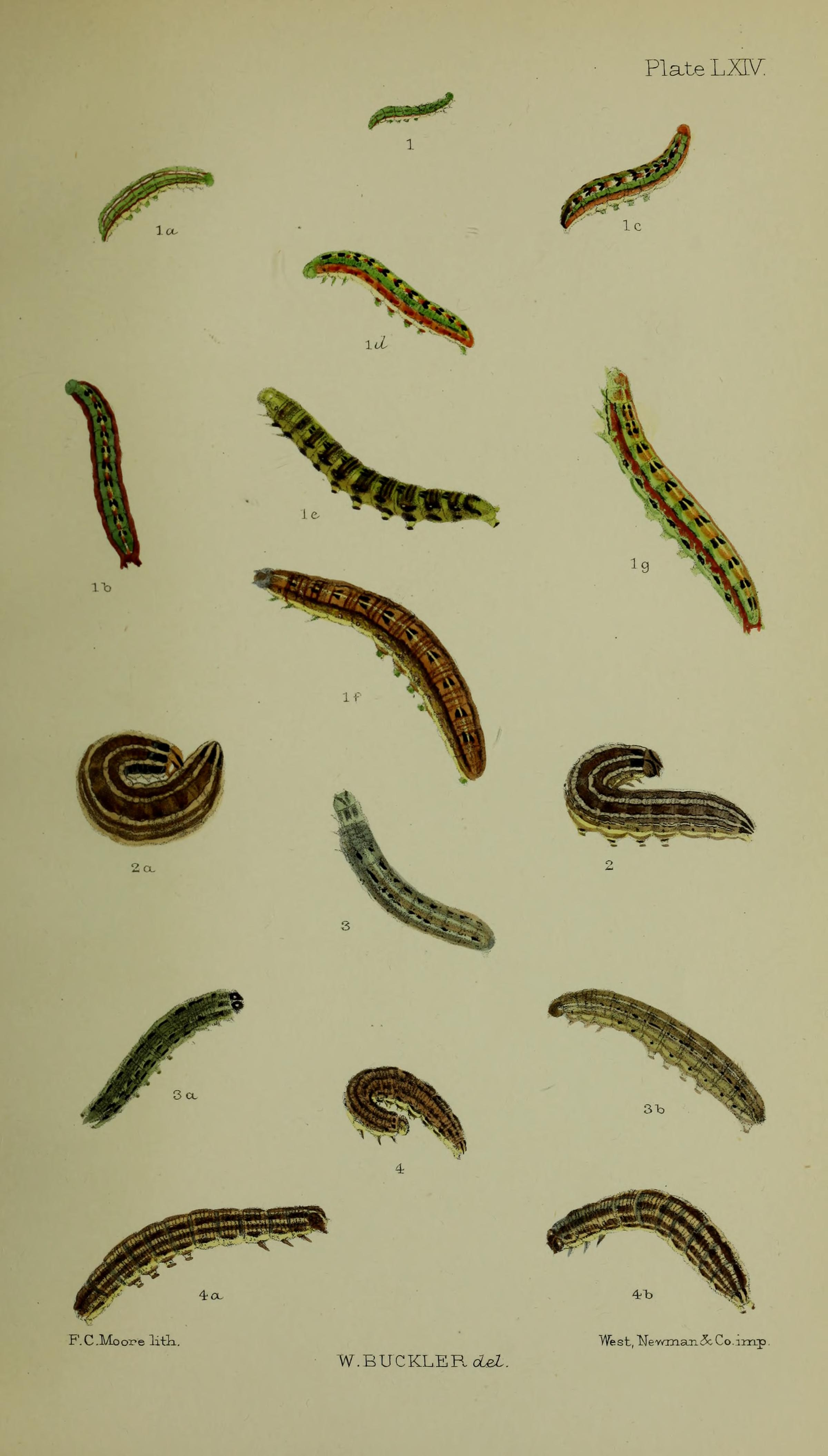
1, 1a, 1c young larva 1b, 1d, 1e, 1f, 1g larva after last moult

=== Subspecies ===
- Aporophyla australis australis
- Aporophyla australis pascuea (Westwood, 1843) (Great Britain)

== Life cycle ==
The larvae feed on various plants, including Silene maritima and grasses. The larvae can be found from October to May. The species overwinters in the larval stage. Pupation takes place under moss or underground.

In the British Isles adults fly rom August to October in one generation per year. In the Balkans there are two generations per year and the flight period is from August to December.

== Distribution ==
It is found on calcareous grassland, heaths, olive groves, garrigue (phrygana), and roadsides. Distribution is more common near the coast.
