= Dysauxes servula =

Scientific classification
- Domain: Eukaryota
- Kingdom: Animalia
- Phylum: Arthropoda
- Class: Insecta
- Order: Lepidoptera
- Superfamily: Noctuoidea
- Family: Erebidae
- Subfamily: Arctiinae
- Genus: Dysauxes
- Species: D. servula

Binomial name
- Dysauxes servula (Berce, 1862)

Synonyms
- Naclia servula Berce, 1862; Dysauxes punctata var. separata Bang-Haas, 1906

Species of moth

Dysauxes servula is a moth of the family Erebidae. It was described by M. Berce in 1862. It is found in southern France, north-western Italy, Sicily, Spain and Portugal, as well as the Maghreb countries in North Africa.

== Taxonomy ==
The species is either treated as a valid species, a colour form, subspecies or synonym of Dysauxes punctata, from which it differs by having no or very small white spots on the forewings and strongly reduced yellow colouring of the hindwings.
