= Thalpophila vitalba =

Scientific classification
- Kingdom: Animalia
- Phylum: Arthropoda
- Class: Insecta
- Order: Lepidoptera
- Superfamily: Noctuoidea
- Family: Noctuidae
- Genus: Thalpophila
- Species: T. vitalba

Binomial name
- Thalpophila vitalba (Freyer, 1834)

Synonyms
- Hadena vitalba Freyer, 1834; Cerigo amathusia Rambur, 1871

Species of moth

Thalpophila vitalba is a moth of the family Noctuidae. It was described by Christian Friedrich Freyer in 1834. It is found in southern Europe and north-western Africa.
