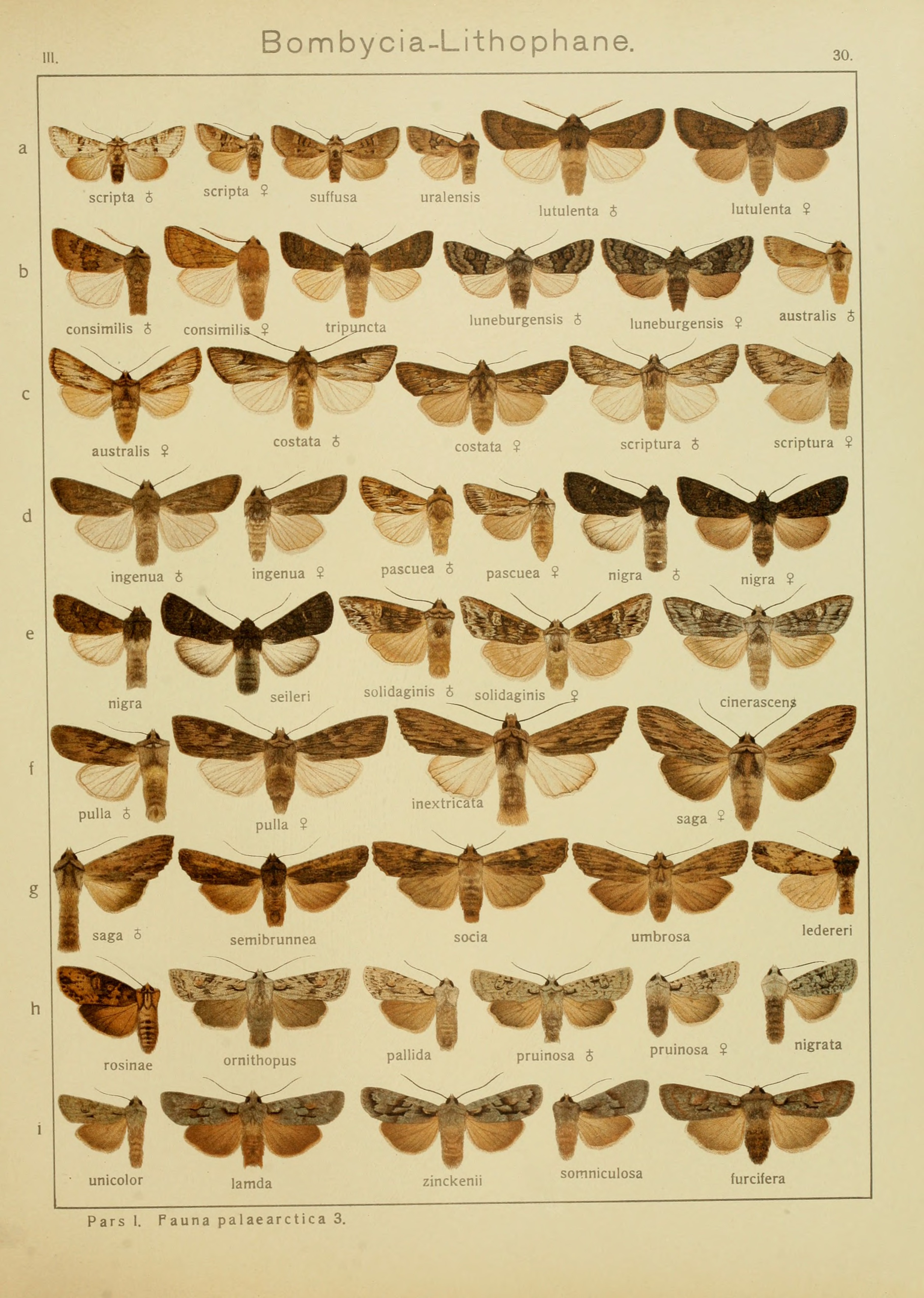
- Aporophyla lueneburgensis 30b

Scientific classification
- Kingdom: Animalia
- Phylum: Arthropoda
- Class: Insecta
- Order: Lepidoptera
- Superfamily: Noctuoidea
- Family: Noctuidae
- Genus: Aporophyla
- Species: A. lueneburgensis

Binomial name
- Aporophyla lueneburgensis (Freyer, 1848)

= Northern deep-brown dart =

Species of moth

The northern deep-brown dart (Aporophyla lueneburgensis) is a moth of the family Noctuidae. It was first described by Christian Friedrich Freyer in 1848. It is found in northern and western Europe.

As the common name suggests, this species usually has very dark brown to purplish grey forewings, although paler grey forms exist. There is always a much darker central band, almost black in the darker forms. All the lines and stigmata are very neatly marked and edged in a paler color. By contrast, the hindwings are much paler, often almost pure white in the male, but usually with darker venation. The wingspan is 36–41 mm. It is a decidedly smaller and neater insect than Aporophyla lutulenta. It flies at night during August and September. It is attracted to light and sugar as well as various flowers.

The larva usually feeds on heather, but has been recorded on other low plants such as bird's-foot trefoil. This species overwinters as a small larva.

== Taxonomy ==
Aporophyla lueneburgensis may be a subspecies of Aporophyla lutulenta.

1. The flight season refers to the British Isles. This may vary in other parts of the range.
