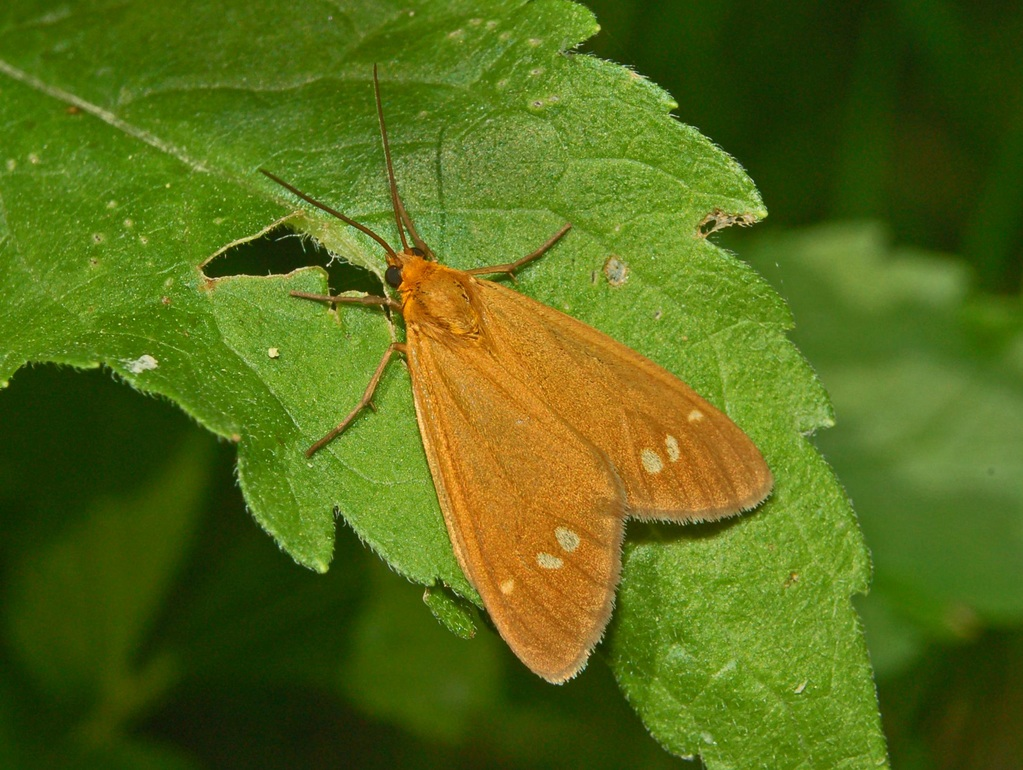
- Dysauxes ancilla

Scientific classification
- Kingdom: Animalia
- Phylum: Arthropoda
- Clade: Pancrustacea
- Class: Insecta
- Order: Lepidoptera
- Superfamily: Noctuoidea
- Family: Erebidae
- Subfamily: Arctiinae
- Tribe: Syntomini
- Genus: Dysauxes; Hubner, 1819

Synonyms
- Naclia Boisduval, 1840; Parauxes de Laever, 1983; Adauctis Ignatyev & Zolotuhin, 2006

= Dysauxes =

Genus of moths

Dysauxes is a genus of moths in the family Erebidae. The genus was erected by Jacob Hübner in 1819.

== Species ==
- Subgenus Dysauxes
  - Dysauxes ancilla (Linnaeus, 1767)
  - Dysauxes famula (Freyer, 1836)
  - Dysauxes fraterna Ignatyev & Zolotuhin, 2006
  - Dysauxes kaschmiriensis Rothschild, 1910
  - Dysauxes parvigutta (Christoph, 1889)
  - Dysauxes syntomida (Staudinger, 1892)
- Subgenus Adauctis Ignatyev & Zolotuhin, 2006
  - Dysauxes punctata (Fabricius, 1781)
  - Dysauxes servula (Berce, 1862)
