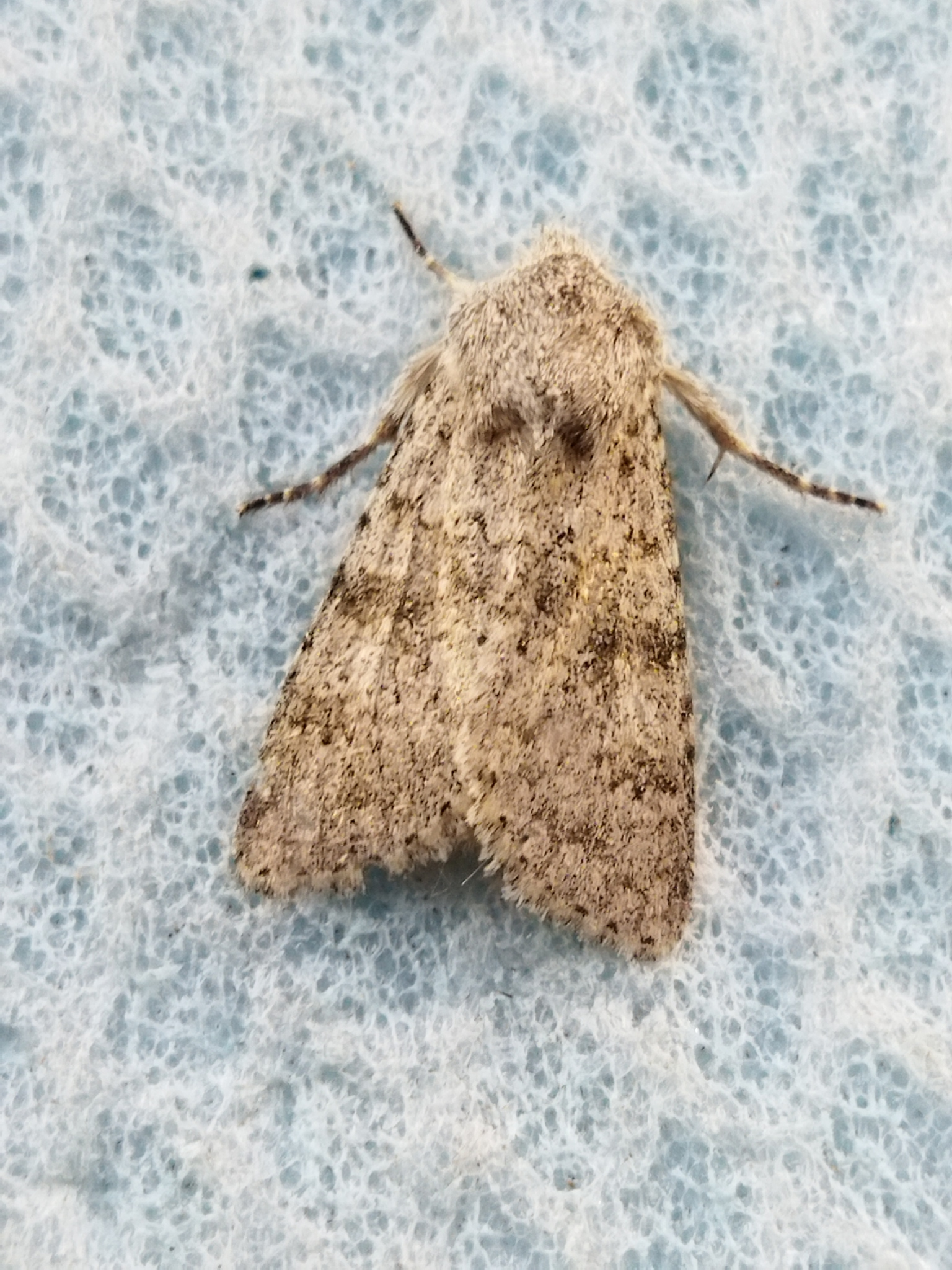

Scientific classification
- Kingdom: Animalia
- Phylum: Arthropoda
- Class: Insecta
- Order: Lepidoptera
- Superfamily: Noctuoidea
- Family: Noctuidae
- Genus: Aporophyla
- Species: A. canescens

Binomial name
- Aporophyla canescens (Duponchel, [1826])

Synonyms
- List: Noctua canescens Duponchel, 1826; Noctua pumicosa Geyer, [1832]; Polia asphodeli Rambur, 1832; Polia plumbea Staudinger, 1895; Aporophyla ochracea Spuler, 1908; Aporophyla calida Turati, 1909; Aporophyla asphodelioides Turati, 1909; Polia (Antitype) canescens f. aritzensis Turati, 1913; Aporophyla plumbina Osthelder, 1933

= Aporophyla canescens =

Species of moth

Aporophyla canescens is a species of moth in the family Noctuidae. It was described by Philogène Auguste Joseph Duponchel in 1826. It is found in Italy, Switzerland, Slovenia, Croatia, Albania, Bosnia and Herzegovina, Serbia, North Macedonia, Greece, Turkey, Israel, Portugal, Russia, as well as on Sardinia, Corsica, Sicily, Malta and Crete.

The wingspan is 40–45 mm. Adults have been recorded on wing from August to November. The larvae feed on Asphodelus and Narcissus species.
