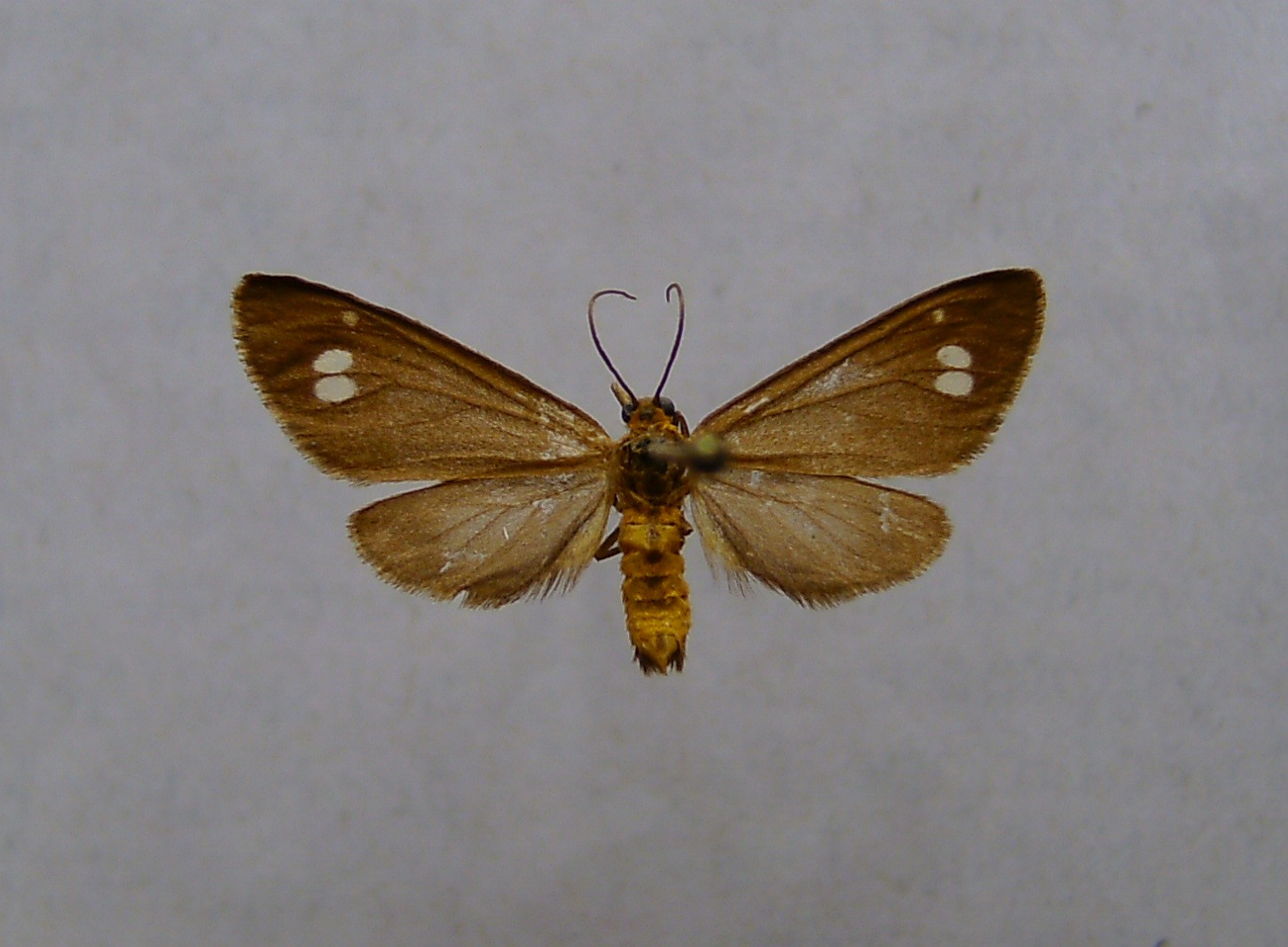

Scientific classification
- Kingdom: Animalia
- Phylum: Arthropoda
- Class: Insecta
- Order: Lepidoptera
- Superfamily: Noctuoidea
- Family: Erebidae
- Subfamily: Arctiinae
- Genus: Dysauxes
- Species: D. ancilla

Binomial name
- Dysauxes ancilla (Linnaeus, 1767)

Synonyms
- Phalaena Noctua ancilla Linnaeus, 1767; Bombyx obscura Fabricius, 1781; Phalaena lemopicta Fourcroy, 1785; Phalaena fuscoptera Fourcroy, 1785; Dysauxes ancilla race abundans Dannehl, 1933; Naclia Modesta Krulikowsky, 1895

= Dysauxes ancilla =

Handmaid

Species of moth

Dysauxes ancilla, the handmaid, is a moth of the family Erebidae. The species was first described by Carl Linnaeus in his 1767 12th edition of Systema Naturae. It lives in southern and central Europe, through Turkey and Armenia, over the Ural Mountains and up to the Caucasus.

The wingspan is 22–25 mm.

The larvae primarily feed on Taraxacum, Senecio, Plantago and Lactuca species.
