= Dysauxes fraterna =

Scientific classification
- Kingdom: Animalia
- Phylum: Arthropoda
- Clade: Pancrustacea
- Class: Insecta
- Order: Lepidoptera
- Superfamily: Noctuoidea
- Family: Erebidae
- Subfamily: Arctiinae
- Genus: Dysauxes
- Species: D. fraterna

Binomial name
- Dysauxes fraterna Ignatyev & Zolotuhin, 2006

Species of moth

Dysauxes fraterna is a moth of the family Erebidae. It was described by Nikolay N. Ignatyev and Vadim V. Zolotuhin in 2006. It is found in Armenia.
