= Aporophyla chioleuca =

Scientific classification
- Domain: Eukaryota
- Kingdom: Animalia
- Phylum: Arthropoda
- Class: Insecta
- Order: Lepidoptera
- Superfamily: Noctuoidea
- Family: Noctuidae
- Genus: Aporophyla
- Species: A. chioleuca

Binomial name
- Aporophyla chioleuca (Herrich-Schäffer, [1850])

Synonyms
- Polia chioleuca Herrich-Schäffer, 1850; Aporophyla mioleuca var. corticosa Lederer, 1857; Aporophyla chioleuca murciensis Lajonquiére, 1969; Aporophyla mioleuca Treitschke, 1835

Species of moth

Aporophyla chioleuca is a moth of the family Noctuidae. It was described by Gottlieb August Wilhelm Herrich-Schäffer in 1850. It is found in Portugal, Spain and Greece, as well as on Sardinia, Sicily, Malta and Crete.

== Subspecies ==
- Aporophyla chioleuca chioleuca
- Aporophyla chioleuca sammuti Fibiger, Yela, Zilli & Ronkay 2010 (Portugal, Malta)
