= Philareta =

Scientific classification
- Domain: Eukaryota
- Kingdom: Animalia
- Phylum: Arthropoda
- Class: Insecta
- Order: Lepidoptera
- Superfamily: Noctuoidea
- Family: Noctuidae
- Subfamily: Heliothinae
- Genus: Philareta; Moore, 1881

Genus of moths

Philareta was a genus of moths of the family Noctuidae, it is now considered a synonym of Chazaria.
