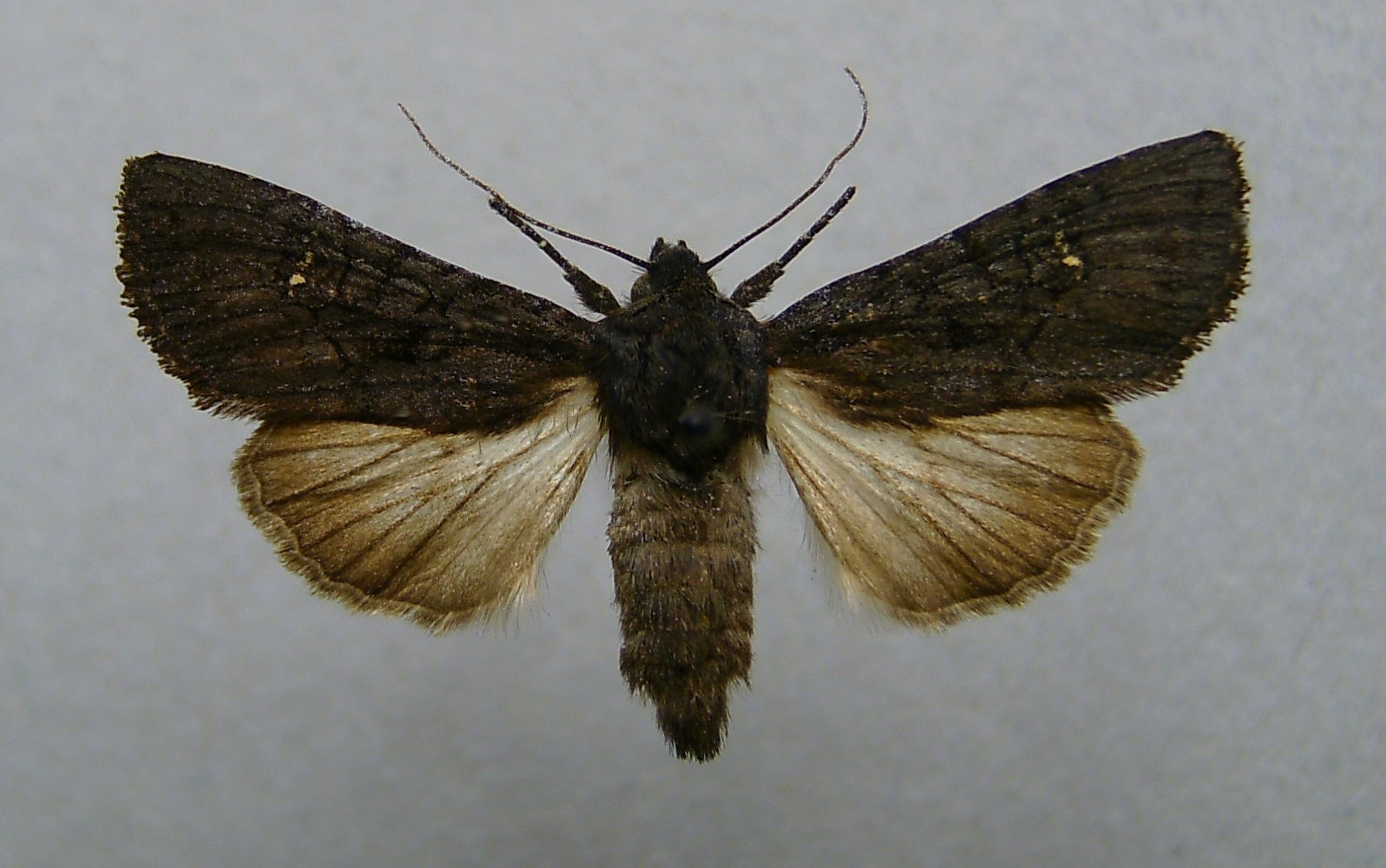

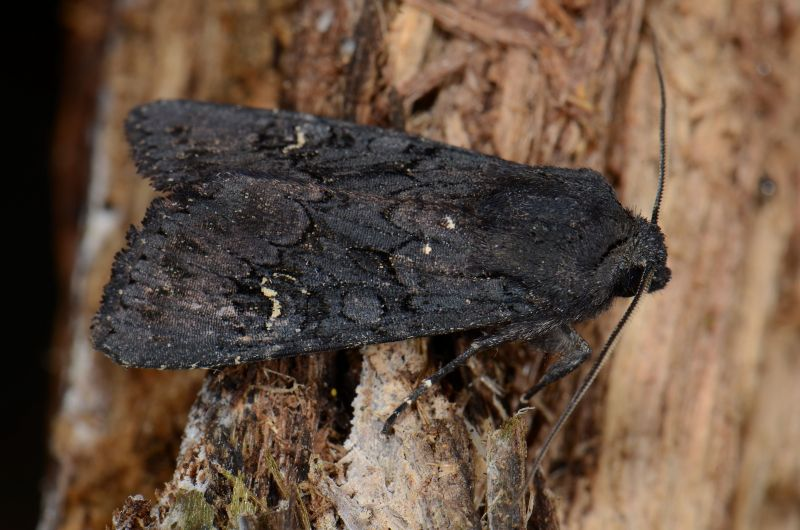

Scientific classification
- Kingdom: Animalia
- Phylum: Arthropoda
- Class: Insecta
- Order: Lepidoptera
- Superfamily: Noctuoidea
- Family: Noctuidae
- Genus: Aporophyla
- Species: A. nigra

Binomial name
- Aporophyla nigra (Haworth, 1809)

Synonyms
- Noctua nigra Haworth, 1809; Phalaena Noctua lunula Ström, 1768 (preocc. Phalaena lunula Hufnagel, 1766); Noctua nigricans Hübner, [1813]; Aporophylla nigra var. seileri Fuchs, 1901

= Aporophyla nigra =

Black rustic

Species of moth

Aporophyla nigra, the black rustic, is a moth of the family Noctuidae. The species was first described by Adrian Hardy Haworth in 1809. It is found from North Africa, through southern and central Europe to Anatolia, in the north it is found up to Scotland and southern Norway. It is also found in the Caucasus, Israel and Lebanon.

== Description ==
The wingspan is 40–48 mm. Forewing deep black, the outer area beyond outer line often appearing brown; the inner and outer lines and the edges of stigmata deeper black; outer edge of reniform marked with yellowish spots; subterminal line rarely visible; hindwing in male white, sometimes with veins and termen clouded with fuscous, in female smoky grey brown, more whitish towards base; — ab. seileri Fuchs includes the intenser black forms without any trace of brown.

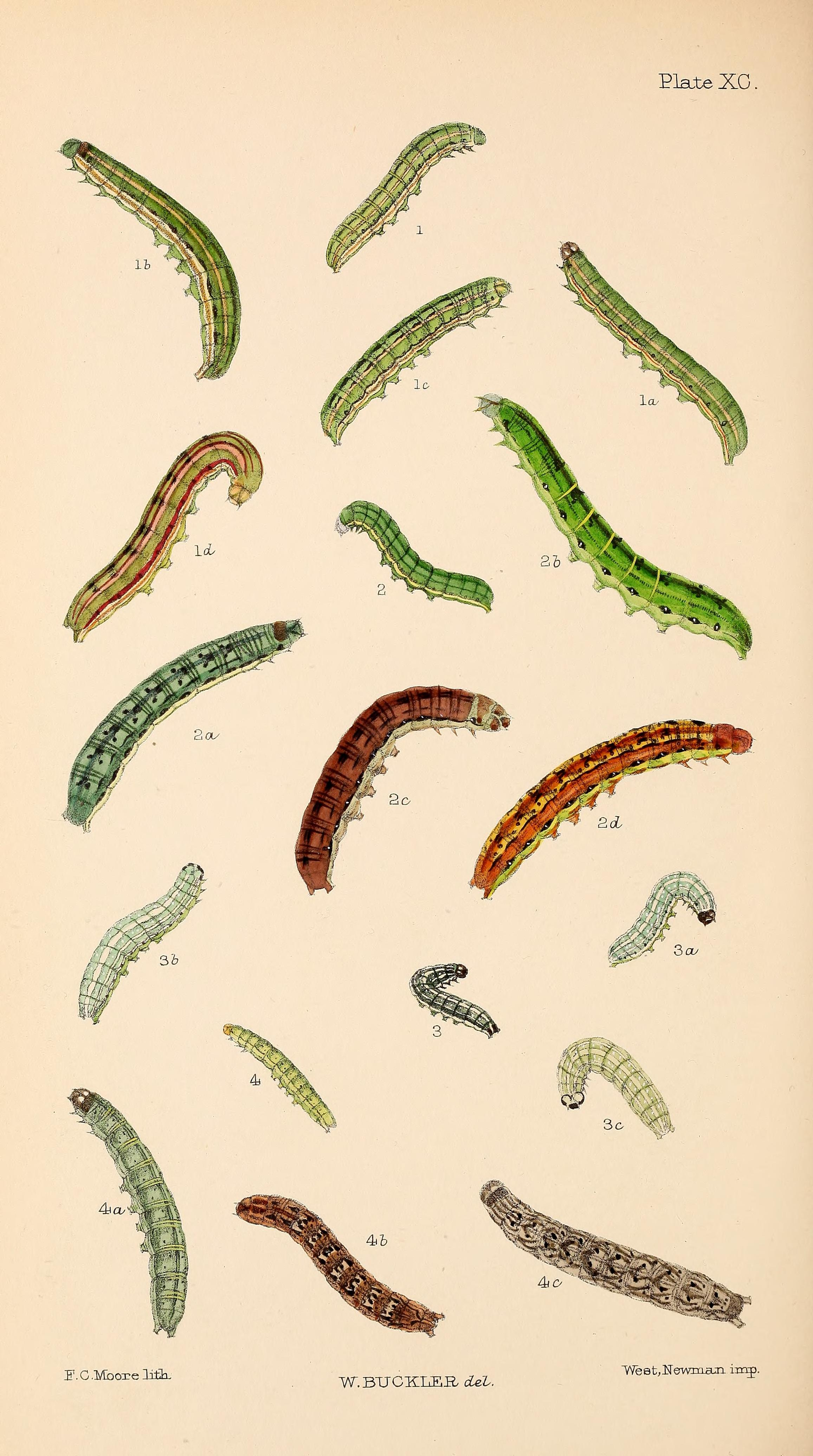
Figs 2, 2a, 2b, 2c, 2d larvae in various stages of growth

== Biology ==
Adults are on wing in September and October and sometimes also in December and January.

Larva yellow green, with three well-marked red dorsal lines and a similar coloured lateral line; spiracles white; or green with the dorsal lines confluent, brown red, divided finely by white; the brown-red subdorsal and spiracular lines confluent into a broad band, with a yellow-red-edged streak below it. The larvae feed on various plants, including Poaceae, Trifolium, Rumex, Sanguisorba minor and Genista.
