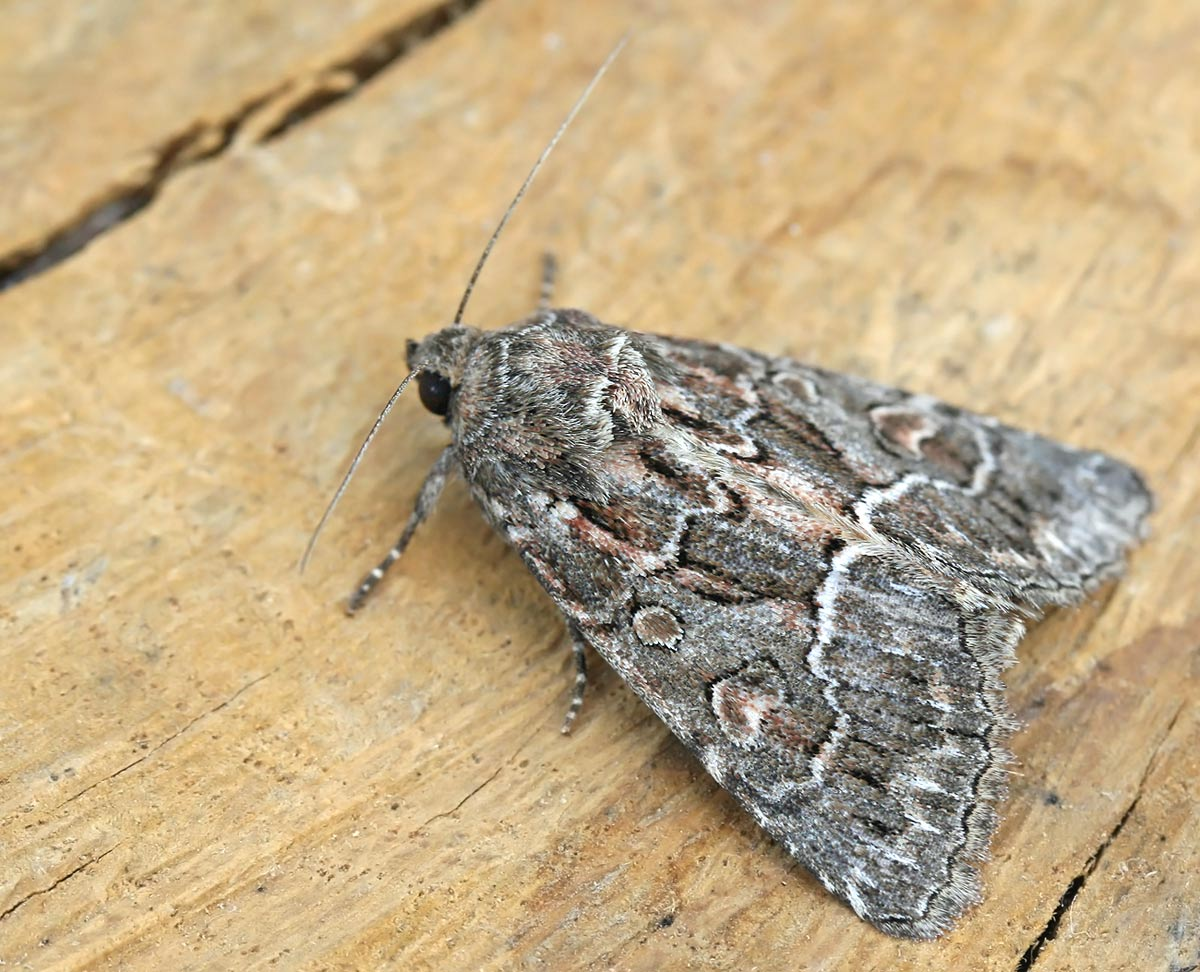
- Thalpophila matura

Scientific classification
- Domain: Eukaryota
- Kingdom: Animalia
- Phylum: Arthropoda
- Class: Insecta
- Order: Lepidoptera
- Superfamily: Noctuoidea
- Family: Noctuidae
- Tribe: Dypterygiini
- Genus: Thalpophila; Hübner, 1820

Synonyms
- Cerigo Stephens, 1829

= Thalpophila =

Genus of moths

Thalpophila is a genus of moths of the family Noctuidae.

== Species ==
- Thalpophila matura (Hufnagel, 1766)
- Thalpophila vitalba (Freyer, 1834)
