= Dysauxes syntomida =

Scientific classification
- Domain: Eukaryota
- Kingdom: Animalia
- Phylum: Arthropoda
- Class: Insecta
- Order: Lepidoptera
- Superfamily: Noctuoidea
- Family: Erebidae
- Subfamily: Arctiinae
- Genus: Dysauxes
- Species: D. syntomida

Binomial name
- Dysauxes syntomida (Staudinger, 1892)

Synonyms
- Naclia syntomida Staudinger, [1892]

Species of moth

Dysauxes syntomida is a moth of the family Erebidae. It was described by Otto Staudinger in 1892. It is found in Kurdistan.
