= Chazaria =

Scientific classification
- Domain: Eukaryota
- Kingdom: Animalia
- Phylum: Arthropoda
- Class: Insecta
- Order: Lepidoptera
- Superfamily: Noctuoidea
- Family: Noctuidae
- Subfamily: Heliothinae
- Genus: Chazaria; Moore, 1881

Synonyms
- Philareta Moore, 1881

Genus of moths

Chazaria is a genus of moths of the family Noctuidae.

== Species ==
- Chazaria incarnata (Freyer, 1838)
