= Johannes Seidlitz =

German racing driver (born 1990)

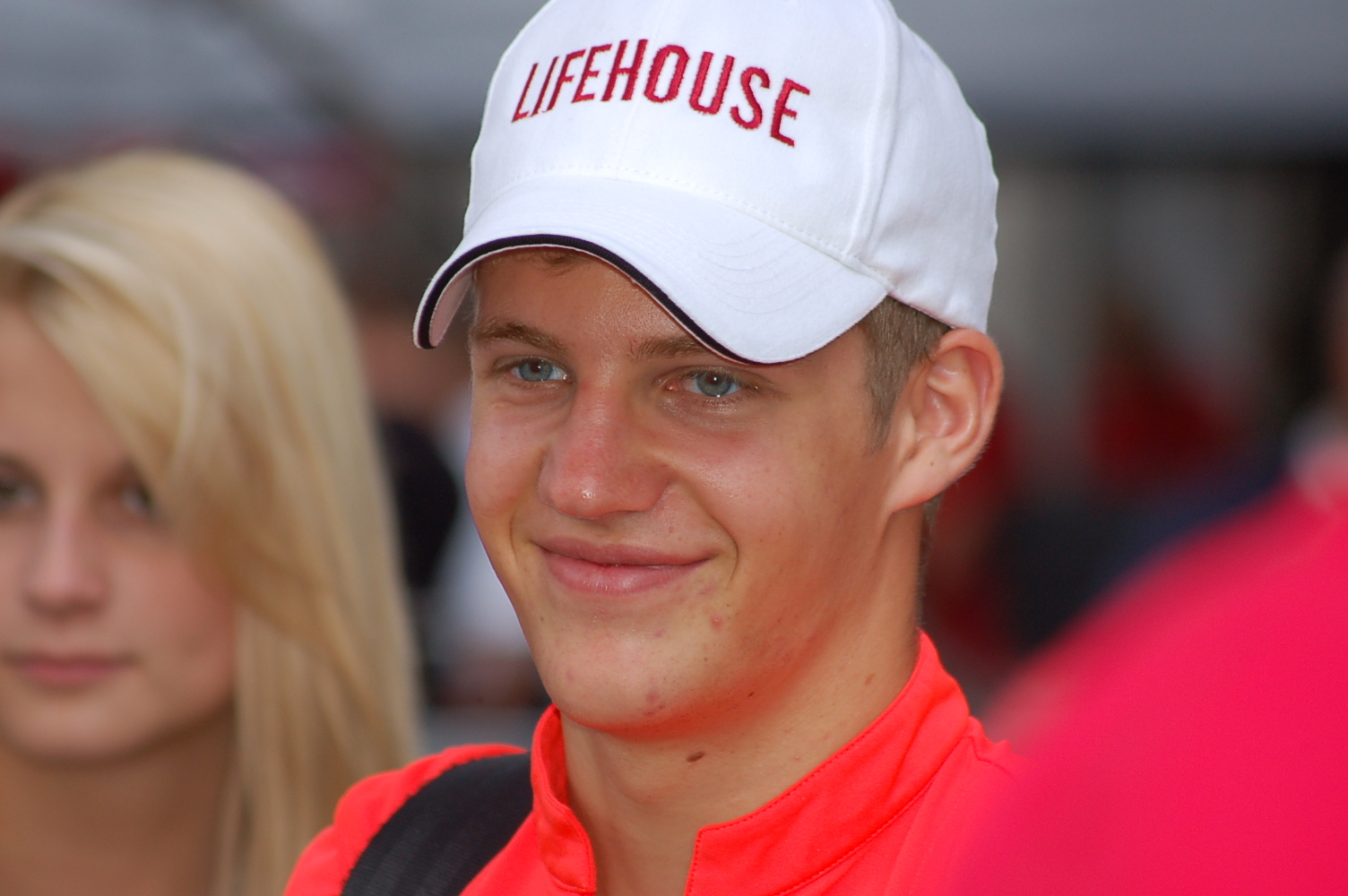
- Seidlitz at the fifth round of the 2009 DTM season at Oschersleben
- Nationality: (Germany) German
- Born: 13 June 1990 (age 36) Wassertrüdingen (Germany)

ADAC GT Masters career
- Debut season: 2009
- Car number: 19
- Starts: 7
- Wins: 0
- Poles: 0
- Fastest laps: 0
- Best finish: 20th in 2009

Previous series
- 2007 2008: Formula BMW; Formula Renault BARC

Johannes Seidlitz (born 13 June 1990) is a German racing driver from Wassertrüdingen. He currently competes in the ADAC GT Masters championship.

== Racing career ==
=== Single-seaters ===
After competing in karting between 2001 and 2006, Seidlitz moved onto Formula BMW, competing in Formula BMW ADAC in 2007.

Seidlitz moved into the British Formula Renault BARC series for 2008. He collected four wins and two second places on his way to second in the final championship standings, finishing behind Ollie Hancock for Mark Burdett Motorsport.

=== DTM (2009-) ===
Despite being relatively unknown, even in his native Germany, Seidlitz was signed by Colin Kolles to drive a two-year-old Audi A4 for his DTM team for 2009. He finished thirteenth on his debut at Hockenheimring, but suffered a crash in free practice ahead of the second round at EuroSpeedway Lausitz, damaging his car beyond repair for the race, or the following race at the Norisring.

=== ADAC GT Masters (2010-) ===
Seidlitz is currently racing with Team Rosberg in an Audi R8 LMS. Two of his team mates are Kenneth Heyer and Michael Ammermüller.

== Racing record ==
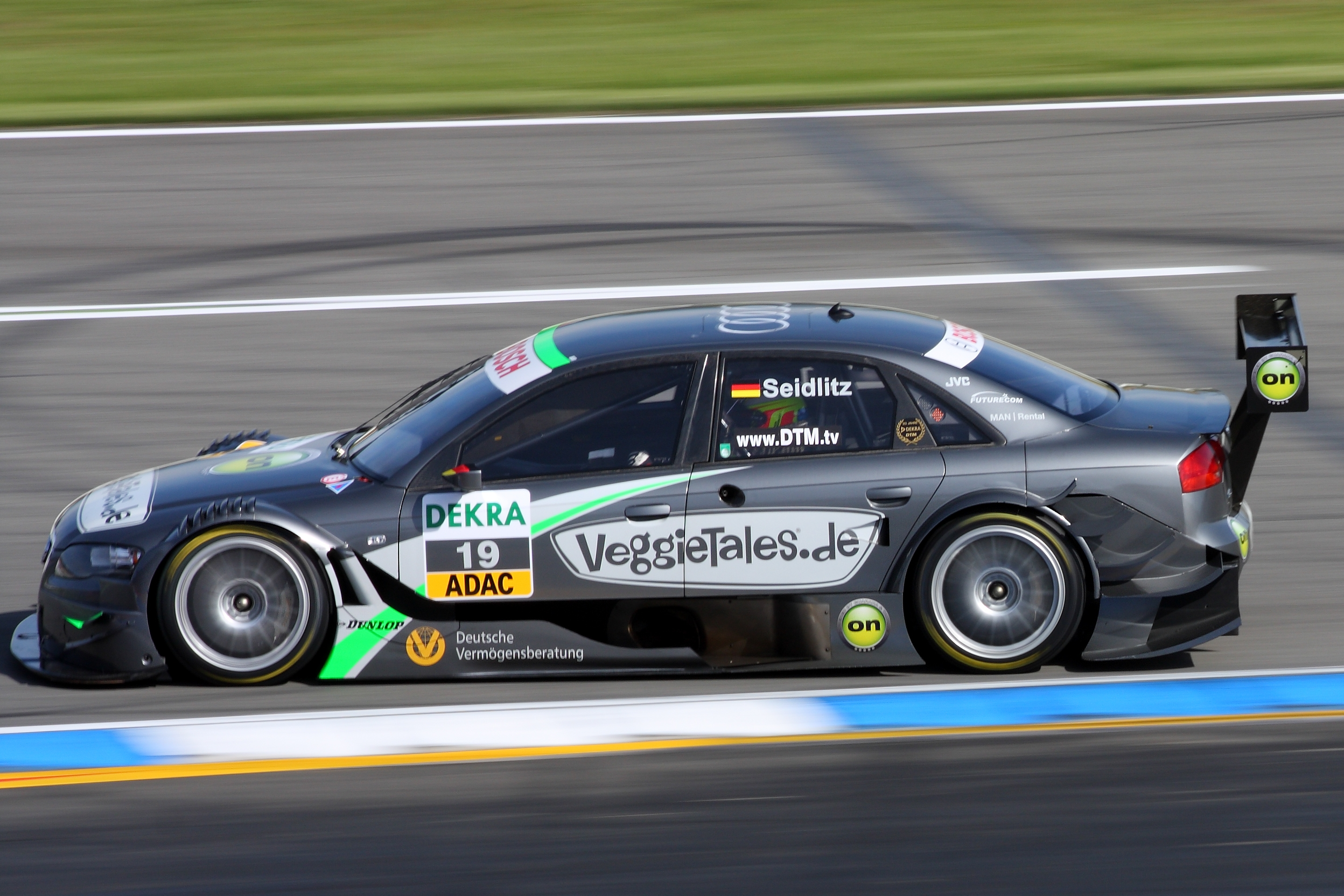
Seidlitz competing at the opening round of the 2009 Deutsche Tourenwagen Masters season at Hockenheim.

=== Complete DTM results ===
(key) (Races in bold indicate pole position) (Races in italics indicate fastest lap)

Year	Team	1	2	3	4	5	6	7	8	9	10	Pos	Points
2009	Kolles Futurecom	HOC; 13	LAU; DNS	NOR	ZAN	OSC; Ret	NÜR; 14	BRH; 17	CAT; 18	DIJ; Ret	HOC; 13	20th	0
