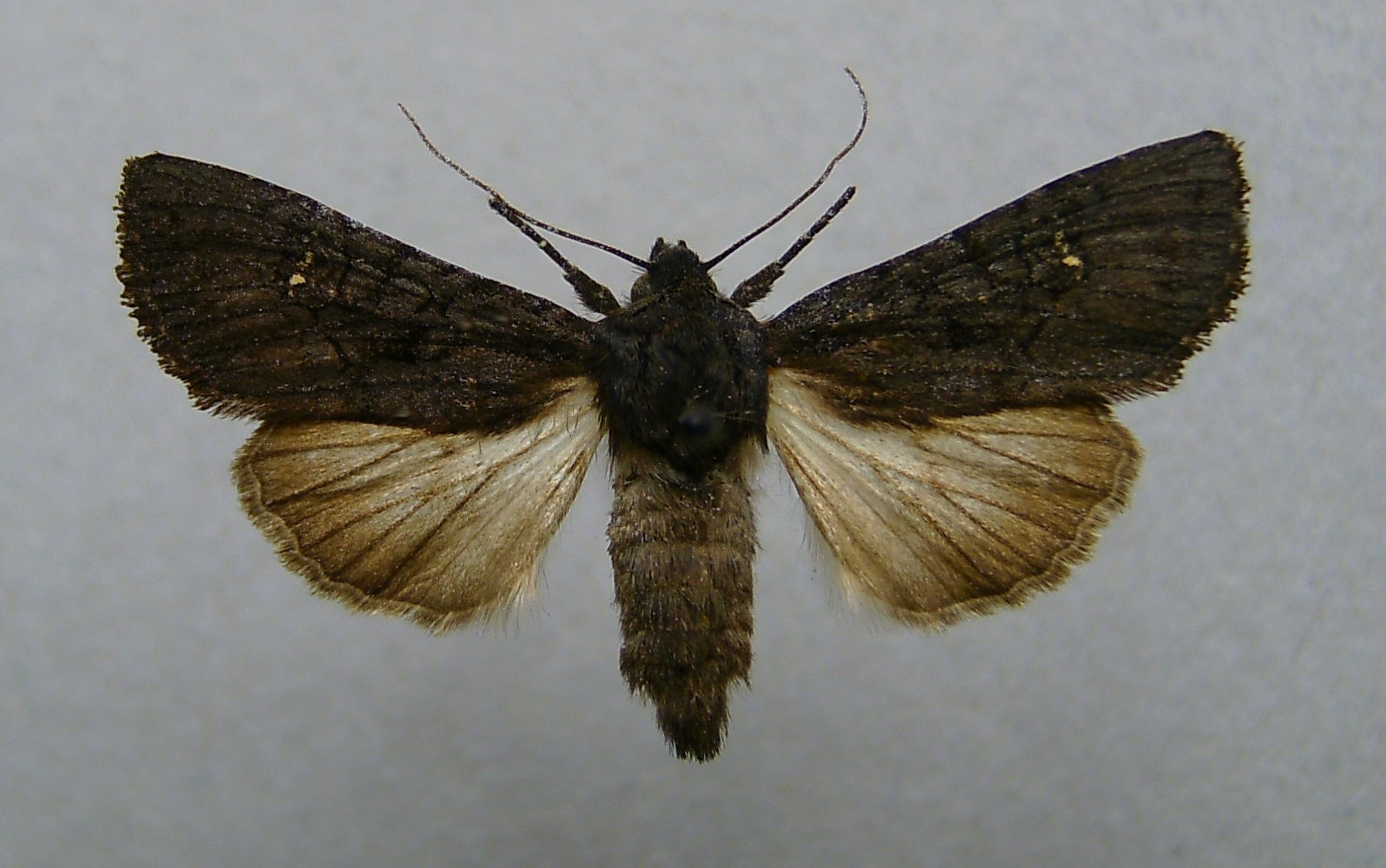
- Aporophyla nigra

Scientific classification
- Kingdom: Animalia
- Phylum: Arthropoda
- Class: Insecta
- Order: Lepidoptera
- Superfamily: Noctuoidea
- Family: Noctuidae
- Subtribe: Antitypina
- Genus: Aporophyla; Guenée, 1841

= Aporophyla =

Genus of moths

Aporophyla is a genus of moths of the family Noctuidae. The genus was erected by Achille Guenée in 1841.

== Species ==
- Aporophyla australis (Boisduval, 1829) – feathered brindle
- Aporophyla canescens (Duponchel, 1826)
- Aporophyla chioleuca (Herrich-Schäeffer, [1850])
- Aporophyla dipsalea Wiltshire, 1941
- Aporophyla lueneburgensis (Freyer, 1848) – northern deep-brown dart
- Aporophyla lutulenta (Denis & Schiffermüller, 1775) – deep brown dart
- Aporophyla nigra (Haworth, 1809) – black rustic
