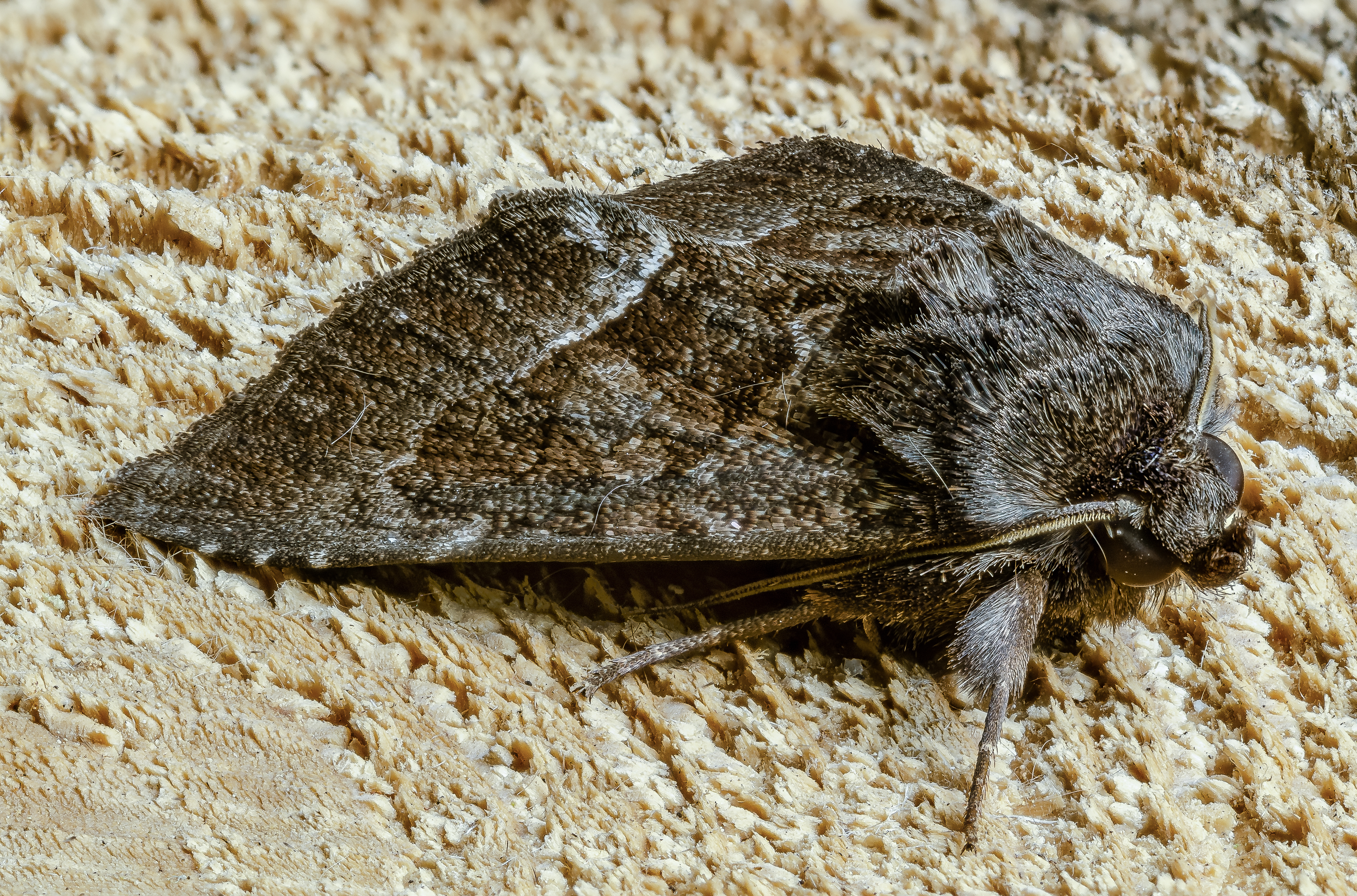

Scientific classification
- Domain: Eukaryota
- Kingdom: Animalia
- Phylum: Arthropoda
- Class: Insecta
- Order: Lepidoptera
- Superfamily: Noctuoidea
- Family: Noctuidae
- Genus: Thalpophila
- Species: T. matura

Binomial name
- Thalpophila matura (Hufnagel, 1766)

= Straw underwing =

Species of moth

The straw underwing (Thalpophila matura) is a species of moth in the family Noctuidae. The species was first described by Johann Siegfried Hufnagel in 1766. It is found from North Africa west through South Europe and Central Europe. In the north it is in parts of Ireland, Scotland, Sweden, Norway, Finland and Estonia. Further east the range stretches from southern Russia and Asia minor to the Caucasus.

This species has a wingspan of 38–46 mm. The forewings are dark brown, often variegated with paler and reddish patches and usually with prominent whitish postterminal fascia. The hindwings are very distinctive, pale straw coloured with a broad blackish band at the margin.

== Technical description and variation ==
Wingspan 38–46 mm. Forewing grey brown with darker dusting and suffusion; veins towards termen pale grey; a slight rufous tinge longitudinally along both folds, more conspicuous at the outer edge of reniform stigma; inner and outer lines black, conversely pale edged; the submarginal obscurely pale, indented on each fold, and preceded by a dark shade; the three stigmata black edged, their centres more or less tinged with rufous, the orbicular and reniform with an obscure pale ring; hindwing straw yellow with a broad fuscous terminal border, broadening at apex; in the form texta Esp. the forewing is darker and duller, with the paler markings all obscured.

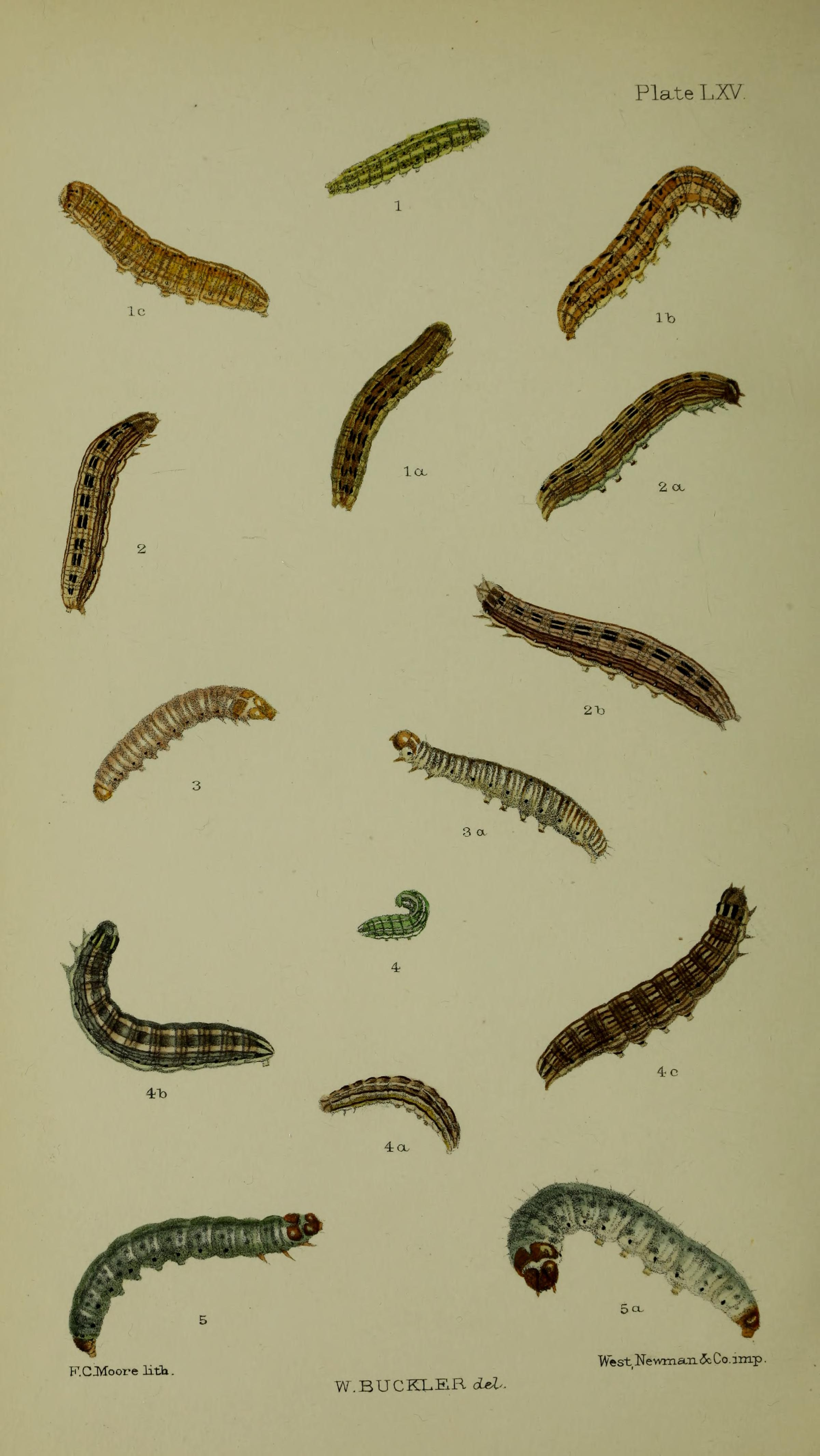
Figs 2, 2a, 2b larva after last moult

== Biology ==
This moth flies at night in July and August and is attracted to light, sugar and various nectar-rich flowers.

Larva grey brown; dorsal line dark with pale centre; on each side a series of pale and dark longitudinal lines, the subdorsal and lateral edged with darker. It feeds on various grasses such as Dactylis. This species overwinters as a small larva.

Prefers dry grassland habitats, forest edges, and park-like landscapes.

1. The flight season refers to the British Isles. This may vary in other parts of the range.

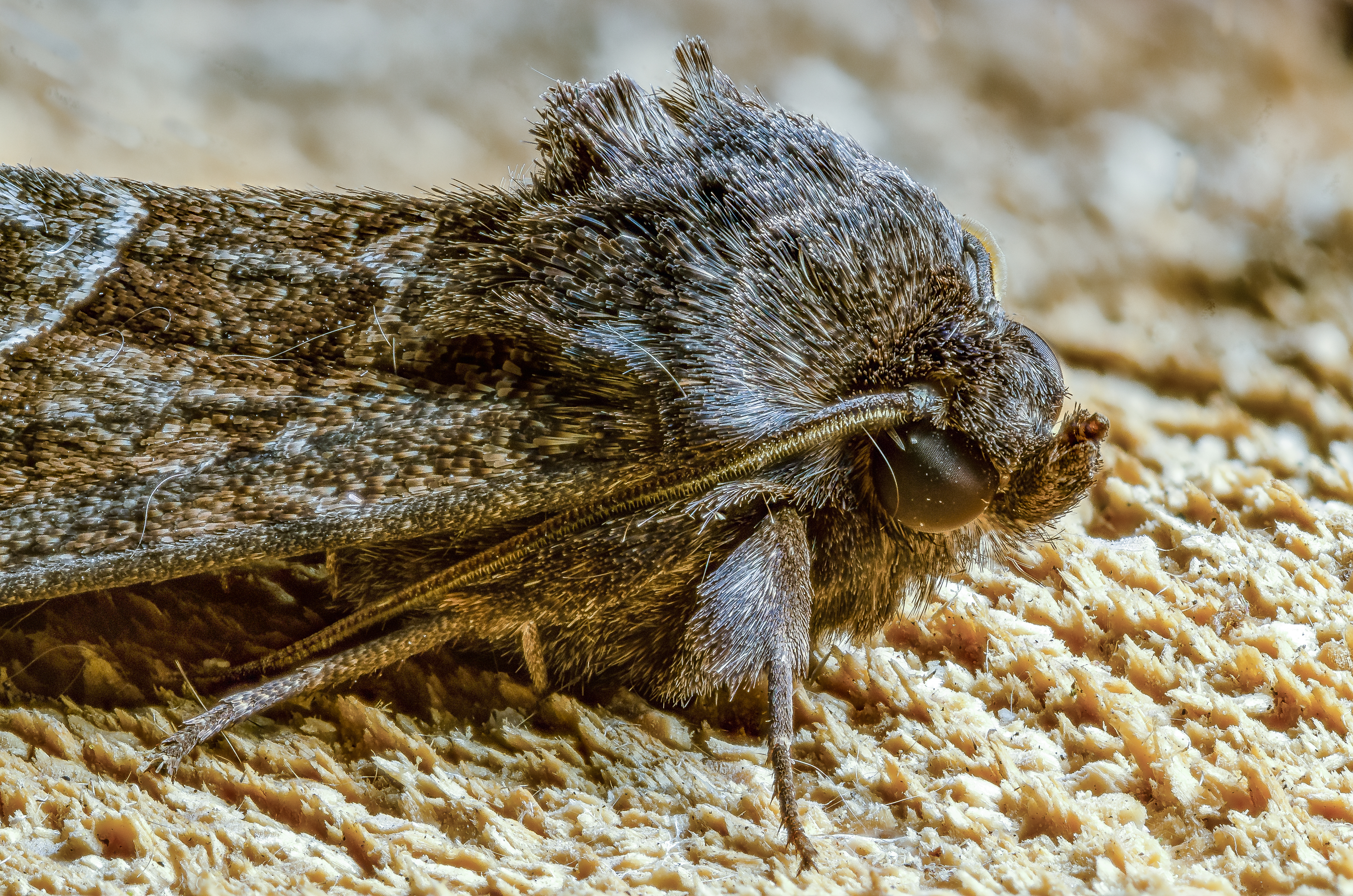
Detail of the front part of the body

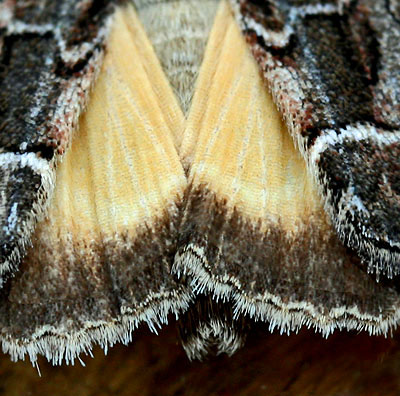
Detail of the hind wings

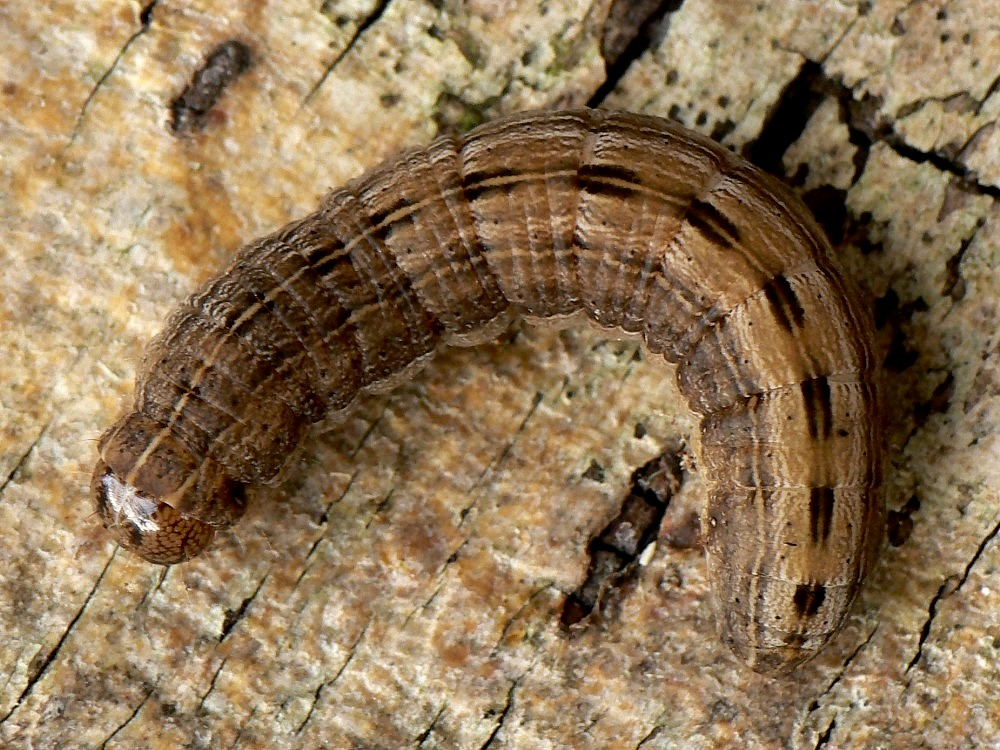
Larva
