= Dysauxes parvigutta =

Scientific classification
- Domain: Eukaryota
- Kingdom: Animalia
- Phylum: Arthropoda
- Class: Insecta
- Order: Lepidoptera
- Superfamily: Noctuoidea
- Family: Erebidae
- Subfamily: Arctiinae
- Genus: Dysauxes
- Species: D. parvigutta

Binomial name
- Dysauxes parvigutta (Christoph, 1889)

Synonyms
- Naclia punctata var. parvigutta Christoph, 1889

Species of moth

Dysauxes parvigutta is a moth of the family Erebidae. It was described by Hugo Theodor Christoph in 1889. It is found in Iran.

== Subspecies ==
- Dysauxes parvigutta parvigutta
- Dysauxes parvigutta guttulifera Ignatyev & Zolotuhin, 2006 (northern Iran)
