= Dysauxes kaschmiriensis =

Scientific classification
- Domain: Eukaryota
- Kingdom: Animalia
- Phylum: Arthropoda
- Class: Insecta
- Order: Lepidoptera
- Superfamily: Noctuoidea
- Family: Erebidae
- Subfamily: Arctiinae
- Genus: Dysauxes
- Species: D. kaschmiriensis

Binomial name
- Dysauxes kaschmiriensis Rothschild, 1910

Synonyms
- Dysauxes punctata kaschmiriensis Rothschild, 1910; Dysauxes afghanica Daniel, 1965; Dysauxes kaschmirensis silvatica Ebert, 1969

Species of moth

Dysauxes kaschmiriensis is a moth of the family Erebidae. It was described by Rothschild in 1910. It is found in Kashmir, Pakistan and India.

== Subspecies ==
- Dysauxes kaschmiriensis kaschmiriensis (Kashmir)
- Dysauxes kaschmiriensis karapaki Ignatyev & Zolotuhin, 2006 (Pakistan)
- Dysauxes kaschmiriensis kautti Ignatyev & Zolotuhin, 2006 (India: Himachal Pradesh)
