= 2009 Deutsche Tourenwagen Masters =

Champions
- Drivers' Champion: Timo Scheider
- Teams' Champion: HWA Team II

Seasons
- ← 2008 2010 →

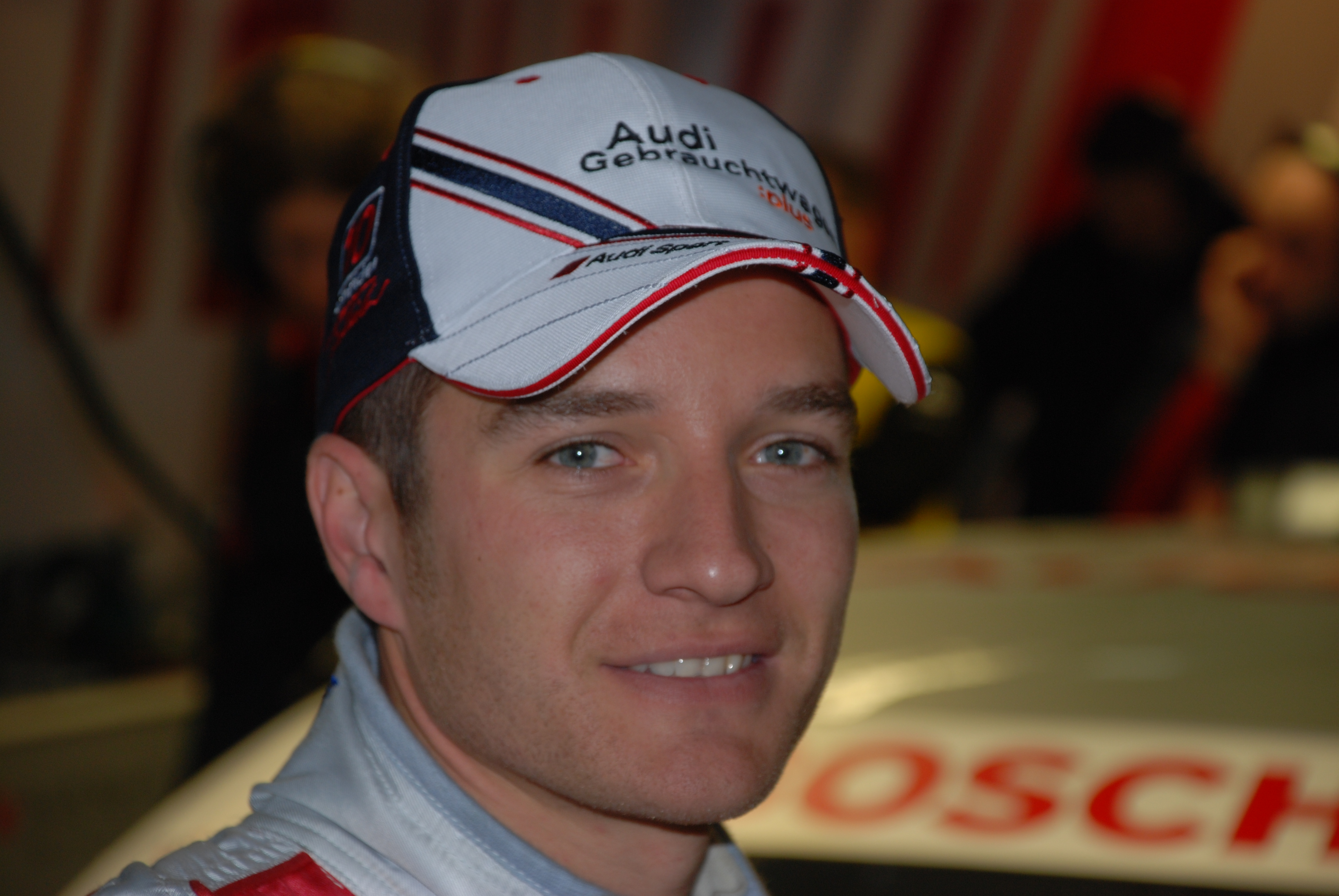
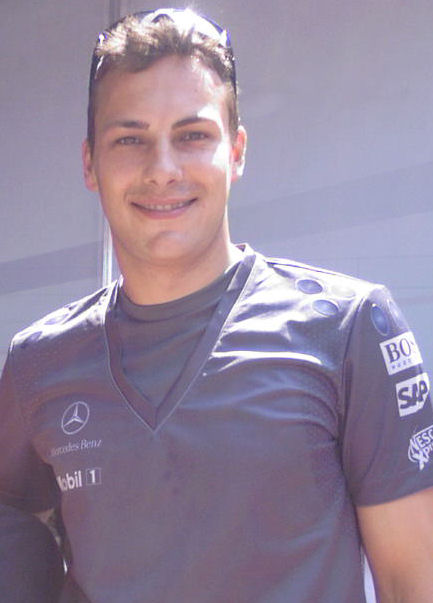
Timo Scheider defended his second Deutsche Tourenwagen Masters Drivers' Championship while Gary Paffett (right) finished second in the championship.

The 2009 Deutsche Tourenwagen Masters was the twenty-third season of premier German touring car championship and also tenth season under the moniker of Deutsche Tourenwagen Masters since the series' resumption in 2000. The series began on 17 May at Hockenheim and finished on 25 October at the same venue.

Timo Scheider successfully defended his championship title, taking his Audi A4 to a five-point series win over Mercedes-Benz driver Gary Paffett.

== Teams and drivers ==
Of the nineteen drivers that competed in the 2008 season, only Bernd Schneider and Christijan Albers did not return. Rookies in 2009 are the Kolles Futurecom trio of Christian Bakkerud, Johannes Seidlitz and Tomáš Kostka. The following manufacturers, teams and drivers competed in the 2009 Deutsche Tourenwagen Masters. All teams competed with tyres supplied by Dunlop.

Manufacturer	Car	Team	No.	Drivers	Rounds
Audi	Audi A4 DTM 2009	Abt Sportsline	1	(Germany) Timo Scheider	All
Audi	Audi A4 DTM 2009	Abt Sportsline	2	(Denmark) Tom Kristensen	All
Audi	Audi A4 DTM 2009	Abt Sportsline	5	(Sweden) Mattias Ekström	All
Audi	Audi A4 DTM 2009	Abt Sportsline	6	(Germany) Martin Tomczyk	All
Audi	Audi A4 DTM 2008	Abt Sportsline	21	(United Kingdom) Katherine Legge	All
Audi	Audi A4 DTM 2008	Team Rosberg	11	(Germany) Mike Rockenfeller	All
Audi	Audi A4 DTM 2008	Team Rosberg	12	(Germany) Markus Winkelhock	All
Audi	Audi A4 DTM 2008	Team Phoenix	14	(France) Alexandre Prémat	All
Audi	Audi A4 DTM 2008	Team Phoenix	15	(United Kingdom) Oliver Jarvis	All
Audi	Audi A4 DTM 2007	Kolles Futurecom	18	(Denmark) Christian Bakkerud	1–4, 6–10
Audi	Audi A4 DTM 2007	Kolles Futurecom	19	(Germany) Johannes Seidlitz	1–2, 5–10
Audi	Audi A4 DTM 2007	Kolles Futurecom	20	(Czech Republic) Tomáš Kostka	All
Mercedes-Benz	AMG-Mercedes C-Klasse 2009	HWA Team	3	(United Kingdom) Paul di Resta	All
Mercedes-Benz	AMG-Mercedes C-Klasse 2009	HWA Team	4	(Germany) Ralf Schumacher	All
Mercedes-Benz	AMG-Mercedes C-Klasse 2009	HWA Team	9	(Canada) Bruno Spengler	All
Mercedes-Benz	AMG-Mercedes C-Klasse 2009	HWA Team	10	(United Kingdom) Gary Paffett	All
Mercedes-Benz	AMG-Mercedes C-Klasse 2008	Persson Motorsport	7	(United Kingdom) Jamie Green	All
Mercedes-Benz	AMG-Mercedes C-Klasse 2008	Persson Motorsport	8	(United Kingdom) Susie Stoddart	All
Mercedes-Benz	AMG-Mercedes C-Klasse 2008	Mücke Motorsport	16	(Germany) Maro Engel	All
Mercedes-Benz	AMG-Mercedes C-Klasse 2008	Mücke Motorsport	17	(Austria) Mathias Lauda	All

== Driver changes ==
Katherine Legge moved from the Futurecom-TME team to a team created for her at Audi Sport Team Abt Lady Power, gaining a later model Audi with the change.

Christian Bakkerud joined the series coming from GP2 Series along with Formula Renault BARC driver Johannes Seidlitz both joining the Colin Kolles owned Futurecom-TME team with Czech Touring Car Championship racer Tomáš Kostka joining sister-team Futurecom-BRT.

Christijan Albers left DTM to pursue sports car racing with Kolles' Le Mans Series team and the most successful driver in the history of DTM, four-time champion Bernd Schneider retired from the sport.

== Technical changes ==
The series adopted new rule changes, as announced on 21 April 2009. Qualifying consisted of four sessions, rather than two in 2008. The minimum weights of the cars were also altered, with 2009 cars topping the scales at 1050 kg, 2008 cars at 1030 kg and 2007 machinery at 1010 kg.

== Race calendar and results ==
To avoid a clash of coverage times with the 2009 Bahrain Grand Prix, the season opener traditionally held at Hockenheim took place on 17 May, three weeks later than originally planned. Consequently, the EuroSpeedway round that had been scheduled for this date was moved to 31 May. The Brands Hatch round was also moved back a week due to the 2009 Belgian Grand Prix, from 30 August to 6 September.

French circuit Dijon-Prenois made its maiden appearance on the DTM calendar by replacing the Le Mans Bugatti track and thus holding the penultimate round of the season on 11 October. Italian circuit Mugello was dropped from the calendar.

Round	Circuit	Date	Pole position	Fastest lap	Winning driver	Winning team
1	(Germany) Hockenheimring	17 May	(Sweden) Mattias Ekström	(Sweden) Mattias Ekström	(Denmark) Tom Kristensen	Abt Sportsline
2	(Germany) EuroSpeedway Lausitz	31 May	(Sweden) Mattias Ekström	(United Kingdom) Jamie Green	(United Kingdom) Gary Paffett	HWA Team
3	(Germany) Norisring, Nuremberg	28 June	(Germany) Timo Scheider	(United Kingdom) Katherine Legge	(United Kingdom) Jamie Green	Persson Motorsport
4	(Netherlands) Circuit Park Zandvoort	19 July	(United Kingdom) Oliver Jarvis	(Sweden) Mattias Ekström	(United Kingdom) Gary Paffett	HWA Team
5	(Germany) Motorsport Arena Oschersleben	2 August	(Denmark) Tom Kristensen	(Germany) Timo Scheider	(Germany) Timo Scheider	Abt Sportsline
6	(Germany) Nürburgring	16 August	(Germany) Martin Tomczyk	(Sweden) Mattias Ekström	(Germany) Martin Tomczyk	Abt Sportsline
7	(United Kingdom) Brands Hatch, Kent	6 September	(United Kingdom) Paul di Resta	(United Kingdom) Paul di Resta	(United Kingdom) Paul di Resta	HWA Team
8	(Spain) Circuit de Catalunya, Barcelona	20 September	(Denmark) Tom Kristensen	(Germany) Timo Scheider	(Germany) Timo Scheider	Abt Sportsline
9	(France) Dijon-Prenois	11 October	(Canada) Bruno Spengler	(United Kingdom) Paul di Resta	(United Kingdom) Gary Paffett	HWA Team
10	(Germany) Hockenheimring	25 October	(Sweden) Mattias Ekström	(United Kingdom) Gary Paffett	(United Kingdom) Gary Paffett	HWA Team

== Season results ==
Timo Scheider won his second DTM series crown for Audi team Abt Sportsline. With season long rival, Mercedes-Benz driver Gary Paffett taking four wins through the season, and with Scheider disqualified from the results at Zandvoort mid-season, left Scheider behind Paffett for much of the season. Schieder finished first or second in all bar one event for the remainder of the season after Zandvoort including victories at Oschersleben and Catalunya in an irresistible charge to the title. By the time Paffett returned to the podium with wins in the last two races of the year Scheider had built a points buffer large enough to secure the title.

Paul di Resta stood on the podium three times in the final four races, including a win at Brands Hatch to emerge from the pack in third place in the series pointscore, four points ahead of Bruno Spengler and Mattias Ekström. Apart from Scheider, Paffett and di Resta, race wins were taken by Tom Kristensen at the Hockenheim season opener, his last ever touring car victory before semi-retirement; Jamie Green at the Norisring street circuit and by Martin Tomczyk at the Nürburgring.

The combined efforts of Paffett and Spengler saw the HWA run Salzgitter / Mercedes-Benz Bank team claim the teams prize at season's end, 100 points to 85 points of the Abt Sportsline team of Scheider and Kristensen.

== Championship standings ==
=== Drivers' championship ===
Pos	Driver	HOC (Germany)	LAU (Germany)	NOR (Germany)	ZAN (Netherlands)	OSC (Germany)	NÜR (Germany)	BRH (United Kingdom)	CAT (Spain)	DIJ (France)	HOC (Germany)	Points
1	(Germany) Timo Scheider	2	5	**4**	DSQ	1	2	2	1	6	2	64
2	(United Kingdom) Gary Paffett	Ret	1	5	1	5	8	4	4	1	1	59
3	(United Kingdom) Paul di Resta	5	4	7	6	4	Ret	**1**	7	2	3	45
4	(Canada) Bruno Spengler	Ret	2	2	5	6	6	6	5	**3**	7	41
5	(Sweden) Mattias Ekström	**7**	**3**	3	3	2	3	5	6	9	**Ret**	41
6	(Germany) Martin Tomczyk	Ret	Ret	11	4	3	**1**	3	3	7	Ret	35
7	(United Kingdom) Jamie Green	8	6	1	9	9	5	12	14	4	5	27
8	(Denmark) Tom Kristensen	1	12	8	8	**8**	Ret	19†	**2**	DSQ	15	21
9	(United Kingdom) Oliver Jarvis	3	Ret	Ret	**2**	15†	Ret	8	9	15	6	18
10	(Germany) Markus Winkelhock	4	Ret	13	DSQ	Ret	4	18†	Ret	10	8	11
11	(Germany) Ralf Schumacher	9	10	6	10	11	7	9	13	5	Ret	9
12	(Germany) Maro Engel	6	8	Ret	7	7	12	10	10	12	10	8
13	(France) Alexandre Prémat	Ret	Ret	Ret	DSQ	16†	Ret	11	8	11	4	6
14	(Germany) Mike Rockenfeller	Ret	7	9	12†	13	10	7	12	13	9	4
15	(Austria) Mathias Lauda	10	9	14	Ret	12	9	20†	11	8	14	1
16	(United Kingdom) Susie Stoddart	Ret	11	10	11	10	11	13	15	14	16†	0
17	(Czech Republic) Tomáš Kostka	11	13	Ret	Ret	14	15	14	16	17	11	0
18	(United Kingdom) Katherine Legge	12	Ret	12	Ret	17†	Ret	15	Ret	16	17†	0
19	(Denmark) Christian Bakkerud	14	14	15	DSQ		13	16	17	Ret	12	0
20	(Germany) Johannes Seidlitz	13	DNS			Ret	14	17	18	Ret	13	0
Pos	Driver	HOC (Germany)	LAU (Germany)	NOR (Germany)	ZAN (Netherlands)	OSC (Germany)	NÜR (Germany)	BRH (United Kingdom)	CAT (Spain)	DIJ (France)	HOC (Germany)	Points

Colour	Result
Gold	Winner
Silver	Second place
Bronze	Third place
Green	Points classification
Blue	Non-points classification
Blue	Non-classified finish (NC)
Purple	Retired, not classified (Ret)
Red	Did not qualify (DNQ)
Red	Did not pre-qualify (DNPQ)
Black	Disqualified (DSQ)
White	Did not start (DNS)
White	Withdrew (WD)
White	Race cancelled (C)
Blank	Did not practice (DNP)
Blank	Did not arrive (DNA)
Blank	Excluded (EX)

**Bold** – Pole
Italics – Fastest Lap

- † — Driver retired, but was classified as they completed 90% of the winner's race distance.

=== Teams' championship ===
Pos.	Team	No.	HOC (Germany)	LAU (Germany)	NOR (Germany)	ZAN (Netherlands)	OSC (Germany)	NÜR (Germany)	BRH (United Kingdom)	CAT (Spain)	DIJ (France)	HOC (Germany)	Points
1	Salzgitter / Mercedes-Benz Bank AMG	9	Ret	2	2	5	6	6	6	5	**3**	7	100
1	Salzgitter / Mercedes-Benz Bank AMG	10	Ret	1	5	1	5	8	4	4	1	1	100
2	Audi Sport Team Abt	1	2	5	**4**	DSQ	1	2	2	1	6	2	85
2	Audi Sport Team Abt	2	1	12	8	8	**8**	Ret	19†	**2**	18†	15	85
3	Audi Sport Team Abt Sportsline	5	**7**	**3**	3	3	2	3	5	6	9	**Ret**	76
3	Audi Sport Team Abt Sportsline	6	Ret	Ret	11	4	3	**1**	3	3	7	Ret	76
4	Trilux AMG Mercedes	3	5	4	7	6	4	Ret	**1**	7	2	3	54
4	Trilux AMG Mercedes	4	9	10	6	10	11	7	9	13	5	Ret	54
5	TV Spielfilm / Junge Sterne AMG Mercedes	7	8	6	1	9	9	5	12	14	4	5	27
5	TV Spielfilm / Junge Sterne AMG Mercedes	8	Ret	11	10	11	10	11	13	15	14	16†	27
6	Audi Sport Team Phoenix	14	Ret	Ret	Ret	DSQ	16†	Ret	11	8	11	4	24
6	Audi Sport Team Phoenix	15	3	Ret	Ret	**2**	15†	Ret	8	9	15	6	24
7	Audi Sport Team Rosberg	11	Ret	7	9	12†	13	10	7	12	13	9	15
7	Audi Sport Team Rosberg	12	4	Ret	13	DSQ	Ret	4	18†	Ret	10	8	15
8	GQ / stern AMG Mercedes	16	6	8	Ret	7	7	12	10	10	12	10	9
8	GQ / stern AMG Mercedes	17	10	9	14	Ret	12	9	20†	11	8	14	9
9	KOLLES Futurecom	18	14	14	15	DSQ		13	16	17	Ret	12	0
9	KOLLES Futurecom	19	13	DNS			Ret	14	17	18	Ret	13	0
9	KOLLES Futurecom	20	11	13	Ret	Ret	14	15	14	16	17	11	0
10	Audi Sport Team Abt Lady Power	21	12	Ret	12	Ret	17†	Ret	15	Ret	16	17†	0
Pos.	Team	No.	HOC (Germany)	LAU (Germany)	NOR (Germany)	ZAN (Netherlands)	OSC (Germany)	NÜR (Germany)	BRH (United Kingdom)	CAT (Spain)	DIJ (France)	HOC (Germany)	Points

== Bibliography ==
- Voigt, Thomas (November 2009). DTM Jahrbuch 2009: Das offizielle Buch der DTM (in German). Königswinter: Heel Verlag. ISBN 978-3-89880-691-6.
- Schröder, Torben (November 2009). Tourenwagen Story 2009 (in German). Saint Vith: Adrenalin Verlag. ISBN 978-3-940672-18-6.
