= Wassertrüdingen =

- Town
- Coat of arms

- Location of Wassertrüdingen within Ansbach district
- Interactive map of Wassertrüdingen
- Location within Germany Location within Bavaria
- Coordinates: 49°2′N 10°36′E
- Country: Germany
- State: Bavaria
- Admin. region: Mittelfranken
- District: Ansbach
- Subdivisions: 6 Ortsteile

Government
  - Mayor (2018–24): Stefan Ultsch (SPD)

Area
  - Total: 53.57 km^{2} (20.68 sq mi)
- Elevation: 423 m (1,388 ft)

Population (2025-12-31)
  - Total: 6,374
  - Density: 119.0/km^{2} (308.2/sq mi)
- Time zone: UTC+01:00 (CET)
  - Summer (DST): UTC+02:00 (CEST)
- Postal codes: 91717
- Dialling codes: 0 98 32
- Vehicle registration: AN
- Website: www.wassertruedingen.de

Wassertrüdingen (German pronunciation: [vasɐˈtʁyːdɪŋən]) is a town in the district of Ansbach, Middle Franconia, Bavaria, Germany. It is between the Hesselberg, the only Franconian mountain with a view on the Alps, the wooded heights of the Oettinger Forest and the foothills of the Hahnenkamm. The Fränkisches Seenland (Franconian Lake District) recreation area is 15 kilometers away. Altentrüdingen, Fürnheim, Geilsheim, Obermögersheim, Reichenbach und Schobdach are part of Wassertrüdingen

First documentary evidence in 836 is as truth muntiga. In 1524 Wassertrüdingen was occupied by peasants during the German Peasants' War. During the Thirty Years' War it was severely damaged and had not fully recovered yet 150 years later. In the last weeks of the Second World War the train station was bombarded.

== People ==
- Christian Friedrich Freyer (1794–1885), German entomologist
- Johannes Seidlitz (born 1990), German racing driver
