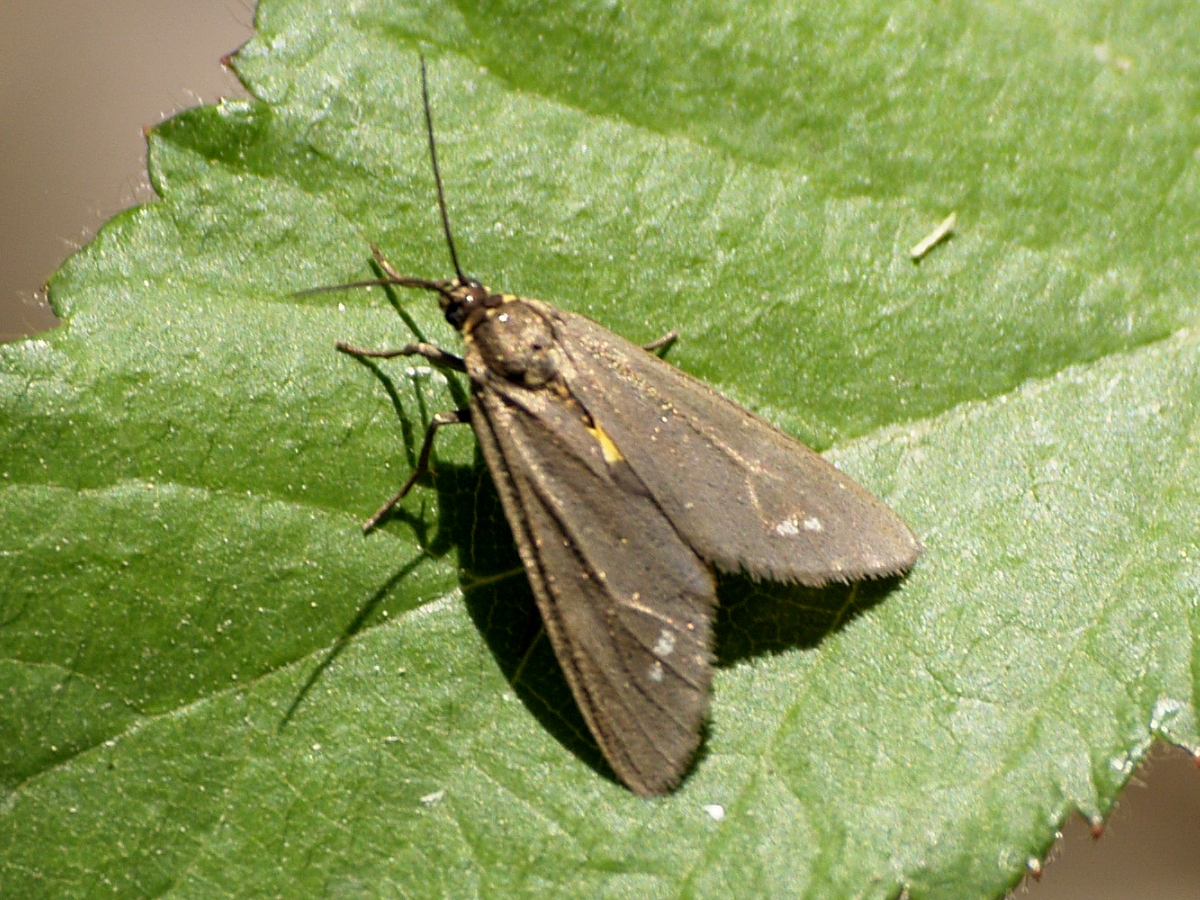

Scientific classification
- Domain: Eukaryota
- Kingdom: Animalia
- Phylum: Arthropoda
- Class: Insecta
- Order: Lepidoptera
- Superfamily: Noctuoidea
- Family: Erebidae
- Subfamily: Arctiinae
- Genus: Dysauxes
- Species: D. punctata

Binomial name
- Dysauxes punctata (Fabricius, 1781)

Synonyms
- Bombyx punctata Fabricius, 1781; Dysauxes punctata Fabricius, 1781; Dysauxes punctata var. sketschana Buresch, 1915; Bombyx serva Hübner, 1802-1808; Bombyx ochrea Millière, 1875; Naclia punctata var. ochrea Millière, 1875

= Dysauxes punctata =

Species of moth

Dysauxes punctata is a moth of the family Erebidae. It was described by Johan Christian Fabricius in 1781. It is found in France, Portugal, Spain, Switzerland, Austria, Italy, Croatia, Bosnia and Herzegovina, North Macedonia, Greece, Turkey, Romania, Ukraine, Russia and North Africa.

The wingspan is 20–22 mm (0.79–0.87 in). Adults are on wing from May to mid-September in two generations per year.

The larvae are polyphagous on low-growing plants, including Taraxacum, Senecio, Plantago and Lactuca species.
