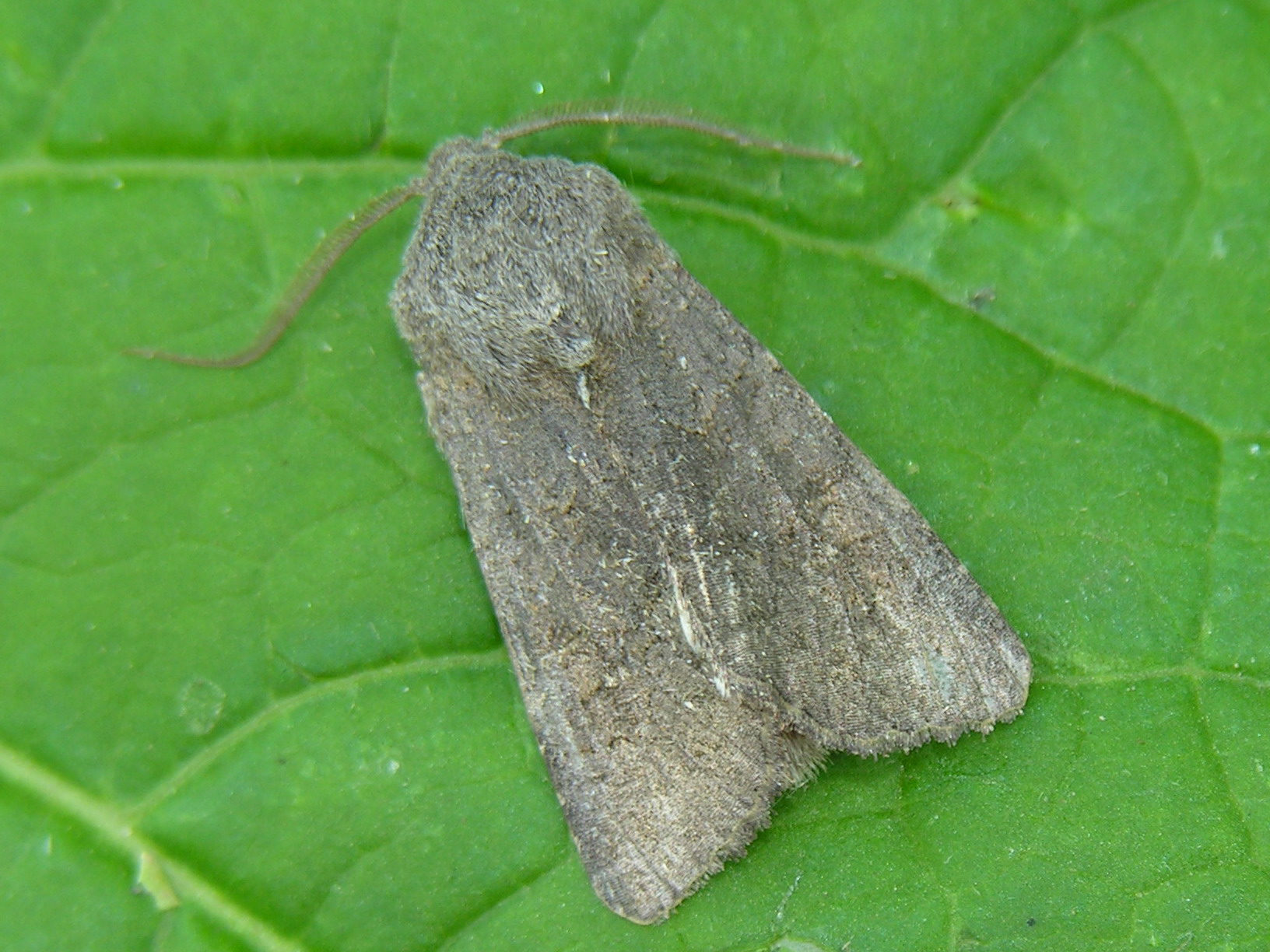

Scientific classification
- Domain: Eukaryota
- Kingdom: Animalia
- Phylum: Arthropoda
- Class: Insecta
- Order: Lepidoptera
- Superfamily: Noctuoidea
- Family: Noctuidae
- Genus: Aporophyla
- Species: A. lutulenta

Binomial name
- Aporophyla lutulenta (Denis & Schiffermüller, 1775)

Synonyms
- Noctua lutulenta Denis & Schiffermüller, 1775

= Aporophyla lutulenta =

Deep brown dart

Species of moth

Aporophyla lutulenta, also known as the deep brown dart, is a moth of the family Noctuoidea. The species was first described by Michael Denis and Ignaz Schiffermüller in 1775. It is found in Europe, primarily in central and southern Europe, near the Black Sea and the Caucasus.

== Technical description and variation ==
Forewing fuscous brown with a purplish grey gloss, which is more pronounced in the females, the males varying from dark to pale rufous brown; lines and markings obscure; median area often darker; hindwing in male white, with the terminal line dark, in female uniform brownish; — ab. tripuncta Frr. (30 b)., is a very distinct dull brown and iron-grey form, with the outer edge of the reniform whitish, slightly smaller than typical. The length of the forewings is 15–18 mm. The caterpillar is green, sometimes tinged with pink on the first three segments. It has three brownish broken lines along the back, and a violet edged white line along the spiracles.

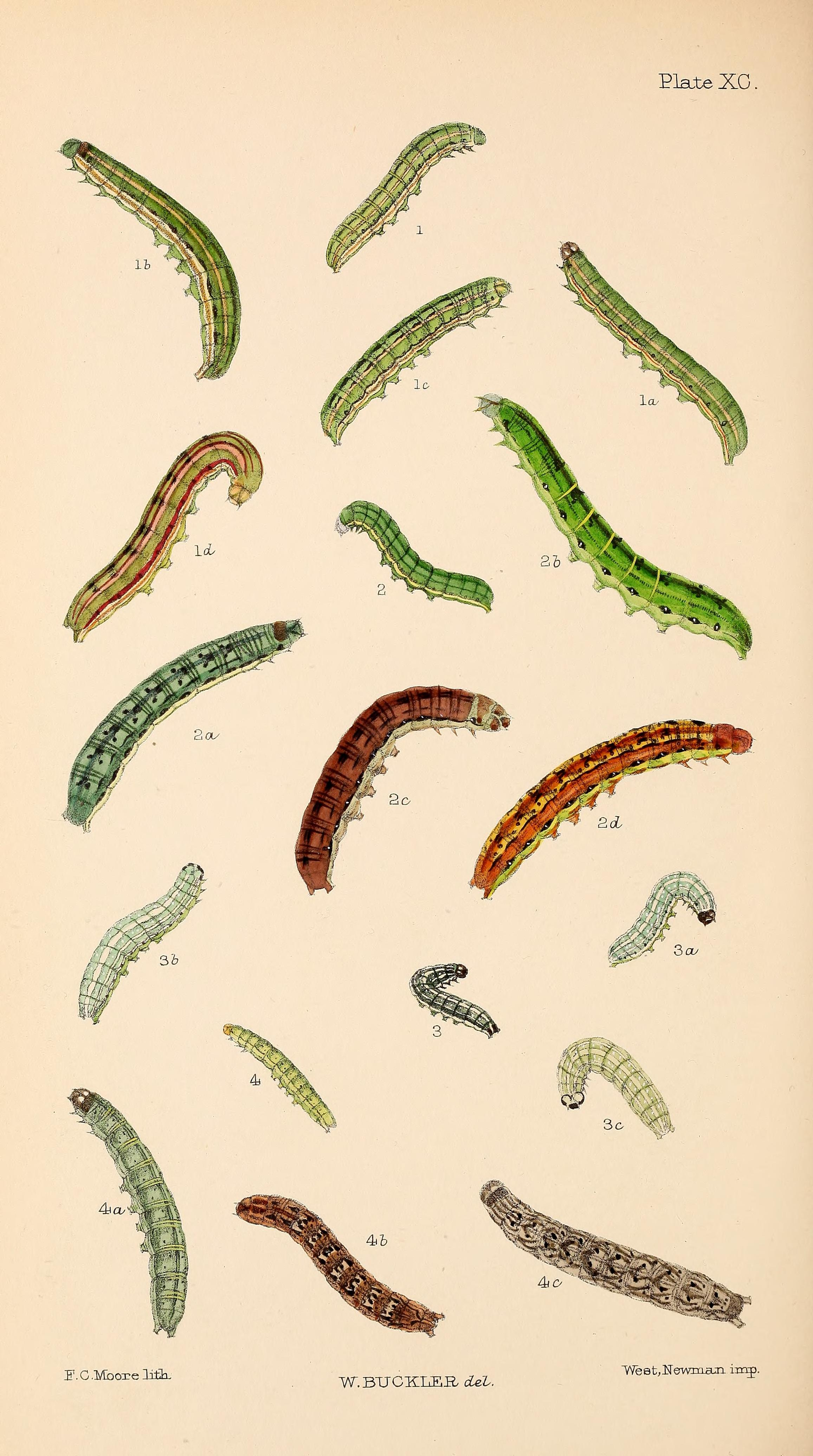
Figs 1, 1a, 1b, 1c, 1d larvae in various stages of growth

== Biology ==
The moth flies in one generation in September.

The larvae feed on various plants including grasses, Ericaceae (Calluna), Rosaceae (Crataegus), Leguminosae (Cytisus).

== Notes ==
1. The flight season refers to Belgium and the Netherlands. This may vary in other parts of the range.
