= Christian Friedrich Freyer =

German entomologist

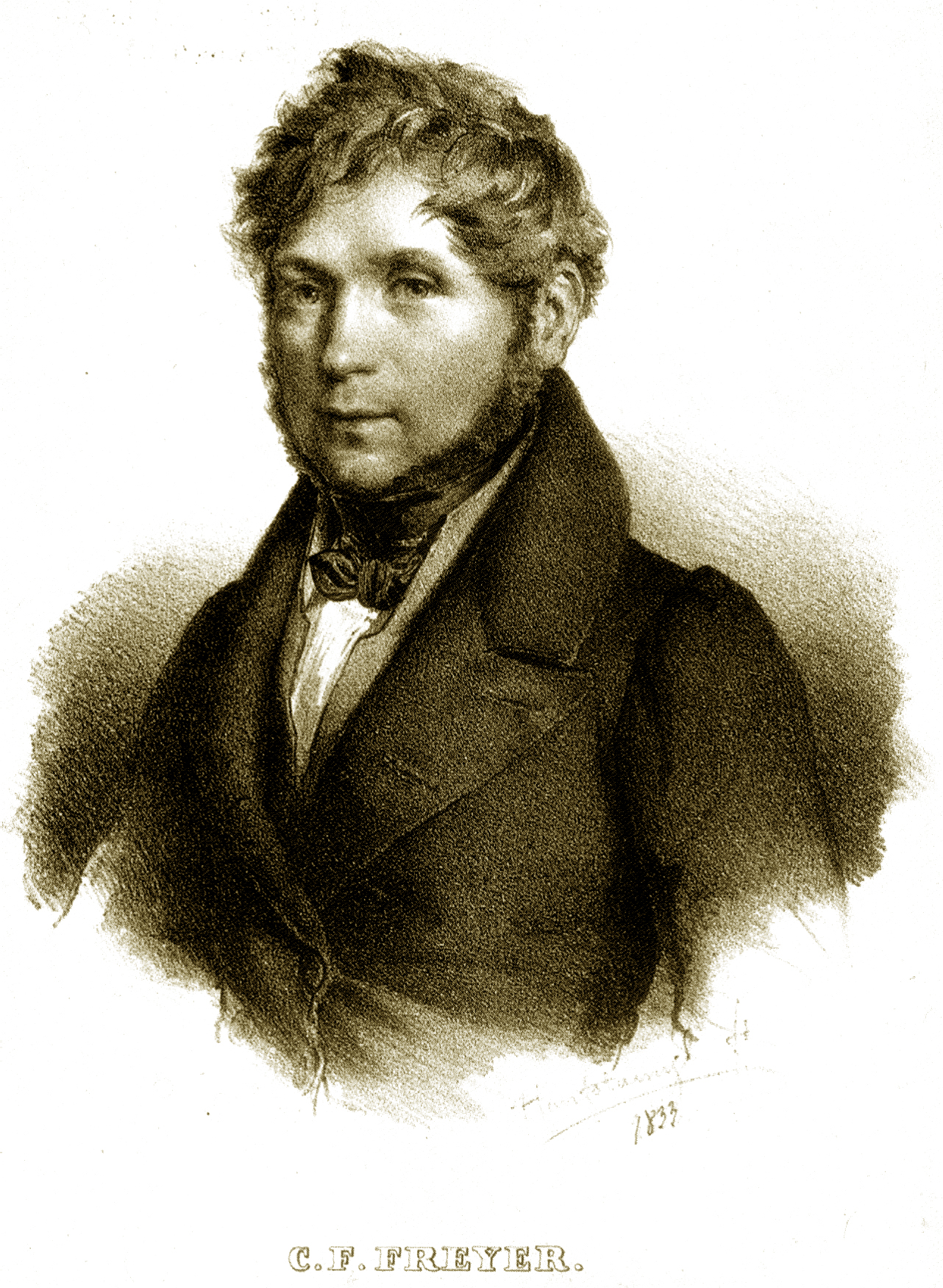
Freyer in 1833

Christian Friedrich Freyer (25 August 1794, in Wassertrüdingen – 11 November 1885, in Augsburg) was a German entomologist mainly interested in Lepidoptera.

Even as a child, Freyer was interested in butterflies. In 1820, he moved from Wassertrüdingen to Augsburg, where he obtained a position as a clerk in the city council. According to contemporaries, in Augsburg, he collected a wide variety of butterfly species with tireless diligence in his spare time. After eight years of living in Augsburg, Freyer began publishing his lepidopterological publications. As curator of the entomology exhibition, Freyer looked after the entomological collection of the Natural Science Association for Schwaben and Neuburg (Naturwissenschaftlicher Verein für Schwaben und Neuburg), founded in 1846 in Augsburg, today the Natural History Association of Swabia.

Freyer was the first to describe 245 species of Lepidoptera, including 193 moths and 52 butterflies. His legacy is preserved in the Senckenberg Museum.
